= 2022 World Rally-Raid Championship =

Rally raid competition

2022 World Rally-Raid Championship
Previous:	2021 (FIA); 2021 (FIM)	Next:	2023

The 2022 World Rally-Raid Championship was the inaugural season of the annual competition for rally raid events sanctioned by both the FIA and FIM.

== Calendar ==
The calendar for the 2022 season originally featured five rally-raid events. Rally Kazakhstan, which was initially planned for 24–30 April, was cancelled due to the Russian invasion of Ukraine. The Andalucía Rally was moved from its original 6–12 June date to October due to a heat wave and wildfire risk in the region, and the Rallye du Maroc was pushed forward by five days to accommodate the change.

Round	Dates	Rally name	Format	Ref.
1	1–14 January	(Saudi Arabia) Dakar Rally	Marathon	
2	5–10 March	(United Arab Emirates) Abu Dhabi Desert Challenge	Rally	
3	1–6 October	(Morocco) Rallye du Maroc	Rally	
4	18–23 October	(Spain) Andalucía Rally	Rally	

== World Championship results ==
Round	Event	Winning FIM rider	Winning FIM manufacturer	Category	Winning time	Winning FIA driver	Winning FIA co-driver	Winning FIA manufacturer	Category	Winning time
1	(Saudi Arabia) Dakar Rally	(United Kingdom) Sam Sunderland	(Austria) Gas Gas Factory Racing	RallyGP	38:47:30	(Qatar) Nasser Al-Attiyah	(France) Mathieu Baumel	(Japan) Toyota Gazoo Racing	T1	38:33:03
2	(United Arab Emirates) Abu Dhabi Desert Challenge	(United Kingdom) Sam Sunderland	(Austria) Gas Gas Factory Racing	RallyGP	16:54:24	(Chile) Francisco López	(Italy) Paulo Ceci	(Germany) South Racing Can-Am	T3	18:53:46
3	(Morocco) Rallye du Maroc	(United States) Skyler Howes	(Austria) Husqvarna Factory Racing	RallyGP	16:30:29	(France) Guerlain Chicherit	(France) Alex Winocq	(France) GCK Motorsport	T1	14:47:29
4	(Spain) Andalucía Rally	(France) Adrien Van Beveren	(Japan) Monster Energy Honda	RallyGP	09:58:48	(France) Sébastien Loeb	(Belgium) Fabian Lurquin	(United Kingdom) Bahrain Raid Extreme	T1	08:40:35

== T1 ==
=== Entry list ===
T1 Teams & Drivers
Constructor	Vehicle	Team	Driver	Co-driver	Rounds
BMW	BMW X5	VRT Team	Vladimir Vasilyev	(Latvia) Oleg Uperenko	1
Buggy	Buggy GCK Thunder	(France) GCK Motorsport	(France) Guerlain Chicherit	(France) Alex Winocq	1
Century	Century CR6	(France) SRT Racing	(France) Mathieu Serradori	(France) Loic Minaudier	1–2
Century	Century CR6	(France) SRT Racing	(Belgium) Alexandre Leroy	(France) Nicolas Delangue	1
Jeep	Jeep Tanker	(Spain) Krestex Team	(Spain) Jordi Queralto	(Czech Republic) Petra Zemankova	1
Mini	Mini John Cooper Works Buggy	(Germany) X-Raid Mini JCW Team	(Poland) Jakub Przygoński	(Germany) Timo Gottschalk	1–2
Mini	Mini John Cooper Works Buggy	(Germany) X-Raid Mini JCW Team	(Argentina) Sebastian Halpern	(Argentina) Bernardo Graue	1
Mini	Mini John Cooper Works Buggy	(Germany) X-Raid Mini JCW Team	Denis Krotov	Konstantin Zhiltsov	1
Optimus MD	Optimus MD Rallye	(France) MD Rallye Sport	(France) Pierre Lachaume	(France) Stephane Duple	1
Optimus MD	Optimus MD Rallye	(France) MD Rallye Sport	(France) Jean Remy Bergounhe	(France) Gérard Dubuy	1
Peugeot	Peugeot 3008 DKR	(France) PH-Sport	(France) Lionel Baud	(France) Jean-Pierre Garcin	1
Prodrive	Prodrive Hunter	Bahrain Raid Xtreme	(France) Sébastien Loeb	(Belgium) Fabian Lurquin	1–2
Prodrive	Prodrive Hunter	Bahrain Raid Xtreme	(Spain) Nani Roma	(Spain) Alex Haro Bravo	1
Toyota	Toyota GR DKR Hilux	(Japan) Toyota Gazoo Racing	(Qatar) Nasser Al-Attiyah	(France) Mathieu Baumel	1–2
Toyota	Toyota Hilux Overdrive	(Japan) Overdrive Toyota	(Saudi Arabia) Yazeed Al-Rajhi	(United Kingdom) Michael Orr	1
Toyota	Toyota Hilux Overdrive	(Japan) Overdrive Toyota	(Saudi Arabia) Yazeed Al-Rajhi	(Germany) Dirk von Zitzewitz	2
Toyota	Toyota Hilux Overdrive	(Japan) Overdrive Toyota	(Argentina) Lucio Álvarez	(Spain) Armand Monleon	1
Toyota	Toyota Hilux Overdrive	(Japan) Overdrive Toyota	(Netherlands) Bernhard Ten Brinke	(France) Sébastien Delaunay	1
Toyota	Toyota Hilux Overdrive	(Japan) Overdrive Toyota	(Argentina) Sebastian Halpern	(Argentina) Bernardo Graue	2
Toyota	Toyota Hilux 2016 IRS	(Saudi Arabia) TGR Kreda	(Lithuania) Antanas Juknevičius	(Latvia) Didzis Zariņš	1

=== Results ===
Round	Rally name	FIA World Rally-Raid Championship Podium finishers			
Round	Rally name	Rank	Driver/Co-Driver	Car	Time
1	(Saudi Arabia) Dakar Rally	1	(Qatar) Nasser Al-Attiyah (France) Mathieu Baumel	Toyota GR DKR Hilux	38:33:03
1	(Saudi Arabia) Dakar Rally	2	(France) Sébastien Loeb (Belgium) Fabian Lurquin	BRX Hunter T1+	39:00:49
1	(Saudi Arabia) Dakar Rally	3	(Saudi Arabia) Yazeed Al-Rajhi (United Kingdom) Michael Orr	Toyota Hilux Overdrive	39:34:16
2	(United Arab Emirates) Abu Dhabi Desert Challenge	1	(Chile) Francisco López (Italy) Paolo Ceci	Can-Am XRS	18:53:46
2	(United Arab Emirates) Abu Dhabi Desert Challenge	2	(Spain) Cristina Gutiérrez (France) François Cazalet	OT3 - 01	19:02:04
2	(United Arab Emirates) Abu Dhabi Desert Challenge	3	(Poland) Jakub Przygoński (Germany) Timo Gottschalk	Mini John Cooper Works Buggy	19:12:00
3	(Morocco) Rallye du Maroc	1	(France) Guerlain Chicherit (France) Alex Winocq	BRX Hunter T1+	14:47:29
3	(Morocco) Rallye du Maroc	2	(Argentina) Orlando Terranova (Spain) Alex Haro Bravo	BRX Hunter T1+	14:58:24
3	(Morocco) Rallye du Maroc	3	(Qatar) Nasser Al-Attiyah (France) Mathieu Baumel	Toyota GR DKR Hilux	15:16:53
4	(Spain) Andalucía Rally	1	(France) Sébastien Loeb (Belgium) Fabian Lurquin	BRX Hunter T1+	08:40:35
4	(Spain) Andalucía Rally	2	(Qatar) Nasser Al-Attiyah (France) Mathieu Baumel	Toyota GR DKR Hilux	08:40:41
4	(Spain) Andalucía Rally	3	(Saudi Arabia) Yazeed Al-Rajhi (United Kingdom) Michael Orr	Toyota Hilux Overdrive	08:50:01

=== FIA Rally-Raid World Championship for Drivers, Co-Drivers, and Manufacturers ===
Points system

Competitors have to be registered to score points.

- Points for final positions in rally events are awarded as per the following table:

Position	1st	2nd	3rd	4th	5th	6th	7th	8th	9th	10th	11th	12th	13th	14th	15th
Overall points	30	25	20	17	15	13	10	9	8	7	6	5	4	3	2
Leg Points	5	4	3	2	1	0									

- Points for final positions in marathon events are awarded as per the following table:

Position	1st	2nd	3rd	4th	5th	6th	7th	8th	9th	10th	11th	12th	13th	14th	15th
Overall points	50	40	30	25	20	15	10	9	8	7	6	5	4	3	2
Leg Points	5	4	3	2	1	0									

==== Drivers' & Co-Drivers' championships ====
Pos	Driver	DAK (Saudi Arabia)	ABU (United Arab Emirates)	MOR (Morocco)	AND (Spain)	Points
1	(Qatar) Nasser Al-Attiyah	1^{85}	11^{26}	3^{33}	2^{25}	169
2	(France) Sébastien Loeb	2^{84}	6^{28}	22^{10}	1^{25}	149
3	(Saudi Arabia) Yazeed Al-Rajhi	3^{51}	12^{20}	6^{29}	3^{21}	121
4	(Poland) Jakub Przygoński	6^{36}	3^{22}	5^{19}		77
5	(Chile) Francisco López	5^{5}	1^{35}	7^{10}	6^{7}	57
6	(France) Guerlain Chicherit	Ret		1^{30}		48
7	(France) Matthieu Serradori	5^{33}	13^{6}		8^{5}	44
8	(Spain) Cristina Gutiérrez		2^{26}	8^{9}	11^{3}	28
9	(Argentina) Orlando Terranova			2^{35}		35
10	(United States) Seth Quintero		7^{14}	6^{13}	5^{8}	35
11	(Lithuania) Rokas Baciuška	15^{2}	5^{16}	9^{8}	9^{4}	30
12	(Argentina) Sebastian Halpern	6^{19}	15^{6}	24^{1}		26
13	(Argentina) Lucio Alvarez	9^{25}				25
14	(Netherlands) Bernhard Ten Brinke	8^{21}				21
15	(Poland) Marek Goczał		4^{19}			19
16	(Spain) Nani Roma	36^{18}				18
17	(Belgium) Guillaume De Mevius			12^{5}	4^{10}	15
18	Vladimir Vasilyev	7^{14}				14
19	(Spain) Pau Navarro			10^{7}	7^{5}	12
20	(Germany) Annett Fischer		8^{9}		13^{2}	11
21	(France) Jean-Luc Pisson		10^{7}	14^{3}		10
22	(Netherlands) Erik Van Loon			25^{6}	15^{4}	10
23	(United Kingdom) Thomas Bell		9^{8}			8
24	(United States) Austin Jones	14^{3}	14^{3}		14^{2}	8
25	(France) Pierre Lachaume	10^{7}				7
26	(United States) Mitch Guthrie			11^{6}		6
27	(France) Jean Remy Bergounhe	11^{6}				6
28	(France) Baud Lionel	10^{5}				5
29	Denis Krotov	13^{4}				4
30	(Chile) Lucas Jose Del Rio Alamos			13^{4}		4
31	(Spain) Fernando Alvarez Castellano				12^{3}	4
32	(Spain) Evgeny Kireev			15^{2}		2
33	(Belgium) Alexandre Leroy	29^{1}				1
Pos	Driver	DAK (Saudi Arabia)	ABU (United Arab Emirates)	MOR (Morocco)	AND (Spain)	Points

Pos	Driver	DAK (Saudi Arabia)	ABU (United Arab Emirates)	MOR (Morocco)	AND (Spain)	Points
1	(France) Mathieu Baumel	1^{85}	11^{26}	3^{33}	2^{25}	169
2	(Belgium) Fabian Lurquin	2^{84}	6^{28}	22^{10}	1^{25}	149
3	(Germany) Dirk von Zitzewitz		12^{20}	4^{29}	3^{21}	70
4	(Germany) Timo Gottschalk	4^{36}	3^{22}			58
5	(Spain) Alex Haro Bravo	34^{18}		2^{35}		53
6	(United Kingdom) Michael Orr	3^{51}				51
7	(France) Alex Winocq	Ret		1^{30}		48
8	(France) Loic Minaudier	5^{33}	13^{6}		8^{5}	44
9	(Spain) Armand Monleon	9^{25}		5^{19}		44
10	(France) François Cazalet		2^{26}	12^{5}	4^{10}	41
11	(Italy) Paolo Ceci		1^{35}			35
12	(Spain) Oriol Mena	15^{2}	5^{16}	7^{10}	6^{7}	35
13	(Germany) Dennis Zenz		7^{14}	6^{13}	5^{8}	35
14	(France) Sébastien Delaunay	8^{21}		25^{6}	15^{4}	31
15	(Argentina) Bernardo Graue	6^{19}	15^{6}	24^{1}		26
16	(Poland) Lukasz Laskawiec		4^{19}			19
17	(Latvia) Oleg Uperenko	7^{14}				14
18	(France) Michael Metge			10^{7}	7^{5}	12
19	(Spain) Pablo Moreno Huete			8^{9}	11^{3}	12
20	(Spain) Oriol Vidal Montijano			9^{8}	9^{4}	12
21	(Argentina) Bruno Jacomy		9^{8}	13^{4}		12
22	(Sweden) Annie Seel		8^{9}		13^{2}	11
23	(Brazil) Gustavo Gugelmin	14^{3}	14^{3}		14^{2}	8
24	(France) Laurent Lichtleuchter		10^{7}			7
25	(France) Stephane Duple	10^{7}				7
26	(France) Gérard Dubuy	11^{6}				6
27	(Norway) Ola Floene			11^{6}		6
28	(France) Remi Boulanger				10^{5}	5
29	(Chile) Juan Pablo Latrach	12^{5}				5
30	Konstantin Zhiltsov	13^{4}				4
31	(France) Xavier Panseri				12^{3}	3
32	(France) Cedric Duple			14^{3}		3
33	(Italy) Jacopo Cerulli			15^{2}		2
25	(France) Nicolas Delangue	28^{1}				1
Pos	Driver	DAK (Saudi Arabia)	ABU (United Arab Emirates)	MOR (Morocco)	AND (Spain)	Points

==== Manufacturer's championship ====
Points system

A registered manufacturer is allowed to enter a maximum of three crews in each event. Only the top two from each manufacturer will count towards their score. Points are awarded on the same scales as set out for drivers/co-drivers.

Pos	Manufacturer	DAK (Saudi Arabia)	ABU (United Arab Emirates)	MOR (Morocco)	AND (Spain)	Points
1	Toyota Gazoo Racing	80	23	37	23	163
2	Bahrain Raid Xtreme	45	20	55	15	135
3	OT3 by Overdrive	16	47	23	16	102
4	X-Raid Mini JCW Team	45	25	22		92
5	PH-Sport	14	15	17	7	53
6	MD Rallye Sport Optimus	25	-25			0
Pos	Manufacturer	DAK (Saudi Arabia)	ABU (United Arab Emirates)	MOR (Morocco)	AND (Spain)	Points

== T3 ==
=== Entry list ===
FIA Rally-Raid Championship T3 Teams & Drivers
Constructor	Vehicle	Team	Driver	Co-driver	Rounds
Can-Am	Can-Am XRS	EKS - South Racing	(Chile) Francisco López	(Chile) Juan Pablo Latrach	1
Can-Am	Can-Am T3RR	Pinch Racing	(France) Philippe Pinchedez	(France) Thomas Gaidella	1
Can-Am	Can-Am Maverick X3	South Racing Can-Am	(Spain) Fernando Álvarez	(France) Xavier Panseri	1
Can-Am	Can-Am Maverick X3	South Racing Can-Am	(Chile) Francisco López	(Italy) Paolo Ceci	2
Can-Am	Can-Am Maverick X3	South Racing Middle East	(United Kingdom) Thomas Bell	(Argentina) Bruno Jacomy	1–2
Can-Am	Can-Am Maverick X3	South Racing Middle East	(Saudi Arabia) Dania Akeel	(Uruguay) Sergio Lafuente	1
Can-Am	Can-Am Maverick X3	South Racing Middle East	(Saudi Arabia) Mashael AlObaidan	(Italy) Jacopo Cerutti	1
Can-Am	Can-Am Maverick X3		(Germany) Annett Fischer	(Sweden) Annie Seel	2
Can-Am	Can-Am Maverick X3	FN Speed Team	(Spain) Santiago Navarro	(Spain) Marc Solà	1
Can-Am	Can-Am Maverick X3	FN Speed Team	(Spain) Jordi Segura	(Spain) Pedro Lopez Chaves	1
Can-Am	Can-Am Maverick X3	FN Speed Team	(Spain) Merce Marti	(Andorra) Margot Llobera	1
Can-Am	Can-Am X3	FN Speed Team	(Ecuador) Sebastian Guayasamin	(Argentina) Ricardo Adrian Torlaschi	1
Can-Am	Can-Am X3 T3 Pro	Buggyra ZM Racing	(Saudi Arabia) Saleh Alsaif	(Spain) Oriol Vidal	1
OT3	OT3 - 01	Red Bull Off-Road Team USA	(Spain) Cristina Gutiérrez	(France) François Cazalet	1–2
OT3	OT3 - 04	Red Bull Off-Road Team USA	(Belgium) Guillaume De Mévius	(Belgium) Tom Colsoul	1–2
OT3	OT3 - 02	Red Bull Off-Road Junior Team USA	(United States) Seth Quintero	(Germany) Dennis Zenz	1–2
OT3	OT3 - 03	Red Bull Off-Road Junior Team USA	(Norway) Andreas Mikkelsen	(Norway) Ola Fløene	1
OT3	OT3 - 03	Red Bull Off-Road Junior Team USA	(United States) Mitch Guthrie	(Norway) Ola Fløene	2
PH-Sport	PH-Sport Zephyr	PH-Sport Dans Les Pas de Léa	(France) Lionel Costes	(France) Christophe Tressens	1
PH-Sport	PH-Sport Zephyr	JLT Racing	(France) Jean-Luc Pisson	(France) Jean Brucy	1
PH-Sport	PH-Sport Zephyr	JLT Racing	(France) Jean-Luc Pisson	(France) Laurent Lichtleuchter	2
PH-Sport	PH-Sport Zephyr	PH-Sport	(Italy) Marco Carrara	(Italy) Enrico Gaspari	1
Yamaha	Yamaha YXZ1000R	Yamaha powered by X-Raid Team	(Italy) Camelia Liparoti	(Spain) Xavier Blanco	1
Yamaha	Yamaha YXZ1000R	Yamaha powered by X-Raid Team	(Germany) Annett Fischer	(Sweden) Annie Seel	1
Yamaha	Yamaha YXZ1000R SS	Yamaha powered by X-Raid Team	(Qatar) Ahmed Alkuwari Fahad	(Qatar) Nasser Alkuwari	1

=== Results ===
Round	Rally name	Podium finishers			
Round	Rally name	Rank	Driver/Co-Driver	Car	Time
1	(Saudi Arabia) Dakar Rally	1	(Chile) Francisco Lopez Contardo (Chile) Juan Pablo Latrach Vinagre	Can-Am XRS	45:50:51
1	(Saudi Arabia) Dakar Rally	2	(Spain) Cristina Gutiérrez (France) François Cazalet	OT3 - 01	50:25:34
1	(Saudi Arabia) Dakar Rally	3	(Spain) Santiago Navarro (Spain) Marc Solà	Can-Am Maverick X3	51:02:26
2	(United Arab Emirates) Abu Dhabi Desert Challenge	1	(Chile) Francisco Lopez Contardo (Italy) Paolo Ceci	Can-Am XRS	18:53:46
2	(United Arab Emirates) Abu Dhabi Desert Challenge	2	(Spain) Cristina Gutiérrez (France) François Cazalet	OT3 - 01	19:02:04
2	(United Arab Emirates) Abu Dhabi Desert Challenge	3	(United States) Seth Quintero (Germany) Dennis Zenz	OT3 - 02	20:16:06
3	(Morocco) Rallye du Maroc	1	(United States) Seth Quintero (Germany) Dennis Zenz	OT3 - 02	16:44:38
3	(Morocco) Rallye du Maroc	2	(Chile) Francisco Lopez Contardo (Spain) Pablo Moreno Huete	Can-Am XRS	16:54:35
3	(Morocco) Rallye du Maroc	3	(Spain) Cristina Gutiérrez (Spain) Oriol Mena	OT3 - 01	16:56:03
4	(Spain) Andalucía Rally	1	(Belgium) Guillamue De Mevius (France) François Cazalet	OT3 - 02	09:07:42
4	(Spain) Andalucía Rally	2	(United States) Seth Quintero (Germany) Dennis Zenz	OT3 - 02	9:15:45
4	(Spain) Andalucía Rally	2	(Chile) Francisco Lopez Contardo (Spain) Oriol Mena	Can-Am XRS	09:29:45

=== FIA Rally-Raid Championship for T3 Drivers and Co-Drivers ===
Points system

Competitors have to be registered to score points.

- Points for final positions in rally events are awarded as per the following table:

Position	1st	2nd	3rd	4th	5th	6th	7th	8th	9th	10th	11th	12th	13th	14th	15th
Overall points	30	25	20	17	15	13	10	9	8	7	6	5	4	3	2
Leg Points	5	4	3	2	1	0									

- Points for final positions in marathon events are awarded as per the following table:

Position	1st	2nd	3rd	4th	5th	6th	7th	8th	9th	10th	11th	12th	13th	14th	15th
Overall points	50	40	30	25	20	15	10	9	8	7	6	5	4	3	2
Leg Points	5	4	3	2	1	0									

==== Drivers' & Co-Drivers' championships ====
Pos	Driver	DAK (Saudi Arabia)	ABU (United Arab Emirates)	MOR (Morocco)	AND (Spain)	Points
1	(Chile) Francisco López	1^{90}	1^{51}	2^{41}	3^{17}	199
2	(United States) Seth Quintero	9^{63}	3^{34}	1^{47}	2^{15}	169
3	(Spain) Cristina Gutiérrez	2^{72}	2^{44}	3^{38}	4^{13}	167
4	(Belgium) Guillaume De Mévius	Ret	Ret	5^{29}	1^{30}	59
5	(United Kingdom) Thomas Bell	5^{25}	5^{22}			47
6	(Germany) Annett Fischer	8^{9}	4^{24}	10^{7}	6^{5}	45
7	(Spain) Santiago Navarro	3^{38}				38
8	(France) Jean-Luc Pisson	12^{7}	6^{15}	6^{15}		36
9	(Italy) Camelia Liparoti	4^{25}				25
10	(United States) Mitch Guthrie		Ret	4^{24}		24
11	(Ecuador) Sebastian Guayasamin	14^{10}		7^{12}		22
12	(Spain) Fernando Álvarez	13^{12}			5^{9}	21
13	(Saudi Arabia) Dania Akeel	6^{16}				16
14	(France) Lionel Costes	7^{15}				15
15	(France) Mathieu Serradori				-1^{13}	13
16	(Spain) Merce Marti			8^{9}		9
17	(Spain) Glenn Brinkman			9^{8}		8
18	(Saudi Arabia) Mashael AlObaidan	10^{7}				7
19	(Spain) Jordi Segura	11^{6}				6
20	(Qatar) Ahmed Alkuwari Fahad	15^{2}				2
	(Italy) Marco Carrara	Ret				0
Pos	Driver	DAK (Saudi Arabia)	ABU (United Arab Emirates)	MOR (Morocco)	AND (Spain)	Points

Pos	Driver	DAK (Saudi Arabia)	ABU (United Arab Emirates)	MOR (Morocco)	AND (Spain)	Points
1	(France) François Cazalet	2^{72}	2^{44}	5^{29}	1^{30}	175
2	(Germany) Dennis Zenz	9^{63}	3^{34}	1^{47}	2^{25}	169
3	(Chile) Juan Pablo Latrach	1^{90}				90
4	(Spain) Oriol Mena			2^{41}	3^{17}	58
5	(Italy) Paolo Ceci		1^{51}			51
6	(Spain) Pablo Moreno Huete			3^{38}	4^{13}	51
7	(Argentina) Bruno Jacomy	5^{25}	5^{22}			47
8	(Sweden) Annie Seel	8^{9}	4^{24}	10^{7}	6^{5}	45
9	(Spain) Marc Solà	3^{38}				38
10	(Spain) Xavier Blanco	4^{25}				25
11	(Norway) Ola Fløene	Ret	Ret	4^{24}		24
12	(Argentina) Ricardo Torlaschi	14^{10}		7^{12}		22
13	(France) Xavier Panseri	13^{12}			5^{9}	21
14	(Uruguay) Sergio Lafuente	6^{16}				16
15	(France) Laurent Lichtleuchter		6^{15}			15
16	(France) Christophe Tressens	7^{15}				15
17	(France) Cedric Duple			6^{13}		13
18	(France) Loic Minaudier				-1^{13}	13
19	(Spain) Rosa Romero Font			8^{9}		9
20	(Spain) Rosa Romero Font			8^{9}		9
20	(Australia) Dale Moscatt			9^{8}		8
21	(Italy) Jacopo Cerutti	10^{7}				7
22	(France) Jean Brucy	12^{7}				7
23	(Spain) Pedro Lopez	11^{6}				6
17	(Qatar) Nasser Alkuwari	15^{2}				2
Pos	Driver	DAK (Saudi Arabia)	ABU (United Arab Emirates)	MOR (Morocco)	AND (Spain)	Points

== T4 ==
=== Entry list ===
FIA Rally-Raid Championship T4 Teams & Drivers
Constructor	Vehicle	Team	Driver	Co-driver	Rounds
Can-Am	BRP Can-Am Maverick XRS	Can-Am Factory South Racing	(United States) Austin Jones	(Brazil) Gustavo Gugelmin	1
Can-Am	BRP Can-Am Maverick XRS	Can-Am Factory South Racing	(Poland) Aron Domżała	(Poland) Maciej Marton	1
Can-Am	BRP Can-Am Maverick XRS	Cobant-Energylandia Rally Team	(Poland) Michał Goczał	(Poland) Szymon Gospodarczyk	1
Can-Am	BRP Can-Am Maverick XRS	Cobant-Energylandia Rally Team	(Poland) Marek Goczał	(Poland) Lukasz Laskawiec	1
Can-Am	BRP Can-Am Maverick XRS	South Racing Can-Am	(Brazil) Rodrigo Luppi De Oliveira	(Brazil) Maykel Justo	1
Can-Am	BRP Can-Am Maverick XRS	South Racing Can-Am	(Lithuania) Rokas Baciuska	(Spain) Oriol Mena	1
Can-Am	BRP Can-Am Maverick XRS	South Racing Can-Am	(Chile) Lucas Del Rio	(Chile) Americo Aliaga	1
Can-Am	BRP Can-Am Maverick XRS	FN Speed Team	(Spain) Gael Queralt	(Spain) Sergi Brugue	1

=== Results ===
Round	Rally name	Podium finishers			
Round	Rally name	Rank	Driver/Co-Driver	Car	Time
1	(Saudi Arabia) Dakar Rally	1	(United States) Austin Jones (Brazil) Gustavo Gugelmin	Can-Am XRS	47:22:50
1	(Saudi Arabia) Dakar Rally	2	(Lithuania) Rokas Baciuška (Spain) Oriol Mena	Can-Am XRS	47:38:08
1	(Saudi Arabia) Dakar Rally	3	(Poland) Marek Goczał (Poland) Lukasz Laskawiec	Can-Am XRS	47:39:11
2	(United Arab Emirates) Abu Dhabi Desert Challenge	1	(Poland) Marek Goczał (Poland) Lukasz Laskawiec	Can-Am XRS	19:12:38
2	(United Arab Emirates) Abu Dhabi Desert Challenge	2	(Lithuania) Rokas Baciuška (Spain) Oriol Mena	Can-Am XRS	19:34:56
2	(United Arab Emirates) Abu Dhabi Desert Challenge	3	(Poland) Michał Goczał (Poland) Szymon Gospodarczyk	Can-Am XRS	37:51:35
3	(Morocco) Rallye du Maroc	1	(Lithuania) Rokas Baciuška (Spain) Oriol Vidal Montijano	Can-Am XRS	17:09:49
3	(Morocco) Rallye du Maroc	2	(Spain) Pau Navarro (France) Michael Metge	Can-Am XRS	17:19:23
3	(Morocco) Rallye du Maroc	3	(Chile) Lucas Jose Del Rio Alamos (Argentina) Bruno Jacomy	Can-Am XRS	18:18:13
4	(Spain) Andalucía Rally	1	(Spain) Pau Navarro (France) Michael Metge	Can-Am XRS	09:33:50
4	(Spain) Andalucía Rally	2	(Lithuania) Rokas Baciuška (Spain) Oriol Vidal Montijano	Can-Am XRS	9:44:58
4	(Spain) Andalucía Rally	3	(United States) Austin Jones (Brazil) Gustavo Gugelmin	Can-Am XRS	12:07:50

=== FIA Rally-Raid Championship for T4 Drivers and Co-Drivers ===
Points system

Competitors have to be registered to score points.

- Points for final positions in rally events are awarded as per the following table:

Position	1st	2nd	3rd	4th	5th	6th	7th	8th	9th	10th	11th	12th	13th	14th	15th
Overall points	30	25	20	17	15	13	10	9	8	7	6	5	4	3	2
Leg Points	5	4	3	2	1	0									

- Points for final positions in marathon events are awarded as per the following table:

Position	1st	2nd	3rd	4th	5th	6th	7th	8th	9th	10th	11th	12th	13th	14th	15th
Overall points	50	40	30	25	20	15	10	9	8	7	6	5	4	3	2
Leg Points	5	4	3	2	1	0									

==== Drivers' & Co-Drivers' championships ====
Pos	Driver	DAK (Saudi Arabia)	ABU (United Arab Emirates)	MOR (Morocco)	AND (Spain)	Points
1	(Lithuania) Rokas Baciuska	2^{68}	2^{39}	1^{44}	2^{25}	176
2	(Poland) Marek Goczał	3^{68}	1^{50}	4^{34}	4^{18}	170
3	(United States) Austin Jones	1^{83}	3^{39}	5^{28}	3^{17}	167
4	(Spain) Pau Navarro			2^{37}	1^{29}	66
5	(Chile) Lucas del Rio	8^{210}	4^{25}	3^{28}		63
6	(Poland) Michał Goczał	4^{57}				57
7	(Brazil) Rodrigo Luppi De Oliveira	5^{49}				49
8	(Poland) Aron Domżała	6^{34}				34
9	(Brazil) Bruno Conti De Oliveira			6^{34}		34
10	(Spain) Gael Queralt	7^{10}				10
Pos	Driver	DAK (Saudi Arabia)	ABU (United Arab Emirates)	MOR (Morocco)	AND (Spain)	Points

Pos	Driver	DAK (Saudi Arabia)	ABU (United Arab Emirates)	MOR (Morocco)	AND (Spain)	Points
1	(Poland) Lukasz Laskawiec	3^{68}	1^{50}	4^{34}	4^{18}	170
2	(Brazil) Gustavo Gugelmin	1^{83}	3^{39}	5^{18}	3^{17}	167
3	(Spain) Oriol Mena	2^{68}	2^{39}			107
4	(Brazil) Maykel Justo	5^{49}		6^{24}		73
5	(Spain) Oriol Vidal Montijano			1^{44}	2^{25}	69
6	(France) Michael Metge			2^{37}	1^{29}	66
7	(Poland) Szymon Gospodarczyk	4^{57}				57
8	(Poland) Maciej Marton	6^{34}				34
9	(Argentina) Bruno Jacomy			3^{28}		28
10	(Chile) Alvaro Juan Leon Quintanilla		4^{25}			25
11	(Chile) Americo Aliaga	7^{10}				10
12	(Spain) Sergi Brugue	8^{10}				10
Pos	Driver	DAK (Saudi Arabia)	ABU (United Arab Emirates)	MOR (Morocco)	AND (Spain)	Points

== T5 ==
=== Entry list ===
FIA Rally-Raid Championship T5 Teams & Drivers
Constructor	Vehicle	Team	Driver	Co-drivers	Rounds
Ford	Ford Cargo 4x4	Fesh Fesh Team	(Czech Republic) Tomáš Vrátný	(Czech Republic) Jaromír Martinec (Poland) Bartłomiej Boba	1
Iveco	Iveco PowerStar	Fesh Fesh Team	(Andorra) Albert Llovera	(Spain) Jorge Salvador Coderch (Spain) Marc Torres	1
Iveco	Iveco PowerStar	Big Shock Racing	(Czech Republic) Martin Macík	(Czech Republic) František Tomášek (Czech Republic) David Švanda	1
Iveco	Iveco PowerStar	Big Shock Racing	(Netherlands) Kees Koolen	(Netherlands) Wouter De Graaff (Netherlands) Gijsbert Van Uden	1
Iveco	Iveco PowerStar	Big Shock Racing	(Czech Republic) Martin Šoltys	(Czech Republic) Roman Krejčí (Czech Republic) Jakub Jirinec	1

=== Results ===
Round	Rally name	Podium finishers			
Round	Rally name	Rank	Driver/Co-Driver	Car	Time
1	(Saudi Arabia) Dakar Rally	1	(Czech Republic) Martin Macík (Czech Republic) František Tomášek (Czech Republic) David Švanda	Iveco PowerStar	46:21:45
1	(Saudi Arabia) Dakar Rally	2	(Netherlands) Kees Koolen (Netherlands) Wouter De Graaff (Netherlands) Gijsbert Van Uden	Iveco PowerStar	52:56:23
2	(United Arab Emirates) Abu Dhabi Desert Challenge	1	(Netherlands) Kees Koolen (Netherlands) Wouter De Graaff (Italy) PaUlo Ceci	Iveco PowerStar	24:14:58
3	(Morocco) Rallye du Maroc	1	(Czech Republic) Martin Macík (Czech Republic) František Tomášek (Czech Republic) David Švanda	Iveco PowerStar	18:55:43
3	(Morocco) Rallye du Maroc	2	(Netherlands) Kees Koolen (Netherlands) Wouter De Graaff (Italy) PaUlo Ceci	Iveco PowerStar	19:52:42
3	(Morocco) Rallye du Maroc	3	(Czech Republic) Tomas Vratny (Poland) Bartlomiej Boba (Czech Republic) Jaromir Martinec	Iveco PowerStar	0:54:45

=== FIA Rally-Raid Championship for T5 Drivers and Co-Drivers ===
Points system

Competitors have to be registered to score points.

- Points for final positions in rally events are awarded as per the following table:

Position	1st	2nd	3rd	4th	5th	6th	7th	8th	9th	10th	11th	12th	13th	14th	15th
Overall points	30	25	20	17	15	13	10	9	8	7	6	5	4	3	2
Leg Points	5	4	3	2	1	0									

- Points for final positions in marathon events are awarded as per the following table:

Position	1st	2nd	3rd	4th	5th	6th	7th	8th	9th	10th	11th	12th	13th	14th	15th
Overall points	50	40	30	25	20	15	10	9	8	7	6	5	4	3	2
Leg Points	5	4	3	2	1	0									

==== Drivers' & Co-Drivers' championships ====
Pos	Driver	DAK (Saudi Arabia)	ABU (United Arab Emirates)	MOR (Morocco)	AND (Spain)	Points
1	(Netherlands) Kees Koolen	2^{86}	1^{54}	2^{46}		186
2	(Czech Republic) Martin Macík	1^{108}		1^{52}		160
3	(Czech Republic) Tomáš Vrátný	Ret		3^{37}		37
	(Andorra) Albert Llovera	Ret				0
	(Czech Republic) Martin Šoltys	Ret				0
Pos	Driver	DAK (Saudi Arabia)	ABU (United Arab Emirates)	MOR (Morocco)	AND (Spain)	Points

Pos	Driver	DAK (Saudi Arabia)	ABU (United Arab Emirates)	MOR (Morocco)	AND (Spain)	Points
1	(Netherlands) Wouter De Graaf	2^{86}	1^{54}	2^{46}		186
2	(Czech Republic) František Tomášek (Czech Republic) David Švanda	1^{108}		1^{52}		160
3	(Netherlands) Gijsbert Van Uden	4^{86}	2^{54}			140
4	(Italy) Paolo Ceci			4^{46}		46
5	(Czech Republic) Jaromír Martinec (Poland) Bartłomiej Boba			5^{37}		37
Pos	Driver	DAK (Saudi Arabia)	ABU (United Arab Emirates)	MOR (Morocco)	AND (Spain)	Points

== RallyGP ==
=== Entry list ===
RallyGP Teams & Riders
Constructor	Bike	Team	Rider	Rounds
Gas Gas	450 Rally Factory	(Austria) Gas Gas Factory Racing Rally Team	(United Kingdom) Sam Sunderland	1–2
Gas Gas	450 Rally Factory	(Austria) Gas Gas Factory Racing Rally Team	(Australia) Daniel Sanders	1
Hero	450 Rally	(India) Hero Motorsports Team Rally	(South Africa) Aaron Mare	1
Hero	450 Rally	(India) Hero Motorsports Team Rally	(Portugal) Joaquim Rodrigues	1–2
Hero	450 Rally	(India) Hero Motorsports Team Rally	(Argentina) Franco Caimi	2
Hero	450 Rally	(India) Hero Motorsports Team Rally	(Botswana) Ross Branch	2
Honda	CRF 450 Rally	(Japan) Monster Energy Honda Team	(United States) Ricky Brabec	1–2
Honda	CRF 450 Rally	(Japan) Monster Energy Honda Team	(Chile) José Ignacio Cornejo	1–2
Honda	CRF 450 Rally	(Japan) Monster Energy Honda Team	(Chile) Pablo Quintanilla	1–2
Honda	CRF 450 Rally	(Japan) Monster Energy Honda Team	(Spain) Joan Barreda	1
Husqvarna	450 Rally Factory	(Austria) Rockstar Energy Husqvarna Factory Racing	(United States) Skyler Howes	1–2
Husqvarna	450 Rally Factory	(Austria) Rockstar Energy Husqvarna Factory Racing	(Argentina) Luciano Benavides	1–2
Husqvarna	450 Rally Factory	(Netherlands) HT Rally Raid Husqvarna Racing	(France) Xavier de Soultrait	1
KTM	450 Rally Factory	(Austria) Red Bull KTM Factory Racing	(Argentina) Kevin Benavides	1–2
KTM	450 Rally Factory	(Austria) Red Bull KTM Factory Racing	(Austria) Matthias Walkner	1–2
KTM	450 Rally Factory	(Austria) Red Bull KTM Factory Racing	(Australia) Toby Price	1–2
KTM	450 Rally Factory	(Czech Republic) Orion - Moto Racing Group	(Czech Republic) Martin Michek	1–2
Sherco	450 Sef Rally	(France) Sherco TVS Rally Factory	(Spain) Lorenzo Santolino	1–2
Sherco	450 Sef Rally	(France) Sherco TVS Rally Factory	(Portugal) Rui Gonçalves	1
Yamaha	WR450F	(Japan) Monster Energy Yamaha Rally Team	(France) Adrien Van Beveren	1
Yamaha	WR450F	(Japan) Monster Energy Yamaha Rally Team	(Botswana) Ross Branch	1

=== Results ===
Round	Rally name	Podium finishers			
Round	Rally name	Rank	Rider	Bike	Time
1	(Saudi Arabia) Dakar Rally	1	(United Kingdom) Sam Sunderland	Gas Gas 450 Rally Factory Replica	38:47:30
1	(Saudi Arabia) Dakar Rally	2	(Chile) Pablo Quintanilla	Honda CRF450 Rally	38:50:57
1	(Saudi Arabia) Dakar Rally	3	(Austria) Matthias Walkner	KTM 450 Rally Factory Replica	38:54:17
2	(United Arab Emirates) Abu Dhabi Desert Challenge	1	(United Kingdom) Sam Sunderland	Gas Gas 450 Rally Factory Replica	16:54:24
2	(United Arab Emirates) Abu Dhabi Desert Challenge	2	(United States) Ricky Brabec	Honda CRF450 Rally	16:57:32
2	(United Arab Emirates) Abu Dhabi Desert Challenge	3	(Chile) Pablo Quintanilla	Honda CRF450 Rally	16:58:20
3	(Morocco) Rallye du Maroc	1	(United States) Skyler Howes	Husqvarna 450 Rally Factory	16:30:29
3	(Morocco) Rallye du Maroc	2	(Argentina) Luciano Benavides	Husqvarna 450 Rally Factory	16:03:42
3	(Morocco) Rallye du Maroc	3	(Chile) José Ignacio Cornejo	Honda CRF450 Rally	16:54:04
4	(Spain) Andalucía Rally	1	(France) Adrien Van Beveren	Honda CRF450 Rally	09:58:48
4	(Spain) Andalucía Rally	2	(Argentina) Kevin Benavides	KTM 450 Rally Factory Replica	10:02:02
4	(Spain) Andalucía Rally	3	(Argentina) Luciano Benavides	Husqvarna 450 Rally Factory	10:05:25

=== FIM Rally-Raid World Championship for Riders and Manufacturers ===
Points system

- A rider has to be registered to score points
- Points for final positions in rally events are awarded as per the following table:

Position	1st	2nd	3rd	4th	5th	6th	7th	8th	9th	10th	11th	12th	13th	14th	15th+
Overall points	25	20	16	13	11	10	9	8	7	6	5	4	3	2	1

- A coefficient of 1.5 will be applied to marathon events. The result will be rounded up to the nearest integer.

==== Rider's championship ====
Pos	Driver	DAK (Saudi Arabia)	ABU (United Arab Emirates)	MOR (Morocco)	AND (Spain)	Points
1	(United Kingdom) Sam Sunderland	1^{38}	1^{25}	5^{11}	5^{11}	85
2	(United States) Ricky Brabec	7^{14}	2^{20}	3^{16}	7^{9}	59
3	(France) Adrien Van Beveren	4^{20}		4^{13}	1^{25}	58
4	(Argentina) Luciano Benavides	10^{9}	9^{7}	2^{20}	3^{16}	53
5	(Chile) Pablo Quintanilla	2^{30}	3^{16}		10^{6}	52
6	(Chile) José Ignacio Cornejo	6^{15}	7^{9}	7^{9}	10^{6}	39
7	(Argentina) Kevin Benavides	16^{2}	12^{4}	6^{10}	2^{20}	36
8	(Austria) Matthias Walkner	3^{24}	5^{11}			35
9	(Spain) Lorenzo Santolino	9^{11}	11^{5}	11^{5}	4^{13}	34
10	(United States) Skyler Howes	Ret	10^{6}	1^{25}		31
11	(Portugal) Joaquim Rodrigues	11^{8}	6^{10}		8^{8}	26
12	(Australia) Toby Price	8^{12}	4^{13}			25
13	(Botswana) Ross Branch	Ret	13^{3}	8^{8}	6^{10}	21
14	(Argentina) Franco Caimi		8^{8}	9^{7}	11^{5}	20
15	(Spain) Joan Barreda	5^{17}				17
16	(Portugal) Rui Gonçalves	14^{3}		12^{4}	9^{7}	14
17	(France) Xavier de Soultrait	12^{6}				6
18	(South Africa) Aaron Mare	13^{5}				5
19	(Czech Republic) Martin Michek	15^{2}	NC			2
	(Australia) Daniel Sanders	Ret				0
Pos	Driver	DAK (Saudi Arabia)	ABU (United Arab Emirates)	MOR (Morocco)	AND (Spain)	Points

==== Manufacturer's championship ====
Points system

- Points are awarded to the top-two finishing entries for each manufacturer.

Pos	Manufacturer	DAK (Saudi Arabia)	ABU (United Arab Emirates)	MOR (Morocco)	AND (Spain)	Points
1	Monster Energy Honda Team	47	36	29	34	146
2	Red Bull KTM Factory Racing	36	24	10	20	90
3	Gas Gas Factory Racing	38	25	11	11	85
4	Husqvarna Factory Racing	9	13	45	16	83
5	Hero Motorsports Team Rally	13	18	15	18	64
6	Sherco Factory	14	5	9	20	48
7	Orion - Moto Racing Group	2	0			2
Pos	Manufacturer	DAK (Saudi Arabia)	ABU (United Arab Emirates)	MOR (Morocco)	AND (Spain)	Points

== Rally2 ==
=== Entry list ===
Rally2 Teams & Riders
Constructor	Bike	Team	Rider	Rounds
BMW	BMW G450X Rally	(Spain) Club Aventura Touareg	(Spain) José Maria García	1
Fantic	Fantic 450 Rally	(Italy) Team Franco Picco	(Italy) Franco Picco	1–2
Honda	Honda 450CRF Rally	(Italy) RS Moto Racing Team	(Italy) Giovanni Gritti	1
Honda	Honda 450CRF Rally	(Italy) RS Moto Racing Team	(Italy) Francesco Catanese	1
Honda	Honda 450CRF Rally	(Italy) RS Moto Racing Team	(France) Julien Barthélémy	1
Honda	Honda 450CRF Rally	(Italy) RS Moto Racing Team	(Switzerland) Nicolas Monnin	1
Honda	Honda 450CRF Rally	(Italy) RS Moto Racing Team	(France) Kévin Durand	1
Honda	Honda CRF450RX	(Portugal) Team Bianchi Prata - Honda	(Portugal) Arcélio Couto	1
Honda	Honda CRF450RX	(Portugal) Team Bianchi Prata - Honda	(Portugal) Pedro Bianchi Prata	1
Husqvarna	Husqvarna FR450 Rally	(Netherlands) HT Rally Raid Husqvarna Racing	(Netherlands) Mirjam Pol	1
Husqvarna	Husqvarna FR450 Rally	(Netherlands) HT Rally Raid Husqvarna Racing	(Argentina) Diego Noras	1
Husqvarna	Husqvarna FR450 Rally	(Netherlands) HT Rally Raid Husqvarna Racing	(Canada) Jack Lundin	1
Husqvarna	Husqvarna FR450 Rally	(Netherlands) HT Rally Raid Husqvarna Racing	(Belgium) Walter Roelants	1
Husqvarna	Husqvarna FR450 Rally	(Netherlands) HT Rally Raid Husqvarna Racing	(France) Romain Dumontier	2
Husqvarna	Husqvarna FR450 Rally	(Netherlands) HT Rally Raid Husqvarna Racing	(South Africa) Charan Moore	2
Husqvarna	Husqvarna FR450 Rally		(Slovenia) Simon Marcic	1
Husqvarna	Husqvarna FR450 Rally	(Italy) Solarys Racing	(Italy) Paolo Lucci	1–2
Husqvarna	Husqvarna 450 Rally Factory Replica	(France) RS Concept	(France) Martin Bonnet	1
Husqvarna	Husqvarna 450 Rally Factory Replica	(France) Xtrem Garage	(France) Jeremy Poncet	1
Husqvarna	Husqvarna 450 Rally Factory Replica	(Italy) Rally POV	(Italy) Tiziano Interno	1
Husqvarna	Husqvarna 450 Rally Factory Replica	(Italy) ADR Africa Dream Racing	(Italy) Leonardo Tonelli	1
Husqvarna	Husqvarna 450 Rally Replica	(Poland) Duust Rally Team	(Poland) Konrad Dąbrowski	1–2
Husqvarna	Husqvarna 450 Rally Replica	(Czech Republic) Orion Dakar Team	(Lithuania) Arūnas Gelažninkas	1
Husqvarna	Husqvarna 450 Rally Replica	(Spain) Xraids Clinicas Cres	(Spain) Sandra Gómez	1
Husqvarna	Husqvarna 450 Rally Replica	Morocco Racing Team	(Morocco) Harite Gabari	1
Husqvarna	Husqvarna 450 Rally Replica	(Spain) TwinTrail Racing Team	(Spain) Albert Martin	1
Husqvarna	Husqvarna 450 Rally Replica	(Spain) Melilla Sport Capital	(Spain) Rachid Al-Lal Lahadil	1
Husqvarna	Husqvarna 450 Rally Replica	(Czech Republic) Jantar Team S.R.O.	(Czech Republic) David Pabiska	1
Husqvarna	Husqvarna 450 Rally Replica	(Italy) Joyride Race Service	(Italy) Lorenzo Fanottoli	1
Husqvarna	Husqvarna 450 Rally	(France) Team Dumontier Racing	(France) Romain Dumontier	1
Husqvarna	Husqvarna 450 Rally	(France) Team Dumontier Racing	(Belgium) Jerome Martiny	1
Husqvarna	Husqvarna 450 Rally	(United Arab Emirates) Vendetta Racing	(United Kingdom) David McBride	1
Husqvarna	Husqvarna 450 Rally	(Spain) Nomadas Adventure	(Greece) Vasileios Boudros	1
Husqvarna	Husqvarna 450 Rally	(France) RS Concept	(France) Roch Wolville	1
Husqvarna	Husqvarna 450 Rally	(Colombia) Calidoso Racing Team	(Colombia) Giordano Pacheco	1
Husqvarna	Husqvarna FE450		(France) Sebastien Cojean	1
KTM	KTM 450 Rally Factory Replica	(France) Team Baïnes Rally	(France) Camille Chapeliere	1
KTM	KTM 450 Rally Factory Replica	(Netherlands) BAS World KTM Racing	(South Africa) Bradley Cox	1–2
KTM	KTM 450 Rally Factory Replica	(Netherlands) BAS World KTM Racing	(Belgium) Mathieu Liebaert	1
KTM	KTM 450 Rally Factory Replica	(France) LG Rally Team	(France) Julien Jagu	1
KTM	KTM 450 Rally Factory Replica	(France) Nomade Racing	(France) Mathieu Doveze	1
KTM	KTM 450 Rally Factory Replica	(Spain) Rieju - FN Speed Team	(Spain) Marc Calmet	1
KTM	KTM 450 Rally Factory Replica	(France) Team Repar'Stores	(France) Romain Leloup	1
KTM	KTM 450 Rally Factory Replica	(Spain) Team Monforte Rally	(Spain) Eduardo Iglesias	1
KTM	KTM 450 Rally Factory Replica	(Italy) Terrerosse	(Italy) Domenico Cipollone	1
KTM	KTM 450 Rally Factory Replica	(France) Tech3 KTM Factory Racing	(Italy) Danilo Petrucci	1
KTM	KTM 450 Rally Factory Replica	(Italy) Team Motoclub Yashica	(Italy) Andrea Winkler	1
KTM	KTM 450 Rally Factory Replica	(Italy) Team Motoclub Yashica	(Italy) Aldo Winkler	1
KTM	KTM 450 Rally Factory Replica	(Czech Republic) Klymciw Racing	(Austria) Wolfgang Payr	1
KTM	KTM 450 Rally Factory Replica	(Italy) Agif Al Aviv	(Italy) Elio Aglioni	1
KTM	KTM 450 Rally Replica	(Netherlands) BAS World KTM Racing	(United States) Mason Klein	1–2
KTM	KTM 450 Rally Replica	(Netherlands) BAS World KTM Racing	(Germany) Mike Wiedemann	1
KTM	KTM 450 Rally Replica	(Netherlands) BAS World KTM Racing	(Eswatini) Walter Terblanche	1
KTM	KTM 450 Rally Replica	(Czech Republic) Strojrent Racing	(Czech Republic) Jan Brabec	1
KTM	KTM 450 Rally Replica	(Spain) Xraids Experience Team	(Argentina) Diego Gamaliel Llanos	1
KTM	KTM 450 Rally Replica	(Spain) Xraids Experience Team	(Argentina) Joaquin Debeljuh	1
KTM	KTM 450 Rally Replica	(Spain) Xraids Experience Team	(Chile) John William Medina	1
KTM	KTM 450 Rally Replica	(Spain) Xraids Experience Team	(Ecuador) Alex Cueva	1
KTM	KTM 450 Rally Replica	(France) Nomade Racing	(France) Jean-Loup Lepan	1
KTM	KTM 450 Rally Replica	(France) Nomade Racing	(France) Philippe Gendron	1
KTM	KTM 450 Rally Replica	(Czech Republic) Moto Racing Group (MRG)	(Czech Republic) Milan Engel	1
KTM	KTM 450 Rally Replica	(France) Team Esprit KTM	(France) Benjamin Melot	1
KTM	KTM 450 Rally Replica		(South Africa) Charan Moore	1
KTM	KTM 450 Rally Replica	(Poland) Duust Rally Team	(Kuwait) Mohammed Jaffar	1
KTM	KTM 450 Rally Replica	(Romania) Autonet Motorcycle Team	(Romania) Emanuel Gyenes	1
KTM	KTM 450 Rally Replica	(China) Wu Pu Da Hai Dao Dakar Rally Team	(China) Zaker Yakp	1
KTM	KTM 450 Rally Replica	(China) Wu Pu Da Hai Dao Dakar Rally Team	(China) Zhang Min	1
KTM	KTM 450 Rally Replica	(China) Wu Pu Da Hai Dao Dakar Rally Team	(China) Zhao Hongyi	1
KTM	KTM 450 Rally Replica	(France) Team All Tracks	(France) Charlie Herbst	1
KTM	KTM 450 Rally Replica	(United Kingdom) Lyndon Poskitt Racing	(Botswana) John Kelly	1
KTM	KTM 450 Rally Replica	Morocco Racing Team	(Morocco) Ali Oukerbouch	1
KTM	KTM 450 Rally Replica	Morocco Racing Team	(Morocco) Mohamedsaid Aoulad Ali	1
KTM	KTM 450 Rally Replica	(France) Juracing Team	(France) Jonathan Chotard	1
KTM	KTM 450 Rally Replica		(South Africa) Stuart Gregory	1
KTM	KTM 450 Rally Replica	(Spain) TwinTrail Racing Team	(Spain) Carles Falcon	1
KTM	KTM 450 Rally Replica	(Spain) TwinTrail Racing Team	(Spain) Isaac Feliu	1
KTM	KTM 450 Rally Replica		(Chile) Cesar Zumaran	1
KTM	KTM 450 Rally Replica	(France) Cavelius Team	(France) Philippe Cavelius	1
KTM	KTM 450 Rally Replica	(Mongolia) Team Lkhamaa	(Mongolia) Lkhamaa Namchin	1
KTM	KTM 450 Rally Replica	(France) Team Dumontier Racing	(France) Edouard Leconte	1
KTM	KTM 450 Rally Replica	(Italy) Caravanserraglio Rally Racing Team	(Italy) Lorenzo Piolini	1
KTM	KTM 450 Rally Replica		(France) Dominique Robin	1
KTM	KTM 450 Rally Replica	(Serbia) Saghmeister Team	(Serbia) Gabor Saghmeister	1
KTM	KTM 450 Rally Replica	(France) Team Giroud	(France) Patrice Massador	1
KTM	KTM 450 Rally Replica	(Ecuador) Puga Team	(Ecuador) Juan Carlos Puga	1
KTM	KTM 450 Rally Replica	(Ecuador) Puga Team	(Ecuador) Juan Puga	1
KTM	KTM 450 Rally Replica	(Italy) Team JBRally	(Italy) Giovanni Stigliano	1
KTM	KTM 450 Rally Replica	(France) Team RS Concept	(France) Bertrand Gavard	1
KTM	KTM 450 Rally Replica	(Spain) Nomadas Adventure	(Australia) Andrew Houlihan	1
KTM	KTM 450 Rally Replica	(France) Aventure Moto 61	(France) Norbert Dubois	1
KTM	KTM 450 Rally	(Spain) Rieju - FN Speed Team	(Chile) Patricio Cabrera	1
KTM	KTM 450 Rally	(Portugal) Credit Agricola - Mario Patrão Motosport	(Portugal) Mario Patrão	1
KTM	KTM 450 Rally	(France) RS Concept	(Belgium) Mikaël Despontin	1
KTM	KTM 450 Rally	(France) Happyness Racing JBS Moto	(France) David Gaits	1
KTM	KTM 450 Rally		(Italy) Cesare Zacchetti	1
KTM	KTM 450 Rally		(France) Parice Carillon	1
KTM	KTM 450 Rally	(Spain) Nomadas Adventure	(Mexico) Juan Pablo Guillen	1
KTM	KTM 450 Rally	(France) Team Nomade Racing	(France) Samuel Fremy	1
KTM	KTM 450 Rally		(South Africa) Werner Kennedy	1
KTM	KTM 450 Rally	(Spain) Xraids Experience	(Spain) José Arvest Portero	1
KTM	KTM 450 Rally	(United Arab Emirates) Vendetta Racing	(United Kingdom) David Mabbs	1
KTM	KTM 450 Rally	(Argentina) MAN Team	(Argentina) Matias Notti	1
KTM	KTM 450 Rally	(Mongolia) Ayanga	(Mongolia) Battur Baatar	1
KTM	KTM 450 Rally	(Germany) Reality Beats Fiction Racing Team	(Germany) Stephan Preuss	1
KTM	KTM 450 Rally	(Germany) Reality Beats Fiction Racing Team	(Germany) Thomas Preuss	1
KTM	KTM 450 Rally	(United Arab Emirates) MX Ride Dubai	(Kuwait) Abdullah Al Shatti	1
KTM	KTM 450 Rally	(Portugal) Mario Patrão Motorsport	(Mozambique) Paulo Oliveira	1
KTM	KTM 450 Rally	(France) Horizon Moto 95	(France) Amaury Baratin	1
KTM	KTM 450 EXC	(Netherlands) BAS World KTM Racing	(Netherlands) Wiljan Van Wikselaar	1
KTM	KTM 450 EXC	(Spain) Club Aventura Touareg	(Portugal) Alexandre Azinhais	1
KTM	KTM 450 EXC		(France) Audrey Rossat	1
KTM	KTM 450 EXC	(France) Team Fabaventure	(France) Fabrice Chirent	1
KTM	KTM 500 EXC-F	(Spain) Nomadas Adventure	(Mexico) Antonio Guillen	1
Sherco	Sherco 450SEFR		(Netherlands) Bram van der Wouden	1
Yamaha	Yamaha WRF450 Rally	(Spain) Pont Grup Yamaha	(Spain) Sara García	1
Yamaha	Yamaha WRF450 Rally	(Spain) Pont Grup Yamaha	(Spain) Javi Vega	1
Yamaha	Yamaha WRF450 Rally	(France) Drag'On Rally Team	(United Kingdom) Simon Hewitt	1
Yamaha	Yamaha WRF450 Rally	(France) Drag'On Rally Team	(France) Guillaume Chollet	1
Yamaha	Yamaha WRF450 Rally	(France) M.O.R.AL	(France) Stéphane Darques	1

=== Results ===
Round	Rally name	Podium finishers			
Round	Rally name	Rank	Rider	Bike	Time
1	(Saudi Arabia) Dakar Rally	1	(United States) Mason Klein	KTM 450 Rally Replica	39:36:37
1	(Saudi Arabia) Dakar Rally	2	(France) Camille Chapeliere	KTM 450 Rally Factory Replica	41:27:00
1	(Saudi Arabia) Dakar Rally	3	(France) Romain Dumontier	Husqvarna 450 Rally	41:47:46
2	(United Arab Emirates) Abu Dhabi Desert Challenge	1	(United States) Mason Klein	KTM 450 Rally Replica	17:38:20
2	(United Arab Emirates) Abu Dhabi Desert Challenge	2	(France) Romain Dumontier	Husqvarna 450 Rally	18:14:39
2	(United Arab Emirates) Abu Dhabi Desert Challenge	3	(Italy) Paolo Lucci	Husqvarna 450 Rally	18:41:32
3	(Morocco) Rallye du Maroc	1	(United States) Mason Klein	KTM 450 Rally Replica	17:18:07
3	(Morocco) Rallye du Maroc	2	(South Africa) Bradley Cox	KTM 450 Rally Replica	17:58:32
3	(Morocco) Rallye du Maroc	3	(France) Romain Dumontier	Husqvarna 450 Rally	18:08:04
4	(Spain) Andalucía Rally	1	(United States) Mason Klein	KTM 450 Rally Replica	10:32:26
4	(Spain) Andalucía Rally	2	(South Africa) Bradley Cox	KTM 450 Rally Replica	10:44:34
4	(Spain) Andalucía Rally	3	(France) Romain Dumontier	Husqvarna 450 Rally	10:54:37

=== FIM Rally-Raid World Cup for Rally2 Riders ===
Points system

- Points for final positions in rally events are awarded as per the following table:

Position	1st	2nd	3rd	4th	5th	6th	7th	8th	9th	10th	11th	12th	13th	14th	15th+
Overall points	25	20	16	13	11	10	9	8	7	6	5	4	3	2	1

- A coefficient of 1.5 will be applied to marathon events. The result will be rounded up to the nearest integer.

==== Rider's championship ====
Pos	Rider	DAK (Saudi Arabia)	ABU (United Arab Emirates)	MOR (Morocco)	AND (Spain)	Points
1	(United States) Mason Klein	1^{38}	1^{25}	1^{25}	1^{25}	113
2	(France) Romain Dumontier	3^{24}	2^{20}	3^{16}	3^{16}	76
3	(South Africa) Bradley Cox	5^{17}		2^{20}	2^{20}	57
4	(Poland) Konrad Dąbrowski	7^{14}	4^{13}	4^{13}	5^{11}	51
5	(France) Camille Chapeliere	2^{30}				30
6	(Czech Republic) Jan Brabec	4^{20}			6^{10}	30
7	(Portugal) Mario Patrão	20^{2}		5^{11}	4^{13}	26
8	(Italy) Franco Picco	50^{2}	6^{10}		8^{8}	20
9	(Italy) Paolo Lucci		3^{16}			16
10	(Argentina) Diego Gamaliel Llanos	6^{15}				15
11	(South Africa) Charan Moore	14^{3}	5^{11}			14
12	(Netherlands) Mirjam Pol	27^{2}		6^{10}		12
13	(Lithuania) Arūnas Gelažninkas	8^{12}				12
14	(Spain) Sandra Gómez	40^{2}			7^{9}	11
15	(France) Julien Jagu	12^{6}				6
16	(France) Benjamin Melot	13^{5}				5
17	(France) Mathieu Doveze	15^{2}				2
18	(Chile) Patricio Cabrera	16^{2}				2
19	(Kuwait) Mohammed Jaffar	17^{2}				2
20	(Romania) Emanuel Gyenes	18^{2}				2
21	(China) Zaker Yakp	19^{2}				2
22	(Portugal) Mario Patrão	20^{2}				2
23	(France) Charlie Herbst	21^{2}				2
24	(Netherlands) Wiljan Van Wikselaar	22^{2}				2
25	(Italy) Giovanni Gritti	23^{2}				2
26	(Botswana) John Kelly	24^{2}				2
27	(United Kingdom) David McBride	25^{2}				2
28	(Germany) Mike Wiedemann	26^{2}				2
29	(Netherlands) Mirjam Pol	27^{2}				2
30	(France) Martin Bonnet	28^{2}				2
31	(Belgium) Mikaël Despontin	29^{2}				2
32	(Spain) Marc Calmet	30^{2}				2
33	(Argentina) Diego Noras	31^{2}				2
34	(Slovenia) Simon Marcic	32^{2}				2
35	(France) Romain Leloup	33^{2}				2
36	(Morocco) Ali Oukerbouch	34^{2}				2
37	(Belgium) Mathieu Liebaert	35^{2}				2
38	(Argentina) Joaquin Debeljuh	36^{2}				2
39	(France) David Gaits	37^{2}				2
40	(Canada) Jack Lundin	38^{2}				2
41	(China) Zhang Min	39^{2}				2
42	(Spain) Sandra Gómez	40^{2}				2
43	(Morocco) Harite Gabari	41^{2}				2
44	(France) Jonathan Chotard	42^{2}				2
45	(South Africa) Stuart Gregory	43^{2}				2
46	(Italy) Cesare Zacchetti	44^{2}				2
47	(France) Patrice Carillon	45^{2}				2
48	(Spain) Carles Falcon	46^{2}				2
49	(Portugal) Alexandre Azinhais	47^{2}				2
50	(Greece) Vasileios Boudros	48^{2}				2
51	(Spain) Albert Martin	49^{2}				2
52	(Italy) Francesco Catanese	51^{2}				2
53	(Chile) John William Medina	52^{2}				2
54	(Spain) Sara García	53^{2}				2
55	(Mexico) Juan Pablo Guillen	54^{2}				2
56	(Chile) Cesar Zumaran	55^{2}				2
57	(Spain) Eduardo Iglesias	56^{2}				2
58	(China) Zhao Hongyi	57^{2}				2
59	(Portugal) Arcélio Couto	58^{2}				2
60	(France) Jeremy Poncet	59^{2}				2
Pos	Rider	DAK (Saudi Arabia)	ABU (United Arab Emirates)	MOR (Morocco)	AND (Spain)	Points

Pos	Rider	DAK (Saudi Arabia)	ABU (United Arab Emirates)	MOR (Morocco)	AND (Spain)	Points
61	(France) Sebastien Cojean	60^{2}				2
62	(France) Roch Wolville	61^{2}				2
63	(France) Philippe Cavelius	62^{2}				2
64	(Mongolia) Lkhamaa Namchin	63^{2}				2
65	(Eswatini) Walter Terblanche	64^{2}				2
66	(Spain) Javi Vega	65^{2}				2
67	(Italy) Domenico Cipollone	66^{2}				2
68	(France) Samuel Fremy	67^{2}				2
69	(Italy) Danilo Petrucci	68^{2}				2
70	(South Africa) Werner Kennedy	69^{2}				2
71	(Spain) José Arvest Portero	70^{2}				2
72	(France) Julien Barthélémy	71^{2}				2
73	(United Kingdom) David Mabbs	72^{2}				2
74	(France) Edouard Leconte	73^{2}				2
75	(Argentina) Matias Notti	74^{2}				2
76	(Italy) Andrea Winkler	75^{2}				2
77	(France) Audrey Rossat	76^{2}				2
78	(France) Fabrice Chirent	77^{2}				2
79	(Italy) Lorenzo Piolini	78^{2}				2
80	(France) Dominique Robin	79^{2}				2
81	(Spain) Rachid Al-Lal Lahadil	80^{2}				2
82	(Italy) Tiziano Interno	81^{2}				2
83	(Portugal) Pedro Bianchi Prata	82^{2}				2
84	(Serbia) Gabor Saghmeister	83^{2}				2
85	(Ecuador) Alex Cueva	84^{2}				2
86	(Mongolia) Battur Baatar	85^{2}				2
87	(Germany) Stephan Preuss	86^{2}				2
88	(United Kingdom) Simon Hewitt	87^{2}				2
89	(France) Philippe Gendron	88^{2}				2
90	(Switzerland) Nicolas Monnin	89^{2}				2
91	(Kuwait) Abdullah Al Shatti	90^{2}				2
92	(Austria) Wolfgang Payr	91^{2}				2
93	(Mozambique) Paulo Oliveira	92^{2}				2
94	(France) Patrice Massador	93^{2}				2
95	(Italy) Aldo Winkler	94^{2}				2
96	(Ecuador) Juan Carlos Puga	95^{2}				2
97	(Italy) Leonardo Tonelli	96^{2}				2
98	(Germany) Thomas Preuss	97^{2}				2
99	(France) Guillaume Chollet	98^{2}				2
100	(France) Stéphane Darques	99^{2}				2
101	(Ecuador) Juan Puga	100^{2}				2
	(Colombia) Giordano Pacheco	Ret				0
	(France) Bertrand Gavard	Ret				0
	(Italy) Giovanni Stigliano	Ret				0
	(Italy) Paolo Lucci	Ret				0
	(Spain) Isaac Feliu	Ret				0
	(Netherlands) Bram van der Wouden	Ret				0
	(Czech Republic) David Pabiska	Ret				0
	(Australia) Andrew Houlihan	Ret				0
	(Belgium) Walter Roelants	Ret				0
	(France) Amaury Baratin	Ret				0
	(Italy) Elio Aglioni	Ret				0
	(Italy) Lorenzo Fanottoli	Ret				0
	(France) Kévin Durand	Ret				0
	(Morocco) Mohamedsaid Aoulad Ali	Ret				0
	(France) Norbert Dubois	Ret				0
	(Mexico) Antonio Guillen	Ret				0
	(Spain) José Maria García	Ret				0
Pos	Rider	DAK (Saudi Arabia)	ABU (United Arab Emirates)	AND (Spain)	MOR (Morocco)	Points

==== FIM Junior trophy ====
Pos	Rider	DAK (Saudi Arabia)	ABU (United Arab Emirates)	MOR (Morocco)	AND (Spain)	Points
1	(United States) Mason Klein	1^{38}	1^{25}	1^{25}	1^{25}	113
2	(Poland) Konrad Dąbrowski	3^{24}	2^{20}	3^{16}	3^{16}	76
3	(South Africa) Bradley Cox	2^{30}		2^{20}	2^{20}	70
4	(France) Jean-Loup Lepan	4^{20}				20
5	(Germany) Mike Wiedemann	5^{17}				17
6	(Italy) Leonardo Tonelli	6^{15}				15
Pos	Rider	DAK (Saudi Arabia)	ABU (United Arab Emirates)	MOR (Morocco)	AND (Spain)	Points

==== FIM Women's trophy ====
Pos	Rider	DAK (Saudi Arabia)	ABU (United Arab Emirates)	MOR (Morocco)	AND (Spain)	Points
1	(Netherlands) Mirjam Pol	1^{38}		1^{25}		63
2	(Spain) Sandra Gómez	2^{30}			1^{25}	55
3	(Spain) Sara García	3^{24}				24
4	(France) Audrey Rossat	4^{20}				20
Pos	Rider	DAK (Saudi Arabia)	ABU (United Arab Emirates)	MOR (Morocco)	AND (Spain)	Points

==== FIM Veteran's trophy ====
Pos	Rider	DAK (Saudi Arabia)	ABU (United Arab Emirates)	MOR (Morocco)	AND (Spain)	Points
1	(Portugal) Mario Patrão	1^{38}		1^{25}	1^{25}	88
2	(Italy) Franco Picco	6^{15}	1^{25}		2^{20}	60
3	(United Kingdom) David McBride	2^{30}				30
4	(Belgium) Mikaël Despontin	3^{24}				24
5	(France) David Gaits	4^{20}				20
6	(Italy) Cesare Zacchetti	5^{17}				17
7	(France) Patrice Carillon	6^{15}				15
8	(Italy) Francesco Catanese	8^{12}				12
9	(France) Roch Wolville	9^{11}				11
10	(France) Philippe Cavelius	10^{9}				9
11	(Italy) Domenico Cipollone	11^{8}				8
12	(France) Samuel Fremy	12^{6}				6
13	(Spain) José Arvest Portero	13^{5}				5
14	(United Kingdom) David Mabbs	14^{3}				3
15	(Argentina) Matias Notti	15^{2}				2
16	(France) Fabrice Chirent	16^{2}				2
17	(France) Dominique Robin	17^{2}				2
18	(Portugal) Pedro Bianchi Prata	18^{2}				2
19	(Serbia) Gabor Saghmeister	19^{2}				2
20	(Ecuador) Alex Cueva	20^{2}				2
21	(Germany) Stephan Preuss	21^{2}				2
22	(France) Philippe Gendron	22^{2}				2
23	(Switzerland) Nicolas Monnin	23^{2}				2
24	(Austria) Wolfgang Payr	24^{2}				2
25	(Mozambique) Paulo Oliveira	25^{2}				2
26	(France) Patrice Massador	26^{2}				2
27	(Italy) Aldo Winkler	27^{2}				2
28	(Ecuador) Juan Carlos Puga	28^{2}				2
29	(Germany) Thomas Preuss	29^{2}				2
30	(France) Stéphane Darques	30^{2}				2
	(Czech Republic) David Pabiska	Ret				0
	(France) Amaury Baratin	Ret				0
	(Italy) Giovanni Stigliano	Ret				0
	(France) Norbert Dubois	Ret				0
	(Australia) Andrew Houlihan	Ret				0
	(Spain) José Maria García	Ret				0
Pos	Rider	DAK (Saudi Arabia)	ABU (United Arab Emirates)	MOR (Morocco)	AND (Spain)	Points

== Quad ==
=== Entry list ===
Constructor	Bike	Team	Rider	Rounds
Can-Am	Can-Am Renegade 850 XXC	Equipo Colombia 4x4	(Colombia) Nicolas Robledo	1
Can-Am	Can-Am Renegade 1000 XXC	Àlex Feliu Competición	(Spain) Àlex Feliu	1
Yamaha	Yamaha YFZ 700	Yamaha Racing - SMX - Drag'On	(France) Alexandre Giroud	1
Yamaha	Yamaha Raptor 700	Drag'On Rally Team	(Argentina) Francisco Moreno	1
Yamaha	Yamaha Raptor 700	Drag'On Rally Team	(France) Vincent Padrona	1
Yamaha	Yamaha Raptor 700	Drag'On Rally Team	(France) Nicolas Martinez	1
Yamaha	Yamaha Raptor 700	Orlen Team	(Poland) Kamil Wiśniewski	1
Yamaha	Yamaha Raptor 700	Del Amo Motorsports/Yamaha Rally Team	(United States) Pablo Copetti	1
Yamaha	Yamaha Raptor 700	Team All Tracks	(France) Sebastien Souday	1
Yamaha	Yamaha Raptor 700	Enrico Racing Team	(Chile) Giovanni Enrico	1
Yamaha	Yamaha Raptor 700	Enrico Racing Team	(Chile) Italo Pedemonte	1
Yamaha	Yamaha Raptor 700	Visit Sant Antoni - Ibiza	(Spain) Toni Vingut	1
Yamaha	Yamaha RR 700	Barth Racing Team	(Czech Republic) Zdenek Tuma	1
Yamaha	Yamaha YFM700R	Verza Rally Team	(Argentina) Carlos Verza	1
Yamaha	Yamaha YFM700R	Team Marcelo Medeiros	(Brazil) Marcelo Medeiros	1
Yamaha	Yamaha YFM700R	Chyr Mari	Aleksandr Maksimov	1
Yamaha	Yamaha YFM700R	7240 Team	(Argentina) Manuel Andújar	1
Yamaha	Yamaha YFM700R	Story Racing S.R.O.	(Lithuania) Laisydas Kancius	1
Yamaha	Yamaha YFM700R	Story Racing S.R.O.	(Czech Republic) Tomas Kubiena	1
Yamaha	Yamaha YFM700R	Xraids Experience	(Paraguay) Nelson Sanabria	1

=== Results ===
Round	Rally name	Podium finishers			
Round	Rally name	Rank	Rider	Vehicle	Time
1	(Saudi Arabia) Dakar Rally	1	(France) Alexandre Giroud	Yamaha YFZ 700	50:00:51
1	(Saudi Arabia) Dakar Rally	2	(Argentina) Francisco Moreno	Yamaha Raptor 700	52:22:02
1	(Saudi Arabia) Dakar Rally	3	(Poland) Kamil Wiśniewski	Yamaha Raptor 700	52:28:16
2	(United Arab Emirates) Abu Dhabi Desert Challenge	1	(United Arab Emirates) Abdulaziz Ahli	Yamaha Raptor 700	22:42:15
2	(United Arab Emirates) Abu Dhabi Desert Challenge	2	(Slovakia) Juraj Varga	Yamaha Raptor 700	24:47:33
2	(United Arab Emirates) Abu Dhabi Desert Challenge	3	(Guatemala) Rodolfo Guillioli	Yamaha Raptor 700	25:35:12
3	(Morocco) Rallye du Maroc	1	(France) Alexandre Giroud	Yamaha YFZ 700	35:49:04
3	(Morocco) Rallye du Maroc	2	(Slovakia) Juraj Varga	Yamaha Raptor 700	60:42:53
4	(Spain) Andalucía Rally	1	(France) Alexandre Giroud	Yamaha YFZ 700	12:09:57
4	(Spain) Andalucía Rally	2	(Slovakia) Juraj Varga	Yamaha Raptor 700	13:57:00
4	(Spain) Andalucía Rally	3	(Poland) Kamil Wiśniewski	Yamaha Raptor 700	13:28:59

=== FIM Rally-Raid World Cup for Quad Riders ===
Points system

- Points for final positions in rally events are awarded as per the following table:

Position	1st	2nd	3rd	4th	5th	6th	7th	8th	9th	10th	11th	12th	13th	14th	15th+
Overall points	25	20	16	13	11	10	9	8	7	6	5	4	3	2	1

- A coefficient of 1.5 will be applied to marathon events. The result will be rounded up to the nearest integer.

==== Rider's championship ====
Pos	Driver	DAK (Saudi Arabia)	ABU (United Arab Emirates)	MOR (Morocco)	AND (Spain)	Points
1	(France) Alexandre Giroud	1^{38}		1^{25}	1^{25}	88
2	(Slovakia) Juraj Varga		2^{20}	2^{20}	2^{20}	60
3	(Poland) Kamil Wiśniewski	3^{24}			3^{16}	40
4	(Argentina) Francisco Moreno	2^{30}				30
5	(United Arab Emirates) Abdulaziz Ahli		1^{25}			25
6	(Czech Republic) Zdenek Tuma	4^{20}				20
7	(Argentina) Carlos Verza	5^{17}				17
8	(Guatemala) Rodolfo Guillioli Schippers		3^{16}			16
9	(Brazil) Marcelo Medeiros	6^{15}				15
10	(Colombia) Nicolas Robledo	7^{14}				14
	(France) Vincent Padrona	Ret				0
	(Spain) Àlex Feliu	Ret				0
	(United States) Pablo Copetti	Ret				0
	Aleksandr Maksimov	Ret				0
	(France) Sebastien Souday	Ret				0
	(Argentina) Manuel Andújar	Ret				0
	(Chile) Giovanni Enrico	Ret				0
	(Lithuania) Laisvydas Kancius	Ret				0
	(Paraguay) Nelson Sanabria	Ret				0
	(Czech Republic) Tomas Kubiena	Ret				0
	(Chile) Italo Pedemonte	Ret				0
	(France) Nicolas Martinez	Ret				0
	(Spain) Toni Vingut	Ret				0
Pos	Driver	DAK (Saudi Arabia)	ABU (United Arab Emirates)	MOR (Morocco)	AND (Spain)	Points

== Rally3 ==
=== Results ===
Round	Rally name	Podium finishers			
Round	Rally name	Rank	Rider	Vehicle	Time
3	(Morocco) Rallye du Maroc	1	(Morocco) Amine Echiguer	KTM 450 Rally Factory Replica	20:31:34
3	(Morocco) Rallye du Maroc	2	(France) Guillaume Borne	Husqvarna 450 Rally Factory	20:45:49
3	(Morocco) Rallye du Maroc	3	(India) Abdul Wahid Tanveer	Sherco 450 Sef Rally	21:00:08
4	(Spain) Andalucía Rally	1	(France) Jeremy Miroir	Honda CRF 450 Rally	10:50:21
4	(Spain) Andalucía Rally	2	(India) Rajendra Revallar Eshwarappa	Sherco 450 Sef Rally	13:21:09
4	(Spain) Andalucía Rally	3	(Morocco) Amine Echiguer	KTM 450 Rally Factory Replica	13:47:48

==== Rider's championship ====
Pos	Driver	DAK (Saudi Arabia)	ABU (United Arab Emirates)	MOR (Morocco)	AND (Spain)	Points
1	(Morocco) Amine Echiguer			1^{25}	3^{16}	41
2	(France) Jeremy Miroir				1^{25}	25
3	(France) Guillaume Borne			2^{20}		20
4	(India) Rajendra Revallar Eshwarappa				2^{20}	20
5	(India) Abdul Wahid Tanveer			3^{16}		16
6	(France) Christophe Lajouanie			4^{13}		13
7	(Spain) Jose Vicente Fernandez Garcia				4^{13}	13
8	(Ecuador) Alex Mauricio Cueva Ojeda			5^{11}		11
9	(Hungary) Richard Hodola			6^{10}		10
10	(France) Mathieu Feuvrier			7^{9}		9
11	(France) Charles Pick			8^{8}		8
12	(France) Benjamin Boudariat			9^{7}		7
Pos	Driver	DAK (Saudi Arabia)	ABU (United Arab Emirates)	MOR (Morocco)	AND (Spain)	Points
