= 2023 FIM E-Xplorer World Cup =

2023 FIM E-Xplorer World Cup
Winner: Team MIE
Previous:	none	Next:	2024

The 2023 FIM E-Xplorer World Cup was the inaugural season of the FIM E-Xplorer World Cup, an off-road series in which teams of one male and one female rider compete on electric motorcycles. MIE were the winning team of the series.

== Calendar ==
A provisional calendar was issued by the FIM in November 2022. It consisted of 6 rounds: Barcelona, Spain; Crans-Montana, Switzerland; Vollore-Montagne, France; an unspecified location in the US; Busan, South Korea and an unspecified location in Asia. The Korea round was subsequently dropped, and then the US and Asia rounds were dropped in favour of a double header at Capo Teulada, Sardinia which was run in conjunction with the penultimate round of the Extreme E series.

Round	Date	Location
1	13 May	Barcelona, Spain
2	24 June	Crans-Montana, Switzerland
3	29 July	Vollore-Montagne, France
4	16 September	(Italy) Capo Teulada, Sardinia
5	17 September	(Italy) Capo Teulada, Sardinia

== Teams and riders ==
Team no.	Team	Bike	No.	Female rider	Rounds	No.	Male rider	Rounds
1	(Australia) MaddWill powered By EBMX	EMBX	90	(Switzerland) Sandra Keller	All	260	(Australia) Robbie Maddison	1
1	(Australia) MaddWill powered By EBMX	EMBX	90	(Switzerland) Sandra Keller	All	260	(United Kingdom) Dyland Woodcock	2
1	(Australia) MaddWill powered By EBMX	EMBX	90	(Switzerland) Sandra Keller	All	22	(Switzerland) Jonathan Rossé (Note: Swiss enduro rider Jonathan Rossé stood in for Robbie Maddison for rounds 3-5 after Maddison injured his shoulder in practice in round 3)	3–5
2	(Japan) MIE	EMX Powertrain	11	(Spain) Sandra Gomez	1–2,4-5	99	(Spain) Jorge Zaragoza	All
2	(Japan) MIE	EMX Powertrain	?	(Australia) Jess Gardiner (Note: Jess Gardiner substituted for Sandra Gómez in round 3 as Gómez was riding at the Red Bull Romaniacs Hard Enduro Rallye)	3	99	(Spain) Jorge Zaragoza	All
3	(France) Gravity	KTM	?	(France) Elodie Chaplot	1	918	(France) Camille Chapelière	All
3	(France) Gravity	KTM	412	(Slovenia) Tjasa Fifer	2	918	(France) Camille Chapelière	All
3	(France) Gravity	KTM	?	(Italy) Kiara Fontanesi (Note: Six times Womens World Motocross champion Kiara Fontanesi joined gravity in round 3 after Tjasa Fifer left due to commitments elsewhere)	3–5	918	(France) Camille Chapelière	All
4	(United States) Seven-EM Stewart Racing	Electric Motion	?	(United States) Louise Forsley	1	17	(Canada) Spenser Wilton	All
4	(United States) Seven-EM Stewart Racing	Electric Motion	7	(Norway) Vilde Marie Holt	2–3	17	(Canada) Spenser Wilton	All
4	(United States) Seven-EM Stewart Racing	Electric Motion	?	(Norway) Mette Fidje	4–5	17	(Canada) Spenser Wilton	All
5	(France) EM Factory Team	Electric Motion	4	(France) Marine Lemoine	All	47	(France) Christophe Bruand	All
6	(Australia) FLAIR Riders EMX	EMX Powertrain	6	(Australia) Rihanna Buchanan	1-3	2	(Australia) Jack Field	All
6	(Australia) FLAIR Riders EMX	EMX Powertrain	?	(Spain) Gabriela Seisdedos (Note: Rihanna Buchanan injured her knee during practice for round 3 and Gabriela Seisdedos substituted for he in rounds 4-5)	4–5	2	(Australia) Jack Field	All
7	(United Kingdom) PCR-e Performance Sur-Ron Factory Racing	Sur-Ron	9	(United Kingdom) Chloe Richardson	All	3	(United Kingdom) Sam Winterburn	All
8	(Switzerland) Fanatics	Sur-Ron	412	(Slovenia) Tjasa Fifer	1, 4-5	292	(Spain) Álex Gamboa	1
8	(Switzerland) Fanatics	Sur-Ron	24	(Switzerland) Loane Sudan	2	35	(United States) Brett Baldwin	2
8	(Switzerland) Fanatics	Sur-Ron	?	(United Kingdom) Rosie Rowlett	3	?	(United Kingdom) Dylan Woodcock	3–5
9	(Switzerland) Backyard Racing Lizcat Factory Team (Note: Backyard Racing Lizcat did not compete in the opening round in Barcelona)	Lizcat	62	(Switzerland) Michelle Zünd	2-3	32	(Italy) Alex Andreis	2–5
9	(Switzerland) Backyard Racing Lizcat Factory Team	Lizcat	?	(United Kingdom) Nieve Holmes	4–5	32	(Italy) Alex Andreis	2–5

Key
Regular rider
Replacement rider

=== Teams ===
Backyard Racing Lizcat Factory Team

Lizcat are a Swiss company that specialises in converting motocross bikes to electric power. Initially entered as a 'wild card' team in Round 2, Backyard competed in the rest of the season.

EM Factory Team

EM Factory Team is the factory team of electric motorcycle manufacturers Electric Motion.

Fanatics

The team was set up to enable emerging talent to be able to race in the series. The riders for the opening round, Alex Gamboa and Tjasa Fifer, were selected in a contest held on FIM E-Xplorer's Instagram account. Fanatics set up a fan experience at the Barcelona where fans could race against the professional riders participating in the series.

Flair

Flair Action Sports, led by World Freestyle Trials Champion Jack Field, put on freestyle trials shows at Australian motorsport events. Partnered by EMX, Field and his wife Rhianna Buchanan entered the 2023 E-Xplorer World Cup.

Gravity

The team is owned by Kevin Guyard and has Patricio Tarradas Bultó, a member of the Bultaco family, as team manager.

MaddWill powered By EBMX

Led by Australian motorbike stunt rider Robbie Maddison, the team was one of the first to sign-up to the series. As well as being team manager Maddison also rode in the series.

MIE

Set up by Midori Moriwaki in 2018, MIE entered the 2019 World Superbike Championship as a satellite Honda team. In 2023 they also entered the Supersport World Championship and, partnered with EMX Powertrain, they entered the E-Xplorer World Cup.

PCR-e Performance Sur-Ron Factory Racing

British motorcycle tuning company PCR Performance entered the competition as the official Sur-Ron team. Seven-time British Enduro Champion Derrick Edmonson is the team manager.

Seven-EM Stewart Racing

The team, one of the first to sign-up to the series, is led by motocross champion James Stewart. The team's name reflects Stewart's sportswear brand, Seven.

== Venues ==
Barcelona, Spain

The event took place at the Polea Camp, the family home of the Bultaco family. Within the grounds is a permanent motocross facility. The event included dirt track and dual slalom-style races.

Crans-Montana, Switzerland

Located in the Valais Alps, the 600 m (2,000 ft) long course runs along a ridge between Cry d’Er and Bella Lui. It has eight obstacles.

Vollore-Montagne, France

Staged in the mountain forests of the Auvergne region of central France, the course was challenging, narrow and winding with tricky obstacles and large jumps. The trophies for the event were chainsaws painted gold, silver, and bronze.

Capo Teulada, Sardinia

The course in the Italian Army's training grounds is 600 m (2,000 ft) long.

== Results and standings ==
Points system
Position	1	2	3	4	5	6	7	8	9
Points	25	20	16	13	11	10	9	8	7

Position	Team	BAR (Spain)	CRA (Switzerland)	VOL (France)	SAR 1 (Italy)	SAR 2 (Italy)	Points
1	MIE	1	1	3	2	2	106
2	Gravity	8	4	1	1	1	96
3	MaddWill By IXS	6	3	2	3	3	78
4	EM Factory Team	2	5	5	6	6	62
5	SEVEN-EM Stewart Racing	5	2	8	5	5	61
6	PCR-e Performance Factory Sur Ron Team	3	6	6	8	8	52
7	Backyard Racing Lizcat Factory Team		7	7	4	4	44
8	FLAIR Riders EMX	7	8	9	7	7	42
9	Fanatics	4	9	4	9		40
