= Camille Chapelière =

French off-road motorcycle racer

- Born: June 20, 1994 (age 32); Bayeux, Normandy, France
- Nickname: CC918, CamChap
- Teams: Yamaha France, KTM, CC Motorsports, Gravity, Suzuki France

Championship titles
- 2016 French Sand Racing Championship
Statistics
Sand Races World Cup/Championship
Active years	2023-
Championships	0
Team(s)	KTM, Fantic, Suzuki
Best season (2023)	4th (33 pts)
Starts / Wins / Podiums / Points; 12 / 0 / 2 / 82
FIM E-Xplorer World Cup
Active years	2023
Championships	0
Team(s)	Gravity
Last season (2023)	2nd (3 wins/96 pts)
Starts / Wins / Podiums / Points; 5 / 3 / 3 / 96
Dakar Rally
Active years	2021-2023
Starts	3
Wins	0
Team(s)	KTM, Husqvarna
Best season (2022)	19th (2nd in class)
French Sand Racing Championship (CFS)
Active years	2015-
Championships	1 (2016)
Team(s)	Yamaha France, KTM, CC Motorsports, Suzuki France
Best season (2016)	1st (2 wins)
Starts / Wins / Podiums; 45 / 5 / 13

Camille Chapelière, know as CC918 and CamChap, is a French off-road motorcycle racer. He has competed in motocross, sand racing, enduro and rally raid, including the Dakar Rally. He has also competed in the off-road electric motorcycle FIM E-Xplorer World Cup. In 2016, he won the French Sand Racing Championship (CFS).

== Biography ==
Chapelière was born on 20 June 1994 in Bayeux, Normandy, France. He rode his first motorcycle when he was four years old.

=== Racing career ===
Chapelière won the French 85cc Motocross Championship in 2008. He also won the Minivert title after having seven wins in the season. The next year, he moved up to the French 125cc championship. In 2011, he finished fourth in the French Junior MX Championship despite missing three rounds due to a shoulder injury.

In 2012, Chapelière competed in the junior category at the Enduropale du Touquet, where he finished third and won the Pirelli Trophy. The next year, he joined the French Elite Motocross Championship in the MX2 class.

Concentrating on sand racing, Chapelière competed in the French Sand Racing Championship and the open class of the Enduropale in 2014. In 2015, he was in the lead of the French Sand Racing Championship heading into the finale at Le Touquet where he missed a refueling stop and his bike stopped. He had to settle for 2nd place in the championship. During the off-season he was coached by 1997 Enduropale winner David Hauquier in preparation for the 2016 season.

In 2016, Chapelière won at Ronde des Sables Hossegor-Capbreton and GURP TT de Grayan-et-l'Hôpital. A third place at the Enduropale saw him crowned French Sand Racing Champion.

Chapelière joined the factory KTM team in 2017. After KTM withdrew from sand racing in 2020 Chapelière and his father, Eric Chapelière, set up CC Motorsports with the support of KTM dealer Baines Moto. As well as Chapelière, the team ran a number of riders in the junior categories.

In 2018, Chapelière finished 3rd in the Enduropale. He also competed in the Enduro del Verano in Argentina. To prepare for the race he arrived a week early and practiced in the dunes. He finished fourth in the race.

Chapelière won the 2019 Enduro du Mazagan.

Turning to rally raid, Chapelière competed in the 2020 Andalucía Rally, finishing 4th in the Rally2 class. This qualified him to enter the 2021 Dakar Rally where he finished 22nd overall and ninth in his class. He also competed in the 2021 Rallye du Maroc, but was forced to retire. He finished 22nd (ninth in class) in the 2022 Dakar Rally. Chapelière had to retire after the fourth stage of the 2023 Dakar Rally due to a torn left bicep.

In 2023, Chapelière entered the inaugural FIM Sand Races World Cup and finish the series in fourth place. The following year he finished seventh.

Chapelière also entered another inaugural series in 2023, the FIM E-Xplorer World Cup, an off-Road series for electric motorcycles. A team competition with each team consisting of a male and a female rider. Chapelière rode for the Gravity Team, initially partnered by Tjasa Fifer and then by six-time FIM women's motocross world champion Kiara Fontanesi. The Chapelière/Fontanesi partnership won three rounds and the team finished second in the series.

At the end of 2024, Chapelière joined the Suzuki France team.

In 2025, Chapelière had another attempt at the Enduro del Verano. He finished fourth riding a Fantic.

== Results ==
=== FIM Sand Races World Championship results ===
Year	Bike	1	2	3	4	5	6	Points	Position
FIM Sand Races World Cup
2023	KTM	LTO; Ret	EDV; 2	MGS; 4				33	4th
2024	KTM	LTO; Ret		RLP; 7	BSS; Ret	MGS; 7	RHC; 7	47	7th
2024	Gas Gas		EDV; 2					47	7th
FIM Sand Races World Championship
2025	Suzuki	LTO; Ret	EDI; Ret	BSS; 25	HOS	MGS	LTO	1	55th
2026-2027	Suzuki	MSR; 25	BSS	LOO	MGS	LTO		1	25th

=== FIM E-Xplorer World Cup results ===
Year	Team	Female rider	BAR (Spain)	CRA (Switzerland)	VOL (France)	SAR 1 (Italy)	SAR 2 (Italy)	Points	Position
2023	Gravity	Tjasa Fifer	8	4				96	2nd
2023	Gravity	Kiara Fontanesi			1	1	1	96	2nd

=== Rally raid results ===
Year	Event	Bike	Class	Class position	Overall position
2020	Andalucía Rally	KTM 450 Rally	Rally2	4th	28th
2021	Dakar Rally	KTM 450 Rally	Rally2	9th	22nd
2021	Rallye du Maroc	KTM 450 Rally	Rally2	Ret	Ret
2022	Dakar Rally	KTM 450 Rally	Rally2	2nd	19th
2023	Dakar Rally	Husqvarna FR 450 Rally	Rally2	Ret	Ret

=== French Sand Racing Championship results ===
Year	Starts	Wins	Podiums	Points	Position
2015	?	?	?	?	2nd
2016	6	2	5	?	1st
2017	6	1	2	519	9th
2018	6	0	1	455	11th
2019	5	0	1	2270	3rd
2020	Not run (COVID-19)				
2021	4	0	0	1740	13th
2022	1	0	0	340	184th
2023	3	0	0	1210	55th
2024	4	0	0	1495	22nd
2025	4	0	0	1455	17th
Sources					
