= Robert Fabbri =

Robert Fabbri may refer to:

- Robby Fabbri (born 1996), Canadian ice hockey player
- Roberto Fabbri (born 1964), Italian guitarist
