= Rokas Baciuška =

Lithuanian rally driver (born 1999)

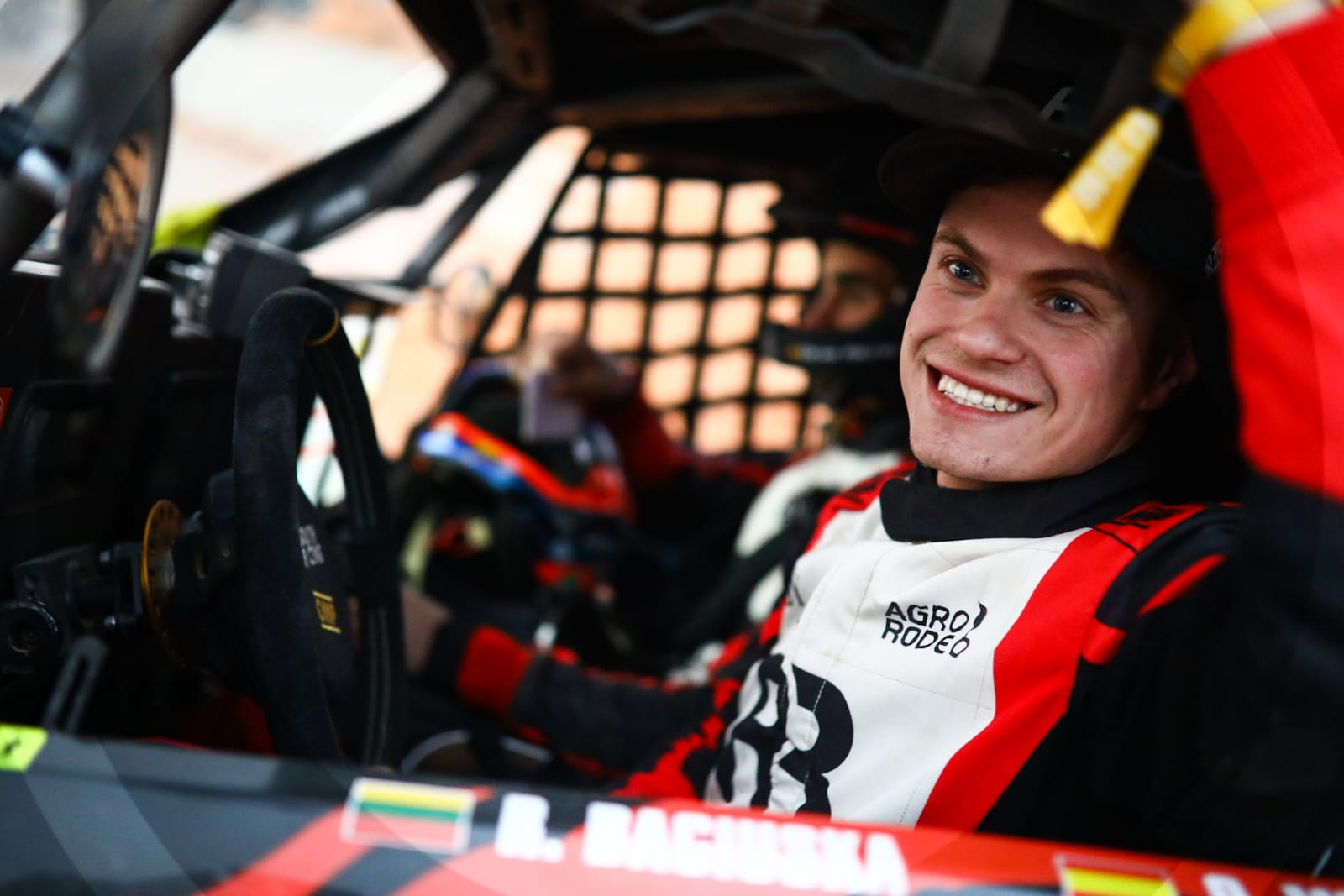

Personal information
- Nationality: (Lithuania) Lithuanian
- Born: 10 December 1999 (age 26) Tauragė, Lithuania
- Height: 171 cm (5 ft 7 in)
- Weight: 69 kg (152 lb; 10 st 12 lb)
- Website: www.rbaciuska.com

Sport
- Sport: Rally raid; Rallycross; Rallying; Kart racing

Rokas Baciuška (pronounced [ɾoːkɐs bɐtsʲʊʃkɐ], born 10 December 1999) is a professional rally driver from Lithuania. He has won the Lithuania Kart racing championship, the European Rallycross Championship in the Super1600 class, and the World Rally-Raid Championship in the T4 SSV class.

== Racing career ==
=== Early career ===
Baciuška started kart racing. at the age of seven. Multiple victories, including the winning of a national title, inspired him to pursue a professional motorsport career. Since then, Baciuška has competed in several motorsport disciplines, including rally, rallycross, and rally raid.

=== Rallycross ===
Baciuška competed in the 2018 FIA European Rallycross Championship season, and won Super1600 class title on his first attempt.

=== Rally raid ===
At the age of 22, Baciuška debuted in 2022 Dakar Rally as the youngest Lithuanian ever to participate in the Dakar rally. He took third place overall in the T4 category, and was nominated as a Best rookie.

The 2022 Dakar Rally was the first round of inaugural 2022 World Rally-Raid Championship. Baciuška completed the season by taking four podiums, winning 2022 Rallye du Maroc, and winning the championship title in T4 category.

Baciuška's results in 2022 gained him a spot in Red Bull Can-Am Team for the 2023 Dakar Rally. He finished second in the 2023 Dakar Rally in the T4 category, winning prologue, three stages and leading at the start of the final day. However, he lost the rally in a cruel manner, losing around twenty minutes due to a broken suspension arm, which needed replacement. The time loss was enough for him to drop down to second place in the general standings.

== Racing record ==
- 2010 Lithuanian Karting Championship: 1st place in Rotax Junior class
- 2012 WSK Euro Series - 60 Mini: 10th place
- 2012 Andrea Margutti Trophy - 60 Junior Trophy: 4th place
- 2014 Andrea Margutti Trophy - KFJ: 9th place
- 2015 Andrea Margutti Trophy - KF: 8th place
- 2015 WSK Champions Cup - KF: 10th place
- 2017 2017 CIK-FIA European KZ2 Championship: 7th place
- 2019 German Kart Championship DSKM: 1st place
- 2019 24° South Garda Winter Cup - KZ2: 6th place
- 2018 FIA European Rallycross Championship: 1st place in Super1600 class
- 2019 FIA World Rallycross Championship: 11th place
- 2021 Rallye du Maroc: 5th place
- 2021 Andalucia Rally: 4th place
- 2021 Baja Aragon: 4th in T4 class category
- 2022 Dakar Rally: 3rd place in T4 class category
- 2022 Abu Dhabi Desert Challenge: 2nd place in T4 class category
- 2022 Rallye du Maroc: 1st place in T4 class category
- 2022 Andalucía Rally: 2nd place in T4 class category
- 2022 W2RC championship: 1st place in T4 class category
- 2023 Dakar Rally: 2nd place in T4 class category
- 2024 Dakar Rally: 3rd place in T3 class category
- 2025 Dakar Rally: 11th place in T1 class category
- 2026 Dakar Rally: 1st place in T2 class category

== Achievements and Nominations ==
- Multiple Lithuanian and Baltic States Karting champion
- Twice nominated as Lithuania best racing driver of the year - 2018 and 2019
- European Super1600 RX champion at first attempt - 2018
- First Lithuanian to participate in World RX Championship - 2019
- Abu Dhabi Desert Challenge: 2nd place - 2022
- Rallye du Maroc: 1st place in T4 category - 2022
- Andalucía Rally: 2nd place - 2022
- Dakar Rally: 3rd place in T4 category - 2022
- Dakar Rally: Best Rookie - 2022
- Dakar Rally: youngest Lithuanian to participate in series (22 years old)
- Dakar Rally: s10 and s12 stage winner - 2022
- Dakar Rally: 2nd place in T4 category - 2023
- Dakar Rally: Prologue, s5, s7 and s11 stage winner - 2023
- Dakar Rally: 3rd place in T3 category - 2024
- Dakar Rally: s2 stage winner - 2025
- Dakar Rally: 1st place in T2 category - 2026
- Dakar Rally: s1, s5, s8, s9, s10, s11 and s13 stage winner - 2026

== Racing record ==
=== Dakar Rally results ===
| Year | Class | Starting number | Navigator | Vehicle | Stages won | Position |
|---|---|---|---|---|---|---|
| 2022 | SxS (SSV) | 414 | (Spain) Oriol Mena Valdearcos | (Canada) Can-Am Maverick XRS | 2 | 3 |
| 2023 | SxS (SSV) | 400 | (Spain) Oriol Vidal Montijano | (Canada) Can-Am Maverick XRS | 3 | 2 |
| 2024 | Challenger | 300 | (Spain) Oriol Vidal Montijano | (Canada) Can-Am Maverick XRS Turbo | | 3 |
| 2025 | Car | 210 | (Spain) Oriol Mena Valdearcos | (Japan) Toyota Hilux Gazoo Racing DKR IMT EVO | 1 | 11 |
| 2026 | Car (T2, Stock) | 502 | (Spain) Oriol Vidal Montijano | (United Kingdom) Land Rover Defender Dakar D7X-R | 7 | 1 |

=== Complete World Rally-Raid Championship results ===
(key)

| Year | Team | Car | Class | 1 | 2 | 3 | 4 | 5 | Pos. | Points |
|---|---|---|---|---|---|---|---|---|---|---|
| 2022 | South Racing Can-Am | BRP Can-Am Maverick XRS | T4 | DAK; 2 | ABU; 2 | MOR; 1 | AND; 2 | | 1st | 176 |
| 2023 | Red Bull Can-Am Factory Team | BRP Can-Am Maverick XRS | T4 | DAK; 2 | ABU; 1 | SON; 1 | DES | MOR | 1st | 189 |
| 2024 | Can-Am Factory Team | Can-Am Maverick XRS Turbo | Challenger | DAK; 3^{68} | ABU; 2^{46} | PRT; 1^{46} | DES; 1^{49} | MOR; Ret | 1st | 209 |
| 2025 | Overdrive Racing | Toyota Hilux Overdrive | T1+ | DAK; 12^{16} | ABU; WD | ZAF | PRT | MOR | 25th | 16 |

* Season still in progress
