= Electric Motion =

French electric off-road motorcycle manufacturer

Electric Motion SAS
- Type: Private (Société par actions simplifiée)
- Founded: 2009 in Saint-Brès, Hérault, France
- Founder: Philippe Arnaud
- Headquarters: Saint-Brès, Hérault, France
- Area served: Worldwide (≈ 40 countries)
- Key people: Philippe Arnaud (Founder and CEO)
- Products: Electric Motorcycles
- Owner: Privately held; minority investment by Yamaha Motor Company (2024)
- Number of employees: (~20 (reported 2024))
- Parent: None
- Website: https://em-motorcycles.com/

Electric Motion SAS (trading as EM) is a French manufacturer of electric off-road and trials motorcycles. Founded in 2009, the company is headquartered in Saint-Brès, France, and has established itself as one of the leading European producers of lightweight electric competition motorcycles for both competition and recreational use.

According to filings with the French business registry, Electric Motion SAS reported revenue of approximately €8.56 million for the financial year ending June 30, 2022, and €7.74 million for the year ended June 30, 2024. Electric Motion does not publicly disclose annual production volumes or unit sales figures.

== Company history ==
=== Startup phase (2009-2013) ===
Electric Motion was founded by Philippe Arnaud in 2009 with the goal of producing fully electric trials motorcycles. Early models, such as the EM 5.7, established the company’s reputation for quiet operation and instant torque delivery, appealing to trial riders and environmentally conscious competitors alike. Operations began in the Hérault department of southern France, first at Saint-Bauzille-de-Montmel, before moving its workshops to Castries and later to Vendargues as production capacity grew. The main site was subsequently relocated to Saint-Brès in 2023.

A pre-series of the company’s first trials model was built and tested around Castries during this period, ahead of wider release. The EM 5.7, shown and iterated in 2011-2012 after roughly three years of R&D, is often cited as one of the first viable electric trials bikes designed for both competition and leisure use.

By 2013, Electric Motion had successfully expanded into the enduro-style and competition-based electric motorcycle market, exporting to more than 40 countries. The EM 5.7 was appearing at French national trials events and public demo days, marking the brand’s first competitive outings. The company's bikes went on to compete in the FIM E-Xplorer World Cup and other electric off-road championships.

=== Yamaha investment (2024) ===
On 7 November 2024, Yamaha Motor Co., Ltd. announced that it had made a strategic investment in Electric Motion SAS to strengthen both companies’ positions in the global electric motorcycle market and to pursue joint technological development in electric mobility. The investment forms part of Yamaha’s long-term sustainability strategy outlined in its Environmental Plan 2050, which aims for carbon neutrality across all business activities and supply chains by 2050.

At the time of the announcement, Electric Motion was headquartered in Saint-Brès, France (ZAC de Cantaussel, 86 Impasse de la Pépinière, 34670 Saint-Brès) and employed about 20 people. The company’s electric trials and off-road motorcycles were sold in roughly 40 countries, including Japan, with around 85 percent of sales made outside France. Electric Motion had also reported five consecutive years of profitability.

Following the investment, Yamaha and Electric Motion jointly developed the Yamaha YE‑01 Racing Concept, an electric motocross prototype jointly developed by both companies and revealed at the 2025 EICMA show in Milan. The concept combines Yamaha’s electric powertrain development with Electric Motion’s expertise in electric trials motorcycle technology. The concept features a liquid-cooled motor, hydraulic clutch, and KYB adjustable suspension within a chassis derived from the YZ450F motocross platform. Yamaha described the YE-01 as capable of delivering “MXGP-level performance” and indicated it was designed to meet regulations for upcoming MXEP electric motocross competition rounds in Europe.

== Models ==
Model	Production	Type	Motor power (peak)	Battery capacity	Notable features
EM 5.7	2012-2016	Trials	11 kW	1.9 kWh	First production model; quiet operation and high torque
Escape	2018-present	Trail / Enduro	11 kW	2.6 kWh	Extended range, larger seat, longer suspension
ePure	2019-present	Trials	11 kW	1.9 kWh	Core model, standard trials geometry
ePure Race	2020-present	Trials	11 kW	1.9 kWh	Hydraulic clutch, regenerative braking, Tick-Over mode
ePure Comp	2021-present	Competition Trials	11 kW	1.9 kWh	Lightweight components, tuned for competition
Yamaha YE-01 Racing Concept	2025	Concept Motocross	-	-	Joint development with Yamaha; unveiled at EICMA 2025

== Motorsport and competition ==
Electric Motion motorcycles have been used in national and international electric off-road events since the early 2010s. The table below summarises the company’s principal racing activities and results.

Year	Event / Series	Class or Category	Team / Rider(s)	Result / Notes
2012-2014	French Trials Championship (demonstration events)	Trials exhibition	Various riders	Early public demonstrations of the EM 5.7 in national events
2019-2022	FIM Trial E Cup / TrialGP Electric Class	Electric trials	Factory team and private entrants	Regular podium finishes; competition platform for ePure development
2023	FIM E-Xplorer World Cup	Mixed-team off-road (electric)	Gaël Chatagno / EM Factory Team	Multiple race wins and podiums in the inaugural season
2024	FIM E-Xplorer World Cup	Mixed-team off-road (electric)	Gaël Chatagno / EM Factory Team	Continued participation; software and clutch calibration updates tested in competition
2025	Yamaha YE-01 development testing	Motocross prototype	Joint Yamaha-Electric Motion R&D	Collaborative testing ahead of public reveal at EICMA 2025
2026 (planned)	MXEP - Motocross Electric Project	Electric motocross	TBD	Series under development by MXGP Promoters; EM models used in early evaluation

== Technology ==
Electric Motion designs its motorcycles around lightweight steel or aluminium perimeter frames and compact lithium-ion battery systems developed for off-road performance. The electric powertrains utilise permanent-magnet synchronous motors coupled with single-speed transmissions to deliver immediate torque and minimise mechanical complexity.

The battery capacity in current models, such as the ePure and ePure Race, is approximately 1.9 kWh at 50 V, offering rapid charge capability and high power density suitable for short-duration trial events.

A key technical distinction of Electric Motion’s designs is the integration of a hydraulic diaphragm clutch, which allows modulation of torque output through mechanical slip rather than purely electronic control. This feature enables traditional trials techniques such as clutch feathering, hopping, and pivot turns, which are difficult to reproduce on most electric motorcycles.

The company’s Progressive Regenerative Brake (PRB) system employs an electronic braking circuit that converts kinetic energy back into stored electrical energy during deceleration. The PRB lever is mounted in the clutch position and simultaneously functions as a variable regenerative brake, allowing precise modulation of braking force while extending battery range.

Later models introduced a “Tick-Over” mode, maintaining a constant low-speed motor rotation when stationary to simulate the idle characteristics of an internal-combustion engine, improving throttle response at low speed. An anti-reverse system electronically prevents backward wheel rotation on steep gradients by applying counter-torque through the motor controller.

These technologies reflect Electric Motion’s design approach of applying electric propulsion to the established handling and control requirements of trials motorcycles.

== See also ==
- Yamaha YE‑01 Racing Concept
- Yamaha Motor Company
- Electric motorcycle
