= Yamaha YE01 =

Electric motocross concept motorcycle by Yamaha Motor

Yamaha YE-01 Racing Concept
- Manufacturer: Yamaha Motor Company
- Production: Concept model only (2025)
- Class: Electric motocross / concept
- Engine: Liquid-cooled electric powertrain
- Transmission: Hydraulic clutch (concept)
- Frame type: Lightweight motocross-style chassis (concept)
- Suspension: Fully adjustable front and rear
- Related: Yamaha YZ450F

The Yamaha YE-01 Racing Concept is an electric motocross prototype developed by Yamaha Motor Company in cooperation with French manufacturer Electric Motion SAS. It was unveiled at the 2025 EICMA show in Milan as part of Yamaha’s strategy to enter future electric motocross competition categories.

== Overview ==
Yamaha introduced the YE-01 as its vision for next-generation electric off-road motorcycles. The model was designed to demonstrate the company’s electric drivetrain development, lightweight chassis engineering, and racing-grade handling within a zero-emission platform. The prototype aligns with Yamaha’s Environmental Plan 2050, which outlines carbon-neutral mobility initiatives across all product categories.

== Design and technology ==
The YE-01 uses a compact liquid-cooled electric power unit positioned within a purpose-built aluminum motocross frame. It features a hydraulically actuated clutch, a feature rarely seen on electric motorcycles, allowing riders to modulate traction and engine braking similarly to combustion-powered race machines.

Yamaha states that the layout centralises mass to achieve balance comparable to its competition four-stroke models such as the Yamaha YZ450F. The concept also uses fully adjustable suspension components and lightweight composite bodywork to replicate the ergonomics and agility of a professional motocross racer.

== Development and future ==
The YE-01 Racing Concept is intended as a test platform for electric motocross racing technology and a preview of Yamaha’s potential participation in the FIM’s upcoming electric motocross category (MXEP). Yamaha engineers indicated that data from this concept will inform future production and racing efforts scheduled for evaluation in 2026.

== See also ==
- Electric motocross
- Yamaha YZ450F
- Electric Motion
- Yamaha Motor Company
