= FIM E-Bike Cross World Cup =

- Category: Motorcycle racing
- Region: International
- Inaugural season: 2019
- Official website: FIM E-Bike Cross World Cup website

The FIM E-Bike Cross World Cup is the premier competition organized by FIM on the sport of e-bike racing. The competition started in 2019 in the middle of disputes between FIM and UCI over which governing body would govern the e-bike sports.

== Men medallists ==
=== EX1 ===
Event	Gold	Silver	Bronze
2019	Anze Svetek; Slovenia	Mark Scheu; Germany	Gianni Meschini; Italy
2020	Roberto Fabbri; Italy	Andrea Pignotti; Italy	Adrien Fretigne; France
2021	Andrea Pignotti; Italy	Roberto Fabbri; Italy	Tomasso Bianchetti; Italy
2022	Stefano Bonacina; Italy	Andrea Pignotti; Italy	Roberto Fabbri; Italy

=== EX2 ===
Event	Gold	Silver	Bronze
2019	Roberto Fabbri; Italy	Davide Guarneri; Italy	Mattia Folchi; Italy
2020	Cristian Comastri; Italy	Manuel Iacopi; Italy	Giuliano Boschi; Italy
2021	Gianni Meschini; Italy	Gaylord Soldevila; France	Andrea Sassoli; Italy
2022	Sascha Sodies; Germany	Tom Pajic; France	Andrea Sassoli; Italy

=== EX3 ===
Event	Gold	Silver	Bronze
2020	Gaylord Soldevila; France	Riccardo Boschi; Italy	Mitja Sorn; Slovenia
2021	Andrea Di Luca; Italy	Giuliano Boschi; Italy	Mitja Sorn; Slovenia
2022	Andrea Di Luca; Italy	Davide Rossin; Italy	not awarded

== Women medallists ==
=== EX1 ===
Event	Gold	Silver	Bronze
2019	Caroline Duchene; France	not awarded	not awarded

=== EX2 ===
Event	Gold	Silver	Bronze
2019	Nikolette Makk; Hungary	not awarded	not awarded
2021	Matilde Andrea Melani; Italy	not awarded	not awarded
