= FIM E-Xplorer World Cup =

Global all-electric off-road motorcycle racing series

The FIM E-Xplorer World Cup was an international electric all-terrain motorcycle racing series organised by the Fédération Internationale de Motocyclisme (FIM). It features teams of two riders, one male and one female, competing on electric off-road motorcycles across multiple rounds worldwide.

== Overview ==
Launched in 2023, the E-Xplorer World Cup marks one of the first global championships for electric motocross and off-road motorcycles. The series comprises teams of two riders (one male and one female) and includes multiple classes such as Hyperbike (prototype machines) and GT (production-based machines).

== Format and classes ==
The championship weekends typically consist of practice sessions, short qualifying races, sprint races and relay or head-to-head formats across the classes. For example, in the Hyperbike class, machines are unrestricted prototype machines (approx. 7 kWh battery) while the GT class restricts bikes to lighter weights (<112 kg) and production-based components.

== Significance ==
The E-Xplorer World Cup serves as a platform for motorcycle manufacturers to develop and showcase electric off-road technology, supporting the motorsport community's transition to sustainable energy sources. Notably, works entries from major manufacturers such as Honda Racing Corporation (HRC) have confirmed participation to accelerate the development of prototype machines.

== History ==
The FIM announced the launch of the series in July 2021 with the series expected to start in 2022. In December 2021 E-Xplorer SA were appointed by the FIM to be the series promotors and commercial rights-holders. The series was aimed at becoming a 'global laboratory for two-wheeled electric technology and mobility' To 'encourage diversity and equality in motorsport', E-Xplorer SA committed to ensure both genders were represented in both the operational and sporting sides. Ten teams, each of a male and a female rider were to contest the series.

The start of the series was pushed back to the third quarter of 2022 with 3 events planned. The first two teams, Seven Racing Team and Maddwill Racing, signed up to the series in May 2022. The series was further pushed back to 2023 with the FIM announcing the provisional calendar in November 2022. Running from May to November 6 events were included.

A revised calendar was issued and rounds were held in Catalonia, Spain, Crans-Montana in the Swiss Alps, the French region of Auvergne and a double header in the sand dunes of Sardinia. The Sardinia rounds were held in conjunction with the Extreme E series. Team MIE (Sandra Gomez and Jorge Zaragoza) won the series.

For 2024 the Sporting Regulations were changed to allow longer races to push the power units further. A new category for prototypes was added. A provisional 2024 calendar was announced in October 2023 with five events, including 3 double-headers, in Japan, Norway, France, Switzerland and India. The French round was subsequently dropped. Once the season had started the Indian round was cancelled due to 'unforeseen logistical challenges', the two rounds in Switzerland becoming the season finale.

== Seasons ==
=== 2023 ===
The inaugural season consisted of five rounds:

| Round | Date | Location |
|---|---|---|
| 1 | 13 May | Barcelona, Spain |
| 2 | 24 June | Crans-Montana, Switzerland |
| 3 | 29 July | Vollore-Montagne, France |
| 4 | 16 September | (Italy) Capo Teulada, Sardinia |
| 5 | 17 September | (Italy) Capo Teulada, Sardinia |

MIE were the winning team.

== See also ==
- FIM E-Bike Cross World Cup
