= Guillaume Borne =

French footballer (born 1988)

Personal information
- Date of birth: 12 February 1988 (age 38)
- Place of birth: Castres, France
- Height: 1.83 m (6 ft 0 in)
- Position: Right-back

Youth career
- Rennes

Senior career*
Years	Team	Apps	(Gls)
2006–2009	Rennes	14	(0)
2008–2009	→ Brest (loan)	8	(1)
2009–2011	Boulogne	24	(0)
2011–2012	AS Beauvais	25	(0)
2012–2015	AS Vitré	30	(2)
- * Club domestic league appearances and goals

Guillaume Borne (French pronunciation: [ɡijom bɔʁn]; born 12 February 1988) is a retired French footballer who played as a right-back.
