= Sur-Ron =

Chinese electric motorcycle company

- Industry: Motorcycle manufacturing
- Founded: December 2014
- Headquarters: Chongqing, China
- Key people: Zhuo Liu (CEO)
- Products: Electric motorcycles
- Website: surron.com

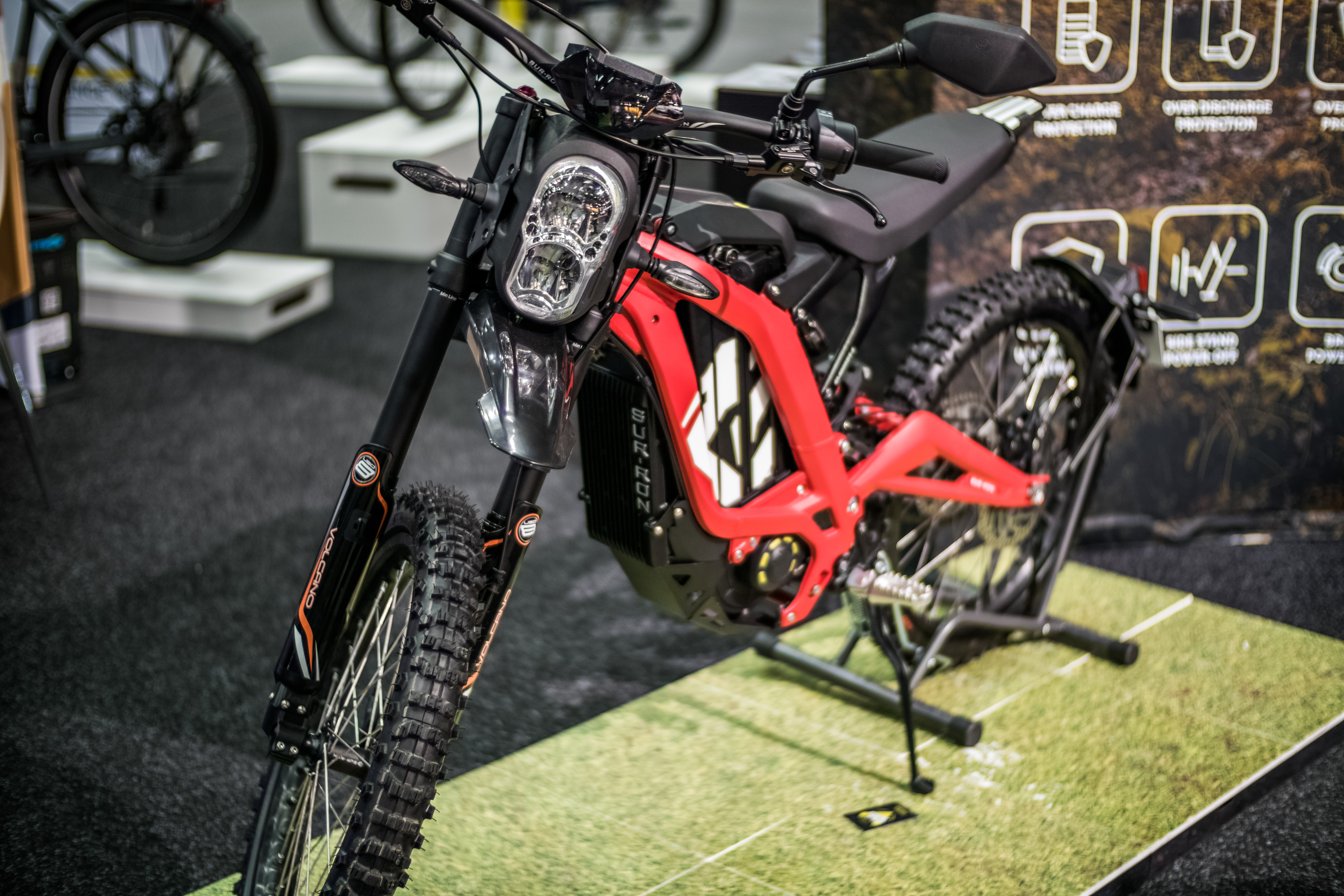
A Sur-Ron electric dirt bike

Sur-Ron (/ˈsɔːrˌ(r)ɒn, -ˈsɜːr/), also known as Chongqing Qiulong Technology Co. Ltd., is a Chinese company that designs, develops and manufactures electric dirt bikes. The company has produced 5 models, the Hyper Bee, the Light Bee S, the Light Bee X, Ultra Bee, and their most powerful model, the Storm Bee. The production and sale of the youth model, the Light Bee S, has been discontinued in 2025. Production was discontinued in favor of the new youth model, the Hyper Bee. The Light Bee X, Storm Bee, and Ultra Bee all have EU road legal models, however as of 2025 they are not NHTSA certified for road use within the United States.

== Company ==
In 2014, three motorcycle enthusiasts in China started the company. In March 2018 they launched their first model, the Light Bee, a light-weight electric dirt bike.

By August 2022, the company had more than 100 employees, and 50% of the manufacturing process was performed by robots.

== Models ==
Model	Launched	Road legal?	Battery	Peak power	Top speed	Ref
Hyper Bee	2025	No	2025: 52V 22 A⋅h; 2026: 58V 22 A⋅h	2025: 5 kW (6.7 hp); 2026: 8 kW (11 hp)	40 mph (64 km/h)	
Light Bee S	2018 (discontinued)	No	48V 20 A⋅h or 50.4v 26ah	3.5 kW (4.7 hp)	31 mph (50 km/h)	
Light Bee X	2018	2025–2026: No pre-2025: Yes	2026: 72V 35 A⋅h pre-2026: 60V 40 A⋅h	2026: 10 kW (13 hp); 2025: 8 kW (11 hp) pre-2025: 6 kW (8.0 hp)	46 mph (74 km/h)	
Light Bee L1E	2018	Yes	2026: 72V 35 A⋅h pre-2026: 60V 40 A⋅h	6 kW (8.0 hp)	46 mph (74 km/h)	
Ultra Bee	2022	Yes (in street legal homologation and some states only)	74V 60 A⋅h	2026: 24.5kW (32hp) 2025: 21 kW (28 hp) pre-2025 T NA: 12.5 kW (16.8 hp)	59 mph (95 km/h)	
Storm Bee	2022	Yes (in street legal homologation only)	104V 55 A⋅h	22.5 kW (30.2 hp)	68 mph (109 km/h)	

== Police use ==
In 2026 the Metropolitan Police operated 25 of the bikes.
