= Iveco PowerStar =

Australian tractor unit

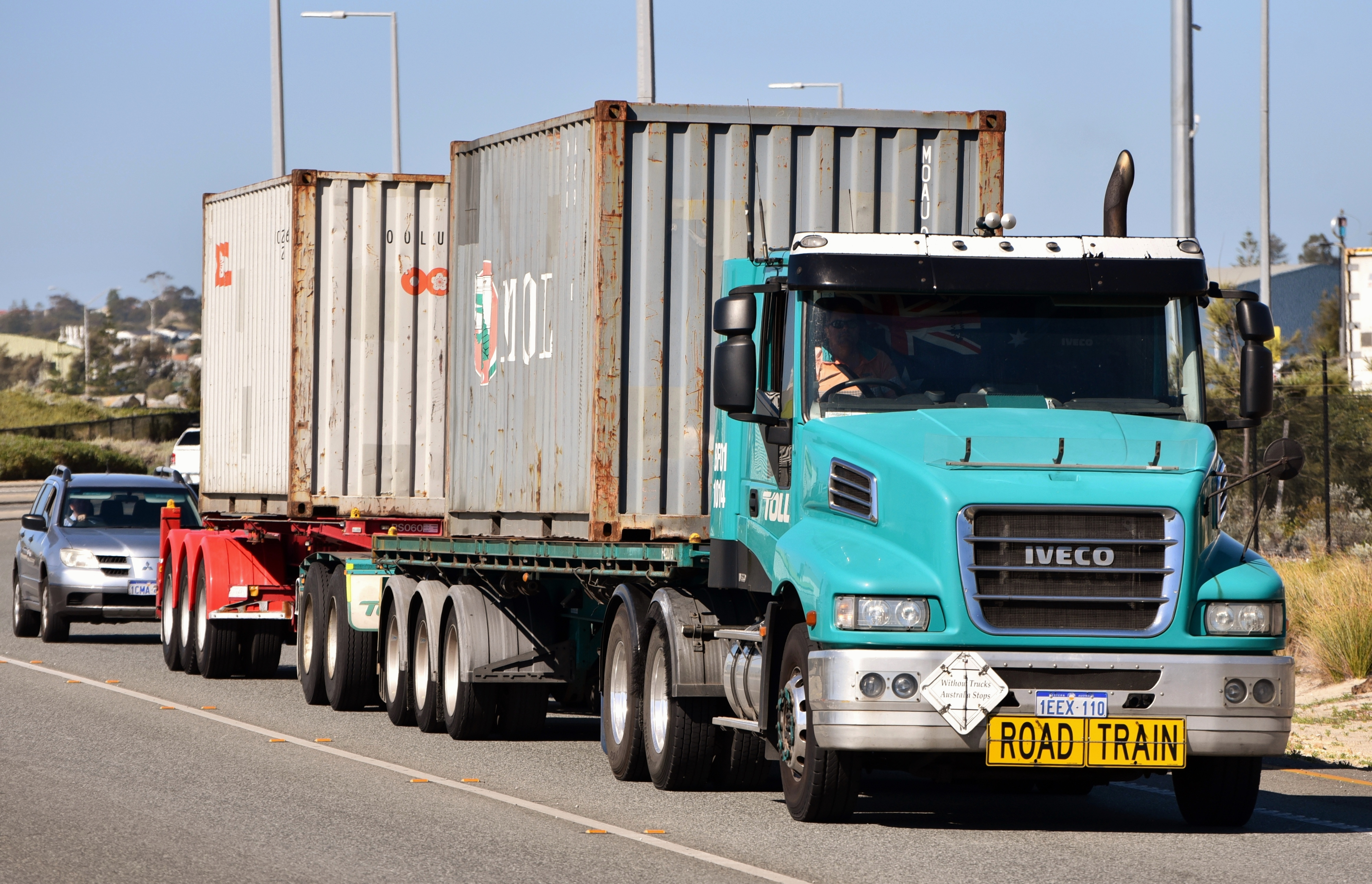
Iveco PowerStar

The Iveco PowerStar is an Australian developed and built tractor unit, assembled in Dandenong, Victoria. It is based on the European cab-over engine models, but with a bonnet, it was available as both a day cab, as well as a sleeper cab. When first released in 1998, it was available with Iveco engines, and also American engines, including the Detroit Diesel Series 60, Cummins ISM, ISX and Signature and Caterpillar C12 and C15. A selection of transmissions was also available, such as Iveco's ZF "Eurotronic", Eaton's RoadRanger and Eaton's automated manual the Autoshift. Rear diffs were usually Meritor units, drive shafts were usually Spicer 1810 series on the main shaft and 1710 series on the jack shaft between the two diffs. Rear suspension was either Hendrickson HAS461 or NeWay. Electrical system was a 24 volt system.

The Iveco PowerStar could be rated for single trailer use all the way to multi-trailer road train applications.

Initially, the first generation PowerStar was very popular with operators who had traditionally only brought North American sourced prime movers, due to the fact the PowerStar could be sourced with the same driveline as their North American Prime Movers, but with the comfort of a European cab. The PowerStar was very well priced also.

The second generation PowerStar, based on the newer European Stralis cab-over-engine design, was initially not available with the North American driveline, but the Iveco Cursor engine and EuroTronic II Transmission only. Because of this the second generation PowerStar was not as popular as the first generation with the American driveline.

However, from 2010 the Cummins ISX engine was again made available with coupled to the EuroTronic II 16 speed transmission, alongside the Iveco Cursor engine in the model line up.

== Iveco Strator ==
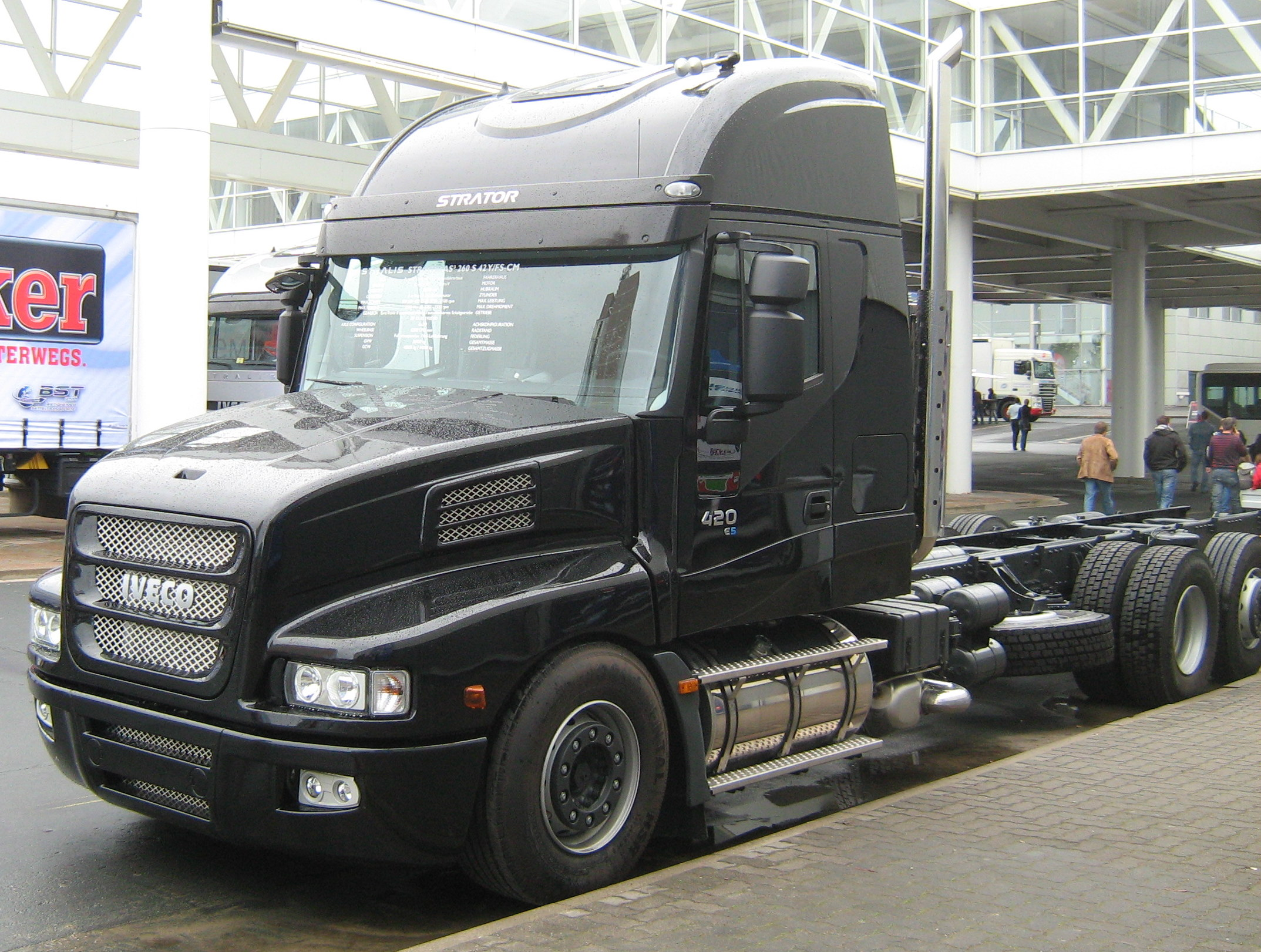
Iveco Strator

A European version of the PowerStar is built in the Netherlands. These trucks are rebuilt Iveco Stralis, designed to meet European safety rules. There are some small exterior differences between the Strator and the PowerStar. It is the only Iveco heavy-duty truck with a bonnet currently sold in Europe.

== Motorsport ==
Dutch driver Gerard de Rooy won the 2012 and 2016 Dakar Rally using modified Iveco PowerStar trucks. As did the Dutch Janus van Kasteren in 2023. Czech driver Martin Macík won the 2024 and 2025 editions. While Lithuanian driver Vaidotas Žala won in 2026 using a redesigned Iveco PowerStar chassis
