= Annie Seel =

Swedish motorcycle racer

- Born: Annie Maria Catharina Seel; 5 September 1968 (age 58); Täby, Sweden
- Occupations: public speaker and marketing consultant
- Known for: Enduro racer, rally driver and for climbing Everest on a motorcycle

Annie Maria Catharina Seel (born 5 September 1968) is a Swedish-born motorcyclist who set a world altitude record for climbing to Mount Everest base camp on a motorcycle in 2003. Seel climbed to 5,305 m (17,405 ft), breaking the existing unofficial record by more than 50 m (160 ft), using a 20-year-old Honda XL250 fitted with ice tires. This limitation was due to the Nepalese government's ban on the importation of new motorcycles to Nepal. This record has now been broken by another female rider, Tamsin Jones, who with her partner, Craig Bounds, climbed to 5359m in 2011.

Previously known as an enduro racer and a leading female competitor in the Paris-Dakar Rally, Seel was awarded the Swedish "Adventurer of The Year" award in 2005 for being the first woman to compete in the 500-mile (800 km) TSCO Vegas to Reno desert motorcycle race, where she finished as the fifth highest amateur and was FIM first "Ride Green" woman eco-enduro champion in a race for electric motorcycles supporting environmentally responsible motorsports racing.

During the 2010 Dakar Rally, Seel crashed into a 16 ft (4.9 m) deep tomb but continued to complete the race. She also competed in the world's first electric grand prix "TTXGP 2010" at Snetterton Motor Racing Circuit in the UK, riding the Morris Motorcycles Racing team's Mavizen TTX02 machine.
