= Roberto Fabbri =

Italian composer

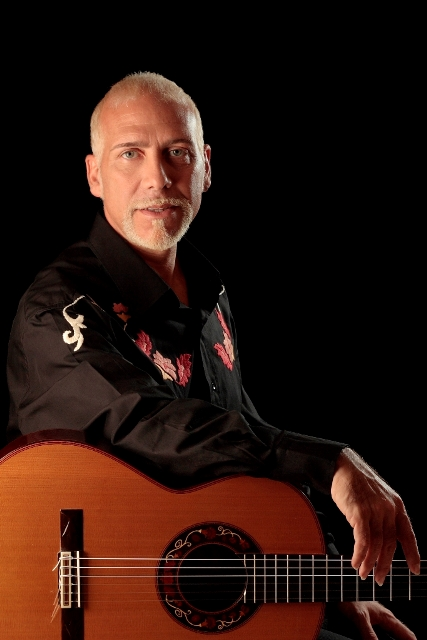

Roberto Fabbri (born 1964, Rome) is an Italian classical guitarist, composer, teacher and writer.

== Biography ==
He studied classical guitar under the guidance of Carlo Carfagna at the Conservatory "Santa Cecilia" in Rome, where he graduated with full honors in 1986. He obtained a bachelor in music with 110 and praise with an essay on Mauro Giuliani's Rossiniane.

He is the headmaster and teacher of classical guitar at the Academy "Novamusica e Arte" in Rome and also teaches classical guitar at the Institute of High Artistic and Musical Formation "Giulio Briccialdi" in Terni.

== Musical career ==
He has developed his musical career as a soloist and with the guitar quartet Nexus. He has been the artistic director of Festival Internazionale della Chitarra Città di Fiuggi since 2006. He plays the Ramirez 125° Anniversary 2007 n°1 guitar and uses La Bella strings.

== Publications ==
Roberto Fabbri has carried out an intense didactic and editorial activity, cooperating with different publishing houses (Anthropos, Berben, Playgame, EMR, Warner Bros., Carisch). His most popular book Suoniamo la Chitarra has been translated into French, Spanish, and German, and now a Chinese translation is coming up.

He contributes monthly to the Italian magazine Chitarre, as the editor of the classical section of the magazine.

=== Books ===
- "Suonare Eddie Van Halen" Anthropos 1986
- "Suonare Pat Metheny" Anthropos 1986
- "Antologia di brani famosi" with cd, Playgame
- "Metodo per chitarra classica" with cd, Berbén 1998
- "J. S. Bach" with cd, Playgame 1999
- "The greatest romantic themes" with cd, Playgame 2000
- "Suoniamo la chitarra", Carisch 2000
- "Le scale per chitarra" Warner Bros. 2001
- Revisione metodo Ferdinando Carulli op. 27, Carisch 2002
- "Divertiamoci con la chitarra" anthology, Carisch 2002
- "Mario Gangi. Dal classico al... jazz" with cd, Carisch 2002
- "Chitarra" first anthology with cd, Carisch 2003
- "Chitarrista classico autodidatta" with cd, Carisch 2003
- "Suoniamo la chitarra... a colori" Carisch 2003
- "Grande dizionario dei chitarristi" Editori Riuniti (Roma 2003)
- "Facciamo le scale" Carisch 2003
- "Guitar Meet Movies" with cd, Carisch 2004
- "Chitarra" second anthology, Carisch 2004
- "Suoniamo la chitarra" second volume, Carisch 2004
- "Guitar Master" Carisch 2006
- "Chitarra terza antologia" with cd, Carisch 2006
- "Fra classico e..." with cd, Carisch 2006
- Carlo Carfagna/Roberto Fabbri/Michele Greci "La storia della chitarra" Carisch 2007
- "Giovanni Allevi for guitar" arrangiamenti per chitarra a cura di Roberto Fabbri, Carisch 2008
- "Suoniamo la Chitarra a Natale" con cd, Carisch 2009
- "Beyond", Carisch 2010
- "No Words", Carisch 2011

=== Music ensemble anthologies ===
- "The Pink panther", Carisch (Milano, 2003)
- "Summertime", Carisch (Milano, 2003)
- "When the saints go marching in", Carisch (Milano, 2003)

=== Video ===
- "Lezioni di chitarra classica", Playgame (Cagliari, 1987)

=== Cd in solo ===
- "Metodo per chitarra classica", Bèrben (Ancona 1989)
- "Antologia di brani famosi" Playgame (Cagliari, 1998)
- "J.S.Bach" Playgame (Cagliari, 1999)
- "The Greatest Romantic Themes", Playgame (Cagliari, 2000)
- "Mario Gangi fra classico e...jazz", Carisch (Milano, 2002)
- "Chitarra antologia vol. 1", Carisch (Milano, 2003)
- "Chitarrista classico autodidatta" con cd, Carisch (Milano, 2003)
- "Guitar Meets Movies", Carisch (Milano, 2004)
- "Beyond", EGEA Music (2010)
- "No Words", EGEA Music (2011)
- "Nei tuoi occhi", Sony Classical (2012)

=== Cd with guitar quartet Nexus ===
- "Dal classico al...jazz", Playgame (Cagliari, 2001)
- "Concerto Andaluso" di Joaquin Rodrigo, Nexus guitar quartet and Orchestra Sinfonica Provinciale di Bari directed by Leo Brouwer (Sapere 2000 edizioni multimediali, Roma 2004)
- "Travel" Margie Group 2007
