= Amine Echiguer =

World champion motorcycle rider

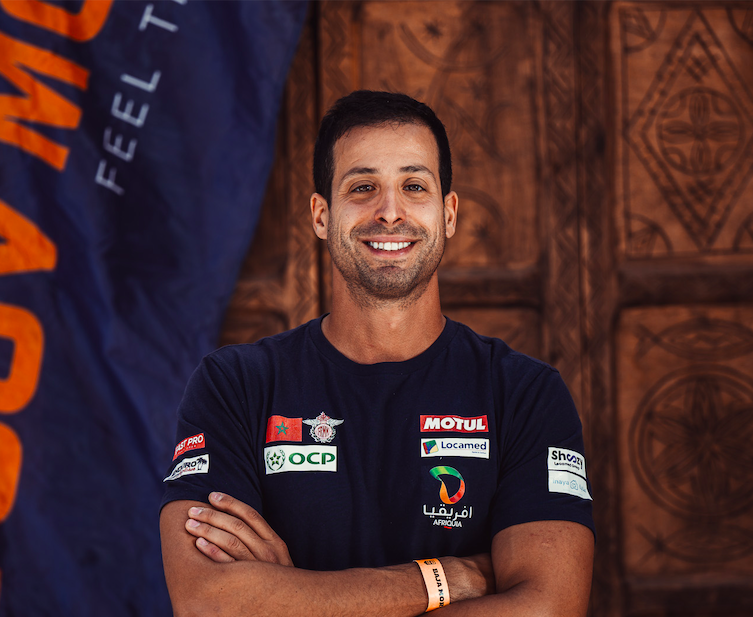
Amine Echiguer with Maroc ART Team.

Amine Echiguer (born May 10, 1988 in Rabat) is a Moroccan rally raid racer.

In 2022, Echiguer win the World Rally Raid Championship in the Rally3 category He is also the first Moroccan to win a motorcycle world title
