= Carlo Carfagna =

Italian classical guitarist

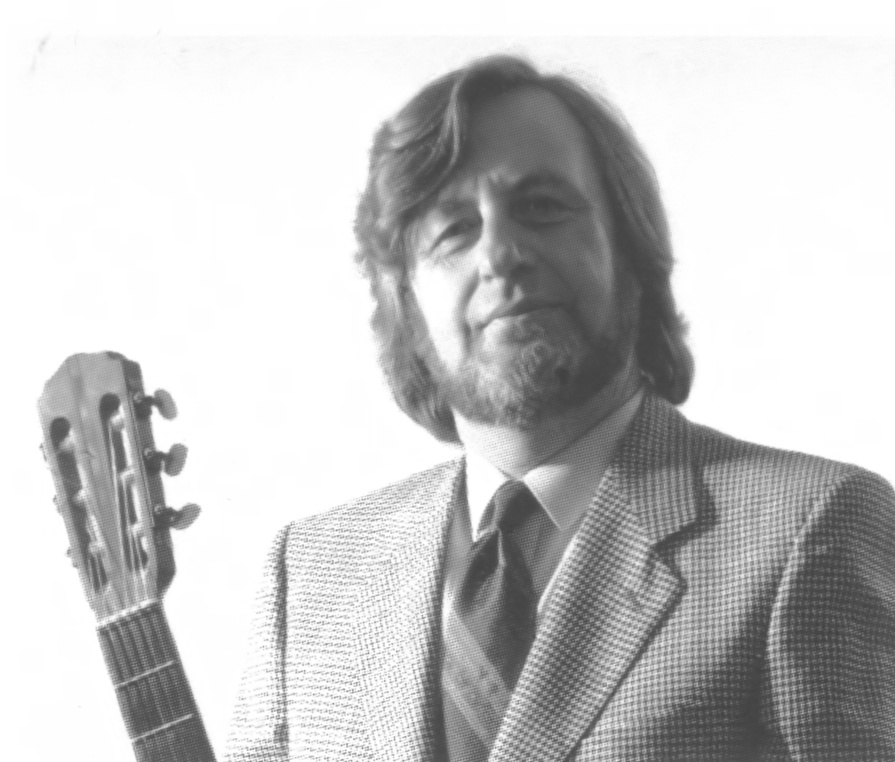

Background information
- Born: 1940 (age 85–86); Guarcino, Italy
- Died: September 9, 2026 (aged 85–86)
- Genres: Classical music
- Instrument: Guitar
- Years active: 1960–present
- Website: www.carlocarfagna.it

Carlo Carfagna (born 1940 in Guarcino, Italy) was an Italian classical guitarist, author of many musical publications. His musical education took place at the Conservatory of Rome and Naples, under the guidance of Mario Gangi, and was subsequently a teaching colleague for many years at Santa Cecilia.

== Publications ==
=== Transcriptions and revisions ===
Main works

- Integral edition in three volumes of Fernando Sor's Studies for guitar.
- Integral edition in three volumes of Francisco Tárrega's works.
- Revision of the four Lute Suites by Johann Sebastian Bach.
- Revision of the four sonatas by Sor

He published with the following firms: Bèrben (Ancona), Ricordi (Milan), Music Inc. (Dallas), Nicolai (Rome), Domani Musica (Rome), Erom (Rome).

=== Essays ===
- Profilo storico della chitarra, (with Alberto Caprani), Bèrben, Ancona, 1966
- Dizionario Chitarristico Italiano (with Mario Gangi), Bèrben, Ancona, 1968
- Liuteria Classica Italiana, chitarre del XIX e XX secolo (with Giovanni Antonioni), Camerata Musicale Barese, 1985
- Chitarra - Storia e Immagini (with Michele Greci), Fratelli Palombi Editori, Roma, 2000
- Il libretto per musica e Metastasio, Erom, Rome, 2005
- Aspetti della Chitarra nell'Ottocento, Erom, Rome, 2006
- He has written together with Mario Gangi the article Guitar in the Musical Encyclopedia edited by Fratelli Fabbri Editori
- He has written many essays on guitar-specific newspapers (even small treatises on History of art)
- He has cowritten with Gian Paolo Chiti a little multimedia opera, Matrona quaedam.
