= Andalucía Rally =

Off-road vehicle race

- Region: Spain
- Inaugural season: 2020
- Folded: 2022
- Official website: andaluciarallyodc.com

The Andalucía Rally was a rally raid held in Andalucia, Spain, from 2020 to 2022. The event was part of the World Rally-Raid Championship in 2021 and 2022.

The race was introduced in 2020 as a replacement for the Rallye du Maroc, which was cancelled for that year due to the COVID-19 pandemic. Organized by ASO and the ODC company, represented by David Castera, it was intended as a shakedown for the Dakar Rally. It typically took place in June, though the 2022 edition was moved to October due to a heat wave in the region.

== Winners ==
=== Cars ===
Year	Driver	Codriver	Car
2020	(Qatar) Nasser Al-Attiyah	(France) Matthieu Baumel	Toyota Hilux
2021	(Qatar) Nasser Al-Attiyah	(France) Matthieu Baumel	Toyota Hilux Overdrive
2022	(France) Sébastien Loeb	(Belgium) Fabian Lurquin	BRX Hunter T1+

=== Motorcycles ===
Year	Rider	Motorcycle
2020	(Argentina) Kevin Benavides	Honda CRF450 Rally
2021	(Spain) Joan Barreda	Honda CRF450 Rally
2022	(France) Adrien Van Beveren	Honda CRF450 Rally
