= Vollore-Montagne =

- Commune
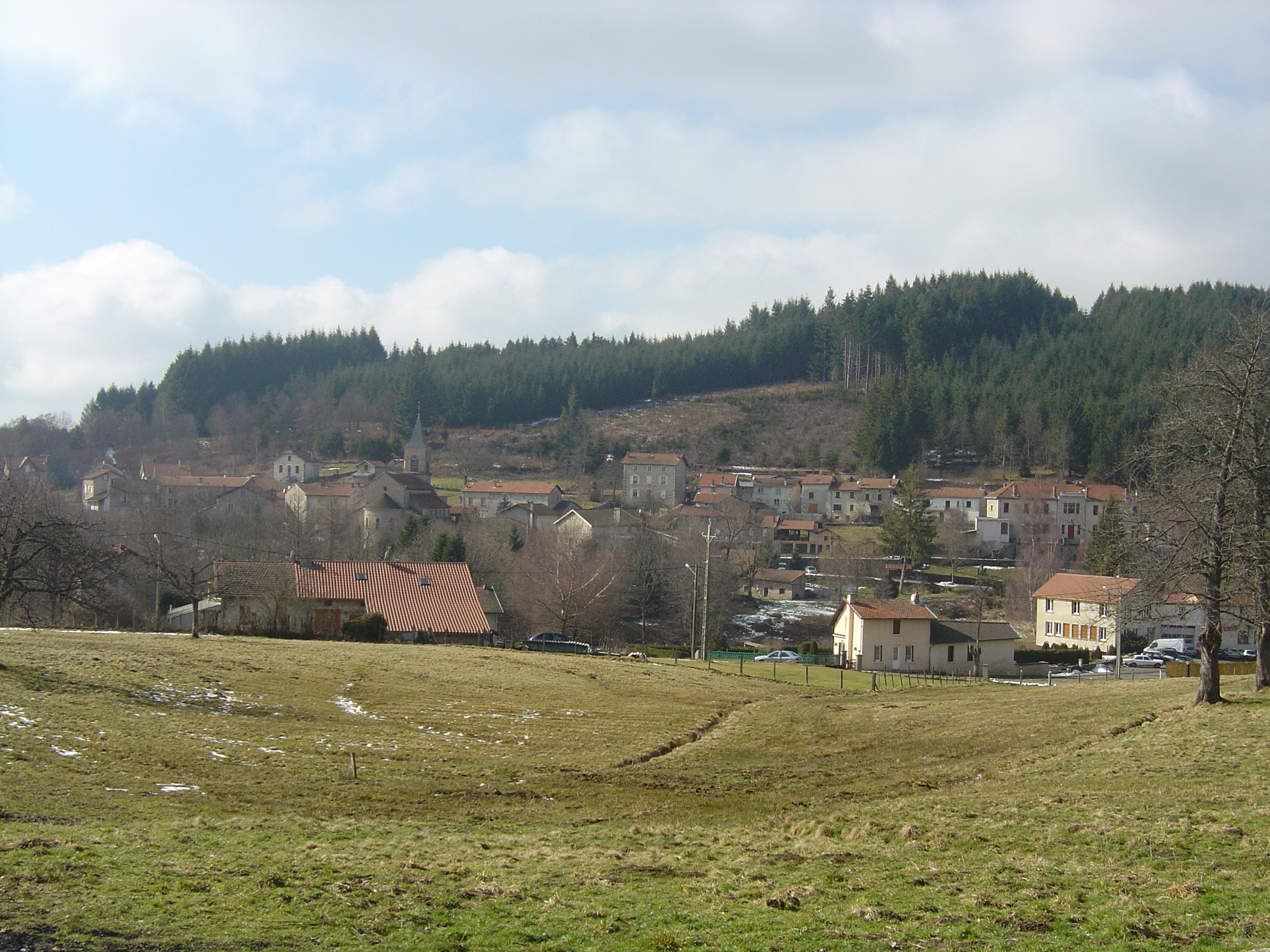
- A general view of Vollore-Montagne

- Coat of arms
- Location of Vollore-Montagne
- Location within France Location within Auvergne-Rhône-Alpes
- Coordinates: 45°47′09″N 3°40′28″E
- Country: France
- Region: Auvergne-Rhône-Alpes
- Department: Puy-de-Dôme
- Arrondissement: Thiers
- Canton: Thiers
- Intercommunality: Thiers Dore et Montagne

Government
  - Mayor (2020–2026): Jean-François Delaire
- Area^{1}: 21.22 km^{2} (8.19 sq mi)
- Highest elevation: 1,267 m (4,157 ft)
- Lowest elevation: 620 m (2,030 ft)
- Population (2023): 312
  - Density: 14.7/km^{2} (38.1/sq mi)
- Time zone: UTC+01:00 (CET)
  - Summer (DST): UTC+02:00 (CEST)
- INSEE/Postal code: 63468 /63120
- ^{1} French Land Register data, which excludes lakes, ponds, glaciers > 1 km^{2} (0.386 sq mi or 247 acres) and river estuaries.

Vollore-Montagne (French pronunciation: [vɔlɔʁ mɔ̃taɲ]; Occitan: Volora de Montanha) is a commune in the Puy-de-Dôme department in Auvergne in central France.

== Population ==
Historical population
Year	Pop.	±% p.a.
1968	623	—
1975	520	−2.55%
1982	450	−2.04%
1990	397	−1.55%
1999	371	−0.75%
2007	347	−0.83%
2012	305	−2.55%
2017	305	+0.00%
2023	312	+0.38%
Source: INSEE

== See also ==
- Communes of the Puy-de-Dôme department
