= 2025 FIM Sand Races World Championship =

World championship of beach racing in 2025

- 2025 FIM Sand Races World Championship logo
- Duration: 8 February 2025 - 15 February 2026
- Races: 6

Champions
- Motorcycles: Todd Kellett
- Women's: Mathilde Denis
- Veteran's: Fernando Rubio
- Junior's: Matheo Gerat
- Vintage: Freddy Seguin
- Quads: Pablo Violet
- Quad Veteran's: Benoît Sebert

Seasons
- ← 2024 2026-2027 →

The 2025 FIM Sand Races World Championship was the 1st FIM Sand Races World Championship season. The series marked the first season that there has been an FIM World Championship for the Beach racing discipline.

The FIM ran an FIM Sand Races World Cup in the 2023 and 2024 seasons, with British rider Todd Kellett winning both World Cup titles in the motorcycle category. After winning five of the six rounds, Kellett was able to be crowned as the first FIM World Champion of the discipline.

The series included six rounds and was bookended by the 2025 and 2026 editions of the Enduropale du Touquet event.

== Race calendar and results ==
A provisional calendar was released on 16 January 2025. The championship was contested over six rounds in Western Europe and Argentina.

Round	Date	Location	Motorcycle Winner	Quad Winner	Report
1	8–9 February	(France) Enduropale du Touquet	(United Kingdom) Todd Kellett	(Germany) Manfred Zienecker	
2	29–31 August	(Argentina) Enduro del Invierno	(United Kingdom) Todd Kellett	(France) Pablo Violet	
3	24–26 October	(Italy) Bibione Sand Storm	(United Kingdom) Todd Kellett	(Belgium) Dirk Schelfhout	
4	21-23 November	(France) Ronde des Sables Hossegor-Capbreton	(United Kingdom) Todd Kellett	(France) Pablo Violet	
5	29–30 November	(Portugal) Monte Gordo Sand Race	(Belgium) Cyril Genot	(United Kingdom) Harry Walker	
6	13–15 February 2026	(France) Enduropale du Touquet	(United Kingdom) Todd Kellett	' (France) Pablo Violet	

Names in Italics were the highest placed FIM-eligible rider in the event when the event was won by a non-eligible rider.

== Moto ==
=== Entry list ===
Sand Races World Championship
Constructor	Team	Rider	Rounds
Beta	Equipe Police Nationale/Elite Moto Lannion	(France) David Abgrall	1
Fantic	Team MS Motorsport Fantic	(France) Maxime Sot	1, 3, 5
Fantic	Team MS Motorsport Fantic	(Netherlands) Lars van Berkel	3–5
Fantic		(France) Paul Arnout	1, 3–6
Fantic	Fantic Factory Racing Team	(Italy) Matteo Pavoni	3
Fantic		(France) Timothée Hillairet-Collet	3–5
Gas Gas	Twenty Racing Suspension Gas Gas	(Netherlands) Jeremy Knuiman	1
Gas Gas	Twenty Racing Suspension Gas Gas	(Netherlands) Damien Knuiman	1
Gas Gas		(France) Wesley Tanfin	1
Gas Gas		(France) Maximilien Poul	3, 5
Honda	Team Honda Motoblouz SR Motul	(Netherlands) Lars van Berkel	1
Honda	Team Honda Motoblouz SR Motul	(Norway) Håkon Fredriksen	3–5
Honda	Team Honda Motoblouz SR Motul	(Belgium) Julien Lieber	5
Honda	Team Honda Motoblouz SR Motul	(Belgium) Cyril Genot	1, 3–5
Honda	Avant Pro Honda	(Belgium) Cyril Genot	2
Honda	Team Dafy Dunlop Wonderbike	(France) Paolo Maschio	1, 3–5
Honda	Team Dafy Dunlop Wonderbike	(France) Alexis Collignon	1
Honda	Honda YPF MX Racing	(France) Alexis Collignon	2
Honda		(France) Timothée Hillairet-Collet	1
Honda		(France) Jean Collignon	1
Honda	S Briggs Commercial	(United Kingdom) Ashley Greedy	1
Honda		(France) Damien Champolivier	1, 3–5
Honda	SMQ Competicion	(Uruguay) Ramiro Marquez	1–3
Honda	Freytes Motorsport	(Venezuela) Anthony Rodríguez	2
Honda	Cabarcos Motos	(United Kingdom) Sion Talbot	2
Husqvarna	Kaeser Racing Team	(Germany) Daniel Wagenpfeil	All
Husqvarna	GI Cross Racing Team	(Italy) Matteo del Coco	3
Husqvarna	Osellini Moto	(Italy) Lorenzo Macoritto	3
Husqvarna		(France) Ernest Lescaillet	3–5
Husqvarna		(France) Jean Collignon	5
Husqvarna	VitamineH Lille	(France) Marshall Meplon	6
Husqvarna		(France) Arthur Mioque	3–5
KTM		(France) Arthur Mioque	1, 6
KTM	Darjen	(United Kingdom) Sion Talbot	1, 3–6
Suzuki	Suzuki Moto France	(France) Camille Chapeliere	1, 3
Suzuki	Big Trail Argentina/Marelli Sports	(France) Camille Chapeliere	2
Triumph		(France) Maximilien Poul	1
Yamaha	Monster Energy Yamaha France Drag'On Tek	(United Kingdom) Todd Kellett	All
Yamaha	Monster Energy Yamaha France Drag'On Tek	(France) Milko Potisek	All
Yamaha	Monster Energy Yamaha France Drag'On Tek	(Netherlands) Damien Knuiman	3–6
Yamaha	Yamaha Motor France/Drag'On	(France) Jérémy Hauquier	1, 3–6
Yamaha	Race Machines	(France) Jérémy Hauquier	2
Yamaha	Race Machines	(France) Paul Arnout	2
Yamaha	Race Machines	(France) Ernest Lescaillet	2
Yamaha	Race Machines	(France) Mathéo Miot	2
Yamaha	Yam Sand Racing	(France) Mathéo Miot	1, 4
Yamaha	Yam Sand Racing	(France) Florian Miot	1
Yamaha	Team 33 Accessoires/IPONE/Groland Racing Team	(France) Joey Nuques	1, 3, 6
Yamaha	Big Trail Argentina/Marelli Sports	(France) Joey Nuques	2
Yamaha	Drag'On Tek	(Belgium) Tias Callens	1, 3–6
Yamaha		(France) Damien Prevot	1, 3, 5
Yamaha	Autos Motos Saint Dizier/Yamaha France	(France) Victor Brossier	1, 3–5
Yamaha		(France) Eddy Mollon	1
Yamaha		(France) Thomas Penel	1
Yamaha		(France) Wesley Tanfin	3–6
Yamaha		(France) Maxime Berteau	3–4
Yamaha	Yamaha France/Drag'On Tek/Evolution7 Limoges	(France) Valentin Madoulaud	3–4
Yamaha	Motos VR Yamaha	(Portugal) Luís Outeiro	5
Women's World Cup
Constructor	Team	Rider	Rounds
Fantic	Drag'On Tek/Yamaha France	(France) Mathilde Denis	3–5
Gas Gas	MX Fonta Racing Syneco	(Italy) Kiara Fontanesi	3
KTM		(France) Sara Jugla	All
Yamaha	Team New Bike Yamaha	(Belgium) Amandine Verstappen	All
Yamaha	Yam Sand Racing	(France) Camille Viaud	1, 3–6
Yamaha	Big Trail Argentina/Marelli Sports	(France) Camille Viaud	2
Yamaha	Drag'On Tek/Yamaha France	(France) Mathilde Denis	1–2, 6
Veteran's World Cup
Constructor	Team	Rider	Rounds
Ducati		(France) Antoine Méo	3
Fantic		(France) Bernard Perard	1, 3–6
Gas Gas		(France) Alexis van de Woestyne	3–6
Honda		(France) Dominique Mieuzet	All
Honda	SMQ Competicion	(Uruguay) Fernando Rubio	All
Honda		(France) Timothée Vacherand	3
Honda		(France) Rodrigue Lescaillet	3–6
Honda		(Italy) Andrea Bergamo	3
Honda		(France) Stéphane Dufay	3
Kawasaki		(Argentina) Danilo Goes	2
Kawasaki	Race Machines	(France) Rodrigue Lescaillet	1–2
Kawasaki	Race Machines	(France) Bernard Perard	2
Kawasaki		(France) Guillaume Renaux	5
KTM		(France) Jean-François Mioque	1, 3–6
KTM		(France) Paul Barbara	1, 3–6
KTM		(France) Christophe Brucker	1
Yamaha		(France) Nicolas Lavenant	All
Yamaha		(Belgium) Andre Vossius	All
Yamaha	Fino Motor Racing	(Portugal) António Maio	5
Yamaha		(France) Damien Prevot	5
Junior's World Cup
Constructor	Team	Rider	Rounds
Fantic		(France) Clement Vanderstraeten	1
Fantic		(France) Noe Dehen	1, 3–6
Gas Gas	Twenty Racing Suspension Gas Gas	(Netherlands) Damien Knuiman	1
Gas Gas		(France) Ema Satabin	1, 3–4
Gas Gas	Dafy Moto St Quentin	(France) Evan Demeester	1
Honda	Dafy Moto St Quentin/Wonderbike	(France) Evan Demeester	3–6
Husqvarna		(Netherlands) Dean Gregoire	4
Kawasaki	Bud Racing/Kawasaki France	(France) Lea Chaput	4, 6
Kawasaki	Kawasaki France/FSR Suspension	(France) Maxime Miet	3–6
KTM	Team ANS Racing	(France) Maxime Miet	1
KTM	Motovation Motosport	(Netherlands) Dean Gregoire	1
KTM	Grizzly Racing Service	(Israel) Ben Almagor	4, 6
Yamaha	CC Motorsports	(France) Matheo Gerat	1, 3–6
Vintage World Cup
Constructor	Team	Rider	Rounds
Honda		(France) Freddy Seguin	3–5
Honda		(France) Florian Miot	4
Honda		(France) Jean Collignon	4
Kawasaki		(Argentina) Danilo Goes	2
KTM		(France) Sébastien Antony	3–5
Yamaha		(France) Max Bianucci	4
Yamaha		(France) Nicolas Lavenant	4

=== Sand Races World Championship ===
Only riders who are registered for the FIM Sand Races World Championship were eligible to score championship points.

- Points for final positions are awarded as follows:

Position	1st	2nd	3rd	4th	5th	6th	7th	8th	9th	10th	11th	12th	13th	14th	15th+
Points	25	20	16	13	11	10	9	8	7	6	5	4	3	2	1

Rounds 1, 4 & 6 finishing positions are shown relative to where the rider finished in the event overall. Round 2, 3 & 5 results shown as finishing positions among FIM-registered riders only.

The FIM World Championship points accrued from the finish are shown next to the position.

Pos.	Rider	LTO (France)	EDI (Argentina)	BSS (Italy)	HOS (France)	MGS (Portugal)	LTO (France)	Points
1	(United Kingdom) Todd Kellett	1^{25}	1^{25}	1^{25}	1^{25}	18^{1}	1^{25}	126
2	(France) Milko Potisek	2^{20}	2^{20}	5^{11}	2^{20}	3^{16}	3^{20}	107
3	(France) Jeremy Hauquier	9^{9}	4^{13}	3^{16}	4^{13}	2^{20}	10^{13}	84
4	(Belgium) Tias Callens	11^{7}		7^{9}	12^{7}	6^{10}	9^{16}	49
5	(Netherlands) Lars van Berkel	3^{16}		29^{1}	3^{16}	4^{13}		46
6	(Belgium) Cyril Genot	Ret	3^{16}	19^{1}	Ret	1^{25}		42
7	(Netherlands) Damien Knuiman	31^{1}		4^{13}	8^{9}	7^{9}	462^{1}	33
8	(United Kingdom) Sion Talbot	58^{1}	8^{8}	15^{1}	42^{5}	12^{4}	38^{10}	29
9	(France) Paolo Maschio	15^{6}		6^{10}	5^{11}	36^{1}		28
10	(France) Joey Nuques	18^{4}	5^{11}	23^{1}			13^{11}	27
11	(France) Mathéo Miot	5^{13}	13^{3}		7^{10}			26
12	(Norway) Håkon Fredriksen			2^{20}	Ret	14^{2}		22
13	(France) Alexis Collignon	7^{11}	6^{10}					21
14	(France) Victor Brossier	17^{5}		9^{7}	18^{6}	24^{1}		19
15	(Germany) Daniel Wagenpfeil	214^{1}	10^{6}	16^{1}	111^{4}	20^{1}	158^{5}	18
16	(France) Paul Arnout	323^{1}	11^{5}	18^{1}	Ret	15^{1}	88^{8}	16
17	(Belgium) Amandine Verstappen	95^{1}	9^{7}	13^{3}	Ret	13^{3}	Ret	14
18	(Belgium) Julien Lieber					5^{11}		11
19	(France) Florian Miot	8^{10}						10
20	(France) Camille Viaud	181^{1}	18^{1}	20^{1}	Ret	19^{1}	148^{6}	10
21	(France) Nicolas Lavenant	499^{1}	12^{4}	37^{1}	213^{1}	29^{1}	288^{2}	10
22	(France) Marshall Meplon						73^{9}	9
23	(Venezuela) Anthony Rodríguez		7^{9}					9
24	(France) Valentin Madoulaud			28^{1}	11^{8}			9
25	(France) Arthur Mioque	Ret		17^{1}	Ret	17^{1}	93^{7}	9
26	(Portugal) Luís Outeiro					8^{8}		8
27	(Italy) Matteo del Coco			8^{8}				8
28	(Netherlands) Jeremy Knuiman	10^{8}						8
29	(France) Damien Prevot	Ret		26^{1}		9^{7}		8
30	(France) Alexis van de Woestyne			22^{1}	190^{2}	32^{1}	279^{3}	7
31	(France) Maxime Sot	Ret		27^{1}		10^{6}		7
32	(France) Timothée Hillairet-Collet	30^{2}		12^{4}	Ret	26^{1}		7
33	(Italy) Matteo Pavoni			10^{6}				6
34	(France) Wesley Tanfin	756^{1}		21^{1}	151^{3}	22^{1}	Ret	6
35	(France) Rodrigue Lescaillet	552^{1}	19^{1}	38^{1}	286^{1}	34^{1}	564^{1}	6
36	(Belgium) Andre Vossius	771^{1}	21^{1}	41^{1}	309^{1}	31^{1}	704^{1}	6
37	(France) Jean Collignon	116^{1}				11^{5}		6
38	(Italy) Lorenzo Macoritto			11^{5}				5
39	(France) Ernest Lescaillet		14^{2}	30^{1}	229^{1}	23^{1}		5
40	(France) Dominique Mieuzet	800^{1}	16^{1}	35^{1}	Ret	28^{1}	507^{1}	5
41	(France) Mathilde Denis						181^{4}	4
42	(France) Bernard Perard	691^{1}	20^{1}	DSQ	Ret	33^{1}	682^{1}	4
43	(France) Paul Barbara	576^{1}		34^{1}	211^{1}	27^{1}		4
44	(France) Damien Champolivier	421^{1}		31^{1}	203^{1}	25^{1}		4
45	(France) David Abgrall	22^{3}						3
46	(France) Jean-François Mioque	Ret		39^{1}	Ret	35^{1}	495^{1}	3
47	(Italy) Kiara Fontanesi			14^{2}				2
48	(France) Maximilien Poul	Ret		Ret^{1}		21^{1}		2
49	(France) Maxime Berteau			33^{1}	266^{1}			2
50	(Uruguay) Ramiro Marquez	Ret	15^{1}	36^{1}				2
51	(Uruguay) Fernando Rubio						300^{1}	1
52	(Portugal) António Maio					30^{1}		1
53	(France) Guillaume Renaux					16^{1}		1
54	(Italy) Andrea Bergamo			42^{1}				1
55	(France) Camille Chapeliere	Ret	Ret	25^{1}				1
56	(France) Stéphane Dufay			40^{1}				1
57	(France) Timothée Vacherand			24^{1}				1
58	(France) Antoine Méo			32^{1}				1
59	(Argentina) Danilo Goes		17^{1}					1
60	(France) Eddy Mollon	36^{1}						1
	(United Kingdom) Ashley Greedy	Ret						0
	(France) Thomas Penel	Ret						0
Pos.	Rider	LTO (France)	EDI (Argentina)	BSS (Italy)	HOS (France)	MGS (Portugal)	LTO (France)	Points

=== Women's World Cup ===
Rider's finishing positions are shown relative to where they finished amongst FIM-eligible riders.

Pos.	Rider	LTO (France)	EDI (Argentina)	BSS (Italy)	HOS (France)	MGS (Portugal)	LTO (France)	Points
1	(France) Mathilde Denis	3	2	3	1	3	2	113
2	(Belgium) Amandine Verstappen	1	1	1	Ret	1	Ret	100
3	(France) Camille Viaud	2	3	4	Ret	2	1	94
4	(France) Sara Jugla	4	4	5	2	4	3	86
5	(Italy) Kiara Fontanesi			2				20
Pos.	Rider	LTO (France)	EDI (Argentina)	BSS (Italy)	HOS (France)	MGS (Portugal)	LTO (France)	Points

=== Veteran's World Cup ===
Rider's finishing positions are shown relative to where they finished amongst FIM-eligible riders.

Pos.	Rider	LTO (France)	EDI (Argentina)	BSS (Italy)	HOS (France)	MGS (Portugal)	LTO (France)	Points
1	(Uruguay) Fernando Rubio	2	1	1	2	3	3	122
2	(France) Nicolas Lavenant	3	2	6	4	6	2	89
3	(France) Alexis van de Woestyne			2	1	8	1	78
4	(France) Paul Barbara	5		4	3	4	6	63
5	(France) Dominique Mieuzet	8	3	5	Ret	5	5	57
6	(France) Rodrigue Lescaillet	4	5	8	5	11	7	57
7	(Belgium) Andre Vossius	7	7	11	6	9	9	47
8	(France) Bernard Perard	6	6	DSQ	Ret	10	8	34
9	(France) Damien Prevot					1		25
10	(France) Christophe Brucker	1						25
11	(France) Jean-François Mioque	Ret		9	Ret	12	4	24
12	(France) Guillaume Renaux					2		20
13	(France) Timothée Vacherand			3				16
14	(Argentina) Danilo Goes		4					13
15	(Portugal) António Maio					7		9
16	(France) Antoine Méo			7				9
17	(France) Stéphane Dufay			10				6
18	(Italy) Andrea Bergamo			12				4
Pos.	Rider	LTO (France)	EDI (Argentina)	BSS (Italy)	HOS (France)	MGS (Portugal)	LTO (France)	Points

=== Junior's World Cup ===
Rounds 1, 4 & 6 finishing positions are shown relative to where the rider finished in the event overall. Rounds 3 & 5 results shown as finishing positions among FIM-registered riders only.

The FIM World Championship points accrued from the finish are shown next to the position.

Pos.	Rider	LTO (France)	EDI (Argentina)	BSS (Italy)	HOS (France)	MGS (Portugal)	LTO (France)	Points
1	(France) Matheo Gerat	16^{13}		2^{20}	8^{16}	2^{20}	12^{25}	94
2	(France) Evan Demeester	7^{16}		1^{25}	6^{20}	1^{25}	Ret	86
3	(France) Maxime Miet	18^{11}		3^{16}	14^{11}	3^{16}	29^{20}	74
4	(France) Noe Dehen	106^{9}		4^{13}	40^{10}	4^{13}	68^{16}	60
5	(Netherlands) Dean Gregoire	5^{20}			3^{25}			45
6	(France) Lea Chaput	67^{9}			52^{9}		98^{13}	31
7	(France) Ema Satabin	181^{8}		5^{11}	54^{9}			27
8	(Netherlands) Damien Knuiman	1^{25}						25
9	(Israel) Ben Almagor				9^{13}		Ret	13
10	(France) Clement Vanderstraeten	39^{10}						10
Pos.	Rider	LTO (France)	EDI (Argentina)	BSS (Italy)	HOS (France)	MGS (Portugal)	LTO (France)	Points

=== Vintage World Cup ===
Rider's finishing positions are shown relative to where they finished amongst FIM-eligible riders.

Pos.	Rider	LTO (France)	EDI (Argentina)	BSS (Italy)	HOS (France)	MGS (Portugal)	LTO (France)	Points
1	(France) Freddy Seguin			1	4	1		63
2	(France) Sebastien Antony			2	3	2		56
3	(France) Florian Miot				1			25
4	(Argentina) Danilo Goes		1					25
5	(France) Jean Collignon				2			20
6	(France) Max Bianucci				5			11
7	(France) Nicolas Lavenant				6			10
Pos.	Rider	LTO (France)	EDI (Argentina)	BSS (Italy)	HOS (France)	MGS (Portugal)	LTO (France)	Points

== Quad ==
=== Entry list ===
Quad World Cup
Constructor	Team	Rider	Rounds
Honda		(Belgium) Oliver Vandendijck	1, 3–6
Honda		(Belgium) Glenn De Swarte	1, 3–6
Honda		(Germany) Manfred Zienecker	1
Honda		(France) Emmanuel Sarran	1
Honda		(Italy) Rodolfo Codazzi	3
Honda	Quadyland	(France) Paul Waterlot	4–5
Husqvarna		(Czech Republic) Lukas Prochazka	3
Laeger's	Drag'on ATV/Laeger's	(United Kingdom) Harry Walker	5
Yamaha	Drag'On ATV	(France) Pablo Violet	All
Yamaha	Drag'On ATV	(Estonia) Karl Robin Rillo	6
Yamaha	Quadyland	(France) Paul Waterlot	1
Yamaha		(France) Maxime Lopes da Fonseca	1, 3–6
Yamaha		(France) Fabien Michel	1, 3–6
Yamaha		(France) Aloïs Waloszek	6
Yamaha	Solbas Motorsport	(Argentina) Gaston Saos	6
Quad Veteran's World Cup
Constructor	Team	Rider	Rounds
Can-Am		(United Kingdom) Graham Guy	3–6
Honda		(Belgium) Dirk Schelfhout	1, 3–6
Yamaha	Drag'On ATV	(France) Axel Dutrie	1, 3–6
Yamaha		(Portugal) Nuno Gonçalves	1, 3–6
Yamaha		(France) Guillaume Waloszek	1, 3–5
Yamaha		(Portugal) Paulo Fernandes	1, 3–6
Yamaha		(France) Laurent Delcourt	1, 3–6
Yamaha		(France) Cedric Girard	1
Yamaha		(France) Benoît Sebert	All
Yamaha		(United Kingdom) Graham Guy	1
Yamaha	Knull Racing	(Portugal) Jorge Sampaio	5

=== Quad Standings ===
Only riders who are registered for the FIM Sand Races World Championship are eligible to score championship points.

- Points for final positions are awarded as follows:

Position	1st	2nd	3rd	4th	5th	6th	7th	8th	9th	10th	11th	12th	13th	14th	15th+
Points	25	20	16	13	11	10	9	8	7	6	5	4	3	2	1

Rider's finishing positions are shown relative to where they finished in the event overall. Rounds 3 & 5 results are shown as finishing positions among FIM-registered riders only.

The FIM World Championship points accrued from the finish are shown next to the position.

Pos.	Rider	LTO (France)	EDI (Argentina)	BSS (Italy)	HOS (France)	MGS (Portugal)	LTO (France)	Points
1	(France) Pablo Violet	8^{20}	25^{25}	6^{10}	17^{25}	2^{20}	6^{25}	125
2	(France) Fabien Michel	24^{16}		2^{20}	54^{10}	16^{1}	22^{20}	67
3	(Belgium) Dirk Schelfhout	Ret		1^{25}	23^{16}	5^{11}	29^{11}	63
4	(France) Benoît Sebert	63^{6}	69^{20}	7^{9}	65^{8}	7^{9}	101^{9}	61
5	(Portugal) Nuno Gonçalves	35^{10}		5^{11}	33^{11}	8^{8}	28^{13}	53
6	(Belgium) Olivier Vandendijck	Ret		Ret^{2}	19^{20}	3^{16}	42^{10}	48
7	(France) Axel Dutrie	32^{13}		3^{16}	Ret	6^{10}	Ret	39
8	(France) Maxime Lopes da Fonseca	55^{8}		4^{13}	57^{9}	13^{3}	Ret	33
9	(France) Paul Waterlot	51^{9}			24^{13}	11^{5}		27
10	(United Kingdom) Harry Walker					1^{25}		25
11	(Germany) Manfred Zienecker	6^{25}						25
12	(Belgium) Glenn De Swarte	Ret		9^{7}	114^{5}	4^{13}	Ret	25
13	(France) Laurent Delcourt	Ret		8^{8}	134^{4}	12^{4}	115^{7}	23
14	(Portugal) Paulo Fernandes	68^{5}		12^{4}	99^{7}	9^{7}	Ret	23
15	(France) Guillaume Waloszek	104^{4}		13^{3}	103^{6}	10^{6}		19
16	(France) Aloïs Waloszek						27^{16}	16
17	(United Kingdom) Graham Guy	297^{3}		11^{5}	Ret	14^{2}	135^{6}	16
18	(France) Emmanuel Sarran	34^{11}						11
19	(Argentina) Gaston Saos						110^{8}	8
20	(France) Cédric Girard	59^{7}						7
21	(Czech Republic) Lukas Prochazka			10^{6}				6
22	(Portugal) Jorge Sampaio					15^{1}		1
23	(Italy) Rodolfo Codazzi			Ret^{1}				1
	(Estonia) Karl Robin Rillo						Ret	0
Pos.	Rider	LTO (France)	EDI (Argentina)	BSS (Italy)	HOS (France)	MGS (Portugal)	LTO (France)	Points

=== Quad Veteran's World Cup ===
Rider's finishing positions are shown relative to where they finished amongst FIM-eligible riders.

Pos.	Rider	LTO (France)	EDI (Argentina)	BSS (Italy)	HOS (France)	MGS (Portugal)	LTO (France)	Points
1	(France) Benoît Sebert	4	1	4	3	3	3	99
2	(Belgium) Dirk Schelfhout	Ret		1	1	1	2	95
3	(Portugal) Nuno Gonçalves	2		3	2	4	1	94
4	(France) Axel Dutrie	1		2	Ret	2	Ret	65
5	(Portugal) Paulo Fernandes	5		6	4	5	Ret	45
6	(France) Guillaume Waloszek	6		7	5	6		40
7	(United Kingdom) Graham Guy	7		8	Ret	8	5	36
8	(France) Laurent Delcourt	Ret		5		7	4	33
9	(France) Cedric Girard	3						16
10	(Portugal) Jorge Sampaio					9		7
Pos.	Rider	LTO (France)	EDI (Argentina)	BSS (Italy)	HOS (France)	MGS (Portugal)	LTO (France)	Points
