= 2024 FIM Sand Races World Cup =

The 2024 FIM Sand Races World Cup was the second running of the FIM Sand Races World Cup with a calendar expanded to 6 events. 2023 winner Todd Kellett was able to successfully defend his title in the 2024 season by winning every round. 48 riders competed.

== Race calendar and results ==
The 4th round was initially scheduled to be the Weston Beach Race on 12–13 October. This was later changed to the Ronde des Sables de Loon Plage on 26-27 October. The Ronde des Sables Hossegor-Capbreton, originally scheduled for 7–8 December, was changed to 30 November–1 December.

Round	Date	Location	Motocycle winner	Quad winner	Womens winner	Veterans winner	Source
1	2–4 February	(France) Enduropale du Touquet	(United Kingdom) Todd Kellett; Yamaha	(France) Pablo Violet; Yamaha	(Belgium) Amandine Verstappen; Yamaha	(France) Mickael De Souza; KTM	
2	23–25 February	(Argentina) Enduro del Verano	(United Kingdom) Todd Kellett; Yamaha	(France) Pablo Violet; Yamaha	(Belgium) Amandine Verstappen; Yamaha	(Argentina) Javier Pizzolito; Honda	
3	26-27 October	(France) Ronde des Sables de Loon Plage	(United Kingdom) Todd Kellett (Note: Belgian Cyril Genot won the race with Kellet second. However, Genot was not registered for the World Cup.); Yamaha	(France) Keveen Rochereau (Note: Frenchman Keveen Rochereau won the race but was not registered for the World Cup. The highest registered rider was Rochereau in third.); Honda	(Belgium) Amandine Verstappen; Yamaha	(France) Mickael De Souza; Honda	
4	1-3 November	(Italy) Bibione Sand Storm	(United Kingdom) Todd Kellett; Yamaha	(France) Keveen Rochereau; Honda	(Belgium) Amandine Verstappen; Yamaha	(France) Gregory Deleu; Fantic	
5	22–24 November	(Portugal) Monte Gordo Sand Experience	(United Kingdom) Todd Kellett; Yamaha	(France) Keveen Rochereau; Honda	(Belgium) Amandine Verstappen; Yamaha	(France) Dominique Mieuzet; Honda	
6	30 November–1 December	(France) Ronde des Sables Hossegor-Capbreton	(United Kingdom) Todd Kellett; Yamaha	(France) Keveen Rochereau (Note: Non-World Cup registered Antoine Cheurlin won the race. Rochereau was the highest placed registered rider in third.); Honda	(Belgium) Amandine Verstappen; Yamaha	(France) Mickael De Souza; Honda	

== Categories and classes ==
Category	Capacity & age	Class			
Category	Capacity & age	Overall	Junior	Veteran	Women
Motorcycles	Up to 510 cc, 18+ years (38+ years Veteran class)	check		check	check
Motorcycle Junior 1	100-125 cc two-strokes, 13-17 years		check		check
Motorcycle Junior 2	Up to 250 cc four strokes, 15-17 years		check		check
Vintage Motorcycle V1 'EVO'	Pre-1997 single shock motorcycles (Note: Motorcycles in the Vintage classes must be equipped with a steel frame and brake and suspension systems from the period.) up to 510 cc, 18+ years	check			check
Vintage Motorcycle V2 'Classic'	Pre-1997 twin shock motorcycles up to 510 cc, 18+ years	check			check
Quad	Unlimited capacity, 18+ years (38+ years Veteran class)	check		check	check
Quad Junior	Up to 550 cc, 15-17 years		check		check
Vintage Quad	Pre-2004 quads up to 800 cc, 18+ years	check			
SSV	Side by Side Vehicles up to 1050cc, 16+ years	check			

== Championship standings ==
- Points for final positions are awarded as follows:

Position	1st	2nd	3rd	4th	5th	6th	7th	8th	9th	10th	11th	12th	13th	14th	15th+
Points	25	20	16	13	11	10	9	8	7	6	5	4	3	2	1

=== Motos ===
Motorcycle Sand Races World Cup
Pos.	Rider	Make	LTO (France)	EDV (Argentina)	RLP (France)	BSS (Italy)	MGS (Portugal)	RHC (France)	Points
1	(United Kingdom) Todd Kellett	Yamaha	1	1	1	1	1	1	150
2	(France) Jeremy Hauquier	Yamaha	4	6	3	3	2	3	91
3	(France) Maxime Sot	Gas Gas	3	3	8	14	4	4	68
4	(France) Valentin Madoulaud	Yamaha	6	11	10	4	3	6	60
5	(Netherlands) Lars van Berkel	Honda	2	4	2			ret	53
6	(Belgium) Yentel Martens	Husqvarna	ret		6	2	5	5	52
7	(France) Camille Chapeliere	Gas Gas	ret	2	7	ret	7	7	47
8	(France) Joey Nuques	Yamaha	5	7	11	16	ret	2	46
9	(Belgium) Tias Callens	Yamaha			5	5	6	8	40
10	(Belgium) Junior Bal	Husqvarna	8		4	15		9	29
11	(France) Jean Collignon	Kawasaki	10	9	14	10	9	18	29
12	(France) Enzo Levrault	Gas Gas	13	12	9	6	ret	12	28
13	(France) Timotée Hillairet-Collet	Gas Gas	7	8	12	ret	ret	11	26
14	(Belgium) Amandine Verstappen	Yamaha	16	13	16	7	10	17	21
15	(France) Nathan Vidal	Husqvarna	ret		17	8	12	15	14
16	(France) Romain Laurent	Husqvarna	ret		13		8	13	14
17	(France) Adrien Van Beveren	Honda		5					11
18	(France) Gregory Deleu	Yamaha	22		23	12	14	24	9
19	(France) Dominique Mieuzet	Gas Gas	27		24	13	13	28	9
20	(Germany) Daniel Wagenpfeil	Husqvarna			20	9			8
21	(France) Mickael De Souza	KTM	11		18			14	8
22	(France) Maximilien Poul	Gas Gas	19		21	11	ret	21	8
23	(France) Nicolas Bizet	Honda	9						7
24	(France) Romain Dumontier	Husqvarna						10	6
25	(Argentina) Javier Pizzolito	Honda		10					6
26	(France) Guillaume Renaux	Yamaha	12		ret	20	15		6
27	(Belgium) Andre Vossius	Yamaha	28	18	26	17	16	27	6
28	(Portugal) Antonio Maio	Yamaha					11		5
29	(France) Thomas Buson	Kawasaki	14		15			16	4
30	(France) Mathilde Denis	Honda	21	16	ret	ret	ret	22	3
31	(France) Bernard Perard	Kawasaki	24		25	ret	17	ret	3
32	(France) Rémi Durand	Husqvarna	20		19			20	3
33	(France) Shange Logan	Honda		14					2
34	(France) Arnaud Besnier	Yamaha	15	15					2
35	(France) Sebastien Antony	Gas Gas	ret		27	19	ret	ret	2
36	(France) Maxime Bouyer	Gas Gas	ret		22			23	2
37	(France) Max Bianucci	Husqvarna	23					26	2
38	(Argentina) Danilo Goes	Kawasaki		17					1
39	(Portugal) Ricardo Freire	Honda	17						1
40	(France) Stephane Dufay	Honda				18			1
41	(France) Christophe Brucker	KTM	18						1
42	(France) Camille Viaud	Yamaha						19	1
43	(France) Pierrick Paget	Triumph				21			1
44	(France) Damien Champolivier	Honda						25	1
45	(France) Mickaël Juchors	Husqvarna	25						1
46	(France) Thomas Penel	Yamaha	26						1
47	(Lithuania) Roman Jakubovskij	Gas Gas	29						1
48	(Lithuania) Vidmantas Perminas	Gas Gas	30						1
	(France) Cyril Magni	Yamaha	ret						0
	(France) Jérémy Bonneau	Husqvarna	ret						0
	(Lithuania) Lukas Perminas	Husqvarna	ret						0
	(Italy) Kiara Fontanesi	Gas Gas				ret			0

Womens Motorcycle Sand Races World Cup
Pos.	Rider	Make	LTO (France)	EDV (Argentina)	RLP (France)	BSS (Italy)	MGS (Portugal)	RHC (France)	Points
1	(Belgium) Amandine Verstappen	Yamaha	1	1	1	1	1	1	150
2	(France) Mathilde Denis	Honda	2	2	ret	ret	ret	3	56
3	(France) Camille Viaud	Yamaha						2	20
	(Italy) Kiara Fontanesi	Gas Gas				ret			0

Veterans Motorcycle Sand Races World Cup
Pos.	Rider	Make	LTO (France)	EDV (Argentina)	RLP (France)	BSS (Italy)	MGS (Portugal)	RHC (France)	Points
1	(France) Gregory Deleu	Yamaha	4		2	1	2	2	98
2	(France) Dominique Mieuzet	Gas Gas	6		3	2	1	4	84
3	(Belgium) Andre Vossius	Yamaha	7	4	5	3	3	3	81
4	(France) Mickael De Souza	KTM	1		1			1	75
5	(France) Arnaud Besnier	Yamaha	2	2					40
6	(France) Bernard Perard	Kawasaki	5		4	ret	4	ret	37
7	(Argentina) Javier Pizzolito	Honda		1					25
8	(Argentina) Danilo Goes	Kawasaki		3					16
9	(France) Christophe Brucker	KTM	3						16
10	(France) Stephane Dufay	Honda				4			13
11	(France) Pierrick Paget	Triumph				5			11
12	(Lithuania) Vidmantas Perminas	Gas Gas	8						8
	(France) Cyril Magni	Yamaha	ret						0
	(France) Guillaume Renaux	Yamaha			ret				0

=== Quads ===
Quad Sand Races World Cup
Pos.	Rider	Make	LTO (France)	EDV (Argentina)	RLP (France)	BSS (Italy)	MGS (Portugal)	RHC (France)	Points
1	(France) Pablo Violet	Yamaha	1	1	2	3	2	6	116
2	(France) Keveen Rochereau	Honda	5		1	1	1	1	111
3	(France) Axel Dutrie	Yamaha	6	4	4	6	4	5	70
4	(Belgium) Olivier Vandendijck	Honda	4		5	4	3	4	66
5	(Germany) Manfred Zienecker	Honda	2			2		2	60
6	(France) Michel Trannin	Yamaha	3	5	Ret	Ret		3	43
7	(France) Antony Baillarguet	Yamaha	Ret		3	8	8	7	41
8	(Portugal) Nuno Gonçalves	Yamaha	8		8	10	9	8	36
9	(France) Maxime Lopes da Fonseca	Yamaha	11		9	5	6	14	35
10	(France) Thierry Vigier	Yamaha	12	6	11	11	10	13	33
11	(France) Benoît Sebert	Yamaha	14	3	13	12	11	Ret	30
12	(France) Emmanuel Sarran	Honda	Ret		7	9		8	24
13	(France) Paul Waterlot	Yamaha	9		Ret	14	7	10	24
14	(Argentina) Hugo Giambruni	Yamaha	18	2					21
15	(Belgium) Glenn De Swarte	Honda	16		Ret	7	5		21
16	(France) Fabien Michel	Yamaha	10		6			11	21
17	(France) Nathanaelle Abgrall	Yamaha	13			17	12	12	12
18	(Portugal) Paulo Fernandes	Yamaha	15		10	15	14	Ret	10
19	(France) Frederic Lefebvre	Yamaha	7						9
20	(France) Guillaume Waloszek	Yamaha	Ret		12	13	17	16	9
21	(France) Frank Violet	Yamaha	17		15		13	15	6
22	(France) Sebastien Degrave	Yamaha	19		14	16	16	Ret	5
23	(France) Adrien Merceron	Yamaha					15		1
24	(Spain) Ivan Solbas Cecilia							17	1
	(United Kingdom) Graham Guy	Yamaha	Ret						0
