= 2023 FIM Sand Races World Cup =

The 2023 FIM Sand Races World Cup was the inaugural season of the FIM Sand Races World Cup. In October 2022 the FIM in conjunction with the French, Portuguese and Argentinian Motorcycling Federations announced the launch of a new FIM Sand Races World Cup series starting in 2023. The inaugural season consisted of three events: The Enduropale du Touquet, France, the Enduro del Verano, Argentina and the Monte Gordo Sand Experience, Portugal. The Enduropale du Touquet and Enduro del Verano were well established and the two most popular sand races in the world. The Monte Gordo Sand Experience was a new event taking place on the large sandy beach of Monte Gordo. 36 riders contested the series and the Cup was won by British rider Todd Kellett.

== Race calendar and results ==
A provisional calendar was announced in October 2022 and the date of the Monte Gordo round confirmed in March 2023.

Round	Date	Location	Motocycle winner	Quad winner	Womens winner	Veterans winner	Juniors1 winner	Juniors2 winner	Vintage winner	Source
1	3–5 February	(France) Enduropale du Touquet	(United Kingdom) Todd Kellett; Yamaha	(France) Michel Trannin; Honda	(Belgium) Amandine Verstappen; Yamaha	(France) Arnaud Besnier; Honda				
2	24–26 February	(Argentina) Enduro del Verano	(United Kingdom) Todd Kellett; Yamaha	(Argentina) Pablo Leonel Vera; Yamaha	(France) Mathilde Denis; Honda	(France) Arnaud Besnier; Honda				
3	17–19 November	(Portugal) Monte Gordo Sand Experience	(Belgium) Yentel Martens; Honda	(France) Keveen Rochereau; Honda	(Belgium) Amandine Verstappen; Yamaha	(France) Arnaud Besnier; Honda	(France) Matheo Gerat; KTM	(France) Sarah Leroy; Kawasaki	(France) Sebastien Antony; Yamaha	

== Race formats ==
All three rounds took place on temporary courses on beaches. The Enduropale du Touquet was a single 3 hour race on the 13 km (8.1 mi) course. At Enduro del Verano there were two heats, a 20 minute sprint on a 3.5 km (2.2 mi) course on the Saturday and a six lap race on the full 12.5 km (7.8 mi) course on Sunday. Two 45 minute races on the 3.5 km (2.2 mi) course was the format at Monte Gordo.

=== Classes ===
The series was divided into classes:

- Motorcycle Sand Races World Cup (up to 510 cc)
- Motorcycle Junior1 Sand Races World Cup (two-strokes 100cc up to 125cc, riders 13-17 years)
- Motorcycle Junior2 Sand Races World Cup (four-strokes up to 250cc, riders 15-17 years)
- Quad Sand Races World Cup (850cc)
- Quad Junior Sand Races World Cup (up to 550cc, riders 15-17 years)
- Vintage Sand Races World Cup (pre-1996 motorcycles)
- SSV Sand Races World Cup
- Women’s Sand Races World Cup
- Veterans Sand Races Trophy (riders 38+ years)

The Womens and Veterans classes run in the main motorcycle race. Junior1 and 2 classes both run in the same race.

== Championship standings ==
- Points for final positions are awarded as follows:

Position	1st	2nd	3rd	4th	5th	6th	7th	8th	9th	10th	11th	12th	13th	14th	15th+
Points	25	20	16	13	11	10	9	8	7	6	5	4	3	2	1

=== Motos ===
Motorcycle Sand Races World Cup
Pos.	Rider	LTO (France)	EDV (Argentina)	MGS (Portugal)	Points
1	(United Kingdom) Todd Kellett	1	1	2	70
2	(Belgium) Yentel Martens	3	3	1	57
3	(Belgium) Daymond Martens	5	5	3	38
4	(France) Camille Chapeliere	ret	2	4	33
5	(France) Enzo Levrault	9	6	5	28
6	(Netherlands) Lars van Berkel	4	4		26
7	(France) Kevin Parpaix	11	9	7	21
8	(Belgium) Cyril Genot	2			20
9	(France) Arnaud Besnier	13	10	11	14
10	(France) Romain Laurent			6	10
11	(France) Valentin Madoulaud	6			10
12	(France) Matheo Miot		7		9
13	(France) Alexis Collignon	7			9
14	(Belgium) Amandine Verstappen	17		8	9
15	(Chile) Javier Vasquez		8		8
16	(Netherlands) Jeremy Knuiman	8			8
17	(France) Guillaume Renaux			9	7
18	(France) Nathan Vidal			10	6
19	(France) Jeremy Hauquier	10			6
20	(Uruguay) Fernando Rubio	ret	11	17	6
21	(France) Mathilde Denis	19	12	16	6
22	(France) Christophe Brucker	15		12	5
23	(United Kingdom) Brad Thornhill	12			4
24	(France) Arthur Mioque			13	3
25	(United Kingdom) Ashley Greedy			14	2
26	(France) Gautier Huyghe	14			2
27	(United Kingdom) Sion Talbot			15	1
28	(France) Sebastien Antony	16			1
29	(France) Thomas Penel			18	1
30	(France) Gregory Deleu	18			1
31	(France) Dominique Mieuzet			19	1
32	(Belgium) Andre Vossius			20	1
33	(France) Laurine Hugues	20			1
34	(France) Stephane Dufay			21	1
35	(France) Bernard Perard	21			1
36	(France) Jean Francois Mioque			22	1
	(France) Milko Potisek	ret			0
	(Sweden) Dennis Putkuri	ret			0
	(France) Romain Dumontier	ret			0
	(France) Marshall Meplon	ret			0
	(Netherlands) Henk Pater	ret			0
	(France) Mathieu Doveze	ret			0
	(United Kingdom) Declan Whittle	ret			0
	(United Kingdom) Edward Jary	ret			0

Womens Motorcycle Sand Races World Cup
Pos.	Rider	LTO (France)	EDV (Argentina)	MGS (Portugal)	Points
1	(France) Mathilde Denis	2	1	2	65
2	(Belgium) Amandine Verstappen	1		1	50
3	(France) Laurine Hugues	3			16

Veterans Motorcycle Sand Races Trophy
Pos.	Rider	LTO (France)	EDV (Argentina)	MGS (Portugal)	Points
1	(France) Arnaud Besnier	1	1	1	75
2	(France) Christophe Brucker	3		2	36
3	(Uruguay) Fernando Rubio	ret	2	3	36
4	(France) Gautier Huyghe	2			20
5	(France) Dominique Mieuzet			4	13
6	(France) Gregory Deleu	4			13
7	(Belgium) Andre Vossius			5	11
8	(France) Bernard Perard	5			11
9	(France) Stephane Dufay			6	10
10	(France) Jean Francois Mioque			7	9

Vintage Motorcycle Sand Races World Cup
Pos.	Rider	LTO (France)	EDV (Argentina)	MGS (Portugal)	Points
1	(France) Sebastien Antony			1	25
2	(France) Felix Faure			2	20
3	(Portugal) Rodrigo Castro			3	16

=== Quads ===
Quad Sand Races World Cup
Pos.	Rider	LTO (France)	EDV (Argentina)	MGS (Portugal)	Points
1	(France) Michel Trannin	1	3	4	54
2	(France) Pablo Violet	3	2	3	52
3	(France) Keveen Rochereau	2		1	45
4	(France) Frederic Lefebvre	5	5	5	33
5	(Argentina) Pablo Leonel Vera	ret	1		25
6	(Spain) Ivan Solbas Cecilia	8	6	12	22
7	(Belgium) Oliver Vandendijck			2	20
8	(France) Axel Dutrie	ret	4	10	19
9	(France) Benoit Sebert	6		7	19
10	(Portugal) Paulo Fernandes	7		8	17
11	(Portugal) Nuno Goncalves	4		13	16
12	(France) Nathanaelle Abgrall			6	10
13	(Belgium) Sebastien Degrave			9	7
14	(Belgium) Glenn De Swarte			11	5
	(France) Thierry Vigier	ret			0
