= 2018 British Motocross Championship =

The 2018 British Motocross Championship was the 67th British Motocross Championship season. The championship was due to start on 11 March at Lyng, but this opening event was cancelled due to bad weather. It was rescheduled to act as the final round of the season on 14 October.

Graeme Irwin started the season as defending Champion in the MX1 class, having taken his first national title in the 2017 Championship. In the MX2 class, Ben Watson started the season as defending champion, but he did not compete in the series in 2018.

== MX1 ==
=== Calendar and Results ===
The championship was contested over 8 rounds.

Round	Date	Location	Race 1 Winner	Race 2 Winner	Round Winner
1	1 April	(England) Culham	(United Kingdom) Graeme Irwin	(Russia) Evgeny Bobryshev	(United Kingdom) Graeme Irwin
2	22 April	(England) Canada Heights	(United Kingdom) Jake Nicholls	(United Kingdom) Jake Nicholls	(United Kingdom) Jake Nicholls
3	6 May	(England) Blaxhall	(United Kingdom) Jake Nicholls	(United Kingdom) Jake Nicholls	(United Kingdom) Jake Nicholls
4	24 June	(Northern Ireland) Desertmartin	(United Kingdom) Tommy Searle	(United Kingdom) Tommy Searle	(United Kingdom) Tommy Searle
5	29 July	(Scotland) Duns	(Russia) Evgeny Bobryshev	Cancelled	(Russia) Evgeny Bobryshev
6	12 August	(England) Hawkstone Park	(United Kingdom) Jake Nicholls	(United Kingdom) Tommy Searle	(United Kingdom) Jake Nicholls
7	14 October	(England) Lyng	(United Kingdom) Tommy Searle	(United Kingdom) Tommy Searle	(United Kingdom) Tommy Searle

=== Participants ===
List of confirmed riders.

Team	Constructor	No	Rider	Rounds
Hitachi KTM UK	KTM	1	(United Kingdom) Graeme Irwin	1–6
Bells Racing with Moriwaki	Honda	2	(Japan) Yohei Kojima	6
Hydrogarden Honda	Honda	4	(United Kingdom) Harry Bradley	1–2
Phoenix Tools Apico Honda	Honda	6	(United Kingdom) Carlton Husband	All
Phoenix Tools Apico Honda	Honda	37	(Estonia) Gert Krestinov	All
Spectrum House Ltd	Honda	10	(United Kingdom) James Rutter	1–3
Apico Husqvarna	Husqvarna	11	(United Kingdom) Matt Burrows	All
Apico Husqvarna	Husqvarna	162	(Republic of Ireland) Stuart Edmonds	1–3
Lings Honda UK	Honda	12	(United Kingdom) George Grigg-Pettitt	1–3
SJP Moto	Husqvarna	14	(United Kingdom) Robert Davidson	1
SONC Concrete Cutting	Suzuki	15	(Republic of Ireland) Jim O'Neill	1
Norman Watt Motorcycles	KTM	17	(United Kingdom) Luke Smith	4–7
	Husqvarna	22	(United Kingdom) Richard McKeown	7
Dulson Racing RSS Yamaha	Yamaha	25	(United Kingdom) Jamie Law	1–5, 7
Dulson Racing RSS Yamaha	Yamaha	171	(United Kingdom) Zac Stealey	1–6
Bikesport Newcastle	Husqvarna	28	(United Kingdom) John Robson	5–6
Langmead Construction	Yamaha	33	(United Kingdom) Ashley Greedy	1–4
HTM Motorcycles	Husqvarna	35	(United Kingdom) Jordan McCaw	7
SJT Rakennus	KTM	41	(Estonia) Erki Kahro	1–3
Geartec Husqvarna	Husqvarna	44	(United Kingdom) Elliott Banks-Browne	All
Geartec Husqvarna	Husqvarna	141	(United Kingdom) Luke Burton	7
Geartec Husqvarna	Husqvarna	173	(United Kingdom) Luke Norris	1, 5–6
Geartec Husqvarna	Husqvarna	200	(United Kingdom) James Dunn	7
Geartec Husqvarna	Husqvarna	711	(United Kingdom) James Cottrell	7
Buildbase Honda Racing	Honda	45	(United Kingdom) Jake Nicholls	1–6
Buildbase Honda Racing	Honda	152	(Bulgaria) Petar Petrov	7
	KTM	46	(United Kingdom) Stuart Nesbitt	4
GH Motorcycles G&B Finch	Husqvarna	49	(United Kingdom) Luke Parker	All
GH Motorcycles G&B Finch	Husqvarna	190	(United Kingdom) Luke Benstead	3, 6–7
	Honda	56	(United Kingdom) Edward Briscoe	6
Planet Advanced Racing	Husqvarna	57	(United Kingdom) Tony Craig	1–4
Planet Advanced Racing	Husqvarna	714	(United Kingdom) Brad Todd	7
	KTM	59	(United Kingdom) James Hutchinson	2
Verde Substance KTM	KTM	60	(United Kingdom) Brad Anderson	1–3, 5–6
Powered by Evotech HR Kawasaki	Kawasaki	63	(United Kingdom) Jordan Divall	1–5
Dixon Honda Racing	Honda	65	(United Kingdom) Jacob Joyce	1, 7
	KTM	68	(United Kingdom) Joshua Bentley	3, 7
Herts MX UK	Husqvarna	74	(United Kingdom) Patrick Major	6
Herts MX UK	Honda	301	(United Kingdom) Shaun Southgate	1–6
Herts MX UK	Husqvarna	411	(United Kingdom) Declan Whittle	1–3, 5–7
Cab Screens Honda	Honda	95	(United Kingdom) Dan Thornhill	1–6
Cab Screens Honda	Honda	135	(United Kingdom) James Harrison	1–4
Bike-IT DRT Kawasaki	Kawasaki	100	(United Kingdom) Tommy Searle	2–7
	Honda	103	(United Kingdom) Max Broadbelt	1, 3
M Smith KTM	KTM	111	(Iceland) Eythor Reynisson	1–6
	KTM	114	(United Kingdom) Brad Cavill	3
Off-Road Southeast	Kawasaki	118	(United Kingdom) Kieran Clarke	2–3
Rob Hooper Racing Yamaha	Yamaha	119	(United Kingdom) Ryan Houghton	All
Rob Hooper Racing Yamaha	Yamaha	227	(United Kingdom) Kristian Whatley	1–3, 5
I-fly JK Yamaha	Yamaha	128	(Italy) Ivo Monticelli	1–6
DSC Cornwall Kawasaki	Kawasaki	152	(United Kingdom) Luke Sturgeon	1, 4
Fives Motorsport	KTM	157	(United Kingdom) Richard Bird	4
Dirt Wheelz UK	Kawasaki	166	(United Kingdom) Josh Taylor	2
HMC Sandbox Graphics	Husqvarna	188	(United Kingdom) Adam Day	3
Danger UK - Feridax	KTM	293	(United Kingdom) Ryan McLean	5
Site Sealants DCl KTM	KTM	295	(United Kingdom) Ross Rutherford	All
Team Colwyn Bay Honda	Honda	300	(United Kingdom) Charlie Hamlet	All
MB Racing Services	KTM	302	(South Africa) Brad Woodroffe	7
RAD RSS Yamaha	Yamaha	311	(United Kingdom) Aaron McCarroll	2, 5–7
RFX Crescent Yamaha	Yamaha	360	(United Kingdom) Nathan Dixon	1–5
RFX Crescent Yamaha	Yamaha	731	(United Kingdom) Jake Shipton	1, 3–4, 7
Acerbis KTM	KTM	447	(United Kingdom) Simon Booth	1–3, 5–7
	KTM	491	(United Kingdom) John Adamson	5
Apico Factory Racing	Honda	511	(United Kingdom) Steven Clarke	7
Stebbings Car Superstore	Husqvarna	553	(United Kingdom) Ryan Watts	7
Chambers Racing	Husqvarna	571	(United Kingdom) George Fountain	1
South Coast Racing Honda	Honda	691	(United Kingdom) Aidan Wigger	All
Lombard Express Suzuki	Suzuki	777	(Russia) Evgeny Bobryshev	All

=== Riders Championship ===
Pos	Rider	Bike	CUL (England)		CAN (England)		BLA (England)		DES (Northern Ireland)		DUN (Scotland)		HAW (England)		LYN (England)		Points
1	(Russia) Bobryshev	Suzuki	4	1	4	2	5	2	5	3	1	C	10	12	2	2	246
2	(United Kingdom) Nicholls	Honda	2	4	1	1	1	1	3	5	4	C	1	2			241
3	(United Kingdom) Searle	Kawasaki			5	7	2	Ret	1	1	6	C	3	1	1	1	212
4	(United Kingdom) Banks-Browne	Husqvarna	18	2	2	4	3	3	4	Ret	8	C	4	4	3	7	206
5	(United Kingdom) Irwin	KTM	1	3	11	3	4	7	2	4	Ret	C	2	3			189
6	(United Kingdom) Houghton	Yamaha	6	8	6	9	7	8	7	8	5	C	8	5	6	11	179
7	(Estonia) Krestinov	Honda	9	Ret	7	8	6	6	9	6	15	C	5	6	4	4	169
8	(Italy) Monticelli	Yamaha	Ret	5	3	5	12	4	6	2	2	C	Ret	Ret			138
9	(United Kingdom) Anderson	KTM	3	6	9	10	9	9			3	C	6	8			130
10	(United Kingdom) Thornhill	Honda	8	9	15	15	10	11	8	7	9	C	7	7			125
11	(United Kingdom) Law	Yamaha	19	12	13	12	18	15	11	9	12	C			11	9	90
12	(United Kingdom) Husband	Honda	Ret	17	16	24	24	12	10	20	10	C	9	9	13	8	86
13	(United Kingdom) Whatley	Yamaha	5	7	14	11	Ret	10			7	C					72
14	(United Kingdom) Rutherford	KTM	17	16	22	18	23	23	13	12	13	C	11	11	14	Ret	64
15	(Estonia) Kahro	KTM	11	13	8	Ret	11	5									57
16	(Republic of Ireland) Edmonds	Husqvarna	22	11	10	6	8	13									57
17	(United Kingdom) Harrison	Honda	7	10	12	13	14	Ret	Ret	DNS							49
18	(United Kingdom) Burrows	Husqvarna	Ret	18	Ret	17	17	19	18	19	14	C	12	14	Ret	15	47
19	(United Kingdom) Divall	Kawasaki	15	22	20	14	16	18	14	14	Ret	C					36
20	(Bulgaria) Petrov	Honda													7	3	34
21	(United Kingdom) Dixon	Yamaha	12	Ret	25	19	Ret	14	16	10	Ret	C					34
22	(United Kingdom) Clarke	Honda													5	6	31
23	(United Kingdom) Craig	Husqvarna	10	14	Ret	20	19	Ret	12	Ret							30
24	(United Kingdom) Southgate	Honda	25	Ret	17	16	20	21	22	17	19	C	15	13			30
25	(United Kingdom) Dunn	Husqvarna													9	5	28
26	(Iceland) Reynisson	KTM	Ret	26	23	Ret	21	Ret	23	11	24	C	14	10			28
27	(United Kingdom) Shipton	Yamaha	Ret	DNS			13	Ret	21	DNS					8	14	28
28	(United Kingdom) Parker	Husqvarna	16	Ret	24	22	Ret	22	20	18	17	C	21	16	15	17	28
29	(United Kingdom) Greedy	Yamaha	14	21	21	21	22	17	15	13							25
30	(United Kingdom) Benstead	Husqvarna					15	16					Ret	Ret	12	16	25
31	(United Kingdom) Smith	KTM							19	16	16	C	16	17	19	19	25
32	(United Kingdom) Burton	Husqvarna													10	10	22
33	(United Kingdom) Whittle	Husqvarna	20	15	18	23	Ret	DNS			Ret	C	Ret	18	16	Ret	18
34	(United Kingdom) McKeown	Husqvarna													17	12	13
35	(United Kingdom) McCarroll	Yamaha			19	27					21	C	19	15	23	18	13
36	(United Kingdom) Adamson	KTM									11	C					10
37	(United Kingdom) Bird	KTM							17	15							10
38	(United Kingdom) Bentley	KTM					28	25							20	13	9
39	(United Kingdom) Norris	Husqvarna	DNS	DNS							23	C	13	Ret			8
40	(United Kingdom) Davidson	Husqvarna	13	Ret													8
41	(Japan) Kojima	Honda											18	19			5
42	(United Kingdom) Briscoe	Honda											17	Ret			4
43	(United Kingdom) McLean	KTM									18	C					3
44	(United Kingdom) Joyce	Honda	DNS	DNS											18	21	3
45	(United Kingdom) Grigg-Pettitt	Honda	21	19	29	25	27	24									2
46	(United Kingdom) Hamlet	Honda	Ret	Ret	27	26	30	26	Ret	21	25	C	20	20	Ret	23	2
47	(South Africa) Woodroffe	KTM													22	20	1
48	(United Kingdom) Robson	Husqvarna									20	C	22	Ret			1
49	(United Kingdom) Cavill	KTM					26	20									1
50	(United Kingdom) Sturgeon	Kawasaki	23	20					Ret	Ret							1
	(United Kingdom) McCaw	Husqvarna													21	22	0
	(United Kingdom) Booth	KTM	26	25	31	30	31	29			26	C	24	21	24	24	0
	(United Kingdom) Stealey	Yamaha	24	24	28	31	25	27	24	22	22	C	23	Ret			0
	(United Kingdom) Wigger	Honda	31	29	Ret	32	32	31	26	23	27	C	Ret	Ret	27	25	0
	(United Kingdom) Rutter	Honda	29	23	26	Ret	Ret	DNS									0
	(United Kingdom) Nesbitt	KTM							25	Ret							0
	(United Kingdom) Watts	Husqvarna													25	Ret	0
	(United Kingdom) Todd	Husqvarna													26	Ret	0
	(United Kingdom) Bradley	Honda	28	27	30	28											0
	(Republic of Ireland) O'Neill	Suzuki	27	Ret													0
	(United Kingdom) Day	Husqvarna					29	28									0
	(United Kingdom) Broadbelt	Honda	30	28			Ret	30									0
	(United Kingdom) Taylor	Kawasaki			32	29											0
	(United Kingdom) Clarke	KTM			33	Ret	33	32									0
	(United Kingdom) Major	Husqvarna											Ret	Ret			0
	(United Kingdom) Fountain	Husqvarna	Ret	DNS													0
	(United Kingdom) Cottrell	Husqvarna													Ret	DNS	0
	(United Kingdom) Hutchinson	KTM			DNS	DNS											0
Pos	Rider	Bike	CUL (England)		CAN (England)		BLA (England)		DES (Northern Ireland)		DUN (Scotland)		HAW (England)		LYN (England)		Points

== MX2 ==
=== Calendar and Results ===
The championship was contested over 8 rounds.

Round	Date	Location	Race 1 Winner	Race 2 Winner	Round Winner
1	1 April	(England) Culham	(United Kingdom) Conrad Mewse	(United Kingdom) Conrad Mewse	(United Kingdom) Conrad Mewse
2	22 April	(England) Canada Heights	(United Kingdom) Conrad Mewse	(United Kingdom) Conrad Mewse	(United Kingdom) Conrad Mewse
3	6 May	(England) Blaxhall	(United Kingdom) Liam Knight	(United Kingdom) Conrad Mewse	(United Kingdom) Martin Barr
4	24 June	(Northern Ireland) Desertmartin	(United Kingdom) Conrad Mewse	(United Kingdom) Conrad Mewse	(United Kingdom) Conrad Mewse
5	29 July	(Scotland) Duns	(United Kingdom) Josh Gilbert	(United Kingdom) Jay Hague	(United Kingdom) Mel Pocock
6	12 August	(England) Hawkstone Park	(United Kingdom) Conrad Mewse	(United Kingdom) Mel Pocock	(United Kingdom) Mel Pocock
7	14 October	(England) Lyng	(New Zealand) Dylan Walsh	(United Kingdom) Conrad Mewse	(United Kingdom) Conrad Mewse

=== Participants ===
List of confirmed riders.

Team	Constructor	No	Rider	Rounds
Honda Adventure Centre	Honda	3	(United Kingdom) Josh Gilbert	All
IDS Bridgestone	Yamaha	4	(United Kingdom) Robert Yates	1–2, 5–7
Samson Roofing KTM	KTM	6	(United Kingdom) Chubbie Hammond	1–6
Team Green Kawasaki	Kawasaki	9	(United Kingdom) Lewis Hall	All
ASA Hitachi KTM	KTM	10	(United Kingdom) Michael Ellis	All
RFX Crescent Yamaha	Yamaha	15	(United Kingdom) Henry Williams	1–4
RFX Crescent Yamaha	Yamaha	101	(United Kingdom) Ben Clark	2–7
Norman Watt Kawasaki	Kawasaki	17	(United Kingdom) Luke Smith	1–3
Craig's Motorcycles	Husqvarna	19	(United Kingdom) Tom Neal	All
Craig's Motorcycles	Yamaha	115	(United Kingdom) Ashton Dickinson	All
Craig's Motorcycles	Honda	303	(United Kingdom) Jake Millward	All
Team Green GCM Kawasaki	Kawasaki	29	(United Kingdom) Keenan Hird	1–2
Rob Hooper Racing Yamaha	Yamaha	31	(United Kingdom) Robbie Dowson	1–6
SR75 Suzuki	Suzuki	32	(United Kingdom) Callum Mitchell	1–3, 5–7
SR75 Suzuki	Suzuki	99	(United Kingdom) Howard Wainwright	1–4, 6–7
Buildbase Honda Racing	Honda	33	(New Zealand) Josiah Natzke	1–3
Manchester MC Husqvarna	Husqvarna	38	(United Kingdom) Gavin Stevenson	All
Manchester MC Husqvarna	Husqvarna	148	(United Kingdom) Michael Eccles	1–4
	KTM	39	(United Kingdom) Sion Talbot	6
Apico Drysdale KTM	KTM	41	(United Kingdom) Alexander Brown	All
Vega Solutions KTM	KTM	48	(United Kingdom) Adam Collings	6–7
REVO Husqvarna UK	Husqvarna	50	(United Kingdom) Martin Barr	All
REVO Husqvarna UK	Husqvarna	53	(New Zealand) Dylan Walsh	7
REVO Husqvarna UK	Husqvarna	60	(United Kingdom) Dylan Woodcock	1–5
REVO Husqvarna UK	Husqvarna	119	(United Kingdom) Mel Pocock	All
Bike-it DRT Kawasaki	Kawasaki	57	(United States) Darian Sanayei	1
Bike-it DRT Kawasaki	Kawasaki	891	(Brazil) Gustavo Pessoa	5
HCR Yamaha	Yamaha	61	(United Kingdom) Tom Grimshaw	1–3, 7
Hitachi KTM UK	KTM	63	(United Kingdom) Oliver Benton	
Hitachi KTM UK	KTM	426	(United Kingdom) Conrad Mewse	All
G&G Ross Hardcore Racing	Yamaha	65	(United Kingdom) James Mackrel	1–2, 4–7
Putoline Planet Advanced Racing	Husqvarna	66	(United Kingdom) Lewis Tombs	All
Putoline Planet Advanced Racing	Husqvarna	72	(United Kingdom) Joe Cadwallader	1–3, 5
Putoline Planet Advanced Racing	Husqvarna	123	(United Kingdom) Rossi Beard	4
Putoline Planet Advanced Racing	Husqvarna	171	(United Kingdom) Dexter Douglas	1–2, 6
	Yamaha	75	(United Kingdom) Aaron Ongley	3
JTL Scaffolding	Kawasaki	77	(United Kingdom) Jay Hague	All
Husky Sport	Husqvarna	82	(United Kingdom) Charlie Cole	1–4, 7
I-fly JK Racing	Yamaha	97	(United Kingdom) Charlie Putnam	1–2, 4, 7
I-fly JK Racing	Yamaha	714	(United Kingdom) Brad Todd	3–6
Verde Substance KTM	KTM	98	(United Kingdom) Todd Kellett	All
	Honda	103	(United Kingdom) Max Broadbelt	7
	KTM	110	(United Kingdom) Jason Meara	4–5
Fountain Builders	Yamaha	111	(United Kingdom) Ben Putnam	All
	Husqvarna	114	(United Kingdom) Jordan Booker	6–7
RSR Plant Services KTM	KTM	122	(Republic of Ireland) Jake Sheridan	1, 4
Pope Racing	KTM	134	(United Kingdom) Liam Knight	All
Pope Racing	KTM	575	(United Kingdom) Taylor Hammal	All
M Smith KTM	KTM	180	(United Kingdom) Josh Spinks	All
Holeshot Greenstar Kawasaki	Kawasaki	184	(United Kingdom) James Carpenter	All
Gear4 Motorcycles KTM	KTM	199	(United Kingdom) Jake Edey	1, 3–4, 7
Chambers Racing	Husqvarna	300	(United Kingdom) Ben Franklin	1, 3, 5–7
SJP Moto	Husqvarna	331	(United Kingdom) Jordan Eccles	1, 4
	Yamaha	333	(United Kingdom) Josh Greedy	1–2
	KTM	337	(United Kingdom) Glenn McCormick	All
Honda Europe/CNC Doors	Honda	511	(United Kingdom) Steven Clarke	3, 6
JNSF Racing	KTM	981	(United Kingdom) Jordan Moxey	3

=== Riders Championship ===
Pos	Rider	Bike	CUL (England)		CAN (England)		BLA (England)		DES (Northern Ireland)		DUN (Scotland)		HAW (England)		LYN (England)		Points
1	(United Kingdom) Mewse	KTM	1	1	1	1	8	1	1	1	14	2	1	Ret	4	1	285
2	(United Kingdom) Gilbert	Honda	2	2	5	6	2	3	4	2	1	10	3	6	3	2	270
3	(United Kingdom) Pocock	Husqvarna	3	4	2	3	9	7	3	5	4	3	2	1	2	3	269
4	(United Kingdom) Knight	KTM	5	3	6	5	1	8	7	4	5	6	5	2	6	6	236
5	(United Kingdom) Barr	Husqvarna	7	Ret	3	2	3	2	2	17	3	4	12	5	8	4	218
6	(United Kingdom) Spinks	KTM	Ret	6	4	4	10	4	5	3	2	5	7	4	7	5	216
7	(United Kingdom) Brown	KTM	6	8	17	12	16	12	16	8	6	9	8	13	12	9	142
8	(United Kingdom) Tombs	Husqvarna	8	14	7	15	18	5	8	21	9	23	11	11	5	8	133
9	(United Kingdom) Kellett	KTM	9	Ret	Ret	13	5	16	9	7	12	7	4	10	19	Ret	121
10	(United Kingdom) Ellis	KTM	14	Ret	16	18	14	13	10	13	7	13	9	9	11	7	119
11	(United Kingdom) M. Eccles	Husqvarna	13	7	9	22	4	6	15	6							88
12	(United Kingdom) Dickinson	Yamaha	4	9	8	8	Ret	21	Ret	19	16	16	20	8	Ret	16	87
13	(United Kingdom) Todd	Yamaha					6	11	6	10	11	8	10	Ret			85
14	(United Kingdom) Hague	Husqvarna	19	13	Ret	11	7	15	Ret	Ret	Ret	1	Ret	12	20	Ret	75
15	(United Kingdom) Millward	Honda	Ret	11	10	9	20	18	19	Ret	13	18	Ret	15	13	10	75
16	(United Kingdom) Hammal	KTM	17	18	11	Ret	12	14	20	14	10	22	16	7	17	25	75
17	(United Kingdom) Clarke	Honda					11	9					6	3			57
18	(United Kingdom) McCormick	KTM	23	23	21	17	23	20	17	12	8	Ret	22	Ret	10	11	52
19	(United Kingdom) Carpenter	Kawasaki	18	15	13	Ret	31	Ret	12	20	15	Ret	17	14	25	15	50
20	(United Kingdom) Dowson	Yamaha	21	22	19	10	13	10	11	16	Ret	DNS	Ret	18			50
21	(New Zealand) Natzke	Honda	10	5	15	7	28	23									47
22	(United Kingdom) Neal	Husqvarna	11	Ret	12	Ret	33	17	21	15	Ret	14	Ret	Ret	15	20	43
23	(United Kingdom) Mackrel	Yamaha	28	19	23	Ret			24	22	17	11	21	16	16	13	34
24	(New Zealand) Walsh	Husqvarna													1	14	32
25	(United Kingdom) J. Eccles	Husqvarna	15	10					18	9							32
26	(United Kingdom) Stevenson	Husqvarna	Ret	12	Ret	14	21	Ret	26	18	21	17	14	Ret	24	Ret	30
27	(United Kingdom) Meara	KTM							13	11	18	15					27
28	(United Kingdom) Hall	Kawasaki	29	25	29	23	Ret	24	22	23	19	24	13	Ret	14	12	26
29	(United Kingdom) B. Putnam	Yamaha	Ret	Ret	14	16	19	25	Ret	24	Ret	Ret	15	23	Ret	Ret	20
30	(United Kingdom) Hammond	KTM	16	24	Ret	20	25	19	14	Ret	Ret	25	24	Ret			15
31	(United Kingdom) Douglas	Husqvarna	12	17	Ret	26							25	26			13
32	(United Kingdom) Booker	Husqvarna											Ret	22	9	Ret	12
33	(United Kingdom) Yates	Yamaha	Ret	DNS	Ret	Ret					20	12	19	21	DNS	DNS	12
34	(United Kingdom) Grimshaw	Yamaha	27	16	18	19	30	30							22	Ret	10
35	(United Kingdom) Franklin	Husqvarna	24	20			29	27			24	Ret	18	17	23	Ret	8
36	(United Kingdom) Woodcock	Husqvarna	20	Ret	22	Ret	15	Ret	23	Ret	DNS	DNS					7
37	(United Kingdom) Clark	Yamaha			25	21	24	22	Ret	26	23	19	23	19	27	18	7
38	(United Kingdom) Mitchell	Suzuki	DNQ	34	28	25	32	34			25	21	27	24	21	17	4
39	(United Kingdom) Wainwright	Suzuki	31	30	26	30	17	31	Ret	DNS			DNS	DNS	28	21	4
40	(United Kingdom) Cole	Husqvarna	30	29	27	28	26	29	25	DNS					18	24	3
41	(United Kingdom) C. Putnam	Yamaha	DNQ	33	20	24			28	25					29	19	3
42	(United Kingdom) Collings	KTM											Ret	20	26	23	1
43	(Brazil) Pessoa	Kawasaki									Ret	20					1
	(Republic of Ireland) Sheridan	KTM	22	21					29	29							0
	(United Kingdom) Edey	KTM	25	31			22	28	27	27					Ret	22	0
	(United Kingdom) Cadwallader	Husqvarna	DNQ	DNQ	31	31	35	Ret			22	Ret					0
	(United Kingdom) Hird	Kawasaki	26	28	24	Ret											0
	(United Kingdom) Talbot	KTM											26	25			0
	(United Kingdom) Williams	Yamaha	Ret	26	Ret	27	27	32	Ret	28							0
	(United Kingdom) Smith	Kawasaki	33	27	30	29	34	26									0
	(United Kingdom) Broadbelt	Honda													30	26	0
	(United Kingdom) Greedy	Yamaha	32	32	32	Ret											0
	(United Kingdom) Ongley	Yamaha					36	33									0
	(United Kingdom) Moxey	KTM					Ret	Ret									0
	(United Kingdom) Beard	Husqvarna							Ret	Ret							0
	(United States) Sanayei	Kawasaki	Ret	DNS													0
Pos	Rider	Bike	CUL (England)		CAN (England)		BLA (England)		DES (Northern Ireland)		DUN (Scotland)		HAW (England)		LYN (England)		Points
