= Enduro del Invierno =

FIM Sand Races World Championship
- Location: Mar del Plata, Argentina
- First race: 2023
- First SRWC race: 2025

Circuit information
- Surface: Sand
- Length: 4.2 km (2.6 mi)

The Enduro del Invierno (Winter Enduro) is an annual series of motorcycle and quad beach races held in August on the sands of Mar del Plata, General Pueyrredón Partido, Argentina. The races were first run in 2023 and in 2025 it became a round of the FIM Sand Races World Championship. The event is organised by EDV Entertainment, organizer of the Enduro del Verano (Summer Enduro) in Villa Gesell, supported by the Mar del Plata Municipal Tourism Board (Emtur) and the Municipality of General Pueyrredón. It is sanctioned by the Argentine Confederation of Motorcycling Sports (Camod) and the Fédération Internationale de Motocyclisme (FIM).

== History ==
In an attempt to increase tourism during the winter off-season, the city authorities made an agreement with the Asociación de Alta Velocidad (High Speed Association), who had run the Enduro del Atlántico in Necochea from 2016 to 2018, to run the event in Mar del Plata in 2022 with motorcycle and quad participants from Argentina. Despite legal actions by environmentalists to prevent the running of the event, the event named the EnduroPale was run and its success led the authorities to wish to run similar events in future years.

EDV Entertainment, who had been planning since 2016 to hold a Winter Enduro as counterpart to the Summer Enduro, thought Mar del Plata a suitable location. An initial agreement between EDV, Mar del Plata Municipal Tourism Board (Emtur) and the General Pueyrredón Partido was made to run international events in 2023, 2024 and 2025. For the 2023 event, overseen by the Argentine Confederation of Motorcycling Sports (Camod) and to be run on 25–27 August, EDV invited top riders from Europe and the Americas to attend and started negotiations with the FIM for it to be sanctioned as an international event from 2024 and the government nominated the event to included in the FIM Sand Racing World Championship. It had a total prize fund of $a 3,500,000. A 'fan fest' was set up near the course with food trucks and a stage for live entertainment. There were around 700 participants and it was estimated 390,000 spectators attended.

The 2024 edition, held 30 August to 1 September, was a qualifying round for the 2025 FIM Sand Races World Championship. It was attended by more international riders and works teams. The course was expanded to accommodate more participants and spectators and was made more technical and demanding. There were more than 500 participants and an estimated 315,000 spectators.

Included in the calendar for the FIM Sand Races World Championship, the 2025 event was scheduled for 29–31 August. A poor weather forecast for the 30 caused the organisers to reschedule the event to run on 29 and 30 only.

== Race format ==
The event takes place on a 4.2 km (2.6 mi) course on the sands of the Puerto Cardiel beach resort. The temporary course has various obstacles such as curves, counter-curves, waves and 'blasted' sections. It also features a 'Super Prime' section with a series of banked curves surrounded by grandstands. There is also a long straight near the waters edge. The course was designed by Lucas De La Fuente who designed the circuit in Villa La Angostura used for the Motocross World Championship and has won four World's Best Motocross Track awards.

There are 22 different categories in the event to suit riders of different ages and abilities. Heats for the various categories take place on the Saturday and finals on the Sunday.

== Winners ==
Enduro del Invierno Winners
Year	Motorcycles	Women's Motorcycles	Quads
2023	(Argentina) Joaquín Poli; Kawasaki	(Argentina) Guadalupe Alonso ?	(Argentina) Nahuel Coleur; Yamaha
2024	(France) Camille Chapeliere; Gas Gas	-	(Argentina) José Guerra ?
2025	(United Kingdom) Todd Kellett; Yamaha	(Belgium) Amandine Verstappen; Yamaha	(Argentina) Martín Gramigna (Note: Gramigna was not registered for the World Championship, not were many of the entrants (Quad racing being very popular in South America). The first registered racer home was Pablo Violet in 25th who was awarded full points towards the championship.)) ?
Souces:

== See also ==
- Enduropale du Touquet
- Bibione Sand Storm
- Monte Gordo Sand Race
- Weston Beach Race
