= 2017 British Motocross Championship =

The 2017 British Motocross Championship is the 66th British Motocross Championship season. Tommy Searle will start the season as the defending Champion in the MX1 class having taken his first national title in 2016. In the MX2 class, Adam Sterry starts the season as defending champion, but he will not compete in the series in 2017. For 2017, a new national 2-stroke championship will be contested at four rounds of the championship.

== MX1 ==
=== Calendar and Results ===
An 8-round calendar for the 2017 season was announced on 28 October 2016.

Round	Date	Location	Race 1 Winner	Race 2 Winner	Round Winner
1	12 March	(England) Culham	(United Kingdom) Jake Nicholls	(United Kingdom) Jake Nicholls	(United Kingdom) Jake Nicholls
2	9 April	(England) Lyng	(United Kingdom) Jake Nicholls	(Estonia) Gert Krestinov	(United Kingdom) Jake Nicholls
3	30 April	(England) Canada Heights	(United Kingdom) Elliott Banks-Browne	(Estonia) Gert Krestinov	(Estonia) Gert Krestinov
4	14 May	(England) Hawkstone Park	(United Kingdom) Graeme Irwin	(United Kingdom) Graeme Irwin	(United Kingdom) Graeme Irwin
5	18 June	(Northern Ireland) Desertmartin	(United Kingdom) Graeme Irwin	(United Kingdom) Graeme Irwin	(United Kingdom) Graeme Irwin
6	16 July	(England) Blaxhall	(United Kingdom) Graeme Irwin	(United Kingdom) Graeme Irwin	(United Kingdom) Graeme Irwin
7	30 July	(England) Preston Docks	(United Kingdom) Graeme Irwin	(United Kingdom) Graeme Irwin	(United Kingdom) Graeme Irwin
8	27 August	(England) Foxhill	(United Kingdom) Tommy Searle	(United Kingdom) Tommy Searle	(United Kingdom) Tommy Searle

=== Participants ===
List of confirmed riders.

Team	Constructor	No	Rider	Rounds
Lombard Express Suzuki	Suzuki	2	(Belgium) Kevin Wouts	8
FUS cps Husqvarna UK	Husqvarna	4	(United Kingdom) Luke Burton	1
	Husqvarna	4	(United Kingdom) Harry Bradley	7–8
Buildbase Honda Racing	Honda	5	(United Kingdom) Graeme Irwin	All
Phoenix Tools Honda	Honda	6	(United Kingdom) Carlton Husband	1–7
Phoenix Tools Honda	Honda	37	(Estonia) Gert Krestinov	All
Freestyle Bikes Yamaha	Yamaha	7	(United Kingdom) Mitchell Lewis	1–3
Smokevent KTM	KTM	8	(United Kingdom) Craig Browne	5
Spectrum House Ltd	Honda	10	(United Kingdom) James Rutter	All
Apico Husqvarna	Husqvarna	11	(United Kingdom) Matt Burrows	All
Apico Husqvarna	Husqvarna	25	(United Kingdom) Jamie Law	All
Apico Husqvarna	Husqvarna	227	(United Kingdom) Kristian Whatley	1–3
Lings Honda	Honda	12	(United Kingdom) George Grigg-Pettitt	1–3, 6–8
AJP Moto Husqvarna	Husqvarna	14	(United Kingdom) Robert Davidson	All
VMX Moto	KTM	15	(Republic of Ireland) Jim O'Neill	5, 7–8
Norman Watt Kawasaki	Kawasaki	16	(United Kingdom) John Meara	
Sissens Property Services	KTM	17	(South Africa) Damon Strydom	1, 3–6
Manchester MC Husqvarna	Husqvarna	23	(United Kingdom) JohnJoe Wright	1, 3–4
Manchester MC Husqvarna	Husqvarna	691	(United Kingdom) Aidan Wigger	1–5
Moffstar Racing	KTM	36	(United Kingdom) Matt Moffat	1–2
Geartec Husqvarna Racing	Husqvarna	44	(United Kingdom) Elliott Banks-Browne	All
Geartec Husqvarna Racing	Husqvarna	173	(United Kingdom) Luke Norris	6–8
Hitachi KTM UK	KTM	45	(United Kingdom) Jake Nicholls	1–2
Hitachi KTM UK	KTM	919	(United Kingdom) Ben Watson	8
Preston Docks Motocross	Kawasaki	48	(United Kingdom) Reece Desoer	1–3, 6–7
GH Motorcycles	Husqvarna	49	(United Kingdom) Luke Parker	1–4, 6–8
GH Motorcycles	Husqvarna	190	(United Kingdom) Luke Benstead	1–4, 6–8
Cheddar MX	KTM	54	(United Kingdom) Corey Hockey	3–4
Planet Suspension Husqvarna	Husqvarna	57	(United Kingdom) Tony Craig	2–7
Verde Sports Racing	KTM	60	(United Kingdom) Brad Anderson	All
Altherm JCR	Yamaha	61	(New Zealand) Josh Coppins	7
Dixon Honda Racing	Honda	69	(United Kingdom) Jacob Joyce	6
Herts MX	Husqvarna	74	(United Kingdom) Patrick Major	1–3
Herts MX	Husqvarna	188	(United Kingdom) Adam Day	6
Herts MX	Husqvarna	301	(United Kingdom) Shaun Southgate	1–6, 8
Team VMSX	Kawasaki	75	(United Kingdom) Ben Butler	
	KTM	88	(United Kingdom) Jordan Dunne	1, 8
	KTM	91	(United Kingdom) Ryan Adair	5
Red Bull KTM EnduroGP	KTM	91	(United Kingdom) Nathan Watson	7
Cab Screens Husqvarna	Husqvarna	95	(United Kingdom) Dan Thornhill	All
Cab Screens Husqvarna	Husqvarna	153	(United Kingdom) James Harrison	All
Monster Energy DRT Kawasaki	Kawasaki	100	(United Kingdom) Tommy Searle	8
G and S Yamaha	Yamaha	111	(United Kingdom) Ben Putnam	3
M Smith Worx Racing	Kawasaki	111	(Iceland) Eythor Reynisson	6–8
CH Construction Husqvarna	Husqvarna	118	(United Kingdom) Kieran Clarke	3
iFly JK Yamaha Racing	Yamaha	119	(United Kingdom) Ryan Houghton	All
	KTM	134	(United Kingdom) Liam Dixon	1
MVR-D Route 77 Energy Husqvarna	Husqvarna	151	(Estonia) Harri Kullas	1–2, 4, 7–8
D.S.C Cornwall Kawasaki	Kawasaki	152	(United Kingdom) Luke Sturgeon	8
D.S.C Cornwall Kawasaki	Kawasaki	681	(United Kingdom) Tommy Alba	1–2
ASA Honda	Honda	155	(United Kingdom) Jack Brunell	1
ASA Honda	Honda	214	(United Kingdom) Lewis Trickett	2
CCM Racing - Metcon TM	TM	162	(Republic of Ireland) Stuart Edmonds	2–8
JD Racing - Moto 33	KTM	166	(United Kingdom) Joshua Taylor	8
Apico CPS Husqvarna	Husqvarna	172	(United Kingdom) Robert Holyoake	1–2
One Twenty Motorsports	KTM	222	(United Kingdom) George Purchase	8
Meredith MX	Suzuki	274	(United Kingdom) Kieran Banks	1–2
Acerbis AK Feridax	Honda	293	(United Kingdom) Ryan McLean	
Site Sealants KTM	KTM	295	(United Kingdom) Ross Rutherford	1–5, 7–8
MB Racing	Husqvarna	302	(South Africa) Brad Woodroffe	6
	KTM	311	(United Kingdom) Aaron McCarroll	7
Danger UK	Husqvarna	411	(United Kingdom) Declan Whittle	1–4, 6–7
Service UK	KTM	447	(United Kingdom) Simon Booth	1–4, 6–8
WM Moto - Cumbria MX World	Husqvarna	511	(United Kingdom) Jay Lamb	All
Dyer & Butler Kawasaki	Kawasaki	685	(France) Steven Lenoir	1–4
RFX KTM	KTM	704	(United Kingdom) Ashley Wilde	1–3
Trevor Pope Kawasaki	Kawasaki	711	(United Kingdom) Sonny Oliver	
Crescent RHR Yamaha	Yamaha	731	(United Kingdom) Jake Shipton	1–5, 7–8
422 Racing	Kawasaki	818	(United Kingdom) Shaun Springer	3
VMX Moto	KTM	915	(Republic of Ireland) Jim O'Neill	6
	Suzuki	957	(United Kingdom) Jake Preston	7

=== Riders Championship ===
Pos	Rider	Bike	CUL (England)		LYN (England)		CAN (England)		HAW (England)		DES (Northern Ireland)		BLA (England)		PRD (England)		FOX (England)		Points
1	(United Kingdom) Irwin	Honda	4	3	2	2	4	5	1	1	1	1	1	1	1	1	5	DNS	332
2	(Estonia) Krestinov	Honda	11	8	7	1	2	1	13	3	3	3	6	2	7	3	4	3	286
3	(United Kingdom) Anderson	KTM	7	2	10	5	5	4	8	14	4	2	2	3	2	4	3	7	273
4	(United Kingdom) Davidson	Husqvarna	6	7	12	20	Ret	10	6	5	6	6	4	10	8	11	7	11	187
5	(United Kingdom) Banks-Browne	Husqvarna	3	Ret	4	13	1	3	4	Ret	2	Ret	Ret	DNS	Ret	DNS	2	2	175
6	(United Kingdom) Law	Husqvarna	9	9	8	15	8	9	12	6	9	15	15	5	11	9	12	10	174
7	(United Kingdom) Houghton	Yamaha	12	11	23	10	11	Ret	Ret	9	8	4	3	4	5	8	13	8	171
8	(United Kingdom) Harrison	Husqvarna	10	12	15	11	6	6	9	11	10	8	11	14	14	12	9	9	169
9	(France) Lenoir	Kawasaki	2	5	3	4	3	2	2	2									162
10	(United Kingdom) Thornhill	Husqvarna	Ret	13	13	23	12	23	11	8	7	9	5	8	4	10	10	Ret	143
11	(Estonia) Kullas	Husqvarna	Ret	4	6	8			3	4					3	5	DNS	DNS	120
12	(United Kingdom) Shipton	Yamaha	17	16	11	12	7	7	5	7	Ret	5			Ret	Ret	Ret	5	118
13	(Republic of Ireland) Edmonds	TM			18	9	10	8	10	12	5	Ret	Ret	7	10	7	Ret	DNS	114
14	(United Kingdom) Husband	Honda	Ret	14	21	27	9	17	7	10	11	10	Ret	6	9	6			111
15	(United Kingdom) Nicholls	KTM	1	1	1	3													95
16	(United Kingdom) Burrows	Husqvarna	15	15	16	14	21	12	16	19	15	12	10	12	12	17	15	Ret	94
17	(United Kingdom) Benstead	Husqvarna	14	20	17	17	15	13	15	16			9	13	Ret	DNS	19	14	70
18	(United Kingdom) Rutherford	KTM	Ret	22	Ret	19	13	Ret	14	15	12	11			13	15	16	13	69
19	(United Kingdom) Craig	Kawasaki			20	18	20	Ret	17	13	20	7	8	9	17	13			69
20	(United Kingdom) Whatley	Husqvarna	5	10	5	6	Ret	DNS											58
21	(United Kingdom) Wilde	KTM	8	6	9	7	17	Ret											58
22	(United Kingdom) Searle	Kawasaki															1	1	50
23	(United Kingdom) Norris	Husqvarna											7	Ret	Ret	DNS	11	6	39
24	(United Kingdom) Parker	Husqvarna	21	25	19	21	19	Ret	25	18			13	16	16	18	14	17	39
25	(United Kingdom) N. Watson	KTM													6	2			37
26	(United Kingdom) B. Watson	KTM															6	4	33
27	(Iceland) Reynisson	Kawasaki											14	11	15	Ret	27	12	32
28	(United Kingdom) Southgate	Husqvarna	26	21	24	29	25	15	19	Ret	17	13	Ret	DNS			17	15	30
29	(United Kingdom) Lamb	Husqvarna	20	Ret	Ret	24	24	Ret	18	17	13	14	Ret	Ret	18	Ret	DNS	DNS	26
30	(United Kingdom) Rutter	Honda	27	28	Ret	DNS	22	14	24	Ret	16	20	19	19	23	Ret	18	16	25
31	(Republic of Ireland) O'Neill	KTM									14	16	17	Ret	Ret	Ret	21	18	19
32	(United Kingdom) Lewis	Yamaha	Ret	Ret	DNS	DNS	14	11											17
33	(United Kingdom) Desoer	Kawasaki	23	17	Ret	DNS	DNS	DNS					21	15	21	14			17
34	(South Africa) Strydom	KTM	24	26			18	16	20	20	18	17	Ret	DNS					17
35	(Belgium) Wouts	Suzuki															8	Ret	13
36	(United Kingdom) Whittle	Husqvarna	Ret	27	25	26	26	19	22	21			Ret	17	19	16			13
37	(United Kingdom) Grigg-Pettitt	Honda	30	Ret	27	30	23	18					16	18	Ret	DNS	22	Ret	11
38	(United Kingdom) Burton	Husqvarna	13	19															10
39	(South Africa) Woodroffe	Husqvarna											12	Ret					9
40	(United Kingdom) Alba	Kawasaki	18	23	26	16													8
41	(United Kingdom) Trickett	Honda			14	25													7
42	(United Kingdom) Putnam	Yamaha					16	Ret											5
43	(United Kingdom) Brunell	Honda	16	24															5
44	(United Kingdom) Browne	KTM									19	18							5
45	(United Kingdom) Day	Husqvarna											18	20					4
46	(United Kingdom) Banks	Suzuki	25	18	Ret	31													3
47	(United Kingdom) Sturgeon	Kawasaki															20	19	3
48	(United Kingdom) McCarroll	KTM													20	19			3
49	(United Kingdom) Adair	KTM									21	19							2
50	(United Kingdom) Moffat	KTM	19	Ret	22	22													2
51	(United Kingdom) Taylor	KTM															24	20	1
52	(United Kingdom) Bradley	Husqvarna													22	20	23	21	1
53	(United Kingdom) Booth	KTM	28	30	28	33	28	22	26	24			20	22	24	21	26	22	1
54	(United Kingdom) Wright	Husqvarna	Ret	Ret			30	20	21	23									1
	(United Kingdom) Hockey	KTM					27	21	23	22									0
	(United Kingdom) Joyce	Honda											22	21					0
	(United Kingdom) Holyoake	Husqvarna	22	29	Ret	32													0
	(United Kingdom) Clarke	Husqvarna					29	24											0
	(United Kingdom) Purchase	KTM															25	Ret	0
	(United Kingdom) Wigger	Husqvarna	Ret	33	29	Ret	DNS	DNS	27	Ret	DNS	DNS							0
	(United Kingdom) Dunne	KTM	29	32													28	Ret	0
	(United Kingdom) Major	Husqvarna	Ret	31	DSQ	28	DNS	DNS											0
	(United Kingdom) Preston	Suzuki													Ret	Ret			0
	(United Kingdom) Springer	Kawasaki					Ret	DNS											0
	(New Zealand) Coppins	Yamaha													Ret	DNS			0
	(United Kingdom) Dixon	KTM	DNS	DNS															0
Pos	Rider	Bike	CUL (England)		LYN (England)		CAN (England)		HAW (England)		DES (Northern Ireland)		BLA (England)		PRD (England)		FOX (England)		Points

Colour	Result
Gold	Winner
Silver	Second place
Bronze	Third place
Green	Points finish
Blue	Non-points finish
Blue	Non-classified finish (NC)
Purple	Retired (Ret)
Red	Did not qualify (DNQ)
Red	Did not pre-qualify (DNPQ)
Black	Disqualified (DSQ)
White	Did not start (DNS)
White	Withdrew (WD)
White	Race cancelled (C)
Blank	Did not practice (DNP)
Blank	Did not arrive (DNA)
Blank	Excluded (EX)

== MX2 ==
=== Calendar and Results ===
An 8-round calendar for the 2017 season was announced on 28 October 2016.

Round	Date	Location	Race 1 Winner	Race 2 Winner	Round Winner
1	12 March	(England) Culham	(United Kingdom) Ben Watson	(United Kingdom) Ben Watson	(United Kingdom) Ben Watson
2	9 April	(England) Lyng	(Estonia) Harri Kullas	(Estonia) Harri Kullas	(Estonia) Harri Kullas
3	30 April	(England) Canada Heights	(Estonia) Harri Kullas	(United Kingdom) Ben Watson	(Estonia) Harri Kullas
4	14 May	(England) Hawkstone Park	(United Kingdom) Ben Watson	(New Zealand) Josiah Natzke	(United Kingdom) Ben Watson
5	18 June	(Northern Ireland) Desertmartin	(United Kingdom) Martin Barr	(United Kingdom) Ben Watson	(United Kingdom) Martin Barr
6	16 July	(England) Blaxhall	(New Zealand) Josiah Natzke	(United Kingdom) Todd Kellett	(United Kingdom) Todd Kellett
7	30 July	(England) Preston Docks	(United Kingdom) Ben Watson	(United States) Darian Sanayei	(United States) Darian Sanayei
8	27 August	(England) Foxhill	(United States) Darian Sanayei	(United States) Darian Sanayei	(United States) Darian Sanayei

=== Participants ===
List of confirmed riders.

Team	Constructor	No	Rider	Rounds
Lombard Express Suzuki	Suzuki	2	(Belgium) Kevin Wouts	1–2
Lombard Express Suzuki	Suzuki	25	(France) Florent Richier	8
Lombard Express Suzuki	Suzuki	272	(South Africa) Neville Bradshaw	4–7
Dave Thorpe Honda Off Road Centre	Honda	3	(United Kingdom) Josh Gilbert	All
Dave Thorpe Honda Off Road Centre	Honda	71	(United Kingdom) Loukas Maggio	1–2
IDS Yamaha	Yamaha	4	(United Kingdom) Robert Yates	2–4, 6
Buildbase Honda Racing	Honda	5	(United Kingdom) Graeme Irwin	8
Buildbase Honda Racing	Honda	50	(United Kingdom) Martin Barr	All
iFly JK Yamaha Racing	Yamaha	6	(Australia) Jay Wilson	1–2
iFly JK Yamaha Racing	Yamaha	48	(Italy) Tommaso Isdraele	3
iFly JK Yamaha Racing	Yamaha	48	(Sweden) Ken Bengtson	7
iFly JK Yamaha Racing	Yamaha	371	(Italy) Manuel Iacopi	5
iFly JK Yamaha Racing	Yamaha	481	(Slovenia) Peter Irt	4
P&H Motorcycles	KTM	10	(United Kingdom) Michael Ellis	1–5
Nitro Kawasaki	Kawasaki	11	(Iceland) Eythor Reynisson	5
Apex Geartec KTM	KTM	12	(United Kingdom) Ray Rowson	4
Colwyn Bay Feehily MX KTM	KTM	14	(United Kingdom) Charlie Hamlet	1–2, 5, 7
RFX KTM	KTM	15	(United Kingdom) Henry Williams	1, 6–7
RFX KTM	KTM	360	(United Kingdom) Nathan Dixon	1–3, 6–8
Craigs Motorcycles Yamaha	Yamaha	15	(United Kingdom) Ashton Dickinson	3
Moto 4 Husqvarna UK	Husqvarna	17	(United Kingdom) Luke Smith	1, 3–4, 7–8
SJP Moto	Husqvarna	19	(United Kingdom) Tom Neal	All
SJP Moto	Husqvarna	171	(United Kingdom) Dexter Douglas	1–2, 4–5
Crescent KTM	KTM	24	(United Kingdom) Liam Garland	
Bikesport Newcastle KTM	KTM	28	(United Kingdom) John Robson	1–4
Graham Charlton Motorcycles	Yamaha	31	(United Kingdom) Robbie Dowson	1–3, 5–8
Hitachi KTM UK	KTM	33	(New Zealand) Josiah Natzke	All
Hitachi KTM UK	KTM	98	(United Kingdom) Todd Kellett	6–8
Hitachi KTM UK	KTM	631	(United Kingdom) Oliver Benton	1, 3–5, 7
Hitachi KTM UK	KTM	919	(United Kingdom) Ben Watson	1–7
SaddMX	Yamaha	38	(United Kingdom) Gavin Stevenson	All
Apico Husqvarna	Husqvarna	41	(United Kingdom) Alexander Brown	1–3, 5, 7–8
MVR-D Route 77 Energy Husqvarna	Husqvarna	49	(United Kingdom) Callum Green	4
MVR-D Route 77 Energy Husqvarna	Husqvarna	151	(Estonia) Harri Kullas	All
Monster Energy DRT Kawasaki	Kawasaki	57	(United States) Darian Sanayei	7–8
Team Green UK - Monster Energy Kawasaki	Kawasaki	60	(United Kingdom) Dylan Woodcock	1–2, 4–8
Apico Factory Racing	Yamaha	61	(United Kingdom) Tom Grimshaw	6
Powered by Evotech - BOS Suspension	KTM	63	(United Kingdom) Jordan Divall	All
	KTM	65	(United Kingdom) James Mackrel	5
Lings Husqvarna	Husqvarna	66	(United Kingdom) Lewis Tombs	All
JTL - Plant Suspension Husqvarna	Husqvarna	77	(United Kingdom) Jay Hague	1–7
St Blazey MX - SJ Hodder	Husqvarna	98	(United Kingdom) Todd Kellett	1–5
HMC Honda UK	Honda	101	(United Kingdom) Ben Clarke	6
G and S Yamaha	Yamaha	111	(United Kingdom) Ben Putnam	1–2, 4
Craigs Motorcycles Yamaha	Yamaha	115	(United Kingdom) Ashton Dickinson	6–7
Revo Husqvarna UK	Husqvarna	119	(United Kingdom) Mel Pocock	All
Revo Husqvarna UK	Husqvarna	184	(United Kingdom) James Carpenter	1–2
RSR Plant Services	KTM	122	(Republic of Ireland) Jake Sheridan	1–7
Hobbs Racing Kawasaki	Kawasaki	134	(United Kingdom) Liam Knight	All
Hobbs Racing Kawasaki	Kawasaki	575	(United Kingdom) Taylor Hammal	All
	Kawasaki	148	(United Kingdom) Michael Eccles	1–4
Planet Advanced Racing Suspension	Husqvarna	148	(United Kingdom) Michael Eccles	5–8
Planet Advanced Racing Suspension	Husqvarna	714	(United Kingdom) Brad Todd	1–2, 4–8
Geartec Husqvarna Racing	Husqvarna	173	(United Kingdom) Luke Norris	1–5
Geartec Husqvarna Racing	Husqvarna	981	(United Kingdom) Jordan Moxey	6
Manchester MC Husqvarna	Husqvarna	180	(United Kingdom) Josh Spinks	1–3
SPS Suspension Services	KTM	180	(United Kingdom) Josh Spinks	4–8
CCM Racing	TM	195	(Republic of Ireland) Dylan Stynes	3
		200	(United Kingdom) James Dunn	
Valley Developments	Yamaha	300	(United Kingdom) Ben Franklin	3–4, 6
Verde Sports Racing	KTM	303	(United Kingdom) Jake Millward	All
	Husqvarna	331	(United Kingdom) Jordan Eccles	1–7
Agnew Recovery - Watt Motorcycles	KTM	337	(United Kingdom) Glenn McCormick	1–6, 8
Cab Screens Husqvarna	Husqvarna	661	(United Kingdom) Josh Coleman	1–4, 6–8
MX Autos - Watson Engineering	KTM	751	(United Kingdom) Joe Jeffries	1
Norman Watt Motorcycles KTM	KTM	771	(United Kingdom) Jason Meara	1–2
Samson Roofing	Husqvarna	874	(United Kingdom) Ryan Hammond	All

=== Riders Championship ===
Pos	Rider	Bike	CUL (England)		LYN (England)		CAN (England)		HAW (England)		DES (Northern Ireland)		BLA (England)		PRD (England)		FOX (England)		Points
1	(United Kingdom) Watson	KTM	1	1	2	2	5	1	1	2	3	1	7	2	1	2			310
2	(United Kingdom) Barr	Honda	14	2	3	4	9	3	2	4	1	2	6	3	4	4	Ret	DNS	257
3	(Estonia) Kullas	Husqvarna	2	8	1	1	1	2	Ret	3	11	13	8	18	7	3	8	6	248
4	(United Kingdom) Pocock	Husqvarna	4	10	4	3	2	11	4	12	Ret	5	2	5	10	6	2	4	246
5	(United Kingdom) Kellett	Husqvarna	9	11	8	8	4	13	3	5	4	4							241
5	(United Kingdom) Kellett	KTM											4	1	19	7	5	3	241
6	(New Zealand) Natzke	KTM	3	Ret	12	27	3	4	5	1	17	Ret	1	9	3	5	4	2	225
7	(United Kingdom) Gilbert	Honda	12	6	7	15	8	6	12	7	7	9	12	8	14	9	6	5	193
8	(United Kingdom) Tombs	Husqvarna	8	9	6	6	7	8	10	21	10	11	3	7	12	12	11	7	190
9	(United Kingdom) M. Eccles	Kawasaki	6	Ret	19	12	6	5	8	6									188
9	(United Kingdom) M. Eccles	Husqvarna									2	3	9	Ret	5	8	13	9	188
10	(United Kingdom) Todd	Husqvarna	5	5	5	5			9	17	8	6	5	10	16	11	15	14	163
11	(United Kingdom) Spinks	Husqvarna	11	12	32	17	13	10											154
11	(United Kingdom) Spinks	KTM							11	10	5	7	14	4	Ret	10	9	8	154
12	(United Kingdom) Millward	KTM	7	7	13	21	Ret	9	7	9	6	8	11	11	9	Ret	Ret	11	144
13	(United Kingdom) Knight	Kawasaki	10	Ret	14	9	17	7	6	8	13	10	17	6	Ret	14	10	10	143
14	(United States) Sanayei	Kawasaki													2	1	1	1	97
15	(United Kingdom) Divall	KTM	Ret	3	10	7	10	16	16	24	Ret	20	15	16	18	17	12	Ret	94
16	(United Kingdom) Norris	Husqvarna	20	4	9	13	Ret	15	13	11	9	16							80
17	(United Kingdom) Stevenson	Yamaha	13	16	15	11	27	18	24	13	Ret	14	19	20	8	15	Ret	DNS	69
18	(United Kingdom) Woodcock	Kawasaki	Ret	15	18	14			26	Ret	15	19	Ret	17	13	Ret	14	13	51
19	(South Africa) Bradshaw	Suzuki							14	14	12	12	10	Ret	Ret	13			51
20	(United Kingdom) Brown	Husqvarna	Ret	Ret	27	31	16	19			14	15			6	19	18	16	45
21	(United Kingdom) Neal	Husqvarna	18	Ret	21	22	15	20	15	Ret	16	18	20	Ret	17	20	17	Ret	34
22	(United Kingdom) Ellis	KTM	16	18	26	28	12	17	22	15	20	17							32
23	(United Kingdom) Hague	Husqvarna	23	Ret	25	24	14	12	DNS	DNS	23	Ret	Ret	Ret	11	16			31
24	(United Kingdom) Dowson	Yamaha	Ret	Ret	30	20	11	14			25	Ret	22	15	22	Ret	23	19	26
25	(United Kingdom) Hammond	Husqvarna	28	20	28	Ret	21	25	31	Ret	22	Ret	Ret	12	21	Ret	16	12	24
26	(United Kingdom) Hammal	Kawasaki	21	21	22	25	18	Ret	20	16	21	21	16	19	20	Ret	19	17	23
27	(United Kingdom) McCormick	KTM	17	28	24	32	25	26	19	22	Ret	Ret	13	14			22	20	22
28	(Belgium) Wouts	Suzuki	24	DNS	11	10													21
29	(France) Richier	Suzuki															3	Ret	20
30	(United Kingdom) J. Eccles	Husqvarna	15	17	29	18	19	Ret	23	19	19	Ret	Ret	DNS	Ret	Ret			19
31	(United Kingdom) Dickinson	Yamaha					20	Ret					Ret	13	15	21			15
32	(United Kingdom) Meara	KTM	22	13	16	19													15
33	(United Kingdom) Irwin	Honda															7	DNS	14
34	(Australia) Wilson	Yamaha	19	Ret	17	16													11
35	(Republic of Ireland) Sheridan	KTM	26	23	33	33	29	27	30	23	18	24	18	21	23	18			9
36	(United Kingdom) Carpenter	Husqvarna	Ret	14	23	Ret													7
37	(United Kingdom) Putnam	Yamaha	Ret	22	Ret	Ret			17	18									7
38	(United Kingdom) Dixon	KTM	27	Ret	Ret	23	24	23					24	Ret	Ret	Ret	Ret	15	6
39	(United Kingdom) Coleman	Husqvarna	Ret	26	31	29	28	29	32	28			Ret	Ret	25	22	21	18	3
40	(Slovenia) Irt	Yamaha							18	Ret									3
41	(United Kingdom) Douglas	Husqvarna	Ret	19	20	26			25	27	Ret	25							3
42	(United Kingdom) Smith	Husqvarna	Ret	30			23	21	27	20					28	24	20	Ret	2
	(United Kingdom) Yates	Yamaha			35	30	22	24	Ret	31			21	22					0
	(United Kingdom) Rowson	KTM							21	25									0
	(United Kingdom) Franklin	Yamaha					26	22	29	26			23	Ret					0
	(Italy) Iacopi	Yamaha									26	22							0
	(United Kingdom) Williams	KTM	30	27									25	23	24	23			0
	(United Kingdom) Benton	KTM	Ret	25			Ret	DNS	28	29	Ret	23			26	Ret			0
	(United Kingdom) Clarke	Honda											27	24					0
	(Iceland) Reynisson	Kawasaki									24	Ret							0
	(United Kingdom) Jeffries	KTM	DNQ	24															0
	(United Kingdom) Grimshaw	Yamaha											26	25					0
	(United Kingdom) Hamlet	KTM	DNQ	29	Ret	34					Ret	Ret			27	25			0
	(United Kingdom) Maggio	Honda	25	Ret	Ret	Ret													0
	(Italy) Isdraele	Yamaha					30	28											0
	(United Kingdom) Moxey	Husqvarna											28	Ret					0
	(United Kingdom) Robson	KTM	29	Ret	34	Ret	Ret	DNS	Ret	Ret									0
	(United Kingdom) Green	Husqvarna							33	30									0
	(United Kingdom) Mackrel	KTM									Ret	Ret							0
	(Sweden) Bengtson	Yamaha													Ret	Ret			0
	(Republic of Ireland) Stynes	TM					Ret	DNS											0
Pos	Rider	Bike	CUL (England)		LYN (England)		CAN (England)		HAW (England)		DES (Northern Ireland)		BLA (England)		PRD (England)		FOX (England)		Points

Colour	Result
Gold	Winner
Silver	Second place
Bronze	Third place
Green	Points finish
Blue	Non-points finish
Blue	Non-classified finish (NC)
Purple	Retired (Ret)
Red	Did not qualify (DNQ)
Red	Did not pre-qualify (DNPQ)
Black	Disqualified (DSQ)
White	Did not start (DNS)
White	Withdrew (WD)
White	Race cancelled (C)
Blank	Did not practice (DNP)
Blank	Did not arrive (DNA)
Blank	Excluded (EX)
