= Monte Gordo Sand Race =

FIM Sand Races World Cup
- Location: Monte Gordo, Portugal; 37.180°N 7.453°W
- First race: 2023
- Previous names: Monte Gordo Sand Experience

Circuit information
- Surface: Sand
- Length: 6 km (3.7 mi)

The Monte Gordo Sand Race, originally the Monte Gordo Sand Experience, is an annual series of motorcycle and quad beach races held in November on the sands of Monte Gordo, Algarve, Portugal. The inaugural race in 2023 was a round of the newly created FIM Sand Races World Cup and is a permanent fixture on the Championship calendar. The race is organised by the Automóvel Club de Portugal (ACP), promoted by the Vila Real de Santo António City Council under the aegis of the Portuguese Motorcycling Federation (FMP) and the Fédération Internationale de Motocyclisme (FIM).

== Race format ==
The races take place on a man-made temporary course on Monte Gordo beach. Originally run over a 5 km (3.1 mi) course, it was extended to 6 km (3.7 mi) in 2024.

Races take place over two heats, the overall winner is determined by adding the times of the two heats together. The main motorcycle race has a 1.5 hour heat on the Saturday and a 1 hour heat on the Sunday. Quad heats last for 1 hour and 3/4 hour. Heats for juniors and vintage are 45 minutes and 30 minutes.

In 2025, the Yamaha/Mini Monte Gordo Sand Race Trophy was introduced for riders from 8 to 16 years old. This included two categories each for motorcycles and quads.

== Environmental ==
An Environmental Valorization Plan is in place to minimise the environmental impact of the event, which includes monitoring sand and water quality. The 2024 running became the first FIM KISS (Keep it Shiny and Sustainable) sustainability event in sand racing. 575 trees and 2,000 native shrubs were planted to offset the events carbon footprint.

== Results ==
=== Motorcycles ===
Year	Motorcycles		Women Motorcycles		Veterans Motorcycles		Vintage Motorcycles		Sources
Year	Heats	Overall	Heats	Overall	Heats	Overall	Heats	Overall	Sources
2023	(Belgium) Yentel Martens; Honda	(Belgium) Yentel Martens; Honda	(Belgium) Amandine Verstappen; Yamaha	(Belgium) Amandine Verstappen; Yamaha	(France) Christophe Brucker; KTM	(France) Arnaud Besnier; Honda	(Portugal) David Megre; Kawasaki	(France) Sebastien Antony; Yamaha	
2023	(Belgium) Yentel Martens; Honda	(Belgium) Yentel Martens; Honda	(Belgium) Amandine Verstappen; Yamaha	(Belgium) Amandine Verstappen; Yamaha	(France) Dominique Mieuzet; Honda	(France) Arnaud Besnier; Honda	(France) Sebastien Antony; Yamaha	(France) Sebastien Antony; Yamaha	
2024	(United Kingdom) Todd Kellett; Yamaha	(United Kingdom) Todd Kellett; Yamaha	(Belgium) Amandine Verstappen; Yamaha	(Belgium) Amandine Verstappen; Yamaha	(France) Gregory Deleu Yamaha	(France) Dominique Mieuzet; Honda	(France) Felix Faure; Honda	(France) Felix Faure; Honda	
2024	(United Kingdom) Todd Kellett; Yamaha	(United Kingdom) Todd Kellett; Yamaha	(Belgium) Amandine Verstappen; Yamaha	(Belgium) Amandine Verstappen; Yamaha	(France) Dominique Mieuzet; Honda	(France) Dominique Mieuzet; Honda	(France) Felix Faure; Honda	(France) Felix Faure; Honda	
2025	(United Kingdom) Todd Kellett; Yamaha	(Belgium) Cyril Genot; Honda	(Belgium) Amandine Verstappen; Yamaha	(Belgium) Amandine Verstappen; Yamaha	(France) Damien Prevot; Yamaha	(France) Damien Prevot; Yamaha	(France) Sebastien Antony; KTM	(France) Freddy Seguin; Honda	
2025	(Belgium) Cyril Genot; Honda	(Belgium) Cyril Genot; Honda	(France) Mathilde Denis; Fantic	(Belgium) Amandine Verstappen; Yamaha	(France) Alexis Van De Woestine; Gas Gas	(France) Damien Prevot; Yamaha	(France) Freddy Seguin; Honda	(France) Freddy Seguin; Honda	

=== Quads ===
Year	Quads		Women Quads		Veterans Quads		Sources
Year	Heats	Overall	Heats	Overall	Heats	Overall	Sources
2023	(France) Keveen Rochereau; Honda	(France) Keveen Rochereau; Honda	(France) Nathanaelle Abgrall; Yamaha	(France) Nathanaelle Abgrall; Yamaha	(France) Axel Dutrie; Yamaha	(France) Benoit Sebert; Yamaha	
2023	(France) Keveen Rochereau; Honda	(France) Keveen Rochereau; Honda	(France) Nathanaelle Abgrall; Yamaha	(France) Nathanaelle Abgrall; Yamaha	(France) Benoit Sebert; Yamaha	(France) Benoit Sebert; Yamaha	
2024	(France) Keveen Rochereau; Honda	(France) Keveen Rochereau; Honda	(France) Nathanaelle Abgrall; Yamaha	(France) Nathanaelle Abgrall; Yamaha	(France) Axel Dutrie; Yamaha	(France) Axel Dutrie; Yamaha	
2024	(France) Keveen Rochereau; Honda	(France) Keveen Rochereau; Honda	(France) Nathanaelle Abgrall; Yamaha	(France) Nathanaelle Abgrall; Yamaha	(France) Axel Dutrie; Yamaha	(France) Axel Dutrie; Yamaha	
2025	(United Kingdom) Harry Walker; Laeger's	(United Kingdom) Harry Walker; Laeger's			(Belgium) Dirk Schelfhout; Honda	(Belgium) Dirk Schelfhout; Honda	
2025	(United Kingdom) Harry Walker; Laeger's	(United Kingdom) Harry Walker; Laeger's			(Belgium) Dirk Schelfhout; Honda	(Belgium) Dirk Schelfhout; Honda	

=== Juniors ===
Year	Junior Motorcycles 1		Junior Motorcycles 2		Junior Quads		Sources
Year	Heats	Overall	Heats	Overall	Heats	Overall	Sources
2023	(France) Matheo Gerat; KTM	(France) Matheo Gerat; KTM	(Belgium) Tias Callens; Yamaha	(France) Sarah Leroy; Kawasaki	(Argentina) Vito Ferrari; KTM	(Argentina) Vito Ferrari; KTM	
2023	(France) Matheo Gerat; KTM	(France) Matheo Gerat; KTM	(France) Sarah Leroy; Kawasaki	(France) Sarah Leroy; Kawasaki	(Argentina) Vito Ferrari; KTM	(Argentina) Vito Ferrari; KTM	
2024	(France) Matheo Gerat; Yamaha	(France) Matheo Gerat; Yamaha	(France) Paolo Maschio; Kawasaki	(France) Paolo Maschio; Kawasaki	(France) Alois Waloszek; Yamaha	(France) Alois Waloszek; Yamaha	
2024	(France) Matheo Gerat; Yamaha	(France) Matheo Gerat; Yamaha	(France) Paolo Maschio; Kawasaki	(France) Paolo Maschio; Kawasaki	(France) Alois Waloszek; Yamaha	(France) Alois Waloszek; Yamaha	
2025			(France) Evan Demeester; Honda	(France) Evan Demeester; Honda			
2025			(Netherlands) Dean Gregoire; KTM	(France) Evan Demeester; Honda			

== See also ==
- Bibione Sand Storm
- Enduro del Invierno
- Enduro del Verano
- Enduropale du Touquet
- Weston Beach Race
