= Todd Kellett =

British motorcycle racer

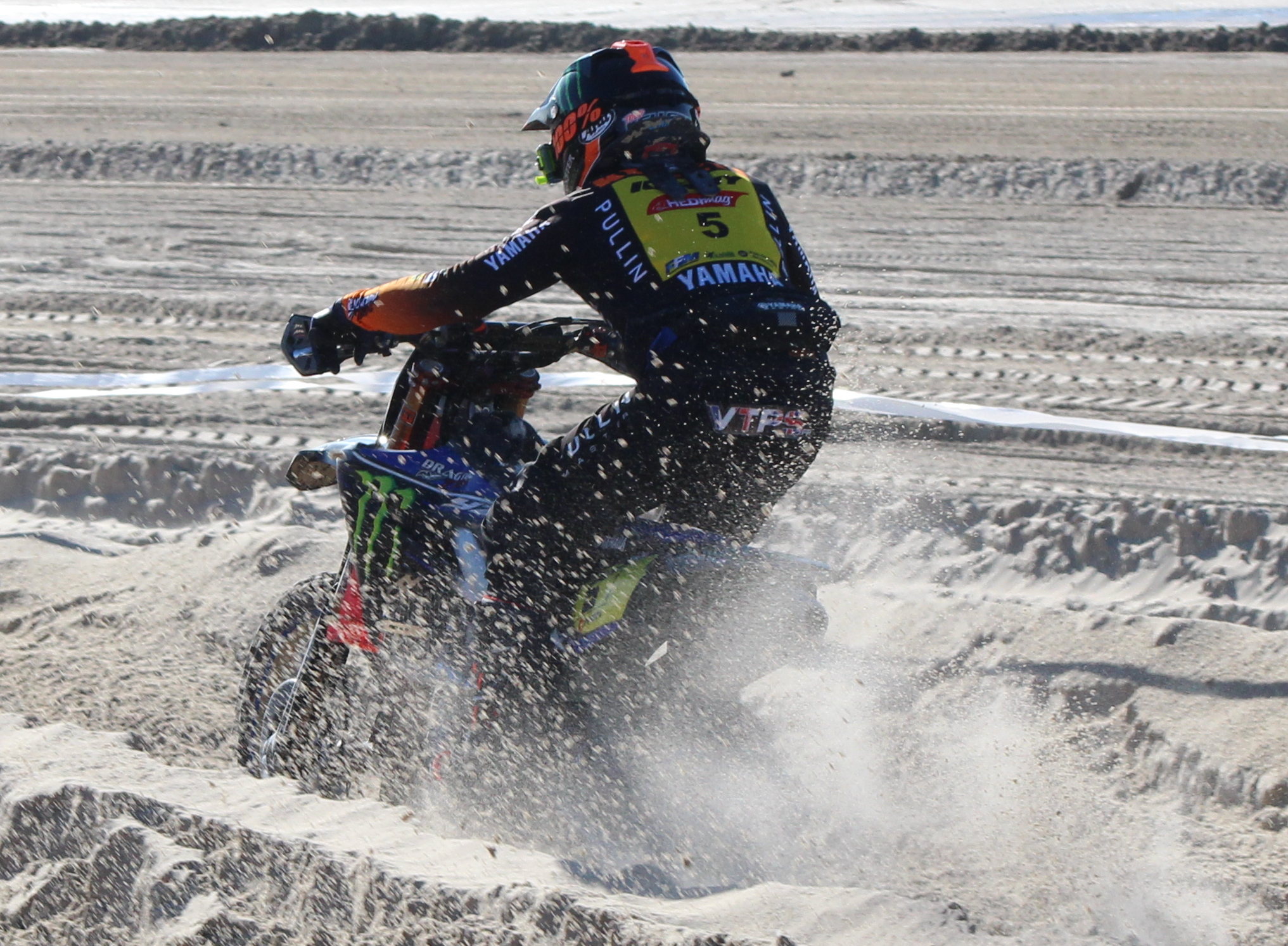
- Todd Kellett in action at the 2022 Enduropale
- Born: 2 April 1997 (age 29); Langport, Somerset, England
- Occupation: Sand racer
- Current series: FIM Sand Races World Championship; French Sand Racing Championship
- Previous series: FIM Sand Races World Cup
- Current team: Team Honda Motoblouz SR Motul
- Previous teams: Monster Energy Drag'on Tek Yamaha, Hitachi Husqvarna UK
- Website: www.toddkellett.com

Championship titles
- FIM Sand Races World Championship (2025); FIM Sand Races World Cup (2023, 2024); French Sand Racing Championship (2022, 2024, 2025)
Statistics
Sand Races World Championship
Active years	2025-
Championships	1 (2025)
Current team	Monster Energy Drag'on Tek Yamaha
Last season (2025)	1st (5 wins/126 pts)
Starts / Wins / Podiums / Points; 6 / 5 / 6 / 133
Sand Races World Cup
Active years	2023 - 2024
Championships	2 (2023, 2024)
Team(s)	Monster Energy Drag'on Tek Yamaha
Last season (2024)	1st (6 wins/150 pts)
Starts / Wins / Podiums / Points; 9 / 8 / 9 / 220
French Sand Racing Championship (CFS)
Active years	2018-
Championships	3 (2022/2023, 2024/2025, 2025/2026)
Last season (2025/2026)	1st (5 wins/3,000 pts)
Starts / Wins / Podiums / Points; 36 / 20 / 29 / 16,717

Todd Kellett (born 2 April 1997) is a British professional off-road motorcycle racer. Kellett specialises in the discipline of beach racing, where he won the inaugural FIM Sand Races World Championship, held in 2025.

Kellett has taken several wins in some of the most well-known beach races, including the Enduropale du Touquet and 7 times winner of the Weston Beach Race. During his 2024 world cup winning season, Kellett won all rounds of the season to take a clean sweep on his way to the title.

Prior to focussing on beach racing, Kellett raced motocross in the European and British championships. He finished third in the EMX2T class of the 2019 European Motocross Championship, where he won the round held in Russia.

== Career ==
Kellett began his career racing Motocross, progressing through the junior ranks in Great Britain, as well as racing in Europe. After racing the event the previous season and finishing fifth, Kellett took victory in the 2016 Weston Beach Race, besting former motocross grand prix winner Tanel Leok in the process. Kellett competed in the EMX250 class of the 2017 European Motocross Championship, finishing thirteenth in the final standings, which included a fourth place in the first race at the fourth round. Starting the season on a St Blazey-backed Husqvarna, Kellett switched to the Hitachi KTM UK team mid-season, which saw him take the overall win in the MX2 class at the sixth round of the 2017 British Motocross Championship. After finishing fifth in the British championship standings, Kellett would successfully defend his Weston Beach Race victory at the 2017 edition.

Staying in the class for the 2018 European Motocross Championship, Kellett finished twenty-sixth in the standings, recording one top-ten race finish. In the 2018 British Motocross Championship, he would finish ninth in the MX2 standings, whilst at the Weston Beach race he became only the third rider in history to win the event three consecutive times. Kellett switched to competed on a two-stroke 250cc Yamaha in 2019, enabling him to compete in the EMX2T class of the 2019 European Motocross Championship. He was able to win take the overall win at the fourth round in Russia, eventually ending the championship in third.

Beach Racing

Following his final season competing in the EMX classes, Kellett focussed on the discipline of Beach Racing, competing in the French Sand Racing Championship (CFS). He finished as runner-up in the series in 2019 and 2021, taking three wins across the two seasons. In addition, Kellett took his fourth Weston Beach Race victory in 2021. Kellett was able to take his first French Sand Championship title in the 2023 season, which coincided with him winning the famous Enduropale du Touquet event for the first time. The 2023 Enduropale event doubled as the first round of the inaugural FIM Sand Races World Cup, where Kellett was crowned champion after the completion of the three round series.

Kellett successfully defended his French Sand Championship title through the winter of 2023–2024, winning the Enduropale du Touquet for the second consecutive year. Due to his exploits in sand racing, Kellett received a call up to compete for the factory Yamaha team at the Sardinian round of the 2024 FIM Motocross World Championship. He successfully defended his FIM Sand Races World Cup title, winning every round in the expanded six round series. In early 2026, Kellett became only the second rider in the history of the event to win the Enduropale du Touquet for four consecutive editions. The win crowned him both the 2025/6 French Sand Champion and 2025 FIM Sand Races World Champion.

In April 2026, it was announced that Kellet had joined the Honda SR Motoblouz team after many years of riding for Yamaha.

== Racing record ==
Year	Results
2008	Winner 65cc class Weston Beach Race
2011	Winner 85cc class Weston Beach Race
2012	2nd 85cc class Red Bull Elite Youth Cup Championship
2013	4th Weston Beach Race
2014	British Arenacross Champion (Note: Arenacross is a scaled down version of motocross that is run on temporary short and technical courses within stadiums and arenas.); 10th Weston Beach Race
2015	5th Weston Beach Race
2016	10th Maxxis British Motocross Championship (Note: The British Motocross Championship was sponsored by Maxxis Tyres at the time.); Winner UK Patchquick Trophy (Note: The Patchquick Trophy is a long established annual motocross race held near Exeter, Devon, England.); Winner Weston Beach Race
2017	5th Maxxis British Motocross Championship; 13th European EMX250 Championship; 5th Ronde des sables de Loon-Plage; Winner Weston Beach Race
2018	Winner Weston Beach Race; 5th RedBull Knock Out (Note: The RedBull Knock Out is a beach race that takes place annually in Scheveningen, The Netherlands); Winner Weston Beach Race; Winner Skegness Beach Race
2019	3rd Ronde des sables de Loon-Plage; 2nd Endurance des Lagunes de Saint-Léger de Balson; Winner Ronde des sables d'Hossegor-Capbreton; Winner Skegness Beach Race; 3rd FIM Europe EMX2T Championship (winner in Orlyonok, Russia)
2020	2nd Gurp TT à Grayan-et-l’Hôpital; 5th Enduropale du Touquet; 2nd Ronde des sables de Loon-Plage; 2nd French Sand Racing Championship (CFS) 2019/2020 (1 win); 6th Pro XC1 (10th overall) Wild Boar GNCC (Note: The Wild Boar is a cross county event held at the Rodman Plantation, Palatka, Florida US.)
2021	15th French Elite Motocross Championship; Winner Weston Beach Race; Winner Weymouth Beach Motocross
2022	2nd French Sand Racing Championship (CFS) 2021/2022 (2 wins); Winner Weston Beach Race
2023	Winner FIM Sand Races World Cup (2 wins); Winner French Sand Racing Championship (CFS) 2022/2023 (5 wins); Winner Enduropale du Touquet; Winner Weston Beach Race
2024	Winner FIM Sand Races World Cup (6 wins); 8th French Sand Racing Championship (CFS) 2023/2024 (2 wins); Winner Enduropale du Touquet
2025	Winner French Sand Racing Championship (CFS) 2024/2025 (5 wins); Winner Enduropale du Touquet; Winner Weston Beach Race
2026	Winner French Sand Racing Championship (CFS) 2025/2026 (5 wins); Winner 2025 FIM Sand Races World Championship (5 wins); Winner Enduropale du Touquet

=== Complete British Motocross Championship results ===
(key)

Year	Class	Bike	1		2			3			4			5			6			7			8			Pos.	Pts
2015	MX2	Husqvarna	HIL1	HIL1	LYN1	LYN2	LYN3	CAN1; 13	CAN2; 38	CAN3; 40	HAW1 ?	HAW2 ?	HAW3 ?	BLA1; 24	BLA2; 21	BLA3; 26	FOX1 ?	FOX2; 10	FOX3 ?	PRE1; 34	PRE2; 21	PRE3; 29	FAT1; 25	FAT2; 24	FAT3; 23	33rd	22
2016	MX2	Husqvarna	LYN1	LYN2	CAN1		CAN2	HAW1; 10		HAW2; 9	DES; 13		DES; 5	LEU1; 6		LEU2; 12	BLA1		BLA2	PRE1; 17		PRE2; 19	FOX1; 9		FOX2; 6	10th	127
2017	MX2	Husqvarna	CUL1; 9	CUL2; 11	LYN1; 8		LYN2; 8	CAN1; 4		CAN2; 13	HAW1; 3		HAW2; 5	DES1; 4		DES2; 4										5th	241
2017	MX2	KTM															BLA1; 4		BLA2; 1	PRD1; 19		PRD2; 7	FOX1; 5		FOX2; 3	5th	241
2018	MX2	KTM	CUL1; 9	CUL2; Ret	CAN1; Ret		CAN2; 13	BLA1; 5		BLA2; 16	DES1; 9		DES2; 7	DUN1; 12		DUN2; 7	HAW1; 4		HAW2; 10	LYN1; 19		LYN2; Ret				9th	121
2019	MX1	Yamaha	FAT1; Ret	FAT2; Ret	LYN1		LYN2	CAN1		CAN2	BLA1		BLA2	DES1; 13		DES2; Ret	HAW1		HAW2	FOX1		FOX2	LAN1		LAN2	43rd	8
2022	MX2	Yamaha	CUL1	CUL2	FOX1		FOX2	LYN1		LYN1	CAN1		CAN2	BLA1		BLA2	FAT1; 4		FAT2; 7	SKE1		SKE2	LAN1		LAN1	28th	32
2024	MX2	Yamaha	LYN1	LYN2	CAN		CAN	BLA1; 7		BLA2; C	HAW1		HAW2	SCH1		SCH2	PRE1		PRE2							27	14

=== Complete European Motocross Championship results ===
(key)

Year	Class	Bike	1		2		3		4		5		6		7		8		9		10		11		Pos.	Pts
2017	EMX250	Husqvarna	TRE1; 21	TRE2; 8	NED1; 11	NED2; 18	LAT1; 15	LAT2; 9	FRA1; 4	FRA2; 13	RUS1	RUS2	ITA1; 10	ITA2; Ret	POR1; 10	POR2; Ret	SUI1; 9	SUI2; 8	FRA1; 17	FRA2; DNS					13th	121
2018	EMX250	KTM	ESP1; DNQ	ESP2; DNQ	POR1; 25	POR2; Ret	RUS1; 19	RUS2; 29	LAT1; 27	LAT2; 26	GBR1; 15	GBR2; Ret	FRA1; 21	FRA2; 11	ITA1; 13	ITA2; 20	BEL1; 18	BEL2; 26	SUI1	SUI2	BUL1	BUL2	NED1; 7	NED2; 13	26th	52
2019	EMX2T	Yamaha	GBR1; 4	GBR2; 6	ITA1; 2	ITA2; 18	POR1; 2	POR2; 6	RUS1; 1	RUS2; 2	LAT1; 3	LAT2; 5	ITA1; 4	ITA2; 17	TUR	TUR									3rd	200

=== Complete French Sand Racing Championship (CFS) results ===
(key)

Year	Bike	1	2	3	4	5	6	7	Pos.	Pts
2018/2019	Yamaha	BER	LOO	BAL; 24	HOS; 7	GRA; 8	TOU		47th	272
2019/2020	Yamaha	BER; 4	LOO; 5	BAL; 2	HOS; 1	GRA; 2	TOU; 5		2nd	755
2021/2022	Yamaha	BER; 2	LOO; 1	MAG; 2	HOS; 4	GRA; 1	TOU; 2		2nd	3,330
2022/2023	Yamaha	LOO; 2	MAG; 1	BAL; 1	HOS; 1	GRA; 1	TOU; 1		1st	3,550
2023/2024	Yamaha	BER	MAG	LOO	HOS; 2	BAL; 3	GRA; 1	TOU; 1	8th	2,260
2024/2025	Yamaha	BER; 1	LOO; 2	HOS; 1	BAL; 1	GRA; 1	TOU; 1		1st	3,550
2025/2026	Yamaha	BER; 1	LOO; 1	HOS; 1	BAL; 1	GRA; C (Note: The race was red flagged after 20 minutes racing following a serious accident. The organisers decided to cancel the race. Kellet was in the lead at the time the race was stopped.)	TOU; 1		1st	3,000
2026/2027	Honda	BER; 1	LOO; 2	HOS	BAL	GRA	TOU		2nd*	1,150*

* Season still in progress

Key to venues: BAL - Endurance des Lagunes de Saint-Léger de Balson, BER - Beach-Cross de Berck, GRA - GURP TT de Grayan-et-l'Hôpital, HOS - Ronde des Sables Hossegor-Capbreton, LOO - Ronde des Sables de Loon Plage, MAG - Bud Sand Race of Magescq TOU - Enduropale du Touquet

=== Complete FIM Sand Races World Cup results ===
(key)

Year	Bike	1	2	3	4	5	6	Pos.	Pts
2023	Yamaha	TOU; 1	VER; 1	MON; 2				1st	70
2024	Yamaha	TOU; 1	VER; 1	LOO; 1	BIB; 1	MON; 1	HOS; 1	1st	150

Key to venues: BIB - Bibione Sand Storm, HOS - Ronde des Sables Hossegor-Capbreton, LOO - Ronde des Sables de Loon Plage, MON - Monte Gordo Sand Experience, TOU - Enduropale du Touquet, VER - Enduro del Verano

=== Complete FIM Sand Races World Championship results ===
(key)

Year	Bike	1	2	3	4	5	6	Pos.	Pts
2025	Yamaha	TOU; 1	INV; 1	BIB; 1	HOS; 1	MON; 18	TOU; 1	1st	126
2026-2027	Honda	MOR; 9	BIB; 4	LOO; 2	MON	TOU		4th*	40*

* Season still in progress

Key to venues: BIB - Bibione Sand Storm, LOO - Ronde des Sables de Loon Plage HOS - Ronde des Sables Hossegor-Capbreton, INV - Enduro del Invierno, MON - Monte Gordo Sand Experience, MOR - Morocco Sand Race TOU - Enduropale du Touquet
