= Bibione Sand Storm =

FIM Sand Races World Championship
- Location: Bibione, Italy; 45.6334792°N 13.0600505°E
- Corporate sponsor: Acerbis
- First race: 2024
- Most wins (driver): (United Kingdom) Todd Kellett (2); (Belgium) Amandine Verstappen (2)

Circuit information
- Surface: Sand
- Length: 7 km (4.3 mi)

The Bibione Sand Storm is an annual series of motorcycle and quad beach races held on the Piazzale Zenith sands of Bibione, San Michele al Tagliamento, Italy. It was first run in 2024 as a round of the FIM Sand Races World Cup. Organised by the moto club BB1 it is sanctioned by the Federazione Motociclistica Italiana (FMI) and the Fédération Internationale de Motocyclisme (FIM) and sponsored by the Italian sporting goods manufacturer Acerbis and the Veneto region.

== History ==
The FIM wanted to expand the World Sand Races Cup calendar for 2024, including a round in Italy. The local and regional authorities were keen to host the event to increase tourism and Bibione was chosen. The event took place on 1-3 November 2024. As well as the racing other forms of entertainment were included in the weekend. Vanni Oddera and the Daboot crew (Massimo Bianconcini and Francesco Buetto) put on exhibitions of freestyle motocross and as part of the Mototerapia initiative, children and young people with disabilities were able to experience being on dirt bike. A food and entertainment area was set up by the Piazzale Zenith including a giant LED wall where live feeds from the race are shown. About 50,000 spectators attended and there were over 100 participants.

For 2025 the World Cup had been upgraded by the FIM to a full World Championship. The Bibione round was brought forward a week to 24-26 October to avoid clashes with other motorcycle events. The format of the weekend followed that of the previous year. Over 80,000 spectators attended.

Bibione is scheduled to host the second round of the 2026–2027 FIM Sand Races World Championship on 23-25 October 2026.

== Race format ==
The 6 km (3.7 mi) temporary circuit built on the broad sands of Bibione is supervised by six-time World Enduro Champion Giovanni Sala and based on his design. It originally had a fast 2.5 km (1.6 mi) starting straight before heading into a slower section with technical curves, potholes, dunes, canals and jumps. For 2025 the course layout was revised to make it more challenging. This increased the length to nearly 7 km (4.3 mi) including a 3 km (1.9 mi) straight where the top riders can touch 160 km/h (99 mph).

The categories and classes of the FIM Sand Races World Cup are included in the event:

- Motos, Women's Moto, Veteran Motos, Junior Motos and Vintage Motos
- Quads, Women's Quads, Veteran Quads and Junior Quads

In addition, riders with a national licence may compete in the international motorcycle races in a separate class for the Sand Storm Open.

Races are completed over two heats, one on Saturday and the second on Sunday. Heats last 90 minutes for motorcycles, 60 for quads and 45 minutes for juniors and vintage classes. Overall winners are determined by adding the times of the two heats together.

There is also a night race that takes place on an illuminated 1 km (0.62 mi) track in front of Piazzale Zenith. Teams from motorcycle clubs compete in heats lasting 8 minutes plus one laps. The heats have a Le Mans style start.

== Winners ==
Motorcycle winners
Year	Motos	Motos Women	Motos Veterans	Motos Junior	Vintage	Source
2024	(United Kingdom) Todd Kellett; Yamaha	(Belgium) Amandine Verstappen; Yamaha	(France) Gregory Deleu; Fantic	(France) Paolo Maschio; Kawasaki	(France) Felix Faure; Honda	
2025	(United Kingdom) Todd Kellett; Yamaha	(Belgium) Amandine Verstappen; Yamaha	(France) Alexis van de Woestyne; Honda	(France) Evan Demeester; Honda	(France) Freddy Seguin; Honda	

Quad winners
Year	Quads	Quads Women	Quads Veterans	Quads Junior	Source
2024	(France) Keveen Rochereau; Honda	(France) Nathanaelle Abgrall; Yamaha	(France) Axel Dutrie; Yamaha	(France) Alois Waloszek; Yamaha	
2025	(Belgium) Dirk Schelfhout; Honda	-	(Belgium) Dirk Schelfhout; Honda	-	

== See also ==
- Enduro del Invierno
- Enduro del Verano
- Enduropale du Touquet
- Monte Gordo Sand Race
- Weston Beach Race
