= Enduro del Verano =

FIM Sand Races World Cup
- Location: Villa Gesell, Argentina; 37°15′20″S 56°58′5″W
- First race: 1992
- First SRWC race: 2025
- Most wins (rider): Motos: Luis Pighetti (7); Quads: Javier Altieri (6)

Circuit information
- Surface: Sand
- Length: 12.5 km (7.8 mi)

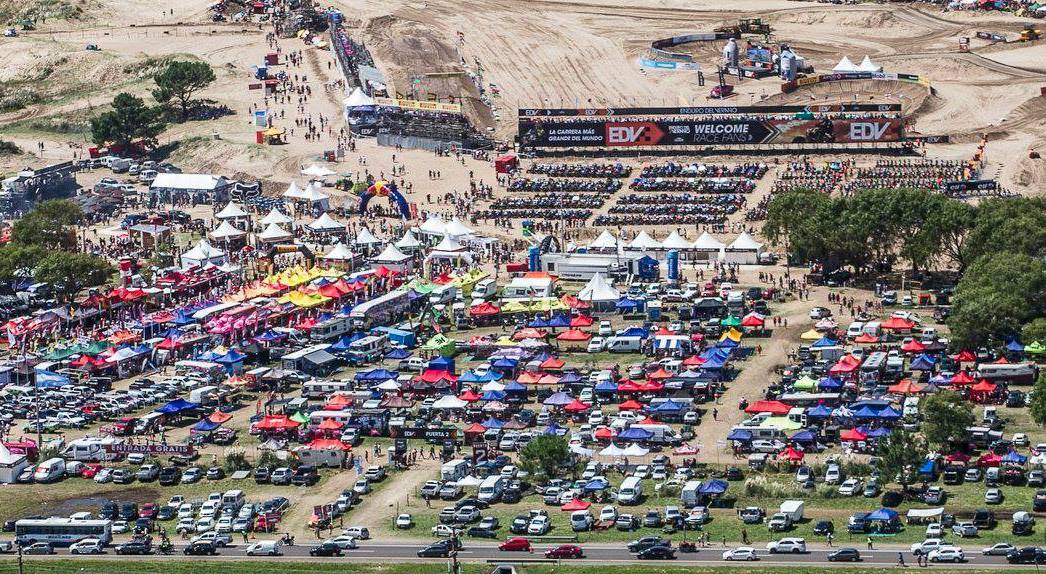
Enduro del Verano in 2018

The Enduro del Verano (Summer Enduro) is an annual series of motorcycle and quad races held in February on the dunes of Villa Gesell, Argentina. It is the most important race of its type in Latin America and is one of the largest worldwide. The event was first run in 1992 and in 2023 and 2024 was a round of the FIM Sand Races World Cup. It is run by EDV Entertainment and sanctioned by the Argentine Confederation of Motorcycling Sports (Camod) and the Fédération Internationale de Motocyclisme (FIM).

== History ==
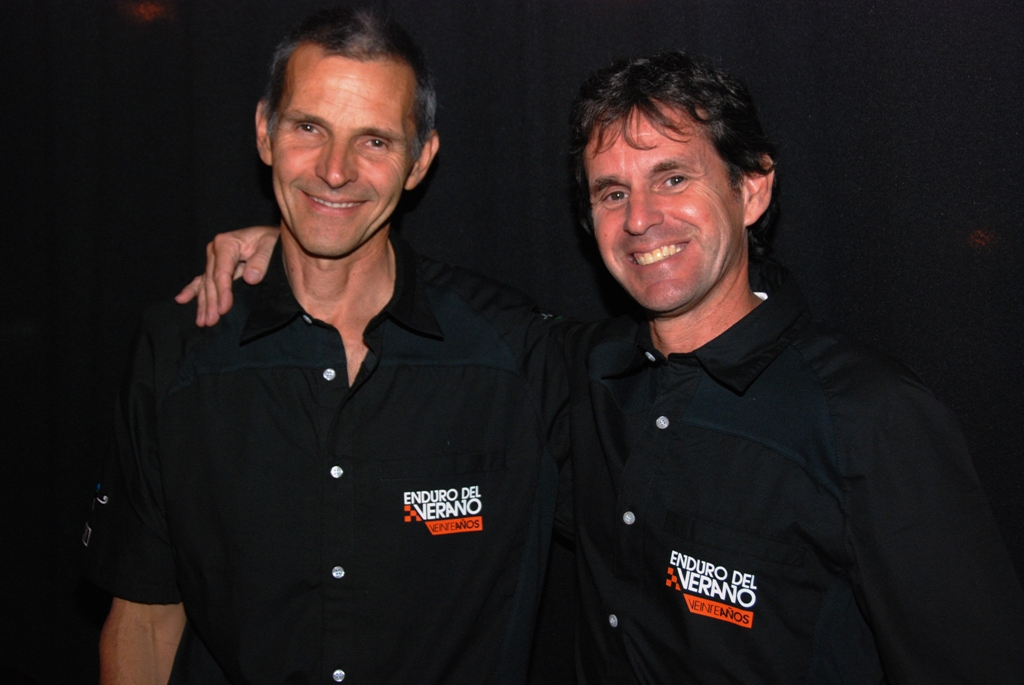
Charlie 'Boy' Allue and Victor Gilabert, founders of the Enduro del Verano

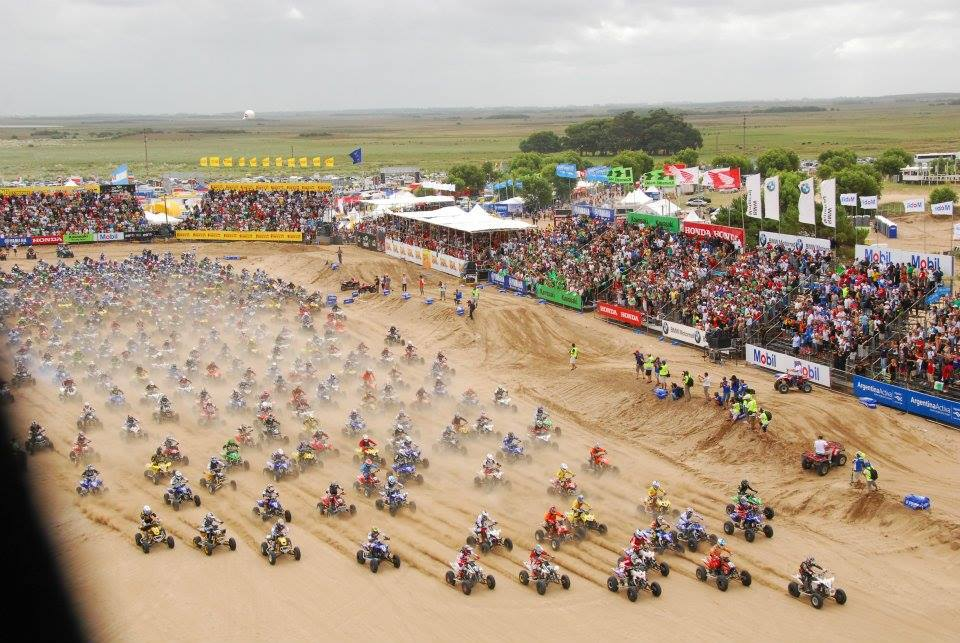
Start of the quad race

Brainchild of Charlie 'Boy' Allue and Victor Gilabert, the first race took place in Pinamar in 1992 in which over 250 motorcycles took part and more than 1,500 spectators attended. From 1998 the races started to attract international participants. The event was subsequently held at various locations until 2006 when it was held at Villa Gesell and continues to be held there.

The competition was not held in 2002 and came close to being cancelled in 2007 when provincial security agencies refused authorisation for it. It went ahead under the personal responsibility of the mayor Luis Baldo. Various supercross categories were added that year creating the Supercross del Verano (Summer Supercross) within the overall event.

A world record for the largest quad race was set in 2013 and was included in the Guinness Book of World Records. The following year it became an 'Eco Enduro' with strong measures in place to protect the venue.

In 2017 the Moto Beach Classic was added to the schedule for motorcycles manufactured between 1970 and 1982.

American Chad Wiennen became the first non-Argentinian to win the quad race in 2019.

The event was cancelled in 2021 and 2022 as a consequence of the COVID-19 pandemic. It became a round of the inaugural FIM World Sand Races Cup in 2023 and was also on the World Cup calendar in 2024.

1,173 registered participants, including 624 on motorcycles, competed in 2025, the highest number to date.

== Race format ==
The 12.5 km (7.8 mi) circuit is situated amongst the dunes of Villa Gesell, some of which are 45 m (148 ft) high, and includes a section along the shore 40 m (130 ft) from the water.

A sprint race takes place on the Saturday and the main race on the Sunday. There are many categories and classes catering for motorcycles and quads including supercross and enduro type events.

Entry for spectators is free but there is a requirement to donate a non-perishable food item or a school supply for children's homes and social service organisations.

== Winners ==
Winners 1992-2001
Year	Motorcycles		Quads
Year	2T PRO	4T PRO	Quads
1992	(Argentina) Andres Junco; Suzuki	-	(Argentina) Juan Tesei; Honda
1993	(Argentina) Andres Junco; Suzuki	-	(Argentina) Esteban Segat; Honda
1994	(Argentina) Fabio Dobal; Honda	-	(Argentina) Esteban Segat; Honda
1995	Not run		
1996	(Argentina) Luis Pighetti; Honda	-	(Argentina) Alejandro Patronelli; Yamaha
1997	(Argentina) Luis Pighetti; Honda	(Argentina) Lucas Rovatti; Yamaha	(Argentina) Alejandro Patronelli; Yamaha
1998	(Argentina) Luis Pighetti; Honda	(Argentina) Demián Villar; Yamaha	(Argentina) Osvaldo Baio; Yamaha
1999	(Argentina) Luis Pighetti; Honda	(Sweden) Anders Erickson; Husqvarna	(Argentina) Alejandro Patronelli; Yamaha
2000	(Finland) Jani Laaksonen; Gas Gas	(Sweden) Anders Erickson; Husqvarna	(Argentina) Mauro De Francesco; Yamaha
2001	(Argentina) Luis Pighetti; Yamaha	Anders Erickson; Husqvarna	(Argentina) Jorge Santamarina; Honda

Winners 2002-2011
Year	Motorcycles				Quads
Year	2T PRO	4T PRO	2T/4T PRO	PRO	Quads
2002	Not run				
2003	(Argentina) Javier Pizzolito; Honda	(Argentina) Luis Pighetti; Yamaha	-	-	(Argentina) Jorge Santamarina; Honda
2004	(Argentina) Luis Correa; Yamaha	(Argentina) Luis Pighetti; Honda	-	-	(Argentina) Jorge Santamarina; Honda
2005	-	-	(Argentina) Sebastian Sanchez; Honda	-	(Argentina) Marcos Patronelli; Yamaha
2006	-	-	(Argentina) Sebastian Sanchez; Honda	-	(Argentina) Marcos Patronelli; Yamaha
2007	-	(France) Arnaud Demeester; Yamaha	-	-	(Argentina) Marcos Patronelli; Honda
2008	-	-	-	(France) Timotei Potisek; Honda	(Argentina) Marcos Patronelli; Honda
2009	-	-	-	(Argentina) Javier Pizzolito; Honda	(Argentina) Jorge Santamarina; Yamaha
2010	-	-	-	(France) Jean-Claude Mousse; Yamaha	(Argentina) Hernán Di Maio; Yamaha
2011	-	-	-	(France) Milko Potisek; Yamaha	(Argentina) Javier Altieri; Yamaha

Winners 2012-2021
Year	PRO Motorcycles	Quads
2012	(Argentina) Luis Correa; Kawasaki	(Argentina) Javier Altieri; Yamaha
2013	(France) Adrien van Beveren; Yamaha	(Argentina) Javier Altieri; Yamaha
2014	(Argentina) Felipe Ellis; Kawasaki	(Argentina) Javier Altieri; Yamaha
2015	(France) Adrien van Beveren; Yamaha	(Argentina) Javier Altieri; Yamaha
2016	(Argentina) Felipe Ellis; Kawasaki	(Argentina) Javier Altieri; Yamaha
2017	(Argentina) Nahuel Kriger; KTM	(Argentina) José Guerra; Yamaha
2018	(Argentina) Darío Arco; Yamaha	(Argentina) José Guerra; Yamaha
2019	(Argentina) Joaquín Poli; Honda	(United States) Chad Wienen; Yamaha
2020	(Argentina) Rodrigo Landa; Yamaha	(Argentina) José Guerra; Yamaha
2021	Not run	

Winners 2022-
Year	PRO Motorcycles	Quads
2022	Not run	
2023	(United Kingdom) Todd Kellett; Yamaha	(Argentina) José Guerra; Yamaha
2024	(United Kingdom) Todd Kellett; Yamaha	(Argentina) José Guerra; Yamaha
2025	(Argentina) Joaquín Poli; Kawasaki	(Argentina) Nahuel Coleur; Yamaha
2026	(Argentina) Cyril Genot; Honda	(Argentina) Santiago Caliendo; Yamaha

== See also ==
- Bibione Sand Storm
- Enduro del Invierno
- Enduropale du Touquet
- Monte Gordo Sand Race
- Weston Beach Race
