= Portuguese Motorcycling Federation =

Federação de Motociclismo de Portugal
- Sport: Motorsport
- Jurisdiction: Portugal
- Abbreviation: FMP
- Headquarters: Lisbon
- President: Armando António Boavista Vieira Marques

Official website
- www.fmp.pt
- (Portugal)

The Portuguese Motorcycling Federation (FMP) (Portuguese: Federação de Motociclismo de Portugal; FMP) is the governing body of Motorcycling in Portugal. It is based in Lisbon.

It organises the Portuguese racing championships, which interests are: Enduro, Cross Country, Quad Cross, Motocross, Supercross, Offroad, SuperMoto, Stunt Riding, Trial and Road racing (CNV - Campeonato Nacional de Velocidade).

Besides racing, it covers several non-competitive activities like managing affiliated Clubs rallies calendar and events such as Portugal de Lés a Lés.
