= Luke Benstead =

Jersey football manager (born 1989)

Personal information
- Date of birth: 19 October 1989
- Place of birth: Jersey

Managerial career
- Years: Team
- 2009–2010: Tranmere Rovers (youth)
- 2010–2012: Everton (youth)
- 2013–2017: Everton (analyst)
- 2017–2018: Manchester United (analyst)
- 2018–2025: Belgium (assistant)
- 2022–2023: Zulte Waregem (youth)
- 2026–: Scotland (assistant)

Luke Benstead (born 19 October 1989) is a Jersey football manager who is an assistant coach for the Scotland national football team.

== Early life ==
Benstead was born on 19 October 1989 in Jersey, the son of Jersey footballer Alan Benstead. As a child, he attended De La Salle College on the island. After graduating from De La Salle College, he left for Liverpool, England to study sports science, pursuing a master's degree.

== Career ==
In 2009, Benstead was appointed as a youth manager for English side Tranmere Rovers. One year later, he was appointed as a youth manager for English Premier League side Everton, and by 2013 was working as an analyst for the club. In 2017, he was appointed as an analyst for English Premier League side Manchester United. During his stay with the club, he worked under Portuguese manager José Mourinho and helped them achieve second place in the league and reach the 2018 FA Cup final.

In 2018, he was appointed as an assistant manager of the Belgium national football team. While working for the team, he was described by Belgian magazine Knack as "the most important man in Belgian football you've never heard of" and a "key figure in the 'technical team' of Belgian football". In 2022, he was appointed as a youth manager of Belgian side Zulte Waregem.

In September 2026, newly-appointed Scotland head coach Sebastian Pocognoli named him as assistant coach as part of his backroom team in a refreshed set up.
