= 2026–2027 FIM Sand Races World Championship =

World championship of beach racing in 2026

The 2026–2027 FIM Sand Races World Championship is the 2nd FIM Sand Races World Championship season. The number of rounds was reduced to five to reduce logistical costs and encourage participation. A new race, the Morocco Sand Race to be held at Mazagan beach, El Jadida, opens the season.

British rider Todd Kellett is the reigning champion, after winning five out of six events contested in the inaugural World Championship season.

== Race calendar and results ==
Location of races.

A provisional calendar was released on 5 March 2026. The championship is to be contested over five rounds in Western Europe and Morocco.

| Round | Date | Location | Motorcycle Winner | Quad Winner | Report |
|---|---|---|---|---|---|
| 1 | 26–27 September | Morocco Sand Race | (Norway) Håkon Fredriksen | (Belgium) Randy Naveaux | |
| 2 | 23–25 October | (Italy) Bibione Sand Storm | (Belgium) Cyril Genot | (Belgium) Randy Naveaux | |
| 3 | 7–8 November | (France) Ronde des Sables de Loon Plage | (Belgium) Cyril Genot | (United Kingdom) Harry Walker | |
| 4 | 27–29 November | (Portugal) Monte Gordo Sand Race | | | |
| 5 | 30–31 January 2027 | (France) Enduropale du Touquet | | | |

Names in Italics were the highest placed FIM-eligible rider in the event when the event was won by a non-eligible rider.

A test was held in Morocco on 13-14 June.

== Regulation changes ==
All events are now of an endurance format with either 1 or 2 races per event. The previous sand cross format of 2 or 3 races being dropped.

A new Sand Races Team Trophy was introduced.

== Moto ==
=== Entry list ===
Sand Races World Championship
| Constructor | Team | Rider | Rounds |
|---|---|---|---|
| Ducati | | (Italy) Matteo Pavoni | 2 |
| Fantic | Joyride MX | (Belgium) Hugo Buchelot | 1–3 |
| Honda | Team Honda Motoblouz SR Motul | (United Kingdom) Todd Kellett | 1–3 |
| Honda | Team Honda Motoblouz SR Motul | (Belgium) Cyril Genot | 1–3 |
| Honda | Team Honda Motoblouz SR Motul | (France) Adrien Petit | 1–3 |
| Honda | Team Dafy Wonderbike | (France) Joey Nuques | 1–3 |
| Honda | Team Dafy Wonderbike | (France) Evan Demeester | 1–3 |
| Honda | | (France) Paul Brunet | 1–3 |
| Honda | | (France) Maximilien Poul | 1–3 |
| Honda | | (France) Corentin Koehl | 1–3 |
| Husqvarna | Osellini Moto | (Italy) Lorenzo Macoritto | 2 |
| Kawasaki | Best Matic | (Italy) Tommaso Lodi | 2 |
| Kawasaki | EDC | (Germany) Paul Haberland | 3 |
| KTM | Darjen Contractors | (United Kingdom) Sion Talbot | 1–3 |
| KTM | | (United Kingdom) Alfie Calvert | 1–2 |
| KTM | | (France) Paul Lescaillet | 1–2 |
| KTM | | (France) Ernest Lescaillet | 1–3 |
| Suzuki | Suzuki France Sand Racing Team | (France) Camille Chapelière | 1–2 |
| Suzuki | Suzuki France Sand Racing Team | (France) Antoine Alix | 1–3 |
| Triumph | Team MS Motorsport | (France) Maxime Sot | 2–3 |
| Yamaha | Yamaha Monster Drag'On Tek | (Norway) Håkon Fredriksen | 1–3 |
| Yamaha | Yamaha Monster Drag'On Tek | (France) Jeremy Hauquier | 1–3 |
| Yamaha | Yamaha Monster Drag'On Tek | (France) Milko Potisek | 3 |
| Yamaha | Yam Sand Racing | (Netherlands) Damien Knuiman | 1–3 |
| Yamaha | Yam Sand Racing | (Belgium) Tias Callens | 3 |
| Yamaha | Buitenhuis Racing | (Netherlands) Roy Leenheer | 1–3 |
| Yamaha | DV Racing Services | (Netherlands) Davey Nieuwenhuizen | 1, 3 |
| Yamaha | | (France) Fabien Maucourt | 1–3 |
| Yamaha | Sand Racing Project | (France) Yann Fakin | 1–3 |
| Yamaha | | (France) Wesley Tanfin | 1–3 |
| Yamaha | Podium Motos | (France) Luca Quenot | 1–3 |
| Yamaha | | (France) Jean Loridan | 1–3 |
| Yamaha | Kaeser Racing | (Germany) Daniel Wagenpfeil | 1–3 |
| Yamaha | | (France) Marshall Meplon | 3 |
| Yamaha | | (Sweden) Dennis Putkuri | 3 |
Women's World Cup
| Constructor | Team | Rider | Rounds |
| Gas Gas | MX Fonta Racing Syneco | (Italy) Kiara Fontanesi | 2 |
| Honda | Team Honda Motoblouz SR Motul | (France) Mathilde Martinez | 1–3 |
| Yamaha | Drag'On Tek/Yamaha France | (France) Mathilde Denis | 1–3 |
Veteran's World Cup
| Constructor | Team | Rider | Rounds |
| Fantic | | (France) Gregory Deleu | 1–3 |
| Fantic | | (France) Bernard Perard | 1–3 |
| Honda | | (France) Christophe Simonnet | 1–2 |
| Honda | | (Belgium) Andre Vossius | 1–3 |
| Honda | | (France) Dominique Mieuzet | 1–3 |
| Husqvarna | | (France) Alexis van de Woestyne | 2 |
| KTM | Sand Racing Project | (France) Jeremy Leulliette | 1 |
| KTM | | (France) Rodrigue Lescaillet | 1–3 |
| KTM | | (Belgium) Geert Goethals | 1–2 |
| KTM | | (Belgium) Daniel Drooghaag | 1–3 |
| KTM | | (France) Ludovic Manier | 2 |
| Yamaha | | (France) Nicolas Lavenant | 1–3 |
| Yamaha | | (France) Raphaël Loridan | 1–3 |
| Yamaha | Yam Sand Racing | (France) Mathieu Reine | 1–3 |
| Yamaha | | (France) Maxime Jeanne | 1–3 |
| Yamaha | | (France) Jeremy Poncet | 2 |
Junior's World Cup
| Constructor | Team | Rider | Rounds |
| Gas Gas | | (France) Arthur Michalak | 1–3 |
| Honda | | (France) Enzo Lefebvre | 1, 3 |
| Husqvarna | Team33 Accessoires/Biket Racing | (France) Matheo Gerat | 1–3 |
| Husqvarna | | (Germany) Nonni Per Lange | 1–3 |
| Husqvarna | | (France) Lorenzo Batista | 1–3 |
| Husqvarna | | (France) Romane Tessier | 1–3 |
| Kawasaki | | (France) Maxime Miet | 1–3 |
| KTM | D.L.B. Motosport | (Israel) Ben Almagor | 1–3 |
| KTM | CC Motorsports | (Portugal) Gonçalo Cardoso | 1–2 |
| Triumph | | (France) Felix Cardineau | 1–3 |
| Yamaha | | (France) Noah Bernard | 1–3 |
| Yamaha | | (Australia) Jasper Bergmuller | 2–3 |
Vintage World Cup
| Constructor | Team | Rider | Rounds |
| Honda | | (France) David Fedele | 1–3 |
| Honda | | (France) Anthony Golleau | 1–3 |
| Honda | | (France) Pablo Henouillle | 1–3 |
| Honda | | (France) Pascal Lallot | 1 |
| Honda | | (France) Freddy Seguin | 1–3 |
| Honda | | (France) Josselin Mioque | 2–3 |
| Kawasaki | | (France) Damien Leblanc | 1–3 |
| Kawasaki | | (France) Tom Paringaux | 1–3 |
| KTM | | (France) Sébastien Antony | 1–3 |
| Yamaha | | (France) Olivier Collet | 1–3 |

=== Sand Races World Championship ===
Only riders who are registered for the FIM Sand Races World Championship were eligible to score championship points.

- Points for final positions are awarded as follows:

| Position | 1st | 2nd | 3rd | 4th | 5th | 6th | 7th | 8th | 9th | 10th | 11th | 12th | 13th | 14th | 15th+ |
| Points | 25 | 20 | 16 | 13 | 11 | 10 | 9 | 8 | 7 | 6 | 5 | 4 | 3 | 2 | 1 |

The FIM World Championship points accrued from the finish are shown next to the position.

| Pos. | Rider | MSR (Morocco) | BSS (Italy) | LOO (France) | MGS (Portugal) | LTO (France) | Points |
|---|---|---|---|---|---|---|---|
| 1 | (Netherlands) Damien Knuiman | 2^{20} | 3^{16} | 3^{16} | | | 52 |
| 2 | (Belgium) Cyril Genot | 21^{1} | 1^{25} | 1^{25} | | | 51 |
| 3 | (Norway) Håkon Fredriksen | 1^{25} | 2^{20} | 10^{6} | | | 51 |
| 4 | (United Kingdom) Todd Kellett | 9^{7} | 4^{13} | 2^{20} | | | 40 |
| 5 | (France) Joey Nuques | 4^{13} | 7^{9} | 6^{10} | | | 32 |
| 6 | (France) Jeremy Hauquier | 3^{16} | 6^{10} | Ret | | | 26 |
| 7 | (France) Adrien Petit | 26^{1} | 5^{11} | 4^{13} | | | 25 |
| 8 | (France) Antoine Alix | 5^{11} | 34^{1} | 8^{8} | | | 20 |
| 9 | (United Kingdom) Sion Talbot | 10^{6} | 9^{7} | 11^{5} | | | 18 |
| 10 | (United Kingdom) Alfie Calvert | 7^{9} | 10^{6} | | | | 15 |
| 11 | (France) Luca Quenot | 6^{10} | 13^{3} | 15^{1} | | | 14 |
| 12 | (France) Maxime Sot | | 12^{4} | 7^{9} | | | 13 |
| 13 | (Belgium) Tias Callens | | | 5^{11} | | | 11 |
| 14 | (France) Evan Demeester | 8^{8} | 35^{1} | 27^{1} | | | 10 |
| 15 | (Belgium) Hugo Buchelot | 11^{5} | 11^{5} | Ret | | | 10 |
| 16 | (Italy) Matteo Pavoni | | 8^{8} | | | | 8 |
| 17 | (Netherlands) Davey Nieuwenhuizen | 39^{1} | | 9^{7} | | | 8 |
| 18 | (Belgium) Daniel Drooghaag | 12^{4} | 15^{1} | 14^{2} | | | 7 |
| 19 | (France) Maxime Jeanne | 15^{1} | 38^{1} | 12^{4} | | | 6 |
| 20 | (Germany) Daniel Wagenpfeil | 13^{3} | 16^{1} | 20^{1} | | | 5 |
| 21 | (France) Mathilde Martinez | 14^{2} | 14^{2} | 16^{1} | | | 5 |
| 22 | (France) Marshall Meplon | | | 13^{3} | | | 3 |
| 23 | (France) Maximilien Poul | 16^{1} | 17^{1} | 22^{1} | | | 3 |
| 24 | (Netherlands) Roy Leenheer | 17^{1} | 39^{1} | 17^{1} | | | 3 |
| 25 | (France) Mathilde Denis | 24^{1} | 18^{1} | 19^{1} | | | 2 |
| 26 | (France) Raphaël Loridan | 18^{1} | 21^{1} | 23^{1} | | | 3 |
| 27 | (France) Fabien Maucourt | 23^{1} | 41^{1} | 18^{1} | | | 3 |
| 28 | (France) Paul Brunet | 22^{1} | 19^{1} | 26^{1} | | | 2 |
| 29 | (France) Mathieu Reine | 20^{1} | 20^{1} | 25^{1} | | | 3 |
| 30 | (France) Jean Loridan | 37^{1} | 42^{1} | 21^{1} | | | 3 |
| 31 | (France) Wesley Tanfin | 27^{1} | 22^{1} | 28^{1} | | | 3 |
| 32 | (France) Gregory Deleu | 30^{1} | 25^{1} | 24^{1} | | | 3 |
| 33 | (France) Nicolas Lavenant | 33^{1} | 28^{1} | 29^{1} | | | 3 |
| 34 | (France) Dominique Mieuzet | 32^{1} | 27^{1} | 30^{1} | | | 3 |
| 35 | (France) Rodrigue Lescaillet | 31^{1} | 29^{1} | 31^{1} | | | 3 |
| 36 | (France) Bernard Perard | 36^{1} | 30^{1} | 32^{1} | | | 3 |
| 37 | (France) Yann Fakin | 34^{1} | 31^{1} | 33^{1} | | | 3 |
| 38 | (Belgium) Andre Vossius | 35^{1} | 32^{1} | 34^{1} | | | 3 |
| 39 | (France) Paul Lescaillet | 19^{1} | 43^{1} | | | | 2 |
| 40 | (France) Corentin Koehl | 28^{1} | 23^{1} | Ret | | | 2 |
| 41 | (France) Camille Chapelière | 25^{1} | 37^{1} | | | | 2 |
| 42 | (France) Ernest Lescaillet | 29^{1} | 26^{1} | Ret | | | 2 |
| 43 | (Italy) Lorenzo Macoritto | | 33^{1} | | | | 1 |
| 44 | (France) Alexis van de Woestyne | | 24^{1} | | | | 1 |
| 45 | (Italy) Kiara Fontanesi | | 36^{1} | | | | 1 |
| 46 | (Sweden) Dennis Putkuri | | | 35^{1} | | | 1 |
| 47 | (Italy) Tommaso Lodi | | 40^{1} | | | | 1 |
| 48 | (France) Jeremy Leulliette | 38^{1} | | | | | 1 |
| 49 | (France) Jeremy Poncet | | 44^{1} | | | | 1 |
| 50 | (France) Ludovic Manier | | 45^{1} | | | | 1 |
| 51 | (Belgium) Geert Goethals | Ret | 46^{1} | | | | 1 |
| 52 | (Germany) Paul Haberland | | | Ret | | | 0 |
| 53 | (France) Milko Potisek | | | Ret | | | 0 |
| Pos. | Rider | MSR (Morocco) | BSS (Italy) | LOO (France) | MGS (Portugal) | LTO (France) | Points |

=== Women's World Cup ===
Rider's finishing positions are shown relative to where they finished amongst FIM-eligible riders.

| Pos. | Rider | MSR (Morocco) | BSS (Italy) | LOO (France) | MGS (Portugal) | LTO (France) | Points |
|---|---|---|---|---|---|---|---|
| 1 | (France) Mathilde Martinez | 1^{25} | 1^{25} | 1^{25} | | | 75 |
| 2 | (France) Mathilde Denis | 2^{20} | 3^{16} | 2^{20} | | | 56 |
| 3 | (Italy) Kiara Fontanesi | | 2^{20} | | | | 20 |
| Pos. | Rider | MSR (Morocco) | BSS (Italy) | LOO (France) | MGS (Portugal) | LTO (France) | Points |

=== Veteran's World Cup ===
Rider's finishing positions are shown relative to where they finished amongst FIM-eligible riders.

| Pos. | Rider | MSR (Morocco) | BSS (Italy) | LOO (France) | MGS (Portugal) | LTO (France) | Points |
|---|---|---|---|---|---|---|---|
| 1 | (Belgium) Daniel Drooghaag | 1^{25} | 1^{25} | 1^{25} | | | 75 |
| 2 | (France) Mathieu Reine | 3^{16} | 2^{20} | 4^{13} | | | 49 |
| 3 | (France) Raphaël Loridan | 5^{11} | 3^{16} | 2^{20} | | | 47 |
| 4 | (France) Gregory Deleu | 4^{13} | 5^{11} | 3^{16} | | | 40 |
| 5 | (France) Nicolas Lavenant | 6^{10} | 7^{9} | 5^{11} | | | 30 |
| 6 | (France) Maxime Jeanne | 2^{20} | 8^{8} | | | | 28 |
| 7 | (France) Dominique Mieuzet | 8^{8} | 6^{10} | 6^{10} | | | 28 |
| 8 | (France) Rodrigue Lescaillet | 9^{7} | 9^{7} | 7^{9} | | | 23 |
| 9 | (Belgium) Andre Vossius | 7^{9} | 13^{3} | 9^{7} | | | 19 |
| 10 | (France) Bernard Perard | 11^{5} | 10^{6} | 8^{8} | | | 19 |
| 11 | (France) Alexis van de Woestyne | | 4^{13} | | | | 13 |
| 12 | (France) Christophe Simonnet | 10^{6} | 12^{4} | | | | 10 |
| 13 | (France) Jeremy Poncet | | 11^{5} | | | | 5 |
| 14 | (France) Jeremy Leulliette | 12^{4} | | | | | 4 |
| 15 | (France) Ludovic Manier | | 14^{2} | | | | 2 |
| 16 | (Belgium) Geert Goethals | Ret | 15^{1} | | | | 1 |
| Pos. | Rider | MSR (Morocco) | BSS (Italy) | LOO (France) | MGS (Portugal) | LTO (France) | Points |

=== Junior's World Cup ===
The FIM World Championship points accrued from the finish are shown next to the position.

| Pos. | Rider | MSR (Morocco) | BSS (Italy) | LOO (France) | MGS (Portugal) | LTO (France) | Points |
|---|---|---|---|---|---|---|---|
| 1 | (Israel) Ben Almagor | 2^{20} | 1^{25} | 1^{25} | | | 70 |
| 2 | (France) Matheo Gerat | 4^{13} | 3^{16} | 2^{20} | | | 49 |
| 3 | (France) Felix Cardineau | 1^{25} | Ret | 3^{16} | | | 41 |
| 4 | (Portugal) Gonçalo Cardoso | 3^{16} | 2^{20} | | | | 36 |
| 5 | (France) Maxime Miet | 6^{10} | 5^{11} | 5^{11} | | | 32 |
| 6 | (Germany) Nonni Per Lange | 8^{8} | 4^{13} | 6^{10} | | | 31 |
| 7 | (France) Arthur Michalak | 9^{7} | 7^{9} | 7^{9} | | | 25 |
| 8 | (France) Enzo Lefebvre | 5^{11} | | 4^{13} | | | 24 |
| 9 | (France) Noah Bernard | 10^{6} | 8^{8} | 9^{7} | | | 21 |
| 10 | (France) Romane Tessier | 7^{9} | 6^{10} | Ret | | | 19 |
| 11 | (Australia) Jasper Bergmuller | | Ret | 8^{8} | | | 8 |
| 12 | (France) Lorenzo Batista | Ret | 9^{7} | Ret | | | 7 |
| Pos. | Rider | MSR (Morocco) | BSS (Italy) | LOO (France) | MGS (Portugal) | LTO (France) | Points |

=== Vintage World Cup ===
Rider's finishing positions are shown relative to where they finished amongst FIM-eligible riders.

| Pos. | Rider | MSR (Morocco) | BSS (Italy) | LOO (France) | MGS (Portugal) | LTO (France) | Points |
|---|---|---|---|---|---|---|---|
| 1 | (France) Pablo Henouillle | 1^{25} | 1^{25} | 1^{25} | | | 75 |
| 2 | (France) Anthony Golleau | 3^{16} | 3^{16} | 2^{20} | | | 52 |
| 3 | (France) Sébastien Antony | 2^{20} | 2^{20} | 7^{9} | | | 49 |
| 4 | (France) Freddy Seguin | 4^{13} | 4^{13} | 3^{16} | | | 42 |
| 5 | (France) David Fedele | 5^{11} | 5^{11} | 4^{13} | | | 35 |
| 6 | (France) Olivier Collet | 6^{10} | 7^{9} | 8^{8} | | | 27 |
| 7 | (France) Damien Leblanc | 7^{9} | 8^{8} | 9^{7} | | | 24 |
| 8 | (France) Tom Paringaux | Ret | 6^{10} | 5^{11} | | | 21 |
| 9 | (France) Josselin Mioque | | Ret | 6^{10} | | | 10 |
| 10 | (France) Pascal Lallot | 8^{8} | | | | | 8 |
| Pos. | Rider | MSR (Morocco) | BSS (Italy) | LOO (France) | MGS (Portugal) | LTO (France) | Points |

== Quad ==
=== Entry list ===
Quad World Cup
| Constructor | Team | Rider | Rounds |
|---|---|---|---|
| Honda | | (Belgium) Glenn De Swarte | 1–3 |
| Honda | | (Belgium) Oliver Vandendijck | 1–3 |
| TRX | | (Italy) Rodolfo Codazzi | 2 |
| Laegers | | (United Kingdom) Mark McLernon | 3 |
| Yamaha | NX Concept/Handy Racing | (Belgium) Randy Naveaux | 1–3 |
| Yamaha | | (France) Aloïs Waloszek | 1–3 |
| Yamaha | | (France) Fabien Michel | 1–3 |
| Yamaha | | (France) William Jouy | 1–3 |
| Yamaha | | (France) Kevin Emerit | 1–3 |
| Yamaha | Drag'On | (France) Maxime Lopes da Fonseca | 1–3 |
| Yamaha | PAR Homes/Drag'On ATV/Laeger's | (United Kingdom) Harry Walker | 1–3 |
| Yamaha | | (Netherlands) Mick Gieling | 1 |
| Yamaha | | (Hungary) Zsófia Mohácsi | 1 |
| Yamaha | | (France) Pablo Violet | 1, 3 |
| Yamaha | MB Vehicle Solutions | (United Kingdom) Oliver Sansom | 3 |
Quad Veteran's World Cup
| Constructor | Team | Rider | Rounds |
| Can-Am | | (United Kingdom) Graham Guy | 1, 3 |
| Honda | | (Belgium) Dirk Schelfhout | 1–3 |
| Yamaha | Drag'On | (France) Benoît Sebert | 1–3 |
| Yamaha | Drag'On | (France) Axel Dutrie | 1–3 |
| Yamaha | | (Portugal) Nuno Gonçalves | 1–3 |
| Yamaha | | (France) Nathanaelle Abgrall | 1–3 |
| Yamaha | | (France) Cedric Girard | 1–3 |
| Yamaha | | (Portugal) Paulo Fernandes | 1–3 |
| Yamaha | | (France) Laurent Delcourt | 1–3 |
| Yamaha | | (France) Martin Lener | 1–3 |
| Yamaha | | (France) Yvan Lener | 1–3 |
| Yamaha | | (Hungary) Krisztian Bundics | 2 |

=== Quad Standings ===
Only riders who are registered for the FIM Sand Races World Championship are eligible to score championship points.

- Points for final positions are awarded as follows:

| Position | 1st | 2nd | 3rd | 4th | 5th | 6th | 7th | 8th | 9th | 10th | 11th | 12th | 13th | 14th | 15th+ |
| Points | 25 | 20 | 16 | 13 | 11 | 10 | 9 | 8 | 7 | 6 | 5 | 4 | 3 | 2 | 1 |

The FIM World Championship points accrued from the finish are shown next to the position.

| Pos. | Rider | MSR (Morocco) | BSS (Italy) | LOO (France) | MGS (Portugal) | LTO (France) | Points |
|---|---|---|---|---|---|---|---|
| 1 | (Belgium) Oliver Vandendijck | 2^{20} | 2^{20} | 5^{11} | | | 51 |
| 2 | (Belgium) Randy Naveaux | 1^{25} | 1^{25} | Ret | | | 50 |
| 3 | (Belgium) Glenn De Swarte | 5^{11} | 3^{16} | 4^{13} | | | 40 |
| 4 | (United Kingdom) Harry Walker | 13^{3} | 10^{6} | 1^{25} | | | 34 |
| 5 | (Belgium) Dirk Schelfhout | 3^{16} | 4^{13} | Ret | | | 29 |
| 6 | (France) Axel Dutrie | 6^{10} | 8^{8} | 8^{8} | | | 26 |
| 7 | (France) Aloïs Waloszek | 4^{13} | 5^{11} | 15^{1} | | | 25 |
| 8 | (Portugal) Nuno Gonçalves | 11^{5} | 7^{9} | 6^{10} | | | 24 |
| 9 | (France) Pablo Violet | 23^{1} | | 2^{20} | | | 21 |
| 10 | (France) William Jouy | 9^{7} | 12^{4} | 7^{9} | | | 20 |
| 11 | (France) Kevin Emerit | 10^{6} | 9^{7} | 9^{7} | | | 20 |
| 12 | (France) Fabien Michel | 8^{8} | 6^{10} | Ret | | | 18 |
| 13 | (United Kingdom) Mark McLernon | | | 3^{16} | | | 16 |
| 14 | (France) Benoît Sebert | 7^{9} | 13^{3} | 17^{1} | | | 13 |
| 15 | (France) Nathanaelle Abgrall | 16^{1} | 11^{5} | 10^{6} | | | 12 |
| 16 | (France) Maxime Lopes da Fonseca | 12^{4} | 17^{1} | 11^{5} | | | 10 |
| 17 | (Portugal) Paulo Fernandes | 18^{1} | Ret | 12^{4} | | | 5 |
| 18 | (France) Yvan Lener | 15^{1} | 16^{1} | 13^{3} | | | 5 |
| 19 | (France) Cedric Girard | 17^{1} | 14^{2} | 14^{2} | | | 5 |
| 20 | (France) Martin Lener | 14^{2} | 15^{1} | Ret | | | 3 |
| 21 | (France) Laurent Delcourt | 21^{1} | 18^{1} | 16^{1} | | | 3 |
| 22 | (United Kingdom) Graham Guy | 20^{1} | | 18^{1} | | | 2 |
| 23 | (Hungary) Krisztian Bundics | | 19^{1} | | | | 1 |
| 24 | (Netherlands) Mick Gieling | 19^{1} | | | | | 1 |
| 25 | (Hungary) Zsófia Mohácsi | 22^{1} | | | | | 1 |
| | (United Kingdom) Oliver Sansom | | | Ret | | | 0 |
| | (Italy) Rodolfo Codazzi | | Ret | | | | 0 |
| Pos. | Rider | MSR (Morocco) | BSS (Italy) | LOO (France) | MGS (Portugal) | LTO (France) | Points |

=== Quad Veteran's World Cup ===
Rider's finishing positions are shown relative to where they finished amongst FIM-eligible riders.

| Pos. | Rider | MSR (Morocco) | BSS (Italy) | LOO (France) | MGS (Portugal) | LTO (France) | Points |
|---|---|---|---|---|---|---|---|
| 1 | (Portugal) Nuno Gonçalves | 3^{16} | 2^{20} | 1^{25} | | | 61 |
| 2 | (Belgium) Dirk Schelfhout | 1^{25} | 1^{25} | Ret | | | 50 |
| 3 | (France) Nathanaelle Abgrall | 6^{10} | 4^{13} | 3^{16} | | | 39 |
| 4 | (France) Benoît Sebert | 2^{20} | 7^{9} | 8^{8} | | | 37 |
| 5 | (France) Axel Dutrie | | 3^{16} | 2^{20} | | | 36 |
| 6 | (France) Cedric Girard | 7^{9} | 5^{11} | 6^{10} | | | 30 |
| 7 | (France) Laurent Delcourt | 10^{6} | 9^{7} | 7^{9} | | | 22 |
| 8 | (Portugal) Paulo Fernandes | 8^{8} | Ret | 4^{13} | | | 21 |
| 9 | (France) Yvan Lener | | 8^{8} | 5^{11} | | | 19 |
| 10 | (United Kingdom) Graham Guy | 9^{7} | | 9^{7} | | | 14 |
| 11 | (France) Raphael Loridan | 4^{13} | | | | | 13 |
| 12 | (France) Jean Loridan | 5^{11} | | | | | 11 |
| 13 | (France) Martin Lener | | 6^{10} | Ret | | | 10 |
| 14 | (Hungary) Krisztian Bundics | | 10^{6} | | | | 6 |
| Pos. | Rider | MSR (Morocco) | BSS (Italy) | LOO (France) | MGS (Portugal) | LTO (France) | Points |
