= Daymond Martens =

Belgian motocross and sand racer

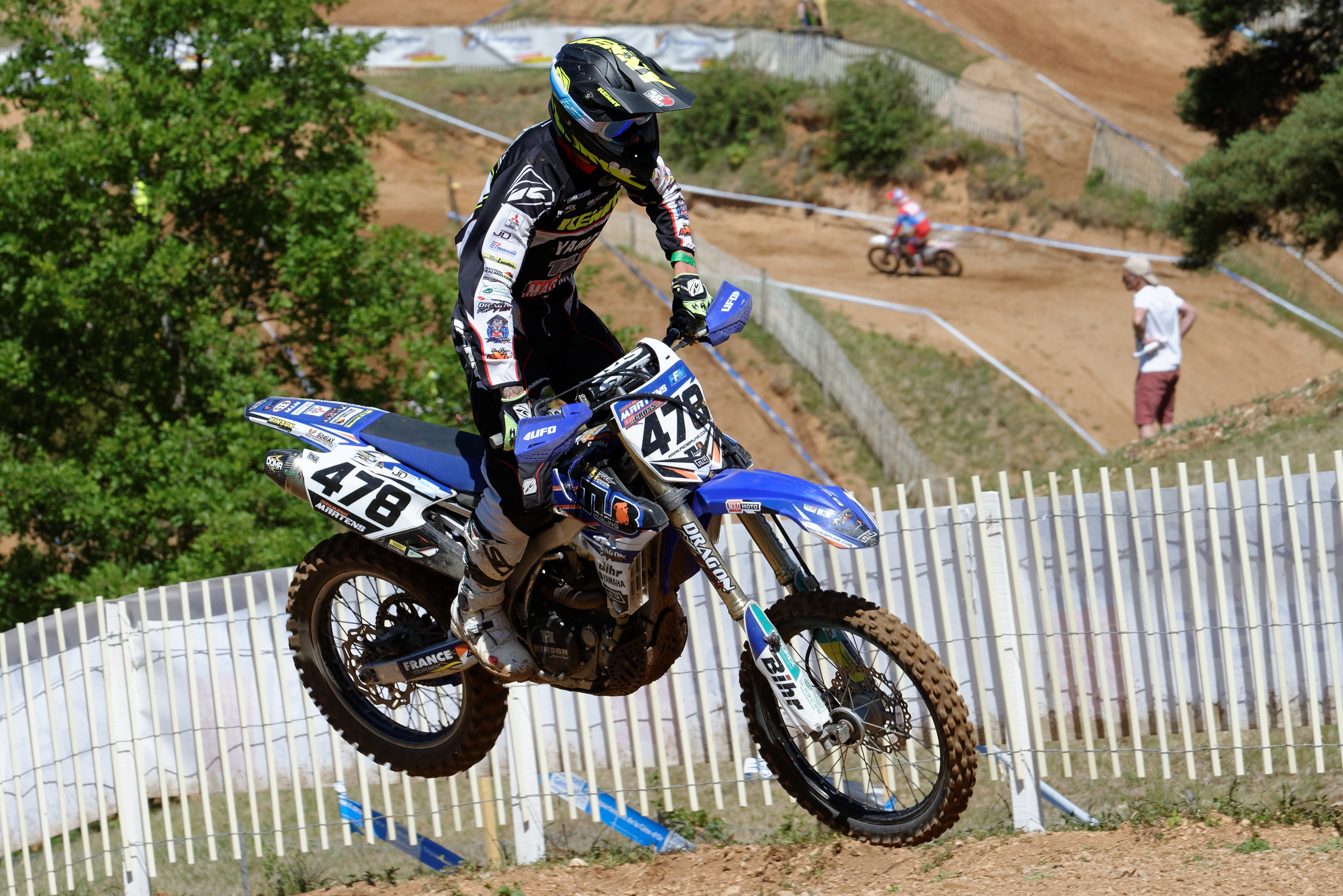
- Daymond Martens at the MX international Côte d'Or 2015
- Born: September 11, 1995 (age 31); Chimay, Hainaut, Belgium
- Occupation: Motocross and sand racer
- Teams: Yamaha, KTM, Kawasaki, Honda

Championship titles
- French Sand Racing Championship (2017); Enduropale du Touquet (2017)
Statistics
FIM Sand Races World Cup
Active years	2023
Championships	0
Manufacturer	Honda
Best season (2023)	3rd (38 pts)
Starts / Wins / Podiums / Points; 3 / 0 / 1 / 38
French Sand Racing Championship (CFS)
Active years	2016-
Championships	1 (2017)
Team(s)	Yamaha, KTM, Kawasaki, Honda
Starts / Wins / Podiums; 48 / 4 / 7

Daymond Martens (born 11 September 1995) is a Belgian motorcycle racer who specialises in motocross and sand racing. In 2017 he won the Enduropale du Touquet and the French Sand Racing Championship.

== Biography ==
Martens was born on 11 September 1995 in Chimay, Hainaut, Belgium. The son of a motocross rider, he began riding bikes at the age of four.

=== Racing career ===
Martens began competing in the 85cc class of the Belgium Junior Championship and in 2009 became champion. Two years later, in 2011, he was the runner-up in the SX250 Belgium Junior Championship and won the title in 2012. In 2013, he competed in the junior category of the French Sand Racing Championship, where he archived five podium finishes and victory in the junior category at the Enduropale du Touquet.

In 2014, Martens moved up to the MX1 category and the following year a rear brake failure prevented him taking the victory at the Enduropale. In 2016, he was part of the Belgian team that won the Copa de l'Avenir. In the sand racing championship, he won at Beach-Cross de Berck and Ronde des Sables de Loon Plage. Heading to Le Touquet, Martens was fifth in the championship standings but a punctured fuel tank put him out of the race.

Martens won the GURP TT de Grayan-et-l'Hôpital and after a close battle with Yamaha teammate Adrien Van Beveren Martens won the 2017 Enduropale. This secured winning the French Sand Racing Championship.

In 2018, Martens announced that he was 'returning to his roots' and was going to concentrate on motocross, in particular the EMX300 and Belgian Inters 250cc championships. Along with co-riders Jérémy Carpentier and Cédric Cremer, Martens won the 12 heures de la Chinelle in 2018.

In 2019, Martens finished second in the Enduropale.

Switching to KTM for 2020, Martens crashed heavily at Grayan-et-l'Hôpital and fractured his L1 vertebra. The injury prevented him competing in the Enduropale. Martens switched from Kawasaki to Honda for the 2021/2022 sand racing season.

In 2023, Martens competed in the inaugural FIM Sand Races World Cup where he finished third.

At the 2024 Enduropale, Martens crashed out on the first lap.

== Results ==
=== FIM Sand Races World Cup results ===
Year	Pos.	LTO (France)	EDV (Argentina)	MGS (Portugal)	Points
2023	3rd	5	5	3	38

=== French Sand Racing Championship results ===
Year	Starts	Wins	Podiums	Position	Points
2017	6	2	4	1st	?
2018	6	0	1	6th	547
2019	3	0	0	23rd	1210
2021	6	0	0	6th	2360
2022	5	0	0	6th	2070
2023	6	0	0	6th	2440
2024	5	0	0	7th	2,110
2025	3	0	0	38th	1,030

=== Enduropale du Touquet results ===
Year	2013	2014	2015	2016	2017	2018	2019	2020	2021	2022	2023	2024	2025	2017
Results	1st Junior class	21st	2nd	DNF	1st	4th	2nd	-	Cancelled	11th	6th	DNF	4th	12th
