= Timoteï Potisek =

French motorcycle racer (1983–2009)

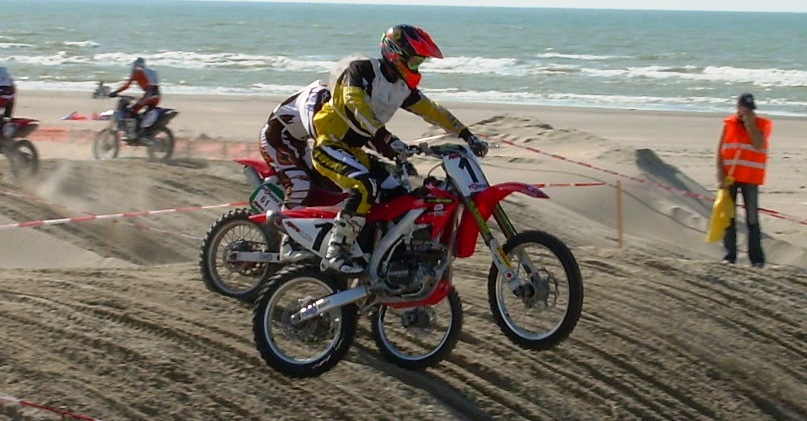
- Timoteï Potisek at Beach-Cross de Berck in 2006
- Born: December 26, 1983; Saint-Pol-sur-Mer, Nord Department, France
- Died: December 10, 2009 (aged 25); Lille, French Flanders; Died from injuries sustained during a fall in training
- Occupation: Motorcycle sand racer
- Relatives: Milko Potisek (cousin)
- Teams: Honda, Yamaha

Championship titles
- French Sand Racing Champion 2008; Winner Enduropale du Touquet 2006 & 2009

Timoteï Potisek (26 December 1983 – 10 December 2009) was a French motorcycle racer who specialised in sand racing. He was the French Sand Racing Champion in 2008 and winner of the Enduropale du Touquet in 2006 and 2009. Potisek died from injuries sustained from a fall whilst training for the 2009 Ronde des Sables de Loon Plage.

== Biography ==
Potisek was born on 26 December 1983, in Saint-Pol-sur-Mer, Nord Department to motorcycling family. His father Rudy was a motocross champion and had finished second in the Enduropale in 1977 and 1980. Potisek, along with his twin brother Mateï and older brother Sergeï, grew up riding motorcycles.

=== Racing career ===
At the age of 14, Potisek competed in the 1998 Enduropale. He finish 42nd out of nearly 1,000 riders, and First in the 125 cc class. In 2002, he obtained his scientific baccalaureate but decided not to pursue further education and joined the family Honda dealership.

In 2004 and 2005, Potisek finished second in the Enduropale, finally winning in 2006. In 2007 he collided with a backmarker whilst in the lead. Potisek's radiator was punctured in the collision forcing him to retire.

Fortunes changed in 2008 with Potisek winning numerous French and international races and became the French Sand Racing Champion. At the Enduropale, whilst in the lead, he was brought down when Arnaud Demeester tried to overtake him. Demeester won with Potisek second.

Potisek also raced in the MX1 class in the Motocross World Championship.

Having always raced a Honda, Potisek changed to Yamaha in late 2009. His First race for the marque was to be the Ronde des Sables de Loon Plage on 22 November.

=== Death ===
On 6 December 2009 whilst training at the Loon-Plage course, Potisek suffered a fall and landed on his head. He suffered fractures of the cervical vertebrae and spinal cord damage. Initially taken to Dunkirk hospital unconscious and in cardiac arrest, he was then airlifted to the University Hospital of Lille where he died on 10 December.

At the 2010 Enduropale, the number 1 bib was not used in memory of the former winner and his father Rudy and twin brother Mateï rode a lap of the circuit in his honour.

== Trophée Timoteï Potisek ==
In memory of Potisek, the Potisek family organised a race with the winner being awarded the Trophée Timoteï Potisek. The race was held at the Cassel circuit, a few hundred metres from where Potisek was buried on Whit Monday 2010. Although a round of the Flanders league many international riders participated. The event was repeated annually. In 2016, now sponsored by Red Bull, the event was streamed live using five cameras and a drone. 10,000 people watched the race live online.

Trophée Timoteï Potisek Winners
Year	Winner	Bike
2010	Mickaël Pichon	Honda 450cc
2011	Mickaël Pichon	Honda 450cc
2012	Milko Potisek	Yamaha 450cc
2013	Nicolas Aubin	Honda 450cc
2014	Steve Ramon	Suzuki 450cc
2015	Steven Lenoir	KTM 350cc
2016	Milko Potisek	Yamaha 450cc
2019	Nathan Watson	KTM 450cc
2022	Milko Potisek	Yamaha 450cc
2023	Cédric Soubeyras	Honda 450cc
2024	Cédric Soubeyras	Kawasaki 450cc
2025	Maxime Desprey	Yamaha 450cc

== Racing record ==
Year	Results
1998	42nd Enduro du Touquet (winner 125 cc class); 2nd Rond'Europe à Fort-Mahon
2002	6th Enduro du Touquet
2004	2nd Enduro du Touquet
2005	2nd Enduro du Touquet; 2nd Beach-Cross de Berck
2006	Winner Enduropale du Touquet; 2nd Rond'Europe à Fort-Mahon; Winner Ronde des Sables de Loon Plage
2007	Winner GURP TT de Grayan-et-l'Hôpital; Winner Ronde des Sables Hossegor-Capbreton; Winner of the Ronde des Sables de Loon Plage; Winner Red Bull Knock Out
2008	Winner French Sand Racing Championship (CFS); Winner GURP TT de Grayan-et-l'Hôpital; Winner Ronde des Sables Hossegor-Capbreton; 2nd Enduropale du Touquet; Winner Supercross del Verano; Winner Enduro del Verano; Winner Enduro d'Ailly-sur-Noye; Winner Ronde des Sables de Loon-Plage; Winner Rond'Europe à Fort-Mahon
2009	Winner Enduropale du Touquet
