= Red Bull Knock Out =

- Location: Scheveningen, Netherlands; 52.1157300°N 4.2801600°E
- Corporate sponsor: Red Bull
- First race: 2006

Circuit information
- Surface: Sand
- Length: 4.5 km (2.8 mi)

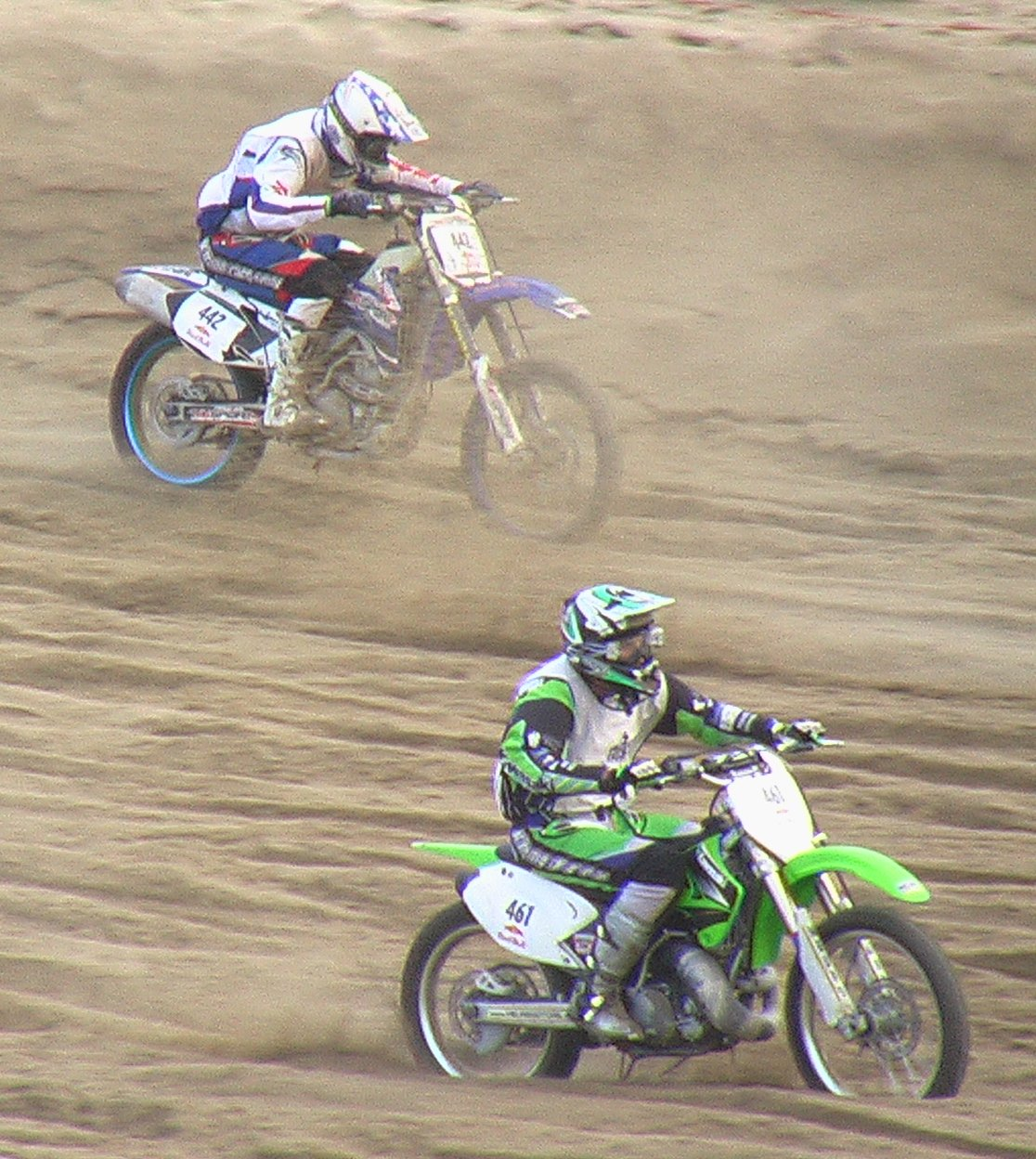
Red Bull Knock Out 2006

The Red Bull Knock Out was a motorcycle beach race held at Scheveningen, The Hague, Netherlands that has been run six times. It was organised by Red Bull, the Royal Dutch Motorcyclists Association (KNMV), KTM and the Municipality of The Hague. Known as the "toughest beach race in the world" it regularly attracted over 150,000 spectators.

== History ==
The inaugural event took place in 2006 and consisted of a heat and a final. Timotei Potisek won the heat and led the final until the last lap when he crashed and handed the win to Marc de Reuver. 150,000 spectators attended.

In 2007, 500 riders entered. All competitors raced in the first heat that lasted an hour. The top 200 went on to the 'Knock Out Elimination' witch lasted 45 minutes and the top 50 went on to the 30 minute final which was won by Timotei Potisek.

650 riders took part in 2008. A heat was run with the top 325 finishers progressing to the main race. Top riders David Knight, Marc de Reuver and Timotei Potisek all suffered breakdowns whilst in the lead. The race was won by Belgium Steve Ramon.

After a break of seven years, the race was revived in 2015. With an entry list expanded to 1,500, a knockout system of qualifying took place on Saturday 28 November with a semi-final and the final on Sunday.

The event took place over a single day in 2016, 19 November. Two heats took place in the morning to reduce the 1000 entrants to 750 for the final which took place in the afternoon. For the last 45 minutes of the final the 'x-loop' is added to the course. This 200 m (660 ft) 'minefield' section has holes, craters, logs and massive dunes to cross. Reigning MX2 champion Jeffrey Herlings won the 20 lap final.

In 2017 the municipality and Red Bull signed a cooperation agreement to run the race biennially in 2018, 2020 and 2022.

The 2018 event was the finale of the World Enduro Super Series (WESS) took place on a 4.5 km (2.8 mi) track with 57 jumps per lap. 80,000 cubic meters of sand were moved to build the course. Run on 10 November it had heats in the morning to reduce the 1,000 riders to 750 to contest the main race in the afternoon. Nathan Watson won the race and Billy Bolt was crowned WESS champion.

== Results ==
Results
| Year | Winner | 2nd | 3rd | Source |
|---|---|---|---|---|
| 2006 | (Netherlands) Marc de Reuver - Yamaha | (Belgium) Steve Ramon - Suzuki | (France) Timotei Potisek - Honda | |
| 2007 | (France) Timoteï Potisek | (France) Jean-Claude Moussé | (Netherlands) William Saris | |
| 2008 | (Belgium) Steve Ramon - Suzuki | (France) Arnaud Demeester - Yamaha | (Belgium) Johan Boonen - KTM | |
| 2015 | (Belgium) Axel van de Sande | (United Kingdom) Nathan Watson | (France) Camille Chapeliere | |
| 2016 | (Netherlands) Jeffrey Herlings - KTM | (United Kingdom) Nathan Watson - KTM | (Netherlands) Glenn Coldenhoff - KTM | |
| 2018 | (United Kingdom) Nathan Watson - KTM | (Netherlands) Glenn Coldenhoff - KTM | (Belgium) Yentel Martens : Husqvarna | |
