= Milko Potisek =

French motocross and sand racer

- Born: December 27, 1989 (age 36); Dunkirk, Nord Department, France
- Nickname: The Lion of Flanders
- Occupation: Motocross and sand racer
- Relatives: Timoteï Potisek (cousin)
- Current team: Monster Energy Drag'on Tek Yamaha

Championship titles
- French Elite Motocross Championship (2022); French Sand Racing Championship (2022); Winner Enduropale du Touquet (2018, 2020, 2022)
Statistics
Sand Races World Championship
Active years	2025-
Last season (2025)	2nd (107 pts)
Starts / Wins / Podiums / Points; 6 / 0 / 5 / 127
French Sand Racing Championship
Active years	2016-
Championships	1 (2022)
Best season (2022)	1st (4 wins/3,500 points)
MXGP Motocross World Championship
Active years	2014-2018, 2020
Best season (2014)	19th (145 pts)
Starts / Wins / Podiums / Points; 60 / 0 / 0 / 287
MX3 Motocross World Championship
Active years	2010-2012
Best season (2011)	2nd (4 wins/297 pts)
Starts / Wins / Podiums / Points; 35 / 5 / 18 / 621
MX1 Motocross World Championship
Active years	2010-2013
Best season (2012)	19th (72 pts)
Starts / Wins / Podiums / Points; 40 / 0 / 0 / 165

Milko Potisek (born 27 December 1989), known as the Lion of Flanders, is a French motorcycle racer who specialises in motocross and sand racing. He was the French Elite Motocross Champion and French Sand Racing Champion in 2022. He has also won the Enduropale du Touquet three times.

== Biography ==
Potisek was born in Dunkirk on 27 December 1989, the son of a motorcycle dealer. He grew up around motorcycles, and at the age of three, he started riding a Yamaha PW50 in the fields.

=== Career ===
With a lower age limit in Belgium than France, Potisek competed in the 65cc category of the Belgian Motocross Championship at age 8. He started competing in France age 12 on a Kawasaki KX80 before switching to a Yamaha YZ80. He finished 5th in the French Minivert Championship.

In 200, Potisek had his first wins in top-level events at Berck and Loon Plage. The following year, he started competing on a 450 machine and won the Skegness Beach Race and finished fifth in the MX3 World Championship.

Potisek won the Enduro del Verano, finished 3rd in the Enduropale du Touquet and was runner-up in the MX3 World Championship on a Honda in 2011. Joining the HDI team for 2012, Potisek entered the MX1 World Championship finishing 19th. The 2013 Enduropale was held in cold and snowy conditions. After an hour, the race was stopped due to the incoming tide. Although Potisek was in the lead when the race was stopped the stewards, after an hours deliberation, decided the results should be the position at the end of the previous lap and awarded the win to Jean-Claude Moussé. In 2013 he joined Team 2B and raced for them in the 2014 MXGP, finishing 19th.

Racing for the Tip Top team, Potisek had bad accident at the Lille Supercross in November 2014, breaking his tibia and fibula. His injuries prevented him completing in the 2015 Enduropale and in March of that year he had another accident. He returned to competitions in October 2015 finishing 2nd at the Beach-Cross de Berck.

Potisek had his maiden win in the Enduropale in 2018 and won again in 2020.

After disruptions to racing due to COVID-19, Potisek was runner up in the 2021 French Elite Motocross Championship. He won the championship in 2022.

Winning the Enduropale for the third time in 2022 sealed Potisek's winning of the French Sand Racing Championship.

A few days before the 2024 Enduropale, Potisek suffered a huge crash while practicing. He sustained a collapsed lung and liver and pelvis injuries. Once recovered, he then broke his arm side-lining him again. Fully fit, he finished second in the 2025 Enduropale. He also competed in the ADAC MX Masters in 2025 and the Sand Races World Championship where he finished second overall.
