= Weston Beach Race =

- Location: Weston-super-Mare, Somerset, England
- Corporate sponsor: ROKiT Tyres
- First race: 1983
- Duration: 3 hours
- Most wins (rider): Todd Kellett (7)

Circuit information
- Surface: Sand
- Length: 7 km (4.3 mi)

The Weston Beach Race (originally called Enduro du Super Mare) is an annual sand race held on the beach at Weston-super-Mare, Somerset over a weekend, usually in October. It is one of the largest off-road motorcycle events in Britain. Open to both amateur and professional riders on motorcycles, quads and sidecars, it regularly attracts over 1,000 participants and attracts crowds of 100,000.

== History ==
The event was the brainchild of George Greenland, Jack Matthews, and Eddie Chandler and was first run in 1983, Originally named Enduro du Super Mare to fall in with the continental races such as the Enduro du Touquet, it was organised by Enduro Promotions Ltd. The 3 hour race took place over a 3.5 mi (5.6 km) course of which 1.5 mi (2.4 km) was a flat-out straight along the beach and had 500 participants on motorcycles, quads and sidecars. The race was supported by an arena trial in the adjacent Beach Gardens and a disabled quad race on the beach.

A computerised system was introduced in 1984 to record timings. This misfunctioned and showed the winner as a quad with a 10 lap advantage over the rest of the field. The organisers had to resort to the manual system which led to an 8 hour delay before the winner was announced. In 1985 the disabled quad race was dropped and two qualifying heats for the main race introduced.

The event was called The International Beach Race at Weston-super-Mare in 1986 and the main race split into two. A national race on Saturday and an international race on the Sunday. There were no qualifying heats. The event was run under the FIM International Sporting Code.

In the early 1990s the organisation of the event was taken over by RHL Activities. Its principal, Gareth Hockey, had himself taken part in the inaugural race.

In 1999 the quads and sidecars were split off into their own race.

David Knight won both the solo and quad bike races in 2002.

In 2004 youth races were introduced. In the same year Stefan Everts became the first non-British rider to win the solo race.

There were strong winds and rain over the weekend of the 2009 race. A major crash involving multiple riders happened soon after the start of the main race causing the race to be red flagged. 18 riders were taken to hospital, one of them, Ty Kellett, (Note: Ty Kellett, son of off-road rider Nibs Kellett and brother of Todd Kellett, was taken initially to Weston General Hospital and from there airlifted to Frenchay Hospital in Bristol where he was operated on. The 16 year old suffered severe head and back injuries, a severed liver and a broken leg. Kellett spent 6 weeks in hospital before being released to start rehabilitation. He had recovered enough to take part in fundraising motocross race in May 2010 and the Weston Beach Race in October.) in a critical condition. Emergency services couldn't regroup at the race in time for the race to be restarted run before nightfall so the race was cancelled. A plan to rerun the race the following Sunday was unsuccessful as sufficient medical cover couldn't be arranged at short notice. The crash initially put the future of the race in jeopardy. New safety measures were put in place in 2010 as a result of the crash.

North Somerset Council put the licence to run an autumn beach race out to tender and in February 2011 announced Event 22 had won the contract. RHL Activities owned the rights to the name Weston Beach Race and started negotiations to move the event to nearby Burnham-on-Sea, Brean or Berrow. The issues were resolved and the event stayed at Weston being organised by RHL.

COVID-19 restrictions in the UK caused the 2020 meeting to be cancelled, and the 2021 event to be run on a smaller scale.

In 2023 the National Outdoor Events Association awarded Weston the prestigious Event of the Year – Private Sector award.

A Vintage Race was added to the schedule in 2024. This race was for pre-1993 motorcycles.

The race was originally scheduled to be the third round of the 2024 FIM Sand Races World Cup but was later replaced by the French Ronde des sables de Loon-Plage. When issuing the updated calendar, the FIM hoped to include Weston at a future date.

Storm Amy hit the UK on the weekend of the 2025 race causing Saturday's racing to be cancelled. Competitors and the public were advised to stay away from the site due to 'danger to life'. After a team of volunteers reinstated the facility early on Sunday, a revised schedule for racing was announced. All Saturday's races were run on Sunday. To fit two days races into one day all races were reduced in length.

== Race format ==
Starting with single race, various other races have been added to the event's weekend over the years. The current races are:

- Adult solo race. This has a duration of 3 hours and uses the full course. In addition it has a class within the race:

- Over 40s class for riders over 40.

- Vintage. For riders over 15 and bikes manufactured before 1997. It is run for 1.5 hours and uses part of the course.
- Quad/Sidecars. Duration of 3 hours over the full course. As well as the overall win it also has classes:

- Solo quads
- 2 man quads
- 4x4 quads
- Sidecars

- Youth 65cc. For riders 7-11 years. It lasts 1.25 hours and uses part of the course.
- Youth 85cc. The race lasts 1.5 hours and uses part of the course. It has two classes:

- 85cc small wheel. For riders 9-12 years.
- 85cc big wheel. For riders 11-14 years.

- Youth 125/250. The race lasts 1.5 hours and uses part of the course. It has two classes:

- 125cc. For riders 13-17 years.
- 250cc. For riders 14-17 years.

- There are also women's classes in the adult solo and youth races.

== Course ==
The races take place on a temporary purpose built 7 km (4.3 mi) course on Weston-super-Mare beach south of the Grand Pier. The course starts with a 2 km (1.2 mi) straight near the waters edge before turning into the manmade section. This section includes jumps, rhythm sections and dunes. The manmade section varies each year and includes dunes up to 15 m (49 ft) high. This section takes 10 days to build and involves moving more than 200,000 tonnes of sand. After the event the beach is returned to its original condition in 4 days.

== Results ==
=== Winners 1983–1992 ===
Year	Solos
1983	Willie Simpson
1984	Roger Harvey
1985	Dave Watson
1986	Dave Watson
1987	Jeremy Whatley
1988	Dave Thorpe
1989	Rob Meek
1990	Ryan Hunt
1991	Ryan Hunt
1992	Ryan Hunt

=== Winners 1993–2002 ===
Year	Solos	Quads/sidecars	Quads/sidecars women
1993	Rob Meek	Not run	Not run
1994	Andy Gilbert	Not run	Not run
1995	Rob Meek	Not run	Not run
1996	Rob Meek	Not run	Not run
1997	Rob Meek	Not run	Not run
1998	Mark Hucklebridge	Not run	Not run
1999	David Knight	Craig McCormick	Gaynor Nash
2000	Mark Hucklebridge	David Hammersley	Gaynor Nash
2001	Ben Taylor	Juan Knight	Gaynor Nash
2002	David Knight	David Knight	Gaynor Nash

=== Winners 2003–2012 ===
Year	Solos	Solos over 40	Quads/sidecars	Quads/sidecars women	Quads/sidecars youths	Youths 65 cc	Youths 85 cc	Youths 125/250 cc
2003	Juan Knight	Not run	Paul Winrow	Sue Williams	Not run	Not run	Not run	Not run
2004	Stefan Everts	Not run	Paul Winrow	?	Not run	Not run	Leium Morgan	Not run
2005	Paul Edmunson	Not run	Paul Winrow	?	Gavin Dodds	James Dunn	Jack Cox	Not run
2006	David Knight	Not run	John Natalie	?	?	?	?	Not run
2007	Steve Ramon	Not run	Paul Winrow	Beverley Barnes	?	?	?	Not run
2008	Stefan Everts	Not run	Jeremie Warnia	?	Gavin Dodds	Todd Kellett	Luke Hawkins	Not run
2009	Cancelled	Not run	Jason Macbeth	Beverley Barnes	Harry Timbrell	Conrad Mewse	Matt Bayliss	Not run
2010	David Knight	Jack Twentyman	Jason Wildman	?	Jack Price-Draper	Harry Kimber	Ben Watson	Not run
2011	David Knight	David Salkeld	Paul Winrow	?	?	Jed Etchells	Robert Davidson	Not run
2012	Jeffrey Herlings	?	?	?	Joseph Ruby	Tommy Clarke	Todd Kellett	Ben Watson

=== Winners 2013–2022 ===
Year	Solos	Solos women	Solos over 40	Quads/sidecars	Quads/sidecars youths	Youths 65 cc	Youths 85 cc	Youths 125/250 cc
2013	Graeme Irwin	?	Derry Milling	Carl Bunce	Bailey Edwards	Sam Nunn	Troy Willerton	Robert Davidson
2014	Shaun Simpson	?	?	Carl Bunce	?	Charlie Palmer	?	Tom Neal
2015	Nathan Watson	?	Derry Milling	Sheldon Seal	Oliver Betton	Charlie Palmer	Sam Price	Oliver Benton
2016	Todd Kellett	?	?	Stefan Murphy	Axel Bone	Bailey Johnston	Sam Nunn	Howard Wainwright
2017	Todd Kellett	?	Ton Van Grinsven	Stefan Murphy	?	Louis Vincent	Jens Walvoort	Josh Greedy
2018	Todd Kellett	?	David Knight	Harry Walker	?	Graham Haddow	Jen Walvoort	Rossi Beard
2019	Ashley Greedy	?	David Knight	Jamie Morgan	?	Freddie Gardiner	Charlie Palmer	Jaydon Murphy
2020	Cancelled due to COVID-19 pandemic							
2021	Todd Kellett	Jane Daniels	Derry Milling	Jamie Morgan	Not run	Alfie Geddes-Green	Billy Askew	Alfie Jones
2022	Todd Kellett	Jane Daniels	Derek Bawn	Carl Bunce	Not run	Casey Lister	Josh Vail	Tyler Westcott

=== Winners 2023– ===
Year	Solos	Solos women	Solos over 40	Solos Vintage	Quads/sidecars	Youths 65 cc	Youths 85 cc	Youths 125/250 cc
2023	Todd Kellett	Emily Hall	Derek Bawn	Not run	Steve Atkins	Casey Lister	Drew Stock	Jak Taylor
2024	Conrad Mewse	Lucy Barker	Derek Bawn	Nev Bradshaw	Jamie Morgan	Cohen Jagielski	Blake Ward-Clarke	Reece Jones
2025	Todd Kellett	Lucy Barker	David Knight	Mark Tottle	Harry Walker	Preston Chorley	Casey Lister	Reece Jones

=== Multiple winners ===
Adult solos
Wins	Rider
7	Todd Kellett (Note: Kellett also won the 65cc race in 2008 and the 85cc race in 2012)
6	David Knight (Note: Knight also won the quad race in 2002 and the over 40s solo class three times)
5	Rob Meek
3	Ryan Hunt
2	Dave Watson; Mark Hucklebridge; Stefan Everts

== See also ==
- Beach racing in the UK
- Bibione Sand Storm
- Enduro del Invierno
- Enduro del Verano
- Monte Gordo Sand Race
