= Jean-Claude Moussé =

French motocross and sand racer

- Born: September 2, 1971 (age 55); Épernay, Marne, France
- Occupation: Retired motocross and sand racer
- Teams: Yamaha, Honda, KTM

Championship titles
- Enduro du Touquet winner (1999, 2004, 2012, 2013); French Sand Racing Champion (2011, 2012, 2013)

Jean-Claude Moussé (2 September 1971-) is a retired French motorcycle racer and team manager who specialised in motocross and sand racing. He won the Enduro du Touquet four times and was a three time winner of the French Sand Racing Championship. Moussé is co-organiser of the Beach-Cross de Berck.

== Biography ==
Moussé was born on 2 September 1971 in Épernay, Marne, France. He started riding motorcycles at age 11.

=== Racing career ===
Moussé started competitive riding in 1984 in the Flanders Motocross Championship where he was coached by French motocross rider Jean-Jacques Bruno.

Competing in the French Elite Motocross Championship, he finished eighth in 1994. He also entered the French Supercross Championship in the SX250 class where he finished 12th. In 1996, he moved up to the Motocross World Championship and was 35th in the 500 class. The next year, he finished 29th in the World Clampionship and third in the French Elite Championship. He also finished fifth in the Enduro du Touquet.

Moussé switched to Yamaha in 1998 and decided to concentrate on the sand racing and the French Elite Championship, where he finished sixth. He won the Rond'Europe à Fort-Mahon and was fifth at Le Touquet. In 1999, Moussé won the Enduro du Touquet, the Rond'Europe à Fort-Mahon and the Enduro des Baïnes. He also finished third in the French Elite Championship.

Switching to four-stroke power for 2000, Moussé suffered reliability problems and only managed 15th in the French Elite Championship. The following year, he reverted to a two-stroke Yamaha and finished second at Le Touquet. The 2002 and 2003 seasons failed to bring results, but a switch to Honda in 2004 resulted in Moussé winning his second Enduropale ahead of teammate Timotei Potisek. He rode a KTM in 2005, but switched back to Honda in 2006.

Moussé won the GURP TT de Grayan-et-l'Hôpital in 2010 and at the Enduropale whilst leading at the start of the final lap the clutch went on Moussé's bike. A quick repair in the pit enabled him to finish third. He won the Enduro del Verano that year. The following year, he finished second in the Enduropale, and won the Endurance des Lagunes de Saint-Léger de Balson, the GURP TT de Grayan-et-l'Hôpital and the French Sand Racing Championship.

Moussé switched back to Yamaha for 2012. That year's Enduropale was held under adverse conditions. A snowstorm had hit Le Touquet overnight and there was 100mm of snow on the beach. Although the snow was cleared from the course by the time the race started, the temperature was -5°C. Despite crashing twice in the final laps, Moussé took the win. The victory sealed his winning of the French Sand Racing Championship. The following year, bad weather hit the Enduropale again, this time wind and rain. The winds caused the tide to come in faster than expected causing parts of the course to be under water and race was shortened by 50 minutes. Moussé was in the lead on the final lap and crashed just before the line and Milko Potisek took the flag. After an hour's deliberation, the organisers decided that as the red flag had already been shown the results should be taken from the end of the previous lap, giving Moussé his fourth victory in the event. The victory secured his winning of the French Sand Racing Championship for the third year running.

Also in 2013, Moussé competed in the Enduro Maya Marseille Maroc, a six day event with special stages starting in Marseille and then moving on to the Moroccan desert, including the dunes of Merzouga. Moussé was leading after the first day in Morocco and eventually finished third in the competition.

Now aged 44, Moussé announced his retirement at the end of 2015, stating that the 2016 Enduropale would be his last race. He finished the race sixth.

=== Post-retirement ===
After retiring from top-level riding, Moussé became head of the Off-Road Sports Program for Yamaha France until he stepped down in 2023. Moussé also started designing the course for the Beach-Cross de Berck, and in 2024 Moussé, along with Denis Guérin, promoter of the French Sand Racing Championship, took over organising the event.

Although retired from racing, Moussé continues to compete in the Vintage class at Le Touquet.
