= Nathan Watson =

British motorcycle racer

- Born: 10 May 1994 (age 32); Nottingham, England
- Current team: Beta Factory Enduro team

Motocross World Championship
- Years active: 2013-2015, 2020-2021
- Teams: HM Plant KTM UK; Dantec Husqvarna; RedBull IceOne Husqvarna Factory Racing; Honda SR Motoblouz
- Best finish: 23rd in 2015

Enduro World Championship
- Years active: 2016-2017, 2021-
- Teams: Beta Factory Enduro Team
- Former teams: Factory KTM team; Honda Racing RedMoto
- Best finish: 4th in 2022

World Enduro Super Series
- Years active: 2018-2019
- Teams: Red Bull KTM Factory Racing
- Best finish: 3rd in 2018

French Sand Racing Championship
- Years active: 2017/2018-2019/2020
- Teams: Red Bull KTM Factory Racing
- Starts: 17
- Championships: 2 (2018/2019, 2019/2020)
- Wins: 10

Nathan Watson (10 May 1994-) is a British motocross, enduro and sand racer. He is a twice French Sand Racing Champion.

== Biography ==
Watson was born on 10 May 1994 in Nottingham, England. He comes from a motorcycling family. His father Rob Meek is a multiple Weston Beach Race winner and his younger brother Ben competes in the FIM Motocross World Championship.

=== Career ===
After starting competitive racing at club level at the age of nine, Watson moved up to national races in 2006. In 2009 he was the winner of the BW85cc Red Bull Elite Youth Cup. Moving up to the 250 cc (15 cu in) class, he won the BYMX and RBEYC Rookie titles.

Watson won the Skegness Beach Race in 2012 and again in 2013.

In 2013, Watson competed in the British Motocross Champion in the MX2 class, he won the Hawkstone Park round and finished the season in 6th place. Moving up to MX1 for 2014, Watson won the class racing for Danetc Husqvarna UK. He was drafted into Kimi Raikkonen's Red Bull IceOne Racing Husqvarna team as a replacement rider for the 2014 GP of Germany, where he qualified fourth. His performance earned him a full time ride with the team in 2015. In April Watson was injured during a race in the ADAC MX Master Series in Germany and required surgery on a fractured bone in his wrist. The injury caused him to miss several MXGP races. He finished the season 10th Overall in MXGP.

After several attempts in previous years, Watson won the Weston Beach Race in 2015.

For 2016, Watson switched from MX to Enduro joining the Factory KTM team and competing in the Assoluti d’Italia (Italian Enduro Championship) and the Enduro World Championship where he finished second in the E1 class. In 2017, he finished third in the E2 class. He won the Skegness Beach Race for the third time in 2016.

Watson also competed in the 2017/2018 French Sand Racing Championship (CFS) for KTM, winning three of the six races.

With the Red Bull KTM Factory Racing team switching allegiance from the Enduro World Championship to the newly created World Enduro Super Series (WESS), Watson competed in the WESS in 2018, finishing third in the series, and seventh in 2019.

After coming second in the two previous runnings of the Red Bull Knock Out, Watson won the event in 2018.

Watson was the first British rider to win the Enduropale du Touquet in 2019. The win clinched the 2018/2019 French Sand Racing Championship (CFS) title. He repeated winning the CFS title in the 2019/2020 season.

Watson was chosen to compete for Great Britain in the 2019 Motocross des Nations held at TT Circuit Assen, Netherlands. The circuit was covered with sand for the event. The British team finished third overall.

In 2020, Watson left KTM and signed with the Honda France SR Motoblouz team to become the lead rider of their new second team created to compete in the French Sand Racing Championship. Watson competed in the final 2 races of the 2021 FIM Enduro World Championship for RedMoto Honda. Racing full time in the 2022 season, Watson finished fourth overall in the EnduroGP and third in the E2 category.

In 2023, Watson competed in the Assoluti d’Italia (Italian Enduro Championship) as well as the Enduro World Championship in which he finished sixth overall in the EnduroGP and fourth in the E2 category.

In 2024, Watson signed for the Betamotor and joined Brad Freeman in the Factory Enduro Team to compete in the EnduroGP World Championship. In 2026, he is competing in the ACU British Sprint Enduro Championship for the Beta Factory Enduro team.

== Results ==
=== French Sand Racing Championship ===
(key)

French Sand Racing Championship
Year	Bike	BER	LOO	BAL	HOS	GRA	TOU	Pos.	Points	Source
2017/2018	KTM	5	1	?	1	1	2	2nd	?	
2018/2019	KTM	2		1	1	1	1	1st	735	
2019/2020	KTM	2	1	1	2	1	3	1st	845	
