= French Sand Racing Championship =

- Category: Motorcycle racing
- Country: France
- Inaugural season: 2005
- Current champions: Motos: Todd Kellett; Quads: Harry Walker
- Official website: www.courses-sur-sable.fr

The French Sand Racing Championship (fr:Championnat de France des sables) (CFS) is a sand racing competition for motorcycles and quads run annually between October and February. It was created by the French Motorcycling Federation (FFM) in 2005. Although a national championship, it attracts many international riders.

== History ==
The Bud Sand Race à Magescq was added to the calendar in 2019.

Swedish group Pierce AB/24MX had been the title sponsor for a number of years. Following a downturn in trade due to COVID-19 they withdrew their sponsorship. Motocross parts and accessory manufacturer 3AS Racing took over sponsorship for the 2021 championship. Their owner, Frédéric Lemeunier, was the creator of the Berck Beach-cross.

With COVID-19 restrictions in place in France the 2020/2021 championship was cancelled.

Following disagreements between the FFM and the race organisers, the Bud Sand Race à Magescq was dropped from the championship in December 2023.

There was a fuel shortage in France in October 2022 as a result of oil refinery workers striking leading to the opening round of the CFS, the Berck Beach-Cross, to be cancelled.

A vintage category was added in 2023.

Motoblouz, a french motorcycle accessories manufacturer, became the title sponsor of the championship in 2025.

== Races ==
The calendar consists of the following rounds:

1. Beach-Cross de Berck
2. Ronde des Sables de Loon Plage
3. Endurance des Lagunes de Saint-Léger de Balson
4. Ronde des Sables Hossegor-Capbreton
5. GURP TT de Grayan-et-l'Hôpital
6. Enduropale du Touquet

Each race lasts 2.5 to 3 hours with the exception of the Beach-Cross de Berck which has two 30 minutes heats and a 30 minutes final.

== Categories ==
The championship is divided into six categories. There are a number of classes within each category:

CFS Motos
Class	Age	Technical
CFS-1	18+	251–650 cc (15.3–39.7 cu in) 4T
CFS-2	18+	175–500 cc (10.7–30.5 cu in) 2T
CFS-3	18+	100–150 cc (6.1–9.2 cu in) 2T, 100–250 cc (6.1–15.3 cu in) 4T
CFS-F (Females)	18+	100–500 cc (6.1–30.5 cu in) 2T, 100–650 cc (6.1–39.7 cu in) 4T
CFS-V (Veterans)	38+	100–500 cc (6.1–30.5 cu in) 2T, 100–650 cc (6.1–39.7 cu in) 4T
CFS Juniors
125 2T	13-19	100–125 cc (6.1–7.6 cu in) 2T
250 4T	15-19	100–250 cc (6.1–15.3 cu in) 4T
CFS Espoirs
85 2T	11-16	max 85 cc (5.2 cu in) 2T
CFS Vintage
V1	18+	pre-1997 single shock absorber
V2	18+	pre-1997 twin shock absorber
CFS Quads
Scratch	15-17	max 550 cc (34 cu in) 2T or 4T
Scratch	18+	unlimited capacity
Quad series	15-17	max 550 cc (34 cu in) 2T or 4T
Quad series	18+	unlimited capacity
Females	15-17	max 550 cc (34 cu in) 2T or 4T
Females	18+	unlimited capacity
Veterans	38+	max 550 cc (34 cu in) 2T or 4T
Vintage	15-19	pre-2004, unlimited capacity
Amateur Trophy
Scratch	18+	100–500 cc (6.1–30.5 cu in) 2T, 100–650 cc (6.1–39.7 cu in) 4T
Females	18+	100–500 cc (6.1–30.5 cu in) 2T, 100–650 cc (6.1–39.7 cu in) 4T

== Champions ==
Year	Motorcycles		Quads	
Year	Rider	Make	Rider	Make
2005	(France) Arnaud Demeester	Yamaha	Not run	
2006	(France) Arnaud Demeester	Yamaha	Not run	
2007	(France) Arnaud Demeester	Yamaha	Not run	
2008	(France) Timoteï Potisek	Honda	Not run	
2009	(France) Yves Deudon	Kawasaki	Not run	
2010	(France) Adrien van Beveren	Yamaha	(France) Romain Couprie	Yamaha
2011	(France) Jean-Claude Moussé	Yamaha	(Belgium) Jan Vlaeymens	W-Tec
2012	(France) Jean-Claude Moussé	Yamaha	(France) Matthieu Ternynck	Yamaha
2013	(France) Jean-Claude Moussé	Yamaha	(France) Matthieu Ternynck	Yamaha
2014	(France) Adrien van Beveren	Yamaha	(France) Keveen Rochereau	Honda
2015	(France) Adrien van Beveren	Yamaha	(France) Jérémie Warnia	Yamaha
2016	(France) Camille Chapelière	Yamaha	(France) Jérémie Warnia	Yamaha
2017	(Belgium) Daymond Martens	Yamaha	(France) Jérémy Forestier	Yamaha
2018	(Belgium) Axel van de Sande	Kawasaki	(France) Jérémy Forestier	Yamaha
2019	(United Kingdom) Nathan Watson	KTM	(France) Antoine Cheurlin	Yamaha
2020	(United Kingdom) Nathan Watson	KTM	(France) Romain Couprie	Yamaha
2021	Not run (COVID-19)			
2022	(France) Milko Potisek	Yamaha	(France) Davino Bruneel	Yamaha
2023	(United Kingdom) Todd Kellett	Yamaha	(Belgium) Randy Naveaux	Yamaha
2024	(United Kingdom) Todd Kellett	Yamaha	(France) Keveen Rochereau	Honda
2025	(United Kingdom) Todd Kellett	Yamaha	(United Kingdom) Harry Walker	Dragon Quad Racing
