= Arnaud Demeester =

French motorcycle racer

- Born: November 25, 1973 (age 52); Dunkirk, Nord Department, France
- Nickname: Sandman
- Occupation: Motorcycle sand racer
- Teams: Yamaha Motors France, Sherco, CAP Racing

Championship titles
- French Sand Racing Champion (2005, 2006, 2007); Winner Enduro du Touquet (1995, 1996, 1998, 2002, 2007, 2008, 2011); German Cross-Country Champion (2005,2006)

Arnaud Michel Jean Demeester (born 25 November 1973), known as the Sandman, is a French motorcycle rider who specialises in sand racing. He has won the French Sand Racing Championship three times and the Enduro du Touquet (later named Enduropale) a record seven times. Although retired from top class racing, he continues to compete in the vintage class of the Enduropale.

== Biography ==
Demeester was born on 25 November 1973 in Dunkirk, France and was introduced to motorcycling by a friend of his parents. He started competing in junior category races in 1986.

In 1989, Demeester entered the Enduro du Touquet. Being only fifteen, he was too young to enter so entered under his father's name. Riding a 125 that was too big for him he finished 227th. The following year, he lied about his age to enter and finished 52nd. The same year, 1990, he finished tenth in the French Junior Championship.

In 1992, Demeester won his first major sand race, the Rond'Europe à Fort-Mahon, on a Suzuki. His riding caught the attention of Jean-Claude Olivier, head of Yamaha Motors France, who offered Demeester a place as an official rider for the team. Demeester came seventh in the Enduro du Touquet in 1994, and the following year, won the event for the first time, becoming the youngest ever winner of the event. He also competed in motocross 1995 and came sixth in the French Elite Championship. He won in Le Touquet for the second time in 1996.

Demeester suffered a fractured ulna during training in early January 1999. Eager to compete at Le Touquet he underwent surgery to insert a metal plate. Riding in pain in the race he finished second but the plate in his arm had failed requiring further surgery and a bone graft. Whilst training at Equihen-Plage in 2000, he felt that something was wrong with his arm. Xrays revealed a further break requiring another graft.

In 2005, Demeester won the inaugural French Sand Racing Championship (CFS), winning it again in 2006 and 2007. He also won the German Cross-Country Championship in 2005 and 2006.

Demeester won at Le Touquet a record seventh time in 2008 and announced his retirement from racing. He took over the management of two vehicle inspection centres and a car wash in Dunkirk.

In 2011, Demeester came out of retirement and won the Ronde des Sables Hossegor-Capbreton. At Le Touquet, he finished fifth on a Yamaha for the HFP Racing team. The next season, he announced that due to problems with his knees he would retire after the Enduropale. However, bad weather caused the Le Touquet course to be covered in snow and Demeester decided it was too dangerous to compete.

To celebrate the 20th anniversary of his first win at Le Touquet on a two stroke, Demeester tried to organise a ride on a two stroke bike for the 2015. His first choice, Yamaha, are unable to offer a big enough budget. French manufacturer Sherco, who want to establish themselves in motocross, contacted Demeester to form a team to develop the bike and become a young rider academy. The season goes well with Demeester regularly getting top ten finishes. At Le Touquet he has to retire due to a water leak whilst in fifth position. Continuing with Sherco in 2016, he suffered a heavy fall during trading at Loon-Plage breaking 5 ribs. He recovered enough to complete at the Enduropale where he finished 7th. Sherco are unable to provide funding for 2017 and the team folds.

In 2017, Demeester and former teammate Fred Vialle form CAP Racing to support Vialle's son Tom in his racing. Julien Duhamel also joined the team with Demeester riding a Yamaha and the youngsters riding KTMs. Demeester crashed heavily at Hossegor breaking his wrist and had to sit out the rest of the season.

Demeester became the team manager of the KTM North Europe Racing in 2018, coaching their two riders Petar Petrov and Jeffrey Dewulf. In 2022, Demeester started coaching brothers Florian and Mathéo Miot with support from the Vitamine H dealership who supplied them with 450 cc GasGas bikes to compete in the French Sand Racing Championship.

Competing in the vintage class, for pre-1996 bikes, of the Enduropale Demeester finished second in 2023, 3rd in 2024 and 3rd in 2025.

== Racing record ==
Year	Results
1989	227th Enduro du Touquet
1990	52nd Enduro du Touquet; 10th French Junior Championship
1992	Winner Rond'Europe à Fort-Mahon
1994	7th Enduro du Touquet
1995	Winner Enduro du Touquet; 6th French Elite Motocross Championship
1996	Winner Enduro du Touquet; Winner Enduro des Baïnes
1997	2nd Enduro du Touquet; Winner Enduro des Baïnes; 2nd French Elite Motocross 250 Championship
1998	Winner Enduro du Touquet; Winner Ronde des Sables Hossegor-Capbreton; 8th French Elite Motocross Championship
1999	2nd Enduro du Touquet
2000	2nd Enduro du Touquet; Winner Rond'Europe à Fort-Mahon
2001	Winner Rond'Europe à Fort-Mahon; Winner Ronde des Sables de Loon Plage
2002	Winner Enduro du Touquet; Winner GURP TT de Grayan-et-l'Hôpital
2003	Winner GURP TT de Grayan-et-l'Hôpital; Winner Ronde des Sables de Loon Plage
2004	Winner Hossego Enduro; Winner GURP TT de Grayan-et-l'Hôpital; Winner Rond'Europe à Fort-Mahon; Winner Ronde des Sables de Loon Plage; Winner of the Sand Trophy
2005	Winner French Sand Racing Championship; Winner German Cross-Country Championship; Winner Enduro du Touquet; Winner GURP TT de Grayan-et-l'Hôpital; Winner Hossego Enduro; Winner Ronde des Sables de Loon Plage; Winner Rond'Europe à Fort-Mahon; 10th French Elite Motocross Open Championship
2006	Winner French Sand Racing Championship; Winner German Cross-Country Championship; 4th Enduropale du Touquet; Winner Rond'Europe à Fort-Mahon
2007	Winner French Sand Racing Championship; Winner Enduro du Touquet; Winner Ocean Race in St Georges de Didonne
2008	Winner Enduropale du Touquet; Winner Endurance des Lagunes de Saint-Léger de Balson
2011	5th Enduropale du Touquet; Winner Ronde des Sables Hossegor-Capbreton
2016	7th Enduropale du Touquet
2023	2nd Enduropale du Touquet Vintage Race
2024	3rd Enduropale du Touquet Vintage Race
2025	3rd Enduropale du Touquet Vintage Race
