= Skegness Beach Race =

Motorcycle and quad race

- Location: Skegness, Lincolnshire, England; 53.1446888°N 0.3444632°E
- First race: 2010
- Last race: 2022
- Most wins (rider): Nathan Watson (2); Dan Thornhill (2)

Circuit information
- Surface: Sand
- Length: 5 km (3.1 mi)

The Skegness Beach Race was an annual beach race that was run a temporary course on the sandy beach of Skegness, Lincolnshire from 2010 to 2022. It was organised by the Amateur Motor Cycle Association (AMCA) in conjunction with the East Lindsey District Council and East Lindsey Event Safety Advisory Group (ELESAG). Throughout its history the event suffered from lack of funding.

== History ==
Initially an agreement was made between the involved parties to run the event annually for three years. The inaugural event took place on the 11 & 12 December 2010. Earth-moving machinery took a week to build the 4.2 km (2.6 mi) course which included jumps, mounds, waves, chicanes and fast straights. Four races took place: kids (age 9 -15 years), MX2 Youth (18 and under), adult motorcycles and a combined quad/sidecar race. Races were 1 hour long for the kids' race, 1.5 hours for the MX2 Youth and quad/sidecar races and 3 hours for the fault solos. It was billed as the AMCA Skegness Masters Beach Race and was a stand-alone event within the Wulfsport British Masters Motocross Series. The event was free for spectators and an estimated 14,000 people attended.

A veterans class was added to the main race in 2011, which was won by Anthony Dean. Nathan Parker won the main race with Nathan Watson second. Watson's younger brother Ben won the MXY2 race. The quad/sidecar race was won by David Vass.

Nathan Watson won the race in 2012 with brother Ben coming second. Ben also won the MXY2 race. An estimated 20,000 spectators attended.

The course was redesigned and made slightly longer for 2013 and races run in the opposite direction to previous years. A clubmans race, lasting for 1.5 hours, was added with classes for Clubman Youth, Clubman Over 18, Clubman Over 40 and Clubman Over 50.

The course was again lengthened in 2014 and there was an overall entry list of over 300 riders.

Around 25,000 people watched the event in 2017.

A 5 metre colour screen was erected on the promenade in 2018 to show the leader board during the event.

The event was cancelled in 2020 due to the COVID-19 pandemic.

In 2021 strong winds in the North Sea overnight created a tidal surge which flooded part of the circuit. Earth-moving machinery created trenches and gullies to drain the circuit. The start of the main race was delayed 30 minutes and the race shortened to 2.5 hours.

In June 2023 the AMCA announced that the 2023 event was cancelled due to lack of funding, and that they were hoping to attract sponsors to be able to run the race in 2024.

== Results ==
Winners
Year	Motorcycles	Quads/sidecars
2010	(France) Milko Potisek	
2011	(United Kingdom) Nathan Parker - KTM	(United Kingdom) David Vass - Suzuki
2012	(United Kingdom) Nathan Watson - Husqvarna	(United Kingdom) Stefan Murphy
2013	(United Kingdom) Nathan Watson - Husqvarna	(United Kingdom) Stefan Murphy
2014	(United Kingdom) Dan Thornhill - Husqvarna	(United Kingdom) Bailey Edwards
2015	(United Kingdom) James Hutchinson - KTM	(United Kingdom) Bailey Edwards
2016	(United Kingdom) Nathan Watson - KTM	(United Kingdom) Oliver Sansom
2017	(France) Milko Potisek	(United Kingdom) Harry Walker
2018	(United Kingdom) Todd Kellett - Husqvarna	(United Kingdom) Harry Walker
2019	(United Kingdom) Todd Kellett - Yamaha	(United Kingdom) Harry Walker
2020	Not run - COVID-19	
2021	(United Kingdom) Dan Thornhill - Yamaha	(United Kingdom) Sheldon Seal
2022	(United Kingdom) Dan Thornhill - Husqvarna	(United Kingdom) Lestyn Rowlands
