= Beach racing in the UK =

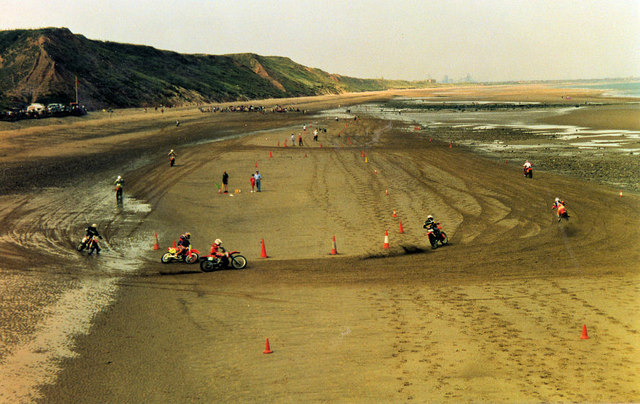
Beach racing Saltburn Sands 1997

Beach racing in the UK has a long history, the first events starting in the early 1900s. Unlike in mainland Europe, racing on public roads was illegal in the UK. Hillclimbs and speed trials, where competitors compete against the clock off the public roads became popular. Seaside towns became interested as a means of drawing visitors to the town. In towns with wide sandy beaches competitors could compete side by side rather than singly against the clock. With the introduction of more permanent racetracks after WW2 beach racing went into decline, however in recent times a number of new events have been introduced. In December 2024 it was announced that the ACU in conjunction with RHL Activities, the organisers of the Weston Beach Race, were to launch the ACU British Sand Racing Championship, starting in 2026. There is also a British Beachcross Championship organized by the Quad Racing Association.

== Current races/venues ==
=== Barmouth Beach Race ===
The Barmouth Beach Race is an annual motocross event for motorcycles and quads that takes place in Barmouth, Gwynedd, Wales. The weekend event takes place on a 2 mi (3.2 km) temporary course on the beach in front of Barmouth Lifeboat Station. It is organised by the Wilden MXC.

=== Bibbys Beach Track ===
Occasional events have taken place since 2009 in Ingoldmells, Lincolnshire on a private beach owned by Joe's Beach Bar. In 2003 the track was relaunched as Bibbys Beach Track, Joe's Beach Bar having become Bibbys Beach Bar.

=== Mablethorpe Sand Racing ===
First run in 1970, Mablethorpe Sand Racing is a series of races that are run annually on the beach at Mablethorpe, Lincolnshire between October and March. The races for motorcycles and quads take place on a 0.5 miles (0.80 km) oval track.

=== Malle Beach Race ===
The Malle Beach Race is an annual event that takes place in Margate, Kent. Sponsored by motorcycle accessories manufacturer Malle, it was first run in 2020. The theme of the event is 'run-what-you-brung'. Races include an 1/8 mile sprint, a 1/4 mile 'double' where riders have to run in both directions, a flat track race with a Le Mans start and motorcycle polo.

=== Margate Beach Cross ===
Margate Beach Cross, a beachcross racing event, takes place twice a year, usually in March and October, in Margate, Kent. The event, which is organised by QRAUK in conjunction with Island Events and Thanet District Council, has proven to be popular with not only British riders but with a huge number of riders from the Continent. The event has both quads and solos racing around a specially prepared course on Margate's main sands and it attracts many thousands of visitors.

=== Race the Waves ===
The Race the Waves takes place on Bridlington, Yorkshire's South Beach. It is honour of the Land Speed Record attempts that previously took place on Yorkshire's beaches. The event is a series of 200 yd (180 m) drag races between veteran vehicles. Cars race in pairs and motorcycles in fours or fives. The event was first run in 2018.

=== Skegness Beach Race ===
First run in 2010, the Skegness Beach Race takes place annually on the beach at Skegness, Lincolnshire. The event, organised by the Amateur Motor Cycle Association (AMCA), transforms the beach into a series of jumps and deep corners and features various races for motorcycles and quads.

=== Weston Beach Race ===
The Weston Beach Race (originally called Enduro du Super Mare) is an annual sand race held on the beach at Weston-super-Mare, Somerset over a weekend, usually in October, which has been running since 1983. It is one of the largest off-road motorcycle events in Britain and is run on a temporary purpose built course. Open to both amateur and professional riders on motorcycles, quads and sidecars, it regularly attracts over 1,000 participants and attracts crowds of 100,000.

=== Weymouth Beach Motocross ===
First run in 1984, the 2 day event transforms a 1 mi (1.6 km) section of the beach at Weymouth, Dorset into a motocross course. Around 300 riders take part in various categories. The event, which is run by the Purbeck Motocross Club with part of the entry fees and programme sales going to the Weymouth and Portland Lions Club to fund their charity works.

== Former races/venues ==
=== ACU British Sand Masters Championship ===
In 2006 the Guernsey Motorcycle & Car Club started the Sand Ace Championship for motorcycles and sidecars at Vazon Bay, Guernsey. The championship was granted national status in 2012 becoming the SandAce ACU British Championship. Title sponsor Condor Ferries temporarily suspended ferry services to Guernsey during the period the event was to take place and it lost its national status. The event was run as the Battle of the Beach. Racing was suspended during the COVID-19 pandemic and after COVID the Guernsey Club decided not to continue with the championship. The Cheshire Grasstrack Club (CGC) organised a new championship for 2022 at Lytham St Annes, Lancashire called the ACU British Sand Masters Championship. The championship was run the following year but not after that.

=== Druridge Bay ===
The Northern Speed Trials were held at Druridge Bay, Northumberland in 1926. In the 1950s and 60's races were organised by the Seaton Delaval and District Motor Club and the Newcastle and District Motor Club. The Newcastle speedway team used the beach for practice in the 1960s.

=== Filey ===
The beach at Filey, Yorkshire was the location of the first attempt at the Land Speed Record on sand in 1905.

=== Pendine Sands ===
In the 1900s Pendine Sands, Carmarthen Bay, Wales were used for car and motorcycle racing. From 1924 to 1927 several attempts at the Land Speed Record by Malcolm Campbell, John Parry-Thomas, Guilo Foresti and others. Attempts at Motorcycle Land Speed Records we also carried out by George Brown and Bob Berry in the 1950s.

=== Ramsgate ===
Rounds of the Beach Cross UK Championship (BXUK) were held on a temporary course built on the Main sands at Ramsgate, Kent in 2010 and 2011.

=== Redcar ===
After WW2 and Saltburn Sands being rendered unsuitable by a storm in 1938, racing was transferred to the sands at Coatham, Redcar, Yorkshire. Starting in 1946 a mixture of speed trials and racing was held organised by the Middlesbrough and District Motor Club. These continued until 1955. Local enthusiast Ernie Crust resurrected motorcycle racing on the beach in 1962 and these races continued until the 1980s.

=== Saltburn Sands ===
The sands at Saltburn, Yorkshire were first used for speed trials in 1906. In 1908 Algernon Lee Guinness set a new World Speed Record of 121 mph (195 km/h) at the speed trial. When the event resumed after WW1, Malcolm Campbell raised the record to 138 mph (222 km/h) but this was not officially recognised. Motorcycle races were staged from 1924 until a storm in 1938 reduced the area of sand on the beach. After WW2 motorcycle races were held in the late 1940s and early 1950s.

=== Weston-super-Mare ===
The first event at Weston-super-Mare was run in 1913 and organised by the Somerset Automobile Club and the Bristol Motorcycle Club. After WW1, the Somerset club were no longer interested in the event and the Bristol club revived the event in 1919 for motorcycles. The event was also run in 1920 but after that the Bristol club withdrew and the event was no longer run.

In 1970 the Weston-super-Mare organised a 'Sandocross' event where four competitors at a time competed. This race was run annually until 2014.

The Weston Beach Race was first run in 1983 and has continued to be run since then.

== See also ==
- Beach racing in France
- Sand racing in Mazagan
