= Enduropale du Touquet =

French motorcycle race

Enduropale du Touquet Pas-de-Calais
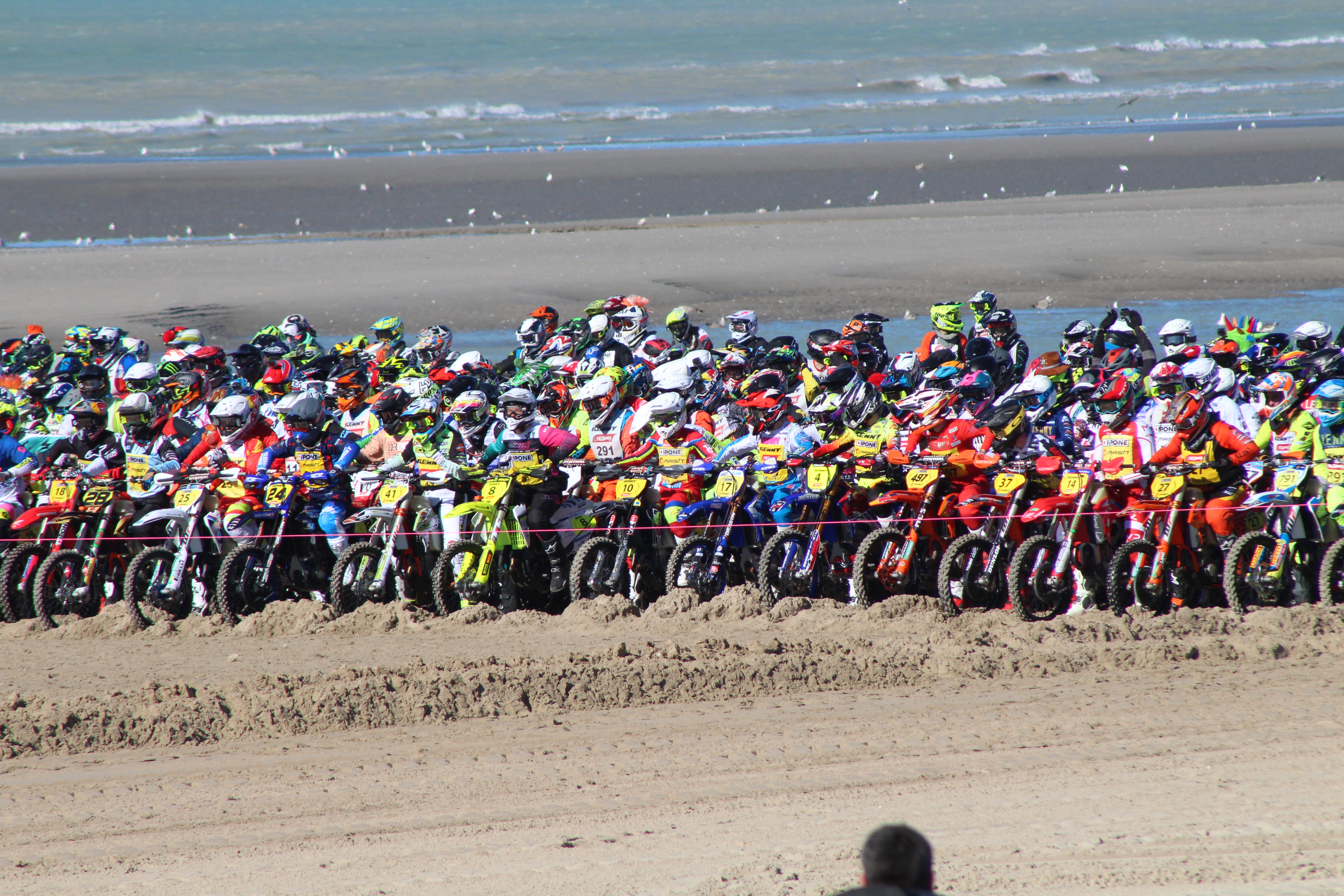
- L'Enduropale in 2022
- Sport: Motorcycle beach racing
- Round of: Championnat de France des sables FIM Sand Races World Championship
- Location: Le Touquet-Paris-Plage; Stella-Plage; Pas-de-Calais France
- Race distance: 15 km (9.3 mi)
- First run: 1975
- Former names: Enduro des Sables; Enduro du Touquet
- Participants: 2,761 including 54 women 1,308 in the main event (2024)
- Spectators: 600,000
- Website: www.enduropaledutouquet.fr

Winners
- 2026 winner (men): (United Kingdom) Todd Kellett
- 2026 winner (women): (France) Mathilde Martinez
- Most wins (men): (France) Arnaud Demeester (7)
- Most wins (women): (Belgium) Amandine Verstappen (3)

The Enduropale, or Enduropale du Touquet Pas-de-Calais (called Enduro des Sables in its first year and Enduro du Touquet until 2005), is a motorcycle race held annually since 1975 at the beginning of the year on the Opal Coast on the beaches of Le Touquet-Paris-Plage and Stella-Plage in the Pas-de-Calais region. It has now become the largest enduro race in Europe and the longest sand race in the world at 15km. It is the finale of the French Sand Racing Championship (Championnat de France des sables) (CFS).

Since 2023 the Enduropale has been a round of the Sand Races World Championship, organized by the International Motorcycling Federation (FIM), which was inaugurated in that year,

For the 50th anniversary in 2025, the circuit for the main event was extended from 13 to 15 km (9.3 mi).

== History ==
While watching the 1971 documentary On Any Sunday, which highlights off-road motorcycling in wide-open spaces, Thierry Sabine, communications officer at Le Touquet town hall, had the idea of bringing the mass-participation enduro races that were very popular in the United States to France. The first running of the event, named the Enduro des Sables, took place on 16 February 16, 1975 with 286 competitors. The "Touquet" was initially run in two heats. It was the experience and success achieved at the Enduro du Touquet that motivated Thierry Sabine to create the Paris-Dakar Rally in 1979, based on the same principle of competition open to all.

Until 1981, the course of the race called "Enduro des sables" was partly run in the dunes, then following complaints from nature protection associations, the race was run on the beach exclusively. (Note: The French Federation of Nature Protection Societies welcomes the announcement made by Michel Crépeau, Minister of the Environment, to ban the "Enduro des Sables" motorcycle race in the dunes of Le Touquet: "The dunes constitute a living environment of the greatest interest. the specific plants, perennial species such as sand couch grass and sea purslane play a crucial role in the formation of the dune, while marram grass, thanks to its powerful roots, contributes to dune stabilization. But this very interesting environment is also very fragile. With a circuit like the "Enduro des Sables," 25 hectares are completely destroyed and 60 hectares of dunes over a length of 10 to 15 km are severely degraded by the entire event")

The year 1991, the Gulf War prevented the event from being organized.

In 2005, Amaury Sport Organisation, owner of TSO (Thierry Sabine Organisation), withdrew from organizing the race. For two years the French Motorcycling Federation took over organising the event.

Frenchman Mickaël Kavaliauskas entered the 2008 event on a Honda CBR900RR Fireblade modified as a motocross machine. He won the holeshot and was timed at an average speed over 200 km/h (120 mph) along the beach.

The competition has become a major event at the European level, with 2,450 competitors (in 2020) and 500,000 visitors.

The 2021 event was cancelled due to the Covid-19 pandemic.

The 2022 event, initially scheduled for the 28-30 January, was postponed due to the Covid-19 pandemic to 25-27 February.

In 2023, the premier motorcycle event, the Enduropale, took place for the first time on Saturday instead of Sunday, the usual day since 1975 due to the time of high tide. The Enduropale was included in the first World Cup of Sand Racing, organised by the FIM, and was the first round of this World Cup which consisted of three events, with the Enduro del Verano in Argentina (Note: This event takes place in Villa Gesell, a town twinned with Le Touquet-Paris-Plage) at the end of February and the Monte Gordo Beach Algarve in Portugal, in the town of Monte Gordo in November. The main race returned to Sunday in 2024.

== Economic benefits ==
As the event is free, the municipality's revenue comes from partnerships (32 in 2022), fees for street vendors and an of entry fee of €300 per participant.

For the 2022 event, the municipality of Le Touquet-Paris-Plage estimated the economic impact, at the local and regional level, at €6.3 million, of which €4.8 million is for the organizing municipality. The occupancy rate of the town's hotels (1,100 rooms) is 100% during the three days of the Enduropale.

== Rankings ==
=== Men's category ===
Year	Enduro du Touquet / Enduropale		Quaduropale		Enduro Juniors		Enduro Espoirs		Enduro Vintage	
Year	Rider	Constructor	Rider	Constructor	Rider	Constructor	Rider	Constructor	Rider	Constructor
1975	(France) Jacques Vernier	Ossa	Not run		Not run		Not run		Not run	
1976	(France) Daniel Péan	Maico	Not run		Not run		Not run		Not run	
1977	(France) Gilles Francru	Husqvarna	Not run		Not run		Not run		Not run	
1978	(France) Patrick Drobecq	Husqvarna	Not run		Not run		Not run		Not run	
1979	(Sweden) Håkan Carlqvist	Husqvarna	Not run		Not run		Not run		Not run	
1980	(France) Serge Bacou	Yamaha	Not run		Not run		Not run		Not run	
1981	(France) Jean-Paul Mingels	Yamaha	Not run		Not run		Not run		Not run	
1982	(Netherlands) Kees van der Ven	KTM	Not run		Not run		Not run		Not run	
1983	(Netherlands) Kees van der Ven	KTM	Not run		Not run		Not run		Not run	
1984	(Netherlands) Kees van der Ven	KTM	Not run		Not run		Not run		Not run	
1985	(Netherlands) Kees van der Ven	KTM	Not run		Not run		Not run		Not run	
1986	(Netherlands) Kees van der Ven	KTM	Not run		Not run		Not run		Not run	
1987	(Sweden) Leif Persson	Yamaha	Not run		Not run		Not run		Not run	
1988	(Belgium) Eric Geboers	Honda	Not run		Not run		Not run		Not run	
1989	(Belgium) Eric Geboers	Honda	Not run		Not run		Not run		Not run	
1990	(Belgium) Eric Geboers	Honda	Not run		Not run		Not run		Not run	
1991	Event cancelled (Gulf War)		Not run		Not run		Not run		Not run	
1992	(France) Yann Guédard	Kawasaki	Not run		Not run		Not run		Not run	
1993	(Belgium) Gérald Delepine	Honda	Not run		Not run		Not run		Not run	
1994	(France) Jérôme Belval	Honda	Not run		Not run		Not run		Not run	
1995	(France) Arnaud Demeester	Yamaha	Not run		Not run		Not run		Not run	
1996	(France) Arnaud Demeester	Yamaha	Not run		Not run		Not run		Not run	
1997	(France) David Hauquier	Honda	(France) Pascal Rochereau (Switzerland) Jean-Charles Tonus	Yamaha	Not run		Not run		Not run	
1998	(France) Arnaud Demeester	Yamaha	(Netherlands) Wilhelmus Van Der Laan (France) Éric Gaillard	KTM	Not run		Not run		Not run	
1999	(France) Jean-Claude Moussé	Yamaha	(France) Pascal Rochereau (Switzerland) Jean-Charles Tonus	Yamaha	Not run		Not run		Not run	
2000	(France) Thierry Béthy	Honda	(France) Gilles Abgrall (Netherlands) Alex Brusselers	EML	Not run		Not run		Not run	
2001	(France) Thierry Béthy	Honda	(France) Pascal Rochereau (United Kingdom) Paul Winrow	Yamaha	Not run		Not run		Not run	
2002	(France) Arnaud Demeester	Yamaha	(France) Blaise Parent (France) Vincent Pinchon	Yamaha	Not run		Not run		Not run	
2003	(France) Thierry Béthy	Honda	(France) Blaise Parent (France) Vincent Pinchon	Yamaha	Not run		Not run		Not run	
2004	(France) Jean-Claude Moussé	Honda	(France) Romain Couprie (France) Pascal De Palma	Yamaha	Not run		Not run		Not run	
2005	(France) Arnaud Demeester	Yamaha	(France) Blaise Parent	Yamaha	Not run		Not run		Not run	
2006	(France) Timoteï Potisek	Honda	(France) Romain Couprie (France) Blaise Parent	Yamaha	Not run		Not run		Not run	
2007	(France) Arnaud Demeester	Yamaha	(France) Romain Couprie (France) Blaise Parent	Yamaha	Not run		Not run		Not run	
2008	(France) Arnaud Demeester	Yamaha	(France) Romain Couprie	Yamaha	Not run		Not run		Not run	
2009	(France) Timoteï Potisek	Honda	(France) Romain Couprie	Yamaha	Not run		Not run		Not run	
2010	(France) Mickaël Pichon	Honda	(France) Jérémie Warnia	Can Am	(France) Arnaud Aubin	Yamaha	Not run		Not run	
2011	(Belgium) Steve Ramon	Suzuki	(France) Jérémie Warnia	Can Am	(France) Dylan Ferrandis	Kawasaki	Not run		Not run	
2012	(France) Jean-Claude Moussé	Yamaha	(France) Jérémie Warnia	Can Am	(Belgium) Julien Lieber	KTM	Not run		Not run	
2013	(France) Jean-Claude Moussé	Yamaha	(France) Jérôme Bricheux	KTM	(Belgium) Daymond Martens	KTM	(France) Antoine Lemaire	Yamaha	Not run	
2014	(France) Adrien van Beveren	Yamaha	(France) Romain Couprie	Yamaha	(United Kingdom) Ben Watson	KTM	(France) Alexis Collignon	Honda	Not run	
2015	(France) Adrien van Beveren	Yamaha	(France) Jérémie Warnia	Yamaha	(France) Maxime Renaux	Yamaha	(France) Alexis Collignon	Honda	(Belgium) Johan Boonen	Husaberg
2016	(France) Adrien van Beveren	Yamaha	(France) Jérémie Warnia	Yamaha	(France) Anthony Bourdon	Husqvarna	(France) Mathéo Miot	Kawasaki	(France) Yves Deudon	Kawasaki
2017	(Belgium) Daymond Martens	Yamaha	(France) Jérémie Warnia	Yamaha	(France) Jérémy Hauquier	KTM	(France) Florian Miot	Yamaha	(Belgium) Sven Breugelmans	Honda
2018	(France) Milko Potisek	Yamaha	(France) Jérémy Forestier	Yamaha	(France) Alexis Collignon	Honda	(France) Arnaud Zoldos	KTM	(Belgium) Sven Breugelmans	Honda
2019	(United Kingdom) Nathan Watson	KTM	(France) MOatthieu Ternynck	Yamaha	(France) Mathéo Miot	KTM	(France) Adrien Petit	Husqvarna	(France) Rudy Vergriete	Honda
2020	(France) Milko Potisek	Yamaha	(Belgium) Randy Naveaux	Yamaha	(France) Florian Miot	KTM	(France) Marc Antoine Rossi	KTM	(France) Rudy Vergriete	Honda
2021	Event cancelled (Covid-19)									
2022	(France) Milko Potisek	Yamaha	(Belgium) Randy Naveaux	Yamaha	(France) Quentin Prugnières	Kawasaki	(France) Mano Faure	Husqvarna	(France) Maxime Sot	Yamaha
2023	(United Kingdom) Todd Kellett	Yamaha	(Belgium) Randy Naveaux	Yamaha	(France) Adrien Petit	Yamaha	(France) Sleny Goyer	KTM	(France) Adrien van Beveren	Honda
2024	(United Kingdom) Todd Kellett	Yamaha	(Belgium) Randy Naveaux	Yamaha	(France) Mathis Valin	Kawasaki	(France) Sleny Goyer	Gas Gas	(France) David Herbreteau	Honda
2025	(United Kingdom) Todd Kellett	Yamaha	(Belgium) Randy Naveaux	Yamaha	(Netherlands) Damien Knuiman	Gas Gas	(Netherlands) Jenairo Beerens	KTM	(France) Adrien van Beveren	Honda
2025	(United Kingdom) Todd Kellett	Yamaha	(United Kingdom) Harry Walker	Dragon Quad Racing	(France) Tom Caneele	KTM	(France) Tim Lopes	Kawasaki	(France) Florian Miot	Honda

=== Women's category ===
Year	Enduro du Touquet / Enduropale (Note: The results for the women's category, from 2010 to 2018, were provided by Justine Pouille from the press service of the Enduropale du Touquet Pas-de-Calais.)		Quaduropale		Enduro Juniors		Enduro Espoirs		Enduro Vintage	
Year	Rider	Constructor	Rider	Constructor	Rider	Constructor	Rider	Constructor	Rider	Constructor
2010	(France) Mahault Bonnart	Yamaha	(France) Justine Lesselingue	Yamaha	?	?	Not run		Not run	
2011	(Netherlands) Nicky Van Wordragen	Yamaha	(France) Camille Haesaert	W-Tec (Note: W-Tec is a company based in the Netherlands, specializing in the development and production of technical conversion units for motorcycles and motorsports.)	(France) Constance Morel	Honda	Not run		Not run	
2012	(France) Mathilde Delsaux	KTM	(France) Justine Lesselingue	?	?	?	Not run		Not run	
2013	(France) Livia Lancelot	Kawasaki	(France) Gwen Fiquet	Yamaha	(France) Justine Charroux	Yamaha	(France) Manon Bachelet	Yamaha	Not run	
2014	(France) Livia Lancelot	Kawasaki	(France) Émilie Bourgeois	Yamaha	(France) Mathilde Denis	Yamaha	(France) Elsa Galand	Suzuki	Not run	
2015	(France) Julie Peyssard	Husqvarna	(Belgium) Kelly Verbraeken	W-Tec	(France) Mathilde Denis	Yamaha	(France) Morgane Soulier	KTM	?	?
2016	(Netherlands) Daniëlle van Kempen	Yamaha	(France) Justine Lesselingue	Yamaha	(France) Manon Haudoire	Yamaha	(France) Angèle Boulay	KTM	?	?
2017	(Netherlands) Daniëlle van Kempen	Yamaha	(France) Émilie Bourgeois	Yamaha	(France) Manon Haudoire	Yamaha	(France) Angèle Boulay	KTM	?	?
2018	(France) Mégane Lombard	Yamaha	(France) Justine Lesselingue	Yamaha	(France) Manon Haudoire	Yamaha	(France) Flavie Lobbedez	Husqvarna	?	?
2019	(France) Mégane Lombard	Yamaha	(France) Émilie Bourgeois	Yamaha	(France) Manon Haudoire	Yamaha	(France) Leelou Lobbedez	Husqvarna	Anne France Dupont	Yamaha
2020	(France) Manon Haudoire	Yamaha	(France) Émilie Bourgeois	Yamaha	(France) Laurine Hugues	Husqvarna	(France) Léa Chapput	KTM	(France) Anne Charlotte Tilliette	Honda
2021	Event cancelled Covid-19									
2022	(France) Mathilde Denis (Note: She finished 168th overall in the middle of a field of 1,166 competitors.)	Yamaha	(France) Émilie Bourgeois	Yamaha	?	?	(France) Malhory Dupront	Husqvarna	?	?
2023	(Belgium) Amandine Verstappen	Yamaha	(France) Nathanaëlle Abgrall	Yamaha	(France) Leelou Lobbedez	Gas Gas	(France) Léa Lesoil	KTM	?	?
2024	(Belgium) Amandine Verstappen	Yamaha	(Belgium) Kelly Verbraeken	W-Tec	(France) April Franzoni	KTM	(France) Léa Abraham	KTM	?	?
2025	(Belgium) Amandine Verstappen	Yamaha	(France) Camille Petit	Kawasaki	(France) Sarah Leroy	Kawasaki	(France) Thelma Boudier-Damex	Kawasaki	No women participated	
2026	(France) Mathilde Martinez	Honda	(France) Camille Petit	KTM	(France) Léa Lesoil	Yamaha	(France) Thelma Boudier Damex	Yamaha	No women participated	

== See also ==
- Beach racing in France
- Bibione Sand Storm
- Enduro del Invierno
- Enduro del Verano
- Monte Gordo Sand Race
- Weston Beach Race
