= Steve Ramon =

Belgian motorcycle racer

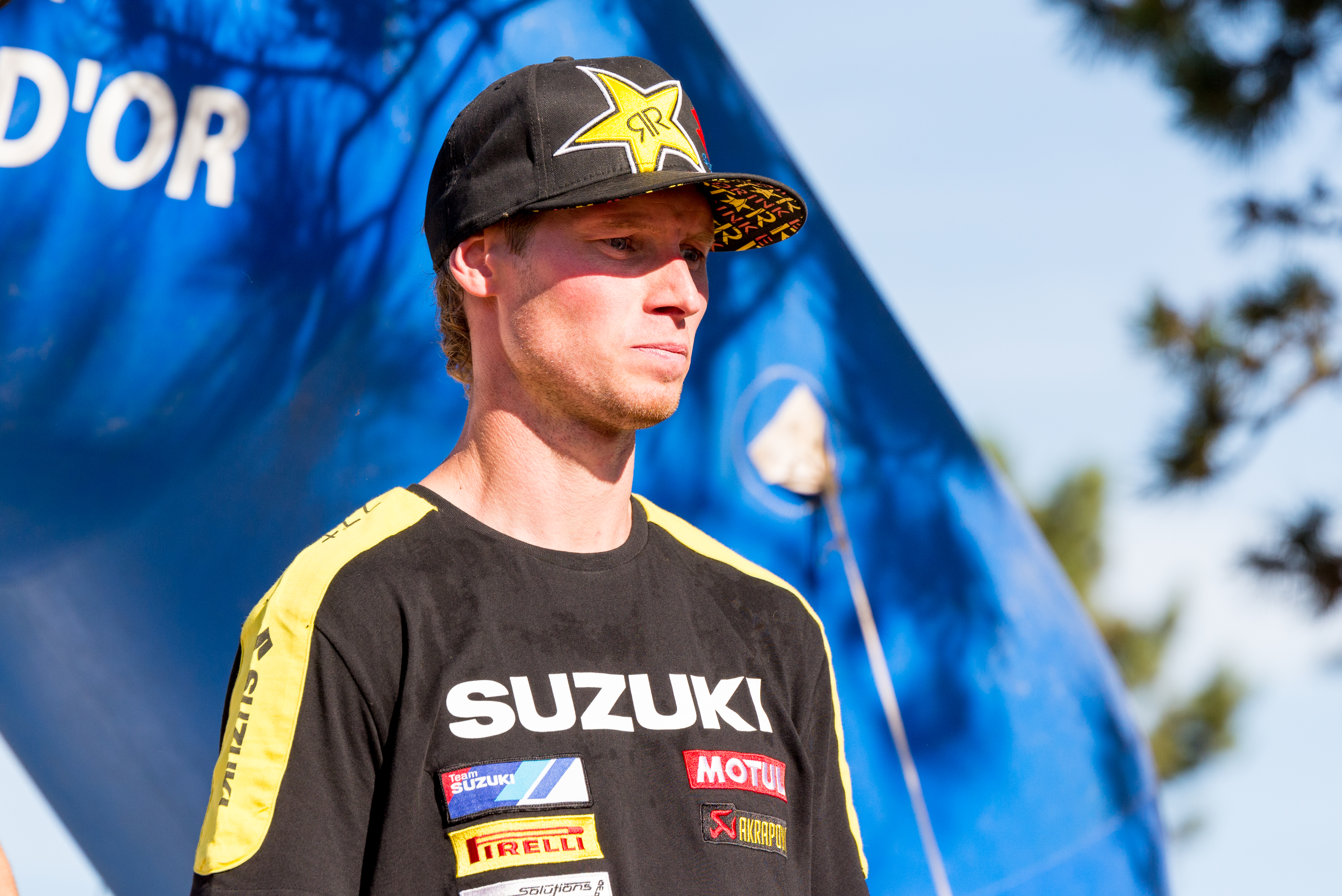
- Nationality: Belgian
- Born: 29 December 1979 (age 46) Bruges, Belgium

Motocross career
- Years active: 1996 – 2011
- Teams: Suzuki, Kawasaki, KTM
- Championships: MX2 – 2003 MX1 – 2007
- Wins: 7
- GP debut: 1996 125cc Belgian Grand Prix

Steve Ramon (born 29 December 1979 in Bruges) is a Belgian former professional motocross racer. He competed in the Motocross World Championships from 1996 to 2011. Ramon was a two-time motocross world champion.

Ramon rode a KTM to win the 2003 125cc Motocross World Championship. He also won the 2007 MX1 world championship despite not winning a single Grand Prix race. Ramon raced for the Teka Suzuki team managed by former world champion Eric Geboers and his brother Sylvain Geboers, until an injury ended his GP career in 2011. He also won the 125cc Belgian national championship in 1999 and, the MX1-GP Belgian national championship in 2004 and 2006.

In 2007, Reman won the Weston Beach Race, and in 2011, he won the Le Touquet beach race in France.

== MXGP Results ==
Year	Rnd 1	Rnd 2	Rnd 3	Rnd 4	Rnd 5	Rnd 6	Rnd 7	Rnd 8	Rnd 9	Rnd 10	Rnd 11	Rnd 12	Rnd 13	Rnd 14	Rnd 15	Rnd 16	Rnd 17	Average Finish	Podium Percent	Place
2007 MX1	2	9	8	5	2	5	2	3	2	8	6	5	5	4	3	-	-	3.93	40%	1st

Sporting positions
Preceded by Stefan Everts	World Champion – MX1; 2007	Succeeded by David Philippaerts
