= Sand racing in Mazagan =

Sand racing in Mazagan has taken place on the private beach and dunes or in the sandy forest behind the beach within the grounds of the Mazagan Beach & Golf Resort. Mazagan (officially known as El Jadida) (Note: The fortified city, built by the Portuguese at the beginning of the 16th century and named Mazagan was given up by the Portuguese in 1769 and incorporated into Morocco. The city was renamed al-Jadida in 1820, meaning 'The New'.) is a major port city on the Atlantic coast of Morocco, located 96 kilometres (60 mi) south of the city of Casablanca. Events of various disciplines such as cross country, supercross, enduro and beach racing have been held since 2013.

== Morocco Cross Country Championship ==
Organised by DADA'S Bike (Note: DADA'S Bike is a Moroccan motorcycle club that organises motorcycle events and competitions, particularly in off-Road disciplines. Founded in 2009, it affiliated with the Royal Moroccan Motorcycling Federation and approved by the Moroccan Ministry of Culture, Youth and Sports.) and the Royal Moroccan Motorcycling Federation (Fédération Royale Marocaine de Motocyclisme) (FRMM), the resort hosted the 2013 Morocco Cross Country Championship on 16-17 February. Around 60 Moroccan and international riders competed including Mickaël Pichon, twice Motocross World Champion. The motorcycle champion was Polish rider Łukasz Kurowski and the quad champion Moroccan Hicham Choufani.

== Morocco Super Cross Championship ==
DADA'S Bike and the Royal Moroccan Motorcycling Federation organised a second event in 2013 at the resort, the 2013 Morocco Super Cross Championship, on 25-26 May. Competitors included 15 international riders. Run over six heats on a track designed by former SX rider Pierre Sénac, the overall winner was Frenchman Fabien Izoird. It was the first supercross event held in Morocco.

== Championnat du Maroc Sable Cross ==
The Championnat du Maroc Sable Cross (Moroccan Sand Cross Championship) took place on the beach of the resort on 25 February 2018. It was organised by the Moroccan Sports Association of Motorcycling in Casablanca, under the aegis of the Royal Moroccan Federation of Motorcycling.

== Enduro du Mazagan ==
The first running of the enduro took place in the forest on 28-29 April 2018 on a 7 km (4.3 mi) course in the forest. Riders had to complete 10 laps of the course. The event featured a riding demonstration by Motocross World Champion Pierre Renet and was organised by the resort in partnership with MDMX. (Note: MDMX is a Moroccan motorsports event organiser based in Agadir.)

The second edition was run on 16-17 March 2019 and took place on the beach and dunes. The 6 km (3.7 mi) course featured a 3 km (1.9 mi) straight along the beach. Staged over two 35 minutes heats with a Le Mans start, it was won by French sandracer Camille Chapelière.

== Mazagan Beach Race ==
The Royal Moroccan Motorcycling Federation (FRMM) organised the Mazagan Beach Race, which it billed as a Sand Cross Grand Prix, on the beach on 16 October 2022 with the aim of promoting motorsport in the country. The race consisted of two 35 minutes heats.

The 2026 running of the race took place on 31 January - 1 February and was the fourth round of the Moroccan Motorcross Championship.

== Morocco Sand Race ==
In March 2026 the FIM announced the calendar for the 2026/2027 FIM Sand Races World Championship. The first round, Morocco Sand Race, is a new event to be held in Mazagan on 26-27 September.

The Mazagan Beach Race, which was a test for the championship race, was held on 13-14 June. Norwegian Hakon Fredriksen won the event with reigning Sand Races World Champion Todd Kellett in second.

The same 6 km (3.7 mi) course, of which 3 km (1.9 mi) was on the beach and 3km in the dunes, was used for the World Championship Morocco Sand Race. Fredriksen was again victorious in the motos race and Randy Naveaux the quad race.
