= Adrien Van Beveren =

French motorcycle racer

- Nationality: French
- Born: Adrien Pierre Guy Van Beveren; 4 January 1991 (age 35) Hazebrouck, France

Dakar Rally career
- Debut season: 2016
- Starts: 11
- Wins: 0 (7 stage wins)
- Best finish: 3rd in 2024, 2025

FIM World Rally-Raid Championship career
- Debut season: 2022
- Wins: 2
- Best finish: 2nd in 2024

Adrien Pierre Guy Van Beveren (born 4 January 1991) is a French motocross and rally raid rider. Winner of the Enduropale du Touquet in 2014, 2015 and 2016, he is the first driver to win three consecutive titles since Eric Geboers in 1990. He raced under the colors of the Japanese manufacturer Yamaha, but in 2022, he switched to Honda for competing in the Dakar Rally and the World Rally-Raid Championship. He has also won the French Sand Racing Championship (championnat de France des sables) three times.

Van Beveren's best result in the Dakar Rally is a 3rd place in the 2024 Dakar Rally and 2025 Dakar Rally. He finished runner-up in the 2021 FIM Cross-Country Rallies World Championship.

== Racing record ==
=== Racing career summary ===
| Season | Series | Team | Races | Wins | Stage wins | Podiums | Points | Position |
|---|---|---|---|---|---|---|---|---|
| 2015 | FIM Cross-Country Rallies World Championship | | 2 | 0 | 0 | 0 | 7 | N/A |
| 2016 | Dakar Rally | Yamalube Yamaha Junior Rally Team | 1 | 0 | 0 | 0 | N/A | 8th |
| 2016 | FIM Cross-Country Rallies World Championship | Yamalube Yamaha Official Rally Team | 3 | 0 | 0 | 0 | 28 | 10th |

=== Dakar Rally results ===
| Year | Category | Class | Vehicle | Position | Stage wins |
|---|---|---|---|---|---|
| 2016 | Bikes | G2 | (Japan) Yamaha | 6th | 0 |
| 2017 | Bikes | G1 | (Japan) Yamaha | 4th | 1 |
| 2018 | Bikes | G1 | (Japan) Yamaha | Ret | 1 |
| 2019 | Bikes | G1 | (Japan) Yamaha | Ret | 0 |
| 2020 | Bikes | G1 | (Japan) Yamaha | Ret | 0 |
| 2021 | Bikes | G1 | (Japan) Yamaha | Ret | 0 |
| 2022 | Bikes | RallyGP | (Japan) Yamaha | 4th | 0 |
| 2023 | Bikes | RallyGP | (Japan) Honda | 5th | 1 |
| 2024 | Bikes | RallyGP | (Japan) Honda | 3rd | 2 |
| 2025 | Bikes | RallyGP | (Japan) Honda | 3rd | 1 |
| 2026 | Bikes | RallyGP | (Japan) Honda | 6th | 1 |

=== Complete World Rally-Raid Championship results ===
| Year | Team | Vehicle | Class | 1 | 2 | 3 | 4 | 5 | Pos. | Points |
|---|---|---|---|---|---|---|---|---|---|---|
| 2022 | Monster Energy Yamaha Rally Team | Yamaha WR450F Rally | RallyGP | DAK; 4 | ABU | | | | 3rd | 58 |
| 2022 | Monster Energy Honda Team | Honda CRF450 Rally | RallyGP | | | MOR; 4 | AND; 1 | | 3rd | 58 |
| 2023 | Monster Energy Honda Team | Honda CRF450 Rally | RallyGP | DAK; 5 | ABU; 1 | SON; 5 | DES; 4 | MOR; 6 | 3rd | 76 |
| 2024 | Monster Energy Honda Team | Honda CRF450 Rally | RallyGP | DAK; 3 | ABU; Ret | PRT; 3 | DES; 3 | MOR; 2 | 2nd | 76 |
| 2025 | Monster Energy Honda HRC | Honda CRF450 Rally | RallyGP | DAK; 3 | ABU; 5 | ZAF; 4 | PRT; Ret | MOR; 4 | 5th | 61 |
| 2026 | Monster Energy Honda HRC | Honda CRF450 Rally | RallyGP | DAK; 6 | PRT | DES | MOR | ABU | | |
