= FIM Sand Races World Championship =

- FIM Sand Races World Championship logo
- Category: Motorcycle racing
- Region: International
- Inaugural season: 2025
- Official website: FIM Sand Races World Championship

The FIM Sand Races World Championship is the world championship series for beach racing, a variant of off-road motorcycle racing.

Rounds of the series are mass-start, mass-participation events taking place on beaches or in other sandy coastal areas.

The series originated as an FIM-sanctioned World Cup, held in 2023 and 2024, before being upgraded to a full FIM World Championship for 2025 onwards. Famous events such as the Enduropale du Touquet and the Enduro del Verano in Argentina have formed part of the series since its inception.

== History ==
In October 2022 the FIM in conjunction with the French, Portuguese and Argentinian Motorcycling Federations announced the launch of a new FIM Sand Races World Cup series starting in 2023.

=== 2023 ===
The inaugural season consisted of three events:

Round	Date	Location
1	3–5 February	(France) Enduropale du Touquet
2	24–26 February	(Argentina) Enduro del Verano
3	17–19 November	(Portugal) Monte Gordo Sand Experience

36 riders contested the series and the Cup was won by British rider Todd Kellett.

=== 2024 ===
The calendar was expanded to 6 events for 2024:

Round	Date	Location
1	2–4 February	(France) Enduropale du Touquet
2	23–25 February	(Argentina) Enduro del Verano
3	26–27 October	(France) Ronde des Sables de Loon Plage
4	1–3 November	(Italy) Bibione Sand Storm
5	22–24 November	(Portugal) Monte Gordo Sand Experience
6	30 November–1 December	(France) Ronde des Sables Hossegor-Capbreton

The 4th round was initially scheduled to be the Weston Beach Race on 12–13 October. This was later changed to the Ronde des Sables de Loon Plage on 26-27 October.

Kellett was able to successfully defend his title in the 2024 season by winning every round. 48 riders competed.

=== 2025 ===
Ahead of the 2025 season, the FIM announced that the series would be upgraded to full FIM World Championship status from that season onwards. A provisional calendar was released on 16 January 2025. The championship was contested over six rounds in Western Europe and Argentina.

Round	Date	Location
1	8–9 February	(France) Enduropale du Touquet
2	29–31 August	(Argentina) Enduro del Invierno
3	24–26 October	(Italy) Bibione Sand Storm
4	21–23 November	(France) Ronde des Sables Hossegor-Capbreton
5	29–30 November	(Portugal) Monte Gordo Sand Race
6	13–15 February 2026	(France) Enduropale du Touquet

Todd Kellet won the championship, winning every round but one.

=== 2026–2027 ===
The calendar for the 2026–2027 season was announced on 5 March 2026. The number of rounds was reduced to five to reduce logistical costs and encourage participation. A new race, the Morocco Sand Race to be held at Mazagan (El Jadida), opens the season.

Round	Date	Location
1	26–27 September	Morocco Sand Race
2	23–25 October	(Italy) Bibione Sand Storm
3	7–8 November	(France) Ronde des Sables–Loon Plage
4	27–29 November	(Portugal) Monte Gordo Sand Race
5	TBC	(France) Enduropale du Touquet

A Sand Races Team Trophy was introduced and the regulations were changed with all events now being of an endurance format.

== Championship ==
=== Classes ===
The FIM Sand Races World Championship includes the following categories and classes:

- Sand Races World Championship - Motorcycles
- Sand Races World Cup - Veterans
- Sand Races World Cup - Women
- Sand Races World Cup - Junior
- Sand Races World Cup - Vintage
- Sand Races World Cup - Quads
- Sand Races World Cup - Quad Veterans
- Sand Races Team Trophy - introduced in 2026

=== Format ===
Rounds of the championship must take place on circuits that are composed of least 90% sand. From the 2026–2027 season events are run on an endurance format, with either 1 or 2 races.

Single race

- Maximum 3 hours, minimum 1 ½ hours duration.

Two races

- Minimum 1 hour duration for each race, total duration of both races not to exceed 3 hours.

==== Previous format ====
Prior to the 2026–2027 season events could be run in two formats:

Endurance on Sand

- 1 race of a longer distance (maximum 3 hours, minimum 1 ½ hours).

Sand Cross

- 2–3 races of a shorter distance, with final classification being determined from these.

=== Points system ===
Position	1st	2nd	3rd	4th	5th	6th	7th	8th	9th	10th	11th	12th	13th	14th	15th+
Points	25	20	16	13	11	10	9	8	7	6	5	4	3	2	1

== List of Champions ==
Season	Motorcycle Champion	Quad Champion	Junior Champion	Women Champion	Veteran Champion
2025	(United Kingdom) Todd Kellett (Yamaha)	(France) Pablo Violet (Yamaha)	(France) Matheo Gerat (Yamaha)	(France) Mathilde Denis (Honda)	(Uruguay) Fernando Rubio (Honda)
Series run as World Cup
2024	(United Kingdom) Todd Kellett (Yamaha)	(France) Pablo Violet (Yamaha)	(France) Paolo Maschio (Kawasaki)	(Belgium) Amandine Verstappen (Yamaha)	(France) Gregory Deleu (Fantic)
2023	(United Kingdom) Todd Kellett (Yamaha)	(France) Michel Trannin (Honda)	(France) Paolo Maschio (Kawasaki)	(France) Mathilde Denis (Honda)	(France) Arnaud Besnier (Honda)
