= Beach racing in France =

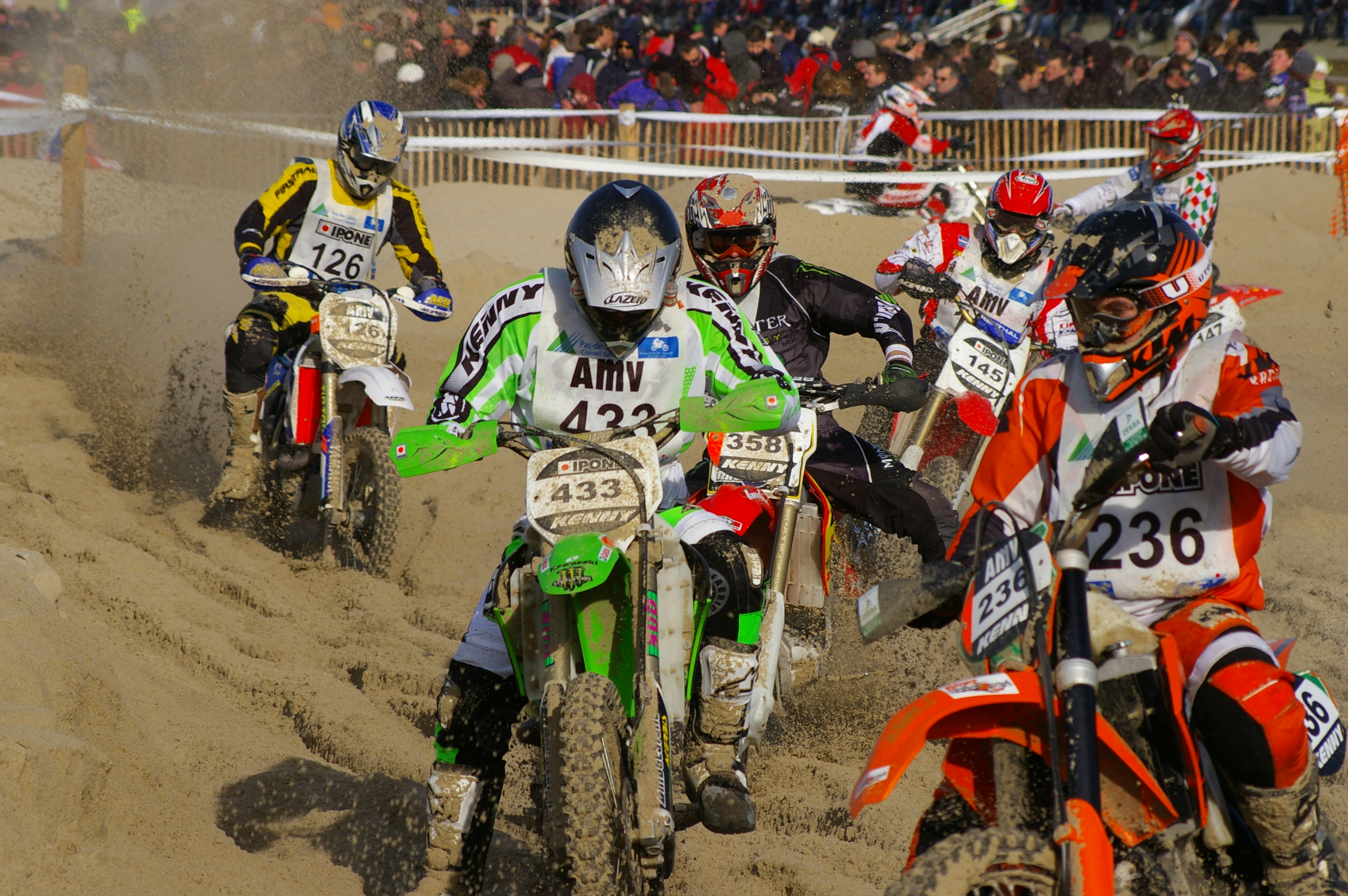
Enduropale du Touquet 2008

Beach racing in France has a long history dating back to at least 1919. Its premier event is the Enduropale du Touquet, which is the longest sand race in the world. There is a national Championnat de France des sables (CFS) [French Sandracing Championship] and rounds of the FIM Sand Races World Championship are held in France.

== Races ==
=== Beach-Cross de Berck ===
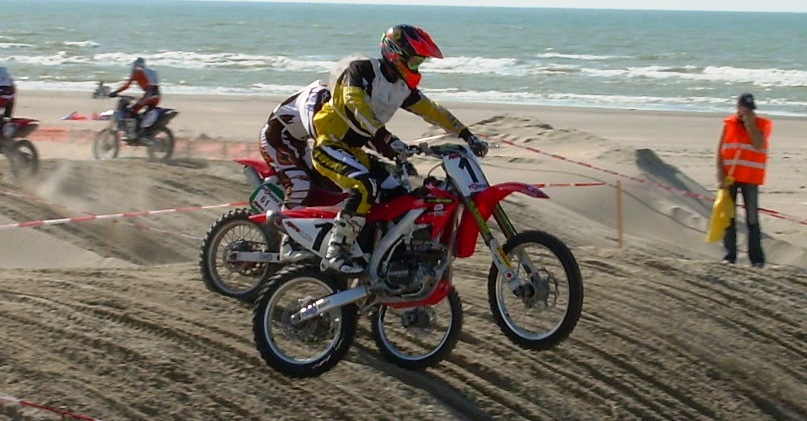
Timoteï Potisek at Beach-Cross de Berck in 2006

The Beach-Cross de Berck is a race held annually since 2004 on the beach at Berck in the Pas-de-Calais department on the Opal Coast in France. This race is part of the Championnat de France des sables (French Sand Racing Championship). Unlike the other races in the championship, which are endurance races, this is a motocross-style race.

The first Beach-Cross de Berck was organised by Frédéric Lemeunier of the Touquet Auto Moto (TAM) with the support of the Berck-sur-mer town hall. In 2024, the Beach Cross de Berck Organisation (BCBO) under the guidance of Jean-Claude Moussé, four-time winner of the Enduropale du Touquet, and Denis Guérin, former journalist at France 3, took over organisation of the event.

The circuit, which takes 5 days to build, was redesigned in 2024 to bring the big jumps along the sea wall allowing better viewing for spectators.

=== Bud Sand Race of Magescq/Sand Bike Festival ===
The Bud Racing Training Camp in Magescq, Landes held a round of the French Sandracing Championship (CFS) in 2021, 2022 and 2023. Not included in the CFS calendar for 2024, Bud Racing organised their own Sand Bike Festival, which was again held in 2025. The 48 ha (120 acres) facility has 8 tracks, some sand, some dirt, to suit riders of all abilities and experience and is the biggest motocross facility in France.

=== Endurance des Lagunes de Saint-Léger de Balson ===
The Endurance des Lagunes de Saint-Léger de Balson is an annual inland sand race that takes place in the Landes forest at Saint-Léger-de-Balson, Nouvelle-Aquitaine, France. The race takes place on the black sand 4 km (2.5 mi) course of the Moto-Club Langonnais.

=== Enduro des Baïnes ===
The Enduro des Baïnes was a race that took place on the beach and dunes of Hourtin in the Gironde department. It was first run in 1984, and took its name from the baïnes the course ran through. It was subject to a judicial review in 1991.

=== Enduropale du Touquet ===
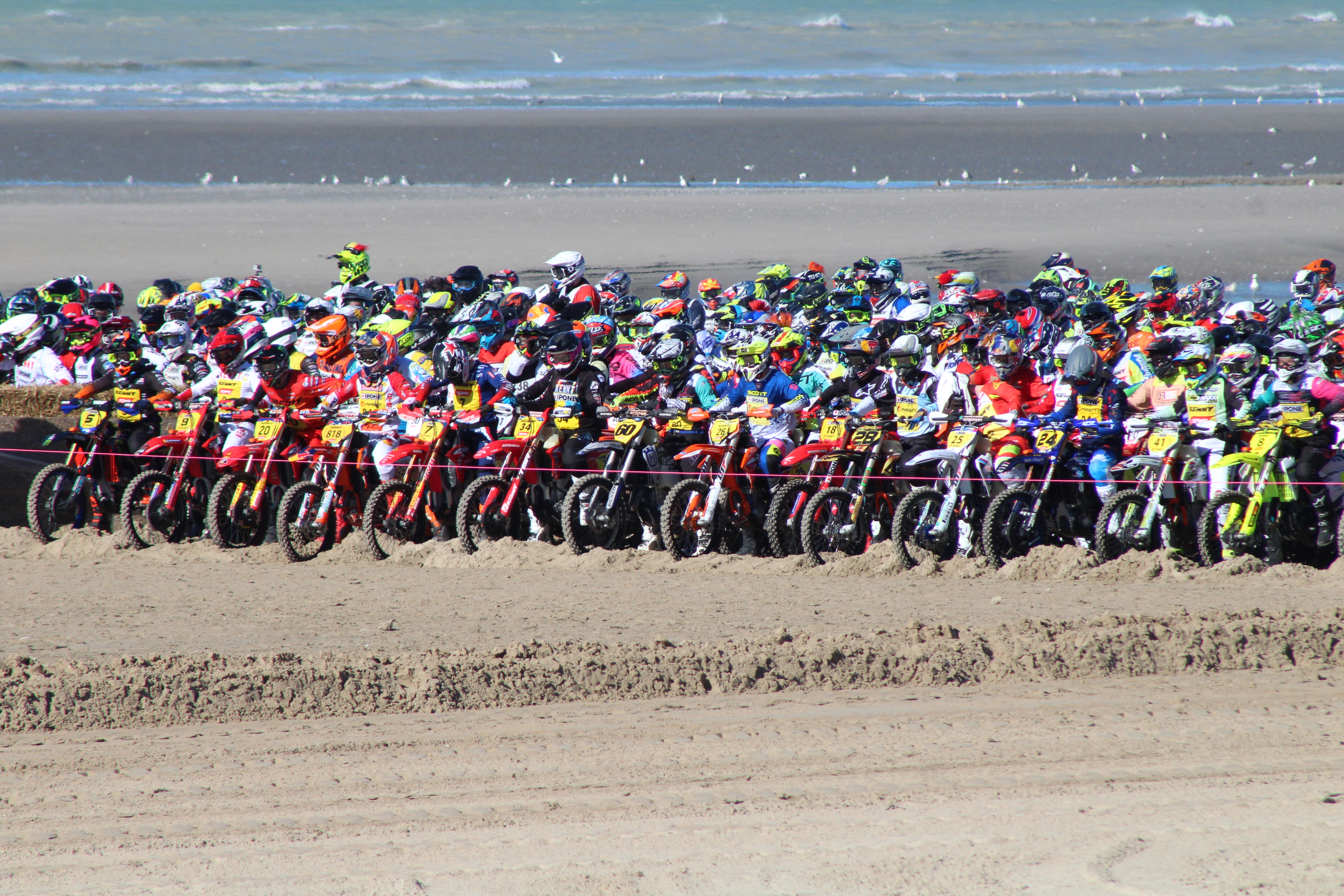
Start of the 2022 Enduropale

The Enduropale du Touquet is Europe's biggest enduro race and the longest beach race in the world. First run in 1975 in was the brainchild of Thierry Sabine, who later created the Dakar Rally. Initially it was run on the beach and dunes of Le Touquet, Pas-de-Calais. Following environmental protests in 1981, it has been run on the beach between Le Touquet and Stella Plage on a 15 km (9.3 mi) course. The race is a regular fixture in both the French Sandracing Championship (CFS) and the FIM Sand Races World CUP/Championship.

=== GURP TT de Grayan-et-l'Hôpital ===
The Gurp TT à Grayan-et-l’Hôpital is an annual beach race held at Grayan-et-l'Hôpital, Gironde, France. First run in 2001, riders race along the beach for 4 km (2.5 mi) before turning onto a track through pine trees. The race is organised by the Moto-Club des Esteys.

=== Normandy Beach Race ===
The Normandy Beach Race was held annually on the Sword Beach of Ouistreham, Normandy from 2019 to 2023, it was then held every other year. Pre-1947 cars and motorcycles take part in 1/8 mile (200 m) drag races on the beach. The event tries to capture the atmosphere of 1940s/50s beach racing in the US and many of the participants and spectators wear period dress. The event is the brainchild of Thomas Hervé, Jean-Marc Lazzari and Marc Félix who had all previously competed the American The Race of Gentlemen (TROG) in New Jersey. Unfortunately Félix was killed in a freak accident at the 2025 event.

=== Ronde des Sables de Loon Plage ===
The Ronde des sables de Loon-Plage, originally named Ronde des Sables du Littoral, is an annual beach race that has been run at Loon-Plage in the Nord department since 1999. Since 2002 it has been run at the Circuit Bernard Gouvart and has been a round of the French sand racing championship (CFS) since 2004.

=== Ronde des Sables Hossegor-Capbreton ===
The Ronde des sables d'Hossegor-Capbreton is an annual race that takes place on the beach between Soorts-Hossegor and Capbreton, Landes. It is the second oldest sand race in France. First run in 1979 the course originally used the beach and the forest behind. It is now run on the beach only on a temporary course. It is organised by the Moto-club des Plages and is a round of the CFS.

=== Rond'Europe à Fort-Mahon ===
The Rond'Europe à Fort-Mahon was a beach race that took place at Fort-Mahon-Plage in the Somme Department from 1988 to 2008. The 2009 running was cancelled following environmental pressure and the event was never run after that.

== Historic ==
=== Grand Prix de La Baule ===
Various events were organised for American personnel stationed in France for Memorial Day in May 1919. (Note: Although the armistice to end the fighting of WW1 had been signed, the peace treaty had yet to be signed so many American troops remained in France.) At La Baule, Pays de la Loire, a races on the beach were organised.

In 1921 the Automobile Club de l'Ouest revived the event and ran it over several days. The Semaine de l'Automobile (Automobile Week) was organised which included the first Grand Prix de La Baule. The Grand Prix beach circuit had two 1,500 m (4,900 ft) parallel straits connected by two hairpins and the race was of 50 laps. The race was then run annually until 1929 and then again from 1931 to 1933. It was revived for 1938 and planned for 1939 but cancelled following the breakout of WW2.

== See also ==
- Beach racing in the UK
- Sand racing in Mazagan
