= Beach racing =

Motorsport racing on a beach

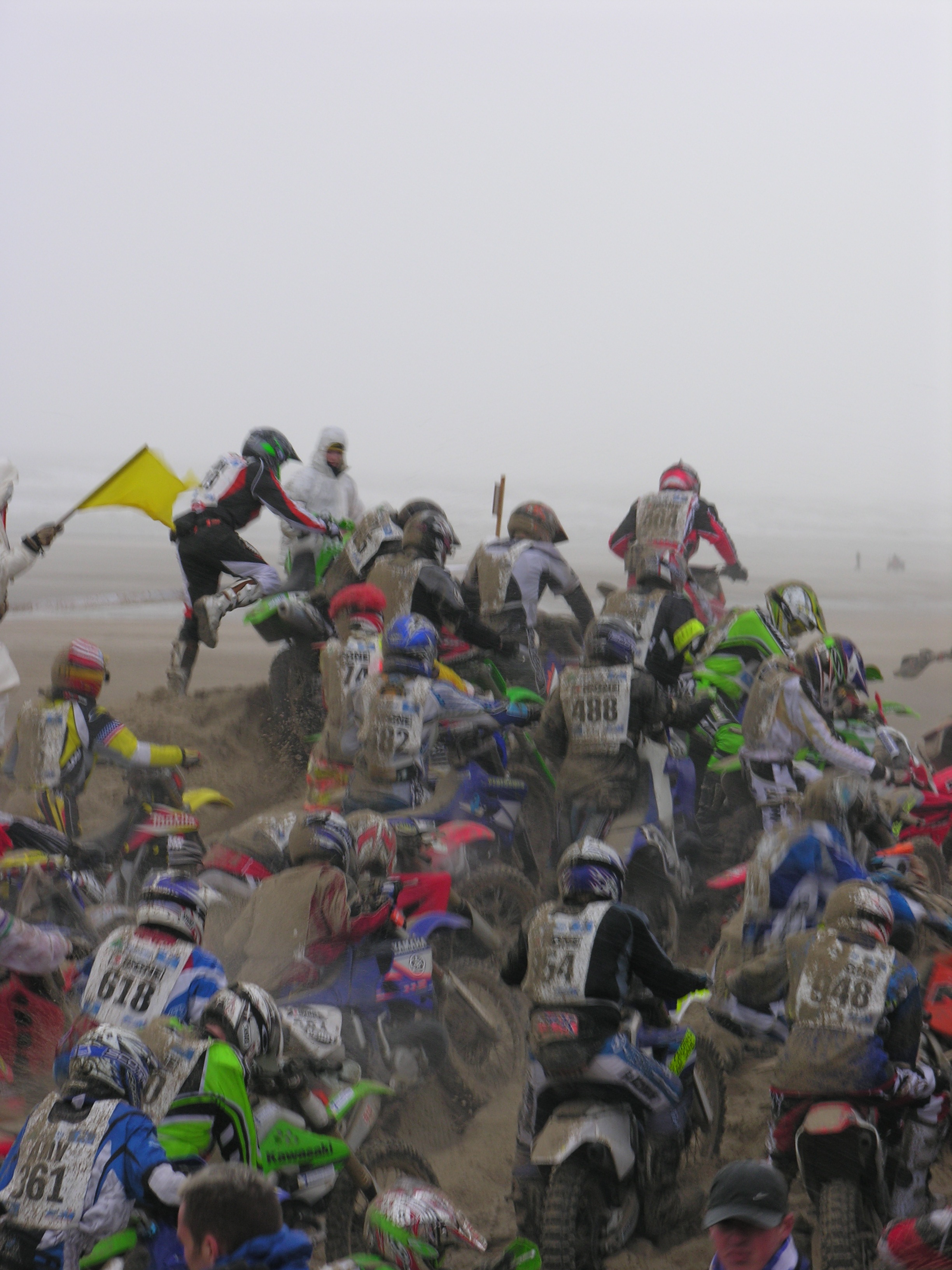
Beach racing (Enduropale 2007)

Beach racing is a motorcycle sport offshoot of enduro and motocross racing. Riders on solo motorcycles, quad bikes, or sidecar combinations compete on a course marked out on a beach, often with man made jumps and sand dunes being constructed to make the course tougher.

Beach races are usually held annually, generally at seaside resorts with large beaches. Typically, beach races follow the format of hare scrambles, with riders competing on a circuit of 1–3 miles (1.5–5 km) in length, usually for a time period of 1–3 hours.

Due to their unique nature, beach races tend to be very popular with riders and spectators, with some of the larger races attracting several hundred riders. However beach racing is known to be very tough on motorcycles, small sand particles can damage wheel bearings, chains and sprockets, and the soft, sandy surface increases the demand on engines and clutches. Beach races are generally held in early spring or late autumn. This is because seasonal tourist trade at seaside resorts is low during these periods, there is more space for riders and competitors to park, and local authorities are more willing to allow their beaches to be closed off and used as a motorcycle course, due to the extra trade brought by riders, families and spectators.

== Popular beach races ==
Sellicks Beach, South Australia has organised motorcycle racing on the beach and was held as early as 1917 with annual speed trials being held during summer until 1953 and with re-enactments in both 1986 and 1992. Annual racing resumed in 2017 after a 20 year period of no activity.

The Enduropale (formerly named the Enduro du Touquet) has been held every spring since 1975 at the seaside town of Le Touquet with some 1,000 motorbikes, Quad bikes and 250,000 spectators. The event attracts riders and spectators from across Europe.

From 1981 to 1991 the Veronica Beach Race was held in Scheveningen, The Netherlands. The event which features quad, sidecar and motorbikes races was broadcast in more than 15 countries. Since 2006 the Red Bull Knock Out beach race will take place in Scheveningen, only for motorbikes. New Red Bull Knock Out editions are scheduled in 2018, 2020 and 2022.

Beach races are popular in the United Kingdom, and one of the most famous beach races is the Weston Beach Race, (previously known as the Weston Enduro) held on Weston-super-Mare beach in Somerset. The event which features quad, sidecar, solo and junior races, has been held since 1983, and regularly attracts entries of over 1,000 riders, with crowds of up to 100,000 watching the event over the weekend. In addition to Weston Beach Race the Amateur Motor Cycle Association run the Skegness Beach Race, this event attracts 25,000 spectators over the weekend.

Beach races are held each year from October to March in Mablethorpe, Lincolnshire on the east coast of England. Mablethorpe Sand Racing, organised by the Mablethorpe Sandracing Club, cover a number of different solo and quad classes. A beach race is also held in Weymouth, with proceeds from the event being donated to a local charity.

In recent years, a popular beach race has been held at Barmouth, Wales, however this event differs as it is run along the lines of a motocross event, on a shorter, motocross style circuit. Beach Cross Racing is also taking place twice a year, usually in March and October, at Margate in Kent, and known as Margate Beach Cross. The event which is organized by QRAUK, in conjunction with Island Events and Thanet District Council has proven to be popular with not only British riders but with a huge number of riders from the Continent. The event has both Quads and Solos racing around a specially prepared course on Margate's main sands and it attracts many thousands of visitors.
