= British Motocross Championship =

Premier Motocross series in the United Kingdom

ACU British Motocross Championship
- Category: Motocross
- Country: United Kingdom
- Inaugural season: 1951

The ACU British Motocross Championship (abbreviated to MXGB and currently known for sponsorship reasons as the Motul ACU British Motocross Championship) is the premier motocross series in the United Kingdom.

The championship is recognised as being the official British championship in the sport of motocross by the ACU. After being run by a promoter for several seasons, the championship will be run in house by the ACU from 2025.

== History ==
There is uncertainty about the origins of motocross, but it is likely that it began in 1914 when the Scott Trial was started by Alfred Angas Scott, owner and founder of The Scott Motorcycle Company. The Scott Trial was held on the Yorkshire moors in Northern England and after World War I test riders of new British motorcycles started racing against each other on off-road factory courses. The French came up with the term 'moto cross' to describe this off-road racing and the first recorded motocross competition was on Camberley Heath in Surrey, England on 29 March 1924.

== Classes ==
The British Motocross Championship competition is organised into classes of MX1 and MX2. MX1 is for 251cc to 450cc (fourstroke) and MX2 for 175cc to 250cc 4-stroke motorcycles or 120cc to 250cc 2-stroke motorcycles.

In addition to the senior classes, several youth classes take place across each round in support of the series, forming the British Youth Motocross Championship. These include the 250cc, 125cc, Big-Wheel 85cc, Small-Wheel 85cc and 65cc classes.

The British Women's Motocross Championship, with a supporting youth class, was also revived upon the beginning of the stewardship of former promoter RHL Activities. However, this was discontinued before the start of the 2022 season due to lack of entries. The Women's Championship is scheduled to return in the 2025 season, as part of the ACU returning to running the series in house.

A 'Veterans' series was introduced in 2009 with just two rounds. This class was later discontinued and does not form part of the British Motocross Championship.

== Auto-Cycle Union ==
The Auto-Cycle Union (ACU) is the governing body of the British Motocross Championship. The ACU sets the rules for the British Motocross Championship and organises the training of stewards and marshals to ensure track safety. The ACU also sets and checks safety standards and tracks the progress of national championships. The ACU has an important role to defend and develop motorcycle sport and is independent of any commercial organisation.

== Sponsorship ==
The British Motocross Championship currently has a title sponsor with Motul, a partnership that commenced in 2025.

== Champions ==
Season	MX1 Champion	MX2 Champion
2026	(United Kingdom) Conrad Mewse	(United Kingdom) Charlie Heyman
2025	(United Kingdom) Conrad Mewse	(United Kingdom) Tommy Searle
2024	(Netherlands) Jeffrey Herlings	(Netherlands) Cas Valk
2023	(United Kingdom) Conrad Mewse	(Sweden) Isak Gifting
2022	(United Kingdom) Tommy Searle	(United Kingdom) Conrad Mewse
2021	(United Kingdom) Tommy Searle	(United Kingdom) Conrad Mewse
2020	Cancelled due to COVID-19 pandemic	
2019	(United Kingdom) Tommy Searle	(New Zealand) Dylan Walsh
2018	(Russia) Evgeny Bobryshev	(United Kingdom) Conrad Mewse
2017	(United Kingdom) Graeme Irwin	(United Kingdom) Ben Watson
2016	(United Kingdom) Tommy Searle	(United Kingdom) Adam Sterry
2015	(United Kingdom) Shaun Simpson	(France) Steven Lenoir
2014	(United Kingdom) Shaun Simpson	(Latvia) Matiss Karro
2013	(United Kingdom) Kristian Whatley	(United Kingdom) Elliott Banks-Browne
2012	(Belgium) Kevin Strijbos	(United Kingdom) Elliott Banks-Browne
2011	(United Kingdom) Brad Anderson	(Switzerland) Arnaud Tonus
2010	(Russia) Evgeny Bobryshev	(United States) Zach Osborne
2009	(United Kingdom) Brad Anderson	(United Kingdom) Stephen Sword
2008	(United Kingdom) Billy MacKenzie	(United Kingdom) Shaun Simpson
2007	(United Kingdom) Billy MacKenzie	(United States) Mike Brown
2006	(Belgium) Ken De Dycker	(United Kingdom) Carl Nunn
2005	(New Zealand) Josh Coppins	(United Kingdom) Carl Nunn
2004	(New Zealand) Josh Coppins	(United Kingdom) Stephen Sword
	Open Champion	125cc Champion
2003	(United Kingdom) Gordon Crockard	(United Kingdom) Stephen Sword
2002	(United Kingdom) Paul Cooper	(United Kingdom) Stephen Sword
2001	(United Kingdom) Gordon Crockard	(Denmark) Brian Jorgensen
2000	(United Kingdom) Gordon Crockard	(United States) Mike Brown
1999	(United Kingdom) Paul Malin	(United Kingdom) James Dobb
1998	(Sweden) Joakim Karlsson	(United Kingdom) James Dobb

== See also ==
- Scott Trial
- World Enduro Championship
