= 2024 British Motocross Championship =

British Motocross Competition in 2024

The 2024 ACU British Motocross Championship season (known for sponsorship reasons as the Dirt Store ACU British Motocross Championship) was the 72nd British Motocross Championship season.

Conrad Mewse started the season as the reigning champion in the MX1 class after he picked up his fourth title in 2023. After initially riding the opening round of the season as a wildcard, 5-time FIM Motocross World Champion Jeffrey Herlings raced the full season and took the title.

In the MX2 class, Swedish rider Isak Gifting was the reigning champion. However he did not defend his title as he focussed on the MXGP class of the 2024 FIM Motocross World Championship and the 2024 Italian Prestige Motocross Championship. As in the MX1 class, it was a Dutch rider Cas Valk, who became champion in MX2 in what was his first season riding in the UK.

The second race at the third round at Blaxhall was cancelled due to two race incidents and a separate incident with a member of the crowd leaving the event without enough medical cover.

The fourth round, scheduled to be held at Foxhill, was cancelled in the week leading up to the event due to low entries.

It was later announced that the fifth round at Hawkstone Park would be the first event where the ACU British Motocross Championship ran in conjunction with the rival Fastest 40 series (formerly known as the MX Nationals).

== Race calendar and results ==
The full calendar was released on 29 October 2023.

=== MX1 ===
| Round | Date | Location | Race 1 Winner | Race 2 Winner | Round Winner |
|---|---|---|---|---|---|
| 1 | 28 April | Lyng | (United Kingdom) Conrad Mewse | (Netherlands) Jeffrey Herlings | (Netherlands) Jeffrey Herlings |
| 2 | 26 May | Canada Heights | (Netherlands) Jeffrey Herlings | (Netherlands) Jeffrey Herlings | (Netherlands) Jeffrey Herlings |
| 3 | 23 June | Blaxhall | (United Kingdom) Conrad Mewse | Race Cancelled | (United Kingdom) Conrad Mewse |
| - | 14 July | Foxhill | Round Cancelled | | |
| 4 | 3 August | Hawkstone Park | (Netherlands) Jeffrey Herlings | (Netherlands) Jeffrey Herlings | (Netherlands) Jeffrey Herlings |
| 5 | 31 August | Schoolhouse | (Netherlands) Jeffrey Herlings | (Netherlands) Jeffrey Herlings | (Netherlands) Jeffrey Herlings |
| 6 | 21 September | Preston Docks | (United Kingdom) Conrad Mewse | (Netherlands) Jeffrey Herlings | (Netherlands) Jeffrey Herlings |

=== MX2 ===
| Round | Date | Location | Race 1 Winner | Race 2 Winner | Round Winner |
|---|---|---|---|---|---|
| 1 | 28 April | Lyng | (United States) Jack Chambers | (Netherlands) Cas Valk | (Netherlands) Cas Valk |
| 2 | 26 May | Canada Heights | (United Kingdom) Joel Rizzi | (United States) Jack Chambers | (United States) Jack Chambers |
| 3 | 23 June | Blaxhall | (Netherlands) Cas Valk | Race Cancelled | (Netherlands) Cas Valk |
| - | 14 July | Foxhill | Round Cancelled | | |
| 4 | 3 August | Hawkstone Park | (United Kingdom) Joel Rizzi | (United Kingdom) Tommy Searle | (United Kingdom) Tommy Searle |
| 5 | 31 August | Schoolhouse | (United Kingdom) Tommy Searle | (United Kingdom) Tommy Searle | (United Kingdom) Tommy Searle |
| 6 | 21 September | Preston Docks | (Netherlands) Cas Valk | (Netherlands) Cas Valk | (Netherlands) Cas Valk |

=== Circuit locations ===
2024 British Motocross Championship locations

== MX1 ==
=== Participants ===
| Team | Constructor | No | Rider | Rounds |
|---|---|---|---|---|
| Phoenix Evenstrokes Kawasaki | Kawasaki | 6 | (United Kingdom) Carlton Husband | All |
| Kescommercials.co.uk/Kawasaki Cornwall | Kawasaki | 7 | (United Kingdom) Louie Kessell | All |
| Moto-Cycle Racing | Gas Gas | 10 | (United Kingdom) Jason Meara | All |
| Apico Honda | Honda | 16 | (United Kingdom) Tom Grimshaw | All |
| Apico Honda | Honda | 50 | (United Kingdom) Martin Barr | All |
| SRM Racing | KTM | 19 | (Republic of Ireland) Aidan McDonough | 4 |
| AJP Racing Team | Husqvarna | 21 | (Zimbabwe) Jayden Ashwell | 4 |
| Crendon Tru7 Honda Racing | Honda | 23 | (United Kingdom) Taylor Hammal | 5–6 |
| Crendon Tru7 Honda Racing | Honda | 49 | (United Kingdom) Callum Green | 1–2, 5 |
| Crendon Tru7 Honda Racing | Honda | 426 | (United Kingdom) Conrad Mewse | All |
| Mills Racing | Yamaha | 27 | (United Kingdom) Christopher Mills | 4–6 |
| Monk Plant Hire | Honda | 32 | (United Kingdom) Calum Mitchell | 3 |
| Dyce Carriers/Site Sealants | KTM | 33 | (United Kingdom) Ben Edwards | All |
| SC Sporthomes Husqvarna | Husqvarna | 41 | (South Africa) Tristan Purdon | All |
| SC Sporthomes Husqvarna | Husqvarna | 91 | (United Kingdom) Charlie Putnam | All |
| AMC Transport/Design Scaffolding | Husqvarna | 48 | (United Kingdom) Harry Bradley | 1–5 |
| Danger UK/RSS/Stafford Vans | Kawasaki | 57 | (United Kingdom) Tony Craig | 1 |
| Feehily MX | KTM | 67 | (United Kingdom) Scott Alldridge | 4, 6 |
| GMR Magic Mushroom Yamaha | Yamaha | 74 | (United Kingdom) Tom Murphy | All |
| Red Bull KTM Factory Racing | KTM | 84 | (Netherlands) Jeffrey Herlings | All |
| Chambers Racing | Husqvarna | 95 | (United Kingdom) Dan Thornhill | All |
| Dirtwheelz/Moto Pro Suspension | Yamaha | 118 | (United Kingdom) Jaydon Murphy | 1 |
| S Briggs Commercials | Honda | 133 | (United Kingdom) Ashley Greedy | 2, 4 |
| Gabriel Insulation/Liphook Logistics | KTM | 134 | (United Kingdom) Liam Knight | 4 |
| GOMX 365 | Yamaha | 141 | (United Kingdom) Nathan Green | 4–5 |
| Dave Mewes Construction | Kawasaki | 149 | (United Kingdom) Luke Parker | 3 |
| Seca Racing Team | Honda | 162 | (Republic of Ireland) Stuart Edmonds | 2–4 |
| John Banks Honda | Honda | 166 | (United Kingdom) Lewis Tombs | 1 |
| Dirt Store Kawasaki | Kawasaki | 184 | (United Kingdom) James Carpenter | 1–3 |
| Modu Kawasaki Racing Team | Kawasaki | 211 | (United Kingdom) Billy MacKenzie | 2–3 |
| | Gas Gas | 222 | (United Kingdom) Jake Winnard | 6 |
| FUS Marsh Honda | Honda | 260 | (United Kingdom) Dylan Woodcock | 2 |
| | KTM | 295 | (United Kingdom) Ross Rutherford | 5–6 |
| GH Motorcycles G&B Finch Yamaha | Yamaha | 301 | (United Kingdom) Shaun Southgate | 1, 3 |
| Gabriel SS24 KTM | KTM | 326 | (United Kingdom) Josh Gilbert | 1–2, 4–6 |
| John Banks Racing Honda | Honda | 365 | (United Kingdom) Sam Nunn | All |
| Lings KTM | KTM | 411 | (United Kingdom) Declan Whittle | 1, 3 |
| Canopy Pro | Kawasaki | 414 | (United Kingdom) Glen Phillips | 2 |
| RJ Francis Motorcycles | KTM | 477 | (United Kingdom) Connor Bunkle | 3 |
| GH Motorcycles/GB Finch | Husqvarna | 499 | (United Kingdom) Ben Cole | 3 |
| Bike It Kawasaki Racing Team | Kawasaki | 579 | (United Kingdom) Bobby Bruce | 4–6 |
| ASA United Gas Gas | Gas Gas | 711 | (United Kingdom) James Cottrell | 1–3, 6 |
| DK Offroad/Bikesport Newcastle | Honda | 714 | (United Kingdom) Brad Todd | All |
| | KTM | 911 | (United Kingdom) Ben Heyward | 2 |

=== Riders Championship ===
| Pos | Rider | Bike | LYN (England) | | CAN (England) | | BLA (England) | | HAW (England) | | SCH (England) | | PRE (England) | | Points |
|---|---|---|---|---|---|---|---|---|---|---|---|---|---|---|---|
| 1 | (Netherlands) Jeffrey Herlings | KTM | 2 | 1 | 1 | 1 | 2 | C | 1 | 1 | 1 | 1 | 2 | 1 | 266 |
| 2 | (United Kingdom) Conrad Mewse | Honda | 1 | 2 | 2 | 2 | 1 | C | 2 | 2 | 2 | 2 | 1 | 2 | 251 |
| 3 | (United Kingdom) Josh Gilbert | KTM | 4 | 3 | 8 | 3 | | | 4 | 4 | 4 | 3 | 3 | 3 | 185 |
| 4 | (South Africa) Tristan Purdon | Husqvarna | 15 | 7 | 3 | 5 | 3 | C | 3 | 12 | 5 | 7 | 4 | 4 | 171 |
| 5 | (United Kingdom) Brad Todd | Honda | 5 | 4 | 5 | 11 | 4 | C | 6 | 5 | 7 | 5 | 6 | 7 | 168 |
| 6 | (United Kingdom) Jason Meara | Gas Gas | 3 | 6 | 10 | 7 | 8 | C | 10 | 6 | 6 | 6 | 10 | 10 | 151 |
| 7 | (United Kingdom) Martin Barr | Honda | 7 | 5 | 4 | 6 | 5 | C | 9 | 10 | 10 | 11 | 8 | 9 | 148 |
| 8 | (United Kingdom) Tom Grimshaw | Honda | 9 | 15 | Ret | 9 | 6 | C | 7 | 8 | 9 | 8 | 9 | 8 | 122 |
| 9 | (United Kingdom) Sam Nunn | Honda | 6 | 8 | 6 | 8 | 13 | C | 14 | 17 | 15 | 10 | 15 | 14 | 105 |
| 10 | (United Kingdom) Dan Thornhill | Husqvarna | 11 | 11 | 11 | 13 | 9 | C | 11 | 9 | 14 | 12 | 14 | 12 | 104 |
| 11 | (United Kingdom) Bobby Bruce | Kawasaki | | | | | | | 5 | 3 | 8 | 9 | 5 | 5 | 93 |
| 12 | (United Kingdom) Carlton Husband | Kawasaki | 8 | 9 | Ret | Ret | 7 | C | 8 | 7 | 11 | 14 | 11 | Ret | 93 |
| 13 | (United Kingdom) Ben Edwards | KTM | 10 | 16 | 16 | 15 | 11 | C | 15 | 11 | 13 | 13 | 13 | 13 | 85 |
| 14 | (United Kingdom) Taylor Hammal | Honda | | | | | | | | | 3 | 4 | 7 | 6 | 67 |
| 15 | (United Kingdom) Charlie Putnam | Husqvarna | 18 | 10 | 13 | 14 | 16 | C | 16 | 13 | 16 | 22 | 19 | 19 | 54 |
| 16 | (United Kingdom) Christopher Mills | Yamaha | | | | | | | 12 | 14 | 12 | 21 | 12 | 11 | 44 |
| 17 | (United Kingdom) Louie Kessell | Kawasaki | 16 | 13 | 15 | 17 | 19 | C | 23 | 19 | 19 | 17 | 18 | 15 | 42 |
| 18 | (United Kingdom) Tom Murphy | Yamaha | Ret | 17 | 18 | 16 | 17 | C | 18 | 16 | 18 | 16 | 16 | 16 | 42 |
| 19 | (United Kingdom) James Carpenter | Kawasaki | Ret | 20 | 7 | 4 | Ret | C | | | | | | | 33 |
| 20 | (Republic of Ireland) Stuart Edmonds | Honda | | | 14 | Ret | 15 | C | 13 | 15 | | | | | 27 |
| 21 | (United Kingdom) Dylan Woodcock | Honda | | | 9 | 12 | | | | | | | | | 21 |
| 22 | (United Kingdom) Billy MacKenzie | Kawasaki | | | 12 | 10 | 22 | C | | | | | | | 20 |
| 23 | (United Kingdom) Harry Bradley | Husqvarna | 19 | 14 | 19 | 20 | 20 | C | 22 | 20 | 20 | 19 | | | 17 |
| 24 | (United Kingdom) James Cottrell | KTM | 14 | 12 | 20 | Ret | Ret | C | | | | | Ret | DNS | 17 |
| 25 | (United Kingdom) Declan Whittle | KTM | 17 | Ret | | | 12 | C | | | | | | | 13 |
| 26 | (United Kingdom) Shaun Southgate | Yamaha | 20 | Ret | | | 10 | C | | | | | | | 12 |
| 27 | (United Kingdom) Lewis Tombs | Honda | 12 | 19 | | | | | | | | | | | 11 |
| 28 | (United Kingdom) Ross Rutherford | KTM | | | | | | | | | 17 | 15 | 20 | 20 | 11 |
| 29 | (United Kingdom) Ashley Greedy | Honda | | | 17 | 18 | | | 20 | 22 | | | | | 8 |
| 30 | (United Kingdom) Tony Craig | Kawasaki | 13 | Ret | | | | | | | | | | | 8 |
| 31 | (United Kingdom) Calum Mitchell | Honda | | | | | 14 | C | | | | | | | 7 |
| 32 | (United Kingdom) Scott Alldridge | KTM | | | | | | | 21 | 21 | | | 17 | 18 | 7 |
| 33 | (United Kingdom) Liam Knight | KTM | | | | | | | 19 | 18 | | | | | 5 |
| 34 | (United Kingdom) Jake Winnard | Gas Gas | | | | | | | | | | | 21 | 17 | 4 |
| 35 | (United Kingdom) Callum Green | Honda | Ret | 18 | Ret | DNS | | | | | 21 | 20 | | | 4 |
| 36 | (Zimbabwe) Jayden Ashwell | Husqvarna | | | | | | | 17 | Ret | | | | | 4 |
| 37 | (United Kingdom) Nathan Green | Yamaha | | | | | | | 24 | Ret | 22 | 18 | | | 3 |
| 38 | (United Kingdom) Luke Parker | Kawasaki | | | | | 18 | C | | | | | | | 3 |
| 39 | (United Kingdom) Glen Phillips | Kawasaki | | | 21 | 19 | | | | | | | | | 2 |
| | (United Kingdom) Ben Cole | Husqvarna | | | | | 21 | C | | | | | | | 0 |
| | (United Kingdom) Ben Heyward | KTM | | | 22 | Ret | | | | | | | | | 0 |
| | (United Kingdom) Connor Bunkle | KTM | | | | | 23 | C | | | | | | | 0 |
| | (Republic of Ireland) Aidan McDonough | KTM | | | | | | | 25 | Ret | | | | | 0 |
| | (United Kingdom) Jaydon Murphy | Yamaha | Ret | DNS | | | | | | | | | | | 0 |
| Pos | Rider | Bike | LYN (England) | | CAN (England) | | BLA (England) | | HAW (England) | | SCH (England) | | PRE (England) | | Points |

== MX2 ==
=== Participants ===
| Team | Constructor | No | Rider | Rounds |
|---|---|---|---|---|
| Crendon Tru7 Honda Racing | Honda | 3 | (Brazil) Bernardo Tibúrcio | 6 |
| Crendon Tru7 Honda Racing | Honda | 23 | (United Kingdom) Taylor Hammal | 1–4 |
| Crendon Tru7 Honda Racing | Honda | 45 | (United Kingdom) Jake Nicholls | All |
| HJA Racing | KTM | 4 | (United Kingdom) George Hopkins | 1–2, 4 |
| HJA Racing | Gas Gas | 202 | (United Kingdom) Tyler Westcott | 1–4 |
| GMR Magic Mushroom/Apico/Leatt | KTM | 5 | (United Kingdom) Liam Bennett | All |
| CM Groundworks | Gas Gas | 8 | (United Kingdom) Callum McCaul | 3 |
| Chambers Racing | KTM | 10 | (United Kingdom) Harvey Cashmore | All |
| Chambers Racing | KTM | 131 | (United Kingdom) Henry Siddiqui | 1 |
| Chambers Racing | KTM | 300 | (United Kingdom) Ben Franklin | 1–4 |
| Chambers Racing | KTM | 337 | (United Kingdom) Glenn McCormick | 2–6 |
| Chambers Racing | KTM | 731 | (United Kingdom) Alfie Jones | All |
| Bike It Kawasaki MX2 Racing Team | Kawasaki | 12 | (United States) Jack Chambers | All |
| Bike It Kawasaki MX2 Racing Team | Kawasaki | 441 | (United Kingdom) Billy Askew | 1–2, 4–6 |
| Bike It Kawasaki MX2 Racing Team | Kawasaki | 579 | (United Kingdom) Bobby Bruce | |
| SC Sporthomes Husqvarna | Husqvarna | 19 | (United Kingdom) Sydney Putnam | 1–2, 5–6 |
| SC Sporthomes Husqvarna | Husqvarna | 44 | (United Kingdom) Elliott Banks-Browne | All |
| SC Sporthomes Husqvarna | Husqvarna | 422 | (United Kingdom) Charlie Heyman | 1, 4, 6 |
| Southside MX | KTM | 20 | (United Kingdom) William Farrow | 1–3 |
| Monster Mountain/Apico/Leatt | KTM | 22 | (United Kingdom) Jak Taylor | 1 |
| Ultimate Wheels Kawasaki | Kawasaki | 28 | (United Kingdom) Jack Timms | 3 |
| Jim Aim Racing | KTM | 34 | (United Kingdom) Joshua Bassett | 2 |
| Apex Redline MX/SBE/WPH/Pure | KTM | 40 | (United Kingdom) Jamie Wainwright | 1–3 |
| AMC Transport/Design Scaffolding | Husqvarna | 48 | (United Kingdom) Harry Bradley | 6 |
| DS Launir/Pukinn | Yamaha | 49 | (Iceland) Eiður Orri Pálmarsson | 2–4, 6 |
| MSR Kawasaki | Kawasaki | 53 | (New Zealand) Dylan Walsh | All |
| Algas Medical SAS TPC KTM | KTM | 57 | (United Kingdom) Kyle McNicol | All |
| Norman Watt Motorcycles | Kawasaki | 65 | (United Kingdom) James Mackrel | 3 |
| 723 RaceBikes | Fantic | 72 | (United Kingdom) Raife Broadley | 2, 4 |
| 723 RaceBikes/Westsole Racing | Husqvarna | 75 | (United Kingdom) Aaron Ongley | 1–2 |
| Seventy7 Racing | Kawasaki | 77 | (United Kingdom) Tobias Sammut | 1–3 |
| Drag'on Tek/Stolen Yamaha | Yamaha | 98 | (United Kingdom) Todd Kellett | 3 |
| Wulfsport/HRW Racing | Honda | 99 | (United Kingdom) Howard Wainwright | 4 |
| Dirt Store Kawasaki | Kawasaki | 100 | (United Kingdom) Tommy Searle | All |
| Dirt Store Kawasaki | Kawasaki | 119 | (United Kingdom) Mel Pocock | |
| Dirt Store Kawasaki | Kawasaki | 912 | (United Kingdom) Joel Rizzi | All |
| | Gas Gas | 101 | (United Kingdom) Lenny Ashley | 2 |
| Dirtwheelz/Moto Pro Suspension | Yamaha | 118 | (United Kingdom) Jaydon Murphy | 5–6 |
| RSR Plant Services KTM | KTM | 122 | (Republic of Ireland) Jake Sheridan | 1–2 |
| ASA United Gas Gas | Gas Gas | 163 | (United Kingdom) Ben Mustoe | 1–4 |
| JT166/Dirtwheelz | Yamaha | 166 | (United Kingdom) Josh Taylor | 1–2 |
| Gabriel SS24 KTM | KTM | 172 | (Netherlands) Cas Valk | All |
| Drysdale Motorcycles/Central Forestry | Gas Gas | 181 | (United Kingdom) Ryan Thomson | 1–2, 4 |
| Phoenix Evenstrokes Kawasaki | Kawasaki | 228 | (United Kingdom) Charlie Cole | All |
| IDS Transport Racing | KTM | 231 | (United Kingdom) Rory Jones | 4 |
| IDS Transport Racing | KTM | 711 | (United Kingdom) Joel Fisher | 4 |
| FUS Marsh Honda | Honda | 260 | (United Kingdom) Dylan Woodcock | 4 |
| Hardman Racing | Honda | 403 | (United Kingdom) Rowan Hill | 1 |
| AVT Campers KTM | KTM | 410 | (United Kingdom) James Barker | 1 |
| Lyfe Linez/HydroOG/Madison Cycles | KTM | 417 | (United Kingdom) Harrison Greenough | 6 |
| 426 Motorsport Team | KTM | 419 | (United Kingdom) Joe Brookes | 1–5 |
| Lings Powersports/DJK/Trell | Honda | 421 | (United Kingdom) Bayliss Utting | 1, 6 |
| Apico/Crown Windows | Husqvarna | 433 | (United Kingdom) Jack Lindsay | 1–2, 4 |
| SAS TPC KTM Racing Team | KTM | 511 | (United Kingdom) Steven Clarke | 1–5 |
| DK Offroad/FXR/Bell/Gaerne | KTM | 555 | (United Kingdom) Mckenzie Marshall | 1–3, 6 |
| K-Tech Aristo Cars Racing | KTM | 616 | (United Kingdom) Ollie Colmer | 1–5 |
| Concept Racing Yamaha | Yamaha | 661 | (United Kingdom) Josh Coleman | 1–5 |
| Lings Powersports | Honda | 687 | (United Kingdom) Jake Rackham | All |
| KKR | Gas Gas | 748 | (Latvia) Kristofers Kauliņš | 4 |
| | Yamaha | 807 | (United Kingdom) Luca Pegg | |
| Oakleaf Motorsports Honda | Honda | 925 | (United Kingdom) Lennox Dickinson | 1–4 |

=== Riders Championship ===
| Pos | Rider | Bike | LYN (England) | | CAN (England) | | BLA (England) | | HAW (England) | | SCH (England) | | PRE (England) | | Points |
|---|---|---|---|---|---|---|---|---|---|---|---|---|---|---|---|
| 1 | (Netherlands) Cas Valk | KTM | 2 | 1 | 4 | 2 | 1 | C | 3 | 3 | 4 | 5 | 1 | 1 | 236 |
| 2 | (United Kingdom) Tommy Searle | Kawasaki | 3 | 4 | 6 | 3 | 6 | C | 2 | 1 | 1 | 1 | 2 | 2 | 229 |
| 3 | (United States) Jack Chambers | Kawasaki | 1 | 3 | 2 | 1 | 2 | C | 13 | 2 | 10 | 4 | 4 | 6 | 206 |
| 4 | (United Kingdom) Joel Rizzi | Kawasaki | 6 | 2 | 1 | 5 | 3 | C | 1 | 4 | 5 | 2 | 7 | Ret | 193 |
| 5 | (New Zealand) Dylan Walsh | Kawasaki | 5 | 6 | 7 | 4 | 5 | C | 12 | 6 | 2 | 3 | 3 | 4 | 183 |
| 6 | (United Kingdom) Jake Nicholls | Honda | 4 | 30 | 10 | 8 | 4 | C | 7 | 9 | 8 | 9 | 6 | 5 | 142 |
| 7 | (United Kingdom) Alfie Jones | KTM | 9 | 8 | 12 | Ret | 10 | C | 10 | 8 | 9 | 14 | 10 | 11 | 109 |
| 8 | (United Kingdom) Billy Askew | Kawasaki | 31 | 9 | Ret | DNS | | | 4 | 5 | 20 | 7 | 5 | 3 | 97 |
| 9 | (United Kingdom) Joe Brookes | KTM | Ret | 5 | 8 | 10 | 13 | C | 5 | 10 | 14 | 6 | | | 97 |
| 10 | (United Kingdom) Taylor Hammal | Honda | 7 | 13 | 3 | 6 | 8 | C | 11 | 7 | | | | | 94 |
| 11 | (United Kingdom) Ollie Colmer | KTM | 10 | 14 | 11 | 14 | 9 | C | 6 | Ret | 11 | 8 | | | 85 |
| 12 | (United Kingdom) Glenn McCormick | KTM | | | 15 | 13 | 16 | C | 15 | 13 | 6 | 10 | 9 | 8 | 84 |
| 13 | (United Kingdom) Charlie Cole | Kawasaki | 17 | 11 | 14 | 11 | 11 | C | 21 | 11 | 7 | 13 | 11 | Ret | 83 |
| 14 | (United Kingdom) Steven Clarke | KTM | Ret | 12 | 21 | 12 | 12 | C | 8 | 12 | 12 | 11 | | | 68 |
| 15 | (United Kingdom) Elliott Banks-Browne | Husqvarna | Ret | 20 | 5 | 7 | Ret | C | Ret | Ret | 3 | 12 | Ret | Ret | 60 |
| 16 | (United Kingdom) Ben Mustoe | Gas Gas | 12 | 7 | 9 | 9 | 15 | C | Ret | DNS | | | | | 53 |
| 17 | (United Kingdom) Charlie Heyman | Husqvarna | 8 | 28 | | | | | 9 | Ret | | | 8 | 7 | 52 |
| 18 | (United Kingdom) Liam Bennett | KTM | 19 | 27 | 19 | 15 | 22 | C | 18 | 19 | 17 | 16 | 14 | 16 | 36 |
| 19 | (United Kingdom) Josh Coleman | Yamaha | 28 | 17 | 16 | 16 | 20 | C | 16 | 23 | 13 | 15 | | | 34 |
| 20 | (United Kingdom) Jamie Wainwright | KTM | 11 | 10 | 18 | 19 | 14 | C | | | | | | | 33 |
| 21 | (United Kingdom) Jake Rackham | Honda | 13 | 23 | 22 | 22 | 18 | C | 19 | 16 | 15 | 17 | 22 | 17 | 32 |
| 22 | (United Kingdom) Mckenzie Marshall | KTM | 14 | 18 | 27 | DNS | 25 | C | | | | | 13 | 15 | 24 |
| 23 | (United Kingdom) Kyle McNicol | KTM | 30 | 15 | 29 | 27 | 23 | C | 25 | 18 | Ret | 20 | 12 | 19 | 21 |
| 24 | (United Kingdom) Jaydon Murphy | Yamaha | | | | | | | | | 16 | 18 | 19 | 12 | 19 |
| 25 | (Brazil) Bernardo Tibúrcio | Honda | | | | | | | | | | | 15 | 9 | 18 |
| 26 | (United Kingdom) Raife Broadley | Fantic | | | 13 | 17 | | | 26 | 15 | | | | | 18 |
| 27 | (United Kingdom) Todd Kellett | Yamaha | | | | | 7 | C | | | | | | | 14 |
| 28 | (Iceland) Eiður Orri Pálmarsson | Yamaha | | | 26 | 29 | 19 | C | 28 | DNS | | | 16 | 14 | 14 |
| 29 | (United Kingdom) Harrison Greenough | KTM | | | | | | | | | | | 17 | 13 | 12 |
| 30 | (United Kingdom) Ben Franklin | KTM | 18 | 16 | Ret | 23 | 17 | C | 27 | DNS | | | | | 12 |
| 31 | (United Kingdom) Bayliss Utting | Honda | Ret | DNS | | | | | | | | | Ret | 10 | 11 |
| 32 | (United Kingdom) Howard Wainwright | Honda | | | | | | | 17 | 14 | | | | | 11 |
| 33 | (United Kingdom) Sydney Putnam | Husqvarna | 23 | 24 | 25 | 21 | | | | | 18 | 19 | 18 | 18 | 11 |
| 34 | (United Kingdom) Tyler Westcott | Gas Gas | 25 | 22 | 31 | 18 | 21 | C | 14 | 20 | | | | | 11 |
| 35 | (United Kingdom) Lennox Dickinson | Honda | 15 | 19 | 20 | 25 | 29 | C | 32 | 22 | | | | | 9 |
| 36 | (United Kingdom) Ryan Thomson | Gas Gas | 21 | 31 | 17 | 24 | | | 20 | 21 | | | | | 5 |
| 37 | (United Kingdom) James Barker | KTM | 16 | 29 | | | | | | | | | | | 5 |
| 38 | (United Kingdom) Rory Jones | KTM | | | | | | | 29 | 17 | | | | | 4 |
| 39 | (United Kingdom) Harry Bradley | Husqvarna | | | | | | | | | | | 20 | 20 | 2 |
| 40 | (United Kingdom) Harvey Cashmore | KTM | 26 | Ret | 33 | 31 | 26 | C | 30 | 26 | 19 | Ret | 21 | 21 | 2 |
| 41 | (Republic of Ireland) Jake Sheridan | KTM | 20 | 21 | 32 | DNS | | | | | | | | | 1 |
| 42 | (United Kingdom) George Hopkins | KTM | Ret | 25 | 23 | 20 | | | Ret | DNS | | | | | 1 |
| | (United Kingdom) Jack Lindsay | Husqvarna | 22 | 32 | 30 | DNS | | | 22 | Ret | | | | | 0 |
| | (United Kingdom) Dylan Woodcock | Honda | | | | | | | 23 | Ret | | | | | 0 |
| | (United Kingdom) Joel Fisher | KTM | | | | | | | 24 | 24 | | | | | 0 |
| | (United Kingdom) Aaron Ongley | Husqvarna | Ret | Ret | 24 | 26 | | | | | | | | | 0 |
| | (United Kingdom) Jak Taylor | KTM | 24 | Ret | | | | | | | | | | | 0 |
| | (United Kingdom) James Mackrel | Kawasaki | | | | | 24 | C | | | | | | | 0 |
| | (Latvia) Kristofers Kauliņš | Gas Gas | | | | | | | 31 | 25 | | | | | 0 |
| | (United Kingdom) William Farrow | KTM | Ret | 26 | 35 | 28 | 27 | C | | | | | | | 0 |
| | (United Kingdom) Henry Siddiqui | KTM | 27 | 33 | | | | | | | | | | | 0 |
| | (United Kingdom) Josh Taylor | Yamaha | Ret | DNS | 28 | Ret | | | | | | | | | 0 |
| | (United Kingdom) Callum McCaul | Gas Gas | | | | | 28 | C | | | | | | | 0 |
| | (United Kingdom) Tobias Sammut | Kawasaki | 29 | 34 | 36 | 33 | 31 | C | | | | | | | 0 |
| | (United Kingdom) Lenny Ashley | Gas Gas | | | Ret | 30 | | | | | | | | | 0 |
| | (United Kingdom) Jack Timms | Kawasaki | | | | | 30 | C | | | | | | | 0 |
| | (United Kingdom) Joshua Bassett | KTM | | | 34 | 32 | | | | | | | | | 0 |
| | (United Kingdom) Rowan Hill | Honda | Ret | DNS | | | | | | | | | | | 0 |
| Pos | Rider | Bike | LYN (England) | | CAN (England) | | BLA (England) | | HAW (England) | | SCH (England) | | PRE (England) | | Points |
