= 2026 British Motocross Championship =

British Motocross Competition in 2026

The 2026 ACU British Motocross Championship season (known for sponsorship reasons as the Motul ACU British Motocross Championship) was the 74th British Motocross Championship season. The series was contended over eight rounds, held between March and September.

Conrad Mewse was the reigning champion in the MX1 class, after picking up his fifth national title in 2025. In the MX2 class, Tommy Searle was the reigning champion, after taking his first title in the class and fifth overall in the previous season.

Whilst Mewse went on to successfully defend his title in MX1, it was Charlie Heyman who would take his first senior national title in the MX2 class.

Following the publishing of the initial championship calendar, a revised version was released in February 2026 after concerns the round held in south Wales clashed with the British round of the 2026 FIM Enduro World Championship.

== Race calendar and results ==
=== MX1 ===
Round	Date	Location	Race 1 Winner	Race 2 Winner	Round Winner
1	15 March	Hawkstone Park	(Spain) Oriol Oliver	(United Kingdom) Ben Watson	(United Kingdom) Ben Watson
2	5 April	Preston Docks	(Netherlands) Jeffrey Herlings	(Netherlands) Jeffrey Herlings	(Netherlands) Jeffrey Herlings
3	3 May	Lyng	(United Kingdom) Conrad Mewse	(United Kingdom) Ben Watson	(United Kingdom) Ben Watson
4	17 May	Landrake	(United Kingdom) Conrad Mewse	(United Kingdom) Conrad Mewse	(United Kingdom) Conrad Mewse
5	14 June	Monster Mountain	(Netherlands) Jeffrey Herlings	(Netherlands) Jeffrey Herlings	(Netherlands) Jeffrey Herlings
6	12 July	Canada Heights	(Spain) Oriol Oliver	(Spain) Oriol Oliver	(Spain) Oriol Oliver
7	9 August	Duns	(United Kingdom) Conrad Mewse	(United Kingdom) Conrad Mewse	(United Kingdom) Conrad Mewse
8	27 September	Blaxhall	(United Kingdom) Conrad Mewse	(United Kingdom) Conrad Mewse	(United Kingdom) Conrad Mewse

=== MX2 ===
Round	Date	Location	Race 1 Winner	Race 2 Winner	Round Winner
1	15 March	Hawkstone Park	(United Kingdom) Jamie Keith	(Netherlands) Gyan Doensen	(Netherlands) Gyan Doensen
2	5 April	Preston Docks	(United Kingdom) Charlie Heyman	(United Kingdom) Tommy Searle	(United Kingdom) Tommy Searle
3	3 May	Lyng	(United Kingdom) Charlie Heyman	(United Kingdom) Charlie Heyman	(United Kingdom) Charlie Heyman
4	17 May	Landrake	(United Kingdom) Charlie Heyman	(United Kingdom) Ben Mustoe	(United Kingdom) Ben Mustoe
5	14 June	Monster Mountain	(United Kingdom) Charlie Heyman	(United Kingdom) Charlie Heyman	(United Kingdom) Charlie Heyman
6	12 July	Canada Heights	(Netherlands) Gyan Doensen	(United Kingdom) Joe Brookes	(Netherlands) Gyan Doensen
7	9 August	Duns	(United Kingdom) Joe Brookes	(United Kingdom) Jamie Keith	(Netherlands) Gyan Doensen
8	27 September	Blaxhall	(United Kingdom) Tommy Searle	(United Kingdom) Billy Askew	(United Kingdom) Joe Brookes

=== Circuit locations ===
2026 British Motocross Championship locations

== MX1 ==
=== Participants ===
Team	Constructor	No	Rider	Rounds
	Yamaha	2	(United Kingdom) Josh Peters	6–8
Apico Factory Racing Honda	Honda	3	(United Kingdom) Josh Gilbert	1–2, 7–8
Apico Factory Racing Honda	Honda	16	(United Kingdom) Tom Grimshaw	All
Apico Factory Racing Honda	Honda	74	(United Kingdom) Tom Murphy	3–4
Destination MX/Safe and Sound Essex/Apico	Honda	74	(United Kingdom) Tom Murphy	1–2
Phoenix Tools Fantic Racing	Fantic	6	(United Kingdom) Carlton Husband	All
KES Commercials	KTM	7	(United Kingdom) Louie Kessell	1
	KTM	8	(United Kingdom) Shane Jones	5
Moto Cycle Racing	Yamaha	10	(United Kingdom) Jason Meara	2–8
Moto Cycle Racing	Yamaha	48	(United Kingdom) Adam Collings	8
SC Sportshomes Husqvarna	Husqvarna	19	(United Kingdom) Syd Putnam	1, 3–8
SC Sportshomes Husqvarna	Husqvarna	91	(United Kingdom) Charlie Putnam	All
SC Sportshomes Husqvarna	Husqvarna	249	(Canada) Tanner Ward	1–2
SC Sportshomes Husqvarna	Husqvarna	777	(Russia) Evgeny Bobryshev	8
T.A.L.K Access/T.A.L.K Scaffolding	Yamaha	22	(United Kingdom) Travis Steels	1–7
DRT Kawasaki	Kawasaki	23	(United Kingdom) Taylor Hammal	1–6, 8
Cult Moto	Triumph	24	(Netherlands) Kevin Simons	8
Cult Moto	KTM	771	(United Kingdom) Ollie Beamish	8
PCR E-Performance	Stark	26	(United Kingdom) Louis Brookes	1–2, 4–6, 8
SevenSeven2 Ride Kawasaki	Kawasaki	28	(United Kingdom) Charlie Cole	1–6
SevenSeven2 Ride Kawasaki	Kawasaki	41	(South Africa) Tristan Purdon	4–8
Lexa MX	Honda	41	(South Africa) Tristan Purdon	1–3
Absolute MX KTM powered by Mark McCann 64	KTM	33	(United Kingdom) Ben Edwards	All
Absolute MX KTM powered by Mark McCann 64	KTM	118	(United Kingdom) Jaydon Murphy	5
	Gas Gas	35	(United Kingdom) Jordan McCaw	8
Total Triumph	Triumph	40	(United Kingdom) Ezra Blackwell	All
	Husqvarna	42	(United Kingdom) Seth Manners	1
Splice Tech KTM	KTM	42	(United Kingdom) Rhys Whyment	7
HTM Motorcycles	Husqvarna	50	(United Kingdom) Martin Barr	2
	Honda	51	(United Kingdom) Hadley Coppard	6, 8
	Honda	56	(United Kingdom) Ross Millard	8
	Honda	57	(United Kingdom) Tony Craig	1
	Honda	72	(United Kingdom) Raife Broadley	1–2
Gabriel SS24 KTM	KTM	83	(Spain) Oriol Oliver	1–7
Honda HRC PETRONAS	Honda	84	(Netherlands) Jeffrey Herlings	2, 5
LPS/Dyce Carriers	Gas Gas	88	(United Kingdom) Lee Cameron	7
Chambers Racing KTM	KTM	95	(United Kingdom) Dan Thornhill	1, 8
Chambers Racing KTM	KTM	110	(United Kingdom) Harvey Cashmore	4–8
Chambers Racing KTM	KTM	456	(United Kingdom) Ollie Colmer	8
Chambers Racing KTM	KTM	584	(South Africa) Cameron Durow	3–5
Chambers Racing KTM	KTM	811	(United Kingdom) Adam Sterry	1–2, 5–8
Team Honda Motoblouz SR Motul	Honda	98	(United Kingdom) Todd Kellett	4
	Honda	103	(United Kingdom) Max Broadbelt	1–3, 6, 8
Substance JPR KTM	KTM	128	(United Kingdom) Michael Ellis	6, 8
Substance JPR KTM	KTM	957	(United Kingdom) Jake Preston	3–4
S Briggs Honda	Honda	133	(United Kingdom) Josh Greedy	All
GOMX	Yamaha	141	(United Kingdom) Nathan Green	1–2, 4, 6–8
Brenron Gear 4 KTM	KTM	150	(United Kingdom) Aaron Patstone	1
	Honda	150	(United Kingdom) Charley Irwin	7–8
JT166 Training Academy	Yamaha	166	(United Kingdom) Josh Taylor	4
	KTM	181	(United Kingdom) Gary Sharp	7
Crendon Tru7 Honda Racing	Honda	184	(United Kingdom) Jamie Carpenter	All
Crendon Tru7 Honda Racing	Honda	426	(United Kingdom) Conrad Mewse	All
Comptons Cars & Commercials	KTM	190	(United Kingdom) Luke Benstead	1
AJP Racing Team	Triumph	211	(Zimbabwe) Jayden Ashwell	1–2
Dirt Store Triumph Racing	Triumph	217	(United Kingdom) Eddie Wade	1–3
Dirt Store Triumph Racing	Triumph	260	(United Kingdom) Dylan Woodcock	6, 8
Dirt Store Triumph Racing	Triumph	919	(United Kingdom) Ben Watson	All
	Gas Gas	241	(United Kingdom) Nathan Claughan	8
	Honda	300	(United Kingdom) Charlie Hamlet	8
	Honda	301	(United Kingdom) Shaun Southgate	3
Westons	Honda	401	(United Kingdom) Jack Beniston	All
Southside MX	Honda	421	(United Kingdom) Bayliss Utting	1–3
Datum Group	Kawasaki	441	(United Kingdom) Joe Phillips	3
S Briggs	Honda	444	(United Kingdom) Jim Davies	6
PB Racing	KTM	447	(United Kingdom) Simon Booth	4–6, 8
Dannys Dirt Bike Store	Honda	500	(United Kingdom) Callum Murfitt	3, 6–8
Stark Future	Stark	511	(United Kingdom) Steven Clarke	3–4
Staffordshire Triumph Racing	Triumph	555	(United Kingdom) McKenzie Marshall	1–2
Twenty Club 579	Honda	579	(United Kingdom) Bobby Bruce	All
	Yamaha	592	(Sweden) Freddie Bartlett	1–2
DK Off Road powered by Bikesport	KTM	714	(United Kingdom) Brad Todd	1–2, 8
My Solar XTrue	Husqvarna	925	(United Kingdom) Lennox Dickinson	2–3
My Solar XTrue	Honda	925	(United Kingdom) Lennox Dickinson	5–8

=== Riders Championship ===
Pos	Rider	Bike	HAW (England)		PRE (England)		LYN (England)		LAN (England)		MON (Wales)		CAN (England)		DUN (Scotland)		BLA (England)		Points
1	(United Kingdom) Conrad Mewse	Honda	4	3	2	2	1	3	1	1	2	2	2	2	1	1	1	1	365
2	(United Kingdom) Ben Watson	Triumph	2	1	4	3	2	1	2	2	3	3	5	Ret	2	2	2	2	320
3	(Spain) Oriol Oliver	KTM	1	2	3	4	3	2	4	3	4	5	1	1	3	3			289
4	(United Kingdom) Taylor Hammal	Kawasaki	3	4	5	6	4	4	3	4	7	4	4	5			6	DNS	224
5	(South Africa) Tristan Purdon	Honda	7	6	24	7	11	5											199
5	(South Africa) Tristan Purdon	Kawasaki							5	9	5	6	3	4	4	6	Ret	DNS	199
6	(United Kingdom) Adam Sterry	KTM	5	5	6	5					6	7	6	3	6	5	4	4	194
7	(United Kingdom) Tom Grimshaw	Honda	17	Ret	12	9	5	6	7	5	8	9	7	6	7	7	11	5	194
8	(United Kingdom) Bobby Bruce	Honda	15	8	9	10	12	7	11	10	9	8	9	Ret	8	8	8	6	177
9	(United Kingdom) Jamie Carpenter	Honda	10	10	8	8	6	15	13	11	11	10	11	7	14	11	10	7	174
10	(United Kingdom) Ben Edwards	KTM	8	9	10	13	10	11	8	12	12	13	10	8	11	9	9	9	174
11	(United Kingdom) Jason Meara	Yamaha			13	14	7	9	10	13	10	15	8	Ret	9	10	22	14	120
12	(United Kingdom) Carlton Husband	Fantic	16	Ret	7	15	9	10	14	16	14	Ret	12	Ret	Ret	16	12	10	101
13	(Netherlands) Jeffrey Herlings	Honda			1	1					1	1							100
14	(United Kingdom) Josh Gilbert	Honda	6	Ret	Ret	DNS									5	4	5	3	85
15	(United Kingdom) Charlie Putnam	Husqvarna	18	15	22	Ret	19	16	16	15	15	14	13	11	15	13	35	15	78
16	(South Africa) Cameron Durow	KTM					8	8	9	7	13	11							70
17	(United Kingdom) Charlie Cole	Kawasaki	13	20	19	Ret	14	12	12	8	Ret	12	Ret	DNS					58
18	(United Kingdom) Travis Steels	Yamaha	Ret	Ret	23	21	15	17	15	14	16	Ret	14	16	12	17			53
19	(United Kingdom) Bayliss Utting	Honda	11	12	14	Ret	13	14											41
20	(United Kingdom) Lennox Dickinson	Husqvarna			11	Ret	Ret	Ret											40
20	(United Kingdom) Lennox Dickinson	Honda									17	17	Ret	Ret	10	15	16	29	40
21	(United Kingdom) Syd Putnam	Husqvarna	22	Ret			22	22	22	20	20	16	17	14	16	14	20	16	36
22	(United Kingdom) Dan Thornhill	KTM	12	16													13	11	32
23	(United Kingdom) Todd Kellett	Honda							6	6									30
24	(United Kingdom) Max Broadbelt	Honda	20	17	21	20	18	19					19	12			15	DNS	28
25	(United Kingdom) Ollie Colmer	KTM															7	8	27
26	(United Kingdom) Brad Todd	KTM	9	7	Ret	DNS											Ret	DNS	26
27	(United Kingdom) Dylan Woodcock	Triumph											15	9			14	DNS	25
28	(United Kingdom) Tom Murphy	Honda	24	Ret	15	DSQ	17	13	18	17									25
29	(Canada) Tanner Ward	Husqvarna	21	11	18	11													23
30	(Sweden) Freddie Bartlett	Yamaha	14	14	17	17													22
31	(United Kingdom) Charley Irwin	Honda													13	12	17	DNS	21
32	(Russia) Evgeny Bobryshev	Husqvarna															3	Ret	20
33	(United Kingdom) Josh Peters	Yamaha											16	13	Ret	DNS	19	17	19
34	(United Kingdom) Eddie Wade	Triumph	Ret	13	20	12	Ret	DNS											18
35	(United Kingdom) Callum Murfitt	Honda					20	20					20	Ret	18	18	26	13	17
36	(United Kingdom) Jack Beniston	Honda	30	18	Ret	22	23	21	17	21	19	20	21	Ret	17	21	21	18	17
37	(United Kingdom) Michael Ellis	KTM											Ret	10			18	19	16
38	(United Kingdom) Martin Barr	Husqvarna			16	16													10
39	(United Kingdom) Adam Collings	Yamaha															23	12	9
40	(United Kingdom) Harvey Cashmore	KTM							21	25	18	23	18	18	21	Ret	27	31	9
41	(United Kingdom) Shaun Southgate	Honda					16	18											8
42	(United Kingdom) Nathan Green	Yamaha	26	Ret	27	23			20	23			22	15	22	20	24	21	8
43	(United Kingdom) Josh Taylor	Yamaha							19	18									5
44	(United Kingdom) Raife Broadley	Honda	28	19	25	18													5
45	(United Kingdom) Rhys Whyment	KTM													19	19			4
46	(United Kingdom) Simon Booth	KTM							24	24	22	Ret	23	17			31	23	4
47	(United Kingdom) Louis Brookes	Stark	Ret	Ret	Ret	DNS			26	27	23	18	Ret	DNS			32	25	3
48	(United Kingdom) Jaydon Murphy	KTM									25	19							2
49	(United Kingdom) Steven Clarke	Stark					24	25	27	19									2
50	(United Kingdom) McKenzie Marshall	Triumph	Ret	Ret	26	19													2
51	(United Kingdom) Louie Kessell	KTM	19	21															2
52	(United Kingdom) Josh Greedy	Honda	25	23	28	24	25	26	23	26	21	21	24	19	24	22	34	Ret	2
53	(United Kingdom) Charlie Hamlet	Honda															28	20	1
54	(United Kingdom) Gary Sharp	KTM													20	Ret			1
55	(United Kingdom) Hadley Coppard	Honda											26	20			Ret	30	1
	(United Kingdom) Jake Preston	KTM					21	23	25	22									0
	(United Kingdom) Ezra Blackwell	Triumph	29	24	29	25	26	24	Ret	DNS	24	22	27	21	25	23	33	26	0
	(United Kingdom) Seth Manners	Husqvarna	27	22															0
	(United Kingdom) Ollie Beamish	KTM															29	22	0
	(United Kingdom) Aaron Patstone	KTM	23	Ret															0
	(United Kingdom) Lee Cameron	Gas Gas													23	Ret			0
	(United Kingdom) Jordan McCaw	Gas Gas															25	24	0
	(United Kingdom) Jim Davies	Honda											25	Ret					0
	(United Kingdom) Joe Phillips	Kawasaki					27	27											0
	(United Kingdom) Nathan Claughan	Gas Gas															Ret	27	0
	(United Kingdom) Ross Millard	Honda															36	28	0
	(Netherlands) Kevin Simons	Triumph															30	Ret	0
	(Zimbabwe) Jayden Ashwell	Triumph	Ret	DNS	Ret	Ret													0
	(United Kingdom) Luke Benstead	KTM	Ret	DNS															0
	(United Kingdom) Tony Craig	Honda	Ret	DNS															0
	(United Kingdom) Shane Jones	KTM									Ret	DNS							0
Pos	Rider	Bike	HAW (England)		PRE (England)		LYN (England)		LAN (England)		MON (Wales)		CAN (England)		DUN (Scotland)		BLA (England)		Points

== MX2 ==
=== Participants ===
Team	Constructor	No	Rider	Rounds
Phoenix Tools Fantic Racing	Fantic	2	(United Kingdom) John Adamson	1–2
Phoenix Tools Fantic Racing	Fantic	479	(United Kingdom) Josh Vail	1–7
Phoenix Tools Fantic Racing	Honda	479	(United Kingdom) Josh Vail	8
RKH Plastering & Renovations	Triumph	4	(United Kingdom) George Hopkins	1–5
Apico/Leatt/Masters of MX	KTM	5	(United Kingdom) Liam Bennett	All
Dirt Store Triumph Racing	Triumph	7	(United Kingdom) Eddie Wade	7–8
Dirt Store Triumph Racing	Triumph	100	(United Kingdom) Tommy Searle	All
Dirt Store Triumph Racing	Triumph	441	(United Kingdom) Billy Askew	All
LHR	Gas Gas	9	(United Kingdom) Lewis Hall	1
Team Concept Racing	Yamaha	10	(United Kingdom) Jonathan Roderick-Evans	All
Team Concept Racing	Yamaha	661	(United Kingdom) Josh Coleman	All
	Husqvarna	11	(United Kingdom) Ben Putnam	3, 6
FUS Marsh Honda	Honda	12	(United Kingdom) Finley Evans	8
FUS Marsh Honda	Honda	44	(United Kingdom) Elliott Banks-Browne	8
	Yamaha	14	(United Kingdom) Harrison Greenough	1–5, 8
	Triumph	17	(United Kingdom) Harry Lee	8
	Triumph	22	(United Kingdom) Sonny Rooney	1–3
	Gas Gas	22	(United Kingdom) Luke Richardson	6
Garland Powersports	KTM	24	(United Kingdom) Liam Garland	1, 3–8
Garland Powersports	KTM	134	(United Kingdom) Liam Knight	1–4
Crendon Tru7 Honda Racing	Honda	30	(United Kingdom) Charlie Richmond	All
	Honda	31	(United Kingdom) Charlie West	1–6
	KTM	31	(United Kingdom) Charlie West	7–8
WORX Total Triumph powered by MXology	Triumph	32	(United Kingdom) Calum Mitchell	1–2
Dixon Honda Racing	Honda	38	(United Kingdom) Gavin Stevenson	1–2, 8
PRO Industrial Roofing & Cladding	KTM	41	(United Kingdom) Malachi Allan	2
Otto Offroad	Yamaha	45	(United Kingdom) Harry Bradley	8
Absolute MX KTM powered by Mark McCann 64	KTM	46	(Netherlands) Davy Pootjes	1–2
Absolute MX KTM powered by Mark McCann 64	KTM	592	(United Kingdom) Freddie Bartlett	3–6
	KTM	592	(United Kingdom) Freddie Bartlett	7–8
Moto Cycle Racing	Yamaha	48	(United Kingdom) Adam Collings	1–4, 6–7
Moto Cycle Racing	Yamaha	71	(United Kingdom) Jack Meara	2–4, 6–7
Moto Cycle Racing	Gas Gas	71	(United Kingdom) Jack Meara	5
Radgie Ry Racing	KTM	55	(United Kingdom) Ryan Waggott	1–3, 7
AD Modular Racing Team	Kawasaki	58	(United Kingdom) Patrick Gilligan	8
AD Modular Racing Team	Husqvarna	999	(United Kingdom) Conner Challinor	8
Otto Offroad	Honda	67	(United Kingdom) Matt Bayliss	6
	Honda	72	(United Kingdom) Leon Ongley	1
	Fantic	72	(United Kingdom) Raife Broadley	3–4
Geartech Racing	Yamaha	72	(United Kingdom) Raife Broadley	6, 8
Westsole Fencing/723 Race Bikes	Gas Gas	75	(United Kingdom) Aaron Ongley	1
Westsole Fencing/723 Race Bikes	KTM	75	(United Kingdom) Aaron Ongley	8
Midwest Racing Team	Husqvarna	79	(South Africa) Wyatt McGregor	1–2, 6
S Briggs Honda	Honda	80	(United Kingdom) Zane Stephens	1, 4
	KTM	82	(United Kingdom) Ashden Barlow	3–7
HRW Racing	Honda	99	(United Kingdom) Howard Wainwright	1
Leeds Pallet Co	KTM	101	(United Kingdom) Tyla Hooley	1–3
Chambers Racing KTM	KTM	110	(United Kingdom) Harvey Cashmore	1–3
Chambers Racing KTM	KTM	172	(Netherlands) Cas Valk	8
Chambers Racing KTM	KTM	337	(United Kingdom) Glenn McCormick	All
Chambers Racing KTM	KTM	444	(South Africa) Tristan Durow	3–5
Chambers Racing KTM	KTM	456	(United Kingdom) Ollie Colmer	1–7
	Yamaha	111	(United Kingdom) James Thompson	1–5
	Honda	114	(United Kingdom) Jon Waghorn	3
	Yamaha	116	(United Kingdom) Ben Margetson	1–3, 7
Dirt Store Race Team	Triumph	119	(United Kingdom) George Corke	1
Dirt Store Race Team	Triumph	616	(United Kingdom) Max Corke	1
Jet Products Yamaha	Yamaha	121	(United Kingdom) Lewis Spratt	1–2, 4, 6
MXology K-Tech Triumph	Triumph	122	(Spain) David Braceras	3
	Husqvarna	151	(United Kingdom) Mitch Armour	7
ASA United Gas Gas	Gas Gas	163	(United Kingdom) Ben Mustoe	All
ASA United Gas Gas	Gas Gas	279	(United Kingdom) Harley O'Callaghan	6
ASA United Gas Gas	Gas Gas	522	(United Kingdom) Frankie Elwell	2
ASA United Gas Gas	Gas Gas	717	(United Kingdom) James Cottrell	8
MRE Contracts	KTM	167	(United Kingdom) Jack Evans	1–2
	KTM	170	(United Kingdom) Conor McGrath	6, 8
	Husqvarna	176	(United Kingdom) Jack Camwell	8
Goswell	Honda	184	(United Kingdom) Jamie Keith	All
J4M54 KTM powered by DMC Moto Birmingham	KTM	231	(United Kingdom) Rory Jones	1–3, 5–6, 8
Meredith MX	Kawasaki	271	(United Kingdom) Logan Wilcox	1–2
	Yamaha	272	(South Africa) Neville Bradshaw	1, 3
	Honda	272	(South Africa) Neville Bradshaw	8
	Gas Gas	278	(United Kingdom) Regan Rodgers	5
E Moto UK	Yamaha	300	(United Kingdom) Russell Griffiths	1
RCS	Yamaha	301	(United Kingdom) Olly McClurg	8
SC Sportshomes Husqvarna	Husqvarna	307	(Greece) Sotirios Fotakis	All
SC Sportshomes Husqvarna	Husqvarna	422	(United Kingdom) Charlie Heyman	All
EMEKS Moto/RFX	KTM	310	(United Kingdom) Lucy Barker	1
	Honda	312	(United Kingdom) Zac Pearson	1–2
	Honda	339	(United Kingdom) Joe Hall	3
MXology	Triumph	407	(United Kingdom) Jake Davies	1–2
	Husqvarna	415	(Latvia) Gabriels Golturenko	1–7
JK Racing Yamaha	Yamaha	418	(United Kingdom) Drew Stock	8
Nationwide Signs Triumph	Triumph	419	(United Kingdom) Joe Brookes	1–3
Nationwide Signs Honda	Honda	419	(United Kingdom) Joe Brookes	4, 6–8
SevenSeven2 Ride Kawasaki	Kawasaki	420	(Italy) Andrea Rossi	8
SevenSeven2 Ride Kawasaki	Kawasaki	912	(United Kingdom) Joel Rizzi	All
Lexa MX	Honda	448	(United Kingdom) Sam Menzies	1–4, 6–8
Southease MX	Yamaha	464	(United Kingdom) Travis Laughton	1
Dirthut	Yamaha	472	(United Kingdom) Max Harris	1–6, 8
WHW Services Race Team	Yamaha	491	(United Kingdom) Kayden Smith	1, 3, 8
3 Flo Madison Crescent Yamaha	Yamaha	531	(United Kingdom) Lucas Moncrieff	8
	KTM	545	(South Africa) Wesley McGavin	1
Gabriel SS24 KTM	KTM	574	(Netherlands) Gyan Doensen	All
	KTM	623	(United Kingdom) Charlie Hucklebridge	1–2
Lings	Honda	687	(United Kingdom) Jake Rackham	1–6, 8
	Triumph	702	(United Kingdom) Harrison McCann	1
	KTM	705	(United Kingdom) Harry Keet	8
Tech4 MX/Beer Trading/AD Modular	KTM	711	(United Kingdom) Joel Fisher	All
AJP Racing Team	Triumph	719	(United Kingdom) Jimmy Margetson	1–3
Chrome Bore Racing	KTM	777	(United Kingdom) Archie Hicks	All
JR Home Improvements/OffRoadWorld/MAX MX	Yamaha	807	(United Kingdom) Luca Pegg	1–7
My Solar XTrue Husqvarna	Husqvarna	925	(United Kingdom) Lennox Dickinson	1
Substance JPR KTM	KTM	957	(United Kingdom) Jake Preston	2, 6, 8

=== Riders Championship ===
Pos	Rider	Bike	HAW (England)		PRE (England)		LYN (England)		LAN (England)		MON (Wales)		CAN (England)		DUN (Scotland)		BLA (England)		Points
1	(United Kingdom) Charlie Heyman	Husqvarna	3	3	1	5	1	1	1	4	1	1	2	9	2	4	13	Ret	306
2	(Netherlands) Gyan Doensen	KTM	4	1	7	4	10	8	5	9	4	8	1	4	3	2	6	2	280
3	(United Kingdom) Tommy Searle	Triumph	7	11	3	1	24	2	3	3	5	2	DNS	DNS	4	5	1	5	241
4	(United Kingdom) Ben Mustoe	Gas Gas	15	2	8	8	3	5	2	1	Ret	Ret	4	5	7	3	3	7	239
5	(United Kingdom) Joe Brookes	Triumph	6	Ret	4	2	6	4											227
5	(United Kingdom) Joe Brookes	Honda							4	Ret			8	1	1	5	2	3	227
6	(United Kingdom) Billy Askew	Triumph	Ret	Ret	6	3	5	3	6	2	7	Ret	5	2	8	9	8	1	223
7	(United Kingdom) Jamie Keith	Honda	1	Ret	2	13	Ret	DNS	9	Ret	2	5	6	7	6	1	7	9	200
8	(United Kingdom) Charlie Richmond	Honda	8	6	16	9	4	11	7	7	3	3	10	8	11	Ret	11	6	200
9	(United Kingdom) Joel Rizzi	Kawasaki	5	5	25	11	11	6	11	6	11	4	9	3	9	11	4	Ret	192
10	(United Kingdom) Ollie Colmer	KTM	2	Ret	19	10	19	10	8	5	6	7	3	6	5	6			171
11	(United Kingdom) Josh Vail	Fantic	11	4	11	6	14	9	13	10	8	10	Ret	13	13	12			162
11	(United Kingdom) Josh Vail	Honda															12	8	162
12	(United Kingdom) Glenn McCormick	KTM	14	8	10	15	12	12	12	11	10	9	7	10	12	10	9	Ret	154
13	(Sweden) Freddie Bartlett	KTM					13	15	10	8	9	6	16	11	10	8	10	13	124
14	(United Kingdom) Liam Garland	KTM	Ret	DNS			9	16	14	12	12	Ret	13	12	15	Ret	14	17	76
15	(United Kingdom) Max Harris	Yamaha	17	Ret	14	Ret	7	17	18	15	13	14	DNS	DNS			18	Ret	56
16	(United Kingdom) John Adamson	Fantic	9	7	9	7													52
17	(United Kingdom) Liam Knight	KTM	10	9	12	24	8	18	17	Ret									52
18	(United Kingdom) Raife Broadley	Fantic					17	13	16	Ret									46
18	(United Kingdom) Raife Broadley	Yamaha											14	14			15	12	46
19	(United Kingdom) Josh Coleman	Yamaha	30	16	24	26	22	21	19	16	16	12	15	18	19	14	27	21	44
20	(United Kingdom) Tyla Hooley	KTM	12	10	15	12	20	14											43
21	(United Kingdom) Jake Rackham	Honda	22	Ret	17	17	29	Ret	25	17	18	19	11	16			16	16	42
22	(Spain) David Braceras	Triumph					2	7											36
23	(United Kingdom) Liam Bennett	KTM	26	Ret	31	19	Ret	25	20	18	14	Ret	12	19	16	16	23	20	35
24	(Netherlands) Cas Valk	KTM															5	4	34
25	(United Kingdom) Harrison Greenough	Yamaha	21	Ret	18	16	15	23	21	14	Ret	20					21	15	28
26	(United Kingdom) George Hopkins	Triumph	Ret	19	Ret	DNS	25	28	15	13	20	11							27
27	(Netherlands) Davy Pootjes	KTM	Ret	12	5	Ret													25
28	(United Kingdom) Eddie Wade	Triumph													14	13	20	14	23
29	(United Kingdom) Calum Mitchell	Triumph	Ret	13	13	14													23
30	(United Kingdom) Joel Fisher	KTM	20	18	27	20	21	24	Ret	26	15	13	21	21	20	19	24	28	22
31	(United Kingdom) Ben Putnam	Husqvarna					16	19					17	15					17
32	(United Kingdom) Rory Jones	KTM	25	15	32	25	30	32			17	18	19	20			29	24	16
33	(United Kingdom) Adam Collings	Yamaha	18	Ret	20	18	23	20	DNS	DNS			23	17	Ret	18			15
34	(United Kingdom) Jack Meara	Yamaha			DNQ	DNQ	DNQ	34	22	Ret			25	Ret					14
34	(United Kingdom) Jack Meara	Gas Gas									21	17			17	15			14
35	(United Kingdom) Lewis Hall	Honda	16	14															12
36	(United Kingdom) Elliott Banks-Browne	Honda															Ret	10	11
37	(Italy) Andrea Rossi	Kawasaki															Ret	11	10
38	(United Kingdom) Ryan Waggott	KTM	Ret	Ret	22	21	18	27							18	17			10
39	(United Kingdom) Luca Pegg	Yamaha	DNQ	DNQ	26	22	37	29	24	19	22	15	20	26	21	Ret			9
40	(United Kingdom) Jonathan Roderick-Evans	Yamaha	DNQ	DNQ	30	28	31	30	Ret	20	19	16	22	22	22	20	31	27	9
41	(United Kingdom) Lennox Dickinson	Husqvarna	13	Ret															8
42	(South Africa) Neville Bradshaw	Yamaha	19	DNS			26	22											6
42	(South Africa) Neville Bradshaw	Honda															17	22	6
43	(United Kingdom) Jimmy Margetson	Triumph	24	17	Ret	DNS	27	36											4
44	(United Kingdom) Gavin Stevenson	Honda	23	DNS	21	Ret											22	18	3
45	(Greece) Sotirios Fotakis	Husqvarna	DNQ	DNQ	29	31	36	31	Ret	24	23	22	18	Ret	Ret	22	26	31	3
46	(United Kingdom) Finley Evans	Honda															35	19	2
47	(United Kingdom) Drew Stock	Yamaha															19	Ret	2
48	(United Kingdom) Lucy Barker	KTM	29	20															1
	(Latvia) Gabriels Golturenko	Husqvarna	DNQ	DNQ	35	33	DNQ	DNQ	26	28	26	21	28	25	23	21			0
	(United Kingdom) Sonny Rooney	Triumph	27	21	23	23	28	26											0
	(United Kingdom) Zane Stephens	Honda	DNQ	DNQ					23	21									0
	(United Kingdom) Charlie West	Honda	DNQ	DNQ	DNQ	DNQ	DNQ	DNQ	29	22	27	25	27	27					0
	(United Kingdom) Charlie West	KTM													25	24	DNQ	DNQ	0
	(United Kingdom) Lewis Spratt	Yamaha	31	22	34	Ret			28	Ret			26	24					0
	(United Kingdom) Archie Hicks	KTM	DNQ	DNQ	37	32	32	33	27	27	25	23	30	23	24	23	DNQ	DNQ	0
	(United Kingdom) Ashden Barlow	KTM					34	35	30	23	Ret	24	29	29	Ret	25			0
	(United Kingdom) James Cottrell	Gas Gas															25	23	0
	(United Kingdom) Harvey Cashmore	KTM	Ret	23	DNQ	DNQ	33	Ret											0
	(South Africa) Tristan Durow	KTM					DNQ	DNQ	31	25	24	27							0
	(United Kingdom) Conor McGrath	KTM											24	Ret			32	29	0
	(United Kingdom) George Corke	Triumph	Ret	24															0
	(United Kingdom) Harry Bradley	Yamaha															Ret	25	0
	(United Kingdom) Sam Menzies	Honda	DNQ	DNQ	DNQ	DNQ	35	37	33	30			34	33	26	26	DNQ	DNQ	0
	(United Kingdom) Regan Rodgers	Gas Gas									28	26							0
	(United Kingdom) Lucas Moncrieff	Yamaha															28	26	0
	(United Kingdom) Logan Wilcox	Kawasaki	DNQ	DNQ	33	27													0
	(United Kingdom) Mitch Armour	Husqvarna													Ret	27			0
	(United Kingdom) Jake Davies	Triumph	DNQ	Ret	28	29													0
	(United Kingdom) Jake Preston	KTM			36	30							Ret	28			30	Ret	0
	(United Kingdom) Harrison McCann	Triumph	28	Ret															0
	(United Kingdom) James Thompson	Yamaha	DNQ	DNQ	DNQ	DNQ	DNQ	DNQ	32	29	Ret	DNS							0
	(United Kingdom) Luke Richardson	Gas Gas											31	30					0
	(United Kingdom) Aaron Ongley	Gas Gas	DNQ	DNQ															0
	(United Kingdom) Aaron Ongley	KTM															34	30	0
	(United Kingdom) Harley O'Callaghan	Gas Gas											33	31					0
	(South Africa) Wyatt McGregor	Husqvarna	DNQ	DNQ	DNQ	DNQ							32	32					0
	(United Kingdom) Harry Lee	Triumph															33	Ret	0
	(United Kingdom) Jack Evans	KTM	DNQ	DNQ	DNQ	34													0
	(United Kingdom) Kayden Smith	Yamaha	DNQ	DNQ			Ret	Ret									Ret	DNS	0
	(United Kingdom) Matt Bayliss	Honda											Ret	Ret					0
	(United Kingdom) Jack Camwell	Husqvarna															Ret	Ret	0
	(United Kingdom) Ben Margetson	Yamaha	DNQ	DNQ	DNQ	DNQ	DNQ	DNQ							Ret	DNS			0
	(United Kingdom) Max Corke	Triumph	Ret	DNS															0
	(United Kingdom) Malachi Allan	KTM			Ret	DNS													0
	(United Kingdom) Harry Keet	KTM															DNQ	Ret	0
	(United Kingdom) Charlie Hucklebridge	KTM	DNQ	DNQ	DNQ	DNQ													0
	(United Kingdom) Zac Pearson	Honda	DNQ	DNQ	DNQ	DNQ													0
	(United Kingdom) Howard Wainwright	Honda	DNQ	DNQ															0
	(United Kingdom) Travis Laughton	Yamaha	DNQ	DNQ															0
	(United Kingdom) Leon Ongley	Honda	DNQ	DNQ															0
	(South Africa) Wesley McGavin	KTM	DNQ	DNQ															0
	(United Kingdom) Russell Griffiths	Yamaha	DNQ	DNQ															0
	(United Kingdom) Frankie Elwell	Gas Gas			DNQ	DNQ													0
	(United Kingdom) Jon Waghorn	Honda					DNQ	DNQ											0
	(United Kingdom) Joe Hall	Honda					DNQ	DNQ											0
	(United Kingdom) Patrick Gilligan	Kawasaki															DNQ	DNQ	0
	(United Kingdom) Conner Challinor	Husqvarna															DNQ	DNQ	0
	(United Kingdom) Olly McClurg	Yamaha															DNQ	DNQ	0
Pos	Rider	Bike	HAW (England)		PRE (England)		LYN (England)		LAN (England)		MON (Wales)		CAN (England)		DUN (Scotland)		BLA (England)		Points
