= Conrad Mewse =

British motocross racer

- Nationality: British
- Born: 21 April 1999 (age 27)
- Current team: Crendon Tru7 Honda Racing
- Bike number: 426

Conrad Mewse (born 21 April 1999) is a British professional Motocross racer. He has previously competed full-time in the MX2 class of the FIM Motocross World Championship. He was the 2013 FIM Junior Motocross world champion in the 85cc class. In the same season he was also able to bring home the European Motocross Championship in the 85cc class.

Mewse represented has represented his country at the Motocross des Nations four times, most recently in 2025. In 2021, he helped them to finish third overall.

In addition to this, Mewse is a six-time British Motocross Champion, winning his most recent one in the MX1 class in 2026.

During the 2024 season, Mewse won the Patchquick Trophy and the Weston Beach Race, two notable events on the British calendar.

== Career ==
=== Junior career ===
Mewse had a successful international junior career, particularly when he was in the 85cc class. In 2012, the European Motocross Championship for the 85cc class (known as EMX85), was held as a single round event at the Matterley Basin track in his native Britain. Mewse achieved pole position in the class by winning the qualifying race and was leading the first race until a puncture forced him to finish in 13th. A win in the second race was enough for him to take the bronze medal in EMX85 for 2012 behind Davy Pootjes and David Herbreteau. This was coupled with finishing tenth overall in the 85cc class of the FIM Motocross Junior World Championship in the same year.

In 2013, Mewse became the Junior World Champion in the 85cc class at Jinín in Czech Republic by placing second in both races. In doing so he became the first British junior world champion in any class since 2005. Two weeks later, he was able to add the European 85cc title to his world title at Matterley Basin, winning both races in the process.

The next step for Mewse was to move up to the 125cc class in 2014. His first year saw him finish 26th overall in the 125 class of the Junior World Championship, held that year at Lierneux in Belgium. This was coupled with finishing 27th overall in the EMX125 European Championship series, with a best race finish of seventh. 2015 saw Mewse take a big step forward on the 125, finishing second overall in the Junior World Championship behind future world champion Maxime Renaux, when the event was staged in El Molar in Spain. In the EMX125 championship, Mewse fourth in the final standings – winning the final race of the season at Assen in Netherlands. His 2015 season was capped off by becoming Dutch Open Champion in the 125 class.

=== 250 career ===
On the back of his successful 2015 season, Mewse was signed by the factory Rockstar Energy Husqvarna team to compete in the EMX250 European Championship for 2016. His season started in the best way when he won the opening round of the season at Valkenswaard, taking both race wins in the process. Following this strong start to the season, Rockstar Energy Husqvarna promoted Mewse to the MX2 class of the 2016 FIM Motocross World Championship. Initially this change proved a big step for Mewse, but in the second half of the season he was able to post some impressive results – including a fifth place in race one at his home round. Despite missing seven rounds of the year this was good enough for him to finish 19th in the final standings.

Mewse was retained by the Rockstar Energy Husqvarna team in the MX2 world championship for 2017. This proved to be an up and down season for Mewse, finishing 16th in the final standings – picking up his first world championship top-three race finish in Latvia on the way.

For 2018, Mewse signed with the Hitachi KTM UK team to continue to contest the MX2 world championship as well as the British Motocross Championship in the MX2 class. In the world championship, Mewse had a competitive start to the season, with several top-six race finishes and a fourth place overall finish at Valkenswaard. This resulted in a 12th-place position in the final standings, despite missing several rounds. Domestically, Mewse won his first national MX2 title picking up four overall wins and nine race wins along the way. A wrist injury at round three of the 2019 British Motocross Championship meant that he missed most of the season after a strong start to his national title defence, with one round win and four race wins.

The COVID-19 affected 2020 season saw Mewse pick up his best overall finish in the MX2 world championship standings, finishing eighth overall with two third place race finishes being his best results. With no British Championship being held in 2020, it would take until 2021 for Mewse to win back his MX2 British crown. His world championship campaign was more tough experience as he dropped back to 16th in the final standings, missing three rounds along the way. Mewse received his first call-up to represent Great Britain at the annual Motocross des Nations in 2021, where his performance as the MX2 class rider helped the team secure second overall.

2022 was set to be Mewse's last year in the MX2 class. He was scheduled to compete again with the Hitachi KTM squad but a few months before the start of the season Mewse left the team. Working under his own privateer 426 Motorsports banner Mewse was able to capture his third British title with four overall wins and eight race wins. His MX2 world championship campaign came to an end mid-season after he dislocated his wrist following a crash at the British Championship. After recovering from this injury moved up to the MXGP category, making his debut for the Diga Procross KTM Racing replacing the injured Thomas Kjær Olsen. After racing three rounds without scoring points the partnership came to an end.

=== 450 career ===
For 2023, Mewse has signed with the Crendon Fastrack Honda team to focus on the MX1 British Championship. He started the season by competing in the revived British Arenacross Championship, finishing second in the final standings behind Tommy Searle. In Motocross, it would be a dominant performance for Mewse within the 2023 British Motocross Championship, winning his first MX1 class title in his debut season in the class. This included winning three of the last four rounds and seven individual races, coupled with this was taking the MX1 crown in the MX Nationals series making him champion of Britain's two most prominent domestic series. With domestic commitments, Mewse was only able to compete in one MXGP class round in the 2023 FIM Motocross World Championship, scoring four points in Switzerland. On the back of his result, Mewse was selected for the British team at the 2023 Motocross des Nations, making his second appearance at the event and helping his country to tenth overall.

Mewse started his 2024 season by again competing in the British Arenacross Championship. An ankle injury sustained during the third round when he was leading the championship saw him miss the remainder of the series. Following his return from injury, Mewse went toe-to-toe with 5-time FIM World Champion Jeffrey Herlings in the 2024 British Motocross Championship, beating the Dutchman on three occasions and winning the overall at round three. He made two wildcard appearances in the 2024 FIM Motocross World Championship, showing good speed on both occasions including an eighth in the qualifying race at the Belgian round. At the end of the season, he represented his country for the third time at the 2024 Motocross des Nations. After finishing fourth in his qualifying race, Mewse charged through the field in his first race to finish sixth. A mistake at the beginning of the last race saw him break a bone in his ankle but despite this he was still able to finish. Despite this injury, Mewse raced the following weekend in the gruelling 3-hour Weston Beach Race event in Weston-super-Mare, winning the main race for the first time.

Again competing in the British Arenacross Championship, Mewse finished runner up in the final standings of the Pro class, despite missing the opening round due to injury. Returning in time for the 2025 British Motocross Championship, Mewse dominated the MX1 class to take back the title he lost to Herlings the previous season. Winning both races at six of the eight rounds, he was only bettered when the Dutchman raced the double-header rounds in Scotland. Following this, Mewse was selected to compete for Great Britain at the 2025 Motocross des Nations, his fourth appearance at the event. It would be a tough edition of the event for the British team, finishing sixteenth overall. In the off-season, Mewse underwent an operation on lingering hip issues, the recover from which saw him miss the 2026 Arenacross Championship. This, along with competition from Ben Watson and Oriol Oliver, saw him wait until the third round of the 2026 British Motocross Championship to get a race win. Mewse would win three of the final five rounds overall, taking six race wins as part of this, to win his sixth senior national title.

== Honours ==
Motocross des Nations

- Team Overall: 2021 (United Kingdom) (silver)

FIM Junior Motocross World Championship

- 85cc class: 2013 (gold)
- 125cc class: 2015 (silver)

European Motocross Championship

- 85cc class: 2013 (gold) , 2012 (bronze)

British Motocross Championship

- MX1 class: 2023, 2025 & 2026 (gold) , 2024 (silver)
- MX2 class: 2018, 2021 & 2022 (gold)

MX Nationals (UK)

- MX1 Class: 2023 (gold)

Dutch Open Motocross Championship

- 125cc class: 2015 (gold)

British Arenacross Championship

- AX Pro class: 2023 & 2025 (silver)

Weston Beach Race

- 2024 (gold)

== Career statistics ==
=== Motocross des Nations ===
Year	Location	Nation	Class	Teammates	Team Overall	Individual Overall
2021	(Italy) Mantua	GBR	MX2	Ben Watson; Shaun Simpson	3rd	6th
2023	(France) Ernée	GBR	Open	Ben Watson; Josh Gilbert	10th	10th
2024	(United Kingdom) Matterley Basin	GBR	Open	Tommy Searle; Max Anstie	12th	5th
2025	(United States) Ironman	GBR	Open	Josh Gilbert; Dylan Walsh	16th	10th

=== FIM Motocross World Championship ===
==== By season ====
Season	Class	Number	Motorcycle	Team	Race	Race Wins	Overall Wins	Race Top-3	Overall Podium	Pts	Plcd
2016	MX2	426	Husqvarna	Rockstar Energy Husqvarna Factory Racing	22	0	0	0	0	126	19th
2017	MX2	426	Husqvarna	Rockstar Energy Husqvarna MX2	32	0	0	1	0	225	16th
2018	MX2	426	KTM	Hitachi KTM UK	28	0	0	0	0	220	12th
2019	MX2	426	KTM	Hitachi KTM fuelled by Milwaukee	8	0	0	0	0	40	31st
2020	MX2	426	KTM	Hitachi KTM fuelled by Milwaukee	34	0	0	2	0	365	8th
2021	MX2	426	KTM	Hitachi KTM fuelled by Milwaukee	28	0	0	0	0	203	16th
2022	MX2	426	KTM	426 Motorsports	14	0	0	0	0	133	19th
2022	MXGP	426	KTM	Diga Procross KTM Racing	6	0	0	0	0	0	NC
2023	MXGP	426	Honda	Crendon Fastrack Honda	2	0	0	0	0	4	55th
2024	MXGP	426	Honda	Crendon Tru7 Honda Racing	4	0	0	0	0	21	31st
Total					178	0	0	3	0	1337	
