= Robert Curson =

Robert Curson (c. 1460—1535) was an English courtier at the court of Henry VIII of England, and also that of emperor Maximilian I.

He was born in Blaxhall, Suffolk.
