= 2019 British Motocross Championship =

The 2019 British Motocross Championship is the 68th British Motocross Championship season. Evgeny Bobryshev will start the season as the defending champion in the MX1 class, with Conrad Mewse going into 2019 as the reigning champion in the MX2 class. The championship is due to start on 10 March at FatCat MotoParc, near Armthorpe and will conclude after eight rounds on 15 September at Landrake.

== MX1 ==
=== Calendar and Results ===
The championship will be contested over 8 rounds.

| Round | Date | Location | Race 1 Winner | Race 2 Winner | Round Winner |
|---|---|---|---|---|---|
| 1 | 10 March | (England) FatCat MotoParc | (United Kingdom) Shaun Simpson | (United Kingdom) Tommy Searle | (United Kingdom) Shaun Simpson |
| 2 | 14 April | (England) Lyng | (United Kingdom) Shaun Simpson | (United Kingdom) Tommy Searle | (United Kingdom) Tommy Searle |
| 3 | 5 May | (England) Canada Heights | (United Kingdom) Shaun Simpson | (United Kingdom) Shaun Simpson | (United Kingdom) Shaun Simpson |
| 4 | 2 June | (England) Blaxhall | (United Kingdom) Jake Millward | (United Kingdom) Tommy Searle | (United Kingdom) Tommy Searle |
| 5 | 30 June | (Northern Ireland) Desertmartin | (United Kingdom) Tommy Searle | (United Kingdom) Tommy Searle | (United Kingdom) Tommy Searle |
| 6 | 21 July | (England) Hawkstone Park | (United Kingdom) Shaun Simpson | (United Kingdom) Shaun Simpson | (United Kingdom) Shaun Simpson |
| 7 | 11 August | (England) Foxhill | (United Kingdom) Shaun Simpson | (United Kingdom) Shaun Simpson | (United Kingdom) Shaun Simpson |
| 8 | 15 September | (England) Landrake | (United Kingdom) Shaun Simpson | (United Kingdom) Elliott Banks-Browne | (United Kingdom) Shaun Simpson |

=== Participants ===
List of confirmed riders.

| Team | Constructor | No | Rider | Rounds |
|---|---|---|---|---|
| Hydrogarden Suzuki | Suzuki | 4 | (United Kingdom) Harry Bradley | 7 |
| Cheddar MX Store | Honda | 8 | (United Kingdom) Luke Hawkins | 7 |
| ASA United KTM | KTM | 9 | (United Kingdom) Mel Pocock | All |
| ASA United KTM | KTM | 155 | (United Kingdom) Jack Brunell | 7 |
| Dyers Auto Service | Honda | 10 | (United Kingdom) Ryan Nock | 3 |
| Norman Watt Kawasaki | Kawasaki | 10 | (United Kingdom) Jason Meara | 4–5 |
| Norman Watt Kawasaki | Kawasaki | 160 | (United Kingdom) John Meara | 5, 8 |
| Phoenix Tools Apico Kawasaki | Kawasaki | 10 | (United Kingdom) Jason Meara | 6 |
| Phoenix Tools Apico Kawasaki | Kawasaki | 37 | (Estonia) Gert Krestinov | 1–5, 8 |
| G & JP - Fountain Builders | Yamaha | 11 | (United Kingdom) Ben Putnam | 1–4, 6–7 |
| Geartec Husqvarna Racing | Husqvarna | 14 | (United Kingdom) Luke Burton | 1, 6 |
| Geartec Husqvarna Racing | Husqvarna | 44 | (United Kingdom) Elliott Banks-Browne | 6–8 |
| MSR Redline Yamaha | Yamaha | 17 | (United Kingdom) Luke Smith | 1–6, 8 |
| Jim Aim Motorcycles | KTM | 19 | (United Kingdom) Rheis Morter | 4 |
| Jim Aim Motorcycles | KTM | 72 | (United Kingdom) Connor Hughes | 1–4, 7 |
| Fluid CCM Racing | Husqvarna | 22 | (United Kingdom) Richard McKeown | 1–2, 4 |
| RFX KTM Racing Powered By PAR Homes | KTM | 24 | (United Kingdom) Shaun Simpson | All |
| RFX KTM Racing Powered By PAR Homes | KTM | 360 | (United Kingdom) Nathan Dixon | 1–5 |
| Apico Husqvarna | Husqvarna | 25 | (United Kingdom) Jamie Law | 1–2, 4–8 |
| Apico Husqvarna | Husqvarna | 162 | (Republic of Ireland) Stuart Edmonds | All |
| 4 Two Two Racing | KTM | 26 | (United Kingdom) Ben Lambert-Williams | 3 |
| Bikesport Newcastle | KTM | 28 | (United Kingdom) John Robson | All |
| Bikesport Newcastle | Kawasaki | 31 | (United Kingdom) Robbie Dowson | 1–5, 8 |
| | KTM | 35 | (United Kingdom) Jordan McCaw | 5 |
| Buildbase Honda Racing | Honda | 45 | (United Kingdom) Jake Nicholls | 6–7 |
| Buildbase Honda Racing | Honda | 66 | (United Kingdom) Lewis Tombs | 1–4, 6–8 |
| | KTM | 46 | (United Kingdom) Stuart Nesbitt | 5 |
| Bikesport Newcastle/Danger UK | Honda | 49 | (United Kingdom) John Adamson | All |
| Cheddar MX Store/HTF Construction | KTM | 54 | (United Kingdom) Corey Hockey | 1 |
| EVL Racing | Suzuki | 56 | (United Kingdom) Edward Briscoe | 7 |
| Putoline Husqvarna Planet Suspension Racing | Husqvarna | 57 | (United Kingdom) Tony Craig | 1–3, 5–6 |
| RHR Racing | Yamaha | 57 | (United Kingdom) Tony Craig | 7–8 |
| RHR Racing | Yamaha | 119 | (United Kingdom) Ryan Houghton | 1–2, 4 |
| Verde Substance KTM | KTM | 60 | (United Kingdom) Brad Anderson | All |
| Hitachi KTM UK | KTM | 63 | (United Kingdom) Oliver Benton | All |
| Dixon Honda Racing | Honda | 65 | (United Kingdom) Jacob Joyce | All |
| Derbyshire Offroad Centre | KTM | 68 | (United Kingdom) Joshua Bentley | 2–6 |
| Herts MX/MMX74 Coaching | Honda | 74 | (United Kingdom) Patrick Major | 1–3 |
| Cab Screens Deos Group Racing | Honda | 95 | (United Kingdom) Dan Thornhill | 1–2 |
| Cab Screens Deos Group Racing | Honda | 151 | (Estonia) Harri Kullas | 1–4, 6–8 |
| Cab Screens Deos Group Racing | Honda | 407 | (United Kingdom) Adam Chatfield | 3 |
| St Blazey MX | Yamaha | 98 | (United Kingdom) Todd Kellett | 1, 5 |
| BOS Factory Holeshot Kawasaki | Kawasaki | 100 | (United Kingdom) Tommy Searle | All |
| | KTM | 118 | (United Kingdom) Kieran Clarke | 4 |
| Stevenson Engineering | KTM | 131 | (United Kingdom) Henry Siddiqui | 3 |
| Dulson Training - Marsh MX | Husqvarna | 171 | (United Kingdom) Zac Stealey | 1–2, 4–7 |
| MNE Kawasaki | Kawasaki | 173 | (United Kingdom) Luke Norris | 2–4, 6 |
| GH Motorcycles - G & B Finch | Husqvarna | 190 | (United Kingdom) Luke Benstead | 1–4, 6 |
| | KTM | 199 | (United Kingdom) Jake Edey | 2 |
| Big Van World/Geartec Husqvarna | Husqvarna | 200 | (United Kingdom) James Dunn | 1–5 |
| Holeshot Motocross | Kawasaki | 214 | (United Kingdom) Lewis Trickett | 7 |
| DK Kawasaki | Kawasaki | 272 | (South Africa) Neville Bradshaw | 6 |
| Danger D3 Honda | Honda | 293 | (United Kingdom) Ryan McLean | 1–3 |
| Site Sealants DCL | Husqvarna | 295 | (United Kingdom) Ross Rutherford | 1–5 |
| Colwyn Bay Honda | Honda | 300 | (United Kingdom) Charlie Hamlet | 1 |
| Herts MX/Honda UK | Honda | 301 | (United Kingdom) Shaun Southgate | 1–2, 6–8 |
| | KTM | 302 | (South Africa) Brad Woodroffe | 4, 7 |
| Chambers Racing | Husqvarna | 303 | (United Kingdom) Jake Millward | All |
| Chambers Racing | Husqvarna | 311 | (United Kingdom) Aaron McCarroll | All |
| Jeff's Valeting & Iron Wheels Wales | Husqvarna | 333 | (United Kingdom) Josh Greedy | 6, 8 |
| | Husqvarna | 411 | (United Kingdom) Declan Whittle | 1–4, 6–7 |
| Acerbis UK | KTM | 447 | (United Kingdom) Simon Booth | 1–4, 6–8 |
| Edgar Electrical Lyons Brothers Peugeot | KTM | 651 | (United Kingdom) James Mackrel | 5 |
| Motolife UK - BRP Imports Racing | Yamaha | 691 | (United Kingdom) Aidan Wigger | 1–7 |
| Gabriel Insulation Seal Moto | Yamaha | 714 | (United Kingdom) Brad Todd | 1–4 |
| Crescent Yamaha MX Team | Yamaha | 731 | (United Kingdom) Jake Shipton | All |

=== Riders Championship ===
| Pos | Rider | Bike | FAT (England) | | LYN (England) | | CAN (England) | | BLA (England) | | DES (Northern Ireland) | | HAW (England) | | FOX (England) | | LAN (England) | | Points |
|---|---|---|---|---|---|---|---|---|---|---|---|---|---|---|---|---|---|---|---|
| 1 | (United Kingdom) Searle | Kawasaki | 3 | 1 | 2 | 1 | 2 | 2 | 3 | 1 | 1 | 1 | 2 | 2 | 5 | 3 | 4 | 7 | 343 |
| 2 | (United Kingdom) Simpson | KTM | 1 | 2 | 1 | 2 | 1 | 1 | 7 | 4 | Ret | Ret | 1 | 1 | 1 | 1 | 1 | 3 | 321 |
| 3 | (United Kingdom) Millward | Husqvarna | 12 | 3 | 6 | 8 | 3 | 5 | 1 | Ret | 2 | 5 | 5 | 5 | 3 | 6 | 3 | 6 | 258 |
| 4 | (Estonia) Kullas | Honda | 2 | Ret | 5 | 3 | 8 | 3 | 21 | 2 | | | 3 | 4 | 2 | 5 | 2 | 2 | 233 |
| 5 | (United Kingdom) Pocock | KTM | 4 | Ret | 3 | 7 | 5 | Ret | 5 | 5 | 23 | 2 | 4 | 7 | 4 | 4 | 5 | 8 | 219 |
| 6 | (United Kingdom) Anderson | KTM | 8 | 12 | 11 | 10 | 4 | 9 | 4 | 6 | 12 | 11 | 10 | 11 | 10 | 8 | 7 | 4 | 202 |
| 7 | (United Kingdom) Shipton | Yamaha | 7 | Ret | 14 | 11 | Ret | 10 | 2 | 21 | 4 | 4 | 6 | 10 | 6 | 7 | 11 | 9 | 177 |
| 8 | (Estonia) Krestinov | Kawasaki | 11 | 7 | 7 | 6 | 6 | 4 | 6 | 3 | 6 | 10 | | | | | 8 | 10 | 171 |
| 9 | (United Kingdom) Tombs | Honda | 5 | 4 | 4 | 4 | 12 | 6 | Ret | DNS | | | 14 | 9 | 7 | 9 | 6 | 5 | 170 |
| 10 | (United Kingdom) Adamson | Honda | 9 | 24 | 10 | 14 | 9 | 8 | 11 | 8 | 8 | 6 | 16 | 19 | 11 | 16 | 14 | 14 | 142 |
| 11 | (United Kingdom) Law | Husqvarna | 17 | 8 | 20 | 17 | | | 13 | 14 | 11 | 9 | 11 | 6 | 9 | 10 | 9 | 11 | 129 |
| 12 | (Republic of Ireland) Edmonds | Husqvarna | 23 | 14 | Ret | 18 | 7 | 11 | 15 | 19 | 5 | 12 | Ret | Ret | 12 | 18 | 10 | 12 | 99 |
| 13 | (United Kingdom) Todd | Yamaha | 6 | 9 | 12 | 9 | Ret | 7 | 9 | 13 | | | | | | | | | 82 |
| 14 | (United Kingdom) Dunn | Husqvarna | Ret | DNS | 8 | Ret | 11 | Ret | 8 | 7 | 15 | 3 | | | | | | | 76 |
| 15 | (United Kingdom) Dowson | Kawasaki | 18 | Ret | 22 | 16 | 10 | 12 | 10 | 9 | 16 | 8 | | | | | 15 | Ret | 75 |
| 16 | (United Kingdom) Ja. Meara | Kawasaki | | | | | | | 16 | 11 | 3 | 19 | 7 | 8 | | | | | 64 |
| 17 | (United Kingdom) Craig | Husqvarna | 20 | 25 | 13 | 20 | 18 | 15 | | | 10 | 20 | 13 | 20 | 20 | 11 | 13 | 16 | 64 |
| 18 | (United Kingdom) Banks-Browne | Husqvarna | | | | | | | | | | | Ret | Ret | 8 | 2 | Ret | 1 | 60 |
| 19 | (United Kingdom) Dixon | KTM | Ret | 11 | Ret | 13 | 22 | 19 | Ret | 10 | 9 | 7 | | | | | | | 57 |
| 20 | (United Kingdom) Smith | Yamaha | 24 | 15 | 21 | 23 | 14 | 18 | 17 | 12 | 14 | Ret | Ret | 17 | | | 12 | 13 | 57 |
| 21 | (United Kingdom) Houghton | Yamaha | 10 | 5 | 9 | 5 | | | Ret | DNS | | | | | | | | | 55 |
| 22 | (United Kingdom) Benstead | Husqvarna | 16 | Ret | 18 | Ret | 16 | 17 | 12 | Ret | | | 12 | 13 | | | | | 43 |
| 23 | (United Kingdom) Nicholls | Honda | | | | | | | | | | | 8 | 3 | DNS | DNS | | | 33 |
| 24 | (United Kingdom) Burton | Husqvarna | 13 | 10 | | | | | | | | | 9 | Ret | | | | | 31 |
| 25 | (United Kingdom) Jo. Meara | Kawasaki | | | | | | | | | 7 | 13 | | | | | Ret | 15 | 28 |
| 26 | (United Kingdom) Whittle | Husqvarna | 30 | 23 | 17 | 21 | 19 | 20 | Ret | 15 | | | 25 | 15 | 18 | 15 | | | 28 |
| 27 | (United Kingdom) Putnam | Yamaha | 22 | Ret | 25 | 12 | 17 | 23 | 18 | 18 | | | Ret | 18 | 19 | 17 | | | 28 |
| 28 | (United Kingdom) Rutherford | Husqvarna | Ret | Ret | 16 | 26 | 15 | 16 | 14 | 17 | Ret | DNS | | | | | | | 27 |
| 29 | (United Kingdom) McCarroll | Husqvarna | 25 | 16 | 19 | 15 | 25 | 31 | 27 | 22 | 21 | 17 | 20 | 16 | 21 | 25 | 21 | 18 | 26 |
| 30 | (United Kingdom) Joyce | Honda | 15 | 17 | 26 | 28 | Ret | Ret | 23 | 25 | 18 | 14 | 18 | 23 | 26 | 23 | 20 | 20 | 25 |
| 31 | (United Kingdom) Southgate | Honda | 28 | 18 | Ret | Ret | | | | | | | 19 | 22 | 14 | 19 | 16 | 17 | 23 |
| 32 | (United Kingdom) Thornhill | Honda | 14 | 6 | 24 | Ret | | | | | | | | | | | | | 22 |
| 33 | (United Kingdom) Hawkins | Honda | | | | | | | | | | | | | 13 | 13 | | | 16 |
| 34 | (United Kingdom) Chatfield | Honda | | | | | 13 | 13 | | | | | | | | | | | 16 |
| 35 | (South Africa) Bradshaw | Kawasaki | | | | | | | | | | | 15 | 12 | | | | | 15 |
| 36 | (United Kingdom) Brunell | KTM | | | | | | | | | | | | | 16 | 12 | | | 14 |
| 37 | (United Kingdom) Norris | Kawasaki | | | 15 | 25 | 20 | 14 | Ret | DNS | | | Ret | DNS | | | | | 14 |
| 38 | (United Kingdom) Trickett | Kawasaki | | | | | | | | | | | | | 15 | 14 | | | 13 |
| 39 | (United Kingdom) Bentley | KTM | | | 23 | 22 | Ret | 27 | 20 | 23 | Ret | Ret | 17 | 14 | | | | | 12 |
| 40 | (United Kingdom) Hughes | KTM | 26 | 19 | Ret | 31 | 21 | 21 | 22 | 16 | | | | | 17 | 20 | | | 12 |
| 41 | (United Kingdom) McKeown | Husqvarna | Ret | 13 | Ret | 24 | | | 19 | 20 | | | | | | | | | 11 |
| 42 | (United Kingdom) Benton | KTM | 29 | 20 | 31 | 29 | Ret | 26 | 25 | 24 | 20 | 18 | Ret | 24 | 25 | 22 | 17 | 21 | 9 |
| 43 | (United Kingdom) Kellett | Yamaha | Ret | Ret | | | | | | | 13 | Ret | | | | | | | 8 |
| 44 | (United Kingdom) McCaw | KTM | | | | | | | | | 19 | 15 | | | | | | | 8 |
| 45 | (United Kingdom) Robson | KTM | 21 | 27 | 27 | Ret | 26 | 25 | Ret | DNS | Ret | 16 | 21 | 21 | 24 | Ret | Ret | 19 | 7 |
| 46 | (United Kingdom) Mackrel | KTM | | | | | | | | | 17 | Ret | | | | | | | 4 |
| 47 | (United Kingdom) McLean | Honda | 19 | 21 | 28 | 19 | 23 | 22 | | | | | | | | | | | 4 |
| 48 | (United Kingdom) Greedy | Husqvarna | | | | | | | | | | | 22 | 26 | | | 18 | 23 | 3 |
| 49 | (United Kingdom) Booth | KTM | 31 | 26 | 33 | 30 | 27 | 28 | 29 | 29 | | | 23 | 27 | 28 | 27 | 19 | 22 | 2 |
| | (United Kingdom) Briscoe | Suzuki | | | | | | | | | | | | | 23 | 21 | | | 0 |
| | (United Kingdom) Stealey | Husqvarna | 27 | 22 | 29 | 27 | | | 26 | 26 | Ret | DNS | 24 | 25 | 29 | 24 | | | 0 |
| | (South Africa) Woodroffe | KTM | | | | | | | 24 | Ret | | | | | 22 | Ret | | | 0 |
| | (United Kingdom) Nesbitt | KTM | | | | | | | | | 22 | Ret | | | | | | | 0 |
| | (United Kingdom) Major | Honda | Ret | Ret | 30 | Ret | 24 | 24 | | | | | | | | | | | 0 |
| | (United Kingdom) Wigger | Yamaha | 32 | Ret | 34 | 33 | 29 | 30 | 30 | Ret | 24 | DNS | 26 | 28 | Ret | DNS | | | 0 |
| | (United Kingdom) Bradley | Suzuki | | | | | | | | | | | | | 27 | 26 | | | 0 |
| | (United Kingdom) Morter | KTM | | | | | | | 28 | 27 | | | | | | | | | 0 |
| | (United Kingdom) Clarke | KTM | | | | | | | 31 | 28 | | | | | | | | | 0 |
| | (United Kingdom) Nock | Honda | | | | | 28 | 32 | | | | | | | | | | | 0 |
| | (United Kingdom) Siddiqui | KTM | | | | | 30 | 29 | | | | | | | | | | | 0 |
| | (United Kingdom) Edey | KTM | | | 32 | 32 | | | | | | | | | | | | | 0 |
| | (United Kingdom) Lambert-Williams | KTM | | | | | Ret | 33 | | | | | | | | | | | 0 |
| | (United Kingdom) Hockey | KTM | Ret | Ret | | | | | | | | | | | | | | | 0 |
| | (United Kingdom) Hamlet | Honda | Ret | DNS | | | | | | | | | | | | | | | 0 |
| Pos | Rider | Bike | FAT (England) | | LYN (England) | | CAN (England) | | BLA (England) | | DES (Northern Ireland) | | HAW (England) | | FOX (England) | | LAN (England) | | Points |

== MX2 ==
=== Calendar and Results ===
The championship will be contested over 8 rounds.

| Round | Date | Location | Race 1 Winner | Race 2 Winner | Round Winner |
|---|---|---|---|---|---|
| 1 | 10 March | (England) FatCat MotoParc | (United Kingdom) Conrad Mewse | (Netherlands) Bas Vaessen | (Netherlands) Bas Vaessen |
| 2 | 14 April | (England) Lyng | (United Kingdom) Conrad Mewse | (United Kingdom) Conrad Mewse | (United Kingdom) Conrad Mewse |
| 3 | 5 May | (England) Canada Heights | (United Kingdom) Conrad Mewse | (Sweden) Alvin Östlund | (Sweden) Alvin Östlund |
| 4 | 2 June | (England) Blaxhall | (United Kingdom) Josh Gilbert | (Netherlands) Bas Vaessen | (United Kingdom) Josh Gilbert |
| 5 | 30 June | (Northern Ireland) Desertmartin | (Netherlands) Bas Vaessen | (New Zealand) Dylan Walsh | (Netherlands) Bas Vaessen |
| 6 | 21 July | (England) Hawkstone Park | (New Zealand) Dylan Walsh | (New Zealand) Dylan Walsh | (New Zealand) Dylan Walsh |
| 7 | 11 August | (England) Foxhill | (New Zealand) Dylan Walsh | (New Zealand) Dylan Walsh | (New Zealand) Dylan Walsh |
| 8 | 15 September | (England) Landrake | (New Zealand) Dylan Walsh | (New Zealand) Dylan Walsh | (New Zealand) Dylan Walsh |

=== Participants ===
List of confirmed riders.

| Team | Constructor | No | Rider | Rounds |
|---|---|---|---|---|
| Buildbase Honda Racing | Honda | 3 | (United Kingdom) Josh Gilbert | All |
| IDS Transport - Bridgestone | Yamaha | 4 | (United Kingdom) Robert Yates | All |
| Phoenix Tools Apico Kawasaki | Kawasaki | 6 | (United Kingdom) Carlton Husband | 1–2, 7 |
| Team Green Kawasaki | Kawasaki | 9 | (United Kingdom) Lewis Hall | All |
| Team Green Kawasaki | Kawasaki | 429 | (United Kingdom) Keenan Hird | 1–2 |
| Trevor Pope KTM UK | KTM | 10 | (United Kingdom) Michael Ellis | All |
| Apico Husqvarna | Husqvarna | 11 | (United Kingdom) Matt Burrows | 1–3, 6–8 |
| The X Pro Range | KTM | 13 | (United Kingdom) Aaron-Lee Hanson | 1–4, 6–7 |
| Craigs Motorcycles Motoshack | Husqvarna | 19 | (United Kingdom) Tom Neal | All |
| SF Racing | KTM | 32 | (United Kingdom) Calum Mitchell | 1–4, 7–8 |
| Pure Building Services Ltd | KTM | 40 | (United Kingdom) Jamie Wainwright | 1–2 |
| Apico - Putoline - Pro Carbon | KTM | 41 | (United Kingdom) Alexander Brown | 1–3 |
| Vega Solutions - Pol Motors | KTM | 48 | (United Kingdom) Adam Collings | 1, 3–7 |
| Crescent Yamaha MX Team | Yamaha | 50 | (United Kingdom) Martin Barr | All |
| Advanced Plastering | Kawasaki | 51 | (United States) Ezra Hastings | 3 |
| | Husqvarna | 52 | (United Kingdom) Jack Bintcliffe | 6 |
| Revo Husqvarna UK | Husqvarna | 53 | (New Zealand) Dylan Walsh | All |
| Revo Husqvarna UK | Husqvarna | 161 | (Sweden) Alvin Östlund | All |
| HCR Yamaha - Apico Factory Racing | Yamaha | 61 | (United Kingdom) Tom Grimshaw | All |
| HCR Yamaha - Apico Factory Racing | Yamaha | 111 | (United Kingdom) Max Ingham | 8 |
| HCR Yamaha - Apico Factory Racing | Yamaha | 365 | (United Kingdom) Sam Nunn | 4–7 |
| Lyons Brothers Peugeot | Yamaha | 65 | (United Kingdom) James Mackrel | 1 |
| Westsole Fencing | KTM | 75 | (United Kingdom) Aaron Ongley | 2 |
| Chambers Racing | Husqvarna | 77 | (United Kingdom) Jay Hague | 1, 5–7 |
| Chambers Racing | Husqvarna | 300 | (United Kingdom) Ben Franklin | 1–7 |
| Husky Sport | Husqvarna | 82 | (United Kingdom) Charlie Cole | 2–3, 6–8 |
| Husky Sport | Husqvarna | 184 | (United Kingdom) James Carpenter | 5 |
| RFX KTM Racing Powered By PAR Homes | KTM | 91 | (United Kingdom) Charlie Putnam | 1–6 |
| Hitachi KTM Fuelled By Milwaukee | KTM | 98 | (Netherlands) Bas Vaessen | 1–5 |
| Hitachi KTM Fuelled By Milwaukee | KTM | 426 | (United Kingdom) Conrad Mewse | 1–3, 8 |
| Hitachi KTM Fuelled By Milwaukee | KTM | 749 | (United Kingdom) Callum Green | 1–4 |
| Hitachi KTM Fuelled By Milwaukee | KTM | 766 | (Austria) Michael Sandner | 7 |
| Hawk Racing Suzuki | Suzuki | 99 | (United Kingdom) Howard Wainwright | 1–5 |
| Lings Castrol Honda UK | Honda | 103 | (United Kingdom) Max Broadbelt | 1–2 |
| MSR Redline Yamaha | Yamaha | 111 | (Iceland) Eythor Reynisson | 3–4 |
| MSR Redline Yamaha | Yamaha | 180 | (United Kingdom) Josh Spinks | 1 |
| Craigs Motorcycles | KTM | 115 | (United Kingdom) Ashton Dickinson | All |
| | KTM | 131 | (United Kingdom) Henry Siddiqui | 5 |
| RSR Plant Services | KTM | 122 | (Republic of Ireland) Jake Sheridan | 1, 3–6, 8 |
| Putoline Husqvarna Planet Suspension Racing | Husqvarna | 123 | (United Kingdom) Rossi Beard | 1–2, 5, 8 |
| Verde Substance KTM | KTM | 134 | (United Kingdom) Liam Knight | 1–3, 5–8 |
| DirtWheelz UK | Kawasaki | 166 | (United Kingdom) Josh Taylor | 8 |
| RFX TEC 41 KTM | KTM | 212 | (United Kingdom) Ben Clark | 1–4 |
| Cab Screens Deos Group Racing | Husqvarna | 261 | (Estonia) Jörgen-Mattias Talviku | 8 |
| Unique Fitout Husqvarna | Husqvarna | 337 | (United Kingdom) Glen McCormick | All |
| RHR Racing | Yamaha | 575 | (United Kingdom) Taylor Hammal | 1–6, 8 |
| Pol Motor Husqvarna | Husqvarna | 651 | (Canada) Kade Tinkler-Walker | 5 |

=== Riders Championship ===
| Pos | Rider | Bike | FAT (England) | | LYN (England) | | CAN (England) | | BLA (England) | | DES (Northern Ireland) | | HAW (England) | | FOX (England) | | LAN (England) | | Points |
|---|---|---|---|---|---|---|---|---|---|---|---|---|---|---|---|---|---|---|---|
| 1 | (New Zealand) Walsh | Husqvarna | 5 | 4 | 7 | 2 | 4 | 2 | 2 | 3 | 5 | 1 | 1 | 1 | 1 | 1 | 1 | 1 | 343 |
| 2 | (Sweden) Östlund | Husqvarna | 3 | 3 | 3 | 6 | 2 | 1 | Ret | 2 | 2 | 3 | 2 | 2 | 2 | 2 | 2 | 6 | 312 |
| 3 | (United Kingdom) Gilbert | Honda | 7 | 5 | 2 | 4 | 3 | 4 | 1 | 4 | 4 | Ret | 3 | 3 | 3 | 4 | 6 | 2 | 284 |
| 4 | (United Kingdom) Barr | Yamaha | 4 | 6 | 5 | 6 | 5 | 3 | 3 | Ret | 3 | 4 | 4 | 4 | 4 | 3 | 5 | Ret | 248 |
| 5 | (United Kingdom) Dickinson | KTM | 6 | 17 | 6 | 7 | 13 | 11 | 5 | 5 | 16 | 7 | 6 | 5 | 6 | 17 | 8 | 11 | 190 |
| 6 | (Netherlands) Vaessen | KTM | 2 | 1 | 4 | 3 | 10 | Ret | 20 | 1 | 1 | 2 | | | | | | | 169 |
| 7 | (United Kingdom) Knight | KTM | 9 | 9 | 8 | 9 | 8 | Ret | | | 18 | 8 | 8 | 6 | 14 | 5 | 4 | 5 | 163 |
| 8 | (United Kingdom) Mewse | KTM | 1 | 2 | 1 | 1 | 1 | Ret | | | | | | | | | 3 | 3 | 162 |
| 9 | (United Kingdom) Grimshaw | Yamaha | 17 | 18 | 10 | 20 | 12 | 15 | 7 | 7 | 13 | 12 | 14 | 9 | 7 | 9 | 7 | 10 | 149 |
| 10 | (United Kingdom) Ellis | KTM | Ret | DSQ | 13 | 11 | 9 | 6 | 9 | 6 | Ret | Ret | 9 | 7 | 9 | 6 | 11 | 12 | 144 |
| 11 | (United Kingdom) Hammal | Yamaha | 14 | 12 | 17 | Ret | 6 | 7 | 4 | Ret | 8 | 5 | 5 | 18 | | | 10 | 7 | 140 |
| 12 | (United Kingdom) McCormick | Husqvarna | 16 | 16 | Ret | 10 | 15 | 9 | 8 | 11 | 6 | 11 | 11 | 14 | 12 | 8 | 16 | 13 | 139 |
| 13 | (United Kingdom) Neal | Husqvarna | 23 | 13 | 9 | 12 | Ret | 12 | Ret | 17 | 10 | 18 | 7 | 8 | 10 | 11 | 14 | 14 | 118 |
| 14 | (United Kingdom) Franklin | Husqvarna | 8 | 11 | 27 | 16 | 14 | 17 | 13 | 9 | 15 | 15 | 15 | 11 | 11 | 12 | | | 106 |
| 15 | (United Kingdom) Yates | Yamaha | 26 | 15 | 20 | 19 | 11 | 14 | 6 | 16 | 17 | 17 | 19 | 19 | 8 | 10 | 15 | 8 | 101 |
| 16 | (Republic of Ireland) Sheridan | KTM | 20 | 19 | | | 17 | 10 | 17 | 12 | 9 | 9 | 13 | 10 | | | 17 | 16 | 83 |
| 17 | (United Kingdom) Hall | Kawasaki | 25 | Ret | 11 | Ret | 19 | 8 | Ret | 20 | 19 | 13 | 10 | Ret | 13 | 15 | 12 | 9 | 82 |
| 18 | (United Kingdom) Brown | KTM | 12 | 7 | 15 | 8 | 7 | 5 | | | | | | | | | | | 72 |
| 19 | (United Kingdom) Mitchell | KTM | 11 | Ret | 18 | 14 | 23 | 18 | 11 | 8 | | | | | Ret | DNS | 18 | 18 | 52 |
| 20 | (United Kingdom) Nunn | Yamaha | | | | | | | 12 | 15 | 14 | 19 | 16 | 12 | 15 | 14 | | | 51 |
| 21 | (United Kingdom) Burrows | Husqvarna | Ret | 23 | 14 | 15 | 18 | Ret | | | | | 17 | Ret | 16 | 16 | 20 | 17 | 35 |
| 22 | (United Kingdom) Hague | Husqvarna | 13 | 21 | | | | | | | 12 | Ret | 12 | 15 | 18 | Ret | | | 35 |
| 23 | (United Kingdom) Clark | KTM | 19 | 14 | 24 | 18 | 20 | 21 | 10 | 14 | | | | | | | | | 31 |
| 24 | (Estonia) Talviku | Husqvarna | | | | | | | | | | | | | | | 9 | 4 | 30 |
| 25 | (Austria) Sandner | KTM | | | | | | | | | | | | | 5 | 7 | | | 30 |
| 26 | (United Kingdom) Husband | Kawasaki | Ret | DNS | 12 | 13 | | | | | | | | | 17 | 13 | | | 29 |
| 27 | (United Kingdom) J. Wainwright | KTM | 10 | 10 | 19 | 17 | | | | | | | | | | | | | 28 |
| 28 | (United Kingdom) Carpenter | Husqvarna | | | | | | | | | 11 | 6 | | | | | | | 25 |
| 29 | (Canada) Tinkler-Walker | Husqvarna | | | | | | | | | 7 | 10 | | | | | | | 25 |
| 30 | (United Kingdom) Beard | Husqvarna | 28 | Ret | 26 | Ret | | | | | 20 | 14 | | | | | 13 | 15 | 22 |
| 31 | (United Kingdom) Collings | KTM | 30 | 24 | | | 22 | 20 | 14 | 19 | 22 | 20 | 18 | 16 | 20 | 19 | | | 22 |
| 32 | (United Kingdom) Hanson | KTM | 24 | Ret | 25 | 22 | 27 | 24 | 16 | 18 | | | 20 | 17 | 19 | 20 | | | 16 |
| 33 | (Iceland) Reynisson | Yamaha | | | | | 25 | 19 | 19 | 10 | | | | | | | | | 15 |
| 34 | (United Kingdom) Cole | Husqvarna | | | 23 | Ret | 26 | 23 | | | | | 21 | 13 | Ret | 18 | 19 | 19 | 15 |
| 35 | (United Kingdom) Putnam | KTM | 22 | Ret | 21 | 21 | 21 | 13 | Ret | DNS | Ret | 16 | 22 | 20 | | | | | 14 |
| 36 | (United Kingdom) H. Wainwright | Suzuki | 18 | Ret | 16 | 23 | Ret | DNS | 15 | Ret | 21 | Ret | | | | | | | 14 |
| 37 | (United Kingdom) Spinks | Yamaha | 29 | 8 | | | | | | | | | | | | | | | 13 |
| 38 | (United Kingdom) Green | KTM | 21 | 22 | 22 | 24 | 24 | 22 | 18 | 13 | | | | | | | | | 11 |
| 39 | (United States) Hastings | Kawasaki | | | | | 16 | 16 | | | | | | | | | | | 10 |
| 40 | (United Kingdom) Hird | Kawasaki | 15 | 20 | Ret | DNS | | | | | | | | | | | | | 6 |
| 41 | (United Kingdom) Ingham | Yamaha | | | | | | | | | | | | | | | Ret | 20 | 1 |
| | (United Kingdom) Siddiqui | KTM | | | | | | | | | Ret | 21 | | | | | | | 0 |
| | (United Kingdom) Bintcliffe | Husqvarna | | | | | | | | | | | Ret | 21 | | | | | 0 |
| | (United Kingdom) Taylor | Kawasaki | | | | | | | | | | | | | | | Ret | 21 | 0 |
| | (United Kingdom) Broadbelt | Honda | 27 | Ret | 28 | 25 | | | | | | | | | | | | | 0 |
| | (United Kingdom) Mackrel | Yamaha | Ret | Ret | | | | | | | | | | | | | | | 0 |
| | (United Kingdom) Ongley | KTM | | | Ret | Ret | | | | | | | | | | | | | 0 |
| Pos | Rider | Bike | FAT (England) | | LYN (England) | | CAN (England) | | BLA (England) | | DES (Northern Ireland) | | HAW (England) | | FOX (England) | | LAN (England) | | Points |
