= 2023 British Motocross Championship =

British Motocross Competition in 2023

The 2023 ACU British Motocross Championship season (known for sponsorship reasons as the Revo MXGB fuelled by Gulf Race Fuels) was the 71st British Motocross Championship season.

Tommy Searle started the season as the reigning champion in the MX1 class after picking up his fourth title in 2022. In the MX2 class, Conrad Mewse was the defending champion after winning his third national title in the previous season. However, Mewse did not defend his title as he moves into the MX1 class for 2023.

In his debut season in the MX1 class, Mewse was able to win the title, taking six race wins and three overall wins along the way. In the MX2 class, Swedish rider Isak Gifting took his first British title.

The second round of the series at Canada Heights, initially scheduled to be held on 2 April 2023, was postponed and later cancelled due to the forecasted weather.

The third round of the series at Foxhill was abandoned after the first race in all classes due to a fatal accident involving photographer Simon Mitchell.

The final round was initially scheduled to be held at Oxford Moto Parc, however, it was later moved to the new Monster Mountain track in Merthyr Tydfil.

== Race calendar and results ==
The full calendar with both dates and venues was released on 16 February 2023.

=== MX1 ===
Round	Date	Location	Race 1 Winner	Race 2 Winner	Round Winner
1	19 March	Oakhanger	(Estonia) Harri Kullas	(Estonia) Harri Kullas	(Estonia) Harri Kullas
2	23 April	Lyng	(Estonia) Harri Kullas	(United Kingdom) Josh Gilbert	(United Kingdom) Josh Gilbert
3	14 May	Foxhill	(Netherlands) Jeffrey Herlings	Race Cancelled	No Overall
4	28 May	Blaxhall	(United Kingdom) Conrad Mewse	(United Kingdom) Conrad Mewse	(United Kingdom) Conrad Mewse
5	18 June	Hawkstone Park	(United Kingdom) Conrad Mewse	(United Kingdom) Conrad Mewse	(United Kingdom) Conrad Mewse
6	2 July	Schoolhouse	(United Kingdom) Conrad Mewse	(United Kingdom) Conrad Mewse	(United Kingdom) Conrad Mewse
7	10 September	Monster Mountain	(Estonia) Harri Kullas	(United Kingdom) Conrad Mewse	(Estonia) Harri Kullas

=== MX2 ===
Round	Date	Location	Race 1 Winner	Race 2 Winner	Round Winner
1	19 March	Oakhanger	(Sweden) Isak Gifting	(Sweden) Isak Gifting	(Sweden) Isak Gifting
2	23 April	Lyng	(Sweden) Isak Gifting	(United States) Jack Chambers	(United States) Jack Chambers
3	14 May	Foxhill	(United Kingdom) Elliott Banks-Browne	Race Cancelled	No Overall
4	28 May	Blaxhall	(Sweden) Isak Gifting	(Sweden) Isak Gifting	(Sweden) Isak Gifting
5	18 June	Hawkstone Park	(United Kingdom) Bobby Bruce	(Sweden) Isak Gifting	(Sweden) Isak Gifting
6	2 July	Schoolhouse	(United Kingdom) Taylor Hammal	(United Kingdom) Elliott Banks-Browne	(United Kingdom) Taylor Hammal
7	10 September	Monster Mountain	(United Kingdom) Tommy Searle	(United Kingdom) Tommy Searle	(United Kingdom) Tommy Searle

=== Circuit locations ===
2023 British Motocross Championship locations

== MX1 ==
=== Participants ===
Team	Constructor	No	Rider	Rounds
ASA United Gas Gas	Gas Gas	2	(United Kingdom) John Adamson	All
ASA United Gas Gas	Gas Gas	128	(Italy) Ivo Monticelli	1, 5–7
Crendon Fastrack Honda Racing	Honda	3	(United Kingdom) Josh Gilbert	All
Crendon Fastrack Honda Racing	Honda	426	(United Kingdom) Conrad Mewse	All
Design Scaffolding ORW	Kawasaki	4	(United Kingdom) Harry Bradley	2–5
Ultimate Wheels Thunder Road Honda	Honda	7	(United Kingdom) Louie Kessell	1–6
Ultimate Wheels Thunder Road Honda	Honda	17	(United Kingdom) Luke Smith	1–4
Ultimate Wheels Thunder Road Honda	Honda	200	(United Kingdom) James Dunn	6
Moto-Cycle Racing	Gas Gas	10	(United Kingdom) Jason Meara	1–2, 5–6
Chambers Racing	Gas Gas	16	(United Kingdom) Tom Grimshaw	All
Chambers Racing	Gas Gas	95	(United Kingdom) Dan Thornhill	1–6
AJP Geartec Racing	Husqvarna	21	(Zimbabwe) Jayden Ashwell	1, 5
Mr Dig Groundworks 91 Moto	Honda	23	(United Kingdom) John Joe Wright	6
Gabriel SS24 KTM Racing Team	KTM	24	(United Kingdom) Shaun Simpson	1–4
Gabriel SS24 KTM Racing Team	KTM	141	(South Africa) Tristan Purdon	All
	Honda	38	(United Kingdom) Gavin Stevenson	5
LAAB Park MX MLM GFX	Honda	40	(United Kingdom) Jamie Fort	6
	Yamaha	41	(United Kingdom) Nathan Green	3
Tru7 Honda Racing Academy	Honda	49	(United Kingdom) Callum Green	All
Apico Husqvarna	Husqvarna	50	(United Kingdom) Martin Barr	1–4, 6–7
SR75	Suzuki	51	(United Kingdom) Ben Harrison	2, 4–5
Danger UK RSS Stafford Vans	Honda	57	(United Kingdom) Tony Craig	5
Holeshot Kawasaki	Kawasaki	62	(United Kingdom) Charlie Way	3
	Kawasaki	68	(United Kingdom) Josh Bentley	1
GMR Magic Mushroom Yamaha	Yamaha	74	(United Kingdom) Tom Murphy	4–7
Red Bull KTM Factory Racing	KTM	84	(Netherlands) Jeffrey Herlings	3
SC Sporthomes Husqvarna	Husqvarna	91	(United Kingdom) Charlie Putnam	All
SC Sporthomes Husqvarna	Husqvarna	147	(Finland) Miro Sihvonen	1–3, 6
SC Sporthomes Husqvarna	Husqvarna	777	(Russia) Evgeny Bobryshev	2–6
SC Sporthomes Husqvarna	Husqvarna	874	(United States) Zack Williams	7
GTCI Revo Kawasaki	Kawasaki	100	(United Kingdom) Tommy Searle	1–3, 5–6
MV Haulage Store 114 Honda	Honda	101	(United Kingdom) Michael Ellis	2–3
Eastwood Racing Suspension	Honda	103	(United Kingdom) Max Broadbelt	4–5
T.A.L.K Templant Racing Team	KTM	115	(United Kingdom) Ashton Dickinson	1–6
NE10 Vodka Dirt Wheelz	Yamaha	118	(United Kingdom) Jaydon Murphy	7
Gabriel KTM	KTM	134	(United Kingdom) Liam Knight	All
Matt Pope Motorcycles	Gas Gas	149	(United Kingdom) Luke Parker	2, 4
Kior/Shaw/Tamworth Yamaha	Yamaha	150	(United Kingdom) Aaron Patstone	3–5
Cabscreens Crescent Yamaha	Yamaha	151	(Estonia) Harri Kullas	All
Cabscreens Crescent Yamaha	Yamaha	184	(United Kingdom) James Carpenter	All
S Briggs Commercials Honda	Honda	162	(Republic of Ireland) Stuart Edmonds	All
Oakleaf Worx Motorsport	Honda	166	(United Kingdom) Josh Taylor	5
Comptons Cars and Commercials	KTM	190	(United Kingdom) Luke Benstead	2, 4–5
Modu Kawasaki Racing Team	Kawasaki	211	(United Kingdom) Billy MacKenzie	1–3, 6
	KTM	246	(Netherlands) Jonah Pijnen	2
Phoenix Tools Evenstrokes Kawasaki	Kawasaki	277	(United Kingdom) Jay Hague	1–4
HertsMX Honda	Honda	301	(United Kingdom) Shaun Southgate	2
Lings Gas Gas	Gas Gas	411	(United Kingdom) Declan Whittle	2–5
PP Sports Southside MX Bickers	Husqvarna	425	(United Kingdom) Drew Anderson	1–4
Grizzly Racing Service	Husqvarna	469	(Netherlands) Ryan de Beer	5
GH Motorcycles	Husqvarna	499	(United Kingdom) Ben Cole	4
Store 114 Racing	Honda	511	(United Kingdom) Steven Clarke	1–5
Trueline/MX Dreams California	KTM	546	(United Kingdom) Max Lewis	1, 3
C-Res Bikesport Newcastle	Honda	714	(United Kingdom) Brad Todd	All

=== Riders Championship ===
Pos	Rider	Bike	OAK (England)		LYN (England)		FOX (England)		BLA (England)		HAW (England)		SCH (England)		MON (Wales)		Points
1	(United Kingdom) Conrad Mewse	Honda	2	2	2	2	3	C	1	1	1	1	1	1	3	1	303
2	(United Kingdom) Josh Gilbert	Honda	5	3	3	1	2	C	2	2	3	2	2	2	2	3	275
3	(Estonia) Harri Kullas	Yamaha	1	1	1	3	5	C	3	3	2	4	4	5	1	2	272
4	(South Africa) Tristan Purdon	KTM	13	12	13	15	6	C	5	6	5	9	7	6	5	8	163
5	(United Kingdom) John Adamson	Gas Gas	Ret	19	4	5	8	C	19	5	6	7	8	8	6	6	152
6	(Russia) Evgeny Bobryshev	Husqvarna			6	4	14	C	4	4	4	3	5	3			150
7	(United Kingdom) James Carpenter	Yamaha	9	13	9	9	24	C	6	10	13	11	9	7	8	7	141
8	(United Kingdom) Brad Todd	Honda	12	8	7	6	11	C	12	12	8	Ret	10	9	7	10	140
9	(United Kingdom) Tom Grimshaw	Gas Gas	7	5	16	Ret	13	C	15	9	14	12	13	11	9	5	123
10	(United Kingdom) Tommy Searle	Kawasaki	4	DNS	5	17	4	C			7	6	6	4			118
11	(United Kingdom) Liam Knight	KTM	14	11	12	16	12	C	8	8	12	Ret	11	10	11	11	116
12	(United Kingdom) Ashton Dickinson	KTM	8	7	18	11	9	C	7	7	9	8	Ret	DNS			105
13	(Italy) Ivo Monticelli	Gas Gas	3	DNS							10	5	3	20	4	4	104
14	(United Kingdom) Martin Barr	Husqvarna	Ret	6	8	7	15	C	10	14			15	14	12	14	95
15	(United Kingdom) Shaun Simpson	KTM	6	4	11	8	7	C	DNS	DNS							70
16	(Republic of Ireland) Stuart Edmonds	Honda	Ret	9	14	13	Ret	C	11	13	17	14	19	13	17	DNS	70
17	(United Kingdom) Jason Meara	Gas Gas	10	20	15	12					11	10	16	17			57
18	(United Kingdom) Dan Thornhill	Gas Gas	15	18	19	21	16	C	18	11	21	13	14	15			50
19	(Finland) Miro Sihvonen	Husqvarna	17	10	17	10	Ret	C					12	12			48
20	(United Kingdom) Callum Green	Honda	18	16	26	20	23	C	22	18	19	Ret	18	19	13	12	36
21	(United Kingdom) Steven Clarke	Honda	Ret	DNS	21	14	10	C	9	Ret	16	20					36
22	(United Kingdom) Charlie Putnam	Husqvarna	16	17	27	22	21	C	20	17	18	17	17	Ret	15	DNS	31
23	(United Kingdom) Luke Parker	Gas Gas			10	18			13	16							27
24	(United Kingdom) Jay Hague	Kawasaki	11	15	20	Ret	19	C	16	19							26
25	(Netherlands) Jeffrey Herlings	KTM					1	C									25
26	(United States) Zack Williams	Husqvarna													10	9	23
27	(United Kingdom) Tom Murphy	Yamaha							Ret	23	28	24	24	21	14	13	15
28	(United Kingdom) Billy MacKenzie	Kawasaki	22	14	23	Ret	17	C					20	18			15
29	(United Kingdom) Luke Benstead	KTM			24	23			14	15	23	16					18
30	(United Kingdom) Tony Craig	Honda									15	15					12
31	(United Kingdom) Declan Whittle	Gas Gas			22	19	20	C	17	Ret	26	23					7
32	(United Kingdom) Jaydon Murphy	Yamaha													16	DNS	5
33	(United Kingdom) James Dunn	Honda											21	16			5
34	(United Kingdom) Gavin Stevenson	Honda									20	18					4
35	(United Kingdom) Michael Ellis	Honda			25	24	18	C									3
36	(Zimbabwe) Jayden Ashwell	Husqvarna	21	21							22	19					2
37	(United Kingdom) Josh Bentley	Kawasaki	19	Ret													2
38	(United Kingdom) Max Broadbelt	Honda							21	20	25	21					1
39	(United Kingdom) Louie Kessell	Honda	20	23	30	27	22	C	24	21	24	22	22	DNS			1
	(United Kingdom) Harry Bradley	Kawasaki			29	26	25	C	23	22	Ret	DNS					0
	(United Kingdom) Luke Smith	Honda	23	22	32	28	29	C	29	25							0
	(United Kingdom) John Joe Wright	Honda											23	Ret			0
	(United Kingdom) Ben Cole	Husqvarna							25	24							0
	(United Kingdom) Drew Anderson	Husqvarna	Ret	DNS	28	25	26	C	26	Ret							0
	(United Kingdom) Josh Taylor	Honda									27	25					0
	(United Kingdom) Aaron Patstone	Yamaha					30	C	28	Ret	29	26					0
	(United Kingdom) Ben Harrison	Suzuki			31	29			27	Ret	31	28					0
	(Netherlands) Ryan de Beer	Husqvarna									30	27					0
	(United Kingdom) Max Lewis	KTM	Ret	DNS			27	C									0
	(United Kingdom) Nathan Green	Yamaha					28	C									0
	(Netherlands) Jonah Pijnen	KTM			Ret	Ret											0
	(United Kingdom) Shaun Southgate	Honda			Ret	Ret											0
	(United Kingdom) Charlie Way	Kawasaki					Ret	C									0
	(United Kingdom) Jamie Fort	Honda											Ret	DNS			0
Pos	Rider	Bike	OAK (England)		LYN (England)		FOX (England)		BLA (England)		HAW (England)		SCH (England)		MON (Wales)		Points

== MX2 ==
=== Participants ===
Team	Constructor	No	Rider	Rounds
	Husqvarna	5	(United Kingdom) Mitch Armour	6
Phoenix Evenstrokes Kawasaki	Kawasaki	6	(United Kingdom) Carlton Husband	All
Phoenix Evenstrokes Kawasaki	Kawasaki	127	(United Kingdom) Sam Atkinson	1
Ultimate Wheels Thunder Road Honda	Honda	7	(United Kingdom) Louie Kessell	7
GTCI Revo Kawasaki	Kawasaki	9	(United Kingdom) Mel Pocock	3–6
GTCI Revo Kawasaki	Kawasaki	53	(New Zealand) Dylan Walsh	1
GTCI Revo Kawasaki	Kawasaki	100	(United Kingdom) Tommy Searle	7
GTCI Revo Kawasaki	Kawasaki	441	(United Kingdom) Billy Askew	7
Meredith MX	Fantic	9	(United Kingdom) Lewis Hall	3
Chambers Racing	Gas Gas	10	(United Kingdom) Harvey Cashmore	1–6
Chambers Racing	Gas Gas	300	(United Kingdom) Ben Franklin	1–5, 7
Chambers Racing	Gas Gas	337	(United Kingdom) Glenn McCormick	1–4, 7
Chambers Racing	Husqvarna	731	(United Kingdom) Alfie Jones	1–2, 7
Croft Garage/Goggle Tek	Yamaha	11	(United Kingdom) Robert Holyoake	1–6
Big Van World MTX Kawasaki	Kawasaki	12	(United States) Jack Chambers	2–3, 7
Southside MX	KTM	20	(United Kingdom) William Farrow	1–2, 4–5
Stan Civils Groundworks	Gas Gas	22	(United Kingdom) Travis Steels	2–3
Gabriel SS24 KTM	KTM	23	(United Kingdom) Taylor Hammal	All
Gabriel SS24 KTM	KTM	411	(United Kingdom) Shaun Mahoney	All
Offroad Network UK Holeshot MX	KTM	24	(United Kingdom) Liam Garland	7
426 Motorsport	KTM	28	(United Kingdom) Charlie Griffiths	1–6
DMH Vantage	Husqvarna	38	(United Kingdom) Daniel Hutchinson	6
WPH/SBE/Pure/Redline KTM	KTM	40	(United Kingdom) Jamie Wainwright	All
Geartec	Husqvarna	44	(United Kingdom) Elliott Banks-Browne	All
DS Lausnir	Yamaha	49	(Iceland) Eiður Orri Pálmarsson	1, 4–5
M Smith	KTM	53	(New Zealand) Dylan Walsh	7
Algas Medical	KTM	57	(United Kingdom) Kyle McNicol	1–4, 6
Team Ando	Honda	60	(United Kingdom) Brad Anderson	6
PSU Designs Ltd	KTM	63	(United Kingdom) Dan Arkell	1
	Yamaha	66	(United Kingdom) Lewis Tombs	2
Foxwood Trade AU7	KTM	71	(United Kingdom) James Cottrell	2, 4
723 Race Bikes	Fantic	72	(United Kingdom) Raife Broadley	3
GMR Magic Mushroom Yamaha	Yamaha	74	(United Kingdom) Tom Murphy	1–2
723 Racebikes Westsole Fencing	Gas Gas	75	(United Kingdom) Aaron Ongley	1–4
Blade Bikes	Kawasaki	82	(United Kingdom) Charlie Cole	1–5
Wulfsport/MarshMX	Honda	99	(United Kingdom) Howard Wainwright	1, 3
Armor Vision	Gas Gas	101	(United Kingdom) Tyla Hooley	7
Verde Shiloh KTM	KTM	119	(United Kingdom) Bailey Johnston	1–6
Verde Shiloh KTM	KTM	260	(United Kingdom) Dylan Woodcock	7
Verde Shiloh KTM	KTM	303	(United Kingdom) Jake Millward	1–4
RSR Plant Services KTM	KTM	122	(Republic of Ireland) Jake Sheridan	1–4
Apico Husqvarna	Husqvarna	131	(United Kingdom) Henry Siddiqui	1–3
Apico Husqvarna	Husqvarna	433	(United Kingdom) Jack Lindsay	1
TEG Sport	Fantic	157	(United Kingdom) James Dent	6
ASA United Gas Gas	Gas Gas	163	(United Kingdom) Ben Mustoe	All
ASA United Gas Gas	Gas Gas	579	(United Kingdom) Bobby Bruce	1–5
Oakleaf Worx Motorsport	Honda	166	(United Kingdom) Josh Taylor	1–4
JSMX Coaching	KTM	180	(United Kingdom) Josh Spinks	3
	Yamaha	241	(United Kingdom) Nathan Claughan	6
SC Sporthomes Husqvarna	Husqvarna	261	(Estonia) Jörgen-Matthias Talviku	1, 5–7
Armor Vision RJP	Yamaha	272	(South Africa) Neville Bradshaw	5
Cabscreens Crescent Yamaha	Yamaha	365	(United Kingdom) Sam Nunn	All
	KTM	410	(United Kingdom) James Barker	1–6
GRT Impact KTM	KTM	419	(United Kingdom) Joe Brookes	1, 3–7
Tru7 Honda Racing Academy	Honda	422	(United Kingdom) Charlie Heyman	All
DP Brakes/Tallon/Joov	Husqvarna	470	(United Kingdom) Tom Hughes	1–3, 7
Team PP Sports powered by Southside	KTM	500	(United Kingdom) Callum Murfitt	All
Stebbings Car Superstore powered by Bikesure 426 Motorsport	Gas Gas	517	(Sweden) Isak Gifting	All
T.A.L.K Templant Racing Team	KTM	616	(United Kingdom) Ollie Colmer	1, 5–6
Holeshote Motocross KTM	KTM	661	(United Kingdom) Josh Coleman	3, 7
Southside Motocross	Honda	687	(United Kingdom) Jake Rackham	1, 4
Jim Aim Racing	KTM	712	(United Kingdom) Josh Peters	4–6
AJP Gas Gas	Husqvarna	719	(United Kingdom) James Margetson	1–2, 5
MV Haulage	KTM	771	(United Kingdom) Ollie Beamish	3, 6
	Yamaha	807	(United Kingdom) Luca Pegg	4
DK Offroad	Gas Gas	912	(United Kingdom) Joel Rizzi	4–7

=== Riders Championship ===
Pos	Rider	Bike	OAK (England)		LYN (England)		FOX (England)		BLA (England)		HAW (England)		SCH (England)		MON (Wales)		Points
1	(Sweden) Isak Gifting	Gas Gas	1	1	1	2	4	C	1	1	2	1	6	11	15	2	265
2	(United Kingdom) Taylor Hammal	KTM	4	6	3	12	3	C	11	2	5	3	1	3	9	5	223
3	(United Kingdom) Elliott Banks-Browne	Husqvarna	6	11	5	5	1	C	3	3	3	4	Ret	1	2	7	221
4	(United Kingdom) Bobby Bruce	Gas Gas	3	2	4	3	17	C	2	4	1	2					171
5	(United Kingdom) Jamie Wainwright	KTM	7	5	11	11	16	C	6	7	14	7	10	8	12	10	149
6	(United Kingdom) Carlton Husband	Kawasaki	10	9	9	Ret	14	C	8	11	8	6	2	5	10	15	148
7	(United Kingdom) Charlie Heyman	Honda	18	13	21	4	13	C	9	8	7	9	7	7	20	8	130
8	(United Kingdom) Sam Nunn	Yamaha	12	10	6	9	10	C	Ret	DNS	9	8	13	15	4	9	127
9	(Estonia) Jörgen-Matthias Talviku	Husqvarna	2	8							6	5	4	2	13	Ret	114
10	(United Kingdom) Charlie Cole	Kawasaki	29	7	7	6	2	C	4	5	12	Ret					108
11	(United Kingdom) Ben Mustoe	Gas Gas	11	33	10	17	11	C	13	14	18	15	11	10	6	13	103
12	(United Kingdom) Joel Rizzi	Gas Gas							5	6	13	11	5	6	14	6	102
13	(United States) Jack Chambers	Kawasaki			2	1	5	C							7	3	97
14	(United Kingdom) Mel Pocock	Kawasaki					6	C	7	DNS	4	10	3	4			96
15	(United Kingdom) Glenn McCormick	Gas Gas	15	12	12	7	9	C	10	10					8	14	92
16	(United Kingdom) Jake Millward	KTM	5	3	8	8	8	C	Ret	DNS							75
17	(United Kingdom) Ben Franklin	Gas Gas	13	14	13	13	15	C	12	9	10	Ret			19	18	74
18	(United Kingdom) Bailey Johnston	KTM	14	15	Ret	DNS	22	C	14	12	11	13	14	14			61
19	(United Kingdom) Joe Brookes	KTM	16	19			Ret	C	19	15	16	12	8	9	16	Ret	59
20	(United Kingdom) Tommy Searle	Kawasaki													1	1	50
21	(United Kingdom) James Barker	KTM	26	21	14	16	24	C	17	13	15	Ret	12	18			42
22	(United Kingdom) Alfie Jones	Husqvarna	8	4	Ret	DNS									11	Ret	41
23	(New Zealand) Dylan Walsh	Kawasaki	Ret	DNS													38
23	(New Zealand) Dylan Walsh	KTM													3	4	38
24	(United Kingdom) Kyle McNicol	KTM	32	29	20	15	26	C	16	Ret			18	13			23
25	(United Kingdom) Brad Anderson	Honda											9	12			21
26	(United Kingdom) Josh Peters	KTM							Ret	16	17	20	15	16			21
27	(United Kingdom) Ollie Colmer	KTM	9	DNS							Ret	14	24	Ret			19
28	(United Kingdom) Robert Holyoake	Yamaha	17	16	Ret	DNS	Ret	C	15	Ret	21	18	Ret	DNS			18
29	(United Kingdom) Billy Askew	Kawasaki													5	Ret	16
30	(United Kingdom) Josh Spinks	KTM					7	C									14
31	(United Kingdom) Shaun Mahoney	KTM	19	27	25	27	27	C	Ret	26	19	17	17	19	Ret	DNS	14
32	(United Kingdom) Lewis Tombs	Yamaha			19	10											13
33	(United Kingdom) James Margetson	Husqvarna	30	17	26	18					Ret	16					12
34	(United Kingdom) Aaron Ongley	Gas Gas	24	22	15	19	21	C	20	19							11
35	(Republic of Ireland) Jake Sheridan	KTM	Ret	20	18	14	Ret	C	Ret	DNS							11
36	(United Kingdom) Dylan Woodcock	KTM													Ret	11	10
37	(United Kingdom) Josh Coleman	KTM					20	C							17	16	10
38	(United Kingdom) Tyla Hooley	Gas Gas													21	12	9
39	(United Kingdom) Howard Wainwright	Honda	21	Ret			12	C									9
40	(United Kingdom) Daniel Hutchinson	Husqvarna											19	17			6
41	(United Kingdom) Callum Murfitt	KTM	34	23	17	22	28	C	26	23	23	21	22	DNS	23	19	6
42	(United Kingdom) Josh Taylor	Honda	25	25	23	DNS	18	C	18	25							6
43	(United Kingdom) Ollie Beamish	KTM					23	C					16	24			5
44	(United Kingdom) James Cottrell	KTM			16	21			Ret	Ret							5
45	(United Kingdom) Louie Kessell	Honda													22	17	4
46	(United Kingdom) Jake Rackham	Honda	22	30					23	17							4
47	(United Kingdom) Sam Aktinson	Kawasaki	Ret	18													3
48	(United Kingdom) Charlie Griffiths	KTM	27	28	27	23	29	C	27	20	25	19	21	21			3
49	(United Kingdom) Liam Garland	KTM													18	Ret	3
50	(United Kingdom) William Farrow	KTM	33	24	22	24			21	18	24	23					3
51	(United Kingdom) Lewis Hall	Fantic					19	C									2
52	(United Kingdom) James Dent	Fantic											20	20			2
53	(United Kingdom) Tom Hughes	Husqvarna	Ret	32	28	26	Ret	C							24	20	1
54	(South Africa) Neville Bradshaw	Yamaha									20	Ret					1
55	(United Kingdom) Travis Steels	Gas Gas			Ret	20	31	C									1
56	(United Kingdom) Tom Murphy	Yamaha	20	Ret	Ret	DNS											1
	(United Kingdom) Harvey Cashmore	Gas Gas	28	26	24	25	30	C	25	21	DSQ	22	Ret	23			0
	(Iceland) Eiður Orri Pálmarsson	Yamaha	23	31					24	22	22	Ret					0
	(United Kingdom) Mitch Armour	Husqvarna											23	22			0
	(United Kingdom) Luca Pegg	Yamaha							22	24							0
	(United Kingdom) Raife Broadley	Fantic					25	C									0
	(United Kingdom) Henry Siddiqui	Husqvarna	31	Ret	Ret	DNS	Ret	C									0
	(United Kingdom) Dan Arkell	KTM	Ret	34													0
	(United Kingdom) Nathan Claughan	Yamaha											Ret	Ret			0
	(United Kingdom) Jack Lindsay	Husqvarna	DNS	DNS													0
Pos	Rider	Bike	OAK (England)		LYN (England)		FOX (England)		BLA (England)		HAW (England)		SCH (England)		MON (Wales)		Points
