= Blaxhall =

Village in Suffolk, England

Coordinates: 52°09′40″N 1°27′41″E

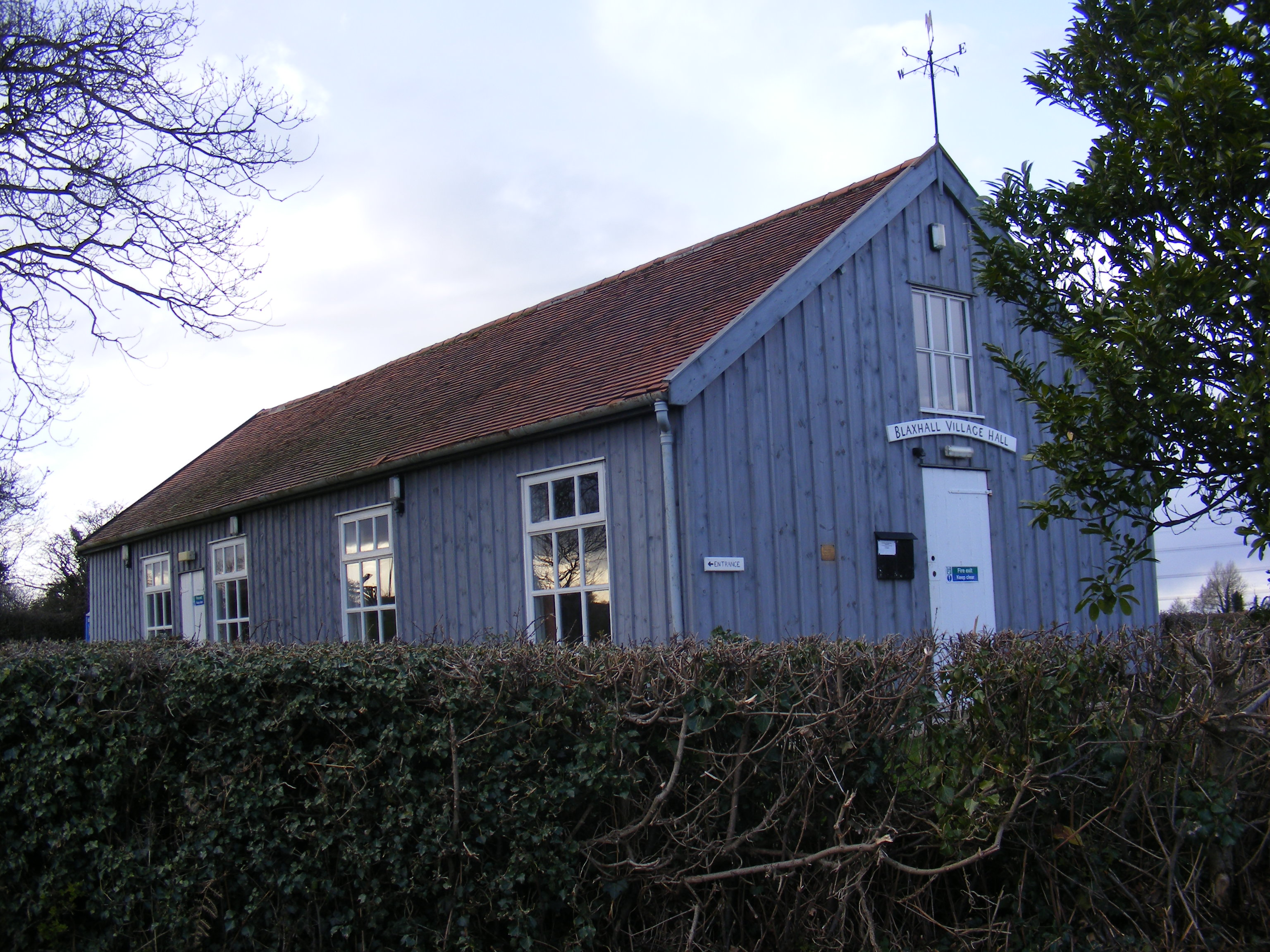
- Blaxhall Village Hall

- Location within Suffolk
- Interactive map of Blaxhall
- Population: 194 (2011)
- District: East Suffolk
- Shire county: Suffolk
- Region: East
- Country: England
- Sovereign state: United Kingdom
- Post town: Woodbridge
- Postcode district: IP12

Blaxhall is a village and civil parish in the East Suffolk district of the English county of Suffolk. Located around 8 miles (13 km) south-west of Leiston and Aldeburgh, in 2007 its population was estimated to be 220, measured at 194 in the 2011 Census.

The parish council owns Blaxhall Common, a Site of Special Scientific Interest located on the Suffolk Coast and Heaths Area of Outstanding Natural Beauty to the south-east of the village. The area is one of the few remaining areas of lowland dry heathland in the Suffolk Sandlings and is managed by Suffolk Wildlife Trust as a nature reserve.

The Blaxhall Stone is a large stone located at Stone Farm which, according to local legend, has been constantly increasing in size since it was dug up in the 19th century.

Blaxhall is the subject of the book Ask the Fellows who Cut the Hay by the historian George Ewart Evans. It describes rural life in the village.

== Notable people from Blaxhall ==
- Thomas Weyland (~1230–1298), lawyer, administrator and landowner who became Chief Justice of the Common Pleas under King Edward I.
- John Arnold (?-~1410), Member of Parliament for Ipswich in September 1388, 1394, January 1397, and 1399. Also Coroner and Bailiff of the town and an Alnager.
- Robert Curson (1460–1535), courtier at the court of Henry VIII, and also that of Holy Roman Emperor Maximilian I.
- William Bullein (c.1515–1576), physician and cleric.
- Margery Beddingfield (1742–1763), convicted murderer who was burnt in 1763.
- George Ewart Evans (1909–1988), Welsh-born schoolteacher, writer and folklorist.
