= 2023 Dakar Rally =

Off-road motorsport event in Saudi Arabia

Part of the Dakar Rally
← Previous event	Next event →
- Host country: Saudi Arabia
- Dates run: 31 December 2022–15 January 2023
- Start: near Yanbu
- Finish: Dammam
- Stages: 14
- Stage surface: Sand, rocks, gravel, tarmac

Results
- Cars winner: (Qatar) Nasser Al-Attiyah (France) Mathieu Baumel; Toyota Gazoo Racing
- Bikes winner: (Argentina) Kevin Benavides; Red Bull KTM Factory Team
- Quads winner: (France) Alexandre Giroud; Yamaha Racing - SMX - Drag'On
- Light Prototypes winner: (United States) Austin Jones (Brazil) Gustavo Gugelmin; Red Bull Off-Road Junior Team USA By BFG
- SSVs winner: (Poland) Eryk Goczał (Spain) Oriol Mena; Energylandia Rally Team
- Trucks winner: (Netherlands) Janus van Kasteren (Poland) Darek Rodewald (Netherlands) Marcel Snijders; Boss Machinery Team De Rooy Iveco
- Classics winner: (Spain) Juan Morera (Spain) Lidia Ruba; Toyota Classic

The 2023 Dakar Rally was a rally raid event held in Saudi Arabia and the 45th edition of the Dakar Rally organized by Amaury Sport Organisation (ASO). The event takes place between 31 December 2022 and 15 January 2023. This is the fourth time Saudi Arabia has hosted the event. For the second year running, the event is also the first round of the 2023 World Rally-Raid Championship.

The outline of the race route was presented on 5 June 2022. The route was started at a "Sea Camp" near Yanbu, on the Red Sea shore, and finished in Dammam, at the Persian Gulf shore. The route returned to the Empty Quarter this year with three stages, including the marathon stage. The route featured 70% new tracks, less liaison, and 5,000 kilometres of special stages. The route, details of which were revealed in November, has been described as longer, more difficult and with more dunes.

== Timeline ==
- 6 June – 31 October 2022: Registrations
- 28–30 November 2022: Administrative checks at Circuit Paul Ricard
- 27–28 December 2022: Arrivals at Saudi Arabia
- 31 December 2022: Starting podium and the Prologue Stage
- 1 January 2023: Race start
- 15 January 2023: Race finish

== Changes ==
Some changes were announced for this year's event:

- Digital roadbooks for all participants, including the bikes
- Time bonuses for bikes opening the stage
- "Mirror routes" - in order to separate the routes some stages will be split into "A and B routes", which feature different waypoints, assigned randomly
- No neutralizations for T1 and T2 categories - the stage will not have breaks in the middle
- Stage start procedure - the first truck to leave will be from 45th place. No reclassification for top 40 drivers
- Dakar Classic will follow dedicated route with 13 stages, including 2 marathon. New average speed group for less powerful vehicles
- Introduction of "synthetic and bio fuels", with expectation that elite drivers will compete in low emission prototypes by 2026

== Entry list ==
On 10 November 2022 ASO announced the list of competitors.

In the truck category, the Kamaz and MAZ factory teams - two of the most dominant teams in the category - elected not to enter the 2023 Dakar Rally due to complaints that the FIA would force them to condemn the Russian invasion of Ukraine to enter. The two teams are based in Russia and Belarus, respectively.

=== Number of entries ===
Stage	Bikes	Quads	Cars	SxS–T3	UTV–T4	Trucks	Total	Classic Cars	Classic Trucks	Total Dakar Classic
Entry list (Note: As of 26 November, before scrutineering)	142	19	74	45	48	55	383	75	14	89
At start line	139	18	67	47	45	54	370	75	13	88
Rest day (Note: At start line after the rest day)	93	12	59	42	43	51	300	71	12	83
Finished (Note: To rank in the final standings, the vehicle had to pass through the finishing podium.) (Note: There was no Dakar Experience category this year. As the Dakar Rally became a FIA event, the vehicles that failed to finish a stage could still continue at the next, having taken a time penalty.)	80	10	45	39	38	21	233	68	12	80

=== Vehicles and Categories ===
Vehicles and Categories

Category	Bikes		Quads		Cars		SxS–T3		UTVs–T4		Trucks		Classic Cars		Classic Trucks	
	Class	Description	Class	Description	Class	Description	Class	Description	Class	Description	Class	Description	Class	Description	Class	Description
	RallyGP	A.S.O. "Elite"			T1.U	T1 electric/hybrid 4x4 modified	T3	Light Prototypes	T4	Production SSVs turbo	Truck>10,000cc	Production Trucks	-86 Low Average	TBC	-86 Low Average	TBC
	Rally2	"Non-Elite" Super-Production			T1+	T1 upgraded 4x4 modified							-86 Intermediate Average	TBC	-86 Moderate Average	TBC
					T1.1	T1 prototypes 4x4 modified							-86 Moderate Average	TBC	87-96 Low Average	TBC
					T1.2	T1 prototypes 2WD modified							87-96 Low Average	TBC	87-96 Moderate Average	TBC
					T2	T2 Production							87-96 Intermediate Average	TBC	+97 Moderate Average	TBC
													87-96 Moderate Average	TBC		
													87-96 High Average	TBC		
													+97 Intermediate Average	TBC		
													+97 Moderate Average	TBC		
													+97 High Average	TBC		

=== Competitor list ===
Entry list — Bikes

Note
– The "Dakar Legends" - competitors that participated in 10 or more Dakar events.
– The first time starters - "rookies".
– Competitors that were not able to start the race.
– Competitors participating in "Original by Motul" — limited assistance marathon class.

No.	Driver	Bike	Team	Class
1	(United Kingdom) Sam Sunderland	Gas Gas 450 Rally Factory Replica	Red Bull GasGas Factory Racing	RallyGP
2	(United States) Ricky Brabec	Honda CRF450 Rally	Monster Energy Honda Team	RallyGP
5	(Spain) Joan Barreda	Honda CRF450 Rally	Monster Energy JB Team	RallyGP
7	(Chile) Pablo Quintanilla	Honda CRF450 Rally	Monster Energy Honda Team	RallyGP
8	(Australia) Toby Price	KTM 450 Rally Factory Replica	Red Bull KTM Factory Team	RallyGP
9	(United States) Mason Klein	KTM 450 Rally Replica	BAS Dakar KTM Racing Team	RallyGP
10	(United States) Skyler Howes	Husqvarna 450 Rally Factory Replica	Husqvarna Factory Racing	RallyGP
11	(Chile) José Ignacio Cornejo	Honda CRF450 Rally	Monster Energy Honda Team	RallyGP
12	(Czech Republic) Martin Michek	KTM 450 Rally Replica	Orion - Moto Racing Group	RallyGP
14	(Germany) Sebastian Bühler	Hero 450 Rally	Hero Motosports Team Rally	RallyGP
15	(Spain) Lorenzo Santolino	Sherco 450 SEF Rally	Sherco TVS Rally Factory	RallyGP
16	(Botswana) Ross Branch	Hero 450 Rally	Hero Motosports Team Rally	RallyGP
17	(France) Romain Dumontier	Husqvarna 450 Rally	Team Dumontier Racing	Rally2
18	(Australia) Daniel Sanders	Gas Gas 450 Rally Factory Replica	Red Bull GasGas Factory Racing	RallyGP
19	(Portugal) Rui Gonçalves	Sherco 450 SEF Rally	Sherco TVS Rally Factory	RallyGP
20	(India) Harith Noah Koitha Veettil	Sherco 450 SEF Rally	Sherco TVS Rally Factory	RallyGP
21	(South Africa) Bradley Cox	KTM 450 Rally Factory Replica	BAS Dakar KTM Racing Team	Rally2
24	(Czech Republic) Jan Brabec	KTM 450 Rally Factory Replica	Strojrent Racing	Rally2
25	(United Arab Emirates) Mohammed Balooshi	Husqvarna FR 450 Rally	MX Ride Dubai	RallyGP
26	(France) Camille Chapeliere	Husqvarna 450 Rally	Team Casteu	Rally2
27	(Portugal) Joaquim Rodrigues	Hero 450 Rally	Hero Motosports Team Rally	RallyGP
28	(Poland) Maciej Giemza	Husqvarna FR 450 Rally	Orlen Team	RallyGP
29	(Argentina) Diego Gamaliel Llanos	KTM 450 Rally Factory Replica	Xraids Experience	Rally2
30	(Portugal) Antonio Maio	Yamaha WR450F Rally	Franco Sport Yamaha Racing Team	RallyGP
31	(France) Mathieu Doveze	KTM 450 Rally Factory Replica	Nomade Racing	Rally2
32	(Czech Republic) Milan Engel	KTM 450 Rally Factory Replica	Orion-Moto Racing Group	Rally2
33	(Argentina) Franco Caimi	Hero 450 Rally	Hero Motosports Team Rally	RallyGP
34	(Romania) Emanuel Gyenes	KTM 450 Rally Factory Replica	Autonet Motorcycle Team	Rally2
35	(Chile) Patricio Cabrera	KTM 450 Rally	Rieju Team	Rally2
36	(Belgium) Jérôme Martiny	Husqvarna 450 Rally	Team Dumontier Racing	Rally2
37	(Argentina) Stefano Caimi	KTM 450 Rally Factory Replica	BAS World KTM Racing Team	Rally2
38	(Spain) Eduardo Iglesias Sánchez	KTM 450 Rally Factory Replica	Joyride Race Service	Rally2
39	(France) Benjamin Melot	KTM 450 Rally Factory Replica	Team Esprit KTM	Rally2
40	(South Africa) Charan Moore	Husqvarna 450 Rally	LVLS Rally	Rally2
41	(Chile) Tomás De Gavardo	KTM 450 Rally	BAS World KTM Racing Team	Rally2
42	(France) Adrien Van Beveren	Honda CRF450 Rally	Monster Energy Honda Team	RallyGP
43	(Portugal) Mario Patrão	KTM 450 Rally Factory Replica	Crédit Agricola - Mario Patrão Motorsport	Rally2
44	(Netherlands) Mirjam Pol	Husqvarna 450 Rally	HT Rally Raid Husqvarna Racing	Rally2
45	(Czech Republic) David Pabiška	KTM 450 Rally Factory Replica	SP Moto Bohemia Racing Team	Rally2
46	(Italy) Paolo Lucci	KTM 450 Rally Factory Replica	BAS World KTM Racing Team	Rally2
47	(Argentina) Kevin Benavides	KTM 450 Rally Factory Replica	Red Bull KTM Factory Team	RallyGP
48	(Spain) Juan Pedrero García	KTM 450 Rally Factory Replica	Rieju Team	Rally2
49	(Italy) Cesare Zacchetti	KTM 450 Rally Factory Replica	Team Lucky Explorer	Rally2
50	(Slovenia) Simon Marčič	Husqvarna FE Rally Replica	Marčič	Rally2
51	(Spain) Rachid Al-Lal Lahadil	Husqvarna 450 Rally Replica	Melilla Sport Capital	Rally2
52	(Austria) Matthias Walkner	KTM 450 Rally Factory Replica	Red Bull KTM Factory Team	RallyGP
53	(Slovenia) Toni Mulec	Husqvarna 450 Rally	HT Rally Raid Husqvarna Racing	Rally2
54	(Bolivia) Daniel Nosiglia Jager	KTM 450 Rally Factory Replica	Rieju - Xraidsexperience	RallyGP
55	(China) Zaker Yakp	KTM 450 Rally Factory Replica	Wu Pa Da Hai Dao Rally Team	Rally2
56	(Spain) Sandra Gómez Cantero	KTM 450 Rally Factory Replica	Xraids Experience	Rally2
57	(United Kingdom) Makis Dewi Rees-Stavros	Husqvarna FR450 Rally	Stavros	Rally2
58	(China) Zhang Min	KTM 450 Rally Factory Replica	Wu Pa Da Hai Dao Rally Team	Rally2
59	(Chile) John William Medina Salazar	KTM 450 Rally Replica	M3 Rally Team	Rally2
60	(Guatemala) Francisco Arredondo	KTM 450 Rally Factory Replica	BAS World KTM Racing Team	Rally2
61	(China) Zhao Hongyi	KTM 450 Rally Factory Replica	Wu Pa Da Hai Dao Rally Team	Rally2
63	(United States) Petr Vlček	KTM 450 Rally	Detyens Racing	Rally2
64	(Spain) Josep Maria Mas Arcos	Husqvarna 450 Rally Replica	FAE Pedrega Team 77	Rally2
65	(France) Guillaume Chollet	KTM 450 Rally Factory Replica		Rally2
66	(Italy) Alex Salvini	Fantic 450 Rally	Fantic Rally Team	Rally2
67	(Italy) Franco Picco	Fantic 450 Rally	Fantic Rally Team	Rally2
68	(Spain) Tosha Schareina	KTM 450 Rally Replica	BAS Dakar KTM Racing Team	RallyGP
69	(Spain) Cesar Rojo	KTM 450 Rally	BAS World KTM Racing Team	Rally2
70	(Saudi Arabia) Mishal Alghuneim	Husqvarna FR 450 Rally	Saudi Dirtbike Center	Rally2
71	(Kuwait) Abdullah Al Shatti	KTM 450 Rally	MX Ride Dubai	Rally2
72	(France) Philippe Gendron	KTM 450 Rally Replica	Nomade Racing	Rally2
73	(Italy) Tiziano Interno	Fantic XEF 450 Rally Factory	Rally POV	Rally2
74	(France) Michael Jacobi	Gas Gas 450 Rally Replica	Comas Moto VTA	Rally2
75	(France) Edouard Leconte	KTM 450 Rally Replica	Team Dumontier Racing	Rally2
76	(France) Jean-Loup Lepan	KTM 450 Rally Replica	Nomade Racing	Rally2
77	(Argentina) Luciano Benavides	Husqvarna 450 Rally Factory Replica	Husqvarna Factory Racing	RallyGP
79	(Czech Republic) Libor Podmol	Husqvarna 450 Rally	Podmol Dakar Team	Rally2
80	(United Kingdom) James Martyn Hillier	Gas Gas 450 Rally	Rich Energy OMG Racing Ltd	Rally2
81	(China) Ming Ji Fang	Kove 450	Kove Rally Team	Rally2
82	(Serbia) Gabor Saghmeister	KTM 450 Rally Replica	Saghmeister Team	Rally2
83	(France) Julien Jagu	KTM 450 Rally Replica	Drag'On Rally Team	Rally2
85	(China) Liansong Deng	Kove 450	Kove Rally Team	Rally2
86	(France) Charlie Herbst	KTM 450 Rally Replica	Team All Tracks	Rally2
87	(Italy) Lorenzo Maria Fanottoli	KTM 450 Rally Factory Replica	Tecnosport	Rally2
88	(France) Cédric Jacques	KTM 450 Rally	Team RS Concept	Rally2
89	(China) Sunier Sunier (Ni-Er Su)	Kove 450	Kove Rally Team	Rally2
90	(South Africa) Kirsten Landman	KTM 450 Rally Replica	ASP Rope Access International	Rally2
91	(Germany) Mike Wiedemann	KTM 450 Rally Replica	Wiedemannn Motorsports	Rally2
93	(Denmark) Thomas Kongshøj	Husqvarna 450 Rally Replica	Joyride Race Service	Rally2
95	(Venezuela) Nicolas Alberto Cardona Vagnoni	KTM 450 Rally Replica	Pedrega Team	Rally2
96	(United States) Jacob Argubright	Husqvarna 450 Rally Replica	Duust Rally Team	Rally2
98	(France) Fabien Domas	Yamaha 450	Dragon	Rally2
99	(Spain) Javi Vega	Yamaha WR450F Rally	Pont Grup Yamaha	Rally2
100	(South Africa) Stuart Gregory	KTM 450 Rally Replica	Stuart Gregory	Rally2
101	(United States) Kyle McCoy	KTM 450 Rally Replica	American Rally Originals	Rally2
102	(United States) Paul Neff	KTM 450 Rally Factory Replica	American Rally Originals	Rally2
103	(United States) David Pearson	KTM 450 Rally Replica	American Rally Originals	Rally2
104	(United States) James Pearson	KTM 450 Rally Replica	American Rally Originals	Rally2
105	(United States) Morrison Hart	KTM 450 Rally Replica	American Rally Originals	Rally2
106	(France) Bertrand Gavard	Husqvarna 450 Rally	Team RS Concept	Rally2
107	(Italy) Lorenzo Maestrami	KTM 450 Rally Replica	Nomade Racing	Rally2
108	(France) Julien Barthélémy	Honda CRF450RX Rally RS	RS Moto Racing Team	Rally2
109	(France) Kévin Durand	Honda CRF450RX Rally RS	RS Moto Racing Team	Rally2
110	(France) Pierre Peyrard	KTM 450 Rally Replica	Nomade Racing	Rally2
111	(South Africa) Michael Docherty	Husqvarna FR 450 Rally	HT Rally Raid Husqvarna Racing	Rally2
112	(France) Arnault Chardron	Yamaha WR450F	Outsider	Rally2
114	(France) Neels Theric	Gas Gas 450 Rally	Theric	Rally2
116	(Spain) Fernando Domínguez	KTM 450 Rally Replica	Diputacion de Cuenca	Rally2
117	(Italy) Ottavio Missoni	Honda CRF450R	Ottavio Missoni	Rally2
118	(France) Benjamin Lepelley	Husqvarna 450 Rally	Team Dumontier Racing	Rally2
119	(France) Loïs d'Abbadie	Husqvarna 450 Rally	Loïs d'Abbadie	Rally2
120	(Netherlands) Wesley Aaldering	Husqvarna FR 450 Rally	HT Rally Raid Husqvarna Racing	Rally2
121	(South Africa) Stevan Wilken	Husqvarna FR 450 Rally	HT Rally Raid Husqvarna Racing	Rally2
122	(Canada) Gareth Jones	Husqvarna FR 450 Rally	HT Rally Raid Husqvarna Racing	Rally2
123	(France) Rodolphe de Palmas	KTM 450 Rally Replica	Nomade Racing	Rally2
124	(Italy) Tommaso Montanari	Husqvarna 450 Rally Factory Replica	Solarys Racing	Rally2
125	(Italy) Iader Giraldi	KTM 450 Rally Factory Replica	Solarys Racing	Rally2
126	(France) Stéphane Hamard	Husqvarna 450 Rally Factory	Reunion Rallye Raid	Rally2
127	(United States) Lawrence Ace Nilson	KTM 450 Rally Replica	Duust Racing Team	Rally2
128	(France) Clément Razy	KTM 450 Rally	Clément Razy	Rally2
129	(France) David Gaits	KTM 450 Rally	Happyness Racing Igoa Moto	Rally2
130	(Italy) Eufrasio Anghileri	Honda CRF450RX Rally RS	RS Moto Racing Team	Rally2
131	(Spain) Sergio Vaquero	KTM 450 Rally Replica	KTM Namura Bikes	Rally2
132	(Spain) Javier San José Yétor	KTM 450 Rally Replica	Padrega Team	Rally2
133	(Spain) Ruben Saldaña Goñi	KTM 450 Rally Factory Replica	Padrega Team	Rally2
137	(France) Mathieu Troquier	KTM 450 Rally Replica	Nomade Racing	Rally2
142	(Slovakia) Štefan Svitko	KTM 450 Rally Factory Replica	Cross Team	RallyGP
158	(Argentina) Carlos Alejandro Verza	Yamaha Raptor 700R	Verza Rally Team	Rally2
171	(Spain) Daniel Vila Vaques	Yamaha Raptor 700R	DV4 Powered by Motul	Rally2

Withdrawals before the start:

- 23 Konrad Dąbrowski - Appendicitis
- 78 Ali Oukerbouch
- 92 Ignacio Sanchis - Crashed in Shakedown, broke his clavicula

Entry list — Quads

Note
– The "Dakar Legends" - competitors that participated in 10 or more Dakar events.
– The first time starters - "rookies".
– Competitors that were not able to start the race.
– Competitors participating in "Original by Motul" — limited assistance marathon class.

No.	Driver	Quad	Team
151	(France) Alexandre Giroud		
152	(Argentina) Manuel Andújar		
153	(Slovakia) Juraj Varga		
154	(Argentina) Francisco Moreno Flores		
155	(Poland) Kamil Wiśniewski		
156	(Czech Republic) Zdeněk Tůma		
159	(Brazil) Marcelo Medeiros		
160	(France) Axel Dutrie		
162	(Lithuania) Laisvydas Kancius		
163	(United States) Pablo Copetti		
164	(Spain) Toni Vingut		
165	(France) Sébastien Souday		
166	(Chile) Giovanni Enrico		
167	(United Arab Emirates) Abdulaziz Ahli		
169	(Argentina) Alejandro Fantoni		
170	(France) Xavier Verbeke		

Withdrawals before the start:

- 168 Julio Estanguet

Entry list — Cars

Note
– The "Dakar Legends" - competitors that participated in 10 or more Dakar events.
– The first time starters - "rookies".
– Competitors that were not able to start the race.

No.	Driver	Co-driver	Vehicle	Team	Class
200	(Qatar) Nasser Al-Attiyah	(France) Mathieu Baumel	Toyota GR DKR Hilux	Toyota Gazoo Racing	T1+
201	(France) Sébastien Loeb	(Belgium) Fabian Lurquin	Prodrive Hunter T1+	Bahrain Raid Xtreme	T1+
202	(Saudi Arabia) Yazeed Al-Rajhi	(Germany) Dirk von Zitzewitz	Toyota Hilux Overdrive	Overdrive Racing	T1+
203	(Poland) Jakub Przygoński	(Spain) Armand Monleón	Mini John Cooper Works Rally Plus	X-raid Mini JCW Team	T1+
204	(France) Stéphane Peterhansel	(France) Édouard Boulanger	Audi RS Q e-tron	Team Audi Sport	T1.U
205	(South Africa) Giniel De Villiers	(South Africa) Dennis Murphy	Toyota GR DKR Hilux	Toyota Gazoo Racing	T1+
206	(France) Guerlain Chicherit	(France) Alex Winocq	Prodrive Hunter T1+	GCK Motorsport	T1+
207	(Spain) Carlos Sainz	(Spain) Lucas Cruz	Audi RS Q e-tron	Team Audi Sport	T1.U
208	(Argentina) Orlando Terranova	(Spain) Alex Haro Bravo	Prodrive Hunter T1+	Bahrain Raid Xtreme	T1+
209	(France) Mathieu Serradori	(France) Loic Minaudier	Century CR6-T	Century Racing Factory Team	T1.2
210	(Czech Republic) Martin Prokop	(Czech Republic) Viktor Chytka	Ford Raptor RS Cross Country	Benzina Orlen Team	T1+
211	(Sweden) Mattias Ekström	(Sweden) Emil Bergkvist	Audi RS Q e-tron	Team Audi Sport	T1.U
212	(Argentina) Sebastián Halpern	(Argentina) Bernardo Graue	Mini John Cooper Works Rally Plus	X-raid Mini JCW Team	T1+
213	(Lithuania) Vaidotas Žala	(Portugal) Paulo Fiúza	Prodrive Hunter T1+	Teltonika Racing	T1+
214	(Lithuania) Benediktas Vanagas	(Estonia) Kuldar Sikk	Toyota GR DKR Hilux	Toyota Gazoo Racing Baltics	T1+
215	(Netherlands) Erik Van Loon	(France) Sébastien Delaunay	Toyota Hilux Overdrive	Overdrive Racing	T1+
216	(South Africa) Brian Baragwanath	(South Africa) Leonard Cremer	Century CR6-T	Century Racing Factory Team	T1.2
217	(South Africa) Henk Lategan	(South Africa) Brett Cummings	Toyota GR DKR Hilux	Toyota Gazoo Racing	T1+
218	(France) Christian Lavieille	(France) Valentin Sarreaud	MD Rallye Sport Optimus	MD Rallye Sport	T1.2
219	(France) Lionel Baud	(France) Rémi Boulanger	Toyota Hilux Overdrive	Overdrive Toyota	T1+
220	(Argentina) Juan Cruz Yacopini	(Spain) Daniel Oliveras Carreras	Toyota Hilux Overdrive	Overdrive Toyota	T1+
221	(United Arab Emirates) Khalid Al Qassimi	(Norway) Ola Fløene	Mini John Cooper Works Buggy	X-raid Mini JCW Team	T1.2
222	(Spain) Laia Sanz	(Italy) Maurizio Gerini	Astara 01 Concept	Astara Team	T1.2
223	(France) Pierre Lachaume	(Belgium) Francois Beguin	MD Rallye Sport Optimus	MD Rallye Sport	T1.2
224	(China) Wei Han	(China) Li Ma	SMG HW2021	Hanwei Motorsport Team	T1.2
225	(Czech Republic) Miroslav Zapletal	(Slovakia) Marek Sýkora	Ford F150 Evo	Offroadsport	T1.1
227	(Netherlands) Tim Coronel	(Netherlands) Tom Coronel	Century CR6	Coronel Dakar Team	T1.2
228	(France) Jean Remy Bergounhe	(France) Lionel Costes	MD Rallye Sport Optimus	MD Rallye Sport	T1.2
229	(Spain) Isidre Esteve Pujol	(Spain) José Maria Villalobos Valcarcel	Toyota Hilux Overdrive	Repsol Rally Team	T1+
230	(Brazil) Lucas Moraes	(Germany) Timo Gottschalk	Toyota Hilux Overdrive	Overdrive Racing	T1+
231	(France) Romain Dumas	(France) Max Delfino	Toyota GR DKR Hilux T1+	Rebellion Racing	T1+
232	(France) Jérôme Pélichet	(France) Pascal Larroque	MD Rallye Sport Optimus	Raidlynx	T1.2
233	(China) Guoyu Zhang	(France) Jean-Pierre Garcin	BAIC BJ40	BAIC ORV	T1+
234	(Spain) Óscar Fuertes Aldanondo	(Spain) Diego Vallejo	Astara 01 Concept	Astara Team	T1.2
235	(Germany) Daniel Schröder	(South Africa) Ryan Bland	Nissan Navara VK50	PS Laser	T1.1
236	(France) Simon Vitse	(France) Frédéric Lefebvre	MD Rallye Sport Optimus Evo 4	MD Rallye Sport	T1.2
237	(China) Po Tian	(China) Xuanyi Du	SMG HW2021	Hanwei Motorsport Team	T1.2
238	(Kyrgyzstan) (Note: Krotov is a Russian driver racing under a Kyrgyzstan licence) Denis Krotov	Konstantin Zhiltsov	Mini John Cooper Works Buggy	X-raid Mini JCW Team	T1.2
239	(France) Pascal Thomasse	(France) Gérard Dubuy	MD Rallye Sport Optimus	MD Rallye Sport	T1.2
240	(Lithuania) Gintas Petrus	(Portugal) José Marques	MD Rallye Sport Optimus Evo 3	Petrus Racing	T1.2
241	(Paraguay) Andrea Lafarja	(Argentina) Ashley García Chávez	Toyota Hilux Overdrive	Overdrive Toyota	T1+
242	(Spain) Carlos Checa	(Spain) Marc Solà Terradellas	Astara 01 Concept	Astara Team	T1.2
243	(Netherlands) Maik Willems	(Netherlands) Robert Van Pelt	Toyota Hilux Overdrive	Bastion Hotels Dakar Team	T1.1
245	(United Kingdom) Thomas Bell	(South Africa) Gerhard Schutte	Nissan Navara VK56	Red-Lined TBR	T1.1
246	(Japan) Akira Miura	(France) Laurent Lichtleuchter	Toyota Land Cruiser 300GR	Toyota Auto Body	T2
247	(Netherlands) Michel Kremer	(Netherlands) Thomas de Bois	Century CR6	Coronel Dakar Team	T1.2
248	(China) Zi Yunliang	(China) He Sha	BAIC BJ40	BAIC ORV	T1+
250	(France) Ronald Basso	(France) Jean Michel Polato	Toyota Land Cruiser VDJ200	Toyota Auto Body	T2
251	(Switzerland) Alexandre Pesci	(Switzerland) Stephan Kuhni	Toyota GR DKR Hilux T1+	Rebellion Racing	T1+
252	(France) Gerard Tramoni	(France) Dominique Totain	Oryx Sadev BV2	Team 100% Sud Ouest	T1.2
253	(France) Jean Pierre Strugo	(France) Christophe Crespo	MD Rallye Sport Optimus	MD Rallye Sport	T1.2
254	(France) Hugues Moilet	(Belgium) Olivier Imschoot	MD Rallye Sport Optimus	Off Road Concept	T1.2
255	(Spain) Sergio Vallejo	(Spain) Mario Gozalez Tomé	Century CR6	Astara Racing	T1.2
256	(Spain) Manuel Plaza Pérez	(Spain) Monica Plaza Vazquez	Sodicars BV2	Sodicars Racing	T1.2
258	(France) Yannick Panagiotis	(France) Valérie Panagiotis	Century CR6	Team FJ	T1.2
259	(Saudi Arabia) Ibrahim Almuhna	(Saudi Arabia) Saud Nasser Altamimi	Nissan Patrol	Ibrahm Almuhna	T2
261	(France) Philippe Raud	(France) Maxime Raud	Sodicars BV2	Sodicars Racing	T1.1
262	(France) Ludovic Gherardi	(France) François Borsotto	MD Rallye Sport Optimus	MD Rallye Sport	T1.2
263	(Netherlands) Ronald van Loon	(Netherlands) Erik Lemmen	Nissan Navara VK50	Oase Motorsport	T1.1
264	(France) Antoine Galland	(Czech Republic) David Kripal	Century CR6	Off Road Concept	T1.2
266	(Netherlands) Dave Klaassen	(Netherlands) Tessa Rooth	Nissan Navara VK56	Daklapack Rally Sport	T1.1
267	(France) Roger Audas	(France) Patrick Prot	Sodicars BV2	Sodicars Racing	T1.2
269	(Poland) Magdalena Zając	(Poland) Jacek Czachor	Toyota Hilux	Proxcars TME Rally Team	T1.1
270	(Czech Republic) Karel Trněný	(Czech Republic) Milan Horyl	Ford F150 Raptor	Workoutland ACCR Czech Team	T1.1
275	(Estonia) Urvo Männama	(Estonia) Risto Lepik	Toyota Gazoo Racing Hilux	Rally Raid Estonia	T1+
276	(France) Jean-Philippe Beziat	(France) Vincent Albira	MD Rallye Sport Optimus	MD Rallye Sport	T1.2
278	(France) Marco Piana	(France) Nicolas Garnier	Toyota Land Cruiser	Xtremeplus Polaris Factory Team	T1.1

Withdrawals before the start:

- 226 Antanas Juknevičius / Didzis Zariņš
- 249 Mohamad Altwijri / Yasser Alhajjaj
- 257 Koen Wauters / Pascal Feryn - issue at scrutiny
- 260 Abdulaziz Alyaeesh
- 268 Tom De Leeuw / Cedric Feryn - issue at scrutiny
- 271 Gurbanberdi Danatarow / Didar Orazmedow
- 272 Hydyrberdi Abduhrahmanov / Muhammetmyrat Gurbanov

Entry list — Light Prototypes

Note
– The "Dakar Legends" - competitors that participated in 10 or more Dakar events.
– The first time starters - "rookies".
– Competitors that were not able to start the race.

No.	Driver	Co-driver	Vehicle	Team
300	(Chile) Francisco López Contardo	(Chile) Juan Pablo Latrach Vinagre	Can-Am Maverick XRS	Red Bull Can-Am Factory Team
301	(United States) Seth Quintero	(Germany) Dennis Zenz	Can-Am Maverick XRS	Red Bull Off-Road JR Team USA By BFG
302	(Spain) Cristina Gutiérrez	(Spain) Pablo Moreno Huete	Can-Am Maverick XRS	Red Bull Can-Am Factory Team
303	(United States) Austin Jones	(Brazil) Gustavo Gugelmin	Can-Am Maverick XRS	Red Bull Off-Road JR Team USA By BFG
304	(Belgium) Guillaume De Mévius	(France) François Cazalet	OT3 - 04	Grallyteam
305	(Spain) Santiago Navarro	(France) Adrien Metge	Can-Am Maverick X3	FN Speed Team
306	(France) Jean-Luc Ceccaldi-Pisson	(France) Cédric Duplé	PH-Sport Zephyr	JLC Racing
307	(Germany) Annett Fischer	(Sweden) Annie Seel	Yamaha X-Raid YXZ 1000R Turbo Prototype	X-Raid Yamaha Supported Team
308	(Spain) Fernando Álvarez Castellano	(France) Xavier Panseri	Can-Am Maverick X3	South Racing Can-Am
309	(Saudi Arabia) Saleh Alsaif	(Portugal) João Pedro Vitoria Re	Can-Am Maverick X3	Black Horse Team
311	(Italy) Camelia Liparoti	(Spain) Xavier Blanco García	Yamaha X-Raid YXZ 1000R Turbo Prototype	X-Raid Yamaha Supported Team
312	(Saudi Arabia) Dania Akeel	(Uruguay) Sergio Lafuente	Can-Am Maverick XRS	South Racing Can-Am
314	(United States) Mitch Guthrie	(United States) Kellon Walch	MCE-5 Development T3M	Red Bull Off-Road JR Team USA By BFG
315	(France) Michael Pisano	(France) Mayeul Barbet	MMP Can-Am	MMP
317	(France) Antoine Méo	(France) Fabien Planet	PH-Sport Zephyr	Team PH-Sport
318	(Spain) Joan Font	(Spain) Themis López	Can-Am Maverick X3	FN Speed Team
319	(Portugal) Hélder Rodrigues	(Portugal) Gonçalo Reis	Can-Am Maverick XRS	South Racing Can-Am
320	(Saudi Arabia) Mashael Alobaidan	(Italy) Paolo Ceci	Can-Am Maverick XRS	South Racing Can-Am
321	(Qatar) Ahmed Alkuwari Fahad	(Italy) Manuel Lucchese	Yamaha X-Raid YXZ 1000R Turbo Prototype	X-Raid Yamaha Supported Team
322	(Chile) Ignacio Casale	(Chile) Alvaro Leon	Yamaha X-Raid YXZ 1000R Turbo Prototype	X-Raid Yamaha Supported Team
323	(Spain) Merce Marti	(Netherlands) Lisette Bakker	Yamaha X-Raid YXZ 1000R Turbo Prototype	X-Raid Yamaha Supported Team
324	(Spain) Jordi Segura Vidiella	(Spain) Sergi Brugué	Can-Am Maverick X3	FN Speed Team
325	(France) Jean - Pascal Besson	(France) Delphine Delfino	MMP Can-Am	MMP
326	(Spain) Xavier Foj	(Spain) Antonio Angulo	AMS Oryx T3	Foj Motorsport
327	(Netherlands) Anja van Loon	(Ukraine) Dmytro Tsyro	Can-Am Maverick XRS	South Racing Can-Am
328	(Portugal) Ricardo Porém	(Argentina) Agusto Sanz	Yamaha X-Raid YXZ 1000R Turbo Prototype	X-Raid Yamaha Supported Team
329	(Argentina) David Zille	(Argentina) Sebastian Cesana	Can-Am Maverick XRS	South Racing Can-Am
330	(Colombia) Javier Vélez	(Colombia) Mateo Moreno Kristiansen	Can-Am Maverick X3	FN Speed Team
331	(United Arab Emirates) Khalid Aljafla	(Belarus) Andrei Rudnitski		Aljafla Racing
332	(France) Claude Fournier	(France) Arnold Brucy	Can-Am Maverick X3	Team BBR / Pole Position 77
334	(France) José Castan	(France) Jean-François Palissier	Can-Am	RM Sport
335	(Chile) Lucas Del Rio	(Argentina) Bruno Jacomy	Can-Am Maverick XRS	South Racing Can-Am
336	(Ecuador) Brad Salazar	(Argentina) Eugenio Andres Arrieta	Can-Am Maverick X3	FN Speed Team
337	(Portugal) João Ferreira	(Portugal) Filipe Palmeiro	Yamaha X-Raid YXZ 1000R Turbo Prototype	X-Raid Yamaha Supported Team
338	(Spain) Rafael Lesmes Suárez	(Spain) Eduardo Rafael Naval Pérez	Can-Am Maverick	TH-Trucks Canarias Team
339	(South Africa) Ebenhaezer Basson	(South Africa) Bertus Leander Pienaar	OT3 - 04	Grallyteam
340	(Netherlands) Hans Weijs	(Netherlands) Rudolf Meijer	Arcane T3	Arcane Racing
341	(South Africa) Geoff Minnitt	(South Africa) Gerhard Snyman	Can-Am Maverick XRS	South Racing Can-Am
342	(France) Benjamin Lattard	(France) Patrick Jimbert	MMP Can-Am	MMP
343	(Netherlands) Roger Grouwels	(Netherlands) Maurice van Weersch	Arcane T3	Arcane Racing
344	(Seychelles) Aliyyah Koloc	(France) Stéphane Duplé	Buggyra Can-Am ZV21	Buggyra ZM Academy
345	(Czech Republic) Josef Macháček	(Czech Republic) David Schovanek	Buggyra Can-Am ZV21	Buggyra ZM Academy
346	(Brazil) Pâmela Bozzano	(Brazil) Carlos Sachs	Can-Am Maverick X3	Team BBR / Pole Position 77
347	(Brazil) Enio Bozzano Junior	(Brazil) Luciano Gómez	Can-Am Maverick X3	Team BBR / Pole Position 77
348	(Colombia) António Marmolejo	(Argentina) Ariel Jatón	Can-Am Maverick XRS	South Racing Can-Am
349	(Spain) Alfredo Rubio Fernández	(Spain) Luis Alberto Benedicto San Antonio	Can-Am Maverick X3	Buggy Masters Team
350	(Uruguay) Patricia Pita Gago	(Argentina) Rubén García	Can-Am Maverick	Proracing Competicion Rallye Servicios

Entry list — SSV

Note
– The "Dakar Legends" - competitors that participated in 10 or more Dakar events.
– The first time starters - "rookies".
– Late entries.
– Competitors that were not able to start the race.

No.	Driver	Co-driver	Vehicle	Team
400	(Lithuania) Rokas Baciuška	(Spain) Oriol Vidal Montijano	Can-Am Maverick XRS	Red Bull Can-Am Factory Team
401	(Poland) Marek Goczał	(Poland) Maciej Marton	Can-Am Maverick XRS	Energylandia Rally Team
402	(Spain) Gerard Farrés	(Spain) Diego Ortega Gil	Can-Am Maverick XRS	Can-Am Factory South Racing
405	(Poland) Michał Goczał	(Poland) Szymon Gospodarczyk	Can-Am Maverick XRS	Energylandia Rally Team
406	(Brazil) Rodrigo Luppi De Oliveira	(Brazil) Maykel Justo	Can-Am Maverick XRS	South Racing Can-Am
407	(Spain) Pau Navarro	(France) Michaël Metge	Can-Am Maverick X3	FN Speed Team
408	(France) Éric Abel	(France) Serge Gounon	Can-Am Maverick X3	Team BBR/Pole Position 77
409	(Brazil) Bruno Conti de Oliveira	(Portugal) Pedro Bianchi Prata	Can-Am Maverick	South Racing Can-Am
410	(Saudi Arabia) Yasir Seaidan	(United Arab Emirates) (Note: Kuzmich is a Russian driver racing under a United Arab Emirates licence) Alexey Kuzmich	Can-Am Maverick XRS	South Racing Can-Am
411	(Argentina) Nicolás Cavigliasso	(Argentina) Valentina Pertegarini	Can-Am Maverick X3	Cavigliasso
412	(Argentina) Jeremías González Ferioli	(Argentina) Pedro Gonzalo Rinaldi	Can-Am Maverick XRS	South Racing Can-Am
414	(Australia) Molly Taylor	(United States) Andrew Short	Can-Am Maverick XRS	South Racing Can-Am
415	(France) Xavier de Soultrait	(France) Martin Bonnet	Polaris RZR Pro R	Sébastien Loeb Racing - Bardahl Team
416	(Lithuania) Tomas Jančys	(Lithuania) Irmantas Bražiūnas	Can-Am Maverick X3	Mediafon Team
417	(Mozambique) Paulo Oliveira	(Portugal) Miguel Alberty	Can-Am Maverick X3	Mozambique 2023
418	(France) Florent Vayssade	(France) Nicolas Rey	Polaris RZR Pro R	Sébastien Loeb Racing - Bardahl Team
419	(Argentina) Juan Manuel Silva	(France) Xavier Flick	Can-Am Maverick X3	FN Speed Team
420	(Italy) Pietro Cinotto	(Italy) Alberto Bertoldi	Polaris RZR Pro R	Xtremeplus Polaris Factory Team
421	(Netherlands) Paul Spierings	(Netherlands) Jan-Pieter van der Stelt	Can-Am Maverick X3	Dakar Team Spierings
422	(Austria) Nicolas Brabeck-Letmathe	(France) Brice Aloth	Can-Am Maverick XRS	Team Casteu
423	(Spain) Juan Miguel Fidel Medero	(Spain) Javier Ventaja Cruz	Can-Am Maverick X3	FN Speed Team
424	(France) Frédéric Chesneau	(France) Stéphane Chesneau	Can-Am Maverick	FS 21
425	(Estonia) Toomas Triisa	(Estonia) Mart Meeru	Can-Am Maverick X3	Redmoto Estonia
427	(Spain) Pedro Manuel Peñate Muñoz	(Spain) Rosa Romero Font	Can-Am Maverick X3	TH-Trucks Canarias Team
428	(Poland) Eryk Goczał	(Spain) Oriol Mena	Can-Am Maverick XRS	Energylandia Rally Team
429	(France) Jean-Claude Pla	(France) Cyril Pla	Polaris RZR Pro R	Xtremeplus Polaris Factory Team
430	(Ecuador) Sebastian Guayasamin	(Argentina) Ricardo Adrian Torlaschi	Can-Am Maverick XRS	South Racing Can-Am
431	(Argentina) Ramón Núñez	(Argentina) Mauro Esteban Lipez	Can-Am Maverick XRS	Sodicars Racing
432	(Italy) Ferdinando Brachetti Peretti	(Italy) Matteo Casuccio	Polaris RZR Pro R	Xtremeplus Polaris Factory Team
433	(Spain) Ricardo Ramilo Suarez	(Portugal) David Ribeiro Teles Megre	Can-Am Maverick X3	Scuderia Ramilo
434	(France) Christophe Cresp	(France) Jean Brucy	MMP Can-Am	MMP
435	(Italy) Michele Cinotto	(Italy) Maurizio Dominella	Polaris RZR Pro R	Xtremeplus Polaris Factory Team
436	(France) Benoît Lepiètre	(France) Peter Serra	Can-Am Maverick X3	My X Racing
437	(Brazil) Cristiano Batista	(Spain) Fausto Mota	Can-Am Maverick X3	South Racing Can-Am
438	(France) Éric Croquelois	(France) Jean-Luc Martin	Can-Am Maverick	Drag'On Rally Team
439	(Japan) Shinsuke Umeda	(Argentina) Facundo Jaton	Polaris RZR Pro R	Xtremeplus Polaris Factory Team
440	(Netherlands) Gert-Jan Van Der Valk	(Netherlands) Branco De Lange	Can-Am Maverick	South Racing Can-Am
441	(France) Stéphane Consani	(France) Thibault Jean de la Haye	MMP Can-Am	MMP
442	(Italy) Carlo Cinotto	(Italy) Marco Arnoletti	Polaris RZR Pro R	Xtremeplus Polaris Factory Team
443	(Spain) Oscar Ral Verdu	(Spain) Carlos Jimenez Valls	Can-Am Maverick X3	Buggy Masters Team
444	(Spain) Carlos Vento Sánchez	(Spain) Carlos Ruiz Moreno	Can-Am Maverick X3	Patriots Racing Team
446	(France) Christophe Baillet	(France) Jean-Louis Simon Herbeth	MMP Can-Am	MMP
447	(Italy) Rebecca Busi	(Italy) Giulia Maroni	Can-Am Maverick	HRT-Technology
448	(Chile) Luis Diaz Soza	(Chile) Stanley Sherrington	Can-Am Maverick X3	FN Speed Team
469	(Netherlands) Jeffrey Otten	(Netherlands) Marco Bouman	Can-Am Maverick X3	Gaia Motorsports

Withdrawals before the start:

- 404 moved to T3 - 335
- 426 Emilija Gelažninkienė / Arūnas Gelažninkas
- 445 moved to T3 - 348

Entry list — Trucks

Note
– The "Dakar Legends" - competitors that participated in 10 or more Dakar events.
– The first time starters - "rookies".
– Late entries.
– Competitors that were not able to start the race.

No.	Driver	Co-driver	Technician	Vehicle	Team	Class
500	(Netherlands) Kees Koolen	(Netherlands) Wouter de Graaf	(Netherlands) Wouter Rosegaar	Iveco PowerStar	Projekt 2030	
501	(Czech Republic) Martin Macík Jr.	(Czech Republic) František Tomášek	(Czech Republic) David Švanda	Iveco PowerStar	MM Technology	
502	(Netherlands) Janus van Kasteren	(Poland) Darek Rodewald	(Netherlands) Marcel Snijders	Iveco PowerStar	Boss Machinery Team De Rooy Iveco	
503	(Czech Republic) Martin Šoltys	(Czech Republic) Roman Krejčí	(Czech Republic) David Hoffmann	Tatra 815	Tatra Buggyra Slovakia	
504	(Netherlands) Victor Willem Corne Versteijnen	(Netherlands) Andreas Wilhelmus Michiel Marius van der Sande	(Netherlands) Teun van Dal	Iveco PowerStar	Boss Machinery Team De Rooy Iveco	
505	(Czech Republic) Jaroslav Valtr	(Czech Republic) Rene Kilian	(Czech Republic) Tomáš Šikola	Tatra Phoenix	Buggyra Racing Team	
506	(Netherlands) Martin van den Brink	(Netherlands) Rijk Mouw	(Netherlands) Erik Kofman	Iveco PowerStar	Eurol Team De Rooy Iveco	
507	(Netherlands) Pascal de Baar	(Netherlands) Stefan Slootjes	(Poland) Marcin Krüger	Renault C460	Riwald Dakar Team	
508	(Czech Republic) Aleš Loprais	(Czech Republic) Petr Pokora	(Czech Republic) Jaroslav Valtr Jr	Praga V4S DKR	Instaforex Loprais Praga	
509	(Czech Republic) Tomáš Vrátný	(Czech Republic) Jaromír Martinec	(Poland) Bartłomiej Boba	Tatra Jamal	Fesh Fesh Team	
510	(Netherlands) Richard de Groot	(Netherlands) Mark Laan	(Netherlands) Jan Hulsebosch	Iveco Strator	Firemen Dakar Team	
511	(Netherlands) Mitchel van den Brink	(Netherlands) Jarno van de Pol	(Spain) Moi Torrallardona	Iveco PowerStar	Eurol Team De Rooy Iveco	
512	(Netherlands) Ben van de Laar	(Netherlands) Jan van de Laar	(Netherlands) Adolph Huijgens	Iveco 4x4 DRNL	Fried Van De Laar Racing	
514	(Lithuania) Vaidotas Paškevičius	(Lithuania) Tomas Gužauskas	(Lithuania) Slavomir Volkov	Tatra Jamal	Fesh Fesh Team	
515	(Italy) Claudio Bellina	(Italy) Bruno Gotti	(Italy) Giulio Minelli	Iveco PowerStar	MM Technology	
516	(Netherlands) Egbert Wingens	(Netherlands) Marije van Ettekoven	(Netherlands) Marijn Beekmans	Iveco Strator	DDW Rally Team	
517	(Netherlands) Ben de Groot	(Netherlands) Tom Brekelmans	(Netherlands) Govert Boogaard	Iveco Strator	De Groot Sport	
518	(Germany) Mathias Behringer	(Netherlands) Hugo Kupper	(Germany) Robert Striebe	MAN	X-Raid Yamaha Supported Team	
519	(Japan) Teruhito Sugawara	(Japan) Hirokazu Somemiya	(Japan) Yuji Mochizuki	Hino 600-Hybrid	Hino Team Sugawara	
520	(Netherlands) Gert Huzink	(Netherlands) Rob Buursen	(Netherlands) Martin Roesink	Renault C460 Hybrid	Riwald Dakar Team	
521	(Netherlands) Gerrit Zuurmond	(Netherlands) Tjeerd Van Ballegooy	(Netherlands) Klaas Kwakkel	MAN TGA	Stichting Rainbow Truck Team	
522	(Spain) Jordi Juvanteny	(Spain) José Luis Criado	(Spain) Jordi Ballbé	MAN TGA 26.480	KH7 Epsilon	
523	(Andorra) Albert Llovera	(Andorra) Margot Llobera	(Czech Republic) Petr Vojkovský	Ford Cargo 4X4	Fesh Fesh Team	
524	(Italy) Umberto Fiori	(Italy) Dario de Lorenzo	(Italy) Aldo de Lorenzo	MAN	Team TH	
525	(Spain) Alberto Herrero	(Spain) Susana Hernando Inés	(Spain) Mario Rodríguez Sastre	Scania Topedo	TH-Trucks	
526	(Netherlands) Ad Hofmans	(Netherlands) Remon van der Steen	(Netherlands) Mark Salomons	DAF CF75	De Groot Sport	
527	(Spain) Rafael Tibau Maynou	(Spain) Arnald Bastida Ubals	(Spain) Jordi Esteve Oro	Scania	TH-Trucks Team	
528	(Netherlands) Nico Antonius Petrus Stijnen	(Netherlands) Joël Ebbers	(Netherlands) Christiaan Johannes Michael van der Haar	Iveco Trakker	Eurol Rallysport	
529	(Belgium) Dave Ingels	(Netherlands) Johannes Schotanus	(Portugal) Joao Dias	MAN TGA 26.480	South Racing Service	
530	(Hungary) Miklós Kovács	(Hungary) Péter Czeglédi	(Hungary) Ács László	Scania	Qualisport Racing	
531	(Slovakia) Robert Kasak	(Slovakia) Tomáš Kazarka	(Czech Republic) Jaroslav Kolář	Tatra Phoenix	Tatra Buggyra Slovakia	
532	(Portugal) José Martins	(France) Jérémie Gimbre	(France) Eric Simonin	Iveco Trakker	Team Boucou	
533	(Netherlands) William Jacobus Joha van Groningen	(Netherlands) Wesley van Groningen	(Netherlands) Marco van Oevern	Iveco NG3/BA 03	Dust Warriors	
534	(Belgium) Igor Bouwens	(Senegal) Syndiely Wade	(Belgium) Ulrich Boerboom	Iveco T-Way	Gregoor Racing Team	
535	(Germany) Michael Baumann	(Germany) Philipp Beier	(Germany) Sebastian Lindner	MAN TGA11	Q Motorsport Team	
536	(Czech Republic) Tomáš Tomeček	(Italy) Niccolo Funaioli	(Netherlands) Ard Munster	Tatra 815-2T0R45	South Racing Service	
537	(France) Sylvain Besnard	(France) Nicolas Falloux	(France) Sylvain Laliche	Renault TGA11	Toyota Auto Body	
538	(Netherlands) Adwin Hoondert	(Netherlands) Jasper Riezebos	(Netherlands) Erwin de Vos	Renault K520	Riwald Dakar Team	
539	(Belgium) Dave Berghmans	(France) Sam Koopmann	(Belgium) Tom Geuens	Iveco Trakker	Overdrive Racing	
540	(France) Richard Gonzalez	(France) Franck Maldonado	(France) Guillaume Gonzalez		Sodicars Racing	
541	(Spain) Pep Sabaté	(Spain) Jordi Montaner Busquets	(Spain) Pol Tibau Roura	MAN TGA 26.480	Bahrain Raid Xtreme	
542	(Czech Republic) Dušan Randýsek	(France) Joël Darboure	(France) Anthony Robineau	MAN TGA 18.480	Team SSP	
543	(Spain) Alex Aguirregaviria	(Spain) Francesc Salisi	(Spain) Jordi Perera	Mercedes 1844 AK 4x4	FN Speed Team	
544	(Spain) Jordi Celma Obiols	(France) Xavier Moreau	(Italy) Claudio Gianformaggio	Mercedes Axor 1936	PBX Team	
545	(Italy) Cesare Rickler Del Mare	(Spain) Oscar Bravo Garcia	No technician	MAN TGS	R Team	
546	(Germany) Stefan Henken	(Germany) Philipp Rettig	(Germany) Michael Helminger	MAN TGS 18.480	South Racing Service	
547	(Hungary) Zsolt Darázsi	(France) Pierre Calmon	(Slovakia) Palco Lubomir	MAN TGA 18.480	Team SSP	
548	(Saudi Arabia) Tariq Alrammah	(Algeria) Samir Benbekhti	(Algeria) Ramzi Osmani	Volvo	STA	
549	(Spain) Javier Jacoste	(Spain) Jose María Fontdevila Boloix	(Spain) Juan Francisco Silva Pineiro	MAN TGA	Astara Team	
550	(Algeria) Ahmed Benbekhti	(France) Bruno Seillet	(France) Mickaël Fauvel	MAN TGS	STA Competition	
551	(France) Jean-François Cazères	(France) Jean-Bernard Arette	(France) David Herlaut	DAF 75CF	Overdrive Racing	
552	(Italy) David Giovannetti	(Spain) Renato Delmastro	(France) Paco Fernandez	MAN 18285LAK	Xtremeplus Polaris Factory Team	
553	(France) Sébastien Fargeas	(Portugal) Armando Loureiro	(France) Luc Fertin	MAN TGA	Team Boucou	
554	(France) Philippe Perry	(France) Philippe Pedeche	No technician	Renault Kerax	Team Boucou	
555	(Netherlands) Giso Verschoor	(France) Laurent Lalanne	(Netherlands) Edwin van der Vegt	MAN TGA	Team SSP	

Withdrawals before the start:

- 556 Yann Pellegrin / Arnaud Ayala

Entry list — Classics

Note
– The "Dakar Legends" - competitors that participated in 10 or more Dakar events.
– The first time starters - "rookies".
– Competitors that were not able to start the race.

No.	Driver	Co-driver	Technician	Vehicle	Team	Class
700	(France) Serge Mogno	(France) Florent Drulhon	No technician	Toyota HDJ80	Team FSO	+97 Intermediate Average
701	(France) Jérôme Galpin	(France) Anne Galpin	No technician	Protruck	Team FJ	+97 High Average
703	(Spain) Kilian Revuelta	(Spain) Mercedes Montamarta	No technician	Toyota Land Cruiser	Toyota Classic	87-96 Moderate Average
704	(Spain) Carlos Santaolalla	(Spain) Aran Sol I Juanola	No technician	Toyota HDJ80	Toyota Classic	87-96 Moderate Average
706	(Belgium) Nicola Feryn	(Belgium) Kurt Keysers	No technician	withdrawn		
707	(Switzerland) Julien Texier	(France) Jérémy Athimon	No technician	Porsche Martiny	Team Logistic Rallye	-86 Intermediate Average
709	(Czech Republic) Ondřej Klymčiw	(United States) Bill Conger	No technician	Škoda LR130	Klymčiw Racing	-86 Moderate Average
710	(France) Frédéric Verdaguer	(France) Stéphane Xercavins	No technician	Volkswagen Transporter T3	Team Logistic Rallye	87-96 Moderate Average
711	(France) Philippe Jacquot	(France) Jean-Joseph Bachelier	No technician	Porsche Rothmans	Team Logistic Rallye	87-96 Intermediate Average
712	(Belgium) Diego Delespeaux	(France) Julie Verdaguer	No technician	Volkswagen Coccinelle	Team Logistic Rallye	-86 Intermediate Average
713	(Italy) Luca Venturi	(Italy) Robert Musi	No technician	Toyota HDJ100	DKR Dakar Classic Team	+97 Intermediate Average
714	(Switzerland) Céedric Zolliker	(Germany) Clemens Lansing	No technician	Toyota HDJ80	Zolliker-Lansing	87-96 Moderate Average
716	(Belgium) Rene Declercq	(Belgium) John Demeester	No technician	Bombardier Iltis	VW Iltis Team	-86 Moderate Average
717	(France) François Abrial	(France) Cyril Beltrami	No technician	Citroën Visa	Abrial	-86 Low Average
718	(France) Mathieu Abrial	(France) Thomas Viguier	No technician	Citroën Visa	Annecy Moteur	87-96 Moderate Average
719	(Austria) Andres Brabeck-Letmathe	(France) Éric Bersey	No technician	Mitsubishi Pajero	Team Casteu Classic	+97 Intermediate Average
720	(Austria) Peter Brabeck-Letmathe	(France) Jean-Michel Gayte	No technician	Mitsubishi Pajero	Team Casteu Classic	+97 Intermediate Average
721	(Italy) Luciano Carcheri	(Italy) Giovanni Francesco Bernacchini	No technician	Isuzu VehiCROSS	Tecnosport	+97 Intermediate Average
722	(Italy) Valentina Casella	(Italy) Monica Buonamano	No technician	Nissan Pathfinder	Tecnosport	+97 Intermediate Average
724	(Spain) Jose Vidanya	(Spain) Sergi Fernández García	No technician	Mitsubishi L200	Pedrega Team	+97 Intermediate Average
725	(Netherlands) Cornelis Lambert Kamp	(Netherlands) Jacobine Kamp-Noordsij	No technician	Citroën CX	CX Rally Team	-86 Low Average
726	(France) Christophe D’Indy	(France) François-Xavier Bourgois	No technician	Peugeot 504 Coupé V6 Carburateurs C31	Indy Racing	-86 Intermediate Average
727	(France) Vincent Tourneur	(France) Christian Lambert	No technician	Mitsubishi Pajero Ralliart T2	Ralliart Off Road Classic	87-96 Intermediate Average
728	(Belgium) Dirk van Rompuy	(Belgium) Christiaan Michel Goris	No technician	Toyota Land Cruiser HDJ80	TH-Trucks Team	87-96 Moderate Average
729	(Italy) Gian Paolo Tobia Cavagna	(Italy) Gianni Pelizzola	No technician	Nissan Patrol GR Y61	Team Tecnosport GECA	+97 Intermediate Average
730	(France) Christophe Berteloot	(France) Corinne Berteloot	No technician	Toyota HDJ80 12S	Team Pevele Aventure	87-96 Intermediate Average
731	(France) Olivier Mahul	(France) Loïc Gaillac	No technician	Peugeot P4 V6 PTS	Petitwell Racing	-86 Moderate Average
732	(France) Patrick Doby	(France) André Terrier	No technician	Toyota HDJ80 12S	Team Pevele Aventure	87-96 Intermediate Average
733	(Slovakia) Juraj Ulrich	(Slovakia) Lubos Schwarzbacher	No technician	Mitsubishi Pajero 3000 L141G	Ulrich Schwarzbacher Dakar Team	87-96 Intermediate Average
736	(France) Pascal Le Brun	(France) Audrey Rossat	No technician	Toyota HDJ80	Team FSO	87-96 Intermediate Average
737	(France) Guilaumme Maillard	(France) Faiza Maillard	No technician	Protruck	Team FJ	+97 High Average
738	(France) Frédéric Barlerin	(France) Magali Barlerin Simonot	No technician	Buggy Strakit	Rallye Fred	-86 Low Average
739	(Germany) Rainer Wissmanns	(France) Claire Deygas	No technician	Toyota Land Cruiser	Cummins France	87-96 Intermediate Average
740	(France) Patrick Sireyjol	(Switzerland) Thierry Fresard	No technician	Toyota Land Cruiser	Cummins France	87-96 Intermediate Average
742	(Italy) Stefano Moro	(Italy) Daniele Manoni	No technician	Mitsubishi Pajero Evolution	R Team	+97 Intermediate Average
743	(Belgium) Nicolas Delencre	(Belgium) Éric Vandormael	No technician	Land Rover Range P38 V8 4.6L	Nico Dakar	87-96 Low Average
744	(France) David Cupers	(France) Corinne Cupers	No technician	Toyota HDJ80 12S	Team Pevele Aventure	87-96 Intermediate Average
745	(Belgium) Eric Claeys	(Belgium) Tom Claeys	No technician	Toyota Land Cruiser 73	Claeyson	-86 Moderate Average
747	(Netherlands) Herman van Oldenmark	(Netherlands) Leonardus Schouten	No technician	Mitsubishi Pajero Evolution	Creative Action Holland Rally Team	+97 Intermediate Average
748	(Spain) Luis Pedrals Marot	(Spain) Jan Rosa I Viñas	No technician	Nissan Patrol K260	TH-Trucks Team	87-96 Moderate Average
749	(Czech Republic) Radek Vávra	(Czech Republic) Lukáš Vála	No technician	Nissan Patrol GR Y60	GPG	87-96 Moderate Average
750	(Switzerland) Urbano Alfonso Gherardo Clerici	(Italy) Nicola Alessio Colombo	No technician	Nissan Terrano 1	Tecnosport	87-96 Moderate Average
751	(France) Mickaël Ranchin	(France) Philippe Robert	No technician	Peugeot P4	Ecurie Freres D'Armes	87-96 Moderate Average
752	(Spain) Daniel Albero Puig	(Spain) Sonia Ledesma Gómez	No technician	Toyota Land Cruiser 90	Team un Diabético en el Dakar	+97 Intermediate Average
754	(Spain) Francisco Javier Benavente	(Spain) Rafael Benavente Del Rio	No technician	Nissan Terrano	Recinsa Sport	87-96 Moderate Average
755	(Czech Republic) Ondřej Martinec	(Czech Republic) Gabriel Zubor	No technician	Toyota Land Cruiser	Czech Samurais	+97 Intermediate Average
756	(Czech Republic) Olga Rouckova	(Czech Republic) Jiri Kopriva	No technician	Suzuki Samurai	Czech Samurais	87-96 Low Average
757	(France) Jean-Christophe Moine	(France) Lionel Jadot	No technician	Nissan Dessoude Patrol Y60	Thescrapmetalkings	87-96 Intermediate Average
758	(Netherlands) Jaap Bolk	(Netherlands) Marcel van Wort	No technician	Mitsubishi Pajero Evolution	Bolk Dakar Rallyteam	+97 Intermediate Average
759	(Netherlands) Bertus Altena	(Netherlands) Anton Veenstra	No technician	Volkswagen Taro	Altena Veenstra	87-96 Low Average
760	(Netherlands) Jeroen de Jong	(Germany) Ebberg Sven	No technician	Mitsubishi Pajero	Creative Action Classic Dakar Team	-86 Low Average
761	(Greece) Evangelos Bersis	(Greece) Fotios Koutsoumbos	No technician	Mitsubishi Pajero	R Team	+97 Intermediate Average
763	(Italy) Francesco Guasti	(Italy) Alessandro Guasti	No technician	Fiat Panda 4X4	Desert Endurance Motorsport	87-96 Low Average
764	(Italy) Marco Ernesto Leva	(Italy) Alexia Giugni	No technician	Fiat Panda 4X4	Desert Endurance Motorsport	87-96 Low Average
766	(Italy) David Bizzozero	(Italy) Pietro D’Agostino	No technician	Range Rover LHAB V2	R Team	-86 Intermediate Average
767	(Switzerland) Gian Enrico Dutschler	(Italy) Emanuele Spriano	No technician	Nissan Terrano 2	Tecnosport	+97 Intermediate Average
768	(Italy) Giuseppe Pozzi	(Italy) Matteo Giovanni Denti Filippo	No technician	Mercedes-Benz GE280	Tecnosport	-86 Moderate Average
773	(Spain) Asier Duarte Rodríguez	(Spain) Luis Barbero García	No technician	Nissan Patrol 260	All Bideak 4X4 Club	87-96 Moderate Average
775	(Spain) Lorenzo Fluxa Domene	(Spain) Sergi Giralt Valero	No technician	Toyota Land Cruiser KZJ95	LJS Racing Team	+97 Intermediate Average
776	(Italy) Paolo Bedeschi	(Italy) Daniele Bottallo	No technician	Toyota BJ71	Bedeschi-Bottallo	87-96 Intermediate Average
777	(Spain) Javier Burillo Téllez	(Spain) Manuel López Soler	No technician	Mitsubishi Pajero V6 3500	JBT Clásicos Racing	87-96 Intermediate Average
778	(Spain) Juan Morera	(Spain) Lidia Ruba	No technician	Toyota HDJ80	Toyota Classic	87-96 Moderate Average
779	(Italy) Elio Moro		No technician	withdrawn		
782	(Spain) Fernando Navarrete Perdices	(Spain) Cristobal Mora Reinosa	No technician	Fiat Panda L 4X4	Crazy Panda	87-96 Low Average
784	(Netherlands) Tom Kloosterman	(Netherlands) Niek Lichtenberg	No technician	Mitsubishi Pajero	Tom and Niek	87-96 Low Average
788	(Italy) Antonio Ricciari	(Italy) Simona Morosi	No technician	Mitsubishi Pajero V20	R Team	+97 Intermediate Average
789	(Venezuela) Rodrigo Ramírez	(Venezuela) Rogers Ramírez	No technician	Toyota KZJ95	Pedrega Team	+97 Intermediate Average
790	(Italy) Riccardo Garosci	(Italy) Rudy Briani	No technician	Nissan Terrano 2	Tecnosport	+97 Intermediate Average
791	(France) Christian Perrier	(France) Gérard Bouvet	No technician	Mitsubishi Pajero Ralliart	Ralliart Off Road Classic	87-96 High Average
792	(Italy) Lorenzo Piolini	(Italy) Franco Majno	No technician	Nissan Terrano	Tecnosport	+97 Intermediate Average
793	(Belgium) Erik Qvick	(Belgium) Jean-Marie Lurquin	No technician	Toyota Land Cruiser HDJ80	TH-Trucks Team	87-96 Moderate Average
795	(Spain) Miquel Martí Pierre	(Spain) Xavi Ribas	No technician	Toyota KZJ95	Pedrega Team	+97 Intermediate Average
796	(Italy) Alfredo Cavozza	(Italy) Adriano Furlotti	No technician	Nissan Terrano 1	Tecnosport	87-96 Moderate Average
801	(Switzerland) Mathieu Kurzen	(Switzerland) Alexandre Fatio	No technician	Mitsubishi Pajero 2	Geco Classic	87-96 Low Average
804	(France) Jean-Louis Malsergent	(France) Marie-Noëlle Malsergent	No technician	Toyota BJ73	Cangor Evasions	87-96 Moderate Average
805	(Spain) José Nicolás González	(Spain) Amadeo Roige Bragulat	No technician	Toyota KZJ90	Pedrega Team	+97 Intermediate Average
806	(Australia) Peter Schey	(Australia) Christopher Schey	No technician	Nissan Terrano	Aspen Pumps / Works Rally-Raid	87-96 Intermediate Average
900	(Slovakia) Radovan Kazarka	(Czech Republic) Josef Kalina	(Slovakia) Pavol Zachar	Tatra Puma T815	Tatra Buggyra ZM Racing	87-96 Low Average
901	(Netherlands) Adrianus Gerardus van Kasteren	(Netherlands) Herman Keijsers	(Netherlands) Thijs Heezen	DAF Double-Head	Classic Team DAF	-86 Moderate Average
902	(Belgium) Hugo Duisters	(Belgium) Remco de Vos	No technician	DAF NAT	Classic Team DAF	-86 Moderate Average
905	(France) Sandra Rivière	(France) Emmanuel Rivière	No technician	ALM ACMAT TPK	Ecurie Freres D'Armes	-86 Low Average
906	(Spain) Bautista Urbano Sancho	(Spain) Christian Almansa	(Spain) Albert Casabona Vilaseca	Pegaso 7222	TH-Trucks Team	-86 Low Average
907	(Spain) Juan Manuel González	(Spain) Rafa Muñoz Camara	(Spain) Jorge Toral	Mercedes 16-38	Pedrega Team	87-96 Low Average
909	(Italy) Marco Giannecchini	(Italy) Luca Macrini	(Italy) Francesco Maria Proietti	Iveco EuroCargo	R Team	87-96 Low Average
910	(France) Gildas Carnet	(France) Bruno Grilli	(France) Olivier Guillory	Mercedes 4X4	Team SSP	87-96 Moderate Average
912	(Italy) Stefano Brendolan	(Italy) Marco Corbetta	(Italy) Nicolo'Maria Mussetto	Iveco ACM 80-17	Desert Endurance Motorsport	87-96 Moderate Average
913	(Italy) Giuseppe Francesco Simonato	(Italy) Andrea Cadei	(Italy) Annunziata Del Gaudio	Iveco Magirus 150-16 ANW	Desert Endurance Motorsport	87-96 Moderate Average
914	(Spain) Francisco Del Pozo Martínez	(Spain) Juan Antonio Castillo Fernández	(Spain) Gustavo Castro Rodríguez	Pegaso 2223	Toyota Classic	87-96 Moderate Average
915	(Andorra) Jordi Ginesta	(France) Valentin Devic	(France) Yann Pellegrin	Renault Kerax	Team Boucou	+97 Moderate Average
916	(Spain) Juan Donatiu	(Brazil) Joao Fortes	(Spain) Joaquín Vilatarsana Martinez	MAN F90	Imnasa Racing Team	+97 Moderate Average
917	(Italy) Annunziata Del Gaudio			withdrawn		

== Stages ==
Stage	Date		Start	Finish	Total/Special
Prologue	Saturday	December 31, 2022	Sea Camp	Sea Camp	10 km / 10 km
1	Sunday	January 1, 2023	Sea Camp	Sea Camp	603 km / 368 km
2	Monday	January 2, 2023	Sea Camp	Al-'Ula	590 km / 431 km
3	Tuesday	January 3, 2023	Al-'Ula	Ha'il	669 km / 447 km^{1}
4	Wednesday	January 4, 2023	Ha'il	Ha'il	573 km / 425 km
5	Thursday	January 5, 2023	Ha'il	Ha'il	646 km / 375 km
6	Friday	January 6, 2023	Ha'il	Riyadh	917.74 km / 358 km^{2}
~~7~~	~~Saturday~~	~~January 7, 2023~~	~~Ad Dawadimi~~	~~Ad Dawadimi~~	~~641.47 km / 473 km~~^{2}
7	Saturday	January 7, 2023	Riyadh	Ad Dawadimi	861 km / 333 km^{2}
8	Sunday	January 8, 2023	Ad Dawadimi	Riyadh	822.94 km / 346 km^{2}
-	Monday	January 9, 2023	Riyadh		Rest day
9	Tuesday	January 10, 2023	Riyadh	Haradh	710 km / 439 km
10	Wednesday	January 11, 2023	Haradh	Shaybah	623 km / 114 km
11	Thursday	January 12, 2023	Shaybah	Empty Quarter	426 km / 275 km
12	Friday	January 13, 2023	Empty Quarter	Shaybah	375 km / 185 km
13	Saturday	January 14, 2023	Shaybah	Al Hofuf	669 km / 154 km
14	Sunday	January 15, 2023	Al Hofuf	Dammam	414 km / 136 km

- ^{1} Stage 3 was neutralized after 377 kilometers for all 4-wheel vehicles due to severe weather.
- ^{2} Due to flooding from the rain on January 3, a bivouac could not be established on time at Ad Dawadimi, prompting organizers to make route changes for stages 6–8. Stage 6 from Ha'il to Ad Dawadimi was reduced by roughly 100 kilometers, following which competitors would travel to a bivouac in Riyadh. The route from Ad Dawadimi to Riyadh originally scheduled to be stage 8 was moved up one day to become stage 7, while the original stage 7 route was moved to become stage 8. With the stage changes, stage 7 effectively became a "marathon" stage, where competitors are prohibited from receiving assistance from their teams during the overnight bivouac. Additionally, stage 7 was cancelled for the bikes and quads classes due to concerns for rider safety.

== Stage winners ==
Stage	Bikes	Quads	Cars	Light Proto (T3)	UTV (T4)	Trucks	Classics
Prologue	(Australia) Toby Price	(France) Alexandre Giroud	(Sweden) Mattias Ekström	(Spain) Cristina Gutiérrez	(Lithuania) Rokas Baciuška	(Czech Republic) Martin Macík	Did not participate
Stage 1	(United States) Ricky Brabec	(Argentina) Manuel Andújar	(Spain) Carlos Sainz	(Chile) Francisco López Contardo	(Poland) Eryk Goczał	(Czech Republic) Martin Macík	(France) Jérôme Galpin
Stage 2	(United States) Mason Klein	(France) Alexandre Giroud	(Qatar) Nasser Al-Attiyah	(United States) Mitch Guthrie	(Poland) Marek Goczał	(Czech Republic) Aleš Loprais	(Spain) Juan Morera
Stage 3	(Australia) Daniel Sanders	(France) Alexandre Giroud	(France) Guerlain Chicherit	(United States) Austin Jones	(Brazil) Cristiano Batista	(Netherlands) Gert Huzink	Stage cancelled
Stage 4	(Spain) Joan Barreda	(France) Alexandre Giroud	(France) Sébastien Loeb	(United States) Mitch Guthrie	(Poland) Eryk Goczał	(Czech Republic) Martin Macík	(Spain) Luis Pedrals Marot
Stage 5	(France) Adrien Van Beveren	(Argentina) Francisco Moreno Flores	(Qatar) Nasser Al-Attiyah	(United States) Seth Quintero	(Lithuania) Rokas Baciuška	(Czech Republic) Aleš Loprais	(Czech Republic) Ondřej Klymčiw
Stage 6	(Argentina) Luciano Benavides	(Argentina) Manuel Andújar	(Qatar) Nasser Al-Attiyah	(Belgium) Guillaume De Mévius	(Poland) Marek Goczał	(Netherlands) Mitchel van den Brink	(Spain) Carlos Santaolalla
Stage 7	Stage cancelled		(Saudi Arabia) Yazeed Al-Rajhi	(United States) Mitch Guthrie	(Lithuania) Rokas Baciuška	(Netherlands) Janus van Kasteren	(Italy) Paolo Bedeschi
Stage 8	(Botswana) Ross Branch	(Argentina) Manuel Andújar	(France) Sébastien Loeb	(Portugal) João Ferreira	(Argentina) Jeremías González Ferioli	(Czech Republic) Martin Macík	(Spain) Juan Morera
Stage 9	(Argentina) Luciano Benavides	(Lithuania) Laisvydas Kancius	(France) Sébastien Loeb	(Argentina) David Zille	(Poland) Eryk Goczał	(Netherlands) Janus van Kasteren	(Switzerland) Urbano Alfonso Gherardo Clerici
Stage 10	(Botswana) Ross Branch	(Brazil) Marcelo Medeiros	(France) Sébastien Loeb	(United States) Seth Quintero	(Spain) Gerard Farrés	(Netherlands) Pascal de Baar	(Switzerland) Urbano Alfonso Gherardo Clerici
Stage 11	(Argentina) Luciano Benavides	(Brazil) Marcelo Medeiros	(France) Sébastien Loeb	(Portugal) Ricardo Porém	(Lithuania) Rokas Baciuška	(Netherlands) Martin van den Brink	(Spain) Carlos Santaolalla
Stage 12	(Chile) José Ignacio Cornejo	(Brazil) Marcelo Medeiros	(France) Sébastien Loeb	(United States) Mitch Guthrie	(Poland) Michal Goczał	(Netherlands) Janus van Kasteren	(Switzerland) Urbano Alfonso Gherardo Clerici
Stage 13	(Argentina) Kevin Benavides	(Brazil) Marcelo Medeiros	(France) Sébastien Loeb	(United States) Mitch Guthrie	(Poland) Eryk Goczał	(Czech Republic) Martin Macík	(Switzerland) Urbano Alfonso Gherardo Clerici
Stage 14	(Argentina) Kevin Benavides	(Lithuania) Laisvydas Kancius	(France) Guerlain Chicherit	(Spain) Cristina Gutiérrez	(Spain) Carlos Vento Sánchez	(Lithuania) Vaidotas Paškevičius	Did not participate
Rally Winners	(Argentina) Kevin Benavides	(France) Alexandre Giroud	(Qatar) Nasser Al-Attiyah	(United States) Austin Jones	(Poland) Eryk Goczał	(Netherlands) Janus van Kasteren	(Spain) Juan Morera

== Stage results ==
=== Bikes ===
	Stage result					General classification				
Stage	Pos	Competitor	Make	Time	Gap	Pos	Competitor	Make	Time	Gap
Prologue	1	(Australia) Toby Price	KTM	00:08:22		1	(Australia) Toby Price	KTM	00:08:22	
Prologue	2	(Australia) Daniel Sanders	Gas Gas	00:08:23	00:00:01	2	(Australia) Daniel Sanders	Gas Gas	00:08:23	00:00:01
Prologue	3	(Botswana) Ross Branch	Hero	00:08:31	00:00:09	3	(Botswana) Ross Branch	Hero	00:08:31	00:00:09
Stage 1	1	(United States) Ricky Brabec	Honda	03:31:10		1	(United States) Ricky Brabec	Honda	04:14:10	
Stage 1	2	(Argentina) Kevin Benavides	KTM	03:31:51	00:00:44	2	(Argentina) Kevin Benavides	KTM	04:14:29	00:00:19
Stage 1	3	(United States) Mason Klein	KTM	03:31:51	00:00:44	3	(Australia) Toby Price	KTM	04:14:49	00:00:39
Stage 2	1	(United States) Mason Klein	KTM	05:23:04		1	(United States) Mason Klein	KTM	09:38:28	
Stage 2	2	(Germany) Sebastian Bühler	Hero	05:24:13	00:01:09	2	(Australia) Toby Price	KTM	09:40:09	00:01:41
Stage 2	3	(United States) Skyler Howes	Husqvarna	05:24:26	00:01:13	3	(Spain) Joan Barreda	Honda	09:40:31	00:02:03
Stage 3	1	(Australia) Daniel Sanders	Gas Gas	04:24:15		1	(Australia) Daniel Sanders	Gas Gas	14:05:38	
Stage 3	2	(United States) Skyler Howes	Husqvarna	04:30:34	00:06:19	2	(United States) Mason Klein	KTM	14:09:42	00:04:04
Stage 3	3	(United States) Mason Klein	KTM	04:31:14	00:06:59	3	(Argentina) Kevin Benavides	KTM	14:12:31	00:06:53
Stage 4	1	(Spain) Joan Barreda	Honda	04:28:18		1	(Australia) Daniel Sanders	Gas Gas	18:40:03	
Stage 4	2	(Chile) Pablo Quintanilla	Honda	04:28:34	00:00:16	2	(United States) Skyler Howes	Husqvarna	18:43:36	00:03:33
Stage 4	3	(United States) Skyler Howes	Husqvarna	04:29:23	00:01:05	3	(Argentina) Kevin Benavides	KTM	18:44:08	00:04:05
Stage 5	1	(France) Adrien Van Beveren	Honda	04:27:28		1	(United States) Skyler Howes	Husqvarna	23:16:37	
Stage 5	2	(Chile) José Ignacio Cornejo	Honda	04:27:41	00:00:13	2	(Australia) Toby Price	KTM	23:18:44	00:02:07
Stage 5	3	(Australia) Toby Price	KTM	04:31:24	00:03:56	3	(Argentina) Kevin Benavides	KTM	23:21:53	00:05:16
Stage 6	1	(Argentina) Luciano Benavides	Husqvarna	03:14:19		1	(United States) Skyler Howes	Husqvarna	26:31:52	
Stage 6	2	(United States) Skyler Howes	Husqvarna	03:15:15	00:00:56	2	(Australia) Toby Price	KTM	26:35:23	00:03:31
Stage 6	3	(Australia) Toby Price	KTM	03:16:39	00:02:20	3	(Argentina) Kevin Benavides	KTM	26:38:53	00:07:01
Stage 7	Stage cancelled									
Stage 8	1	(Botswana) Ross Branch	Hero	03:46:18		1	(United States) Skyler Howes	Husqvarna	30:33:16	
Stage 8	2	(Australia) Daniel Sanders	Gas Gas	03:49:33	00:03:15	2	(Argentina) Kevin Benavides	KTM	30:34:29	00:01:13
Stage 8	3	(United States) Mason Klein	KTM	03:49:51	00:03:33	3	(United States) Mason Klein	KTM	30:34:29	00:01:13
Stage 9	1	(Argentina) Luciano Benavides	Husqvarna	03:18:44		1	(United States) Skyler Howes	Husqvarna	33:55:57	
Stage 9	2	(Australia) Toby Price	KTM	03:19:46	00:01:02	2	(Australia) Toby Price	KTM	33:56:00	00:00:03
Stage 9	3	(United States) Skyler Howes	Husqvarna	03:21:41	00:02:57	3	(Argentina) Kevin Benavides	KTM	34:01:06	00:05:09
Stage 10	1	(Botswana) Ross Branch	Hero	01:44:00		1	(Argentina) Kevin Benavides	KTM	35:46:06	
Stage 10	2	(France) Adrien Van Beveren	Honda	01:44:21	00:00:21	2	(United States) Skyler Howes	Husqvarna	35:47:35	00:01:29
Stage 10	3	(South Africa) Michael Docherty	Husqvarna	01:44:30	00:00:30	3	(Australia) Toby Price	KTM	35:48:16	00:02:10
Stage 11	1	(Argentina) Luciano Benavides	Husqvarna	02:57:59		1	(United States) Skyler Howes	Husqvarna	38:47:43	
Stage 11	2	(Australia) Daniel Sanders	Gas Gas	02:59:37	00:01:38	2	(Australia) Toby Price	KTM	38:48:11	00:00:28
Stage 11	3	(Australia) Toby Price	KTM	02:59:55	00:01:56	3	(Argentina) Kevin Benavides	KTM	38:50:27	00:02:44
Stage 12	1	(Chile) José Ignacio Cornejo	Honda	01:57:27		1	(Australia) Toby Price	KTM	40:47:36	
Stage 12	2	(Australia) Daniel Sanders	Gas Gas	01:58:16	00:00:49	2	(United States) Skyler Howes	Husqvarna	40:48:04	00:00:28
Stage 12	3	(Australia) Toby Price	KTM	01:59:25	00:01:58	3	(Argentina) Kevin Benavides	KTM	40:50:16	00:02:40
Stage 13	1	(Argentina) Kevin Benavides	KTM	02:21:47		1	(Australia) Toby Price	KTM	43:11:51	
Stage 13	2	(South Africa) Michael Docherty	Husqvarna	02:22:14	00:00:27	2	(Argentina) Kevin Benavides	KTM	43:12:03	00:00:12
Stage 13	3	(Argentina) Luciano Benavides	Husqvarna	02:22:44	00:00:57	3	(United States) Skyler Howes	Husqvarna	43:13:22	00:01:31
Stage 14	1	(Argentina) Kevin Benavides	KTM	01:15:17		1	(Argentina) Kevin Benavides	KTM	44:27:20	
Stage 14	2	(Australia) Toby Price	KTM	01:16:12	00:00:55	2	(Australia) Toby Price	KTM	44:28:03	00:00:43
Stage 14	3	(Chile) Pablo Quintanilla	Honda	01:18:32	00:03:15	3	(United States) Skyler Howes	Husqvarna	44:32:24	00:05:04

=== Quads ===
	Stage result					General classification				
Stage	Pos	Competitor	Make	Time	Gap	Pos	Competitor	Make	Time	Gap
Prologue	1	(France) Alexandre Giroud	Yamaha	00:08:50		1	(France) Alexandre Giroud	Yamaha	00:08:50	
Prologue	2	(Brazil) Marcelo Medeiros	Yamaha	00:08:51	00:00:01	2	(Brazil) Marcelo Medeiros	Yamaha	00:08:51	00:00:01
Prologue	3	(Spain) Daniel Vila Vaques	Yamaha	00:09:02	00:00:12	3	(Spain) Daniel Vila Vaques	Yamaha	00:09:02	00:00:12
Stage 1	1	(Argentina) Manuel Andújar	Yamaha	04:10:34		1	(France) Alexandre Giroud	Yamaha	04:55:28	
Stage 1	2	(France) Alexandre Giroud	Yamaha	04:11:18	00:00:44	2	(Argentina) Manuel Andújar	Yamaha	04:55:49	00:00:21
Stage 1	3	(Argentina) Francisco Moreno Flores	Yamaha	04:21:23	00:10:49	3	(Brazil) Marcelo Medeiros	Yamaha	05:08:20	00:12:52
Stage 2	1	(France) Alexandre Giroud	Yamaha	06:21:06		1	(France) Alexandre Giroud	Yamaha	11:16:34	
Stage 2	2	(United States) Pablo Copetti	Yamaha	06:24:41	00:03:35	2	(Argentina) Manuel Andújar	Yamaha	11:25:02	00:08:28
Stage 2	3	(Argentina) Francisco Moreno Flores	Yamaha	06:26:35	00:05:29	3	(United States) Pablo Copetti	Yamaha	11:34:16	00:17:42
Stage 3	1	(France) Alexandre Giroud	Yamaha	05:40:44		1	(France) Alexandre Giroud	Yamaha	16:57:18	
Stage 3	2	(Argentina) Francisco Moreno Flores	Yamaha	05:57:46	00:17:02	2	(Argentina) Francisco Moreno Flores	Yamaha	17:32:49	00:35:31
Stage 3	3	(Slovakia) Juraj Varga	Yamaha	05:59:32	00:18:48	3	(United States) Pablo Copetti	Yamaha	17:46:05	00:48:47
Stage 4	1	(France) Alexandre Giroud	Yamaha	05:52:17		1	(France) Alexandre Giroud	Yamaha	22:49:35	
Stage 4	2	(Argentina) Manuel Andújar	Yamaha	05:57:03	00:04:46	2	(Argentina) Francisco Moreno Flores	Yamaha	23:36:39	00:47:04
Stage 4	3	(Lithuania) Laisvydas Kancius	Yamaha	06:02:51	00:10:34	3	(Argentina) Manuel Andújar	Yamaha	23:57:47	01:08:12
Stage 5	1	(Argentina) Francisco Moreno Flores	Yamaha	05:49:21		1	(France) Alexandre Giroud	Yamaha	28:46:12	
Stage 5	2	(United States) Pablo Copetti	Yamaha	05:50:14	00:00:53	2	(Argentina) Francisco Moreno Flores	Yamaha	29:26:00	00:39:48
Stage 5	3	(Brazil) Marcelo Medeiros	Yamaha	05:50:45	00:01:24	3	(Lithuania) Laisvydas Kancius	Yamaha	29:58:51	01:12:39
Stage 6	1	(Argentina) Manuel Andújar	Yamaha	04:08:25		1	(France) Alexandre Giroud	Yamaha	32:58:54	
Stage 6	2	(France) Alexandre Giroud	Yamaha	04:12:42	00:04:17	2	(Argentina) Francisco Moreno Flores	Yamaha	33:41:51	00:42:57
Stage 6	3	(Argentina) Francisco Moreno Flores	Yamaha	04:15:51	00:07:26	3	(United States) Pablo Copetti	Yamaha	34:22:37	01:23:43
Stage 7	Stage cancelled									
Stage 8	1	(Argentina) Manuel Andújar	Yamaha	04:56:05		1	(France) Alexandre Giroud	Yamaha	37:57:04	
Stage 8	2	(France) Alexandre Giroud	Yamaha	04:58:10	00:02:05	2	(Argentina) Manuel Andújar	Yamaha	39:38:41	01:41:37
Stage 8	3	(Brazil) Marcelo Medeiros	Yamaha	05:08:00	00:11:55	3	(United States) Pablo Copetti	Yamaha	39:39:16	01:42:12
Stage 9	1	(Lithuania) Laisvydas Kancius	Yamaha	04:20:14		1	(France) Alexandre Giroud	Yamaha	42:25:05	
Stage 9	2	(Argentina) Francisco Moreno Flores	Yamaha	04:24:37	00:04:23	2	(Argentina) Francisco Moreno Flores	Yamaha	43:44:44	01:19:39
Stage 9	3	(Brazil) Marcelo Medeiros	Yamaha	04:25:36	00:05:22	3	(United States) Pablo Copetti	Yamaha	44:06:14	01:41:09
Stage 10	1	(Brazil) Marcelo Medeiros	Yamaha	02:04:28		1	(France) Alexandre Giroud	Yamaha	44:35:00	
Stage 10	2	(Argentina) Manuel Andújar	Yamaha	02:05:36	00:01:08	2	(Argentina) Francisco Moreno Flores	Yamaha	45:52:56	01:17:56
Stage 10	3	(Chile) Giovanni Enrico	Yamaha	02:07:23	00:02:55	3	(Argentina) Manuel Andújar	Yamaha	46:13:44	01:38:44
Stage 11	1	(Brazil) Marcelo Medeiros	Yamaha	03:50:47		1	(France) Alexandre Giroud	Yamaha	48:31:56	
Stage 11	2	(France) Alexandre Giroud	Yamaha	03:56:56	00:06:09	2	(Argentina) Francisco Moreno Flores	Yamaha	49:52:19	01:20:23
Stage 11	3	(Argentina) Francisco Moreno Flores	Yamaha	03:59:23	00:08:36	3	(United States) Pablo Copetti	Yamaha	50:39:14	02:07:18
Stage 12	1	(Brazil) Marcelo Medeiros	Yamaha	02:37:04		1	(France) Alexandre Giroud	Yamaha	51:50:39	
Stage 12	2	(Chile) Giovanni Enrico	Yamaha	02:41:11	00:04:07	2	(Argentina) Francisco Moreno Flores	Yamaha	52:34:39	00:44:00
Stage 12	3	(Argentina) Francisco Moreno Flores	Yamaha	02:42:20	00:05:16	3	(United States) Pablo Copetti	Yamaha	53:53:09	02:02:30
Stage 13	1	(Brazil) Marcelo Medeiros	Yamaha	02:55:48		1	(France) Alexandre Giroud	Yamaha	54:53:18	
Stage 13	2	(Chile) Giovanni Enrico	Yamaha	02:57:23	00:01:35	2	(Argentina) Francisco Moreno Flores	Yamaha	55:33:38	00:40:20
Stage 13	3	(Argentina) Francisco Moreno Flores	Yamaha	02:58:59	00:03:11	3	(United States) Pablo Copetti	Yamaha	56:55:04	02:01:46
Stage 14	1	(Lithuania) Laisvydas Kancius	Yamaha	01:36:16		1	(France) Alexandre Giroud	Yamaha	56:44:30	
Stage 14	2	(United States) Pablo Copetti	Yamaha	01:42:21	00:06:05	2	(Argentina) Francisco Moreno Flores	Yamaha	57:27:41	00:43:11
Stage 14	3	(Brazil) Marcelo Medeiros	Yamaha	01:44:27	00:08:11	3	(United States) Pablo Copetti	Yamaha	58:37:25	01:52:55

=== Cars ===
	Stage result					General classification				
Stage	Pos	Competitor	Make	Time	Gap	Pos	Competitor	Make	Time	Gap
Prologue	1	(Sweden) Mattias Ekström	Audi	00:08:00		1	(Sweden) Mattias Ekström	Audi	00:08:00	
Prologue	2	(France) Sébastien Loeb	Prodrive	00:08:01	00:00:01	2	(France) Sébastien Loeb	Prodrive	00:08:01	00:00:01
Prologue	3	(France) Stéphane Peterhansel	Audi	00:08:11	00:00:11	3	(France) Stéphane Peterhansel	Audi	00:08:11	00:00:11
Stage 1	1	(Spain) Carlos Sainz	Audi	03:20:41		1	(Spain) Carlos Sainz	Audi	03:28:55	
Stage 1	2	(France) Sébastien Loeb	Prodrive	03:21:04	00:00:23	2	(France) Sébastien Loeb	Prodrive	03:29:05	00:00:10
Stage 1	3	(Saudi Arabia) Yazeed Al-Rajhi	Toyota	03:22:40	00:01:59	3	(Saudi Arabia) Yazeed Al-Rajhi	Toyota	03:30:56	00:02:01
Stage 2	1	(Qatar) Nasser Al-Attiyah	Toyota	05:00:26		1	(Spain) Carlos Sainz	Audi	08:34:26	
Stage 2	2	(Netherlands) Erik Van Loon	Toyota	05:00:40	00:00:14	2	(Qatar) Nasser Al-Attiyah	Toyota	08:36:38	00:02:12
Stage 2	3	(Spain) Carlos Sainz	Audi	05:05:31	00:05:05	3	(France) Mathieu Serradori	Century	08:59:21	00:24:55
Stage 3	1	(France) Guerlain Chicherit	Prodrive	03:22:57		1	(Qatar) Nasser Al-Attiyah	Toyota	12:20:33	
Stage 3	2	(South Africa) Henk Lategan	Toyota	03:26:23	00:03:26	2	(Saudi Arabia) Yazeed Al-Rajhi	Toyota	12:33:53	00:13:20
Stage 3	3	(Argentina) Orlando Terranova	Prodrive	03:28:01	00:05:04	3	(France) Stéphane Peterhansel	Audi	12:41:18	00:20:45
Stage 4	1	(France) Sébastien Loeb	Prodrive	04:11:34		1	(Qatar) Nasser Al-Attiyah	Toyota	16:34:13	
Stage 4	2	(France) Stéphane Peterhansel	Audi	04:11:47	00:00:13	2	(Saudi Arabia) Yazeed Al-Rajhi	Toyota	16:52:31	00:18:18
Stage 4	3	(Spain) Carlos Sainz	Audi	04:13:24	00:01:50	3	(France) Stéphane Peterhansel	Audi	16:53:05	00:18:52
Stage 5	1	(Qatar) Nasser Al-Attiyah	Toyota	04:13:23		1	(Qatar) Nasser Al-Attiyah	Toyota	20:47:36	
Stage 5	2	(Spain) Carlos Sainz	Audi	04:15:20	00:01:57	2	(France) Stéphane Peterhansel	Audi	21:20:12	00:22:36
Stage 5	3	(France) Stéphane Peterhansel	Audi	04:17:07	00:03:44	3	(Saudi Arabia) Yazeed Al-Rajhi	Toyota	21:14:37	00:27:01
Stage 6	1	(Qatar) Nasser Al-Attiyah	Toyota	03:13:12		1	(Qatar) Nasser Al-Attiyah	Toyota	24:00:48	
Stage 6	2	(France) Sébastien Loeb	Prodrive	03:16:41	00:03:29	2	(South Africa) Henk Lategan	Toyota	25:07:38	01:06:50
Stage 6	3	(South Africa) Henk Lategan	Toyota	03:22:04	00:08:52	3	(Brazil) Lucas Moraes	Toyota	25:14:07	01:13:19
Stage 7	1	(Saudi Arabia) Yazeed Al-Rajhi	Toyota	03:06:23		1	(Qatar) Nasser Al-Attiyah	Toyota	27:26:23	
Stage 7	2	(Lithuania) Vaidotas Žala	Prodrive	03:15:17	00:08:54	2	(South Africa) Henk Lategen	Toyota	28:27:27	01:01:04
Stage 7	3	(France) Guerlain Chicherit	Prodrive	03:16:38	00:10:15	3	(Brazil) Lucas Moraes	Toyota	28:37:47	01:11:24
Stage 8	1	(France) Sébastien Loeb	Prodrive	03:34:24		1	(Qatar) Nasser Al-Attiyah	Toyota	31:02:58	
Stage 8	2	(Qatar) Nasser Al-Attiyah	Toyota	03:36:35	00:02:11	2	(South Africa) Henk Lategen	Toyota	32:06:44	01:03:46
Stage 8	3	(Spain) Carlos Sainz	Audi	03:37:55	00:03:31	3	(Brazil) Lucas Moraes	Toyota	32:23:20	01:20:22
Stage 9	1	(France) Sébastien Loeb	Prodrive	03:07:24		1	(Qatar) Nasser Al-Attiyah	Toyota	34:19:20	
Stage 9	2	(Lithuania) Vaidotas Žala	Prodrive	03:08:21	00:00:57	2	(Brazil) Lucas Moraes	Toyota	35:41:17	01:21:57
Stage 9	3	(France) Guerlain Chicherit	Prodrive	03:09:32	00:02:08	3	(France) Sébastien Loeb	Prodrive	36:02:28	01:43:08
Stage 10	1	(France) Sébastien Loeb	Prodrive	01:48:32		1	(Qatar) Nasser Al-Attiyah	Toyota	36:16:37	
Stage 10	2	(Sweden) Mattias Ekström	Audi	01:51:36	00:03:04	2	(Brazil) Lucas Moraes	Toyota	37:35:11	01:21:34
Stage 10	3	(Brazil) Lucas Moraes	Toyota	01:53:54	00:05:22	3	(France) Sébastien Loeb	Prodrive	37:51:00	01:37:23
Stage 11	1	(France) Sébastien Loeb	Prodrive	02:56:14		1	(Qatar) Nasser Al-Attiyah	Toyota	39:16:33	
Stage 11	2	(France) Guerlain Chicherit	Prodrive	02:58:30	00:02:16	2	(Brazil) Lucas Moraes	Toyota	40:37:37	01:21:04
Stage 11	3	(Sweden) Mattias Ekström	Audi	02:58:40	00:02:26	3	(France) Sébastien Loeb	Prodrive	40:47:14	01:30:41
Stage 12	1	(France) Sébastien Loeb	Prodrive	01:56:21		1	(Qatar) Nasser Al-Attiyah	Toyota	41:16:25	
Stage 12	2	(Sweden) Mattias Ekström	Audi	01:59:40	00:03:19	2	(France) Sébastien Loeb	Prodrive	42:43:35	01:27:10
Stage 12	3	(Qatar) Nasser Al-Attiyah	Toyota	01:59:52	00:03:31	3	(Brazil) Lucas Moraes	Toyota	42:45:36	01:29:11
Stage 13	1	(France) Sébastien Loeb	Prodrive	02:26:17		1	(Qatar) Nasser Al-Attiyah	Toyota	43:48:10	
Stage 13	2	(Qatar) Nasser Al-Attiyah	Toyota	02:31:45	00:05:28	2	(France) Sébastien Loeb	Prodrive	45:09:52	01:21:42
Stage 13	3	(Sweden) Mattias Ekström	Audi	02:32:48	00:06:31	3	(Brazil) Lucas Moraes	Toyota	45:24:00	01:35:50
Stage 14	1	(France) Guerlain Chicherit	Prodrive	01:09:24		1	(Qatar) Nasser Al-Attiyah	Toyota	45:03:15	
Stage 14	2	(Sweden) Mattias Ekström	Audi	01:11:00	00:01:36	2	(France) Sébastien Loeb	Prodrive	46:24:04	01:20:49
Stage 14	3	(Argentina) Sebastián Halpern	Mini	01:11:17	00:01:53	3	(Brazil) Lucas Moraes	Toyota	46:41:46	01:38:31

=== Light Prototypes (T3) ===
	Stage result					General classification				
Stage	Pos	Competitor	Make	Time	Gap	Pos	Competitor	Make	Time	Gap
Prologue	1	(Spain) Cristina Gutiérrez	Can-Am	00:08:49		1	(Spain) Cristina Gutiérrez	Can-Am	00:08:49	
Prologue	2	(United States) Seth Quintero	Can-Am	00:08:51	00:00:02	2	(United States) Seth Quintero	Can-Am	00:08:51	00:00:02
Prologue	3	(Belgium) Guillaume De Mévius	OT3	00:08:53	00:00:04	3	(Belgium) Guillaume De Mévius	OT3	00:08:53	00:00:04
Stage 1	1	(Chile) Francisco López Contardo	Can-Am	03:48:36		1	' (Chile) Francisco López Contardo	Can-Am	03:57:40	
Stage 1	2	(Belgium) Guillaume De Mévius	OT3	03:50:36	00:02:00	2	(Belgium) Guillaume De Mévius	OT3	03:59:29	00:01:49
Stage 1	3	(United States) Seth Quintero	Can-Am	03:51:56	00:03:20	3	(United States) Seth Quintero	Can-Am	04:00:47	00:03:07
Stage 2	1	(United States) Mitch Guthrie	MCE-5	05:38:31		1	' (Chile) Francisco López Contardo	Can-Am	09:37:36	
Stage 2	2	(Chile) Francisco López Contardo	Can-Am	05:39:56	00:01:25	2	(United States) Seth Quintero	Can-Am	09:46:19	00:08:43
Stage 2	3	(United States) Seth Quintero	Can-Am	05:45:32	00:07:01	3	(Belgium) Guillaume De Mévius	OT3	09:46:29	00:08:53
Stage 3	1	(United States) Austin Jones	Can-Am	04:05:03		1	(United States) Seth Quintero	Can-Am	13:52:06	
Stage 3	2	(United States) Seth Quintero	Can-Am	04:05:47	00:00:44	2	(Belgium) Guillaume De Mévius	OT3	13:53:07	00:01:01
Stage 3	3	(Belgium) Guillaume De Mévius	OT3	04:06:38	00:01:35	3	(United States) Mitch Guthrie	MCE-5	13:57:52	00:05:46
Stage 4	1	(United States) Mitch Guthrie	MCE-5	05:01:55		1	(United States) Mitch Guthrie	MCE-5	18:59:47	
Stage 4	2	(Portugal) João Ferreira	Yamaha	05:07:44	00:05:49	2	(Belgium) Guillaume De Mévius	OT3	19:01:16	00:01:29
Stage 4	3	(Belgium) Guillaume De Mévius	OT3	05:08:09	00:06:14	3	(United States) Austin Jones	Can-Am	19:11:18	00:11:31
Stage 5	1	(United States) Seth Quintero	Can-Am	04:59:55		1	(Belgium) Guillaume De Mévius	OT3	24:15:39	
Stage 5	2	(Chile) Francisco López Contardo	Can-Am	05:04:42	00:04:47	2	(United States) Austin Jones	Can-Am	24:22:59	00:07:20
Stage 5	3	(United States) Austin Jones	Can-Am	05:11:41	00:11:46	3	(United States) Seth Quintero	Can-Am	25:21:28	01:05:49
Stage 6	1	(Belgium) Guillaume De Mévius	OT3	03:39:43		1	(Belgium) Guillaume De Mévius	OT3	27:55:22	
Stage 6	2	(United States) Austin Jones	Can-Am	03:41:22	00:01:39	2	(United States) Austin Jones	Can-Am	28:04:21	00:08:59
Stage 6	3	(United States) Seth Quintero	Can-Am	03:42:09	00:02:26	3	(United States) Seth Quintero	Can-Am	29:03:37	01:08:15
Stage 7	1	(United States) Mitch Guthrie	MCE-5	03:39:37		1	(Belgium) Guillaume De Mévius	OT3	31:43:12	
Stage 7	2	(Chile) Francisco López Contardo	Can-Am	03:41:22	00:01:45	2	(United States) Austin Jones	Can-Am	31:51:41	00:08:29
Stage 7	3	(Portugal) João Ferreira	Yamaha	03:41:35	00:01:58	3	(United States) Seth Quintero	Can-Am	32:46:07	01:02:55
Stage 8	1	(Portugal) João Ferreira	Yamaha	04:11:36		1	(Belgium) Guillaume De Mévius	OT3	36:03:09	
Stage 8	2	(Chile) Francisco López Contardo	Can-Am	04:11:53	00:00:17	2	(United States) Austin Jones	Can-Am	36:06:28	00:03:19
Stage 8	3	(United States) Mitch Guthrie	MCE-5	04:13:38	00:02:02	3	(United States) Seth Quintero	Can-Am	37:05:34	01:02:25
Stage 9	1	(Argentina) David Zille	Can-Am	03:38:00		1	(Belgium) Guillaume De Mévius	OT3	39:41:11	
Stage 9	2	(Belgium) Guillaume De Mévius	OT3	03:38:02	00:00:02	2	(United States) Austin Jones	Can-Am	39:53:54	00:12:43
Stage 9	3	(United States) Mitch Guthrie	MCE-5	03:38:12	00:00:12	3	(United States) Seth Quintero	Can-Am	40:54:23	01:13:12
Stage 10	1	(United States) Seth Quintero	Can-Am	01:55:17		1	(Belgium) Guillaume De Mévius	OT3	41:45:58	
Stage 10	2	(Chile) Ignacio Casale	Yamaha	01:55:54	00:00:37	2	(United States) Austin Jones	Can-Am	41:53:46	00:07:48
Stage 10	3	(Portugal) Helder Rodrigues	Can-Am	01:58:03	00:02:46	3	(United States) Seth Quintero	Can-Am	42:49:40	01:03:42
Stage 11	1	(Portugal) Ricardo Porém	Yamaha	03:19:11		1	(United States) Austin Jones	Can-Am	45:19:15	
Stage 11	2	(Portugal) João Ferreira	Yamaha	03:19:31	00:00:20	2	(United States) Seth Quintero	Can-Am	46:15:09	00:55:54
Stage 11	3	(Chile) Ignacio Casale	Yamaha	03:19:33	00:00:22	3	(Belgium) Guillaume De Mévius	OT3	46:47:34	01:28:19
Stage 12	1	(United States) Mitch Guthrie	MCE-5	02:17:11		1	(United States) Austin Jones	Can-Am	47:39:47	
Stage 12	2	(Chile) Ignacio Casale	Yamaha	02:17:40	00:00:29	2	(United States) Seth Quintero	Can-Am	48:44:24	01:04:37
Stage 12	3	(Belgium) Guillaume De Mévius	OT3	02:18:03	00:00:52	3	(Belgium) Guillaume De Mévius	OT3	49:05:37	01:25:50
Stage 13	1	(United States) Mitch Guthrie	MCE-5	02:41:08		1	(United States) Austin Jones	Can-Am	50:31:59	
Stage 13	2	(Chile) Ignacio Casale	Yamaha	02:41:58	00:00:50	2	(United States) Seth Quintero	Can-Am	51:26:29	00:54:30
Stage 13	3	(United States) Seth Quintero	Can-Am	02:42:05	00:00:57	3	(Belgium) Guillaume De Mévius	OT3	52:05:27	01:33:28
Stage 14	1	(Spain) Cristina Gutiérrez	Can-Am	01:18:01		1	(United States) Austin Jones	Can-Am	51:55:53	
Stage 14	2	(Chile) Ignacio Casale	Yamaha	01:18:59	00:00:58	2	(United States) Seth Quintero	Can-Am	52:47:58	00:52:05
Stage 14	3	(Argentina) David Zille	Can-Am	01:19:32	00:01:31	3	(Belgium) Guillaume De Mévius	OT3	53:31:35	01:35:42

=== SSVs (T4) ===
	Stage result					General classification				
Stage	Pos	Competitor	Make	Time	Gap	Pos	Competitor	Make	Time	Gap
Prologue	1	(Lithuania) Rokas Baciuška	Can-Am	00:09:06		1	(Lithuania) Rokas Baciuška	Can-Am	00:09:06	
Prologue	2	(Brazil) Cristiano Batista	Can-Am	00:09:08	00:00:02	2	(Brazil) Cristiano Batista	Can-Am	00:09:08	00:00:02
Prologue	3	(Spain) Gerard Farrés	Can-Am	00:09:14	00:00:08	3	(Spain) Gerard Farrés	Can-Am	00:09:14	00:00:08
Stage 1	1	(Poland) Eryk Goczał	Can-Am	04:02:44		1	(Poland) Eryk Goczał	Can-Am	04:02:44	
Stage 1	2	(Spain) Pau Navarro	Can-Am	04:04:10	00:01:26	2	(Spain) Pau Navarro	Can-Am	04:13:29	00:01:31
Stage 1	3	(Poland) Michał Goczał	Can-Am	04:04:35	00:01:51	3	(Poland) Michał Goczał	Can-Am	04:13:49	00:01:51
Stage 2	1	(Poland) Marek Goczał	Can-Am	05:45:31		1	(Poland) Marek Goczał	Can-Am	10:07:18	
Stage 2	2	(Argentina) Jeremías González Ferioli	Can-Am	05:54:59	00:09:28	2	(Brazil) Rodrigo Luppi De Oliveira	Can-Am	10:13:02	00:05:44
Stage 2	3	(Brazil) Rodrigo Luppi De Oliveira	Can-Am	05:56:34	00:11:03	3	(Argentina) Jeremías González Ferioli	Can-Am	10:14:15	00:06:57
Stage 3	1	(Brazil) Cristiano Batista	Can-Am	04:21:05		1	(Poland) Marek Goczał	Can-Am	14:30:03	
Stage 3	2	(Poland) Marek Goczał	Can-Am	04:22:45	00:01:40	2	(Brazil) Rodrigo Luppi De Oliveira	Can-Am	14:39:39	00:09:36
Stage 3	3	(Lithuania) Rokas Baciuška	Can-Am	04:25:39	00:04:34	3	(Poland) Eryk Goczał	Can-Am	15:01:18	00:31:15
Stage 4	1	(Poland) Eryk Goczał	Can-Am	05:18:41		1	(Brazil) Rodrigo Luppi De Oliveira	Can-Am	20:05:55	
Stage 4	2	(Spain) Gerard Farrés	Can-Am	05:22:10	00:03:29	2	(Poland) Eryk Goczał	Can-Am	20:19:59	00:14:04
Stage 4	3	(Poland) Michał Goczał	Can-Am	05:25:31	00:06:50	3	(Lithuania) Rokas Baciuška	Can-Am	20:30:52	00:24:57
Stage 5	1	(Lithuania) Rokas Baciuška	Can-Am	05:02:52		1	(Brazil) Rodrigo Luppi De Oliveira	Can-Am	25:13:20	
Stage 5	2	(Brazil) Cristiano Batista	Can-Am	05:02:57	00:00:05	2	(Poland) Eryk Goczał	Can-Am	25:30:05	00:16:45
Stage 5	3	(Saudi Arabia) Yasir Seaidan	Can-Am	05:03:58	00:01:06	3	(Lithuania) Rokas Baciuška	Can-Am	25:33:44	00:20:24
Stage 6	1	(Poland) Marek Goczał	Can-Am	03:43:18		1	(Brazil) Rodrigo Luppi De Olivera	Can-Am	29:02:55	
Stage 6	2	(Poland) Michal Goczał	Can-Am	03:45:44	00:02:26	2	(Lithuania) Rokas Baciuška	Can-Am	29:23:12	00:20:17
Stage 6	3	(Spain) Gerard Farrés	Can-Am	03:48:22	00:05:04	3	(Poland) Marek Goczał	Can-Am	29:25:27	00:22:32
Stage 7	1	(Lithuania) Rokas Baciuška	Can-Am	03:45:34		1	(Lithuania) Rokas Baciuška	Can-Am	33:08:46	
Stage 7	2	(Brazil) Cristiano Batista	Can-Am	03:46:37	00:01:03	2	(Poland) Marek Goczał	Can-Am	33:14:28	00:05:42
Stage 7	3	(Saudi Arabia) Yasir Seaidan	Can-Am	03:48:25	00:02:51	3	(Poland) Eryk Goczał	Can-Am	33:15:09	00:06:23
Stage 8	1	(Argentina) Jeremías González Ferioli	Can-Am	04:16:18		1	(Lithuania) Rokas Baciuška	Can-Am	37:33:31	
Stage 8	2	(Saudi Arabia) Yasir Seaidan	Can-Am	04:19:27	00:03:09	2	(Poland) Marek Goczał	Can-Am	37:38:05	00:04:34
Stage 8	3	(Spain) Gerard Farrés	Can-Am	04:19:36	00:03:18	3	(Poland) Eryk Goczał	Can-Am	37:39:19	00:05:48
Stage 9	1	(Poland) Eryk Goczał	Can-Am	03:42:20		1	(Lithuania) Rokas Baciuška	Can-Am	41:16:37	
Stage 9	2	(Lithuania) Rokas Baciuška	Can-Am	03:43:06	00:01:26	2	(Poland) Eryk Goczał	Can-Am	41:21:39	00:05:02
Stage 9	3	(Argentina) Jeremías González Ferioli	Can-Am	03:44:48	00:02:28	3	(Spain) Gerard Farrés	Can-Am	41:25:54	00:09:17
Stage 10	1	(Spain) Gerard Farrés	Can-Am	01:58:22		1	(Lithuania) Rokas Baciuška	Can-Am	43:17:29	
Stage 10	2	(Poland) Marek Goczał	Can-Am	01:59:17	00:00:55	2	(Poland) Eryk Goczał	Can-Am	43:21:09	00:03:40
Stage 10	3	(Poland) Eryk Goczał	Can-Am	01:59:30	00:01:08	3	(Spain) Gerard Farrés	Can-Am	43:24:16	00:06:47
Stage 11	1	(Lithuania) Rokas Baciuška	Can-Am	03:25:13		1	(Lithuania) Rokas Baciuška	Can-Am	46:42:42	
Stage 11	2	(Poland) Eryk Goczał	Can-Am	03:25:50	00:00:37	2	(Poland) Eryk Goczał	Can-Am	46:46:59	00:04:17
Stage 11	3	(Poland) Marek Goczał	Can-Am	03:27:51	00:02:38	3	(Poland) Marek Goczał	Can-Am	46:57:00	00:14:18
Stage 12	1	(Poland) Michal Goczał	Can-Am	02:19:07		1	(Lithuania) Rokas Baciuška	Can-Am	49:02:02	
Stage 12	2	(Lithuania) Rokas Baciuška	Can-Am	02:19:20	00:00:13	2	(Poland) Eryk Goczał	Can-Am	49:09:45	00:07:43
Stage 12	3	(Poland) Marek Goczał	Can-Am	02:21:45	00:02:38	3	(Poland) Marek Goczał	Can-Am	49:18:45	00:16:43
Stage 13	1	(Poland) Eryk Goczał	Can-Am	02:35:13		1	(Lithuania) Rokas Baciuška	Can-Am	51:41:34	
Stage 13	2	(Lithuania) Rokas Baciuška	Can-Am	02:39:32	00:04:19	2	(Poland) Eryk Goczał	Can-Am	51:44:58	00:03:24
Stage 13	3	(Saudi Arabia) Yasir Seaidan	Can-Am	02:45:09	00:09:56	3	(Poland) Marek Goczał	Can-Am	52:04:35	00:23:01
Stage 14	1	(Spain) Carlos Vento Sánchez	Can-Am	01:21:54		1	(Poland) Eryk Goczał	Can-Am	53:10:14	
Stage 14	2	(Brazil) Cristiano Batista	Can-Am	01:22:32	00:00:38	2	(Lithuania) Rokas Baciuška	Can-Am	53:26:58	00:16:44
Stage 14	3	(Poland) Michal Goczał	Can-Am	01:22:48	00:00:54	3	(Poland) Marek Goczał	Can-Am	53:28:29	00:18:15

=== Trucks ===
	Stage result					General classification				
Stage	Pos	Competitor	Make	Time	Gap	Pos	Competitor	Make	Time	Gap
Prologue	1	(Czech Republic) Martin Macík	Iveco	00:09:43		1	(Czech Republic) Martin Macík	Iveco	00:09:43	
Prologue	2	(Netherlands) Mitchel van den Brink	Iveco	00:09:48	00:00:05	2	(Netherlands) Mitchel van den Brink	Iveco	00:09:48	00:00:05
Prologue	3	(Netherlands) Janus van Kasteren	Iveco	00:09:49	00:00:06	3	(Netherlands) Janus van Kasteren	Iveco	00:09:49	00:00:06
Stage 1	1	(Czech Republic) Martin Macík	Iveco	03:57:18		1	(Czech Republic) Martin Macík	Iveco	03:57:18	
Stage 1	2	(Czech Republic) Aleš Loprais	Praga	04:02:19	00:05:01	2	(Czech Republic) Aleš Loprais	Praga	04:02:19	00:05:01
Stage 1	3	(Netherlands) Mitchel van den Brink	Iveco	04:06:36	00:09:18	3	(Netherlands) Mitchel van den Brink	Iveco	04:06:36	00:09:18
Stage 2	1	(Czech Republic) Aleš Loprais	Praga	05:38:18		1	(Czech Republic) Aleš Loprais	Praga	09:40:37	
Stage 2	2	(Netherlands) Janus van Kasteren	Iveco	05:40:08	00:01:50	2	(Netherlands) Janus van Kasteren	Iveco	09:52:54	00:12:17
Stage 2	3	(Netherlands) Martin van den Brink	Iveco	05:44:29	00:06:11	3	(Czech Republic) Jaroslav Valtr	Tatra	09:56:41	00:16:04
Stage 3	1	(Netherlands) Gert Huzink	Renault	03:50:42		1	(Czech Republic) Aleš Loprais	Praga	14:03:44	
Stage 3	2	(Netherlands) Martin van den Brink	Iveco	04:00:25	00:09:43	2	(Czech Republic) Jaroslav Valtr	Tatra	14:03:51	00:00:07
Stage 3	3	(Czech Republic) Martin Macík	Iveco	04:03:03	00:12:21	3	(Netherlands) Janus van Kasteren	Iveco	14:04:05	00:00:21
Stage 4	1	(Czech Republic) Martin Macík	Iveco	05:10:23		1	(Czech Republic) Aleš Loprais	Praga	19:23:29	
Stage 4	2	(Netherlands) Mitchel van den Brink	Iveco	05:19:13	00:08:50	2	(Netherlands) Martin van den Brink	Iveco	19:38:35	00:15:06
Stage 4	3	(Czech Republic) Aleš Loprais	Praga	05:19:45	00:09:22	3	(Czech Republic) Jaroslav Valtr	Tatra	19:57:38	00:34:09
Stage 5	1	(Czech Republic) Aleš Loprais	Praga	05:06:57		1	(Czech Republic) Aleš Loprais	Praga	24:30:26	
Stage 5	2	(Netherlands) Martin van den Brink	Iveco	05:07:13	00:00:16	2	(Netherlands) Martin van den Brink	Iveco	24:45:48	00:15:22
Stage 5	3	(Netherlands) Janus van Kasteren	Iveco	05:10:21	00:03:24	3	(Netherlands) Janus van Kasteren	Iveco	25:22:24	00:51:58
Stage 6	1	(Netherlands) Mitchel van den Brink	Iveco	03:46:58		1	(Netherlands) Martin van den Brink	Iveco	28:43:27	
Stage 6	2	(Netherlands) Janus van Kasteren	Iveco	03:47:33	00:00:35	2	(Czech Republic) Aleš Loprais	Praga	28:44:04	00:00:37
Stage 6	3	(Czech Republic) Martin Macík	Iveco	03:49:28	00:02:30	3	(Netherlands) Janus van Kasteren	Iveco	29:09:57	00:26:30
Stage 7	1	(Netherlands) Janus van Kasteren	Iveco	03:35:10		1	(Czech Republic) Aleš Loprais	Praga	32:22:56	
Stage 7	2	(Czech Republic) Aleš Loprais	Praga	03:38:52	00:03:42	2	(Netherlands) Martin van den Brink	Iveco	32:24:56	00:02:00
Stage 7	3	(Netherlands) Martin van den Brink	Iveco	03:41:29	00:06:19	3	(Netherlands) Janus van Kasteren	Iveco	32:45:07	00:22:11
Stage 8	1	(Czech Republic) Martin Macík	Iveco	04:04:28		1	(Czech Republic) Aleš Loprais	Praga	36:30:58	
Stage 8	2	(Netherlands) Mitchel van den Brink	Iveco	04:05:27	00:00:59	2	(Netherlands) Martin van den Brink	Iveco	36:47:15	00:16:17
Stage 8	3	(Czech Republic) Aleš Loprais	Praga	04:08:02	00:03:34	3	(Netherlands) Janus van Kasteren	Iveco	37:09:01	00:38:03
Stage 9	1	(Netherlands) Janus van Kasteren	Iveco	03:40:52		1	(Czech Republic) Aleš Loprais	Praga	40:22:59	
Stage 9	2	(Netherlands) Pascal de Baar	Renault	03:43:58	00:03:06	2	(Netherlands) Janus van Kasteren	Iveco	40:49:53	00:26:54
Stage 9	3	(Czech Republic) Jaroslav Valtr	Tatra	03:45:13	00:04:21	3	(Netherlands) Martin van den Brink	Iveco	41:09:07	00:46:08
Stage 10	1	(Netherlands) Pascal de Baar	Renault	02:09:46		1	(Netherlands) Janus van Kasteren	Iveco	43:00:51	
Stage 10	2	(Netherlands) Mitchel van den Brink	Iveco	02:10:08	00:00:22	2	(Netherlands) Martin van den Brink	Iveco	43:23:32	00:22:41
Stage 10	3	(Netherlands) Janus van Kasteren	Iveco	02:10:58	00:01:12	3	(Czech Republic) Martin Macík	Iveco	43:51:58	00:51:07
Stage 11	1	(Netherlands) Martin van den Brink	Iveco	03:39:52		1	(Netherlands) Janus van Kasteren	Iveco	47:02:12	
Stage 11	2	(Czech Republic) Martin Macík	Iveco	03:58:00	00:18:08	2	(Netherlands) Martin van den Brink	Iveco	47:03:24	00:01:12
Stage 11	3	(Netherlands) Pascal de Baar	Renault	03:58:10	00:18:18	3	(Czech Republic) Martin Macík	Iveco	47:49:58	00:47:46
Stage 12	1	(Netherlands) Janus van Kasteren	Iveco	02:30:38		1	(Netherlands) Janus van Kasteren	Iveco	49:32:50	
Stage 12	2	(Netherlands) Mitchel Van Den Brink	Iveco	02:49:16	00:18:38	2	(Netherlands) Martin van den Brink	Iveco	50:05:53	00:33:03
Stage 12	3	(Netherlands) Martin van den Brink	Iveco	03:02:29	00:31:51	3	(Czech Republic) Martin Macík	Iveco	50:52:57	01:20:07
Stage 13	1	(Czech Republic) Martin Macík	Iveco	03:02:43		1	(Netherlands) Janus van Kasteren	Iveco	52:38:58	
Stage 13	2	(Netherlands) Janus van Kasteren	Iveco	03:06:08	00:03:25	2	(Czech Republic) Martin Macík	Iveco	53:55:40	01:16:42
Stage 13	3	(Czech Republic) Jaroslav Valtr	Tatra	03:13:14	00:10:31	3	(Netherlands) Martin van den Brink	Iveco	55:22:01	02:43:03
Stage 14	1	(Lithuania) Vaidotas Paškevičius	Tatra	01:18:34		1	(Netherlands) Janus van Kasteren	Iveco	54:03:33	
Stage 14	2	(Netherlands) Mitchel van den Brink	Iveco	01:18:41	00:00:07	2	(Czech Republic) Martin Macík	Iveco	55:18:07	01:14:34
Stage 14	3	(Czech Republic) Jaroslav Valtr	Tatra	01:20:20	00:01:46	3	(Netherlands) Martin van den Brink	Iveco	56:43:55	02:40:22

=== Classics ===
	Stage result					General classification				
Stage	Pos	Competitor	Make	Points	Gap	Pos	Competitor	Make	Points	Gap
Prologue	Did not participate									
Stage 1	1	(France) Jérôme Galpin	Protruck	57		1	(France) Jérôme Galpin	Protruck	57	
Stage 1	2	(France) Christophe Berteloot	Toyota	76	+19	2	(France) Christophe Berteloot	Toyota	76	+19
Stage 1	3	(Spain) Juan Morera	Toyota	85	+28	3	(Spain) Juan Morera	Toyota	85	+28
Stage 2	1	(Spain) Juan Morera	Toyota	21		1	(Spain) Juan Morera	Toyota	106	
Stage 2	2	(Spain) Carlos Santaolalla	Toyota	34	+13	2	(Spain) Carlos Santaolalla	Toyota	136	+30
Stage 2	3	(Belgium) Eric Claeys	Toyota	46	+25	3	(Belgium) Eric Claeys	Toyota	163	+57
Stage 3	Stage cancelled									
Stage 4	1	(Spain) Luis Pedrals Marot	Nissan	28		1	(Spain) Juan Morera	Toyota	155	
Stage 4	2	(Spain) Carlos Santaolalla	Toyota	32	+4	2	(Spain) Carlos Santaolalla	Toyota	168	+13
Stage 4	3	(Belgium) Dirk van Rompuy	Toyota	32	+4	3	(Belgium) Eric Claeys	Toyota	204	+49
Stage 5	1	(Czech Republic) Ondřej Klymčiw	Škoda	12		1	(Spain) Juan Morera	Toyota	174	
Stage 5	2	(Belgium) Erik Qvick	Toyota	16	+4	2	(Spain) Carlos Santaolalla	Toyota	200	+26
Stage 5	3	(Spain) Juan Morera	Toyota	19	+7	3	(Belgium) Eric Qvick	Toyota	280	+106
Stage 6	1	(Spain) Carlos Santaolalla	Toyota	13		1	(Spain) Juan Morera	Toyota	204	
Stage 6	2	(Switzerland) Urbano Alfonso Gherardo Clerici	Nissan	13	0	2	(Spain) Carlos Santaolalla	Toyota	213	+9
Stage 6	3	(Switzerland) Julien Texier	Porsche	15	+2	3	(Belgium) Eric Qvick	Toyota	310	+106
Stage 7	1	(Italy) Paolo Bedeschi	Toyota	26		1	(Spain) Juan Morera	Toyota	233	
Stage 7	2	(Spain) Juan Morera	Toyota	29	+3	2	(Spain) Carlos Santaolalla	Toyota	250	+17
Stage 7	3	(Belgium) Dirk van Rompuy	Toyota	36	+10	3	(Belgium) Dirk van Rompuy	Toyota	350	+117
Stage 8	1	(Spain) Juan Morera	Toyota	38		1	(Spain) Juan Morera	Toyota	271	
Stage 8	2	(Italy) Paolo Bedeschi	Toyota	46	+8	2	(Spain) Carlos Santaolalla	Toyota	388	+117
Stage 8	3	(Czech Republic) Ondřej Klymčiw	Škoda	50	+12	3	(Belgium) Dirk van Rompuy	Toyota	416	+145
Stage 9	1	(Switzerland) Urbano Alfonso Gherardo Clerici	Nissan	21		1	(Spain) Juan Morera	Toyota	303	
Stage 9	2	(Switzerland) Julien Texier	Porsche	24	+3	2	(Spain) Carlos Santaolalla	Toyota	414	+111
Stage 9	3	(France) Jérôme Galpin	Protruck	26	+5	3	(Belgium) Dirk van Rompuy	Toyota	459	+156
Stage 10	1	(Switzerland) Urbano Alfonso Gherardo Clerici	Nissan	12		1	(Spain) Juan Morera	Toyota	336	
Stage 10	2	(France) Jérôme Galpin	Protruck	17	+5	2	(Spain) Carlos Santaolalla	Toyota	431	+95
Stage 10	3	(Spain) Carlos Santaolalla	Toyota	17	+5	3	(Belgium) Dirk van Rompuy	Toyota	496	+160
Stage 11	1	(Spain) Carlos Santaolalla	Toyota	21		1	(Spain) Juan Morera	Toyota	365	
Stage 11	2	(Spain) Juan Morera	Toyota	29	+8	2	(Spain) Carlos Santaolalla	Toyota	452	+87
Stage 11	3	(Italy) Paolo Bedeschi	Toyota	32	+11	3	(Italy) Paolo Bedeschi	Toyota	529	+164
Stage 12	1	(Switzerland) Urbano Alfonso Gherardo Clerici	Nissan	15		1	(Spain) Juan Morera	Toyota	390	
Stage 12	2	(Spain) Luis Pedrals Marot	Nissan	20	+5	2	(Spain) Carlos Santaolalla	Toyota	486	+96
Stage 12	3	(Spain) Juan Morera	Toyota	25	+10	3	(Italy) Paolo Bedeschi	Toyota	571	+181
Stage 13	1	(Switzerland) Urbano Alfonso Gherardo Clerici	Nissan	16		1	(Spain) Juan Morera	Toyota	428	
Stage 13	2	(France) Serge Mogno	Toyota	31	+15	2	(Spain) Carlos Santaolalla	Toyota	529	+101
Stage 13	3	(Spain) Juan Morera	Toyota	38	+22	3	(Italy) Paolo Bedeschi	Toyota	631	+203
Stage 14	Did not participate									

== Final standings ==
=== Bikes ===
Final standings (positions 1–10)
Rank	Rider	Bike	Time	Difference
1	(Argentina) Kevin Benavides	KTM 450 Rally Factory Replica	44:27:20	–
2	(Australia) Toby Price	KTM 450 Rally Factory Replica	44:28:03	+0:00:43
3	(United States) Skyler Howes	Husqvarna 450 Rally Factory Replica	44:32:24	+0:05:04
4	(Chile) Pablo Quintanilla	Honda CRF450 Rally	44:46:22	+0:19:02
5	(France) Adrien Van Beveren	Honda CRF450 Rally	44:47:50	+0:20:30
6	(Argentina) Luciano Benavides	Husqvarna 450 Rally Factory Replica	44:50:02	+0:22:42
7	(Australia) Daniel Sanders	Gas Gas 450 Rally Factory Replica	44:53:17	+0:25:57
8	(Chile) José Ignacio Cornejo	Honda CRF450 Rally	45:18:41	+0:51:21
9	(Spain) Lorenzo Santolino	Sherco 450 SEF Rally	45:45:13	+1:17:53
10	(Argentina) Franco Caimi	Hero 450 Rally	46:05:24	+1:38:04

Final standings (positions 11–80)
Rank	Rider	Bike	Time	Difference
11	(Czech Republic) Martin Michek	KTM 450 Rally Replica	46:09:44	+1:42:24
12	(Slovakia) Štefan Svitko	KTM 450 Rally Factory Replica	46:18:02	+1:50:42
13	(Spain) Tosha Schareina	KTM 450 Rally Replica	46:22:06	+1:54:46
14	(France) Romain Dumontier	Husqvarna 450 Rally	46:31:44	+2:04:24
15	(Italy) Paolo Lucci	KTM 450 Rally Factory Replica	47:03:58	+2:36:38
16	(South Africa) Michael Docherty	Husqvarna FR 450 Rally	47:48:27	+3:21:07
17	(France) Jean-Loup Lepan	KTM 450 Rally Replica	48:04:31	+3:37:11
18	(France) Neels Theric	Gas Gas 450 Rally	48:37:05	+4:09:45
19	(France) Julien Jagu	KTM 450 Rally Replica	48:38:16	+4:10:56
20	(Germany) Sebastian Bühler	Hero 450 Rally	48:42:33	+4:15:13
21	(France) Mathieu Doveze	KTM 450 Rally Factory Replica	48:45:41	+4:18:21
22	(United States) Jacob Argubright	Husqvarna 450 Rally Replica	48:49:16	+4:21:56
23	(Spain) Juan Pedrero García	KTM 450 Rally Factory Replica	48:56:31	+4:29:11
24	(Slovenia) Toni Mulec	Husqvarna 450 Rally	49:47:49	+5:20:29
25	(Argentina) Stefano Caimi	KTM 450 Rally Factory Replica	50:44:23	+6:17:03
26	(Botswana) Ross Branch	Hero 450 Rally	51:26:33	+6:59:13
27	(Romania) Emanuel Gyenes	KTM 450 Rally Factory Replica	52:20:55	+7:53:35
28	(South Africa) Charan Moore	Husqvarna 450 Rally	52:24:42	+7:57:22
29	(France) Benjamin Melot	KTM 450 Rally Factory Replica	52:25:35	+7:58:15
30	(Spain) Javi Vega	Yamaha WR450F Rally	52:45:43	+8:18:23
31	(Czech Republic) Jan Brabec	KTM 450 Rally Factory Replica	53:03:18	+8:35:58
32	(Belgium) Jérôme Martiny	Husqvarna 450 Rally	53:25:20	+8:58:00
33	(France) Charlie Herbst	KTM 450 Rally Replica	53:41:58	+9:14:38
34	(Portugal) Mario Patrão	KTM 450 Rally Factory Replica	53:55:24	+9:28:04
35	(United Arab Emirates) Mohammed Balooshi	Husqvarna FR 450 Rally	54:21:38	+9:54:18
36	(Czech Republic) David Pabiška	KTM 450 Rally Factory Replica	55:44:56	+11:17:36
37	(Chile) Patricio Cabrera	KTM 450 Rally	55:47:24	+11:20:04
38	(Venezuela) Nicolas Alberto Cardona Vagnoni	KTM 450 Rally Replica	56:24:24	+11:57:04
39	(Denmark) Thomas Kongshøj	Husqvarna 450 Rally Replica	57:01:57	+12:34:37
40	(Netherlands) Wesley Aaldering	Husqvarna FR 450 Rally	57:15:40	+12:48:20
41	(France) David Gaits	KTM 450 Rally	57:18:29	+12:51:09
42	(France) Mathieu Troquier	KTM 450 Rally Replica	57:22:06	+12:54:46
43	(France) Bertrand Gavard	Husqvarna 450 Rally	57:22:43	+12:55:23
44	(China) Sunier Sunier	Kove 450	57:41:30	+13:14:10
45	(Italy) Lorenzo Maria Fanottoli	KTM 450 Rally Factory Replica	57:58:06	+13:30:46
46	(Netherlands) Mirjam Pol	Husqvarna 450 Rally	58:42:25	+14:15:05
47	(Slovenia) Simon Marčič	Husqvarna FE Rally Replica	58:46:18	+14:18:58
48	(United Kingdom) Makis Dewi Rees-Stavros	Husqvarna FR450 Rally	59:14:03	+14:46:43
49	(France) Cédric Jacques	KTM 450 Rally	59:18:26	+14:51:06
50	(Chile) Tomás De Gavardo	KTM 450 Rally	59:43:36	+15:16:16
51	(China) Zaker Yakp	KTM 450 Rally Factory Replica	59:53:42	+15:26:22
52	(Kuwait) Abdullah Al Shatti	KTM 450 Rally	60:38:20	+16:11:00
53	(Guatemala) Francisco Arredondo	KTM 450 Rally Factory Replica	61:43:56	+17:16:36
54	(United States) Petr Vlček	KTM 450 Rally	61:45:17	+17:17:57
55	(France) Michael Jacobi	Gas Gas 450 Rally Replica	62:32:18	+18:04:58
56	(South Africa) Stuart Gregory	KTM 450 Rally Replica	63:15:41	+18:48:21
57	(France) Pierre Peyrard	KTM 450 Rally Replica	63:28:57	+19:01:37
58	(France) Clément Razy	KTM 450 Rally	63:31:56	+19:04:36
59	(Italy) Cesare Zacchetti	KTM 450 Rally Factory Replica	64:18:18	+19:50:58
60	(Spain) Sergio Vaquero	KTM 450 Rally Replica	64:55:06	+20:27:46
61	(China) Deng Liansong	Kove 450	65:36:52	+21:09:32
62	(China) Zhao Hongyi	KTM 450 Rally Factory Replica	65:59:11	+21:31:51
63	(Spain) Javier San José Yétor	KTM 450 Rally Replica	66:46:00	+22:18:40
64	(Italy) Ottavio Missoni	Honda CRF450R	66:46:48	+22:19:28
65	(South Africa) Kirsten Landman	KTM 450 Rally Replica	67:37:08	+23:09:48
66	(Italy) Franco Picco	Fantic 450 Rally	68:07:32	+23:40:12
67	(Canada) Gareth Jones	Husqvarna FR 450 Rally	69:01:44	+24:34:24
68	(South Africa) Stevan Wilken	Husqvarna FR 450 Rally	69:24:50	+24:57:30
69	(France) Benjamin Lepelley	Husqvarna 450 Rally	69:53:48	+25:26:28
70	(United Kingdom) James Martyn Hillier	Gas Gas 450 Rally	70:05:40	+25:38:20
71	(China) Fang Ming Ji	Kove 450	72:43:22	+28:16:02
72	(Italy) Iader Giraldi	KTM 450 Rally Factory Replica	74:42:28	+30:15:08
73	(France) Kévin Durand	Honda CRF450RX Rally RS	76:11:04	+31:43:44
74	(Argentina) Diego Gamaliel Llanos	KTM 450 Rally Factory Replica	78:08:50	+33:41:30
75	(Spain) Rachid Al-Lal Lahadil	Husqvarna 450 Rally Replica	78:19:50	+33:52:30
76	(Spain) Fernando Domínguez	KTM 450 Rally Replica	81:10:46	+36:43:26
77	(United States) Morrison Hart	KTM 450 Rally Replica	85:45:15	+41:17:55
78	(China) Zhang Min	KTM 450 Rally Factory Replica	106:23:33	+61:56:13
79	(Italy) Eufrasio Anghileri	Honda CRF450RX Rally RS	121:26:54	+76:59:34
80	(Spain) Ruben Saldaña Goñi	KTM 450 Rally Factory Replica	200:01:13	+155:33:53

=== Quads ===
Final standings
Rank	Rider	Bike	Time	Difference
1	(France) Alexandre Giroud	Yamaha Raptor 700	56:44:30	–
2	(Argentina) Francisco Moreno Flores	Yamaha Raptor 700	57:27:41	+0:43:11
3	(United States) Pablo Copetti	Yamaha Raptor 700	58:37:25	+1:52:55
4	(Slovakia) Juraj Varga	Yamaha Raptor 700	59:35:52	+2:51:22
5	(Chile) Giovanni Enrico	Yamaha Raptor 700	61:41:41	+4:57:11
6	(Spain) Toni Vingut	Yamaha Raptor 700	65:22:32	+8:38:02
7	(Lithuania) Laisvydas Kancius	Yamaha Raptor 700	76:00:23	+19:15:53
8	(Argentina) Carlos Alejandro Verza	Yamaha Raptor 700	81:35:00	+24:50:30
9	(Brazil) Marcelo Medeiros	Yamaha Raptor 700	86:47:55	+30:03:25
10	(Argentina) Alejandro Fantoni	Yamaha Raptor 700	94:47:16	+38:02:46

=== Original by Motul ===
The Original by Motul class, also known as the Malle Moto class, refers to bikes and quads competitors competing without any kind of assistance. The organizers provide 1 trunk per competitor for storage of the personal belongings, spare parts and tools. Competitors are only allowed to bring 1 headlight, 1 set of wheels, 1 set of tyres, 1 tent with sleeping bag and mattress, 1 travel bag and 1x 25 liter (6.6 gallon) backpack. Organizers allow free use of the generators, compressors and tool-boxes in the bivouac.

Final standings (positions 1–10)
Rank	Rider	Bike	Time	Difference
1	(South Africa) Charan Moore	Husqvarana 450 Rally	52:24:42	–
2	(Spain) Javi Vega	Yamaha WR450F Rally	52:45:43	+0:21:01
3	(Portugal) Mario Patrão	KTM 450 Rally Factory Replica	53:55:24	+1:30:42
4	(Czech Republic) David Pabiška	KTM 450 Rally Factory Replica	55:44:56	+3:20:14
5	(France) David Gaits	KTM 450 Rally	57:18:29	+4:53:47
6	(Slovenia) Simon Marčič	Husqvarna FE Rally Replica	58:46:18	+6:21:36
7	(United Kingdom) Makis Dewi Rees-Stavros	Husqvarna FR450 Rally	59:14:03	+6:49:21
8	(United States) Petr Vlček	KTM 450 Rally	61:45:17	+9:20:35
9	(South Africa) Stuart Gregory	KTM 450 Rally Replica	63:15:41	+10:50:59
10	(France) Clément Razy	KTM 450 Rally	63:31:56	+11:07:14

=== Cars ===
Final standings (positions 1–10)
Rank	Driver	Co-Driver	Car	Time	Difference
1	(Qatar) Nasser Al-Attiyah	(France) Mathieu Baumel	Toyota GR DKR Hilux	45:03:15	–
2	(France) Sébastien Loeb	(Belgium) Fabian Lurquin	Prodrive Hunter T1+	46:24:04	+1:20:49
3	(Brazil) Lucas Moraes	(Germany) Timo Gottschalk	Toyota Hilux Overdrive	46:41:46	+1:38:31
4	(South Africa) Giniel De Villiers	(South Africa) Dennis Murphy	Toyota Hilux Overdrive	47:34:27	+2:31:12
5	(South Africa) Henk Lategan	(South Africa) Brett Cummings	Toyota GR DKR Hilux	47:39:38	+2:36:23
6	(Czech Republic) Martin Prokop	(Czech Republic) Viktor Chytka	Ford Raptor RS Cross Country	48:43:59	+3:40:44
7	(Argentina) Juan Cruz Yacopini	(Spain) Daniel Oliveras Carreras	Toyota Hilux Overdrive	49:30:24	+4:27:09
8	(China) Wei Han	(China) Ma Li	SMG HW2021	49:32:36	+4:29:21
9	(Argentina) Sebastián Halpern	(Argentina) Bernardo Graue	Mini John Cooper Works Plus	49:45:53	+4:42:38
10	(France) Guerlain Chicherit	(France) Alex Winocq	Prodrive Hunter T1+	50:25:25	+5:22:10

Final standings (positions 11–44)
Rank	Driver	Co-Driver	Car	Time	Difference
11	(France) Christian Lavieille	(France) Valentin Sarreaud	MD Rallye Sport Optimus	50:45:47	+5:42:32
12	(France) Mathieu Serradori	(France) Loic Minaudier	Century CR6-T	51:31:27	+6:28:12
13	(France) Pierre Lachaume	(Belgium) Francois Beguin	MD Rallye Sport Optimus	51:44:32	+6:41:17
14	(Sweden) Mattias Ekström	(Sweden) Emil Bergkvist	Audi RS Q e-tron	51:54:15	+6:51:00
15	(China) Guoyu Zhang	(France) Jean-Pierre Garcin	BAIC BJ40	52:09:03	+7:05:48
16	(United Arab Emirates) Khalid Al Qassimi	(Norway) Ola Fløene	Mini John Cooper Works Buggy	52:13:44	+7:10:29
17	(Poland) Jakub Przygoński	(Spain) Armand Monleón	Mini John Cooper Works Plus	52:32:05	+7:28:50
18	(France) Pascal Thomasse	(France) Gérard Dubuy	MD Rallye Sport Optimus	52:45:11	+7:41:56
19	(France) Jérôme Pélichet	(France) Pascal Larroque	MD Rallye Sport Optimus	52:55:30	+7:52:15
20	(France) Ludovic Gherardi	(France) François Borsotto	MD Rallye Sport Optimus	53:42:16	+8:39:01
21	(Kyrgyzstan) Denis Krotov	Konstantin Zhiltsov	Mini John Cooper Works Buggy	53:45:31	+8:42:16
22	(France) Romain Dumas	(France) Max Delfino	Toyota GR DKR Hilux	54:49:41	+9:46:26
23	(Spain) Carlos Checa	(Spain) Marc Solà Terradellas	Astara 01 Concept	54:55:43	+9:52:28
24	(Spain) Isidre Esteve Pujol	(Spain) José Maria Villalobos Valcarcel	Toyota Hilux Overdrive	55:42:50	+10:39:35
25	(France) Jean Remy Bergounhe	(France) Lionel Costes	MD Rallye Sport Optimus	58:05:05	+13:01:50
26	(France) Jean Pierre Strugo	(France) Christophe Crespo	MD Rallye Sport Optimus	60:19:42	+15:16:27
27	(China) Zi Yunliang	(China) Sha He	BAIC BJ40	60:27:53	+15:24:38
28	(Germany) Daniel Schröder	(South Africa) Ryan Bland	Nissan Navara VK50	60:47:47	+15:44:32
29	(Paraguay) Andrea Lafarja	(Peru) Ashley García Chávez	Toyota Hilux Overdrive	60:53:45	+15:50:30
30	(Switzerland) Alexandre Pesci	(Switzerland) Stephan Kuhni	Toyota GR DKR Hilux	61:57:51	+16:54:36
31	(China) Po Tian	(China) Du Xuanyi	SMG HW2021	63:39:09	+18:35:54
32	(Spain) Laia Sanz	(Italy) Maurizio Gerini	Astara 01 Concept	64:21:54	+19:18:39
33	(United Kingdom) Thomas Bell	(South Africa) Gerhard Schutte	Nissan Navara VK56	69:09:12	+24:05:57
34	(South Africa) Brian Baragwanath	(South Africa) Leonard Cremer	Century CR6-T	70:35:32	+25:32:17
35	(Netherlands) Maik Willems	(Netherlands) Robert Van Pelt	Toyota Hilux Overdrive	71:30:33	+26:27:18
36	(Netherlands) Dave Klaassen	(Netherlands) Tessa Rooth	Nissan Navara VK56	74:26:18	+29:23:03
37	(Saudi Arabia) Yazeed Al-Rajhi	(Germany) Dirk von Zitzewitz	Toyota Hilux Overdrive	81:55:30	+36:52:15
38	(France) Jean-Philippe Beziat	(France) Vincent Albira	MD Rallye Sport Optimus	90:50:34	+45:47:19
39	(France) Hugues Moilet	(Belgium) Olivier Imschoot	MD Rallye Sport Optimus	94:35:16	+49:32:01
40	(Netherlands) Ronald van Loon	(Netherlands) Erik Lemmen	Nissan Navara VK50	104:09:32	+59:06:17
41	(France) Yannick Panagiotis	(France) Valérie Panagiotis	Century CR6	116:57:40	+71:54:25
42	(Netherlands) Tim Coronel	(Netherlands) Tom Coronel	Century CR6	121:08:20	+76:05:05
43	(Lithuania) Gintas Petrus	(Portugal) José Marques	MD Rallye Sport Optimus	121:19:30	+76:16:15
44	(France) Roger Audas	(France) Patrick Prot	Sodicars BV2	157:42:31	+112:39:16

=== Light Prototypes ===
Final standings (positions 1–10)
Rank	Driver	Co-Driver	Car	Time	Difference
1	(United States) Austin Jones	(Brazil) Gustavo Gugelmin	Can-Am Maverick XRS	51:55:53	–
2	(United States) Seth Quintero	(Germany) Dennis Zenz	Can-Am Maverick XRS	52:47:58	+0:52:05
3	(Belgium) Guillaume De Mévius	(France) François Cazalet	OT3 - 04	53:31:35	+1:35:42
4	(Spain) Cristina Gutiérrez	(Spain) Pablo Moreno Huete	Can-Am Maverick XRS	54:52:13	+2:56:20
5	(Chile) Francisco López Contardo	(Chile) Juan Pablo Latrach Vinagre	Can-Am Maverick XRS	54:55:41	+2:59:48
6	(Saudi Arabia) Saleh Alsaif	(Portugal) João Pedro Vitoria Re	Can-Am Maverick X3	56:10:01	+4:14:08
7	(South Africa) Ebenhaezer Basson	(South Africa) Bertus Leander Pienaar	OT3 - 04	56:49:59	+4:54:06
8	(Netherlands) Hans Weijs	(Netherlands) Rudolf Meijer	Arcane T3	58:08:58	+6:13:05
9	(Spain) Santiago Navarro	(France) Adrien Metge	Can-Am Maverick X3	58:30:40	+6:34:47
10	(Chile) Ignacio Casale	(Chile) Alvaro Leon	Yamaha X-Raid YXZ 1000R Turbo Prototype	58:49:20	+6:53:27

Final standings (positions 11–38)
Rank	Driver	Co-Driver	Car	Time	Difference
11	(Czech Republic) Josef Macháček	(Czech Republic) David Schovanek	Buggyra Can-Am DV21	62:01:54	+10:06:01
12	(Portugal) Ricardo Porém	(Argentina) Agusto Sanz	Yamaha X-Raid YXZ 1000R Turbo Prototype	62:42:34	+10:46:41
13	(South Africa) Geoff Minnitt	(South Africa) Gerhard Snyman	Can-Am Maverick XRS	62:58:07	+11:02:14
14	(Netherlands) Anja van Loon	(Ukraine) Dmytro Tsyro	Can-Am Maverick XRS	63:29:30	+11:33:37
15	(France) Jean-Luc Ceccaldi-Pisson	(France) Cédric Duplé	PH-Sport Zephyr	65:40:14	+13:44:21
16	(Spain) Joan Font	(Spain) Themis López	Can-Am Maverick X3	68:29:29	+16:33:36
17	(Qatar) Ahmed Alkuwari Fahad	(Italy) Manuel Lucchese	Yamaha X-Raid YXZ 1000R Turbo Prototype	69:00:14	+17:04:21
18	(France) Claude Fournier	(France) Arnold Brucy	Can-Am Maverick X3	71:25:15	+19:29:22
19	(France) Jean-Pascal Besson	(France) Delphine Delfino	Can-Am MMP	71:59:01	+20:03:08
20	(Ecuador) Brad Salazar	(Argentina) Eugenio Andres Arrieta	Can-Am Maverick X3	72:40:59	+20:45:06
21	(Spain) Xavier Foj	(Spain) Antonio Angulo	Oryx T3	73:29:38	+21:33:45
22	(France) Benjamin Lattard	(France) Patrick Jimbert	Can-Am MMP	79:01:59	+27:06:06
23	(United States) Mitch Guthrie	(United States) Kellon Walch	MCE-5 Development T3M	79:54:01	+27:58:08
24	(Saudi Arabia) Mashael Alobaidan	(Italy) Paolo Ceci	Can-Am Maverick XRS	80:42:21	+28:46:28
25	(Colombia) António Marmolejo	(Argentina) Ariel Jatón	Can-Am Maverick XRS	81:27:34	+29:31:41
26	(Colombia) Javier Vélez	(Colombia) Mateo Moreno Kristiansen	Can-Am Maverick X3	84:03:14	+32:07:21
27	(Portugal) Hélder Rodrigues	(Portugal) Gonçalo Reis	Can-Am Maverick XRS	87:14:12	+35:18:19
28	(Saudi Arabia) Dania Akeel	(Uruguay) Sergio Lafuente	Can-Am Maverick XRS	87:39:22	+35:43:29
29	(France) José Castan	(France) Jean-François Palissier	Can-Am Mamba RM Sport	88:27:27	+36:31:34
30	(Argentina) David Zille	(Argentina) Sebastian Cesana	Can-Am Maverick XRS	92:01:18	+40:05:25
31	(France) Antoine Méo	(France) Fabien Planet	PH-Sport Zephyr	93:28:29	+41:32:36
32	(Brazil) Pâmela Bozzano	(Brazil) Carlos Sachs	Can-Am Maverick X3	97:09:16	+45:13:23
33	(Seychelles) Aliyyah Koloc	(France) Stéphane Duplé	Buggyra Can-Am ZV21	98:47:59	+46:52:06
34	(Brazil) Enio Bozzano Junior	(Brazil) Luciano Gómez	Can-Am Maverick X3	98:57:37	+47:01:44
35	(Italy) Camelia Liparoti	(Spain) Xavier Blanco García	Yamaha X-Raid YXZ 1000R Turbo Prototype	116:41:58	+64:46:05
36	(Uruguay) Patricia Pita Gago	(Argentina) Ruben García	Can-Am Maverick	133:06:30	+81:10:37
37	(Portugal) João Ferreira	(Portugal) Filipe Palmeiro	Yamaha X-Raid YXZ 1000R Turbo Prototype	175:50:33	+123:54:40
38	(Chile) Lucas Del Rio	(Argentina) Bruno Jacomy	Can-Am Maverick XRS	196:19:19	+144:23:26

=== SSVs ===
Final standings (positions 1–10)
Rank	Driver	Co-Driver	Car	Time	Difference
1	(Poland) Eryk Goczał	(Spain) Oriol Mena	Can-Am Maverick XRS	53:10:14	–
2	(Lithuania) Rokas Baciuška	(Spain) Oriol Vidal Montijano	Can-Am Maverick XRS	53:26:58	+0:16:44
3	(Poland) Marek Goczał	(Poland) Maciej Marton	Can-Am Maverick XRS	53:28:29	+0:18:15
4	(Argentina) Jeremías González Ferioli	(Argentina) Pedro Gonzalo Rinaldi	Can-Am Maverick XRS	54:17:14	+1:07:00
5	(Spain) Gerard Farrés	(Spain) Diego Ortega Gil	Can-Am Maverick XRS	54:59:32	+1:49:18
6	(Brazil) Bruno Conti de Olivera	(Portugal) Pedro Bianchi Prata	Can-Am Maverick	56:12:35	+3:02:21
7	(Poland) Michal Goczał	(Poland) Szymon Gospodarczyk	Can-Am Maverick XRS	57:12:53	+4:02:39
8	(Ecuador) Sebastian Guayasamin	(Argentina) Ricardo Adrian Torlaschi	Can-Am Maverick XRS	57:57:48	+4:47:34
9	(Spain) Pau Navarro	(France) Michaël Metge	Can-Am Maverick X3	58:01:14	+4:51:00
10	(France) Florent Vayssade	(France) Nicolas Rey	Polaris RZR Pro R	59:21:58	+6:11:44

Final standings (positions 11–39)
Rank	Driver	Co-Driver	Car	Time	Difference
11	(Estonia) Toomas Triisa	(Estonia) Mart Meeru	Can-Am Maverick X3	59:28:52	+6:18:38
12	(Australia) Molly Taylor	(United States) Andrew Short	Can-Am Maverick XRS	59:38:36	+6:28:22
13	(France) Éric Abel	(France) Serge Gounon	Can-Am Maverick X3	60:00:53	+6:50:39
14	(Netherlands) Paul Spierings	(Netherlands) Jan-Pieter van der Stelt	Can-Am Maverick X3	60:39:32	+7:29:18
15	(Netherlands) Gert-Jan Van Der Valk	(Netherlands) Branco De Lange	Can-Am Maverick	60:56:11	+7:45:57
16	(Argentina) Pato Silva	(France) Xavier Flick	Can-Am Maverick X3	61:07:35	+7:57:21
17	(Austria) Nicolas Brabeck-Letmathe	(France) Brice Aloth	Can-Am Maverick XRS	62:30:59	+9:20:45
18	(Lithuania) Tomas Jančys	(Lithuania) Irmantas Bražiūnas	Can-Am Maverick X3	62:53:49	+9:43:35
19	(France) Xavier de Soultrait	(France) Martin Bonnet	Polaris RZR Pro R	63:05:33	+9:55:19
20	(France) Christophe Cresp	(France) Jean Brucy	Can-Am Maverick XRS	64:27:57	+11:17:43
21	(France) Stéphane Consani	(France) Thibault Jean de la Haye	Can-Am Maverick XRS	65:01:02	+11:50:48
22	(Netherlands) Jeffrey Otten	(Netherlands) Marco Bouman	Can-Am Maverick X3	67:04:19	+13:54:05
23	(Saudi Arabia) Yasir Seaidan	(United Arab Emirates) Alexey Kuzmich	Can-Am Maverick XRS	70:26:46	+17:16:32
24	(France) Frédéric Chesneau	(France) Stéphane Chesneau	Can-Am Maverick	81:28:10	+28:17:56
25	(Argentina) Nicolás Cavigliasso	(Argentina) Valentina Pertegarini	Can-Am Maverick X3	82:13:24	+29:03:10
26	(Argentina) Ramón Núñez	(Argentina) Mauro Esteban Lipez	Can-Am Maverick XRS	85:16:53	+32:06:39
27	(Japan) Shinsuke Umeda	(Argentina) Facundo Jaton	Polaris RZR Pro R	85:18:05	+32:07:51
28	(Chile) Luis Diaz Soza	(Chile) Stanley Sherrington	Can-Am Maverick X3	85:44:15	+32:34:01
29	(Brazil) Rodrigo Luppi De Oliveira	(Brazil) Maykel Justo	Can-Am Maverick XRS	87:51:11	+34:40:57
30	(Italy) Pietro Cinotto	(Italy) Alberto Bertoldi	Polaris RZR Pro R	91:33:17	+38:23:03
31	(Spain) Oscar Ral Verdu	(Spain) Carlos Jimenez Valls	Can-Am Maverick X3	94:45:01	+41:34:47
32	(Brazil) Cristiano Batista	(Spain) Fausto Mota	Can-Am Maverick X3	98:47:40	+45:37:26
33	(Italy) Ferdinando Brachetti Peretti	(Italy) Matteo Casuccio	Polaris RZR Pro R	115:46:07	+62:35:53
34	(Spain) Pedro Manuel Peñate Muñoz	(Spain) Rosa Romero Font	Can-Am Maverick X3	115:53:44	+62:43:30
35	(France) Benoît Lepiètre	(France) Peter Serra	Can-Am Maverick X3	127:34:12	+74:23:58
36	(France) Jean-Claude Pla	(France) Cyril Pla	Polaris RZR Pro R	130:51:55	+77:41:41
37	(Mozambique) Paulo Oliveira	(Portugal) Miguel Alberty	Can-Am Maverick X3	134:07:18	+80:57:04
38	(Spain) Carlos Vento Sánchez	(Spain) Carlos Ruiz Moreno	Can-Am Maverick X3	152:00:02	+98:49:48
39	(France) Christophe Baillet	(France) Jean-Louis Simon Herbeth	Can-Am Maverick XRS	159:00:57	+105:50:43

=== Trucks ===
Final standings (positions 1–10)
Rank	Driver	Co-Driver	Technician	Truck	Time	Difference
1	(Netherlands) Janus van Kasteren	(Poland) Darek Rodewald	(Netherlands) Marcel Snijders	Iveco PowerStar	54:03:33	–
2	(Czech Republic) Martin Macík	(Czech Republic) František Tomášek	(Czech Republic) David Švanda	Iveco PowerStar	55:18:07	+1:14:34
3	(Netherlands) Martin van den Brink	(Netherlands) Erik Kofman	(Netherlands) Rijk Mouw	Iveco PowerStar	56:43:55	+2:40:22
4	(Netherlands) Mitchel van den Brink	(Netherlands) Jarno van de Pol	(Spain) Moi Torrallardona	Iveco PowerStar	58:06:02	+4:02:29
5	(Czech Republic) Jaroslav Valtr	(Czech Republic) Rene Kilian	(Czech Republic) Tomáš Šikola	Tatra Phoenix	59:09:42	+5:06:09
6	(Czech Republic) Martin Šoltys	(Czech Republic) Roman Krejčí	(Czech Republic) David Hoffmann	Tatra 815	63:12:16	+9:08:43
7	(Netherlands) Ben van de Laar	(Netherlands) Jan van de Laar	(Netherlands) Adolph Huijgens	Iveco 4x4 DRNL	64:52:59	+10:49:26
8	(Netherlands) Richard de Groot	(Netherlands) Mark Laan	(Netherlands) Jan Hulsebosch	Iveco PowerStar	67:48:48	+13:45:15
9	(Czech Republic) Tomáš Vrátný	(Poland) Bartłomiej Boba	(Czech Republic) Jaromír Martinec	Tatra Jamal	68:27:25	+14:23:52
10	(Japan) Teruhito Sugawara	(Japan) Hirokazu Somemiya	(Japan) Yuji Mochizuki	Hino 600-Hybrid	72:58:33	+18:55:00

Final standings (positions 11–22)
Rank	Driver	Co-Driver	Technician	Truck	Time	Difference
11	(Netherlands) Ad Hofmans	(Netherlands) Mark Salomons	(Netherlands) Remon van der Steen	DAF CF75	76:27:06	+23:23:33
12	(Netherlands) Adwin Hoondert	(Netherlands) Jasper Riezebos	(Netherlands) Erwin de Vos	Renault K520	79:44:07	+25:40:34
13	(Italy) Claudio Bellina	(Italy) Bruno Gotti	(Italy) Giulio Minelli	Iveco PowerStar	82:16:42	+28:13:09
14	(Netherlands) Gerrit Zuurmond	(Netherlands) Tjeerd Van Ballegooy	(Netherlands) Klaas Kwakkel	MAN TGA	102:47:22	+48:43:49
15	(Netherlands) Pascal de Baar	(Poland) Marcin Krüger	(Netherlands) Stefan Slootjes	Renault C460	110:07:29	+56:03:56
16	(Slovakia) Robert Kasak	(Slovakia) Tomáš Kazarka	(Czech Republic) Jaroslav Kolář	Tatra Phoenix	110:12:55	+56:09:22
17	(Lithuania) Vaidotas Paškevičius	(Lithuania) Slavomir Volkov	(Lithuania) Tomas Gužauskas	Tatra Jamal	130:06:56	+76:03:23
18	(Belgium) Igor Bouwens	(Senegal) Syndiely Wade	(Belgium) Ulrich Boerboom	Iveco T-Way	156:01:47	+101:58:14
19	(Belgium) Dave Ingels	(Netherlands) Johannes Schotanus	(Portugal) Joao Dias	MAN TGA 26.480	157:37:09	+103:33:36
20	(Portugal) José Martins	(France) Jérémie Gimbre	(France) Eric Simonin	Iveco Trakker	158:20:14	+104:16:41
21	(Germany) Mathias Behringer	(Netherlands) Hugo Kupper	(Germany) Robert Striebe	MAN	158:25:21	+104:21:48
22	(Czech Republic) Tomáš Tomeček	(Italy) Niccolo Funaioli	(Netherlands) Ard Munster	Tatra 815-2T0R45	167:17:59	+113:14:26

=== Classics ===
Final standings (positions 1–10)
Rank	Driver	Co-Driver	Technician	Vehicle	Points	Difference
1	(Spain) Juan Morera	(Spain) Lidia Ruba	none	Toyota HDJ80	428	–
2	(Spain) Carlos Santaolalla	(Spain) Aran Sol I Juanola	none	Toyota HDJ80	529	+101
3	(Italy) Paolo Bedeschi	(Italy) Daniele Bottallo	none	Toyota BJ71	631	+203
4	(Italy) Riccardo Garosci	(Italy) Rudy Briani	none	Nissan Terrano 2	813	+385
5	(France) Serge Mogno	(France) Florent Drulhon	none	Toyota HDJ80	889	+461
6	(Belgium) Dirk van Rompuy	(Belgium) Christiaan Michel Goris	none	Toyota Land Cruiser HDJ80	923	+495
7	(Belgium) Erik Qvick	(Belgium) Jean-Marie Lurquin	none	Toyota Land Cruiser HDJ80	1055	+627
8	(Switzerland) Julien Texier	(France) Jérémy Athimon	none	Porsche Martiny	1163	+735
9	(Belgium) Rene Declercq	(Belgium) John Demeester	none	Bombardier Iltis	1414	+986
10	(Switzerland) Céedric Zolliker	(Germany) Clemens Lansing	none	Toyota HDJ80	1732	+1304

Final standings (positions 11–22)
Rank	Driver	Co-Driver	Technician	Truck	Time	Difference

== Incidents ==
Stage 1. Previous year bike winner Sam Sunderland suffered an accident at the 52nd kilometer of the stage and was airlifted to Yanbu hospital with a concussion and a fractured shoulder.

Motorcyclist Bradley Cox suffered a broken elbow in an accident, forcing him to withdraw.

Michel Kremer and Thomas de Bois in the car category suffered a fuel leak, which caused the car to catch fire and burn beyond repair. The driver and the co-driver were unharmed.

Stage 3. Ricky Brabec suffered an accident at the 274th kilometer of the stage and was attended by the medical team. Brabec was transported to hospital after complaining of neck pain, ending his rally.

Stage 4. Joaquim Rodrigues suffered a fall at roughly the 90 kilometer mark of the stage and was taken to hospital in Ha’il with a broken left femur.

Lithuanian driver Benediktas Vanagas was airlifted from the stage after an accident after displaying concussion-like symptoms.

Stage 6. Audi teammates Carlos Sainz and Stéphane Peterhansel crashed in separate incidents at the same spot during kilometer 212 of the stage. Peterhansel's co-driver Édouard Boulanger suffered a broken vertebra in their accident, forcing their withdrawal from the rally.

Stage 7. Dutch driver Erik van Loon suffered a roll 99 kilometers into the stage. Van Loon was airlifted to hospital after he briefly lost consciousness and complained of neck pain after the wreck.

Stage 9. During the stage, Livio Sassinotti, an Italian spectator, died after being involved in an incident with Aleš Loprais' truck on a sand dune. Sassinotti was airlifted from the scene, but perished before reaching a hospital. The incident marked the fourth consecutive year that the Dakar Rally had seen a fatality. Loprais, who was the leader of the Truck category at the time, had to miss Stage 10 pending a police investigation, and abandoned the rally.

Spanish motorcyclist Joan Barreda suffered an accident 16 kilometers into the stage. Barreda was airlifted to a hospital with a fractured vertebra, forcing his withdrawal from the rally.

Spanish driver Carlos Sainz suffered an accident roughly six kilometers into the stage. Sainz initially was evacuated by helicopter due to back and neck pain, but requested the helicopter turn around mid-flight so that he could return to the car and try to finish the rally. Sainz managed to return the car to the bivouac, but was forced to withdraw after finding the car was too badly damaged to be repaired.
