= 2024 World Rally-Raid Championship =

Rally raid competition season

2024 World Rally-Raid Championship
Previous:	2023	Next:	2025

The 2024 World Rally-Raid Championship was the third season of the annual competition for rally raid events sanctioned by both the FIA and FIM. The Amaury Sport Organization is in the third of a five-year contract to promote the championship.

A major overhaul of the class name terminology took place before the season, with the T1, T2, T3, T4, and T5 categories being renamed to the Ultimate, Stock, Challenger, SSV, and Truck categories for 2024.

== Calendar ==
The calendar for the 2024 season features five rally-raid events. The prestigious Dakar Rally once again hosted the opening event, with the Abu Dhabi Desert Challenge, Desafio Ruta 40, and Rallye du Maroc events returning to the calendar. The Portugal-based BP Ultimate Rally-Raid would be added to the schedule.

Round	Dates	Rally name	Format
1	5 January–19 January	(Saudi Arabia) Dakar Rally	Marathon
2	25 February–2 March	(United Arab Emirates) Abu Dhabi Desert Challenge	Rally
3	2–7 April	BP Ultimate Rally-Raid Portugal	Rally
4	2–8 June	(Argentina) Desafío Ruta 40	Rally
5	5–11 October	(Morocco) Rallye du Maroc	Rally

== FIA World Rally-Raid Championship ==
- Entrants competing in the Ultimate, Challenger, and SSV classes are eligible for the overall World Championship.

=== Entry list ===
Ultimate Teams & Drivers
Constructor	Vehicle	Team	Driver	Co-driver	Rounds
Audi	RS Q e-tron	(Germany) Team Audi Sport	(France) Stéphane Peterhansel	(France) Édouard Boulanger	1
Audi	RS Q e-tron	(Germany) Team Audi Sport	(Spain) Carlos Sainz	(Spain) Lucas Cruz	1
Audi	RS Q e-tron	(Germany) Team Audi Sport	(Sweden) Mattias Ekström	(Sweden) Emil Bergkvist	1
Ford	Raptor RS Cross Country	(Czech Republic) Orlen Jipocar Team	(Czech Republic) Martin Prokop	(Czech Republic) Viktor Chytka	1–2
MD	MD Rallye Sport Optimus	(France) JLC Racing	(France) Jean-Luc Ceccaldi	(France) Thomas Gaidella	1
Mini	John Cooper Works Plus	(Germany) X-Raid Mini JCW Team	(Poland) Krzysztof Hołowczyc	(Poland) Łukasz Kurzeja	1
Mini	John Cooper Works Plus	(Germany) X-Raid Mini JCW Team	(Spain) Pau Navarro	(Portugal) Gonçalo Reis	1
Mini	John Cooper Works Plus	(Germany) X-Raid Mini JCW Team	(Spain) Pau Navarro	(Germany) Andreas Schulz	2
Prodrive	Hunter T1+	(Qatar) Nasser Racing	(Qatar) Nasser Al-Attiyah	(France) Mathieu Baumel	1
Prodrive	Hunter T1+	(Qatar) Nasser Racing	(Qatar) Nasser Al-Attiyah	(France) Édouard Boulanger	2–5
Prodrive	Hunter T1+	(Brazil) X Rally	(Brazil) Marcos Baumgart	(Brazil) Kleber Cincea	All
Prodrive	Hunter T1+	(Brazil) X Rally	(Brazil) Cristian Baumgart	(Brazil) Alberto Andreotti	All
Revo+	Red-Lined Revo+	(United Arab Emirates) Buggyra ZM Racing	(Seychelles) Aliyyah Koloc	(France) Sébastien Delaunay	1–3
Toyota	Hilux Overdrive	(Belgium) Overdrive Racing	(Saudi Arabia) Yazeed Al-Rajhi	(Germany) Timo Gottschalk	All
Toyota	Hilux Overdrive	(Belgium) Overdrive Racing	(Argentina) Juan Cruz Yacopini	(Spain) Daniel Oliveras	1–2
Toyota	Hilux Overdrive	(Belgium) Overdrive Racing	(France) Guerlain Chicherit	(France) Alex Winocq	1–3, 5
Toyota	Hilux Overdrive	(Belgium) Overdrive Racing	(Kyrgyzstan) Denis Krotov	Konstantin Zhiltsov	All
Toyota	Hilux Overdrive	(Belgium) Overdrive Racing	(Belgium) Guillaume De Mévius	(France) Xavier Panseri	1–3, 5
Toyota	Hilux Overdrive	(Belgium) Overdrive Racing	(France) Lionel Baud	(France) Lucie Baud	1–3
Toyota	GR DKR Hilux	Toyota Gazoo Racing South Africa	(Brazil) Lucas Moraes	(Spain) Armand Monleón	All
Toyota	GR DKR Hilux	Toyota Gazoo Racing South Africa	(United States) Seth Quintero	(Germany) Dennis Zenz	All
Toyota	GR DKR Hilux	Toyota Gazoo Racing South Africa	(South Africa) Saood Variawa	(France) François Cazalet	1–3
Challenger Teams & Drivers
Constructor	Vehicle	Team	Driver	Co-driver	Rounds
Can-Am	Maverick XRS Turbo	Can-Am Factory Team	(Lithuania) Rokas Baciuška	(Spain) Oriol Vidal Montjiano	All
Can-Am	Maverick XRS Turbo	Can-Am Factory Team	(United States) Austin Jones	(Brazil) Gustavo Gugelmin	1–3
Can-Am	Maverick XRS Turbo	South Racing Can-Am	(Argentina) Nicolás Cavigliasso	(Argentina) Valentina Pertegarini	All
Can-Am	Maverick XRS Turbo	South Racing Can-Am	(Argentina) David Zille	(Argentina) Sebastian Cesana	1, 4
Can-Am	MMP T3 Rally-Raid	Ricardo Porem	(Portugal) Ricardo Porem	(Argentina) Augusto Sanz	1, 3
Taurus	T3 Max	Energylandia Rally Team	(Poland) Eryk Goczał	(Spain) Oriol Mena	1
Taurus	T3 Max	Energylandia Rally Team	(Poland) Marek Goczał	(Poland) Maciej Marton	1
Taurus	T3 Max	Red Bull Off-Road Jr Team USA by BFG	(United States) Mitchell Guthrie	(United States) Kellon Walch	1
Taurus	T3 Max	Marcelo Tiglia Gastaldi	(Brazil) Marcelo Tiglia Gastaldi	(Brazil) Carlos Sachs	All
Taurus	T3 Max	Wevers Sport	(Saudi Arabia) Dania Akeel	(France) Stéphane Dupre	All
Yamaha	YXZ 1000R	Mario Franco	(Portugal) Mario Franco	(Portugal) Daniel Jordão	1, 3
SSV Teams & Drivers
Constructor	Vehicle	Team	Driver	Co-driver	Rounds
Can-Am	Maverick XRS Turbo	Andre Thewessen	(Netherlands) Andre Thewessen	(Ukraine) Dmytro Tsyro	1
Can-Am	Maverick XRS Turbo	Can-Am Factory Team	(Portugal) João Ferreira	(Portugal) Filipe Palmeiro	1
Can-Am	Maverick XRS Turbo	Can-Am Factory Team	(France) Claude Fornier	(France) Serge Gounon	1
Can-Am	Maverick XRS Turbo	FN Speed Team	(Ecuador) Sebastian Guayasamin	(Argentina) Fernando Matías Acosta	1
Can-Am	Maverick XRS Turbo	OnlyFans Racing	(Italy) Rebecca Busi	(Uruguay) Sergio Lafuente	1
Can-Am	Maverick XRS Turbo	Ricardo Ramilo Suarez	(Spain) Ricardo Ramilo Suarez	(Spain) Arnau Lledo	1
Can-Am	Maverick XRS Turbo	South Racing Can-Am	(Spain) Eduardo Pons Sune	(Spain) Juame Betriu	1
Can-Am	Maverick XRS Turbo	South Racing Can-Am	(Brazil) Cristiano Bautista	(Spain) Fausto Mota	1
Can-Am	Maverick XRS Turbo	South Racing Can-Am	(United States) Sara Price	(United States) Jeremy Gray	1
Can-Am	Maverick XRS Turbo	Yasir Seidan	(Saudi Arabia) Yasir Seidan	(France) Adrien Metge	1
Polaris	RZR Pro R	Michele Antonio Cinotto	(Italy) Michele Antonio Cinotto	(Italy) Alberto Bertoldi	1
Polaris	RZR Pro R	TH Trucks Team	(Italy) Enrico Gaspari	(Argentina) Facundo Jaton	1

=== Results ===
Round	Rally name	FIA World Rally-Raid Championship results				Report
Round	Rally name	Rank	Ultimate	Challenger	SSV	Report
1	(Saudi Arabia) Dakar Rally	1	(Spain) Carlos Sainz (Spain) Lucas Cruz; Audi RS Q e-tron (48h15m18s)	(Spain) Cristina Gutiérrez (Spain) Pablo Moreno Huete; Taurus T3 Max (53h59m47s)	(France) Xavier de Soultrait (France) Martin Bonnet; Polaris RZR Pro R (56h37m43m)	report
1	(Saudi Arabia) Dakar Rally	2	(Belgium) Guillaume De Mévius (France) Xavier Panseri; Toyota Hilux Overdrive (49h35m43m)	(United States) Mitchell Guthrie (United States) Kellon Walch; Taurus T3 Max (54h36m33s)	(Switzerland) Jérôme de Sadeleer (France) Michaël Metge; Can-Am Maverick XRS Turbo (56h40m08s)	report
1	(Saudi Arabia) Dakar Rally	3	(France) Sébastien Loeb (France) Fabian Lurquin; Prodrive Hunter T1+ (49h44m30s)	(Lithuania) Rokas Baciuška (Spain) Oriol Vidal Montijano; Can-Am Maverick XRS Turbo (54h58m34s)	(Saudi Arabia) Yasir Seidan (France) Adrien Metge; Can-Am Maverick XRS Turbo (57h42m11s)	report
2	(United Arab Emirates) Abu Dhabi Desert Challenge	1	(Qatar) Nasser Al-Attiyah (France) Édouard Boulanger; Prodrive Hunter T1+ (16h20m09s)	(United States) Austin Jones (Brazil) Gustavo Gugelmin; Can-Am Maverick XRS Turbo (17h10m50s)	(United Arab Emirates) Mansour Al Helei (United Arab Emirates) Khalid Alkendi; Can-Am Maverick XRS Turbo (17h42m37s)	
2	(United Arab Emirates) Abu Dhabi Desert Challenge	2	(Saudi Arabia) Yazeed Al-Rajhi (Germany) Timo Gottschalk; Toyota Hilux Overdrive (16h36m34s)	(Lithuania) Rokas Baciuška (Spain) Oriol Vidal Montijano; Can-Am Maverick XRS Turbo (17h15m28s)	(Saudi Arabia) Yasir Seidan (France) Adrien Metge; Can-Am Maverick XRS Turbo (17h45m19s)	
2	(United Arab Emirates) Abu Dhabi Desert Challenge	3	(United States) Seth Quintero (Germany) Dennis Zenz; Toyota Hilux Overdrive (16h47m55s)	(Chile) Hernan Garces Echeverria (Chile) Juan Pablo Latrach Vinagre; Can-Am Maverick XRS Turbo (17h57m02s)	(Ecuador) Sebastian Guayasamin (Argentina) Fernando Matías Acosta; Can-Am Maverick XRS Turbo (18h18m49s)	
3	BP Ultimate Rally-Raid Portugal	1	(Qatar) Nasser Al-Attiyah (France) Édouard Boulanger; Prodrive Hunter T1+ (10h02m57s)	(Lithuania) Rokas Baciuška (Spain) Oriol Vidal; Can-Am Maverick XRS Turbo (10h23m30s)	(Portugal) João Monteiro (Portugal) Nuno Morais; Can-Am Maverick XRS Turbo (10h50m31s)	
3	BP Ultimate Rally-Raid Portugal	2	(Portugal) João Ferreira (Portugal) Filipe Palmeiro; Mini John Cooper Works Plus (10h05m46s)	(Portugal) Armindo Araújo (Portugal) Pedro Ré; Can-Am Maverick XRS Turbo (10h31m14s)	(Spain) Ricardo Ramilo Suarez (Portugal) Fausto Mota; Can-Am Maverick XRS Turbo (11h03m50s)	
3	BP Ultimate Rally-Raid Portugal	3	(Brazil) Lucas Moraes (Spain) Armand Monleón; Toyota Hilux Overdrive (10h06m33s)	(Argentina) Nicolás Cavigliasso (Argentina) Valentina Pertegarini; Taurus T3 Max (10h31m52s)	(Portugal) Rui Sepra (Portugal) Rui Pita; Can-Am Maverick XRS Turbo (11h14m08s)	
4	(Argentina) Desafío Ruta 40	1	(Saudi Arabia) Yazeed Al-Rajhi (Germany) Timo Gottschalk; Toyota Hilux Overdrive (17h38m21s)	(Lithuania) Rokas Baciuška (France) Sebastien Delaunay; Can-Am Maverick XRS Turbo (18h54m59s)	(Spain) Ricardo Ramilo Suarez (Spain) Fausto Miguel de Almeida Mota; Can-Am Maverick XRS Turbo (20h35m43s)	
4	(Argentina) Desafío Ruta 40	2	(Qatar) Nasser Al-Attiyah (France) Édouard Boulanger; Prodrive Hunter T1+ (17h39m01s)	(Argentina) Nicolás Cavigliasso (Argentina) Valentina Pertegarini; Taurus T3 Max (19h03m48s)	(Ecuador) Sebastian Guayasamin (Argentina) Fernando Matías Acosta; Can-Am Maverick XRS Turbo (20h47m45s)	
4	(Argentina) Desafío Ruta 40	3	(Argentina) Sebastian Halpern (Argentina) Bernardo Graue; Mini John Cooper Works Plus (18h24m37s)	(Saudi Arabia) Dania Akeel (France) Stéphane Dupre; Taurus T3 Max (19h16m43s)	(Italy) Rebecca Busi (Uruguay) Sergio Lafuente; Can-Am Maverick XRS Turbo (20h47m50s)	
5	(Morocco) Rallye du Maroc	1	(Qatar) Nasser Al-Attiyah (France) Édouard Boulanger; Dacia Sandrider (14h26m34s)	(Poland) Eryk Goczał (Spain) Alex Haro; Taurus T3 Max (15h14m11s)	(Saudi Arabia) Yasir Seaidan (France) Michaël Metge; Can-Am Maverick XRS Turbo (17h19m00s)	
5	(Morocco) Rallye du Maroc	2	(France) Sébastien Loeb (France) Fabian Lurquin; Dacia Sandrider (14h31m44s)	(Poland) Marek Goczał (Poland) Maciej Marton; Taurus T3 Max (15h24m02s)	(Portugal) Alexandre Pinto (Portugal) Bernardo Oliveira; Can-Am Maverick XRS Turbo RR (17h29m38s)	
5	(Morocco) Rallye du Maroc	3	(Belgium) Guillaume De Mévius (France) Mathieu Baumel; Mini John Cooper Works (14h40m19m)	(Saudi Arabia) Dania Akeel (France) Stéphane Dupre; Taurus T3 Max (15h41m32s)	(Ecuador) Sebastian Guayasamin (Argentina) Fernando Matías Acosta; Can-Am Maverick XRS Turbo (17h44m38s)	

=== World Drivers' and Co-Drivers' championships ===
The driver who records a points-scoring classification would be taken into account for the championship regardless of the categories.

Pos.	Driver	DAK (Saudi Arabia)	ABU (United Arab Emirates)	PRT (Portugal)	DES (Argentina)	MOR (Morocco)	Points
1	(Qatar) Nasser Al-Attiyah	Ret^{18}	1^{49}	1^{45}	2^{44}	1^{46}	202
2	(Saudi Arabia) Yazeed Al-Rajhi	Ret^{14}	2^{37}	5^{28}	1^{52}	4^{29}	160
3	(Brazil) Lucas Moraes	9^{40}	Ret^{5}	3^{31}	5^{27}	14^{14}	117
4	(Spain) Carlos Sainz Sr.	1^{76}		4^{24}		Ret	100
4	(Belgium) Guillaume De Mévius	2^{58}	Ret^{4}	54^{3}		3^{35}	100
6	(United States) Seth Quintero	101^{5}	3^{30}	43^{4}	11^{16}	5^{26}	81
7	(France) Guerlain Chicherit	4^{56}	Ret^{8}	Ret^{5}		Ret	69
8	(Lithuania) Rokas Baciuška	21^{9}	5^{17}	6^{17}	6^{17}	Ret	60
9	(Kyrgyzstan) Denis Krotov	11^{18}	14^{8}	42	4^{18}	8^{15}	59
10	(Czech Republic) Martin Prokop	5^{27}	21^{9}			6^{15}	51
11	(Portugal) João Ferreira	44	DSQ	2^{34}		11^{10}	44
12	(Brazil) Cristian Baumgart	13^{16}	Ret	7^{11}	10^{7}		34
13	(United States) Austin Jones	23^{7}	4^{19}	13^{7}			33
14	(France) Mathieu Serradori	10^{32}					32
15	(Argentina) Nicolás Cavigliasso	40	27	10^{11}	7^{12}	13^{5}	28
16	(Argentina) Juan Cruz Yacopini	28^{11}	DSQ	14^{6}	Ret	10^{8}	25
17	(Argentina) Sebastian Halpern				3^{24}		24
18	(Saudi Arabia) Dania Akeel	117	15^{4}	25^{3}	8^{9}	12^{6}	22
19	(South Africa) Saood Variawa	17^{14}	10^{8}	Ret			22
20	(Brazil) Marcos Baumgart	Ret	6^{14}	Ret^{1}	Ret	15^{3}	17
21	(Saudi Arabia) Yasir Seidan	29^{5}	8^{11}	Ret	Ret	30	16
22	(Sweden) Mattias Ekström	48^{15}				Ret	15
23	(Poland) Eryk Goczał	DSQ				7^{14}	14
24	(United States) Mitch Guthrie	19^{11}				16^{2}	13
25	(France) Stéphane Peterhansel	55^{13}					13
26	(Ecuador) Sebastian Guayasamin	39	12^{7}	58	15^{4}	35	11
27	(Brazil) Marcelo Gastaldi	31	17^{2}	37	9^{8}	80	10
28	(Spain) Pau Navarro	Ret	9^{9}			23	9
29	(Poland) Marek Goczał	Ret				9^{9}	9
30	(Spain) Ricardo Ramilo Suarez	64	29	19^{4}	13^{5}	Ret	9
31	(Portugal) Ricardo Porém	34		11^{8}		Ret	8
32	(Italy) Rebecca Busi	104	16^{3}	29^{2}	16^{3}	37	8
33	(Seychelles) Aliyyah Koloc	47	13^{6}	Ret		Ret	6
34	(Portugal) Mário Franco	95		15^{5}		Ret	5
35	(Italy) Eugenio Amos	57^{4}		55		26	4
36	(United States) Sara Price	30^{4}	WD				4
37	(Poland) Krzysztof Hołowczyc	121^{3}					3
38	(France) Claude Fournier		23	45	17^{2}	69	2
39	(Poland) Michał Goczał	DSQ				79^{2}	2
40	(France) Lionel Baud	36	28	53^{1}		22	1
-	(France) Jean-Luc Ceccaldi	99				Ret	0
Drivers ineligible for championship points
–	(France) Sébastien Loeb	3		22		2	–
–	(South Africa) Giniel de Villiers	7					–
–	(United Arab Emirates) Mansour Al Helei		7				–
–	(Lithuania) Benediktas Vanagas	8					–
–	(Chile) Hernan Garces Echeverria		11				–
–	(Argentina) Hernan Garces				12	24	–
–	(Chile) Lucas del Rio				14		–
–	(France) Christian Lavieille	12				46	–
–	(France) Romain Dumas	14					–
–	(Spain) Laia Sanz	15					–
Pos.	Driver	DAK (Saudi Arabia)	ABU (United Arab Emirates)	PRT (Portugal)	DES (Argentina)	MOR (Morocco)	Points

Pos.	Driver	DAK (Saudi Arabia)	ABU (United Arab Emirates)	PRT (Portugal)	DES (Argentina)	MOR (Morocco)	Points
1	(France) Édouard Boulanger	55^{13}	1^{49}	1^{45}	2^{44}	1^{46}	197
2	(Germany) Timo Gottschalk	Ret^{14}	2^{37}	5^{28}	1^{52}	4^{29}	160
3	(Spain) Armand Monleón	9^{40}	Ret^{5}	3^{31}	5^{27}	14^{14}	117
4	(Germany) Dennis Zenz	101^{5}	3^{30}	43^{4}	11^{16}	5^{26}	81
5	(Spain) Lucas Cruz	1^{76}					76
6	(France) Xavier Panseri	2^{58}	Ret^{4}	54^{3}			65
7	(France) Alexandre Winocq	4^{56}	Ret^{8}			Ret	64
8	Konstantin Zhiltsov	11^{18}	14^{8}	42	4^{18}	8^{15}	59
9	(France) Mathieu Baumel	Ret^{18}		Ret^{5}		3^{35}	58
10	(Czech Republic) Viktor Chytka	5^{27}	21^{9}			6^{15}	51
11	(Portugal) Filipe Palmeiro	44	DSQ	2^{34}		11^{10}	44
12	(Spain) Oriol Vidal Montijano	21^{9}	5^{17}	6^{17}			43
13	(Spain) Alex Haro			4^{24}		7^{14}	38
14	(France) Loïc Minaudier	10^{32}					32
15	(Argentina) Valentina Pertegarini	40	27	10^{11}	7^{12}	13^{5}	28
16	(Spain) Oriol Mena	Ret	4^{19}	13^{7}			26
17	(Brazil) Gustavo Gugelmin	23^{7}		7^{11}	10^{7}		25
18	(Argentina) Daniel Oliveras Carreras	28^{11}	DSQ	14^{6}	Ret	10^{8}	25
19	(Argentina) Bernardo Graue				3^{24}		24
20	(France) Sébastien Delaunay	47	13^{6}	Ret	6^{17}	Ret	24
21	(France) Stéphane Duplé	117	15^{4}	25^{3}	8^{9}	12^{6}	22
22	(France) François Cazalet	17^{14}	10^{8}	Ret			22
23	(Brazil) Kleber Cincea	Ret	6^{14}	Ret	Ret	15^{3}	17
24	(Brazil) Alberto Andreotti	13^{16}	Ret	Ret			16
25	(Sweden) Emil Bergkvist	48^{15}					15
26	(United States) Kellon Walch	19^{11}				16^{2}	13
27	(France) Michaël Metge		8^{11}	Ret	Ret	30	11
28	(Argentina) Fernando Acosta	39	12^{7}	58	15^{4}	35	11
29	(Brazil) Carlos Sachs	31	17^{2}	37	9^{8}	80	10
30	(Germany) Andreas Schulz	Ret	9^{9}				9
=	(Poland) Maciej Marton	Ret				9^{9}	9
32	(Spain) Fausto Mota	64	29	19^{4}	13^{5}	Ret	9
33	(Portugal) Luís Marques			11^{8}			8
34	(Uruguay) Sergio Lafuente	104	16^{3}	29^{2}	16^{3}	37	8
35	(Portugal) João Serôdio			15^{5}			5
36	(France) Adrien Metge	29^{5}					5
37	(United States) Jeremy Gray	30^{4}	WD				4
38	(Italy) Pablo Ceci	57^{4}		55		26	4
39	(Poland) Lukasz Kurzeja	121^{3}					3
40	(France) Serge Gounon		23	45	17^{2}	69	2
41	(Spain) Diego Ortega Gil	DSQ				79^{2}	2
42	(France) Lucie Baud	36	28	53^{1}		22	1
Pos.	Driver	DAK (Saudi Arabia)	ABU (United Arab Emirates)	PRT (Portugal)	DES (Argentina)	MOR (Morocco)	Points

=== Challenger Drivers' and Co-Drivers' championships ===
Pos.	Driver	DAK (Saudi Arabia)	ABU (United Arab Emirates)	PRT (Portugal)	DES (Argentina)	MOR (Morocco)	Points
1	(Lithuania) Rokas Baciuška	3^{68}	2^{46}	1^{46}	1^{49}	Ret	209
2	(Argentina) Nicolás Cavigliasso	9^{50}	7^{30}	3^{42}	2^{44}	4^{22}	187
3	(Brazil) Marcelo Gastaldi	7^{52}	5^{25}	18^{20}	4^{33}	23^{13}	143
4	(United States) Austin Jones	5^{48}	1^{52}	6^{26}			126
5	(Saudi Arabia) Dania Akeel	27^{22}	4^{29}	13^{13}	3^{34}	3^{26}	124
6	(United States) Mitch Guthrie	2^{85}				5^{27}	112
7	(Portugal) Ricardo Porém	8^{32}		4^{32}		Ret	64
8	(Poland) Eryk Goczał	DSQ				1^{48}	48
9	(Portugal) Mário Franco	25^{20}		7^{27}		Ret	47
10	(Argentina) David Zille	28^{19}			10^{21}		40
11	(Poland) Marek Goczał	Ret				2^{39}	39
12	(Poland) Michał Goczał	DSQ				22^{27}	27
13	(France) Lionel Baud					8^{13}	13
Drivers ineligible for championship points
–	(Spain) Cristina Gutiérrez	1	10	Ret			–
–	(Portugal) Armindo Araújo			2			–
–	(Chile) Hernan Garces Echeverria		3	10			–
–	(Chile) Francisco López Contardo	4					–
–	(Portugal) Alexandre Pinto			5			–
–	(Argentina) Hernan Garces				5		–
–	(Saudi Arabia) Saleh Alsaif	6					–
–	(Germany) Annett Quandt	19	6				–
–	(Chile) Lucas del Rio				6		–
–	(Portugal) Rui Carneiro			25		6	–
–	(Portugal) Joao Dias			8		7	–
–	(Uruguay) Nadia Lafuente				7		–
–	(Netherlands) Puck Klaasen		8	24	Ret	Ret	–
–	(Chile) Juan Carlos Cerda Araya				8		–
–	(Hungary) Pál Lonyai		9			13	–
–	(Portugal) Hélder Rodrigues			9			–
–	(Paraguay) Oscar Santos				9		–
–	(Chile) Emilio Fernandez					9	–
–	(Netherlands) Paul Spierings	10					–
–	(France) Alexandre Giroud					10	–
–	(Paraguay) Oscar Santos Peralta	11					–
–	(United Arab Emirates) Khalid Aljafla		11				–
–	(France) Sébastien Loeb			11			–
–	(Argentina) Nazareno López				11		–
–	(Qatar) Abdulaziz Al-Kuwari					11	–
–	(Spain) Pedro Manuel Peñate Muñoz	12					–
–	(Spain) Laia Sanz		12				–
–	(Belgium) Ghislain De Mévius			12			–
–	(Netherlands) Hans Weijs					12	–
–	(Portugal) João Monteiro	13					–
–	(France) Christophe Cresp	14					–
–	(Portugal) Pedro Gonçalves			14		Ret	–
–	(Spain) Oscar Olivas					14	–
–	(Portugal) Nuno Rogério			15			–
–	(United Kingdom) Richard Aczel					15	–
–	(Austria) Lukas Lauda	15					–
–	(Spain) Óscar Ral Verdú	16		23		Ret	–
–	(Portugal) Marco Pereira			16			–
–	(Spain) Joan Piferrer					16	–
–	(Italy) Camelia Liparoti	17					–
–	(Portugal) Paulo Jorge Rodrigues			17			–
–	(Luxembourg) Charles Munster					17	–
–	(Spain) Xavier Foj	18					–
–	(Netherlands) Riné Streppel					18	–
–	(United Kingdom) William Buller			19			–
–	(France) Louis Baudrand					19	–
–	(Netherlands) Gert-Jan Van Der Valk	20					–
–	(Portugal) Luís Portela Morais			20			–
–	(United States) Craig Lumsden					20	–
–	(Colombia) Javier Vélez	21					–
–	(Portugal) Sérgio Vitorino			21			–
–	(Morocco) Jawhara Bennani					21	–
–	(Brazil) Gunter Hinkelmann	22					–
–	(Portugal) Francisco Guedes			22			–
–	(Netherlands) Jeffrey Otten	23					–
–	(France) Benjamin Lattard	24					–
–	(Netherlands) Lex Peters					24	–
–	(Qatar) Khalifa Al-Attiyah					25	–
–	(Australia) Glenn Brinkman	26					–
–	(Portugal) Ricardo Sousa			26			–
–	(Poland) Adam Kuś					26	–
–	(France) Francis Balocchi					27	–
–	(United States) Zach Lumsden					28	–
–	(United States) Lawrence Janesky					29	–
–	(France) Aurélien Bouchet					30	–
–	(Qatar) Ahmed Alkuwari					31	–
–	(United Arab Emirates) Yahya Al-Helei		Ret				–
–	(Portugal) Miguel Barbosa			Ret			–
–	(Spain) Jordi Segura			Ret			–
–	(Portugal) Luís Cidade			Ret			–
–	(Brazil) Adroaldo Weisheimer			Ret			–
–	(Chile) Sandro Peppi				Ret		–
–	(Portugal) Maria Gameiro					Ret	–
–	(Spain) Rodrigo Rodriguez Gamboa			WD			–
Pos.	Driver	DAK (Saudi Arabia)	ABU (United Arab Emirates)	PRT (Portugal)	DES (Argentina)	MOR (Morocco)	Points

Pos.	Driver	DAK (Saudi Arabia)	ABU (United Arab Emirates)	PRT (Portugal)	DES (Argentina)	MOR (Morocco)	Points
1	(Argentina) Valentina Pertegarini	9^{50}	7^{30}	3^{42}	2^{44}	4^{22}	187
2	(Spain) Oriol Vidal Montijano	3^{68}	2^{46}	1^{46}			160
3	(Brazil) Carlos Sachs	7^{52}	5^{25}	18^{20}	4^{33}	23^{13}	143
4	(France) Stéphane Duplé	27^{22}	4^{29}	13^{13}	3^{34}	3^{26}	124
5	(United States) Kellon Walch	2^{85}				5^{27}	112
6	(Spain) Oriol Mena	Ret	1^{52}	6^{26}			78
7	(Spain) Sébastien Delaunay				1^{49}		49
8	(Spain) Alex Haro	DSQ				1^{48}	48
9	(Brazil) Gustavo Gugelmin	5^{48}					48
10	(Argentina) Sebastian Cesana	28^{19}			10^{21}		40
11	(Poland) Maciej Marton	Ret				2^{39}	39
12	(Portugal) Luís Marques			4^{32}			32
13	(Argentina) Augusto Sanz	8^{32}					32
14	(Portugal) João Serôdio			7^{27}			27
15	(Spain) Diego Ortega Gil	DSQ				22^{27}	27
16	(Portugal) Daniel Jordão	25^{20}					20
17	(France) Lucie Baud					8^{13}	13
Pos.	Driver	DAK (Saudi Arabia)	ABU (United Arab Emirates)	PRT (Portugal)	DES (Argentina)	MOR (Morocco)	Points

=== SSV Drivers' and Co-Drivers' championships ===
Pos.	Driver	DAK (Saudi Arabia)	ABU (United Arab Emirates)	PRT (Portugal)	DES (Argentina)	MOR (Morocco)	Points
1	(Saudi Arabia) Yasir Seidan	3^{91}	2^{55}	Ret^{9}	Ret	1^{53}	208
2	(Ecuador) Sebastian Guayasamin	6^{42}	3^{45}	12^{31}	2^{43}	3^{45}	206
3	(Italy) Rebecca Busi	22^{11}	4^{34}	5^{39}	3^{36}	4^{35}	155
4	(Spain) Ricardo Ramilo Suarez	11^{21}	11^{13}	2^{54}	1^{49}	Ret^{4}	141
5	(France) Claude Fournier		7^{19}	9^{27}	4^{23}	14^{23}	92
6	(Italy) Enrico Gaspari	12^{31}	12^{11}		5^{30}	Ret^{3}	75
7	(United States) Sara Price	4^{74}	WD				74
8	(Portugal) João Ferreira	5^{73}	DSQ				73
9	(Brazil) Cristiano Bautista	7^{52}					52
10	(Italy) Michele Antonio Cinotto		5^{22}				22
11	(Spain) Eduardo Pons	16^{16}					16
12	(Netherlands) Andre Thewessen	17^{13}					13
Drivers ineligible for championship points
–	(France) Xavier de Soultrait	1					–
–	(United Arab Emirates) Mansour Al Helei		1				–
–	(Portugal) João Monteiro			1			–
–	(Switzerland) Jérôme de Sadeleer	2					–
–	(Portugal) Alexandre Pinto					2	–
–	(Portugal) Rui Serpa			3			–
–	(Portugal) Ruben Jorge Rodrigues			4			–
–	(United Kingdom) Paul Severn					5	–
–	(Lithuania) Justas Grendelis		6				–
–	(Portugal) Filipe Manuel Aniceto Lopes			6			–
–	(Spain) Fidel Castillo					6	–
–	(Brazil) Reinaldo Varela			7			–
–	(Spain) Alexander Toril					7	–
–	(Spain) Gerard Farrés	8					–
–	(Poland) Piotr Beaupre		8				–
–	(Portugal) Vítor da Silva Moutinho			8			–
–	(Portugal) Francisco Guedes					8	–
–	(Lithuania) Emilija Gelažninkienė	9					–
–	(Italy) Pietro Cinotto		9				–
–	(Poland) Grzegorz Brochocki					9	–
–	(France) Florent Vayssade	10					–
–	(Poland) Robert Szustkowski		10				–
–	(France) Adrien Choblet			10			–
–	(Italy) Andrea Schiumarini					10	–
–	(Portugal) José Óscar Nogueira			11		21	–
–	(Spain) Juan Manuel Maña					11	–
–	(United States) Pablo Copetti					12	–
–	(Italy) Cristina Giampaoli	13					–
–	(United Arab Emirates) Atif Alzarouni		13				–
–	(Portugal) José Morgado			13			–
–	(France) Gauthier Honvault					13	–
–	(Brazil) Jorge Wagernfuhr	14					–
–	(Netherlands) Martijn van den Broek	15					–
–	(France) William Grarre					15	–
–	(France) Bertrand Honvault					16	–
–	(Spain) Domingo Román					17	–
–	(France) Jérémie Renou	18					–
–	(Belgium) Michaël Devos					18	–
–	(Mexico) Daniel Gonzalez Reina	19					–
–	(Poland) Aleksander Szustkowski					19	–
–	(Japan) Shinsuke Umeda	20					–
–	(France) Adrien Choblet					20	–
–	(Netherlands) Sander Derikx	21					–
–	(Spain) José Ignacio Gayoso					22	–
–	(France) Benoît Lepietre	23					–
–	(Brazil) Rodrigo Varela	24					–
–	(Poland) Grzegorz Brochocki	25					–
–	(Spain) Jose Vidaña	26					–
–	(Spain) Alexander Toril Boquoi			Ret			–
–	(Spain) Miguel Toril Boquoi			Ret			–
–	(Portugal) João Paula			Ret			–
–	(France) Jeremie Renou			Ret			–
–	(Portugal) Gonçalo Guerreiro			Ret			–
–	(Portugal) Hélder Rodrigues					Ret	–
–	(Netherlands) Erik Van Loon					Ret	–
–	(Netherlands) Roger Grouwels					Ret	–
–	(Spain) Juan Miguel Fidel					Ret	–
–	(France) Jérôme Daniel					Ret	–
–	(Spain) Carlos Vento					Ret	–
–	(France) Jérémie Renou					Ret	–
Pos.	Driver	DAK (Saudi Arabia)	ABU (United Arab Emirates)	PRT (Portugal)	DES (Argentina)	MOR (Morocco)	Points

== FIM World Rally-Raid Championship ==
=== Bikes Drivers' championships ===
Pos.	Driver	DAK (Saudi Arabia)	ABU (United Arab Emirates)	PRT (Portugal)	DES (Argentina)	MOR (Morocco)	Points
1	(Botswana) Ross Branch	2.º	2.º	5.º	5.º	3.º	88
2	(France) Adrien van Beveren	3.º	Ret.	3.º	3.º	2.º	76
3	(Spain) Tosha Schareina	Ret.	-	1.º	2.º	1.º	70
4	(United States) Ricky Brabec	1.º	Ret.	Ret.	1.º	Ret.	63
5	(Chile) José Ignacio Cornejo	4.º	Ret.	Ret.	8.º	4.º	41
6	(Chile) Pablo Quintanilla	5.º	Ret.	6.º	6.º	Ret.	37
7	(Germany) Sebastian Bühler	Ret.	Ret.	2.º	7.º	Ret.	29
8	(United States) Skyler Howes	Ret.	Ret.	4.º	4.º	Ret.	26
9	(South Africa) Aaron Maré	Ret.	1.º	-	Ret	Ret.	25

=== Quads Drivers' championships ===
Pos.	Driver	DAK (Saudi Arabia)	ABU (United Arab Emirates)	PRT (Portugal)	DES (Argentina)	MOR (Morocco)	Points
1	(Argentina) Manuel Andújar	1^{38}	Ret.	4^{13}	1^{25}	-	76
2	(Poland) Kamil Wiśniewski	-	-	1^{25}	2^{20}	2^{20}	65
3	(Lithuania) Antonas Kanopkinas	5^{17}	Ret.	2^{20}	Ret.	1^{25}	62
4	(Saudi Arabia) Hani Alnoumesi	7^{14}	2^{20}	Ret.	6^{10}	3^{16}	60
5	(France) Alexandre Giroud	2^{30}	Ret.	-	-	-	30
6	(United Arab Emirates) Abdulaziz Ahli	-	1^{25}	-	-	-	25
7	(Slovakia) Juraj Varga	3^{24}	Ret.	-	-	Ret.	24
8	(Lithuania) Laisvydas Kancius	4^{20}	-	-	-	-	20
9	(France) Gaetan Martinez	-	3^{16}	-	-	-	16
9	(Bolivia) Suany Martinez	-	-	-	3^{16}	-	16
