= Bahrain Raid Xtreme =

Bahraini World Rally-Raid Championship team

- Founded: June 15, 2020
- Founder(s): Mumtalakat Holding Company; David Richards
- Team principal(s): Gus Beteli
- Current series: World Rally-Raid Championship
- Current drivers: (France) Sebastien Loeb (Argentina) Orlando Terranova (Spain) Nani Roma
- Teams' Championships: 0
- Drivers' Championships: 0
- Website: https://www.bahrainraidxtreme.com

Bahrain Raid Xtreme also known as BRX is a rally raid team that participates in the World Rally-Raid Championship (W2RC) and the Dakar Rally.

== History ==
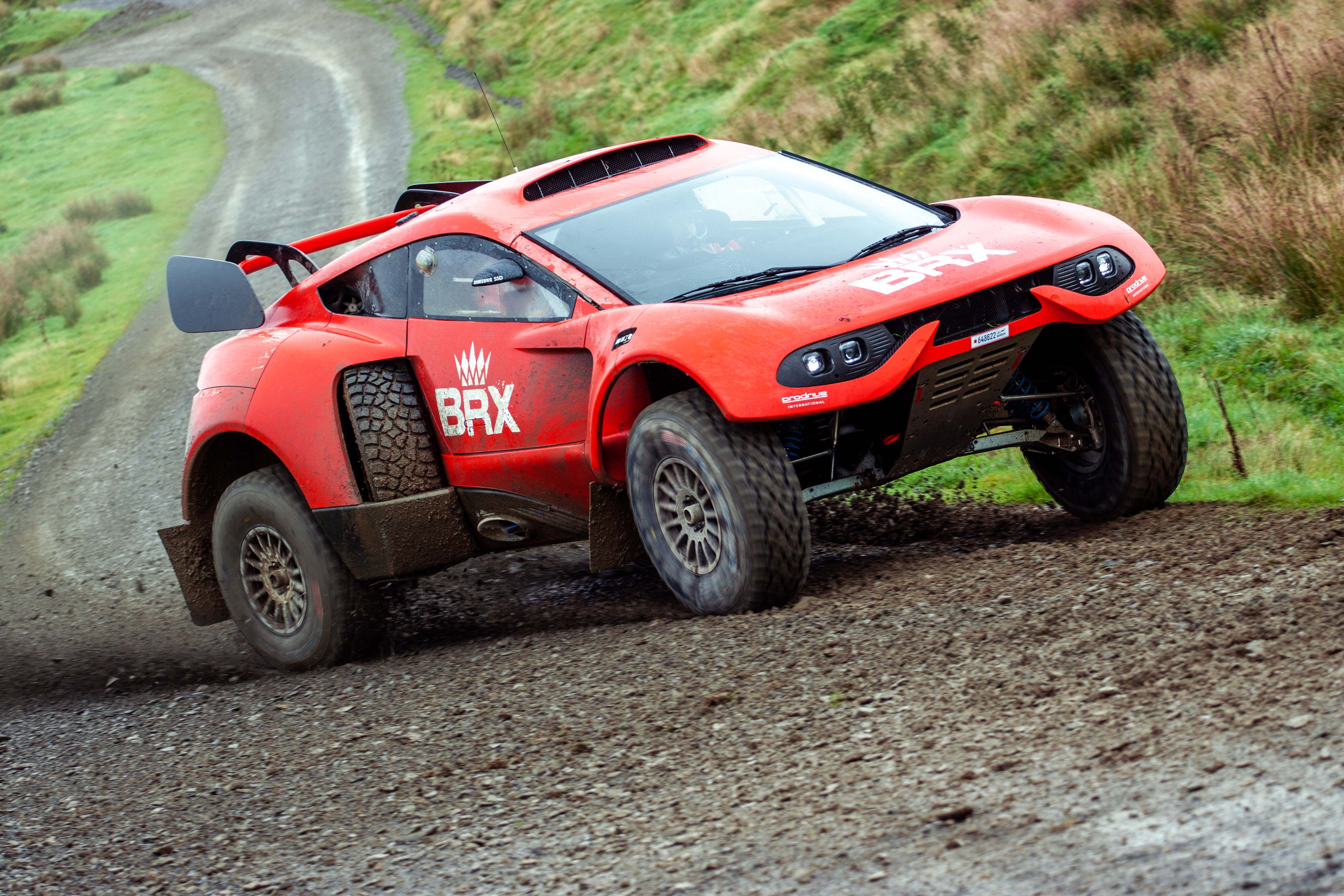
Nani Roma Driving the Prodrive BRX Hunter in October 2021

On June 15, 2020, the Kingdom of Bahrain's plans for launching the team were revealed. The team was founded by the Bahrain's sovereign wealth fund Mumtalakat Holding Company, which entered a partnership with the British team Prodrive and together they established Prodrive International in a joint venture.

BRX is directed by David Richards and Gus Beteli is the team principal.

=== 2021 ===
BRX made their debut at the 2021 Dakar Rally with Drivers Sébastien Loeb and Nani Roma, driving the Prodrive BRX Hunter. Loeb did not finish the event while Roma was 5th in the T1 cars Category.

=== 2022 ===
BRX made their debut in the inaugural World Rally-Raid Championship (W2RC).

At the 2022 Dakar Rally Loeb finished 2nd while Terranova finished 4th and Roma finished 21st.

Fighting for points in the W2RC, Loeb participated in the Abu Dhabi Desert Challenge and took the points lead at 112 points from Nasser Al-Attiyah at a 111 points.

=== 2023 ===
BRX continued their participation in the World Rally-Raid Championship (W2RC), fielding updated Hunters for Sebastien Loeb and Orlando Terranova. The team also operated a Hunter for Guerlain Chicherit, entered into the W2RC under the GC Kompetition banner. Vaidotas Žala was also added as a customer for the 2023 Dakar under the Teltonika Racing banner.

At the 2023 Dakar, Loeb finished 2nd and Chicherit ended up 10th overall. Terranova retired after aggravating an earlier back injury, while Zala was forced to exit with mechanical issues. Loeb won 7 stages and set a record for the most consecutive stage wins in Dakar history, with 6 stage wins from stage 8 to stage 13 and Chicherit added to the tally with 2 stage wins. However, the Hunter was beset by a propensity for punctures - with heavy time losses for all Hunter crews on the rocky stage 2 - and many mechanical issues throughout the rally, prevented a proper shot at the top step of the podium, with Loeb's final deficit to the winner being 1 hour, 20 minutes & 49 seconds.

== Results ==
=== Complete World Rally-raid Championship results ===
(key)

Year	Car	Class	Driver	1	2	3	4	5	Pos.	Points
2022	Prodrive BRX Hunter T1+	T1	(France) Sébastien Loeb	DAK; 2	ABU; 6	AND; 22	MOR; 1st		2nd	149
2022	Prodrive BRX Hunter T1+	T1	(Spain) Nani Roma	DAK; 36	ABU	AND	MOR		16th	18
2023	Prodrive BRX Hunter T1+	T1	(France) Sébastien Loeb	DAK; 2	ABU	SON	DES	MOR	1st*	89*
2023	Prodrive BRX Hunter T1+	T1	(Argentina) Orlando Terranova	DAK; Ret	ABU	SON	DES	MOR	NC*	NC*
2023	Prodrive BRX Hunter T1+	T1	(France) Guerlain Chicherit	DAK; 7	ABU	SON	DES	MOR	3rd*	49*

*Season still in progress

Roma withdrew from the 2022 World Rally-Raid Championship due to health issues. Terranova retired from the 2023 Dakar Rally due to aggravating an earlier back injury. Chicherit's Hunter is operated by BRX, but is entered under the GCK Motorsport banner.

=== Complete Dakar Rally results ===
Year	Entrant	Car	Class	No	Driver, Codriver	Pos.	Stg.
2021	Bahrain Raid Extreme	Prodrive BRX Hunter T1	T1.1	305	(France) Sébastien Loeb (Monaco) Daniel Elena	Ret	0
2021	Bahrain Raid Extreme	Prodrive BRX Hunter T1	T1.1	311	(Spain) Nani Roma (France) Alexandre Winocq	5th	0
2022	Bahrain Raid Extreme	Prodrive BRX Hunter T1+	T1.1	204	(Spain) Nani Roma (Spain) Alex Haro Bravo	21st	
2022	Bahrain Raid Extreme	Prodrive BRX Hunter T1+	T1.1	211	(France) Sébastien Loeb (Belgium) Fabian Lurquin	2nd	2
2022	Bahrain Raid Extreme	Prodrive BRX Hunter T1+	T1.1	221	(Argentina) Orlando Terranova (Spain) Daniel Oliveras Carreras	4th	1
2023	Bahrain Raid Extreme	Prodrive BRX Hunter T1+	T1+	201	(France) Sébastien Loeb (Belgium) Fabian Lurquin	2nd	7
2023	Bahrain Raid Extreme	Prodrive BRX Hunter T1+	T1+	208	(Argentina) Orlando Terranova (Spain) Alex Haro Bravo	Ret	0
2023	GCK Motorsport	Prodrive BRX Hunter T1+	T1+	206	(France) Guerlain Chicherit (France) Alex Winocq	10th	2
2023	Teltonika Racing	Prodrive BRX Hunter T1+	T1+	213	(Lithuania) Vaidotas Žala (Portugal) Paulo Fiúza	Ret	0
2024	Nasser Racing	Prodrive BRX Hunter T1+	T1+	200	(Qatar) Nasser Al-Attiyah (France) Mathieu Baumel	*	1*
2024	Bahrain Raid Extreme	Prodrive BRX Hunter T1+	T1+	203	(France) Sébastien Loeb (Belgium) Fabian Lurquin	*	3*
2024	X Rally	Prodrive BRX Hunter T1+	T1+	242	(Brazil) Marcos Baumgart (Brazil) Kleber Cincea	*	0*
2024	X Rally	Prodrive BRX Hunter T1+	T1+	245	(Brazil) Cristian Baumgart (Brazil) Alberto Andreotti	*	0*
2024	Yunxiang China T1+ Team	Prodrive BRX Hunter T1+	T1+	249	(China) Liu Feilong (China) Wang Yicheng	*	0*
2024	Yunxiang China T1+ Team	Prodrive BRX Hunter T1+	T1+	252	(China) Sun Ping (China) Liao Min	*	0*
2024	Yunxiang China T1+ Team	Prodrive BRX Hunter T1+	T1+	254	(China) Zi Yungang (China) Pan Hongyu	*	0*
