= World Rally-Raid Championship =

World rally raid motorsport series

- Category: Rally raid
- Country: International
- Inaugural season: 2022
- Classes: AUTO: T1, T2, T3, T4, T5; MOTO: RallyGP, Rally2, Rally3, Quad
- Drivers' champion: (Brazil) Lucas Moraes (O/A) (Argentina) Nicolás Cavigliasso (Challenger) (Portugal) Alexandre Pinto (SSV)
- Co-Drivers' champion: (France) Édouard Boulanger (O/A) (Argentina) Valentina Pertegarini (Challenger) (Portugal) Bernardo Oliveira (SSV)
- Riders' champion: (Australia) Daniel Sanders (RallyGP) (Spain) Edgar Canet (Rally2) (France) Thomas Zoldos (Rally3) (France) Gaëtan Martinez (Quad)
- Makes' champion: Toyota Gazoo Racing (FIA); Red Bull KTM Factory Racing (FIM)
- Official website: worldrallyraidchampionship.com

The World Rally-Raid Championship (officially abbreviated as W2RC) is a rally raid series co-sanctioned by the FIA and FIM and promoted by the Amaury Sport Organisation (ASO). The championship's seasons culminate with world championship titles in both automobile and motorcycle categories.

Beginning in 2022, the series replaced both the FIA World Cup for Cross-Country Rallies and FIM Cross-Country Rallies World Championship as the top echelon of the sport of rally raid. ASO will serve as series promoter for a period of five years.

== History ==
The combined World Championship series was conceived as a result of efforts by the ASO, FIA and FIM to harmonize regulations. After a vote by the World Motorsport Council to officially make rally raid the seventh world championship under the FIA in 2021, they joined with the FIM to combine their respective international cross-country rallying series into a single World Rally-Raid Championship. The ASO, promoter of the Dakar Rally, was chosen by both world-governing bodies as the sole promoter of the series for a period of five years.

The inaugural World Championship officially kicked off with the 2022 Dakar Rally and ended in Morocco following revisions to the schedule due to the Russian Invasion of Ukraine, forcing the cancellation of that year's Rally Kazakhstan, and environmental concerns that forced the Andalucia Rally to be rescheduled. The inaugural winners of the FIA World Rally-Raid Championship were Nasser Al-Attiyah and Mathieu Baumel with Toyota Gazoo Racing as the winning manufacturer; while Sam Sunderland did likewise in the FIM World Rally-Raid Championship with Monster Energy Honda.

== Format ==
The championship consists primarily of two forms of cross-country rallying:

- Cross-Country Rally: Between four and six timed stages; total distance of 1200km.
- Cross-Country Marathon: More than six timed stages; total distance of 2500km.

The cross-country baja format continues to be contested in the international FIA World Baja Cup and FIM Bajas World Cup competitions, separate from the world championship.

== Categories and awards ==
The series covers various categories under both the FIA and FIM.

=== FIA categories ===
- T1 "Ultimate": Prototype Cross-Country Cars
  - FIA World Rally-Raid Championship for drivers, navigators, and manufacturers
- T2 "Stock": Series Production Cross-Country Cars
  - FIA World Rally-Raid Championship for drivers and navigators
  - FIA Rally-Raid Championship for Stock drivers, navigators, and manufacturers
  - FIA Rally-Raid Championship for Teams
- T3 "Challenger": Lightweight Prototype Cross-Country Vehicles
  - FIA World Rally-Raid Championship for drivers and navigators
  - FIA Rally-Raid Championship for Challenger drivers and navigators
  - FIA Rally-Raid Championship for Teams
- T4 "SSV": Modified Production Cross-Country Side-by-Side Vehicles
  - FIA World Rally-Raid Championship for drivers and navigators
  - FIA Rally-Raid Championship for SSV drivers, navigators, and manufacturers
  - FIA Rally-Raid Championship for Teams
- T5 "Truck": Prototype and Production Cross-Country Trucks

The FIA Rally-Raid Championship for Master Drivers is awarded to drivers over the age of 50.

Groups T1, T2, T3 and T4 are eligible for the overall FIA Rally-Raid World Championship titles for drivers and navigators, while only manufacturers in T1 are eligible. Additional Group-specific championships are awarded in Groups T2, T3, and T4. While T5 vehicles can participate no championship is awarded.

=== FIM categories ===
- RallyGP
  - FIM RallyGP World Championship for riders and manufacturers
- Rally2
  - FIM Rally2 World Cup for riders and teams
  - FIM Rally2 Junior Trophy
  - FIM Rally2 Women Trophy
  - FIM Rally2 Veteran Trophy
- Rally3
  - FIM Rally3 World Cup for riders and teams
  - FIM Rally3 Junior Trophy
- Quad
  - FIM Quad World Cup

Only riders competing in the RallyGP category are eligible for the FIM Rally-Raid World Championship. World Cup titles are available for champions of the Rally2, Rally3, and Quad categories.

== Champions ==
=== FIA Rally-Raid World Champions ===
Season
Season	Driver	Navigator	Manufacturer
2022	(Qatar) Nasser Al-Attiyah	(France) Mathieu Baumel	(Japan) Toyota Gazoo Racing
2022	(France) Sébastien Loeb	(Belgium) Fabian Lurquin	(Germany) X-Raid Mini JCW Team
2022	(Saudi Arabia) Yazeed Al-Rajhi	(Germany) Dirk von Zitzewitz	(Belgium) OT3 by G Rally Team
2023	(Qatar) Nasser Al-Attiyah	(France) Mathieu Baumel	(Japan) Toyota Gazoo Racing
2023	(Saudi Arabia) Yazeed Al-Rajhi	(Germany) Timo Gottschalk	(Germany) X-Raid Mini JCW Team
2023	(Argentina) Juan Cruz Yacopini	(Spain) Daniel Oliveras Carreras	(Qatar) Bahrain Raid Xtreme
2024	(Qatar) Nasser Al-Attiyah	(France) Édouard Boulanger	(Japan) Toyota Gazoo Racing
2024	(Saudi Arabia) Yazeed Al-Rajhi	(Germany) Timo Gottschalk	(Qatar) Nasser Racing by Prodrive
2024	(Brazil) Lucas Moraes	(Spain) Armand Monleón	(Germany) X-Raid Mini JCW Team
2025	(Brazil) Lucas Moraes	(France) Édouard Boulanger	(Japan) Toyota Gazoo Racing
2025	(Qatar) Nasser Al-Attiyah	(Spain) Armand Monleón	(France) The Dacia Sandriders
2025	(South Africa) Henk Lategan	(South Africa) Brett Cummings	(United Kingdom) Ford M-Sport

=== FIM Rally-Raid World Champions ===
Season
Season	Rider	Manufacturer
2022	(United Kingdom) Sam Sunderland	(Japan) Monster Energy Honda
2022	(United States) Ricky Brabec	(Austria) Red Bull KTM Factory Racing
2022	(France) Adrien Van Beveren	(Spain) Red Bull Gas Gas Factory Racing
2023	(Argentina) Luciano Benavides	(Japan) Monster Energy Honda
2023	(Australia) Toby Price	(Austria) Red Bull KTM Factory Racing
2023	(France) Adrien Van Beveren	(Sweden) Husqvarna Factory Racing
2024	(Botswana) Ross Branch	(Japan) Monster Energy Honda
2024	(France) Adrien Van Beveren	(India) Hero MotoSports Team Rally
2024	(Spain) Tosha Schareina	None
2025	(Australia) Daniel Sanders	(Austria) Red Bull KTM Factory Racing
2025	(Spain) Tosha Schareina	(Japan) Monster Energy Honda
2025	(United States) Ricky Brabec	(India) Hero MotoSports Team Rally

=== FIA Rally-Raid Champions ===
Season
Season	T3 Driver	T3 Navigator	T4 Driver	T4 Navigator	T5 Driver	T5 Navigator
2022	(Chile) Francisco López	(France) François Cazalet	(Lithuania) Rokas Baciuška	(Poland) Lukasz Laskawiec	(Netherlands) Kees Koolen	(Netherlands) Wouter De Graaff
2022	(United States) Seth Quintero	(Germany) Dennis Zenz	(Poland) Marek Goczał	(Brazil) Gustavo Gugelmin	(Czech Republic) Martin Macík	(Czech Republic) František Tomášek
2022	(Spain) Cristina Gutiérrez	(Chile) Juan Pablo Latrach	(United States) Austin Jones	(Spain) Oriol Mena	(Czech Republic) Tomáš Vrátný	(Czech Republic) David Švanda
2023	(United States) Seth Quintero	(Germany) Dennis Zenz	(Lithuania) Rokas Baciuška	(Spain) Oriol Vidal	(Netherlands) Janus van Kasteren	(Netherlands) Marcel Snijders (Poland) Darek Rodewald
2023	(United States) Mitch Guthrie	(United States) Kellon Walch	(Japan) Shinsuke Umeda	(Spain) Oriol Mena	(Czech Republic) Tomáš Vrátný	-
2023	(United States) Austin Jones	(Brazil) Gustavo Gugelmin	(Poland) Eryk Goczał	(Italy) Maurizio Dominella	(Czech Republic) Martin Macík	(Poland) Bartlomiej Boba (Czech Republic) Jaromir Martinec
2024	(Lithuania) Rokas Baciuška	(Argentina) Valentina Pertegarini	(Saudi Arabia) Yasir Seaidan	(Argentina) Fernando Acosta	-	-
2024	(Argentina) Nicolás Cavigliasso	(Spain) Oriol Vidal Montijano	(Ecuador) Sebastian Guayasamin	(Spain) Fausto Mota	-	-
2024	(Brazil) Marcelo Gastaldi	(Brazil) Carlos Sachs	(Italy) Rebecca Busi	(Uruguay) Sergio Lafuente	-	-
2025	(Argentina) Nicolás Cavigliasso	(Argentina) Valentina Pertegarini	(Portugal) Alexandre Pinto	(Portugal) Bernardo Oliveira	-	-
2025	(Spain) Pau Navarro	(France) Stéphane Duple	(Italy) Enrico Gaspari	(Spain) Fausto Mota	-	-
2025	(Saudi Arabia) Dania Akeel	(Spain) Jan Rosa I Viñas	(Italy) Michele Cinotto	(Italy) Maurizio Dominella	-	-

=== FIM Rally-Raid World Cup ===
Season
Season	Rally2 Rider	Rally2 Team	Rally3 Rider	Quad Rider
2022	(United States) Mason Klein	Not Held	(Morocco) Amine Echiguer	(France) Alexandre Giroud
2022	(France) Romain Dumontier		(France) Jeremy Miroir	(Slovakia) Juraj Varga
2022	(South Africa) Bradley Cox		(France) Guillaume Borne	(Poland) Kamil Wiśniewski
2023	(France) Romain Dumontier	Not Held	(Austria) Ardit Kurtaj	(Lithuania) Laisvydas Kancius
2023	(Italy) Paolo Lucci		(United States) Alexander Chepurko	(Guatemala) Rodolfo Guillioli Schippers
2023	(France) Jean-Loup Lepan		(Senegal) Cheikh-Yves Jacquemain	(Slovakia) Juraj Varga
2024	(South Africa) Bradley Cox	Not Held	(Chile) John Medina	(Argentina) Manuel Andújar
2024	(France) Romain Dumontier		(Argentina) Eduardo Alan	(Poland) Kamil Wiśniewski
2024	(Poland) Konrad Dabrowski		(Morocco) Souleymane Addahri	(Lithuania) Antonas Kanopkinas
2025	(Spain) Edgar Canet	(Netherlands) BAS World KTM Racing Team	(France) Thomas Zoldos	(France) Gaëtan Martinez
2025	(Austria) Tobias Ebster	(Spain) Xraids Experience	(Italy) Carlo Cabini	(Lithuania) Antanas Kanopkinas
2025	(South Africa) Michael Docherty	(United Arab Emirates) SRG Motorsports	(France) Noa Sainct	(Poland) Marek Loj

=== FIM Rally-Raid Trophies ===
Season
Season	Women	Junior (R2)	Senior	Junior (R3)
2022	(Netherlands) Mirjam Pol	(United States) Mason Klein	(Portugal) Mario Patrao	No Participants
2022	(Spain) Sandra Gómez	(Poland) Konrad Dąbrowski	(Italy) Franco Picco	
2022	(Spain) Sara García	(South Africa) Bradley Cox	(United Kingdom) David McBride	
2023	(Netherlands) Mirjam Pol	(France) Jean Loup Lepan	(Spain) Dominique Cizeau Girault	No Participants
2023	-	(South Africa) Bradley Cox	-	
2023	-	(Poland) Konrad Dąbrowski	-	
2024	No Participants	(Poland) Konrad Dąbrowski	(Argentina) Sebastian Urquia	No Participants
2024			(France) Sébastien Herbet	
2024			(United Kingdom) David McBride	
2025	(Spain) Sandra Gómez	(Spain) Edgar Canet	(Czech Republic) David Pabiska	(France) Noa Sainct
2025	(India) Aishwarya Pissay	(Poland) Konrad Dąbrowski	(Argentina) Sebastian Urquia	-
2025	-	(Germany) Justin Gerlach	(Australia) David Brock	-

== See also ==
- FIA World Baja Cup
- FIM Bajas World Cup
