= 2023 World Rally-Raid Championship =

Rally raid season

2023 World Rally-Raid Championship
Previous:	2022	Next:	2024

The 2023 World Rally-Raid Championship was the second season of the annual competition for rally raid events sanctioned by both the FIA and FIM. The Amaury Sport Organization is in the second of a five-year contract to promote the championship.

== Calendar ==
The calendar for the 2023 season featured five rally-raid events. The famous Dakar Rally was again the opening event while both the Abu Dhabi Desert Challenge and Rallye du Maroc returned as longstanding events. New for 2023 were the Mexico-based Sonora Rally and Argentina's Desafio Ruta 40; replacing rounds originally held in Kazakhstan and Spain.

Round	Dates	Rally name	Format	Ref.
1	31 December–15 January	(Saudi Arabia) Dakar Rally	Marathon	
2	25 February–2 March	(United Arab Emirates) Abu Dhabi Desert Challenge	Rally	
3	22–28 April	(Mexico) Sonora Rally	Rally	
4	26 August–1 September	(Argentina) Desafío Ruta 40	Rally	
5	12–18 October	(Morocco) Rallye du Maroc	Rally	

== FIA World Rally-Raid Championship ==
- Entrants competing in the T1, T2, T3, and T4 classes are eligible for the overall World Championship.

=== Entry list ===
T1 Teams & Drivers
Constructor	Vehicle	Team	Driver	Co-driver	Rounds
Audi	RS Q E-Tron E2	(Germany) Team Audi Sport	(Sweden) Mattias Ekström	(Sweden) Emil Bergkvist	1, 5
Audi	RS Q E-Tron E2	(Germany) Team Audi Sport	(France) Stéphane Peterhansel	(France) Édouard Boulanger	1, 5
Audi	RS Q E-Tron E2	(Germany) Team Audi Sport	(Spain) Carlos Sainz Sr.	(Spain) Lucas Cruz	1, 5
BAIC	BJ40	(China) BAIC ORV	(China) Zhang Guoyu	(France) Jean-Pierre Garcin	1
BAIC	BJ40	(China) BAIC ORV	(China) Zhang Guoyu	(Spain) Oriol Mena	2–3
BAIC	BJ40	(China) BAIC ORV	(China) Zi Yunliang	(China) Sha He	1–3
Century	CR6-T	(South Africa) Century Racing Factory Team	(France) Mathieu Serradori	(France) Loïc Minaudier	1, 5
Ford	Raptor RS Cross Country	(Czech Republic) Orlen Benzina Team	(Czech Republic) Martin Prokop	(Czech Republic) Viktor Chytka	1–2, 5
Mini	John Cooper Works Plus	(Germany) X-Raid Mini JCW Team	(Argentina) Sebastian Halpern	(Argentina) Bernardo Graue	1–4
Mini	John Cooper Works Plus	(Germany) X-Raid Mini JCW Team	(Poland) Krzysztof Hołowczyc	(Poland) Lukasz Kurzeja	5
Mini	John Cooper Works Buggy	(Germany) X-Raid Mini JCW Team	(Kyrgyzstan) Denis Krotov	Konstantin Zhiltsov	1–3
Prodrive	Hunter	(France) GCK Motorsport	(France) Guerlain Chicherit	(France) Alex Winocq	1–3
Prodrive	Hunter	Bahrain Raid Xtreme	(France) Sébastien Loeb	(Belgium) Fabian Lurquin	1–3
Prodrive	Hunter	Bahrain Raid Xtreme	(Argentina) Orlando Terranova	(Spain) Alex Haro	1
Prodrive	Hunter	Bahrain Raid Xtreme	(Argentina) Orlando Terranova	(Argentina) Bernardo Graue	5
SMG	HW2021	(China) Hanwei Motorsport Team	(China) Tian Po	(China) Du Xuanyi	1–2
SMG	HW2021	(China) Hanwei Motorsport Team	(China) Han Wei	(China) Ma Li	1–2
Toyota	Hilux Overdrive	(Belgium) Overdrive Racing	(Saudi Arabia) Yazeed Al-Rajhi	(Germany) Dirk von Zitzewitz	1
Toyota	Hilux Overdrive	(Belgium) Overdrive Racing	(Saudi Arabia) Yazeed Al-Rajhi	(Germany) Timo Gottschalk	2–5
Toyota	Hilux Overdrive	(Belgium) Overdrive Racing	(Netherlands) Erik van Loon	(France) Sébastien Delaunay	1
Toyota	Hilux Overdrive	(Belgium) Overdrive Racing	(Argentina) Juan Cruz Yacopini	(Spain) Daniel Oliveras	1–3, 5
Toyota	Hilux Overdrive	(Belgium) Overdrive Racing	(Kyrgyzstan) Denis Krotov	Konstantin Zhiltsov	4–5
Toyota	Hilux Overdrive	(Belgium) Overdrive Racing	(Italy) Eugenio Amos	(Italy) Paolo Ceci	4
Toyota	Hilux Overdrive	(Belgium) Overdrive Racing	(France) Guerlain Chicherit	(France) Alex Winocq	5
Toyota	GR DKR Hilux	Toyota Gazoo Racing South Africa	(Qatar) Nasser Al-Attiyah	(France) Mathieu Baumel	All
Toyota	Hilux	(Poland) ProXCars TME Rally Team	(Poland) Magdalena Zajac	(Poland) Jacek Czachor	1–2, 5

=== Results ===
Round	Rally name	FIA World Rally-Raid Championship Podium finishers			
Round	Rally name	Rank	Driver/Co-Driver	Car	Time
1	(Saudi Arabia) Dakar Rally	1	(Qatar) Nasser Al-Attiyah (France) Mathieu Baumel	Toyota GR DKR Hilux	45:03:15
1	(Saudi Arabia) Dakar Rally	2	(France) Sébastien Loeb (Belgium) Fabian Lurquin	Prodrive Hunter	46:24:04
1	(Saudi Arabia) Dakar Rally	3	(Czech Republic) Martin Prokop (Czech Republic) Viktor Chytka	Ford Raptor RS Cross Country	48:43:59
2	(United Arab Emirates) Abu Dhabi Desert Challenge	1	(Saudi Arabia) Yazeed Al-Rajhi (Germany) Timo Gottschalk	Toyota Hilux Overdrive	16:28:06
2	(United Arab Emirates) Abu Dhabi Desert Challenge	2	(Czech Republic) Martin Prokop (Czech Republic) Viktor Chytka	Ford Raptor RS Cross Country	16:40:37
2	(United Arab Emirates) Abu Dhabi Desert Challenge	3	(United States) Seth Quintero (Germany) Dennis Zenz	Cam-Am Maverick X3	16:58:31
3	(Mexico) Sonora Rally	1	(Qatar) Nasser Al-Attiyah (France) Mathieu Baumel	Toyota GR DKR Hilux	10:29:55
3	(Mexico) Sonora Rally	2	(Saudi Arabia) Yazeed Al-Rajhi (Germany) Timo Gottschalk	Toyota Hilux Overdrive	10:36:17
3	(Mexico) Sonora Rally	3	(Argentina) Sebastian Halpern (Argentina) Bernardo Graue	Mini John Cooper Works Plus	10:44:13
4	(Argentina) Desafio Ruta 40	1	(Qatar) Nasser Al-Attiyah (France) Mathieu Baumel	Toyota GR DKR Hilux	15:10:03
4	(Argentina) Desafio Ruta 40	2	(Argentina) Juan Cruz Yacopini (Spain) Daniel Oliveras	Toyota Hilux Overdrive	15:32:06
4	(Argentina) Desafio Ruta 40	3	(Saudi Arabia) Yazeed Al-Rajhi (Germany) Timo Gottschalk	Toyota Hilux Overdrive	15:40:30
5	(Morocco) Rallye du Maroc	1	(Saudi Arabia) Yazeed Al-Rajhi (Germany) Timo Gottschalk	Toyota Hilux Overdrive	
5	(Morocco) Rallye du Maroc	2	(Kyrgyzstan) Denis Krotov; Konstantin Zhiltsov	Toyota Hilux Overdrive	
5	(Morocco) Rallye du Maroc	3	(Argentina) Juan Cruz Yacopini (Spain) Daniel Oliveras	Toyota Hilux Overdrive	

=== FIA Rally-Raid World Championship for Drivers, Co-Drivers, and Manufacturers ===
Points system

Competitors have to be registered to score points.

- Points for final positions in rally events are awarded as per the following table:

Position	1st	2nd	3rd	4th	5th	6th	7th	8th	9th	10th	11th	12th	13th	14th	15th
Overall points	30	25	20	17	15	13	10	9	8	7	6	5	4	3	2
Leg Points	5	4	3	2	1	0									

- Points for final positions in marathon events are awarded as per the following table:

Position	1st	2nd	3rd	4th	5th	6th	7th	8th	9th	10th	11th	12th	13th	14th	15th
Overall points	50	40	30	25	20	15	10	9	8	7	6	5	4	3	2
Leg Points	5	4	3	2	1	0									

==== Drivers' & Co-Drivers' championships ====
Pos	Driver	DAK (Saudi Arabia)	ABU (United Arab Emirates)	SON (Mexico)	DES (Argentina)	MOR (Morocco)	Points
1	(Qatar) Nasser Al-Attiyah	1^{85}	Ret	1^{51}	1^{53}	15^{16}	205
2	(Saudi Arabia) Yazeed Al-Rajhi	30^{19}	1^{44}	2^{43}	3^{32}	1^{43}	181
3	(Argentina) Juan Cruz Yacopini	4^{26}	4^{23}	5^{20}	2^{40}	3^{23}	132
4	(France) Sébastien Loeb	2^{87}	21^{14}	Ret		18^{11}	112
5	(Argentina) Sebastian Halpern	6^{24}	5^{19}	3^{31}	11^{15}		89
6	(Czech Republic) Martin Prokop	3^{31}	2^{33}			4^{17}	81
7	(Sweden) Mattias Ekström	9^{37}	22^{3}	8^{9}	12^{10}	6^{18}	77
8	(Kyrgyzstan) Denis Krotov	16	Ret	4^{22}	8^{15}	2^{27}	64
9	(France) Guerlain Chicherit	7^{49}	Ret	21^{6}			55
10	(United States) Seth Quintero	12^{8}	3^{24}	17	13^{5}	7^{11}	48
11	(United States) Austin Jones	10^{11}	7^{11}	9^{8}	6^{13}		43
12	(United States) Mitchell Guthrie	29	16^{3}	7^{11}	4^{21}	22^{3}	38
13	(Spain) Cristina Gutiérrez	17	Ret	10^{7}	5^{15}	8^{9}	31
14	(China) Han Wei	5^{23}	9^{8}				31
15	(China) Zhang Guoyu	11^{10}	10^{7}	6^{14}			31
16	(Lithuania) Rokas Baciuška	14^{5}	6^{13}	11^{6}			24
17	(France) Mathieu Serradori	8^{22}					22
18	(Portugal) João Ferreira	38	15^{3}	14^{3}	9^{8}	11^{6}	20
19	(Poland) Marek Goczał	15^{4}				5^{15}	19
20	(Chile) Francisco López	18		13^{4}	7^{11}		15
21	(Spain) Carlos Sainz Sr.	Ret				12^{11}	11
22	(France) Claude Fournier	28	14^{3}	18	10^{7}		10
23	(France) Stéphane Peterhansel	Ret				14^{10}	10
24	(Spain) Pau Navarro	22	8^{9}				9
25	(China) Zi Yunliang	24	13^{4}	12^{5}			9
26	(Argentina) David Zille	36		15^{2}	14^{3}	13^{4}	9
27	(Argentina) Orlando Terranova					16^{9}	9
28	(Netherlands) Kees Koolen					9^{8}	8
29	(Poland) Eryk Goczał	13^{8}					8
30	(Saudi Arabia) Dania Akeel					10^{7}	7
31	(Seychelles) Aliyyah Koloc	37	11^{6}				6
32	(France) Jean-Luc Ceccaldi-Pisson	26	12^{5}				5
33	(Japan) Shinsuke Umeda	32	17	20	15^{2}		2
34	(Poland) Michał Goczał					23^{1}	1
Pos	Driver	DAK (Saudi Arabia)	ABU (United Arab Emirates)	SON (Mexico)	DES (Argentina)	MOR (Morocco)	Points

Pos	Driver	DAK (Saudi Arabia)	ABU (United Arab Emirates)	SON (Mexico)	DES (Argentina)	MOR (Morocco)	Points
1	(France) Mathieu Baumel	1^{85}	Ret	1^{51}	1^{53}	15^{16}	205
2	(Germany) Timo Gottschalk		1^{44}	2^{43}	3^{32}	1^{43}	162
3	(Spain) Daniel Oliveras	4^{26}	4^{23}	5^{20}	2^{40}	3^{23}	132
4	(Belgium) Fabian Lurquin	2^{87}	21^{14}	Ret		18^{11}	112
5	(Argentina) Bernardo Graue	6^{24}	5^{19}	3^{31}	11^{15}	16^{9}	98
6	(Czech Republic) Viktor Chytka	3^{31}	2^{33}			4^{17}	81
7	(Sweden) Emil Bergkvist	9^{37}	22^{3}	8^{9}	12^{10}	6^{18}	77
8	Konstantin Zhiltsov	16	Ret	4^{22}	8^{15}	2^{27}	64
9	(France) Alex Winocq	7^{49}	Ret	21^{6}			55
10	(Germany) Dennis Zenz	12^{8}	3^{24}	17	13^{5}	7^{11}	48
11	(Brazil) Gustavo Gugelmin	10^{11}	7^{11}	9^{8}	6^{13}		43
12	(United States) Kellon Walch	29	16^{3}	7^{11}	4^{21}	22^{3}	38
13	(Spain) Pablo Moreno	17	Ret	10^{7}	5^{15}	8^{9}	31
14	(China) Ma Li	5^{23}	9^{8}				31
15	(Spain) Oriol Mena	13^{8}	10^{7}	6^{14}			29
16	(Spain) Oriol Vidal	14^{5}	6^{13}	11^{6}			24
17	(France) Loïc Minaudier	8^{22}					22
18	(Poland) Maciej Marton	15^{4}				5^{15}	19
19	(Germany) Dirk von Zitzewitz	30^{19}					19
20	(Portugal) Filipe Palmeiro	38	15^{3}	14^{3}		11^{6}	12
21	(Argentina) Bruno Jacomy				7^{11}		11
22	(Poland) Szymon Gospodarczyk		14^{3}	18	10^{7}	23^{1}	11
23	(Spain) Lucas Cruz					12^{11}	11
24	(France) Jean-Pierre Garcin	11^{10}					10
25	(France) Édouard Boulanger					14^{10}	10
26	(France) François Cazalet		8^{9}				9
27	(China) Sha He	24	13^{4}	12^{5}			9
28	(Argentina) Sebastian Cesana	36		15^{2}	14^{3}	14^{4}	9
29	(Portugal) Manuel Porem				9^{8}		8
=	(Netherlands) Wouter Rosegaar					9^{8}	8
31	(France) Sébastien Delaunay					10^{7}	7
32	(France) Stéphane Duplé	37	11^{6}				6
33	(France) Cédric Duplé	26	12^{5}				5
34	(Chile) Juan Pablo Latrach	18		13^{4}			4
35	(Italy) Maurizio Dominella	Ret	Ret		15^{2}		2
Pos	Driver	DAK (Saudi Arabia)	ABU (United Arab Emirates)	SON (Mexico)	DES (Argentina)	MOR (Morocco)	Points

==== Manufacturer's championship ====
Points system

A registered manufacturer is allowed to enter a maximum of three crews in each event. Only the top two from each manufacturer will count towards their score. Points are awarded on the same scales as set out for drivers/co-drivers.

Pos	Manufacturer	DAK (Saudi Arabia)	ABU (United Arab Emirates)	SON (Mexico)	DES (Argentina)	MOR (Morocco)	Points
1	Toyota Gazoo Racing	65	55	55	55	(55)	230
2	X-Raid Mini JCW Team	50	20	37	20	(17)	127
3	Bahrain Raid Xtreme	66	13	11		35	125
4	BAIC ORV	40	32	28			100
Pos	Manufacturer	DAK (Saudi Arabia)	ABU (United Arab Emirates)	SON (Mexico)	DES (Argentina)	MOR (Morocco)	Points

== FIM World Rally-Raid Championship ==
- Only RallyGP entrants are eligible to compete for the World Championship.

=== Entry list ===
RallyGP Teams & Riders
Constructor	Bike	Team	Rider	Rounds
Gas Gas	450 Rally Factory	(Austria) Red Bull Gas Gas Factory Racing	(Australia) Daniel Sanders	1, 3–4
Gas Gas	450 Rally Factory	(Austria) Red Bull Gas Gas Factory Racing	(United Kingdom) Sam Sunderland	1, 3–5
Hero	450 Rally	(India) Hero Motorsports Team Rally	(Botswana) Ross Branch	All
Hero	450 Rally	(India) Hero Motorsports Team Rally	(Germany) Sebastian Bühler	All
Hero	450 Rally	(India) Hero Motorsports Team Rally	(Argentina) Franco Caimi	1
Hero	450 Rally	(India) Hero Motorsports Team Rally	(Portugal) Joaquim Rodrigues	1, 5
Honda	CRF450 Rally	(United States) Monster Energy Honda Team	(United States) Ricky Brabec	All
Honda	CRF450 Rally	(United States) Monster Energy Honda Team	(Chile) José Ignacio Cornejo	All
Honda	CRF450 Rally	(United States) Monster Energy Honda Team	(Chile) Pablo Quintanilla	All
Honda	CRF450 Rally	(United States) Monster Energy Honda Team	(France) Adrien Van Beveren	All
Honda	CRF450 Rally	(United States) Monster Energy Honda Team	(United States) Skyler Howes	5
Husqvarna	450 Rally Factory	(Austria) Husqvarna Factory Racing	(Argentina) Luciano Benavides	All
Husqvarna	450 Rally Factory	(Austria) Husqvarna Factory Racing	(United States) Skyler Howes	1–3
KTM	450 Rally Factory	(Austria) Red Bull KTM Factory Racing	(Argentina) Kevin Benavides	1, 3
KTM	450 Rally Factory	(Austria) Red Bull KTM Factory Racing	(Australia) Toby Price	All
KTM	450 Rally Factory	(Austria) Red Bull KTM Factory Racing	(Austria) Matthias Walkner	1, 3–5
KTM	450 Rally Raid	(Netherlands) BAS World KTM Racing Team	(United States) Mason Klein	1–3

=== Results ===
Round	Rally name	FIM World Rally-Raid Championship Podium finishers			
Round	Rally name	Rank	Rider	Bike	Time
1	(Saudi Arabia) Dakar Rally	1	(Argentina) Kevin Benavides	KTM 450 Rally Factory	44:27:20
1	(Saudi Arabia) Dakar Rally	2	(Australia) Toby Price	KTM 450 Rally Factory	44:28:03
1	(Saudi Arabia) Dakar Rally	3	(United States) Skyler Howes	Husqvarna 450 Rally Factory	44:32:24
2	(United Arab Emirates) Abu Dhabi Desert Challenge	1	(France) Adrien Van Beveren	Honda CRF 450 Rally	17:13:39
2	(United Arab Emirates) Abu Dhabi Desert Challenge	2	(Argentina) Luciano Benavides	Husqvarna 450 Rally Factory	17:17:57
2	(United Arab Emirates) Abu Dhabi Desert Challenge	3	(Australia) Toby Price	KTM 450 Rally Factory	17:18:52
3	(Mexico) Sonora Rally	1	(Australia) Daniel Sanders	Gas Gas 450 Rally Factory	11:01:09
3	(Mexico) Sonora Rally	2	(Argentina) Luciano Benavides	Husqvarna 450 Rally Factory	11:18:25
3	(Mexico) Sonora Rally	3	(Australia) Toby Price	KTM 450 Rally Factory	11:20:52
4	(Argentina) Desafio Ruta 40	1	(Argentina) Luciano Benavides	Husqvarna 450 Rally Factory	16:10:22
4	(Argentina) Desafio Ruta 40	2	(United States) Ricky Brabec	Honda CRF 450 Rally	16:20:02
4	(Argentina) Desafio Ruta 40	3	(Botswana) Ross Branch	Hero 450 Rally	16:25:31
5	(Morocco) Rallye du Maroc	1	(Australia) Toby Price	KTM 450 Rally Factory	15:56:43
5	(Morocco) Rallye du Maroc	2	(Argentina) Luciano Benavides	Husqvarna 450 Rally Factory	15:59:43
5	(Morocco) Rallye du Maroc	3	(Chile) Pablo Quintanilla	Honda CRF 450 Rally	15:59:55

=== FIM Rally-Raid World Championship for Riders and Manufacturers ===
Points system

- A rider has to be registered to score points
- Points for final positions in rally events are awarded as per the following table:

Position	1st	2nd	3rd	4th	5th	6th	7th	8th	9th	10th	11th	12th	13th	14th	15th+
Overall points	25	20	16	13	11	10	9	8	7	6	5	4	3	2	1

- A coefficient of 1.5 will be applied to marathon events. The result will be rounded up to the nearest integer.

==== Rider's championship ====
Pos	Rider	DAK (Saudi Arabia)	ABU (United Arab Emirates)	SON (Mexico)	DES (Argentina)	MOR (Morocco)	Points
1	(Argentina) Luciano Benavides	6^{15}	2^{20}	2^{20}	1^{25}	2^{20}	100
2	(Australia) Toby Price	2^{30}	3^{16}	3^{16}	7^{9}	1^{25}	96
3	(France) Adrien Van Beveren	5^{17}	1^{25}	5^{11}	4^{13}	6^{10}	76
4	(Botswana) Ross Branch	11^{8}	5^{11}	6^{10}	3^{16}	4^{13}	58
5	(Chile) Pablo Quintanilla	4^{20}	Ret	8^{8}	5^{11}	-	39
6	(Chile) José Ignacio Cornejo	8^{12}	4^{13}	10^{6}	6^{10}	5^{11}	52
7	(Argentina) Kevin Benavides	1^{38}	-	11^{5}	-	-	43
8	(Australia) Daniel Sanders	7^{14}	-	1^{25}	-	-	39
9	(United States) Ricky Brabec	Ret	7^{9}	7^{9}	2^{20}	-	38
10	(United States) Skyler Howes	3^{24}	6^{10}	Ret	-	-	34
11	(Germany) Sebastian Bühler	10^{9}	Ret	9^{7}	Ret	7^{9}	25
12	(Austria) Matthias Walkner	Ret	-	4^{13}	Ret	-	13
13	(Argentina) Franco Caimi	9^{11}	-	-	-	-	11
14	(United States) Mason Klein	Ret	Ret	12^{4}	-	-	4
	(United Kingdom) Sam Sunderland	Ret	-	Ret	Ret	-	0
	(Portugal) Joaquim Rodrigues	Ret	-	-	-	-	0
Pos	Rider	DAK (Saudi Arabia)	ABU (United Arab Emirates)	SON (Mexico)	DES (Argentina)	MOR (Morocco)	Points

==== Manufacturer's championship ====
Points system

- Points are awarded to the top-two finishing entries for each manufacturer.

Pos	Manufacturer	DAK (Saudi Arabia)	ABU (United Arab Emirates)	SON (Mexico)	DES (Argentina)	MOR (Morocco)	Points
1	Monster Energy Honda Team	37	38	20	33	27	155
2	Red Bull KTM Factory Racing	68	16	29	9	25	147
3	Husqvarna Factory Racing	39	30	20	25	20	134
4	Hero Motorsports Team Rally	20	11	17	16	22	86
5	Red Bull Gas Gas Factory Racing	14	-	25	-	-	39
Pos	Manufacturer	DAK (Saudi Arabia)	ABU (United Arab Emirates)	SON (Mexico)	DES (Argentina)	MOR (Morocco)	Points

== FIA Rally-Raid Championship ==
=== T3 ===
==== Entry list ====
T3 Teams & Drivers
Constructor	Vehicle	Team	Driver	Co-driver	Rounds
BRP	Can-Am Maverick XRS	(Canada) Red Bull Can-Am Factory Team	(Spain) Cristina Gutiérrez	(Spain) Pablo Moreno	All
BRP	Can-Am Maverick XRS	(Canada) Red Bull Can-Am Factory Team	(Chile) Francisco López	(Chile) Juan Pablo Latrach	1, 3–4
BRP	Can-Am Maverick XRS	(Canada) Red Bull Can-Am Factory Team	(Chile) Francisco López	(Spain) Diego Ortega Gil	5
BRP	Can-Am Maverick XRS	(United States) Red Bull Off-Road Junior Team USA by BFG	(United States) Austin Jones	(Brazil) Gustavo Gugelmin	All
BRP	Can-Am Maverick XRS	(United States) Red Bull Off-Road Junior Team USA by BFG	(United States) Seth Quintero	(Germany) Dennis Zenz	All
BRP	Can-Am Maverick XRS	(Germany) South Racing Can-Am	(Saudi Arabia) Dania Akeel	(Uruguay) Sergio Lafuente	1
BRP	Can-Am Maverick XRS	(Germany) South Racing Can-Am	(Saudi Arabia) Dania Akeel	(South Africa) Taye Perry	2
BRP	Can-Am Maverick XRS	(Germany) South Racing Can-Am	(Argentina) David Zille	(Argentina) Sebastian Cesana	1, 3–5
BRP	Can-Am Maverick XRS	(Germany) South Racing Can-Am	(Portugal) Helder Rodrigues	(Portugal) Gonçalo Reis	1
Can-Am	Maverick X3	(Germany) South Racing Can-Am	(Argentina) Fernando Álvarez	(France) Xavier Panseri	1
Can-Am	Maverick X3	(Germany) South Racing Can-Am	(Netherlands) Erik van Loon	(France) Sebastien Delaunay	2
Can-Am	Maverick X3	(Germany) South Racing Can-Am	(Sweden) Mattias Ekström	(Sweden) Emil Bergkvist	2–4
Can-Am	Maverick X3	(United States) Team BBR/Pole Position 77	(France) Claude Fournier	(France) Arnold Brucy	1
Can-Am	Maverick X3	(United States) Team BBR/Pole Position 77	(France) Claude Fournier	(Poland) Szymon Gospodarczyk	2–4
Buggyra Can-Am	DV21	(Czech Republic) Buggyra ZM Academy	(Seychelles) Aliyyah Koloc	(France) Stéphane Duplé	1–2
PH-Sport	Zephyr	(France) JLC Racing	(France) Jean-Luc Ceccaldi-Pisson	(France) Cédric Duplé	1–2
T3M	By MCE-5 Development	(United States) Red Bull Off-Road Junior Team USA by BFG	(United States) Mitch Guthrie	(United States) Kellon Walch	1–3, 5
Yamaha	X-Raid YXZ 1000 R Turbo Prototype	(Germany) X-Raid Yamaha Supported Team	(Portugal) João Ferreira	(Portugal) Filipe Palmeiro	1–3
Yamaha	X-Raid YXZ 1000 R Turbo Prototype	(Germany) X-Raid Yamaha Supported Team	(Portugal) João Ferreira	(Portugal) Manuel Porem	4
Yamaha	X-Raid YXZ 1000 R Turbo Prototype	(Germany) X-Raid Yamaha Supported Team	(Germany) Annett Fischer	(Sweden) Annie Seel	1–2
Yamaha	X-Raid YXZ 1000 R Turbo Prototype	(Germany) X-Raid Yamaha Supported Team	(Germany) Annett Fischer	(Netherlands) Lisette Bakker	3

==== Results ====
Round	Rally name	FIA Rally-Raid Championship T3 Podium finishers			
Round	Rally name	Rank	Driver/Co-Driver	Car	Time
1	(Saudi Arabia) Dakar Rally	1	(United States) Austin Jones (Brazil) Gustavo Gugelmin	BRP Can-Am Maverick XRS	51:55:53
1	(Saudi Arabia) Dakar Rally	2	(United States) Seth Quintero (Germany) Dennis Zenz	BRP Can-Am Maverick XRS	52:47:58
1	(Saudi Arabia) Dakar Rally	3	(Spain) Cristina Gutiérrez (Spain) Pablo Moreno	BRP Can-Am Maverick XRS	54:52:13
2	(United Arab Emirates) Abu Dhabi Desert Challenge	1	(United States) Seth Quintero (Germany) Dennis Zenz	BRP Can-Am Maverick XRS	16:58:31
2	(United Arab Emirates) Abu Dhabi Desert Challenge	2	(United States) Austin Jones (Brazil) Gustavo Gugelmin	BRP Can-Am Maverick XRS	17:26:16
2	(United Arab Emirates) Abu Dhabi Desert Challenge	3	(Seychelles) Aliyyah Koloc (France) Stéphane Duplé	Buggyra Can-Am DV21	19:20:09
3	(Mexico) Sonora Rally	1	(United States) Mitch Guthrie (United States) Kellon Walch	T3M by MCE-5 Development	11:17:24
3	(Mexico) Sonora Rally	2	(Sweden) Mattias Ekström (Sweden) Emil Bergkvist	Can-Am Maverick X3	11:24:02
3	(Mexico) Sonora Rally	3	(United States) Austin Jones (Brazil) Gustavo Gugelmin	BRP Can-Am Maverick XRS	11:28:10
4	(Argentina) Desafio Ruta 40	1	(United States) Mitch Guthrie (United States) Kellon Walch	T3M by MCE-5 Development	16:22:31
4	(Argentina) Desafio Ruta 40	2	(Spain) Cristina Gutiérrez (Spain) Pablo Moreno	BRP Can-Am Maverick XRS	16:38:49
4	(Argentina) Desafio Ruta 40	3	(United States) Austin Jones (Brazil) Gustavo Gugelmin	BRP Can-Am Maverick XRS	16:50:14
5	(Morocco) Rallye du Maroc	1			
5	(Morocco) Rallye du Maroc	2			
5	(Morocco) Rallye du Maroc	3			

==== FIA Rally-Raid Championship for T3 Drivers and Co-Drivers ====
Points system

Competitors have to be registered to score points.

- Points for final positions in rally events are awarded as per the following table:

Position	1st	2nd	3rd	4th	5th	6th	7th	8th	9th	10th	11th	12th	13th	14th	15th
Overall points	30	25	20	17	15	13	10	9	8	7	6	5	4	3	2
Leg Points	5	4	3	2	1	0									

- Points for final positions in marathon events are awarded as per the following table:

Position	1st	2nd	3rd	4th	5th	6th	7th	8th	9th	10th	11th	12th	13th	14th	15th
Overall points	50	40	30	25	20	15	10	9	8	7	6	5	4	3	2
Leg Points	5	4	3	2	1	0									

===== T3 Drivers' & Co-Drivers' championships =====
Pos	Driver	DAK (Saudi Arabia)	ABU (United Arab Emirates)	SON (Mexico)	DES (Argentina)	MOR (Morocco)	Points
1	(United States) Seth Quintero	2^{77}	1^{50}	9^{18}	8^{20}	2^{36}	201
2	(United States) Mitch Guthrie	7^{58}	7^{23}	1^{45}	1^{48}	8^{22}	196
3	(United States) Austin Jones	1^{83}	2^{39}	3^{24}	3^{25}	7^{19}	190
4	(Spain) Cristina Gutiérrez	3^{52}	Ret	4^{26}	2^{32}	3^{28}	138
5	(Chile) Francisco López	4^{55}		5^{23}	4^{26}		104
6	(Portugal) João Ferreira	12^{28}	6^{23}	6^{23}	5^{23}		97
7	(Sweden) Mattias Ekström		10^{16}	2^{38}	7^{23}		77
8	(Argentina) David Zille	10^{24}		7^{17}	9^{13}	6^{15}	69
9	(France) Claude Fournier	6^{20}	5^{15}	10^{7}	6^{13}		55
10	(Poland) Marek Goczał					1^{41}	41
11	(France) Jean-Luc Ceccaldi-Pisson	5^{23}	4^{18}				41
12	(Seychelles) Aliyyah Koloc	11^{12}	3^{22}				34
13	(Saudi Arabia) Dania Akeel	9^{15}	DSQ			5^{16}	15
14	(Portugal) Helder Rodrigues	8^{22}					22
15	(Germany) Annett Fischer	Ret	9^{11}	8^{9}			20
16	(Netherlands) Kees Koolen					4^{18}	18
17	(Poland) Michal Goczał					9^{17}	17
18	(Netherlands) Erik van Loon		8^{13}				13
	(Argentina) Fernando Álvarez	Ret					0
Pos	Driver	DAK (Saudi Arabia)	ABU (United Arab Emirates)	SON (Mexico)	DES (Argentina)	MOR (Morocco)	Points

Pos	Driver	DAK (Saudi Arabia)	ABU (United Arab Emirates)	SON (Mexico)	DES (Argentina)	MOR (Morocco)	Points
1	(Germany) Dennis Zenz	2^{77}	1^{50}	9^{18}	8^{20}	2^{36}	201
2	(United States) Kellon Walch	7^{58}	7^{23}	1^{45}	1^{48}	8^{22}	196
2	(Brazil) Gustavo Gugelmin	1^{83}	2^{39}	3^{24}	3^{25}	7^{19}	190
4	(Spain) Pablo Moreno	3^{52}	Ret	4^{26}	2^{32}	3^{28}	138
5	(Chile) Juan Pablo Latrach	4^{55}		5^{23}			78
6	(Sweden) Emil Bergkvist		10^{16}	2^{38}	7^{23}		77
7	(Portugal) Filipe Palmeiro	12^{28}	6^{23}	6^{23}			74
8	(Argentina) Sebastian Cesana	10^{24}		7^{17}	9^{13}	6^{15}	69
9	(Poland) Szymon Gospodarczyk		5^{15}	10^{7}	6^{13}	9^{17}	52
10	(Poland) Maciej Marton					1^{41}	41
11	(France) Cédric Duplé	5^{23}	4^{18}				41
12	(France) Stéphane Duplé	11^{12}	3^{22}				34
13	(France) Sebastien Delaunay		8^{13}			5^{16}	29
14	(Argentina) Bruno Jacomy				4^{26}		26
15	(Portugal) Manuel Porem				5^{23}		23
16	(Portugal) Gonçalo Reis	8^{22}					22
17	(France) Arnold Brucy	6^{20}					20
18	(Netherlands) Wouter Rosegaar					4^{18}	18
19	(Uruguay) Sergio Lafuente	9^{15}					15
20	(Sweden) Annie Seel	Ret	9^{11}				11
21	(Netherlands) Lisette Bakker			8^{9}			9
	(France) Xavier Panseri	Ret					0
	(South Africa) Taye Perry		DSQ				0
Pos	Driver	DAK (Saudi Arabia)	ABU (United Arab Emirates)	SON (Mexico)	DES (Argentina)	MOR (Morocco)	Points

=== T4 ===
==== Entry list ====
T4 Teams & Drivers
Constructor	Vehicle	Team	Driver	Co-driver	Rounds
BRP	Can-Am Maverick XRS Turbo	(Canada) Red Bull Can-Am Factory Team	(Lithuania) Rokas Baciuška	(Spain) Oriol Vidal	1–3
BRP	Can-Am Maverick XRS Turbo	(Germany) South Racing Can-Am	(Brazil) Bruno Conti de Oliveira	(Portugal) Pedro Bianchi Prata	1
BRP	Can-Am Maverick XRS Turbo	(Germany) South Racing Can-Am	(Ecuador) Sebastian Guayasamin	(Argentina) Ricardo Torlaschi	1
BRP	Can-Am Maverick XRS Turbo	(Germany) South Racing Can-Am	(Brazil) Rodrigo Luppi de Oliveira	(Brazil) Maykel Justo	1
BRP	Can-Am Maverick XRS Turbo	(Germany) South Racing Can-Am	(Saudi Arabia) Yasir Seaidan	Alexey Kuzmich	1
BRP	Can-Am Maverick XRS Turbo	(Germany) South Racing Can-Am	(Australia) Molly Taylor	(United States) Andrew Short	1
BRP	Can-Am Maverick XRS Turbo	(Poland) Energylandia Rally Team	(Poland) Eryk Goczał	(Spain) Oriol Mena	1
BRP	Can-Am Maverick XRS Turbo	(Poland) Energylandia Rally Team	(Poland) Marek Goczał	(Poland) Maciej Marton	1
BRP	Can-Am Maverick XRS Turbo	(Poland) Energylandia Rally Team	(Poland) Michał Goczał	(Poland) Szymon Gospodarczyk	1
BRP	Can-Am Maverick XRS Turbo	(France) Drag'on Rally Team	(Argentina) Nicolás Cavigliasso	(Argentina) Valentina Pertegarini	1
BRP	Can-Am Maverick XRS Turbo	(Italy) HRT Technology	(Italy) Rebecca Busi	(Italy) Giulia Maroni	1
BRP	Can-Am Maverick XRS Turbo	(Spain) FN Speed Team	(Italy) Rebecca Busi	(France) Sebastien Delaunay	3
BRP	Can-Am Maverick XRS Turbo	(Spain) FN Speed Team	(Spain) Pau Navarro	(France) Michael Metge	1
BRP	Can-Am Maverick XRS Turbo	(Spain) FN Speed Team	(Spain) Pau Navarro	(France) François Cazalet	2
Polaris	RZR Pro R	(France) XTreme Plus Polaris Factory Team	(Italy) Michele Cinotto	(Italy) Maurizio Dominella	1–2
Polaris	RZR Pro R	(France) XTreme Plus Polaris Factory Team	(Japan) Shinsuke Umeda	(Argentina) Facundo Jaton	1–3

==== Results ====
Round	Rally name	FIA Rally-Raid Championship T4 Podium finishers			
Round	Rally name	Rank	Driver/Co-Driver	Car	Time
1	(Saudi Arabia) Dakar Rally	1	(Poland) Eryk Goczał (Spain) Oriol Mena	BRP Can-Am Maverick XRS Turbo	53:10:14
1	(Saudi Arabia) Dakar Rally	2	(Lithuania) Rokas Baciuška (Spain) Oriol Vidal	BRP Can-Am Maverick XRS Turbo	53:26:58
1	(Saudi Arabia) Dakar Rally	3	(Poland) Marek Goczał (Poland) Maciej Marton	BRP Can-Am Maverick XRS Turbo	53:28:20
2	(United Arab Emirates) Abu Dhabi Desert Challenge	1	(Lithuania) Rokas Baciuška (Spain) Oriol Vidal	BRP Can-Am Maverick XRS Turbo	17:25:47
2	(United Arab Emirates) Abu Dhabi Desert Challenge	2	(Spain) Pau Navarro (France) François Cazalet	BRP Can-Am Maverick XRS Turbo	17:51:47
2	(United Arab Emirates) Abu Dhabi Desert Challenge	3	(Japan) Shinsuke Umeda (Argentina) Facundo Jaton	Polaris RZR Pro R	37:46:35
3	(Mexico) Sonora Rally	1	(Lithuania) Rokas Baciuška (Spain) Oriol Vidal	BRP Can-Am Maverick XRS Turbo	11:51:05
3	(Mexico) Sonora Rally	2	(Italy) Rebecca Busi (France) Sebastien Delaunay	BRP Can-Am Maverick XRS Turbo	13:50:16
3	(Mexico) Sonora Rally	3	(Japan) Shinsuke Umeda (Argentina) Facundo Jaton	Polaris RZR Pro R	15:38:43
4	(Argentina) Desafio Ruta 40	1	(Japan) Shinsuke Umeda (Italy) Maurizio Dominella	Polaris RZR Pro R	41:48:02
5	(Morocco) Rallye du Maroc	1			
5	(Morocco) Rallye du Maroc	2			
5	(Morocco) Rallye du Maroc	3			

==== FIA Rally-Raid Championship for T4 Drivers and Co-Drivers ====
Points system

Competitors have to be registered to score points.

- Points for final positions in rally events are awarded as per the following table:

Position	1st	2nd	3rd	4th	5th	6th	7th	8th	9th	10th	11th	12th	13th	14th	15th
Overall points	30	25	20	17	15	13	10	9	8	7	6	5	4	3	2
Leg Points	5	4	3	2	1	0									

- Points for final positions in marathon events are awarded as per the following table:

Position	1st	2nd	3rd	4th	5th	6th	7th	8th	9th	10th	11th	12th	13th	14th	15th
Overall points	50	40	30	25	20	15	10	9	8	7	6	5	4	3	2
Leg Points	5	4	3	2	1	0									

===== T4 Drivers' & Co-Drivers' championships =====
Pos	Driver	DAK (Saudi Arabia)	ABU (United Arab Emirates)	SON (Mexico)	DES (Argentina)	MOR (Morocco)	Points
1	(Lithuania) Rokas Baciuška	2^{79}	1^{55}	1^{55}			189
2	(Japan) Shinsuke Umeda	11^{9}	3^{35}	3^{35}	1^{50}	3^{31}	160
3	(Poland) Eryk Goczał	1^{86}					86
4	(Spain) Pau Navarro	7^{28}	2^{45}				73
5	(Ecuador) Sebastian Guayasamin	6^{27}				2^{44}	71
6	(Poland) Marek Goczał	3^{67}					67
7	(Portugal) João Ferreira					1^{54}	54
8	(Poland) Michał Goczał	5^{50}					50
7	(Italy) Rebecca Busi	Ret		2^{45}			45
8	(Saudi Arabia) Yasir Seaidan	9^{35}					35
9	(Brazil) Bruno Conti de Oliveira	4^{30}					30
11	(Brazil) Rodrigo Luppi de Oliveira	12^{27}					27
12	(Australia) Molly Taylor	8^{20}					20
13	(Argentina) Nicolás Cavigliasso	10^{13}					13
	(Italy) Michele Cinotto	Ret	Ret				0
Pos	Driver	DAK (Saudi Arabia)	ABU (United Arab Emirates)	SON (Mexico)	DES (Argentina)	MOR (Morocco)	Points

Pos	Driver	DAK (Saudi Arabia)	ABU (United Arab Emirates)	SON (Mexico)	DES (Argentina)	MOR (Morocco)	Points
1	(Spain) Oriol Vidal	2^{79}	1^{55}	1^{55}			189
2	(Spain) Oriol Mena	1^{86}					86
3	(Italy) Maurizio Dominella	Ret	Ret		1^{55}	3^{31}	81
4	(Argentina) Facundo Jaton	11^{9}	3^{35}	3^{35}			79
5	(Poland) Maciej Marton	3^{67}					67
6	(Portugal) Filipe Palmeiro					1^{54}	54
7	(Poland) Szymon Gospodarczyk	5^{50}					50
8	(France) François Cazalet		2^{45}				45
9	(France) Sebastien Delaunay			2^{45}			45
10	(Argentina) Fernando Acosta					2^{44}	44
11	Alexey Kuzmich	9^{35}					35
12	(Portugal) Pedro Bianchi Prata	4^{30}					30
13	(France) Michael Metge	7^{28}					28
14	(Argentina) Ricardo Torlaschi	6^{27}					27
15	(Brazil) Maykel Justo	12^{27}					27
16	(United States) Andrew Short	8^{20}					20
17	(Argentina) Valentina Pertegarini	10^{13}					13
	(Italy) Giulia Maroni	Ret					0
Pos	Driver	DAK (Saudi Arabia)	ABU (United Arab Emirates)	SON (Mexico)	DES (Argentina)	MOR (Morocco)	Points

=== T5 ===
- Entries competing in the T5 category will only compete in the legs at Dakar, Abu Dhabi, and Morocco.

==== Entry list ====
T5 Teams & Drivers
Constructor	Vehicle	Team	Driver	Co-drivers	Rounds
Ford	Cargo 4X4	(Czech Republic) Fesh Fesh Team	(Andorra) Albert Llovera	(Andorra) Margot Llobera (Czech Republic) Petr Vojkovsky	1
Tatra	Jamal	(Czech Republic) Fesh Fesh Team	(Czech Republic) Tomas Vratny	(Poland) Bartlomiej Boba (Czech Republic) Jaromir Martinec	1
Iveco	PowerStar	(Netherlands) Project 2030	(Netherlands) Kees Koolen	(Netherlands) Wouter de Graaff (Netherlands) Wouter Rosegaar	1
Iveco	PowerStar	(Czech Republic) MM Technology	(Czech Republic) Martin Macik	(Czech Republic) František Tomášek (Czech Republic) David Svanda	1
Iveco	PowerStar	(Netherlands) Boss Machinery Team De Rooy Iveco	(Netherlands) Janus van Kasteren	(Poland) Darek Rodewald (Netherlands) Marcel Snijders	1

==== Results ====
Round	Rally name	FIA Rally-Raid Championship T5 Podium finishers			
Round	Rally name	Rank	Driver/Co-Driver	Car	Time
1	(Saudi Arabia) Dakar Rally	1	(Netherlands) Janus van Kasteren (Poland) Darek Rodewald (Netherlands) Marcel Snijders	Iveco PowerStar	54:03:33
1	(Saudi Arabia) Dakar Rally	2	(Czech Republic) Martin Macik (Czech Republic) František Tomášek (Czech Republic) David Svanda	Iveco PowerStar	55:18:07
1	(Saudi Arabia) Dakar Rally	3	(Czech Republic) Tomas Vratny (Poland) Bartlomiej Boba (Czech Republic) Jaromir Martinec	Tatra Jamal	68:27:25
2	(United Arab Emirates) Abu Dhabi Desert Challenge	1			
2	(United Arab Emirates) Abu Dhabi Desert Challenge	2			
2	(United Arab Emirates) Abu Dhabi Desert Challenge	3			
5	(Morocco) Rallye du Maroc	1			
5	(Morocco) Rallye du Maroc	2			
5	(Morocco) Rallye du Maroc	3			

==== FIA Rally-Raid Championship for T5 Drivers and Co-Drivers ====
Points system

Competitors have to be registered to score points.

- Points for final positions in rally events are awarded as per the following table:

Position	1st	2nd	3rd	4th	5th	6th	7th	8th	9th	10th	11th	12th	13th	14th	15th
Overall points	30	25	20	17	15	13	10	9	8	7	6	5	4	3	2
Leg Points	5	4	3	2	1	0									

- Points for final positions in marathon events are awarded as per the following table:

Position	1st	2nd	3rd	4th	5th	6th	7th	8th	9th	10th	11th	12th	13th	14th	15th
Overall points	50	40	30	25	20	15	10	9	8	7	6	5	4	3	2
Leg Points	5	4	3	2	1	0									

===== T5 Drivers' & Co-Drivers' championships =====
Pos	Driver	DAK (Saudi Arabia)	ABU (United Arab Emirates)	MOR (Morocco)	Points
1	(Netherlands) Janus van Kasteren	1^{113}			113
2	(Czech Republic) Martin Macik	2^{102}			102
3	(Czech Republic) Tomas Vratny	3^{66}			66
	(Netherlands) Kees Koolen	Ret			0
	(Andorra) Albert Llovera	Ret			0
Pos	Driver	DAK (Saudi Arabia)	ABU (United Arab Emirates)	MOR (Morocco)	Points

Pos	Driver	DAK (Saudi Arabia)	ABU (United Arab Emirates)	MOR (Morocco)	Points
1	(Poland) Darek Rodewald (Netherlands) Marcel Snijders	1^{113}			113
2	(Czech Republic) František Tomášek (Czech Republic) David Svanda	2^{102}			102
3	(Poland) Bartlomiej Boba (Czech Republic) Jaromir Martinec	3^{66}			66
	(Netherlands) Wouter de Graaff (Netherlands) Wouter Rosegaar	Ret			0
	(Andorra) Margot Llobera (Czech Republic) Petr Vojkovsky	Ret			0
Pos	Driver	DAK (Saudi Arabia)	ABU (United Arab Emirates)	MOR (Morocco)	Points

== FIM Rally-Raid World Cup ==
=== Rally2 ===
==== Entry list ====
Rally2 Teams & Riders
Constructor	Team	Rider	Rounds
Husqvarna	Team Dumontier Racing	(France) Romain Dumontier	1, 3–4
Husqvarna	HT Rally Raid Husqvarna Racing	(South Africa) Michael Docherty	1
Husqvarna	HT Rally Raid Husqvarna Racing	(Netherlands) Mirjam Pol	1
Husqvarna	HT Rally Raid Husqvarna Racing	(Slovenia) Toni Mulec	1
Husqvarna	Duust Rally Team	(United States) Jacob Argubright	1, 3
Husqvarna	Team Casteu	(France) Camille Chapelière	1
Husqvarna	Saudi Dirtbike Center	(Saudi Arabia) Mishal Alghuneim	1
Husqvarna		(Romania) Ionut Florea	2
Kove	Kove Racing	(France) Neels Theric	3
Kove	Kove Racing	(China) Sunier Sunier	3
KTM	BAS World KTM Racing Team	(South Africa) Bradley Cox	1, 3–4
KTM	BAS World KTM Racing Team	(Italy) Paolo Lucci	1–4
KTM	BAS World KTM Racing Team	(Slovenia) Toni Mulec	2
KTM	BAS World KTM Racing Team	(South Africa) Michael Docherty	4
KTM	BAS World KTM Racing Team	(Czech Republic) Jiri Broz	4
KTM	Strojrent Racing	(Czech Republic) Jan Brabec	1
KTM	Nomade Racing	(France) Mathieu Dovèze	1
KTM	Nomade Racing	(France) Jean-Loup Lepan	1
KTM	Duust Diverse Racing	(France) Jean-Loup Lepan	2, 4
KTM	Duust Diverse Racing	(Poland) Konrad Dąbrowski	2–4
KTM	American Rally Originals	(United States) David Pearson	
KTM	XRaids Experience	(Spain) Sandra Gómez	1
KTM	XRaids Experience	(Spain) Dominique Cizeau Girault	2, 4
KTM	M3 Rally Team	(Chile) John William Medina	1
KTM		(Romania) Andrei Danila	2

==== Results ====
Round	Rally name	FIM Rally-Raid World Cup Rally2 Podium finishers			
Round	Rally name	Rank	Rider	Bike	Time
1	(Saudi Arabia) Dakar Rally	1	(France) Romain Dumontier	Husqvarna 450 Rally	46:31:44
1	(Saudi Arabia) Dakar Rally	2	(Italy) Paolo Lucci	KTM 450 Rally Factory Replica	47:03:58
1	(Saudi Arabia) Dakar Rally	3	(South Africa) Michael Docherty	Husqvarna FR 450 Rally	47:48:27
2	(United Arab Emirates) Abu Dhabi Desert Challenge	1	(France) Jean-Loup Lepan	KTM 450 Rally	18:44:27
2	(United Arab Emirates) Abu Dhabi Desert Challenge	2	(Italy) Paolo Lucci	KTM 450 Rally Factory Replica	18:52:52
2	(United Arab Emirates) Abu Dhabi Desert Challenge	3	(Slovenia) Toni Mulec	KTM 450 Rally Factory Replica	19:27:29
3	(Mexico) Sonora Rally	1	(France) Romain Dumontier	Husqvarna 450 Rally	11:48:21
3	(Mexico) Sonora Rally	2	(United States) Jacob Argubright	KTM 450 Rally Factory Replica	12:06:08
3	(Mexico) Sonora Rally	3	(Italy) Paolo Lucci	KTM 450 Rally Factory Replica	12:24:29
4	(Argentina) Desafio Ruta 40	1	(South Africa) Bradley Cox	KTM 450 Rally Factory Replica	17:01:01
4	(Argentina) Desafio Ruta 40	2	(Poland) Konrad Dąbrowski	KTM 450 Rally Factory Replica	17:39:54
4	(Argentina) Desafio Ruta 40	3	(France) Romain Dumontier	Husqvarna 450 Rally	17:51:29
5	(Morocco) Rallye du Maroc	1			
5	(Morocco) Rallye du Maroc	2			
5	(Morocco) Rallye du Maroc	3			

==== FIM Rally-Raid World Cup for Rally2 Riders ====
Points system

- A rider has to be registered to score points
- Points for final positions in rally events are awarded as per the following table:

Position	1st	2nd	3rd	4th	5th	6th	7th	8th	9th	10th	11th	12th	13th	14th	15th+
Overall points	25	20	16	13	11	10	9	8	7	6	5	4	3	2	1

- A coefficient of 1.5 will be applied to marathon events. The result will be rounded up to the nearest integer.

===== Rider's championship =====
Pos	Rider	DAK (Saudi Arabia)	ABU (United Arab Emirates)	SON (Mexico)	DES (Argentina)	MOR (Morocco)	Points
1	(France) Romain Dumontier	1^{38}		1^{25}	3^{16}		79
2	(Italy) Paolo Lucci	2^{30}	2^{20}	3^{16}	Ret		66
3	(France) Jean-Loup Lepan	4^{20}	1^{25}		4^{13}		58
4	(South Africa) Bradley Cox	Ret		6^{10}	1^{25}		35
5	(United States) Jacob Argubright	6^{15}		2^{20}			35
6	(South Africa) Michael Docherty	3^{24}			7^{9}		33
7	(Poland) Konrad Dąbrowski		Ret	5^{11}	2^{20}		31
8	(Slovenia) Toni Mulec	7^{14}	3^{16}				30
9	(Spain) Dominique Cizeau Girault		4^{13}		6^{10}		23
10	(France) Mathieu Dovèze	5^{17}					17
11	(France) Neels Theric			4^{13}			13
12	(Czech Republic) Jan Brabec	8^{12}					12
13	(Romania) Ionut Florea		5^{11}				11
14	(Czech Republic) Jiri Broz				5^{11}		11
15	(Netherlands) Mirjam Pol	9^{11}					11
16	(China) Sunier Sunier			7^{9}			9
	(Saudi Arabia) Mishal Alghuneim	Ret					0
	(France) Camille Chapelière	Ret					0
	(Spain) Sandra Gómez	Ret					0
	(Chile) John William Medina	Ret					0
	(Romania) Andrei Danila		Ret				0
Pos	Rider	DAK (Saudi Arabia)	ABU (United Arab Emirates)	SON (Mexico)	DES (Argentina)	MOR (Morocco)	Points

=== Rally3 ===
==== Entry list ====
Rally3 Teams & Riders
Constructor	Bike	Team	Rider	Rounds
Husqvarna	FE 450	Robert Mann FRR	(Italy) Massimo Camurri	3
KTM	450 EXC-F	High Desert Adventures/Duust Co	(Austria) Ardit Kurtaj	3
KTM	450 EXC-F	Xraids Experience	(Austria) Ardit Kurtaj	4
KTM	450 EXC-F	Xraids Experience	(Ecuador) Mauricio Cueva	4
KTM	450 EXC-F	Duust Diverse Racing	(United States) Alexander Chepurko	3
KTM	450 EXC-F		(Argentina) Leo Dari	4

==== Results ====
Round	Rally name	FIM Rally-Raid World Cup Rally3 Podium finishers			
Round	Rally name	Rank	Rider	Bike	Time
3	(Mexico) Sonora Rally	1	(Italy) Massimo Camurri	Husqvarna FE 450	15:59:16
3	(Mexico) Sonora Rally	2	(Austria) Ardit Kurtaj	KTM 450 EXC-F	17:25:59
3	(Mexico) Sonora Rally	3	(United States) Alexander Chepurko	KTM 450 EXC-F	20:30:29
4	(Argentina) Desafio Ruta 40	1	(Austria) Ardit Kurtaj	KTM 450 EXC-F	23:15:45
4	(Argentina) Desafio Ruta 40	2	(Ecuador) Mauricio Cueva	KTM 450 EXC-F	23:26:52
4	(Argentina) Desafio Ruta 40	3	(Argentina) Leo Dari	KTM 450 EXC-F	88:06:01
5	(Morocco) Rallye du Maroc	1			
5	(Morocco) Rallye du Maroc	2			
5	(Morocco) Rallye du Maroc	3			

==== FIM Rally-Raid World Cup for Rally3 Riders ====
Points system

- A rider has to be registered to score points
- Points for final positions in rally events are awarded as per the following table:

Position	1st	2nd	3rd	4th	5th	6th	7th	8th	9th	10th	11th	12th	13th	14th	15th+
Overall points	25	20	16	13	11	10	9	8	7	6	5	4	3	2	1

- A coefficient of 1.5 will be applied to marathon events. The result will be rounded up to the nearest integer.

===== Rider's championship =====
Pos	Rider	DAK (Saudi Arabia)	ABU (United Arab Emirates)	SON (Mexico)	DES (Argentina)	MOR (Morocco)	Points
1	(Austria) Ardit Kurtaj			2^{20}	1^{25}		45
2	(Italy) Massimo Camurri			1^{25}			25
3	(Ecuador) Mauricio Cueva				2^{20}		20
4	(United States) Alexander Chepurko			3^{16}			16
5	(Argentina) Leo Dari				3^{16}		16
Pos	Rider	DAK (Saudi Arabia)	ABU (United Arab Emirates)	SON (Mexico)	DES (Argentina)	MOR (Morocco)	Points

=== Quad ===
==== Entry list ====
Quad Teams & Riders
Constructor	Bike	Team	Rider	Rounds
CFMoto	CForce 1000	CFMoto Thunder Racing Team	(Lithuania) Adomas Gančierius	2
CFMoto	CForce 1000	CFMoto Thunder Racing Team	(Lithuania) Antonas Kanopkinas	2
Yamaha	Raptor 700	Varga Motorsport Team	(Slovakia) Juraj Varga	1, 4
Yamaha	Raptor 700	Story Racing S.R.O.	(Lithuania) Laisvydas Kancius	1
Yamaha	Raptor 700	AG Dakar School	(Lithuania) Laisvydas Kancius	2–3
Yamaha	Raptor 700	Del Amo Motorsports by Motul	(United States) Pablo Copetti	1
Yamaha	Raptor 700	Drag'on Rally Team	(France) Axel Dutrie	1
Yamaha	Raptor 700	Verza Rally Team	(Argentina) Carlos Alejandro Verza	1
Yamaha	Raptor 700	Abu Dhabi Team	(United Arab Emirates) Abdulaziz Ahli	1–2
Yamaha	Raptor 700	7240 Team	(Argentina) Manuel Andújar	1, 4
Yamaha	Raptor 700		(Guatemala) Rodolfo Guillioli	2–4

==== Results ====
Round	Rally name	FIM Rally-Raid World Cup Quad Podium finishers			
Round	Rally name	Rank	Rider	Bike	Time
1	(Saudi Arabia) Dakar Rally	1	(United States) Pablo Copetti	Yamaha Raptor 700	58:37:25
1	(Saudi Arabia) Dakar Rally	2	(Slovakia) Juraj Varga	Yamaha Raptor 700	59:35:52
1	(Saudi Arabia) Dakar Rally	3	(Lithuania) Laisvydas Kancius	Yamaha Raptor 700	76:00:23
2	(United Arab Emirates) Abu Dhabi Desert Challenge	1	(United Arab Emirates) Abdulaziz Ahli	Yamaha Raptor 700	22:01:51
2	(United Arab Emirates) Abu Dhabi Desert Challenge	2	(Lithuania) Laisvydas Kancius	Yamaha Raptor 700	23:07:33
2	(United Arab Emirates) Abu Dhabi Desert Challenge	3	(Lithuania) Adomas Gančierius	CFMoto CForce 1000	27:02:17
3	(Mexico) Sonora Rally	1	(Lithuania) Laisvydas Kancius	Yamaha Raptor 700	15:33:14
3	(Mexico) Sonora Rally	2	(Guatemala) Rodolfo Guillioli	Yamaha Raptor 700	16:19:45
4	(Argentina) Desafío Ruta 40	1	(Argentina) Manuel Andújar	Yamaha Raptor 700	19:24:30
4	(Argentina) Desafío Ruta 40	2	(Guatemala) Rodolfo Guillioli	Yamaha Raptor 700	22:38:12
4	(Argentina) Desafío Ruta 40	3	(Slovakia) Juraj Varga	Yamaha Raptor 700	39:55:39
5	(Morocco) Rallye du Maroc	1			
5	(Morocco) Rallye du Maroc	2			
5	(Morocco) Rallye du Maroc	3			

==== FIM Rally-Raid World Cup for Quad Riders ====
Points system

- A rider has to be registered to score points
- Points for final positions in rally events are awarded as per the following table:

Position	1st	2nd	3rd	4th	5th	6th	7th	8th	9th	10th	11th	12th	13th	14th	15th+
Overall points	25	20	16	13	11	10	9	8	7	6	5	4	3	2	1

- A coefficient of 1.5 will be applied to marathon events. The result will be rounded up to the nearest integer.

===== Rider's championship =====
Pos	Rider	DAK (Saudi Arabia)	ABU (United Arab Emirates)	SON (Mexico)	DES (Argentina)	MOR (Morocco)	Points
1	(Lithuania) Laisvydas Kancius	3^{24}	2^{20}	1^{25}			69
2	(Guatemala) Rodolfo Guillioli		4^{13}	2^{20}	2^{20}		53
3	(Slovakia) Juraj Varga	2^{30}			3^{16}		46
4	(United States) Pablo Copetti	1^{38}					38
5	(United Arab Emirates) Abdulaziz Ahli	Ret	1^{25}				25
6	(Argentina) Manuel Andújar	Ret			1^{25}		25
7	(Argentina) Carlos Alejandro Verza	4^{20}					20
8	(Lithuania) Adomas Gančierius		3^{16}				16
9	(Lithuania) Antonas Kanopkinas		5^{11}				11
	(France) Axel Dutrie	Ret					0
Pos	Rider	DAK (Saudi Arabia)	ABU (United Arab Emirates)	SON (Mexico)	DES (Argentina)	MOR (Morocco)	Points

== FIM Rally-Raid Trophies ==
=== FIM Junior trophy ===
Pos	Rider	DAK (Saudi Arabia)	ABU (United Arab Emirates)	SON (Mexico)	DES (Argentina)	MOR (Morocco)	Points
1	(France) Jean-Loup Lepan	1^{38}	1^{25}		3^{16}		79
2	(South Africa) Bradley Cox	Ret		2^{20}	1^{25}		45
3	(Poland) Konrad Dąbrowski		Ret	1^{25}	2^{20}		45
Pos	Rider	DAK (Saudi Arabia)	ABU (United Arab Emirates)	SON (Mexico)	DES (Argentina)	MOR (Morocco)	Points

=== FIM Women's trophy ===
Pos	Rider	DAK (Saudi Arabia)	ABU (United Arab Emirates)	SON (Mexico)	DES (Argentina)	MOR (Morocco)	Points
1	(Netherlands) Mirjam Pol	1^{38}					38
	(Spain) Sandra Gómez	Ret					0
Pos	Rider	DAK (Saudi Arabia)	ABU (United Arab Emirates)	SON (Mexico)	DES (Argentina)	MOR (Morocco)	Points

=== FIM Veteran's trophy ===
Pos	Rider	DAK (Saudi Arabia)	ABU (United Arab Emirates)	SON (Mexico)	DES (Argentina)	MOR (Morocco)	Points
1	(Spain) Dominique Cizeau Girault		1^{25}		1^{25}		50
Pos	Rider	DAK (Saudi Arabia)	ABU (United Arab Emirates)	SON (Mexico)	DES (Argentina)	MOR (Morocco)	Points
