= Desafío Ruta 40 =

Off-road vehicle race

- Region: Argentina
- Inaugural season: 2010
- Official website: desafioruta40.ar/home/

The Desafío Ruta 40 (English: Route 40 Challenge) is an annual rally raid held in Argentina held intermittently since 2010, and organized by the Argentine Automobile Club (ACA), with the sponsorship of the FIA and the Dakar Rally. The competition constituted the main date of the Argentine Cross Country Rally Championship (CARCC) and was part of the Dakar Series. The race resumed its activity in 2023, being part of the second season of the World Rally-Raid Championship and forming the fourth round within it.

As its name indicated, the test was made up of a variable number of stages along National Route 40, the longest in that country, with more than 5,000 kilometers in length. The competition was held in different categories for cars, motorcycles, ATVs and trucks.

== History ==
In 2010, on the occasion of the Argentina Bicentennial, the Desafío Ruta 40 was organized for the first time, with a complete route of National Route 40, from Cabo Virgenes (Santa Cruz) to La Quiaca (Jujuy), for a total of 5,194 kilometers in nine stages. The success of the competition led to its reiteration in 2011, also with a complete route of the route. The 2012 edition shortened the total route to five stages, starting in San Juan and ending in San Salvador de Jujuy. In 2013, the competition became one of the Dakar Series, consolidating its appeal with more than 125 participants. The route once again joined San Salvador de Jujuy and San Juan, but in a north–south direction. The 2014 edition returned to the south–north format, but starting in Bariloche and ending in San Juan. However, the first two stages were suspended at the last minute due to heavy rain. Catamarca and La Rioja hosted the 2015 edition of the test, while Mendoza, San Juan and La Rioja did so in 2016. In 2017, two independent races were held: the Desafío Route 40 Sur, connecting Neuquén with the Las Grutas de Río Negro resort, and the Desafío Ruta 40 Norte, with a route between San Juan and Tucumán. The race continued in northwest Argentina in 2018, this time from Tucumán to San Juan.

=== Return ===
The competition was not held for the following four years, until it was revived as a round of the World Rally-Raid Championship in 2023. The Desafío Ruta 40 was retained for the 2024 season.

== Winners by edition ==
Year	Moto	Auto	Quad 4x2	Quad 4x4	UTV / SxS	Moto FIM	Quad FIM
2010	(Uruguay) Laurent Lazard	(Argentina) Hernán Kim; Luciano Gennoni	(Argentina) Juan de la Colina	(Argentina) Adrián Isola	(Argentina) Ernesto Marengo		
2011	(Argentina) Javier Pizzolito	(Argentina) Atilio Carignano; Alicia Rava	(Argentina) Lucas Bonetto	(Argentina) Daniel Mazzucco	(Argentina) Omar Yoma		
2012	(Argentina) Pablo Rodríguez	(Argentina) Orlando Terranova (Portugal) Paulo Fuiza	(Argentina) Lucas Bonetto	(Argentina) Daniel Mazzucco	(Argentina) Luciano Gennoni		
2013	(United States) Kurt Caselli	(Spain) Nani Roma (France) Michel Périn	(Argentina) Lucas Bonetto	(Argentina) Daniel Mazzucco		(Chile) Francisco López	(Poland) Rafał Sonik
2014	(Argentina) Javier Pizzolito	(Argentina) Juan Manuel Silva (Spain) Rubén García	(Uruguay) Sergio Lafuente	(Argentina) Daniel Mazzucco			
2015	(Portugal) Paulo Gonçalves	(Argentina) Orlando Terranova (Argentina) Bernardo Graue	(Argentina) Lucas Bonetto	(Argentina) Daniel Mazzucco			
2016	(Argentina) Kevin Benavides	(Argentina) Sebastián Halpern (Uruguay) Sergio Lafuente	(Argentina) Jeremías González	(Argentina) Pablo Novara	(Argentina) Hernán Bradas (Argentina) Juan José Spinella		
2017 Sur	(Argentina) Felipe Ellis	(Argentina) Emiliano Spataro (Argentina) Santiago Hansen	(Uruguay) Sergio Lafuente	(Argentina) Daniel Mazzucco	(Argentina) Hernán Bradas (Argentina) Juan José Spinella		
2017 Norte	(Argentina) Kevin Benavides	(Argentina) Orlando Terranova (Argentina) Bernardo Graue	(Argentina) Jeremías González	(Argentina) Daniel Mazzucco			
2018	(Portugal) Paulo Gonçalves	(Argentina) Sebastián Halpern (Argentina) Eduardo Pulenta	(Argentina) Nicolás Cavigliasso	(Argentina) Julio Estanguet	(Argentina) Juan Manuel Silva		
2023	(Spain) Tosha Schareina	(Qatar) Nasser Al-Attiyah (France) Mathieu Baumel	–	(Argentina) Manuel Andújar	(United States) Mitchell Guthrie (United States) Kellon Walch	(Argentina) Luciano Benavides	
2024	(United States) Ricky Brabec	(Saudi Arabia) Yazeed Al-Rajhi (Germany) Timo Gottschalk	–	(Argentina) Manuel Andújar	(Lithuania) Rokas Baciuška (France) Sébastien Delaunay		
2026	(Australia) Daniel Sanders	(United States) Seth Quintero (United States) Andrew Short	–	(Argentina) Lucas Domínguez	(Austria) Matthias Walkner (Spain) Pablo Moreno		
