= Austin Jones (racing driver) =

American off-road racing driver

- Nationality: US
- Born: January 19, 1996 (age 30)

Championship titles
- 2021 2022: FIA World Cup for Cross-Country Rallies (T4); Dakar Rally (SSV)

Austin Jones (born January 19, 1996) is an American off-road racing driver. He won the Dakar Rally in 2022 in the SSV T4 category. He also won the 2021 FIA World Cup for Cross-Country Rallies in the SSV T4 category and is a 2x Baja 1000 winner and SCORE International Champion in the Trophy Truck Spec Class.

== Trophy truck ==
Jones started his career in racing early, first taking the co-driver seat as his father Jesse's navigator in 2018 at the age of 22. It wasn't long until a young Jones moved into the driver's seat, making a name for himself almost immediately in the desert racing scene. Behind the wheel of a TSCO built and prepped Thunderstruck 6100 truck, Jones began taking on – and winning – some of North America's most infamous desert races, including the San Felipe 250, Baja 500 and Baja 1000 and eventually securing a SCORE championship as well as SCORE's 2019 Rookie of the Year.

== Rally-raid ==
In 2019, Jones shifted his focus to the challenge of European-style off-road rallies. Moving from trophy trucks into side-by-side (vehicles) (SSV), Jones eventually teamed up with Brazilian co-driver Gustavo Gugelmin, a seasoned navigator with a track record in SSV racing.

In 2021, the duo found themselves traveling the world to compete in the FIA World Cup of Cross-Country Rally season. After placing first in three of the four points-sanctioned rallies, Jones became the first American to be named the FIA World Cup of Cross-Country Rallies Champion.

He would continue with that momentum, claiming first-place overall at the race to Dakar at the start of 2022. In what Jones stated to be one of the hardest fought battles in his racing career, the win almost slipped through his fingers after a broken differential would cost the pair almost 18 minutes, cutting into their lead and putting them 01’41’’ behind the first place position. Jones would strip the SSV and push hard during the race's final stage, claiming victory with one of the narrowest margins of the rally, winning by only 02’37’’. While Jones did not win a stage during the rally, as the General Ranking leader for 8 of the 13 stages, he was able to drive smart and strategically.

It was initially reported that Gerard Farres who was starting the final day of the rally in 1st position with a comfortable lead suffered electrical problems in the final stage resulting in a win for Jones. However, it was later revealed that Farres had been told that he needed to slow down in the final stage to allow Jones to win the event. Fares was quoted saying "When we saw we were leading the Dakar on the second last day of the race, we realized we would have a problem.”

== Sponsors ==
Jones drives for the Red Bull Off-Road Junior Team USA By BFGoodrich.

== Racing record ==
=== Dakar Rally ===
Year	Class	Vehicle	Position	Stages won
2020	SSV	(Canada) Can-Am	8th	0
2021	SSV	(Canada) Can-Am	2nd	2
2022	SSV	(Canada) Can-Am	1st	0
2023	Light Prototypes	(Canada) Can-Am	1st	1
2024	Challenger	(Canada) Can-Am	5th	0

=== Complete World Rally-Raid Championship results ===
(key)

Year	Team	Car	Class	1	2	3	4	5	Pos.	Points
2022	Can-Am Factory South Racing	BRP Can-Am Maverick XRS	T4	DAK; 1^{83}	ABU; 3^{39}	MOR; 5^{28}	AND; 3^{17}		3rd	167
2023	Red Bull Off-Road Junior Team USA by BFG	BRP Can-Am Maverick XRS	T3	DAK; 1^{83}	ABU; 2^{39}	SON; 3^{24}	DES; 3^{25}	MOR; 7^{19}	3rd	190
2024	Can-Am Factory Team	Maverick XRS Turbo	T3	DAK; 5^{48}	ABU; 1^{52}	PRT; 6^{26}	DES	MOR	4th	126

* Season still in progress

Sporting positions
Preceded by Francisco López Contardo	Dakar Rally; SSV winner 2022	Succeeded by Eryk Goczał
Preceded by Francisco López Contardo	Dakar Rally; Lightweight Prototypes winner 2023	Succeeded by incumbent
