= Eryk Goczał =

Polish rally driver

- Nationality: (Poland) Polish
- Born: 6 November 2004 (age 22)
- Relatives: Marek Goczał (father); Michal Goczał (uncle)

Eryk Goczał (born 6 November 2004) is a Polish rally driver who currently competes in the World Rally-Raid Championship. Goczał won the Dakar Rally on debut in 2023 the SSV category, making him the youngest driver to win any category in the event.

Goczał is the son of Energylandia owner and rally-raid driver Marek Goczał.

== Career ==
Goczał began driving in rally in 2019, driving a zero car for race organizers at events such as the Baja Europe and the Polish Rally-Raid championship. In 2021, he began competing in the Polish Drift Championship, where he won the BMP class in 2022. Goczał received his FIA competitive license in 2022 and entered the World Rally-Raid Championship in 2023 championship for his father's team. At the 2023 Dakar Rally, Goczał became the youngest driver to start the event, the youngest driver to win a stage, and the youngest driver to win overall in the event's history.

== Rally results ==
=== Dakar Rally ===
Year	Class	Vehicle	Position	Stages won
2023	SSV	(Canada) Can-Am	1st	4
2024	Challenger	(Netherlands) Taurus	DSQ	-
2026	Car	(Japan) Toyota	17th	1

=== Complete World Rally-Raid Championship results ===
(key)

Year	Team	Car	Class	1	2	3	4	5	Pos.	Points
2023	Energylandia Rally Team	Can-Am Maverick XRS	T4	DAK; 1	ABU	SON	DES	MOR	3rd	86
2025	Overdrive Racing	Toyota Hilux Overdrive	Ultimate	DAK	ABU; 27^{8}	ZAF			23rd	19
2025	Energylandia Rally Team	Toyota Hilux IMT Evo	Ultimate				PRT; 44^{2}	MOR; 8^{9}	23rd	19
2026	Energylandia Rally Team	Toyota GR Hilux	Ultimate	DAK; 17^{11}	PRT	DES	MOR	ABU	17th*	11*

* Season still in progress.

Sporting positions
Preceded by Austin Jones	Dakar Rally; SSV winner 2023	Succeeded by incumbent
