= Janus van Kasteren =

Dutch rally driver

- Nationality: (Netherlands) Dutch
- Born: 10 September 1986 (age 40) Veldhoven,The Netherlands

Janus van Kasteren Jr. (born 10 September 1986) is a Dutch rally driver and businessman. He is the owner of Boss Machinery, a heavy machinery supplier based out of Veldhoven and Neoforce (a software company based in Heerlen). van Kasteren is best known for his participation in rally raid events in rally trucks. He is the winner of the 2023 Dakar Rally in the trucks category. In 2023, van Kasteren began participating in the World Rally-Raid Championship.

== Dakar Rally results ==
Year	Class	Vehicle	Position	Stages won
2018	Trucks	(France) Renault	DNF	0
2019	Trucks	(France) Renault	DNF	0
2020	Trucks	(Italy) Iveco	6th	0
2022	Trucks	(Italy) Iveco	5th	0
2023	Trucks	(Italy) Iveco	1st	3
2024	Trucks	(Italy) Iveco	4th	4

Sporting positions
Preceded by Dmitry Sotnikov	Dakar Rally; Truck winner 2023	Succeeded by Martin Macík
