= Francisco López Contardo =

Chilean rally driver (born 1975)

"Chaleco" Lopez
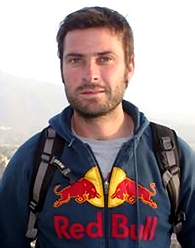
- Nationality: (Chile) Chilean
- Full name: Francisco Lopez Contardo
- Born: 15 September 1975 (age 51) Curicó, Chile
- Current team: Red Bull Can-Am Factory Team

Championship titles
- 2019 2021 2022 2022: Dakar Rally (SSV/T4); Dakar Rally (Lightweight Prototypes/T3); World Rally-Raid Championship

Francisco "Chaleco" López Contardo (born 15 September 1975) is a rally raid, motocross and enduro motorcycle rider and Off-road racing driver. He's a veteran of the Dakar Rally, having made his first start on a bike in 2007, and has since then won the rally the UTV/SSV (T4) class in 2019 & 2021; and, in the Lightweight Prototypes (T3) class in 2022.

López Contardo also took part in inaugural edition of the World Rally-Raid Championship in 2022, winning in the T3 category.

López Contardo began riding motorcycles at the age of four through the encouragement of his father Renato López, a national motocross champion. His nickname Chaleco comes from the Spanish for vest, particularly the vest used for race protection.

== Career ==
In 1989, López Contardo came first in the Latin American Motocross Championship in the 85cc class, which resulted in him becoming an official Honda rider. Between 1990 and 1994, he competed in the Chilean National Motocross Championship 125cc category, and was placed twice and won twice, and between 1995 and 2000 in the 250cc category of the same competition was placed once and won five times. He also won the Latin American Supercross Championship in 1998.

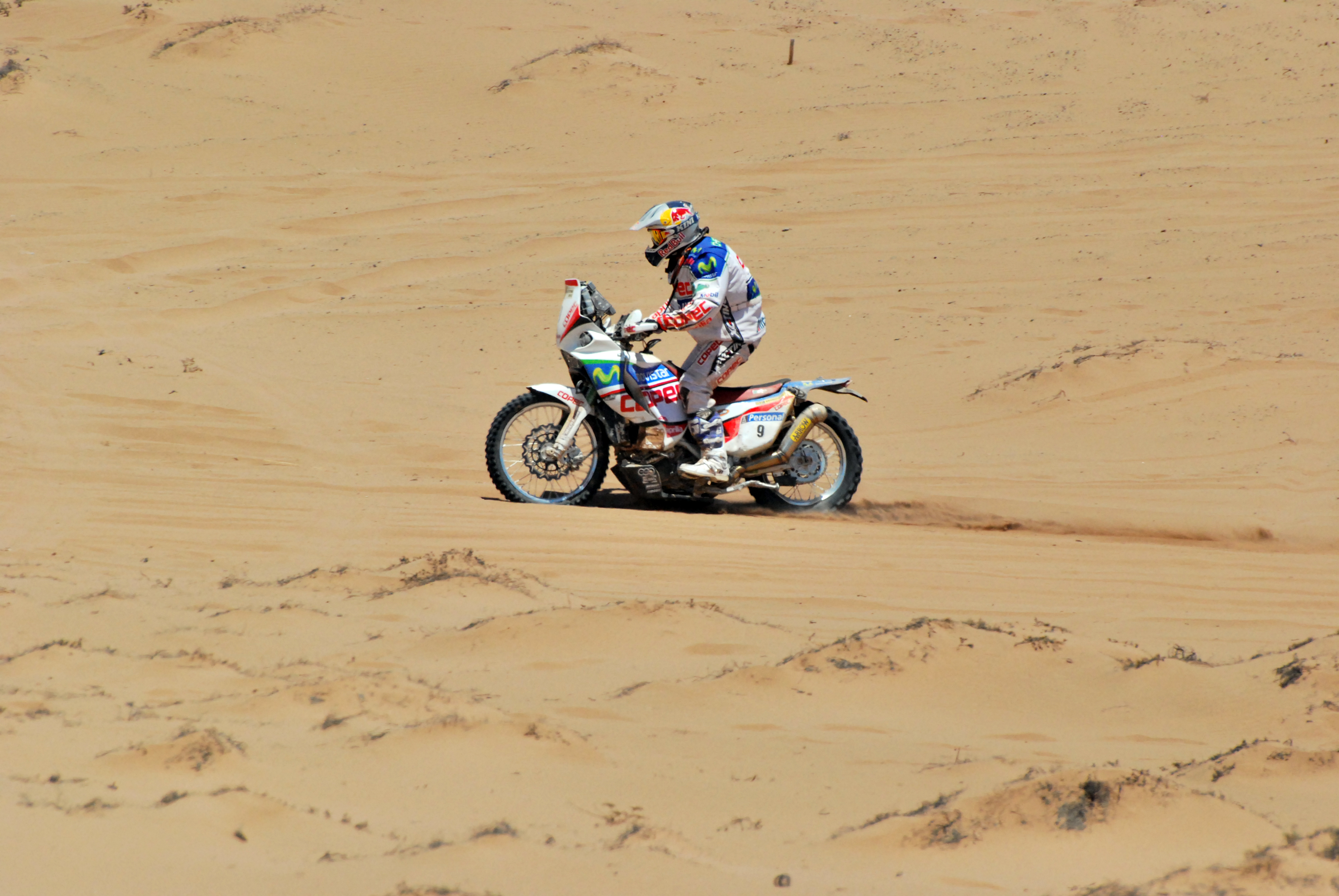
Lopez in the 2010 Dakar Rally, near Copiapó.

In 2001, López Contardo became the first Chilean rider to receive a gold medal in the Six Days of France competition at Brive-la-Gaillarde. The following year he rode in the 250cc four-stroke endurance world championship in Finland, gaining eighth place. He finished tenth overall in the 500cc four-stroke category in the same event in 2003. After a gold medal in the 2003 Six Days of Brazil competition at Fortaleza, he was named as "best rider of year" by Chilean sports' journalists.

In 2004, López Contardo was national runner-up in super enduro, and participated again in the National Motocross Championship, and in Supermotard competitions. The following year, he made his competitive debut in the Patagonia-Atacama Rally, withdrew through mechanical problems after winning the fourth stage, but finished in fourth position overall. He also debuted at the National Championship Motocross Entel, coming second in the 250cc category.

In 2006, López Contardo was placed first in the 450cc category of Patagonia-Atacama Rally, second in the d'Italia Sardegna Rally (Italy), and second in the 450cc category of the Morocco Rally.

López Contardo participated for the first time in the Dakar Rally in 2007 but had to withdraw during the race. The 2008 Dakar Rally was cancelled as a competition and replaced by an alternative, the 2008 Central Europe Rally, in which López Contardo finished second. He returned to Dakar in 2009, winning the first stage and finishing seventh overall. The same year he was placed third in the Tunisia Rally. In the 2010 Dakar Rally, he won the fifth, eighth and twelfth stage, was awarded first place in the 450cc category and third place overall. His Dakar third place, a position shared with his compatriot Carlo de Gavardo who competed in the 2001 Dakar Rally, is the highest placing of a Latin American at Dakar.

== Honours ==
Year	Tournament	Result
1989	Latin American Motocross Championship	1st
1990	National Motocross Championship(125cc.)	2nd
1991	National Motocross Championship(125cc.)	1st
1992	National Motocross Championship(125cc.)	3rd
1993	National Motocross Championship(125cc.)	1st
1994	National Motocross Championship(125cc.)	1st
1995	National Motocross Championship (250cc.)	2nd
1996	National Motocross Championship (250cc.)	1st
1997	National Motocross Championship (250cc.)	1st
1998	National Motocross Championship (250cc.)	1st
1998	Latin American Supercross Championship	1st
1999	National Motocross Championship (250cc.)	1st
2000	National Motocross Championship (250cc.)	1st
2001	Six Days of France	Gold medal
2003	Six Days of Brazil	Gold medal
2006	Patagonia–Atacama Rally	1st
2006	d'Italia Sardegna Rally	2nd
2006	Morocco Rally (450cc.)	2nd
2008	Central Europe Rally	2nd
2009	Tunisia Rally	3rd
2010	Dakar Rally	3rd
2010	Tunisia Rally	1st
2011	2011 Dakar Rally	4th
2012	2012 Dakar Rally	DNF
2013	2013 Dakar Rally	3rd
2014	2014 Dakar Rally	DNF
2014	Desafío Guaraní 2014	1st
2017	Rally Mobil 2017, R2 category	1st
2019	2019 Dakar Rally, UTV's	1st
2020	2020 Dakar Rally, UTV's	3rd
2021	2021 Dakar Rally, UTV's	1st
2022	2022 Dakar Rally, T3	1st
2022	2022 World Rally-Raid Championship, T3	1st
2023	2022 Dakar Rally T3	5th
2023	2022 World Rally-Raid Championship, T3	5th*

== Racing record ==
=== Dakar Rally ===
Year	Class	Vehicle	Position	Stages won
2007	Bikes	(Japan) Honda	Ret	0
2009	Bikes	(Austria) KTM	Ret	1
2010	Bikes	(Italy) Aprilia	3rd	3
2011	Bikes	(Italy) Aprilia	4th	1
2012	Bikes	(Italy) Aprilia	Ret	1
2013	Bikes	(Austria) KTM	3rd	5
2014	Bikes	(Austria) KTM	Ret	0
2019	SSV	(Canada) Can-Am	1st	4
2020	SSV	(Canada) Can-Am	3rd	2
2021	SSV	(Canada) Can-Am	1st	6
2022	Light Prototypes	(Canada) Can-Am	1st	0
2023	Light Prototypes	(Canada) Can-Am	5th	1
2024	Light Prototypes	(Canada) Can-Am	4th	1

=== Complete World Rally-Raid Championship results ===
(key)

Year	Team	Car	Class	1	2	3	4	5	Pos.	Points
2022	Can-Am Factory South Racing	BRP Can-Am Maverick XRS	T3	DAK; 1	ABU; 1	MOR; 2	AND; 3		1st	199
2023	Red Bull Off-Road Junior Team USA by BFG	BRP Can-Am Maverick XRS	T3	DAK; 5	ABU	SON	DES	MOR	4th*	55*

* Season still in progress
