= Luciano Benavides =

Argentine motorcycle racer

- Nationality: Argentine
- Born: June 15, 1995 (age 31) Salta, Argentina

Dakar Rally career
- Debut season: 2018
- Starts: 9
- Wins: 1 (8 stage wins)
- Best finish: 1st in 2026

FIM Cross-Country Rallies World Championship career
- Debut season: 2019
- Wins: 1
- Best finish: 1st in 2023

Luciano Benavides is an Argentine rally raid motorcyclist who is best known for racing in the Dakar Rally and winning the 2023 World Rally-Raid Championship.

== Biography ==
Benavides is the brother of Kevin Benavides, also a rally raid biker.

Benavides got his start in rally raid racing at the Desafio Ruta 40 in Argentina in August 2017 and has entered every Dakar Rally since 2018.

2023 saw success for Benavides, where he won the Desafio Ruta 40 in Argentina on his way to his 2023 World Rally-Raid Championship.

== Career results ==
=== Dakar Rally results ===
Year	Class	Vehicle	Position	Stage wins
2018	Bikes	(Austria) KTM	DNF	0
2019	Bikes	(Austria) KTM	9th	0
2020	Bikes	(Austria) KTM	6th	0
2021	Bikes	(Sweden) Husqvarna	DNF	0
2022	Bikes	(Sweden) Husqvarna	13th	0
2023	Bikes	(Sweden) Husqvarna	6th	3
2024	Bikes	(Sweden) Husqvarna	7th	0
2025	Bikes	(Austria) KTM	4th	2
2026	Bikes	(Austria) KTM	1st	3

== Other results ==
=== FIM Cross-Country Rallies World Championship & World Rally-Raid Championship ===
Year	Vehicle	Races	Wins	Podiums	Points	Position
2019	(Austria) KTM	4	0	1	73	4th
2021	(Sweden) Husqvarna	3	0	0	34	7th
2022	(Sweden) Husqvarna	4	0	2	53	4th
2023	(Sweden) Husqvarna	5	1	4	100	1st

=== Rally raid best overall results ===
Event	Podiums
(Argentina) Desafio Ruta 40	(silver) (1st in W2RC; 2023)
(Morocco) Rallye du Maroc	(silver) x3 (2018, 2022, 2023), (bronze) (2024)
(United Arab Emirates) Abu Dhabi Desert Challenge	(silver) x2 (2019, 2023)
(Chile) Atacama Rally	(silver) (2022)
(Mexico) Sonora Rally	(bronze) (2nd in W2RC; 2023)
(Spain) Andalucia Rally	(bronze) (2022)
