= Mathieu Baumel =

French rally co-driver (born 1976)

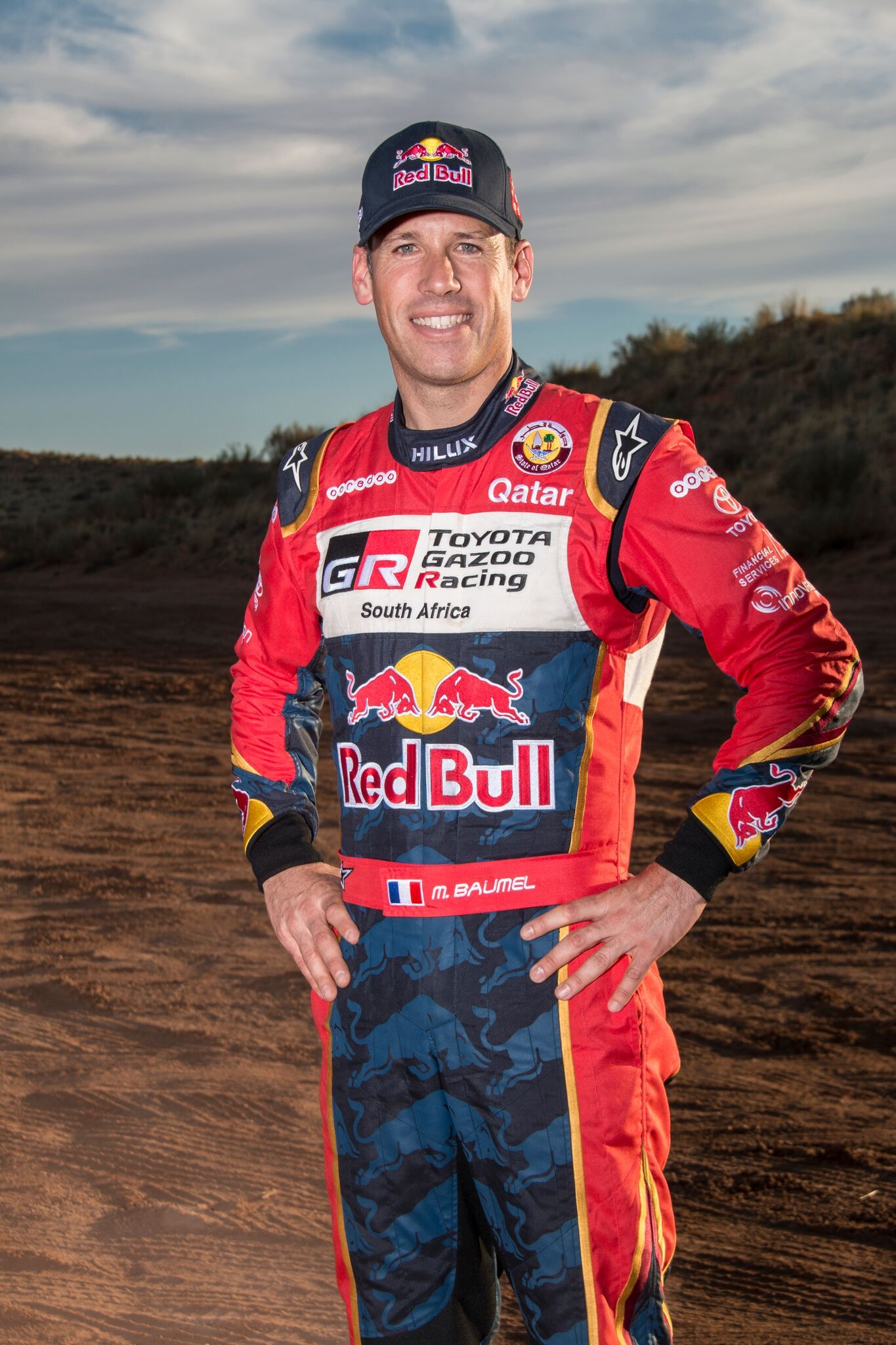
- Nationality: (France) French
- Born: 17 January 1976 (age 50) Manosque, Alpes-de-Haute-Provence, France

World Rally-Raid Championship career
- Current team: Overdrive Racing
- Former teams: X-raid, Toyota Gazoo Racing, Prodrive

Championship titles
- 2015, 2019 2021, 2022, 2023 2015, 2016, 2017, 2021 2022, 2023: Dakar Rally; FIA World Cup for Cross-Country Rallies; World Rally-Raid Championship

Mathieu Baumel (born 17 January 1976) is a French rally raid co-driver competing in the World Rally-Raid Championship. Alongside Nasser Al-Attiyah, he won the Dakar Rally five times, the FIA World Cup for Cross-Country Rallies four times, and the World Rally-Raid Championship twice.

Baumel parted ways with Al-Attiyah after the 2024 Dakar Rally. He reunited with Guerlain Chicherit, with whom he ran the 2005 and 2006 Dakar Rallies, for the BP Ultimate Rally-Raid Portugal later that year, before joining Guillaume De Mévius at the X-raid Mini JCW Team.

On 29 January 2025, Baumel was hit by a car whilst stopped to help the passengers of a broken down vehicle, later being placed into an induced coma. Baumel also suffered severe leg injuries, resulting in the amputation of his right leg. Baumel survived the injuries, and returned to co-driving at the 2026 Dakar Rally alongside De Mévius. At the event's first stage, he became the first amputee to win a Dakar stage.
