= Sergio Lafuente =

Uruguayan weightlifter (born 1966)

Personal information
- Nationality: Uruguayan
- Born: 22 May 1966 (age 59)

Sport
- Sport: Weightlifting

Sergio Lafuente (born 22 May 1966) is a Uruguayan weightlifter and rallying driver.

He competed in the men's light heavyweight event at the 1992 Summer Olympics.

In rallying, Lafuente finished 5th in the quads class at the 2012 Dakar Rally. He also won the quads class at the 2014 Desafío Ruta 40 and the 2017 Desafío Ruta 40 Sur. As a co-driver, he won the 2016 Desafío Ruta 40 in the car class.
