= 2025 Dakar Rally =

Off-road motorsport event in Saudi Arabia

Part of the Dakar Rally
← Previous event	Next event →
- Host country: Saudi Arabia
- Dates run: 3–17 January 2025
- Start: Bisha
- Finish: Shubaytah
- Stages: 12
- Stage surface: Sand, rocks, gravel, tarmac

Results
- Cars winner: (Saudi Arabia) Yazeed Al-Rajhi (Germany) Timo Gottschalk; Overdrive Racing
- Bikes winner: (Australia) Daniel Sanders; Red Bull KTM Factory Racing
- Challenger winner: (Argentina) Nicolás Cavigliasso (Argentina) Valentina Pertegarini; Team BBR
- SSVs winner: (United States) Brock Heger (United States) Max Eddy; Sebastien Loeb Racing – RZR Factory Racing
- Trucks winner: (Czech Republic) Martin Macík (Czech Republic) František Tomášek (Czech Republic) David Švanda; MM Technology
- Classics winner: (Spain) Carlos Santaolalla (Spain) Jan Rosa i Viñas; Factorytub
- Mission 1000 winner: (Spain) Jordi Juvanteny (Spain) José Luis Criado (Spain) Xavier Ribas; KH7-Ecovergy Team

The 2025 Dakar Rally was a rally raid event that took place in Saudi Arabia. It is the 47th edition of the Dakar Rally, organized by Amaury Sport Organisation (ASO), and the 6th time Saudi Arabia has hosted the event. The event took place from 3 to 17 January 2025. For the fourth year running, the event will also be the first round of the 2025 World Rally-Raid Championship.

== Background ==
The grand presentation and the outline of the race route took place on 18 May 2024 in Les Comes, targeting French and Spanish audience. The promo tour continued to South Africa, Italy, Mexico / USA, Argentina, Czech Republic, and the Netherlands.

This year the route started at Bisha, it crosses the Empty Quarter and will finish in Shubaytah. Race format consists of 14 days of racing, divided into 12 stages. There will be a 48-hour "chrono" marathon stage, covering 950km. Five stages will feature separate routes for cars and bikes. There will be one mass start stage. The organizers promised more navigation. New is a Mission 1000 category for vehicles with alternative zero-emission or hybrid drives.

This year, the Quad category was removed due to declining participation. Quads had been a part of the Dakar Rally since 2009.

== Timeline ==
- 18 May 2024: Route unveiled
- 18 May – 20 October 2024: Registrations
- 28–30 November 2024: Scrutineering and vehicle loading in Barcelona
- 30 December 2024: Vehicle offloading in Jeddah
- 1–2 January 2025: Final scrutineering in Bisha
- 3 January 2025: Starting podium and the Prologue Stage
- 17 January 2025: Race finish and finish podium

== Entry list ==
In November 2024 ASO announced the list of competitors. Quads were dropped from this years edition due to declining manufacturer support.

=== Number of entries ===
Stage	Bikes	Cars	Challenger (T3)	SSV (T4)	Trucks	Total	Classic Cars	Classic Trucks	Total Dakar Classic
Entry list (Note: As of 29 November, before scrutineering.)	136	67	54	51	45	353	76	19	95
At start line	134	67	52	51	44	335	76	19	95
Rest day (Note: At start line after the rest day.)	114	59	45	33	43	294	69	19	88
Finished (Note: To rank in the final standings, the vehicle had to pass through the finishing podium.)	89	50	36	31	18	224	63	17	80

=== Vehicles and Categories ===
Vehicles and Categories

The 2025 event had changes to for the Classic vehicles. The averages changed from 15% and 30% to 5% and 10%, and the periods saw Period B changing from 1986–1996 to 1986–1998 and Period C from 1996 onwards to 1999–2005. Group H2.C also allowed all qualifying vehicles instead of restricting vehicles with leaf springs.

Bikes		Cars		Challenger		SSV		Trucks		Classic Cars		Classic Trucks	
Class	Description	Class	Description	Class	Description	Class	Description	Class	Description	Description	Class	Description	Class
RallyGP	FIM World Rally-Raid Championship, Moto Rally	T1.+ Ultimate	Prototype Cross-Country Cars 4x4	T3.U	“Ultimate” lightweight Prototype Cross-Country Vehicles	SSV1	Cross-Country Side-by-Side (SSV) Vehicles turbo up to 1050cc and atmo from 1050cc to 2000cc	T5.U	“Ultimate” prototype Cross-Country Trucks	−86 Low Average	H1.A	−86 Low Average	H1t.A
Rally2	FIM World Rally-Raid Cup, Moto Rally (up to 450cc)	T1.1 Ultimate	Prototype Cross-Country Cars 4x4	T3.1	Lightweight Prototype Cross-Country Vehicles	SSV2	Cross-Country Side-by-Side (SSV) Vehicles atmo up to 1050cc	T5.1	Prototype and Production Cross-Country Trucks	−86 Moderate Average	H2.A	−86 Moderate Average	H2t.A
		T1.2 Ultimate	Prototype Cross-Country Cars 4x2			T4	Modified Production Cross-Country Side-by-Side	T5.2	Race Service Trucks	−86 Intermediate Average	H3.A	86–98 Low Average	H1t.B
		STK Stock	Series Production Cross-Country Cars							86–98 Low Average	H1.B	86–98 Moderate Average	H2t.B
		T2.1 Stock	Production Cross-Country Cars							86–98 Moderate Average	H2.B	99-05 Low Average	H1t.C
		T2.2 Stock	Production Cross-Country Vehicles with expired certification							86–98 Intermediate Average	H3.B	99-05 Moderate Average	H2t.C
										86–98 High Average	H4.B		
										99-05 Moderate Average	H2.C		
										99-05 Intermediate Average	H3.C		
										99-05 High Average	H4.C		

=== Competitor list ===
Entry list – Bikes

Note
– "Dakar Legends": competitors that participated in 10 or more Dakar events.
– "Rookies": competitors who will participate for the first time.
– Competitors that were not able to start the race.
– "Original by Motul" — Competitors participating in the "Original by Motul", previously known as "Malle Moto", a marathon class with limited assistance.
^{VJW} – Subclasses for Veteran, Junior, Women.

No.	Driver	Bike	Team	Class
1	(Botswana) Ross Branch	Hero 450 Rally	Hero MotoSports Team Rally	RallyGP
4	(Australia) Daniel Sanders	KTM 450 Rally Factory	Red Bull KTM Factory Racing	RallyGP
7	(Chile) Pablo Quintanilla	Honda CRF 450 Rally	Monster Energy Honda HRC	RallyGP
9	(United States) Ricky Brabec	Honda CRF 450 Rally	Monster Energy Honda HRC	RallyGP
10	(United States) Skyler Howes	Honda CRF 450 Rally	Monster Energy Honda HRC	RallyGP
11	(Chile) José Ignacio Cornejo	Hero 450 Rally	Hero MotoSports Team Rally	RallyGP
12	(South Africa) Bradley Cox	KTM 450 Rally Replica	BAS World KTM Racing Team	RallyGP
13	(Czech Republic) Martin Michek	KTM 450 Rally Replica	Orion – Moto Racing Group	RallyGP
14	(Germany) Sebastian Bühler	Hero 450 Rally	Hero MotoSports Team Rally	RallyGP
15	(Spain) Lorenzo Santolino	Sherco 450 SEF Rally	Sherco Rally Factory	RallyGP
17	(United Arab Emirates) Mohammed Balooshi	Fantic XEF 450 Rally Factory	Fantic Racing Rally Team	RallyGP
19	(Portugal) Rui Gonçalves	Sherco 450 SEF Rally	Sherco Rally Factory	RallyGP
24	(South Africa) Aaron Mare	Husqvarna 450 Rally Factory Replica	HT Rally Raid	RallyGP
30	(Portugal) Antonio Maio	Yamaha WR450F Rally	Franco Sport Yamaha Racing Team	RallyGP
42	(France) Adrien Van Beveren	Honda CRF 450 Rally	Monster Energy Honda HRC	RallyGP
47	(Argentina) Kevin Benavides	KTM 450 Rally Factory	Red Bull KTM Factory Racing	RallyGP
54	(Bolivia) Daniel Nosiglia Jager	Rieju 450 Rally Replica	Rieju – Pedregà Team	RallyGP
68	(Spain) Tosha Schareina	Honda CRF 450 Rally	Monster Energy Honda HRC	RallyGP
77	(Argentina) Luciano Benavides	KTM 450 Rally Factory	Red Bull KTM Factory Racing	RallyGP
98	(United States) Mason Klein	Kove 450 Rally	Kove	RallyGP
142	(Slovakia) Štefan Svitko	KTM 450 Rally Replica	Slovnaft Rally Team	RallyGP
16	(France) Romain Dumontier	Honda CRF 450	Honda HRC	Rally2
18	(Czech Republic) Jan Brabec	KTM 450 Rally Replica	Stojrent Racing	Rally2
20	(India) Harith Noah	Sherco 450 SEF Rally	Sherco Rally Factory	Rally2
21	(France) Mathieu Doveze	KTM 450 Rally Replica	BAS World KTM Racing Team	Rally2
22	(South Africa) Michael Docherty	KTM 450 Rally Replica	BAS World KTM Racing Team	Rally2
23	(United States) Jacob Argubright	Honda CRF 450 Rally	Rsmoto Honda Rally Team	Rally2
25	(Belgium) Jerome Martiny	Husqvarna 450 Rally Replica	Anquety Motorsport	Rally2
26	(Poland) Konrad Dabrowski	KTM 450 Rally Replica	Duust Rally Team	Rally2^{J}
27	(Ecuador) Juan Puga	KTM 450 Rally Replica	KTM Jp1 Motorcycles	Rally2
28	(Slovenia) Toni Mulec	KTM 450 Rally Replica	BAS World KTM Racing Team	Rally2
29	(Italy) Paolo Lucci	Honda CRF 450 Rally	Rsmoto Honda Rally Team	Rally2
31	(France) Jeremy Miroir	Fantic XEF 450 Rally Factory	Fantic Racing Rally Team	Rally2
32	(France) David Casteu	Husqvarna 450 Rally Replica	Team Casteu Trophy	Rally2^{V}
33	(Czech Republic) Milan Engel	KTM 450 Rally Replica	Orion – Moto Racing Group	Rally2
34	(Romania) Emanuel Gyenes	KTM 450 Rally Replica	Autonet Motorcycle Team	Rally2
35	(Portugal) Bruno Santos	Husqvarna 450 Rally Replica	Bs – Frutas Patricia Pilar	Rally2
36	(Italy) Tommaso Montanari	Fantic XEF 450 Rally Factory	Fantic Racing Rally Team	Rally2
38	(Spain) Eduardo Iglesias Sanchez	KTM 450 Rally Replica	Team Monforte Rally – Galicia	Rally2^{V}
39	(France) Benjamin Melot	KTM 450 Rally Replica	Esprit KTM	Rally2
40	(Czech Republic) Martin Prokes	KTM 450 Rally Replica	Moto Racing Group	Rally2
43	(France) Julien Dalbec	KTM 450 Rally Replica	Nomade Racing	Rally2
44	(Spain) Josep Pedro Subirats	Rieju 450 Rally Replica	Rieju – Pedregà Team	Rally2
45	(China) Sunier Sunier	Kove 450 Rally	Supesunr Kove Team	Rally2
48	(Czech Republic) David Pabiska	KTM 450 Rally Replica	Sp Moto Bohemia	Rally2^{V}
49	(Argentina) Juan Santiago Rostan	Gas Gas 450 Rally Factory Replica	Xraids Experience	Rally2
50	(United Kingdom) James Hillier	Kove 450 Rally	Wtf Racing	Rally2
51	(Spain) Rachid Al-lal Lahadil	Husqvarna 450 Rally Replica	Melilla Ciudad Del Deporte	Rally2^{V}
52	(France) Marshall Meplon	KTM 450 Rally Replica	Solurent Racing	Rally2
53	(Denmark) Thomas Kongshoj	KTM 450 Rally Replica	Joyride Race Service	Rally2
55	(China) Zhang Min	KTM 450 Rally Replica	Da Hai Dao Zero Mileage Lubricant	Rally2^{V}
56	(China) Zhao Hongyi	KTM 450 Rally Replica	Da Hai Dao Zero Mileage Lubricant	Rally2
57	(China) Fang Xiangliang	Hoto Rally	Hoto Factory Racing	Rally2^{J}
58	(China) Zakeer Yakefu	KTM 450 Rally Replica	Da Hai Dao Zero Mileage Lubricant	Rally2
59	(Poland) Bartlomiej Tabin	Husqvarna 450 Rally Replica	Moto Racing Group (mrg)	Rally2^{V}
60	(France) Arnaud Domet	Gas Gas 450 Rally Replica	Team Casteu Trophy	Rally2
61	(France) Bertrand Domet	Gas Gas 450 Rally Replica	Team Casteu Trophy	Rally2
62	(Australia) Andrew Joseph Houlihan	KTM 450 Rally Replica	Nomadas Adventure	Rally2^{V}
63	(France) Jeremie Gerber	KTM 450 Rally Replica	Tld Racing	Rally2
64	(Switzerland) Alexandre Vaudan	KTM 450 Rally Replica	Team Casteu Trophy	Rally2
65	(France) Guillaume Chollet	KTM 450 Rally Replica	Xraids Experience	Rally2
66	(France) Neels Theric	Kove 450 Rally	Kove	Rally2
69	(Guatemala) Francisco Arredondo	KTM 450 Rally Replica	BAS World KTM Racing Team	Rally2^{V}
70	(Saudi Arabia) Mishal Alghuneim	KTM 450 Replica	Cloudracing	Rally2
71	(Lithuania) Modestas Siliūnas	KTM 450 Rally Replica	Flexit Go – AG Dakar School	Rally2
72	(France) Philippe Gendron	KTM 450 Rally Replica	Nomade Racing	Rally2^{V}
73	(Spain) Edgar Canet	KTM 450 Rally Replica	Red Bull KTM Factory Racing	Rally2^{J}
74	(France) Michael Jacobi	Gas Gas 450 Rally Replica	Môleagriforest /maglandraceway	Rally2
75	(China) Deng Liansong	Kove 450 Rally	Supesunr Kove Team	Rally2
76	(France) Stéphane Darques	Husqvarna 450 Rally Replica	Motorbike Off Road Adventures Lyberty	Rally2^{V}
78	(Italy) Lorenzo Maestromi	Honda CRF 450 Rally	Rsmoto Honda Rally Team	Rally2^{V}
79	(France) Maxime Pouponnot	Fantic XEF 450 Rally Factory	Fantic Racing	Rally2
80	(Saudi Arabia) Abdulhalim Almogheera	KTM 450 Rally Replica	Haleem	Rally2
81	(Italy) Cesare Zacchetti	Kove 450 Rally Ex	Team Kove Italia	Rally2^{V}
82	(Italy) Andrea Giuseppe Fili Winkler	KTM 450 Rally Replica	Motoclub Yashica	Rally2
83	(France) Fabien Domas	Gas Gas 450 Rally Replica	Team Rs Concept	Rally2^{V}
84	(Greece) Vasileios Boudros	Husqvarna 450 Rally Replica	Dna Air Filters Racing Team- Enduro Greece	Rally2
85	(Italy) Manuel Lucchese	Husqvarna 450 Rally Replica	Team Rebel x	Rally2
86	(France) Charlie Herbst	Gas Gas RX 450	Challenger Racing Team	Rally2
87	(Lebanon) Ehab Al Hakeem	KTM 450 Rally Replica	Desert Storm Racing	Rally2
88	(Lithuania) Arūnas Gelažninkas	Hoto Rally	Hoto Factory Racing	Rally2
89	(Colombia) Francisco Alvarez Niño	KTM 450 Rally Replica	Joyride Race Service	Rally2
90	(Uruguay) Alvaro Iris Coppola Gutierrez	KTM 450 Rally Replica	Med Racing Team	Rally2^{V}
91	(Germany) Mike Wiedemann	KTM 450 Rally Replica	Mike Wiedemann	Rally2
92	(Czech Republic) Jiri Broz	KTM 450 Rally Replica	BAS World KTM Racing Team	Rally2
93	(Italy) Tiziano Interno	Honda CRF 450 Rally	Rally Pov	Rally2
94	(Czech Republic) Dusan Drdaj	KTM 450 Rally Replica	Cajdašrot	Rally2
95	(France) Xavier Flick	Hoto Rally	Hoto Factory Racing	Rally2
96	(Austria) Tobias Ebster	KTM 450 Rally Replica	BAS World KTM Racing Team	Rally2
97	(Czech Republic) Jaromir Romancik	KTM 450 Rally Replica	Moto Racing Group (mrg)	Rally2
99	(Spain) Javier Vega Puerta	Kove 450 Rally Ex	Pont Grup – Kove	Rally2
100	(Spain) Sandra Gomez Cantero	Fantic XEF 450 Rally Factory	Fantic Racing Rally Team	Rally2^{W}
101	(Italy) Iader Giraldi	KTM 450 Rally Replica	Zeranta	Rally2^{V}
102	(Spain) Ignacio Sanchis	KTM 450 Rally Replica	Club Aventura Touareg	Rally2^{V}
103	(Lithuania) Gediminas Šatkus	KTM 450 Rally Replica	AG Dakar School – Dubai	Rally2
104	(Slovenia) Simon Marcic	Husqvarna 450 Rally Replica	Team Marcic	Rally2
105	(France) Jean-philippe Révolte	KTM 450 Rally Replica	Révolte Racing	Rally2
106	(Norway) Axel Mustad	Husqvarna 450 Rally Replica	HT Rally Raid	Rally2
107	(Lebanon) Eid Rafic	GasGas Fantic 450 Rally Replica	Mx Academy	Rally2^{V}
108	(Spain) Marc Calmet	Rieju 450 Rally Replica	Rieju – Pedregá Team	Rally2
109	(Spain) Oscar Hernandez Panos	KTM 450 Rally Replica	Adec Competicio Total Team	Rally2
110	(Spain) Juanjo Martinez Garcia	KTM 450 Rally Replica	Adec Competicio Total Team	Rally2
111	(Germany) Justin Gerlach	KTM FR 450 Rally	Duust Rally Team	Rally2^{J}
112	(South Africa) Willem Avenant	Husqvarna 450 Rally Replica	HT Rally Raid	Rally2
113	(Portugal) Gad Nachmani	KTM 450 Rally Replica	Club Aventura Touareg	Rally2^{V}
114	(South Africa) Dwain Barnard	KTM 450 Rally Replica	Nomade Racing	Rally2
115	(France) Mathieu Feuvrier	Husqvarna 450 Rally Replica	Nomade Racing	Rally2
116	(Canada) Jordan Strachan	Kove 450 Rally	Kove Canada	Rally2
117	(Italy) Ottavio Missoni	Kove Rally 450 Ex	Team Kove Italia Lucky Explorer	Rally2
118	(Paraguay) Rolando Alfredo Martinez Paredes	KTM 450 Rally Replica	Xraids Experience	Rally2
119	(Lithuania) Mykolas Paulavičius	KTM 450 Rally Replica	Joyride Race Service	Rally2
120	(France) Jim Moisa	KTM 450 Rally Replica	Enduro Normandie	Rally2
121	(France) Alexandre Yon	KTM 450 Rally Replica	Enduro Normandie	Rally2
122	(France) Thomas Georgin	KTM 450 Rally Replica	Enduro Normandie	Rally2
123	(Uruguay) Fabian Von Thuengen	Husqvarna FR450	HT Rally Raid	Rally2
124	(Saudi Arabia) Badr Alhamdan	Kove 450 Rally	Desert Storm Racing	Rally2
125	(France) Damien Bataller	KTM 450 Rally Replica	Team Db Racing	Rally2
126	(Australia) Toby Hedericks	KTM 450 Rally Replica	BAS World KTM Racing Team	Rally2
127	(Czech Republic) Adam Peschel	Husqvarna 450 Rally Replica	Fesh Fesh	Rally2
128	(France) Max Bianucci	Husqvarna 450 Rally Replica	Nomade Racing	Rally2
129	(India) Jatin Jain	Kove 450 Rally	Jatin Jain	Rally2^{V}
130	(Lithuania) Nerimantas Jucius	Husqvarna 450 Rally Replica	HT Rally Raid	Rally2
131	(Saudi Arabia) Ahmed Aljaber	KTM 450 Rally Replica	Hleem	Rally2
132	(Ecuador) Carlos Alfonso Malo Peña	KTM 450 Rally Replica	Med Racing Team	Rally2^{V}
133	(Spain) Gines Belzunces Viudez	KTM 450 Rally Replica	Club Aventura Touareg	Rally2
134	(France) Clément Artaud	KTM 450 Rally Replica	Team Rs Concept	Rally2
135	(France) Benjamin Bourdariat	KTM 450 Rally Replica	Team Rs Concept	Rally2
136	(Spain) Ferran Zaragoza Rosa	KTM 450 Rally Replica	Pedregà Team	Rally2
137	(Switzerland) Yann Di Mauro	Honda CRF 450 Rally	Rsmoto Honda Rally Team	Rally2
138	(Spain) Ivan Merichal Resina	KTM 450 Rally Replica	Casas Cube – Ártabros Rally	Rally2
139	(Bahrain) Salman Mohamed Humood Farhan	KTM 450 Rally Replica	Cloudracing	Rally2
140	(Switzerland) Dennis Mildenberger	KTM 450 Rally Replica	Nomadas Adventure	Rally2^{V}
141	(Mongolia) Murun Purevdorj	KTM 450 Rally Replica	Nomadas Adventure	Rally2
143	(United Kingdom) Robbie Wallace	KTM 450 Rally Replica	Xraids Experience	Rally2
144	(India) Ashish Raorane	KTM 450 Rally Replica	Xraids Experience	Rally2
148	(Chile) Tomas De Gavardo	Fantic XEF 450 Rally Factory	Fantic Racing Rally Team	Rally2

Entry list – Cars

Note
– The "Dakar Legends" – competitors that participated in 10 or more Dakar events.
– The first time starters – "rookies".
– Competitors that were not able to start the race.

No.	Driver	Co-driver	Vehicle	Team	Class
200	(Qatar) Nasser Al-Attiyah	(France) Edouard Boulanger	Dacia Sandrider	The Dacia Sandriders	T1.+
201	(Saudi Arabia) Yazeed Al-Rajhi	(Germany) Timo Gottschalk	Toyota Hilux Overdrive	Overdrive Racing	T1.+
202	(France) Guerlain Chicherit	(France) Alexandre Winocq	Mini JCW Rally 3.0i	X-raid Mini JCW Team	T1.+
203	(Brazil) Lucas Moraes	(Spain) Armand Monleon	Toyota GR DKR Hilux	Toyota Gazoo Racing	T1.+
204	(United States) Seth Quintero	(Germany) Dennis Zenz	Toyota GR DKR Hilux	Toyota Gazoo Racing	T1.+
205	(South Africa) Guy David Botterill	(South Africa) Dennis Murphy	Toyota Hilux	Imt Evo Toyota Gazoo Racing	T1.+
206	(South Africa) Giniel de Villiers	(Germany) Dirk Von Zitzewitz	Toyota Hilux	Imt Evo Toyota Gazoo Racing	T1.+
207	(France) Jean-Luc Ceccaldi	(France) Delphine Delfino	MD Optimus	Jlc Racing	T1.2
208	(Lithuania) Benediktas Vanagas	(Poland) Szymon Gospodarczyk	Toyota Hilux	Gurtam Toyota Gazoo Racing Baltics	T1.+
209	(France) Mathieu Serradori	(France) Loic Minaudier	Century CR7	Century Racing Factory Team	T1.+
210	(Lithuania) Rokas Baciuška	(Spain) Oriol Mena	Toyota Hilux Overdrive	Overdrive Racing	T1.+
211	(South Africa) Henk Lategan	(South Africa) Brett Cummings	Toyota Hilux	Imt Evo Toyota Gazoo Racing	T1.+
212	(Spain) Cristina Gutiérrez	(Spain) Pablo Moreno	Dacia Sandrider	The Dacia Sandriders	T1.+
213	(France) Christian Lavieille	(France) Valentin Sarreaud	MD Optimus	MD Rallye Sport	T1.2
214	(South Africa) Brian Baragwanath	(South Africa) Leonard Cremer	Century CR7	Century Racing Factory Team	T1.+
215	(China) Guoyu Zhang	(China) Yicheng Wang	Toyota Hilux	Mintimes Yunxiang Rally Team	T1.+
216	(Argentina) Juan Cruz Yacopini	(Spain) Daniel Oliveras	Toyota Hilux Overdrive	Overdrive Racing	T1.+
217	(Kyrgyzstan) Denis Krotov	Konstantin Zhiltsov	Mini JCW Rally 3.0i	X-raid Mini JCW Team	T1.+
218	(South Africa) Saood Variawa	(France) Francois Cazalet	Toyota Hilux	Imt Evo Toyota Gazoo Racing	T1.+
219	(France) Sébastien Loeb	(Belgium) Fabian Lurquin	Dacia Sandrider	The Dacia Sandriders	T1.+
220	(China) Wei Han	(China) Li Ma	Red-lined Hwm T1+	Hanwei Motorsport Team	T1.+
221	(Czech Republic) Martin Prokop	(Czech Republic) Viktor Chytka	Ford Raptor	Orlen Jipocar Team	T1.+
222	(Belgium) Guillaume De Mévius	(France) Mathieu Baumel	Mini JCW Rally 3.0i	X-raid Mini JCW Team	T1.+
223	(Spain) Laia Sanz	(Italy) Maurizio Gerini	Century CR6-T	Century Racing Factory Team	T1.2
224	(France) Lionel Baud	(France) Lucie Baud	Mini JCW Rally 3.0d	X-raid Mini JCW Team	T1.+
225	(Spain) Carlos Sainz	(Spain) Lucas Cruz	Ford Raptor DKR	Ford M-Sport	T1.+
226	(Sweden) Mattias Ekström	(Sweden) Emil Bergkvist	Ford Raptor DKR	Ford M-Sport	T1.+
227	(Spain) Nani Roma	(Spain) Alex Haro	Ford Raptor DKR	Ford M-Sport	T1.+
228	(United States) Mitch Guthrie	(United States) Kellon Walch	Ford Raptor DKR	Ford M-Sport	T1.+
229	(Spain) Isidre Esteve	(Spain) Jose Maria Villalobos	Toyota Hilux	Repsol Toyota Rally Team	T1.+
230	(Brazil) Marcelo Tiglia Gastaldi	(France) Adrien Metge	Century CR7	Century Racing	T1.+
231	(Australia) Toby Price	(United Kingdom) Sam Sunderland	Toyota Hilux Overdrive	Overdrive Racing	T1.+
233	(France) Simon Vitse	(France) Max Delfino	MD Optimus	MD Rallye Sport	T1.2
234	(Seychelles) Aliyyah Koloc	(France) Sebastien Delaunay	Red-lined Revo+	Buggyra Zm Racing	T1.+
235	(Estonia) Urvo Männama	(Estonia) Risto Lepik	Toyota Hilux Overdrive	Overdrive Racing	T1.+
236	(Italy) Eugenio Amos	(Italy) Paolo Ceci	MD Optimus	MD Rallye Sport	T1.2
237	(Netherlands) Tim Coronel	(Netherlands) Tom Coronel	Century CR7	Coronel Dakar Team	T1.+
238	(Lithuania) Gintas Petrus	(Lithuania) Darius Leskauskas	MD Optimus	Petrus Racing Team	T1.2
239	(South Africa) Mark Corbett	(South Africa) Juan Möhr	Century CR6-T	Century Racing Factory Team	T1.2
240	(Portugal) João Ferreira	(Portugal) Filipe Palmeiro	Mini JCW Rally 3.0d	X-raid Mini JCW Team	T1.+
241	(Lithuania) Vladas Jurkevičius	(Lithuania) Aisvydas Paliukėnas	Mini JCW Rally 3.0i	X-raid Mini JCW Team	T1.+
242	(Germany) Daniel Schröder	(South Africa) Henry Carl Köhne	Volkswagen Wct Amarok	Ps Laser Racing	T1.+
243	(France) Pascal Thomasse	(France) Arnold Brucy	MD Optimus	MD Rallye Sport	T1.2
244	(Netherlands) Maik Willems	(Netherlands) Marcel Snijders	Toyota Hilux	Bastion Hotels Dakar Team	T1.+
245	(Belgium) Stefan Carmans	(Netherlands) Antonius van Tiel	Red-lined Revo+	Csa Racing	T1.+
246	(France) Jean Remy Bergounhe	(France) Pascal Larroque	MD Optimus	MD Rallye Sport	T1.2
247	(China) Po Tian	(China) Hangting Guo	Red-lined Revo T1+	Hanwei Motorsport Team	T1.+
248	(Brazil) Marcos Moraes	(Brazil) Maykel Justo	Toyota Hilux Overdrive	Overdrive Racing	T1.+
249	(Czech Republic) Karel Trneny	(Czech Republic) Vaclav Pritzl	Ford 150 Evo	X-force Accr Czech Team	T1.+
251	(China) Rong Zi	(China) Hongyu Pan	Toyota Hilux	Mintimes Yunxiang Rally Team	T1.+
252	(France) Jerome Cambier	(France) Pascal Delacour	MD Optimus	MD Rallye Sport	T1.2
253	(France) Hugues Moilet	(Belgium) Olivier Imschoot	MD Optimus	Off Road Concept	T1.2
254	(Zimbabwe) William Battershill	(South Africa) Stuart Gregory	Century CR6	Century Racing	T1.2
257	(Spain) Ferran Jubany	(Spain) Marc Sola	MD Optimus	MD Rallye Sport	T1.2
258	(Germany) Markus Walcher	(Germany) Frank Stephan Preuss	Red-lined Navarra VK56	Walcher Racing Team	T1.1
260	(Italy) Agostino Rizzardi	(Italy) Francesca Gasperi	Century CR6	Motortecnica Racing Team	T1.2
261	(France) Francis Balocchi	(France) Anthony Pes	MD Optimus	MD Rallye Sport	T1.2
262	(Netherlands) Dave Klaassen	(Netherlands) Tessa Klaassen	Red-lined Revo T1+	Daklapack Rallysport	T1.+
263	(France) Ludovic Gherardi	(France) Lionel Costes	MD Optimus	MD Rallye Sport	T1.2
264	(Netherlands) Rik Van Den Brink	(Netherlands) Gydo Heimans	Century CR7	Srt	T1.+
265	(Netherlands) Ronald Van Loon	(Netherlands) Erik Lemmen	Red-lined Revo T1+	Oase Motorsport	T1.+
266	(China) Min Lei Wang	(China) Du Xuanyi	Century CR7	Mingyuan Industrial Racing	T1.+
267	(Belarus) Andrei Halabarodzka	(Kazakhstan) Alexey Mun	Toyota Hilux	Magol Dakar Team	T1.1
278	(France) Pierre Lachaume	(France) Christophe Crespo	MD Optimus	MD Rallye Sport	T1.2
500	(Japan) Akira Miura	(France) Jean Michel Polato	Toyota Land Cruiser GR Sport	Team Land Cruiser Toyota Auto Body	T2.1
501	(France) Ronald Basso	(France) Jean-Pierre Garcin	Toyota Land Cruiser GR Sport	Team Land Cruiser Toyota Auto Body	T2.1

Entry list – Challenger (T3)

Note
– The "Dakar Legends" – competitors that participated in 10 or more Dakar events.
– The first time starters – "rookies".
– Competitors that were not able to start the race.

No.	Driver	Co-driver	Vehicle	Team	Class
300	(Saudi Arabia) Yasir Seaidan	(France) Michael Metge	Taurus T3 Max	Team BBR	T3.1
301	(Argentina) Nicolás Cavigliasso	(Argentina) Valentina Pertegarini	Taurus T3 Max	Team BBR	T3.1
302	(Netherlands) Puck Klaassen	(South Africa) Charan Moore	GRallyTeam OT3	G Rally Team	T3.1
304	(Spain) Pau Navarro	(Argentina) Lisandro Ezequiel Sisterna Herrera	Taurus T3 Max	Team BBR	T3.1
305	(Saudi Arabia) Dania Akeel	(France) Stephane Duple	Taurus T3 Max	Team BBR	T3.1
306	(Saudi Arabia) Saleh Alsaif	(Lithuania) Albert Veliamovič	GRallyTeam OT3	Dark Horse	T3.1
307	(Portugal) Mario Carlos Leonardo Franco	(Portugal) Rui Franco	X-raid YXZ 1000R	Francosport	T3.1
308	(Argentina) David Zille	(Argentina) Sebastian Cesana	Taurus T3 Max	Daklapack Rallysport – Zille Rally	T3.1
309	(Spain) Eduardo Pons Sune	(Spain) Jaume Betriu	Taurus T3 Max	Nasser Racing	T3.1
310	(Netherlands) Paul Spierings	(Netherlands) Jan Pieter Van Der Stelt	Taurus REBELLION&SPIERINGS T3	Team Rebellion & Spierings	T3.1
311	(France) Christophe Cresp	(France) Jean Brucy	MMP Rally Raid	MMP	T3.1
312	(Spain) Oscar Ral	(Spain) Xavier Blanco Garcia	Taurus T3 Max	Buggy Masters Team	T3.1
313	(United Arab Emirates) Khalid Aljafla	Andrei Rudnitski	Taurus T3 Max	Aljafla Racing	T3.1
314	(Spain) Xavier Foj	(Argentina) Facundo Jaton	ORYX T3	Foj Motorsport	T3.1
315	(Germany) Annett Quandt	(Sweden) Annie Seel	X-raid 1000R TURBO	X-raid Team	T3.1
316	(Netherlands) Gert-jan Van Der Valk	(Netherlands) Branco De Lange	Arcane T3	Arcane Racing	T3.1
317	(France) Benjamin Lattard	(France) Patrick Jimbert	MMP Rally Raid	MMP	T3.1
318	(Portugal) Pedro Gonçalves	(Portugal) Hugo Magalhaes	X-raid YXZ1000R	Franco Sport	T3.1
319	(Portugal) Gonçalo Guerreiro	(Brazil) Cadu Sachs	Taurus T3 Max	Red Bull Off-road Jr Team USA by BFG	T3.1
320	(Portugal) Luis Portela Morais	(Portugal) David Megre	GRallyTeam OT3	G Rally Team	T3.1
321	(Portugal) Rui Carneiro	(Norway) Ola Floene	GRallyTeam OT3	G Rally Team	T3.1
322	(Portugal) Ricardo Porem	(Portugal) Nuno Sousa	MMP Rally Raid	MMP	T3.1
323	(Colombia) Javier Velez Gonzalez	(Argentina) Gaston Ariel Mattarucco	Can-Am Maverick X3	Adt Motowear – Drink Persé	T3.1
324	(France) Alexandre Giroud	(France) Jeremy Jacomelli	GRallyTeam OT3	Team Giroud – G Rally Team	T3.1
325	(United States) Corbin Leaverton	(Germany) Taye Perry	Taurus T3 Max	Red Bull Off-road Jr Team USA by BFG	T3.1
326	(Qatar) Khalifa Al Attiyah	(Argentina) Bruno Jacomy	Taurus T3 Max	Nasser Racing	T3.1
327	(France) Antoine Meo	(France) Guilhem Alves	Apache APH-03	Apache Automotive	T3.U
328	(Poland) Piotr Beaupre	(Poland) Jacek Czachor	Can-Am Maverick	Zoll Racing	T3.1
330	(Qatar) Ahmed F. Alkuwari	(Argentina) Augusto Sanz	Taurus T3 Max	Nasser Racing	T3.1
331	(France) Romain Locmane	(France) Benjamin Boulloud	Can-Am Maverick	Xrs Quad Bike Evasion	T3.1
332	(United States) Zachary Lumsden	(United States) Shannon Moham	Can-Am Maverick X3	Colorado Motorsport	T3.1
333	(United Kingdom) William Buller	(Italy) Camelia Liparoti	GRallyTeam OT3	C.A.T Racing	T3.1
334	(Qatar) Abdulaziz Al-Kuwari	(Qatar) Nasser Al-Kuwari	Taurus T3 Max	Nasser Racing	T3.1
335	(United Kingdom) Richard Aczel	(Netherlands) Wouter Rosegaar	Arcane T3	Arcane Racing	T3.1
336	(United States) Lawrence Janesky	TBC	Can-Am Maverick X3	South Racing Can-am	T3.1
337	(United States) Craig Lumsden	(United States) Jamie Lambert	Can-Am Maverick X3	Colorado Motorsport	T3.1
338	(Saudi Arabia) Hamad Nasser Alharbi	(United Arab Emirates) Aleksei Kuzmich	Can-Am Maverick X3	Shegawi Racing	T3.1
340	(Portugal) Maria Gameiro	(Portugal) José Marques	X-raid 1000R TURBO	X-raid Team	T3.1
341	(Saudi Arabia) Abdullah Alhaydan	TBC	Taurus T3 Max	Abdullah Alhaydan	T3.1
342	(France) Aurélien Bouchet	(France) Elisa Huguenin	PH-SPORT Zephyr Phase 2	Abconcept / Btr	T3.1
343	(France) Hervé Guillaume	(France) Maxime Guillaume	PH-SPORT Zephyr Phase 2	Les Enfants Du Dakar – Btr	T3.1
345	(France) Benjamin Favre	(France) Thibaud Darroux	MMP Rally Raid	MMP	T3.1
346	(France) Jedidia Favre	(France) Antoine Lecourbe	MMP Rally Raid	MMP	T3.1
347	(France) Loïc Frebourg	(France) Franck Boulay	Can-Am Maverick	Xrs Quad Bike Evasion Cognac	T3.1
348	(France) Yannick Grezes	(France) Anthony Drapeau	Can-Am XRS TURBO	Team Bournezeau Rallye Aventure	T3.1
349	(Poland) Adam Kus	(Ukraine) Dmytro Tsyro	Taurus T3 Max	Akpol Recykling	T3.1
350	(Spain) Oscar Maso	(Spain) Pedro Lopez Chaves	Demon Car DT3	Be Racing	T3.1
351	(Switzerland) Alexandre Pesci	(Switzerland) Stephan Kuhni	Taurus REBELLION&SPIERINGS T3	Team Rebellion & Spierings	T3.1
352	(Spain) Oscar Olivas	(Spain) Luis Barrios	Can-Am Maverick X3	Bujarkay-makarthy Racing	T3.1
353	(Netherlands) Lex Peters	(Netherlands) Mark Salomons	Arcane T3	Arcane Racing	T3.1
354	(Spain) Juan Piferrer	(Spain) Joan Rubi	Can-Am Maverick X3	Buggy Masters Team	T3.1
355	(Italy) Gianpaolo Bedin	(Italy) Alberto Marcon	Raitec RT3B	Raitec Racing	T3.1
356	(Netherlands) Riné Streppel	(Netherlands) Lisette Bakker	Arcane T3	Arcane Racing	T3.1
357	(Poland) Lukasz Zoll	(Poland) Michal Zoll	Can-Am Maverick	Zoll Racing	T3.1
358	(Spain) Joan Font	(Spain) Sergi Brugue	Can-Am Maverick X3	Team Boucou	T3.1

Entry list – SSV (T4)

Note
– The "Dakar Legends" – competitors that participated in 10 or more Dakar events.
– The first time starters – "rookies".
– Competitors that were not able to start the race.

No.	Driver	Co-driver	Vehicle	Team	Class
400	(France) Xavier De Soultrait	(France) Martin Bonnet	Polaris RZR PRO R Sport	Sebastien Loeb Racing – RZR Factory Racing	T4
401	(Ecuador) Sebastian Guayasamin	(Argentina) Fernando Acosta	BRP Can-Am Maverick XRS Turbo RR	Be Racing	T4
402	(Spain) Gerard Farrés	(Spain) Toni Vingut	BRP Can-Am Maverick XRS Turbo RR	Pedregà Team	T4
403	(Switzerland) Jérôme de Sadeleer	(Spain) Diego Ortega	BRP Can-Am Maverick XRS Turbo RR	MMP	T4
404	(Chile) Francisco López Contardo	(Chile) Juan Pablo Latrach	BRP Can-Am Maverick R	Can-Am Factory Team	SSV1
405	(United States) Sara Price	(United States) Sean Berriman	BRP Can-Am Maverick R	Can-Am Factory Team	SSV1
406	(Italy) Enrico Gaspari	(Spain) Fausto Mota	Polaris RZR PRO R Sport	TH-Trucks Team	T4
407	(Argentina) Jeremias Gonzalez Ferioli	(Argentina) Pedro Gonzalo Rinaldi	BRP Can-Am Maverick R	Can-Am Factory Team	SSV1
408	(Argentina) Diego Martinez	(Uruguay) Sergio Lafuente	BRP Can-Am Maverick R	South Racing Can-Am	SSV1
409	(Spain) Fernando Alvarez	(France) Xavier Panseri	BRP Can-Am Maverick R	South Racing Can-Am	SSV1
410	(France) Claude Fournier	(France) Gregory Revest-Arnoux	BRP Can-Am Maverick XRS Turbo RR	MMP	T4
411	(France) Florent Vayssade	(France) Nicolas Rey	Polaris RZR PRO R Sport	Sebastien Loeb Racing – RZR Factory Racing	T4
412	(Portugal) Alexandre Pinto	(Portugal) Bernardo Oliveira	BRP Can-Am Maverick XRS Turbo RR	Old Friends Rally Team	T4
413	(Argentina) Manuel Andujar	(Argentina) Bernardo Graue	BRP Can-Am Maverick R	South Racing Can-Am	SSV1
414	(Italy) Michele Antonio Cinotto	(Italy) Alberto Bertoldi	Polaris RZR PRO R Sport	Cst Xtreme Plus Polaris Team	T4
415	(Spain) Fidel Castillo	(Argentina) Anuar Osman	BRP Can-Am Maverick XRS Turbo RR	Bujarkay-makarthy Racing	T4
416	(Poland) Grzegorz Brochocki	(Poland) Grzegorz Komar	BRP Can-Am Maverick XRS Turbo RR	Overlimit	T4
418	(Portugal) Joao Monteiro	(Portugal) Nuno Morais	BRP Can-Am Maverick R	South Racing Can-Am	SSV1
419	(Japan) Shinsuke Umeda	(France) Paul Durame	Polaris RZR PRO R Sport	Cst Xtreme Plus Polaris	T4
420	(United States) Hunter Miller	(United States) Andrew Short	BRP Can-Am Maverick R	Can-Am Factory Team	SSV1
422	(France) Eric Croquelois	(France) Bruno Raymond	BRP Can-Am Maverick XRS Turbo RR	Dragon	T4
423	(France) Philippe Boutron	(France) Mayeul Barbet	BRP Can-Am Maverick R	BTR	SSV1
424	(Portugal) Joao Dias	(Portugal) Goncalo Reis	BRP Can-Am Maverick XRS Turbo RR	Santag Racing	T4
425	(United States) Brock Heger	(United States) Max Eddy	Polaris RZR PRO R Sport	Sebastien Loeb Racing – RZR Factory Racing	T4
426	(Spain) Carlos Vento	(Portugal) Jorge Brandao	BRP Can-Am Maverick XRS Turbo RR	Old Friends Rally Team	T4
427	(France) Benoit Lepietre	(France) Rodrigue Relmy-Madinska	BRP Can-Am Maverick R	BTR	SSV1
428	(Netherlands) Sander Derikx	(Netherlands) Marnix Leeuw	BRP Can-Am Maverick XRS Turbo RR	Timola Rallysport	T4
429	(Saudi Arabia) Ibrahim N. Al Muhna	(Saudi Arabia) Faisal Alsuwayh	BRP Can-Am Maverick XRS Turbo RR	Almuhanna Racers	T4
430	(Netherlands) Roger Grouwels	(Netherlands) Rudolf Meijer	BRP Can-Am Maverick XRS Turbo RR	Raceart	T4
431	(Italy) Pietro Cinotto	(Italy) Martino Albertini	Polaris RZR PRO R Sport	Cst Xtreme Plus Polaris Team	T4
432	(Spain) Jose Vidanya	(Spain) Mario Garrido	BRP Can-Am Maverick XRS Turbo RR	Pedregà Team	T4
433	(France) Olivier Pernaut	(France) Benjamin Riviere	BRP Can-Am Maverick R	Orhes Racing	SSV1
434	(Spain) Domingo Roman	(Spain) Oscar Bravo	Polaris RZR PRO R Sport	TH-Trucks Team	T4
435	(Spain) Jose Ignacio Gayoso	(Spain) Santiago Ramiro	Polaris RZR PRO R Sport	TH-Trucks Team	T4
436	(Saudi Arabia) Moaz Hariri	TBC	BRP Can-Am Maverick XRS Turbo RR	Dark Horse	T4
437	(Morocco) Souad Mouktadiri	(France) Vincent Ferri	BRP Can-Am Maverick XRS Turbo RR	Mouktadiri Racing Team	T4
438	(Italy) Stefano Marrini	(Italy) Matteo Lardori	BRP Can-Am Maverick XRS Turbo RR	R Team	T4
439	(Spain) Rafael Muñoz	(Spain) Daniel Cámara	BRP Can-Am Maverick XRS Turbo RR	Pedregà Team	T4
442	(France) Gregory Lefort	(France) George Da Cruz	BRP Can-Am Maverick R	Pôle Position 77 / BTR	SSV1
444	(Bahrain) Hasan Alsadadi	(Poland) Marcin Pasek	BRP Can-Am Maverick XRS Turbo RR	R-X Sport	T4

Entry list – Trucks

Note
– The "Dakar Legends" – competitors that participated in 10 or more Dakar events.
– The first time starters – "rookies".
– Competitors that were not able to start the race.

No.	Driver	Co-driver	Technician	Vehicle	Team	Class
600	(Czech Republic) Martin Macík	(Czech Republic) František Tomášek (co-driver)	(Czech Republic) David Svanda	Iveco PowerStar	MM Technology	T5.1
601	(Czech Republic) Aleš Loprais	(Poland) Darek Rodewald	(Czech Republic) David Kripal	Iveco PowerStar	Instatrade Loprais Team De Rooy Fpt	T5.1
602	(Netherlands) Mitchel Van Den Brink	(Netherlands) Antonio Jarno Van De Pol	(Spain) Moises Torrallardona	Iveco PowerStar	Eurol Rally Sport	T5.1
603	(Netherlands) Kees Koolen	(Netherlands) Wouter De Graaff	(Czech Republic) Daniel Kozlowsky	Iveco PowerStar	MM Technology	T5.1
604	(Czech Republic) Martin Soltys	(Czech Republic) Vlastimil Miksch	(Czech Republic) Tomáš Šikola	Tatra Buggyra EVO3	Tatra Buggyra Zm Racing	T5.1
605	(Lithuania) Vaidotas Žala	(Portugal) Paulo Fiuza	(Netherlands) Max Van Grol	Iveco PowerStar	Skuba Team De Rooy Fpt	T5.1
606	(Netherlands) Martin van den Brink	(Netherlands) Richard Mouw	(Netherlands) Bart Van Heun	Iveco PowerStar	Eurol Rally Sport	T5.1
607	(Japan) Teruhito Sugawara	(Japan) Hirokazu Somemiya	(Japan) Yuji Mochizuki	Hino 600	Hino Team Sugawara	T5.1
608	(Italy) Claudio Bellina	(Italy) Marco Arnoletti	(Italy) Danilo Petrucci	Iveco PowerStar	MM Technology	T5.1
609	(Netherlands) Ben De Groot	(Netherlands) Ad Hofmans	(Netherlands) Govert Boogard	Iveco PowerStar	De Groot Sport	T5.1
610	(Netherlands) Richard De Groot	(Netherlands) Johannes Hulsebosch	(Belgium) Jan Van Der Vaet	Iveco PowerStar	Firemen Dakar Team	T5.1
611	(Czech Republic) Tomáš Vrátný	(Poland) Bartlomiej Boba	(Czech Republic) Jaromir Martinec	Tatra FF7	Fesh Fesh Team	T5.1
613	(Netherlands) Anja Van Loon	(Netherlands) Ben Van De Laar	(Netherlands) Jan Van De Laar	Iveco PowerStar	Fried Van De Laar Racing Team De Rooy Fpt	T5.1
615	(Netherlands) Maurik Van Den Heuvel	(Netherlands) Wilko Van Oort	(Netherlands) Martijn Van Rooij	Scania Lonestar	Dakarspeed	T5.1
616	(Netherlands) William De Groot	(Netherlands) Koen Hendriks	(Netherlands) Remon Van Der Steen	Iveco PowerStar	De Groot Sport	T5.1
617	(Hungary) Miklos Kovacs	(Hungary) Peter Czegledi	(Hungary) Acs Laszlo	Scania Qualisport	Hyena Qualisport Kft	T5.1
618	(Spain) Jose Manuel Sabate	(Spain) Pol Tibau Roura	(United Kingdom) Nicholas Jones	MAN TGA	The Dacia Sandriders	T5.1
619	(Italy) Paolo Calabria	(Italy) Giuseppe Fortuna	(Italy) Loris Calubini	MAN TGA	Eagle Racing Team	T5.1
620	(Spain) Alejandro Aguirregaviria	(Spain) Francesc Salisi	(Spain) Marc Torres	Iveco PowerStar	Tibau Team	T5.1
621	(Czech Republic) Karel Posledni	(Czech Republic) Lukas Kvasnica	(Czech Republic) Filip Škrobánek	Tatra Phoenix	Tatra Buggyra Zm Racing	T5.1
623	(France) Alexandre Lemeray	(France) Marion Andrieu	(France) Fabien Lecaplain	DAF XF	Team NRS	T5.1
625	(Spain) Alberto Herrero	(Spain) Mario Rodriguez	(Spain) Pedro Peñate	Scania 4X4	TH-trucks Team	T5.1
626	(Saudi Arabia) Tariq Al-Rammah	(Algeria) Samir Benbekhti	(France) Serge Lambert	Volvo FMX	Sta Competition	T5.2
627	(Germany) Michael Baumann	(Germany) Philipp Beier	(Germany) Jens Scholer	MAN TGA	X-raid Team	T5.2
628	(Belgium) Tom Geuens	(France) Samuel Koopmann	(France) Anthony Robineau	Iveco Trakker	Overdrive Racing	T5.2
629	(Belgium) Didier Monseu	(Belgium) Charly Gotlib	(Belgium) Edouard Fraipont	MAN TGA	The Dacia Sandriders	T5.2
630	(France) Jean-Francois Cazeres	(France) Jerome Detouillon	(France) Nicolas Falloux	Iveco Trakker	Team Boucou Competition	T5.2
631	(Hungary) Zsolt Darázsi	(France) Pierre Calmon	(Slovakia) Palco Lubomir	MAN TGA	Team SSP	T5.2
632	(France) Philippe Perry	(Spain) Adria Guillem Gallardo	(France) Florent Drulhon	DAF 4X4	Team Boucou Competition	T5.2
633	(Italy) Giulio Verzeletti	(Italy) Antonio Cabini	(Italy) Carlo Cabini	Iveco PowerStar	Orobica Raid	T5.1
634	(Spain) Jordi Esteve Oro	(Spain) Francesc Pardo	(Spain) Jordi Pujol Forns	MAN TGS	Tibau Team	T5.2
636	(Italy) Cesare G. Rickler del Mare	(Italy) Aldo De Lorenzo	(Spain) Juan Francisco Silva	MAN TGS	TH-trucks Team	T5.2
637	(France) Antoine Vitse	(France) Alain Coquelle	(France) Benoit Liefooghe	Scania Torpedo	Solurent Racing	T5.2
638	(Czech Republic) Dusan Randysek	(France) Laurent Lalanne	(France) Victor Bouchwalder	MAN TGA	Team SSP	T5.2
639	(France) Frederic Baché	TBC	TBC	MAN TGA	Team Boucou Competition	T5.2
640	(Spain) Alberto Alonso	(Spain) Gustavo Ibeas	(Spain) Alejandro Mozuelos	MAN TGA	TH-trucks Team	T5.2
641	(Czech Republic) Tomáš Tomeček	(Netherlands) Ard Munster	(Italy) Niccolo Funaioli	Tatra 815-2T0R45	South Racing Can-am	T5.2
643	(France) Sylvain Besnard	(France) Patrick Prot	(France) Sylvain Laliche	MAN TGA	Ric Rallye	T5.2
644	(United Kingdom) John Cockburn	(France) Louis Lauilhe	(France) Benoit Bonnefoi	MAN TGS	STA Competition	T5.2
645	(Hungary) Norbert Szalai	(France) Fabien Catherine	(Hungary) Robert Tagai	MAN TGS	Team SSP	T5.2
646	(Spain) Javier Jacoste	(Spain) Francisco Ester	(Spain) Gerard Ribas	MAN TGA	Jalanmarrones	T5.2
647	(Saudi Arabia) Bader Albarrak	(Italy) David Giovannetti	(France) Paco Fernandez	Mercedes Unimog	Cst Xtreme Plus Polaris Team	T5.2
648	(France) Sebastien Fargeas	(France) Marc Dardaillon	(France) Bruno Basire	MAN TGA	Team Boucou Competition	T5.2
649	(France) Jeremie Gimbre	(France) Richard Gonzalez	(France) Franck Maldonado	DAF CF 85	Sodicars Racing	T5.2
651	(France) Ahmed Benbekhti	(France) Mickael Fauvel	(France) Bruno Seillet	MAN TGA	Team Rebellion & Spierings	T5.2

Entry list – Classics

Note
– The "Dakar Legends" – competitors that participated in 10 or more Dakar events.
– The first time starters – "rookies".
– Competitors that were not able to start the race.

No.	Driver	Co-driver	Technician	Vehicle	Team	Class
700	(Spain) Carlos Santaolalla Milla	(Spain) Jan Rosa I Viñas	No technician	Toyota HDJ 80	Factorytub	86–98 Moderate Average
701	(Italy) Lorenzo Traglio	(Italy) Rudy Briani	No technician	Nissan Terrano Pick-up	Tecnosport	86–98 Low Average
702	(Spain) Juan Morera	(Spain) Lidia Ruba	No technician	Porsche 959 Dakar	Momabikes Raid Team	86–98 Moderate Average
703	(Belgium) Dirk Van Rompuy	(Belgium) Christiaan Michel Goris	No technician	Toyota HDJ 80	TH-Trucks Team	86–98 Moderate Average
704	(France) Maxence Gublin	(France) Anthony Sousa	No technician	Land Rover Defender 110	Bolides Racing	86–98 Low Average
705	(Netherlands) Erik Van Loon	(Netherlands) Hein Verschuuren	No technician	Audi Quattro	Dutch Quattro Legends	86–98 High Average
706	(France) Axel Berrier	(France) Jérémy Athimon	No technician	Porsche 964 Dkr	Team Ssp	86–98 Moderate Average
707	(Italy) Maurizio Traglio	(Italy) Francesco Maria Proietti	No technician	Nissan Terrano II R20	Tecnosport	+99 Intermediate Average
708	(Spain) Francisco Javier Benavente	(Spain) Rafael Benavente Del Rio	No technician	Nissan Patrol	Recinsa Sport	86–98 Moderate Average
709	(Spain) Asier Duarte Rodriguez	(Spain) Luis Barbero Garcia	No technician	Toyota HDJ 80	TH-Trucks Team	86–98 Moderate Average
710	(Germany) Jörg Sand	(Germany) Patrick Diemer	No technician	Mercedes G	Rallyeraid-Club-Germany	−86 Low Average
711	(France) Lionel Guy	(France) Laurent Milbergue	No technician	Land Rover Range Rover Classic	Team Gva2025	−86 Moderate Average
712	(Czech Republic) Barbora Holicka	(Czech Republic) Lucie Engova	No technician	Citroën 2CV	Duckar Team	−86 Low Average
713	(Netherlands) Hans Stacey	(Netherlands) Anton van Limpt	No technician	Audi Quattro	Dutch Quattro Legends	86–98 High Average
714	(Croatia) Juraj Šebalj	(Croatia) Sinisa Crnojevic	No technician	Toyota BJ71	Cro Dakar Classic Team	86–98 Moderate Average
715	(Italy) Renato Rickler Del Mare	(Italy) Massimo Gabbrielleschi	No technician	Mitsubishi Pajero	R Team	86–98 Moderate Average
716	(Switzerland) Mathieu Kurzen	(Switzerland) Alexandre Fatio	No technician	Nissan Terrano	Geco Classic	86–98 Moderate Average
717	(Netherlands) Frits van Eerd	(Netherlands) Patric Brinkman	No technician	Audi Quattro	Dutch Quattro Legends	86–98 High Average
718	(France) Dominique Durand	(France) Eric Soldani	No technician	Toyota HDJ 80	Team Ssp	86–98 Moderate Average
720	(Italy) Gian Paolo Tobia Cavagna	(Italy) Gianni Pelizzola	No technician	Nissan Patrol	Team Tecnosport Geca	+99 Intermediate Average
721	(Italy) Ernst Amort	(Germany) Adolf Ruhaltinger	No technician	Peugeot 504 Coupé	Montana Racing	−86 Moderate Average
722	(India) Sanjay Takale	(France) Maxime Raud	No technician	Toyota HZJ 78	Compagnie Saharienne	86–98 Low Average
723	(France) Herve Solandt	(France) Paul Puchouau	No technician	Land Rover Range Rover Classic	Team Boucou	86–98 Low Average
724	(Netherlands) Floris De Raadt	(Netherlands) David Kann	No technician	Citroën 2CV	2chameaux	−86 Low Average
725	(France) Ludovic Failly	(France) Franck Poirot	No technician	Peugeot P4	Ecurie Freres D'armes	86–98 Low Average
726	(Austria) Peter Brabeck-Letmathe	(France) Jean-Michel Gayte	No technician	Mitsubishi Pajero	Team Casteu Classic	86–98 Moderate Average
727	(Austria) Andres Brabeck-Letmathe	(Switzerland) Nicolas Brabeck-Letmathe	No technician	Mitsubishi Pajero	Team Casteu Classic	−86 Moderate Average
729	(Netherlands) Peter Van Den Bosch	(United States) Hans Brand	No technician	Audi Quattro	Dutch Quattro Legends	86–98 High Average
730	(France) Patrice Auzet	(France) Francois Xavier Bourgois	No technician	Renault R30 TX	Team Boucou	−86 Moderate Average
731	(Italy) Josef Unterholzner	(Italy) Franco Gaioni	No technician	Mitsubishi Pajero	R Team	86–98 Moderate Average
732	(United States) Cameron Moore	(Italy) Maurizio Dominella	No technician	Nissan Patrol GR	Tecnosport	+99 Intermediate Average
733	(Italy) Guido Dallarosa	(Italy) Maria Vittoria Dalla Rosa Prati	No technician	Nissan Patrol	Motortecnica Racing Team	+99 Intermediate Average
734	(France) Frédéric Fatien	(France) Jean-Luc Roinet	No technician	Toyota HZJ 78	Compagnie Saharienne	86–98 Low Average
735	(Italy) Luciano Carcheri	(Italy) Fabrizia Pons	No technician	Isuzu VehiCROSS	Carcheri Luciano	86–98 Moderate Average
736	(France) Christine Bernard	(United States) Bruno Delagneau	No technician	Toyota HDJ 80	Team Ssp	86–98 Moderate Average
738	(Italy) Antonio Ricciari	(Italy) Simona Morosi	No technician	Mitsubishi Pajero	R Team	86–98 Moderate Average
739	(France) Christophe Berteloot	(France) Stéphanie Wante	No technician	Toyota HDJ 80	Team Pevéle Aventure	86–98 Moderate Average
741	(France) Jean-Luc Martineau	(France) Sebastien Dubois	No technician	Toyota HDJ 80	Team Ssp	86–98 Moderate Average
742	(United States) Taz Evin Harvey	(United States) Michael Joseph Krynock	No technician	Nissan Terrano	Tecnosport	86–98 Moderate Average
743	(Czech Republic) Ondrej Martinec	(Czech Republic) Jiri Kopriva	No technician	Toyota Land Cruiser 90	Czech Samurais	86–98 Moderate Average
744	(Spain) Luis Pedrals Marot	(Spain) Sergi Giralt Valero	No technician	Mercedes G	TH-Trucks Team	86–98 Moderate Average
745	(Argentina) Jorge Perez Companc	(Argentina) Cristobal Perez Companc	No technician	Toyota HDJ 80	TH-Trucks Team	86–98 Moderate Average
746	(Italy) Ugo Bullesi	(Italy) Myriam Manzoni	No technician	Mitsubishi Pajero	Bullesi	86–98 Moderate Average
747	(Spain) Amadeo Roige Bragulat	(Spain) Jorge Toral	No technician	Toyota KZJ95	Pedrega Team	86–98 Moderate Average
749	(Italy) Damiano Lipani	(Italy) Stefano Crementieri	No technician	Mitsubishi Pajero Evolution	R Team	+99 Intermediate Average
751	(Italy) Henry Favre	(Italy) Alessandro Iacovelli	No technician	Mitsubishi Pajero	R Team	86–98 Low Average
752	(Czech Republic) Jan Barta	(Czech Republic) Petr Svec	No technician	Mitsubishi Pajero	Enjoy Motorsport	86–98 Moderate Average
753	(Poland) Tomasz Staniszewski	(Poland) Stanislaw Postawka	No technician	Porsche 924	Nrf Dext P-rally Team	−86 Low Average
755	(Czech Republic) Jan Vins	(Czech Republic) Filip Bajora	No technician	Mitsubishi Pajero	Enjoy Motorsport	86–98 Moderate Average
756	(France) Christophe Deage	(France) Louis Deage	No technician	Toyota HDJ 100	Team Deage Racing	+99 Intermediate Average
757	(Italy) Luigi Bianchi	(Italy) Gianluca Sbaraglia	No technician	Mitsubishi Pajero Evolution	R Team	+99 Intermediate Average
758	(France) Jean-Pierre Valentini	(Belgium) Francois Beguin	No technician	Toyota HZJ 78	Compagnie Saharienne	86–98 Low Average
759	(France) Patrick Doby	(France) Clement Doby	No technician	Toyota HDJ 80	Team Pevéle Aventure	86–98 Moderate Average
760	(France) Ludovic Bois	(United Kingdom) Julia Colman	No technician	Mitsubishi Pajero Evolution	Ludovic Bois	+99 Intermediate Average
761	(Spain) Matias Rodriguez Martin	(Spain) Sandra Guasch Planells	No technician	Mitsubishi L200	Pedrega Team	86–98 Moderate Average
762	(France) Denis Fercoq	(France) Jean-Marc Locqueneaux	No technician	Peugeot 205 D	Passion-aventure	86–98 Moderate Average
763	(Italy) Francesco Pece	(Italy) Monica Buonamano	No technician	Nissan Terrano	Tecnosport	86–98 Moderate Average
764	(France) Valentin Simonet	(France) Mathieu Monplaisi	No technician	Toyota HDJ 100	Compagnie Saharienne	+99 Intermediate Average
765	(France) Tenessy Grezes	(France) Lucas Longepe	No technician	Toyota HDJ 80	Bournezeau Rallye Aventures	86–98 Moderate Average
766	(Italy) Eufrasio Anghileri	(Italy) Antonio Anghileri	No technician	Nissan Patrol	Motortecnica Racing Team	+99 Intermediate Average
767	(Italy) Filippo Giorgio Colnaghi	(Italy) Daniele Bottallo	No technician	Nissan Patrol	Tecnosport	86–98 Moderate Average
768	(South Africa) Jordan Grogor	(Germany) Wesley Grogor	No technician	Toyota HZJ 78	Compagnie Saharienne	86–98 Low Average
769	(Italy) Marco Ernesto Leva	(Italy) Alexia Giugni	No technician	Mitsubishi Pajero	R Team	86–98 Low Average
770	(France) Julien Bessé	(France) Franck Corbeau	No technician	Mitsubishi Pajero	Extrem Rallye Aventures	86–98 Moderate Average
771	(Switzerland) Cedric Zolliker	(Germany) Clemens Lansing	No technician	Toyota HDJ 80	Zolliker-lansing Cédric	86–98 Moderate Average
772	(Germany) Frank Uwe Juergen Thiel	(Germany) Frieder Schuppert	No technician	Nissan Terrano Prototype	Montana Racing	+99 Intermediate Average
773	(France) Christophe Chabeuf	(France) Didier Fraisse	No technician	Toyota HZJ 75	Team Ssp	86–98 Moderate Average
774	(Lithuania) Karolis Raišys	(Lithuania) Ignas Daunoravičius	No technician	Land Rover Series III	Karolis Raišys	−86 Low Average
775	(Italy) Luciano Montorfano	(Italy) Elena Borroni	No technician	Nissan Terrano	Tecnosport	+99 Intermediate Average
776	(Australia) Peter Schey	(Australia) Christopher Schey	No technician	Nissan Terrano	Aspen Pumps / Works Rally-raid	86–98 Moderate Average
777	(Spain) Lorenzo Fluxa Domene	(Spain) Xavi Ribas Font	No technician	Toyota Land Cruiser	Ljs Racing Team	86–98 Low Average
778	(France) David Cupers	(France) Corinne Cupers	No technician	Toyota HDJ 80	Team Pevéle Aventure	86–98 Moderate Average
779	(Hungary) Péter Hamza	(Austria) Andras Kalmar	No technician	Mitsubishi Pajero	Tireman Racing Team	86–98 Intermediate Average
780	(France) William Fossat	(France) Florent Riviere	No technician	Toyota HZJ73	Egal16	86–98 Moderate Average
781	(Slovakia) Juraj Ulrich	(Slovakia) Lubos Schwarzbacher	No technician	Mitsubishi Pajero	Ulrich Schwarzbacher Dakar Team	86–98 Intermediate Average
782	(Hungary) Tamas Mikucza	(Hungary) Andras Bako	No technician	Mitsubishi Pajero	Miq Team	86–98 Intermediate Average
900	(Spain) Rafael Lesmes Suarez	(Spain) Tabatha Romon	(Spain) Albert Casabona Vilaseca	Mercedes 1844 AK	TH-Trucks Team	86–98 Low Average
901	(Italy) Stefano Calzi	(Italy) Umberto Fiori	(Italy) Gianluca Ianni	MAN 18–285	Motortecnica Racing Team	+99 Moderate Average
902	(Spain) Jaime Martinez Canteli	(Spain) Nekane Abin Bardeci	(Spain) Raquel Pelaez Fernandez	Mercedes 2636 A	TH-Trucks Team	86–98 Low Average
903	(Italy) Giuseppe Simonato	(Italy) Alessio Bentivoglio	(Italy) Irene Saderini	Iveco Magirus	Tecnosport	86–98 Moderate Average
904	(France) Dorian Bardeau	(Spain) Lourdes Puigmal	(France) Franck Puchouau	Renault Kerax	Team Boucou	+99 Moderate Average
905	(Netherlands) Janus Van Kasteren Sr	(Netherlands) Frank Burgers	(Netherlands) Herman Keijsers	DAF Bull	Team De Rooy	86–98 Moderate Average
907	(Czech Republic) Igor Pazdera	(Czech Republic) Olga Lounová	(Czech Republic) Milan Holan	Tatra T815-2	Loprais Tatra Team	+99 Moderate Average
908	(France) Olivier Guillory	(France) Bruno Grilli	(France) Arnaud Vincent	Mercedes 1935	Team Ssp	86–98 Low Average
909	(France) Jérôme Pélichet	(France) Jean-Philippe Beziat	(France) Ludovic Ecochard	Mercedes 1935	Raidlynx	86–98 Low Average
910	(France) Sandra Riviere	(France) Séverine Lehoux	(France) Aurore Valaize	Renault Kerax	Ecurie Freres D'armes	+99 Low Average
911	(Italy) Giuliano Bergo	(Italy) Luca Macrini	(Italy) Rocco Sbaraglia	Iveco Eurocargo	R Team	86–98 Low Average
913	(Italy) Roberto Camporese	(Italy) Paolo Scalzotto	TBC	Mercedes Unimog	Motortecnica Racing Team	86–98 Moderate Average
914	(France) Vincent Cupers	(France) Frederic Cambier	(France) Jean Pierre Wattreloo	Mercedes Unimog	Team Pevéle Aventure	−86 Low Average
915	(France) Hubert Lelievre	(France) Franck Geenens	(France) David Lhermelin	MAN L90	Team Holehot Competition	+99 Moderate Average
916	(France) Julien Bechemin	(France) Pierre Moulinier	(France) Eric Bertrande	Renault Kerax	Team Boucou	86–98 Low Average
917	(Germany) Alexander Schmidt	(Germany) Jan Dippel	(Germany) Nils Schmidt	Mercedes 2636	Rallyeraid-Club-Germany	−86 Low Average
918	(Germany) Robert Thiele	(Germany) Markus Klesse	(Germany) Daniel Schatz	Mercedes 2636	Rallyeraid-Club-Germany	−86 Moderate Average
919	(Argentina) Pablo Alejandro Jaton	(Argentina) Ariel Jaton	(Argentina) Renato Delmastro	Mercedes 2644	Donerre Suspension Team	86–98 Low Average
920	(Czech Republic) Jiri Husek	(Czech Republic) Lubomir Dockal	(Czech Republic) Dominik Holan	Tatra 815	Loprais Tatra Team	86–98 Moderate Average

Entry list – Mission 1000

Note
– The "Dakar Legends" - competitors that participated in 10 or more Dakar events.
– The first time starters - "rookies".
– Competitors that were not able to start the race.

No.	Driver	Co-driver	Technician	Vehicle	Team	Class
1000	(Argentina) Benjamín Pascual	No co-driver	No technician	Segway	Segway	M1000 - Bike
1001	(China) Jianhao Xu	No co-driver	No technician	Segway	Segway	M1000 - Bike
1002	(China) Jie Yang	No co-driver	No technician	Segway	Segway	M1000 - Bike
1030	(Japan) Yoshio Ikemachi	(Portugal) Paulo Marques	No technician	HySE-X2	HySE	M1000 - SSV
1040	(Spain) Jordi Juvanteny	(Spain) José Luis Criado	(Spain) Xavier Ribas	MAN TGA 26.480	KH7-Ecovergy Team	M1000 - Truck

== Stages ==
Stage	Date		Start	Finish	Total/Special
Prologue	Friday	January 3, 2025	Bisha	Bisha	79 km / 29 km
1	Saturday	January 4, 2025	Bisha	Bisha	500 km / 412 km
2 (Marathon)	Sunday-Monday	January 5–6, 2025	Bisha	Bisha	1,057 km / 965 km
3	Tuesday	January 7, 2025	Bisha	Al Henakiyah	845 km / 496 km
4	Wednesday	January 8, 2025	Al Henakiyah	Al-'Ula	588 km / 415 km
5	Thursday	January 9, 2025	Al-'Ula	Ha'il	491 km / 428 km
–	Friday	January 10, 2025	Ha'il		Rest day
6	Saturday	January 11, 2025	Ha'il	Al Duwadimi	829 km / 606 km
7	Sunday	January 12, 2025	Al Duwadimi	Al Duwadimi	745 km / 481 km
8	Monday	January 13, 2025	Al Duwadimi	Riyadh	733 km / 487 km
9	Tuesday	January 14, 2025	Riyadh	Haradh	589 km / 357 km
10	Wednesday	January 15, 2025	Haradh	Shubaytah	638 km / 119 km
11	Thursday	January 16, 2025	Shubaytah	Shubaytah	506 km / 280 km
12	Friday	January 17, 2025	Shubaytah	Shubaytah	131 km / 61 km
Total	-	-	-	-	7,826 km / 134 km

== Stage winners ==
Stage	Bikes	Cars	Challenger (T3)	SSV (T4)	Trucks	Classics	Mission 1000
Prologue	(Australia) Daniel Sanders	(South Africa) Henk Lategan	(United States) Corbin Leaverton	(United States) Brock Heger	(Netherlands) Mitchel van den Brink	(Spain) Juan Morera	(Argentina) Benjamín Pascual
Stage 1	(Australia) Daniel Sanders	(United States) Seth Quintero	(Argentina) Nicolás Cavigliasso	(France) Xavier de Soultrait	(Netherlands) Mitchel van den Brink	(Spain) Carlos Santaolalla	(Spain) Jordi Juvanteny
Stage 2	(Australia) Daniel Sanders	(Lithuania) Rokas Baciuška	(Netherlands) Paul Spierings	(United States) Brock Heger	(Czech Republic) Martin Macík	(Italy) Lorenzo Traglio	(Spain) Jordi Juvanteny
Stage 3	(Spain) Lorenzo Santolino	(South Africa) Saood Variawa	(Argentina) Nicolás Cavigliasso	(Chile) Francisco López Contardo	(Czech Republic) Aleš Loprais	(Spain) Carlos Santaolalla	(Spain) Jordi Juvanteny
Stage 4	(Australia) Daniel Sanders	(Saudi Arabia) Yazeed Al-Rajhi	(Argentina) Nicolás Cavigliasso	(United States) Sara Price	(Czech Republic) Martin Macík	(Spain) Carlos Santaolalla	(Spain) Jordi Juvanteny
Stage 5	(France) Adrien Van Beveren	(United States) Seth Quintero	(Saudi Arabia) Yasir Seaidan	(Chile) Francisco López Contardo	(Czech Republic) Martin Macík	(Spain) Carlos Santaolalla	(Japan) Yoshio Ikemachi
Stage 6	(United States) Ricky Brabec	(Belgium) Guillaume De Mévius	(Saudi Arabia) Yasir Seaidan	(Chile) Francisco López Contardo	(Netherlands) Mitchel van den Brink	(Croatia) Juraj Šebalj	(Japan) Yoshio Ikemachi
Stage 7	(Australia) Daniel Sanders	(Brazil) Lucas Moraes	(United States) Corbin Leaverton	(Argentina) Jeremías González Ferioli	(Czech Republic) Aleš Loprais	(Spain) Carlos Santaolalla	(Spain) Jordi Juvanteny
Stage 8	(Argentina) Luciano Benavides	(South Africa) Henk Lategan	(Spain) Pau Navarro	(Argentina) Jeremías González Ferioli	(Czech Republic) Martin Macík	(Spain) Carlos Santaolalla	(Spain) Jordi Juvanteny
Stage 9	(Argentina) Luciano Benavides	(Qatar) Nasser Al-Attiyah	(Argentina) David Zille	(Chile) Francisco López Contardo	(Czech Republic) Aleš Loprais	(Belgium) Dirk Van Rompuy	(Spain) Jordi Juvanteny
Stage 10	(South Africa) Michael Docherty	(Spain) Nani Roma	(Saudi Arabia) Dania Akeel	(Chile) Francisco López Contardo	(Czech Republic) Aleš Loprais	(Spain) Carlos Santaolalla	(Spain) Jordi Juvanteny
Stage 11	(Spain) Tosha Schareina	(Sweden) Mattias Ekström	(Saudi Arabia) Yasir Seaidan	(United States) Sara Price	(Czech Republic) Martin Macík	(Belgium) Dirk Van Rompuy	(Spain) Jordi Juvanteny
Stage 12	(South Africa) Michael Docherty	(Brazil) Lucas Moraes	(Netherlands) Paul Spierings	(United States) Sara Price	(Czech Republic) Aleš Loprais	(Spain) Carlos Santaolalla	(Argentina) Benjamín Pascual
Rally Winners	(Australia) Daniel Sanders	(Saudi Arabia) Yazeed Al-Rajhi	(Argentina) Nicolás Cavigliasso	(United States) Brock Heger	(Czech Republic) Martin Macík	(Spain) Carlos Santaolalla	(Spain) Jordi Juvanteny

== Stage results ==
=== Bikes ===
	Stage result					General classification				
Stage	Pos	Competitor	Make	Time	Gap	Pos	Competitor	Make	Time	Gap
Prologue	1	(Australia) Daniel Sanders	KTM	00:16:51		1	(Australia) Daniel Sanders	KTM	00:16:51	
Prologue	2	(Botswana) Ross Branch	Hero	00:17:03	00:00:12	2	(Botswana) Ross Branch	Hero	00:17:03	00:00:12
Prologue	3	(Spain) Edgar Canet	KTM	00:17:03	00:00:12	3	(Spain) Edgar Canet	KTM	00:17:03	00:00:12
Stage 1	1	(Australia) Daniel Sanders	KTM	04:41:27		1	(Australia) Daniel Sanders	KTM	04:58:18	
Stage 1	2	(United States) Ricky Brabec	Honda	04:43:31	00:02:04	2	(United States) Ricky Brabec	Honda	05:00:40	00:02:22
Stage 1	3	(Botswana) Ross Branch	Hero	04:43:53	00:02:26	3	(Botswana) Ross Branch	Hero	05:00:56	00:02:38
Stage 2	1	(Australia) Daniel Sanders	KTM	11:12:13		1	(Australia) Daniel Sanders	KTM	16:10:31	
Stage 2	2	(United States) Skyler Howes	Honda	11:19:50	00:07:37	2	(United States) Skyler Howes	Honda	16:23:07	00:12:36
Stage 2	3	(Spain) Tosha Schareina	Honda	11:19:54	00:07:41	3	(Botswana) Ross Branch	Hero	16:23:11	00:12:40
Stage 3	1	(Spain) Lorenzo Santolino	Sherco	03:44:34		1	(Australia) Daniel Sanders	KTM	20:05:00	
Stage 3	2	(United States) Ricky Brabec	Honda	03:48:35	00:04:01	2	(United States) Skyler Howes	Honda	20:11:51	00:06:51
Stage 3	3	(United States) Skyler Howes	Honda	03:48:44	00:04:10	3	(Botswana) Ross Branch	Hero	20:11:59	00:06:59
Stage 4	1	(Australia) Daniel Sanders	KTM	05:10:33		1	(Australia) Daniel Sanders	KTM	25:15:33	
Stage 4	2	(Spain) Tosha Schareina	Honda	05:10:48	00:00:15	2	(Spain) Tosha Schareina	Honda	25:28:59	00:13:26
Stage 4	3	(Chile) José Ignacio Cornejo	Hero	05:18:22	00:07:49	3	(Botswana) Ross Branch	Hero	25:41:43	00:26:10
Stage 5	1	(France) Adrien Van Beveren	Honda	04:51:47		1	(Australia) Daniel Sanders	KTM	30:12:15	
Stage 5	2	(Argentina) Luciano Benavides	KTM	04:53:00	00:01:13	2	(Spain) Tosha Schareina	Honda	30:27:17	00:15:02
Stage 5	3	(Chile) José Ignacio Cornejo	Hero	04:54:31	00:02:44	3	(France) Adrien Van Beveren	Honda	30:36:46	00:24:31
Stage 6	1	(United States) Ricky Brabec	Honda	05:00:51		1	(Australia) Daniel Sanders	KTM	35:18:49	
Stage 6	2	(France) Adrien Van Beveren	Honda	05:01:14	00:00:23	2	(Spain) Tosha Schareina	Honda	35:30:35	00:11:46
Stage 6	3	(Chile) José Ignacio Cornejo	Hero	05:01:42	00:00:51	3	(France) Adrien Van Beveren	Honda	35:38:00	00:19:11
Stage 7	1	(Australia) Daniel Sanders	KTM	04:10:33		1	(Australia) Daniel Sanders	KTM	39:29:22	
Stage 7	2	(Spain) Edgar Canet	KTM	04:14:09	00:03:36	2	(Spain) Tosha Schareina	Honda	39:44:55	00:15:33
Stage 7	3	(Spain) Tosha Schareina	Honda	04:14:20	00:03:47	3	(France) Adrien Van Beveren	Honda	39:55:29	00:26:07
Stage 8	1	(Argentina) Luciano Benavides	KTM	04:50:46		1	(Australia) Daniel Sanders	KTM	44:26:52	
Stage 8	2	(France) Adrien Van Beveren	Honda	04:52:54	00:02:08	2	(Spain) Tosha Schareina	Honda	44:37:55	00:11:03
Stage 8	3	(Spain) Tosha Schareina	Honda	04:53:00	00:02:14	3	(France) Adrien Van Beveren	Honda	44:48:23	00:21:31
Stage 9	1	(Argentina) Luciano Benavides	KTM	03:15:38		1	(Australia) Daniel Sanders	KTM	47:45:34	
Stage 9	2	(France) Adrien Van Beveren	Honda	03:17:32	00:01:54	2	(Spain) Tosha Schareina	Honda	48:00:19	00:14:45
Stage 9	3	(Australia) Daniel Sanders	KTM	03:18:42	00:03:04	3	(France) Adrien Van Beveren	Honda	48:05:55	00:20:21
Stage 10	1	(South Africa) Michael Docherty	KTM	02:00:03		1	(Australia) Daniel Sanders	KTM	49:53:59	
Stage 10	2	(Portugal) Rui Goncalves	Sherco	02:01:23	00:01:20	2	(Spain) Tosha Schareina	Honda	50:10:30	00:16:31
Stage 10	3	(Austria) Tobias Ebster	KTM	02:02:24	00:02:021	3	(France) Adrien Van Beveren	Honda	50:16:23	00:22:24
Stage 11	1	(Spain) Tosha Schareina	Honda	02:12:04		1	(Australia) Daniel Sanders	KTM	52:13:34	
Stage 11	2	(Argentina) Luciano Benavides	KTM	02:12:37	00:00:33	2	(Spain) Tosha Schareina	Honda	52:22:34	00:09:00
Stage 11	3	(France) Adrien Van Beveren	Honda	02:13:01	00:00:57	3	(France) Adrien Van Beveren	Honda	52:29:24	00:15:50
Stage 12	1	(South Africa) Michael Docherty	KTM	00:54:11		1	(Australia) Daniel Sanders	KTM	53:08:52	
Stage 12	2	(France) Adrien Van Beveren	Honda	00:54:14	00:00:03	2	(Spain) Tosha Schareina	Honda	53:17:42	00:08:50
Stage 12	3	(Austria) Tobias Ebster	KTM	00:54:55	00:00:44	3	(France) Adrien Van Beveren	Honda	53:23:38	00:14:46

=== Cars ===
	Stage result					General classification				
Stage	Pos	Competitor	Make	Time	Gap	Pos	Competitor	Make	Time	Gap
Prologue	1	(South Africa) Henk Lategan	Toyota	00:15:28		results of Prologue aren't accountable towards GC, only for starting position on Stage 1				
Prologue	2	(Sweden) Mattias Ekström	Ford	00:15:29	00:00:01	results of Prologue aren't accountable towards GC, only for starting position on Stage 1				
Prologue	3	(Qatar) Nasser Al-Attiyah	Dacia	00:15:48	00:00:20	results of Prologue aren't accountable towards GC, only for starting position on Stage 1				
Stage 1	1	(United States) Seth Quintero	Toyota	04:35:08		1	(United States) Seth Quintero	Toyota	04:35:08	
Stage 1	2	(France) Guerlain Chicherit	Mini	04:35:53	00:00:45	2	(France) Guerlain Chicherit	Mini	04:35:53	00:00:45
Stage 1	3	(South Africa) Saood Variawa	Toyota	04:36:56	00:01:48	3	(South Africa) Saood Variawa	Toyota	04:36:56	00:01:48
Stage 2	1	(Lithuania) Rokas Baciuška	Toyota	10:54:11		1	(South Africa) Henk Lategan	Toyota	15:40:30	
Stage 2	2	(Saudi Arabia) Yazeed Al-Rajhi	Toyota	10:56:54	00:02:43	2	(Saudi Arabia) Yazeed Al-Rajhi	Toyota	15:45:15	00:04:45
Stage 2	3	(Argentina) Juan Cruz Yacopini	Toyota	11:00:34	00:06:23	3	(Qatar) Nasser Al-Attiyah	Dacia	15:51:44	00:11:14
Stage 3	1	(South Africa) Saood Variawa	Toyota	03:16:52		1	(South Africa) Henk Lategan	Toyota	19:04:53	
Stage 3	2	(France) Guerlain Chicherit	Mini	03:17:25	00:00:33	2	(Qatar) Nasser Al-Attiyah	Dacia	19:12:10	00:07:17
Stage 3	3	(United States) Seth Quintero	Toyota	03:18:40	00:01:48	3	(Sweden) Mattias Ekström	Ford	19:14:27	00:09:34
Stage 4	1	(Saudi Arabia) Yazeed Al-Rajhi	Toyota	04:26:40		1	(South Africa) Henk Lategan	Toyota	23:36:24	
Stage 4	2	(South Africa) Henk Lategan	Toyota	04:31:31	00:04:51	2	(Saudi Arabia) Yazeed Al-Rajhi	Toyota	23:43:18	00:06:54
Stage 4	3	(Argentina) Juan Cruz Yacopini	Toyota	04:37:25	00:10:45	3	(Sweden) Mattias Ekström	Ford	23:58:04	00:21:40
Stage 5	1	(United States) Seth Quintero	Toyota	04:32:53		1	(South Africa) Henk Lategan	Toyota	28:10:11	
Stage 5	2	(Qatar) Nasser Al-Attiyah	Dacia	04:32:54	00:00:01	2	(Saudi Arabia) Yazeed Al-Rajhi	Toyota	28:20:28	00:10:17
Stage 5	3	(Sweden) Mattias Ekström	Ford	04:33:01	00:00:08	3	(Sweden) Mattias Ekström	Ford	28:31:05	00:20:54
Stage 6	1	(Belgium) Guillaume De Mévius	Mini	03:34:49		1	(South Africa) Henk Lategan	Toyota	32:51:36	
Stage 6	2	(Portugal) João Ferreira	Mini	04:36:23	00:01:34	2	(Saudi Arabia) Yazeed Al-Rajhi	Toyota	32:58:52	00:07:16
Stage 6	3	(Qatar) Nasser Al-Attiyah	Dacia	04:36:50	00:02:01	3	(Sweden) Mattias Ekström	Ford	33:14:03	00:22:27
Stage 7	1	(Brazil) Lucas Moraes	Toyota	04:01:49		1	(South Africa) Henk Lategan	Toyota	37:13:08	
Stage 7	2	(Sweden) Mattias Ekström	Ford	04:09:30	00:07:41	2	(Saudi Arabia) Yazeed Al-Rajhi	Toyota	37:13:29	00:00:21
Stage 7	3	(United States) Mitch Guthrie	Ford	04:11:17	00:09:28	3	(Sweden) Mattias Ekström	Ford	37:23:33	00:10:25
Stage 8	1	(South Africa) Henk Lategan	Toyota	04:51:54		1	(South Africa) Henk Lategan	Toyota	42:05:02	
Stage 8	2	(South Africa) Guy Botterill	Toyota	04:53:41	00:01:47	2	(Saudi Arabia) Yazeed Al-Rajhi	Toyota	42:10:43	00:05:41
Stage 8	3	(France) Mathieu Serradori	Century	04:55:58	00:04:04	3	(Sweden) Mattias Ekström	Ford	42:33:57	00:28:55
Stage 9	1	(Qatar) Nasser Al-Attiyah	Dacia	02:52:59		1	(Saudi Arabia) Yazeed Al-Rajhi	Toyota	45:06:54	
Stage 9	2	(Belgium) Guillaume De Mévius	Mini	02:55:46	00:02:47	2	(South Africa) Henk Lategan	Toyota	45:14:03	00:07:09
Stage 9	3	(Saudi Arabia) Yazeed Al-Rajhi	Toyota	02:56:11	00:03:12	3	(Sweden) Mattias Ekström	Ford	45:31:44	00:24:50
Stage 10	1	(Spain) Nani Roma	Ford	02:06:34		1	(South Africa) Henk Lategan	Toyota	47:29:57	
Stage 10	2	(Brazil) Lucas Moraes	Toyota	02:06:52	00:00:18	2	(Saudi Arabia) Yazeed Al-Rajhi	Toyota	47:34:24	00:02:27
Stage 10	3	(South Africa) Brian Baragwanath	Century	02:08:55	00:02:21	3	(Sweden) Mattias Ekström	Ford	47:56:43	00:26:46
Stage 11	1	(Sweden) Mattias Ekström	Ford	04:19:27		1	(Saudi Arabia) Yazeed Al-Rajhi	Toyota	51:53:36	
Stage 11	2	(Qatar) Nasser Al-Attiyah	Dacia	04:20:08	00:00:41	2	(South Africa) Henk Lategan	Toyota	51:59:47	00:06:11
Stage 11	3	(Saudi Arabia) Yazeed Al-Rajhi	Toyota	04:21:12	00:01:45	3	(Sweden) Mattias Ekström	Ford	52:16:10	00:22:34
Stage 12	1	(Brazil) Lucas Moraes	Toyota	00:54:14		1	(Saudi Arabia) Yazeed Al-Rajhi	Toyota	52:52:15	
Stage 12	2	(Qatar) Nasser Al-Attiyah	Dacia	04:20:08	00:01:33	2	(South Africa) Henk Lategan	Toyota	52:56:12	00:03:47
Stage 12	3	(South Africa) Henk Lategan	Toyota	04:21:12	00:02:11	3	(Sweden) Mattias Ekström	Ford	53:12:36	00:20:21

=== Challenger (T3) ===
	Stage result					General classification				
Stage	Pos	Competitor	Make	Time	Gap	Pos	Competitor	Make	Time	Gap
Prologue	1	(United States) Corbin Leaverton	Taurus	00:17:17		results of Prologue aren't accountable towards GC, only for starting position on Stage 1				
Prologue	2	(Portugal) Gonçalo Guerreiro	Taurus	00:17:21	00:00:04	results of Prologue aren't accountable towards GC, only for starting position on Stage 1				
Prologue	3	(Argentina) Nicolás Cavigliasso	Taurus	00:17:28	00:00:11	results of Prologue aren't accountable towards GC, only for starting position on Stage 1				
Stage 1	1	(Argentina) Nicolás Cavigliasso	Taurus	04:47:12		1	(Argentina) Nicolás Cavigliasso	Taurus	04:47:12	
Stage 1	2	(Portugal) Gonçalo Guerreiro	Taurus	04:47:16	00:00:04	2	(Portugal) Gonçalo Guerreiro	Taurus	04:47:16	00:00:04
Stage 1	3	(Qatar) Abdulaziz Al-Kuwari	Taurus	04:57:10	00:09:58	3	(Qatar) Abdulaziz Al-Kuwari	Taurus	04:57:10	00:09:58
Stage 2	1	(Netherlands) Paul Spierings	Taurus	11:57:48		1	(Argentina) Nicolás Cavigliasso	Taurus	16:45:02	
Stage 2	2	(Argentina) Nicolás Cavigliasso	Taurus	11:57:50	00:00:02	2	(Portugal) Gonçalo Guerreiro	Taurus	16:51:22	00:06:20
Stage 2	3	(United States) Corbin Leaverton	Taurus	12:00:49	00:03:01	3	(United States) Corbin Leaverton	Taurus	17:03:26	00:18:24
Stage 3	1	(Argentina) Nicolás Cavigliasso	Taurus	03:39:41		1	(Argentina) Nicolás Cavigliasso	Taurus	20:24:43	
Stage 3	2	(Saudi Arabia) Yasir Seaidan	Taurus	03:39:56	00:00:15	2	(Portugal) Gonçalo Guerreiro	Taurus	20:44:12	00:19:29
Stage 3	3	(Saudi Arabia) Dania Akeel	Taurus	03:40:07	00:00:26	3	(United States) Corbin Leaverton	Taurus	20:46:52	00:22:09
Stage 4	1	(Argentina) Nicolás Cavigliasso	Taurus	05:07:43		1	(Argentina) Nicolás Cavigliasso	Taurus	25:32:26	
Stage 4	2	(United States) Corbin Leaverton	Taurus	05:10:48	00:03:05	2	(United States) Corbin Leaverton	Taurus	25:57:40	00:25:14
Stage 4	3	(Qatar) Abdulaziz Al-Kuwari	Taurus	05:11:53	00:04:10	3	(Portugal) Gonçalo Guerreiro	Taurus	26:02:01	00:29:35
Stage 5	1	(Saudi Arabia) Yasir Seaidan	Taurus	04:51:27		1	(Argentina) Nicolás Cavigliasso	Taurus	30:38:42	
Stage 5	2	(Netherlands) Paul Spierings	Taurus	04:59:49	00:08:22	2	(Portugal) Gonçalo Guerreiro	Taurus	31:07:16	00:28:34
Stage 5	3	(Qatar) Abdulaziz Al-Kuwari	Taurus	05:00:19	00:08:52	3	(Netherlands) Paul Spierings	Taurus	31:12:08	00:33:26
Stage 6	1	(Saudi Arabia) Yasir Seaidan	Taurus	05:04:21		1	(Argentina) Nicolás Cavigliasso	Taurus	35:57:59	
Stage 6	2	(United States) Corbin Leaverton	Taurus	05:09:47	00:05:26	2	(Portugal) Gonçalo Guerreiro	Taurus	36:33:01	00:35:02
Stage 6	3	(Spain) Pau Navarro	Taurus	05:14:09	00:09:48	3	(Netherlands) Paul Spierings	Taurus	36:38:51	00:40:52
Stage 7	1	(United States) Corbin Leaverton	Taurus	04:27:54		1	(Argentina) Nicolás Cavigliasso	Taurus	40:35:04	
Stage 7	2	(Saudi Arabia) Yasir Seaidan	Taurus	04:28:18	00:00:24	2	(Portugal) Gonçalo Guerreiro	Taurus	41:05:41	00:30:37
Stage 7	3	(Spain) Pau Navarro	Taurus	04:31:32	00:03:38	3	(Netherlands) Paul Spierings	Taurus	41:17:35	00:42:31
Stage 8	1	(Spain) Pau Navarro	Taurus	05:22:29		1	(Argentina) Nicolás Cavigliasso	Taurus	46:08:33	
Stage 8	2	(Netherlands) Paul Spierings	Taurus	05:23:52	00:01:23	2	(Portugal) Gonçalo Guerreiro	Taurus	46:34:22	00:25:49
Stage 8	3	(Argentina) David Zille	Taurus	05:26:17	00:03:48	3	(Netherlands) Paul Spierings	Taurus	46:41:27	00:32:54
Stage 9	1	(Argentina) David Zille	Taurus	03:26:50		1	(Argentina) Nicolás Cavigliasso	Taurus	49:38:09	
Stage 9	2	(Qatar) Abdulaziz Al-Kuwari	Taurus	03:27:01	00:00:11	2	(Portugal) Gonçalo Guerreiro	Taurus	50:06:07	00:27:58
Stage 9	3	(Qatar) Khalifa Al-Attiyah	Taurus	03:28:51	00:02:01	3	(Netherlands) Paul Spierings	Taurus	50:42:04	01:03:55
Stage 10	1	(Saudi Arabia) Dania Akeel	Taurus	02:08:14		1	(Argentina) Nicolás Cavigliasso	Taurus	51:54:09	
Stage 10	2	(Spain) Pau Navarro	Taurus	02:11:18	00:03:04	2	(Portugal) Gonçalo Guerreiro	Taurus	52:20:09	00:26:00
Stage 10	3	(Portugal) Gonçalo Guerreiro	Taurus	02:14:02	00:05:48	3	(Spain) Pau Navarro	Taurus	53:37:02	01:42:53
Stage 11	1	(Saudi Arabia) Yasir Seaidan	Taurus	04:32:09		1	(Argentina) Nicolás Cavigliasso	Taurus	56:44:09	
Stage 11	2	(Spain) Pau Navarro	Taurus	04:37:18	00:05:09	2	(Portugal) Gonçalo Guerreiro	Taurus	57:55:45	01:11:36
Stage 11	3	(Saudi Arabia) Dania Akeel	Taurus	04:39:09	00:07:00	3	(Spain) Pau Navarro	Taurus	58:14:20	01:30:11
Stage 12	1	(Netherlands) Paul Spierings	Taurus	00:57:24		1	(Argentina) Nicolás Cavigliasso	Taurus	57:50:21	
Stage 12	2	(Saudi Arabia) Yasir Seaidan	Taurus	00:57:38	00:00:14	2	(Portugal) Gonçalo Guerreiro	Taurus	59:01:59	01:11:38
Stage 12	3	(Saudi Arabia) Dania Akeel	Taurus	00:58:24	00:01:00	3	(Spain) Pau Navarro	Taurus	59:20:34	01:30:13

=== SSV (T4) ===
	Stage result					General classification				
Stage	Pos	Competitor	Make	Time	Gap	Pos	Competitor	Make	Time	Gap
Prologue	1	(United States) Brock Heger	Polaris	00:17:40		results of Prologue aren't accountable towards GC, only for starting position on Stage 1				
Prologue	2	(Argentina) Jeremías González Ferioli	Can-Am	00:17:59	00:00:19	results of Prologue aren't accountable towards GC, only for starting position on Stage 1				
Prologue	3	(France) Xavier de Soultrait	Polaris	00:18:05	00:00:25	results of Prologue aren't accountable towards GC, only for starting position on Stage 1				
Stage 1	1	(France) Xavier de Soultrait	Polaris	04:52:43		1	(France) Xavier de Soultrait	Polaris	04:52:43	
Stage 1	2	(Chile) Francisco López Contardo	Can-Am	05:00:18	00:07:35	2	(Chile) Francisco López Contardo	Can-Am	05:00:18	00:07:35
Stage 1	3	(United States) Brock Heger	Polaris	05:05:23	00:12:40	3	(United States) Brock Heger	Polaris	05:05:23	00:12:40
Stage 2	1	(United States) Brock Heger	Polaris	11:57:43		1	(France) Xavier de Soultrait	Polaris	16:57:52	
Stage 2	2	(France) Xavier de Soultrait	Polaris	12:05:09	00:07:26	2	(United States) Brock Heger	Polaris	17:03:06	00:05:14
Stage 2	3	(Portugal) Alexandre Pinto	Can-Am	12:35:51	00:38:08	3	(Portugal) Alexandre Pinto	Can-Am	18:00:41	01:02:49
Stage 3	1	(Chile) Francisco López Contardo	Can-Am	03:46:37		1	(France) Xavier de Soultrait	Polaris	20:48:16	
Stage 3	2	(France) Xavier de Soultrait	Polaris	03:50:24	00:03:47	2	(United States) Brock Heger	Polaris	20:53:55	00:05:39
Stage 3	3	(United States) Brock Heger	Polaris	03:50:49	00:04:12	3	(Portugal) Alexandre Pinto	Can-Am	22:00:50	01:12:34
Stage 4	1	(United States) Sara Price	Can-Am	05:13:38		1	(United States) Brock Heger	Polaris	26:25:40	
Stage 4	2	(Chile) Francisco López Contardo	Can-Am	05:14:46	00:01:08	2	(France) Xavier de Soultrait	Polaris	27:47:07	01:21:27
Stage 4	3	(United States) Brock Heger	Polaris	05:31:45	00:18:07	3	(Portugal) Alexandre Pinto	Can-Am	27:55:35	01:29:55
Stage 5	1	(Chile) Francisco López Contardo	Can-Am	05:02:26		1	(United States) Brock Heger	Polaris	31:51:54	
Stage 5	2	(United States) Brock Heger	Polaris	05:23:14	00:20:48	2	(France) Xavier de Soultrait	Polaris	33:10:24	01:18:30
Stage 5	3	(France) Xavier de Soultrait	Polaris	05:23:17	00:20:51	3	(Portugal) Alexandre Pinto	Can-Am	33:26:14	01:34:20
Stage 6	1	(Chile) Francisco López Contardo	Can-Am	05:17:35		1	(United States) Brock Heger	Polaris	37:21:01	
Stage 6	2	(France) Xavier de Soultrait	Polaris	05:19:06	00:01:31	2	(France) Xavier de Soultrait	Polaris	38:28:30	01:07:29
Stage 6	3	(United States) Brock Heger	Polaris	05:29:07	00:11:32	3	(Chile) Francisco López Contardo	Can-Am	39:08:28	01:47:27
Stage 7	1	(Argentina) Jeremías González Ferioli	Can-Am	04:34:50		1	(United States) Brock Heger	Polaris	41:56:42	
Stage 7	2	(United States) Brock Heger	Polaris	04:35:41	00:00:51	2	(France) Xavier de Soultrait	Polaris	43:32:36	01:35:54
Stage 7	3	(Chile) Francisco López Contardo	Can-Am	04:44:18	00:09:28	3	(Chile) Francisco López Contardo	Can-Am	43:52:46	01:56:04
Stage 8	1	(Argentina) Jeremías González Ferioli	Can-Am	05:34:39		1	(United States) Brock Heger	Polaris	47:33:59	
Stage 8	2	(United States) Brock Heger	Polaris	05:37:17	00:02:38	2	(France) Xavier de Soultrait	Polaris	49:15:25	01:41:26
Stage 8	3	(Switzerland) Jérôme de Sadeleer	Can-Am	05:42:00	00:07:21	3	(Chile) Francisco López Contardo	Can-Am	49:42:48	02:08:49
Stage 9	1	(Chile) Francisco López Contardo	Can-Am	03:38:10		1	(United States) Brock Heger	Polaris	51:13:20	
Stage 9	2	(United States) Brock Heger	Polaris	03:39:21	00:01:11	2	(France) Xavier de Soultrait	Polaris	53:03:13	01:49:53
Stage 9	3	(Argentina) Jeremías González Ferioli	Can-Am	03:40:24	00:02:14	3	(Chile) Francisco López Contardo	Can-Am	53:21:33	02:08:13
Stage 10	1	(Chile) Francisco López Contardo	Can-Am	02:10:45		1	(United States) Brock Heger	Polaris	53:25:31	
Stage 10	2	(Argentina) Jeremías González Ferioli	Can-Am	02:11:10	00:00:25	2	(France) Xavier de Soultrait	Polaris	55:15:24	01:49:53
Stage 10	3	(United States) Sara Price	Can-Am	02:12:21	00:01:25	3	(Chile) Francisco López Contardo	Can-Am	55:32:18	02:06:47
Stage 11	1	(United States) Sara Price	Can-Am	04:35:06		1	(United States) Brock Heger	Polaris	58:04:54	
Stage 11	2	(Chile) Francisco López Contardo	Can-Am	04:38:36	00:03:30	2	(Chile) Francisco López Contardo	Can-Am	60:10:54	02:06:00
Stage 11	3	(Argentina) Jeremías González Ferioli	Can-Am	04:38:41	00:03:35	3	(Portugal) Alexandre Pinto	Can-Am	61:42:00	03:37:06
Stage 12	1	(United States) Sara Price	Can-Am	00:58:53		1	(United States) Brock Heger	Polaris	59:13:11	
Stage 12	2	(Argentina) Jeremías González Ferioli	Can-Am	00:59:44	00:00:51	2	(Chile) Francisco López Contardo	Can-Am	61:19:15	02:06:04
Stage 12	3	(Argentina) Manuel Andujar	Can-Am	01:01:05	00:02:12	3	(Portugal) Alexandre Pinto	Can-Am	62:50:22	03:37:11

=== Trucks ===
	Stage result					General classification				
Stage	Pos	Competitor	Make	Time	Gap	Pos	Competitor	Make	Time	Gap
Prologue	1	(Netherlands) Mitchel van den Brink	Iveco	00:18:03		results of Prologue aren't accountable towards GC, only for starting position on Stage 1				
Prologue	2	(Lithuania) Vaidotas Žala	Iveco	00:18:10	00:00:07	results of Prologue aren't accountable towards GC, only for starting position on Stage 1				
Prologue	3	(Czech Republic) Martin Macík	Iveco	00:18:26	00:00:23	results of Prologue aren't accountable towards GC, only for starting position on Stage 1				
Stage 1	1	(Netherlands) Mitchel van den Brink	Iveco	05:11:09		1	(Netherlands) Mitchel van den Brink	Iveco	05:11:09	
Stage 1	2	(Czech Republic) Aleš Loprais	Iveco	05:12:49	00:01:40	2	(Czech Republic) Aleš Loprais	Iveco	05:12:49	00:01:40
Stage 1	3	(Czech Republic) Martin Macík	Iveco	05:13:38	00:02:29	3	(Czech Republic) Martin Macík	Iveco	05:13:38	00:02:29
Stage 2	1	(Czech Republic) Martin Macík	Iveco	12:10:51		1	(Czech Republic) Martin Macík	Iveco	17:24:29	
Stage 2	2	(Czech Republic) Aleš Loprais	Iveco	12:20:34	00:09:43	2	(Czech Republic) Aleš Loprais	Iveco	17:33:23	00:08:54
Stage 2	3	(Lithuania) Vaidotas Žala	Iveco	12:29:43	00:18:52	3	(Lithuania) Vaidotas Žala	Iveco	18:03:19	00:38:50
Stage 3	1	(Czech Republic) Aleš Loprais	Iveco	03:36:21		1	(Czech Republic) Martin Macík	Iveco	21:06:10	
Stage 3	2	(Lithuania) Vaidotas Žala	Iveco	03:37:14	00:00:53	2	(Czech Republic) Aleš Loprais	Iveco	21:09:44	00:03:34
Stage 3	3	(Netherlands) Mitchel van den Brink	Iveco	03:38:28	00:02:07	3	(Lithuania) Vaidotas Žala	Iveco	21:40:33	00:34:23
Stage 4	1	(Czech Republic) Martin Macík	Iveco	05:02:46		1	(Czech Republic) Martin Macík	Iveco	26:08:56	
Stage 4	2	(Netherlands) Mitchel van den Brink	Iveco	05:06:24	00:03:38	2	(Czech Republic) Aleš Loprais	Iveco	26:54:50	00:45:54
Stage 4	3	(Netherlands) Kees Koolen	Iveco	05:11:31	00:08:45	3	(Lithuania) Vaidotas Žala	Iveco	27:05:13	00:56:17
Stage 5	1	(Czech Republic) Martin Macík	Iveco	05:01:53		1	(Czech Republic) Martin Macík	Iveco	31:10:49	
Stage 5	2	(Netherlands) Kees Koolen	Iveco	05:20:35	00:18:42	2	(Netherlands) Mitchel van den Brink	Iveco	33:07:22	01:56:33
Stage 5	3	(Netherlands) Mitchel van den Brink	Iveco	05:41:30	00:39:37	3	(Czech Republic) Aleš Loprais	Iveco	33:27:42	02:16:53
Stage 6	1	(Netherlands) Mitchel van den Brink	Iveco	05:17:19		1	(Czech Republic) Martin Macík	Iveco	36:35:08	
Stage 6	2	(Czech Republic) Martin Macík	Iveco	05:24:19	00:07:00	2	(Netherlands) Mitchel van den Brink	Iveco	38:24:41	01:49:33
Stage 6	3	(Czech Republic) Martin Šoltys	Tatra	05:46:26	00:29:07	3	(Czech Republic) Aleš Loprais	Iveco	39:16:21	02:41:13
Stage 7	1	(Czech Republic) Aleš Loprais	Iveco	04:33:31		1	(Czech Republic) Martin Macík	Iveco	41:19:05	
Stage 7	2	(Lithuania) Vaidotas Žala	Iveco	04:43:05	00:09:34	2	(Netherlands) Mitchel van den Brink	Iveco	43:27:07	02:08:02
Stage 7	3	(Czech Republic) Martin Macík	Iveco	04:43:57	00:10:26	3	(Czech Republic) Aleš Loprais	Iveco	43:49:52	02:30:47
Stage 8	1	(Czech Republic) Martin Macík	Iveco	05:26:52		1	(Czech Republic) Martin Macík	Iveco	46:45:57	
Stage 8	2	(Czech Republic) Aleš Loprais	Iveco	05:32:14	00:05:22	2	(Netherlands) Mitchel van den Brink	Iveco	49:15:41	02:29:44
Stage 8	3	(Lithuania) Vaidotas Žala	Iveco	05:33:17	00:06:25	3	(Czech Republic) Aleš Loprais	Iveco	49:22:06	02:36:09
Stage 9	1	(Czech Republic) Aleš Loprais	Iveco	03:20:51		1	(Czech Republic) Martin Macík	Iveco	50:14:19	
Stage 9	2	(Netherlands) Mitchel van den Brink	Iveco	03:22:20	00:01:29	2	(Netherlands) Mitchel van den Brink	Iveco	52:38:01	02:23:42
Stage 9	3	(Lithuania) Vaidotas Žala	Iveco	03:26:33	00:05:42	3	(Czech Republic) Aleš Loprais	Iveco	52:42:57	02:28:38
Stage 10	1	(Czech Republic) Aleš Loprais	Iveco	02:22:41		1	(Czech Republic) Martin Macík	Iveco	52:39:23	
Stage 10	2	(Netherlands) Mitchel van den Brink	Iveco	02:23:29	00:00:48	2	(Netherlands) Mitchel van den Brink	Iveco	55:01:30	02:22:27
Stage 10	3	(Czech Republic) Martin Macík	Iveco	02:25:04	00:02:23	3	(Czech Republic) Aleš Loprais	Iveco	55:05:38	02:26:15
Stage 11	1	(Czech Republic) Martin Macík	Iveco	04:55:14		1	(Czech Republic) Martin Macík	Iveco	57:34:37	
Stage 11	2	(Netherlands) Kees Koolen	Iveco	04:55:21	00:00:07	2	(Netherlands) Mitchel van den Brink	Iveco	59:59:38	02:25:01
Stage 11	3	(Lithuania) Vaidotas Žala	Iveco	04:57:21	00:02:07	3	(Czech Republic) Aleš Loprais	Iveco	60:05:18	02:30:41
Stage 12	1	(Czech Republic) Aleš Loprais	Iveco	01:04:23		1	(Czech Republic) Martin Macík	Iveco	58:42:58	
Stage 12	2	(Netherlands) Mitchel van den Brink	Iveco	01:04:33	00:00:10	2	(Netherlands) Mitchel van den Brink	Iveco	61:04:11	02:21:13
Stage 12	3	(Lithuania) Vaidotas Žala	Iveco	01:06:42	00:02:19	3	(Czech Republic) Aleš Loprais	Iveco	61:09:41	02:26:43

=== Classics ===
	Stage result					General classification				
Stage	Pos	Competitor	Make	Points	Gap	Pos	Competitor	Make	Points	Gap
Prologue	1	(Spain) Juan Morera	Porsche	16		results of Prologue aren't accountable towards GC, only for starting position on Stage 1				
Prologue	2	(Spain) Carlos Santaolalla	Toyota	18	+2	results of Prologue aren't accountable towards GC, only for starting position on Stage 1				
Prologue	3	(Italy) Marco Ernesto Leva	Mitsubishi	19	+3	results of Prologue aren't accountable towards GC, only for starting position on Stage 1				
Stage 1	1	(Spain) Carlos Santaolalla	Toyota	27		1	(Spain) Carlos Santaolalla	Toyota	27	
Stage 1	2	(Spain) Juan Morera	Porsche	34	+7	2	(Spain) Juan Morera	Porsche	34	+7
Stage 1	3	(Croatia) Juraj Šebalj	Toyota	35	+8	3	(Croatia) Juraj Šebalj	Toyota	35	+8
Stage 2	1	(Italy) Lorenzo Traglio	Nissan	103		1	(Italy) Lorenzo Traglio	Nissan	179	
Stage 2	2	(Italy) Filippo Giorgio Colnaghi	Nissan	176	+73	2	(Italy) Filippo Giorgio Colnaghi	Nissan	227	+48
Stage 2	3	(France) Maxence Gulbin	Land Rover	182	+79	3	(Spain) Carlos Santaolalla	Toyota	231	+52
Stage 3	1	(Spain) Carlos Santaolalla	Toyota	45		1	(Italy) Lorenzo Traglio	Nissan	241	
Stage 3	2	(Spain) Juan Morera	Porsche	46	+1	2	(Spain) Carlos Santaolalla	Toyota	276	+35
Stage 3	3	(France) Maxence Gulbin	Land Rover	60	+15	3	(France) Maxence Gulbin	Land Rover	295	+54
Stage 4	1	(Spain) Carlos Santaolalla	Toyota	50		1	(Italy) Lorenzo Traglio	Nissan	295	
Stage 4	2	(Spain) Juan Morera	Porsche	51	+1	2	(Spain) Carlos Santaolalla	Toyota	326	+31
Stage 4	3	(Italy) Lorenzo Traglio	Nissan	54	+4	3	(Spain) Juan Morera	Porsche	359	+64
Stage 5	1	(Spain) Carlos Santaolalla	Toyota	59		1	(Italy) Lorenzo Traglio	Nissan	354	
Stage 5	2	(Italy) Lorenzo Traglio	Nissan	59	+0	2	(Spain) Carlos Santaolalla	Toyota	385	+31
Stage 5	3	(Spain) Juan Morera	Porsche	62	+3	3	(Spain) Juan Morera	Porsche	421	+67
Stage 6	1	(Croatia) Juraj Šebalj	Toyota	48		1	(Spain) Carlos Santaolalla	Nissan	454	
Stage 6	2	(France) Maxence Gulbin	Land Rover	50	+2	2	(Italy) Lorenzo Traglio	Toyota	470	+16
Stage 6	3	(Lithuania) Karolis Raišys	Land Rover	57	+9	3	(Spain) Juan Morera	Porsche	484	+30
Stage 7	1	(Spain) Carlos Santaolalla	Nissan	40		1	(Spain) Carlos Santaolalla	Nissan	494	
Stage 7	2	(Croatia) Juraj Šebalj	Toyota	40	+0	2	(Italy) Lorenzo Traglio	Toyota	514	+20
Stage 7	3	(Italy) Lorenzo Traglio	Toyota	44	+4	3	(France) Maxence Gublin	Land Rover	609	+115
Stage 8	1	(Spain) Carlos Santaolalla	Nissan	32		1	(Spain) Carlos Santaolalla	Nissan	526	
Stage 8	2	(Italy) Lorenzo Traglio	Toyota	39	+7	2	(Italy) Lorenzo Traglio	Toyota	553	+27
Stage 8	3	(Lithuania) Karolis Raišys	Land Rover	47	+15	3	(France) Maxence Gublin	Land Rover	669	+144
Stage 9	1	(Belgium) Dirk Van Rompuy	Toyota	24		1	(Spain) Carlos Santaolalla	Nissan	554	
Stage 9	2	(Italy) Lorenzo Traglio	Toyota	26	+2	2	(Italy) Lorenzo Traglio	Toyota	579	+25
Stage 9	3	(Spain) Carlos Santaolalla	Nissan	28	+4	3	(France) Maxence Gublin	Land Rover	713	+159
Stage 10	1	(Spain) Carlos Santaolalla	Toyota	7		1	(Spain) Carlos Santaolalla	Nissan	561	
Stage 10	2	(Italy) Lorenzo Traglio	Toyota	13	+6	2	(Italy) Lorenzo Traglio	Toyota	592	+31
Stage 10	3	(Croatia) Juraj Šebalj	Toyota	15	+8	3	(Lithuania) Karolis Raišys	Land Rover	955	+31
Stage 11	1	(Belgium) Dirk Van Rompuy	Toyota	0		1	(Spain) Carlos Santaolalla	Nissan	586	
Stage 11	2	(Spain) Asier Duarte Rodriquez	Toyota	15	+15	2	(Italy) Lorenzo Traglio	Toyota	617	+31
Stage 11	3	(France) David Cupers	Toyota	20	+20	3	(Lithuania) Karolis Raišys	Land Rover	980	+394
Stage 12	1	(Spain) Carlos Santaolalla	Nissan	0		1	(Spain) Carlos Santaolalla	Nissan	586	
Stage 12	2	(Italy) Lorenzo Traglio	Toyota	0		2	(Italy) Lorenzo Traglio	Toyota	617	+31
Stage 12	3	(Belgium) Dirk Van Rompuy	Toyota	0		3	(Lithuania) Karolis Raišys	Land Rover	980	+394

=== Mission 1000 ===
	Stage result					General classification				
Stage	Pos	Competitor	Make	Points	Gap	Pos	Competitor	Make	Points	Gap
Prologue	1	(Argentina) Benjamín Pascual	Segway	20		1	(Argentina) Benjamín Pascual	Segway	20	
Prologue	2	(Japan) Yoshiro Ikemachi	HySE	15	+5	2	(Japan) Yoshiro Ikemachi	HySE	15	+5
Prologue	3	(Spain) Jordi Juvanteny	MAN	15	+5	3	(Spain) Jordi Juvanteny	MAN	15	+5
Stage 1	1	(Spain) Jordi Juvanteny	MAN	15		1	(Argentina) Benjamín Pascual	Segway	30	
Stage 1	2	(Japan) Yoshiro Ikemachi	HySE	10	+5	2	(Spain) Jordi Juvanteny	MAN	30	+0
Stage 1	3	(Argentina) Benjamín Pascual	Segway	10	+5	3	(Japan) Yoshiro Ikemachi	HySE	25	+5
Stage 2	1	(Spain) Jordi Juvanteny	MAN	20		1	(Spain) Jordi Juvanteny	MAN	65	
Stage 2	2	(Japan) Yoshiro Ikemachi	HySE	15	+5	2	(Japan) Yoshiro Ikemachi	HySE	50	+15
Stage 2	3	(China) Jianhao Xu	Segway	10	+10	3	(Argentina) Benjamín Pascual	Segway	45	+20
Stage 3	1	(Spain) Jordi Juvanteny	MAN	15		1	(Spain) Jordi Juvanteny	MAN	80	
Stage 3	2	(Japan) Yoshiro Ikemachi	HySE	10	+5	2	(Japan) Yoshiro Ikemachi	HySE	60	+20
Stage 3	3	(China) Jie Yang	Segway	10	+5	3	(Argentina) Benjamín Pascual	Segway	55	+25
Stage 4	1	(Spain) Jordi Juvanteny	MAN	15		1	(Spain) Jordi Juvanteny	MAN	95	
Stage 4	2	(Japan) Yoshiro Ikemachi	HySE	15	+0	2	(Japan) Yoshiro Ikemachi	HySE	75	+20
Stage 4	3	(Argentina) Benjamín Pascual	Segway	10	+5	3	(Argentina) Benjamín Pascual	Segway	65	+30
Stage 5	1	(Japan) Yoshiro Ikemachi	HySE	25		1	(Spain) Jordi Juvanteny	MAN	115	
Stage 5	2	(Argentina) Benjamín Pascual	Segway	25	+0	2	(Japan) Yoshiro Ikemachi	HySE	100	+15
Stage 5	3	(Spain) Jordi Juvanteny	MAN	20	+5	3	(Argentina) Benjamín Pascual	Segway	90	+25
Stage 6	1	(Japan) Yoshiro Ikemachi	HySE	30		1	(Spain) Jordi Juvanteny	MAN	140	
Stage 6	2	(Spain) Jordi Juvanteny	MAN	25	+5	2	(Japan) Yoshiro Ikemachi	HySE	130	+10
Stage 6	3	(Argentina) Benjamín Pascual	Segway	22	+8	3	(Argentina) Benjamín Pascual	Segway	112	+28
Stage 7	1	(Spain) Jordi Juvanteny	MAN	20		1	(Spain) Jordi Juvanteny	MAN	160	
Stage 7	2	(Japan) Yoshiro Ikemachi	HySE	15	+5	2	(Japan) Yoshiro Ikemachi	HySE	145	+15
Stage 7	3	(Argentina) Benjamín Pascual	Segway	15	+5	3	(Argentina) Benjamín Pascual	Segway	127	+33
Stage 8	1	(Spain) Jordi Juvanteny	MAN	20		1	(Spain) Jordi Juvanteny	MAN	180	
Stage 8	2	(Japan) Yoshiro Ikemachi	HySE	20	+0	2	(Japan) Yoshiro Ikemachi	HySE	165	+15
Stage 8	3	(Argentina) Benjamín Pascual	Segway	20	+0	3	(Argentina) Benjamín Pascual	Segway	147	+33
Stage 9	1	(Spain) Jordi Juvanteny	MAN	20		1	(Spain) Jordi Juvanteny	MAN	200	
Stage 9	2	(Japan) Yoshiro Ikemachi	HySE	20	+0	2	(Japan) Yoshiro Ikemachi	HySE	185	+15
Stage 9	3	(Argentina) Benjamín Pascual	Segway	15	+5	3	(Argentina) Benjamín Pascual	Segway	162	+33
Stage 10	1	(Spain) Jordi Juvanteny	MAN	20		1	(Spain) Jordi Juvanteny	MAN	220	
Stage 10	2	(Japan) Yoshiro Ikemachi	HySE	20	+0	2	(Japan) Yoshiro Ikemachi	HySE	205	+15
Stage 10	3	(China) Jie Yang	Segway	7	+13	3	(Argentina) Benjamín Pascual	Segway	169	+51
Stage 11	1	(Spain) Jordi Juvanteny	MAN	20		1	(Spain) Jordi Juvanteny	MAN	240	
Stage 11	2	(Japan) Yoshiro Ikemachi	HySE	20	+0	2	(Japan) Yoshiro Ikemachi	HySE	225	+15
Stage 11	3	(Argentina) Benjamín Pascual	Segway	6	+14	3	(Argentina) Benjamín Pascual	Segway	175	+65
Stage 12	1	(Argentina) Benjamín Pascual	Segway	20		1	(Spain) Jordi Juvanteny	MAN	249	
Stage 12	2	(China) Jie Yang	Segway	10	+10	2	(Japan) Yoshiro Ikemachi	HySE	235	+14
Stage 12	3	(China) Jianhao Xu	Segway	10	+10	3	(Argentina) Benjamín Pascual	Segway	195	+54

== Final standings ==
=== Bikes ===
Final standings (positions 1–10)
Rank	Rider	Bike	Time	Difference
1	(Australia) Daniel Sanders	KTM 450 Rally Factory	53:08:52	
2	(Spain) Tosha Schareina	Honda CRF450 Rally	53:17:42	+0:08:50
3	(France) Adrien van Beveren	Honda CRF450 Rally	53:23:38	+0:14:46
4	(Argentina) Luciano Benavides	KTM 450 Rally Factory	53:31:08	+0:22:16
5	(United States) Ricky Brabec	Honda CRF450 Rally	53:38:42	+0:29:50
6	(United States) Skyler Howes	Honda CRF450 Rally	53:51:36	+0:42:44
7	(Chile) José Ignacio Cornejo	Hero 450 Rally	54:07:12	+0:58:20
8	(Spain) Edgar Canet	KTM 450 Rally Replica	54:49:21	+1:40:29
9	(Austria) Tobias Ebster	KTM 450 Rally Replica	55:22:46	+2:13:54
10	(Slovakia) Štefan Svitko	KTM 450 Rally Replica	55:23:30	+2:14:38

=== Cars ===
Final standings (positions 1–10)
Rank	Driver	Co-Driver	Car	Time	Difference
1	(Saudi Arabia) Yazeed Al-Rajhi	(Germany) Timo Gottschalk	Toyota Hilux Overdrive	52:52:15	
2	(South Africa) Henk Lategan	(South Africa) Brett Cummings	Toyota Hilux IMT Evo	52:56:12	+0:03:57
3	(Sweden) Mattias Ekström	(Sweden) Emil Bergkvist	Ford Raptor	53:12:36	+0:20:21
4	(Qatar) Nasser Al-Attiyah	(France) Edouard Boulanger	Dacia Sandrider	53:16:13	+0:23:58
5	(United States) Mitch Guthrie	(United States) Kellon Walch	Ford Raptor	53:54:25	+1:02:10
6	(France) Mathieu Serradori	(France) Loic Minaudier	Century CR7	54:04:19	+1:12:04
7	(Argentina) Juan Cruz Yacopini	(Spain) Daniel Oliveras	Toyota Hilux Overdrive	54:50:02	+1:57:47
8	(Portugal) João Ferreira	(Portugal) Filipe Palmeiro	X-Raid Mini JCW Rally 3.0D	55:08:12	+2:15:57
9	(United States) Seth Quintero	(Germany) Dennis Zenz	Toyota GR DKR Hilux	55:12:19	+2:20:04
10	(Czech Republic) Martin Prokop	(Czech Republic) Viktor Chytka	Ford Raptor	56:14:29	+3:22:14

=== Challenger (T3) ===
Final standings (positions 1–10)
Rank	Driver	Co-Driver	Car	Time	Difference
1	(Argentina) Nicolás Cavigliasso	(Argentina) Valentina Pertegarini	Taurus T3 Max	57:50:21	
2	(Portugal) Gonçalo Guerreiro	(Brazil) Cadu Sachs	Taurus T3 Max	59:01:59	+1:11:38
3	(Spain) Pau Navarro	(Argentina) Lisandro Ezequiel Sisterna Herrera	Taurus T3 Max	59:20:34	+1:30:13
4	(Qatar) Abdulaziz Al-Kuwari	(Qatar) Nasser Al-Kuwari	Taurus T3 Max	61:32:03	+3:41:42
5	(Poland) Adam Kus	(Ukraine) Dmytro Tsyro	Taurus T3 Max	64:57:02	+7:06:41
6	(France) Jedidia Favre	(France) Antoine Lecourbe	MMP Rally Raid	66:09:03	+8:19:22
7	(France) Romain Locmane	(France) Benjamin Boulloud	Can-Am Maverick XRS	68:38:10	+10:47:49
8	(France) Christophe Cresp	(France) Jean Brucy	MMP Rally Raid	70:30:38	+12:40:17
9	(Netherlands) Lex Peters	(Netherlands) Mark Salomons	Arcane T3	72:33:20	+14:42:59
10	(United States) Zachary Lumsden	(United States) Shannon Moham	Can-Am Maverick X3	72:36:16	+14:45:55

=== SSV (T4) ===
Final standings (positions 1–10)
Rank	Driver	Co-Driver	Car	Time	Difference
1	(United States) Brock Heger	(United States) Max Eddy	Polaris RZR Pro R Sport	59:13:11	
2	(Chile) Francisco López Contardo	(Chile) Juan Pablo Latrach	Can-Am Maverick R	61:19:15	+2:06:04
3	(Portugal) Alexandre Pinto	(Portugal) Bernardo Oliveira	BRP Can-Am Maverick XRS Turbo RR	62:50:22	+3:37:11
4	(Switzerland) Jérôme de Sadeleer	(Spain) Diego Ortega Gil	BRP Can-Am Maverick XRS Turbo RR	64:30:05	+5:16:54
5	(Italy) Enrico Gaspari	(Spain) Fausto Mota	Polaris RZR Pro R Sport	69:09:02	+9:55:51
6	(Spain) Gerard Farrés	(Spain) Toni Vingut	BRP Can-Am Maverick XRS Turbo RR	70:36:04	+11:22:53
7	(Portugal) Joao Monteiro	(Portugal) Nuno Morais	BRP Can-Am Maverick R	71:41:41	+12:28:30
8	(Netherlands) Roger Grouwels	(Netherlands) Rudolf Meijer	BRP Can-Am Maverick XRS Turbo RR	72:43:31	+13:30:20
9	(Spain) Fidel Castillo	(Argentina) Anuar Osman	BRP Can-Am Maverick XRS Turbo RR	74:17:43	+15:04:32
10	(United States) Hunter Miller	(United States) Andrew Short	BRP Can-Am Maverick R	74:27:50	+15:14:39

=== Trucks ===
Final standings (positions 1–10)
Rank	Driver	Co-Driver	Technician	Truck	Time	Difference
1	(Czech Republic) Martin Macík	(Czech Republic) František Tomášek	(Czech Republic) David Švanda	Iveco PowerStar	58:42:58	
2	(Netherlands) Mitchel van den Brink	(Netherlands) Jarno Van De Pol	(Spain) Moises Torrallardona	Iveco PowerStar	61:04:11	+2:21:13
3	(Czech Republic) Aleš Loprais	(Poland) Darek Rodewald	(Czech Republic) David Kripal	Iveco PowerStar	61:09:41	+2:26:43
4	(Netherlands) Kees Koolen	(Netherlands) Wouter De Graaff	(Czech Republic) Daniel Kozlowsky	Iveco PowerStar	64:57:40	+6:14:42
5	(Lithuania) Vaidotas Žala	(Portugal) Paulo Fiuza	(Netherlands) Max Van Grol	Iveco PowerStar	66:00:22	+7:17:24
6	(Netherlands) Martin van den Brink	(Netherlands) Richard Mouw	(Netherlands) Bart van Huen	Iveco PowerStar	66:33:41	+7:50:43
7	(Netherlands) Richard De Groot	(Netherlands) Johannes Hulsebosch	(Belgium) Jan Van Der Vaet	Iveco PowerStar	70:48:19	+12:05:21
8	(Netherlands) Anja Van Loon	(Netherlands) Ben Van De Laar	(Netherlands) Jan Van De Laar	Iveco PowerStar	73:44:58	+15:02:00
9	(Czech Republic) Tomáš Vrátný	(Poland) Bartlomiej Boba	(Czech Republic) Jaromir Martinec	Tatra FF7	82:24:22	+23:41:24
10	(Netherlands) William De Groot	(Netherlands) Koen Hendriks	(Netherlands) Remon Van Der Steen	Iveco PowerStar	88:14:25	+29:31:27

=== Classics ===
Final standings (positions 1–10)
Rank	Driver	Co-Driver	Technician	Vehicle	Points	Difference
1	(Spain) Carlos Santaolalla Milla	(Spain) Jan Rosa I Viñas	No technician	Toyota HDJ 80	586	
2	(Italy) Lorenzo Traglio	(Italy) Rudy Briani	No technician	Nissan Terrano Pick-up	617	+31
3	(Lithuania) Karolis Raišys	(Lithuania) Ignas Daunoravičius	No technician	Land Rover Series III	980	+394
4	(Poland) Tomasz Staniszewski	(Poland) Stanislaw Postawka	No technician	Porsche 924	1274	+687
5	(Italy) Marco Ernesto Leva	(Italy) Alexia Giugni	No technician	Mitsubishi Pajero	1429	+843
6	(Belgium) Dirk Van Rompuy	(Belgium) Christiaan Michel Goris	No technician	Toyota HDJ 80	1686	+1100
7	(Germany) Jörg Sand	(Germany) Patrick Diemer	No technician	Mercedes G	1740	+1154
8	(Italy) Antonio Ricciari	(Italy) Simona Morosi	No technician	Mitsubishi Pajero	1828	+1242
9	(Spain) Rafael Lesmes Suarez	(Spain) Tabatha Romon	(Spain) Albert Casabona Vilaseca	Mercedes 1844 AK	1896	+1310
10	(Italy) Josef Unterholzner	(Italy) Franco Gaioni	No technician	Mitsubishi Pajero	1913	+1327

=== Mission 1000 ===
Final standings (positions 1–5)
Rank	Driver	Co-Driver	Technician	Vehicle	Points	Difference
1	(Spain) Jordi Juvanteny	(Spain) José Luis Criado	(Spain) Xavier Ribas	MAN TGA 26.480	249	
2	(Japan) Yoshio Ikemachi	(Portugal) Paulo Marques	No technician	HySE-X2	235	-14
3	(Argentina) Benjamin Pascual	No co-driver	No technician	Segway	195	-54
4	(China) Jianhao Xu	No co-driver	No technician	Segway	145	-104
5	(China) Jie Yang	No co-driver	No technician	Segway	129	-120
