= Jordi Juvanteny =

Spanish rally raid driver (born 1960)

- Nationality: Spanish
- Born: 6 April 1960 (age 66) Sant Feliu de Llobregat, Spain
- Debut season: 1991

Championship titles
- 2024, 2025, 2026: Dakar Rally (Mission 1000)

Jordi Juvanteny (born 6 April 1960) is a Spanish rally raid driver who specializes in the truck category.

Juvanteny has 34 participations in the Dakar Rally, and from 1995 to 2021, he participated with the Andalusian José Luis Criado as co-pilot (resuming the partnership in 2023), who with 33 participations is the Spaniard with the most presences in the Dakar Rally, surpassing in one participation to Xavi Foj and Juvanteny himself, and two participations to Rafa Tibau Sr. He won the 2024, 2025 and 2026 editions of the Dakar Rally in the Mission 1000 category.

== Career ==
Juvanteny first participated in the Dakar Rally in 1991. Juvanteny and Criado have 16 victories in the 6x6 category and four victories in Production (series trucks). In 2023, they participated with a truck partially powered by hydrogen, becoming the first hydrogen-powered truck to finish the Dakar Rally.

Juvanteny returned to the Dakar Rally in 2024 alongside Criado and Xavier Ribas, this time in the Mission 1000 category. With this category, he won his first stage in the third stage. Having held the overall lead from then on, Juvanteny became the inaugural event winner in the Mission 1000 category. In 2025, Juvanteny won the Dakar Rally again in his category. He repeated this feat in the 2026 edition.
