= Daniel Sanders (motorcyclist) =

Australian motorcycle rider (born 1994)

- Nationality: Australian
- Born: 30 August 1994 (age 32) Three Bridges, Victoria, Australia

Dakar Rally career
- Debut season: 2021
- Starts: 6
- Wins: 1 (10 stage wins)
- Best finish: 1st in 2025

Daniel Jonathan Sanders (born 30 August 1994) is an Australian professional off-road and rally raid motorcycle racer. Known by the nickname "Chucky", he is most famous for winning the 2025 Dakar Rally and the 2025 World Rally-Raid Championship.

== Racing career ==
Sanders began his motorsport career at the age of 13, taking part in various enduro and motocross club races and later in various local Australian championships. Until moving up to the seniors, he was a top-3 rider, but was never able to take first place. In 2014, he won the Australian Enduro U19 class and finished sixth in the Australian Offroad Championship the same year. In 2015, Sanders finished fourth in the Australian Championship and second in the Enduro 3 behind Toby Price. In the same year, he won the FIM Junior World Trophy (Junior World Championship) with the Australian national team, won the junior class and finished 4th across all classes in the International Six Days Enduro.

In 2015 and 2019, Sanders was the winner of the E3 class and in 2018 he was the International Six Days Enduro champion. In 2017, he finished sixth in the Enduro 2 class of the Enduro World Championship, and in 2018, he was the winner of Australia's biggest rally raid, the Hattah Desert Race. In 2019, he became Australian Enduro Champion. In 2020, he finished 11th in the Rally Andalusia and in 2021, third in the Abu Dhabi Desert Challenge and fourth in both the Rallye du Maroc and the Silk Way Rally.

Sanders has been competing in the Dakar Rally since 2021, where he finished fourth overall and was named "Best Rookie" as a KTM privateer in 2021, and has been riding for the GasGas Factory Racing Team since 2022. At the 2022 Dakar Rally, Sanders won three of the six stages in the motorcycle class and was third overall at that time, until he was involved in an accident shortly before the start of the seventh stage special stage and had to retire from the rally. At the 2023 Dakar Rally, Sanders won the third stage and led the overall standings until the fourth stage. He finished the rally in seventh place, 25 minutes behind, after suffering from food poisoning. At the 2024 Dakar Rally, Sanders struggled with injuries, managing only a single stage podium in the prologue, and finishing 8th overall, nearly one and a quarter hours behind winner Ricky Brabec.

At the 2025 Dakar Rally, Sanders dominated the race from the initial prologue stage. He added further stage wins on Stages 1, 2, 4, and 7 and remained overall leader throughout the entire rally. He won the race with an advantage of just under 9 minutes and 15 minutes over Honda riders Tosha Schareina and Adrien van Beveren, respectively. He also won the Abu Dhabi Desert Challenge, South Africa Safari Rally and Rally-Raid Portugal, which earned him the 2025 World Rally-Raid Championship title in the RallyGP class.

== Career results ==
=== Rally Dakar results ===
| Year | Class | Vehicle | Position | Stage wins |
|---|---|---|---|---|
| 2021 | Bikes | (Austria) KTM | 4th | 0 |
| 2022 | Bikes | (Spain) GasGas | DNF | 3 |
| 2023 | Bikes | (Spain) GasGas | 7th | 1 |
| 2024 | Bikes | (Spain) GasGas | 8th | 0 |
| 2025 | Bikes | (Austria) KTM | 1st | 5 |
| 2026 | Bikes | (Austria) KTM | 5th | 1 |
