= Martin Macík =

Czech rally raid truck driver

Martin Macík (born 23 April 1989 in Benešov) is a Czech rally raid truck driver. Macík has been a frequent participant of the Dakar Rally. He is the winner of the 2024 Dakar Rally and 2025 Dakar Rally in the trucks category.

== Dakar Rally results ==
Year	Class	Vehicle	Position	Stages won
2013*	Trucks	(Czech Republic) LIAZ	18th	0
2014*	Trucks	(Czech Republic) LIAZ	13th	0
2015	Trucks	(Czech Republic) LIAZ	DNF	0
2016	Trucks	(Czech Republic) LIAZ	19	0
2017	Trucks	(Czech Republic) LIAZ	10th	0
2018	Trucks	(Czech Republic) LIAZ	5th	0
2019	Trucks	(Czech Republic) LIAZ	18th	0
2020	Trucks	(Italy) Iveco	5th	0
2021	Trucks	(Italy) Iveco	4th	3
2022	Trucks	(Italy) Iveco	7th	0
2023	Trucks	(Italy) Iveco	2nd	5
2024	Trucks	(Italy) Iveco	1st	3
2025	Trucks	(Italy) Iveco	1st	5
2026	Trucks	(Italy) Iveco	4th	2

- Co-driver for Vlastimil Vildman

Sporting positions
Preceded by Janus van Kasteren	Dakar Rally; Truck winner 2024	Succeeded by incumbent
