= Tosha Schareina =

Spanish motorcycle racer (born 1995)

- Nationality: Spanish
- Born: 3 June 1995 (age 31) Valencia, Spain

Dakar Rally career
- Debut season: 2021
- Starts: 5
- Wins: 0 (4 stage wins)
- Best finish: 2nd in 2025

Tosha Schareina Marzal (born 3 June 1995) is a Spanish motorcycle racer, whose achievements include notable performances in the Dakar Rally and other international rally raid and enduro events. Since 2023, he has been part of the official Honda team, with whom he competes in international rallies.

== Early life ==
Schareina is the son of a German father and a Spanish mother; his parents are Torsten Alexander Schareina (born in Braunschweig, near Hanover) and Mara Marzal. He became interested in motorcycling at a very early age, where he was introduced by his maternal uncle Mariano, who competed at a regional level in motocross events. As a child, he was already practicing on his motorcycle on the circuit in Paterna, a town in Valencia where his uncle lived.

== Career ==
=== Early career ===
In 2015, at the age of 20, Schareina won the Spanish Cross Country Championship in the Junior category with a Sherco. That year he signed his first professional contract with Husqvarna and won the Spanish championship again, this time in the Senior category. In addition, he participated for the first time in Enduro World Championship races and in the International Six Days of Enduro (ISDE), where he was part of the Spanish national team for four consecutive years.

=== Rally raid ===
Schareina made his debut in rally raid racing in 2020 and won the "Road to Dakar" category in the Andalucia Rally that same year, enabling him to race in the Dakar Rally for the next year. In 2021, he debuted in the Dakar Rally with a KTM and finished the event in thirteenth place, in addition to being the second best rookie and winning the Marathon category. In 2022, he won the Baja Aragón, but was unable to participate in the Dakar Rally due to late registration. In 2023, he joined the Monster Energy Honda team, with which he won the Baja Aragón again and obtained another victory in Desafío Ruta 40, in addition to qualifying thirteenth in the Dakar Rally again.

In 2024, Schareina suffered a fall in the Dakar Rally in which he fractured his wrist, which prevented him from scoring points and participating in the Abu Dhabi Desert Challenge. The points lost in both races made him lose his chances of winning the W2RC Championship, in which he nevertheless finished in third place thanks to his return to racing with a victory in the Rally of Portugal (where he obtained three stage victories), a second place in the Desafío Ruta 40 (he won the prologue and two more stages) and another second place in the Rally of Morocco (he won the prologue and two more stages). That year, Schareina also won the FIM E-Xplorer World Cup, a new championship reserved for electric motorcycles.

Schareina finished the 2025 Dakar Rally in second place, less than nine minutes behind winner Daniel Sanders, after having been in second place for much of the race.

== Career results ==
=== Rally Dakar results ===
Year	Class	Vehicle	Position	Stage wins
2021	Bikes	(Austria) KTM	13th	0
2023	Bikes	(Austria) KTM	13th	0
2024	Bikes	(Japan) Honda	Ret	1
2025	Bikes	(Japan) Honda	2nd	1
2026	Bikes	(Japan) Honda	3rd	3
