= Brock Heger =

American racing driver

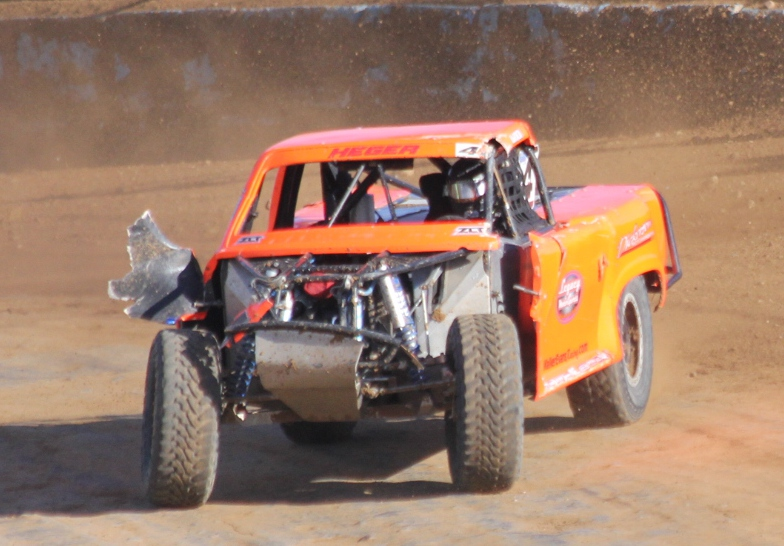
- Nationality: (United States) American
- Born: January 17, 2000 (age 26) California, U.S.

Championship titles
- 2014 2017, 2018 2020 2021, 2022 2025,2026: LOORRS Modified Karts; LOORRS Production 1000 UTV; LOORRS Pro Lite Unlimited; COR Pro Stock SxS; Dakar Rally SSV

Brock Heger (born January 17, 2000) is an American professional off-road racing driver. He raced in the Lucas Oil Off Road Racing Series, winning the championship four times in three different categories. He has also competed in Championship Off-Road, where he won the Pro Stock SxS championship in 2021 and 2022. In rally raid, he won the 2025 Dakar Rally and the 2026 Dakar Rally in the SSV category.

== Racing career ==
Heger made his debut in the Stadium Super Trucks Series, competing in the penultimate round of the 2013 season. He then moved to the Lucas Oil Off Road Racing Series, where he won his first championship in the Modified Karts category. He then won the championship in the Production 1000 UTV category in 2017 and 2018, and the Pro Light Unlimited category in 2020 before the series folded that year.

Heger made his Dakar Rally debut in 2025, in the SSV category. He won the prologue and second stage before taking the overall lead from stage 4 onwards en route to winning the event.
