= Xavier de Soultrait =

French rally driver and motorcyclist

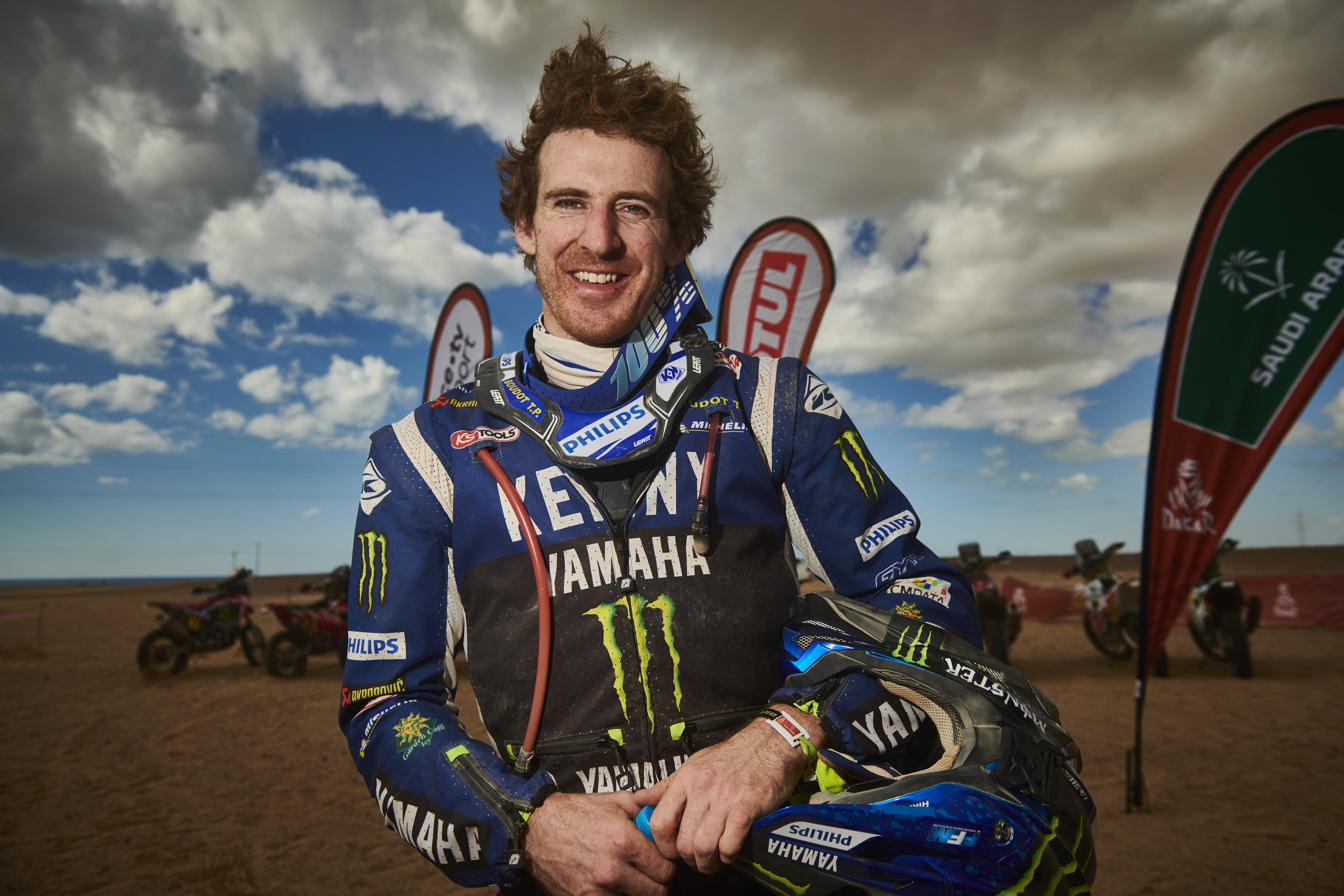
- Xavier de Soultrait at the 2020 Dakar Rally
- Nationality: French
- Born: 9 May 1988 (age 38)

Xavier de Soultrait (born 9 May 1988) is a French rally motorcyclist and driver. De Soultrait has competed primarily in rally raid events, including the Dakar Rally. He won the 2024 Dakar Rally in the SSV class.

== Career ==
De Soultrait began his rally racing career on motorcycles. He made his Dakar Rally debut in 2014, finishing in 34th position. In 2016, de Soultrait won the FIM Bajas World Cup, at the time the top championship for motorcycle rally raids. In 2019, de Soultrait achieved his best finish in the Dakar Rally on bikes, finishing seventh.

In the 2021 Dakar Rally, de Soultrait suffered back injuries in an accident on Stage 8. Though he would return to bikes for 2022, the injuries led de Soultrait to move to four-wheel vehicles for 2023. He entered the SSV class for 2023, finishing 19th in his four-wheel debut. In 2024, de Soultrait won the SSV class for his first career Dakar victory.

== Results ==
=== Dakar Rally ===
Year	Class	Vehicle	Position	Stages won
2014	Bikes	(Japan) Yamaha	34th	0
2015	Bikes	(Japan) Yamaha	13th	0
2016	Bikes	(Japan) Yamaha	DNF	0
2017	Bikes	(Japan) Yamaha	87th	1
2018	Bikes	(Japan) Yamaha	DNF	0
2019	Bikes	(Japan) Yamaha	7th	1
2020	Bikes	(Japan) Yamaha	DNF	0
2021	Bikes	(Austria) Husqvarna	DNF	0
2022	Bikes	(Austria) Husqvarna	15th	0
2023	SSV	(United States) Polaris	19th	0
2024	SSV	(United States) Polaris	1st	3
