= Shaybah =

Shaybah Oil Field شيبة
- Location in the southeast of Saudi Arabia
- Coordinates: 22°30′37.5″N 53°57′07.0″E
- Country: Saudi Arabia

Population (2016)
  - Total: 1,500
- Time zone: UTC+3 (UTC+03:00)
  - Summer (DST): +3

External image
- Shaybah mega-project

Shaybah, also called as Zararah, is a settlement dominated by a major crude oil production oil site, the Shaybah oil field, in Saudi Arabia, located approximately 40 kilometres (25 mi) from the northern edge of the Rub' Al-Khali ("Empty Quarter") desert. It is about 10 kilometres (6.2 miles) south of the border to Abu Dhabi, United Arab Emirates, which is a straight line drawn in the desert. It is 40 kilometres (25 miles) south of the eastern part of Abu Dhabi's Liwa Oasis.

== Climate ==
Shaybah's weather is extreme, with the temperature dropping to 0 degrees Celsius on winter nights, rising to around 50 degrees Celsius in the summer daytime. Annual rainfall is less than 3 cm per year.

== Transportation ==
=== Airport ===
Shaybah Airport, a small airport serving the oil facilities, is used exclusively by Saudi Aramco. It provides flights to Dammam, Al-Hasa, Jeddah and Riyadh.

== Industry ==
Oil was discovered with Shaybah Well No. 1 in 1967, and 30 vertical field delineation wells had been drilled by 1974. However, due to the very large number of wells required to achieve a minimum capacity of 250,000 bd of commercial production, the field was not developed at that time. Starting in 1993 with the advent of extended reach horizontal wells and geo-steering in Saudi Aramco, a detailed evaluation of the productivity of horizontal wells was carried out in Shaybah field. The program confirmed that average well productivities would be increased from 500 bd in vertical wells to over 5000 bd in horizontal wells, without incurring gas or water coning.

The improvement in well productivities allowed a change in project scope from 500 oil wells to deliver 250,000 bd of capacity to 140 oil and associated gas injection wells to deliver 550,000 bd of capacity. This change reduced the budgeted capital cost from $6.0 billion to $3.3 billion allowing the Saudi Aramco management in 1995 to approve the Shaybah field development ahead of other projects in Ghawar.

Additional drilling and oil and gas processing capacity allowed the Shaybah field capacity to be increased in 2010 to 750,000 bd and to 1 million bd in 2016, including NGL recovery from the associated gas and a dedicated NGL pipeline to the Abqaiq plants.

A 386 km road had to be built across the dunes followed by a large landing strip to accommodate cargo jets. A central processing facility includes 3 gas oil separation plants, a gas compression plant, water desalination, housing facilities for 1,000 men, a library, swimming pool, and gymnasium. A 645 km high pressure pipeline connects the field with Abqaiq, and from there it connects into a network to the Ras Tanura and Juaymah export terminals.

The Shaybah oilfield has estimated 'extra light' crude oil reserves of over 14 billion barrels (2.2×10^{9} m^{3}) and 25 trillion cubic feet (710 km^{3}) of natural gas. The field is about 64 km long and 13 km wide, with production from a depth of about 2 km. Water occurs below and gas above the oil zone, so horizontal drilling extending up to 12 km were employed to increase production efficiency up to 12,000 barrels per day. Geosteering and 3D seismic imaging guided the well trajectories. Production came online in July 1998, on schedule and $800 million under budget. The total number of drilled wells as of June 2021 stood at 255 wells, including 205 horizontal oil wells, 34 vertical oil wells, 8 wells for gas injection, and 5 wells of groundwater.

On 12 March 2026, during the 2026 Iran war, Saudi Arabia intercepted an Iranian drone headed towards the Shaybah oilfield.

== Telecommunications ==
There is a 650-kilometer fibre optic cable linking Shaybah to the main radio system at Abqaiq.
