= Rally Kazakhstan =

Off-road vehicle race

- Region: Kazakhstan
- Inaugural season: 2017
- Official website: rallykazakhstan.com

The Rally Kazakhstan is a rally-raid which is held in the country of Kazakhstan since 2017. Motorcycles first took part in 2021; with the original debut cancelled in 2020 due to the COVID-19 pandemic. The event was part of the FIA World Cup for Cross-Country Rallies since 2017; now part of the combined World Rally-Raid Championship.

The rally is organized and promoted by the Automotosport Federation of the Republic of Kazakhstan.

The 2020 and 2022 editions were cancelled due to the COVID-19 pandemic and Russian invasion of Ukraine, respectively.

== Winners ==
=== Cars ===
| Year | Driver | Codriver | Car |
|---|---|---|---|
| 2017 | (Qatar) Nasser Al-Attiyah | (France) Matthieu Baumel | Toyota Hilux |
| 2018 | (Saudi Arabia) Yazeed Al Rajhi | (Germany) Timo Gottschalk | Mini JCW Rally |
| 2019 | (Qatar) Nasser Al-Attiyah | (France) Matthieu Baumel | Toyota Hilux |
| 2020 | Cancelled due to COVID-19 pandemic | | |
| 2021 | (Argentina) Lucio Alvarez | (Spain) Armand Monleón | Toyota Hilux |
| 2022 | Cancelled due to Russian invasion of Ukraine | | |

=== Motorcycles ===
| Year | Rider | Motorcycle |
|---|---|---|
| 2020 | Cancelled due to COVID-19 pandemic | |
| 2021 | (Botswana) Ross Branch | Yamaha WRF 450 Rally |
| 2022 | Cancelled due to Russian invasion of Ukraine | |

=== Quads ===
| Year | Rider | Motorcycle |
|---|---|---|
| 2020 | Cancelled due to COVID-19 pandemic | |
| 2021 | (Argentina) Manuel Andujar | Yamaha Raptor 700R |
| 2022 | Cancelled due to Russian invasion of Ukraine | |
