= 2019 FIA World Cup for Cross-Country Rallies =

2019 FIA World Cup for Cross-Country Rallies
Previous:	2018	Next:	2020

The 2019 FIA World Cup for Cross-Country Rallies was the 27th season of the FIA World Cup for Cross-Country Rallies; an annual competition for rally raid events for cars, buggies, side-by-sides, and trucks held in multiple countries.

== Calendar ==
The 2019 edition of the world cup featured five cross country rallies. The shorter 'baja' style events are now included in their international competition, the FIA World Cup for Cross-Country Bajas. Some events on the schedule were shared with the 2019 FIM Cross-Country Rallies World Championship.

The FIA awards the world cup to drivers, co-drivers, and teams competing in the T1 category; whilst drivers and teams in the T2 and T3 categories are awarded FIA cups. The T4 'truck' category is recognized, but not awarded any end-of-season cup or trophy.

Due to irreconcilable differences between the FIA and Turkmenistan, the Turkmen Desert Race was cancelled for 2019; thereby leaving the calendar with just four events.

Round	Dates	Rally name	Ref.
1	21–26 February	Manateq Qatar Cross-Country Rally	
2	30 March – 4 April	(United Arab Emirates) Abu Dhabi Desert Challenge	
-	5–11 May	(Turkmenistan) Turkmen Desert Race (cancelled)	
3	26 May – 1 June	Rally Kazakhstan	
4	4–8 October	(Morocco) Rallye OiLibya du Maroc	

== Notable teams and drivers ==
Constructor	Car	Team	Driver	Co-driver	Category	Rounds
Borgward	Borgward BX7 DKR EVO	(Germany) Borgward Rally Team	(Spain) Joan "Nani" Roma	(Spain) Dani Oliveras	T1	4
BMW	BMW X3	(Russia) VRT	(Russia) Vladimir Vasilyev	(Russia) Konstantin Zhiltsov	T1	1-2
Can-Am	Can-Am Maverick X3	(Germany) Monster Energy Can-Am	(Brazil) Reinaldo Marquez Varela	(Brazil) Gustavo Souza Gugelmin	T3	1–4
Can-Am	Can-Am Maverick X3	(Germany) Monster Energy Can-Am	(United States) Casey Currie	(France) Laurent Lichtleuchter	T3	2
Can-Am	Can-Am Maverick X3	(Germany) Monster Energy Can-Am	(United States) Casey Currie	(South Africa) Sean Berriman	T3	4
Can-Am	Can-Am Maverick X3	(Germany) Monster Energy Can-Am	(Spain) Gerard Farres Guell	(Spain) Armand Monleon Hernandez	T3	4
Can-Am	Can-Am Maverick X3	(Qatar) Ahmed Fahad Alkuwari	(Qatar) Ahmed Fahad Alkuwari	(Italy) Manuel Mucchese	T3	1–2
Can-Am	Can-Am Maverick X3	(Qatar) QMMF Team	(Qatar) Adel Abdulla	(Spain) Marc Serra	T3	1
Can-Am	Can-Am Maverick X3	(Qatar) QMMF Team	(Qatar) Mohammed Al-Attiyah	(Uruguay) Sergio Lafuente	T3	1
Can-Am	Can-Am Maverick X3	(Germany) South Racing	(Chile) Hernan Garces	(Chile) Juan Pablo Latrach	T3	2, 4
Can-Am	Can-Am Maverick X3	(Germany) South Racing	(Poland) Aron Domzala	(Poland) Maciej Marton	T3	4
Can-Am	Can-Am Maverick X3	(Germany) South Racing	(Andorra) Ilya Rouss	(Andorra) Anton Yarashuk	T3	4
Can-Am	Can-Am Maverick X3	(Germany) South Racing	(United States) Austin Jones	(United States) Kellon Walch	T3	4
Can-Am	Can-Am Maverick X3	(Germany) South Racing	(Colombia) Antonio Marmolejo	(Argentina) Eduardo Blanco	T3	4
Can-Am	Can-Am Maverick X3	(Russia) Zavidovo Racing Team	(Russia) Fedor Vorobyev	(Russia) Kirill Shubin	T3	1–4
Can-Am	Can-Am Maverick X3	(Oman) AZ Racing Team	(Oman) Abdullah Al Zubair	(Qatar) Nasser Al Kuwari	T3	1–2, 4
Can-Am	Can-Am Maverick X3	(Saudi Arabia) Saled Abdullahs Alsaif	(Saudi Arabia) Saleh Alsaif		T3	1–2
Can-Am	Can-Am Maverick X3	(Latvia) Sports Racing Technologies	(Russia) Aleksandr Dorosinskiy	(Latvia) Oleg Uperenko	T3	4
Can-Am	Can-Am Maverick X3	(Netherlands) Kees Koolen	(Netherlands) Kees Koolen	(Spain) Monica Plaza	T3	4
Can-Am	Can-Am Maverick X3	(Russia) Team Maria Oparina	(Russia) Maria Oparina	(Russia) Lyudmila Petenko	T3	3
Can-Am	Can-Am Maverick X3	(Russia) Team Maria Oparina	(Russia) Tatiana Sycheva	(Russia) Aleksandr Alekseev	T3	3
Can-Am	Can-Am Maverick X3	(Russia) Dmitry Pitulov	(Russia) Dmitry Pitulov	(Russia) Andrei Chipenko	T3	3
Century	Century Racing CR6	(France) Mathieu Serradori	(France) Mathieu Serradori	(France) Fabian Lurquin	T1	4
Chevrolet	Chevrolet Silverado	(United Arab Emirates) Khalid Al Jafla	(United Arab Emirates) Khalid Al Jafla	(Belarus) Andrei Rudnitski	T1	2
Chevrolet	Chevrolet Jeep	(Qatar) Abdullah Al Rabban	(Qatar) Abdullah Al Rabban	(Austria) Dennis Nikitopulis	T1	1
Desert Warrior	Rally Raid UK Desert Warrior III	(Egypt) Ahmed Al Shamy	(Egypt) Ahmed Al Shamy	(Egypt) Alain Besançon	T1	1–2
Ford	Ford Raptor RS Cross Country	(Czech Republic) MP-Sports	(Czech Republic) Martin Prokop	(Czech Republic) Viktor Chytka	T1	2, 4
Ford	Ford F150	(Czech Republic) OFFROADSPORT	(Czech Republic) Miroslav Zapletal	(Slovakia) Marek Sykora	T1	1–3
Ford	Ford F150	Off Road Kazakhstan	(Kazakhstan) Andrey Cherednikov	(Ukraine) Dimitri Tsyro	T1	2
Ford	Ford F150	Off Road Kazakhstan	(Kazakhstan) Andrey Cherednikov	(Kazakhstan) Ignat Falkov	T1	3
Ford	Ford 2WD Buggy	(Italy) Two Wheels Drive	(Italy) Eugenio Amos	(France) Sebastien Delaunay	T1	1–2
GAZ	GAZelle NEXT	(Russia) Gaz Raid Sport	(Russia) Evgenii Sukhovenko	(Russia) Kirill Chapaev	T1	3
GAZ	GAZelle NEXT	(Russia) Gaz Raid Sport	(Russia) Alexey Ignatov	(Russia) Evgeny Pavlov	T4	3
GAZ	Sadko NEXT	(Russia) Gaz Raid Sport	(Russia) Mikhail Shklyaev	(Russia) Aleksandr Laguta	T4	3
GAZ	Sadko NEXT	(Russia) Gaz Raid Sport	(Russia) Alexey Khlebov	(Russia) Stanislav Dolgov	T4	3
G-Force	Bars	(Russia) Viktor Khoroshavtsev	(Russia) Viktor Khoroshavtsev	(Russia) Anton Nokolaev	T1	3
G-Force	Bars	(Russia) G-Force Motorsport	(Russia) Boris Gadasin	(Russia) Dmitry Pavlov	T1	3
Hummer	H3 Evo VIII	(Kazakhstan) Mobilex Racing Team	(Kazakhstan) Yuriy Sazanov	(Kazakhstan) Yitaliy Yevtyekhov	T1	3
Iveco	Iveco PowerStar	(Czech Republic) Big Shock Racing	(Czech Republic) Martin Macik	(Czech Republic) Frantisek Tomasek	T4	4
Iveco	Iveco PowerStar	(Czech Republic) Valtr Racing Team	(Czech Republic) Jaroslav Valtr Sr	(Czech Republic) Jaroslav Valtr Jr	T4	4
Jeep	Jeep Wrangler	(Oman) AZ Racing Team	(Oman) Zubair Al Zubair	(Oman) Faisal Al Raisi	T1	2
Kamaz	43509	(Russia) Kamaz Master Team	(Russia) Eduard Nikolaev	(Russia) Evgeny Yakovlev	T4	3
Kamaz	43509	(Russia) Kamaz Master Team	(Russia) Dmitry Sotnikov	(Russia) Ruslan Akhmadeev	T4	3
Mercedes-Benz	Mercedes Unimog Truck	(Saudi Arabia) Ibrahim Al Muhana	(Saudi Arabia) Ibrahim Al Muhana	(Saudi Arabia) Osama Alsanad	T4	1–2
Mini	Mini JCW Rally X-Raid	(Poland) Orlen Team/X-Raid	(Poland) Jakub Pryzgonski	(Germany) Timo Gottschalk	T1	1, 3–4
Mini	Mini JCW Rally X-Raid	(Saudi Arabia) Yasir Hamad Seaidn	(Saudi Arabia) Yasir Hamad Seaidn	(France) Laurent Lichtleuchter	T1	1
Mini	Mini JCW Rally X-Raid	(Germany) X-Raid Mini JCW Team	(France) Stephane Peterhansel	(Germany) Andrea Peterhansel	T1	2
Mini	Mini JCW Rally X-Raid	(Germany) X-Raid Mini JCW Team	(Chile) Boris Garafulic	(Portugal) Felipe Palmeiro	T1	3–4
Mini	Mini JCW Rally X-Raid	(Russia) MSK Rally Team	(Russia) Denis Krotov	(Russia) Dmytrio Tsyro	T1	3–4
Mini	Mini JCW Rally X-Raid	Auto Sport Federation of Turkmenistan	(Turkmenistan) Gurbanberdi Danatarov	(Turkmenistan) Rafael Gaynulin	T1	3
Mini	Mini JCW Rally X-Raid	(Russia) VRT	(Russia) Vladimir Vasilyev	(Russia) Konstantin Zhiltsov	T1	3
Mini	Mini JCW Buggy X-Raid	(Poland) Orlen Team/X-Raid	(Poland) Jakub Przygoński	(Germany) Timo Gottschalk	T1	2
Mini	Mini JCW Buggy X-Raid	(Germany) X-Raid Mini JCW Team	(France) Cyril Despres	(Spain) Daniel Oliveras	T1	2
Mini	Mini JCW Buggy X-Raid	(Germany) X-Raid Mini JCW Team	(France) Stephane Peterhansel	(Germany) Andrea Peterhansel	T1	3–4
Mini	Mini JCW Buggy X-Raid	(Germany) X-Raid Mini JCW Team	(Spain) Carlos Sainz	(Spain) Lucas Cruz	T1	4
Mini	Mini All4 Racing	(Germany) X-Raid Mini JCW Team	(Germany) Stephen Schott	(Portugal) Felipe Palmeiro	T1	2
Mini	Mini All4 Racing	(Saudi Arabia) Yasir Hamad Seaidn	(Saudi Arabia) Yasir Hamad Seaidn	(France) Paulo Fiuza	T1	4
Nissan	Nissan Navara	Saudi Arabia Racing Team	(Saudi Arabia) Yasir Hamad Seaidn	(United Arab Emirates) Ariff Mohammed	T1	2
Nissan	Nissan Navara	(United Arab Emirates) Sabertooth Motoring Adventure	(United Arab Emirates) Thomas Bell	(United Arab Emirates) Patrick McMurren	T1	2
Nissan	Nissan Navara	(Saudi Arabia) ED Racing Team	(Saudi Arabia) Essa Al Dossery	(United Arab Emirates) Ali Hassan Obaid	T1	2
Nissan	Nissan Navara	(United Arab Emirates) Yahya Al Helei	(United Arab Emirates) Yahya Al Helei	(United Arab Emirates) Khalid Alkendi	T1	2
Nissan	Nissan Pathfinder	(Egypt) Yara Shalaby	(Egypt) Yara Shalaby	(Jordan) Ala Eshtaiwai	T1	2
Nissan	Nissan Patrol	(Qatar) Mohammed Al-Meer	(Qatar) Mohammed Al-Meer	(Russia) Alexey Kuzmich	T2	2
Nissan	Nissan Patrol	(Qatar) QMMF Team	(Qatar) Mohammed Saad Al Harqan	(France) Sebastien Delaunay	T2	1
Nissan	Nissan Patrol	(Qatar) QMMF Team	(Qatar) Abdullah Najeeb Al Baker	(France) Mohammed Abuhassan	T2	1
Nissan	Nissan Patrol	(Kazakhstan) Aktau Motorsport	(Kazakhstan) Kirill Chernenkov	(Kazakhstan) Alexey Mun	T2	3
Nissan	Nissan Patrol	Auto Sport Federation of Turkmenistan	(Turkmenistan) Muhammetmyrat Gurbanov	(Turkmenistan) Shamyrat Gurbanov	T2	3
Nissan	Nissan Patrol Pickup	(Saudi Arabia) Khaled Alferaihi	(Saudi Arabia) Khaled Alferaihi	(Saudi Arabia) Wleed Suleman Alfiuam	T1	1–2
Peugeot	Peugeot 3008 DKR	(United Arab Emirates) Abu Dhabi Racing	(United Arab Emirates) Khalid Al Qassimi	(France) Xavier Panseri	T1	2
Polaris	Polaris RZR 1000 XP	(Spain) Jose Luis Pena Campo	(Spain) Jose Luis Pena Campo	(Spain) Rafael Tornabell	T3	2–4
Polaris	Polaris RZR 1000 XP	(United Arab Emirates) Michel Fadel	(United Arab Emirates) Michel Fadel	(United Arab Emirates) Craig Tyson	T3	1–2
Polaris	Polaris RZR 1000 XP	(Italy) CR Racing	(Italy) Michele Cinotto	(Italy) Marco Arnoletti	T3	1–3
Polaris	Polaris RZR 1000 XP	(Romania) Claudiu Barbu	(Romania) Claudiu Barbu	(Romania) Paul Spiridon	T3	1
Polaris	Polaris RZR 1000 XP	(Qatar) QMMF Team	(Qatar) Khalid Faraj Al Mohannadi	(France) Loic Minaudier	T3	1
Polaris	Polaris RZR 1000 XP	(Qatar) QMMF Team	(Qatar) Rashid Juma Al Mohannadi	(Kuwait) Ahmad Alfares	T3	1
Polaris	Polaris RZR 1000 XP	(Qatar) QMMF Team	(Qatar) Mubarak Khalifa Alkhelaifi	(Poland) Szymon Gospodarczk	T3	1
Polaris	Polaris RZR 1000 XP	(Russia) Dmitrii Ponomarenko	(Russia) Dmitrii Ponomarenko	(Russia) Dmitrii Karpov	T3	3
Predator	Predator X Buggy	(United Arab Emirates) Saluki Motorsport	(Australia) Matthew Telling	(New Zealand) James Bourke	T1	1–2
SMG	SMG Buggy	(Qatar) Mohammed Abu Issa	(Qatar) Mohammed Abu Issa	(France) Xavier Panseri	T1	1
Snag	Snag Proto	(Russia) Snag Racing Team	(Russia) Sergei Kariakin	(Russia) Anton Vlasiuk	T3	4
Snag	Snag Proto	(Russia) Snag Racing Team	(Russia) Aleksei Shmotev	(Belgium) Andrei Rudnitski	T3	4
Toyota	Toyota Hilux	(South Africa) Toyota Gazoo Racing	(Qatar) Nasser Al-Attiyah	(France) Mathieu Baumel	T1	1, 3–4
Toyota	Toyota Hilux	(South Africa) Toyota Gazoo Racing	(Netherlands) Bernhard ten Brinke	(Belgium) Tom Colsoul	T1	1–4
Toyota	Toyota Hilux	(South Africa) Toyota Gazoo Racing	(Saudi Arabia) Yazeed Al-Rajhi	(Germany) Dirk von Zitzewitz	T1	1–4
Toyota	Toyota Hilux	(South Africa) Toyota Gazoo Racing	(South Africa) Giniel De Villiers	(Spain) Alex Haro	T1	4
Toyota	Toyota Hilux	(South Africa) Toyota Gazoo Racing	(Spain) Fernando Alonso	(Spain) Marc Coma	T1	4
Toyota	Toyota Hilux	(Belgium) Overdrive Racing	(Netherlands) Erik van Loon	(France) Sebastien Delaunay	T1	4
Toyota	Toyota Hilux	(Belgium) Overdrive Racing	(Poland) Aron Domzala	(Poland) Maciej Marton	T1	2
Toyota	Toyota Hilux	(Belgium) Overdrive Racing	(Russia) Viktor Khoroshavtsev	(Russia) Anton Nikolaev	T1	4
Toyota	Toyota Hilux	(Belgium) Overdrive Racing	(France) Ronan Chabot	(France) Gilles Pillot	T1	4
Toyota	Toyota Hilux	(Spain) 4WD Jaton Racing	(Colombia) Antonio Leonidas Marmolejo	(Spain) Eduardo Blanco	T1	2
Toyota	Toyota Hilux	(Kazakhstan) Mobilex Racing Team	(Kazakhstan) Yerden Shagirov	(Kazakhstan) Arslan Sakhimov	T1	3
Toyota	Toyota Land Cruiser 200	(Latvia) VA Motorsports	(Latvia) Aldis Vilcans	(Latvia) Janis Stepanovis	T2	2
Toyota	Toyota Land Cruiser 200	(Latvia) VA Motorsports	(Russia) Alexander Baranenko	(Russia) Alexander Gorkov	T2	2
Toyota	Toyota Land Cruiser 200	(Qatar) QMMF Team	(Qatar) Mohammed Al-Meer	(Russia) Alexey Kuzmich	T2	1, 3–4
Toyota	Toyota Land Cruiser 200	Auto Sport Federation of Turkmenistan	(Turkmenistan) Guvanchmyrat Hommadov	(Turkmenistan) Serdar Mollamyradov	T2	3
Toyota	Toyota Land Cruiser 200	(Poland) Tomasz Baranowski	(Poland) Tomasz Baranowski	(Poland) Grzegorz Konczak	T2	4
Yamaha	Yamaha YXZ 1000R	(Italy) Camelia Liparoti	(Italy) Camelia Liparoti	(Spain) Rosa Romero	T3	1–2, 4

== Results ==
=== Overall ===
Round	Rally name	Podium finishers			
Round	Rally name	Rank	Driver	Car	Time
1	Qatar Cross Country Rally	1	(Qatar) Nasser Al-Attiyah (France) Matthieu Baumel	Toyota Hilux/Overdrive Racing	13:18:44
1	Qatar Cross Country Rally	2	(Saudi Arabia) Yazeed Al-Rajhi (Germany) Dirk von Zitzewitz	Toyota Hilux/Overdrive Racing	13:29:54
1	Qatar Cross Country Rally	3	(Russia) Vladimir Vasilyev (Russia) Konstantin Zhiltsov	BMW X3	14:14:32
2	(United Arab Emirates) Abu Dhabi Desert Challenge	1	(France) Stephane Peterhansel (Germany) Andrea Peterhansel	Mini JCW Rally X-Raid	18:03:45
2	(United Arab Emirates) Abu Dhabi Desert Challenge	2	(United Arab Emirates) Khalid Al Qassimi (France) Xavier Panseri	Peugeot 3008 DKR	18:12:33
2	(United Arab Emirates) Abu Dhabi Desert Challenge	3	(Poland) Aron Domzala (Poland) Maciej Marton	Toyota Hilux/Overdrive Racing	18:50:01
3	Rally Kazakhstan	1	(Qatar) Nasser Al-Attiyah (France) Matthieu Baumel	Toyota Hilux/Overdrive Racing	17:58:06
3	Rally Kazakhstan	2	(France) Stephane Peterhansel (Germany) Andrea Peterhansel	Mini JCW Buggy X-Raid	18:03:27
3	Rally Kazakhstan	3	(Poland) Jakub Przygonski (Germany) Timo Gottschalk	Mini JCW Rally X-Raid	18:45:56
4	(Morocco) Rallye du Maroc	1	(South Africa) Giniel de Villiers (Spain) Alex Haro	Toyota Hilux/Overdrive Racing	17:48:44
4	(Morocco) Rallye du Maroc	2	(Spain) Carlos Sainz (Spain) Lucas Cruz	Mini JCW Buggy X-Raid	18:06:26
4	(Morocco) Rallye du Maroc	3	(Poland) Jakub Przygonski (Germany) Timo Gottschalk	Mini JCW Rally X-Raid	18:47:11

=== T2 category ===
Round	Rally name	Podium finishers			
Round	Rally name	Rank	Driver	Car	Time
1	Qatar Cross Country Rally	1	(Qatar) Mohammed Al-Meer (Russia) Alexey Kuzmich	Toyota Land Cruiser 200	117:09:03
1	Qatar Cross Country Rally	2			
1	Qatar Cross Country Rally	3			
2	(United Arab Emirates) Abu Dhabi Desert Challenge	1	(Qatar) Mohammed Al-Meer (Russia) Alexey Kuzmich	Nissan Patrol	499:59:30
2	(United Arab Emirates) Abu Dhabi Desert Challenge	2	(Latvia) Aldis Vilcans (Latvia) Janis Stepanovis	Toyota Land Cruiser 200	513:59:21
2	(United Arab Emirates) Abu Dhabi Desert Challenge	3	(Russia) Alexander Baranenko (Russia) Alexander Gorkov	Toyota Land Cruiser 200	530:35:27
3	Rally Kazakhstan	1	(Qatar) Mohammed Al-Meer (Russia) Alexey Kuzmich	Toyota Land Cruiser 200	27:22:10
3	Rally Kazakhstan	2	(Turkmenistan) Muhammetmyrat Gurbanov (Turkmenistan) Shamyrat Gurbanov	Nissan Patrol	93:53:29
3	Rally Kazakhstan	3	(Kazakhstan) Kirill Chernenkov (Kazakhstan) Alexey Mun	Nissan Patrol	162:41:58
4	(Morocco) Rallye du Maroc	1	(Poland) Tomasz Baranowski (Poland) Gregorz Konczak	Toyota Land Cruiser KDJ 155	246:50:24
4	(Morocco) Rallye du Maroc	2			
4	(Morocco) Rallye du Maroc	3			

=== T3 category ===
Round	Rally name	Podium finishers			
Round	Rally name	Rank	Driver	Car	Time
1	Qatar Cross Country Rally	1	(Brazil) Reinaldo Varela (Brazil) Gustavo Gugelmin	Can-Am Maverick X3	19:14:08
1	Qatar Cross Country Rally	2	(Russia) Fedor Vorobyev (Russia) Kirill Shubin	Can-Am Maverick X3	21:47:20
1	Qatar Cross Country Rally	3	(Italy) Camelia Liparoti (France) Max Delfino	Yamaha YZX 1000 R	23:05:26
2	(United Arab Emirates) Abu Dhabi Desert Challenge	1	(United States) Casey Currie (France) Laurent Lichtleuchter	Can-Am Maverick X3	19:43:18
2	(United Arab Emirates) Abu Dhabi Desert Challenge	2	(Brazil) Reinaldo Varela (Brazil) Gustavo Souza Gugelmin	Can-Am Maverick X3	19:44:30
2	(United Arab Emirates) Abu Dhabi Desert Challenge	3	(Russia) Fedor Vorobyev (Russia) Kirill Shubin	Can-Am Maverick X3	151:53:41
3	Rally Kazakhstan	1	(Brazil) Reinaldo Varela (Brazil) Gustavo Gugelmin	Can-Am Maverick X3	24:21:22
3	Rally Kazakhstan	2	(Spain) Jose Luis Pena Campo (Spain) Rafael Tornabell	Polaris RZR 1000 XP	25:53:32
3	Rally Kazakhstan	3	(Russia) Maria Oparina (Russia) Lyudmila Petenko	Can-Am Maverick X3	83:03:45
4	(Morocco) Rallye du Maroc	1	(Brazil) Reinaldo Varela (Brazil) Gustavo Gugelmin	Can-Am Maverick X3	20:39:35
4	(Morocco) Rallye du Maroc	2	(Russia) Sergei Kariakin (Russia) Anton Vlasiuk	Snag Proto	20:41:07
4	(Morocco) Rallye du Maroc	3	(Russia) Aleksandr Dorosinskiy (Latvia) Oleg Uperenko	Can-Am Maverick X3	20:49:00

=== T4 category ===
Round	Rally name	Podium finishers			
Round	Rally name	Rank	Driver	Car	Time
1	Qatar Cross Country Rally	1	(Saudi Arabia) Ibrahim Al-Muhana (Saudi Arabia) Osama Alsanad	Mercedes Unimog	119:30:24
1	Qatar Cross Country Rally	2			
1	Qatar Cross Country Rally	3			
2	(United Arab Emirates) Abu Dhabi Desert Challenge	1			
2	(United Arab Emirates) Abu Dhabi Desert Challenge	2			
2	(United Arab Emirates) Abu Dhabi Desert Challenge	3			
3	Rally Kazakhstan	1	(Russia) Dmitry Sotnikov (Russia) Ruslan Akhmadeev	Kamaz 43509	21:31:45
3	Rally Kazakhstan	2	(Russia) Mikhail Shklyaev (Russia) Aleksandr Laguta	GAZ Sadko NEXT	33:44:38
3	Rally Kazakhstan	3	(Russia) Alexey Khlebov (Russia) Stanislav Dolgov	GAZ Sadko NEXT	36:02:44
4	(Morocco) Rallye du Maroc	1	(Czech Republic) Jaroslav Valtr Sr. (Czech Republic) Jaroslav Valtr Jr.	Iveco PowerStar Torpedo	29:36:46
4	(Morocco) Rallye du Maroc	2	(Czech Republic) Martin Macik (Czech Republic) Frantisek Tomasek	Iveco PowerStar Torpedo	100:47:06
4	(Morocco) Rallye du Maroc	3			

== Championship standings ==
In order to score points in the Cup classifications, competitors must register with the FIA before the entry closing date of the first rally entered.

Points system

- Points for final positions are awarded as per the following table:

Position	1st	2nd	3rd	4th	5th	6th	7th	8th	9th	10th
Overall points	25	18	15	12	10	8	6	4	2	1
T1/T2/T3 Points	5	3	1	0						

=== FIA World Cup for Drivers, Co-Drivers, and Teams ===
==== Drivers' & Co-Drivers' championships ====
Pos	Driver	QAT (Qatar)	ABU (United Arab Emirates)	TKM (Turkmenistan)	KAZ (Kazakhstan)	MAR (Morocco)	Points
1	(France) Stéphane Peterhansel		1^{30}	C	2^{21}	4^{12}	63
2	(Qatar) Nasser Al-Attiyah	1^{30}		C	1^{30}		60
3	(Brazil) Reinaldo Marquez Varela	6^{13}	5^{13}	C	8^{9}	7^{11}	46
4	(Saudi Arabia) Yazeed Al-Rajhi	2^{21}		C	7^{6}	5^{10}	37
5	(Poland) Jakub Przygonski			C	3^{16}	3^{16}	32
6	(South Africa) Giniel De Villiers			C		1^{30}	30
7	(Russia) Vladimir Vasilyev	3^{16}	6^{8}	C			24
8	(United Arab Emirates) Khalid Al Qassimi		2^{21}	C			21
9	(Spain) Carlos Sainz			C		2^{21}	21
10	(United States) Casey Currie		4^{17}	C			17
11	(Poland) Aron Domzala		3^{16}	C			16
12	(Czech Republic) Miroslav Zapletal	10^{1}		C	4^{12}		13
13	(Saudi Arabia) Yasir Hamad Seaidan	4^{12}		C			12
14	(Qatar) Mohammed Al Meer	14^{5}		C	10^{6}		11
15	(Russia) Denis Krotov			C	5^{10}		10
16	(Netherlands) Bernhard Ten Brinke	5^{10}		C			10
17	(Russia) Fedor Vorobyev	7^{9}	14^{1}	C			10
18	(Kazakhstan) Andrey Cherednikov			C	6^{8}		8
19	(Spain) Joan “Nani” Roma			C		6^{8}	8
20	(Russia) Sergei Kariakin			C		8^{7}	7
21	(Czech Republic) Martin Prokop		7^{6}	C			6
22	(Italy) Camelia Liparoti	8^{5}		C			5
23	(Spain) Jose-Luis Pena Campo			C	9^{5}		5
24	(Andorra) Cyril Despres		8^{4}	C			4
25	(Russia) Aleksandr Dorosinskiy			C		9^{3}	3
26	(Turkmenistan) Samyrat Gurbanov			C	14^{3}		3
27	(Italy) Eugenio Amos	9^{2}		C			2
28	(United Arab Emirates) Thomas Bell		9^{2}	C			2
29	(United Arab Emirates) Khalid Al Jafla		10^{1}	C			1
30	(United States) Austin Jones			C		10^{1}	1
31	(Russia) Maria Oparina			C	13^{1}		1
32	(Kazakhstan) Kirill Chernenkov			C	17^{1}		1
Pos	Driver	QAT (Qatar)	ABU (United Arab Emirates)	TKM (Turkmenistan)	KAZ (Kazakhstan)	MAR (Morocco)	Points

Pos	Co-Driver	QAT (Qatar)	ABU (United Arab Emirates)	TKM (Turkmenistan)	KAZ (Kazakhstan)	MAR (Morocco)	Points
1	(Germany) Andrea Peterhansel		1^{30}	C	2^{21}	4^{12}	63
2	(France) Matthieu Baumel	1^{30}		C	1^{30}		60
3	(Brazil) Gustavo Souza Gugelmin	6^{13}	5^{13}	C	8^{9}	7^{11}	46
4	(Brazil) Timo Gottschalk			C	3^{16}	3^{16}	32
5	(Spain) Alex Haro			C		1^{30}	30
6	(France) Laurent Lichtleuchter	4^{12}	4^{17}	C			29
7	(Germany) Dirk von Zitzewitz	2^{21}		C	7^{6}		27
8	(Russia) Konstantin Zhiltsov	3^{16}	6^{8}	C			24
9	(Spain) Lucas Cruz			C		2^{21}	21
10	(France) Xavier Panseri		2^{21}	C			21
11	(Poland) Maciej Marton		3^{16}	C			16
12	(Czech Republic) Marek Sykora	10^{1}		C	4^{12}		13
13	(Spain) Daniel Oliveras		8^{4}	C		6^{8}	12
14	(Russia) Alexey Kuzmich	14^{5}		C	10^{6}		11
15	(Belgium) Tom Colsoul	5^{10}		C			10
16	(United Kingdom) Michael Orr			C		5^{10}	10
17	(Kazakhstan) Dmytro Tsyro			C	5^{10}		10
18	(Russia) Kirill Shubin	7^{9}	14^{1}	C			10
19	(Kazakhstan) Ignat Falkov			C	6^{8}		8
20	(Russia) Anton Vlasiuk			C		8^{7}	7
21	(Czech Republic) Viktor Chytka		7^{6}	C			6
22	(France) Max Delfino	8^{5}		C			5
23	(Spain) Rafael Tornabell			C	9^{5}		5
24	(Latvia) Oleg Uperenko			C		9^{3}	3
25	(Turkmenistan) Muhammetmyrat Gurbanov			C	14^{3}		3
26	(France) Sebastien Delaunay	9^{2}		C			2
27	(United Arab Emirates) Patrick McMurren		9^{2}	C			2
28	(Russia) Andrei Rudnitski		10^{1}	C			1
29	(United States) Kellon Walch			C		10^{1}	1
30	(Russia) Lyudmila Petenko			C	13^{1}		1
31	(Kazakhstan) Alexey Mun			C	17^{1}		1
Pos	Co-Driver	QAT (Qatar)	ABU (United Arab Emirates)	TKM (Turkmenistan)	KAZ (Kazakhstan)	MAR (Morocco)	Points

==== Teams' championship ====
Pos	Team	QAT (Qatar)	ABU (United Arab Emirates)	TKM (Turkmenistan)	KAZ (Kazakhstan)	MAR (Morocco)	Points
1	(Germany) X-Raid Mini JCW Team		30	C	21	21	72
2	(Qatar) Nasser Al-Attiyah Team	30		C	30		60
3	(Belgium) Overdrive Racing	21	16	C	8	10	55
4	(Germany) Monster Energy Can-Am	13	17	C	11	11	52
5	(Poland) Orlen X-Raid Team			C	16	16	32
6	(South Africa) Toyota Gazoo Racing			C		30	30
7	(Russia) VRT	16	8	C			24
8	(United Arab Emirates) Abu Dhabi Racing		21	C			21
9	(Russia) MSK Rally Team			C	12		12
10	Saudi Arabia	12		C			12
11	(Russia) Zavidovo Racing Team	9	1	C	1		11
12	Off Road Kazakhstan			C		10	10
13	(Qatar) QMMF Team			C	9		9
14	(Germany) Borgsward Rally Team			C		8	8
15	(Russia) Snag Racing Team			C		7	7
16	(Czech Republic) MP-Sports		6	C			6
17	(Italy) Camelia Liparoti	5		C			5
18	(Latvia) Sports Racing Technologies			C		3	3
19	(Russia) Team Maria Oparina			C	3		3
20	(Russia) GAZ Raid Sport			C	2		2
21	(United Arab Emirates) Sabertooth Motoring		2	C			2
22	Auto Sport Federation of Turkmenistan			C	1		1
23	(Germany) South Racing Can-Am			C		1	1
23	(Kazakhstan) Aktau Motorsport			C	1		1
Pos	Team	QAT (Qatar)	ABU (United Arab Emirates)	TKM (Turkmenistan)	KAZ (Kazakhstan)	MAR (Morocco)	Points

=== FIA T2 Cup for Drivers and Teams ===
Pos	Driver	QAT (Qatar)	ABU (United Arab Emirates)	TKM (Turkmenistan)	KAZ (Kazakhstan)	MAR (Morocco)	Points
1	(Qatar) Mohammed Al-Meer	1^{25}		C	1^{25}		50
2	(Poland) Tomasz Baranowski			C		1^{25}	25
3	(Turkmenistan) Samyrat Gurbanov			C	2^{18}		18
4	(Kazakhstan) Kirill Chernenkov			C	3^{15}		15
5	(Turkmenistan) Guvanchmyrat Hommadov			C	4^{12}		12
Pos	Driver	QAT (Qatar)	ABU (United Arab Emirates)	TKM (Turkmenistan)	KAZ (Kazakhstan)	MAR (Morocco)	Points

Pos	Team	QAT (Qatar)	ABU (United Arab Emirates)	TKM (Turkmenistan)	KAZ (Kazakhstan)	MAR (Morocco)	Points
1	(Qatar) QMMF Team	25		C	25		50
2	(Poland) Tomasz Baranowski			C		25	25
3	Auto Sport Federation of Turkmenistan			C	18		18
4	(Kazakhstan) Aktau Motorsport			C	15		15
Pos	Team	QAT (Qatar)	ABU (United Arab Emirates)	TKM (Turkmenistan)	KAZ (Kazakhstan)	MAR (Morocco)	Points

=== FIA T3 Cup for Drivers and Teams ===
Pos	Driver	QAT (Qatar)	ABU (United Arab Emirates)	TKM (Turkmenistan)	KAZ (Kazakhstan)	MAR (Morocco)	Points
1	(Brazil) Reinaldo Varela	1^{25}	2^{18}	C	1^{25}	1^{25}	93
2	(Russia) Fedor Vorobyev	2^{18}	3^{15}	C	4^{12}	7^{6}	51
3	(Spain) Jose-Luis Pena Campo		7^{6}	C	2^{18}	6^{8}	32
4	(Italy) Camelia Liparoti	3^{15}	4^{12}	C		10^{1}	38
5	(United States) Casey Currie		1^{25}	C			25
6	(Russia) Sergey Karyakin			C		2^{18}	18
7	(Russia) Aleksandr Dorosinskiy			C		3^{15}	15
8	(Russia) Maria Oparina			C	3^{15}		15
9	(Oman) Abdullah Al Zubair	4^{12}		C		9^{2}	14
10	(Chile) Hernan Garces		5^{10}	C		8^{4}	14
11	(Italy) Michele Cinotto	7^{6}	6^{8}	C			14
12	(United States) Austin Jones			C		4^{12}	12
13	(Qatar) Adel Abdulla	5^{10}		C			10
14	(Russia) Aleksei Shmotev			C		5^{10}	10
15	(Qatar) Khalid Faraj Al Mohannadi	6^{8}		C			8
16	(Qatar) Ahmed Alkuwari	8^{4}		C			4
17	(Lebanon) Michel Fadel		8^{4}	C			4
18	(Qatar) Mohammed Al Attiyah	9^{2}		C			2
19	(Qatar) Rashid Juma Al-Mohannadi	10^{1}		C			1
Pos	Driver	QAT (Qatar)	ABU (United Arab Emirates)	TKM (Turkmenistan)	KAZ (Kazakhstan)	MAR (Morocco)	Points

Pos	Team	QAT (Qatar)	ABU (United Arab Emirates)	TKM (Turkmenistan)	KAZ (Kazakhstan)	MAR (Morocco)	Points
1	(Germany) Monster Energy Can-Am	25	25	C	25	25	100
2	(Russia) Zavidovo Racing Team	18	15	C	15	6	54
3	(Italy) Camelia Liparoti	15	12	C		1	28
4	(Germany) South Racing		10	C		12	22
5	(Russia) Snag Racing Team			C		18	18
6	(Russia) Team Maria Oparina			C	18		18
7	(Latvia) Sports Racing Technologies			C		15	15
8	(Oman) AZ Racing Team	12		C		2	14
9	(Italy) CR Racing	6	8	C			14
10	(Spain) Jose Luis Pena Campo		6	C		8	14
11	(Qatar) QMMF Team	10		C			10
12	(United Arab Emirates) Michel Fadel		4	C			4
Pos	Team	QAT (Qatar)	ABU (United Arab Emirates)	TKM (Turkmenistan)	KAZ (Kazakhstan)	MAR (Morocco)	Points
