= 2021 FIA World Cup for Cross-Country Rallies =

2021 FIA World Cup for Cross-Country Rallies
Previous:	2020	Next:	2022 (W2RC)

The 2021 FIA World Cup for Cross-Country Rallies was the 29th and final season of the FIA World Cup for Cross-Country Rallies; an annual competition for rally raid events for cars, buggies, side-by-sides, and trucks held in multiple countries.

== Calendar ==
The initial calendar for the 2021 world cup featured seven cross-country rally events.

Round	Dates	Rally name	Ref.
1	12–16 May	(Spain) Andalucia Rally	
2	7–13 June	Rally Kazakhstan	
3	1–11 July	(Russia) (Mongolia) Silk Way Rally	
-	16–21 September	BP Ultimate Portugal Cross-Country Rally	Cancelled
4	7–13 October	(Morocco) Rallye du Maroc	
5	5–11 November	(United Arab Emirates) Abu Dhabi Desert Challenge	
6	6–11 December	(Saudi Arabia) Hail Rally	

== Teams and drivers ==
T1 Teams & Drivers
Constructor	Car	Team	Driver	Co-driver	Rounds
BMW	BMW X5	VRT	(Russia) Vladimir Vasilyev	(Russia) Alexey Kuzmich	1
Ford	Ford F150 Evo		(Czech Republic) Miroslav Zapletal	(Slovakia) Marek Sykora	2
Mini	Mini John Cooper Works Rally	Agrorodeo	(Lithuania) Vaidotas Žala	(Portugal) Paulo Fiuza	1
Mini	Mini John Cooper Works Rally	MSK Rally Team	(Russia) Denis Krotov	(Russia) Konstantin Zhiltsov	1–3, 5
Mini	Mini John Cooper Works Rally	MSK Rally Team	(Russia) Denis Krotov	(Russia) Konstantin Zhiltsov	4
Mini	Mini John Cooper Works Rally	X-Raid Team	(Spain) Carlos Sainz	(Spain) Lucas Cruz	1
Mini	Mini John Cooper Works Buggy	X-Raid Team	(Sweden) Mattias Ekström	(Sweden) Emil Bergkvist	1–2, 4
Mini	Mini John Cooper Works Buggy	X-Raid Team	(Argentina) Sebastian Halpern	(Argentina) Bernardo Graue	2, 4–5
Mini	Mini John Cooper Works Buggy	X-Raid Team	(Poland) Jakub Przygonski	(Germany) Timo Gottschalk	4–5
Mini	Mini All4 Racing	X-Raid Team	(Spain) Laia Sanz	(Spain) Daniel Oliveras	1
Mini	Mini Cooper Countryman	VRT	(Russia) Vladimir Vasilyev	(Russia) Alexey Kuzmich	2–3
Toyota	Toyota Hilux		(Portugal) João Ferreira	(Portugal) David Monteiro	1
Toyota	Toyota Hilux		(Portugal) João Ferreira	(Portugal) Jorge Monteiro_	4
Toyota	Toyota Hilux	Toyota Gazoo Racing	(Qatar) Nasser Al-Attiyah	(France) Mathieu Baumel	4–5
Toyota	Toyota Hilux Overdrive	Nasser Racing	(Qatar) Nasser Al-Attiyah	(France) Mathieu Baumel	1
Toyota	Toyota Hilux Overdrive	Overdrive SA	(Saudi Arabia) Yazeed Al-Rajhi	(Germany) Dirk von Zitzewitz	1–2
Toyota	Toyota Hilux Overdrive	Overdrive SA	(Saudi Arabia) Yazeed Al-Rajhi	(United Kingdom) Michael Orr	3–5
Toyota	Toyota Hilux Overdrive	Overdrive SA	(Netherlands) Erik Van Loon	(France) Sébastien Delaunay	1
Toyota	Toyota Hilux Overdrive	Overdrive SA	(Argentina) Lucio Alvarez	(Spain) Armand Monleon	2, 4–5
Toyota	Toyota Hilux Overdrive	Overdrive SA	(France) Ronan Chabot	(France) Gilles Pillot	2, 4
Toyota	Toyota Hilux Overdrive	Overdrive SA	(Argentina) Juan Cruz Yacopini	(Argentina) Alejandro Yacopini	2, 4
T3 Teams & Drivers
Constructor	Car	Team	Driver	Co-driver	Rounds
Can-Am	Can-Am Maverick XRS	Sibirsde	(Russia) Evgeny Frezorger	(Russia) Alexey Shpuk	3
Can-Am	Can-Am Maverick XRS	South Racing	(Spain) Fernando Álvarez	(Spain) Antonio Gimeno	1–2
Can-Am	Can-Am Maverick XRS	South Racing	(Spain) Fernando Álvarez	(France) Laurent Lichtleuter	3
Can-Am	Can-Am Maverick XRS	South Racing	(Spain) Fernando Álvarez	(France) Xavier Panseri	4–5
Can-Am	Can-Am Maverick XRS	South Racing	(Germany) Annett Fischer	(Portugal) Filipe Palmeiro	2
Can-Am	Can-Am Maverick X3 XRS		(Germany) Annett Fischer	(Portugal) Manuel Porém	1
Can-Am	Can-Am Maverick X3 XRS	X-Raid Team	(Germany) Annett Fischer	(Brazil) Lorival Roldan	5
Can-Am	Can-Am T3RR		(France) Jean-Pascal Besson	(France) Patrice Roissac	1
Can-Am	Can-Am T3RR		(France) Jean-Pascal Besson	(France) Sebastien Delaunay	2
Can-Am	Can-Am T3RR		(France) Jean-Pascal Besson	(France) Max Delfino	3
Can-Am	Can-Am Maverick X3 Turbo R	C.A. Herrador Competicion	(Spain) Roberto Rodriguez	(Spain) Herman Rodriguez	1
Can-Am	Can-Am Maverick X3	Team Maria Oparina	(Uzbekistan) Anvar Ergashev	(Russia) Andrei Rudnitski	2, 4
Can-Am	Can-Am Maverick X3	FN Speed Team	(Colombia) Javier Velez	(Colombia) Mateo Moreno	4
Can-Am	Can-Am Maverick X3		(France) Matthieu Margaillan	(France) Max Delfino	4
Can-Am	Can-Am Maverick	MSK Rally Team	(Russia) Pavel Lebedev	(Russia) Kirill Shubin	2–5
Can-Am	Can-Am Maverick	South Racing Middle East	(Saudi Arabia) Saleh Alsaif	(Russia) Egor Okhotikov	5
Can-Am	Can-Am Maverick	South Racing Middle East	(United Arab Emirates) Thomas Bell	(Argentina) Bruno Jacomy	5
Can-Am	Can-Am Maverick	EKS - South Racing	(Sweden) Sebastian Eriksson	(Spain) Oriol Mena	5
G-Force	G-Force T3GF	G-Force Motorsport	(Russia) Andrey Novikov	(Russia) Vladimir Novikov	2
G-Force	G-Force T3GF	G-Force Motorsport	(Russia) Boris Gadasin	(Russia) Dmitrii Kozhukhov	2
Herrator	Herrator Inzane X3	C.A. Herrador Competicion	(Spain) Eduardo Eslava	(Spain) Laura Diaz	1
OT3	OT3	Red Bull Off Road Junior Team	(Spain) Cristina Gutiérrez	(France) François Cazalet	1–2, 4–5
OT3	OT3	Red Bull Off Road Junior Team	(United States) Mitchell Guthrie	(Norway) Ola Fløene	1
OT3	OT3	Red Bull Off Road Junior Team	(United States) Seth Quintero	(Germany) Dennis Zenz	1, 4
OT3	OT3	Red Bull Off Road Junior Team	(Belgium) Guillaume De Mévius	(Belgium) Tom Colsoul	1–2
PH-Sport	PH-Sport Zephyr		(France) Lionel Costes	(France) Christophe Tressens	1, 4
PH-Sport	PH-Sport Zephyr	PH-Sport	(France) Jean-Luc Pisson	(Belgium) Nicolas Gilsoul	1
PH-Sport	PH-Sport Zephyr	PH-Sport	(France) Jean-Luc Pisson	(France) Jean Brucy	3
PH-Sport	PH-Sport Zephyr	PH-Sport	(France) Jean-Luc Pisson	(France) Cedric Duple	4
Polaris	Polaris RZR Pro XP		(Spain) Jose Luis Pena Campo	(Spain) Rafael Tornabell	1–5
Polaris	Polaris RZR Pro XP		(Italy) Enrico Gaspari	(Italy) Massimo Salvatore	1, 4
Polaris	Polaris RZR Pro XP		(Italy) Enrico Gaspari	(Italy) Massimo Salvatore	2–3
Polaris	Polaris RZR Pro XP		(Japan) Shinsuke Umeda	(France) Sebastien Delaunay	3
Yamaha	Yamaha YXZ1000R	X-Raid Yamaha Racing Rally Supported Team	(France) Eric De Seynes	(Italy) Camelia Liparoti	1
T4 Teams & Drivers
Constructor	Car	Team	Driver	Co-driver	Rounds
Can-Am	Can-Am Maverick XRS	Monster Energy Can-Am	(United States) Austin Jones	(Brazil) Gustavo Gugelmin	1–3
Can-Am	Can-Am Maverick XRS	Monster Energy Can-Am	(Poland) Aron Domżała	(Poland) Maciej Marton	1
Can-Am	Can-Am Maverick XRS	South Racing	(Poland) Aron Domżała	(Poland) Maciej Marton	4–5
Can-Am	Can-Am Maverick XRS	South Racing	(Qatar) Khalifa Al-Attiyah	(France) Xavier Panseri	1
Can-Am	Can-Am Maverick XRS	South Racing	(Netherlands) Kees Koolen	(Netherlands) Mirjam Pol	1–5
Can-Am	Can-Am Maverick XRS	South Racing	(Chile) Hernan Garces	(Chile) Juan Pablo Latrach	1, 4
Can-Am	Can-Am Maverick XRS	South Racing	(Argentina) David Zille	(Argentina) Bruno Jacomy	1
Can-Am	Can-Am Maverick XRS	South Racing	(Chile) Lucas del Rio	(Chile) Marcello Scola	1, 4
Can-Am	Can-Am Maverick XRS	South Racing	(Netherlands) Andre Thewessen	(Netherlands) Stijn Bastings	1
Can-Am	Can-Am Maverick XRS	South Racing	(Italy) Eugenio Amos	(Italy) Paolo Ceci	2–5
Can-Am	Can-Am Maverick XRS	South Racing	(Argentina) Diego Martinez	(Argentina) Santiago Hansen	2
Can-Am	Can-Am Maverick XRS	South Racing	(Brazil) Rodrigo Luppi De Oliveira	(Brazil) Maykel Justo	4–5
Can-Am	Can-Am Maverick XRS	South Racing	(Lithuania) Rokas Baciuska	(Spain) Oriol Mena	4
Can-Am	Can-Am Maverick XRS	South Racing	(United States) Austin Jones	(Brazil) Gustavo Gugelmin	4–5
Can-Am	Can-Am Maverick XRS	South Racing	(Portugal) Lourenço Rosa	(Spain) Antonio Gimeno	4
Can-Am	Can-Am Maverick XRS	South Racing	(Australia) Molly Taylor	(Australia) Dale Moscatt	5
Can-Am	Can-Am Maverick XRS	South Racing	(Poland) Michał Goczał	(Poland) Szymon Gospodarczyk	5
Can-Am	Can-Am Maverick XRS	Energylandia Rally Team	(Poland) Marek Goczał	(Poland) Rafał Marton	4
Can-Am	Can-Am Maverick XRS	Energylandia Rally Team	(Poland) Marek Goczał	(Poland) Lukasz Laskawiec	5
Can-Am	Can-Am Maverick XRS	Energylandia Rally Team	(Poland) Michał Goczał	(Poland) Szymon Gospodarczyk	4
Can-Am	Can-Am Maverick X3	FN Speed Team	(Spain) Jordi Segura	(Spain) Marc Solà	1
Can-Am	Can-Am Maverick X3	FN Speed Team	(Spain) Jordi Segura	(Spain) Jaume Aregall	4
Can-Am	Can-Am Maverick X3		(France) Matthieu Margaillan	(France) Axelle Roux-Decima	1, 3
Can-Am	Can-Am Maverick	South Racing Middle East	(United Arab Emirates) Mansour Al Helei	(United Arab Emirates) Abdulla Dakhan	5
Polaris	Polaris RZR Pro XP	Marco Piana	(Argentina) Nazareno Lopez	(Argentina) Ricardo Torlaschi	1
Polaris	Polaris RZR Pro XP		(France) Jean-Claude Pla	(France) Jerome Pla	1

Key
Non-registered competitors

== Results ==
=== Overall ===
Round	Rally name	Podium finishers			
Round	Rally name	Rank	Driver	Car	Time
1	(Spain) Andalucía Rally	1	(Qatar) Nasser Al-Attiyah (France) Matthieu Baumel	Toyota Hilux Overdrive	10:22:49
1	(Spain) Andalucía Rally	2	(Spain) Carlos Sainz (Spain) Lucas Cruz	Mini John Cooper Works Rally	10:23:32
1	(Spain) Andalucía Rally	3	(Saudi Arabia) Yazeed Al Rajhi (Germany) Dirk von Zitzewitz	Toyota Hilux Overdrive	10:34:15
2	Rally Kazakhstan	1	(Argentina) Lucio Alvarez (Spain) Armand Monleon	Toyota Hilux Overdrive	16:03:17
2	Rally Kazakhstan	2	(Russia) Denis Krotov (Russia) Konstantin Zhilstov	Mini John Cooper Works Rally	16:31:42
2	Rally Kazakhstan	3	(Sweden) Mattias Ekstörm (Sweden) Emil Bergkvist	Mini John Cooper Works Rally	16:38:21
3	(Russia) (Mongolia) Silk Way Rally	1	(France) Guerlain Chicherit (France) Alexandre Winocq	Century CR6	7:03:09
3	(Russia) (Mongolia) Silk Way Rally	2	(Russia) Denis Krotov (Russia) Konstantin Zhilstov	Mini John Cooper Works Rally	7:12:21
3	(Russia) (Mongolia) Silk Way Rally	3	(France) Jérome Pelichet (France) Pascal Larroque	Optimus	7:25:33
4	(Morocco) Rallye du Maroc	1	(Qatar) Nasser Al-Attiyah (France) Matthieu Baumel	Toyota Hilux Overdrive	15:52:10
4	(Morocco) Rallye du Maroc	2	(Saudi Arabia) Yazeed Al Rajhi (United Kingdom) Michael Orr	Toyota Hilux Overdrive	16:08:08
4	(Morocco) Rallye du Maroc	3	(Argentina) Lucio Alvarez (Spain) Armand Monleon	Toyota Hilux Overdrive	17:03:02
5	(United Arab Emirates) Abu Dhabi Desert Challenge	1	(Qatar) Nasser Al-Attiyah (France) Matthieu Baumel	Toyota Hilux Overdrive	17:45:58
5	(United Arab Emirates) Abu Dhabi Desert Challenge	2	(Argentina) Lucio Alvarez (Spain) Armand Monleon	Toyota Hilux Overdrive	18:07:10
5	(United Arab Emirates) Abu Dhabi Desert Challenge	3	(Russia) Denis Krotov (Russia) Konstantin Zhilstov	Mini John Cooper Works Rally	19:00:21
6	(Saudi Arabia) Hail Rally	1	(Qatar) Nasser Al-Attiyah (France) Matthieu Baumel	Toyota Hilux	10:50:23
6	(Saudi Arabia) Hail Rally	2	(Russia) Dennis Krotov (Russia) Konstantin Zhiltsov	Mini John Cooper Works Rally	11:12:14
6	(Saudi Arabia) Hail Rally	3	(Argentina) Sebastian Halpern (Argentina) Bernardo Graue	Mini John Cooper Works Buggy	11:19:07

=== T3 ===
Round	Rally name	Podium finishers			
Round	Rally name	Rank	Driver	Car	Time
1	(Spain) Andalucía Rally	1	(Spain) Cristina Gutierrez (France) François Cazalet	OT3	11:07:59
1	(Spain) Andalucía Rally	2	(France) Lionel Baud (France) Loic Minauder	PH-Sport Zephyr	11:32:01
1	(Spain) Andalucía Rally	3	(France) Jean-Luc Pisson (Belgium) Nicolas Gilsoul	PH-Sport Zephyr	12:15:01
2	Rally Kazakhstan	1	(Spain) Cristina Gutierrez (France) François Cazalet	OT3	18:12:33
2	Rally Kazakhstan	2	(Spain) Fernando Alvarez (Spain) Antonio Gimeno	Can-Am Maverick	18:53:36
2	Rally Kazakhstan	3	(Russia) Pavel Lebedev (Russia) Kirill Shubin	Can-Am Maverick	19:03:52
3	(Russia) (Mongolia) Silk Way Rally	1	(France) Jean-Luc Pisson (France) Jean Brucy	PH-Sport Zephyr	7:53:06
3	(Russia) (Mongolia) Silk Way Rally	2	(Russia) Pavel Lebedev (Russia) Kirill Shubin	Can-Am Maverick	8:04:56
3	(Russia) (Mongolia) Silk Way Rally	3	(Russia) Pavel Silnov (Russia) Evgeny Zagorodniuk	Can-Am Maverick	8:27:42
4	(Morocco) Rallye du Maroc	1	(Russia) Pavel Lebedev (Russia) Kirill Shubin	Can-Am Maverick	19:20:36
4	(Morocco) Rallye du Maroc	2	(Spain) Fernando Alvarez (France) Xavier Panseri	Can-Am Maverick XRS	19:27:35
4	(Morocco) Rallye du Maroc	3	(Spain) Jose Luis Pena Campo (Spain) Rafael Tornabell	Polaris RZR Pro XP	20:40:46
5	(United Arab Emirates) Abu Dhabi Desert Challenge	1	(Saudi Arabia) Saleh Alsaif (Russia) Egor Okhotnikov	Can-Am Maverick	20:11:42
5	(United Arab Emirates) Abu Dhabi Desert Challenge	2	(Spain) Cristina Gutiérrez (France) François Cazalet	OT3	20:59:08
5	(United Arab Emirates) Abu Dhabi Desert Challenge	3	(Spain) Fernando Alvarez (France) Xavier Panseri	Can-Am Maverick	39:12:42
6	(Saudi Arabia) Hail Rally	1			
6	(Saudi Arabia) Hail Rally	2			
6	(Saudi Arabia) Hail Rally	3			

=== T4 ===
Round	Rally name	Podium finishers			
Round	Rally name	Rank	Driver	Car	Time
1	(Spain) Andalucía Rally	1	(United States) Austin Jones (Brazil) Gustavo Gugelmin	Can-Am Maverick XRS	11:31:08
1	(Spain) Andalucía Rally	2	(Qatar) Khalifa Al-Attiyah (France) Xavier Panseri	Can-Am Maverick XRS	11:44:32
1	(Spain) Andalucía Rally	3	(Netherlands) Kees Koolen (Netherlands) Mirjam Pol	Can-Am Maverick XRS	12:01:57
2	Rally Kazakhstan	1	(United States) Austin Jones (Brazil) Gustavo Gugelmin	Can-Am Maverick XRS	17:57:22
2	Rally Kazakhstan	2	(Italy) Eugenio Amos (Italy) Paolo Ceci	Can-Am Maverick XRS	18:27:58
2	Rally Kazakhstan	3	(Netherlands) Kees Koolen (Netherlands) Mirjam Pol	Can-Am Maverick XRS	20:07:03
3	(Russia) (Mongolia) Silk Way Rally	1	(Russia) Sergey Karyakin (Russia) Anton Vlasiuk	Can-Am Maverick XRS	7:45:00
3	(Russia) (Mongolia) Silk Way Rally	2	(France) Mathieu Margaillan (France) Axelle Roux-Decima	Can-Am Maverick XRS	8:24:38
4	(Morocco) Rallye du Maroc	1	(Poland) Aron Domżała (Poland) Maciej Marton	Can-Am Maverick XRS	18:12:12
4	(Morocco) Rallye du Maroc	2	(Brazil) Rodrigo Luppi De Oliveira (Brazil) Maykel Justo	Can-Am Maverick XRS	18:19:06
4	(Morocco) Rallye du Maroc	3	(Italy) Eugenio Amos (Italy) Paolo Ceci	Can-Am Maverick XRS	18:26:01
5	(United Arab Emirates) Abu Dhabi Desert Challenge	1	(United States) Austin Jones (Brazil) Gustavo Gugelmin	Can-Am Maverick XRS	19:29:24
5	(United Arab Emirates) Abu Dhabi Desert Challenge	2	(Poland) Marek Goczał (Poland) Lukasz Laskawiec	Can-Am Maverick XRS	19:41:02
5	(United Arab Emirates) Abu Dhabi Desert Challenge	3	(Poland) Aron Domżała (Poland) Maciej Marton	Can-Am Maverick XRS	19:45:16
6	(Saudi Arabia) Hail Rally	1			
6	(Saudi Arabia) Hail Rally	2			
6	(Saudi Arabia) Hail Rally	3			

== Championship standings ==
Points system

- Points for final positions are awarded as per the following table:

Position	1st	2nd	3rd	4th	5th	6th	7th	8th	9th	10th
Overall points	25	18	15	12	10	8	6	4	2	1
Leg Points	1.5	1	.5	0						

Drivers and teams must be registered with the FIA to score points.

=== FIA World Cup for Drivers, Co-Drivers, and Teams ===
==== Drivers' & Co-Drivers' championships ====
Pos	Driver	ESP (Spain)	KAZ (Kazakhstan)	RUS (Russia)	MOR (Morocco)	UAE (United Arab Emirates)	SAU (Saudi Arabia)	Points
1	(Qatar) Nasser Al-Attiyah	1^{29}			1^{32}	1^{31.5}	1^{30.5}	123
2	(Argentina) Lucio Alvarez		1^{27}		3^{15}	2^{22.5}	5^{11}	75.5
3	(Russia) Denis Krotov	11	2^{18.5}	2^{10}	6	3^{15.5}	2^{19}	63
4	(Saudi Arabia) Yazeed Al-Rajhi	3^{17}	17^{4.5}	Ret	2^{22.5}	4^{13}	Ret	57
5	(Argentina) Sebastian Halpern		18		5^{10}	5^{10}	3^{15.5}	35.5
6	(Sweden) Mattias Ekström	5^{10}	3^{17}		Ret			27
7	(France) Ronan Chabot		4^{12.5}		4^{12.5}			25
8	(Spain) Carlos Sainz	2^{22}						22
9	(United States) Austin Jones	12	5^{10}	Ret	14	6^{8}		18
10	(Poland) Jakub Przygoński				26^{3}	18^{2.5}	6^{11}	16.5
11	(Spain) Cristina Gutiérrez	7^{6}	6^{8}		40	12		14
12	(Russia) Vladimir Vasilyev	Ret	Ret	Ret			4^{13}	13
13	(Netherlands) Erik Van Loon	4^{12}						12
14	(Poland) Aron Domżała	57			7^{6}	8^{6}		12
15	(Lithuania) Vaidotas Žala	6^{10}						10
16	(Italy) Eugenio Amos		7^{6}	Ret	9^{2}	11^{1}		9
17	(Spain) Laia Sanz	8^{4}					8^{4}	8
18	(France) Jean-Luc Pisson	22		5^{7}	Ret			7
19	(Russia) Pavel Lebedev		9^{2}	6^{5}	18	Ret		7
20	(Poland) Marek Goczał				15	7	7^{6}	6
21	(France) Matthieu Margaillan	Ret		7^{5}	Ret			5
22	(United Arab Emirates) Mansour Al Helei					9^{4}		4
23	(Spain) Fernando Álvarez	25	8^{4}	Ret	19	17		4
24	(Brazil) Rodrigo Luppi De Oliveira				8^{4}	15		4
25	(Spain) Jose Luis Pena Campo	37	11	9^{3}	27	Ret		3
26	(France) Jean-Pascal Besson	33	Ret	11^{3}				3
27	(Czech Republic) Miroslav Zapletal		23^{0.5}				9^{2}	2.5
28	(Japan) Shinsuke Umeda			15^{2}				2
29	(Saudi Arabia) Saleh Al-Saif					10^{2}		2
30	(Portugal) João Ferreira	9^{2}			43			2
31	(Russia) Evgeny Frezorger			19^{1}				1
32	(Germany) Annett Fischer	47	10^{1}			20		1
33	(Australia) Molly Taylor					16	10^{1}	1
34	(Argentina) Juan Cruz Yacopini		Ret		10^{1}			1
Pos	Driver	ESP (Spain)	KAZ (Kazakhstan)	RUS (Russia)	MOR (Morocco)	UAE (United Arab Emirates)	SAU (Saudi Arabia)	Points

Pos	Driver	ESP (Spain)	KAZ (Kazakhstan)	RUS (Russia)	MOR (Morocco)	UAE (United Arab Emirates)	SAU (Saudi Arabia)	Points
1	(France) Mathieu Baumel	1^{29}			1^{32}	1^{31.5}	1^{30.5}	123
2	(Spain) Armand Monleon		1^{27}		3^{15}	2^{22.5}	5^{11}	75.5
3	(Russia) Konstantin Zhiltsov	11	2^{18.5}	2^{10}	6	3^{15.5}	2^{19}	63
4	(United Kingdom) Michael Orr			Ret	2^{22.5}	4^{13}	Ret	35.5
5	(Argentina) Bernardo Graue		18		5^{10}	5^{10}	3^{15.5}	35.5
6	(Sweden) Emil Bergkvist	5^{10}	3^{17}		Ret			27
7	(France) Gilles Pillot		4^{12.5}		4^{12.5}			25
8	(Spain) Lucas Cruz	2^{22}						22
9	(Germany) Dirk von Zitzewitz	3^{17}	17^{4.5}					21.5
10	(Brazil) Gustavo Gugelmin	12	5^{10}	Ret	14	6^{8}		18
11	(Germany) Timo Gottschalk				26^{3}	18^{2.5}	6^{11}	16.5
12	(France) Sébastien Delaunay	4^{12}	Ret	15^{2}				14
13	(France) François Cazalet	7^{6}	6^{8}		40	12		14
14	(Poland) Maciej Marton	57			7^{6}	8^{6}		12
15	(Portugal) Paulo Fiuza	6^{10}						10
16	(Italy) Paulo Ceci		7^{6}	Ret	9^{2}	11^{1}		9
17	(France) Jean Brucy			5^{7}	47			7
18	(Russia) Kirill Shubin		9^{2}	6^{5}	18	Ret		7
19	(United Arab Emirates) Abdulla Dakhan					9^{4}		4
20	(Spain) Antonio Gimeno	25	8^{4}		16			4
21	(Italy) Maurizio Guerini						8^{4}	4
22	(Brazil) Maykel Justo				8^{4}	15		4
23	(Spain) Daniel Oliveras	8^{4}						4
24	(Spain) Rafael Tornabell	37	11	9^{3}	27	Ret		3
25	(France) Max Delfino	19		11^{3}	Ret			3
26	(Portugal) David Monteiro	9^{2}			Ret			2
27	(Russia) Egor Okhotnikov					10^{2}		2
28	(Russia) Alexey Shpuk			19^{1}				1
29	(Australia) Dale Moscatt					16	10^{1}	1
30	(Portugal) Filipe Palmeiro		10^{1}					1
31	(Argentina) Alejandro Miguel Yacopini		Ret		10^{1}			1
Pos	Driver	ESP (Spain)	KAZ (Kazakhstan)	RUS (Russia)	MOR (Morocco)	UAE (United Arab Emirates)	SAU (Saudi Arabia)	Points

==== Teams championships ====
Pos	Team	ESP (Spain)	KAZ (Kazakhstan)	RUS (Russia)	MOR (Morocco)	UAE (United Arab Emirates)	SAU (Saudi Arabia)	Points
1	(Belgium) Overdrive SA	33	37			30	10	110
2	(Germany) X-Raid Team	37	15		24		21	97
3	(Russia) MSK Rally Team		20		25	15	18	78
4	Toyota Gazoo Racing Team				25	25	25	75
5	(Germany) South Racing	3	10			14	4	31
6	(Poland) Energylandia Rally Team				20			20
7	Red Bull Off Road Jr Team	8	8		1	1		18
8	Monster Energy Can-Am	4	10					14
9	(Russia) VRT						12	12
10	(Lithuania) Agrorodeo	10						10
11	South Racing Middle East					6	3	9
12	(Poland) Orlen Team						8	8
13	(France) PH-Sport by GT21			6				6
14	(Russia) Sibirsde			4				4
15	(Russia) Nakusi Racing Team				4			4
16	(Russia) Team Maria Oparina				2			2
17	(Russia) G-Force Motorsport		1					1
Pos	Team	ESP (Spain)	KAZ (Kazakhstan)	RUS (Russia)	MOR (Morocco)	UAE (United Arab Emirates)	SAU (Saudi Arabia)	Points

=== FIA T3 World Cup for Drivers ===
Pos	Driver	ESP (Spain)	KAZ (Kazakhstan)	RUS (Russia)	MOR (Morocco)	UAE (United Arab Emirates)	SAU (Saudi Arabia)	Points
1	(Spain) Cristina Gutiérrez	1^{28.5}	1^{29.5}		8^{11.5}	2^{21}		90.5
2	(Spain) Fernando Álvarez	5^{18.5}	2^{19.5}	Ret	2^{20.5}	3^{18}		76.5
3	(Russia) Pavel Lebedev		3^{18}	2^{7}	1^{28.5}	Ret	5^{11.5}	65
4	(Saudi Arabia) Saleh Al-Saif					1^{30}	1^{30}	60
5	(Germany) Annett Fischer	16^{6}	4^{13}			4^{12.5}	3^{17}	48.5
6	(Spain) Jose Luis Pena Campo	11^{10}	5^{10.5}	4^{5}	3^{15}	Ret		40.5
7	(Saudi Arabia) Mashael AlObaidan						2^{20.5}	20.5
8	(France) Jean-Pascal Besson	9^{12}	Ret	6^{4}				16
9	(France) Eric De Seynes	8^{15}						15
10	(Saudi Arabia) Dania Akeel						8^{13}	13
11	(France) Lionel Costes	22			4^{12.5}			12.5
12	(Sweden) Sebastian Eriksson					5^{11}		11
13	(France) Jean-Luc Pisson	3		1^{10}	Ret			10
14	(Uzbekistan) Anvar Ergashev		Ret		6^{10}			10
15	(Belgium) Guillaume De Mévius	Ret	8^{10}					10
16	(Russia) Andrey Novikov		6^{9.5}					9.5
17	(Italy) Enrico Gaspari	20^{1}	9	Ret	7^{8}			9
18	(United States) Mitchell Guthrie	14^{9}						9
19	(Spain) Eduardo Eslava	17^{4}						4
20	(Russia) Boris Gadasin		10^{4}					4
21	(Colombia) Javier Velez				9^{4}			4
22	(United States) Seth Quintero	23			10^{3.5}			3.5
23	(Japan) Shinsuke Umeda			10^{3}				3
24	(Spain) Roberto Rodriguez	19^{3}						3
Pos	Driver	ESP (Spain)	KAZ (Kazakhstan)	RUS (Russia)	MOR (Morocco)	UAE (United Arab Emirates)	SAU (Saudi Arabia)	Points

=== FIA T4 World Cup for Drivers and Teams ===
==== Drivers' championship ====
Pos	Driver	ESP (Spain)	KAZ (Kazakhstan)	RUS (Russia)	MOR (Morocco)	UAE (United Arab Emirates)	SAU (Saudi Arabia)	Points
1	(United States) Austin Jones	1^{29}	1^{30}	Ret	6^{9.5}	1^{29.5}		98.5
2	(Italy) Eugenio Amos		2^{25}	Ret	3^{16}	5^{14}		55
3	(Netherlands) Kees Koolen	3^{15}	3^{17}	Ret	4^{12}	6^{11}		55
4	(Poland) Aron Domżała	14			1^{28.5}	3^{22}		50.5
5	(Poland) Marek Goczał				7^{7.5}	2	1^{29.5}	37
6	(Brazil) Rodrigo Luppi De Oliveira				2^{20}	8^{8.5}		28.5
7	(Australia) Molly Taylor					9^{6}	2^{21}	27
8	(Qatar) Khalifa Al-Attiyah	2^{20.5}						20.5
9	(United Arab Emirates) Thomas Bell					10^{4}	3^{16}	20
10	(Poland) Michał Goczał				11^{3}	7	4^{15.5}	18.5
11	(United Arab Emirates) Mansour Al Helei					4^{17}		17
12	(Chile) Hernan Garces	4^{12.5}			9^{2}			14.5
13	(Argentina) Diego Martinez		4^{13}					13
14	(Lithuania) Rokas Baciuska				5^{12.5}			12.5
15	(Argentina) David Zille	5^{11}						11
16	(France) Matthieu Margaillan	Ret		1^{10}				10
17	(Chile) Lucas del Rio	9^{8}			10^{1}			9
18	(Argentina) Nazareno Lopez	10^{6}						6
19	(France) Jean-Claude Pla	11^{4}						4
20	(Portugal) Lourenço Rosa				8^{4}			4
21	(Spain) Jordi Segura	12^{2}			Ret			2
22	(Netherlands) Andre Thewessen	13^{1}						1
Pos	Driver	ESP (Spain)	KAZ (Kazakhstan)	RUS (Russia)	MOR (Morocco)	UAE (United Arab Emirates)	SAU (Saudi Arabia)	Points

==== Teams championship ====
Pos	Team	ESP (Spain)	KAZ (Kazakhstan)	RUS (Russia)	MOR (Morocco)	UAE (United Arab Emirates)	SAU (Saudi Arabia)	Points
1	(Germany) South Racing	33	33			43	25	134
2	Monster Energy Can-Am	25	25					50
3	South Racing Middle East					27	18	45
4	(Poland) Energylandia Rally Team				43			43
5	(Russia) Nakusi Racing Team				15			15
6	(Spain) FN Speed Team	12						12
Pos	Team	ESP (Spain)	KAZ (Kazakhstan)	RUS (Russia)	MOR (Morocco)	UAE (United Arab Emirates)	SAU (Saudi Arabia)	Points
