= 2020 FIA World Cup for Cross-Country Rallies =

2020 FIA World Cup for Cross-Country Rallies
Previous:	2019	Next:	2021

The 2020 FIA World Cup for Cross-Country Rallies was set to be the 28th season of the FIA World Cup for Cross-Country Rallies; an annual rally raid competition for cars, buggies, side-by-sides, and trucks held in multiple countries. Due to COVID-19 pandemic all events but one were cancelled, and FIA considered that only one event wasn't enough to award a World title and cancelled the season.

== Calendar ==
The original calendar for the 2020 edition of the world cup featured five events; four cross-country rallies and one cross-country marathon; the Silk Way Rally, which was included for the first time. Four events on the schedule are shared with the 2020 FIM Cross-Country Rallies World Championship; the Qatar round being the only exception.

Round	Dates	Rally name	Ref.
1	22–27 February	Qatar Cross-Country Rally	
Cancelled due to the 2019-20 coronavirus pandemic
Original Date		Rally name	
24-29 May		Rally Kazakhstan	
2-16 July		(Russia) (Kazakhstan) (China) Silk Way Rally	
9-14 October		(Morocco) Rallye du Maroc	
20-26 March		(United Arab Emirates) Abu Dhabi Desert Challenge	

== Regulation Changes ==
Starting with the 2020 season the vehicle classes have been reorganized into the following classifications:

- T1.1 - 4x4 Prototype Cross-Country Vehicles - Petrol and Diesel
- T1.2 - 4x2 Prototype Cross-Country Vehicles - Petrol and Diesel
- T2 - Series Production Cross Country Vehicles
- T3 - Improved Lightweight Prototypes Cross Country Vehicles
- T4 - Improved Lightweight Series Side by Side Cross Country Vehicles
- T5 - Cross Country Trucks

The FIA awards the world cup to drivers, co-drivers, and teams competing in the T1 category; whilst drivers and teams in the T3 and T4 categories are awarded FIA cups. The T2 production class will no longer be awarded an end of season trophy. Likewise, the T5 'truck' category is recognized, but not awarded any end-of-season cup or trophy.

== Notable teams and drivers ==
Constructor	Car	Team	Driver	Co-driver	Category	Rounds
Can-Am	Can-Am Maverick X3	(Russia) Snag Racing	(Russia) Aleksei Shmotev	(Belarus) Andrei Rudnitski	T3	1
Can-Am	Can-Am Maverick X3	(Saudi Arabia) Saleh Alsaif	(Saudi Arabia) Saleh Alsaif	(United Arab Emirates) Ali Hassan Obaid	T3	1
Can-Am	Can-Am Maverick X3	(Qatar) QMMF Team	(Qatar) Ahmed Al-Kuwari	(Italy) Manuel Lucchese	T3	1
Can-Am	Can-Am Maverick X3	(Qatar) QMMF Team	(Qatar) Rashid Al-Mohannadi	(Portugal) Pedro Santos	T3	1
Can-Am	Can-Am Maverick X3	(Qatar) QMMF Team	(Qatar) Mubarak Al-Hajri	(France) Laurent Lichtleuchter	T3	1
Can-Am	Can-Am Maverick X3	(Qatar) QMMF Team	(Qatar) Mohammed Al-Harqan	(Slovakia) Vili Oslaj	T3	1
Can-Am	Can-Am Maverick X3	(Germany) South Racing	(United States) Austin Jones	(Brazil) Gustavo Gugelmin	T3	1
Chevrolet	Chevrolet Buggy	(Qatar) Mohammed Al-Meer	(Qatar) Mohammed Al-Meer	(Ukraine) Dmytro Tsyro	T1	1
G-Force	G-Force T3GF	(Qatar) Adel Abdulla	(Qatar) Adel Abdulla	(France) Jean-Michel Polato	T3	1
Jeep	Jeep	(Qatar) Abdulla Al-Rabban	(Qatar) Abdulla Al-Rabban	(Russia) Igor Chudaykin	T1	1
Nissan	Nissan Patrol	(Saudi Arabia) Khaled Ahmed Alferaihi	(Saudi Arabia) Khaled Ahmed Alferaihi	(Saudi Arabia) Wleed Alfiuam	T1	1
Opel	Opel Grandland X	(Hungary) Balazs Szalay	(Hungary) Balazs Szalay	(Hungary) Laszlo Bunkozci	T1	1
Overdrive	Overdrive OT3	(Russia) Zavidovo Racing Team	(Russia) Fedor Vorobyev	(Russia) Kirill Shubin	T3	1
Overdrive	Overdrive OT3	(Belgium) Overdrive Racing	(Netherlands) Kees Koolen	(Belgium) Sege Bruynkens	T3	1
Polaris	Polaris RZR 1000 Turbo	(Qatar) QMMF Team	(Qatar) Khalid Al-Mohannadi	(France) Sebastien Delaunay	T3	1
Polaris	Polaris RZR 1000 Turbo	(Ecuador) Gonzalo S. Guayasamin	(Ecuador) Gonzalo S. Guayasamin	(Argentina) Ricardo Adrian Torlaschi	T3	1
Toyota	Toyota Hilux	(South Africa) Toyota Gazoo Racing	(Qatar) Nasser Al-Attiyah	(France) Mathieu Baumel	T1	1
Toyota	Toyota Hilux	(Belgium) Overdrive Racing	(Saudi Arabia) Yazeed Al-Rajhi	(United Kingdom) Michael Orr	T1	1
Toyota	Toyota Hilux	(Poland) Orlen Team/Overdrive	(Poland) Jakub Przygoński	(Germany) Timo Gottschalk	T1	1

== Results ==
T2, T4 and T5 categories had no competitors in the only event held.

=== Overall ===
Round	Rally name	Podium finishers			
Round	Rally name	Rank	Driver	Car	Time
1	Qatar Cross Country Rally	1	(Qatar) Nasser Al-Attiyah (France) Mathieu Baumel	Toyota Hilux	11:48:56
1	Qatar Cross Country Rally	2	(Saudi Arabia) Yazeed Al-Rajhi (United Kingdom) Michael Orr	Toyota Hilux	13:20:36
1	Qatar Cross Country Rally	3	(Poland) Jakub Przygoński (Germany) Timo Gottschalk	Toyota Hilux	13:50:19

=== T1 category ===
Round	Rally name	Podium finishers			
Round	Rally name	Rank	Driver	Car	Time
1	Qatar Cross Country Rally	1	(Qatar) Nasser Al-Attiyah (France) Mathieu Baumel	Toyota Hilux	11:48:56
1	Qatar Cross Country Rally	2	(Saudi Arabia) Yazeed Al-Rajhi (United Kingdom) Michael Orr	Toyota Hilux	13:20:36
1	Qatar Cross Country Rally	3	(Poland) Jakub Przygoński (Germany) Timo Gottschalk	Toyota Hilux	13:50:19

=== T3 category ===
Round	Rally name	Podium finishers			
Round	Rally name	Rank	Driver	Car	Time
1	Qatar Cross Country Rally	1	(Qatar) Ahmed Al-Kuwari (Italy) Manuel Lucchese	Can-Am Maverick X3	15:25:09
1	Qatar Cross Country Rally	2	(Qatar) Saleh Alsaif (United Arab Emirates) Ali Hassan Obaid	Can-Am Maverick X3	15:36:06
1	Qatar Cross Country Rally	3	(Qatar) Khalid Al-Mohannadi (France) Sebastien Delaunay	Polaris RZR 1000 Turbo	15:39:30
