= 2020 World Cup =

2020 World Cup may refer to:

== Association football ==
- 2020 FIFA Futsal World Cup
- 2020 FIFA Club World Cup
- 2020 FIFA U-20 Women's World Cup
- 2020 FIFA U-17 Women's World Cup

== Cricket ==
- 2020 ICC T20 World Cup
- 2020 Under-19 Cricket World Cup
- 2020 ICC Women's T20 World Cup
- 2020–22 ICC Cricket World Cup Super League

== Winter sports ==
- 2019–20 FIS Alpine Ski World Cup

== Other sports ==
- 2020 Canoe Slalom World Cup
- 2020 FIA World Cup for Cross-Country Bajas
- 2020 FIA World Cup for Cross-Country Rallies
- 2020 Individual Wrestling World Cup

== See also ==
- 2020 in sports
