= 2013 Rally Sweden =

Motor racing event in Karlstad, Sweden

2013 Rally Sweden 61st Rally Sweden
Round 2 of 13 of the 2013 World Rally Championship
| ← Previous event | Next event → |
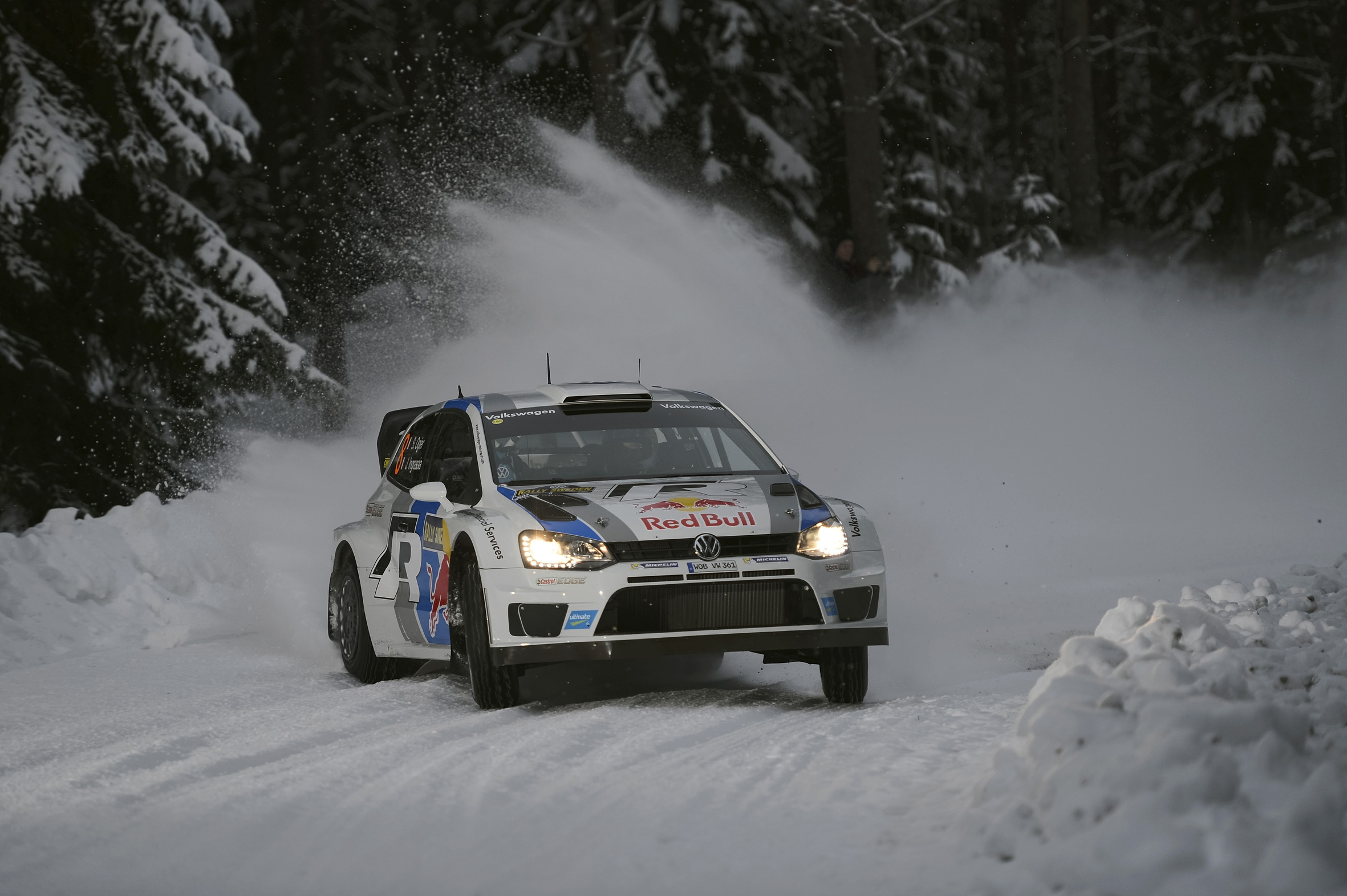
- Sébastien Ogier during Rally
- Host country: Sweden
- Rally base: (Sweden) Karlstad
- Dates run: 7 – 10 February 2013
- Stages: 22 (338.91 km; 210.59 miles)
- Stage surface: Snow and ice

Statistics
- Crews: 43 at start, 35 at finish

Overall results
- Overall winner: (France) Sébastien Ogier (France) Julien Ingrassia (Germany) Volkswagen Motorsport

The 2013 Rally Sweden was a motor racing event for rally cars that was held over four days between 7 and 10 February, which marked the sixty-first running of the Rally Sweden. The rally was based in the town of Karlstad and ran along the border of Norway. The rally itself was contested over twenty-two special stages, covering a total of 338.91 km (210.59 mi) in competitive stages.

The rally was the second round of the 2013 World Rally Championship season, and marked the fortieth anniversary of the World Rally Championship. Twenty World Rally Car crews were entered in the event, including the defending World Drivers' Champion Sébastien Loeb. It was the first World Rally Championship event since the 2005 Rally Japan, 103 races and eight years earlier to be won by a manufacturer other than Citroën or Ford.

== Entry list ==
Twenty World Rally Cars were entered into the event, as were thirteen entries in the newly formed WRC-2 championship for cars built to Group N and Super 2000 regulations. There were no WRC-3 entries.

Notable entrants
| No. | Entrant | Class | Driver | Co-driver | Car | Tyre |
|---|---|---|---|---|---|---|
| 1 | (France) Citroën Total Abu Dhabi WRT | WRC | (France) Sébastien Loeb | (Monaco) Daniel Elena | Citroën DS3 WRC | MI |
| 2 | (France) Citroën Total Abu Dhabi WRT | WRC | (Finland) Mikko Hirvonen | (Finland) Jarmo Lehtinen | Citroën DS3 WRC | MI |
| 4 | (United Kingdom) Qatar M-Sport WRT | WRC | (Norway) Mads Østberg | (Sweden) Jonas Andersson | Ford Fiesta RS WRC | MI |
| 5 | (United Kingdom) Qatar M-Sport WRT | WRC | (Russia) Evgeny Novikov | (Austria) Ilka Minor | Ford Fiesta RS WRC | MI |
| 6 | (United Kingdom) Qatar World Rally Team | WRC | (United Kingdom) Matthew Wilson | (Italy) Giovanni Bernacchini | Ford Fiesta RS WRC | MI |
| 7 | (Germany) Volkswagen Motorsport | WRC | (Finland) Jari-Matti Latvala | (Finland) Miikka Anttila | Volkswagen Polo R WRC | MI |
| 8 | (Germany) Volkswagen Motorsport | WRC | (France) Sébastien Ogier | (France) Julien Ingrassia | Volkswagen Polo R WRC | MI |
| 10 | (France) Abu Dhabi Citroën Total WRT | WRC | (United Arab Emirates) Khalid Al Qassimi | (United Kingdom) Scott Martin | Citroën DS3 WRC | MI |
| 11 | (United Kingdom) Qatar World Rally Team | WRC | (Belgium) Thierry Neuville | (Belgium) Nicolas Gilsoul | Ford Fiesta RS WRC | MI |
| 12 | (Italy) Lotos Team WRC | WRC | (Poland) Michał Kościuszko | (Poland) Maciej Szczepaniak | Mini John Cooper Works WRC | DM |
| 14 | (France) Abu Dhabi Citroën Total WRT | WRC | (Spain) Dani Sordo | (Spain) Carlos del Barrio | Citroën DS3 WRC | MI |
| 15 | (United Kingdom) Qatar World Rally Team | WRC | (Finland) Juho Hänninen | (Finland) Tomi Tuominen | Ford Fiesta RS WRC | MI |
| 16 | (Norway) Henning Solberg | WRC | (Norway) Henning Solberg | (Sweden) Emil Axelsson | Ford Fiesta RS WRC | MI |
| 21 | (Czech Republic) Jipocar Czech National Team | WRC | (Czech Republic) Martin Prokop | (Czech Republic) Michal Ernst | Ford Fiesta RS WRC | DM |
| 22 | (Sweden) Pontus Tidemand | WRC | (Sweden) Pontus Tidemand | (Norway) Ola Fløene | Ford Fiesta RS WRC | MI |
| 23 | (United Kingdom) Prodrive WRC Team | WRC | (Finland) Jarkko Nikara | (Finland) Jarkko Kalliolepo | Mini John Cooper Works WRC | MI |
| 25 | (United Kingdom) Autotek Motorsport | WRC | (Finland) Jari Ketomaa | (Finland) Kaj Lindström | Ford Fiesta RS WRC | DM |
| 27 | (Sweden) Hasse Gustafsson | WRC | (Sweden) Hasse Gustafsson | (Sweden) Mikael Johansson | Ford Fiesta RS WRC | MI |
| 28 | (Ukraine) Oleksiy Tamrazov | WRC | (Ukraine) Oleksiy Tamrazov | (Ukraine) Pavlo Cherepin | Ford Fiesta RS WRC | MI |
| 32 | (Germany) Škoda Auto Deutschland | WRC-2 | (Germany) Sepp Wiegand | (Germany) Frank Christian | Škoda Fabia S2000 | MI |
| 34 | (Belgium) Symtech Racing | WRC-2 | (Ukraine) Yuriy Protasov | (Estonia) Kuldar Sikk | Subaru Impreza STi R4 | MI |
| 35 | (Saudi Arabia) Yazeed Racing | WRC-2 | (Saudi Arabia) Yazeed Al-Rajhi | (United Kingdom) Michael Orr | Ford Fiesta RRC | MI |
| 36 | (United Arab Emirates) Skydive Dubai Rally Team | WRC-2 | (United Arab Emirates) Rashid Al-Ketbi | (Germany) Karina Hepperle | Škoda Fabia S2000 | DM |
| 38 | (Mexico) Moto Club Igualda | WRC-2 | (Mexico) Ricardo Triviño | (Spain) Àlex Haro | Mitsubishi Lancer Evolution X | MI |
| 40 | (Kazakhstan) Arman Smailov | WRC-2 | (Kazakhstan) Arman Smailov | (Russia) Andrey Rusov | Subaru Impreza | TBA |
| 41 | (Peru) Nicolàs Fuchs | WRC-2 | (Peru) Nicolàs Fuchs | (Argentina) Fernando Mussano | Mitsubishi Lancer Evolution X | DM |
| 42 | (Norway) Anders Grøndal | WRC-2 | (Norway) Anders Grøndal | (Norway) Trond Svendsen | Subaru Impreza | MI |
| 43 | (Czech Republic) Semerád Rally Team | WRC-2 | (Czech Republic) Martin Hudec | (Czech Republic) Jakub Kotál | Mitsubishi Lancer Evolution IX | DM |
| 45 | (Spain) Alexander Villanueva | WRC-2 | (Spain) Alexander Villanueva | (Spain) Oscar Sanches | Mitsubishi Lancer Evolution X | TBA |
| 46 | (Italy) Marco Vallario | WRC-2 | (Italy) Marco Vallario | (Czech Republic) Antonio Pascale | Mitsubishi Lancer Evolution X | DM |
| 47 | (United Kingdom) DMACK-Autotek | WRC-2 | (Norway) Eyvind Brynildsen | (Sweden) Anders Fredrikssen | Ford Fiesta RRC | DM |

| Icon | Class |
|---|---|
| WRC | WRC entries eligible to score manufacturer points |
| WRC | Major entry ineligible to score manufacturer points |
| WRC-2 | Registered to take part in WRC-2 championship |

== Itinerary ==
The itinerary for the 2013 rally sees a mixture of the same stages from 2012. The first stage will be a Super Special Stage held at the rally base in Karlstad. WRC fans had the chance to vote on the Rally Sweden Facebook page as to who they wanted to see starting the rally head-to-head. The majority of fans voted for French Sébastien Loeb vs Sébastien Ogier who are bitter rivals from when Ogier was the number two driver at Citroën. Other 'dream heats' include Finns Mikko Hirvonen and Jari-Matti Latvala going head-to-head as well as two young Scandinavian drivers Mads Østberg vs Pontus Tidemand.

The first full day of the rally will be made up of seven special stages to the north of the rally base, mostly taking place in the region of Hagfors. Stages four and seven take place near Torsby. The day ends with the second and final running of the Karlstad Super Special Stage.

Day two will have eight stages across the region of Hagfors. Day three starts with the longest stage of the rally which is the 27.07 km (16.82 mi) stage of Mitandersfors near the region of Torsby and crosses the border into Norway. The next four stages take place near the Norwegian town of Kirkenær while the final stage of the day goes back to Sweden, taking place in Torsby which is also the Power Stage.

=== In detail ===
Itinerary of special stages
| Time (UTC+1) | Stage number | Stage name | Length (in km) | Length (in mi) |
Qualifying — 7 February
| 10:33 | Q | Råda | 3.99 km | 2.48 mi |
Leg 1 — 7–8 February
| 20:04 | SS1 | SSS Karlstad 1 | 1.90 km | 1.18 mi |
| 12:46 | —N/a | Service A — Hagfors | —N/a | —N/a |
| 8:39 | SS2 | Lesjöfors 1 | 15.00 km | 9.32 mi |
| 9:33 | SS3 | Värmullsåsen 1 | 23.77 km | 14.77 mi |
| 10:43 | SS4 | Vargåsen 1 | 24.63 km | 15.30 mi |
| 11:44 | —N/a | Service B — Hagfors | —N/a | —N/a |
| 13:21 | SS5 | Lesjöfors 2 | 15.00 km | 9.32 mi |
| 14:15 | SS6 | Värmullsåsen 2 | 23.77 km | 14.77 mi |
| 15:25 | SS7 | Vargåsen 2 | 24.63 km | 15.30 mi |
| 16:16 | —N/a | Service C — Hagfors | —N/a | —N/a |
| 19:00 | SS8 | SSS Karlstad 2 | 1.90 km | 1.18 mi |
Leg 2 — 9 February
| 7:25 | —N/a | Service D — Hagfors | —N/a | —N/a |
| 8:47 | SS9 | Sågen 1 | 13.73 km | 8.53 mi |
| 9:52 | SS10 | Fredriksberg 1 | 18.15 km | 11.28 mi |
| 10:39 | SS11 | Rämmen 1 | 22.76 km | 14.14 mi |
| 11:20 | SS12 | Hagfors Sprint 1 | 1.87 km | 1.16 mi |
| 12:01 | —N/a | Service E — Hagfors | —N/a | —N/a |
| 13:38 | SS13 | Sågen 2 | 13.73 km | 8.53 mi |
| 15:11 | SS14 | Fredriksberg 2 | 18.15 km | 11.28 mi |
| 15:30 | SS15 | Rämmen 2 | 22.76 km | 14.14 mi |
| 16:11 | SS16 | Hagfors Sprint 2 | 1.87 km | 1.16 mi |
| 16:42 | —N/a | Flexi Service — Hagfors | —N/a | —N/a |

Itinerary of special stages
| Time (UTC+1) | Stage number | Stage name | Length (in km) | Length (in mi) |
Leg 3 — 10 February
| 6:00 | —N/a | Service F — Hagfors | —N/a | —N/a |
| 7:54 | SS17 | Mitandersfors | 27.07 km | 16.82 mi |
| 9:11 | SS18 | Finnskogen 1 | 16.82 km | 10.45 mi |
| 10:06 | SS19 | Kirkener 1 | 7.16 km | 4.45 mi |
| 11:19 | SS20 | Kirkener 2 | 7.16 km | 4.45 mi |
| 11:54 | SS21 | Finnskogen 2 | 16.82 km | 10.45 mi |
| 13:29 | —N/a | Remote Service — Torsby | —N/a | —N/a |
| **14:12** | **SS22** | **Torsby** | **19.26 km** | **11.97 mi** |
| 22:56 | —N/a | Service G — Hagfors | —N/a | —N/a |

Key
| Icon | Meaning |
|---|---|
| | Special stage |
| | Service park |
| | Parc fermé |
| **Bold** | Power stage |

== Results ==
=== Event standings ===
| Pos. | No. | Driver | Co-driver | Team | Car | Class | Time | Difference | Overall points | WRC 2 Points |
Overall classification
| 1 | 8 | (France) Sébastien Ogier | (France) Julien Ingrassia | (Germany) Volkswagen Motorsport | Volkswagen Polo R WRC | WRC | 3:11:41.9 | 0.0 | 28 | |
| 2 | 1 | (France) Sébastien Loeb | (Monaco) Daniel Elena | (France) Citroën Total Abu Dhabi WRT | Citroën DS3 WRC | WRC | 3:12:23.7 | +41.8 | 18 | |
| 3 | 4 | (Norway) Mads Østberg | (Sweden) Jonas Andersson | (United Kingdom) Qatar M-Sport WRT | Ford Fiesta RS WRC | WRC | 3:13:06.4 | +1:24.5 | 16 | |
| 4 | 7 | (Finland) Jari-Matti Latvala | (Finland) Miikka Anttila | (Germany) Volkswagen Motorsport | Volkswagen Polo R WRC | WRC | 3:13:12.5 | +1:30.6 | 14 | |
| 5 | 11 | (Belgium) Thierry Neuville | (Belgium) Nicolas Gilsoul | (United Kingdom) Qatar World Rally Team | Ford Fiesta RS WRC | WRC | 3:16:48.3 | +5:06.4 | 10 | |
| 6 | 15 | (Finland) Juho Hänninen | (Finland) Tomi Tuominen | (United Kingdom) Qatar World Rally Team | Ford Fiesta RS WRC | WRC | 3:17:25.0 | +5:43.1 | 8 | |
| 7 | 21 | (Czech Republic) Martin Prokop | (Czech Republic) Michal Ernst | (Czech Republic) Jipocar Czech National Team | Ford Fiesta RS WRC | WRC | 3:23:07.3 | +11:25.4 | 6 | |
| 8 | 16 | (Norway) Henning Solberg | (Sweden) Emil Axelsson | (Norway) Henning Solberg | Ford Fiesta RS WRC | WRC | 3:23:34.6 | +11:52.7 | 4 | |
| 9 | 5 | (Russia) Evgeny Novikov | (Austria) Ilka Minor | (United Kingdom) Qatar M-Sport WRT | Ford Fiesta RS WRC | WRC | 3:24:46.6 | +13:04.7 | 2 | |
| 10 | 35 | (Saudi Arabia) Yazeed Al-Rajhi | (United Kingdom) Michael Orr | (Saudi Arabia) Yazeed Racing | Ford Fiesta RRC | WRC-2 | 3:28:08.9 | +16:27.0 | 1 | 25 |
| 11 | 42 | (Norway) Anders Grøndal | (Norway) Trond Svendsen | (Norway) Anders Grøndal | Subaru Impreza WRX STi | WRC-2 | 3:28:52.4 | +17:10.5 | | 18 |
| 13 | 32 | (Germany) Sepp Wiegand | (Germany) Frank Christian | (Germany) Škoda Auto Deutschland | Škoda Fabia S2000 | WRC-2 | 3:32:14.0 | +20:32.1 | | 15 |
| 15 | 34 | (Ukraine) Yuriy Protasov | (Estonia) Kuldar Sikk | (Belgium) Symtech Racing | Subaru Impreza STi R4 | WRC-2 | 3:37:10.2 | +25:28.3 | | 12 |
| 16 | 41 | (Peru) Nicolàs Fuchs | (Argentina) Fernando Mussano | (Peru) Nicolàs Fuchs | Mitsubishi Lancer Evolution X | WRC-2 | 3:42:58.7 | +31:16.8 | | 10 |
| 19 | 40 | (Kazakhstan) Arman Smailov | (Russia) Andrey Rusov | (Kazakhstan) Arman Smailov | Subaru Impreza WRX STi | WRC-2 | 3:48:00.9 | +36:19.0 | | 8 |
| 23 | 38 | (Mexico) Ricardo Triviño | (Spain) Àlex Haro | (Mexico) Moto Club Igualda | Mitsubishi Lancer Evolution X | WRC-2 | 3:57:28.0 | +45:46.1 | | 6 |
| 26 | 36 | (United Arab Emirates) Rashid Al-Ketbi | (Germany) Karina Hepperle | (United Arab Emirates) Skydive Dubai Rally Team | Škoda Fabia S2000 | WRC-2 | 4:06:11.4 | +54:29.5 | | 4 |
| 28 | 45 | (Spain) Alexander Villanueva | (Spain) Oscar Sanches | (Spain) Alexander Villanueva | Mitsubishi Lancer Evolution X | WRC-2 | 4:10:56.8 | +59:14.9 | | 2 |
| 31 | 43 | (Czech Republic) Martin Hudec | (Czech Republic) Jacub Kotál | (Czech Republic) Semerád Rally Team | Mitsubishi Lancer Evolution IX | WRC-2 | 4:40:08.2 | +1:28:26.1 | | 1 |

=== Notable retirements ===
| Stage | No. | Driver | Co-driver | Team | Car | Class | Cause |
|---|---|---|---|---|---|---|---|
| SS5 | 47 | (Norway) Eyvind Brynildsen | (Sweden) Anders Fredriksson | (United Kingdom) DMACK-Autotek | Ford Fiesta RRC | WRC-2 | Engine |
| SS9 | 22 | (Sweden) Pontus Tidemand | (Norway) Ola Fløene | (Sweden) Pontus Tidemand | Ford Fiesta RS WRC | WRC | Engine |
| SS15 | 10 | (United Arab Emirates) Khalid Al Qassimi | (United Kingdom) Scott Martin | (France) Abu Dhabi Citroen Total World Rally Team | Citroën DS3 WRC | WRC | Engine |
| SS16 | 25 | (Finland) Jari Ketomaa | (Finland) Kaj Lindström | (Finland) Jari Ketomaa | Ford Fiesta RS WRC | WRC | Co-Driver ill |
| SS20 | 14 | (Spain) Dani Sordo | (Spain) Carlos del Barrio | (France) Abu Dhabi Citroen Total World Rally Team | Citroën DS3 WRC | WRC | Off road |

=== Special stages ===
| Day | Stage number | Stage name | Length | Stage winner | Car No. | Team | Time | Avg. spd. | Rally leader |
|---|---|---|---|---|---|---|---|---|---|
| Leg 1 (7-8 Feb) | SS1 | (Sweden) Karlstad Super-Special 1 | 1.90 km | (France) Sébastien Loeb (Monaco) Daniel Elena | 1 | (France) Citroën Total Abu Dhabi WRT | 1:34.5 | 72.38 km/h | (France) Sébastien Loeb (Monaco) Daniel Elena |
| Leg 1 (7-8 Feb) | SS2 | (Sweden) Lesjöfors 1 | 15.00 km | (France) Sébastien Ogier (France) Julien Ingrassia | 8 | (Germany) Volkswagen Motorsport | 9:15.8 | 97.15 km/h | (France) Sébastien Ogier (France) Julien Ingrassia |
| Leg 1 (7-8 Feb) | SS3 | (Sweden) Värmullsåsen 1 | 23.77 km | (France) Sébastien Ogier (France) Julien Ingrassia | 8 | (Germany) Volkswagen Motorsport | 13:48.0 | 103.35 km/h | (France) Sébastien Ogier (France) Julien Ingrassia |
| Leg 1 (7-8 Feb) | SS4 | (Sweden) Vargåsen 1 | 24.63 km | (Norway) Mads Østberg (Sweden) Jonas Andersson | 4 | (United Kingdom) Qatar M-Sport WRT | 13:45.1 | 107.46 km/h | (France) Sébastien Ogier (France) Julien Ingrassia |
| Leg 1 (7-8 Feb) | SS5 | (Sweden) Lesjöfors 2 | 15.00 km | (France) Sébastien Ogier (France) Julien Ingrassia | 8 | (Germany) Volkswagen Motorsport | 8:59.1 | 100.17 km/h | (France) Sébastien Ogier (France) Julien Ingrassia |
| Leg 1 (7-8 Feb) | SS6 | (Sweden) Värmullsåsen 2 | 23.77 km | (France) Sébastien Ogier (France) Julien Ingrassia | 8 | (Germany) Volkswagen Motorsport | 13:33.6 | 105.18 km/h | (France) Sébastien Ogier (France) Julien Ingrassia |
| Leg 1 (7-8 Feb) | SS7 | (Sweden) Vargåsen 2 | 24.63 km | (France) Sébastien Ogier (France) Julien Ingrassia | 8 | (Germany) Volkswagen Motorsport | 13:24.4 | 110.23 km/h | (France) Sébastien Ogier (France) Julien Ingrassia |
| Leg 1 (7-8 Feb) | SS8 | (Sweden) Karlstad Super-Special 2 | 1.90 km | (Finland) Mikko Hirvonen (Finland) Jarmo Lehtinen | 2 | (France) Citroën Total Abu Dhabi WRT | 1:35.9 | 71.32 km/h | (France) Sébastien Ogier (France) Julien Ingrassia |
| Leg 1 (7-8 Feb) | SS8 | (Sweden) Karlstad Super-Special 2 | 1.90 km | (Belgium) Thierry Neuville (Belgium) Nicolas Gilsoul | 11 | (United Kingdom) Qatar World Rally Team | 1:35.9 | 71.32 km/h | (France) Sébastien Ogier (France) Julien Ingrassia |
| Leg 2 (9 Feb) | SS9 | (Sweden) Sågen 1 | 13.73 km | (France) Sébastien Ogier (France) Julien Ingrassia | 8 | (Germany) Volkswagen Motorsport | 7:07.4 | 115.65 km/h | (France) Sébastien Ogier (France) Julien Ingrassia |
| Leg 2 (9 Feb) | SS10 | (Sweden) Fredriksberg 1 | 18.15 km | (Finland) Jari-Matti Latvala (Finland) Miikka Anttila | 7 | (Germany) Volkswagen Motorsport | 10:24.6 | 104.61 km/h | (France) Sébastien Ogier (France) Julien Ingrassia |
| Leg 2 (9 Feb) | SS11 | (Sweden) Rämmen 1 | 22.76 km | (France) Sébastien Loeb (Monaco) Daniel Elena | 1 | (France) Citroën Total Abu Dhabi WRT | 11:42.6 | 116.62 km/h | (France) Sébastien Ogier (France) Julien Ingrassia |
| Leg 2 (9 Feb) | SS12 | (Sweden) Hagfors Sprint 1 | 1.87 km | (Finland) Mikko Hirvonen (Finland) Jarmo Lehtinen | 2 | (France) Citroën Total Abu Dhabi WRT | 1:55.8 | 58.13 km/h | (France) Sébastien Ogier (France) Julien Ingrassia |
| Leg 2 (9 Feb) | SS13 | (Sweden) Sågen 2 | 13.73 km | (France) Sébastien Loeb (Monaco) Daniel Elena | 1 | (France) Citroën Total Abu Dhabi WRT | 7:00.2 | 117.63 km/h | (France) Sébastien Ogier (France) Julien Ingrassia |
| Leg 2 (9 Feb) | SS13 | (Sweden) Sågen 2 | 13.73 km | (France) Sébastien Ogier (France) Julien Ingrassia | 8 | (Germany) Volkswagen Motorsport | 7:00.2 | 117.63 km/h | (France) Sébastien Ogier (France) Julien Ingrassia |
| Leg 2 (9 Feb) | SS14 | (Sweden) Fredriksberg 2 | 18.15 km | (France) Sébastien Ogier (France) Julien Ingrassia | 8 | (Germany) Volkswagen Motorsport | 10:16.6 | 105.97 km/h | (France) Sébastien Ogier (France) Julien Ingrassia |
| Leg 2 (9 Feb) | SS15 | (Sweden) Rämmen 2 | 22.76 km | (France) Sébastien Ogier (France) Julien Ingrassia | 8 | (Germany) Volkswagen Motorsport | 11:42.9 | 116.57 km/h | (France) Sébastien Ogier (France) Julien Ingrassia |
| Leg 2 (9 Feb) | SS16 | (Sweden) Hagfors Sprint 2 | 1.87 km | (France) Sébastien Loeb (Monaco) Daniel Elena | 1 | (France) Citroën Total Abu Dhabi WRT | 2:00.7 | 55.77 km/h | (France) Sébastien Ogier (France) Julien Ingrassia |
| Leg 3 (10 Feb) | SS17 | (Sweden) / Mitandersfors^{1}; (Norway) / Mitandersfors^{1} | 27.07 km | (France) Sébastien Loeb (Monaco) Daniel Elena | 1 | (France) Citroën Total Abu Dhabi WRT | 14:00.1 | 116.00 km/h | (France) Sébastien Ogier (France) Julien Ingrassia |
| Leg 3 (10 Feb) | SS18 | (Norway) Finnskogen 1 | 16.82 km | (France) Sébastien Loeb (Monaco) Daniel Elena | 1 | (France) Citroën Total Abu Dhabi WRT | 9:00.0 | 112.13 km/h | (France) Sébastien Ogier (France) Julien Ingrassia |
| Leg 3 (10 Feb) | SS19 | (Norway) Kirkenær 1 | 7.16 km | (France) Sébastien Loeb (Monaco) Daniel Elena | 1 | (France) Citroën Total Abu Dhabi WRT | 5:42.7 | 75.21 km/h | (France) Sébastien Ogier (France) Julien Ingrassia |
| Leg 3 (10 Feb) | SS20 | (Norway) Kirkenær 2 | 7.16 km | (France) Sébastien Ogier (France) Julien Ingrassia | 8 | (Germany) Volkswagen Motorsport | 5:38.9 | 76.06 km/h | (France) Sébastien Ogier (France) Julien Ingrassia |
| Leg 3 (10 Feb) | SS21 | (Norway) Finnskogen 2 | 16.82 km | (Norway) Mads Østberg (Sweden) Jonas Andersson | 4 | (United Kingdom) Qatar M-Sport WRT | 8:55.8 | 113.01 km/h | (France) Sébastien Ogier (France) Julien Ingrassia |
| Leg 3 (10 Feb) | SS22 | (Sweden) / Torsby; (Sweden) / (Power stage) | 19.26 km | (France) Sébastien Ogier (France) Julien Ingrassia | 8 | (Germany) Volkswagen Motorsport | 9:54.1 | 116.71 km/h | (France) Sébastien Ogier (France) Julien Ingrassia |

Notes:

- ^1 — The Mitandersfors stage started in Sweden and finished in Norway.
