= Timo Gottschalk =

German rally co-driver (born 1974)

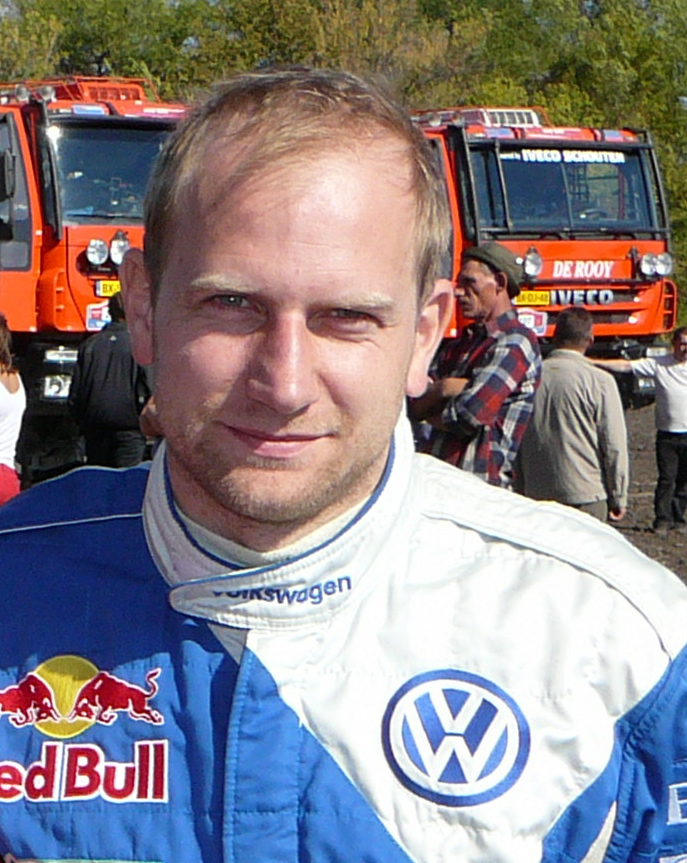
Timo Gottschalk

Timo Gottschalk (born August 28, 1974 in Neuruppin) is a German rally co-driver, most notable for being on the winning team of the 2011 Dakar Rally alongside Nasser Al-Attiyah and in 2025 with Yazeed Al-Rajhi.

== Career ==
Gottschalk made his debut in the Dakar Rally as navigator to compatriot Dieter Depping in the truck category in 2007, the pair finishing 26th. The following year's event was cancelled, but Depping and Gottschalk managed to finish a creditable third place overall in the car category of the replacement 2008 Central Europe Rally, driving a factory Volkswagen Touareg. Depping and Gottschalk continued with the factory Volkswagen team for the Dakar Rally's inaugural visit to South America in 2009 finished sixth overall, albeit almost nine hours down on their victorious teammates Giniel de Villiers and Dirk von Zitzewitz.

Gottschalk then teamed up with Nasser Al-Attiyah for the 2010 event, the pair winning four stages together en route to finishing runners-up to Volkswagen teammates Carlos Sainz and Lucas Cruz, just over two minutes down on the winning time. Gottschalk and Al-Attiyah returned in 2011, assuming the lead of the rally after victory in the eighth stage. Problems for Sainz and Cruz in the eleventh stage handed Gottschalk and Al-Attiyah a lead of over 50 minutes that they would maintain until the end of the rally.

Gottschalk chose not to return to the Dakar to defend his crown in 2012, instead becoming co-driver to young German rally driver Sepp Wiegand in the Intercontinental Rally Challenge. In the past, he has also partnered Andreas Aigner in the World Rally Championship and Armin Kremer in the Asia-Pacific Rally Championship. Gottschalk returned to Dakar in 2013 as a partner to Carlos Sainz in the new Qatar Red Bull team, winning the opening stage of the rally, but the pair failed to finish after engine problems on the sixth stage halted their progress.

In 2018, Gottschalk won the Silk Way Rallye alongside driver Yazeed Al-Rajhi. In 2025, he and Al-Rajhi won the 2025 Dakar Rally. He later revealed that the event, his 17th attempt at the Dakar, had been his toughest challenge yet, with consistency from him and Al-Rajhi having been the deciding factor in their victory.
