= Yazeed Al-Rajhi =

Saudi rally driver and businessman (born 1981)

Yazeed Al Rajhi
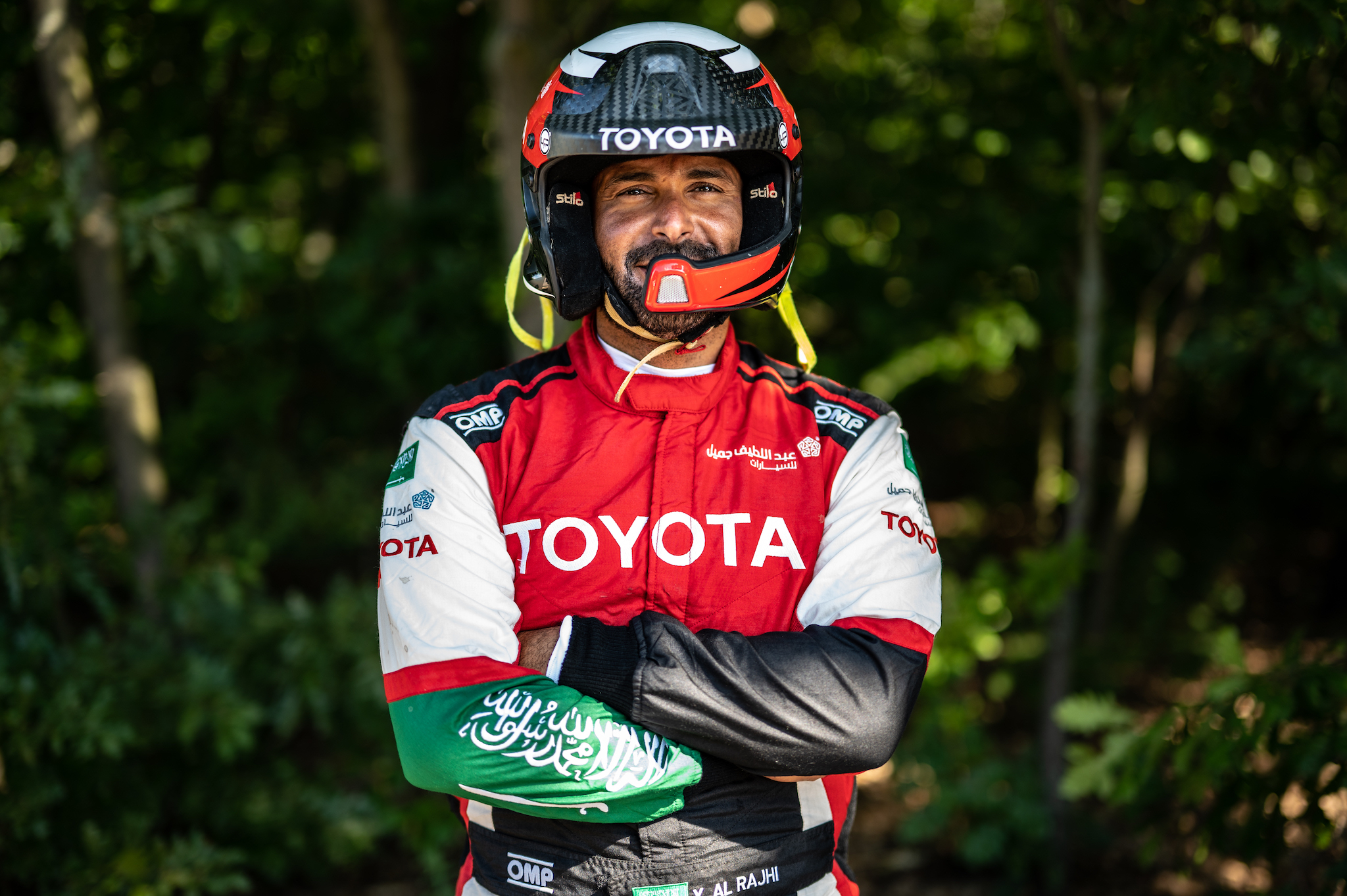
- Al-Rajhi in 2021

Personal information
- Nationality: Saudi Arabian
- Born: 30 September 1981 (age 45); Riyadh, Saudi Arabia

World Rally Championship record
- Years active: 2008, 2010–2018
- Co-driver: (Germany) Timo Gottschalk
- Teams: Overdrive Racing – Toyota
- Championships: 2021 Cross Country Baja; 2022 Cross Country Baja; 2019 Saudi Toyota Championship; 2022 Saudi Toyota Championship
- First rally: 2007 Jordan Rally

Yazeed Mohamed Al-Rajhi (Arabic: يزيد محمد الراجحي; born 5 may 1981 in Riyadh) is a Saudi businessman and rally driver. He is from the family that founded the largest bank in Saudi Arabia.

Al-Rajhi was born and raised in Riyadh. He began his working life at an early age when his father appointed him in 1998 as an observer of the Private Property Office and later became its genz manager throughout the Kingdom in 2004.

Al-Rajhi has argued against free speech in Saudi Arabia, saying, "We should not accept any negative talk about our rulers, even in private settings."

== Rally career ==
At the same time, Al-Rajhi is a Rally driver and a two-time FIA World Cup champion in 2021 and 2022, a four-time champion in the local championship, the Saudi Toyota Championship in 2019 and 2022–24, and a winner of the Dakar Rally.

Al-Rajhi has been competing in the World Rally Championship and other international rally events since 2007 and stopped at the end of 2018. He later started to participate in the cross-country rallies, and his debut at the Dakar Rally was in 2015.

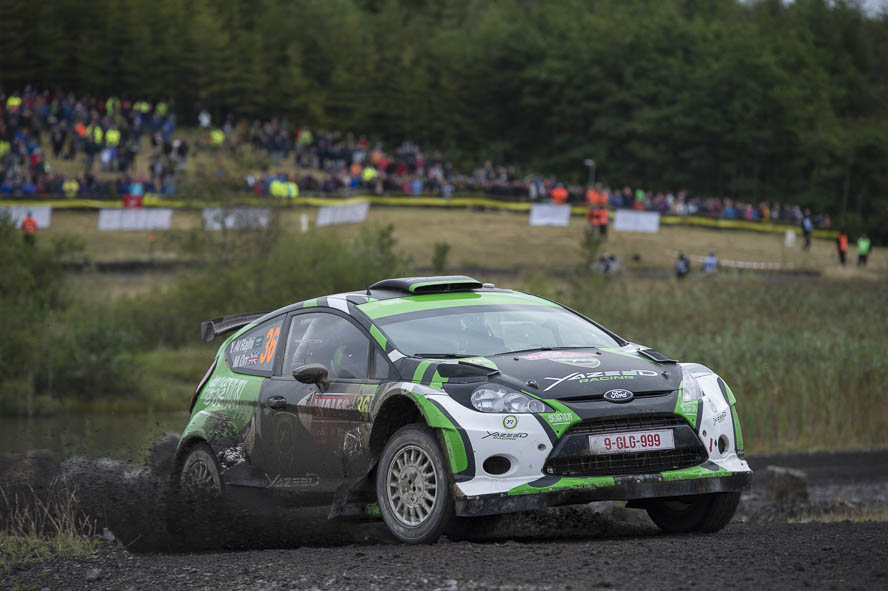
Al-Rajhi competing in the 2012 Wales Rally GB

In 2007, Al-Rajhi established his own racing team. It was known as the Al-Rajhi Racing Team and later renamed Yazeed Racing Team, where he started his first unofficial competition in the Middle East Rally Championship (MERC), the 2007 Jordan Rally, in order to gain experience so he can formally participate in different rally championships in the future. After that, he scored his first ever points (eighth place) in Greek 2012 Acropolis Rally in the 40th season of the World Rally Championship (WRC).

Nicknamed the Black Horse, Al Rajhi made his WRC debut at the 2008 Rally Argentina with a Subaru Impreza WRX STI in the 2008 Jordan Rally, as his other WRC appearance of the year. He returned to the top level in 2010, finishing 13th overall on the Jordan Rally in a Peugeot 207 S2000. He also contested that year's Rally d'Italia Sardegna, a round of the Intercontinental Rally Challenge, but he retired after losing a wheel. In 2011, he contested seven WRC rounds but retired from six of them. He also competed in the 2011 Tour de Corse, finishing 14th. The Saudi won the Silk Way Rally in 2018. In 2019, Al Rajhi won the first edition of Saudi Desert Rally Championship. Yazeed occupied the top positions in Dakar 2020, with his best finish in fourth place. Moving to the new year, the Saudi motorsport icon left a historical imprint in the second edition of the Dakar Rally in Saudi Arabia after winning two stages in the Dakar Rally 2021 in his Toyota Hilux. He became the first Saudi and Arab to win on home soil in his class and the youngest contestant to win a stage in Dakar that year. In 2025, Yazeed won the 2025 Dakar Rally, becoming the first Saudi to win the Dakar on home soil.

== Championship titles ==
- 2021 [FIA World Cup for Cross Country Baja]
- 2022 [FIA World Cup for Cross Country Baja]
- 2019 [Saudi Toyota Championship]
- 2022 [Saudi Toyota Championship]
- 2023 [Saudi Toyota Championship]
- 2024 [Saudi Toyota Championship]
- 20225 [Saudi Toyota Championship]

== Personal titles ==
- The first Saudi to be selected in 2008 by the Unicef as the Goodwill ambassador in Saudi Arabia and the Gulf, for one year
- The first Saudi to be appointed as a 'Donate Life' ambassador in 2009
- In 2009 he got the title of 'Gentleman' by Rotana magazines readers' popular
- In 2008 he came in third position in the Mobily and Riyadiah 'Most Distinguished Athlete in Saudi Arabia ' competition
- Received the title of ambassador for fighting drugs in Saudi Arabia
- The best upcoming competitor in the third round of the World Rally Competition taking place in Jordon – 2010

== Racing career ==
=== Results of 2026 ===
Rally name	Position	Category
Dakar (Saudi Arabia)	DNF	W2RC
Saudi Baja (Saudi Arabia)	2nd	FIA World Baja Cup
Rally Raid Portugal	6th	W2RC
Desafio Ruta 40 (Argentina)	6th	W2RC
Baja Aragon (Spain)	DNF	FIA World Baja Cup

=== Results of 2025 ===
Rally name	Position	Category
Dakar (Saudi Arabia)	1st	W2RC
Saudi Baja (Saudi Arabia)	2nd	FIA World Baja Cup
ADDC Rally (United Arab Emirates)	19th	W2RC
Baja Jordan	Accident	FIA World Baja Cup
Baja Sharish (Portugal)	DNF	FIA European Baja Cup
Rally Raid Portugal	22dn	W2RC
Rallye du Maroc (Morocco)	DNF	W2RC
Qassim Rally (Saudi Arabia)	1st	Saudi Toyota Championship
Rally Jeddah (Saudi Arabia)	1st	Saudi Toyota Championship

=== Results of 2024 ===
Rally name	Position	Category
Dakar (Saudi Arabia)	Withdrawal	W2RC
Baja Hail (Saudi Arabia)	1st	Saudi Toyota Championship
ADDC Rally (United Arab Emirates)	2nd	W2RC
Tabuk Toyota (Saudi Arabia)	1st	Saudi Toyota Championship
Desafio Ruta 40 (Argentina)	3rd	W2RC
Qassim Rally (Saudi Arabia)	1st	Saudi Toyota Championship

=== Results of 2023 ===
Rally name	Position	Category
Dakar (Saudi Arabia)	86th	W2RC
ADDC Rally (United Arab Emirates)	1st	W2RC
Sonora Rally (Mexico)	2nd	W2RC
Tabuk-Neom	1st	Saudi Toyota Championship
Italian Baja (Italy)	1st	CCR Bajas
Baja Aragon (Spain)	P9	CCR Bajas
Desafio Ruta 40 (Argentina)	3rd	W2RC

=== Results of 2022 ===
Rally name	Position	Category
Dakar (Saudi Arabia)	3rd	W2RC
Russian Baja (Russia)	Retired	CCR Bajas
Baja Jordan	11th	CCR Bajas
Qatar Baja	2nd	CCR Bajas
ADDC Rally (United Arab Emirates)	12th	W2RC
Italian Baja (Italy)	1st	CCR Bajas
Baja Aragon (Spain)	2nd	CCR Bajas
Baja Poland	Retired	CCR Bajas
Aseer Rally (Saudi Arabia)	1st	Saudi Toyota Championship
Rallye du Maroc (Morocco)	4th	W2RC
Qassim Rally (Saudi Arabia)	1st	Saudi Toyota Championship
Andalucia Rally (Spain)	3rd	W2RC
Baja Portalegre 500 (Portugal)	16th	CCR Bajas
Hail Rally (Saudi Arabia)	1st	CCR Bajas + Saudi Toyota Championship
Baja Dubai (United Arab Emirates)	4th	CCR Bajas
Rally Jeddah (Saudi Arabia)	1st	Saudi Toyota Championship

=== Best results of 2021 ===
Rally name	Position	Category
Dakar (Saudi Arabia)	16th	Dakar Rally
Dubai International Baja (United Arab Emirates)	1st	CCR Bajas
Baja Aragon (Spain)	3rd	CCR Bajas
Hungarian Baja (Hungary)	2nd	CCR Bajas
Baja Poland	2nd	CCR Bajas
Italian Baja (Italy)	1st	CCR Bajas
Baja Portalegre 500 (Portugal)	10th	CCR Bajas
Andalucia Rally (Spain)	3rd	CCR
Rally Kazakhstan	17th	CCR
Rallye du Maroc (Morocco)	2nd	CCR
Abu Dhabi Desert Challenge (United Arab Emirates)	3rd	CCR
Hail Rally (Saudi Arabia)	Retired	CCR

=== Best results of 2020 ===
Rally name	Position	Category
Dakar (Saudi Arabia)	4th	Dakar Rally
Qatar Rally	2nd	CCR
Hail Rally (Saudi Arabia)	RET	[1]SAMF
Andalucia Rally (Spain)	3rd	CCR
Baja Hail 1 (Saudi Arabia)	4th	CCR Bajas
Baja Hail 2 (Saudi Arabia)	3rd	CCR Bajas

=== Best results 2019 ===
Rally name	Position	Category
Dakar (Peru)	7th	Dakar Rally
Qatar Rally	2nd	SAMF
Abu Dhabi Rally (United Arab Emirates)	RET	CCR
Qassim Rally (Saudi Arabia)	1st	SAMF
AlUla Neom (Saudi Arabia)	1st	SAMF
Riyadh Rally (Saudi Arabia)	1st	SAMF
Sharqiyah Rally (Saudi Arabia)	1st	SAMF

=== Best results 2018 ===
Rally name	Position	Category
Silkway Rally (Russia) (China) (Kazakhstan)	1st	CCR
Category Kazakhstan Rally	1st	CCR

=== Best results 2017 ===
Rally name	Position	Category
Rally Italia Sardinia (Italy)	1st	WRC Trophy

=== Best results 2016 ===
- Third Overall in Cross Country Championship – CCR (2016)

Rally name	Position	Category
Dakar (Argentina) (Bolivia)	11th	Dakar Rally
Hail Rally (Saudi Arabia)	2nd	SAMF
Abu Dhabi Rally (United Arab Emirates)	2nd	CCR
Qatar Rally	2nd	CCR
Silkway Raly (Russia) (China) (Kazakhstan)	2nd	CCR

=== Best results 2015 ===
- Third Overall in Cross Country Championship – CCR (2015)
- Al Rajhi made his debut in Dakar.

Rally name	Position	Category
Dakar (Argentina) (Bolivia) (Chile)	3rd then Ret	Dakar Rally
Sweden Rally	4th	WRC2
Kuwait Rally	3rd	MERS
Hail Rally (Saudi Arabia)	1st	SAMF
Abu Dhabi Rally (United Arab Emirates)	4th	CCR
Jeddah Rally (Saudi Arabia)	1st	SAMF
Pharaohs Rally (Egypt)	2nd	CCR
Morocco Rally	3rd	CCR

=== Best results 2014 ===
- Third Overall in Cross Country Championship – CCR.

Rally name	Position	Category
Sweden Rally	4th	WRC
Qatar Rally	4th	MERC
Jeddah Rally (Saudi Arabia)	1st	SAMF
Kuwait Rally	3rd	MERC
Russia Rally	1st	CCR
Rally Sardegna (Italy)	1st	CCR
Pharaohs Rally (Egypt)	1st	CCR
Poland Rally	3rd	WRC2
Neste Oil Rally Finland	4th	WRC2
Cyprus Rally	1st	ERC

=== Best results 2013 ===
- Fifth Overall in World Rally Championship WRC2.
- Fifth Overall in Middle East Rally Championship MERS.

Rally name	Position	Category
Sweden Rally	1st	WRC2
Coates Hire – Rally Australia	3rd	WRC2
Rally Catalunya (Spain)	2nd	WRC2

=== Best results 2012 ===
- Third Overall in World Rally Championship WRC2.

Rally name	Position	Category
Hail Rally (Saudi Arabia)	1st	SAMF
Acropolis Rally (Greece)	2nd	WRC2
Auto24 Rally (Estonia)	2nd	WRC2
Neste Oil Rally Finland	2nd	WRC2
Wales Rally GP	3rd	WRC2
Rally de France	2nd	WRC2
Rally Jordan	3rd	MERS
Costa Daurada Rally Catalunya (Spain)	3rd	WRC2

=== Best results 2011 ===
Rally name	Position	Category
Rallye Terre Des Cardabelles (France)	3rd	WRC2
Spain Rally	1st	WRC2
Rally Terre Cardbells (Italy)	2nd	WRC2

=== Best results 2010 ===
Rally name	Position	Category
Hail Rally (Saudi Arabia)	1st	SAMF
Rally Jordan	1st	WRC2
Sharqiyah Rally (Saudi Arabia)	1st	MERC
Sharqiyah Rally (Saudi Arabia)	1st	SAMF
Rallye Terre Des Cardabelles (France)	2nd	WRC2

=== Best results 2009 ===
- Third Overall in MERC.

Rally name	Position	Category
Hail Rally (Saudi Arabia)	1st	SAMF
Qatar Rally	2nd	MERC
Syria International Rally	1st	MERC
Rally Lebanon	3rd	MERC

=== Best results 2008 ===
Rally name	Position	Category
Rally Lebanon	4th	MERC
Sharqiyah Rally (Saudi Arabia)	1st	SAMF
Sharqiyah Rally (Saudi Arabia)	1st	MERC

=== Victories of Saudi Arabia Motor Federation (SAMF) ===
Year	Vehicle	Class	Position	Stage Name
2008	Mitsubishi (Japan)	T1	1st	Sharqiyah Rally
2009	Nissan (Japan)	T1	1st	Hail Rally
2010	Mitsubishi (Japan)	T1	1st	Hail Rally
2010	Peugeot (France)	T1	1st	Sharqiyah Rally
2012	Mini (United Kingdom)	T1	1st	Hail Rally
2015	Hummer (United States)	T1	1st	Hail Rally
2015	Hummer (United States)	T1	1st	Jeddah Rally
2016	Hummer (United States)	T1	1st	Hail Rally
2019	Toyota (Japan)	T1	1st	Qassim Rally
2019	Toyota (Japan)	T1	1st	AlUla-Neom Rally
2019	Toyota (Japan)	T1	1st	Riyadh Rally
2019	Toyota (Japan)	T1	1st	Sharqiyah Rally

== Career results ==
=== Complete World Rally Championship results ===
Year	Entrant	Car	1	2	3	4	5	6	7	8	9	10	11	12	13	14	15	Pos.	Points
2008	Yazeed Al-Rajhi	Subaru Impreza WRX STI	MON	SWE	MEX	ARG; Ret	JOR; Ret	ITA	GRE	TUR	FIN	GER	NZL	ESP	FRA	JPN	GBR	NC	0
2010	Al-Rajhi Racing Team	Peugeot 207 S2000	SWE	MEX	JOR; 13	TUR	NZL	POR	BUL	FIN	GER	JPN	FRA	ESP	GBR			NC	0
2011	Al-Rajhi Racing Team	Peugeot 207 S2000	SWE	MEX	POR; Ret	JOR	ITA; Ret	ARG	GRE; Ret	FIN	GER; Ret	AUS	FRA; 34	ESP; Ret				NC	0
2011	Al-Rajhi Racing Team	Ford Fiesta S2000													GBR; Ret			NC	0
2012	Yazeed Racing	Ford Fiesta RRC	MON	SWE; 24	MEX	POR; Ret	ARG	GRE; 8	NZL; 28	FIN; 17	GER; Ret	GBR; 16	FRA; 18	ITA	ESP; 15			26th	4
2013	Yazeed Racing	Ford Fiesta RRC	MON	SWE; 10	MEX	POR; WD	ARG	GRE	ITA	FIN; 12	GER	AUS; 12	FRA	ESP; 12	GBR; 18			29th	1
2014	Yazeed Racing	Ford Fiesta RRC	MON	SWE; 14	MEX	POR	ARG	ITA; Ret	POL; 13	FIN; 13	GER	AUS; Ret	FRA	ESP	GBR			NC	0
2015	Yazeed Racing	Ford Fiesta RRC	MON	SWE; 16	MEX	ARG	POR; Ret	ITA; Ret	POL	FIN	GER	AUS; Ret	FRA	ESP; Ret	GBR			NC	0
2016	Yazeed Racing	Ford Fiesta RS WRC	MON	SWE; Ret	MEX	ARG	POR; 11	ITA; Ret	POL; Ret	FIN; Ret	GER	CHN; C	FRA	ESP	GBR; Ret	AUS		NC	0
2017	Yazeed Racing	Ford Fiesta RS WRC	MON	SWE	MEX	FRA	ARG	POR	ITA; 13	POL	FIN	GER	ESP	GBR; Ret	AUS			NC	0
2018	Yazeed Racing	Ford Fiesta RS WRC	MON	SWE; Ret	MEX	FRA	ARG	POR; Ret	ITA; Ret	FIN	GER	TUR; Ret	GBR	ESP	AUS			NC	0

* Season still in progress.

=== SWRC results ===
Year	Entrant	Car	1	2	3	4	5	6	7	8	Pos.	Points
2012	Yazeed Racing	Ford Fiesta RRC	MON	SWE; 5	POR; Ret	NZL; 4	FIN; 2	GBR; 3	FRA; 2	ESP; 3	3rd	88

=== WRC-2 results ===
Year	Entrant	Car	1	2	3	4	5	6	7	8	9	10	11	12	13	Pos.	Points
2013	Yazeed Racing	Ford Fiesta RRC	MON	SWE; 1	MEX	POR; WD	ARG	GRE	ITA	FIN; 4	GER	AUS; 3	FRA	ESP; 2	GBR; 8	5th	74
2014	Yazeed Racing	Ford Fiesta RRC	MON	SWE; 4	MEX	POR	ARG	ITA; Ret	POL; 3	FIN; 4	GER	AUS; Ret	FRA	ESP	GBR	11th	39
2015	Yazeed Racing	Ford Fiesta RRC	MON	SWE; 4	MEX	ARG	POR; Ret	ITA; Ret	POL	FIN	GER	AUS; Ret	FRA	ESP; Ret	GBR	28th	12

=== WRC-Trophy results ===
Year	Entrant	Car	1	2	3	4	5	6	7	8	9	10	11	12	13	Pos.	Points
2017	Yazeed Racing	Ford Fiesta RS WRC	MON	SWE	MEX	FRA	ARG	POR	ITA; 1	POL	FIN	GER	ESP	GBR; Ret	AUS	5th	25

=== ERC results ===
Year	Entrant	Car	1	2	3	4	5	6	7	8	9	10	11	Pos.	Points
2014	Yazeed Racing	Ford Fiesta RRC	JÄN	LIE	GRE	IRE	AZO	YPR	EST	CZE	CYP; 1	VAL	COR	15th	38

=== Dakar Rally results ===
Year	Class	Vehicle	Position	Stages won
2015	Cars	(Japan) Toyota	DNF	1
2016	Cars	(Japan) Toyota	11th	0
2017	Cars	(United Kingdom) Mini	27th	0
2018	Cars	(United Kingdom) Mini	DNF	0
2019	Cars	(United Kingdom) Mini	7th	0
2020	Cars	(Japan) Toyota	4th	0
2021	Cars	(Japan) Toyota	16th	2
2022	Cars	(Japan) Toyota	3rd	0
2023	Cars	(Japan) Toyota	37th	1
2024	Cars	(Japan) Toyota	DNF	0
2025	Cars	(Japan) Toyota	1st	1

=== Complete World Rally-Raid Championship results ===
(key)

Year	Team	Car	Class	1	2	3	4	5	Pos.	Points
2022	Toyota Gazoo Racing	Toyota Hilux Overdrive	T1	DAK; 3^{51}	ABU; 12^{20}	MOR; 6^{29}	AND; 3^{21}		3rd	121
2023	Overdrive Racing	Hilux Overdrive	T1+	DAK; 30^{19}	ABU; 1^{44}	SON; 2^{43}	DES; 3^{32}	MOR; 1^{43}	2nd	181
2024	Overdrive Racing	Hilux Overdrive	Ultimate	DAK; Ret^{14}	ABU; 2^{37}	PRT; 5^{28}	DES; 1^{52}	MOR; 4^{29}	2nd	160
2025	Overdrive Racing	Hilux Overdrive	Ultimate	DAK; 1^{70}	ABU; 28^{3}	ZAF	PRT; 46^{4}	MOR; Ret^{1}	6th	78
2026	Overdrive Racing	Toyota Hilux Overdrive	Ultimate	DAK; Ret^{5}	PRT	DES	MOR	ABU	21st*	5*

* Season still in progress.
