= 2015 FIA Cross Country Rally World Cup =

2015 FIA Cross Country Rally World Cup
Previous:	2014	Next:	2016

The 2015 FIA Cross Country Rally World Cup season is the 23rd season of the FIA Cross Country Rally World Cup.

== Calendar ==
The calendar for the 2015 season features ten rallies. Some of the rallies are also part of the FIM Cross-Country Rallies World Championship and the FIM Bajas World Cup.

The six Bajas award 30 points to the winner, whereas the other four events are worth 60 points for the winner.

Round	Dates	Rally name
1	20–22 February	Baja Russia Northern Forest
2	28 March–2 April	(United Arab Emirates) Abu Dhabi Desert Challenge
3	20–24 April	(Qatar) Sealine Cross-Country Rally
4	12–16 May	(Egypt) Rallye des Pharaons
5	26–28 June	(Italy) Italian Baja
6	24–26 July	(Spain) Baja Aragón
7	14–16 August	(Hungary) Hungarian Baja
8	28–30 August	Baja Poland
9	3–9 October	(Morocco) Rallye OiLibya du Maroc
10	22–24 October	(Portugal) Baja de Portalegre 500

== Results ==
Round	Rally name	Podium finishers			
Round	Rally name	Rank	Driver	Car	Time
1	Baja Russia Northern Forest	1	(Finland) Tapio Suominen (Finland) Toni Näsman	Toyota Hilux Overdrive	3:37:10
1	Baja Russia Northern Forest	2	(Russia) Vladimir Vasilyev (Russia) Konstantin Zhiltsov	Mini All4 Racing X-Raid	3:38:17
1	Baja Russia Northern Forest	3	(Brazil) Reinaldo Varela (Brazil) Gustavo Gugelmin	Toyota Hilux Overdrive	3:44:27
2	(United Arab Emirates) Abu Dhabi Desert Challenge	1	(Russia) Vladimir Vasilyev (Russia) Konstantin Zhiltsov	Mini All4 Racing X-Raid	14:52:48
2	(United Arab Emirates) Abu Dhabi Desert Challenge	2	(Netherlands) Erik van Loon (Netherlands) Wouter Rosegaar	Mini All4 Racing X-Raid	15:13:03
2	(United Arab Emirates) Abu Dhabi Desert Challenge	3	(United Kingdom) Harry Hunt (Germany) Andreas Schulz	Mini All4 Racing X-Raid	15:43:36
3	(Qatar) Sealine Cross-Country Rally	1	(Qatar) Nasser Al-Attiyah (France) Mathieu Baumel	Mini All4 Racing X-Raid	17:40:05
3	(Qatar) Sealine Cross-Country Rally	2	(Russia) Vladimir Vasilyev (Russia) Konstantin Zhiltsov	Mini All4 Racing X-Raid	18:07:58
3	(Qatar) Sealine Cross-Country Rally	3	(Brazil) Reinaldo Varela (Brazil) Gustavo Gugelmin	Toyota Hilux Overdrive	18:42:00
4	(Egypt) Rallye des Pharaons	1	(Qatar) Nasser Al-Attiyah (France) Mathieu Baumel	Mini All4 Racing X-Raid	14:00:02
4	(Egypt) Rallye des Pharaons	2	(Saudi Arabia) Yazeed Al-Rajhi (Germany) Timo Gottschalk	Toyota Hilux Overdrive	14:06:35
4	(Egypt) Rallye des Pharaons	3	(Russia) Vladimir Vasilyev (Russia) Konstantin Zhiltsov	Mini All4 Racing X-Raid	14:08:20
5	(Italy) Italian Baja	1	(Qatar) Nasser Al-Attiyah (France) Mathieu Baumel	Mini All4 Racing X-Raid	3:59:44
5	(Italy) Italian Baja	2	(Brazil) Reinaldo Varela (Brazil) Gustavo Gugelmin	Toyota Hilux Overdrive	4:01:08
5	(Italy) Italian Baja	3	(Russia) Vladimir Vasilyev (Russia) Konstantin Zhiltsov	Toyota Hilux Overdrive	4:03:34
6	(Spain) Baja Aragón	1	(Spain) Nani Roma (Spain) Àlex Haro	Mini All4 Racing X-Raid	8:41:41
6	(Spain) Baja Aragón	2	(Argentina) Orlando Terranova (Argentina) Bernardo Graue	Mini All4 Racing X-Raid	8:44:38
6	(Spain) Baja Aragón	3	(Finland) Mikko Hirvonen (France) Michel Périn	Mini All4 Racing X-Raid	8:45:01
7	(Hungary) Hungarian Baja	1	(Qatar) Nasser Al-Attiyah (France) Mathieu Baumel	Mini All4 Racing X-Raid	6:19:42
7	(Hungary) Hungarian Baja	2	(Netherlands) Bernhard ten Brinke (Belgium) Tom Colsoul	Toyota Hilux Overdrive	6:34:30
7	(Hungary) Hungarian Baja	3	(Czech Republic) Miroslav Zapletal (Poland) Maciej Marton	H3 Evo VII	6:35:31
8	Baja Poland	1	(Poland) Krzysztof Hołowczyc (Poland) Łukasz Kurzeja	Mini All4 Racing X-Raid	4:35:05
8	Baja Poland	2	(Qatar) Nasser Al-Attiyah (France) Matthieu Baumel	Mini All4 Racing X-Raid	4:42:37
8	Baja Poland	3	(Netherlands) Bernhard ten Brinke (Belgium) Tom Colsoul	Toyota Hilux Overdrive	4:43:58
9	(Morocco) Rallye OiLibya du Maroc	1	(Qatar) Nasser Al-Attiyah (France) Matthieu Baumel	Mini All4 Racing X-Raid	14:18:18
9	(Morocco) Rallye OiLibya du Maroc	2	(Russia) Vladimir Vasilyev (Russia) Konstantin Zhiltsov	Toyota Hilux Overdrive	14:35:03
9	(Morocco) Rallye OiLibya du Maroc	3	(Saudi Arabia) Yazeed Al-Rajhi (Germany) Timo Gottschalk	Toyota Hilux Overdrive	14:35:32
10	(Portugal) Baja de Portalegre 500	1	(Portugal) Ricardo Porém (Portugal) Jorge Monteiro_	Toyota Hilux Overdrive	5:31:18
10	(Portugal) Baja de Portalegre 500	2	(Portugal) Miguel Barbosa (Portugal) Miguel Ramalho	Mitsubishi Racing Lancer	5:42:12
10	(Portugal) Baja de Portalegre 500	3	(Portugal) João Ramos (Portugal) Vítor de Jesus	Toyota Hilux Overdrive	5:47:28

== Championship standings ==
In order to score points in the Cup classifications, competitors must register with the FIA before the entry closing date of the first rally/baja entered.

Points system

- Points for final positions are awarded as per the following table:

Position	1st	2nd	3rd	4th	5th	6th	7th	8th	9th	10th
Overall points	25	18	15	12	10	8	6	4	2	1
T1/T2/T3 Points	5	3	1	0						
Double points are applied to Cross Country rallies

=== Drivers' championship ===
Any driver is required to participate in at least one Baja and one Cross-Country event in order to be able to score points for the FIA World Cup.

Pos	Driver	RUS (Russia)	ABU (United Arab Emirates)	QAT (Qatar)	EGY (Egypt)	ITA (Italy)	ESP (Spain)	HUN (Hungary)	POL (Poland)	MAR (Morocco)	POR (Portugal)	Points
1	(Qatar) Nasser Al-Attiyah			1^{60}	1^{60}	1^{30}		1^{30}	2^{21}	1^{60}		261
2	(Russia) Vladimir Vasilyev	2^{21}	1^{60}	2^{42}	3^{32}	3^{16}			6^{8}	2^{42}		221
3	(Brazil) Reinaldo Varela	3^{16}		3^{32}	6^{16}	2^{21}	4^{12}					97
4	(Poland) Marek Dąbrowski	9^{2}	5^{20}	5^{20}	4^{24}	4^{12}	8^{4}	Ret	5^{10}			92
5	(Czech Republic) Miroslav Zapletal	4^{12}	18	4^{24}	5^{20}	5^{10}	12	3^{16}	9^{2}			84
6	(Netherlands) Erik van Loon	5^{10}	2^{42}		7^{12}		6^{8}		11			72
7	(United Kingdom) Harry Hunt		3^{32}							7^{12}		44
8	(Netherlands) Bernhard ten Brinke							2^{21}	3^{16}	9^{4}		41
9	(Poland) Adam Malysz		7^{12}	6^{16}					8^{4}	8^{8}		40
10	(Kazakhstan) Yuriy Sazonov	8^{4}		7^{12}	8^{8}	8^{4}	31	6^{8}	16	10^{2}		38
11	(Argentina) Orlando Terranova		6^{16}				2^{21}					37
12	(Finland) Mikko Hirvonen						3^{16}			5^{20}		36
13	(Peru) Raul Orlandini			13^{6}	10^{12}	11^{5}	16^{1}		13^{3}	13^{6}		33
14	(Kazakhstan) Denis Berezovskiy	11^{5}	14^{2}		13^{6}	14^{3}	13^{3}	9^{7}	12^{5}			31
15	(Portugal) Ricardo Porém										1^{30}	30
	(Spain) Nani Roma						1^{30}					30
Pos	Driver	RUS (Russia)	ABU (United Arab Emirates)	QAT (Qatar)	EGY (Egypt)	ITA (Italy)	ESP (Spain)	HUN (Hungary)	POL (Poland)	MAR (Morocco)	POR (Portugal)	Points

A total of 79 drivers have scored championship points.
