= 2016 FIA Cross Country Rally World Cup =

2016 FIA Cross Country Rally World Cup
Previous:	2015	Next:	2017

The 2016 FIA Cross Country Rally World Cup season is the 24th season of the FIA Cross Country Rally World Cup.

== Calendar ==
The calendar for the 2016 season features nine rallies. Some of the rallies are also part of the FIM Cross-Country Rallies World Championship and the FIM Bajas World Cup.

The six Bajas award 30 points to the winner, whereas the other four events are worth 60 points for the winner.

Round	Dates	Rally name
1	19–22 February	Baja Russia Northern Forest
2	3–7 April	(United Arab Emirates) Abu Dhabi Desert Challenge
3	18–22 April	(Qatar) Sealine Cross-Country Rally
4	23–26 June	(Italy) Italian Baja
5	22–24 July	(Spain) Baja Aragón
6	11–14 August	(Hungary) Hungarian Baja
7	25–28 August	Baja Poland
8	1–7 October	(Morocco) Rallye OiLibya du Maroc
9	27–29 October	(Portugal) Baja de Portalegre 500

== Notable teams and drivers ==
Constructor	Car	Team	Driver	Co-driver	Category	Rounds
BMW	BMW X3	(Russia) G-Energy Team	(Russia) Victor Khoroshavtsev	(Russia) Andrey Samarin	T1	1
BMW	BMW X6RR	(Hungary) Fazekas Motorsport	(Hungary) Károly Fazekas	(Hungary) Zoltán Garamvölgyi	T1	2
CBRA	CBRA X-Raid	(United Kingdom) X-Raid Team	(Germany) Jutta Kleinschmidt	(Sweden) Tina Thörner	T1	2–3
Chevrolet	Chevrolet Buggy	(Spain) 4WD Jaton Racing	(Qatar) Mohammed Al Mannai	(Qatar) Kamal Khoder	T1	2–3
Ford	Ford Ranger	(Germany) South Racing	(Chile) Hernán Garces	(Chile) Juan Pablo Latrach	T1	3
Ford	Ford F150	(Latvia) RE Autoklub	(Russia) Alexander Terentyev	(Russia) Alexey Bercut	T2	1
Ford	Ford Raptor	(Poland) R-Six Team	(Poland) Jarosław Kazberuk	(Poland) Robert Szustkowski	T2	3
Ford	Ford Raptor	(Poland) R-Six Team	(Poland) Robert Szustkowski	(Poland) Jarosław Kazberuk	T2	2
Fornasari	Fornasari Buggy	(United Arab Emirates) Nooh Buhumaid	(United Arab Emirates) Nooh Buhumaid	(United Arab Emirates) Imad Nabhan	T1	2
GAZ	GAZ A22R23	(Russia) GAZ Raid Sport	(Russia) Alexander Kostrukov	(Russia) Yevgeny Pavlov	T1	1
G-Force	G-Force Proto	(Russia) G-Force Motorsport	(Brazil) Reinaldo Varela	(Brazil) Gustavo Gugelmín	T1	1
G-Force	G-Force Proto NL	(Russia) New Generation Racing Team	(Russia) Andrey Novikov	(Russia) Vladimir Novikov	T1	1
G-Force	G-Force Proto NL	(Russia) New Generation Racing Team	(Russia) Andrey Rudskoy	(Russia) Yevgeny Zagorodnyuk	T1	1–2
Hummer	Hummer H3 Evo VIII	(Kazakhstan) MobilEx Racing Team	(Kazakhstan) Yuriy Sazonov	(Russia) Dmytro Tsyro	T1	2–3
Hummer	Hummer H3 Evo V	(Kazakhstan) MobilEx Racing Team	(Kazakhstan) Yerden Shagirov	(Kazakhstan) Aslan Sakhimov	T1	2
Hummer	Hummer H3 Evo V	(Kazakhstan) MobilEx Racing Team	(Kazakhstan) Yerden Shagirov	(Kazakhstan) Vitaliy Yevtyekhov	T1	3
Jeep	Jeep Buggy	(Qatar) Abdulla Al Rabban	(Qatar) Abdulla Al Rabban	(United Arab Emirates) Ali Assan Obaid	T1	2–3
Land Rover	Land Rover Defender	(Qatar) Jamal Fakhro	(Qatar) Jamal Fakhro	(Qatar) Amr Elaouby	T1	3
Mini	Mini All4 Racing X-Raid	(United Arab Emirates) Abu Dhabi Racing	(United Arab Emirates) Khalid Al Qassimi	(United Arab Emirates) Khalid Al Kendi	T1	2
Mini	Mini All4 Racing X-Raid	(Russia) G-Energy Team	(Russia) Vladimir Vasilyev	(Russia) Konstantin Zhiltsov	T1	1–3
Mini	Mini All4 Racing X-Raid	(United Kingdom) X-Raid Team	(Saudi Arabia) Yazeed Al-Rajhi	(Germany) Timo Gottschalk	T1	2–3
Mini	Mini All4 Racing X-Raid	(United Kingdom) X-Raid Team	(Finland) Mikko Hirvonen	(France) Michel Périn	T1	2–3
Mini	Mini All4 Racing X-Raid	(United Kingdom) X-Raid Team	(United States) Bryce Menzies	(Germany) Andreas Schulz	T1	2
Mini	Mini All4 Racing X-Raid	(United Kingdom) X-Raid Team	(Portugal) Ricardo Porem	(Belgium) Tom Colsoul	T1	3
Mini	Mini All4 Racing X-Raid	(United Kingdom) X-Raid Team	(Poland) Jakub Przygoński	(Belgium) Tom Colsoul	T1	2
Mini	Mini All4 Racing X-Raid	(United Kingdom) X-Raid Team	(Germany) Stephan Schott	(Germany) Holm Schmidt	T1	2
Mitsubishi	Mitsubishi L200	(Latvia) Aldis Vilcāns	(Latvia) Aldis Vilcāns	(Belarus) Andrei Rudnitski	T1	1
Mitsubishi	Mitsubishi Pajero	(Italy) Stefano Marrini	(Italy) Stefano Marrini	(Italy) Giacomo Tognarini	T1	3
Nissan	Nissan Datsun	(Russia) PEK Team	(Russia) Evgeniy Firsov	(Russia) Vadim Filatov	T1	1
Nissan	Nissan Frontier	(Russia) PEK Team	(Russia) Dmitriy Ievlev	(Russia) Aleksey Shaposhnikov	T1	1
Nissan	Nissan NP300 Pick-up	(Russia) ATT Racing	(Russia) Vladimir Frolov	(Russia) Igor Petenko	T1	1
Nissan	Nissan NP300 Pick-up	(Russia) Aleksey Cherkesov	(Russia) Aleksey Cherkesov	(Russia) Artem Shevelev	T1	1
Nissan	Nissan Pathfinder	(United Arab Emirates) Mohammed Al Mansoori	(United Arab Emirates) Mohammed Al Mansoori	(United Arab Emirates) Saeed Al Hashmi	T1	2
Nissan	Nissan Pathfinder	(Italy) Technosport SPA	(Italy) Valentina Casella	(Italy) Giulia Maroni	T1	2
Nissan	Nissan Patrol	(Saudi Arabia) Ahmed Al Qashami	(Saudi Arabia) Ahmed Al Qashami	(Saudi Arabia) Wleed Al Fiuam	T1	2
Nissan	Nissan Patrol	(Saudi Arabia) Ahmed Al Qashami	(Saudi Arabia) Ahmed Al Qashami	(Saudi Arabia) Osama Al Sanad	T1	2
Nissan	Nissan Patrol	(Saudi Arabia) Khaled Al Feraihi	(Saudi Arabia) Khaled Al Feraihi	(Oman) Abdulhaleem Al Busaidi	T1	2–3
Nissan	Nissan Patrol	(United Arab Emirates) Matar Al Mansoori	(United Arab Emirates) Matar Al Mansoori	(United Arab Emirates) Shahin Al Ali	T1	2
Nissan	Nissan Patrol	(United Arab Emirates) NewTrix Racing	(United Arab Emirates) Ian Barker	(United Arab Emirates) Sheila Hutton-Barker	T1	2
Nissan	Nissan Patrol	(United Arab Emirates) Sabertooth Motorsports	(United Arab Emirates) Thomas Bell	(United Arab Emirates) Patrick McMurren	T1	2
Nissan	Nissan Patrol	(United Arab Emirates) Salem Y. Al Mansoori	(United Arab Emirates) Salem Y. Al Mansoori	(United Arab Emirates) Salem M. Al Mansoori	T1	2
Nissan	Nissan Pickup	(United Arab Emirates) Yahya Al Helei	(United Arab Emirates) Yahya Al Helei	(Qatar) Nasser Al Kuwari	T1	2
Nissan	Nissan Navara Double Cab D40	(Poland) Grzegorz Czarnecki	(Poland) Grzegorz Czarnecki	(Poland) Michał Bojar	T2	1
Nissan	Nissan Patrol	(Qatar) Adel Hussain Abdulla	(Qatar) Adel Hussain Abdulla	(Egypt) Hakam Mohamed Rabeia	T2	2
Nissan	Nissan Patrol	(Qatar) Adel Hussain Abdulla	(Qatar) Adel Hussain Abdulla	(Qatar) Nasser S. Al Kuwari	T2	3
Nissan	Nissan Patrol	(United Arab Emirates) Joseph Rosso	(United Arab Emirates) Joseph Rosso	(France) Guy Leveneu	T2	2
Nissan	Nissan Patrol	(United Arab Emirates) Mansoor Al Helei	(United Arab Emirates) Mansoor Al Helei	(United Arab Emirates) Suhal Al Ali	T2	2
Nissan	Nissan Patrol	(Qatar) Mohammed Al Harqan	(Qatar) Mohammed Al Harqan	(United Arab Emirates) Arif Yousuf Mohammed	T2	2
Nissan	Nissan Patrol	Qatar Motor & Motorcycle Federation	(France) Charlotte Berton	(France) Antonia de Roissard	T2	3
Nissan	Nissan Patrol	Qatar Motor & Motorcycle Federation	(New Zealand) Emma Gilmour	(Netherlands) Lisette Bakker	T2	3
Nissan	Nissan Patrol	Qatar Motor & Motorcycle Federation	(Spain) Cristina Gutiérrez	(South Africa) Sandra Labuscagne	T2	3
Nissan	Nissan Patrol Y62	(United Arab Emirates) Emil Khneisser	(United Arab Emirates) Emil Khneisser	(Russia) Aleksei Kuzmich	T2	2–3
Polaris	Polaris RZR 1000	(Poland) Aron Domżała	(Poland) Aron Domżała	(Poland) Szymon Gospodarczyk	T3	1–3
Polaris	Polaris RZR 1000	(Italy) Carlo Cinotto	(Italy) Carlo Cinotto	(Italy) Marco Arnoletti	T3	3
Polaris	Polaris RZR 1000	(Kazakhstan) Dmitry Pitulov	(Kazakhstan) Dmitry Pitulov	(Ukraine) Vadym Prytuliak	T3	2
Polaris	Polaris RZR 1000	(Italy) Eugenio Amos	(Italy) Eugenio Amos	(Spain) Rafael Tornabell Córdoba	T3	2
Polaris	Polaris RZR 1000	(Russia) G-Energy Team	(Russia) Rustem Galimov	(Russia) Igor Petenko	T3	2
Polaris	Polaris RZR 1000	(Russia) G-Energy Team	(Russia) Ravil Maganov	(Russia) Kirill Shubin	T3	1–3
Polaris	Polaris RZR 1000	(Poland) Maciej Domżała	(Poland) Maciej Domżała	(Poland) Boba Bartłomiej	T3	2
Polaris	Polaris RZR 1000	(Italy) Michele Cinotto	(Italy) Michele Cinotto	(Italy) Fulvio Zini	T3	3
Polaris	Polaris RZR 1000	(Italy) Pietro Cinotto	(Italy) Pietro Cinotto	(Italy) Maurizio Dominella	T3	3
Polaris	Polaris RZR 1000	(United Arab Emirates) Polaris Racing Team UAE	(United Arab Emirates) Ahmed Al Maqoodi	(United Arab Emirates) Obaid Al Kitbe	T3	2
Polaris	Polaris XP 900	(United Arab Emirates) Michel Fadel	(United Arab Emirates) Michel Fadel	(United Arab Emirates) Craig Tyson	T3	2
Predator	Predator X18S	(United Arab Emirates) Georgy Gomshiashvili	(United Arab Emirates) Georgy Gomshiashvili	(United Arab Emirates) Jordan Beale	T1	2
Predator	Predator X18S	(Oman) Zakariya Al Shanfari	(Oman) Zakariya Al Shanfari	(Oman) Saif Al Hinai	T1	2
Rage	Rage Comet	(United Arab Emirates) Atif Al Zarouni	(United Arab Emirates) Atif Al Zarouni	(United Arab Emirates) Ahmed Al Zarouni	T3	2
SMG	SMG Buggy	(France) Team SRT	(France) Yannick Commagnac	(France) Hervé Lavergne	T1	2
SMG	SMG Buggy	(France) Team SRT	(France) Mathieu Serradori	(France) Didier Haquette	T1	2
Toyota	Toyota FJ Cruiser	(Japan) Team Dr. Keiko	(Japan) Keiko Hamaguchi	(Italy) Umberto Fiori	T1	2
Toyota	Toyota Hilux	(Spain) 4WD Jaton Racing	(Colombia) Antonio Marmolejo	(Argentina) Eduardo Blanco	T1	2
Toyota	Toyota Hilux	(Qatar) Khalifa Al-Attiyah	(Qatar) Khalifa Al-Attiyah	(France) Jean-Michel Polato	T1	3
Toyota	Toyota Hilux	(Kazakhstan) MobilEx Racing Team	(Kazakhstan) Kanat Shagirov	(Kazakhstan) Vitaly Yevtyekhov	T1	2
Toyota	Toyota Hilux	(Germany) South Racing	(Argentina) Fernando Álvarez Castellano	(Argentina) Luciano Gennoni	T1	1–2
Toyota	Toyota Hilux	(Germany) South Racing	(Venezuela) Nunzio Coffaro	(Venezuela) Daniel Meneses	T1	1
Toyota	Toyota Hilux	(Venezuela) Team Azimut	(Venezuela) Nunzio Coffaro	(Venezuela) Daniel Meneses	T1	2
Toyota	Toyota Hilux Overdrive	(Qatar) Nasser Al-Attiyah	(Qatar) Nasser Al-Attiyah	(France) Mathieu Baumel	T1	2–3
Toyota	Toyota Hilux Overdrive	(Poland) Orlen Team	(Poland) Marek Dąbrowski	(Poland) Jacek Czachor	T1	1–3
Toyota	Toyota Land Cruiser	(Russia) Maksim Kirpilev	(Russia) Maksim Kirpilev	(Russia) Vadim Shmaylov	T1	1
Toyota	Toyota KDJ 120	(Russia) Maksim Kirpilev	(Russia) Maksim Kirpilev	(Russia) Vadim Shmaylov	T2	3
Toyota	Toyota Land Cruiser	(United Arab Emirates) Michael Ziegler	(United Arab Emirates) Michael Ziegler	(United Arab Emirates) Behesitti Faramaz	T2	2
Toyota	Toyota Land Cruiser 120	(France) Marco Piana	(France) Marco Piana	(Switzerland) Steven Griener	T2	2
Toyota	Toyota Land Cruiser 155	(Spain) 4WD Jaton Racing	(Peru) Raúl Orlandini	(Spain) Xavier Blanco	T2	2–3
Toyota	Toyota Land Cruiser 200	(Spain) 4WD Jaton Racing	(Saudi Arabia) Saleh Abdullah	(United Kingdom) Michael Orr	T2	2–3
Toyota	Toyota Land Cruiser 200	Offroad Kazakhstan	(Kazakhstan) Marat Abykayev	(Kazakhstan) Andrey Chipenko	T2	2
Toyota	Toyota Land Cruiser 200	(Saudi Arabia) Yasir Seaidan	(Saudi Arabia) Yasir Seaidan	(France) Sébastien Delaunay	T2	2–3
Toyota	Toyota Land Cruiser V8	(Italy) Pietro Fogliani	(Italy) Pietro Fogliani		T2	1
Toyota	Toyota Prado	(Qatar) Jaralla Jahman	(Qatar) Jaralla Jahman	(Qatar) Feras Alouh	T2	2
Toyota	Toyota Prado	(Qatar) Sahara Team	(Qatar) Mohammed Al Harqan	(Qatar) Feras Alouh	T2	3
Volkswagen	Volkswagen 7JO	(Russia) PEK Team	(Latvia) Māris Neikšāns	(Russia) Anton Nikolaev	T1	1
Volkswagen	Volkswagen Amarok	(Slovenia) ABC Sport	(Slovenia) Darij Novak	(Slovenia) Darko Pelijhan	T1	2
Yamaha	Yamaha YXZ1000	(United Arab Emirates) Khalid Al Jafla	(United Arab Emirates) Khalid Al Jafla	(United Arab Emirates) Ahmad Malik	T3	2

== Results ==
Round	Rally name	Podium finishers			
Round	Rally name	Rank	Driver	Car	Time
1	Baja Russia Northern Forest	1	(Latvia) Māris Neikšāns (Russia) Anton Nikolaev	Volkswagen 7JO	3:49:42
1	Baja Russia Northern Forest	2	(Russia) Vladimir Vasilyev (Russia) Konstantin Zhiltsov	Mini All4 Racing X-Raid	3:50:55
1	Baja Russia Northern Forest	3	(Russia) Andrey Novikov (Russia) Vladimir Novikov	G-Force Proto NL	4:06:00
2	(United Arab Emirates) Abu Dhabi Desert Challenge	1	(Qatar) Nasser Al-Attiyah (France) Mathieu Baumel	Toyota Hilux Overdrive	17:14:49
2	(United Arab Emirates) Abu Dhabi Desert Challenge	2	(Saudi Arabia) Yazeed Al-Rajhi (Germany) Timo Gottschalk	Mini All4 Racing X-Raid	17:47:02
2	(United Arab Emirates) Abu Dhabi Desert Challenge	3	(Finland) Mikko Hirvonen (France) Michel Périn	Mini All4 Racing X-Raid	17:53:02
3	(Qatar) Sealine Cross-Country Rally	1	(Qatar) Nasser Al-Attiyah (France) Mathieu Baumel	Toyota Hilux Overdrive	15:15:51
3	(Qatar) Sealine Cross-Country Rally	2	(Saudi Arabia) Yazeed Al-Rajhi (Germany) Timo Gottschalk	Mini All4 Racing X-Raid	15:27:54
3	(Qatar) Sealine Cross-Country Rally	3	(Russia) Vladimir Vasilyev (Russia) Konstantin Zhiltsov	Mini All4 Racing X-Raid	16:27:04
4	(Italy) Italian Baja	1	(Qatar) Nasser Al-Attiyah (France) Mathieu Baumel	Toyota Hilux Overdrive	3:37:13
4	(Italy) Italian Baja	2	(Russia) Vladimir Vasilyev (Russia) Konstantin Zhiltsov	Mini All4 Racing X-Raid	3:39:22
4	(Italy) Italian Baja	3	(Russia) Boris Gadasin (Russia) Aleksei Kuzmich	Mini All4 Racing X-Raid	3:42:55
5	(Spain) Baja Aragón	1	(Qatar) Nasser Al-Attiyah (France) Mathieu Baumel	Toyota Hilux Overdrive	6:59:59
5	(Spain) Baja Aragón	2	(Spain) Carlos Sainz (Spain) Lucas Cruz	Peugeot 2008 DKR	7:00:18
5	(Spain) Baja Aragón	3	(Finland) Mikko Hirvonen (France) Michel Périn	Mini All4 Racing X-Raid	7:03:29
6	(Hungary) Hungarian Baja	1	(Finland) Mikko Hirvonen (France) Michel Périn	Mini All4 Racing X-Raid	5:19:07
6	(Hungary) Hungarian Baja	2	(Russia) Boris Gadasin (Russia) Evgeniy Zagorodnuk	G-Force Proto NL	6:11:44
6	(Hungary) Hungarian Baja	3	(Hungary) Gabor Husasz	Yamaha Klement Mosquito	6:16:33
7	Baja Poland	1	(Qatar) Nasser Al-Attiyah (France) Mathieu Baumel	Toyota Hilux Overdrive	4:59:16
7	Baja Poland	2	(Poland) Krzysztof Holowczyc (Poland) Lukasz Kurzeja	Mini All4 Racing X-Raid	5:00:37
7	Baja Poland	3	(Poland) Marek Dabrowski (Poland) Jacek Czachor	Toyota Hilux Overdrive	5:07:35
8	(Morocco) Rallye OiLibya du Maroc	1	(Qatar) Nasser Al-Attiyah (France) Mathieu Baumel	Toyota Hilux Overdrive	12:28:28
8	(Morocco) Rallye OiLibya du Maroc	2	(Spain) Carlos Sainz (Spain) Lucas Cruz	Peugeot 3008 DKR	12:40:36
8	(Morocco) Rallye OiLibya du Maroc	3	(Russia) Vladimir Vasilyev (Russia) Konstantin Zhiltsov	Mini All4 Racing X-Raid	13:04:37
9	(Portugal) Baja de Portalegre 500	1	(Portugal) Ricardo Porém (Portugal) Filipe Palmeiro	Mini All4 Racing X-Raid	5:38:16
9	(Portugal) Baja de Portalegre 500	2	(Spain) Xavier Pons (Argentina) Ruben Garcia	Ford Ranger	5:43:08
9	(Portugal) Baja de Portalegre 500	3	(Portugal) Nuno Matos (Portugal) Filipe Serra	Opel Mokka Proto	5:43:49

== Championship standings ==
In order to score points in the Cup classifications, competitors must register with the FIA before the entry closing date of the first rally/baja entered.

Points system

- Points for final positions are awarded as per the following table:

Position	1st	2nd	3rd	4th	5th	6th	7th	8th	9th	10th
Overall points	25	18	15	12	10	8	6	4	2	1
T1/T2/T3 Points	5	3	1	0						
Double points are applied to Cross Country rallies

=== Drivers' championship ===
Any driver is required to participate in at least one Baja and one Cross-Country event in order to be able to score points for the FIA World Cup.

Pos	Driver	RUS (Russia)	ABU (United Arab Emirates)	QAT (Qatar)	ITA (Italy)	ESP (Spain)	HUN (Hungary)	POL (Poland)	MAR (Morocco)	POR (Portugal)	Points
1	(Qatar) Nasser Al-Attiyah		1^{60}	1^{60}	1^{30}	1^{30}		1^{30}	1^{60}		270
2	(Russia) Vladimir Vasilyev	2^{21}	Ret	3^{32}	2^{21}				3^{32}		106
3	(Saudi Arabia) Yazeed Al-Rajhi		2^{42}	2^{42}	6^{8}						92
4	(Finland) Mikko Hirvonen		3^{32}			3^{16}	1^{30}				78
5	(Spain) Carlos Sainz					2^{21}			2^{42}		63
6	(Poland) Marek Dabrowski	13	8^{8}	6^{16}	3^{16}			3^{16}			56
7	(United States) Bryce Menzies		4^{24}		5^{10}		2^{21}				55
8	(Poland) Jakub Przygonski		5^{20}					4^{12}	5^{20}		52
9	(Portugal) Ricardo Porem			7^{12}						1^{30}	42
9	(Poland) Aron Domzala	7^{11}	11^{10}	13^{2}	12^{5}	33	8^{7}	11^{5}	14^{2}	34	42
11	(Argentina) Orlando Terranova					5^{10}			4^{24}		34
11	(Kazakhstan) Yuriy Sazonov		9^{4}	4^{24}	7^{6}						34
13	(Saudi Arabia) Yasir Seaidan		14^{6}	9^{14}	11^{5}		9^{7}	24			32
14	(Qatar) Adel Hussain Abdulla		13^{10}	18	29	13^{5}	10^{4}	26		11^{5}	24
15	(Italy) Carlo Cinotto			11^{10}	13^{3}	11^{5}	12^{1}	15^{3}	30		22
16	(Germany) Jutta Kleinschmidt		24	5^{20}		18					20
17	(France) Mathieu Serradori		6^{16}		19	9^{2}		25			18
18	(Italy) Pietro Cinotto			12^{6}	14^{1}		18		11^{10}		17
Pos	Driver	RUS (Russia)	ABU (United Arab Emirates)	QAT (Qatar)	ITA (Italy)	ESP (Spain)	HUN (Hungary)	POL (Poland)	MAR (Morocco)	POR (Portugal)	Points

=== Teams' championship ===
Any team is required to participate in at least one Baja and one Cross-Country event in order to be able to score points for the FIA World Cup.

Pos	Driver	RUS (Russia)	ABU (United Arab Emirates)	QAT (Qatar)	ITA (Italy)	ESP (Spain)	HUN (Hungary)	POL (Poland)	MAR (Morocco)	POR (Portugal)	Points
1	(Qatar) Nasser Sale Al-Attiyah Team		1^{60}	1^{60}	1^{30}	1^{30}		1^{30}	1^{60}		270
2	(Germany) X-Raid Team		2^{42}	2^{42}	5^{10}	3^{16}	1^{30}	2^{21}	4^{24}	1^{30}	215
3	(Russia) G-Energy Team	2^{21}		3^{32}	2^{21}				3^{32}		106
4	(Poland) Orlen Team		5^{20}	6^{16}	3^{16}			3^{16}			68
5	(France) Team Peugeot Total					2^{21}			2^{42}		63
6	(Germany) DMAS South Racing			8^{8}		4^{12}				2^{21}	41
