= 2017 Rallye OiLibya du Maroc =

- Part of the Rallye OiLibya du Maroc
- Host country: Morocco
- Dates run: 4 October 2017–10 October 2017
- Start: (Morocco) Agadir
- Finish: (Morocco) Agadir
- Stages: 5

Results
- Cars winner: (Qatar) Nasser Al-Attiyah; Toyota Gazoo Racing
- Bikes winner: (Austria) Matthias Walkner; Red Bull KTM Factory Team

The 2017 Rallye OiLibya du Maroc was the 18th edition of the Rallye OiLibya du Maroc and was run in Morocco from 4 to 10 October 2017.

== Results ==
=== Auto ===
Final rankings after 5 stages on 10 October 2017.

Rank	Driver	Co-driver	Car	Diff. 1st
1st place, gold medalist(s)	(Qatar) Nasser Al Attiyah	(France) Mathieu Baumel	Toyota Hilux Overdrive	
2nd place, silver medalist(s)	(France) Sébastien Loeb	(Monaco) Daniel Elena	Peugeot 3008 DKR	00:07:55
3rd place, bronze medalist(s)	(Spain) Nani Roma	(Spain) Alex Haro	Mini All4 Racing	00:24:45
4	(Poland) Jakub Przygonski	(Belgium) Tom Colsoul	Mini All4 Racing	00:29:38
5	(Russia) Vladimir Vasilyev	(Russia) Contentin Zhiltsov	Mini All4 Racing	00:43:25
6	(Poland) Aron Domzala	(Poland) Marton Majiec	Toyota Hilux Overdrive	00:56:34
7	(Finland) Mikko Hirvonen	(Germany) Andreas Schulz	Mini All4 Racing	01:06:13
8	(United States) Bryce Menzies	(United States) Pete Mortensen	Mini All4 Racing	01:10:52
9	(Argentina) Orlando Terranova	(Argentina) Bernardo Graue	Mini All4 Racing	01:27:03
10	(Spain) Carlos Sainz	(Spain) Lucas Cruz	Peugeot 3008 DKR	01:28:02

=== Moto ===
Final rankings after 5 stages on 10 October 2017.

Rank	Driver	Bike	Diff. 1st
1st place, gold medalist(s)	(Austria) Matthias Walkner	KTM 450 Rally	
2nd place, silver medalist(s)	(Argentina) Kevin Benavides	Honda CRF 450 Rally	00:13:42
3rd place, bronze medalist(s)	(United States) Ricky Brabec	Honda CRF 450 Rally	00:16:58
4	(France) Antoine Meo	KTM 450 Rally	00:18:27
