= 2019 FIA World Cup for Cross-Country Bajas =

International Sports Competition

2019 FIA World Cup for Cross-Country Bajas
Previous:	2018	Next:	2020

The 2019 FIA World Cup for Cross-Country Bajas was the first season of the reformed FIA World Cup for Cross-Country Bajas; an annual competition for baja-style rally raid events for cars, buggies, side-by-sides, and trucks held in multiple countries. The championship was last held in 2010, after which the baja events were combined with the longer cross-country rallies to form the FIA World Cup for Cross-Country Rallies.

== Calendar ==
The 2019 edition of the world cup featured eight cross-country baja events. The longer cross-country rally events remained part of the regular Cross-Country Rally World Cup. Some events on the schedule were shared with the 2019 FIM Bajas World Cup.

The FIA awarded the world cup to drivers, co-drivers, and teams competing in the T1 category; whilst drivers and teams in the T2 and T3 categories were awarded FIA cups.

Round	Dates	Rally name	Ref.
1	14–17 February	Baja Russia - Northern Forest	
2	7-9 March	(United Arab Emirates) Dubai International Baja	
3	20-23 June	(Italy) Italian Baja	
4	25-28 July	(Spain) Baja España Aragón	
5	8-11 August	(Hungary) Hungarian Baja	
6	29 August - 1 September	Baja Poland	
7	19-21 September	Jordan Baja	
8	24-26 October	(Portugal) Baja de Portalegre 500	

== Notable teams and drivers ==
Constructor	Car	Team	Driver	Co-driver	Category	Rounds
Can-Am	Can-Am Maverick X3	(Russia) Zavidovo Racing Team	(Russia) Fedor Vorobyev	(Russia) Kirill Shubin	T3	1-2
Can-Am	Can-Am Maverick X3	(Oman) AZ Racing Team	(Oman) Abdullah Al Zubair	(Russia) Faisal Al Raisi	T3	1-2
Ford	Ford Raptor RS Cross Country	(Czech Republic) MP-Sports	(Czech Republic) Martin Prokop	(Czech Republic) David Kripal	T1	2
Ford	Ford F150	(Czech Republic) OFFROADSPORT	(Czech Republic) Miroslav Zapletal	(Slovakia) Marek Sykora	T1	2
G-Force	G-Force BARS	(Russia) G-Force Motorsport	(Russia) Andrey N	(Russia) Vladimir N	T1	1-2
Hummer	Hummer H3	(Czech Republic) Miroslav Zapletal	(Czech Republic) Miroslav Zapletal	(Slovakia) Marek Sykora	T1	1
Mini	Mini JCW Rally X-Raid	(Russia) VRT	(Russia) Vladimir Vasilyev	(Russia) Konstantin Zhiltsov	T1	1
Mini	Mini JCW Buggy X-Raid	(Poland) Orlen Team/X-Raid	(Poland) Jakub Przygonski	(Germany) Timo Gottschalk	T1	2
Peugeot	Peugeot 3008 DKR	(United Arab Emirates) Abu Dhabi Racing	(United Arab Emirates) Khalid Al Qassimi	(France) Xavier Panseri	T1	2
Polaris	Polaris RZR 1000	(Italy) CR Racing	(Italy) Michele Cinotto	(Italy) Maurizio Dominella	T3	1-2
Toyota	Toyota Hilux	(Lithuania) Pitlane	(Lithuania) Benediktas Vanagas	(Poland) Bartlomiej Boba	T1	2
Toyota	Toyota Hilux	(Finland) RE Autoklubs	(Finland) Tapio Lauronen	(Finland) Toni Lauronen	T1	1
Toyota	Toyota Hilux	(Russia) VRT	(Russia) Vladimir Vasilyev	(Russia) Konstantin Zhiltsov	T1	2
Toyota	Toyota LC 200	(Latvia) VA Motorsports	(Latvia) Aldis Vilcans	(Latvia) Daira Vilcane	T2	1-2

== Results ==
=== Overall ===
Round	Rally name	Podium finishers			
Round	Rally name	Rank	Driver	Car	Time
1	Baja Russia - Northern Forest	1	(Finland) Tapio Lauronen (Finland) Toni Lauronen	Mitsubishi Pajero	5:19:07
1	Baja Russia - Northern Forest	2	(Russia) Vladimir Vasilyev (Russia) Konstantin Zhiltsov	Mini All4 Racing/VRT	5:21:28
1	Baja Russia - Northern Forest	3	(Lithuania) Benediktas Vanagas (Poland) Bartlomiej Boba	Toyota Hilux	5:31:33
2	(United Arab Emirates) Dubai International Baja	1	(Poland) Jakub Przygonski (Germany) Timo Gottschalk	Mini John Cooper Works Buggy	5:15:10
2	(United Arab Emirates) Dubai International Baja	2	(United Arab Emirates) Khalid Al Qassimi (France) Xavier Panseri	Peugeot 3008 DKR	5:16:20
2	(United Arab Emirates) Dubai International Baja	3	(Czech Republic) Martin Prokop (Czech Republic) David Kripal	Ford Raptor RS Cross Country	5:18:22
3	(Italy) Italian Baja	1	(Argentina) Orlando Terranova (Argentina) Ronnie Graue	Mini John Cooper Works Rally	5:17:24
3	(Italy) Italian Baja	2	(Russia) Vladimir Vasilyev (Russia) Konstantin Zhiltsov	Toyota Hilux/VRT	5:21:27
3	(Italy) Italian Baja	3	(Czech Republic) Martin Prokop (Czech Republic) David Kripal	Ford Raptor RS Cross Country	5:36:20
4	(Spain) Baja Aragón	1	(Argentina) Orlando Terranova (Argentina) Ronnie Graue	Mini John Cooper Works Rally	6:21:40
4	(Spain) Baja Aragón	2	(Spain) Nani Roma (Spain) Alex Haro	Mini All4 Racing	6:25:16
4	(Spain) Baja Aragón	3	(Poland) Jakub Przygonski (Germany) Timo Gottschalk	Mini John Cooper Works Rally	5:25:52
5	(Hungary) Hungarian Baja	1	(Argentina) Orlando Terranova (Argentina) Ronnie Graue	Mini John Cooper Works Rally	6:44:54
5	(Hungary) Hungarian Baja	2	(Czech Republic) Martin Prokop (Czech Republic) David Kripal	Ford Raptor RS Cross Country	6:45:31
5	(Hungary) Hungarian Baja	3	(Russia) Vladimir Vasilyev (Russia) Konstantin Zhiltsov	Toyota Hilux/VRT	7:01:23
6	Baja Poland	1	(Poland) Krzysztof Holowczyc (Poland) Lucasz Kuzeja	Mini John Cooper Works Rally	5:35:52
6	Baja Poland	2	(Poland) Jakub Przygonski (Germany) Timo Gottschalk	Mini John Cooper Works Rally	5:42:45
6	Baja Poland	3	(Russia) Vladimir Vasilyev (Russia) Konstantin Zhiltsov	Toyota Hilux/VRT	5:56:29
7	Jordan Baja	1	(Poland) Jakub Przygonski (Germany) Timo Gottschalk	Mini John Cooper Works Rally	5:28:14
7	Jordan Baja	2	(Argentina) Orlando Terranova (Argentina) Ronnie Graue	Mini John Cooper Works Rally	5:32:04
7	Jordan Baja	3	(Russia) Vladimir Vasilyev (Russia) Konstantin Zhiltsov	Mini All4 Racing	5:34:36
8	(Portugal) Baja de Portalegre 500	1	(Argentina) Orlando Terranova (Argentina) Ronnie Graue	Mini John Cooper Works Rally	5:39:24
8	(Portugal) Baja de Portalegre 500	2	(Spain) Nani Roma (Spain) Dani Oliveras	Borgward BX7 DKR EVO	5:42:18
8	(Portugal) Baja de Portalegre 500	3	(Poland) Jakub Przygonski (Germany) Timo Gottschalk	Mini John Cooper Works Rally	5:44:07

=== T2 category ===
Round	Rally name	Podium finishers			
Round	Rally name	Rank	Driver	Car	Time
1	Baja Russia - Northern Forest	1	(Latvia) Aldis Vilcans (Latvia) Daira Vilcan	Toyota LC 200	6:22:19
1	Baja Russia - Northern Forest	2	(Turkmenistan) Muhammetmyrat Gurbanov (Turkmenistan) Shamyrat Gurbanov	Nissan Patrol	7:20:53
1	Baja Russia - Northern Forest	3	(Turkmenistan) Merdan Toylyev (Turkmenistan) Shohrat Toylyev	Nissan Patrol	10:48:40
2	(United Arab Emirates) Dubai International Baja	1	(Russia) Alexander Baranenko (Russia) Alexander Gorkov	Toyota LC 200	21:02:53
2	(United Arab Emirates) Dubai International Baja	2	(Latvia) Aldis Vilcans (Latvia) Daira Vilcan	Toyota LC 200	40:54:59
2	(United Arab Emirates) Dubai International Baja	3			
3	(Italy) Italian Baja	1			
3	(Italy) Italian Baja	2			
3	(Italy) Italian Baja	3			
4	(Spain) Baja Aragón	1	(Portugal) Joao Ferreira (Spain) David Monteiro	Toyota Land Cruiser KDJ155	8:07:51
4	(Spain) Baja Aragón	2	(Portugal) Nuno Corvo (Spain) Alex Haro	Nissan Pathfinder	8:11:12
4	(Spain) Baja Aragón	3	(Portugal) Fernando Barreiros (Portugal) Fernando Barreiros	Isuzu D-Max	8:40:22
5	(Hungary) Hungarian Baja	1	(Romania) Claudiu Barbu (Romania) Paul Spiridon	Nissan Navara	9:50:46
5	(Hungary) Hungarian Baja	2	(Latvia) Aldis Vilcans (Latvia) Daira Vilcan	Toyota LC 200	9:55:06
5	(Hungary) Hungarian Baja	3			
6	(Hungary) Baja Poland	1	(Latvia) Aldis Vilcans (Latvia) Daira Vilcan	Toyota LC 200	7:50:48
6	(Hungary) Baja Poland	2	(Romania) Claudiu Barbu (Romania) Paul Spiridon	Nissan Navara	1.01:26:55
6	(Hungary) Baja Poland	3			
7	Jordan Baja	1			
7	Jordan Baja	2			
7	Jordan Baja	3			
8	(Portugal) Baja de Portalegre 500	1	(Portugal) Joao Ferreira (Spain) David Monteiro	Toyota Land Cruiser KDJ155	6:53:41
8	(Portugal) Baja de Portalegre 500	2	(Portugal) Georgino Pedroso (Portugal) Carlos Silva	Isuzu D-Max	6:58:54
8	(Portugal) Baja de Portalegre 500	3	(Portugal) Eduardo Mota (Portugal) Nuno Sousa	Nissan Pathfinder	7:02:29

=== T3 category ===
Round	Rally name	Podium finishers			
Round	Rally name	Rank	Driver	Car	Time
1	Baja Russia - Northern Forest	1	(Italy) Michele Cinotto (Italy) Maurizio Dominella	Polaris RZR 1000	6:23:02
1	Baja Russia - Northern Forest	2	(Oman) Abdullah Al Zubair (Oman) Faisal Al Raisi	BRP Maverick X3	6:44:01
1	Baja Russia - Northern Forest	3	(Russia) Dmitrii Ponomarenko (Russia) Dmitrii Karpov	Polaris Ranger RZR XP	6:47:03
2	(United Arab Emirates) Dubai International Baja	1	(Qatar) Adel Abdulla (France) Jean Michel Polato	Can-Am Maverick X3	6:14:33
2	(United Arab Emirates) Dubai International Baja	2	(Russia) Fedor Vorobyev (Russia) Kirill Shubin	Can-Am Maverick X3	6:40:30
2	(United Arab Emirates) Dubai International Baja	3	(Spain) Santiago Navarro (Spain) Pedro Gabriel Lopez	Can-Am Maverick X3	6:46:17
3	(Italy) Italian Baja	1	(Russia) Fedor Vorobyev (Russia) Kirill Shubin	Can-Am Maverick X3	5:09:11
3	(Italy) Italian Baja	2	(Spain) Santi Navarro (Spain) Marc Sola	Can-Am Maverick X3	6:14:13
3	(Italy) Italian Baja	3	(Italy) Michele Cinotto (Italy) Maurizio Dominella	Polaris RZR 1000	6:33:10
4	(Spain) Baja Aragón	1	(Spain) Santi Navarro (Spain) Marc Sola	Can-Am Maverick X3	7:4:12
4	(Spain) Baja Aragón	2	(Russia) Alexander Dorosinskiy (Russia) Dimitry Pavlov	Can-Am Maverick X3	7:4:17
4	(Spain) Baja Aragón	3	(Spain) Gerard Farres (Spain) Armand Monleon	Can-Am Maverick X3	8:40:22
5	(Hungary) Hungarian Baja	1	(Russia) Fedor Vorobyev (Russia) Kirill Shubin	Can-Am Maverick X3	7:57:19
5	(Hungary) Hungarian Baja	2	(Spain) Santi Navarro (Spain) Marc Sola	Can-Am Maverick X3	8:16:16
5	(Hungary) Hungarian Baja	3	(Russia) Alexander Dorosinskiy (Russia) Dimitry Pavlov	Can-Am Maverick X3	8:57:22
6	Baja Poland	1	(Russia) Fedor Vorobyev (Russia) Kirill Shubin	Can-Am Maverick X3	6:52:38
6	Baja Poland	2	(Italy) Michele Cinotto (Italy) Maurizio Dominella	Polaris RZR 1000	17:02:54
6	Baja Poland	3	(France) Eric Abel (France) Christian Manez	Polaris RZR 1000	17:27:55
7	Jordan Baja	1	(Russia) Fedor Vorobyev (Russia) Kirill Shubin	Can-Am Maverick X3	6:34:55
7	Jordan Baja	2	(Italy) Michele Cinotto (Italy) Maurizio Dominella	Polaris RZR 1000	7:44:15
7	Jordan Baja	3	(Saudi Arabia) Saleh Al-Saif (Jordan) Moath Al-Arja	Can-Am Maverick X3	11:11:20
8	(Portugal) Baja de Portalegre 500	1	(Russia) Fedor Vorobyev (Russia) Kirill Shubin	Can-Am Maverick X3	6:26:28
8	(Portugal) Baja de Portalegre 500	2	(Portugal) Gualter Barros (Portugal) Francisco Esperto	Can-Am Maverick X3	6:50:16
8	(Portugal) Baja de Portalegre 500	3	(France) Eric Abel (France) Christian Manez	Polaris RZR 1000	7:07:42

== Championship standings ==
In order to score points in the Cup classifications, competitors must register with the FIA before the entry closing date of the first baja entered.

Points system

- Points for final positions are awarded as per the following table:

Position	1st	2nd	3rd	4th	5th	6th	7th	8th	9th	10th
Overall points	25	18	15	12	10	8	6	4	2	1
T1/T2/T3 Points	5	3	1	0						

=== FIA World Cup for Drivers, Co-Drivers, and Teams ===
==== Drivers' & Co-Drivers' championships ====
Pos	Driver	RUS (Russia)	DUB (United Arab Emirates)	ITA (Italy)	ESP (Spain)	HUN (Hungary)	POL (Poland)	JOR (Jordan)	POR (Portugal)	Points
1	(Argentina) Orlando Terranova			1^{30}	1^{30}	1^{30}		2^{21}	1^{30}	141
2	(Poland) Jakub Przygonski		1^{30}		3^{16}	4^{12}	2^{21}	1^{30}	3^{16}	125
3	(Russia) Vladimir Vasilyev	2^{21}	4^{12}	2^{21}	5^{10}	3^{16}	3^{16}	3^{16}		112
4	(Czech Republic) Martin Prokop		3^{16}	3^{16}	4^{12}	2^{21}				65
5	(Russia) Fedor Vorobyev		14^{3}	4^{17}		7^{11}	7^{11}	5^{15}	12^{5}	62
6	(Spain) Joan “Nani” Roma				2^{21}				2^{21}	42
7	(United Arab Emirates) Khalid Al-Qassimi		2^{21}					4^{12}		33
8	(Poland) Krzysztof Holowczyc						1^{30}			30
9	(Finland) Tapio Lauronen	1^{30}								30
10	(Czech Republic) Miroslav Zapletal		6^{8}			6^{8}	4^{12}			28
11	(Lithuania) Benediktas Vanagas	3^{16}	5^{10}							26
12	(Spain) Santiago Navarro		16^{1}	6^{11}	14^{5}	8^{7}				24
13	(Italy) Michele Cinotto	10^{6}		8^{5}			9^{5}	8^{7}		23
14	(Latvia) Aldis Vilcans	9^{7}	23^{3}			12^{3}	8^{9}			22
15	(Russia) Andrey N	4^{12}	7^{6}							18
16	(Portugal) Helder Oliveira								4^{12}	12
17	(Italy) Lorenzo Codeca’			5^{10}						10
18	(Hungary) Pal Lonyai					5^{10}				10
19	(Poland) Michal Maluzinski						5^{10}			10
20	(Portugal) Ricardo Porém								5^{10}	10
21	(Russia) Andrey Rudskoy	5^{10}								10
22	(Portugal) Joao Ferreira				11^{5}				17^{5}	10
23	(Russia) Wlodzimierz Grajek						6^{8}			8
24	(Russia) Denis Krotov	6^{8}								8
25	(Portugal) Joao Ramos				6^{8}					8
26	(Portugal) Tiago Reis								6^{8}	8
27	(Hungary) Balazs Szalay							6^{8}		8
28	(Hungary) Imre Varga			7^{6}		9^{2}				8
29	(Romania) Claudiu Barbu					11^{5}	12^{3}			8
30	(Saudi Arabia) Moh'd Al-Twijri							7^{6}		6
31	(Portugal) Alexandre Franco								7^{6}	6
32	(Russia) Andrei Halabarodzka	7^{6}								6
33	(Spain) Luis J. Recuenco				7^{6}					6
34	(Argentina) Fernando Alvarez Castellano	8^{4}			9^{2}					6
35	(Russia) Aleksandr Dorosinskiy				10^{1}	15^{3}	10^{2}			6
36	(Qatar) Adel Abdulla		13^{5}							5
37	(Russia) Alexander Baranenko		19^{5}							5
38	(Portugal) Lino Carapeta				8^{4}					4
39	(Portugal) Gregoire De Mevius								8^{4}	4
40	(Poland) Martin Kaczmarski		8^{4}							4
41	(France) Eric Abel						10^{2}		22^{1}	3
42	(Oman) Abdullah Al Zubair	11^{3}								3
43	(Portugal) Nuno Corvo				12^{3}					3
44	(Portugal) Gualter Barros								16^{3}	3
45	(Turkmenistan) Muhammetmyrat Gurbanov	17^{3}								3
46	(Portugal) Georgino Pedroso								18^{3}	3
47	(Poland) Michal Goczal			9^{2}						2
48	(Israel) Guy Haymann							9^{2}		2
49	(Portugal) Nuno Madeira								9^{2}	2
50	(Qatar) Mark Powell		9^{2}							2
51	(Saudi Arabia) Saleh Al-Saif							10^{2}		2
52	(United Arab Emirates) Abdullah Al-Qassimi		10^{1}							1
53	(Portugal) Nuno Matos								10^{1}	1
54	(Portugal) Laurent Poletti				10^{1}					1
55	(Russia) Dmitrii Ponomarenko	12^{1}								1
56	(Portugal) Fernando Barreiros				13^{1}					1
57	(Spain) Gerard Farres				16^{1}					1
58	(Portugal) Eduardo Mota								19^{1}	1
59	(Turkmenistan) Merdan Toylyev	19^{1}								1
Pos	Driver	RUS (Russia)	DUB (United Arab Emirates)	ITA (Italy)	ESP (Spain)	HUN (Hungary)	POL (Poland)	JOR (Jordan)	POR (Portugal)	Points

Pos	Co-Driver	RUS (Russia)	DUB (United Arab Emirates)	ITA (Italy)	ESP (Spain)	HUN (Hungary)	POL (Poland)	JOR (Jordan)	POR (Portugal)	Points
1	(Argentina) Ronnie Graue			1^{30}	1^{30}	1^{30}		2^{21}	1^{30}	141
2	(Germany) Timo Gottschalk		1^{30}		3^{16}	4^{12}	2^{21}	1^{30}	3^{16}	125
3	(Russia) Konstantin Zhiltsov	2^{21}	4^{12}	2^{21}	5^{10}	3^{16}	3^{16}	3^{16}		112
4	(Russia) Kirill Shubin		14^{3}	4^{17}		7^{11}	7^{11}	5^{15}		62
5	(Czech Republic) Jan Tomanek			3^{16}	4^{12}	2^{21}				49
6	(France) Xavier Panseri		2^{21}					4^{12}		33
7	(Spain) Dani Oliveras				14^{5}	8^{7}			2^{21}	33
8	(Poland) Lukasz Kurzeja						1^{30}			30
9	(Finland) Toni Tapio Lauronen	1^{30}								30
10	(Slovakia) Marek Sykora		6^{8}			6^{8}	4^{12}			28
11	(Poland) Bartolomiej Boba	3^{16}	5^{10}							26
12	(Latvia) Daira Vilcane	9^{7}	23^{3}			12^{3}	8^{9}			22
13	(Spain) Alex Haro				2^{21}					21
14	(Russia) Andrey N	4^{12}	7^{6}							18
15	(Czech Republic) David Kripal		3^{16}							16
16	(Italy) Maurizio Dominella	10^{6}		8^{5}			9^{5}			16
17	(Portugal) Paulo Piuza								4^{12}	12
18	(Spain) Marc Sola			6^{11}						11
19	(Hungary) Albert Horn					5^{10}				10
20	(Portugal) Julita Maluzinska						5^{10}			10
21	(Portugal) Manuel Porém								5^{10}	10
22	(Portugal) Mauro Toffoli			10^{5}						10
23	(Russia) Evgenii Zagorodniuk	5^{10}								10
24	(Portugal) David Monteiro				11^{5}				17^{5}	8
25	(Poland) Piotr Brakowiecki						6^{8}			8
26	(Hungary) Laszlo Bunkoczi							6^{8}		8
27	(Portugal) Valter Cardoso								6^{8}	8
28	(Portugal) Victor Jesus				6^{8}					8
29	(Kazakhstan) Dmytro Tsyro	6^{8}								8
30	(Hungary) Jozsef Toma			7^{6}		9^{2}				8
31	(Romania) Paul Spiridon					11^{5}	12^{3}			8
32	(Spain) Rafael Tornabel	8^{7}								7
33	(Spain) Victor M. Alijas				7^{6}					6
34	(Portugal) Rui Franco								7^{6}	6
35	(United Arab Emirates) Ali Obaid							7^{6}		6
36	(Russia) Andrei Rudnitski	7^{6}								6
37	(Russia) Juan Pablo Monasterolo	8^{4}			9^{2}					6
38	(France) Jean-Michel Polato		13^{5}							5
39	(Russia) Alexander Gorkov		19^{5}							5
40	(Belgium) Andre Leyh								8^{4}	4
41	(Portugal) Rui M. Pereira				8^{4}					4
42	(Finland) Tapio Suominen		8^{4}							3
43	(Latvia) Oleg Uperenko			10^{1}		10^{2}				3
44	(France) Christian Manez						10^{2}		22^{1}	3
45	(Oman) Faisal Al Raisi	11^{3}								3
47	(Portugal) José Martins				12^{3}					3
47	(Russia) Dmitry Pavloc				15^{3}					3
48	(Portugal) Francisco Esperto								16^{3}	3
49	(Turkmenistan) Muhammetmyrat Gurbanov	17^{3}								3
50	(Portugal) Carlos Silva								18^{3}	3
51	(Poland) Szymon Gospodarczyk			9^{2}						2
52	(Israel) Raz Heymann							9^{2}		2
53	(United Kingdom) Chloe Jones		9^{2}							2
54	(Portugal) Felipe Serra								9^{2}	2
55	(Jordan) Moath Al-Arja							10^{2}		2
56	(France) Cyril Debet			10^{1}						1
57	(United Kingdom) Steve Lancaster		10^{1}							1
58	(Portugal) Joel Lutas								10^{1}	1
59	(Russia) Dmitrii Karpov	12^{1}								1
60	(Portugal) Nuno Barreiros				13^{1}					1
61	(Spain) Pedro Gabriel Lopez		16^{1}							1
62	(Spain) Armand Monleon				16^{1}					1
63	(Portugal) Nuno Sousa								19^{1}	1
64	(Turkmenistan) Shohrat Toylyev	19^{1}								1
Pos	Co-Driver	RUS (Russia)	DUB (United Arab Emirates)	ITA (Italy)	ESP (Spain)	HUN (Hungary)	POL (Poland)	JOR (Jordan)	POR (Portugal)	Points

==== Teams' championship ====
Pos	Team	RUS (Russia)	DUB (United Arab Emirates)	ITA (Italy)	ESP (Spain)	HUN (Hungary)	POL (Poland)	JOR (Jordan)	POR (Portugal)	Points
1	(Germany) X-Raid Mini JCW Team			30	30	30	30	21	30	171
2	(Poland) Orlen Team/X-Raid		30		16	12	21	130	16	125
3	(Russia) VRT	21	12	21	10	16	16	16		112
4	(Czech Republic) MP-Sports		16	16	12	21				65
5	(Russia) Fedor Vorobyev		3	17		11	11	15	5	62
6	(United Arab Emirates) Abu Dhabi Racing		21					12		33
7	(Finland) RE Autoklubs	30								30
8	(Spain) FN Speed Team		5	11	5	7				28
9	(Lithuania) General Financing Team Pitlane	16	10							26
10	(Latvia) VA Motorsports	7	5			3	9			24
11	(Italy) CR Racing	6		5			5	7		23
12	(Germany) Borgward Rally Team								21	21
13	(Russia) G-Force Motorsport	12	6							18
14	(Portugal) Helder Oliveira								12	12
15	(Poland) M-For Sport Rally						12			12
16	(Italy) Lorenzo Codeca’			10						10
17	(Hungary) LP Racing KFT					10				10
18	(Poland) Michal Maluzinski						10			10
19	(Portugal) Joao Ferreira				5				5	10
20	(Germany) South Racing	4			2				3	9
21	(Hungary) Balazs Szalay							8		8
22	(Portugal) Joao Ramos				8					8
23	(Czech Republic) Miroslav Zapletal					8				8
24	(Russia) MSK Rally Team	8								8
25	(Czech Republic) OFFROADSPORT		8							8
26	(Portugal) Tiago Reis								8	8
27	(Russia) Wlodzimierz Grajek						8			8
28	(Hungary) Varga Racing Team ASE			6		2				8
29	(Belgium) Overdrive Racing		4						4	8
30	(Romania) Transcarpatic Rally Team					5	3			8
31	(Saudi Arabia) Al-Twijri Racing							6		6
32	(Portugal) Alexandre Franco								6	6
33	(Russia) Andrei Halabarodzka	6								6
34	(Spain) Cuenca Motor 4X4				6					6
35	(Latvia) Sports Racing Technologies			1	3	2				6
36	(Portugal) Lino Carapeta				4					4
37	(France) Eric Abel						2		1	3
38	(Oman) AZ Racing Team	3								3
39	(Portugal) Nuno Corvo				3					3
40	Federation Automobile Sport of Turkmenistan	3								3
41	(Portugal) Prolama								3	3
42	(Poland) Energylandia Rally Team			2						2
43	(Israel) Guy Bitton							2		2
44	(United Arab Emirates) Saluki Racing		2							2
45	(Portugal) SGS Car								2	2
46	(Saudi Arabia) Saleh Al-Saif							2		2
47	(Portugal) Laurent Poletti				1					1
48	(Portugal) Nuno Matos								1	1
49	(United Arab Emirates) Sabertooth Motoring Adventure		1							1
50	(Russia) Team Maria Oparina	1								1
51	(Portugal) Fernando Barreiros				1					1
52	(Germany) Monster Energy Can-Am				1					1
53	(Portugal) Eduardo Mota								1	1
Pos	Team	RUS (Russia)	DUB (United Arab Emirates)	ITA (Italy)	ESP (Spain)	HUN (Hungary)	POL (Poland)	JOR (Jordan)	POR (Portugal)	Points

=== FIA T2 Cup for Drivers and Teams ===
Pos	Driver	RUS (Russia)	DUB (United Arab Emirates)	ITA (Italy)	ESP (Spain)	HUN (Hungary)	POL (Poland)	JOR (Jordan)	POR (Portugal)	Points
1	(Latvia) Aldis Vilcans	1^{25}	2^{18}			2^{18}	1^{25}			86
2	(Portugal) Joao Ferreira				1^{25}				1^{25}	50
3	(Romania) Claudiu Barbu					1^{25}	2^{18}		7^{6}	49
4	(Portugal) Nuno Corvo				2^{18}				4^{12}	30
5	(Russia) Alexander Baranenko		1^{25}							25
6	(Portugal) Fernando Barreiros				3^{15}				6^{8}	23
7	(Turkmenistan) Muhammetmyrat Gurbanov	2^{18}								18
8	(Portugal) Georgino Pedroso								2^{18}	18
9	(Portugal) Eduardo Mota								3^{15}	15
10	(Turkmenistan) Merdan Toylyev	3^{15}								15
11	(Spain) Domingo Roman				4^{12}					12
12	(Portugal) Jose Gonzaléz								5^{10}	10
Pos	Driver	RUS (Russia)	DUB (United Arab Emirates)	ITA (Italy)	ESP (Spain)	HUN (Hungary)	POL (Poland)	JOR (Jordan)	POR (Portugal)	Points

Pos	Team	RUS (Russia)	DUB (United Arab Emirates)	ITA (Italy)	ESP (Spain)	HUN (Hungary)	POL (Poland)	JOR (Jordan)	POR (Portugal)	Points
1	(Latvia) VA Motorsports	25	25			18	25			93
2	(Portugal) Joao Ferreira				25				25	50
3	(Romania) Transcarpatic Rally Team					25	18		6	49
4	(Portugal) Nuno Corvo				18				12	30
5	(Portugal) Metal Lube Rally Raid Team				12				10	22
6	Federation Automobile Sport of Turkmenistan	18								18
7	(Portugal) Prolama								18	18
8	(Portugal) Eduardo Mota								15	15
9	(Portugal) Fernando Barreiros				3^{15}					15
Pos	Team	RUS (Russia)	DUB (United Arab Emirates)	ITA (Italy)	ESP (Spain)	HUN (Hungary)	POL (Poland)	JOR (Jordan)	POR (Portugal)	Points

=== FIA T3 Cup for Drivers and Teams ===
Pos	Driver	RUS (Russia)	DUB (United Arab Emirates)	ITA (Italy)	ESP (Spain)	HUN (Hungary)	POL (Poland)	JOR (Jordan)	POR (Portugal)	Points
1	(Russia) Fedor Vorobyev	6^{8}	2^{18}	1^{25}	7^{6}	1^{25}	1^{25}	1^{25}	1^{25}	157
2	(Italy) Michele Cinotto	1^{25}	4^{12}	3^{15}	5^{10}	4^{12}	2^{18}	2^{18}		110
3	(Spain) Santiago Navarro		3^{15}	2^{18}	1^{25}	2^{18}				76
4	(Qatar) Adel Abdulla		1^{25}	6^{8}	4^{12}					45
5	(Russia) Aleksandr Dorosinskiy			5^{10}	2^{18}	3^{15}				15
6	(Oman) Abdullah Al Zubair	2^{18}	6^{8}		6^{8}					34
7	(France) Eric Abel						3^{15}		3^{15}	30
8	(Portugal) Gualter Barros								2^{18}	18
9	(Saudi Arabia) Saleh Al-Saif							3^{15}		15
10	(Spain) Gerard Farres				3^{15}					15
11	(Russia) Dmitrii Ponomarenko	3^{15}								15
12	(Poland) Michal Goczal			4^{12}						12
13	(France) Graham Knight								4^{12}	12
14	(Russia) Aleksei Shmotev	4^{12}								12
15	(France) Frederic Chavigny	5^{10}								10
16	(Lebanon) Michel Fadel		5^{10}							10
17	(Russia) Maria Oparina	7^{6}								6
18	(Andorra) Ilya Rouss				8^{4}					4
19	(Russia) Tatjana Sycheva	8^{4}								4
20	(Argentina) Adrian Yacopini				9^{2}					2
Pos	Driver	RUS (Russia)	DUB (United Arab Emirates)	ITA (Italy)	ESP (Spain)	HUN (Hungary)	POL (Poland)	JOR (Jordan)	POR (Portugal)	Points

Pos	Team	RUS (Russia)	DUB (United Arab Emirates)	ITA (Italy)	ESP (Spain)	HUN (Hungary)	POL (Poland)	JOR (Jordan)	POR (Portugal)	Points
1	(Russia) Zavidovo Racing Team	8	18	25	6	25	25	25	25	157
2	(Italy) CR Racing	25	12	15	10	12	18	18		110
3	(Spain) FN Speed Team		25	18	25	18				86
4	(Latvia) Sports Racing Technologies		10	18	15					43
5	(Oman) AZ Racing Team	18	10		8					36
6	(France) Eric Abel						15		15	30
7	(Germany) South Racing								18	18
8	(Germany) Monster Energy Can-Am				15					15
9	(Saudi Arabia) Saleh Al-Saif							15		15
10	(Russia) Team Maria Oparina	15								15
11	(Poland) Energylandia Rally Team						12			15
12	(France) Graham Knight								12	12
13	(Russia) Snag Racing Team	12								12
14	(France) Frederic Chavigny	10								10
15	(Germany) South Racing Can-Am				4					4
Pos	Team	RUS (Russia)	DUB (United Arab Emirates)	ITA (Italy)	ESP (Spain)	HUN (Hungary)	POL (Poland)	JOR (Jordan)	POR (Portugal)	Points
