= 2020 FIA World Cup for Cross-Country Bajas =

2020 FIA World Cup for Cross-Country Bajas
Previous:	2019	Next:	2021

The 2020 FIA World Cup for Cross-Country Bajas is the second season of the reformed FIA World Cup for Cross-Country Bajas; an annual competition for baja-style rally raid events for cars, buggies, and side-by-sides held in multiple countries.

== Calendar ==
The initial calendar for the 2020 world cup featured eight cross-country baja events. Some events on the schedule are shared with the 2020 FIM Bajas World Cup. Due to COVID-19 pandemic, the calendar suffered several changes.

Round	Dates	Rally name	Ref.
1	6–9 February	Baja Russia - Northern Forest	
2	3–6 September	Baja Poland	
3	5–7 November	(Portugal) Baja Portalegre 500	
4	10–12 December	(Saudi Arabia) Hail Baja 1	
5	14–15 December	(Saudi Arabia) Hail Baja 2	
Cancelled due to the 2019-20 coronavirus pandemic
Original Date		Rally name	
16–18 April		Jordan Baja	
18–21 June		(Italy) Italian Baja	
23–25 July		(Spain) Baja España Aragón	
13–16 August		(Hungary) Hungarian Baja	
26–28 November		(United Arab Emirates) Dubai International Baja	

== Regulation Changes ==
Starting with the 2020 season the vehicle classes have been reorganized into the following classifications:

- T1.1 - 4x4 Prototype Cross-Country Vehicles - Petrol and Diesel
- T1.2 - 4x2 Prototype Cross-Country Vehicles - Petrol and Diesel
- T2 - Series Production Cross Country Vehicles
- T3 - Improved Lightweight Prototypes Cross Country Vehicles
- T4 - Improved Lightweight Series Side by Side Cross Country Vehicles

The FIA awards the world cup to drivers, co-drivers, and teams competing in the T1 category; whilst drivers and teams in the T3 and T4 categories are awarded FIA cups. The T2 production class will no longer be awarded an end of season trophy.

== Notable teams and drivers ==
Constructor	Car	Team	Driver	Co-driver	Category	Rounds
BMW	BMW X3	(Russia) G-Energy Team	(Russia) Vladimir Vasilyev	(Russia) Vitaliy Yevtyekhov	T1	1
BMW	BMW X3	(Russia) MSK Rally Team	(Russia) Denis Krotov	(Russia) Dmytrio Tsyro	T1	1
Can-Am	Can-Am Maverick X3	(Russia) Zavidovo Racing Team	(Russia) Fedor Vorobyev	(Russia) Kirill Shubin	T3	1
Can-Am	Can-Am Maverick X3	(Russia) G-Force Motorsport	(Brazil) Reinaldo Varela	(Brazil) Youssef Haddad	T3	1
Can-Am	Can-Am Maverick X3	(Russia) Snag Racing Team	(Russia) Alexei Shmotev	(Belarus) Andrei Rudnitski	T3	1
Can-Am	Can-Am Maverick X3	(Spain) Bernd Hans Hoffman	(Spain) Bernd Hans Hoffman	(Spain) Juan Carlos Carignani	T3	1-3
Can-Am	Can-Am Maverick X3	(Spain) Automovil Club Alcalans	(Spain) Enrique Reyes Medina	(Spain) Daniel Conde Donaire	T3	1
Can-Am	Can-Am Maverick X3	(Spain) Automovil Club Alcalans	(Spain) Miguel Angel Valero Chulia	(Spain) Jacqueline Ricci Ferris	T3	1
Can-Am	Can-Am Maverick X3	(Russia) Biedrība Sports Racing Technologies (Latvia) Sports Racing Technologies	(Russia) Vasily Gryazin	(Latvia) Oleg Uperenko	T3	All
Can-Am	Can-Am Maverick X3	(Russia) Aleksandr Alekseev	(Russia) Tatiana Sycheva	(Russia) Aleksandr Alekseev	T3	1
Can-Am	Can-Am Maverick X3	(Germany) South Racing	(Belgium) Guillaume De Mévius	(Belgium) Martijn Wydaeghe	T3	3-5
Can-Am	Can-Am Maverick	(Germany) South Racing	(Qatar) Khalifa Al-Attiyah	(Italy) Paolo Ceci	T4	4-5
Can-Am	Can-Am Maverick	(Germany) South Racing	(Netherlands) Kees Koolen	(Netherlands) Miriam Pol	T4	3
Can-Am	Can-Am Maverick	(Germany) South Racing	(Netherlands) Kees Koolen	(Netherlands) Jurgen van den Goorbergh	T4	4-5
Can-Am	Can-Am Maverick	(Germany) South Racing	(Portugal) Lorenço Rosa	(Portugal) Joaquim Dias	T4	4-5
Can-Am	Can-Am Maverick	(Germany) Monster Energy Can-Am	(Poland) Aron Damzala	(Poland) Szymon Gospodarczyk	T4	2
Can-Am	Can-Am Maverick	(Germany) Monster Energy Can-Am	(Poland) Aron Damzala	(Poland) Maciej Marton	T4	3-5
Can-Am	Can-Am Maverick	(Germany) Monster Energy Can-Am	(Spain) Gerard Farrés Guell	(Spain) Armand Monleón Hernández	T4	2
Can-Am	Can-Am Maverick	(Netherlands) Kees Koolen	(Netherlands) Kees Koolen	(Belgium) Serge Bruynkens	T4	2
GAZ	GAZelle NEXT	(Russia) Gaz Raid Sport	(Russia) Evgenii Sukhovenko	(Russia) Kirill Chapaev	T1	1
GAZ	GAZelle NEXT	(Russia) Gaz Raid Sport	(Russia) Alexey Ignatov	(Russia) Evgeny Pavlov	T1	1
G-Force	G-Force BARS	(Russia) G-Force Motorsport	(Russia) Andrey Novikov	(Russia) Vladimir Novikov	T1	1
G-Force	G-Force BARS	(Russia) NG-Energo	(Russia) Andrey Rudskoy	(Russia) Evgenii Zagorodniuk	T1	1
Mini	Mini John Cooper Works Rally	(Russia) VRT	(Russia) Vladimir Vasilyev	(Russia) Dmitro Tsyro	T1	3-5
Mini	Mini John Cooper Works Rally	(Poland) Michal Maluszynski	(Poland) Michal Maluszynski	(Poland) Julita Maluszynski	T1	2
Mini	Mini John Cooper Works Rally	(Germany) X-raid Mini JCW Team	(Russia) Denis Krotov	(Russia) Konstantin Zhiltsov	T1	4-5
Mini	Mini John Cooper Works Rally	(Germany) X-raid Mini JCW Team	(Russia) Viktor Khoroshavtsev	(Russia) Anton Nikolaev	T1	4-5
Mini	Mini All4 Racing	(Germany) X-raid Mini JCW Team	(France) Stéphane Peterhansel	(France) Edouard Boulanger	T1	2
Mini	Mini John Cooper Works Buggy	(Germany) X-raid Mini JCW Team	(France) Stéphane Peterhansel	(France) Edouard Boulanger	T1	4-5
Mini	Mini John Cooper Works Buggy	(Germany) X-raid Mini JCW Team	(Spain) Carlos Sainz	(Spain) Lucas Cruz	T1	4-5
Mitsubishi	Mitsubishi Pajero	(Finland) Biedrība RE AUTOKLUBS	(Finland) Tapio Lauronen	(Finland) Lassi Turunen	T1	1
Mitsubishi	Mitsubishi Pajero	(Finland) Biedrība RE AUTOKLUBS	(Finland) Toni Tapio Lauronen	(Finland) Tapio Suominen	T1	1
Mitsubishi	Mitsubishi Lancer	(Portugal) Ricardo Leal Dos Santos	(Portugal) Ricardo Leal Dos Santos	(Portugal) Joāo Serodio Fernandes	T1	1
Nissan	Nissan NP300 Pickup	(Russia) Uspenskiy Rally Tecnica	(Russia) Sergey Uspenskiy	(Russia) Marina Danilova	T1	1
Nissan	Nissan Patrol	Federation Automobile Sport of Turkmenistan	(Turkmenistan) Merdan Toylyyev	(Turkmenistan) Shohrat Toylyyev	T2	1
Nissan	Nissan Patrol	Federation Automobile Sport of Turkmenistan	(Turkmenistan) Shamyrat Gurbanow	(Turkmenistan) Muhammetmyrat Gurbanow	T2	1
Nissan	Nissan Patrol	Federation Automobile Sport of Turkmenistan	(Turkmenistan) Maksatmyrat Danatarow	(Turkmenistan) Gurbanberdi Danatarow	T2	1
Polaris	Polaris Ranger RZR XP	(Russia) Team Maria Oparina	(Russia) Dmitry Ponomarenko	(Russia) Dmitry Kozhukhov	T3	1
Toyota	Toyota Hilux	(Japan) Toyota Gazoo Racing	(Qatar) Nasser Al-Attiyah	(France) Mathieu Baumel	T1	4-5
Toyota	Toyota Hilux	(Russia) Andrei Halabarodzka	(Russia) Andrei Halabarodzka	(Russia) Aliaksei Kraktun	T1	1
Toyota	Toyota Hilux Overdrive	(Belgium) Overdrive SA	(Netherlands) Bernhard Ten Brinke	(Belgium) Tom Colsoul	T1	2-5
Toyota	Toyota Hilux Overdrive	(Belgium) Overdrive SA	(Saudi Arabia) Yazeed Al-Rajhi	(Germany) Dirk Von Zitzewitz	T1	4-5
Toyota	Toyota Hilux Overdrive	(Belgium) Overdrive SA	(France) Ronan Chabot	(France) Gilles Pillot	T1	5
Toyota	Toyota Hilux Overdrive	(Poland) Orlen Team/Overdrive	(Poland) Jakub Przygonski	(Germany) Timo Gottschalk	T1	2,4-5
Toyota	Toyota LC 200	(Russia) NOVGORODAUTOSPORT	(Latvia) Aldis Vilcans	(Russia) Aleksandr Gorkov	T2	1
Toyota	Toyota LC 200	(Russia) NOVGORODAUTOSPORT	(Russia) Anton Melnikov	(Russia) Anton Nikolaev	T2	1

== Results ==
=== Overall ===
Round	Rally name	Podium finishers			
Round	Rally name	Rank	Driver	Car	Time
1	Baja Russia - Northern Forest	1	(Russia) Vladimir Vasilyev (Russia) Vitaliy Yevtyekhov	BMW X3	4:27:44
1	Baja Russia - Northern Forest	2	(Russia) Andrey Novikov (Russia) Vladimir Novikov	G-Force BARS	4:45:34
1	Baja Russia - Northern Forest	3	(Russia) Denis Krotov (Russia) Dmytro Tsyro	BMW X3	4:56:13
2	Baja Poland	1	(France) Stéphane Peterhansel (France) Edouard Boulanger	Mini All4 Racing	5:52:20
2	Baja Poland	2	(Netherlands) Bernhard Ten Brinke (Belgium) Tom Colsoul	Toyota Hilux Overdrive	6:05:08
2	Baja Poland	3	(Poland) Michal Małuszyński (Poland) Julita Michal Małuszyńska	MINI John Cooper Works Rally	6:15:23
3	(Portugal) Baja Portalegre 500	1	(Netherlands) Bernhard Ten Brinke (Belgium) Tom Colsoul	Toyota Hilux Overdrive	2:18:11
3	(Portugal) Baja Portalegre 500	2	(Belgium) Guillaume de Mévius (Belgium) Martijn Wydaeghe	Can-Am Maverick X3 (T3)	2:19:28
3	(Portugal) Baja Portalegre 500	3	(Russia) Vladimir Vasilyev (Russia) Dmitro Tsyro	Mini Cooper Countryman	2:19:31
4	(Saudi Arabia) Baja Hail 1	1	(Qatar) Nasser Al-Attiyah (France) Mathieu Baumel	Toyota Hilux	6:14:27
4	(Saudi Arabia) Baja Hail 1	2	(Spain) Carlos Sainz (Spain) Lucas Cruz	Mini John Cooper Works Buggy	6:20:37
4	(Saudi Arabia) Baja Hail 1	3	(France) Stephane Peterhansel (France) Edouard Boulanger	Mini John Cooper Works Buggy	6:23:26
5	(Saudi Arabia) Baja Hail 2	1	(Spain) Carlos Sainz (Spain) Lucas Cruz	Mini John Cooper Works Buggy	4:51:24
5	(Saudi Arabia) Baja Hail 2	2	(Qatar) Nasser Al-Attiyah (France) Mathieu Baumel	Toyota Hilux	4:51:30
5	(Saudi Arabia) Baja Hail 2	3	(France) Stephane Peterhansel (France) Edouard Boulanger	Mini John Cooper Works Buggy	4:52:40

=== T2 category ===
Round	Rally name	Podium finishers			
Round	Rally name	Rank	Driver	Car	Time
1	Baja Russia - Northern Forest	1	(Latvia) Aldis Vilcans (Russia) Alexandr Gorkov	Toyota LC 200	5:44:48
1	Baja Russia - Northern Forest	2	(Russia) Anton Melnikov (Russia) Anton Nikolaev	Toyota LC 200	6:00:24
1	Baja Russia - Northern Forest	3	(Russia) Andrey Sushentsov (Russia) Igor Petenko	Toyota LC 200	6:24:39
2	Baja Poland	1	(Poland) Patrycja Brochocka (Poland) Rafal Marton	Toyota Land Cruiser	12:48:00
3	(Portugal) Baja Portalegre 500	1	(Portugal) João Ferreira (Portugal) David Monteiro	Nissan Pathfinder	2:55:13
3	(Portugal) Baja Portalegre 500	2	(Portugal) Georgino Pedroso (Portugal) Carlos Silva	Isuzu D-Max	3:06:28
3	(Portugal) Baja Portalegre 500	3	(Portugal) Nuno Corvo (Portugal) José Camilo Martins	Nissan Pathfinder	3:47:29
4	(Saudi Arabia) Baja Hail 1	1	(Saudi Arabia) Youssef Oudah A Alshammari (Saudi Arabia) Abdallah Alsuqairi	Nissan Patrol	9:42:18
4	(Saudi Arabia) Baja Hail 1	2	(Saudi Arabia) Abdulaziz Alyaeesh (Saudi Arabia) Faisal Mohammed Ftyh	Isuzu D-Max	41:00:00
5	(Saudi Arabia) Baja Hail 1	1	(Saudi Arabia) Youssef Oudah A Alshammari (Saudi Arabia) Abdallah Alsuqairi	Nissan Patrol	6:37:31
5	(Saudi Arabia) Baja Hail 1	2	(Saudi Arabia) Yaqoub Hejji Alshammari (Saudi Arabia) Nader Alshammari	Isuzu D-Max	7:57:25
5	(Saudi Arabia) Baja Hail 1	3	(Saudi Arabia) Ibrahim Abdulrahman Bensahman (Jordan) Moad Al-Arja	Isuzu D-Max	16:50:11

=== T3 category ===
Round	Rally name	Podium finishers			
Round	Rally name	Rank	Driver	Car	Time
1	Baja Russia - Northern Forest	1	(Russia) Fedor Vorobyev (Russia) Kirill Shubin	Can-Am Maverick X3	4:58:10
1	Baja Russia - Northern Forest	2	(Russia) Aleksei Shmotev (Russia) Andrei Rudnitski	Can-Am Maverick X3	5:15:23
1	Baja Russia - Northern Forest	3	(Russia) Tatiana Sycheva (Russia) Aleksandr Alekseev	Can-Am Maverick X3	5:30:44
2	Baja Poland	1	(Russia) Vasily Gryazin (Latvia) Oleg Uperenko	Can-Am Maverick X3	6:28:43
2	Baja Poland	2	(Spain) Bernd Hans Hoffmann (Spain) Juan Carlos Carignani	Can-Am X3 Herrator	13:33:46
2	(Portugal) Baja Portalegre 500	1	(Belgium) Guillaume de Mévius (Belgium) Martijn Wydaeghe	Can-Am Maverick X3	2:19:28
2	(Portugal) Baja Portalegre 500	2	(Russia) Vasily Gryazin (Latvia) Oleg Uperenko	Can-Am Maverick X3	2:22:05
2	(Portugal) Baja Portalegre 500	3	(France) Laurent Poletti (France) Cyril Debet	Can-Am Maverick X3	2:32:00
4	(Saudi Arabia) Baja Hail 1	1	(Saudi Arabia) Saleh Abdullah Alsaif (France) Laurent Lichtleuchter	Can-Am X3 RR	7:10:19
4	(Saudi Arabia) Baja Hail 1	2	(Belgium) Guillaume De Mévius (Belgium) Martijn Wydaeghe	Can-Am Maverick	7:19:08
4	(Saudi Arabia) Baja Hail 1	3	(Russia) Vasily Gryazin (Latvia) Oleg Uperenko	Can-Am Maverick	16:52:42
5	(Saudi Arabia) Baja Hail 2	1	(Saudi Arabia) Saleh Abdullah Alsaif (France) Laurent Lichtleuchter	Can-Am X3 RR	5:55:45
5	(Saudi Arabia) Baja Hail 2	2	(Russia) Vasily Gryazin (Latvia) Oleg Uperenko	Can-Am Maverick	6:01:44
5	(Saudi Arabia) Baja Hail 2	3	(Belgium) Guillaume De Mévius (Belgium) Martijn Wydaeghe	Can-Am Maverick	6:38:55

=== T4 category ===
Round	Rally name	Podium finishers			
Round	Rally name	Rank	Driver	Car	Time
1	Baja Russia - Northern Forest	No competitors at start			
2	Baja Poland	1	(Poland) Aron Domżała (Poland) Szymon Gospodarczyk	Can-Am X3	6:17:01
2	Baja Poland	2	(Spain) Gerard Farrés Guell (Spain) Armand Monleón Hernández	Can-Am X3	9:28:14
2	Baja Poland	3	(Netherlands) Kees Koolen (Belgium) Serge Bruynkens	Can-Am X3	13:25:55
3	(Portugal) Baja Portalegre 500	1	(Poland) Aron Domzala (Poland) Marciel Marton	Can-Am Maverick	2:21:01
3	(Portugal) Baja Portalegre 500	2	(Portugal) Alexandre Ré; Pedro Ré	Can-Am Maverick	2:35:01
3	(Portugal) Baja Portalegre 500	3	(Netherlands) Kees Koolen (Netherlands) Miriam Pol	Can-Am Maverick	2:40:08
4	(Saudi Arabia) Baja Hail 1	1	(Netherlands) Kees Koolen (Netherlands) Jurgen van den Goorbergh	Can-Am Maverick	7:41:43
4	(Saudi Arabia) Baja Hail 1	2	(Qatar) Khalifa Al-Attiyah (Italy) Paolo Ceci	Can-Am Maverick	7:49:05
4	(Saudi Arabia) Baja Hail 1	3	(Poland) Aron Domzala (Poland) Maciej Marton	Can-Am Maverick	19:43:08
5	(Saudi Arabia) Baja Hail 2	1	(Qatar) Khalifa Al-Attiyah (Italy) Paolo Ceci	Can-Am Maverick	6:00:19
5	(Saudi Arabia) Baja Hail 2	2	(Netherlands) Kees Koolen (Netherlands) Jurgen van den Goorbergh	Can-Am Maverick	6:07:43
5	(Saudi Arabia) Baja Hail 2	3	(Portugal) Lorenço Rosa (Portugal) Joaquim Dias	Can-Am Maverick	6:19:00

== Championship standings ==
In order to score points in the Cup classifications, competitors must register with the FIA before the entry closing date of the first rally entered.

Points system

- Points for final positions are awarded as per the following table:

Position	1st	2nd	3rd	4th	5th	6th	7th	8th	9th	10th
Overall points	25	18	15	12	10	8	6	4	2	1
Leg Points	1.5	1	.5	0						

For the 2020 season points will be awarded to the top three finishing positions of each leg on each event. These points will only be awarded if the driver finishes in the overall classification of each event. If they do not then no leg points are awarded, but the following vehicles will not move up a position for leg points.

Competitors were awarded with reduced points at the Baja Portalegre 500, which was shortened.

=== FIA World Cup for Drivers, Co-Drivers, and Teams ===
==== Drivers' championship ====
Pos	Driver	RUS (Russia)	POL (Poland)	POR (Portugal)	SAU1 (Saudi Arabia)	SAU2 (Saudi Arabia)	Points
1	(Russia) Vladimir Vasilyev	1^{28}		3^{5}	5^{10}	6^{8}	51
2	(Netherlands) Bernhard Ten Brinke		1^{26.5}	1^{8}	6^{8}	7^{6}	48.5
3	(Qatar) Nasser Al-Attiyah				1^{28}	2^{20.5}	48.5
4	(Spain) Carlos Sainz				2^{19.5}	1^{26.5}	46
5	(France) Stephane Peterhansel		NP		3^{16.5}	3^{16.5}	33
6	(Saudi Arabia) Yazeed Al Rahji				4^{12}	4^{12.5}	24.5
7	(Russia) Denis Krotov	3^{15}			7^{6}	10^{1}	22
8	(Poland) Jakub Przygonski		4^{12}			5^{10}	22
9	(Russia) Andrey Novikov	2^{19.5}					19.5
10	(Poland) Aron Domzala		3^{15.5}	4^{4}			19
11	(Poland) Michal Maluszynski		2^{19}				19
12	(Russia) Vasily Gryazin		5^{10}	5^{3}			13
13	(Russia) Sergey Uspenskiy	4^{12.5}					12.5
14	(Russia) Fedor Vorobyev	5^{10}					10
16	(Russia) Alexei Shmotev	6^{8}					8
17	(Belgium) Guillaume De Mévius			2^{6}			6
Pos	Driver	RUS (Russia)	POL (Poland)	POR (Portugal)	SAU1 (Saudi Arabia)	SAU2 (Saudi Arabia)	Points

- A total of 33 drivers scored points.

==== Co-Drivers' championship ====
Pos	Driver	RUS (Russia)	POL (Poland)	POR (Portugal)	SAU1 (Saudi Arabia)	SAU2 (Saudi Arabia)	Points
1	(Belgium) Tom Colsoul		1^{26.5}	1^{8}	6^{8}	7^{6}	48.5
2	(Qatar) Mathieu Baumel				1^{28}	2^{20.5}	48.5
3	(Spain) Lucas Cruz				2^{19.5}	1^{26.5}	46
4	(Russia) Dmytro Tsyro	3^{15}		3^{5}	5^{10}	6^{8}	38
5	(France) Edouard Boulanger				3^{16.5}	3^{16.5}	33
6	(Russia) Vitaliy Yevtyekhov	1^{28}					28
7	(Germany) Dirk Von Zitzewitz				4^{12}	4^{12.5}	24.5
8	(Germany) Timo Gottschalk		4^{12}			5^{10}	22
9	(Russia) Vladimir Novikov	2^{19.5}					19.5
10	(Poland) Julita Maluszynska		2^{19}				19
Pos	Driver	RUS (Russia)	POL (Poland)	POR (Portugal)	SAU1 (Saudi Arabia)	SAU2 (Saudi Arabia)	Points

- A total of 35 co-drivers scored points.

==== Teams' championship ====
Pos	Driver	RUS (Russia)	POL (Poland)	POR (Portugal)	SAU1 (Saudi Arabia)	SAU2 (Saudi Arabia)	Points
1	(Germany) X-raid Mini JCW Team		8		33	40	81
2	(Belgium) Overdrive SA		25	8	20	18	71
3	(Japan) Toyota Gazoo Racing				25	18	43
4	(Russia) G-Energy Team	25					25
5	(Germany) Monster Energy Can-Am		19	4			23
6	(Russia) VRT			5	10	8	23
7	(Poland) Orlen Team/Overdrive		12			10	22
8	(Russia) G-Force Motorsport	18					18
9	(Poland) Maluszynski Michal		18				18
10	(Russia) MSK Rally Team	15					15
Pos	Driver	RUS (Russia)	POL (Poland)	POR (Portugal)	SAU1 (Saudi Arabia)	SAU2 (Saudi Arabia)	Points

- A total of 29 teams scored points.

=== FIA T3 Cup for Drivers ===
Pos	Driver	RUS (Russia)	POL (Poland)	POR (Portugal)	SAU1 (Saudi Arabia)	SAU2 (Saudi Arabia)	Points
1	(Russia) Vasily Gryazin	7^{7.5}	1^{26.5}	2^{0}	3^{16}	2^{20}	70
2	(Saudi Arabia) Saleh Abdullah Alsaif			5^{3}	1^{28}	1^{27}	58
3	(Belgium) Guillaume De Mévius			1^{8}	2^{20}	3^{17}	45
4	(Spain) Bernd Hans Hoffmann	5^{10}	2^{19}	7^{2}			31
5	(Russia) Fedor Vorobyev	1^{27.5}					27.5
6	(Russia) Alexei Shmotev	2^{19.5}					19.5
7	(Russia) Tatiana Sycheva	3^{15.5}					15.5
8	(Spain) Enrique Reyes Medina	4^{12}					12
9	(Brazil) Reinaldo Varela	6^{8}					8
10	(France) Laurent Poletti			3^{5}			5
Pos	Driver	RUS (Russia)	POL (Poland)	POR (Portugal)	SAU1 (Saudi Arabia)	SAU2 (Saudi Arabia)	Points

- A total of 13 drivers scored points.

=== FIA T4 Cup for Drivers and Teams ===
==== Drivers' championship ====
Pos	Driver	RUS (Russia)	POL (Poland)	POR (Portugal)	SAU1 (Saudi Arabia)	SAU2 (Saudi Arabia)	Points
1	(Netherlands) Kees Koolen		3^{15.5}	3^{5}	1^{27.5}	2^{19}	67
2	(Poland) Aron Domzala		1^{26.5}	1^{8}	3^{16.5}	4^{15}	64.5
3	(Qatar) Khalifa Al Attiyah				2^{19.5}	1^{27}	46.5
4	(Spain) Gerard Farrés Guell		2^{19}				19
5	(Portugal) Lorenço Rosa					3^{16.5}	16.5
6	(Portugal) Alexandre Ré			2^{6}			6
Pos	Driver	RUS (Russia)	POL (Poland)	POR (Portugal)	SAU1 (Saudi Arabia)	SAU2 (Saudi Arabia)	Points

==== Teams championship ====
Pos	Driver	RUS (Russia)	POL (Poland)	POR (Portugal)	SAU1 (Saudi Arabia)	SAU2 (Saudi Arabia)	Points
1	(Germany) South Racing			11	43	43	97
2	(Germany) Monster Energy Can-Am		43	8	15	15	81
3	(Netherlands) Kees Koolen		15				15
Pos	Driver	RUS (Russia)	POL (Poland)	POR (Portugal)	SAU1 (Saudi Arabia)	SAU2 (Saudi Arabia)	Points
