= 2014 FIA Cross Country Rally World Cup =

2014 FIA Cross Country Rally World Cup
Previous:	2013	Next:	2015

The 2014 FIA Cross Country Rally World Cup season was the 22nd season of the FIA Cross Country Rally World Cup. Vladimir Vasilyev in Mini was the champion.

== Calendar ==
The calendar for the 2014 season featured ten rallies. Some of the rallies are also part of FIM Cross-Country Rallies World Championship and the FIM Bajas World Cup.

The six Bajas award 30 points to the winner, whereas the other four races are worth 60 points for the winner.

Round	Dates	Rally name
1	14–16 February	Baja Russia Northern Forest
2	14–16 March	(Italy) Italian Baja
3	4–10 April	(United Arab Emirates) Abu Dhabi Desert Challenge
4	20–25 April	(Qatar) Sealine Cross-Country Rally
5	18–25 May	(Egypt) Rallye des Pharaons
6	18–20 July	(Spain) Baja Aragón
7	14–17 August	(Hungary) Hungarian Baja
8	28–31 August	Baja Poland
9	3–9 October	(Morocco) OiLibya Rally
10	30–1 November	(Portugal) Baja de Portalegre 500

== Results ==
Round	Rally name	Podium finishers			
Round	Rally name	Rank	Driver	Car	Time
1	Baja Russia Northern Forest	1	(Saudi Arabia) Yazeed Al-Rajhi (Germany) Timo Gottschalk	Toyota Hilux Overdrive	3h36m09s
1	Baja Russia Northern Forest	2	(Russia) Vladimir Vasilyev (Russia) Konstantin Zhiltsov	Mini All 4 Racing	3h37m57s
1	Baja Russia Northern Forest	3	(Brazil) Reinaldo Varela (Brazil) Gustavo Gugelmin	Toyota Hilux Overdrive	3h42m25s
2	(Italy) Italian Baja	1	(Saudi Arabia) Yazeed Al-Rajhi (Germany) Timo Gottschalk	Toyota Hilux Overdrive	3h17m15s
2	(Italy) Italian Baja	2	(Russia) Boris Gadasin (Russia) Aleksei Kuzmich	G-Force Proto	3h17m59s
2	(Italy) Italian Baja	3	(Poland) Marek Dabrowski (Poland) Jacek Czachor	Toyota Hilux	3h19m07s
3	(United Arab Emirates) Abu Dhabi Desert Challenge	1	(Russia) Vladimir Vasilyev (Russia) Konstantin Zhiltsov	Mini All 4 Racing	17h10m19s
3	(United Arab Emirates) Abu Dhabi Desert Challenge	2	(Poland) Adam Malysz (Poland) Rafal Marton	Toyota Hilux	17h58m14s
3	(United Arab Emirates) Abu Dhabi Desert Challenge	3	(Czech Republic) Miroslav Zapletal (Poland) Maciej Marton	Hummer H3	18h29m58s
4	(Qatar) Sealine Cross-Country Rally	1	(Qatar) Nasser Al-Attiyah (France) Mathieu Baumel	Mini All 4 Racing	17h22m51s
4	(Qatar) Sealine Cross-Country Rally	2	(Russia) Vladimir Vasilyev (Russia) Konstantin Zhiltsov	Mini All 4 Racing	18h39m47s
4	(Qatar) Sealine Cross-Country Rally	3	(Poland) Marek Dabrowski (Poland) Jacek Czachor	Toyota Hilux	18h59m47
5	(Egypt) Rallye des Pharaons	1	(Saudi Arabia) Yazeed Al-Rajhi (Germany) Timo Gottschalk	Toyota Hilux Overdrive	14h07m09s
5	(Egypt) Rallye des Pharaons	2	(Qatar) Nasser Al-Attiyah (France) Mathieu Baumel	Mini All 4 Racing	14h12m35s
5	(Egypt) Rallye des Pharaons	3	(Netherlands) Erik van Loon (France) Rosegaar Wouter	Mini All 4 Racing	15h38m25s
6	(Spain) Baja Aragón	1	(Spain) Nani Roma (France) Michel Perin	Mini All 4 Racing	9h21m24s
6	(Spain) Baja Aragón	2	(Argentina) Orlando Terranova (Spain) Moises Torrallardona	Mini All 4 Racing	9h21m49s
6	(Spain) Baja Aragón	3	(Poland) Martin Kaczmarski (Finland) Tapio Suominen	Mini All 4 Racing	9h39m51s
7	(Hungary) Hungarian Baja	1	(Qatar) Nasser Al-Attiyah (France) Mathieu Baumel	Toyota Hilux	4h04m34s
7	(Hungary) Hungarian Baja	2	(Russia) Vladimir Vasilyev (Russia) Konstantin Zhiltsov	Mini All 4 Racing	4h16m43s
7	(Hungary) Hungarian Baja	3	(Argentina) Orlando Terranova (Spain) Moises Torrallardona	Mini All 4 Racing	4h23m04s
8	Baja Poland	1	(Poland) Krzysztof Holowczyc (France) Xavier Panseri	Mini All 4 Racing	5h22m36.6s
8	Baja Poland	2	(Poland) Adam Małysz (Poland) Rafał Marton	Toyota Hilux Overdrive	5h27m57.5s
8	Baja Poland	3	(Poland) Martin Kaczmarsk (Finland) Tapio Suominen	Mini All 4 Racing	5h32m13.4s
9	(Morocco) OiLibya Rally	1	(Qatar) Nasser Al-Attiyah (France) Mathieu Baumel	Mini All 4 Racing	16h12m15s
9	(Morocco) OiLibya Rally	2	(Argentina) Orlando Terranova (Argentina) Rolando Graue	Mini All 4 Racing	16h13m57s
9	(Morocco) OiLibya Rally	3	(Netherlands) Erik van Loon (Netherlands) Wouter Rosegaar	Mini All 4 Racing	
10	(Portugal) Baja de Portalegre 500	1	(Portugal) Ricardo Porém (Portugal) Manuel Porém	Mini All 4 Racing	5h25m37s
10	(Portugal) Baja de Portalegre 500	2	(Qatar) Nasser Al-Attiyah (France) Mathieu Baumel	Ford HRX	5h27m10s
10	(Portugal) Baja de Portalegre 500	3	(Brazil) Reinaldo Varela (Brazil) Gustavo Gugelmin	Toyota Hilux Overdrive	5h28m17s

== Drivers' Championship ==
- Points for final position are awarded as in the following table

Position	1st	2nd	3rd	4th	5th	6th	7th	8th	9th	10th
Points	25	18	15	12	10	8	6	4	2	1

- Additional points are given according to group classification (T1, T2 and T3):

Position	1st	2nd	3rd
Points	5	3	1

- A coefficient 2 is applied to Cross Country rallies.

Pos	Driver	RUS (Russia)	ITA (Italy)	ABU (United Arab Emirates)	QAT (Qatar)	PHA (Egypt)	ARA (Spain)	HUN (Hungary)	POL (Poland)	MAR (Morocco)	POR (Portugal)	Points
1	(Russia) Vladimir Vasilyev	2^{21}	4^{12}	1^{60}	2^{42}	4^{24}	4^{12}	2^{21}	22^{0}	4^{24}	6^{8}	224
2	(Qatar) Nasser Al-Attiyah	-	-	-	1^{60}	2^{42}	8^{4}	1^{30}	-	1^{60}	2^{21}	217
3	(Saudi Arabia) Yazeed Al-Rajhi	1^{30}	1^{30}	Ret^{0}	Ret^{0}	1^{60}	Ret^{0}	-	-	-	-	120
4	(Czech Republic) Miroslav Zapletal	Ret^{0}	11^{0}	3^{32}	6^{16}	5^{20}	7^{6}	4^{12}	6^{8}	9^{4}	9^{2}	100
5	(Poland) Marek Dabrowski	5^{10}	3^{16}	7^{12}	3^{32}	7^{12}	10^{1}	8^{4}	7^{12}	-	-	99
6	(Poland) Adam Malysz	-	Ret^{0}	2^{42}	4^{24}	-	9^{2}	-	2^{21}	-	-	89
7	(Netherlands) Erik van Loon	-	-	6^{16}	-	3^{32}	Ret^{0}	-	-	3^{32}	-	80
8	(Argentina) Orlando Terranova	-	-	-	-	-	2^{21}	3^{16}	-	2^{42}	-	79
9	(Brazil) Reinaldo Varela	3^{16}	7^{6}	9^{4}	5^{20}	-	5^{10}	-	-	-	3^{16}	72
10	(Poland) Martin Kaczmarski	4^{12}	5^{10}	-	Ret^{0}	-	3^{16}	-	3^{16}	-	-	54
Pos	Driver	RUS (Russia)	ITA (Italy)	ABU (United Arab Emirates)	QAT (Qatar)	PHA (Egypt)	ARA (Spain)	HUN (Hungary)	POL (Poland)	MAR (Morocco)	POR (Portugal)	Points

70 Drivers have been classified
