= FIA World Baja Cup =

World baja rally motorsport series

- Category: Cross-country bajas
- Country: International
- Inaugural season: 2002
- Drivers' champion: (Argentina) Juan Cruz Yacopini (O/A) (United Arab Emirates) Sergei Remennik (T3) (Netherlands) Mitchel van den Brink (T4)
- Co-Drivers' champion: (Spain) Daniel Oliveras (O/A)
- Teams' champion: South Racing Can-Am (O/A)
- Official website: FIA World Baja Cup

The FIA World Baja Cup, formerly known as the FIA World Cup for Cross-Country Bajas, is a baja rally series organized by the FIA, culminating with a champion driver, co-driver, and team across each category.

== History ==
Starting with the 2002 season, the previous FIA's International Cup for Cross-Country Bajas was joined with the FIA Cross-Country Rally World Cup to form the FIA World Cup for Cross-Country Rallies. From the beginning of the 2019 season the cup was once again split, with the World Cup for Cross Country Bajas being held alongside the competition for "baja" style rally raids.

It was renamed to the World Baja Cup in 2024.

From the 2022 season, the competition runs separately to the World Rally-Raid Championship, and together with the FIM Bajas World Cup. It also has regional counterparts with the FIA European Baja Cup and FIA Middle East Baja Cup.

== Champions ==
Season	Driver	Co-driver	Car	2nd	3rd	Designation
2002	(France) Jean-Louis Schlesser	(Andorra) Henri Magne	Buggy Schlesser	(Portugal) Miguel Barbosa	(Russia) Mikhail Naryshkin	FIA European Cup for Cross-Country Bajas
2003	(Portugal) Carlos Sousa	(Andorra) Henri Magne	Mitsubishi	(Portugal) Miguel Barbosa	(Japan) Hiroshi Masuoka (France) Luc Alphand	FIA European Cup for Cross-Country Bajas
2004	(Portugal) Carlos Sousa	(Andorra) Henri Magne	Mitsubishi	(United Arab Emirates) Khalifa Al-Mutaiwei	(United Kingdom) Colin McRae	FIA European Cup for Cross-Country Bajas
2005	(Spain) Marc Blazquez	(Spain) Ignacio Salvador	Nissan Pick-Up D22	(Portugal) Rui Sousa	(Spain) Joan Roma (France) Luc Alphand (Qatar) Nasser Al-Attiyah	FIA International Cup for Cross-Country Bajas
2006	(Spain) Marc Blazquez	(Spain) Jordi Mercader	Nissan Navara	(Slovakia) Josef Sykora	(Portugal) Edi Orioli (Portugal) Carlos Sousa (Portugal) Miguel Barbosa	FIA International Cup for Cross-Country Bajas
2007	(Russia) Boris Gadasin	(Russia) Alexandr Mironenko	Nissan	(Qatar) Hamad bin Eid Al-Thani	(Czech Republic) Miroslav Zapletal	FIA International Cup for Cross-Country Bajas
2008	(Qatar) Nasser Al-Attiyah	(Sweden) Tina Thörner	BMW X-Raid	(Russia) Boris Gadasin	(Netherlands) Tonnie van Deijne	FIA International Cup for Cross-Country Bajas
2009	(Russia) Boris Gadazin	(Russia) Vladimir Demyanenko	Nissan Overdrive	(Czech Republic) Miroslav Zapletal	(Netherlands) Tonnie van Deijne	FIA International Cup for Cross-Country Bajas
2010	(Poland) Krzysztof Hołowczyc	(Belgium) Jean-Marc Fortin	Nissan Navara	(Russia) Boris Gadasin	(Russia) Bogdan Novitskiy	FIA International Cup for Cross-Country Bajas
2011–2018	Merged with FIA Cross-Country Rally World Cup					
2019	(Argentina) Orlando Terranova	(Argentina) Ronnie Graue	Mini JCW Rally X-Raid	(Poland) Jakub Przygonski	(Russia) Vladimir Vasilyev	FIA World Cup for Cross-Country Bajas
2020	(Russia) Vladimir Vasilyev	(Belgium) Tom Colsoul	Mini JCW Rally X-Raid	(Netherlands) Bernhard ten Brinke	(Qatar) Nasser Al-Attiyah	FIA World Cup for Cross-Country Bajas
2021	(Saudi Arabia) Yazeed Al-Rajhi	(Republic of Ireland) Michael Orr	Toyota Hilux	(Saudi Arabia) Yasir Seaidan	(Poland) Krzysztof Hołowczyc	FIA World Cup for Cross-Country Bajas
2022	(Saudi Arabia) Yazeed Al-Rajhi	(Germany) Dirk V. Zitzewitz	Toyota Hilux	(Czech Republic) Miroslav Zapletal	(Argentina) Fernando Alvarez	FIA World Cup for Cross-Country Bajas
2023	(Qatar) Nasser Al-Attiyah	(France) Mathieu Baumel	Toyota Hilux Dakar	(Saudi Arabia) Yazeed Al-Rajhi	(Portugal) Joao Ferreira	FIA World Cup for Cross-Country Bajas
2024	(Portugal) João Ferreira	(Portugal) Filipe Palmeiro	X-Raid Mini JCW Team	(Argentina) Fernando Alvarez	(Spain) Eduardo Pons	FIA World Baja Cup
2025	(Argentina) Juan Cruz Yacopini	(Spain) Daniel Oliveras	Toyota Hilux Overdrive	(Netherlands) Mitchel van den Brink	(United Arab Emirates) Sergei Remennik	FIA World Baja Cup

== See also ==
- Rally raid
