= Northern Forest (race) =

The Northern Forest (Северный лес) is a baja rally in St. Petersburg, Russia. The event is part of the FIA World Cup for Cross-Country Bajas, and is part of the Russian national season. It is run on ice and snow in late February. Entrants need an FIA competition license.

The rally shares some of the sections that were used in the White Nights rally. The average temperature during the rally is usually round the −10 °C (14 °F).

== History ==
The race began in 2002 as a Russian Cup event. Two years later it became part of the Russian Championship. It became an international race in 2006, and it was added to the FIA calendar in 2007. In 2009, it was incorporated to the FIA World Cup for Cross-Country Bajas.

== Winners ==
Year	Driver	Codriver	Car
2003	(Russia) Sergey Shmakov	(Russia) Evgeniy Kandzuba	Bowler Wildcat 200
2004	(Russia) Ruslan Misikov	(Russia) Sergey Shatinskiy	Bowler Wildcat
2005	(Russia) Alexey Berkut	(Russia) Anton Nikolaev	Mitsubishi L200
2006	(Russia) Alexey Berkut	(Russia) Anton Nikolaev	Mitsubishi Pajero
2007	(Russia) Boris Gadasin	(Russia) Alexander Mironenko	Nissan Pickup
2008	(Russia) Leonid Novitskiy	(Russia) Oleg Tyupenkin	Mitsubishi L200
2009	(Russia) Boris Gadasin	(Russia) Vladimir Demyanenko	G-Force Proto
2010	(Russia) Boris Gadasin	(Russia) Vladimir Demyanenko	G-Force Proto
2011–2012 Not Held
2013	(Russia) Vladimir Vasilyev	(Russia) Konstantin Zhiltsov	G-Force Proto
2014	(Saudi Arabia) Yazeed Al-Rajhi	(Germany) Timo Gottschalk	Toyota Hilux Overdrive
2015	(Finland) Tapio Suominen	(Finland) Toni Näsman	Toyota Hilux Overdrive
2016	(Latvia) Māris Neikšāns	(Russia) Anton Nikolaev	Volkswagen 7JO
2017	(Poland) Aron Domzala	(Poland) Szymon Gospodarczyk	Toyota Hilux
2018	(Qatar) Nasser Al-Attiyah	(France) Mathieu Baumel	Toyota Hilux Overdrive
2019	(Finland) Tapio Lauronen	(Finland) Toni Lauronen	Mitsubishi Pajero
2020	(Russia) Vladimir Vasilyev	(Ukraine) Vitaliy Yevtyekhov	BMW X3
2021	(Russia) Vladimir Vasilyev	(Russia) Alexsey Kuzmich	BMW X3
2022	(Russia) Vladimir Vasilyev	(Latvia) Oleg Uperenko	Mini All4 Racing
2023	(Russia) Dmitriy Mordkovich	(Russia) Ivan Bezdenezhnikh	Can-Am Maverick X3
2024	(Russia) Boris Gadasin	(Russia) Dmitriy Kozhukhov	G-Force T3 GF
2025	(Russia) Boris Gadasin	(Russia) Dmitriy Kozhukhov	G-Force Bars

== Eligible vehicles ==
Group T1: Improved Cross-Country Cars prepared according to the Appendix. «J» of the International Sporting Code Art. 285.

Classes:

T1.1 4x4 Gasoline

T1.2 4x4 Diesel

T1.3 4x2 Gasoline

T1.4 4x2 Diesel

Group T2: Cross-Country Series Production Cars prepared according to the Appendix. «J» of the International Sporting Code Art. 284.

Classes:

T2.1 Gasoline

T2.2 diesel
