= Mini All4 Racing =

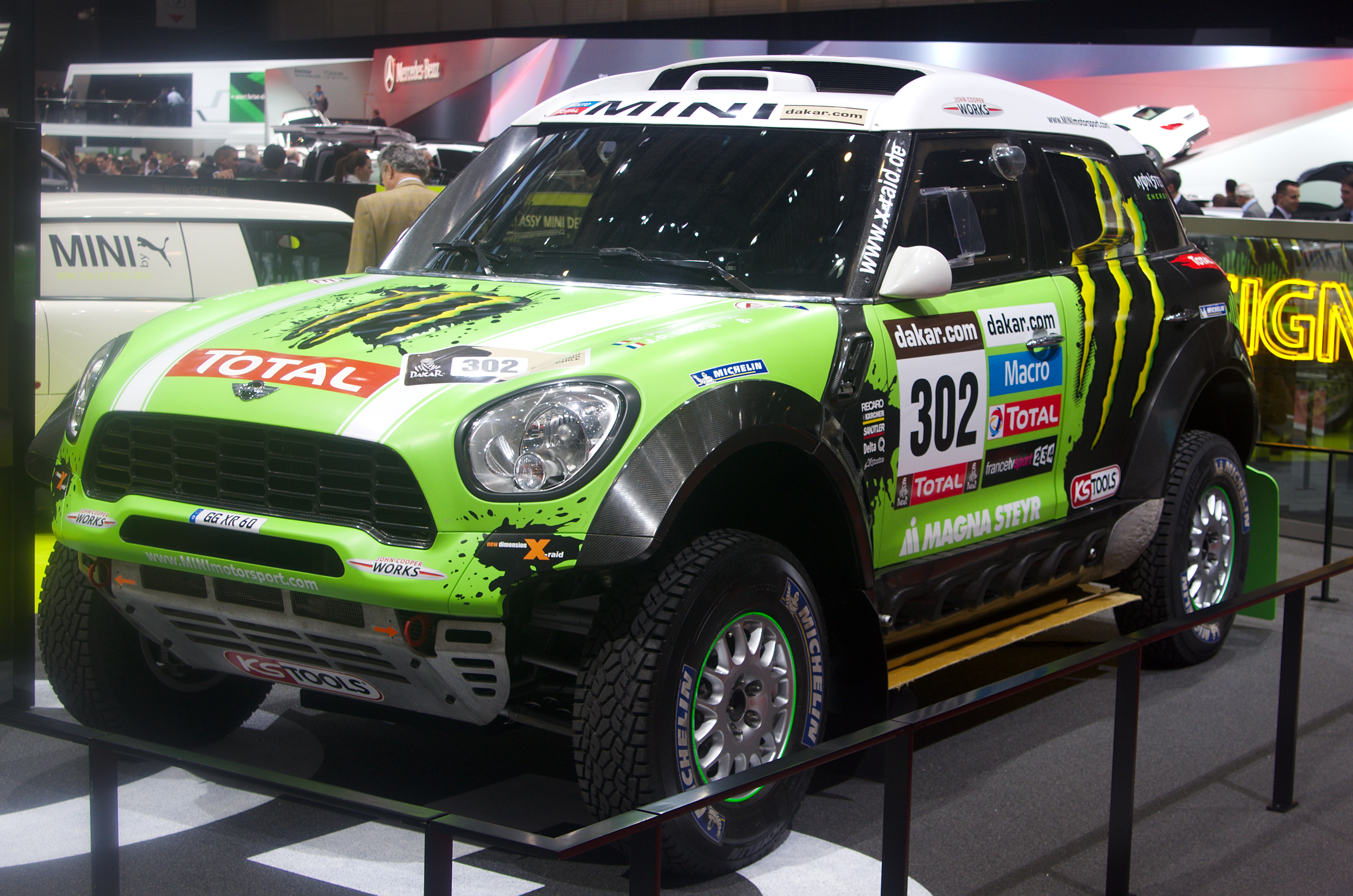

Overview
- Manufacturer: BMW (Mini)
- Production: 2011–2016

Body and chassis
- Class: Rally raid
- Body style: 3-door SUV
- Layout: F4 Layout

Powertrain
- Engine: 3.0 L Turbodiesel I6
- Transmission: 6-speed dual-clutch

Dimensions
- Wheelbase: 2,900 mm (114 in)
- Length: 4,350 mm (171 in)
- Width: 1,998 mm (79 in)
- Height: 1,996 mm (79 in)

Chronology
- Successor: Mini John Cooper Works Rally; Mini John Cooper Works Buggy

The Mini All4 Racing is an off-road competition car, built by X-raid between 2011 and 2015, specially designed to take part in the rally raids with the main objective of winning the Dakar Rally. In 2017 Mini All4 Racing was succeeded by Mini John Cooper Works Rally.

== Dakar victories ==
Year	Driver	Co-driver
2012	(France) Stéphane Peterhansel	(France) Jean-Paul Cottret
2013	(France) Stéphane Peterhansel	(France) Jean-Paul Cottret
2014	(Spain) Nani Roma	(France) Michel Périn
2015	(Qatar) Nasser Al-Attiyah	(France) Matthieu Baumel

== Other victories ==
- 2011 Abu Dhabi Desert Challenge (Stéphane Peterhansel and Jean-Paul Cottret)
- 2013 Rallye du Maroc (Orlando Terranova and Paulo Fuiza)
- 2013 Desafio Ruta 40 (Nani Roma and Michel Périn)
- 2013 Abu Dhabi Desert Challenge (Nani Roma and Michel Périn)
- 2014 Rallye du Maroc (Nasser Al-Attiyah and Mathieu Baumel)
- 2014 Desafio Inca (Nani Roma and Michel Périn)
- 2014 Abu Dhabi Desert Challenge (Vladimir Vasilyev and Konstantin Zhiltsov)
- 2015 Rallye du Maroc (Nasser Al-Attiyah and Mathieu Baumel)
- 2015 Abu Dhabi Desert Challenge (Vladimir Vasilyev and Konstantin Zhiltsov)
- 2018 Silk Way Rally (Yazeed Al Rajhi, Timo Gottschalk)

The team also took the teams championship in the 2019 and 2020 FIA World Cup for Cross-Country Bajas.

== See also ==
- Mini
- Mini Countryman
- Mini John Cooper Works WRC
- X-raid
- Mini John Cooper Works Buggy
