= Mitsubishi Racing Lancer =

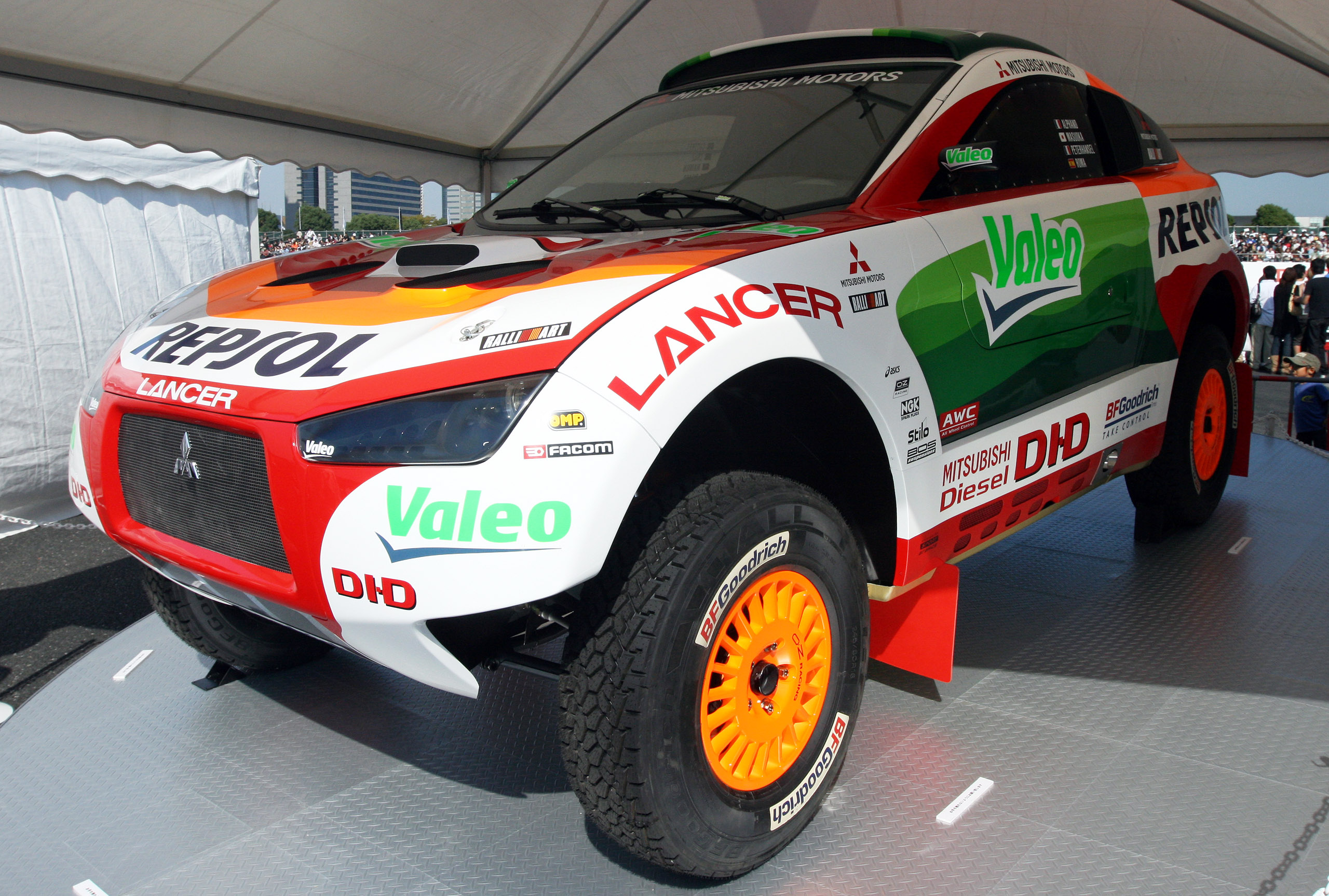

Overview
- Manufacturer: Mitsubishi Motors
- Also called: MRX09
- Production: 2008–present

Body and chassis
- Class: Rally Raid car
- Layout: Four-wheel drive
- Platform: Mitsubishi GS platform
- Related: Mitsubishi Pajero Evolution; Mitsubishi Lancer; Mitsubishi Lancer Evolution

Powertrain
- Engine: 2,997cc V6 turbodiesel
- Transmission: Ricardo five-speed sequential, manual

Dimensions
- Wheelbase: 2,900 mm (114.2 in)
- Length: 4,475 mm (176.2 in)
- Width: 1,990 mm (78.3 in)
- Height: 1,395 mm (54.9 in)
- Curb weight: 1,900 kg (4,190 lb)

Chronology
- Predecessor: Mitsubishi Pajero Evolution MPR13

The Mitsubishi Racing Lancer (code-named MRX09) is a cross-country rally car developed by Mitsubishi Motors for competing in 2009 Dakar rally. "MRX09" stands for Mitsubishi Rally X-Country. The car was built to the FIA's Group T1 rules, and competed in the 2009 Dakar Rally. It has a tubular steel frame with carbon fiber bodywork. Unlike previous Mitsubishi cross-country rally cars, the Racing Lancer's bodywork resembles the Mitsubishi Lancer Sportback instead of the Mitsubishi Pajero.
