= X-raid =

German motorsport team

X‑raid
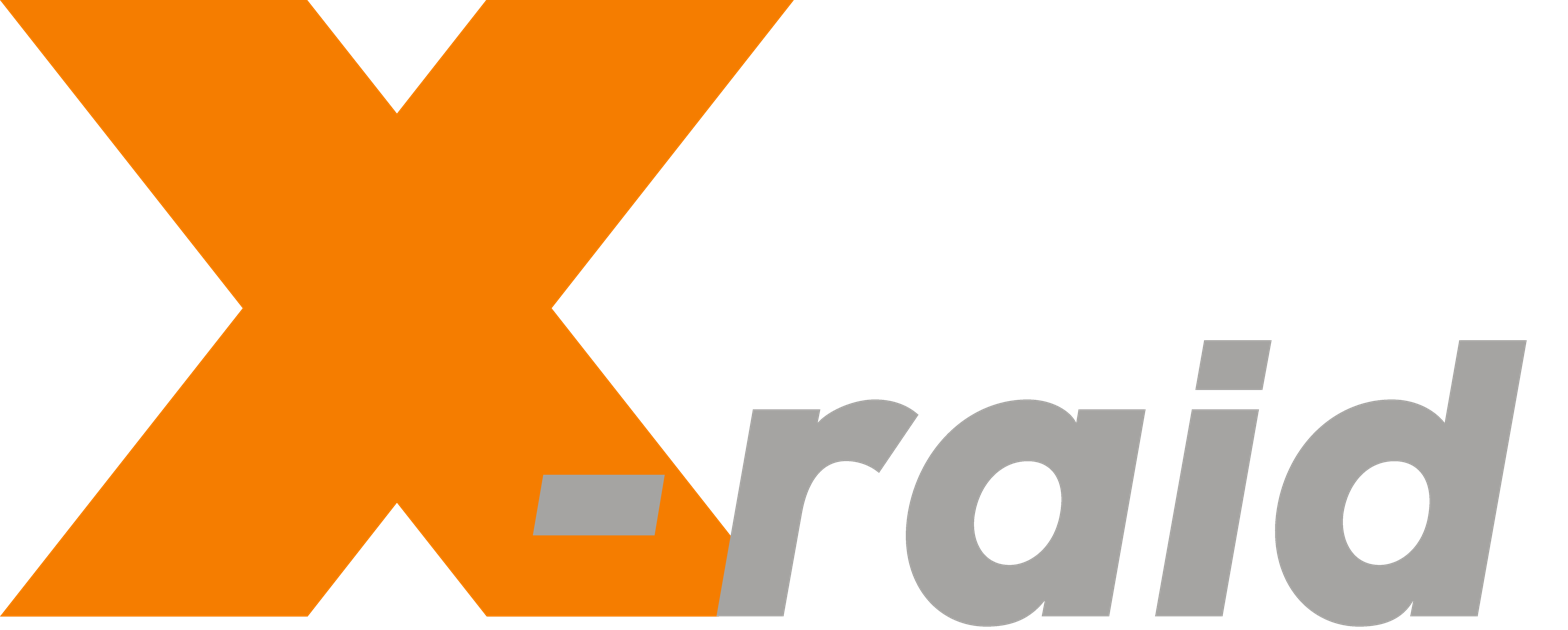
- Full name: X‑raid GmbH
- Base: Trebur, Hesse, Germany
- Team principal(s): Sven Quandt

World Rally Championship history
- Debut: 2002
- Last event: 2025 Dakar Rally
- Manufacturers' Championships: 0
- Drivers' Championships: 0
- Rally wins: 6 (Dakar Rally 2012, 2013, 2014, 2015, 2020, 2021)

X-raid is a private German rally team based in Trebur. It has been competing in cross-country rallies since 2002, including the Dakar Rally. The company is based in Trebur near Frankfurt am Main. Since 2002, vehicles for the Dakar Rally and individual cross-country rally events worldwide as well as the FIA World Cup for Cross-Country Rallies have been developed and built there. The X-raid team has won thirteen World Cup titles since its inception and the car category of the legendary Dakar Rally in 2012, 2013, 2014, 2015, 2020, and 2021.

In addition, X-raid also sells aftermarket parts for Mini Countryman, under their "Powered by X-raid" label.

== Successes ==
Winner of the Cross Country Championship Portugal

Year	Driver/Co-driver	Nationality	Car
2008	Filipe Campos/Jaime Baptista	Portugal / Portugal	BMW X3 CC
2009	Filipe Campos/Jaime Baptista	Portugal / Portugal	BMW X3 CC
2010	Filipe Campos/Jaime Baptista	Portugal / Portugal	BMW X5 CC
2014	Ricardo Porém/Manuel Porém	Portugal / Portugal	MINI ALL4 Racing

Winner of the Silk Way Rally

Year	Driver/Co-driver	Nationality	Car
2011	Krzysztof Holowczyc /Jean-Marc Fortin	Poland / Belgium	BMW X3 CC
2018	Yazeed Al-Rajhi/Timo Gottschalk	Saudi Arabia / Germany	MINI John Cooper Works Rally

Winner of the FIA World Cup for Cross-Country Bajas

Year	Driver/Co-driver	Nationality	Car
2008	Nasser Saleh Al-Attiyah/Christina „Tina“ Thörner	Qatar / Sweden	BMW X3 CC
2019	Orlando Terranova/Ronnie Graue	Argentina / Argentina	MINI John Cooper Works Rally
2020	Vladimir Vasilyev	Russia	MINI John Cooper Works Rally

Winner of the FIA Cross Country Rally World Cup

Year	Driver/Co-driver	Nationality	Car
2004	Khalifa Al Mutaiwei/Alain Guehennec	United Arab Emirates / France	BMW X5 CC
2008	Nasser Al-Attiyah/Kristina „Tina“ Thörner	Qatar / Sweden	BMW X3 CC
2009	Guerlain Chicherit/Christina „Tina“ Thörner	France / Sweden	BMW X3 CC
2010	Leonid Novitskiy/Andreas Schulz	Russia / Germany	BMW X3 CC
2011	Leonid Novitsky/Andreas Schulz	Russia / Germany	BMW X3 CC

Winner of the FIA World Cup for Cross-Country Rallies

Year	Driver/Co-driver	Nationality	Car
2012	Khalifa Al Mutaiwei/Andreas Schulz	United Arab Emirates / Germany	MINI ALL4 Racing
2013	Krzysztof Holowczyc /Andreas Schulz	Poland / Germany	MINI ALL4 Racing
2014	Vladimir Vasilyev /Konstantin Zhiltsov	Russia / Russia	MINI ALL4 Racing
2015	Nasser Al-Attiyah/Mathieu Baumel	Qatar / France	MINI ALL4 Racing
2018	Jakub Przygonski/Tom Colsoul	Poland / Belgium	MINI John Cooper Works Rally
2019	Stéphane Peterhansel/Andrea Peterhansel	France / Germany	MINI John Cooper Works Buggy

Winner of the Dakar Rally

Year	Driver/Co-driver	Nationality	Car
2012	Stéphane Peterhansel/Jean-Paul Cottret	France / France	Mini ALL4 Racing
2013	Stéphane Peterhansel/Jean-Paul Cottret	France / France	MINI ALL4 Racing
2014	Nani Roma/Michel Périn	Spain / France	MINI ALL4 Racing
2015	Nasser Al-Attiyah/Mathieu Baumel	Qatar / France	MINI ALL4 Racing
2020	Carlos Sainz/Lucas Cruz	Spain / Spain	MINI John Cooper Works Buggy
2021	Stéphane Peterhansel/Edouard Boulanger	France / France	MINI John Cooper Works Buggy

== Placements at the Dakar Rally ==
Paris-Dakar 2005 (Africa)

Place	Driver/Co-driver	Nationality	Car
9.	José Luis Monterde/Rafa Tornabell	Spain / Spain	BMW X5 CC

Paris-Dakar 2006 (Africa)

Place	Driver/Co-driver	Nationality	Car
9.	Guerlain Chicherit/Mathieu Baumel	France / France	BMW X3 CC
15.	Alfie Cox/Ralph Pitchford	South Africa / South Africa	BMW X3 CC
24.	José Luis Monterde/Tiziano Siviero	Spain / Italy	BMW X3 CC

Paris-Dakar 2007 (Africa)

Place	Driver/Co-driver	Nationality	Car
6.	Nasser Saleh Al-Attiyah/Alain Guehennec	Qatar / France	BMW X3 CC
15.	Jutta Kleinschmidt/Christina „Tina“ Thörner	Germany / Sweden	BMW X3 CC
16.	José Luis Monterde/Jean-Marie Lurguin	Spain / France	BMW X5 CC
37.	Paulo Nobre/Filippe Palmeiro	Brazil / Portugal	BMW X5 CC

Dakar 2009 (Argentina, Chile)

Place	Driver/Co-driver	Nationality	Car
8.	Leonid Novitskiy/Oleg Tyupenkin	Russia / Russia	BMW X3 CC
9.	Guerlain Chicherit/Mathieu Baumel	France / France	BMW X3 CC
18.	René Kuipers/Filipe Palmeiro	Netherlands / Portugal	BMW X3 CC

Dakar 2010 (Argentina, Chile)

Place	Driver/Co-driver	Nationality	Car
4.	Stéphane Peterhansel/Jean-Paul Cottret	France / France	BMW X3 CC
5.	Guerlain Chicherit/Christina „Tina“ Thörner	France / Sweden	BMW X3 CC
11.	Leonid Novitskiy/Andreas Schulz	Russia / Germany	BMW X3 CC

Dakar 2011 (Argentina, Chile)

Place	Driver/Co-driver	Nationality	Car
4.	Stéphane Peterhansel/Jean-Paul Cottret	France / France	BMW X3 CC
5.	Krzysztof Holowczyc/Jean-Marc Fortin	Poland / Belgium	BMW X3 CC
7.	Ricardo Leal Dos Santos/Paulo Fiúza	Portugal / Portugal	BMW X3 CC
20.	Stephan Schott/Holm Schmidt	Germany / Germany	BMW X3 CC

Dakar 2012 (Argentina, Chile, Peru)

Place	Driver/Co-driver	Nationality	Car
1.	Stéphane Peterhansel/Jean-Paul Cottret	France / France	MINI ALL4 Racing
2.	Nani Roma/Michel Perin	Spain / France	MINI ALL4 Racing
4.	Leonid Novitskiy/Andreas Schulz	Russia / Germany	MINI ALL4 Racing
7.	Ricardo Leal Dos Santos/Paulo Fiúza	Portugal / Portugal	MINI ALL4 Racing
9.	Krzysztof Holowczyc/Jean-Marc Fortin	Poland / Belgium	MINI ALL4 Racing
11.	Boris Garafulic/Gilles Picard	Chile / France	BMW X3 CC
15.	Alexander Mironenko/Sergey Lebedev	Russia / Russia	BMW X3 CC
30.	Stephan Schott/Holm Schmidt	Germany / Germany	BMW X3 CC

Dakar 2013 (Argentina, Chile, Peru)

Place	Driver/Co-driver	Nationality	Car
1.	Stéphane Peterhansel/Jean-Paul Cottret	France / France	MINI ALL4 Racing
3.	Leonid Novitskiy/Konstantin Zhiltsov	Russia / Russia	MINI ALL4 Racing
4.	Nani Roma/Michel Perin	Spain / France	MINI ALL4 Racing
5.	Orlando Terranova/Paulo Fiúza	Argentina / Portugal	BMW X3 CC
12.	Boris Garafulic/Gilles Picard	Chile / France	MINI ALL4 Racing
48.	Stephan Schott/Holm Schmidt	Germany / Germany	MINI ALL4 Racing

Dakar 2014 (Argentina, Bolivia, Chile)

Place	Driver/Co-driver	Nationality	Car
1.	Nani Roma/Michel Périn	Spain / France	MINI ALL4 Racing
2.	Stéphane Peterhansel/Jean-Paul Cottret	France / France	MINI ALL4 Racing
3.	Nasser Saleh Al-Attiyah/Lucas Cruz	Qatar / Spain	MINI ALL4 Racing
5.	Orlando Terranova/Paulo Fiúza	Argentina / Portugal	MINI ALL4 Racing
6.	Krzysztof Holowczyc/Konstantin Zhiltsov	Poland / Russia	MINI ALL4 Racing
9.	Martin Kaczmarski/Filipe Palmeiro	Poland / Portugal	MINI ALL4 Racing
10.	Vladimir Vasilyev/Vitaliy Yevtyekhov	Russia / Ukraine	MINI ALL4 Racing
11.	Boris Garafulic/Gilles Picard	Chile / France	MINI ALL4 Racing
12.	Federico Villagra/Jorge Perez Companc	Argentina / Argentina	MINI ALL4 Racing
19.	Stephan Schott/Holm Schmidt	Germany / Germany	MINI ALL4 Racing
31.	Zhou Yong/Hong Yu Pan	China / China	MINI ALL4 Racing

Dakar 2015 (Argentina, Bolivia, Chile)

Place	Driver/Co-driver	Nationality	Car
1.	Nasser Saleh Al-Attiyah/Mathieu Baumel	Qatar / France	MINI All4 Racing
3.	Krzysztof Holowczyc/Xavier Panseri	Poland / France	MINI ALL4 Racing
4.	Erik van Loon/Wouter Rosegaar	Netherlands / Netherlands	MINI ALL4 Racing
5.	Vladimir Vasilyev/Konstantin Zhiltsov	Russia / Russia	MINI ALL4 Racing
9.	Aidyn Rakhimbayev/Anton Nikolaev	Kazakhstan / Russia	MINI ALL4 Racing
12.	Boris Garafulic/Filipe Palmeiro	Chile / Portugal	MINI ALL4 Racing
13.	Yong Zhou/Andreas Schulz	China / Germany	MINI ALL4 Racing
18.	Orlando Terranova/Bernardo Graue	Argentina / Argentina	MINI ALL4 Racing
22.	Stephan Schott/Holm Schmidt	Germany / Germany	MINI ALL4 Racing

Dakar 2016 (Argentina, Bolivia, Chile)

Place	Driver/Co-driver	Nationality	Car
2.	Nasser Saleh Al-Attiyah/Mathieu Baumel	Qatar / France	MINI ALL4 Racing
4.	Mikko Hirvonen/Michel Périn	Finland / France	MINI ALL4 Racing
6.	Nani Roma/Alex Haro	Spain / Spain	MINI ALL4 Racing
5.	Harry Hunt/Andreas Schulz	United Kingdom / Germany	MINI ALL4 Racing
12.	Orlando Terranova/Ronnie Graue	Argentina / Argentina	MINI ALL4 Racing
13.	Erik van Loon/Wouter Rosegaar	Netherlands / Netherlands	MINI ALL4 Racing
15.	Jakub Przygonski/Andrei Rudnitski	Poland / Belarus	MINI ALL4 Racing
23.	Boris Garafulic/Filipe Palmeiro	Chile / Portugal	MINI ALL4 Racing
43.	Nazareno Lopez/Sergio Lafuente	Argentina / Uruguay	MINI ALL4 Racing
52.	Adam Malysz/Xavier Panseri	Poland / France	MINI ALL4 Racing

Dakar 2017 (Argentina, Bolivia, Paraguay)

Place	Driver/Co-driver	Nationality	Car
6.	Orlando Terranova/Andreas Schulz	Argentina / Germany	MINI John Cooper Works Rally
7.	Jakub Przygonski/Tom Colsoul	Poland / Belgium	MINI ALL4 Racing
10.	Mohamed Abu Issa/Xavier Panseri	Qatar / France	MINI ALL4 Racing
13.	Mikko Hirvonen/Michel Périn	Finland / France	MINI John Cooper Works Rally
15.	Stephan Schott/Paulo Fiúza	Germany / Portugal	MINI ALL4 Racing
18.	Sylvio de Barros/Rafael Capoani	Brazil / Brazil	MINI ALL4 Racing
27.	Yazeed Al-Rajhi/Timo Gottschalk	Saudi Arabia / Germany	MINI John Cooper Works Rally

Dakar 2018 (Peru, Bolivia, Argentina)

Place	Driver/Co-driver	Nationality	Car
5.	Jakub Przygonski/Tom Colsoul	Poland / Belgium	MINI John Cooper Works Rally
13.	Boris Garafulic/Filipe Palmeiro	Chile / Portugal	MINI John Cooper Works Rally
19.	Mikko Hirvonen/Andreas Schulz	Finland / Germany	MINI John Cooper Works Buggy
20.	Orlando Terranova/Ronnie Graue	Argentina / Argentina	MINI John Cooper Works Rally

Dakar 2019 (Peru)

Place	Driver/Co-driver	Nationality	Car
2.	Nani Roma/Alex Haro Bravo	Spain / Spain	MINI John Cooper Works Rally
4.	Jakub Przygonski/Tom Colsoul	Poland / Belgium	MINI John Cooper Works Rally
5.	Cyril Despres/Jean-Paul Cottret	France / France	MINI John Cooper Works Buggy
7.	Yazeed Al-Rajhi/Timo Gottschalk	Saudi Arabia / Germany	MINI John Cooper Works Rally
8.	Boris Garafulic/Filipe Palmeiro	Chile / Portugal	MINI John Cooper Works Rally
13.	Carlos Sainz/Lucas Cruz	Spain / Spain	Mini John Cooper Works Buggy

Dakar 2020 (Saudi Arabia)

Place	Driver/Co-driver	Nationality	Car
1.	Carlos Sainz/Lucas Cruz	Spain / Spain	Mini John Cooper Works Buggy
3.	Stéphane Peterhansel/Paulo Fiúza	France / Portugal	Mini John Cooper Works Buggy
6.	Orlando Terranova/Ronnie Graue	Argentina / Argentina	MINI John Cooper Works Rally
9.	Yasir Seaidan/Alexey Kuzmich	Saudi Arabia / Russia	MINI John Cooper Works Rally
14.	Alexander Dorosinskiy/Oleg Uperenko	Russia/ Latvia	MINI ALL4 Racing
17.	Denis Krotov / Dmitry Tsyro	Russia/ Ukraine	MINI John Cooper Works Rally
19.	Jakub Przygonski / Timo Gottschalk	Poland/ Germany	MINI John Cooper Works Rally

Dakar 2021 (Saudi Arabia)

Place	Driver/Co-driver	Nationality	Car
1.	Stéphane Peterhansel / Edouard Boulanger	France / France	MINI John Cooper Works Buggy
3.	Carlos Sainz / Lucas Cruz	Spain / Spain	MINI John Cooper Works Buggy
6.	Vladimir Vasilyev / Dmitry Tsyro	Russia/ Ukraine	MINI John Cooper Works Rally
17.	Guiga Spinelli / Youssef Haddad	Brazil / Brazil	MINI ALL4 Racing
24.	Victor Khoroshavtsev / Anton Nikolaev	Russia / Russia	MINI John Cooper Works Rally
30.	Denis Krotov / Oleg Uperenko	Russia / Russia	MINI John Cooper Works Rally

Dakar 2022 (Saudi Arabia)

Place	Driver/Co-driver	Nationality	Car
6.	Jakub Przygonski / Timo Gottschalk	Poland/ Germany	MINI John Cooper Works Buggy
8.	Sebastian Halpern / Ronnie Graue	Argentina / Argentina	MINI John Cooper Works Buggy
11.	Vaidotas Zala / Paulo Fiuza	Lithuania / Portugal	MINI John Cooper Works Rally
23.	Laia Sanz / Maurizio Gerini	Spain / Italy	MINI ALL4 Racing
28.	Denis Krotov / Konstantin Zhiltsov	Russia / Russia	MINI John Cooper Works Buggy

Dakar 2023 (Saudi Arabia) - car category

Jahr	Fahrer / Beifahrer	Nationalität	Fahrzeug
9.	Sebastian Halpern / Ronnie Graue	Argentina / Argentina	MINI John Cooper Works Rally Plus
16.	Khalid Al-Qassimi / Ola Floene	United Arab Emirates / Norway	MINI John Cooper Works Buggy
17.	Jakub Przygoński / Armand Monleon	Poland / Spain	MINI John Cooper Works Rally Plus
21.	Denis Krotov / Konstantin Zhiltsov		MINI John Cooper Works Buggy

Dakar 2023 (Saudi-Arabien) - T3 Kategorie

Jahr	Fahrer / Beifahrer	Nationalität	Fahrzeug
10.	Ignacio Casale / Alvaro Leon	Chile / Spain	X-raid YXZ1000R Turbo Prototype
12.	Ricardo Porém / Augusto Sanz	Portugal / Argentina	X-raid YXZ1000R Turbo Prototype
17.	Ahmed Alkuwari / Manuel Lucchese	Qatar / Italy	X-raid YXZ1000R Turbo Prototype
35.	Camelia Liparoti / Xavier Blanco	Italy / Spain	X-raid YXZ1000R Turbo Prototype
37.	Joao Ferreira / Filipe Palmeiro	Portugal / Portugal	X-raid YXZ1000R Turbo Prototype

== See also ==
- BMW Motorsport
- Mini John Cooper Works WRC
