= Vladimir Vasilyev (rally driver) =

Russian rally raid driver

- Nationality: Russian
- Born: 11 August 1969 (age 57) Tver, Russian SFSR, Soviet Union

Championship titles
- 2014 2017 2020: FIA Cross Country Rally World Cup; Africa Eco Race; FIA World Cup for Cross-Country Bajas

Vladimir Vasilyev (Russian: Владимир Васильев; born 11 August 1969) is a Russian rally raid driver in the car category. He won the FIA World Cup for Cross-Country Rallies in 2014 and the FIA World Cup for Cross-Country Bajas in 2020. He also won the 2017 Africa Eco Race.
