= Orlando Terranova =

Argentine rally driver

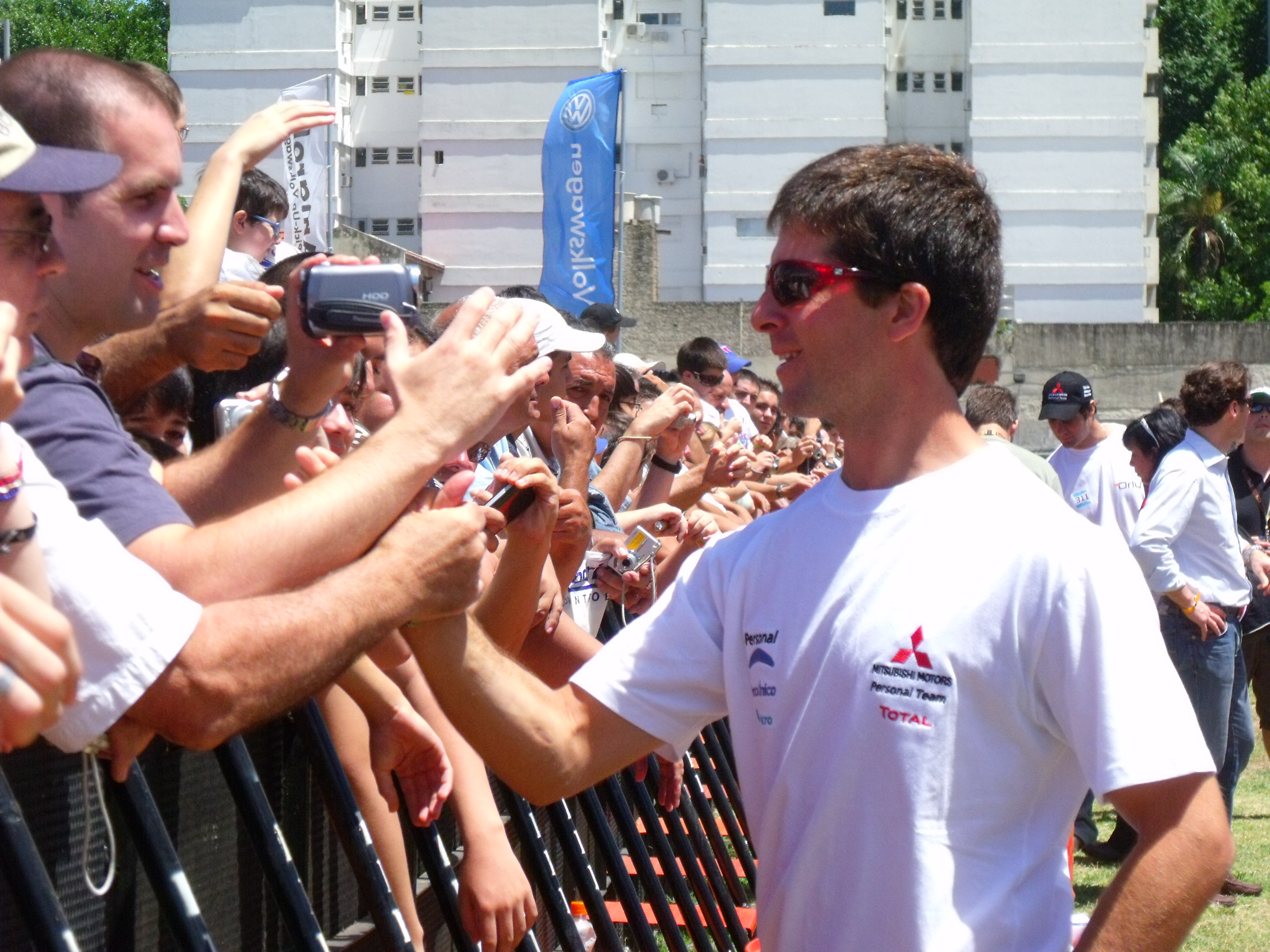
Terranova at the 2010 Dakar Rally

Orlando Terranova (born 10 November 1979 in Mendoza) is an Argentine rally driver, best known for his participation in the Dakar Rally.

== Biography ==
Terranova began his professional career in 1997 as an enduro rider, taking four national titles and placing third in the Latin America enduro championship in 2001. Two years later, he won the Chilean Rally del Desierto and the production car category of the Argentina-based Por las Pampas Rally, as well as taking silver in the International Six Days Enduro for a second time after his success in 2001.

Terranova retired from his first two attempts at the Dakar Rally in 2005 and 2007, both times aboard a KTM, and when the event resumed in 2009 in South America following the cancellation of the 2008 event, he opted to switch to four wheels. Piloting an X-raid prepared BMW X3 alongside co-driver Alain Guehennec, Terranova once again failed to finish, although he did win that year's Tunisian Rally. He completed the Dakar for the first time the following year, this time alongside Pascal Maimon, finishing ninth overall in a Mitsubishi Racing Lancer.

Returning to X-Raid in 2011, Terranova rolled his X3 out of the rally on the seventh stage, and once again failed to finish in 2012 while competing in a Toyota when his co-driver Andy Grider quit the rally on the fourth day following an argument with Terranova. The same year, he took victory in the Dakar Series-sanctioned Desafio Litoral event, as well as the Desafio Ruta 40, with his new co-driver Paulo Fiuza.

Back in an X-Raid BMW in 2013, Terranova finished the Dakar for the second time, winning the tenth stage en route to fifth place overall, also winning that year's Moroccan Rally. In 2014, he once more finished fifth driving a Mini, albeit with no stage wins.

== Dakar Rally results ==
Year	Class	Vehicle	Position	Stages won
2005	Bike	(Austria) KTM	DNF	0
2006	Did not enter			
2007	Bike	(Austria) KTM	DNF	0
2008	Event cancelled – replaced by the 2008 Central Europe Rally			
2009	Car	(Germany) BMW	DNF	0
2010	Car	(Japan) Mitsubishi	9th	0
2011	Car	(Germany) BMW	DNF	0
2012	Car	(Japan) Toyota	DNF	0
2013	Car	(Germany) BMW	5th	1
2014	Car	(United Kingdom) Mini	5th	0
2015	Car	(United Kingdom) Mini	18th	4
2016	Car	(United Kingdom) Mini	12th	0
2017	Car	(United Kingdom) Mini	6th	0
2018	Car	(United Kingdom) Mini	20th	0
2019	Car	(United Kingdom) Mini	DNF	0
2020	Car	(United Kingdom) Mini	6th	0
2021	Car	(United Kingdom) Mini	DNF	0
2022	Car	(United Kingdom) BRX	4th	1
2023	Car	(United Kingdom) BRX	DNF	0
