= 2026 FIM Bajas World Cup =

Motorsport season

2026 FIM Bajas World Cup
Previous:	2025	Next:	2027

The 2026 FIM Bajas World Cup season was the 15th season of the FIM Bajas World Cup, an international rally raid competition for motorbikes and quads.

The Baja TT Escuderia de Castelo Branco, originally scheduled to be the third round of the series, was postponed to be the last round due to severe weather conditions.

The Baja Aragon was postponed nearly two months from its original date due to the risk of wildfires in the region.

== Calendar ==
The calendar for the 2026 season was scheduled to have seven rounds, with some of the events also being part of 2025 FIA World Cup for Cross-Country Bajas.

Round	Dates	Rally name
1	29–31 January	(Saudi Arabia) Saudi Baja
2	12–14 February	Jordan Baja
3	19–20 June	(Spain) Baja TT Dehesa Extremadura
4	11–13 September	(Spain) Baja Aragon
5	28–31 October	Baja Qatar
6	5–8 November	(United Arab Emirates) Dubai International Baja
7	13–15 November	(Portugal) Escuderia de Castelo Branco

== Regulations ==
The following classes and categories are included:

- Category 1: Bike (Up to 450cc single or twin cylinder, 2T or 4T)
- Category 2: Quads (three-wheel vehicles are forbidden)
- Category 3: Trail (more than 600cc, twin cylinder or more and with the minimum weight of 165kg. The maximum speed for this category is 130 km/h.)
- Class 1: Women
- Class 2: Junior
- Class 3: Veterans

All the other categories i.e. “Over 450cc” do not count towards the FIM Bajas World Cups & Trophy.

== Teams and riders ==
Bajas World Cup
Constructor	Team	Rider	Rounds
(Italy) Fantic		(Qatar) Mohammed Al-Kubaisi	5
(Austria) Gas Gas		(Poland) Marcin Talaga	1–2, 5–6
(Austria) Gas Gas	RNS Racing	(United Kingdom) Jason Joslin	1, 5
(Austria) Gas Gas		(Jordan) Zaid Jaber	2
(Austria) Gas Gas	Team Dovland	(Norway) Hans Kristian Dovland	5
(Austria) Gas Gas		(Croatia) Jakov Jukić	5
(Japan) Honda	Honda RedMoto France/Elite Factory 15	(France) Hugo Blanjoue	4
(Austria) Husqvarna		(United Kingdom) Brett Hunt	1–2, 5–6
(Austria) Husqvarna		(United Arab Emirates) Hamdan Al-Ali	1, 6
(Austria) Husqvarna		(Netherlands) Luc Dumore	5
(Austria) Husqvarna		(Germany) Anton Tyll	5
(Austria) Husqvarna		(Qatar) Abdullatif Mojadam	5
(Japan) Kawasaki	MX Ride Dubai	(Kuwait) Abdullah Al-Shatti	1–2
(Japan) Kawasaki		(Portugal) Nélson Cunha	7
(China) Kove		(Australia) Martin Chalmers	1, 5
(China) Kove	MX Ride Dubai	(United Arab Emirates) Sultan Al-Balooshi	1–2
(China) Kove	Team Marčič	(Slovenia) Simon Marčič	5
(China) Kove		(Australia) Thomas Cross	5–6
(China) Kove		(Mexico) Christophe Suberville	5–6
(China) Kove		(Saudi Arabia) Ibrahim Aljarallah	5
(China) Kove		(India) Asad Khan	5–6
(China) Kove		(Saudi Arabia) Mohammed Al-Muaikil	6
(Austria) KTM		(United Kingdom) Thomas Childs	1–2, 5–6
(Austria) KTM	RNS racing	(Germany) Philip Horlemann	1–3, 5–6
(Austria) KTM	RNS Racing	(Germany) Tony Schattat	1–2, 5
(Austria) KTM	KTM Qatar/Alfardan Motorcycles	(Qatar) Michael Anderson	1, 5
(Austria) KTM	Hleem	(Saudi Arabia) Abdulhalim Al-Mogheera	All
(Austria) KTM		(Qatar) Mohammed Al-Kubaisi	1–3, 6–7
(Austria) KTM		(Croatia) Darko Marasovic	2
(Austria) KTM	XRaids Experience	(United Kingdom) Mark Harfield	4
(Austria) KTM		(France) Sylvain Salicru	4
(Austria) KTM		(France) Romain Dumontier	5–6
(Austria) KTM		(United Kingdom) Robbie Wallace	5
(Austria) KTM		(Slovenia) Toni Mulec	5–6
(Austria) KTM		(United Kingdom) Makis Rees-Stavros	5
(Austria) KTM	DUUST Rally Team	(Poland) Tomasz Orwat	5
(Austria) KTM		(Poland) Michał Janaszek	5–6
(Austria) KTM		(Lebanon) Louis Abou Nader	5
(Austria) KTM		(United States) Ismail Mansour	5
(Austria) KTM		(United Arab Emirates) Abdulla Lanjawi	6
(Austria) KTM		(Lithuania) Edvard Sokolovski	6
(Austria) KTM	MX Ride Dubai	(United Arab Emirates) Mattar Al-Kaabi	6
(France) Sherco	Sherco TVS Rally Factory	(Spain) Lorenzo Santolino	4
(France) Sherco	Sherco TVS Rally Factory	(India) Rajendra Revallar	4
(Japan) Yamaha	Markazia Yamaha Jordan	(Jordan) Abdullah Abu Aisheh	1–2, 5
(Japan) Yamaha		(Jordan) Tla'at Al-Shishane	2
(Japan) Yamaha		(India) Farooq Husain	6
Women's Bajas World Cup
Constructor	Team	Rider	Rounds
(Japan) Honda		(Ecuador) Maria Taranto	4
(Austria) Husqvarna	DUUST Rally Team	(Poland) Joanna Modrzewska	1
(United Kingdom) Triumph	DUUST Rally Team	(Poland) Joanna Modrzewska	2–7
(Austria) KTM	XRaids Experience	(India) Priyankka Dutta	4–5
(Japan) Yamaha	Motocross Center	(Spain) Sara García	3–4
Junior Bajas World Cup
Constructor	Team	Rider	Rounds
(Austria) Husqvarna		(Spain) Victor Moya	3, 7
(Japan) Honda		(Spain) David Braceras	4
(Austria) KTM	Motozone Racing	(United Kingdom) Alex McInnes	1–3, 5–6
(Austria) KTM	Moto Gardunha	(Portugal) António Feliciano	3, 7
(Austria) KTM	XRaids Experience	(Spain) Alfredo Pellicer	4
(Austria) KTM	DUUST Rally Team	(Poland) Konrad Dąbrowski	5–6
(Austria) KTM	MX Ride Dubai	(United Kingdom) Ethan Lane	3–5
(Japan) Yamaha	MX Ride Dubai	(United Kingdom) Ethan Lane	6
(Japan) Yamaha		(Jordan) Eyad Salmirza	2
(Japan) Yamaha	Bracot	(Portugal) Tómas Paulo	4
(Japan) Yamaha		(Portugal) Martim Pedroso	4
Veteran Bajas World Cup
Constructor	Team	Rider	Rounds
(Austria) Gas Gas	Władcy Dróg/25 SRV	(Poland) Tomasz Niedzwiedzki	1–2
(Japan) Honda	Władcy Dróg/25 SRV	(Poland) Tomasz Niedzwiedzki	3, 5–6
(Japan) Honda		(Ecuador) Maria Taranto	4
(Austria) Husqvarna	DUUST Rally Team	(Poland) Joanna Modrzewska	1
(Austria) Husqvarna	DUUST Rally Team	(Poland) Norbert Świętochowski	1, 5
(Austria) Husqvarna	DUUST Rally Team	(Poland) Sławomir Sypien	6
(China) Kove		(Australia) Thomas Blackburn	1
(China) Kove	Desert Storm	(India) Jatin Jain	1, 5–6
(China) Kove		(Portugal) Paulo Cardoso	3–4
(China) Kove		(Mexico) Ladislao Hernandez	5–6
(China) Kove		(India) Amit Jagtap	5
(Austria) KTM	MX Ride Dubai	(India) Amit Jagtap	4
(Austria) KTM	MX Ride Dubai	(United Arab Emirates) Mohammed Al-Balooshi	1–6
(Austria) KTM	MX Ride Dubai	(Lebanon) Rafic Eid	1–2, 5
(Austria) KTM	MX Ride Dubai	(United Arab Emirates) Sultan Al-Shanqiti	2, 6
(Austria) KTM		(United States) Patrick Emmert	1, 5
(Austria) KTM		(United Kingdom) Stefan Mieczkowski	1
(Austria) KTM		(Hungary) Richárd Hodola	3–4
(Austria) KTM		(Australia) Andrew Houlihan	5
(Austria) KTM	DUUST Rally Team	(Norway) Ola Fløene	5
(Austria) KTM		(United Kingdom) Andrew Hayes	5
(United Kingdom) Triumph	DUUST Rally Team	(Poland) Joanna Modrzewska	2–7
(Japan) Yamaha		(Spain) Toni Vingut	4
Trail Bajas World Cup
Constructor	Team	Rider	Rounds
(China) Kove		(Italy) Matteo Bottino	3–4
(China) Kove		(Spain) Julio López	4
Quad Bajas World Cup
Constructor	Team	Rider	Rounds
(China) CFMoto		(Saudi Arabia) Abdulrahman Al-Abdullatif	5
(China) CFMoto		(Saudi Arabia) Badr Al-Hamdan	5
(China) CFMoto		(Saudi Arabia) Ahmed Al-Jaber	3–4, 7
(Japan) Suzuki		(Italy) Matteo Lardori	5
(Japan) Yamaha		(Saudi Arabia) Ahmed Al-Jaber	1–2, 5–6
(Japan) Yamaha		(Saudi Arabia) Haitham Al-Tuwayjiri	1
(Japan) Yamaha		(Saudi Arabia) Abdulaziz Al-Atawi	All
(Japan) Yamaha		(Saudi Arabia) Hani Al-Noumesi	All
(Japan) Yamaha	Knull Racing	(Portugal) Jorge Sampaio	3–4, 7
(Japan) Yamaha	Bracot	(Portugal) Tómas Paulo	4
(Japan) Yamaha		(France) Antoine Sanchez	4
(Japan) Yamaha	Wojtasik Motosport	(Poland) Marcin Wilkołek	4, 7
(Japan) Yamaha		(Portugal) Martim Pedroso	4
(Japan) Yamaha		(Spain) Daniel Vilá	4
(Japan) Yamaha		(Spain) Toni Vingut	4
(Japan) Yamaha		(United Arab Emirates) Abdulaziz Ahli	5–6
(Japan) Yamaha		(United Arab Emirates) Khalifa Al-Bastaki	5–6
(Japan) Yamaha		(United Arab Emirates) Ali Al-Marzouqi	6

== Results ==
=== Motorbikes ===
Round	Rally name	Podium finishers			
Round	Rally name	Rank	Rider	Bike	Time
1	(Saudi Arabia) Saudi Baja	1	(United Kingdom) Alex McInnes	KTM 450 RFr	04:55:17
1	(Saudi Arabia) Saudi Baja	2	(United Arab Emirates) Mohammed Al-Balooshi	KTM 450 RR	05:29:41
1	(Saudi Arabia) Saudi Baja	3	(United Arab Emirates) Sultan Al-Balooshi	Kove Rally EX	05:30:08
2	Jordan Baja	1	(United Kingdom) Alex McInnes	KTM 450 EXC	06:54:17
2	Jordan Baja	2	(Saudi Arabia) Abdulhalim Al-Mogheera	KTM 450	07:00:43
2	Jordan Baja	3	(Kuwait) Abdullah Al-Shatti	KTM 450 Rally	07:17:36
3	(Spain) Baja TT Dehesa Extremadura	1	(United Kingdom) Ethan Lane	KTM 450 EXC-F	07:46:49
3	(Spain) Baja TT Dehesa Extremadura	2	(Spain) Sara García	Yamaha WR450F	07:49:20
3	(Spain) Baja TT Dehesa Extremadura	3	(Portugal) Paulo Cardoso	Kove 450 Rally	07:52:59
4	(Spain) Baja Aragon	1	(Spain) Lorenzo Santolino	Sherco 450 Rallye	06:57:27
4	(Spain) Baja Aragon	2	(Spain) Alfredo Pellicer	KTM 450 Rally	07:08:56
4	(Spain) Baja Aragon	3	(France) Hugo Blanjoue	Honda CRF 450RX	07:21:33
5	Baja Qatar	1	(Poland) Konrad Dąbrowski	KTM 450 Rally Factory Replica	06:22:05
5	Baja Qatar	2	(United Kingdom) Alex McInnes	KTM 450 RFR	06:25:17
5	Baja Qatar	3	(France) Romain Dumontier	KTM 450 Rally Factory	06:32:37
6	(United Arab Emirates) Dubai International Baja	1	(United Kingdom) Alex McInnes	KTM 450 RFR	05:21:29
6	(United Arab Emirates) Dubai International Baja	2	(United Kingdom) Ethan Lane	Yamaha YZF 450	05:28:05
6	(United Arab Emirates) Dubai International Baja	3	(Slovenia) Toni Mulec	KTM 450 Rally	05:35:47
7	(Portugal) Escuderia de Castelo Branco	1	(Portugal) António Feliciano	KTM 250 EXC-F	06:46:20
7	(Portugal) Escuderia de Castelo Branco	2	(Saudi Arabia) Abdulhalim Al-Mogheera	Husqvarna FE 450	06:58:58
7	(Portugal) Escuderia de Castelo Branco	3	(Poland) Joanna Modrzewska	Triumph TF 450-E	07:17:58

=== Quads ===
Round	Rally name	Podium finishers			
Round	Rally name	Rank	Rider	Bike	Time
1	(Saudi Arabia) Saudi Baja	1	(Saudi Arabia) Hani Al-Noumesi	Yamaha Raptor 700R	06:34:05
1	(Saudi Arabia) Saudi Baja	2	(Saudi Arabia) Abdulaziz Al-Atawi	Yamaha Raptor	06:47:53
1	(Saudi Arabia) Saudi Baja	3	(Saudi Arabia) Ahmed Al-Jaber	Yamaha Raptor 700R	08:21:52
2	Jordan Baja	1	(Saudi Arabia) Hani Al-Noumesi	Yamaha YFM 700R	07:58:05
2	Jordan Baja	2	(Saudi Arabia) Ahmed Al-Jaber	Yamaha 700R	08:09:53
2	Jordan Baja	3	(Saudi Arabia) Abdulaziz Al-Atawi	Yamaha Raptor 700R	08:19:21
3	(Spain) Baja TT Dehesa Extremadura	1	(Portugal) Jorge Sampaio	Yamaha YFZ 450R	08:23:31
3	(Spain) Baja TT Dehesa Extremadura	2	(Saudi Arabia) Ahmed Al-Jaber	CFMoto CForce	09:08:20
4	(Spain) Baja Aragon	1	(Portugal) Tómas Paulo	Yamaha YFZ 450R	07:24:56
4	(Spain) Baja Aragon	2	(France) Antoine Sanchez	Yamaha Raptor 700	07:42:23
4	(Spain) Baja Aragon	3	(Poland) Marcin Wilkołek	Yamaha Raptor 700	07:47:27
5	Baja Qatar	1	(United Arab Emirates) Khalifa Al-Bastaki	Yamaha YFZ450R	07:52:06
5	Baja Qatar	2	(United Arab Emirates) Abdulaziz Ahli	Yamaha Raptor 700	08:36:53
5	Baja Qatar	3	(Saudi Arabia) Hani Al-Noumesi	Yamaha 700	09:10:47
6	(United Arab Emirates) Dubai International Baja	1	(United Arab Emirates) Khalifa Al-Bastaki	Yamaha Raptor 700	07:09:54
6	(United Arab Emirates) Dubai International Baja	2	(United Arab Emirates) Ali Al-Marzouqi	Yamaha YFZ450R	07:51:35
6	(United Arab Emirates) Dubai International Baja	3	(Saudi Arabia) Hani Al-Noumesi	Yamaha Raptor 700	07:52:50
7	(Portugal) Escuderia de Castelo Branco	1	(Poland) Marcin Wilkołek	Yamaha Raptor 700	06:25:52
7	(Portugal) Escuderia de Castelo Branco	2	(Portugal) Jorge Sampaio	Yamaha YFZ 450R	06:36:18
7	(Portugal) Escuderia de Castelo Branco	3	(Saudi Arabia) Ahmed Al-Jaber	CFMoto CForce	07:12:45

== Championship standings ==
=== Riders' championship ===
- Points for final positions are awarded as follows:

Position	1st	2nd	3rd	4th	5th	6th	7th	8th	9th	10th	11th	12th	13th	14th	15th+
Points	25	20	16	13	11	10	9	8	7	6	5	4	3	2	1

A rider's best six results will count towards their final position in the final standings.

==== Motorbikes ====
Pos	Rider	Manufacturer	SAU (Saudi Arabia)	JOR (Jordan)	EXT (Spain)	ARA (Spain)	QAT (Qatar)	DUB (United Arab Emirates)	ESC (Portugal)	Points	Best Score
1	(United Kingdom) Alex McInnes	KTM	1	1	8		2	1		103	
2	(Saudi Arabia) Abdulhalim Al-Mogheera	KTM	4	2	4	6	12	18	2	81	80
3	(United Kingdom) Ethan Lane	KTM			1	4	4			71	
3	(United Kingdom) Ethan Lane	Yamaha						2		71	
4	(United Arab Emirates) Mohammed Al-Balooshi	KTM	2	4	5	10	10	Ret		56	
5	(Poland) Konrad Dąbrowski	KTM					1	4		38	
6	(Poland) Joanna Modrzewska	Husqvarna	18							32	32
6	(Poland) Joanna Modrzewska	Triumph		12	10	12	20	Ret	3	32	32
7	(Spain) Sara García	Yamaha			2	5				31	
8	(Qatar) Mohammed Al-Kubaisi	KTM	15	11	9		15	13	5	28	
9	(Germany) Philip Horlemann	KTM	12	7	Ret		9	10		28	
10	(Slovenia) Toni Mulec	KTM					5	3		27	
11	(France) Romain Dumontier	KTM					3	5		27	
12	(Kuwait) Abdullah Al-Shatti	Kawasaki	6	3						26	
13	(Portugal) António Feliciano	KTM			Ret				1	25	
14	(Spain) Lorenzo Santolino	Sherco				1				25	
15	(Portugal) Paulo Cardoso	Kove			3	7				25	
16	(Poland) Marcin Talaga	Gas Gas	5	10			Ret	8		25	
17	(Spain) Victor Moya	Husqvarna			6				4	23	
18	(Spain) Alfredo Pellicer	KTM				2				20	
19	(Lebanon) Rafic Eid	KTM	9	6			Ret			17	
20	(Jordan) Abdullah Abu Aisheh	Yamaha	8	8			19			17	
21	(France) Hugo Blanjoue	Honda				3				16	
22	(United Arab Emirates) Sultan Al-Balooshi	Kove	3	Ret						16	
23	(Poland) Tomasz Niedzwiedzki	Gas Gas	14	14						16	
23	(Poland) Tomasz Niedzwiedzki	Honda			7		14	16		16	
24	(United Kingdom) Brett Hunt	Husqvarna	11	13			28	12		13	
25	(Jordan) Zaid Jaber	Gas Gas		5						11	
26	(Qatar) Michael Anderson	KTM	21				6			11	
27	(United Arab Emirates) Abdulla Lanjawi	KTM						6		10	
28	(United Arab Emirates) Hamdan Al-Ali	Husqvarna	13					9		10	
29	(Lithuania) Edvard Sokolovski	KTM						7		9	
30	(United Kingdom) Thomas Childs	KTM	17	9			18	Ret		9	
31	(United Kingdom) Robbie Wallace	KTM					7			9	
32	(Australia) Thomas Blackburn	Kove	7							9	
33	(Norway) Hans Kristian Dovland	Gas Gas					8			8	
34	(Hungary) Richárd Hodola	KTM			Ret	8				8	
35	(India) Rajendra Revallar	Sherco				9				7	
36	(Australia) Martin Chalmers	Kove	10				Ret			6	
37	(India) Amit Jagtap	KTM				11	27			6	
38	(Poland) Sławomir Sypien	Husqvarna						11		5	
39	(Poland) Tomasz Orwat	KTM					11			5	
40	(Netherlands) Luc Dumore	Husqvarna					13			3	
41	(United Kingdom) Mark Harfield	KTM				13				3	
42	(Mexico) Christophe Suberville	Kove					21	14		3	
43	(Germany) Tony Schattat	KTM	19	15			22			3	
44	(India) Priyankka Dutta	KTM				14	Ret			2	
45	(United Kingdom) Jason Joslin	Gas Gas	16				26			2	
46	(Poland) Michał Janaszek	KTM					17	19		2	
47	(India) Jatin Jain	Kove	Ret							2	
47	(India) Jatin Jain	KTM					23	17		2	
48	(United Arab Emirates) Mattar Al-Kaabi	KTM						15		1	
49	(Ecuador) Maria Taranto	Honda				15				1	
50	(Norway) Ola Fløene	KTM					16			1	
51	(Jordan) Eyad Salmirza	Yamaha		16						1	
52	(India) Farooq Husain	Yamaha						20		1	
53	(United Kingdom) Stefan Mieczkowski	KTM	20							1	
54	(Mexico) Ladislao Hernandez	Kove					Ret	21		1	
55	(United Arab Emirates) Sultan Al-Shanqiti	KTM		Ret				22		1	
56	(Saudi Arabia) Ibrahim Aljarallah	Kove					24			1	
57	(Germany) Anton Tyll	Husqvarna					25			1	
58	(India) Asad Khan	Kove					29	Ret		1	
59	(United Kingdom) Makis Rees-Stavros	KTM					30			1	
	(Australia) Thomas Cross	Kove					Ret	Ret		0	
	(Poland) Norbert Świętochowski	Husqvarna	Ret				Ret			0	
	(United States) Patrick Emmert	KTM	Ret				Ret			0	
	(Portugal) Nélson Cunha	Kawasaki							Ret	0	
	(Saudi Arabia) Mohammed Al-Muaikil	Kove						Ret		0	
	(Slovenia) Simon Marčič	Kove					Ret			0	
	(Australia) Andrew Houlihan	KTM					Ret			0	
	(Croatia) Jakov Jukić	Gas Gas					Ret			0	
	(Lebanon) Louis Abou Nader	KTM					Ret			0	
	(United States) Ismail Mansour	KTM					Ret			0	
	(United Kingdom) Andrew Hayes	KTM					Ret			0	
	(Qatar) Abdullatif Mojadam	Husqvarna					Ret			0	
	(Spain) David Braceras	Honda				Ret				0	
	(France) Sylvain Salicru	KTM				Ret				0	
	(Croatia) Darko Marasovic	KTM		Ret						0	
	(Jordan) Tla'at Al-Shishane	Yamaha		Ret						0	
Pos	Rider	Manufacturer	SAU (Saudi Arabia)	JOR (Jordan)	EXT (Spain)	ARA (Spain)	QAT (Qatar)	DUB (United Arab Emirates)	ESC (Portugal)	Points	Best Score

==== Quads ====
Pos	Rider	Manufacturer	SAU (Saudi Arabia)	JOR (Jordan)	EXT (Spain)	ARA (Spain)	QAT (Qatar)	DUB (United Arab Emirates)	ESC (Portugal)	Points	Best Score
1	(Saudi Arabia) Hani Al-Noumesi	Yamaha	1	1	Ret	6	3	3	4	105	105
2	(Saudi Arabia) Ahmed Al-Jaber	Yamaha	3	2			Ret	4		96	96
2	(Saudi Arabia) Ahmed Al-Jaber	CFMoto			2	5			3	96	96
3	(Saudi Arabia) Abdulaziz Al-Atawi	Yamaha	2	3	Ret	Ret	4	5	5	71	71
4	(Portugal) Jorge Sampaio	Yamaha			1	4			2	58	
5	(United Arab Emirates) Khalifa Al-Bastaki	Yamaha					1	1		50	
6	(Poland) Marcin Wilkołek	Yamaha				3			1	41	
7	(Portugal) Tomás Paulo	Yamaha				1				25	
8	(United Arab Emirates) Ali Al-Marzouqi	Yamaha						2		20	
9	(United Arab Emirates) Abdulaziz Ahli	Yamaha					2	Ret		20	
10	(France) Antoine Sanchez	Yamaha				2				20	
11	(Portugal) Martim Pedroso	Yamaha				7				9	
	(Saudi Arabia) Badr Al-Hamdan	CFMoto					Ret			0	
	(Italy) Matteo Lardori	Suzuki					Ret			0	
	(Saudi Arabia) Abdulrahman Al-Abdullatif	CFMoto					Ret			0	
	(Spain) Daniel Vilá	Yamaha				Ret				0	
	(Spain) Toni Vingut	Yamaha				Ret				0	
	(Saudi Arabia) Haitham Al-Tuwayjiri	Yamaha	Ret							0	
Pos	Rider	Manufacturer	SAU (Saudi Arabia)	JOR (Jordan)	EXT (Spain)	ARA (Spain)	QAT (Qatar)	DUB (United Arab Emirates)	ESC (Portugal)	Points	Best Score

==== Women ====
Pos	Rider	Manufacturer	SAU (Saudi Arabia)	JOR (Jordan)	EXT (Spain)	ARA (Spain)	QAT (Qatar)	DUB (United Arab Emirates)	ESC (Portugal)	Points	Best Score
1	(Poland) Joanna Modrzewska	Husqvarna	1							140	140
1	(Poland) Joanna Modrzewska	Triumph		1	2	2	1	Ret	1	140	140
2	(Spain) Sara García	Yamaha			1	1				50	
3	(India) Priyankka Dutta	KTM				3	Ret			16	
4	(Ecuador) Maria Taranto	Honda				4				13	
Pos	Rider	Manufacturer	SAU (Saudi Arabia)	JOR (Jordan)	EXT (Spain)	ARA (Spain)	QAT (Qatar)	DUB (United Arab Emirates)	ESC (Portugal)	Points	Best Score

==== Junior ====
Pos	Rider	Manufacturer	SAU (Saudi Arabia)	JOR (Jordan)	EXT (Spain)	ARA (Spain)	QAT (Qatar)	DUB (United Arab Emirates)	ESC (Portugal)	Points	Best Score
1	(United Kingdom) Alex McInnes	KTM	1	1	3		2	1		111	
2	(United Kingdom) Ethan Lane	KTM			1	3	3			77	
2	(United Kingdom) Ethan Lane	Yamaha						2		77	
3	(Poland) Konrad Dąbrowski	KTM					1	3		41	
4	(Spain) Victor Moya	Husqvarna			2				2	40	
5	(Portugal) António Feliciano	KTM			Ret				1	25	
6	(Spain) Alfredo Pellicer	KTM				1				25	
7	(Portugal) Tomás Paulo	Yamaha				2				20	
8	(Jordan) Eyad Salmirza	Yamaha		2						20	
9	(Portugal) Martim Pedroso	Yamaha				4				13	
	(Spain) David Braceras	Honda				Ret				0	
Pos	Rider	Manufacturer	SAU (Saudi Arabia)	JOR (Jordan)	EXT (Spain)	ARA (Spain)	QAT (Qatar)	DUB (United Arab Emirates)	ESC (Portugal)	Points	Best Score

==== Veteran ====
Pos	Rider	Manufacturer	SAU (Saudi Arabia)	JOR (Jordan)	EXT (Spain)	ARA (Spain)	QAT (Qatar)	DUB (United Arab Emirates)	ESC (Portugal)	Points	Best Score
1	(United Arab Emirates) Mohammed Al-Balooshi	KTM	1	1	2	3	1	Ret		111	
2	(Poland) Joanna Modrzewska	Husqvarna	5							89	89
2	(Poland) Joanna Modrzewska	Triumph		3	4	5	4	Ret	1	89	89
3	(Poland) Tomasz Niedzwiedzki	Gas Gas	4	4						82	
3	(Poland) Tomasz Niedzwiedzki	Honda			3		2	2		82	
4	(Portugal) Paulo Cardoso	Kove			1	1				50	
5	(Lebanon) Rafic Eid	KTM	3	2			Ret			36	
6	(India) Jatin Jain	Kove	Ret							27	
6	(India) Jatin Jain	KTM					5	3		27	
7	(Poland) Sławomir Sypien	Husqvarna						1		25	
8	(India) Amit Jagtap	KTM				4	6			23	
9	(Hungary) Richárd Hodola	KTM			Ret	2				20	
10	(Australia) Thomas Blackburn	Kove	2							20	
11	(Norway) Ola Fløene	KTM					3			16	
12	(Mexico) Ladislao Hernandez	Kove					Ret	4		13	
13	(United Arab Emirates) Sultan Al-Shanqiti	KTM		Ret				5		11	
14	(Ecuador) Maria Taranto	Honda				6				10	
15	(United Kingdom) Stefan Mieczkowski	KTM	6							10	
	(Poland) Norbert Świętochowski	Husqvarna	Ret				Ret			0	
	(United States) Patrick Emmert	KTM	Ret				Ret			0	
	(Australia) Andrew Houlihan	KTM					Ret			0	
	(United Kingdom) Andrew Hayes	KTM					Ret			0	
	(Spain) Toni Vingut	Yamaha				Ret				0	
Pos	Rider	Manufacturer	SAU (Saudi Arabia)	JOR (Jordan)	EXT (Spain)	ARA (Spain)	QAT (Qatar)	DUB (United Arab Emirates)	ESC (Portugal)	Points	Best Score

==== Trail ====
Pos	Rider	Manufacturer	SAU (Saudi Arabia)	JOR (Jordan)	EXT (Spain)	ARA (Spain)	QAT (Qatar)	DUB (United Arab Emirates)	ESC (Portugal)	Points	Best Score
1	(Italy) Matteo Bottino	Kove			1	1				50	
2	(Spain) Julio López	Kove				2				20	
Pos	Rider	Manufacturer	SAU (Saudi Arabia)	JOR (Jordan)	EXT (Spain)	ARA (Spain)	QAT (Qatar)	DUB (United Arab Emirates)	ESC (Portugal)	Points	Best Score
