= 2022 FIM Bajas World Cup =

2022 FIM Bajas World Cup
Previous:	2021	Next:	2023

The 2022 FIM Bajas World Cup season is the 11th season of the FIM Bajas World Cup, an international rally raid competition for motorbikes, quads and SSVs.

== Calendar ==
The calendar for the 2022 season originally had ten baja-style events scheduled, with some of the events also being part of 2022 FIA World Cup for Cross-Country Bajas. The Atacama Baja doubleheader was later removed from the schedule.

Round	Dates	Rally name
1	17–19 February	Jordan Baja
2	24–26 March	Qatar International Baja
3	6–8 May	(Portugal) Baja do Oeste
4	22–23 July	(Spain) Baja Aragón
5	4–7 August	(Hungary) Hungarian Baja
6	27–29 October	(Portugal) Baja Portalegre
7	10–12 November	(Saudi Arabia) Saudi Baja
8	1–3 December	(United Arab Emirates) Dubai International Baja

== Regulations ==
The following classes and categories are included:

- Category 1: Bike (Up to 450cc single or twin cylinder, 2T or 4T)
- Category 2: Quads (three-wheel vehicles are forbidden)
- Category 3: SSV
- Class 1: Women
- Class 2: Junior
- Class 3: Veterans

The FIM will award the World Cup to both riders and manufacturers of the bike category; also to riders only in the quad, and SSV (driver and co-driver) categories, as well as to riders only in the woman, and junior classes. A Trophy is awarded to the winners of the veterans category. Any other category, i.e. “Over 450cc” do not count for any of the FIM Baja World Cups.

== Teams and riders ==
Bajas World Cup
Constructor	Team	Rider	Rounds
(Italy) Beta		(Qatar) Abdulrahman Al-Sheeb	1
(Italy) Beta	Egyptian Team	(Egypt) Mahmoud El Hashash	7
(Austria) Gas Gas	Alentejo Offroad School	(Portugal) Micael Simão	3, 6
(Austria) Gas Gas	Aspar Team Gas Gas	(Spain) Tosha Schareina	4
(Japan) Honda		(Jordan) Rakan Al-Batayneh	1
(Japan) Honda	Team Bianchi Prata Honda	(Portugal) Fábio Magalhães	3, 6, 8
(Japan) Honda		(Australia) Martin Chalmers	7
(Japan) Honda		(Portugal) João Gomes	8
(Austria) Husqvarna		(Israel) Stav Clumeck	1
(Austria) Husqvarna	MX Ride Dubai	(United Arab Emirates) Mohammed Al Balooshi	2, 7
(Austria) Husqvarna	MX Ride Dubai	(Slovenia) Simon Marčič	8
(Austria) Husqvarna	MX Ride Dubai	(Poland) Jacek Bartoszek	8
(Austria) Husqvarna	Duust Rally Team	(Denmark) Thomas Kongshøj	2
(Austria) Husqvarna	Duust Rally Team	(India) Abdul Wahid Tanveer	8
(Austria) Husqvarna		(Bahrain) Salman Farhan	2, 6–7
(Austria) Husqvarna		(Czech Republic) Jan Brabec	4–5
(Austria) Husqvarna	Team Casteu	(France) Adrien Choblet	4
(Austria) Husqvarna		(Slovenia) Toni Mulec	5
(Austria) Husqvarna	Saudi Dirtbike Center	(Saudi Arabia) Mishal Alghuneim	7
(Austria) Husqvarna		(United Kingdom) Brett Hunt	7–8
(Austria) KTM	MX Ride Dubai	(United Arab Emirates) Mohammed Al Balooshi	1, 8
(Austria) KTM	MX Ride Dubai	(Kuwait) Abdullah Al-Shatti	1–2, 7–8
(Austria) KTM	MX Ride Dubai	(Lithuania) Modestas Siliunas	8
(Austria) KTM	MX Ride Dubai	(United Arab Emirates) Marwan Alrahmani	8
(Austria) KTM	KTM Amman Darwazeh Motors	(Jordan) Abdullah Abu Aisheh	1–2, 7–8
(Austria) KTM	Halim Team	(Saudi Arabia) Abdulhalim Al-Mogeera	1–2, 7
(Austria) KTM	Champ Factory	(Israel) Ziv Karmi	1
(Austria) KTM		(United Arab Emirates) Ahmed Al-Jaber	1–2, 7
(Austria) KTM	NBA Qatar	(South Africa) Michael Anderson	2
(Austria) KTM		(United Kingdom) Makis Rees-Stavros	2, 7, 8
(Austria) KTM		(United Kingdom) Michael Stokes	2
(Austria) KTM		(Hungary) Richárd Hodola	4–5
(Austria) KTM		(Saudi Arabia) Anass Al-Reheyani	7
(Austria) KTM		(Portugal) Daniel Jordão	8
(Austria) KTM	Vendetta Racing UAE	(Republic of Ireland) Oran O'Kelly	8
(France) Sherco	Team Sherco TVS Rally Factory	(Portugal) Rui Gonçalves	4
(France) Sherco	Team Sherco TVS Rally Factory	(Spain) Lorenzo Santolino	4
(France) Sherco	Team Sherco TVS Rally Factory	(India) Harith Noah	4
(Japan) Yamaha		(Australia) Martin Chalmers	1
(Japan) Yamaha		(Saudi Arabia) Bader Abalkhail	7
(Japan) Yamaha		(Saudi Arabia) Ehab Al Hakeem	7
Women's Bajas World Cup
Constructor	Team	Rider	Rounds
(Austria) Gas Gas		(Israel) Alona Ben-Natan	1, 8
(Austria) Husqvarna		(Israel) Yael Kadshai	1
(Austria) Husqvarna		(Poland) Joanna Modrzewska	2–3, 5, 8
(Austria) Husqvarna	Duust Rally Team	(Kuwait) Sarah Khuraibet	2
(Austria) Husqvarna	SRG Motorsports	(Netherlands) Mirjam Pol	3, 5, 8
(Austria) KTM		(Andorra) Margot Llobera	5, 7, 8
(Austria) KTM	Vendetta Racing UAE	(United Kingdom) Elisha Dessurne	8
(France) Sherco	Team Sherco TVS Rally Factory	(India) Aishwarya Pissay	4
(Japan) Yamaha		(Czech Republic) Kristyna Vankova	5
(Japan) Yamaha		(Czech Republic) Nelly Caisová	5–6
Junior Bajas World Cup
Constructor	Team	Rider	Rounds
(Italy) Beta	Egyptian Team	(Egypt) Hussein Hassan	7
(Austria) Husqvarna	Duust Rally Team	(Poland) Konrad Dąbrowski	2–4, 8
(Austria) Husqvarna	SRG Motorsport	(United Kingdom) Alex McInnes	2, 7, 8
(Austria) Husqvarna	SRG Motorsport	(Austria) Tobias Ebster	8
(Austria) KTM	KTM Amman Darwazeh Motors	(Jordan) Zaid Jaber	1
(Austria) KTM	TCC Plant	(United Kingdom) Robert Wallace	2, 5
(Austria) KTM	Caïman & Co	(France) Neels Theric	4
(Japan) Yamaha	Team Giroud - SMX Racing	(France) Kévin Giroud	4–5
(Japan) Yamaha		(Czech Republic) Kristyna Vankova	5
(Japan) Yamaha		(Czech Republic) Nelly Caisová	5–6
Veteran Bajas World Cup
Constructor	Team	Rider	Rounds
(Japan) Honda		(Qatar) Mohammed Al-Thani	1
(Japan) Honda	Moto450	(United Arab Emirates) Othman Alghfeli	2, 7
(Japan) Honda	Team Bianchi Prata Honda	(Portugal) Pedro Bianchi Prata	3, 6, 8
(Japan) Honda	Team Bianchi Prata Honda	(Portugal) Rui Ferreira	3, 6, 8
(Japan) Honda	Team Bianchi Prata Honda	(Portugal) Rafael Marques	3, 6
(Austria) Husqvarna		(Israel) Dudai Barak	1
(Austria) Husqvarna		(Israel) Shai Shapira	1
(Austria) Husqvarna		(Israel) Nir Clumeck	1
(Austria) Husqvarna	Team Casteu	(France) Fabrice Lardon	4
(Austria) Husqvarna	Vendetta Racing UAE	(United Kingdom) David McBride	8
(Austria) KTM		(Israel) Gad Nachmani	1
(Austria) KTM		(United Kingdom) Kurt Burroughs	2–3, 5, 8
(Austria) KTM		(United Kingdom) Barry Howe	2–5, 8
(Austria) KTM	Team Casteu	(France) Stephane Grignac	4
(Austria) KTM	Team Casteu	(France) Rodolphe Argoud	4
(Austria) KTM	Club Aventura Touareg	(Sweden) Martin Klyver	4
(Austria) KTM		(Netherlands) Gerard Lubbinge	7–8
(Austria) KTM	Vendetta Racing UAE	(United Kingdom) David Mabbs	8
(Japan) Yamaha		(Saudi Arabia) Saif Al-Zyoud	1
(Japan) Yamaha	Visit Sant Antoni - Ibiza	(Spain) Toni Vingut	4
(Japan) Yamaha	Fundación de A+	(Argentina) Gaston Pando	4
Quad Bajas World Cup
Constructor	Team	Rider	Rounds
(Canada) Can-Am		(Belgium) Emiel Stuckens	2
(Japan) Yamaha	Saudi Bikers	(Saudi Arabia) Haitham Al-Tuwayjiri	1, 7
(Japan) Yamaha		(Saudi Arabia) Hani Al-Noumesi	All
(Japan) Yamaha		(Saudi Arabia) Faisal Al-Suwayh	1–2, 8
(Japan) Yamaha		(Saudi Arabia) Abdalmajeed Al-Khulaifi	1–2, 4, 7–8
(Japan) Yamaha		(Saudi Arabia) Saif Al-Zyoud	1
(Japan) Yamaha		(Spain) Teófilo Viñaras	3
(Japan) Yamaha	SMX Racing	(France) Jerome Connart	4
(Japan) Yamaha	Joyride Race Service	(Spain) Dani Vila	4
(Japan) Yamaha	Team Giroud - SMX Racing	(France) Kévin Giroud	4–5
(Japan) Yamaha	Visit Sant Antoni - Ibiza	(Spain) Toni Vingut	4
(Japan) Yamaha	Varga Motorsport	(Slovakia) Juraj Varga	4–5
(Japan) Yamaha	Yamaha - SMX Racing Dragons	(France) Alexandre Giroud	4
(Japan) Yamaha	ACMS - SMX Racing	(France) Jeremy Jacomelli	4
(Japan) Yamaha	Fundación de A+	(Argentina) Gaston Pando	4
(Japan) Yamaha		(Czech Republic) Kristyna Vankova	5
(Japan) Yamaha		(Czech Republic) Nelly Caisová	5–6
(Japan) Yamaha		(United Arab Emirates) Abdulaziz Ahli	7–8
SSV Bajas World Cup
Constructor	Team	Rider	Rounds
(Canada) Can-Am		(Israel) Tal Galimidi (Israel) David Galimidi	1
(Canada) Can-Am		(Israel) Roy Bartov (Israel) Guy Biton	1
(Canada) Can-Am	JB Racing	(Italy) Davide Catania (Portugal) Carlos Paulino	6
(Japan) Yamaha	Sadah Team	(Qatar) Abdulla Al-Khelaifi (Qatar) Abdulaziz Al-Jabri	2
(Japan) Yamaha		(Italy) Alessandro Tinaburri (Italy) Emiliano Tinaburri	6
(Japan) Yamaha		(Italy) Gabriele Piccini (Italy) Mauro Gentilotti	6
(Japan) Yamaha		(Italy) Severino Gallini	6

== Results ==
=== Motorbikes ===
Round	Rally name	Podium finishers			
Round	Rally name	Rank	Rider	Bike	Time
1	Jordan Baja	1	(United Arab Emirates) Mohammed Al Balooshi	KTM 450	8:42:37
1	Jordan Baja	2	(Jordan) Abdullah Abu Aisheh	KTM Rally Factory	8:43:53
1	Jordan Baja	3	(Kuwait) Abdullah Al-Shatti	KTM 450 Rally	8:49:20
2	Qatar International Baja	1	(Poland) Konrad Dąbrowski	Husqvarna FR450 Rally Replica	6:41:53
2	Qatar International Baja	2	(United Arab Emirates) Mohammed Al Balooshi	Husqvarna Rally Replica	6:52:47
2	Qatar International Baja	3	(United Kingdom) Makis Rees-Stavros	KTM EXCF450	7:08:08
3	(Portugal) Baja do Oeste	1	(Portugal) Micael Simão	Gas Gas	5:58:47
3	(Portugal) Baja do Oeste	2	(Portugal) Fábio Magalhães	Honda	6:01:56
3	(Portugal) Baja do Oeste	3	(Poland) Konrad Dąbrowski	Husqvarna FR450 Rally Replica	6:25:57
4	(Spain) Baja Aragon	1	(Spain) Tosha Schareina	KTM Rally Replica	7:43:01
4	(Spain) Baja Aragon	2	(Spain) Lorenzo Santolino	Sherco Rally Factory	7:48:02
4	(Spain) Baja Aragon	3	(Portugal) Rui Gonçalves	Sherco Rally Factory	7:58:26
5	(Hungary) Hungarian Baja	1	(Slovenia) Toni Mulec	Husqvarna 450 FE	5:48:53
5	(Hungary) Hungarian Baja	2	(United Kingdom) Robert Wallace	KTM 450 EXC	6:02:18
5	(Hungary) Hungarian Baja	3	(Netherlands) Mirjam Pol	Husqvarna 450 FE	6:22:12
6	(Portugal) Baja Portalegre	1	(Portugal) Fábio Magalhães	Honda CRF 450RX	5:50:30
6	(Portugal) Baja Portalegre	2	(Portugal) Pedro Bianchi Prata	Honda CRF 450RX	6:15:00
6	(Portugal) Baja Portalegre	3	(Portugal) Rui Ferreira	Honda CRF 450RX	6:47:14
7	(Saudi Arabia) Saudi Baja	1	(United Arab Emirates) Mohammed Al Balooshi	Husqvarna	5:41:14
7	(Saudi Arabia) Saudi Baja	2	(Kuwait) Abdullah Al-Shatti	KTM KC	5:45:38
7	(Saudi Arabia) Saudi Baja	3	(Saudi Arabia) Mishal Alghuneim	Husqvarna 450 Rally	5:46:02
8	(United Arab Emirates) Dubai International Baja	1	(Poland) Konrad Dąbrowski	KTM 450	7:59:29
8	(United Arab Emirates) Dubai International Baja	2	(United Kingdom) Makis Rees-Stavros	KTM 450 Rally	8:09:03
8	(United Arab Emirates) Dubai International Baja	3	(Jordan) Abdullah Abu Aisheh	KTM 450 EXC	8:10:49

=== Quads ===
Round	Rally name	Podium finishers			
Round	Rally name	Rank	Rider	Bike	Time
1	Jordan Baja	1	(Saudi Arabia) Abdalmajeed Al-Khulaifi	Yamaha Raptor	10:16:35
1	Jordan Baja	2	(Saudi Arabia) Hani Al-Noumesi	Yamaha	25:10:11
1	Jordan Baja	3	(Saudi Arabia) Saif Al-Zyoud	Yamaha 450YF	37:31:00
2	Qatar International Baja	1	(Saudi Arabia) Abdalmajeed Al-Khulaifi	Yamaha Raptor	9:26:17
3	(Portugal) Baja do Oeste	1	(Spain) Teófilo Viñaras Gallart	Yamaha	7:54:04
3	(Portugal) Baja do Oeste	2	(Saudi Arabia) Hani Al-Noumesi	Yamaha	9:20:12
4	(Spain) Baja Aragon	1	(France) Alexandre Giroud	Yamaha Raptor	8:29:50
4	(Spain) Baja Aragon	2	(Spain) Dani Vila	Yamaha Raptor	8:39:37
4	(Spain) Baja Aragon	3	(France) Jeremy Jacomelli	Yamaha Raptor	9:25:06
5	(Hungary) Hungarian Baja	1	(Slovakia) Juraj Varga	Yamaha YFM 700R	6:05:42
5	(Hungary) Hungarian Baja	2	(Czech Republic) Kristyna Vankova	Yamaha Raptor	7:10:22
5	(Hungary) Hungarian Baja	3	(Czech Republic) Nelly Caisová	Yamaha 450R	8:42:37
6	(Portugal) Baja Portalegre	1	(Czech Republic) Nelly Caisová	Yamaha 450R	8:20:56
6	(Portugal) Baja Portalegre	2	(Saudi Arabia) Hani Al-Noumesi	Yamaha 450R	8:39:09
7	(Saudi Arabia) Saudi Baja	1	(Saudi Arabia) Haitham Al-Tuwayjiri	Yamaha Raptor 700	06:09:48
7	(Saudi Arabia) Saudi Baja	2	(Saudi Arabia) Abdalmajeed Al-Khulaifi	Yamaha Raptor 700	21:35:36
7	(Saudi Arabia) Saudi Baja	3	(United Arab Emirates) Abdulaziz Ahli	Yamaha YFZ450R	31:32:47
8	(United Arab Emirates) Dubai International Baja	1	(United Arab Emirates) Abdulaziz Ahli	Yamaha YFZ450R	8:10:40
8	(United Arab Emirates) Dubai International Baja	2	(Saudi Arabia) Abdalmajeed Al-Khulaifi	Yamaha Raptor 700	9:36:06
8	(United Arab Emirates) Dubai International Baja	3	(Saudi Arabia) Hani Al-Noumesi	Yamaha Raptor 700	13:56:29

=== SSVs ===
Round	Rally name	Podium finishers			
Round	Rally name	Rank	Rider	Bike	Time
1	Jordan Baja	1	(Israel) Roy Bartov (Israel) Guy Biton	Can-Am Maverick X3	8:24:22
1	Jordan Baja	2	(Israel) Tal Galimidi (Israel) David Galimidi	Can-Am Maverick X3	10:07:52
2	Qatar International Baja	1	(Qatar) Abdulla Al-Khelaifi (Qatar) Abdulaziz Al-Jabri	Yamaha YXZ 1000RR	3:20:05
6	(Portugal) Baja Portalegre	1	(Italy) Davide Catania (Portugal) Carlos Paulino	Can-Am XRS	6:35:06
6	(Portugal) Baja Portalegre	2	(Italy) Severino Gallini	Yamaha YXZ 1000RR	6:37:00
6	(Portugal) Baja Portalegre	3	(Italy) Gabriele Piccini (Italy) Mauro Gentilotti	Yamaha YXZ 1000RR	7:41:52

== Championship standings ==
=== Riders' championship ===
- Points for final positions in the first nine rounds are awarded as follows:

Position	1st	2nd	3rd	4th	5th	6th	7th	8th	9th	10th	11th	12th	13th	14th	15th+
Points	25	20	16	13	11	10	9	8	7	6	5	4	3	2	1

- Points for final positions in the final round are awarded as follows:

Position	1st	2nd	3rd	4th	5th	6th	7th	8th	9th	10th	11th	12th	13th	14th	15th+
Points	50	40	32	26	22	20	18	16	14	12	10	8	6	4	2

A rider's best two results from the first seven rounds, along with their result at the final round, will count for the championship standings.

==== Motorbikes ====
Pos	Rider	Manufacturer	JOR (Jordan)	QAT (Qatar)	OES (Portugal)	ARA (Spain)	HUN (Hungary)	POR (Portugal)	SAU (Saudi Arabia)	DUB (United Arab Emirates)	Points	Best Score
1	(Poland) Konrad Dąbrowski	Husqvarna		1	3	6				1	101	91
2	(United Kingdom) Makis Rees-Stavros	KTM		3					7	2	65	
3	(United Arab Emirates) Mohammed Al Balooshi	KTM	1								84	64
3	(United Arab Emirates) Mohammed Al Balooshi	Husqvarna		2					1	9	84	64
4	(Jordan) Abdullah Abu Aisheh	KTM	2	9					5	3	70	63
5	(Kuwait) Abdullah Al-Shatti	KTM	3	12					2	5	62	58
6	(Portugal) Pedro Bianchi Prata	Honda			4			2		8	49	
7	(Netherlands) Mirjam Pol	Husqvarna			5		3			7	45	
8	(Portugal) Fábio Magalhães	Honda			2			1		Ret	45	
9	(United Kingdom) Alex McInnes	Husqvarna		5					Ret	4	37	
10	(United Kingdom) Barry Howe	KTM		Ret	7	10	5			10	38	32
11	(United Kingdom) Robert Wallace	KTM		6			2				30	
12	(United Kingdom) Brett Hunt	Husqvarna							9	6	27	
13	(Poland) Joanna Modrzewska	Husqvarna		10	8		6			12	32	26
14	(Portugal) Rui Ferreira	Honda			6			3		Ret	26	
15	(Slovenia) Toni Mulec	Husqvarna					1				25	
16	(Spain) Tosha Schareina	Gas Gas				1					25	
17	(Portugal) Micael Simão	Gas Gas			1			Ret			25	
18	(Australia) Martin Chalmers	Yamaha	4						6		23	
19	(United Kingdom) Kurt Burroughs	KTM		8	9		8			13	29	22
20	(Andorra) Margot Llobera	KTM					7		15	11	20	
21	(Bahrain) Salman Farhan	Husqvarna		7				5	12		24	20
22	(Spain) Lorenzo Santolino	Sherco				2					20	
23	(Saudi Arabia) Mishal Alghuneim	Husqvarna							3		16	
24	(Hungary) Richárd Hodola	KTM				13	4				16	
25	(Portugal) Rui Gonçalves	Sherco				3					16	
26	(Saudi Arabia) Anass Al-Reheyani	KTM							4		13	
27	(Portugal) Rafael Marques	Honda			Ret			4			13	
28	(India) Harith Noah	Sherco				4					13	
29	(South Africa) Michael Anderson	KTM		4							13	
30	(France) Neels Theric	KTM				5					11	
31	(Israel) Ziv Karmi	KTM	5								11	
32	(Saudi Arabia) Ahmed Al-Jaber	KTM	6	Ret					Ret		10	
33	(Czech Republic) Jan Brabec	Husqvarna				7	Ret				9	
34	(Israel) Stav Clumeck	Husqvarna	7								9	
35	(Saudi Arabia) Abdulhalim Al-Mogeera	KTM	Ret	Ret					8		8	
36	(United Arab Emirates) Othman Alghfeli	Honda		13					11		8	
37	(Sweden) Martin Klyver	KTM				8					8	
38	(Israel) Shai Shapira	Husqvarna	8								8	
39	(Netherlands) Gerard Lubbinge	KTM							13	14	7	
40	(Israel) Alona Ben-Natan	Gas Gas	11							15	7	
41	(France) Fabrice Lardon	Husqvarna				9					7	
42	(Israel) Gad Nachmani	KTM	9								7	
43	(Egypt) Hussein Hassan	Beta							10		6	
44	(Israel) Dudai Barak	Husqvarna	10								6	
45	(France) Rodolphe Argoud	Husqvarna				11					5	
46	(Denmark) Thomas Kongshøj	Husqvarna		11							5	
47	(France) Stephane Grignac	KTM				12					4	
48	(Israel) Yael Kadshai	Husqvarna	12								4	
49	(Qatar) Mohammed Al-Thani	Honda	13								3	
50	(Saudi Arabia) Ehab Al Hakeem	Yamaha							14		2	
51	(France) Adrien Choblet	Husqvarna				14					2	
52	(Qatar) Abdulrahman Al-Sheeb	Beta	14								2	
53	(Saudi Arabia) Bader Abalkhail	Yamaha							16		1	
54	(Egypt) Mahmoud El Hashash	Beta							17		1	
55	(India) Aishwarya Pissay	Sherco				15					1	
56	(Jordan) Zaid Jaber	KTM	15								1	
57	(Jordan) Rakan Al-Batayneh	Honda	16								1	
	(Israel) Nir Clumeck	Husqvarna	Ret								0	
	(United Kingdom) Michael Stokes	KTM		Ret							0	
	(Kuwait) Sarah Khuraibet	Husqvarna		Ret							0	
Pos	Rider	Manufacturer	JOR (Jordan)	QAT (Qatar)	OES (Portugal)	ARA (Spain)	HUN (Hungary)	POR (Portugal)	SAU (Saudi Arabia)	DUB (United Arab Emirates)	Points	Best Score

==== Quads ====
Pos	Rider	Manufacturer	JOR (Jordan)	QAT (Qatar)	OES (Portugal)	ARA (Spain)	HUN (Hungary)	POR (Portugal)	SAU (Saudi Arabia)	DUB (United Arab Emirates)	Points	Best Score
1	(Saudi Arabia) Abdalmajeed Al-Khulaifi	Yamaha	1	1		6			2	2	120	90
2	(Saudi Arabia) Hani Al-Noumesi	Yamaha	2	Ret	2	5	4	2	4	3	129	72
3	(United Arab Emirates) Abdulaziz Ahli	Yamaha							3	1	66	
4	(Czech Republic) Nelly Caisová	Yamaha					3	1			41	
5	(Saudi Arabia) Haitham Al-Tuwayjiri	Yamaha	Ret						1		25	
6	(Slovakia) Juraj Varga	Yamaha				Ret	1				25	
7	(France) Alexandre Giroud	Yamaha				1					25	
8	(Spain) Teófilo Viñaras	Yamaha			1						25	
9	(Czech Republic) Kristýna Vaňková	Yamaha					2				20	
10	(Spain) Dani Vila	Yamaha				2					20	
11	(France) Jeremy Jacomelli	Yamaha				3					16	
12	(Saudi Arabia) Saif Al-Zyoud	Yamaha	3								16	
13	(France) Kévin Giroud	Yamaha				4	Ret				13	
14	(Saudi Arabia) Faisal Al-Suwayh	Yamaha	4	Ret						Ret	13	
15	(Argentina) Gaston Pando	Yamaha				7					9	
16	(Spain) Toni Vingut	Yamaha				8					8	
	(Belgium) Emiel Stuckens	Can-Am		Ret							0	
	(France) Jerome Connart	Yamaha				Ret					0	
Pos	Rider	Manufacturer	JOR (Jordan)	QAT (Qatar)	OES (Portugal)	ARA (Spain)	HUN (Hungary)	POR (Portugal)	SAU (Saudi Arabia)	DUB (United Arab Emirates)	Points	Best Score

==== Women ====
Pos	Rider	Manufacturer	JOR (Jordan)	QAT (Qatar)	OES (Portugal)	ARA (Spain)	HUN (Hungary)	POR (Portugal)	SAU (Saudi Arabia)	DUB (United Arab Emirates)	Points	Best Score
1	(Netherlands) Mirjam Pol	Husqvarna			1		1			1	100	
2	(Poland) Joanna Modrzewska	Husqvarna		1	2		2			3	97	77
3	(Andorra) Margot Llobera	KTM					5		1	2	76	
4	(Israel) Alona Ben-Natan	Gas Gas	1							4	51	
5	(Czech Republic) Nelly Caisová	Yamaha					4	1			38	
6	(India) Aishwarya Pissay	Sherco				1					25	
7	(Israel) Yael Kadshai	Husqvarna	2								20	
8	(Czech Republic) Kristýna Vaňková	Yamaha					3				16	
	(Kuwait) Sarah Khuraibet	Husqvarna		Ret							0	
Pos	Rider	Manufacturer	JOR (Jordan)	QAT (Qatar)	OES (Portugal)	ARA (Spain)	HUN (Hungary)	POR (Portugal)	SAU (Saudi Arabia)	DUB (United Arab Emirates)	Points	Best Score

==== Junior ====
Pos	Rider	Manufacturer	JOR (Jordan)	QAT (Qatar)	OES (Portugal)	ARA (Spain)	HUN (Hungary)	POR (Portugal)	SAU (Saudi Arabia)	DUB (United Arab Emirates)	Points	Best Score
1	(Poland) Konrad Dąbrowski	Husqvarna		1	1	2				1	120	100
2	(United Kingdom) Alex McInnes	Husqvarna		2					Ret	2	60	
3	(Czech Republic) Nelly Caisová	Yamaha					3	1			41	
4	(United Kingdom) Robert Wallace	KTM		3			1				41	
5	(Egypt) Hussein Hassan	Beta							1		25	
6	(France) Neels Theric	KTM				1					25	
7	(Jordan) Zaid Jaber	KTM	1								25	
8	(Czech Republic) Kristýna Vaňková	Yamaha					2				20	
9	(France) Kévin Giroud	Yamaha				3	Ret				16	
Pos	Rider	Manufacturer	JOR (Jordan)	QAT (Qatar)	OES (Portugal)	ARA (Spain)	HUN (Hungary)	POR (Portugal)	SAU (Saudi Arabia)	DUB (United Arab Emirates)	Points	Best Score

==== Veteran ====
Pos	Rider	Manufacturer	JOR (Jordan)	QAT (Qatar)	OES (Portugal)	ARA (Spain)	HUN (Hungary)	POR (Portugal)	SAU (Saudi Arabia)	DUB (United Arab Emirates)	Points	Best Score
1	(Portugal) Pedro Bianchi Prata	Honda			1			1		1	100	
2	(United Kingdom) Kurt Burroughs	KTM		1	4		2			2	98	85
3	(United Kingdom) Barry Howe	KTM		Ret	3	3	1			3	89	73
4	(Netherlands) Gerard Lubbinge	KTM							2	4	46	
5	(United Arab Emirates) Othman Alghfeli	Honda		2					1		45	
6	(Portugal) Rui Ferreira	Honda			2			2		Ret	40	
7	(Sweden) Martin Klyver	KTM				1					25	
8	(Israel) Shai Shapira	Husqvarna	1								25	
9	(France) Fabrice Lardon	Husqvarna				2					20	
10	(Israel) Gad Nachmani	KTM	2								20	
11	(Portugal) Rafael Marques	Honda			Ret			3			16	
12	(Israel) Dudai Barak	Husqvarna	3								16	
13	(France) Rodolphe Argoud	KTM				4					13	
14	(Qatar) Mohammed Al-Thani	Honda	4								13	
15	(France) Stephane Grignac	KTM				5					11	
16	(Saudi Arabia) Saif Al-Zyoud	Yamaha	5								11	
17	(Argentina) Gaston Pando	Yamaha				6					10	
18	(Spain) Toni Vingut	Yamaha				7					9	
	(Israel) Nir Clumeck	Husqvarna	Ret								0	
Pos	Rider	Manufacturer	JOR (Jordan)	QAT (Qatar)	OES (Portugal)	ARA (Spain)	HUN (Hungary)	POR (Portugal)	SAU (Saudi Arabia)	DUB (United Arab Emirates)	Points	Best Score

==== SSVs ====
Pos	Rider	Manufacturer	JOR (Jordan)	QAT (Qatar)	OES (Portugal)	ARA (Spain)	HUN (Hungary)	POR (Portugal)	SAU (Saudi Arabia)	DUB (United Arab Emirates)	Points	Best Score
1	(Italy) Davide Catania (Portugal) Carlos Paulino	Can-Am						1			25	
2	(Qatar) Abdulla Al-Khelaifi (Qatar) Abdulaziz Al-Jabri	Yamaha		1							25	
3	(Israel) Roy Bartov (Israel) Guy Biton	Can-Am	1								25	
4	(Italy) Severino Gallini	Yamaha						2			20	
5	(Israel) Tal Galimidi (Israel) David Galimidi	Can-Am	2								20	
6	(Italy) Gabriele Piccini (Italy) Mauro Gentilotti	Yamaha						3			16	
	(Italy) Alessandro Tinaburri (Italy) Emiliano Tinaburri	Yamaha						Ret			0	
Pos	Rider	Manufacturer	JOR (Jordan)	QAT (Qatar)	OES (Portugal)	ARA (Spain)	HUN (Hungary)	POR (Portugal)	SAU (Saudi Arabia)	DUB (United Arab Emirates)	Points	Best Score

=== Manufacturers Championship ===
- Points for manufacturers are awarded by the points of the top two riders per manufacturer at each baja being added together:

Pos	Manufacturer	JOR (Jordan)	QAT (Qatar)	OES (Portugal)	ARA (Spain)	HUN (Hungary)	POR (Portugal)	SAU (Saudi Arabia)	DUB (United Arab Emirates)	Points
1	(Austria) KTM	45	29	25	21	33	11	33	90	267
2	(Austria) Husqvarna	17	45	19	16	41		41	46	223
3	(Japan) Honda	4	3	33			45	15	16	116
4	(Austria) Gas Gas	5		25	25				2	57
5	(France) Sherco				36					36
6	(Japan) Yamaha	13						3		16
7	(Italy) Beta	2						7		9
Pos	Manufacturer	JOR (Jordan)	QAT (Qatar)	OES (Portugal)	ARA (Spain)	HUN (Hungary)	POR (Portugal)	SAU (Saudi Arabia)	DUB (United Arab Emirates)	Points
