= 2025 FIM Bajas World Cup =

Motorsport season

2025 FIM Bajas World Cup
Previous:	2024	Next:	2026

The 2025 FIM Bajas World Cup season was the 14th season of the FIM Bajas World Cup, an international rally raid competition for motorbikes, quads and SSVs.

== Calendar ==
The calendar for the 2025 season was scheduled to have eight rounds, with some of the events also being part of 2025 FIA World Cup for Cross-Country Bajas.

The sixth round in Hungary was later cancelled after the season had started.

Round	Dates	Rally name
1	30 January–1 February	(Saudi Arabia) Saudi Baja
2	21–23 March	(Portugal) Baja TT do Oeste
3	10–12 April	Jordan Baja
4	1–3 May	(Spain) Baja TT Dehesa Extremadura
5	25–27 July	(Spain) Baja Aragon
	~~15–17 August~~	~~Baja Hungary~~
6	6–8 November	Baja Qatar
7	20–23 November	(United Arab Emirates) Dubai International Baja

== Regulations ==
The following classes and categories are included:

- Category 1: Bike (Up to 450cc single or twin cylinder, 2T or 4T)
- Category 2: Quads (three-wheel vehicles are forbidden)
- Category 3: Trail (more than 600cc, twin cylinder or more and with the minimum weight of 165kg. The maximum speed for this category is 130 km/h.)
- Category 4: SSV
- Class 1: Women
- Class 2: Junior
- Class 3: Veterans

All the other categories i.e “Over 450cc” do not count towards the FIM Bajas World Cups & Trophy.

== Teams and riders ==
Bajas World Cup
Constructor	Team	Rider	Rounds
(Italy) Beta		(Italy) Emanuele Gallone	1
(Italy) Beta	Cloud Racing	(Mexico) Christophe Suberville	6
(Italy) Fantic		(Qatar) Abdulrahman Al-Sheeb	6
(Italy) Fantic	Team Alhakeem	(Lebanon) Ehab Alhakeem	6
(Austria) Gas Gas	BOAC Racing	(Australia) Martin Chalmers	1
(Austria) Gas Gas	ANB Motorsports	(Jordan) Abdallah Abuaisheh	3
(Austria) Gas Gas	Sandlander Motors/X-Grip	(Hungary) Norbert Zsigovits	5
(Austria) Gas Gas	Rally POV	(Italy) Tiziano Internò	5
(Austria) Gas Gas		(Poland) Michał Janaszek	6
(Austria) Gas Gas		(Poland) Marcin Talaga	6–7
(Austria) Gas Gas	Desert Spirit	(United Kingdom) Jason Joslin	6–7
(Austria) Gas Gas		(Poland) Tomasz Niedźwiedzki	6–7
(Japan) Honda	Monster Energy Honda HRC	(Spain) Tosha Schareina	4
(Japan) Honda	RS Moto Honda Rally Team	(Italy) Paolo Lucci	5
(Japan) Honda		(United Kingdom) Robbie Wallace	6
(Austria) Husqvarna	Desert Spirit	(United Kingdom) Jason Joslin	1, 3
(Austria) Husqvarna		(Qatar) Abdullatif Mojadam	1
(Austria) Husqvarna		(Qatar) Yaghoob Azadi	1
(Austria) Husqvarna	Bs – Frutas Patricia Pilar	(Portugal) Bruno Santos	4
(Austria) Husqvarna		(Spain) Borja Pérez	5
(Austria) Husqvarna	Team Dovland	(Norway) Hans Kristian Dovland	6
(Austria) Husqvarna		(Netherlands) Luc Dumore	6
(Austria) Husqvarna		(Mexico) Roberto Mariscal	6
(Austria) Husqvarna		(Italy) Emanuele Gallone	6
(Austria) Husqvarna		(Mexico) Fernando Pasquel	6
(Austria) Husqvarna	Team Alhakeem	(Lebanon) Ehab Alhakeem	7
(Austria) Husqvarna	AG Dakar School	(Lithuania) Saulius Klevinskas	7
(China) Kove		(Saudi Arabia) Ibrahim Aljarallah	1
(China) Kove		(Saudi Arabia) Mohammed Almuaikil	1
(China) Kove	SRG Motorsports	(United Arab Emirates) Abdulla Lanjawi	1, 6–7
(China) Kove	Pont Grup Kove	(Spain) Javi Vega	1–2, 4–5
(China) Kove		(Australia) Thomas Cross	1, 3
(China) Kove	Kove Factory Racing	(France) Neels Theric	5
(China) Kove	Kove Factory Racing	(China) Sunier Sunier	5
(China) Kove	Orion - Moto Racing Group	(Czech Republic) Milan Engel	5
(China) Kove	Chasing Borders	(Norway) Peter Solnør	6
(China) Kove	Inotherm/KOVE MOTO Slovenija	(Slovenia) Simon Marčič	6
(China) Kove	Desert Storm Racing	(Saudi Arabia) Badr Al-Hamdan	6
(Austria) KTM		(United Kingdom) Maki Rees-Stavros	1, 6–7
(Austria) KTM	RNS Electronics	(Germany) Tony Schattat	1, 6–7
(Austria) KTM		(Saudi Arabia) Abdulrahman Almed	1
(Austria) KTM	Desert Spirit	(United Arab Emirates) Hamdan Al-Ali	1, 3
(Austria) KTM	North Squad	(Germany) Philip Horlemann	1, 3, 6–7
(Austria) KTM	Vendetta Racing	(United Kingdom) Thomas Childs	3, 6–7
(Austria) KTM		(Hungary) Richárd Hodola	5
(Austria) KTM	Joyride Race Service	(Spain) Iñigo Zardoya	5
(Austria) KTM	RS Motos/Kang Racing Mexico	(Mexico) Leoncio Reynoso	6
(Austria) KTM		(Portugal) Michael Anderson	6
(Austria) KTM	Duust Rally Team	(France) Jean-Loup Lepan	6–7
(Austria) KTM	Duust Rally Team	(Poland) Tomasz Orwat	7
(Austria) KTM		(Qatar) Mohammed Al-Kubaisi	6
(Austria) KTM		(Croatia) Jakov Jukić	6
(Austria) KTM		(Republic of Ireland) Oran O'Kelly	6
(Austria) KTM	BAS World KTM Racing Team	(France) Mathieu Doveze	7
(Austria) KTM	AG Dakar School	(Lithuania) Edvard Sokolovskij	7
(Austria) KTM		(Croatia) Darko Marasovic	7
(France) Sherco	Sherco TVS Rally Factory	(Spain) Lorenzo Santolino	5
(France) Sherco	Sherco TVS Rally Factory	(South Africa) Bradley Cox	5
(France) Sherco	Sherco TVS Rally Factory	(India) Harith Noah	5–6
(Japan) Yamaha	Markazia Yamaha Jordan	(Jordan) Abdallah Abuaisheh	6
(Japan) Yamaha		(Jordan) Tla'at Al-Shishane	6
(Japan) Yamaha		(India) Farooq Husain	7
Women's Bajas World Cup
Constructor	Team	Rider	Rounds
(Austria) Gas Gas		(Israel) Alona Ben Natan	2, 4–5
(Japan) Honda		(India) Sarah Kashyap	1
(Japan) Honda	Team Offroad Center Bianchi Prata	(Ecuador) Maria Taranto	2, 5
(Austria) Husqvarna		(Kuwait) Sarah Khuraibet	1, 6
(Austria) Husqvarna	Duust Rally Team	(Poland) Joanna Modrzewska	5–7
(Austria) Husqvarna	AG Dakar School	(Israel) Alona Ben Natan	7
(China) Kove	Kove Factory Racing	(Germany) Lili-May Mansuy	5
(Austria) KTM	Duust Rally Team	(Lithuania) Raimonda Biguzaite	7
(Japan) Yamaha	MotocrossCenter	(Spain) Sara García	4–5
Junior Bajas World Cup
Constructor	Team	Rider	Rounds
(Japan) Honda	Honda Motorcycles Jordan	(Jordan) Abdallah Al-Batayneh	3
(Austria) Husqvarna	MotoZone Racing	(United Kingdom) Alex McInnes	1, 6–7
(Austria) Husqvarna	BP Ultimate Adventure Team	(Portugal) Martim Ventura	2
(Austria) Husqvarna		(Spain) Víctor Moya	4–5
(Austria) Husqvarna		(Slovenia) Taj Karo	7
(Austria) KTM		(South Africa) Hanno Geyser	1
(Austria) KTM	Red Bull KTM Factory Racing	(Spain) Edgar Canet	4
(Austria) KTM	Duust Rally Team	(Poland) Konrad Dąbrowski	5–7
(Austria) KTM	Joyride Race Service	(Spain) Martí Escofet	5
(Austria) KTM	JG Racing	(Germany) Justin Gerlach	6
(China) Kove	Kove Factory Racing	(Germany) Lili-May Mansuy	5
(China) Kove	Motorrad Konnection	(United Kingdom) Benjamin Harvey-Grounds	6
(China) Kove	RS Motos/Italika	(Mexico) Mauricio Reynoso	6
(Japan) Yamaha		(Portugal) António Feliciano	2
Veteran Bajas World Cup
Constructor	Team	Rider	Rounds
(Italy) Fantic	MX Ride Dubai	(United Arab Emirates) Mohammed Al-Balooshi	4
(Austria) Gas Gas		(France) Lionel Vericel	5
(Austria) Gas Gas	MX Ride Dubai	(Lebanon) Rafic Eid	1, 3, 5–7
(Japan) Honda	Team Offroad Center Bianchi Prata	(Lebanon) Rafic Eid	2, 4
(Japan) Honda	Team Offroad Center Bianchi Prata	(Ecuador) Maria Taranto	2, 5
(Japan) Honda	Team Offroad Center Bianchi Prata	(France) Frédéric Fontarosa	2, 5
(Japan) Honda		(United Kingdom) Steven Holt	6
(Austria) Husqvarna		(France) Frédéric Fontarosa	6–7
(Austria) Husqvarna		(Australia) Andrew Houlihan	6
(Austria) Husqvarna		(Canada) Matthew Glade	6
(Austria) Husqvarna		(Norway) Erik Myrberget	6
(Austria) Husqvarna	Duust Rally Team	(Poland) Norbert Świętochowski	6
(Austria) Husqvarna		(Australia) Matthew Roach	6
(Japan) Kawasaki	Racing Team 25	(Portugal) Paulo Cardoso	2, 4–5
(Austria) KTM		(Portugal) Jorge Brandão	2, 4–5
(Austria) KTM	MX Ride Dubai	(United Arab Emirates) Sultan Al-Shanqiti	2–7
(Austria) KTM	Joyride Race Service	(Switzerland) Dennis Mildenberger	5
(Austria) KTM	Joyride Race Service	(Australia) David Brock	5
(Austria) KTM		(France) Jeff Chetail	5
(Austria) KTM		(Sweden) Martin Klyver	5
(Austria) KTM		(Portugal) Nuno Silva	5
(Austria) KTM		(Belgium) Patrick Butaye	5
(Austria) KTM		(Mexico) Ladislao Hernández	6
(Austria) KTM		(United Kingdom) Stefan Mieczkowski	1, 6
(Austria) KTM	Duust Rally Team	(United Kingdom) Sławomir Sypień	6
(Austria) KTM	MX Ride Dubai	(United Arab Emirates) Mohammed Al-Balooshi	2, 6
(Austria) Husqvarna	MX Ride Dubai	(United Arab Emirates) Mohammed Al-Balooshi	1, 3, 7
(Austria) Husqvarna		(United Kingdom) Barry Howe	1, 3
(Austria) Husqvarna	SRG Motorsports	(Poland) Jacek Bartoszek	7
(China) Kove		(France) Frédéric Fontarosa	1, 3
(China) Kove		(Italy) Cesare Salvi	5
(China) Kove		(Japan) Yuji Kahara	5
(China) Kove	Desert Storm Racing	(India) Jatin Jain	6
(China) Kove		(Poland) Tomasz Dąbrowski	7
(Japan) Yamaha		(Croatia) Muhamed Pličanič	6
Trail Bajas World Cup
Constructor	Team	Rider	Rounds
(Italy) Aprilia		(Spain) Julio López	5
(Austria) KTM		(Italy) Nicola Dutto	5
(China) Kove	Kove Italia	(Italy) Matteo Bottino	5
(Japan) Yamaha	Yamaha Motor Portugal	(Portugal) António Maio	2
(Japan) Yamaha	Yamaha Motor Time	(Italy) Alessandro Ruoso	2, 4–5
Quad Bajas World Cup
Constructor	Team	Rider	Rounds
(Japan) Honda		(Spain) Victor Carles	5
(Austria) KTM		(Spain) Alejandro García	4–5
(Japan) Yamaha		(Saudi Arabia) Hani Al-Noumesi	1–3, 6–7
(Japan) Yamaha		(Saudi Arabia) Abdulaziz Alshayban	1
(Japan) Yamaha		(Saudi Arabia) Abdulaziz Alatawi	1, 6
(Japan) Yamaha		(Saudi Arabia) Haitham Altuwayjiri	1
(Japan) Yamaha		(Saudi Arabia) Abdulaziz Alshammari	1
(Japan) Yamaha	Knull Racing	(Portugal) Jorge Sampaio	2, 4–5
(Japan) Yamaha		(France) Antoine Sanchez	4–5
(Japan) Yamaha	Team Arnaldo Martins/Gallos Group/Goldspeed	(Portugal) Tomás Paulo	5
(Japan) Yamaha		(France) Jérôme Connart	5
(Japan) Yamaha		(Spain) Toni Vingut	5
(Japan) Yamaha	Team Giroud	(France) Kévin Giroud	5
(Japan) Yamaha		(United Arab Emirates) Abdulaziz Ahli	6–7
(Japan) Yamaha		(Qatar) Yaghoob Azadi	6
(Japan) Yamaha	SQGP Racing Team	(Poland) Marcin Wilkolek	7
SSV Bajas World Cup
Constructor	Team	Rider	Rounds

== Results ==
=== Motorbikes ===
Round	Rally name	Podium finishers			
Round	Rally name	Rank	Rider	Bike	Time
1	(Saudi Arabia) Saudi Baja	1	(United Kingdom) Alex McInnes	Husqvarna FE450	05:36:35
1	(Saudi Arabia) Saudi Baja	2	(United Arab Emirates) Mohammed Al-Balooshi	Husqvarna Rally	05:52:47
1	(Saudi Arabia) Saudi Baja	3	(United Arab Emirates) Abdulla Lanjawi	Kove 450 Rally	06:04:09
2	(Portugal) Baja do Oeste	1	(Portugal) Martim Ventura	Husqvarna FE450	06:03:01
2	(Portugal) Baja do Oeste	2	(Portugal) Jorge Brandão	KTM EXC	06:35:54
2	(Portugal) Baja do Oeste	3	(Portugal) Paulo Cardoso	Kawasaki KXF	06:53:05
3	Jordan Baja	1	(United Arab Emirates) Mohammed Al-Balooshi	Husqvarna RR 450	07:53:52
3	Jordan Baja	2	(Lebanon) Rafic Eid	Gas Gas RX Rally Bike	07:56:16
3	Jordan Baja	3	(Germany) Philip Horlemann	KTM 450 Rally Replica	08:08:54
4	(Spain) Baja TT Dehesa Extremadura	1	(Spain) Tosha Schareina	Honda CRF 450 Rally	9:56:51
4	(Spain) Baja TT Dehesa Extremadura	2	(Spain) Javi Vega	Kove 450 Rally EX	10:15:25
4	(Spain) Baja TT Dehesa Extremadura	3	(Portugal) Bruno Santos	Husqvarna FR 450 Rally	10:24:39
5	(Spain) Baja Aragon	1	(Spain) Lorenzo Santolino	Sherco 450 SEF Rally	06:38:59
5	(Spain) Baja Aragon	2	(France) Neels Theric	Kove Rally EX	06:45:08
5	(Spain) Baja Aragon	3	(Spain) Javi Vega	Kove Rally EX	06:56:16
6	Baja Qatar	1	(Poland) Konrad Dąbrowski	KTM 450 Rally	06:37:11
6	Baja Qatar	2	(United Arab Emirates) Mohammed Al-Balooshi	KTM 450 RR	07:08:28
6	Baja Qatar	3	(France) Jean-Loup Lepan	KTM 450 Rally	07:18:30
7	(United Arab Emirates) Dubai International Baja	1	(Poland) Konrad Dąbrowski	KTM 450 Rally	06:05:11
7	(United Arab Emirates) Dubai International Baja	2	(United Kingdom) Alex McInnes	KTM EXC	06:05:45
7	(United Arab Emirates) Dubai International Baja	3	(United Arab Emirates) Mohammed Al-Balooshi	Yamaha 450 YZF	06:09:35

=== Quads ===
Round	Rally name	Podium finishers			
Round	Rally name	Rank	Rider	Bike	Time
1	(Saudi Arabia) Saudi Baja	1	(Saudi Arabia) Haitham Altuwayjiri	Yamaha Raptor 700	06:58:24
1	(Saudi Arabia) Saudi Baja	2	(Saudi Arabia) Abdulaziz Alshayban	Yamaha Raptor 700	07:00:07
1	(Saudi Arabia) Saudi Baja	3	(Saudi Arabia) Hani Al-Noumesi	Yamaha Raptor 700	07:03:23
2	(Portugal) Baja do Oeste	1	(Portugal) Jorge Sampaio	Yamaha AJ42 (450R)	07:05:57
2	(Portugal) Baja do Oeste	2	(Saudi Arabia) Hani Al-Noumesi	Yamaha Raptor 700	07:45:58
3	Jordan Baja	1	(Saudi Arabia) Hani Al-Noumesi	Yamaha Raptor 700	08:25:01
4	(Spain) Baja TT Dehesa Extremadura	1	(France) Antoine Sanchez	Yamaha YFM 700	11:05:50
4	(Spain) Baja TT Dehesa Extremadura	2	(Portugal) Jorge Sampaio	Yamaha AJ42 (450R)	13:55:02
5	(Spain) Baja Aragon	1	(France) Jérôme Connart	Yamaha 700R	07:06:15
5	(Spain) Baja Aragon	2	(France) Antoine Sanchez	Yamaha YFM 700	07:24:05
5	(Spain) Baja Aragon	3	(Spain) Alejandro García	KTM 525XC	07:39:44
6	Baja Qatar	1	(United Arab Emirates) Abdulaziz Ahli	Yamaha Raptor 700 R	08:04:21
6	Baja Qatar	2	(Saudi Arabia) Hani Al-Noumesi	Yamaha Raptor	09:42:40
7	(United Arab Emirates) Dubai International Baja	1	(United Arab Emirates) Abdulaziz Ahli	Yamaha Raptor 700	07:39:34
7	(United Arab Emirates) Dubai International Baja	2	(Poland) Marcin Wilkolek	Yamaha Raptor 700	07:55:04
7	(United Arab Emirates) Dubai International Baja	3	(Saudi Arabia) Hani Al-Noumesi	Yamaha Raptor 700	09:38:04

== Championship standings ==
=== Riders' championship ===
- Points for final positions are awarded as follows:

Position	1st	2nd	3rd	4th	5th	6th	7th	8th	9th	10th	11th	12th	13th	14th	15th+
Points	25	20	16	13	11	10	9	8	7	6	5	4	3	2	1

A rider's best six results will count towards their final position in the final standings.

==== Motorbikes ====
Pos	Rider	Manufacturer	SAU (Saudi Arabia)	OES (Portugal)	JOR (Jordan)	EXT (Spain)	ARA (Spain)	QAT (Qatar)	DUB (United Arab Emirates)	Points	Best Score
1	(United Arab Emirates) Mohammed Al-Balooshi	Husqvarna	2		1					103	
1	(United Arab Emirates) Mohammed Al-Balooshi	KTM		5				2		103	
1	(United Arab Emirates) Mohammed Al-Balooshi	Fantic				5				103	
1	(United Arab Emirates) Mohammed Al-Balooshi	Yamaha							3	103	
2	(Lebanon) Rafic Eid	Gas Gas	5		2		11	12	8	70	66
2	(Lebanon) Rafic Eid	Honda		4		7				70	66
3	(Poland) Konrad Dąbrowski	KTM					4	1	1	63	
4	(United Kingdom) Alex McInnes	Husqvarna	1					7	2	54	
5	(Spain) Javi Vega	Kove	4	Ret		2	3			49	
6	(Portugal) Jorge Brandão	KTM		2		4	9			40	
7	(Germany) Philip Horlemann	KTM	9		3			5	12	38	
8	(Portugal) Paulo Cardoso	Kawasaki		3		6	12			30	
9	(United Arab Emirates) Abdulla Lanjawi	Kove	3					25	5	28	
10	(United Arab Emirates) Sultan Al-Shanqiti	KTM		6	7	11	29	30	18	27	
11	(France) Jean-Loup Lepan	KTM						3	6	26	
12	(Spain) Lorenzo Santolino	Sherco					1			25	
13	(Spain) Tosha Schareina	Honda				1				25	
14	(Portugal) Martim Ventura	Husqvarna		1						25	
15	(United Kingdom) Maki Rees-Stavros	KTM	Ret					4	7	22	
16	(France) Neels Theric	Kove					2			20	
17	(India) Harith Noah	Sherco					5	8		19	
18	(Israel) Alona Ben Natan	Gas Gas		7		10	28		25	17	
19	(Portugal) Bruno Santos	Husqvarna				3				16	
20	(France) Frédéric Fontarosa	Kove	Ret		10					16	
20	(France) Frédéric Fontarosa	Honda		9			27			16	
20	(France) Frédéric Fontarosa	Husqvarna						36	20	16	
21	(United Kingdom) Barry Howe	Husqvarna	11		6					15	
22	(Australia) Thomas Cross	Kove	6		11					15	
23	(Jordan) Abdallah Abuaisheh	Gas Gas			4					14	
23	(Jordan) Abdallah Abuaisheh	Yamaha						18		14	
24	(Spain) Sara García	Yamaha				8	10			14	
25	(France) Mathieu Doveze	KTM							4	13	
26	(United Kingdom) Thomas Childs	KTM			5			15	17	13	
27	(United Kingdom) Jason Joslin	Husqvarna	13		8			23	24	12	
28	(Portugal) Michael Anderson	KTM						6		10	
29	(Spain) Martí Escofet	KTM					6			10	
30	(Hungary) Norbert Zsigovits	Gas Gas					7			9	
31	(South Africa) Hanno Geyser	KTM	7							9	
32	(Ecuador) Maria Taranto	Honda		8			32			9	
33	(Spain) Iñigo Zardoya	KTM					8			8	
34	(United Arab Emirates) Hamdan Al-Ali	KTM	8		Ret					8	
35	(Spain) Víctor Moya	Husqvarna				9	22			8	
36	(Slovenia) Taj Karo	Husqvarna							9	7	
37	(Norway) Peter Solnør	Kove						9		7	
38	(Jordan) Abdallah Al-Batayneh	Honda			9					7	
39	(Lithuania) Edvard Sokolovskij	KTM							10	6	
40	(Norway) Hans Kristian Dovland	Husqvarna						10		6	
41	(Australia) Martin Chalmers	Gas Gas	10							6	
42	(Lithuania) Saulius Klevinskas	Husqvarna							11	5	
43	(Slovenia) Simon Marčič	Kove						11		5	
44	(Saudi Arabia) Ibrahim Aljarallah	Kove	12							4	
45	(Germany) Tony Schattat	KTM	14					26	21	4	
46	(Poland) Tomasz Orwat	KTM							13	3	
47	(Germany) Justin Gerlach	KTM						13		3	
48	(Germany) Lili-May Mansuy	Kove					13			3	
49	(Poland) Marcin Talaga	Gas Gas						19	14	3	
50	(Poland) Joanna Modrzewska	Husqvarna					25	22	22	3	
51	(Australia) Andrew Houlihan	Husqvarna						14		2	
52	(Japan) Yuji Kahara	Kove					14			2	
53	(Poland) Tomasz Niedźwiedzki	Gas Gas						35	19	2	
54	(Croatia) Darko Marasovic	KTM							15	1	
55	(China) Sunier Sunier	Kove					15			1	
56	(Qatar) Yaghoob Azadi	Husqvarna	15							1	
57	(Lebanon) Ehab Alhakeem	Yamaha						Ret		1	
57	(Lebanon) Ehab Alhakeem	Husqvarna							16	1	
58	(Saudi Arabia) Badr Al-Hamdan	Kove						16		1	
59	(Australia) David Brock	KTM					16			1	
60	(Kuwait) Sarah Khuraibet	Husqvarna	16					Ret		1	
61	(Italy) Emanuele Gallone	Beta	Ret							1	
61	(Italy) Emanuele Gallone	Husqvarna						17		1	
62	(Portugal) Nuno Silva	KTM					17			1	
63	(Saudi Arabia) Abdulrahman Almed	KTM	17							1	
64	(Sweden) Martin Klyver	KTM					18			1	
65	(United Kingdom) Stefan Mieczkowski	KTM	18					Ret		1	
66	(Switzerland) Dennis Mildenberger	KTM					19			1	
67	(Saudi Arabia) Mohammed Almuaikil	Kove	19							1	
68	(Qatar) Mohammed Al-Kubaisi	KTM						20		1	
69	(France) Lionel Vericel	Gas Gas					20			1	
70	(Netherlands) Luc Dumore	Husqvarna						21		1	
71	(Spain) Borja Pérez	Husqvarna					21			1	
72	(Poland) Jacek Bartoszek	Husqvarna							23	1	
73	(Hungary) Richárd Hodola	KTM					23			1	
74	(United Kingdom) Robbie Wallace	Honda						24		1	
75	(Belgium) Patrick Butaye	KTM					24			1	
76	(India) Farooq Husain	Husqvarna							26	1	
77	(Italy) Cesare Salvi	Kove					26			1	
78	(Poland) Tomasz Dąbrowski	Kove							27	1	
79	(Croatia) Jakov Jukić	KTM						27		1	
80	(Lithuania) Raimonda Biguzaite	KTM							28	1	
81	(Mexico) Leoncio Reynoso	KTM						28		1	
82	(Mexico) Roberto Mariscal	Husqvarna						29		1	
83	(Czech Republic) Milan Engel	Kove					30			1	
84	(India) Jatin Jain	Kove						31		1	
85	(Italy) Tiziano Internò	Gas Gas					31			1	
86	(United Kingdom) Benjamin Harvey-Grounds	Kove						32		1	
87	(Mexico) Ladislao Hernández	KTM						33		1	
88	(Canada) Matthew Glade	Husqvarna						34		1	
89	(Republic of Ireland) Oran O'Kelly	KTM						37		1	
90	(Jordan) Tla'at Al-Shishane	Yamaha						38		1	
91	(Mexico) Mauricio Reynoso	Kove						39		1	
	(Qatar) Abdulrahman Al-Sheeb	Fantic						Ret		0	
	(United Kingdom) Steven Holt	Honda						Ret		0	
	(United Kingdom) Sławomir Sypień	KTM						Ret		0	
	(Australia) Matthew Roach	Husqvarna						Ret		0	
	(Croatia) Muhamed Pličanċ	Yamaha						Ret		0	
	(Norway) Erik Myrberget	Husqvarna						Ret		0	
	(Mexico) Christophe Suberville	Beta						Ret		0	
	(Mexico) Fernando Pasquel	Husqvarna						Ret		0	
	(Poland) Michał Janaszek	Gas Gas						Ret		0	
	(Poland) Norbert Świętochowski	Husqvarna						Ret		0	
	(South Africa) Bradley Cox	Sherco					Ret			0	
	(France) Jeff Chetail	KTM					Ret			0	
	(Italy) Paolo Lucci	Honda					Ret			0	
	(Spain) Edgar Canet	KTM				Ret				0	
	(Portugal) António Feliciano	Yamaha		Ret						0	
	(India) Sarah Kashyap	Honda	Ret							0	
	(Qatar) Abdullatif Mojadam	Husqvarna	Ret							0	
Pos	Rider	Manufacturer	SAU (Saudi Arabia)	OES (Portugal)	JOR (Jordan)	EXT (Spain)	ARA (Spain)	QAT (Qatar)	DUB (United Arab Emirates)	Points	Best Score

==== Quads ====
Pos	Rider	Manufacturer	SAU (Saudi Arabia)	OES (Portugal)	JOR (Jordan)	EXT (Spain)	ARA (Spain)	QAT (Qatar)	DUB (United Arab Emirates)	Points	Best Score
1	(Saudi Arabia) Hani Al-Noumesi	Yamaha	3	2	1			2	3	97	
2	(United Arab Emirates) Abdulaziz Ahli	Yamaha						1	1	50	
3	(France) Antoine Sanchez	Yamaha				1	2			45	
4	(Portugal) Jorge Sampaio	Yamaha		1		2	Ret			45	
5	(France) Jérôme Connart	Yamaha					1			25	
6	(Saudi Arabia) Haitham Altuwayjiri	Yamaha	1							25	
7	(Poland) Marcin Wilkolek	Yamaha							2	20	
8	(Saudi Arabia) Abdulaziz Alshayban	Yamaha	2							20	
9	(Spain) Alejandro García	KTM				Ret	3			16	
10	(Spain) Victor Carles	Honda					4			13	
11	(Saudi Arabia) Abdulaziz Alshammari	Yamaha	4							13	
12	(Spain) Toni Vingut	Yamaha					5			11	
13	(Saudi Arabia) Abdulaziz Alatawi	Yamaha	5					Ret		11	
14	(France) Kévin Giroud	Yamaha					6			10	
	(Qatar) Yaghoob Azadi	Yamaha						Ret		0	
	(Portugal) Tomás Paulo	Yamaha					Ret			0	
Pos	Rider	Manufacturer	SAU (Saudi Arabia)	OES (Portugal)	JOR (Jordan)	EXT (Spain)	ARA (Spain)	QAT (Qatar)	DUB (United Arab Emirates)	Points	Best Score

==== Women ====
Pos	Rider	Manufacturer	SAU (Saudi Arabia)	OES (Portugal)	JOR (Jordan)	EXT (Spain)	ARA (Spain)	QAT (Qatar)	DUB (United Arab Emirates)	Points	Best Score
1	(Israel) Alona Ben Natan	Gas Gas		1		2	4		2	78	
2	(Poland) Joanna Modrzewska	Husqvarna					3	1	1	66	
3	(Spain) Sara García	Yamaha				1	1			50	
4	(Ecuador) Maria Taranto	Honda		2			5			31	
5	(Kuwait) Sarah Khuraibet	Husqvarna	1					Ret		25	
6	(Germany) Lili-May Mansuy	Kove					2			20	
7	(Lithuania) Raimonda Biguzaite	KTM							3	16	
	(India) Sarah Kashyap	Honda	Ret							0	
Pos	Rider	Manufacturer	SAU (Saudi Arabia)	OES (Portugal)	JOR (Jordan)	EXT (Spain)	ARA (Spain)	QAT (Qatar)	DUB (United Arab Emirates)	Points	Best Score

==== Junior ====
Pos	Rider	Manufacturer	SAU (Saudi Arabia)	OES (Portugal)	JOR (Jordan)	EXT (Spain)	ARA (Spain)	QAT (Qatar)	DUB (United Arab Emirates)	Points	Best Score
1	(Poland) Konrad Dąbrowski	KTM					1	1	1	75	
2	(United Kingdom) Alex McInnes	Husqvarna	1					2	2	65	
3	(Spain) Víctor Moya	Husqvarna				1	4			38	
4	(Jordan) Abdallah Al-Batayneh	Honda			1					25	
5	(Portugal) Martim Ventura	Husqvarna		1						25	
6	(Spain) Martí Escofet	KTM					2			20	
7	(South Africa) Hanno Geyser	KTM	2							20	
8	(Slovenia) Taj Karo	Husqvarna							3	16	
9	(Germany) Justin Gerlach	KTM						3		16	
10	(Germany) Lili-May Mansuy	Kove					3			16	
11	(United Kingdom) Benjamin Harvey-Grounds	Kove						4		13	
12	(Mexico) Mauricio Reynoso	Kove						5		11	
13	(France) Kévin Giroud	Yamaha					5			11	
	(Portugal) Tomás Paulo	Yamaha					Ret			0	
	(Spain) Edgar Canet	KTM				Ret				0	
	(Portugal) António Feliciano	Yamaha		Ret						0	
Pos	Rider	Manufacturer	SAU (Saudi Arabia)	OES (Portugal)	JOR (Jordan)	EXT (Spain)	ARA (Spain)	QAT (Qatar)	DUB (United Arab Emirates)	Points	Best Score

==== Veteran ====
Pos	Rider	Manufacturer	SAU (Saudi Arabia)	OES (Portugal)	JOR (Jordan)	EXT (Spain)	ARA (Spain)	QAT (Qatar)	DUB (United Arab Emirates)	Points	Best Score
1	(United Arab Emirates) Mohammed Al-Balooshi	Husqvarna	1		1					133	
1	(United Arab Emirates) Mohammed Al-Balooshi	KTM		4				1		133	
1	(United Arab Emirates) Mohammed Al-Balooshi	Fantic				2				133	
1	(United Arab Emirates) Mohammed Al-Balooshi	Yamaha							1	133	
2	(Lebanon) Rafic Eid	Gas Gas	2		2		2	2	2	129	116
2	(Lebanon) Rafic Eid	Honda		3		4				129	116
3	(Portugal) Jorge Brandão	KTM		1		1	1			75	
4	(United Arab Emirates) Sultan Al-Shanqiti	KTM		5	4	5	14	4	3	66	
5	(Portugal) Paulo Cardoso	Kawasaki		2		3	3			52	
6	(France) Frédéric Fontarosa	Kove	Ret		5					44	
6	(France) Frédéric Fontarosa	Honda		7			13			44	
6	(France) Frédéric Fontarosa	Husqvarna						8	4	44	
7	(United Kingdom) Barry Howe	Husqvarna	3		3					32	
8	(Australia) Andrew Houlihan	KTM						3		16	
9	(Japan) Yuji Kahara	Kove					4			13	
10	(United Kingdom) Stefan Mieczkowski	KTM	4					Ret		13	
11	(Poland) Jacek Bartoszek	Husqvarna							5	11	
12	(India) Jatin Jain	KTM						5		11	
13	(Australia) David Brock	KTM					5			11	
14	(Ecuador) Maria Taranto	Honda		6			15			11	
15	(Mexico) Ladislao Hernández	KTM						6		10	
16	(Portugal) Nuno Silva	KTM					6			10	
17	(Poland) Tomasz Dąbrowski	Kove							6	10	
18	(Canada) Matthew Glade	Husqvarna						7		9	
19	(Sweden) Martin Klyver	KTM					7			9	
20	(Switzerland) Dennis Mildenberger	KTM					8			8	
21	(Spain) Toni Vingut	Yamaha					9			7	
22	(France) Lionel Vericel	Gas Gas					10			6	
23	(Belgium) Patrick Butaye	KTM					11			5	
24	(Italy) Cesare Salvi	Kove					12			4	
	(United Kingdom) Steven Holt	Honda						Ret		0	
	(United Kingdom) Sławomir Sypień	KTM						Ret		0	
	(Australia) Matthew Roach	Husqvarna						Ret		0	
	(Croatia) Muhamed Pličaniċ	Yamaha						Ret		0	
	(Norway) Erik Myrberget	Husqvarna						Ret		0	
	(Poland) Norbert Świętochowski	Husqvarna						Ret		0	
	(France) Jeff Chetail	KTM					Ret			0	
Pos	Rider	Manufacturer	SAU (Saudi Arabia)	OES (Portugal)	JOR (Jordan)	EXT (Spain)	ARA (Spain)	QAT (Qatar)	DUB (United Arab Emirates)	Points	Best Score

==== Trail ====
Pos	Rider	Manufacturer	SAU (Saudi Arabia)	OES (Portugal)	JOR (Jordan)	EXT (Spain)	ARA (Spain)	QAT (Qatar)	DUB (United Arab Emirates)	Points	Best Score
1	(Italy) Alessandro Ruoso	Yamaha		2		1	1			70	
2	(Portugal) António Maio	Yamaha		1						25	
3	(Italy) Matteo Bottino	Kove					2			20	
4	(Spain) Julio López	Aprilia					3			16	
5	(Italy) Nicola Dutto	KTM					4			13	
Pos	Rider	Manufacturer	SAU (Saudi Arabia)	OES (Portugal)	JOR (Jordan)	EXT (Spain)	ARA (Spain)	QAT (Qatar)	DUB (United Arab Emirates)	Points	Best Score

==== SSVs ====
Pos	Rider	Manufacturer	SAU (Saudi Arabia)	OES (Portugal)	JOR (Jordan)	EXT (Spain)	ARA (Spain)	QAT (Qatar)	DUB (United Arab Emirates)	Points	Best Score
1											
Pos	Rider	Manufacturer	SAU (Saudi Arabia)	OES (Portugal)	JOR (Jordan)	EXT (Spain)	ARA (Spain)	QAT (Qatar)	DUB (United Arab Emirates)	Points	Best Score
