= 2023 FIM Bajas World Cup =

2023 FIM Bajas World Cup
Previous:	2022	Next:	2024

The 2023 FIM Bajas World Cup season is the 12th season of the FIM Bajas World Cup, an international rally raid competition for motorbikes, quads and SSVs.

== Calendar ==
The calendar for the 2023 season is scheduled to have eight rounds, with some of the events also being part of 2023 FIA World Cup for Cross-Country Bajas. The exact dates for the final rounds were confirmed in July.

Round	Dates	Rally name
1	2–4 February	(Saudi Arabia) Saudi Baja
2	16–18 March	Qatar International Baja
3	14–16 April	(Spain) Baja TT Dehesa Extremadura
4	21–23 July	(Spain) Baja Aragón
5	10–12 August	(Hungary) Hungarian Baja
6	6–8 October	(Portugal) Baja do Oeste
7	10–12 November	(United Arab Emirates) Dubai International Baja
8	23–25 November	Jordan Baja

== Regulations ==
The following classes and categories are included:

- Category 1: Bike (Up to 450cc single or twin cylinder, 2T or 4T)
- Category 2: Quads (three-wheel vehicles are forbidden)
- Category 3: SSV World Cup (Up to 1050cc)
- Class 1: Women World Cup
- Class 2: Junior World Cup
- Class 3: Veteran Trophy

The FIM will award the World Cup to both riders and manufacturers of the bike category; also to riders only in the quad, and SSV (driver and co-driver) categories, as well as to riders only in the woman, and junior classes. A Trophy is awarded to the winners of the veterans category. Any other category, i.e. “Over 450cc” do not count for any of the FIM Baja World Cups.

== Teams and riders ==
Bajas World Cup
Constructor	Team	Rider	Rounds
(Italy) Beta		(Australia) Martin Chalmers	1–2
(Italy) Beta		(Qatar) Abdulrahman Al Sheeb	1–2
(Italy) Beta		(United Kingdom) Luca Passone	2
(Austria) Husqvarna	SRG Motorsport	(United Arab Emirates) Abdulla Lanjawi	1–2
(Austria) Husqvarna	MX Ride Dubai	(Kuwait) Abdullah Al-Shatti	1–3
(Austria) Husqvarna	MX Ride Dubai	(United Arab Emirates) Sultan Al-Balooshi	2
(Austria) Husqvarna		(United Kingdom) Brett Hunt	1–2
(Austria) Husqvarna		(Qatar) Yaghoob Azadi	1
(Austria) Husqvarna		(Bahrain) Salman Farhan	2
(Austria) Husqvarna		(United Arab Emirates) Hamdan Aljahoushi	2
(Austria) Husqvarna		(United Kingdom) Michael Stokes	2
(Japan) Kawasaki	BP Ultimate Adventure Team	(Portugal) David Megre	3
(Austria) KTM	KTM Amman Darwazeh Motors	(Jordan) Abdullah Abu Aisheh	1
(Austria) KTM	MX Ride Dubai	(United Arab Emirates) Mohammed Al-Balooshi	1–3
(Austria) KTM	MX Ride Dubai	(United Arab Emirates) Sultan Al-Balooshi	1, 3
(Austria) KTM	MX Ride Dubai	(United Arab Emirates) Marwan Al-Rahmani	1–2
(Austria) KTM		(Saudi Arabia) Abdulhalim Al-Mughirah	1
(Austria) KTM	Saudi Dirtbike Center	(Saudi Arabia) Mishal Alghuneim	1–3
(Austria) KTM		(Saudi Arabia) Anas Alrhayani	1
(Austria) KTM		(Saudi Arabia) Ahmed Al Jaber	1
(Austria) KTM		(United Arab Emirates) Hamdan Alali	1–2
(Austria) KTM		(United Kingdom) Robert Wallace	2
(Austria) KTM	BAS World KTM Racing Team	(Italy) Paolo Lucci	2
(Austria) KTM		(South Africa) Michael Anderson	2
(Austria) KTM		(Slovenia) Simon Marčič	2
(Austria) KTM	Vendetta Racing UAE	(Republic of Ireland) Oran O'Kelly	2
(Austria) KTM		(New Zealand) Edward Lines	2
(Austria) KTM		(United Kingdom) Chris Hamer	2
(Austria) KTM		(United Kingdom) Andrew Seaton	2
(Austria) KTM		(Netherlands) Daniel Geerling	2
(France) Sherco		(Italy) Ottavio Missoni	2
(Japan) Suzuki		(Italy) Henry Favre	2
(Japan) Yamaha		(Lebanon) Ehab Al Hakeem	1–2
Women's Bajas World Cup
Constructor	Team	Rider	Rounds
(Italy) Beta	Saudi Dirtbike Center	(India) Sarah Kashyap	1
(Austria) Husqvarna	Duust Diverse Racing	(Kuwait) Sarah Khuraibet	1–3
(Austria) Husqvarna	Motorrad Indese	(Spain) Esther Merino	3
(Japan) Honda		(United Kingdom) Vanessa Ruck	2
(Austria) KTM		(Netherlands) Mirjam Pol	2–3
(Austria) KTM	Duust Diverse Racing	(Poland) Joanna Modrzewska	2
(Japan) Yamaha		(Spain) Sara García	3
Junior Bajas World Cup
Constructor	Team	Rider	Rounds
(Japan) Honda		(Canada) Jonathan Finn	1–3
(Austria) Husaberg		(Italy) Alessandro Iacovelli	2
(Austria) Husqvarna	Motozone Racing	(United Kingdom) Alex McInnes	1–2
(Austria) KTM	Duust Diverse Racing	(Poland) Konrad Dąbrowski	2
(Japan) Yamaha		(France) Kévin Giroud	3
Veteran Bajas World Cup
Constructor	Team	Rider	Rounds
(Italy) Fantic		(Belgium) Rafa Marques	3
(Austria) Gas Gas		(Qatar) Sheikh Mohamed Al Thani	1–2
(Japan) Honda		(Qatar) Mahanna Rashid Al-Naimi	1–2
(Japan) Honda		(Italy) Francesco Catanese	2
(Japan) Honda		(Portugal) Pedro Bianchi Prata	3
(Austria) Husqvarna		(Australia) Andrew Houlihan	1–3
(Austria) Husqvarna		(United Kingdom) Barry Howe	1–2
(Austria) Husqvarna		(Italy) Enrico Tanganelli	2
(Austria) KTM		(Netherlands) Gerard Lubbinge	1
(Austria) KTM		(Qatar) Mohamed Al-Kaabi	1–3
(Austria) KTM	Team Lucky Explorer	(Italy) Cesare Zacchetti	2
(Austria) KTM	Duust Diverse Racing	(Norway) Ola Fløene	2
(Austria) KTM		(Italy) Alberto Bertoldi	2
(Austria) KTM		(South Africa) Jaco Anderson	2
(Austria) KTM		(Italy) Elio Aglioli	2
(Austria) KTM		(Italy) Fabrizio Macchitella	2
(Japan) Yamaha		(United Arab Emirates) Mansoor Al-Suwaidi	2
Quad Bajas World Cup
Constructor	Team	Rider	Rounds
(Japan) Suzuki		(Belgium) Arnoud Dom	2
(Japan) Yamaha	Abu Dhabi Team	(United Arab Emirates) Abdulaziz Ahli	1–2
(Japan) Yamaha		(Saudi Arabia) Haitham Al-Tuwaijri	1–3
(Japan) Yamaha		(Saudi Arabia) Hani Al-Noumesi	1–3
(Japan) Yamaha		(United Arab Emirates) Mansoor Al-Suwaidi	2
(Japan) Yamaha		(Spain) Toni Vingut	3
(Japan) Yamaha		(France) Kévin Giroud	3
SSV Bajas World Cup
Constructor	Team	Rider	Rounds

== Results ==
=== Motorbikes ===
Round	Rally name	Podium finishers			
Round	Rally name	Rank	Rider	Bike	Time
1	(Saudi Arabia) Saudi Baja	1	(United Arab Emirates) Mohammed Al-Balooshi	KTM 450 Rally	5:43:30
1	(Saudi Arabia) Saudi Baja	2	(Australia) Martin Chalmers	Beta 450	6:05:34
1	(Saudi Arabia) Saudi Baja	3	(United Kingdom) Alex McInnes	Husqvarna FE450	6:12:06
2	Qatar International Baja	1	(Poland) Konrad Dąbrowski	KTM 450 Rally	7:22:09
2	Qatar International Baja	2	(United Kingdom) Robert Wallace	KTM 450 Rally	8:00:14
2	Qatar International Baja	3	(Netherlands) Mirjam Pol	KTM EXC 450R	8:43:18
3	(Spain) Baja TT Dehesa Extremadura	1			
3	(Spain) Baja TT Dehesa Extremadura	2			
3	(Spain) Baja TT Dehesa Extremadura	3			
4	(Spain) Baja Aragon	1			
4	(Spain) Baja Aragon	2			
4	(Spain) Baja Aragon	3			
5	(Hungary) Hungarian Baja	1			
5	(Hungary) Hungarian Baja	2			
5	(Hungary) Hungarian Baja	3			
6	(Portugal) Baja do Oeste	1			
6	(Portugal) Baja do Oeste	2			
6	(Portugal) Baja do Oeste	3			
7	Jordan Baja	1			
7	Jordan Baja	2			
7	Jordan Baja	3			
8	(United Arab Emirates) Dubai International Baja	1			
8	(United Arab Emirates) Dubai International Baja	2			
8	(United Arab Emirates) Dubai International Baja	3			

=== Quads ===
Round	Rally name	Podium finishers			
Round	Rally name	Rank	Rider	Bike	Time
1	(Saudi Arabia) Saudi Baja	1	(Saudi Arabia) Haitham Al-Tuwaijri	Yamaha Raptor 700	6:16:10
1	(Saudi Arabia) Saudi Baja	2	(United Arab Emirates) Abdulaziz Ahli	Yamaha Raptor 700	6:17:07
1	(Saudi Arabia) Saudi Baja	3	(Saudi Arabia) Hani Al-Noumesi	Yamaha Raptor 700	8:19:41
2	Qatar International Baja	1	(Belgium) Arnoud Dom	Suzuki LTR 450	10:46:34
2	Qatar International Baja	2	(United Arab Emirates) Mansoor Al-Suwaidi	Yamaha YFZ 450R	10:52:29
2	Qatar International Baja	3	(Saudi Arabia) Hani Al-Noumesi	Yamaha Raptor 700	16:08:38
3	(Spain) Baja TT Dehesa Extremadura	1			
3	(Spain) Baja TT Dehesa Extremadura	2			
3	(Spain) Baja TT Dehesa Extremadura	3			
4	(Spain) Baja Aragon	1			
4	(Spain) Baja Aragon	2			
4	(Spain) Baja Aragon	3			
5	(Hungary) Hungarian Baja	1			
5	(Hungary) Hungarian Baja	2			
5	(Hungary) Hungarian Baja	3			
6	(Portugal) Baja do Oeste	1			
6	(Portugal) Baja do Oeste	2			
6	(Portugal) Baja do Oeste	3			
7	Jordan Baja	1			
7	Jordan Baja	2			
7	Jordan Baja	3			
8	(United Arab Emirates) Dubai International Baja	1			
8	(United Arab Emirates) Dubai International Baja	2			
8	(United Arab Emirates) Dubai International Baja	3			

=== SSVs ===
Round	Rally name	Podium finishers			
Round	Rally name	Rank	Rider	Bike	Time
2	Qatar International Baja	1			
2	Qatar International Baja	2			
2	Qatar International Baja	3			
3	(Spain) Baja TT Dehesa Extremadura	1			
3	(Spain) Baja TT Dehesa Extremadura	2			
3	(Spain) Baja TT Dehesa Extremadura	3			
4	(Spain) Baja Aragon	1			
4	(Spain) Baja Aragon	2			
4	(Spain) Baja Aragon	3			
5	(Hungary) Hungarian Baja	1			
5	(Hungary) Hungarian Baja	2			
5	(Hungary) Hungarian Baja	3			
6	(Portugal) Baja do Oeste	1			
6	(Portugal) Baja do Oeste	2			
6	(Portugal) Baja do Oeste	3			
7	Jordan Baja	1			
7	Jordan Baja	2			
7	Jordan Baja	3			
8	(United Arab Emirates) Dubai International Baja	1			
8	(United Arab Emirates) Dubai International Baja	2			
8	(United Arab Emirates) Dubai International Baja	3			

== Championship standings ==
=== Riders' championship ===
- Points for final positions are awarded as follows:

Position	1st	2nd	3rd	4th	5th	6th	7th	8th	9th	10th	11th	12th	13th	14th	15th+
Points	25	20	16	13	11	10	9	8	7	6	5	4	3	2	1

A rider's best six results will count towards their final position in the final standings.

==== Motorbikes ====
Pos	Rider	Manufacturer	SAU (Saudi Arabia)	QAT (Qatar)	EXT (Spain)	ARA (Spain)	HUN (Hungary)	OES (Portugal)	JOR (Jordan)	DUB (United Arab Emirates)	Points	Best Score
1	(United Arab Emirates) Mohammed Al-Balooshi	KTM	1^{25}	7^{9}							34	
2	(Poland) Konrad Dąbrowski	KTM		1^{25}							25	
3	(Canada) Jonathan Thomas Finn	Honda	4^{13}	6^{10}							23	
4	(United Kingdom) Alex McInnes	Husqvarna	3^{16}	10^{6}							22	
5	(United Kingdom) Robert Wallace	KTM		2^{20}							20	
6	(Australia) Andrew Houlihan	Husqvarna	9^{7}	4^{13}							20	
7	(Australia) Martin Chalmers	Beta	2^{20}	Ret							20	
8	(Netherlands) Mirjam Pol	KTM		3^{16}							16	
9	(Saudi Arabia) Mishal Alghuneim	KTM	5^{11}	13^{3}							14	
10	(Kuwait) Abdullah Al-Shatti	Husqvarna	11^{5}	9^{7}							12	
11	(United Arab Emirates) Marwan Al Rahmani	KTM	Ret	5^{11}							11	
12	(United Arab Emirates) Hamdan Al-Ali	Husqvarna	7^{9}	23^{1}							10	
13	(Jordan) Abdullah Abu Aisheh	KTM	6^{10}								10	
14	(United Kingdom) Brett Hunt	Husqvarna	8^{8}	24^{1}							9	
15	(Italy) Cesare Zacchetti	KTM		8^{8}							8	
16	(United Arab Emirates) Abdulla Lanjawi	Husqvarna	12^{4}	12^{4}							8	
17	(United Arab Emirates) Sultan Al-Balooshi	KTM	10^{6}	Ret							6	
18	(Norway) Ola Fløene	KTM		11^{5}							5	
19	(Lebanon) Ehab Al Hakeem	Yamaha	13^{3}	16^{1}							4	
20	(Slovenia) Simon Marčič	KTM		14^{2}							2	
21	(Kuwait) Sarah Khuraibet	Husqvarna	17^{1}	27^{1}							2	
22	(Qatar) Mohamed Al Kaabi	KTM	18^{1}	30^{1}							2	
23	(United Kingdom) Barry Howe	KTM	14^{2}	Ret							2	
24	(Republic of Ireland) Oran O'Kelly	KTM		15^{1}							1	
25	(South Africa) Jaco Anderson	KTM		17^{1}							1	
26	(Italy) Ottavio Missoni	Sherco		18^{1}							1	
27	(United Kingdom) Chris Hamer	KTM		19^{1}							1	
28	(Italy) Francesco Catanese	Honda		20^{1}							1	
29	(Italy) Alberto Bertoldi	KTM		21^{1}							1	
30	(Qatar) Sheikh Mohamed Al Thani	Gas Gas	Ret	22^{1}							1	
31	(Bahrain) Salman Farhan	Husqvarna		25^{1}							1	
32	(Poland) Joanna Modrzewska	KTM		26^{1}							1	
33	(United Kingdom) Andrew Seaton	KTM		28^{1}							1	
34	(United Kingdom) Vanessa Ruck	Honda		29^{1}							1	
35	(New Zealand) Edward Lines	KTM		31^{1}							1	
36	(Italy) Elio Aglioni	KTM		32^{1}							1	
37	(United Kingdom) Michael Stokes	Husqvarna		33^{1}							1	
38	(United Kingdom) Luca Passone	Beta		34^{1}							1	
39	(United Arab Emirates) Hamdan Aljahoushi	Husqvarna		35^{1}							1	
40	(Qatar) Yaghoob Azadi	Husqvarna	15^{1}								1	
41	(Qatar) Abdulrahman Al Sheeb	Beta	16^{1}	Ret							1	
42	(Qatar) Mahanna Rashid Al-Naimi	Honda	19^{1}	Ret							1	
	(Netherlands) Daniel Geerling	KTM		Ret							0	
	(Italy) Fabrizio Macchitella	KTM		Ret							0	
	(Italy) Henry Favre	Suzuki		Ret							0	
	(Italy) Alessandro Iacovelli	Husaberg		Ret							0	
	(Italy) Paolo Lucci	KTM		Ret							0	
	(Italy) Enrico Tanganelli	Husqvarna		Ret							0	
	(South Africa) Michael Anderson	KTM		Ret							0	
	(Saudi Arabia) Anas Alrhayani	KTM	Ret								0	
	(Saudi Arabia) Abdulhalim Al-Mughirah	KTM	Ret								0	
	(Saudi Arabia) Ahmed Al Jaber	KTM	Ret								0	
	(Netherlands) Gerard Lubbinge	KTM	Ret								0	
	(India) Sarah Kashyap	Beta	Ret								0	
Pos	Rider	Manufacturer	SAU (Saudi Arabia)	QAT (Qatar)	EXT (Spain)	ARA (Spain)	HUN (Hungary)	OES (Portugal)	JOR (Jordan)	DUB (United Arab Emirates)	Points	Best Score

==== Quads ====
Pos	Rider	Manufacturer	SAU (Saudi Arabia)	QAT (Qatar)	EXT (Spain)	ARA (Spain)	HUN (Hungary)	OES (Portugal)	JOR (Jordan)	DUB (United Arab Emirates)	Points	Best Score
1	(Saudi Arabia) Hani Al-Noumesi	Yamaha	3^{16}	3^{16}							32	
2	(Belgium) Arnoud Dom	Suzuki		1^{25}							25	
3	(Saudi Arabia) Haitham Al-Tuwaijri	Yamaha	1^{25}	Ret							25	
4	(United Arab Emirates) Mansoor Al-Suwaidi	Yamaha		2^{20}							20	
5	(United Arab Emirates) Abdulaziz Ahli	Yamaha	2^{20}	Ret							20	
Pos	Rider	Manufacturer	SAU (Saudi Arabia)	QAT (Qatar)	EXT (Spain)	ARA (Spain)	HUN (Hungary)	OES (Portugal)	JOR (Jordan)	DUB (United Arab Emirates)	Points	Best Score

==== Women ====
Pos	Rider	Manufacturer	SAU (Saudi Arabia)	QAT (Qatar)	EXT (Spain)	ARA (Spain)	HUN (Hungary)	OES (Portugal)	JOR (Jordan)	DUB (United Arab Emirates)	Points	Best Score
1	(Kuwait) Sarah Khuraibet	Husqvarna	1^{25}	3^{16}							41	
2	(Netherlands) Mirjam Pol	KTM		1^{25}							25	
3	(Poland) Joanna Modrzewska	KTM		2^{20}							25	
4	(United Kingdom) Vanessa Ruck	Honda		4^{13}							13	
	(India) Sarah Kashyap	Beta	Ret								0	
Pos	Rider	Manufacturer	SAU (Saudi Arabia)	QAT (Qatar)	EXT (Spain)	ARA (Spain)	HUN (Hungary)	OES (Portugal)	JOR (Jordan)	DUB (United Arab Emirates)	Points	Best Score

==== Junior ====
Pos	Rider	Manufacturer	SAU (Saudi Arabia)	QAT (Qatar)	EXT (Spain)	ARA (Spain)	HUN (Hungary)	OES (Portugal)	JOR (Jordan)	DUB (United Arab Emirates)	Points	Best Score
1	(United Kingdom) Alex McInnes	Husqvarna	1^{25}	3^{16}							41	
2	(Canada) Jonathan Thomas Finn	Honda	2^{20}	2^{20}							40	
3	(Poland) Konrad Dąbrowski	KTM		1^{25}							25	
	(Italy) Alessandro Iacovelli	Husaberg		Ret							0	
Pos	Rider	Manufacturer	SAU (Saudi Arabia)	QAT (Qatar)	EXT (Spain)	ARA (Spain)	HUN (Hungary)	OES (Portugal)	JOR (Jordan)	DUB (United Arab Emirates)	Points	Best Score

==== Veteran ====
Pos	Rider	Manufacturer	SAU (Saudi Arabia)	QAT (Qatar)	EXT (Spain)	ARA (Spain)	HUN (Hungary)	OES (Portugal)	JOR (Jordan)	DUB (United Arab Emirates)	Points	Best Score
1	(Australia) Andrew Houlihan	Husqvarna	1^{25}	1^{25}							50	
2	(Qatar) Mohamed Al Kaabi	KTM	3^{16}	9^{7}							23	
3	(Italy) Cesare Zacchetti	KTM		2^{20}							20	
4	(United Kingdom) Barry Howe	Husqvarna	2^{20}	Ret							20	
5	(Norway) Ola Fløene	KTM		3^{16}							16	
6	(South Africa) Jaco Anderson	KTM		4^{13}							13	
7	(Qatar) Mahanna Rashid Al-Naimi	Honda	4^{13}	Ret							13	
8	(Italy) Francesco Catanese	Honda		5^{11}							11	
9	(Italy) Alberto Bertoldi	KTM		6^{10}							10	
10	(Qatar) Sheikh Mohamed Al Thani	Gas Gas	Ret	7^{9}							9	
11	(United Arab Emirates) Mansoor Al-Suwaidi	Yamaha		8^{8}							8	
12	(Italy) Elio Aglioni	Yamaha		10^{6}							6	
	(Italy) Fabrizio Macchitella	KTM		Ret							0	
	(Italy) Enrico Tanganelli	Husqvarna		Ret							0	
	(Netherlands) Gerard Lubbinge	KTM	Ret								0	
Pos	Rider	Manufacturer	SAU (Saudi Arabia)	QAT (Qatar)	EXT (Spain)	ARA (Spain)	HUN (Hungary)	OES (Portugal)	JOR (Jordan)	DUB (United Arab Emirates)	Points	Best Score

==== SSVs ====
Pos	Rider	Manufacturer	SAU (Saudi Arabia)	QAT (Qatar)	EXT (Spain)	ARA (Spain)	HUN (Hungary)	OES (Portugal)	JOR (Jordan)	DUB (United Arab Emirates)	Points	Best Score
1												
Pos	Rider	Manufacturer	SAU (Saudi Arabia)	QAT (Qatar)	EXT (Spain)	ARA (Spain)	HUN (Hungary)	OES (Portugal)	JOR (Jordan)	DUB (United Arab Emirates)	Points	Best Score

=== Manufacturers Championship ===
- Points for manufacturers are awarded by the points of the top two riders per manufacturer at each baja being added together:

Pos	Manufacturer	SAU (Saudi Arabia)	QAT (Qatar)	EXT (Spain)	ARA (Spain)	HUN (Hungary)	OES (Portugal)	JOR (Jordan)	DUB (United Arab Emirates)	Points	Best Score
1	KTM	36	45							81	
2	Husqvarna	24	20							44	
3	Honda	14	11							25	
4	Beta	21	1							21	
5	Yamaha	3	1							4	
6	Gas Gas	0	1							0	
7	Sherco		1							1	
	Suzuki		0							0	
	Husaberg		0							0	
Pos	Manufacturer	SAU (Saudi Arabia)	QAT (Qatar)	EXT (Spain)	ARA (Spain)	HUN (Hungary)	OES (Portugal)	JOR (Jordan)	DUB (United Arab Emirates)	Points	Best Score
