= 2024 FIA World Baja Cup =

2024 FIA World Baja Cup
Previous:	2023	Next:	2025

The 2024 FIA World Baja Cup is the 6th season of the FIA World Baja Cup, an annual competition for baja rally events for cars, buggies, and side-by-sides held in multiple countries.

== Events ==
Previously known as the FIA World Cup for Cross-Country Bajas, the 2024 FIA World Baja Cup are featured eight rounds, designed in alignment with the FIA World Rally-Raid Championship (W2RC). This coordination ensures no scheduling conflicts and offers participants a varied calendar of demanding events on diverse terrains.

The 2024 schedule includes four European events and four Middle Eastern rounds. The season kicks off in early February with the Saudi Baja in the An-Nafud desert near Hail. It then moves to Europe, where Greece, Spain, Poland, and Portugal host rounds in May, July, August, and October. The competition wraps up with three Middle Eastern events in Qatar, Jordan, and the UAE between late October and November.

This year marks Baja Greece's promotion from the FIA European Baja Cup to a full championship round, while the Qatar event shifts from March to late October.

Each World Baja Cup event spans up to four days, including two competitive days and at least 350 kilometers of timed sections. Titles will be awarded across various categories, including drivers, co-drivers, teams, challenger drivers, SSV drivers, and SSV teams.

== Calendar ==
Round	Dates	Rally name
1	8–10 February	(Saudi Arabia) Saudi Baja
2	22–25 May	Baja Greece
3	26–28 July	(Spain) Baja España Aragón
4	22–25 August	Baja Poland
5	17–19 October	(Portugal) Baja Portalegre 500
6	30 October – 02 November	Qatar International Baja
7	14–16 November	Jordan Baja
8	28 November – 01 December	(United Arab Emirates) Dubai International Baja

== Results ==
=== World Drivers' championship ===
The driver who records a points-scoring classification would be taken into account for the championship regardless of the categories.

Pos.	Driver	SAU (Saudi Arabia)	GRE (Greece)	ARA (Spain)	POL (Poland)	PRT (Portugal)	QAT (Qatar)	JOR (Jordan)	DUB (United Arab Emirates)	Points
1	(Portugal) João Ferreira	2^{33}	11^{19}	5^{33}	1^{40}	1^{40}	2^{40}	2^{40}	1^{38}	283
2	(Argentina) Fernando Alvarez	6^{40}	4^{40}	13^{26}	6^{47}	4^{31}	6^{26}	6^{26}	6^{39}	275
3	(Spain) Eduardo Pons		1^{38}	6^{24}	4^{33}	3^{38}	11^{21}	5^{33}	4^{39}	226
4	(Spain) Diego Martinez	7^{33}	7^{31}	9^{17}	8^{25}	10^{2}	9^{28}	7^{26}	7^{32}	194
5	(Portugal) João Dias	5^{40}		7^{30}		8^{25}	3^{33}	3^{33}	10^{28}	189
Pos.	Driver	SAU (Saudi Arabia)	GRE (Greece)	ARA (Spain)	POL (Poland)	PRT (Portugal)	QAT (Qatar)	JOR (Jordan)	DUB (United Arab Emirates)	Points
