= Dubai International Baja =

International baja rally event in Dubai

The Dubai International Baja (formerly known as the Dubai International Rally) is an international baja rally event based in Dubai held around the facilities of the Dubai Innovation Centre.

== History ==
The rally, a gravel and sand event, dates back to 1984 and it used to be the final event of the Middle East Rally Championship each year. The rally changed its name to the Emirates Rally in 1989 but changed back the following year.

In 2016 the rally was reformatted into a cross-country rally and hosted a candidate event for the FIM Bajas World Cup and FIA World Baja Cup. In 2017, the rally became an official event, hosting competition in both the car and bike categories.

The rally has been dominated in the car category by Emirati driver Mohammed bin Sulayem who has claimed 15 victories including twelve consecutive wins from 1991 to 2002. Eleven wins have been taken by Qatari driver Nasser Al-Attiyah, including a run of eight straight from 2007 to 2014.

== Winners ==
=== Auto ===
List of winners sourced in part from:

| Year | Driver | Codriver | Car |
|---|---|---|---|
| 1982 | (United Kingdom) Chris Walles | (United Kingdom) Steve McCormack | Datsun Silvia |
| 1983 | (United Kingdom) Chris Walles | (United Kingdom) Steve McCormack | Datsun Silvia |
| 1984 | (Qatar) Saeed Al-Hajri | (United Kingdom) John Spiller | Porsche 911 SC |
| 1985 | (United Arab Emirates) Mohammed bin Sulayem | (United Arab Emirates) Ali Hassan | Toyota Celica TCT |
| 1986 | (United Arab Emirates) Mohammed bin Sulayem | (Sweden) Sölve Andreasson | Toyota Celica TCT |
| 1987 | (West Germany) Reinhard Hainbach | (West Germany) Erhard Ricken | Opel Manta 400 |
| 1988 | (United Arab Emirates) Mohammed bin Sulayem | (Republic of Ireland) Ronan Morgan | Toyota Celica TCT |
| 1989 | (Sweden) Björn Waldegård | (United Kingdom) Fred Gallagher | Toyota Celica GT-Four |
| 1990 | (United Arab Emirates) Suhail Bin Khalifa Al Maktoum | (Qatar) Mubarak Al Hajri | Mitsubishi Galant VR-4 |
| 1991 | (United Arab Emirates) Mohammed bin Sulayem | (Republic of Ireland) Ronan Morgan | Toyota Celica GT-Four |
| 1992 | (United Arab Emirates) Mohammed bin Sulayem | (Republic of Ireland) Ronan Morgan | Toyota Celica GT-Four |
| 1993 | (United Arab Emirates) Mohammed bin Sulayem | (Republic of Ireland) Ronan Morgan | Ford Escort RS Cosworth |
| 1994 | (United Arab Emirates) Mohammed bin Sulayem | (Republic of Ireland) Ronan Morgan | Ford Escort RS Cosworth |
| 1995 | (United Arab Emirates) Mohammed bin Sulayem | (Republic of Ireland) Ronan Morgan | Ford Escort RS Cosworth |
| 1996 | (United Arab Emirates) Mohammed bin Sulayem | (Republic of Ireland) Ronan Morgan | Ford Escort RS Cosworth |
| 1997 | (United Arab Emirates) Mohammed bin Sulayem | (Republic of Ireland) Ronan Morgan | Ford Escort RS Cosworth |
| 1998 | (United Arab Emirates) Mohammed bin Sulayem | (Republic of Ireland) Ronan Morgan | Ford Escort WRC |
| 1999 | (United Arab Emirates) Mohammed bin Sulayem | (Republic of Ireland) Ronan Morgan | Ford Focus WRC |
| 2000 | (United Arab Emirates) Mohammed bin Sulayem | (Republic of Ireland) Ronan Morgan | Ford Focus WRC |
| 2001 | (United Arab Emirates) Mohammed bin Sulayem | (Jordan) Khaled Zakaria | Ford Focus WRC |
| 2002 | (United Arab Emirates) Mohammed bin Sulayem | (United Kingdom) John Spiller | Ford Focus WRC |
| 2003 | (Qatar) Nasser Al-Attiyah | (United Kingdom) Steve Lancaster | Subaru Impreza WRC |
| 2004 | (Qatar) Nasser Al-Attiyah | (United Kingdom) Chris Patterson | Subaru Impreza WRX STi |
| 2005 | (United Arab Emirates) Khalid Al-Qassimi | (United Kingdom) Nick Beech | Subaru Impreza WRX STi |
| 2006 | (United Arab Emirates) Khalid Al-Qassimi | (United Arab Emirates) Khalid Alkendi | Subaru Impreza WRX STi |
| 2007 | (Qatar) Nasser Al-Attiyah | (United Kingdom) Chris Patterson | Subaru Impreza WRX STi |
| 2008 | (Qatar) Nasser Al-Attiyah | (United Kingdom) Chris Patterson | Subaru Impreza WRX STi |
| 2009 | (Qatar) Nasser Al-Attiyah | (Italy) Giovanni Bernacchini | Subaru Impreza WRX STi |
| 2010 | (Qatar) Nasser Al-Attiyah | (Italy) Giovanni Bernacchini | Ford Fiesta S2000 |
| 2011 | (Qatar) Nasser Al-Attiyah | (Italy) Giovanni Bernacchini | Ford Fiesta S2000 |
| 2012 | (Qatar) Nasser Al-Attiyah | (Italy) Giovanni Bernacchini | Ford Fiesta S2000 |
| 2013 | (Qatar) Nasser Al-Attiyah | (Italy) Giovanni Bernacchini | Ford Fiesta S2000 |
| 2014 | (Qatar) Nasser Al-Attiyah | (Italy) Giovanni Bernacchini | Ford Fiesta RRC |
| 2015 | (United Arab Emirates) Khalid Al-Qassimi | (United Kingdom) Chris Patterson | Citroen DS3 RRC |
| 2016 | (United Arab Emirates) Ahmed Al Maqoodi | None | Polaris RZR 1000 (T3) |
| 2017 | (Qatar) Nasser Al-Attiyah | (France) Mathieu Baumel | Toyota Hilux |
| 2018 | (Poland) Jakub Przygoński | (Belgium) Tom Colsoul | Mini John Cooper Works Buggy |
| 2019 | (Poland) Jakub Przygoński | (Germany) Timo Gottschalk | Mini John Cooper Works Buggy |
| 2020 | Cancelled due to COVID-19 pandemic | | |
| 2021 | (Saudi Arabia) Yazeed Al Rajhi | (United Kingdom) Michael Orr | Toyota Hilux Overdrive |
| 2022 | (Saudi Arabia) Yazeed Al Rajhi | (Germany) Dirk von Zitzewitz | Toyota Hilux Overdrive |
| 2023 | (Qatar) Nasser Al-Attiyah | (Andorra) Mathieu Baumel | BRX Prodrive Hunter T1+ |
| 2024 | (Qatar) Nasser Al-Attiyah | (Spain) Pablo Moreno | Taurus T3 Max |
| 2025 | (Argentina) Juan Cruz Yacopini | (Spain) Daniel Oliveras | Toyota IMT Hilux |

=== Bikes & Quads ===
| Year | Bike | | Quad | |
| Year | Rider | Vehicle | Rider | Vehicle |
|---|---|---|---|---|
| 2016 | (United Kingdom) David McBride | KTM 450 RR | (Saudi Arabia) Abdulmajeed Al Khulaifi | Yamaha YFZ 450 |
| 2017 | (South Africa) Mark Ackerman | Husvqarna 450 FX | (Kuwait) Fahad Al Musallam | Yamaha 700 Raptor |
| 2018 | (United Arab Emirates) Mohammed Al Balooshi | KTM 450 | (Kuwait) Fahad Al Musallam | Yamaha 700 Raptor |
| 2019 | (South Africa) Aaron Mare | Husvqarna 450 FC | (United Arab Emirates) Khalifa Al Raisee | Honda 700 TRX2 |
| 2020 | Cancelled due to COVID-19 pandemic | | | |
| 2021 | (United Kingdom) Sam Smith | KTM 450SX-F | (Saudi Arabia) Haitham Altuwayjiri | Yamaha YZF450R |
| 2022 | (Austria) Tobias Ebster | Husqvarna FE 450 | (United Arab Emirates) Abdulaziz Ahli | Yamaha YZF450R |
| 2023 | (United Arab Emirates) Mohammed Al-Balooshi | Yamaha MX450 | (United Arab Emirates) Abdulaziz Ahli | Yamaha |
| 2024 | (Poland) Konrad Dąbrowski | KTM 450 Rally | (United Arab Emirates) Abdulaziz Ahli | Yamaha Raptor 700 |
| 2025 | (Poland) Konrad Dąbrowski | KTM 450 Rally | (United Arab Emirates) Abdulaziz Ahli | Yamaha Raptor 700 |
