= Jordan Baja =

- Category: Rally raid
- Region: Wadi Rum, Jordan
- Inaugural season: 2018
- Drivers' champion: (Argentina) Juan Cruz Yacopini (Cars) (United Arab Emirates) Mohammed Al-Balooshi (Bikes) (Saudi Arabia) Hani Al-Noumesi (Quads)
- Official website: jordanrally.com

The Jordan Baja is an international baja rally event held in the Wadi Rum desert in Jordan. The event had the status of a World Cup Baja round in 2021 for both FIA and FIM championships. Jordan Baja had 559 competitive kilometres in a total route of 859 km for 2021 with 15 motorcycles and five quads in fray in the near-by deserts of Wadi Rum. Competitors from 15 nations took part in the fourth round of the FIA World Cup for Cross-Country Bajas, Round 2 of the FIM Bajas World Cup and a National Baja was also held along with the two international-status events.

== History ==
The event was organised for the first time in 2018, becoming an official event of the FIA World Cup for Cross-Country Bajas in 2019.

After its cancellation in 2020 due to the COVID-19 pandemic, the rally returned to the FIA calendar in 2021. The 2023 race was cancelled shortly after the outbreak of the Gaza war.

== Winners ==
=== Auto ===
Year	Driver & Codriver	Car	Applicability	Ref
2018	(Saudi Arabia) Essa Al-Dossary (United Arab Emirates) Ali Obaid	Nissan Navara	National	
2019	(Poland) Jakub Przygoński (Germany) Timo Gottschalk	Mini All 4 Racing	FIA World Cup for Cross-Country Bajas	
2020	Cancelled due to COVID-19 pandemic			
2021	(Saudi Arabia) Yasir Seaidan (Russia) Alexey Kuzmich	Mini John Cooper Works Rally	FIA World Cup for Cross-Country Bajas	
2022	(Saudi Arabia) Saleh Al-Saif (Russia) Egor Okhotnikov	BRP Can Am Maverick X3 XRS	FIA World Cup for Cross-Country Bajas	
2023	Cancelled due to Gaza war			
2024	(United Arab Emirates) Khalid Al-Jafla (Russia) Andrey Rudnitskiy	Taurus T3 Max	FIA World Cup for Cross-Country Bajas	
2025	(Argentina) Juan Cruz Yacopini (Spain) Dani Oliveras	Toyota Hilux Overdrive Evo	FIA World Cup for Cross-Country Bajas	
2026	(South Africa) Saood Variawa (France) François Cazalet	Toyota Hilux IMT Evo 26'	FIA World Cup for Cross-Country Bajas	

=== Moto & Quad ===
Year	Moto		Quad	
Year	Rider	Vehicle	Rider	Vehicle
2018	(Jordan) Ata Al-Hmoud	Beta 390	N/A	
2019	(United Arab Emirates) Mohammed Al Balooshi	KTM 450 Rally	N/A	
2020	Cancelled due to COVID-19 pandemic			
2021	(United Arab Emirates) Mohammed Al Balooshi	Husqvarna FC450	(Saudi Arabia) Faisal Al-Suwayh	Yamaha YZF450R
2022	(United Arab Emirates) Mohammed Al Balooshi	KTM 450	(Saudi Arabia) Abdalmajeed Al-Khulaifi	Yamaha Raptor
2023	Cancelled due to Gaza war			
2024	(United Arab Emirates) Mohammed Al-Balooshi	KTM 450	(Saudi Arabia) Abdelaziz Al-Sheibani	Yamaha Raptor
2025	(United Arab Emirates) Mohammed Al-Balooshi	Husqvarna FR 450	(Saudi Arabia) Hani Al-Noumesi	Yamaha Raptor
2026	(United Kingdom) Alex McInnes	KTM 450 SX-F	(Saudi Arabia) Hani Al-Noumesi	Yamaha Raptor
