= FIM Bajas World Cup =

Championship of baja rally raid racing

- Category: Rally raid
- Country: International
- Inaugural season: 2012
- Riders' champion: (United Kingdom) Alex McInnes (moto) (Saudi Arabia) Hani Al-Noumesi (quad)
- Official website: Official website

The FIM Bajas World Cup is the premier championship of baja-style rally raid racing, organized by the Fédération Internationale de Motocyclisme (FIM) since 2012. Along with the main world cup for 450cc, there are world cups for the following categories: Quads, Women, and Junior. Unlike the much longer cross-country rallies, cross-country bajas generally take place in 2–3 days. As is the case with rally raid events the stages are long and arduous testing the skill and endurance of the riders.

The FIM Cross-Country Rallies World Championship was the premier championship for the longer cross-country rallies. From the 2022 season, the Bajas World Cup runs alongside the World Rally-Raid Championship together with the FIA World Baja Cup.

== Winners ==
| Season | Rider (moto) | Women (moto) | Rider (quad) | Driver (SSV) |
World Cup
| 2012 | (San Marino) Alessandro Zanotti (KTM) | (France) Emmanuelle Clair (Yamaha) | (Spain) Jose Luis Espinosa Garcia (Can-Am) | N/A |
| 2013 | (Italy) Alessandro Ruoso (Yamaha) | (Germany) Andrea Mayer (Yamaha) | (Poland) Kamil Wisniewski (Yamaha) | N/A |
| 2014 | (Italy) Alessandro Ruoso (Yamaha) | (Portugal) Rita Vieira (AJP) | (Poland) Kamil Wisniewski (Yamaha) | N/A |
| 2015 | (France) Adrien Maré (KTM) | (Portugal) Rita Vieira (Honda) | (France) Alexandre Giroud (Yamaha) | N/A |
| 2016 | (France) Xavier De Soultrait (Yamaha) | (France) Emmanuelle Clair (Yamaha) | (Italy) Amerigo Ventura Montecamozzo (Yamaha) | N/A |
| 2017 | (Italy) Alessandro Ruoso (Yamaha) | (Spain) Sara García (Yamaha) | (Portugal) Arnaldo Martins (Suzuki) | N/A |
| 2018 | (United Arab Emirates) Mohammed Al Balooshi (KTM) | (Czech Republic) Olga Roučková (Yamaha) | (Portugal) Arnaldo Martins (Suzuki) | N/A |
| 2019 | (France) Benjamin Melot (KTM) | (India) Aishwarya Pissay (Yamaha) | (Russia) Aleksandr Maksimov (Yamaha) | N/A |
| 2020 | (Germany) Sebastian Bühler (Hero) | (Brazil) Janaína De Souza (Honda) | (Spain) Toni Vingut (Yamaha) | (Portugal) João Dias (Can-Am) |
| 2021 | (Czech Republic) Martin Michek (KTM) | (Netherlands) Mirjam Pol (Husqvarna) | (Saudi Arabia) Haitham Al-Tuwayjri (Yamaha) | (Portugal) Alexandre Pinto (Can-Am) |
| 2022 | (Poland) Konrad Dąbrowski (Husqvarna) | (Netherlands) Mirjam Pol (Husqvarna) | (Saudi Arabia) Abdalmajeed Al-Khulaifi (Yamaha) | (Portugal) João Dias |
| 2023 | (United Arab Emirates) Mohammed Al-Balooshi (KTM) | (Spain) Esther Merino García (Husqvarna) | (France) Kevin Giroud (Yamaha) | N/A |
| 2024 | (United Arab Emirates) Mohammed Al-Balooshi (KTM) | (Poland) Joanna Modrzewska (Husqvarna) | (Saudi Arabia) Hani Al-Noumesi (Yamaha) | N/A |
| 2025 | (United Arab Emirates) Mohammed Al-Balooshi (KTM) | (Israel) Alona Ben Natan (GasGas) | (Saudi Arabia) Hani Al-Noumesi (Yamaha) | N/A |
| 2026 | (United Kingdom) Alex McInnes (KTM) | (Poland) Joanna Modrzewska (Triumph) | (Saudi Arabia) Hani Al-Noumesi (Yamaha) | N/A |
