= Baja Aragón =

Coordinates: 41°04′49″N 0°11′30″W

The Baja España Aragón, also known as the Baja Aragón or Spanish Baja, is a baja rally event held in the region of Aragón in northern Spain.

As of 2026, it is part of the FIA World Baja Cup, FIA European Baja Cup, and FIM Bajas World Cup schedules as well as the Spanish Cross-Country Rally Championship.

== History ==
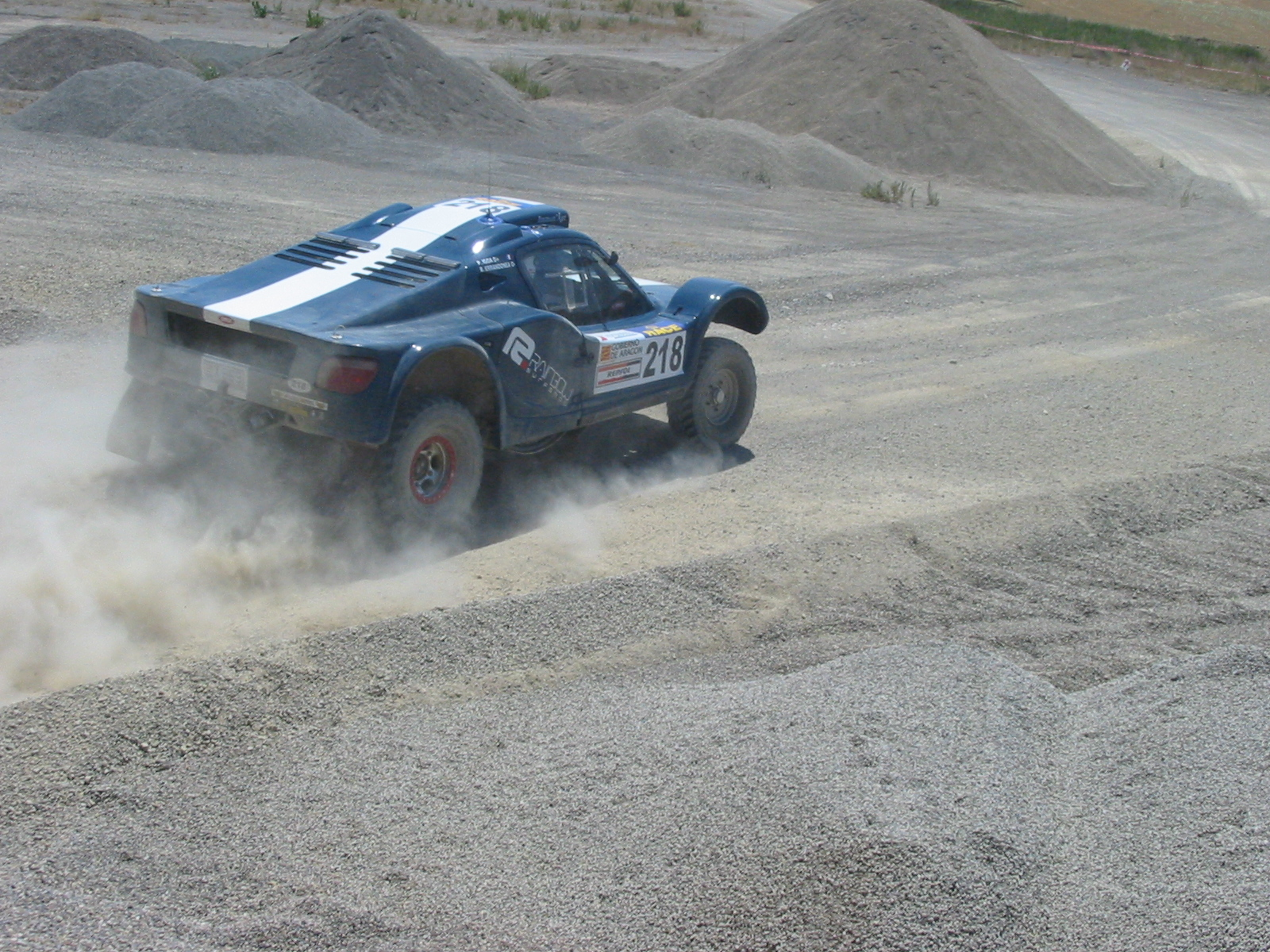
Bernard Errandonea racing in the 2005 Baja Aragón

This event was launched in 1983, based on the popularity of the African Adventure rallies, such as the Dakar Rally and the Pharaons Rally. The event's creators, a group of French and Spanish enthusiasts, chose the desert of Monegros because of the scenery and availability of service infrastructure in Zaragoza. The first baja in Spain was called the Baja Montesblancos.

In 1992, the Spanish Baja was cancelled, as it coincided with the Summer Olympics in Barcelona. After this, the Spanish Automobile Federation took over the organisation, and entered it into the FIA Cross Country Rally World Cup.

The COVID-19 pandemic forced the 2020 race to be called off.

The 2026 edition was postponed from its usual late July slot to September due to wildfires across Spain.

== Winners ==
	Car			Bike		Ref
Year	Driver	Co-driver	Car	Rider	Bike	Ref
1983	(France) Jean-Jacques Rate	(Spain) S. Charrier	Toyota	(France) Poli (France) Audoard	Yamaha	
1984	(France) Raoul Raymondis	(France) J. Pastorello	Range Rover	(France) Serge Bacou (United States) Chuck Stearns	Yamaha	
1985	(France) Pierre Lartigue	(France) Bernard Giroux	Lada	(France) Chavanette (France) Morales	KTM	
1986	(France) Jean Da Silva	(France) Hubert Rigal	Mitsubishi	(France) Locroix (France) Neels Theric	Honda	
1987	(France) Jean Da Silva	(France) Hubert Rigal	Mitsubishi	(Spain) Carlos Mas (Spain) Ferran Gil	Yamaha	
1988	(Finland) Ari Vatanen	(Sweden) Bruno Berglund	Peugeot	(Spain) Jordi Arcarons (Spain) José Luís Steuri	KTM	
1989	(Belgium) Jacky Ickx	(Belgium) Christian Tarin	Peugeot	(Portugal) António Lopes (Portugal) João Lopes	Honda	
1990	(Finland) Ari Vatanen	(Sweden) Bruno Berglund	Citroën	(Spain) Agustí Vall (Italy) Davide Trolli	KTM	
1991	(Sweden) Kenneth Eriksson	(Sweden) Staffan Parmander	Mitsubishi	(Spain) Jordi Arcarons (United States) Danny Laporte	Husqvarna	
1992	Cancelled due to the 1992 Summer Olympics					
1993	(France) Pierre Lartigue	(France) Michel Périn	Citroën	(Spain) Josep Lluís Steuri	KTM	
1994	(Finland) Timo Salonen	(United Kingdom) Fred Gallagher	Citroën	(Spain) Agustí Vall	KTM	
1995	(France) Pierre Lartigue	(France) Michel Périn	Citroën	(Spain) Nani Roma	KTM	
1996	(Finland) Ari Vatanen	(France) Gilles Picard	Citroën	(Spain) Josep Lluís Steuri	Honda	
1997	(France) Pierre Lartigue	(France) Michel Périn	Citroën	(Spain) Nani Roma	KTM	
1998	(France) Jean-Louis Schlesser	(France) Jean-Dominique Comolli	Buggy Schlesser	(Spain) Isidre Esteve	KTM	
1999	(Spain) Josep Maria Servià	(France) Thierry Delli-Zotti	Buggy Schlesser	(Spain) Nani Roma	KTM	
2000	(France) Jean-Louis Schlesser	(France) Jean-Dominique Comolli	Buggy Schlesser	(Spain) Isidre Esteve	KTM	
2001	(France) Jean-Louis Schlesser	(France) Jean-Dominique Comolli	Buggy Schlesser	(Spain) Isidre Esteve	KTM	
2002	(France) Jean-Louis Schlesser	(France) Jean-Dominique Comolli	Buggy Schlesser	(Spain) Nani Roma	KTM	
2003	(France) Luc Alphand	(France) Arnaud Debron	BMW X5	(Spain) Isidre Esteve	KTM	
2004	(Portugal) Carlos Sousa	(France) Henri Magne	Mitsubishi Pajero Evolution	(Spain) Marc Coma	KTM	
2005	(Spain) Nani Roma	(France) Henri Magne	Mitsubishi Pajero Evolution	(Spain) Isidre Esteve	KTM	
2006	(Slovakia) Jozel Sýkora	(Slovakia) Marek Sýkora	Mitsubishi Pajero Evolution	(Spain) Isidre Esteve	KTM	
2007	(France) Stéphane Peterhansel	(France) Jean-Paul Cottret	Mitsubishi Pajero Evolution	(Spain) Gerard Farrés	KTM	
2008	(Qatar) Nasser Al-Attiyah	(Sweden) Tina Thörner	BMW X3	(Spain) Marc Coma	KTM	
2009	(Spain) Nani Roma	(France) Michel Périn	BMW X3	(Spain) Gerard Farrés	KTM	
2010	(France) Stéphane Peterhansel	(France) Jean-Paul Cottret	BMW X3	(Spain) Marc Guasch	Yamaha	
2011	(Portugal) Filipe Campos	(Portugal) Jaime Baptista	BMW X3	(Spain) Gerard Farrés	KTM	
2012	(France) Stéphane Peterhansel	(France) Jean-Paul Cottret	Mini All4 Racing	(Spain) Joan Barreda	Husqvarna	
2013	(Spain) Nani Roma	(France) Michel Périn	Mini All4 Racing	(Spain) Joan Barreda	Honda	
2014	(Spain) Nani Roma	(France) Michel Périn	Mini All4 Racing	(Spain) Gerard Farrés	Gas Gas	
2015	(Spain) Nani Roma	(Spain) Àlex Haro	Mini All4 Racing	(Spain) Gerard Farrés	KTM	
2016	(Qatar) Nasser Al-Attiyah	(France) Mathieu Baumel	Toyota Hilux Overdrive	(Spain) Joan Barreda	Honda	
2017	(Qatar) Nasser Al-Attiyah	(France) Mathieu Baumel	Toyota Hilux Overdrive	(Spain) Joan Barreda	Honda	
2018	(Russia) Vladimir Vasilyev	(Russia) Konstantin Zhiltsov	Toyota Hilux Overdrive	(France) Michaël Metge	Sherco	
2019	(Argentina) Orlando Terranova	(Argentina) Ronnie Graue	Mini John Cooper Works Rally	(France) Michaël Metge	Sherco	
2020	Cancelled due to the COVID-19 pandemic					
2021	(Qatar) Nasser Al-Attiyah	(France) Mathieu Baumel	Toyota Hilux Overdrive	(Spain) Joan Barreda	Honda	
2022	(Qatar) Nasser Al-Attiyah	(France) Mathieu Baumel	Toyota GR DKR Hilux	(Spain) Tosha Schareina	Honda	
2023	(Qatar) Nasser Al-Attiyah	(France) Mathieu Baumel	Toyota GR DKR Hilux	(Spain) Tosha Schareina	Honda	
2024	(Belgium) Guillaume de Mévius	(France) Mathieu Baumel	Toyota Hilux Overdrive	(Spain) Tosha Schareina	Honda	
2025	(Portugal) João Ferreira	(Portugal) Filipe Palmeiro	Toyota GR DKR Hilux	(Spain) Lorenzo Santolino	Sherco	
2026	(Portugal) João Ferreira	(Portugal) Filipe Palmeiro	Toyota GR DKR Hilux	(Spain) Lorenzo Santolino	Sherco	
