= 2020 FIM Bajas World Cup =

2020 FIM Bajas World Cup
Previous:	2019	Next:	2021

The 2020 FIM Bajas World Cup season was the 9th season of the FIM Bajas World Cup, an international rally raid competition for motorbikes, quads, and SSV.

== Calendar ==
The calendar for the 2020 season had six baja-style events originally scheduled; two of which in Portugal, with some of the bajas also being part of 2020 FIA World Cup for Cross-Country Bajas. Due to COVID-19 pandemic a new, reduced schedule was issued.

Round	Dates	Rally name
1	19-20 September	(Portugal) Baja do Pinhal
2	5-7 November	(Portugal) Baja Portalegre 500
Cancelled due to the 2019-20 coronavirus pandemic
Original Date		Rally name
16-18 April		Jordan Baja
23-25 July		(Spain) Baja Aragón
13-16 August		(Hungary) Hungarian Baja
26-28 November		(United Arab Emirates) Dubai International Baja

== Regulation Changes ==
Starting with the 2020 season the vehicle classes have been reorganized into the following categories:

- Category 1: Bike (up to 450cc)
- Category 2: Quads (three-wheeled vehicles are forbidden)
- Category 3: SSV
- Category 4: Women
- Category 5: Junior
- Category 6: Veterans

The FIM will award the world cup to both rider and manufacturers of the bike category; as well as to riders only in the quad, SSV, woman, and junior categories. A trophy is awarded to the winners of the veterans category. No awards are given to anything above 450cc.

== Teams and riders ==
Constructor	Bike	Team	Rider	Rounds
(India) Hero	Hero 450	Hero MotoSports Team Rally	(Germany) Sebastian Buhler	All
(India) Hero	Hero 450	Hero MotoSports Team Rally	(India) CS Santosh	1
(India) Hero	Hero 450	Hero MotoSports Team Rally	(Portugal) Joaquim Rodrigues	2
(Austria) KTM	KTM 450 Rally	Crédito Agricola	(Portugal) Mario Patrão	2
(Austria) KTM	KTM 450 Rally	Patrão Motorsport	(Chile) Tomas de Gavardo	All
(Austria) KTM	KTM 450 Rally	Can-Am Off Road Portugal	(Portugal) Micael Simão	All
(Austria) KTM	KTM 350EXCF	Nani Racing	(Spain) Rosa Romero	All
(Austria) KTM	KTM Exc		(Poland) Konrad Dabrowski	2
(Japan) Yamaha	Yamaha WR450F	Pont Grup Yamaha	(Spain) Sara Garcia	All
(Japan) Yamaha	Yamaha Raptor 700		(Czech Republic) Olga Roučková	1
(Japan) Yamaha	Yamaha YZF450	Yamaha Bluemotor	(Portugal) Luis Engeitado	1
(Japan) Yamaha	Yamaha Raptor 686	Visit Sant Antoni - Ibiza	(Spain) Toni Vingut	All
(Austria) Husqvarna	Husqvarna FE450	Orlen Team	(Poland) Adam Tomiczek	1
(Austria) Husqvarna	Husqvarna FE450	Orlen Team	(Poland) Maciej Giemza	All
(Japan) Honda	Honda CRF450 RX	Team Bianchi Prata Honda	(Portugal) Pedro Bianchi Prata	All
(Japan) Honda	Honda CRF450 RX	Team Bianchi Prata Honda	(Portugal) Rui Ferreira	All
(Japan) Honda	Honda CRF300 RF	Team Bianchi Prata Honda	(Portugal) Janaina Souza	All

== Results ==
- Positions shown are not overall race positions but positions within the FIM Bajas World Cup. Both classifications may coincide.

=== Motorbikes ===
Round	Rally name	Podium finishers			
Round	Rally name	Rank	Rider	Bike	Time
1	(Portugal) Baja do Pinhal	1	(Germany) Sebastian Bühler	Hero 450	4:15:05
1	(Portugal) Baja do Pinhal	2	(Poland) Adam Tomiczek	Husqvarna FE450	4:18:07
1	(Portugal) Baja do Pinhal	3	(Poland) Maciej Giemza	Husqvarna FE450	4:20:51
2	(Portugal) Baja Portalegre 500	1	(Germany) Sebastian Bühler	Hero 450	1:55:16
2	(Portugal) Baja Portalegre 500	2	(Portugal) Joaquim Rodrigues	Hero 450	1:56:30
2	(Portugal) Baja Portalegre 500	3	(Portugal) Micael Simão	KTM Exc-F 450	2:08:52

=== Quads ===
Round	Rally name	Podium finishers			
Round	Rally name	Rank	Rider	Bike	Time
1	(Portugal) Baja do Pinhal	1	(Portugal) Luis Engeitado	Yamaha YZF450	4:22:01
1	(Portugal) Baja do Pinhal	2	(Spain) Toni Vingut	Yamaha Raptor 686	4:46:28
1	(Portugal) Baja do Pinhal	3	(Czech Republic) Olga Roučková	Yamaha Raptor 700	5:15:55
2	(Portugal) Baja Portalegre 500	1	(Spain) Toni Vingut	Yamaha Raptor 700	2:51:52
2	(Portugal) Baja Portalegre 500	2	None		
2	(Portugal) Baja Portalegre 500	3	None		

=== SSV ===
Round	Rally name	Podium finishers			
Round	Rally name	Rank	Rider	Bike	Time
1	(Portugal) Baja do Pinhal	1	(Portugal) João Dias	Can-Am X3	4:19:42
1	(Portugal) Baja do Pinhal	2	(Portugal) Alexandre Pinto (Portugal) Fábio Belo	Can-Am X3	4:20:41
1	(Portugal) Baja do Pinhal	3	(Portugal) Luis Cidade (Portugal) Pedro Mendonça	Maverick XRC	4:23:56
2	(Portugal) Baja Portalegre 500	1	(Portugal) João Dias	Can-Am	2:02:54
2	(Portugal) Baja Portalegre 500	2	(Portugal) Alexandre Pinto (Portugal) Fábio Belo	Can-Am	2:03:14
2	(Portugal) Baja Portalegre 500	3	(Portugal) Luis Cidade (Portugal) Pedro Mendonça	Bombardier	2:04:46

== Championship standings ==
=== Riders' championship ===
- Points for final positions are awarded as follows:

Position	1st	2nd	3rd	4th	5th	6th	7th	8th	9th	10th	11th	12th	13th	14th	15th+
Points	25	20	16	13	11	10	9	8	7	6	5	4	3	2	1

==== Motorbikes ====
- Positions shown are not overall race positions but positions within the FIM Bajas World Cup classification.

Pos	Rider	PIN (Portugal)	POR (Portugal)	Points
1	(Germany) Sebastian Bühler	1	1	50
2	(Portugal) Micael Simão	4	3	29
3	(Poland) Maciej Giemza	3	4	29
4	(Chile) Tomas De Gavardo	5	5	22
5	(Portugal) Joaquim Rodrigues		2	20
6	(Poland) Adam Tomiczek	2		20
7	(Portugal) Pedro Bianchi Prata	7	7	18
8	(Brazil) Janaina Souza	8	8	16
9	(Spain) Sara Garcia	9	11	12
10	(Portugal) Rui Ferreira	10	10	12
11	(Poland) Konrad Dabrowski		6	10
12	(India) CS Santosh	6		10
13	(Spain) Rosa Romero		9	7
Pos	Rider	PIN (Portugal)	POR (Portugal)	Points

==== Quads ====
Pos	Rider	PIN (Portugal)	POR (Portugal)	Points
1	(Spain) Toni Vingut	2	1	45
2	(Portugal) Luis Engeitado	1		25
3	(Czech Republic) Olga Roučková	3		16
Pos	Rider	PIN (Portugal)	POR (Portugal)	Points

==== Women, Junior & Veteran ====
Winners
Women	Junior	Veteran Trophy
(Brazil) Janaina Souza	(Poland) Maciej Giemza	(Portugal) Pedro Bianchi Prata

==== SSV ====
Pos	Rider	PIN (Portugal)	POR (Portugal)	Points
1	(Portugal) João Dias	1	1	50
2	(Portugal) Alexandre Pinto	2	2	40
3	(Portugal) Luis Cidade Pires	3	3	32
Pos	Rider	PIN (Portugal)	POR (Portugal)	Points
