= 2021 FIM Bajas World Cup =

2021 FIM Bajas World Cup
Previous:	2020	Next:	2022

The 2021 FIM Bajas World Cup season was the 10th season of the FIM Bajas World Cup, an international rally raid competition for motorbikes, quads and SSV.

== Calendar ==
The calendar for the 2021 season had ten baja-style events originally scheduled, some of the events also being part of 2021 FIA World Cup for Cross-Country Bajas. Due to the impact of the COVID-19, the Baja do Pinhal has been postponed by the organizers to dates unknown yet.

Round	Dates	Rally name
1	18-20 February	(United Arab Emirates) Dubai International Baja
2	18-20 March	Jordan Baja
3	23-25 July	(Spain) Baja Aragón
4	5-8 August	(Hungary) Hungarian Baja
5	30 September - 2 October	Qatar International Baja
6	15-17 October	(Portugal) Baja do Oeste Torres Vedras
7	28-30 October	(Portugal) Baja Portalegre

== Regulations ==
The following classes and categories are included:

- Category 1: Bike (Up to 450cc single or twin cylinder, 2T or 4T)
- Category 2: Quads (three-wheel vehicles are forbidden)
- Category 3: SSV
- Class 1: Women
- Class 2: Junior
- Class 3: Veterans

The FIM will award the World Cup to both riders and manufacturers of the bike category; also to riders only in the quad, and SSV (driver and co-driver) categories, as well as to riders only in the woman, and junior classes. A Trophy is awarded to the winners of the veterans category. Any other category, i.e. “Over 450cc” do not count for any of the FIM Baja World Cups.

== Teams and riders ==
Bajas World Cup
Constructor	Team	Rider	Rounds
(Italy) Beta	Soul Riders Adventure Team	(Tunisia) Bassem Hichri	5
(Italy) Beta		(Qatar) Abdulrahman Al Sheeb	5
(India) Hero	Hero Motorsports	(Portugal) Joaquim Rodrigues	4
(India) Hero	Hero Motorsports	(Germany) Sebastian Bühler	4, 7
(Japan) Honda	Honda UAE	(South Africa) Aaron Mare	1
(Japan) Honda	Monster Energy Honda Rally Team	(Spain) Joan Barreda	3
(Japan) Honda		(Qatar) Mohammed Al-Thani	5
(Japan) Honda	Team Bianchi Prata	(Czech Republic) Martin Michek	6
(Japan) Honda	Team Bianchi Prata	(Hungary) Richárd Hodola	7
(Japan) Honda		(Belgium) Rafael Marques	7
(Austria) Husqvarna	Orion Motor Racing Group	(Czech Republic) Martin Michek	1, 4, 7
(Austria) Husqvarna	SRG Motorsports	(United Arab Emirates) Mohammed Al Balooshi	1–2, 7
(Austria) Husqvarna	MX Ride Dubai	(United Arab Emirates) Sultan Al Balooshi	1, 5
(Austria) Husqvarna	Saudi Dirtbike Center	(Saudi Arabia) Mishal Alghuneim	1
(Austria) Husqvarna	AG Dakar School	(Lithuania) Modestas Siliunas	1
(Austria) Husqvarna	Zigmas Dakar Team	(Lithuania) Arunas Gelazninkas	1, 4
(Austria) Husqvarna	Bahrain Motor Federation	(Bahrain) Salman Farhan	2, 5
(Austria) Husqvarna	Husqvarna Motos Arribas	(Spain) Tosha Schareina	3
(Austria) Husqvarna	Husqvarna Motos Arribas	(Mexico) Juan Pablo Guillen	3
(Austria) Husqvarna	Mário Patrão Adventure	(Portugal) Mário Patrão	3
(Austria) KTM	Motozone Dubai KTM UAE	(United Kingdom) Sam Smith	1
(Austria) KTM	KTM Amman Darwazeh Motors	(Jordan) Abdullah Abu Aisheh	1–2, 7
(Austria) KTM		(Croatia) Darko Marasovic	1
(Austria) KTM		(Saudi Arabia) Mohammed Al-Muaikil	1, 5
(Austria) KTM		(Saudi Arabia) Abdulhalim Al-Mogeera	1–2, 5
(Austria) KTM		(United Kingdom) Makis Rees-Stavros	1, 5
(Austria) KTM		(Israel) Rotem Costa	2
(Austria) KTM		(Israel) Amit Sadot	2
(Austria) KTM	Strojrent Racing	(Czech Republic) Jan Brabec	3
(Austria) KTM	BMS Moto	(Italy) Alberto Bertoldi	3
(Austria) KTM	Barilla Racing	(Hungary) Richárd Hodola	3–4
(Austria) KTM	Dafy Enduro Team	(France) Jeremy Miroir	3
(Austria) KTM	Nomade Racing	(France) Mathieu Doveze	3–4, 7
(Austria) KTM	Marcic Racing	(Slovenia) Simon Marcic	4
(Austria) KTM	Slovnaft Rally Team	(Slovakia) Stefan Svitko	4
(Austria) KTM	MX Ride Dubai	(United Arab Emirates) Mohammed Al Balooshi	5
(Austria) KTM	MX Ride Dubai	(Kuwait) Abdullah AlShatti	5, 7
(Austria) KTM		(New Zealand) Edward Lines	5
(Austria) KTM	KIMC	(Kuwait) Mohammed Jaafar	5
(Austria) KTM		(Russia) Gennadii Korolenko	5
(Spain) Rieju	SHAD LS2	(Spain) Joan Pedrero	3
(France) Sherco	Sherco Factory Rally Team	(Spain) Lorenzo Santolino	3
(France) Sherco	Sherco Factory Rally Team	(Portugal) Rui Gonçalves	3
(Japan) Yamaha		(United Arab Emirates) Abdulla Dakhan	1
(Japan) Yamaha		(Saudi Arabia) Badr Abalkhail	1
(Japan) Yamaha		(Portugal) Tiago Santos	4, 6–7
(Japan) Yamaha		(Australia) Martin Chalmers	5
Women's Bajas World Cup
Constructor	Team	Rider	Rounds
(Italy) Beta	Desert Rose Academy	(United Kingdom) Vanessa Ruck	5
(Austria) Husqvarna	TVS Racing	(India) Aishwarya Pissay	1–2
(Austria) Husqvarna	SRG Motorsports	(Netherlands) Mirjam Pol	1
(Austria) Husqvarna	MP1	(Netherlands) Mirjam Pol	3–4, 7
(Austria) KTM		(Andorra) Margot Llobera	1, 4, 7
(Austria) KTM	Duust Diverse Rally Team	(Kuwait) Sarah Khuraibet	4, 7
(Japan) Yamaha	Yamaha Kuwait KIMC	(Kuwait) Sarah Khuraibet	1–2, 5
(Japan) Yamaha	Pont Grup Yamaha	(Spain) Sara García	3, 6–7
(Japan) Yamaha		(Czech Republic) Olga Roučková	4
Junior Bajas World Cup
Constructor	Team	Rider	Rounds
(Austria) KTM	DUUST Rally Team	(Poland) Konrad Dabrowski	1, 3–4, 7
(Austria) KTM		(Andorra) Margot Llobera	1, 4, 7
(Austria) KTM	KTM Amman Darwazeh Motors	(Jordan) Zaid Jaber	2
(Austria) KTM		(France) Neels Theric	3, 7
(Austria) KTM	Nomade Racing	(France) Jean-Loup Lepan	3
(Austria) KTM	Team Giroud/Drag'on/SMX Racing	(France) Kévin Giroud	3
(Austria) KTM		(United Kingdom) Robert Wallace	5, 7
Veteran Bajas World Cup
Constructor	Team	Rider	Rounds
(Japan) Honda	Team Bianchi Prata	(Portugal) Rui Ferreira	3, 6–7
(Japan) Honda	Team Bianchi Prata	(Portugal) Pedro Bianchi Prata	3, 6–7
(Japan) Honda		(Qatar) Jamal Al Qeteti	5
(Japan) Honda		(Qatar) Tariq Al-Nasr	5
(Austria) Husqvarna	SRG Motorsports	(South Africa) Mark Ackerman	1
(Austria) Husqvarna	Intelec Holdings	(Mozambique) Paulo Oliveira	2, 5
(Austria) Husqvarna		(Italy) Walter Dalmasso	3
(Austria) KTM		(United Kingdom) Barry Howe	1, 5
(Austria) KTM	Team Bianchi Prata	(Mozambique) Paulo Oliveira	3, 7
(Austria) KTM	Nomade Racing	(France) Philippe Gendron	3
(Austria) KTM	Nomade Racing	(France) Bruno Scheurer	3
(Austria) KTM		(United Kingdom) Andrew Newland	5
(Austria) KTM		(Qatar) Mohammed Al Kaabi	5
(Austria) KTM		(United Kingdom) Kurt Burroughs	5
(Austria) KTM		(United Kingdom) Richard Dors	5
(Japan) Yamaha	Visit Sant Antoni - Ibiza	(Spain) Toni Vingut	3
Quad Bajas World Cup
Constructor	Team	Rider	Rounds
(Austria) KTM	ICT Iberica - Foxy	(Spain) Mario Gajon	3
(Austria) KTM	Team Giroud/Drag'on/SMX Racing	(France) Kévin Giroud	3
(Japan) Yamaha	Saudi Bikers	(Saudi Arabia) Haitham Al-Tuwayjiri	1–5, 7
(Japan) Yamaha	Saudi Bikers	(Saudi Arabia) Faisal Al-Suwayh	All
(Japan) Yamaha	Hani Racing	(Saudi Arabia) Hani Al-Noumesi	1–2, 4–7
(Japan) Yamaha		(Saudi Arabia) Abdalmajeed Al-Khulaifi	1
(Japan) Yamaha	Visit Sant Antoni - Ibiza	(Spain) Toni Vingut	3
(Japan) Yamaha	Team Giroud/Drag'on/SMX Racing	(France) Alexandre Giroud	3
(Japan) Yamaha	FN Speed Team	(Paraguay) Jorge Lafarja	3
(Japan) Yamaha	SMX Racing	(France) Jérôme Connart	3
(Japan) Yamaha	Hoffer Racing	(Slovakia) Juraj Varga	4
(Japan) Yamaha		(Czech Republic) Olga Roučková	4
(Japan) Yamaha		(Saudi Arabia) Sultan Almasoud	5
SSV Bajas World Cup
Constructor	Team	Rider	Rounds
(Canada) Can-Am		(Lebanon) Henry Kahy (Lebanon) Nadim Ziade	5
(Canada) Can-Am	Benimoto Racing	(Portugal) Alexandre Pinto	6–7
(United States) Polaris	ORP Racing	(Qatar) Khalid Al-Mohannadi (United Kingdom) Chris Barwick	5
(Japan) Yamaha	Nasser Racing	(Qatar) Ahmed Alkuwari (Qatar) Nasser Alkuwari	5
(Japan) Yamaha		(Qatar) Abdulla Al-Khelaifi (Qatar) Abdulaziz Aljabri	5
(Japan) Yamaha		(Italy) Alessandro Tinaburri (Italy) Emiliano Tinaburri	7

== Results ==
=== Motorbikes ===
Round	Rally name	Podium finishers			
Round	Rally name	Rank	Rider	Bike	Time
1	(United Arab Emirates) Dubai International Baja	1	(United Kingdom) Sam Smith	KTM 450SX-F	5:50:03
1	(United Arab Emirates) Dubai International Baja	2	(Czech Republic) Martin Michek	Husqvarna 450SX-F	5:51:34
1	(United Arab Emirates) Dubai International Baja	3	(United Arab Emirates) Mohammed Al Balooshi	Husqvarna FC450	6:02:59
2	Jordan Baja	1	(United Arab Emirates) Mohammed Al Balooshi	Husqvarna FC450	9:47:02
2	Jordan Baja	2	(Jordan) Abdullah Abu Aisheh	KTM 450SX-F	10:05:49
2	Jordan Baja	3	(Saudi Arabia) Abdulhalim Al-Mogeera	KTM 450EXC-F	11:17:46
3	(Spain) Baja Aragón	1	(Spain) Joan Barreda	Honda CRF450	6:34:39
3	(Spain) Baja Aragón	2	(Spain) Tosha Schareina	Husqvarna FE450	6:39:22
3	(Spain) Baja Aragón	3	(Spain) Lorenzo Santolino	Sherco RTR 450 Rally	6:39:30
4	(Hungary) Hungarian Baja	1	(Germany) Sebastian Bühler	Hero 450 Rally	3:43:11
4	(Hungary) Hungarian Baja	2	(Slovakia) Stefan Svitko	KTM 450	3:46:53
4	(Hungary) Hungarian Baja	3	(Portugal) Joaquim Rodrigues	Hero 450 Rally	3:48:22
5	Qatar International Baja	1	(United Arab Emirates) Mohammed Al Balooshi	KTM 450 Rally Replica	9:25:12
5	Qatar International Baja	2	(United Kingdom) Robert Wallace	KTM 450 Rally Replica	9:36:09
5	Qatar International Baja	3	(United Kingdom) Andrew Newland	KTM 450EXC-F	10:00:49
6	(Portugal) Baja do Oeste Torres Vedras	1	(Czech Republic) Martin Michek	Honda CRF450	5:01:48
6	(Portugal) Baja do Oeste Torres Vedras	2	(Portugal) Tiago Santos	Yamaha WRF450	5:04:28
6	(Portugal) Baja do Oeste Torres Vedras	3	(Spain) Sara García	Yamaha WRF450	5:38:13
7	(Portugal) Baja Portalegre	1	(France) Neels Theric	KTM 450 EXC-F	3:30:36
7	(Portugal) Baja Portalegre	2	(France) Mathieu Doveze	KTM 450 Rally Replica	3:31:23
7	(Portugal) Baja Portalegre	3	(Portugal) Tiago Santos	Yamaha WRF450	3:44:09

=== Quads ===
Round	Rally name	Podium finishers			
Round	Rally name	Rank	Rider	Bike	Time
1	(United Arab Emirates) Dubai International Baja	1	(Saudi Arabia) Haitham Al-Tuwayjiri	Yamaha YZF450R	11:22:56
1	(United Arab Emirates) Dubai International Baja	2	(Saudi Arabia) Hani Al-Noumesi	Yamaha Raptor 700R	12:20:23
2	Jordan Baja	1	(Saudi Arabia) Faisal Al-Suwayh	Yamaha YZF450R	67:28:00
3	(Spain) Baja Aragón	1	(France) Alexandre Giroud	Yamaha Raptor 700R	7:28:56
3	(Spain) Baja Aragón	2	(France) Jérôme Connart	Yamaha Raptor 700R	7:39:35
3	(Spain) Baja Aragón	3	(Spain) Toni Vingut	Yamaha Raptor 700R	7:51:58
4	(Hungary) Hungarian Baja	1	(Slovakia) Juraj Varga	Yamaha YFM Raptor 700R	4:25:13
4	(Hungary) Hungarian Baja	2	(Saudi Arabia) Haitham Al-Tuwayjiri	Yamaha YFZ450R	4:52:12
4	(Hungary) Hungarian Baja	3	(Saudi Arabia) Faisal Al-Suwayh	Yamaha YFZ450R	5:44:45
5	Qatar International Baja	1	(Saudi Arabia) Haitham Al-Tuwayjiri	Yamaha YFZ450R	15:03:29
5	Qatar International Baja	2	(Saudi Arabia) Sultan Almasoud	Yamaha YFM Raptor 700R	18:23:56
5	Qatar International Baja	3	(Saudi Arabia) Hani Al-Noumesi	Yamaha YFM Raptor 700R	18:41:04
6	(Portugal) Baja do Oeste Torres Vedras	1	(Saudi Arabia) Faisal Al-Suwayh	Yamaha YFZ450R	6:22:04
6	(Portugal) Baja do Oeste Torres Vedras	2	(Saudi Arabia) Hani Al-Noumesi	Yamaha YFZ450R	7:15:44
7	(Portugal) Baja Portalegre	1	(Saudi Arabia) Haitham Al-Tuwayjiri	Yamaha YFZ450R	5:00:54
7	(Portugal) Baja Portalegre	2	(Saudi Arabia) Hani Al-Noumesi	Yamaha YFZ450R	5:13:14
7	(Portugal) Baja Portalegre	3	(Saudi Arabia) Faisal Al-Suwayh	Yamaha YFZ450R	7:26:27

=== SSVs ===
Round	Rally name	Podium finishers			
Round	Rally name	Rank	Rider	Bike	Time
5	Qatar International Baja	1	(Qatar) Ahmed Alkuwari (Qatar) Nasser Alkuwari	Yamaha YXZ1000R	7:21:48
5	Qatar International Baja	2	(Qatar) Abdulla Al-Khelaifi (Qatar) Abdulaziz Aljabri	Yamaha YXZ1000R	10:18:11
5	Qatar International Baja	3	(Qatar) Khalid Al-Mohannadi (United Kingdom) Chris Barwick	Polaris RZR	14:23:28
6	(Portugal) Baja do Oeste Torres Vedras	1	(Portugal) Alexandre Pinto	Can-Am Maverick	4:46:53
7	(Portugal) Baja Portalegre	1	(Portugal) Alexandre Pinto	Can-Am Maverick	3:25:29
7	(Portugal) Baja Portalegre	2	(Italy) Alessandro Tinaburri (Italy) Emiliano Tinaburri	Yamaha YXZ1000R	4:03:11

== Championship standings ==
=== Riders' championship ===
- Points for final positions in the first six rounds are awarded as follows:

Position	1st	2nd	3rd	4th	5th	6th	7th	8th	9th	10th	11th	12th	13th	14th	15th+
Points	25	20	16	13	11	10	9	8	7	6	5	4	3	2	1

- Points for final positions in the final round are awarded as follows:

Position	1st	2nd	3rd	4th	5th	6th	7th	8th	9th	10th	11th	12th	13th	14th	15th+
Points	50	40	32	26	22	20	18	16	14	12	10	8	6	4	2

A rider's best two results from the first six rounds, along with their result at the final round, will count for the championship standings.

==== Motorbikes ====
Pos	Rider	Manufacturer	DUB (United Arab Emirates)	JOR (Jordan)	ARA (Spain)	HUN (Hungary)	QAT (Qatar)	OES (Portugal)	POR (Portugal)	Points	Best Score
1	(Czech Republic) Martin Michek	Husqvarna	2							78	67
1	(Czech Republic) Martin Michek	KTM				5			5	78	67
1	(Czech Republic) Martin Michek	Honda						1		78	67
2	(France) Mathieu Doveze	KTM			6	4			2	63	
3	(Portugal) Tiago Santos	Yamaha				8		2	3	60	
4	(France) Neels Theric	KTM			8				1	58	
5	(Jordan) Abdullah Abu Aisheh	KTM	4	2					6	53	
6	(United Arab Emirates) Mohammed Al Balooshi	Husqvarna	3	1			1		15	68	52
7	(United Kingdom) Robert Wallace	KTM					2		4	46	
8	(Portugal) Pedro Bianchi Prata	Honda			12			4	7	35	
9	(Netherlands) Mirjam Pol	Husqvarna	10		18	11			8	28	27
10	(Germany) Sebastian Bühler	Hero				1			Ret	25	
11	(Spain) Joan Barreda	Honda			1					25	
12	(United Kingdom) Sam Smith	KTM	1							25	
13	(Portugal) Rui Ferreira	Honda			15			5	10	24	
14	(Spain) Sara García	Yamaha			16			3	13	23	
15	(Kuwait) Abdullah AlShatti	KTM					4		11	23	
16	(Poland) Konrad Dąbrowski	KTM	6		10	7			18	27	21
17	(Slovakia) Stefan Svitko	KTM				2				20	
18	(Spain) Tosha Schareina	Husqvarna			2					20	
19	(Hungary) Richárd Hodola	KTM			20	9			9	22	
20	(Mozambique) Paulo Oliveira	Husqvarna		5	17		NC		12	20	
21	(Saudi Arabia) Abdulhalim Al-Mogeera	KTM	16	3			NC			17	
22	(United Kingdom) Andrew Newland	KTM					3			16	
23	(Portugal) Joaquim Rodrigues	Hero				3				16	
24	(Spain) Lorenzo Santolino	Sherco			3					16	
25	(Bahrain) Salman Farhan	Husqvarna		6			10			16	
26	(Spain) Joan Pedrero	Rieju			4					13	
27	(Israel) Amit Sadot	KTM		4						13	
28	(Andorra) Margot Llobera	KTM	12			12			14	12	
29	(United Kingdom) Richard Dors	KTM					5			11	
30	(Portugal) Rui Gonçalves	Sherco			5					11	
31	(South Africa) Mark Ackerman	Husqvarna	5							11	
32	(United Kingdom) Makis Rees-Stavros	KTM	Ret				6			10	
33	(Lithuania) Arunas Gelazninkas	Husqvarna	Ret			6				10	
34	(Russia) Gennadii Korolenko	KTM					7			9	
35	(France) Jeremy Miroir	KTM			7					9	
36	(Israel) Rotem Costa	KTM		7						9	
37	(United Arab Emirates) Abdulla Dakhan	Yamaha	7							9	
38	(New Zealand) Edward Lines	KTM					8			8	
39	(Saudi Arabia) Mishal Alghuneim	Husqvarna	8							8	
40	(Qatar) Mohammed Al-Thani	Honda					9			7	
41	(France) Jean-Loup Lepan	KTM			9					7	
42	(Croatia) Darko Marasovic	KTM	9							7	
43	(Kuwait) Sarah Khuraibet	Yamaha	15	NC			NC			6	
43	(Kuwait) Sarah Khuraibet	KTM				13			17	6	
44	(Slovenia) Simon Marčič	KTM				10				6	
45	(France) Philippe Gendron	KTM			11					5	
46	(Saudi Arabia) Mohammed Al-Muaikil	KTM	11				Ret			5	
47	(Italy) Alberto Bertoldi	KTM			13					3	
48	(Lithuania) Modestas Siliunas	Husqvarna	13							3	
49	(Mexico) Juan Pablo Guillen	Husqvarna			14					2	
50	(India) Aishwarya Pissay	Husqvarna	14	Ret						2	
51	(Belgium) Rafael Marques	Honda							16	2	
52	(Italy) Walter Dalmasso	Husqvarna			19					1	
	(United Kingdom) Barry Howe	KTM	Ret				NC			0	
	(United Kingdom) Vanessa Ruck	Beta					NC			0	
	(United Arab Emirates) Sultan Al Balooshi	Husqvarna	Ret				Ret			0	
	(South Africa) Aaron Mare	Honda	Ret							0	
	(Saudi Arabia) Badr Abalkhail	Yamaha	Ret							0	
	(Jordan) Zaid Jaber	KTM		Ret						0	
	(Czech Republic) Jan Brabec	KTM			Ret					0	
	(Portugal) Mário Patrão	Husqvarna			Ret					0	
	(France) Bruno Scheurer	KTM			Ret					0	
	(Qatar) Abdulrahman Al Sheeb	Beta					Ret			0	
	(Qatar) Tariq Al-Nasr	Honda					Ret			0	
	(Tunisia) Bassem Hichri	Beta					Ret			0	
	(United Kingdom) Kurt Burroughs	KTM					Ret			0	
	(Australia) Martin Chalmers	Yamaha					Ret			0	
	(Qatar) Mohammed Al Kaabi	KTM					Ret			0	
	(Kuwait) Mohammed Jaafar	KTM					Ret			0	
	(Qatar) Jamal Al Qeteti	Honda					Ret			0	
Pos	Rider	Manufacturer	DUB (United Arab Emirates)	JOR (Jordan)	ARA (Spain)	HUN (Hungary)	QAT (Qatar)	OES (Portugal)	POR (Portugal)	Points	Best Score

==== Quads ====
Pos	Rider	Manufacturer	DUB (United Arab Emirates)	JOR (Jordan)	ARA (Spain)	HUN (Hungary)	QAT (Qatar)	OES (Portugal)	POR (Portugal)	Points	Best Score
1	(Saudi Arabia) Haitham Al-Tuwayjiri	Yamaha	1	Ret	5	2	1		1	131	100
2	(Saudi Arabia) Faisal Al-Suwayh	Yamaha	Ret	1	6	3	Ret	1	3	108	82
3	(Saudi Arabia) Hani Al-Noumesi	Yamaha	2	NC		5	NC	2	2	107	80
4	(Slovakia) Juraj Varga	Yamaha				1				25	
5	(France) Alexandre Giroud	Yamaha			1					25	
7	(France) Jérôme Connart	Yamaha			2					20	
8	(Spain) Toni Vingut	Yamaha			3					16	
9	(Czech Republic) Olga Roučková	Yamaha				4				13	
10	(France) Kévin Giroud	KTM			4					13	
	(Saudi Arabia) Sultan Almasoud	Yamaha					NC			0	
	(Saudi Arabia) Abdalmajeed Al-Khulaifi	Yamaha	Ret							0	
	(Paraguay) Jorge Lafarja	Yamaha			Ret					0	
	(Spain) Mario Gajon	KTM			Ret					0	
Pos	Rider	Manufacturer	DUB (United Arab Emirates)	JOR (Jordan)	ARA (Spain)	HUN (Hungary)	QAT (Qatar)	OES (Portugal)	POR (Portugal)	Points	Best Score

==== Women ====
Pos	Rider	Manufacturer	DUB (United Arab Emirates)	JOR (Jordan)	ARA (Spain)	HUN (Hungary)	QAT (Qatar)	OES (Portugal)	POR (Portugal)	Points	Best Score
1	(Netherlands) Mirjam Pol	Husqvarna	1		2	1			1	120	100
2	(Spain) Sara García	Yamaha			1			1	2	90	
3	(Andorra) Margot Llobera	KTM	2			2			3	72	
4	(Kuwait) Sarah Khuraibet	Yamaha	4	NC			NC			52	
4	(Kuwait) Sarah Khuraibet	KTM				4			4	52	
5	(Czech Republic) Olga Roučková	Yamaha				3				16	
6	(India) Aishwarya Pissay	Husqvarna	3	Ret						16	
	(United Kingdom) Vanessa Ruck	Beta					NC			0	
Pos	Rider	Manufacturer	DUB (United Arab Emirates)	JOR (Jordan)	ARA (Spain)	HUN (Hungary)	QAT (Qatar)	OES (Portugal)	POR (Portugal)	Points	Best Score

==== Junior ====
Pos	Rider	Manufacturer	DUB (United Arab Emirates)	JOR (Jordan)	ARA (Spain)	HUN (Hungary)	QAT (Qatar)	OES (Portugal)	POR (Portugal)	Points	Best Score
1	(Poland) Konrad Dąbrowski	KTM	1		3	1			4	92	76
2	(France) Neels Theric	KTM			1				1	75	
3	(Andorra) Margot Llobera	KTM	2			2			3	72	
4	(United Kingdom) Robert Wallace	KTM					1		2	65	
5	(France) Jean-Loup Lepan	KTM			2					20	
6	(France) Kévin Giroud	KTM			4					13	
	(Jordan) Zaid Jaber	KTM		Ret						0	
Pos	Rider	Manufacturer	DUB (United Arab Emirates)	JOR (Jordan)	ARA (Spain)	HUN (Hungary)	QAT (Qatar)	OES (Portugal)	POR (Portugal)	Points	Best Score

==== Veteran ====
Pos	Rider	Manufacturer	DUB (United Arab Emirates)	JOR (Jordan)	ARA (Spain)	HUN (Hungary)	QAT (Qatar)	OES (Portugal)	POR (Portugal)	Points	Best Score
1	(Portugal) Pedro Bianchi Prata	Honda			3			1	1	91	
2	(Portugal) Rui Ferreira	Honda			4			2	2	73	
3	(Mozambique) Paulo Oliveira	Husqvarna		1	5		NC		3	68	
4	(United Kingdom) Andrew Newland	KTM					1			25	
5	(France) Philippe Gendron	KTM			1					25	
6	(South Africa) Mark Ackerman	Husqvarna	1							25	
7	(United Kingdom) Richard Dors	KTM					2			20	
8	(Spain) Toni Vingut	Yamaha			2					20	
9	(Italy) Walter Dalmasso	Husqvarna			6					10	
	(United Kingdom) Barry Howe	KTM	Ret				NC			0	
	(France) Bruno Scheurer	KTM			Ret					0	
	(Qatar) Tariq Al-Nasr	Honda					Ret			0	
	(United Kingdom) Kurt Burroughs	KTM					Ret			0	
	(Qatar) Mohammed Al Kaabi	KTM					Ret			0	
	(Qatar) Jamal Al Qeteti	Honda					Ret			0	
Pos	Rider	Manufacturer	DUB (United Arab Emirates)	JOR (Jordan)	ARA (Spain)	HUN (Hungary)	QAT (Qatar)	OES (Portugal)	POR (Portugal)	Points	Best Score

==== SSVs ====
Pos	Rider	Manufacturer	DUB (United Arab Emirates)	JOR (Jordan)	ARA (Spain)	HUN (Hungary)	QAT (Qatar)	OES (Portugal)	POR (Portugal)	Points	Best Score
1	(Portugal) Alexandre Pinto	Can-Am						1	1	75	
2	(Italy) Alessandro Tinaburri (Italy) Emiliano Tinaburri	Yamaha							2	40	
3	(Qatar) Ahmed Alkuwari (Qatar) Nasser Alkuwari	Yamaha					1			25	
4	(Qatar) Abdulla Al-Khelaifi (Qatar) Abdulaziz Aljabri	Yamaha					2			20	
5	(Qatar) Khalid Al-Mohannadi (United Kingdom) Chris Barwick	Polaris					3			16	
	(Lebanon) Henry Kahy (Lebanon) Nadim Ziade	Can-Am					Ret			0	
Pos	Rider	Manufacturer	DUB (United Arab Emirates)	JOR (Jordan)	ARA (Spain)	HUN (Hungary)	QAT (Qatar)	OES (Portugal)	POR (Portugal)	Points	Best Score

=== Manufacturers' championship ===
- Points for manufacturers are awarded by the points of the top two riders per manufacturer at each baja being added together:

Pos	Manufacturer	DUB (United Arab Emirates)	JOR (Jordan)	ARA (Spain)	HUN (Hungary)	QAT (Qatar)	OES (Portugal)	POR (Portugal)	Points
1	(Austria) KTM	38	36	19	33	45		90	261
2	(Austria) Husqvarna	36	36	22	15	9		26	144
3	(Japan) Honda	0		29		7	38	32	106
4	(Japan) Yamaha	10	0	1	8	1	36	38	94
5	(India) Hero				41			0	41
6	(France) Sherco			27					27
7	(Spain) Rieju			13					13
	(Italy) Beta					0			0
Pos	Manufacturer	DUB (United Arab Emirates)	JOR (Jordan)	ARA (Spain)	HUN (Hungary)	QAT (Qatar)	OES (Portugal)	POR (Portugal)	Points
