= 2025 Indian Supercross Racing League =

Indian motorcycle supercross league

2025 Indian Supercross Racing League is the second Season that will be held form October to December 2025. The first round will be held in Pune on 25 and 26 October 2025 and will then move to Telangana and Kerala in December for the final two rounds. After another round in Hyderabad on 6 and 7 December 2025, the season finale is scheduled to be held at Kozhikode on 20 and 21 December 2025.

After the auction, 36 riders were selected for the second season from the 155 riders who took part in the bidding. American rider Kyle Peters topped the bidding process with the highest price while multiple National champion Rugved Barguje, was the best of the lot among the Indian riders. Jack Nunn became the youngest rider to be signed up in the 250cc category. All the six teams together spent about INR.60,000,000 in the bidding process to select their riders. Top stars like Jordi Tixier, Matt Moss, Reid Taylor and Thanarat Penjan will be back for the second season. Alexander Fedorstov, the American national champion of the AMA SMX Next, Adrien Escoffier of France, and Luke Clout of Australia are expected to line up for Season 2. Some Indian stars who confirmed during the auction are Ikshan Shanbhag and Sarthak Chavan, who is also a strong contender in the Indian national racing championship.

Indewheelers Motorsports and Tricolour Motorsports will be the new teams in the second season replacing SG Speed Racers and Mohite's Racing Team. Indewheelers is started by Vikram Dhar, who co-owns the team with entrepreneur Ajay Agrawal, backed by the Arabian Coast Group, which is expected to provide technical and financial backing their debut season in ISRL 2025.

The other teams who made their debut in the inaugural year are 450cc and 250cc for international riders, and a separate 250cc category for Indian and Asian riders. BB Racing, Big Rock Motorsports SMX, Gujarat Trailblazers, and Reise Torqracers. There will be three classes. They are 450cc and 250cc for international riders, and a separate 250cc category for Indian and Asian riders.

In July 2025, actor Salman Khan unveiled Season 2 after he was announced as the brand ambassador for the league.

Team		owner	Debut	Riders	Remarks
1	BB Racing	Panchshil Realty	2024	Jordi Tixier, Anthony Bourdon, Hunter Schlosser and Lane Shah, Athison Ruadreo, Jacques Gunavardena	
2	BigRock Motorsports SX	BigRock Dirt Park CS Santosh	2024	John Short, Matt Moss, Slade Varola, Alexander Fedortsov, Thanarat Penjan, Nakami Makarim	Season 1 winner
3	Gujarat Trailblazers	Gaurav Gill Dhrumil Patel	2024	Adrien Escoffier, Boris Maillard, Enzo Polias, Julien Lebeau, Ben Hallgren, Delvintor Alfarizi,	
4	Indewheelers	Vikram Dhar Ajay Agrawal	2025	Maxime Desprey, Greg Aranda, Mickael Lamarque, Calvin Fonvieille, Ikshan Shanbhag, Witsarut Salangam	New franchisee
5	Tricolor KTM Racing	Pradeep Lala	2025	Adrien Malaval, Paul Haberland, Hugo Manzato, Jack Nunn, Rugved Barguje, Diva Ismayana	New franchisee
6	Reise torqRacers	Reise Moto	2024	Thomas Ramette, Joan Cros, Kyle Peters, Nico Koch, Ji Heon Song, M Zidane	

== Calendar and results ==
Round	Date	Location	Stadium	450cc International Winner	250cc International Winner	250cc India & Asia Winner
1	25-26 October	Pune	Shree Shiv Chhatrapati Sports Complex	(Australia) Matt Moss	(United States) Hunter Schlosser	(Thailand) Ben Hallgren
2	5-6 December	Hyderabad	G. M. C. Balayogi Athletic Stadium	(France) Anthony Bourdon	(France) Calvin Fonvieille	(Indonesia) Nakami Vidi Makarim
3	20-21 December	Calicut	Kozhikode Corporation EMS Stadium			

== Teams Championship ==
Pos	Team	PUN	HYD	CAL	Points
1	Gujarat Trailblazers	73	145		218
2	Indewheelers Motorsports	80	137		217
3	BigRock Motorsports SX	53	159		212
4	BB Racing	82	96		178
5	Reise torqRacers	46	98		144
6	Tricolor KTM	33	99		132
Pos	Team	PUN	HYD	CAL	Points

== 450cc International ==
=== Entry list ===
Team	No	Rider	Rounds
BigRock Motorsports SX	1	(Australia) Matt Moss	1–2
BigRock Motorsports SX	199	(United States) John Short	1–2
Reise torqRacers	6	(France) Thomas Ramette	1
Reise torqRacers	225	(France) Charles Lefrançois	2
Reise torqRacers	848	(Spain) Juan Cros Cortes	1–2
Indewheelers Motorsports	20	(France) Greg Aranda	1
Indewheelers Motorsports	72	(France) Lucas Imbert	2
Indewheelers Motorsports	141	(France) Maxime Desprey	1
Indewheelers Motorsports	384	(Italy) Lorenzo Camporese	2
BB Racing	58	(United States) Justin Rodbell	2
BB Racing	911	(France) Jordi Tixier	1
BB Racing	945	(France) Anthony Bourdon	1–2
Tricolor KTM	91	(Germany) Paul Haberland	1–2
Tricolor KTM	131	(France) Adrien Malaval	1–2
Gujarat Trailblazers	137	(France) Adrien Escoffier	1–2
Gujarat Trailblazers	727	(France) Boris Maillard	1–2

Pos	Team	PUN	HYD	CAL	Points
1	(Australia) Matt Moss	1			34
2	(France) Jordi Tixier	2			17
3	(France) Greg Aranda	3			15
4	(France) Anthony Bourdon	4	1		40
5	(France) Maxime Desprey	5			11
6	(France) Adrien Escoffier	6			28
7	(France) Boris Maillard	7			18
8	(Germany) Paul Haberland	8			13
9	(United States) John Short	9			23
10	(France) Adrien Malaval	10			13
11	(France) Thomas Ramette	11			5
12	(Spain) Juan Cros Cortes	12			4
Pos	Team	PUN	HYD	CAL	Points

== 250cc International ==
=== Entry list ===
Team	No	Rider	Rounds
Indewheelers Motorsports	11	(France) Calvin Fonvieille	1–2
Indewheelers Motorsports	22	(France) Mickaël Lamarque	1–2
Tricolor KTM	27	(France) Hugo Manzato	1–2
Tricolor KTM	29	(Australia) Jack Nunn	1–2
BigRock Motorsports SX	49	(Australia) Caleb Goullet	1–2
BigRock Motorsports SX	805	(United States) Slade Varola	1–2
BB Racing	129	(United States) Lane Shaw	1–2
BB Racing	173	(United States) Hunter Schlosser	1–2
Gujarat Trailblazers	259	(France) Julien Lebeau	1–2
Gujarat Trailblazers	335	(France) Enzo Polias	1–2
Reise torqRacers	260	(Germany) Nico Koch	1–2
Reise torqRacers	851	(France) Clément Briatte	1–2

Pos	Team	PUN	HYD	CAL	Points
1	(United States) Hunter Schlosser	1			20
2	(France) Calvin Fonvieille	2			17
3	(France) Mickaël Lamarque	3			15
4	(United States) Lane Shaw	4			13
5	(France) Julien Lebeau	5			11
6	(United States) Slade Varola	6			10
7	(France) Clément Briatte	7			9
8	(Australia) Jack Nunn	8			8
9	(Australia) Caleb Goullet	9			7
10	(France) Enzo Polias	10			6
11	(Germany) Nico Koch	11			5
	(France) Hugo Manzato	Ret			0
Pos	Team	PUN	HYD	CAL	Points

== 250cc India & Asia ==
=== Entry list ===
Team	No	Rider	Rounds
BigRock Motorsports SX	1	(Thailand) Thanarat Penjan	1–2
BigRock Motorsports SX	21	(Indonesia) Nakami Vidi Makarim	1–2
Reise torqRacers	4	(Indonesia) Mohammad Zidane	1–2
Reise torqRacers	100	(South Korea) Song Jiheon	1–2
Tricolor KTM	9	(India) Rugved Barguje	1–2
Tricolor KTM	32	(India) Prajwal Vishwanath	1–2
Gujarat Trailblazers	31	(Thailand) Ben Hallgren	1–2
Gujarat Trailblazers	325	(Indonesia) Delvintor Alfarizi	1–2
Indewheelers Motorsports	46	(India) Ikshan Shanbhag	1–2
Indewheelers Motorsports	154	(Thailand) Witsarut Salangam	1–2
BB Racing	99	(Sri Lanka) Jacques Gunawardena	1–2
BB Racing	112	(Thailand) Athison Ruadreo	1–2

Pos	Team	PUN	HYD	CAL	Points
1	(Thailand) Ben Hallgren	1			20
2	(Indonesia) Delvintor Alfarizi	2			17
3	(Thailand) Witsarut Salangam	3			15
4	(Indonesia) Mohammad Zidane	4			13
5	(Thailand) Athison Ruadreo	5			11
6	(South Korea) Song Jiheon	6			10
7	(Thailand) Thanarat Penjan	7			9
8	(Sri Lanka) Jacques Gunawardena	8			8
9	(India) Ikshan Shanbhag	9			7
10	(India) Prajwal Vishwanath	10			6
11	(India) Rugved Barguje	11			5
	(Indonesia) Nakami Vidi Makarim	Ret			0
Pos	Team	PUN	HYD	CAL	Points
