= Indian Supercross Racing League =

Indian motorcycle racing league

- Category: 2W Supercross
- Country: India
- Inaugural season: 2024
- Teams: 6
- Teams' champion: BigRock Motorsports
- Official website: https://indiansupercrossleague.com/

Indian Supercross Racing League (ISRL) is an Indian motorcycle racing league is a franchise-based supercross league organised by Team SXI in collaboration with the Federation of Motor Sports Clubs of India (FMSCI).

Most of the other leagues in India are city-based. The Season 2 of the 2025 Indian Supercross Racing League (ISRL) was held from October to December 2025. BigRock Motorsports retained the title in Season 2 at the finale in Kozhikode on 21 December 2025.

CEAT is the main sponsor of ISRL while Toyota Hilux is the official vehicle partner for Season1. Frenchman, Jordi Tixier, a former World Motocross Champion (2018) won three races in the inaugural ISRL Round 1 held at Pune on 28 January 2024. BigRock Motorsports won the team championship table after three rounds.

The first round of the inaugural season was scheduled to begin at the Jawaharlal Nehru Stadium in New Delhi followed by another three rounds in Mumbai, Pune and Ahmedabad from October to December 2023. However, the calendar was cut short and the first round was successfully held at Pune on 28 January 2024. The second round was held at Ahmedabad. Big Rock Motorsports was leading the team championship after two rounds and later won the inaugural title.

The final round scheduled to be held at Delhi was shifted to Bengaluru due the farmers' strike in Delhi. Bollywood actor Arjun Kapoor launched the ISRL on 1 June 2023 in New Delhi. Earlier in November 2022, fmsci vice-president Gautam Shanthappa announced that the federation has signed an MoU granting rights to Team SXI. Popular bollywood actor Salman Khan is named as the brand ambassador for Season 2.

Former Supercross international racers brothers Eeshan Lokhande and Aashwin Lokhande, along with Veer Patel formed Supercross India Private Limited (Team SXI), the parent company of ISRL, which organises the events. The opening of rider registrations were announced on 20 July 2023 in Pune for the inaugural league.

== Format ==
The first of the four categories will be the 450cc category, the premier class of supercross racing globally (this class is open only for international riders in the opening season). There are two 250cc categories one for international riders and a separate category for Indian and Asian riders. Another 85cc category for riders between 11 and 14 years was planned but later scrapped.

== Teams ==
The first team to acquire the franchise rights is BB Racing, owned by former racer Atul Chordia's Panchshil Reality of Pune. SG Sports, the sports branch of APL Apollo Group, became the second franchise team, headed by Sanjay Gupta, CMD. Dhrumil Patel, a Vadodara-based entrepreneur, along with Indian motorsport rally driver Arjuna Awardee Gaurav Gill have acquired the franchise rights for Gujarat Trailblazers, the third ISRL team. BigRock Motorsport has been announced as the fourth franchise team for ISRL. Popular Supercross Indian champion and the first Indian rider to complete Dakar Rally, CS Santosh will be heading the BigRock team.

Team	owner	Debut	Notes
Honda BB Racing	Panchshil Realty	2024	
BigRock Motorsports SX	BigRock Dirt Park; CS Santosh	2024	Season 1 winner
Gujarat Trailblazers	Gaurav Gill; Dhrumil Patel	2024	
Indewheelers	Vikram Dhar; Ajay Agrawal	2025	
Tricolor KTM Racing Team	Pradeep Lala	2025	
reise TorqRacers	reise Moto	2024	
PBG Ducati Legacy Racing	Punit Balan Group Legacy Motors	2026	

=== Former teams ===
Team	Debut	Dissolved	Owner
SG Speed Racers	2024	2024	SG Sports
Mohite's Racing Team	2024	2024	Abhishek Mohite

== History ==
One of the first Stadium motocross events was held in Los Angeles Coliseum in 1972, Jaipur hosted India's first stadium motocross event in 1977. Later in 1988, Pune hosted the inaugural round of the 250cc Rodil Trophy Stadium Motocross World Championship at the Jawaharlal Nehru Stadium. The Indian Grand Prix races for the 125cc and 250cc classes, were also held along with the Rodil Trophy, More recently, the Pune Invitational Supercross held five editions till 2019. The Indian Federation, fmsci, also conducts the MRF MoGrip National Supercross Championship annually.
