= Harith Noah =

Indian professional motorsports athlete

Harith Noah (born 29 January 1993 in Germany) is a professional motorsports athlete from Shoranur in Kerala, India. He won a class in the Dakar rally in 2024. He took a historic victory for India in the Rally 2 category of Motorcycles at the 46th Dakar Rally on 19 January 2024 and finished in overall 11th place to become the fastest from India at Dakar. Earlier in 2024, he bagged two stage wins in his class, the Rally 2.

== Early life and education ==
Noah hails from Kullappully, Shoranur, Kerala. He studied at KVR High School in Vaniamkulam till Class 7. He then joined Sholai School, a boarding school in Kodaikanal in Tamil Nadu. His father, Mohammed Rafi Koitha Veettil is a businessman and his mother, Susanne, a German, is an artiste and farmer. He is a graduate of Manchester Metropolitan University with a bachelor's degree in Sports Science.

== Early career ==
Noah started racing local dirt track events at the age of 16, in 2009. Later, in 2011 he started taking part in the MRF Mogrip National supercross championship. In 2012, he did a 3-month training course in US. He won the title the same year and was recruited by TVS Factory Racing in 2012.

== Motorsport career ==
=== Domestic career ===
Noah is a five-time Indian National Supercross champion. He raced and won his first National Supercross title in 2011 in the SX2 category as a privateer. He was recruited by TVS Racing in 2012. and won four more national championships in the years, 2012, 2014, 2017, and 2018.

=== Dakar ===
Noah represents India in international cross country rallies such as the Dakar Rally and is the third rider from India to finish the Dakar rally successfully after C.S. Santosh and Aravind K.P.

On 19 January 2024, Noah won the Rally 2 category in bikes astride a TVS Sherco 450SEF Rally at Dakar 2024. In 2025 and 2026, he crashed out in the prologue and first Stage, respectively. From then on he regularly took part in the Rally Raid endurance event in motorcycles category and became the first Indian to win a class in 2024.

Since 2018, Noah is taking part in cross-country rallies and made his debut at Dakar in 2020, the inaugural year when Dakar moved to Saudi Arabia, and finished the Dakar Rally in the 'Dakar Experience' Category. In 2021, he completed the Dakar Rally, rated as the world's toughest cross-country rally raid endurance event. He became the first cross-country motorsports athlete representing India to have finished in the top-20. He is the fastest rider from India at Dakar with a highest ranking of P11 in 2024 beating his own P18 in a Dakar stage in 2022. Earlier, he finished P19 in 2021. He competed in seven Dakar Rallies and is one of the four Indians to have taken part in Dakar.

Earlier, Noah beat CS Santosh record of P34, finishing Dakar in P20 on 15 January 2021, when he first completed the marathon course. Taking part in his third Dakar in 2022, he survived two falls and fractured ribs by Stage 9 and later completed the rally in Dakar Experience class. He entered as a privateer supported by TVS Racing factory team and was serviced by Sherco TVS Rally Factory team which has a tie-up with TVS Motor Company. He remains the best from India at Dakar with a record of 11th Overall place in 2024.

In 2023, Noah suffered a serious spinal injury, but fortunately for him, it was a stable T5 fracture, that healed through rest for over three months.

In 2025, Noah crashed in the prologue on the very first day.

After finishing the 22-km prologue successfully, Noah met with a bad crash in Special Stage 1 on 4 January 2026. He fractured hisT5, T6 and T8 vertebrae and a rib.

Noah trained at the Red Bull Athlete Performance Centre and then at USA preparing for his fifth Dakar which was held from 5 to 19 January 2024. At the half-way stage after finishing six stages, including the tough 48-hour Chrono stage, Noah is placed 13th in the overall general rankings for Bike category. He is placed third in the Rally2 class. He went on to win the Rally 2 category of Motorcycles at the 46th Dakar Rally.

=== International ===
Noah won his first international rally when he finished first in his class B1 (Bikes under 450cc) at TransAnatolia Rally which ran from 2 to 9 September 2023 in Turkey. He finished overall 4th. He then finished 15th at the Rallye du Maroc.

In 2018, Noah raced his first-ever international cross-country race, the Rallye Du Maroc. In 2019, he participated in Baja Aragon and finished seventh overall. In 2020,

In July 2022, Noah competed in the FIM Baja Spain Aragon, the fourth round of the FIM Bajas World Cup and finished a creditable fourth behind his Sherco TVS Factory teammates Lorenzo Santolino and Rui Goncalves.

== Charity run ==
Noah supports research related to spinal cord injuries. He took part in the Wings for Life World Run, a charity run organised by Wings for Life Foundation in 2022. He joined the Run again in 2023 at Mumbai and also roped in his friend Rahul KP, a national football player.

== Awards ==
2024: Noah received the FMSCI Special Award at the Annual Awards gala 2023 held in Chennai on 21 February 2024.
