= 2021 FIA World Cup for Cross-Country Bajas =

2021 FIA World Cup for Cross-Country Bajas
Previous:	2020	Next:	2022

The 2021 FIA World Cup for Cross-Country Bajas is the third season of the reformed FIA World Cup for Cross-Country Bajas; an annual competition for baja-style rally raid events for cars, buggies, and side-by-sides held in multiple countries.

== Calendar ==
The initial calendar for the 2021 world cup featured nine cross-country baja events. The final five rounds are also part of the FIA European Cup for Cross-Country Bajas. Some events on the schedule are shared with the 2021 FIM Bajas World Cup.

Round	Dates	Rally name
1	4–7 February	Baja Russia - Northern Forest
2	18–20 February	(United Arab Emirates) Dubai International Baja
3	4–6 March	(Saudi Arabia) Sharqiyah Baja
4	18–20 March	Jordan Baja
5	23–24 July	(Spain) Baja España Aragón
6	5–8 August	(Hungary) Hungarian Baja
7	26–29 August	Baja Poland
8	9–12 September	(Italy) 28º Italian Baja
9	28–30 October	(Portugal) Baja Portalegre 500

== Regulation ==
The following groups and classes are allowed:

- T1 - Prototype Cross-Country Vehicles
  - T1.1 - T1 4x4 - Petrol and Diesel
  - T1.2 - T1 4x2 - Petrol and Diesel
- T2 - Series Production Cross-Country Vehicles - Petrol and Diesel
- T3 - Lightweight Prototypes Cross-Country Vehicles
- T4 - Lightweight Series Production Cross-Country Side-by-Side Vehicles

The FIA awards the world cup to drivers, co-drivers, teams, T3 and T4 drivers and T4 teams.

== Notable teams and drivers ==
T1 Teams & Drivers
Constructor	Car	Team	Driver	Co-driver	Rounds
BMW	BMW X3	VRT	(Russia) Validimir Vasilyev	(Russia) Alexsey Kuzmich	1
BMW	BMW X3	MSK Rally Team	(Russia) Denis Krotov	(Russia) Konstantin Zhiltsov	1
BMW	BMW X5		(Poland) Wlodzimierz Grajek	(Poland) Szymon Marciniak	6–7
BMW	BMW X6 RR	Varga Racing Team ASE	(Hungary) Imre Varga	(Hungary) Jószef Toma	8
Century	Century CR6	SMC Junior Motorsport	(Spain) Jesus Calleja	(Argentina) Eduardo Blanco	5
Chevrolet	Chevrolet Silverado		(United Arab Emirates) Khalid Aljafla	(United Arab Emirates) Ali Mirza	2
Ford	Ford F150 EVO	OffroadSport	(Czech Republic) Miroslav Zapletal	(Slovakia) Marek Sykora	3, 5–8
Ford	Ford F150	NAC Rally Team	(Poland) Pawel Molgo	(Poland) Maciej Marton	5–6
Ford	Ford EXR 5 PROTO	PRK Sport Rally Team	(Portugal) Pedro Dias Da Silva	(Portugal) José Sa	5, 7
Ford	Ford EXR 5 PROTO	PRK Sport Rally Team	(Portugal) Pedro Dias Da Silva	(Portugal) José Janela	8
Ford	Ford EXR 5 PROTO	PRK Sport Rally Team	(Portugal) Edgar Condenso	(Portugal) Antonio Serrão	5, 7
Ford	Ford Ranger		(Spain) Santiago Carnicer	(Spain) Miguel Lázaro	5
GAZ	GAZelle NEXT	Gaz Raid Sport	(Russia) Alexey Ignatov	(Russia) Evgeny Pavlov	1
GAZ	GAZ	Gaz Raid Sport	(Russia) Evgenii Sukhovenko	(Russia) Kirill Chapaev	1
G-Force	G-Force BARS	G-Force Motorsport	(Russia) Andrey Novikov	(Russia) Vladimir Novikov	1
G-Force	G-Force BARS	NG-Energo	(Russia) Andrey Rudskoy	(Russia) Evgenii Zagorodniuk	1
G-Force	G-Force BARS	NG-Energo	(Russia) Andrey Rudskoy	(Russia) Andrei Rudnitsky	5
Mini	Mini John Cooper Works Rally	Race World	(Saudi Arabia) Yasir Seaidan	(Russia) Alexsey Kuzmich	2–4
Mini	Mini John Cooper Works Rally	X-Raid Team	(Saudi Arabia) Yasir Seaidan	(Russia) Alexsey Kuzmich	5–8
Mini	Mini John Cooper Works Rally	X-Raid Team	(Poland) Krzysztof Hołowczyc	(Poland) Lukasz Kurzeja	5–8
Mini	Mini John Cooper Works Rally	X-Raid Team	(Poland) Michal Maluszynski	(Poland) Julita Maluszynska	8
Mini	Mini John Cooper Works Rally		(Poland) Michal Maluszynski	(Poland) Julita Maluszynska	6–7
Mini	Mini John Cooper Works Rally	X-Raid	(Russia) Denis Krotov	(Russia) Konstantin Zhiltsov	2
Mini	Mini John Cooper Works Rally	MSK Rally Team	(Russia) Denis Krotov	(Russia) Konstantin Zhiltsov	7
Mini	Mini John Cooper Works Rally		(Portugal) Alejandro Martins	(Portugal) José Marques	5
Mini	Mini All4 Racing	X-Raid Team	(Sweden) Mattias Ekström	(Sweden) Emil Bergkvist	5
Mini	Mini All4 Racing	X-Raid Team	(Germany) Jutta Kleinschmidt	(Germany) Philipp Beier	5
Mitsubishi	Mitsubishi Pajero		(Italy) Cesare Rickler	(Italy) Fontana Sacchetti	8
Nissan	Nissan NP300 Pick Up	Uspenskiy Rally Tecnica	(Russia) Sergey Uspenskiy	(Russia) Marina Danilova	1
Nissan	Nissan Navara	Sabertooth Motoring Adventure	(United Arab Emirates) Thomas Bell	(United Arab Emirates) Patrick McMurren	2
Nissan	Nissan Pickup		(Saudi Arabia) Khaled Al-Feraihi	(Saudi Arabia) Omar Al-Lahim	2–3
Nissan	Nissan Pickup		(United Arab Emirates) Yahya Al Helei	(United Arab Emirates) Khalid Alkendi	2
Nissan	Nissan Navara VK56		(Germany) Markus Walcher	(Germany) Stephan Stensky	7
Peugeot	Peugeot 3008 DKR	Abu Dhabi Racing	(United Arab Emirates) Khalid Al Qassimi	(Germany) Dirk Von Zitzewitz	2
Porsche	Porsche Macan	LP Racing KFT.	(Hungary) Pál Lónyai	(Hungary) Attila Csató	5–6, 8
Prodrive	Prodrive Hunter	Bahrain Raid Xtreme	(Spain) Nani Roma	(Spain) Alex Haro	5
Prodrive	Prodrive Hunter	Bahrain Raid Xtreme	(France) Sébastien Loeb	(Belgium) Fabian Lurquin	5
Prodrive	Prodrive Hunter	Bahrain Raid Xtreme	(Argentina) Orlando Terranova	(Spain) Daniel Oliveras	5
Suzuki	Suzuki Gran Vitara		(Italy) Emilio Ferroni	(Italy) Daniele Fiorini	8
Toyota	Toyota LC200	Novgorod Autosport	(Russia) Aldis Vilcans	(Russia) Aleksandr Gorkov	1
Toyota	Toyota Hilux Overdrive	Overdrive SA	(Saudi Arabia) Yazeed Al Rajhi	(United Kingdom) Michael Orr	2–3, 5–8
Toyota	Toyota Hilux Overdrive	Overdrive SA	(Netherlands) Erik Van Loon	(France) Sebastien Delaunay	3–5, 8
Toyota	Toyota Hilux Overdrive	Overdrive SA	(France) Ronan Chabot	(France) Gilles Pillot	4
Toyota	Toyota Hilux Overdrive	Overdrive SA	(Qatar) Nasser Al-Attiyah	(France) Mathieu Baumel	5
Toyota	Toyota Hilux Overdrive	Overdrive SA	(Portugal) Tiago Reis	(Portugal) Valter Cardoso	5, 8
Toyota	Toyota Hilux Overdrive	Overdrive SA	(Spain) Isidre Esteve	(Spain) Txema Villalobos	5
Toyota	Toyota Hilux Overdrive	Overdrive SA	(Spain) Xavier Pons	(Spain) Armand Monleon	8
Toyota	Toyota Hilux Overdrive		(Portugal) João Ferreira	(Portugal) David Monteiro	5
Toyota	Toyota Hilux Overdrive	R Team - Ralliart Off Road Italy	(Italy) Sergio Galletti	(Italy) Giulia Maroni	8
Toyota	Toyota Hilux Overdrive		(Italy) Riccardo Colombo	(Italy) Massimiliano Catarsi	8
Toyota	Toyota Hilux		(Portugal) João Ramos	(Portugal) Filipe Palmeiro	5
Toyota	Toyota Hilux	Escuderia Team Repauto	(Spain) Felix Macias	(Spain) Jose Luis Conde	5
Toyota	Toyota Hilux	Inbank Toyota Gazoo Racing	(Lithuania) Benediktas Vanagas	(Portugal) Filipe Palmeiro	7–8
Toyota	Toyota Hilux		(Greece) Evangelos Bersis	(Greece) Panagiotis Kalfas	8
Toyota	Toyota ORD 150	4x4 Centrum Ermelo	(Netherlands) Rik van den Brink	(Netherlands) Gydo Heimans	7
Toyota	Toyota DKR 150	4x4 Centrum Ermelo	(Netherlands) Ronald Schoolderman	(Netherlands) Mark Salomons	7
Volkswagen	Volkswagen Polo 86C-C	PRK Sport Rally Team	(Portugal) Pedro Dias Da Silva	(Portugal) José Sa	6
T3 Teams & Drivers
Constructor	Car	Team	Driver	Co-driver	Rounds
BRP	VM Competicion	Automovil Club Alcalans	(Spain) Enrique Reyes	(Spain) Daniel Conde	5
Can-Am	Can-Am Maverick X3		(Russia) Anastasiya Nifontova	(Russia) Ekaterina Zhadanova	1
Can-Am	Can-Am Maverick X3	Team Maria Oparina	(Uzbekistan) Anvar Ergashev	(Russia) Andrei Rudnitski	1
Can-Am	Can-Am Maverick X3	Team Maria Oparina	(Russia) Yuriy Arshanskiy	(Russia) Aleksandr Andreev	1
Can-Am	Can-Am Maverick X3	SHERO Rally Team by Duust	(Saudi Arabia) Dania Akeel	(France) Laurent Lichtleuchter	3
Can-Am	Can-Am Maverick X3	SHERO Rally Team by Duust	(Saudi Arabia) Dania Akeel	(France) Stephane Duple	4
Can-Am	Can-Am Maverick	CA Herrador Competicion	(Spain) Roberto Rodriguez	(Spain) Herman Rodriguez	5
Can-Am	Can-Am Maverick		(United Kingdom) Catie Munnings	(France) François Cazalet	5
Can-Am	Can-Am Maverick	South Racing Middle East	(Saudi Arabia) Mashael AlObaidan	(United Arab Emirates) Ali Mirza	5
Can-Am	Can-Am		(France) Ronald Basso	(France) Jean-Pierre Garcin	5
DPR	DPR by PRK Sport PR	PRK Sport Rally Team	(Portugal) Filipe Nascimento	(Portugal) Paulo Torres	5, 8
DPR	DPR by PRK Sport PR	PRK Sport Rally Team	(Portugal) Filipe Nascimento	(Portugal) João Serodio	7
G-Force	G-Force T3GF	G-Force Motorsport	(Russia) Boris Gadasin	(Russia) Dmitry Kozhukhov	1
G-Force	G-Force T3GF	G-Force Motorsport	(Russia) Andrey Novikov	(Russia) Dmitry Kozhukhov	5
Herrator	Herrator Inzane X3	CA Herrador Competicion	(Spain) Eduardo Eslava	(Spain) Laura Diaz	5
Herrator	Herrator HRX3	CA Herrador Competicion	(Spain) Jesus Fuster	(Spain) Pedro Lopez	8
Herrator	Herrator HRX3	Escuderia Local Sport	(Spain) Jesus Fuster	(Spain) Manuel Macho	5–7
PH-Sport	PH-Sport Zephyr		(France) Pierre Lachaume	(France) Loîc Minaudier	2
Polaris	Polaris Pro XP		(Germany) Lina Van de Mars	(Netherlands) Lisette Bakker	8
Overdrive	OT3	FN Speed Team	(Spain) Santi Navarro	(Spain) Sergi Brugué	5
Overdrive	OT3	FN Speed Team	(Spain) Santi Navarro	(Spain) Marc Solà	6–8
Overdrive	OT3	Overdrive SA	(Netherlands) Kees Koolen	(Netherlands) Mirjam Pol	7
Polaris	Polaris RZR XP Turbo		(Lebanon) Michel Fadel	(United Arab Emirates) Craig Tyson	2
RM Sport	RM Sport Mamba		(Saudi Arabia) Dania Akeel	(France) Charles Cuypers	6
RM Sport	RM Sport Mamba		(Saudi Arabia) Dania Akeel	(France) Stephane Duple	7–8
T4 Teams & Drivers
Constructor	Car	Team	Driver	Co-driver	Rounds
Can-Am	Can-Am Maverick X3		(France) Claude Fournier	(France) Sebastien Delaunay	1
Can-Am	Can-Am Maverick		(France) Claude Fournier	(France) Laurent Lichtleuchter	5–8
Can-Am	Can-Am Maverick	South Racing	(France) Claude Fournier	(Poland) Szymon Gospodarczyk	2–4
Can-Am	Can-Am Maverick	South Racing	(Spain) Laia Sanz	(Spain) Lucas Cruz	2
Can-Am	Can-Am Maverick	South Racing	(Kuwait) Mshari Althefiri	(United Arab Emirates) Ali Hassan Obaid	2
Can-Am	Can-Am Maverick	South Racing	(Kuwait) Mshari Althefiri	(Qatar) Nasser Al-Kuwari	3–8
Can-Am	Can-Am Maverick	South Racing	(Russia) Pavel Lebedev	(Russia) Kiril Shubin	2
Can-Am	Can-Am Maverick	South Racing	(United Kingdom) Thomas Bell	(Spain) Armand Monleón	3–4
Can-Am	Can-Am Maverick	South Racing	(Qatar) Khalifa Al-Attiyah	(France) Xavier Panseri	4
Can-Am	Can-Am Maverick	South Racing	(Portugal) Alexandre Re	(Portugal) Pedro Re	5–8
Can-Am	Can-Am Maverick	South Racing	(Australia) Molly Taylor	(Germany) Dennis Zenz	5
Can-Am	Can-Am Maverick	South Racing	(Lithuania) Rokas Baciuska	(Lithuania) Mindaugas Lelys	5
Can-Am	Can-Am Maverick	South Racing	(Lithuania) Rokas Baciuska	(Spain) Armand Monleon	7
Can-Am	Can-Am Maverick	South Racing	(Netherlands) Kees Koolen	(Portugal) Pedro Santos	5
Can-Am	Can-Am Maverick	South Racing	(Uruguay) Luis Henderson	(Spain) Juan Carlos Carignani	7
Can-Am	Can-Am Maverick	South Racing	(Uruguay) Rodrigo Zeballos	(Uruguay) Sergio Lafuente	7
Can-Am	Can-Am Maverick		(Saudi Arabia) Saleh Al-Saif	(Spain) Oriol Vidal	2–5
Can-Am	Can-Am Maverick		(Saudi Arabia) Saleh Al-Saif	(France) Sebastian Delaunay	6–7
Can-Am	Can-Am Maverick		(Saudi Arabia) Saleh Al-Saif	(Russia) Kirill Shubin	8
Can-Am	Can-Am Maverick		(Saudi Arabia) Saeed Al-Mouri	(Uruguay) Sergio Lafuente	3
Can-Am	Can-Am Maverick		(Switzerland) Jerome De Sadeleer	(France) Michael Metge	5
Can-Am	Can-Am Maverick	Monster Energy Can-Am	(Spain) Gerard Farres	(Spain) Armand Monleon	5
Can-Am	Can-Am Maverick	Automovil Club Alcalans	(Spain) Miguel Valero	(Spain) Jacqueline Ricci	5, 7–8
Can-Am	Can-Am Maverick	FN Speed Team	(Spain) Gaël Queralt	(Spain) Marc Solà	5
Can-Am	Can-Am Maverick		(Ukraine) Ievgen Kovalevich	(Ukraine) Dmytro Tsyro	6
Can-Am	Can-Am Maverick	Energylandia Rally Team	(Poland) Marek Goczał	(Poland) Michał Goleniewski	7
Can-Am	Can-Am Maverick X3 XRS	Nakusi Racing Team	(Russia) Pavel Silnov	(Russia) Evgenii Zagorodniuk	6–7
Can-Am	Can-Am Maverick X3 XRS	Nakusi Racing Team	(Russia) Armen Puzian	(Russia) Evgenii Zagorodniuk	8
Can-Am	Can-Am Maverick X3 XRS	Nakusi Racing Team	(Russia) Armen Puzian	(Latvia) Oleg Uperenko	7
VM	VM	Automovil Club Alcalans	(Spain) Miguel Valero	(Spain) Jacqueline Ricci	6
Yamaha	Yamaha YXZ 1000R		(Italy) Amerigo Ventura	(Italy) Angelo Montico	5–6
Yamaha	Yamaha YXZ 1000R		(Italy) Amerigo Ventura	(Italy) Mirko Brun	7–8

== Results ==
=== Overall ===
Round	Rally name	Podium finishers			
Round	Rally name	Rank	Driver	Car	Time
1	Baja Russia - Northern Forest	1	(Russia) Vladimir Vasilyev (Russia) Alexey Kuzmich	BMW X3	5:37:58
1	Baja Russia - Northern Forest	2	(Russia) Andrey Novikov (Russia) Vladimir Novikov	G-Force BARS	5:46:27
1	Baja Russia - Northern Forest	3	(Russia) Boris Gadasin (Russia) Dmitry Kozhukhov	G-Force T3GF (T3)	6:10:54
2	(United Arab Emirates) Dubai International Baja	1	(Saudi Arabia) Yazeed Al Rajhi (United Kingdom) Michael Orr	Toyota Hilux Overdrive	5:22:13
2	(United Arab Emirates) Dubai International Baja	2	(United Arab Emirates) Khalid Al Qassimi (Germany) Dirk Von Zitzewitz	Peugeot 3008 DKR	5:56:02
2	(United Arab Emirates) Dubai International Baja	3	(Saudi Arabia) Yasir Seaidan (Russia) Alexey Kuzmich	Mini John Cooper Works Rally	6:00:07
3	(Saudi Arabia) Sharqiyah Baja	1	(Saudi Arabia) Yasir Seaidan (Russia) Alexey Kuzmich	Mini John Cooper Works Rally	4:05:27
3	(Saudi Arabia) Sharqiyah Baja	2	(Czech Republic) Miroslav Zapletal (Slovakia) Marek Sykora	Ford F150 EVO	4:19:05
3	(Saudi Arabia) Sharqiyah Baja	3	(Saudi Arabia) Saleh Al-Saif (Spain) Oriol Vidal	Can-Am Maverick X3 (T4)	4:27:37
4	Jordan Baja	1	(Saudi Arabia) Yasir Seaidan (Russia) Alexey Kuzmich	Mini John Cooper Works Rally	6:37:51
4	Jordan Baja	2	(Netherlands) Eric Van Loon (France) Sebastien Delaunay	Toyota Hilux Overdrive	6:43:15
4	Jordan Baja	3	(France) Ronan Chabot (France) Gilles Pillot	Toyota Hilux Overdrive	6:54:31
5	(Spain) Baja España Aragón	1	(Qatar) Nasser Al-Attiyah (France) Mathieu Baumel	Toyota Hilux Overdrive	6:32:44
5	(Spain) Baja España Aragón	2	(Sweden) Mattias Ekström (Sweden) Emil Bergkvist	Mini All4 Racing	6:37:24
5	(Spain) Baja España Aragón	3	(Saudi Arabia) Yazeed Al Rajhi (United Kingdom) Michael Orr	Toyota Hilux Overdrive	6:38:59
6	(Hungary) Hungarian Baja	1	(Poland) Krzysztof Hołowczyc (Poland) Łukasz Kurzeja	Mini John Cooper Works Rally	4:56:28
6	(Hungary) Hungarian Baja	2	(Saudi Arabia) Yazeed Al Rajhi (United Kingdom) Michael Orr	Toyota Hilux Overdrive	4:56:28
6	(Hungary) Hungarian Baja	3	(Saudi Arabia) Yasir Seaidan (Russia) Alexey Kuzmich	Mini John Cooper Works Rally	5:10:22
7	Baja Poland	1	(Poland) Krzysztof Hołowczyc (Poland) Łukasz Kurzeja	Mini John Cooper Works Rally	4:53:01
7	Baja Poland	2	(Saudi Arabia) Yazeed Al Rajhi (United Kingdom) Michael Orr	Toyota Hilux Overdrive	5:03:44
7	Baja Poland	3	(Lithuania) Benediktas Vanagas (Portugal) Filipe Palmeiro	Toyota Hilux	5:07:49
8	(Italy) 28º Italian Baja	1	(Saudi Arabia) Yazeed Al Rajhi (United Kingdom) Michael Orr	Toyota Hilux Overdrive	5:02:47
8	(Italy) 28º Italian Baja	2	(Portugal) Tiago Reis (Portugal) Valter Cardoso	Toyota Hilux Overdrive	5:05:50
8	(Italy) 28º Italian Baja	3	(Lithuania) Benediktas Vanagas (Portugal) Filipe Palmeiro	Toyota Hilux	5:13:34
9	(Portugal) Baja Portalegre 500	1	(Poland) Krzysztof Hołowczyc (Poland) Łukasz Kurzeja	Mini John Cooper Works Rally	5:09:44
9	(Portugal) Baja Portalegre 500	2	(Portugal) Tiago Reis (Portugal) Valter Cardoso	Toyota Hilux	5:10:59
9	(Portugal) Baja Portalegre 500	3	(Brazil) Lucas Moraes (Brazil) Kaique Bentivoglio	Toyota Hilux Overdrive	5:17:18

=== T3 ===
Round	Rally name	Podium finishers			
Round	Rally name	Rank	Driver	Car	Time
1	Baja Russia - Northern Forest	1	(Russia) Boris Gadasin (Russia) Dmitry Kozhukhov	G-Force T3GF	6:10:54
1	Baja Russia - Northern Forest	2	(Russia) Anastasiya Nifontova (Russia) Ekaterina Zhadanova	Can-Am Maverick X3	6:28:04
1	Baja Russia - Northern Forest	3	(Uzbekistan) Anvar Ergashev (Russia) Andrei Rudnitski	Can-Am Maverick X3	7:21:11
2	(United Arab Emirates) Dubai International Baja	1	(France) Pierre Lachaume (France) Loîc Minaudier	PH-Sport Zephyr	6:18:53
2	(United Arab Emirates) Dubai International Baja	2	(Lebanon) Michel Fadel (United Arab Emirates) Craig Tyson	Polaris RZR XP Turbo	8:11:56
3	(Saudi Arabia) Sharqiyah Baja	1	(Saudi Arabia) Dania Akeel (France) Laurent Lichtleuchter	Can-Am Maverick X3	5:49:44
4	Jordan Baja	1	(Saudi Arabia) Dania Akeel (France) Stephane Duple	Can-Am Maverick X3	10:45:20
5	(Spain) Baja España Aragón	1	(Spain) Roberto Rodriguez (Spain) Herman Rodriguez	Can-Am Maverick	7:13:14
5	(Spain) Baja España Aragón	2	(France) Ronald Basso (France) Jean-Pierre Garcin	Can-Am	7:26:00
5	(Spain) Baja España Aragón	3	(Spain) Santi Navarro (Spain) Sergi Brugué	Overdrive OT3	7:38:20
6	(Hungary) Hungarian Baja	1	(Spain) Jesus Fuster (Spain) Manuel Macho	Herrator HRX3	5:52:45
6	(Hungary) Hungarian Baja	2	(Saudi Arabia) Dania Akeel (France) Charles Cuypers	RM Sport Mamba	9:11:42
7	Baja Poland	1	(Netherlands) Kees Koolen (Netherlands) Mirjam Pol	Overdrive OT3	5:33:05
7	Baja Poland	2	(Spain) Santi Navarro (Spain) Marc Solà	Overdrive OT3	5:36:04
7	Baja Poland	3	(Saudi Arabia) Dania Akeel (France) Stephane Duple	RM Sport Mamba	7:04:11
8	(Italy) 28º Italian Baja	1	(Spain) Santi Navarro (Spain) Marc Solà	Overdrive OT3	5:35:34
8	(Italy) 28º Italian Baja	2	(Spain) Jesus Fuster (Spain) Pedro Lopez	Herrator HRX3	6:28:45
8	(Italy) 28º Italian Baja	3	(Portugal) Filipe Nascimento (Portugal) Paulo Torres	DPR by PRK Sport PR	6:32:28
9	(Portugal) Baja Portalegre 500	1	(Portugal) David Spranger (Portugal) Sebastião Dominguez	Herrator HRX3	5:55:00
9	(Portugal) Baja Portalegre 500	2	(Spain) Santi Navarro (Spain) Marc Solà	Can-Am Maverick X3	6:03:31
9	(Portugal) Baja Portalegre 500	3	(Portugal) Filipe Nascimento (Portugal) João Serôdio	DPR by PRK Sport PR	6:58:57

=== T4 ===
Round	Rally name	Podium finishers			
Round	Rally name	Rank	Driver	Car	Time
1	Baja Russia - Northern Forest	1	(France) Claude Fournier (France) Sebastien Delaunay	Can-Am Maverick X3	6:48:48
2	(United Arab Emirates) Dubai International Baja	1	(Russia) Pavel Lebedev (Russia) Kiril Shubin	Can-Am Maverick	6:48:46
2	(United Arab Emirates) Dubai International Baja	2	(Kuwait) Mshari Althefiri (United Arab Emirates) Ali Hassan Obaid	Can-Am Maverick	7:18:16
2	(United Arab Emirates) Dubai International Baja	3	(France) Claude Fournier (Poland) Szymon Gospodarczyk	Can-Am Maverick	7:33:51
3	(Saudi Arabia) Sharqiyah Baja	1	(Saudi Arabia) Saleh Al-Saif (Spain) Oriol Vidal	Can-Am Maverick X3	4:27:37
3	(Saudi Arabia) Sharqiyah Baja	2	(Kuwait) Mshari Althefiri (Qatar) Nasser Al-Kuwari	Can-Am Maverick X3	4:59:58
3	(Saudi Arabia) Sharqiyah Baja	3	(Saudi Arabia) Saeed Zaki Almouri (Uruguay) Sergio Lafuente	Can-Am Maverick X3	5:02:37
4	Jordan Baja	1	(Saudi Arabia) Saleh Al-Saif (Spain) Oriol Vidal	Can-Am Maverick X3	7:28:11
4	Jordan Baja	2	(Kuwait) Mshari Althefiri (Qatar) Nasser Al-Kuwari	Can-Am Maverick X3	8:08:35
4	Jordan Baja	3	(United Arab Emirates) Thomas Bell (Spain) Armand Monleón	Can-Am Maverick X3	8:09:00
5	(Spain) Baja España Aragón	1	(Portugal) Alexandre Re (Portugal) Pedro Re	Can-Am Maverick	7:10:35
5	(Spain) Baja España Aragón	2	(Kuwait) Mshari Althefiri (Qatar) Nasser Al-Kuwari	Can-Am Maverick	7:19:47
5	(Spain) Baja España Aragón	3	(Switzerland) Jerome De Sadeleer (France) Michael Metge	Can-Am Maverick	7:19:52
6	(Hungary) Hungarian Baja	1	(Portugal) Alexandre Re (Portugal) Pedro Re	Can-Am Maverick X3	5:35:23
6	(Hungary) Hungarian Baja	2	(Russia) Pavel Silnov (Russia) Evgenii Zagorodniuk	Can-Am Maverick X3 XRS	5:49:14
6	(Hungary) Hungarian Baja	3	(Spain) Miguel Valero (Spain) Jacqueline Ricci	VM	5:49:41
7	Baja Poland	1	(Poland) Marek Goczał (Poland) Michał Goleniewski	Can-Am Maverick	5:17:17
7	Baja Poland	2	(Portugal) Alexandre Re (Portugal) Pedro Re	Can-Am Maverick	5:26:44
7	Baja Poland	3	(Saudi Arabia) Saleh Al-Saif (France) Sebastien Delaunay	Can-Am Maverick	5:31:17
8	(Italy) 28º Italian Baja	1	(Saudi Arabia) Saleh Al-Saif (Russia) Kirill Shubin	Can-Am Maverick	5:26:37
8	(Italy) 28º Italian Baja	2	(Portugal) Alexandre Re (Portugal) Pedro Re	Can-Am Maverick	5:26:43
8	(Italy) 28º Italian Baja	3	(Italy) Amerigo Ventura (Italy) Mirko Brun	Yamaha YXZ 1000R	5:31:15
9	(Portugal) Baja Portalegre 500	1	(Portugal) Alexandre Re (Portugal) Pedro Re	Can-Am Maverick	5:24:16
9	(Portugal) Baja Portalegre 500	2	(Italy) Amerigo Ventura (Italy) Mirko Brun	Yamaha YXZ 1000R	5:45:30
9	(Portugal) Baja Portalegre 500	3	(Spain) Eduard Pons (Spain) Oriol Mena	Can-Am Maverick	5:57:01

== Championship standings ==
Points system

- Points for final positions are awarded as per the following table:

Position	1st	2nd	3rd	4th	5th	6th	7th	8th	9th	10th
Overall points	25	18	15	12	10	8	6	4	2	1
Leg Points	1.5	1	.5	0						

For the 2021 season points will be awarded to the top three finishing positions of each leg on each event. These points will only be awarded if the driver finishes in the overall classification of each event. If they do not then no leg points are awarded, but the following vehicles will not move up a position for leg points.

=== FIA World Cup for Drivers, Co-Drivers, and Teams ===
==== Drivers' & Co-Drivers' championships ====
Pos	Driver	RUS (Russia)	DUB (United Arab Emirates)	SAU (Saudi Arabia)	JOR (Jordan)	ESP (Spain)	HUN (Hungary)	POL (Poland)	ITA (Italy)	POR (Portugal)	Points
1	(Saudi Arabia) Yazeed Al Rajhi		1^{28}	Ret		3^{15}	2^{20.5}	2^{19}	1^{25}	10^{1}	108.5
2	(Saudi Arabia) Yasir Seaidan		3^{16.5}	1^{26.5}	1^{27.5}	52	3^{16}	4^{12.5}	Ret	11	99
3	(Poland) Krzysztof Hołowczyc					Ret	1^{27.5}	1^{26.5}	14^{1.5}	1^{26.5}	82
4	(Czech Republic) Miroslav Zapletal			2^{19}		12	4^{12}	5^{10}	5^{10}		51
5	(Portugal) Tiago Reis					4^{12.5}			2^{19}	2^{19}	50.5
6	(Netherlands) Erik Van Loon			7^{6}	2^{20}	6^{8}			4^{12.5}		46.5
7	(Saudi Arabia) Saleh Alsaif		12	3^{15.5}	4^{12}	Ret	13	8^{4}	6^{8}	31	39.5
8	(Kuwait) Mshari Althefiri		6^{8}	4^{12}	5^{10}	22	10^{1}	12	Ret		31
9	(Lithuania) Benediktas Vanagas							3^{15}	3^{15}		30
10	(Russia) Vladimir Vasilyev	1^{29}									29
11	(Qatar) Nasser Al-Attiyah					1^{27.5}					27.5
12	(France) Claude Fournier	8^{4}	7^{6}	6^{8}	7^{6}	Ret	Ret	20	20		24
13	(Portugal) Alexandre Re					16	6^{8}	7^{6}	7^{6}	9^{2}	22
14	(Russia) Andrey Novikov	2^{21.5}				56					21.5
15	(United Arab Emirates) Khalid Al Qassimi		2^{19.5}								19.5
16	(Sweden) Mattias Ekström					2^{19.5}					19.5
17	(France) Ronan Chabot				3^{16.5}						16.5
18	(Brazil) Lucas Moraes									3^{15.5}	15.5
19	(Russia) Boris Gadasin	3^{15}									15
20	(Portugal) Miguel Barbosa									4^{12}	12
21	(France) Pierre Lachaume		4^{12}								12
22	(Russia) Evgenii Sukhovenko	4^{12}									12
23	(Brazil) Cristian Baumgart									5^{10}	10
24	(Portugal) Pedro Dias Da Silva					11	5^{10}	Ret	13	13	10
25	(Russia) Pavel Lebedev		5^{10}								10
26	(Russia) Anastasiya Nifontova	5^{10}									10
27	(Spain) Nani Roma					5^{10}					10
28	(Saudi Arabia) Saeed Almouri			5^{10}							10
29	(United Arab Emirates) Thomas Bell		10^{1}	Ret	6^{8}						9
30	(Brazil) Marcos Baumgart									6^{8}	8
31	(Poland) Marek Goczał							6^{8}			8
32	(Russia) Andrey Rudskoy	6^{8}				Ret					8
33	(Saudi Arabia) Dania Akeel			8^{4}	8^{4}		14	21	19		8
34	(France) Sébastien Loeb					7^{7.5}					7.5
35	(Russia) Andrei Ignatov	7^{6}									6
36	(Portugal) Helder Oliveira									7^{6}	6
37	(Russia) Pavel Silnov						7^{6}	14			6
38	(Lebanon) Michel Fadel		8^{4}								4
39	(Portugal) Nuno Matos									8^{4}	4
40	(Portugal) João Ramos					8^{4}				12	4
41	(Spain) Miguel Valero					28	8^{4}	18	16	28	4
42	(Italy) Amerigo Ventura					31	11	16	8^{4}	15	4
43	(Qatar) Khalifa Al Attiyah				9^{2}						2
44	(Spain) Jesus Fuster					55	9^{2}	Ret	17	Ret	2
45	(Netherlands) Kees Koolen					30		9^{2}			2
46	(Portugal) Alejandro Martins					9^{2}				Ret	2
47	(Spain) Santi Navarro					33	Ret	11	9^{2}	21	2
48	(Spain) Laia Sanz		9^{2}								2
49	(Russia) Aldis Vilcans	9^{2}									2
50	(Russia) Denis Krotov	11^{1}	DNS					10^{1}			2
51	(Uzbekistan) Anvar Ergashev	10^{1}									1
52	(Portugal) João Ferreira					10^{1}				Ret	1
53	(Spain) Xavier Pons								10^{1}		1
54	(Russia) Sergey Uspenskiy	13^{0.5}									0.5
	(Poland) Michal Maluszynski						Ret	Ret	11		0
	(Saudi Arabia) Khaled Al-Feraihi		11	Ret							0
	(Hungary) Pál Lónyai					Ret	Ret		12	Ret	0
	(Ukraine) Ievgen Kovalevich						12				0
	(Poland) Włodzimierz Grajek					51	Ret	13			0
	(Portugal) Andre Amaral									14	0
	(Russia) Armen Puzian							19	15	22	0
	(Uruguay) Luis Henderson							15			0
	(Portugal) Francisco Barreto									16	0
	(Germany) Markus Walcher							17			0
	(Portugal) David Spranger									17	0
	(Portugal) Filipe Nascimento					47		Ret	18	32	0
	(Spain) Eduard Pons					40				18	0
	(Spain) Roberto Rodriguez					18				Ret	0
	(Portugal) David Vieira									19	0
	(Poland) Pavel Molgo					20	Ret				0
	(Portugal) Victor Conceicão									20	0
	(Portugal) Edgar Condenso					21		Ret		Ret	0
	(Uruguay) Rodrigo Zeballos							22			0
	(Portugal) César Sequeira									23	0
	(Paraguay) Andrea Lafarja					39				24	0
	(Portugal) Sérgio Vitorino									25	0
	(Portugal) Gualter Barros									26	0
	(Lithuania) Rokas Baciuska					27		Ret			0
	(Netherlands) Gert-Jan Van der Valk									27	0
	(Netherlands) Andre Thewessen									29	0
	(Lithuania) Egidijus Valeisa									30	0
	(Italy) Andrea Alfano									33	0
	(France) Stéphane Floirac									34	0
	(Luxembourg) Hugo Arellano									35	0
	(Spain) Luis Recuenco					Ret				Ret	0
	(United Arab Emirates) Khalid Aljafla		Ret								0
	(United Arab Emirates) Yahya Al Helei		Ret								0
	(Netherlands) Rik van den Brink							Ret			0
	(Netherlands) Ronald Schoolderman							Ret			0
	(Italy) Sergio Galletti								Ret		0
	(Italy) Riccardo Colombo								Ret		0
	(Italy) Emilio Ferroni								Ret		0
	(Germany) Lina Van de Mars								Ret		0
	(Hungary) Imre Varga								Ret		0
	(Greece) Evangelos Bersis								Ret		0
	(Italy) Cesare Rickler								Ret		0
	(Portugal) Ricardo Porém									Ret	0
	(Portugal) Nuno Madeira									Ret	0
	(Brazil) Adroaldo Weisheimer									Ret	0
	(Brazil) Marcos Moraes									Ret	0
	(Portugal) Lino Carapeta									Ret	0
	(Portugal) Jorge Cardoso									Ret	0
	(Portugal) Luís Dias									Ret	0
	(Spain) Alonso Daniel									Ret	0
	(Portugal) José Gameiro									Ret	0
	(Portugal) Andre Villas-Boas									Ret	0
	(Spain) Jordi Queralto									Ret	0
	(Portugal) Vitor Da Silva									Ret	0
Pos	Driver	RUS (Russia)	DUB (United Arab Emirates)	SAU (Saudi Arabia)	JOR (Jordan)	ESP (Spain)	HUN (Hungary)	POL (Poland)	ITA (Italy)	POR (Portugal)	Points

Pos	Co-Driver	RUS (Russia)	DUB (United Arab Emirates)	SAU (Saudi Arabia)	JOR (Jordan)	ESP (Spain)	HUN (Hungary)	POL (Poland)	ITA (Italy)	POR (Portugal)	Points
1	(Russia) Alexey Kuzmich	1^{29}	3^{16.5}	1^{26.5}	1^{27.5}	52	3^{16}	4^{12.5}	Ret	11	128
2	(United Kingdom) Michael Orr		1^{28}	Ret		3^{15}	2^{20.5}	2^{19}	1^{25}	10^{1}	108.5
3	(Poland) Łukasz Kurzeja					Ret	1^{27.5}	1^{26.5}	14^{1.5}	1^{25.5}	81
4	(France) Sebastien Delaunay	8^{4}		7^{6}	2^{20}	6^{8}	13	8^{4}	4^{12.5}		54.5
5	(Slovakia) Marek Sykora			2^{19}		12	4^{12}	5^{10}	5^{10}		51
6	(Portugal) Valter Cardoso					4^{12.5}			2^{19}	2^{19}	50.5
7	(Portugal) Filipe Palmeiro					8^{4}		3^{15}	3^{15}	12	34
8	(France) Mathieu Baumel					1^{27.5}					27.5
9	(Spain) Oriol Vidal		12	3^{15.5}	4^{12}	Ret					27.5
10	(Qatar) Nasser Al-Kuwari			4^{12}	5^{10}	22	10^{1}	12	Ret		23
11	(Portugal) Pedro Re					16	6^{8}	7^{6}	7^{6}	9^{2}	22
12	(Russia) Vladimir Novikov	2^{21.5}									21.5
13	(Poland) Szymon Gospodarczyk		7^{6}	6^{8}	7^{6}						20
14	(Sweden) Emil Bergkvist					2^{19.5}					19.5
15	(Germany) Dirk Von Zitzewitz		2^{19.5}								19.5
16	(Russia) Kirill Shubin		5^{10}						6^{8}	31	18
17	(France) Gilles Pillot				3^{16.5}						16.5
18	(Brazil) Kaique Bentivoglio									3^{15.5}	15.5
19	(Russia) Dmitry Kozhukhov	3^{15}				56					15
20	(Russia) Evgenii Zagorodniuk	6^{8}					7^{6}	14	15	22	14
21	(Russia) Kirill Chapaev	4^{12}									12
22	(France) Loïc Minaudier		4^{12}			46					12
23	(Portugal) Pedro Velosa									4^{12}	12
24	(Brazil) Beco Andreotti									5^{10}	10
25	(Spain) Alex Haro					5^{10}					10
26	(Uruguay) Sergio Lafuente			5^{10}				22			10
27	(Portugal) Jose Sa Pires					11	5^{10}	Ret		Ret	10
28	(Russia) Ekaterina Zhadanova	5^{10}									10
29	(Spain) Armand Monleon			Ret	6^{8}	24		Ret	10^{1}		9
30	(Brazil) Kleber Cincea									6^{8}	8
31	(Poland) Michał Goleniewski							6^{8}			8
32	(United Arab Emirates) Ali Hassan Obaid		6^{8}								8
33	(Belgium) Fabian Lurquin					7^{7.5}					7.5
34	(Portugal) Carlos Mendes									7^{6}	6
35	(Russia) Evgeny Pavlov	7^{6}									6
36	(Italy) Mirko Brun							16	8^{4}	15	4
37	(France) Stephane Duple				8^{4}			21	19		4
38	(France) Laurent Lichtleuchter			8^{4}		Ret	Ret	20	20		4
39	(Portugal) Joel Lutas									8^{4}	4
40	(Spain) Jacqueline Ricci					28	8^{4}	18	16	28	4
41	(United Arab Emirates) Craig Tyson		8^{4}								4
42	(Spain) Lucas Cruz		9^{2}								2
43	(Russia) Aleksandr Gorkov	9^{2}									2
44	(Spain) Manuel Macho					55	9^{2}	Ret			2
45	(Portugal) José Marques					9^{2}				Ret	2
46	(France) Xavier Panseri				9^{2}						2
47	(Netherlands) Mirjam Pol							9^{2}			2
48	(Spain) Marc Solà						Ret	11	9^{2}	21	2
49	(Russia) Konstantin Zhiltsov	11^{1}	DNS					10^{1}			2
50	(United Arab Emirates) Patrick McMurren		10^{1}								1
51	(Portugal) David Monteiro					10^{1}				Ret	1
52	(Russia) Andrei Rudnitski	10^{1}				Ret					1
53	(Russia) Marina Danilova	13^{0.5}									0.5
	(Italy) Angelo Montico					31	11				0
	(Poland) Julita Maluszynska						Ret	Ret	11		0
	(Saudi Arabia) Omar Al-Lahim		11	Ret							0
	(Hungary) Attila Csató					Ret	Ret		12		0
	(Ukraine) Dmytro Tsyro						12				0
	(Portugal) José Janela								13	13	0
	(Poland) Szymon Marciniak					51	Ret	13			0
	(France) Charles Cuypers						14				0
	(Portugal) Nelson Ramos									14	0
	(Spain) Juan Carlos Carignani							15			0
	(Portugal) Sergio Cerveira									16	0
	(Spain) Pedro Lopez								17	Ret	0
	(Germany) Stephan Stensky							17			0
	(Portugal) Sebastião Dominguez									17	0
	(Spain) Oriol Mena					40				18	0
	(Portugal) Paulo Torres					47			18		0
	(Spain) Herman Rodriguez					18				Ret	0
	(Latvia) Oleg Uperenko							19			0
	(Portugal) Sergio Faria									19	0
	(Poland) Maciej Marton					20	Ret				0
	(Brazil) Valeria Nacarato Geo									20	0
	(Portugal) Antonio Serrão					21		Ret			0
	(Portugal) Tânia Sequeira									23	0
	(Argentina) Eugenio Arrieta					39				24	0
	(Portugal) Rafael Lutas									25	0
	(Portugal) Francisco Esperto									26	0
	(Lithuania) Mindaugas Lelys					27					0
	(Netherlands) Branco de Lange									27	0
	(Netherlands) Mayk Thewessen									29	0
	(Lithuania) Mindaugas Varza									30	0
	(Portugal) João Serôdio							Ret		32	0
	(Spain) Sergi Brugué					33					0
	(Italy) Roberto Musi									33	0
	(Belgium) Marc Elsocht									34	0
	(Belgium) Loïc Dumont									35	0
	(United Arab Emirates) Ali Mirza		Ret			49					0
	(Spain) Sergio Peinado					Ret				Ret	0
	(United Arab Emirates) Khalid Alkendi		Ret								0
	(Netherlands) Gydo Heimans							Ret			0
	(Netherlands) Mark Salomons							Ret			0
	(Italy) Giulia Maroni								Ret		0
	(Italy) Massimiliano Catarsi								Ret		0
	(Italy) Daniele Fiorini								Ret		0
	(Netherlands) Lisette Bakker								Ret		0
	(Hungary) Jószef Toma								Ret		0
	(Greece) Panagiotis Kalfas								Ret		0
	(Italy) Fontana Sacchetti								Ret		0
	(Portugal) Luis Ramalho									Ret	0
	(Portugal) Filipe Serra									Ret	0
	(Brazil) Rafael Capoani									Ret	0
	(Brazil) Fabio Pedroso									Ret	0
	(Portugal) Rui António									Ret	0
	(Portugal) André Barras									Ret	0
	(Portugal) Pedro Cunha Rêgo									Ret	0
	(Spain) Adrian Fernandez									Ret	0
	(Portugal) António Saraiva									Ret	0
	(Hungary) Albert Horn									Ret	0
	(Portugal) Gonçalo Magalhães									Ret	0
	(Czech Republic) Petra Zemankova									Ret	0
	(France) Max Delfino									Ret	0
Pos	Driver	RUS (Russia)	DUB (United Arab Emirates)	SAU (Saudi Arabia)	JOR (Jordan)	ESP (Spain)	HUN (Hungary)	POL (Poland)	ITA (Italy)	POR (Portugal)	Points

==== Teams championships ====
Pos	Team	RUS (Russia)	DUB (United Arab Emirates)	SAU (Saudi Arabia)	JOR (Jordan)	ESP (Spain)	HUN (Hungary)	POL (Poland)	ITA (Italy)	POR (Portugal)	Points
1	(Belgium) Overdrive SA		25		43	40	18	26	43	33	228
2	(Germany) South Racing		33	43	27	12		10	27	22	174
3	X-Raid Team					18	25	40	14	33	130
4	(Russia) G-Force Motorsport	33									33
5	(Russia) VRT	25									25
6	(Russia) Nakusi Racing Team						15		4	4	23
7	Bahrain Raid Xtreme					22					22
8	(Russia) Team Maria Oparina	20									20
9	(Spain) Automovil Club Alcalans					1	12		2	2	17
10	(Spain) CA Herrador Competicion					6	10		1		17
11	(Spain) FN Speed Team								10	6	16
12	(Russia) MSK Rally Team	10									16
13	(Poland) Energylandia Rally Team							12			12
14	Monster Energy Can-Am					2					2
15	(Lithuania) MV Sport									1	1
Pos	Driver	RUS (Russia)	DUB (United Arab Emirates)	SAU (Saudi Arabia)	JOR (Jordan)	ESP (Spain)	HUN (Hungary)	POL (Poland)	ITA (Italy)	POR (Portugal)	Points

=== FIA T3 World Cup for Drivers ===
==== Drivers' championship ====
Pos	Driver	RUS (Russia)	DUB (United Arab Emirates)	SAU (Saudi Arabia)	JOR (Jordan)	ESP (Spain)	HUN (Hungary)	POL (Poland)	ITA (Italy)	POR (Portugal)	Points
1	(Saudi Arabia) Dania Akeel			1^{26.5}	1^{28}		2^{19.5}	3^{15}	4^{12}		101
2	(Spain) Santi Navarro					3^{15.5}	Ret	2^{19}	1^{26.5}	2^{19}	80
3	(Spain) Jesus Fuster					9^{2}	1^{27.5}	Ret	2^{19}		48.5
4	(Portugal) Filipe Nascimento					7^{6}		Ret	3^{15.5}	3^{15.5}	37
5	(Russia) Boris Gadasin	1^{29}									29
6	(France) Pierre Lachaume		1^{28}								28
7	(Spain) Roberto Rodriguez					1^{28}					28
8	(Netherlands) Kees Koolen							1^{26.5}			26.5
9	(Portugal) David Spranger									1^{26.5}	26.5
10	(France) Ronald Basso					2^{20}					20
11	(Lebanon) Michel Fadel		2^{20}								20
12	(Russia) Anastasiya Nifontova	2^{20}									20
13	(Uzbekistan) Anvar Ergashev	3^{15.5}									15
14	(Russia) Yuriy Arshanskiy	4^{14}									14
15	(Spain) Enrique Reyes					4^{12}					12
16	(United Kingdom) Catie Munnings					5^{10}					10
17	(Spain) Edoardo Eslava					6^{8}					8
18	(Saudi Arabia) Mashael AlObaidan					8^{4}					4
19	(Russia) Andrey Novikov					10^{1}					1
	(Germany) Lina Van de Mars								Ret		0
Pos	Driver	RUS (Russia)	DUB (United Arab Emirates)	SAU (Saudi Arabia)	JOR (Jordan)	ESP (Spain)	HUN (Hungary)	POL (Poland)	ITA (Italy)	POR (Portugal)	Points

=== FIA T4 World Cup for Drivers and Teams ===
==== Drivers' championship ====
Pos	Driver	RUS (Russia)	DUB (United Arab Emirates)	SAU (Saudi Arabia)	JOR (Jordan)	ESP (Spain)	HUN (Hungary)	POL (Poland)	ITA (Italy)	POR (Portugal)	Points
1	(Portugal) Alexandre Re					1^{27.5}	1^{28}	2^{19}	2^{19.5}	1^{26.5}	120.5
2	(Saudi Arabia) Saleh Alsaif		5^{11.5}	1^{26.5}	1^{26.5}	Ret	7^{7}	3^{15.5}	1^{26}	11^{0.5}	113.5
3	(Kuwait) Mshari Althefiri		2^{18.5}	2^{19}	2^{19.5}	2^{18.5}	4^{13}	4^{12}	Ret		100.5
4	(France) Claude Fournier	1^{29.5}	3^{16}	4^{12}	4^{12}	Ret	Ret	10^{1}	6^{8}		78.5
5	(Italy) Amerigo Ventura					10^{1}	5^{10}	7^{6}	3^{15.5}	2^{19}	51.5
6	(Spain) Miguel Valero					7^{6}	3^{15.5}	8^{4}	5^{10}	8^{4}	39.5
7	(Russia) Pavel Silnov						2^{18.5}	5^{10}			28.5
8	(Russia) Pavel Lebedev		1^{27}								27
9	(Poland) Marek Goczał							1^{26.5}			26.5
10	(Russia) Armen Puzian							9^{2}	4^{12}	5^{10}	24
11	(United Arab Emirates) Thomas Bell			Ret	3^{16.5}						16.5
12	(Switzerland) Jerome De Sadeleer					3^{15.5}					15.5
13	(Saudi Arabia) Saed Zaki Almouri			3^{15.5}							15.5
14	(Spain) Eduard Pons									3^{15}	15
15	(Spain) Laia Sanz		4^{13}								13
16	(Spain) Gerard Farres					4^{12}					12
17	(Portugal) David Vieira									4^{12}	12
18	(Qatar) Khalifa Al-Attiyah				5^{11.5}						11.5
19	(Australia) Molly Taylor					5^{10}					10
20	(Lithuania) Rokas Baciuska					6^{8}		Ret			8
21	(Portugal) Gualter Barros									6^{8}	8
22	(Uruguay) Luis Henderson							6^{8}			8
23	(Ukraine) Ievgen Kovalevich						6^{8}				8
24	(Netherlands) Gert-Jan van der Valk									7^{6}	6
25	(Spain) Gaël Queralt					8^{4}					4
26	(Netherlands) Kees Koolen					9^{2}					2
27	(Netherlands) Andre Thewessen									9^{2}	2
28	(Lithuania) Egidijus Valeisa									10^{1}	1
	(Uruguay) Rodrigo Zeballos							11			0
Pos	Driver	RUS (Russia)	DUB (United Arab Emirates)	SAU (Saudi Arabia)	JOR (Jordan)	ESP (Spain)	HUN (Hungary)	POL (Poland)	ITA (Italy)	POR (Portugal)	Points

==== Teams championship ====
Pos	Driver	RUS (Russia)	DUB (United Arab Emirates)	SAU (Saudi Arabia)	JOR (Jordan)	ESP (Spain)	HUN (Hungary)	POL (Poland)	ITA (Italy)	POR (Portugal)	Points
1	(Germany) South Racing		43	43	43	43		33	43	40	129
2	(Russia) Nakusi Racing Team						25	20	15	18	78
3	(Spain) Automovil Club Alcalans					12	18	10	12	12	64
4	(Poland) Energylandia Rally Team							25			25
5	Monster Energy Can-Am					15					15
6	(Spain) FN Speed Team					10					10
7	(Lithuania) MV Sport									10	10
Pos	Driver	RUS (Russia)	DUB (United Arab Emirates)	SAU (Saudi Arabia)	JOR (Jordan)	ESP (Spain)	HUN (Hungary)	POL (Poland)	ITA (Italy)	POR (Portugal)	Points
