= 2019 FIM Bajas World Cup =

2019 FIM Bajas World Cup
Previous:	2018	Next:	2020

The 2019 FIM Bajas World Cup season was the 8th season of the FIM Bajas World Cup, an international rally raid competition for motorbikes and quads.

== Calendar ==
The calendar for the 2019 season will feature four baja-style events. Some of the bajas are also part of 2019 FIA World Cup for Cross-Country Bajas.

Round	Dates	Rally name
1	7-9 March	(United Arab Emirates) Dubai International Baja
2	23-24 March	(Portugal) Baja do Pinhal
3	26-28 July	(Spain) Baja Aragón
4	9-11 August	(Hungary) Hungarian Baja

== Teams and riders ==
Constructor	Bike	Team	Rider	Rounds
Honda	Honda CRF450R	(United Arab Emirates) Lodovico Paravicini	(United Arab Emirates) Lodovico Paravicini	1
Honda	Honda 450RX	(Spain) Ivan Donoso	(Spain) Ivan Donoso	2
Honda	Honda 700 TRX	(United Arab Emirates) Boomer Team UAE	(United Arab Emirates) Khalifa Al Raisse	1-2
Honda	Honda 700 TRX	(United Arab Emirates) Humaid AlmaShghouni	(United Arab Emirates) Humaid AlmaShghouni	1
Honda	Honda 700 TRX	(France) Roger Martin	(France) Roger Martin	1
Honda	Honda 700 TRX	(Netherlands) Dirk van den Donk	(Netherlands) Dirk van den Donk	1
Husqvarna	Husqvarna 450FC	(South Africa) Aaron Mare	(South Africa) Aaron Mare	1
Husqvarna	Husqvarna 450FC	(United Arab Emirates) Antoine Jaillet	(United Arab Emirates) Antoine Jaillet	1
Husqvarna	Husqvarna 450FC	(United Arab Emirates) Ryan Rogers	(United Arab Emirates) Ryan Rogers	1
Husqvarna	Husqvarna 450FR	(Netherlands) HT Rally Raid	(Poland) Jakub Piatek	1
Husqvarna	Husqvarna FC 450	(United Arab Emirates) SRG - Motorsports	(United Arab Emirates) Ryan Blair	1
Husqvarna	Husqvarna FX 450	(South Africa) Mark Ackerman	(South Africa) Mark Ackerman	1
Husqvarna	Husqvarna FX 450	(United Arab Emirates) SRG - Motorsports	(United Arab Emirates) Andrew Haddon	1
Husqvarna	Husqvarna FX 450	(United Arab Emirates) Stuart Murray	(United Arab Emirates) Stuart Murray	1
Kawasaki	Kawasaki KX450	(United Arab Emirates) Mohammed Al Balooshi	(United Arab Emirates) Mohammed Al Balooshi	1
Kawasaki	Kawasaki KX450	(United Arab Emirates) Sultan Balooshi	(United Arab Emirates) Sultan Balooshi	1
Kawasaki	Kawasaki KX450	(United Arab Emirates) Abdullah Taleb Al Shatti	(United Arab Emirates) Abdullah Taleb Al Shatti	1
KTM	KTM 450 SXF	(France) Benjamin Melot	(France) Benjamin Melot	1-2
KTM	KTM 450 SXF	(Kuwait) Mohammed Jaffar	(Kuwait) Mohammed Jaffar	1
KTM	KTM 450 SXF	(United Arab Emirates) Shannon O'Connor	(United Arab Emirates) Shannon O'Connor	1
KTM	KTM 450 SXF	(United Arab Emirates) Crazy Camel Racing	(United Arab Emirates) Darko Marasovic	1
KTM	KTM 450 SXF	(Kuwait) Khaled Ahmed al Bahar	(Kuwait) Khaled Ahmed al Bahar	1
KTM	KTM 450 SXF	(Kuwait) Faisal Adel al Yaqout	(Kuwait) Faisal Adel al Yaqout	1
KTM	KTM 450 EXC	(Poland) Orlen Team	(Poland) Adam Tomiczek	1
KTM	KTM 450 EXC	(Poland) Orlen Team	(Poland) Maciej Giemza	1
KTM	KTM 450 EXC	(United Arab Emirates) Mohammed Anis	(United Arab Emirates) Mohammed Anis	1
KTM	KTM 450 XCF	(United Arab Emirates) Christopher Wilding	(United Arab Emirates) Christopher Wilding	1
KTM	KTM 450 XCF	(Saudi Arabia) Mishal Alghuneim	(Saudi Arabia) Mishal Aighuneim	1
KTM	KTM 450 XCF	(Republic of Ireland) Jason Black	(Republic of Ireland) Jason Black	1
KTM	KTM 450 Rally Replica	(United Arab Emirates) Vendetta Racing	(United Arab Emirates) David McBride	1
KTM	KTM 450 Rally Replica	(United Arab Emirates) Vendetta Racing	(United Arab Emirates) David Mabbs	1
KTM	KTM 450 Rally Replica	(United Arab Emirates) Vendetta Racing	(United Arab Emirates) William McBride	1
KTM	KTM 450 Rally Replica	(Chile) Tomas Da Gavardo	(Chile) Tomas Da Gavardo	1-2
KTM	KTM 450 Rally Replica	(United Arab Emirates) SRG - Motorsports	(United Arab Emirates) Alan Wilkinson	1
KTM	KTM 450 Rally Replica	(South Africa) Kobus Roos	(South Africa) Kobus Roos	1
KTM	KTM EVC 500	(United Arab Emirates) Tomas Kristofferson	(United Arab Emirates) Tomas Kristofferon	1
KTM	KTM EVC 500	(United Arab Emirates) Sheika Nader al Nouri	(United Arab Emirates) Sheika Nader al Nouri	1
KTM	KTM EVC 500	(Germany) George El Hacham	(Germany) George El Hacham	1
KTM	KTM EVC 500	(Germany) Derek Hitchcock	(Germany) Derek Hitchcock	1
KTM	KTM EVC 500	(United Kingdom) Stan Murray	(United Kingdom) Stan Murray	1
KTM	KTM 525 XC	(United Arab Emirates) Mohammed al Shamsi	(United Arab Emirates) Mohammed al Shamsi	1
Suzuki	Suzuki LTR	(Portugal) Arnaldo Martins	(Portugal) Arnaldo Martins	2
Yamaha	Yamaha WR450F	(United Arab Emirates) Crazy Camel Racing	(Italy) Manuel Lucchese	1
Yamaha	Yamaha WR450F	(United Arab Emirates) Crazy Camel Racing	(India) Aishwarya Pissay	1-2
Yamaha	Yamaha WR450F	(United Arab Emirates) Crazy Camel Racing	(Hungary) Tamas Esche	1
Yamaha	Yamaha WR450F	(United Arab Emirates) Crazy Camel Racing	(Italy) Mattia Riva	1
Yamaha	Yamaha WR450F	(India) Ashish Raorane	(India) Ashish Raorane	1-2
Yamaha	Yamaha WR450F	(Portugal) Daniel Jordão	(Portugal) Daniel Jordão	2
Yamaha	Yamaha WR450F	(Spain) Sara Garcia	(Spain) Sara Garcia	2
Yamaha	Yamaha YZ450F	(United Arab Emirates) Abdulla bin Dakhan	(United Arab Emirates) Abdulla bin Dakhan	1
Yamaha	Yamaha YZ450FX	(United Arab Emirates) Crazy Camel Racing	(United Arab Emirates) Richard Brewer	1
Yamaha	Yamaha YZ450FX	(United Arab Emirates) Ali Laghar	(United Arab Emirates) Ali Laghar	1
Yamaha	Yamaha YZ450FX	(South Africa) Hergen Fekken	(South Africa) Hergen Fekken	1
Yamaha	Yamaha 450 YZ	(United Arab Emirates) Kalid al Falasi	(United Arab Emirates) Kalid al Falasi	1
Yamaha	Yamaha Raptor 700R	(Kuwait) Fahad al Musallam	(Kuwait) Fahad al Musallam	1
Yamaha	Yamaha Raptor 700R	(Czech Republic) Antonin Pacanda	(Czech Republic) Antonin Pacanda	2
Yamaha	Yamaha YFM 700R	(Russia) Aleksandr Maksimov	(Russia) Aleksandr Maksimov	1-2
Yamaha	Yamaha YFM 700R	(Slovakia) Juraj Varga	(Slovakia) Juraj Varga	2
Yamaha	Yamaha YFZ 450	(Saudi Arabia) Abdulmajeed Aakhulaifi	(Saudi Arabia) Abdulmajeed Aakhulaifi	1
Yamaha	Yamaha YFZ 450	(Kuwait) Momammed al Khulaifi	(Kuwait) Momammed al Khulaifi	1
Yamaha	Yamaha YFZ 450	(Italy) Stuart Isaacs	(Italy) Stuart Isaacs	1
Yamaha	Yamaha YFZ 450	(Portugal) Luís Engeitado	(Portugal) Luís Engeitado	2

== Results ==
=== Motorbikes ===
Round	Rally name	Podium finishers			
Round	Rally name	Rank	Rider	Bike	Time
1	(United Arab Emirates) Dubai International Baja	1	(South Africa) Aaron Mare	Husqvarna 450 FC	6:10:13
1	(United Arab Emirates) Dubai International Baja	2	(France) Benjamin Melot	KTM 450 XCF	6:17:55
1	(United Arab Emirates) Dubai International Baja	3	(South Africa) Mark Ackerman	Husqvarna FX 450	6:18:58
2	(Portugal) Baja do Pinhal	1	(France) Benjamin Melot	KTM 450 SXF	6:31:49
2	(Portugal) Baja do Pinhal	2	(Poland) Jakub Piatek	Husqvarna 450FR	6:44:23
2	(Portugal) Baja do Pinhal	3	(Chile) Tomas De Gavardo	KTM 450 Rally Replica	6:54:42
3	(Spain) Baja Aragón	1	(France) Michael Metge	Sherco Rally	6:30:21
3	(Spain) Baja Aragón	2	(Spain) Tosha Schareina Marzal	Husqvarna FE 450	6:34:00
3	(Spain) Baja Aragón	3	(Spain) Juan Pedrero	KTM 450	6:37:39
4	(Hungary) Hungarian Baja	1	(Poland) Adam Tomiczek	Husqvarna FE 450	6:01:48
4	(Hungary) Hungarian Baja	2	(Slovakia) Stefan Svitko	KTM 450 Rally	6:04:25
4	(Hungary) Hungarian Baja	3	(Poland) Marciej Giemza	Husqvarna FE 450	6:29:26

=== Quads ===
Round	Rally name	Podium finishers			
Round	Rally name	Rank	Rider	Quad	Time
1	(United Arab Emirates) Dubai International Baja	1	(United Arab Emirates) Khalifa Al Raisse	Honda 700 TRX	7:8:14
1	(United Arab Emirates) Dubai International Baja	2	(Saudi Arabia) Abdulmajeed Al Khulaifi	Yamaha YFZ 450	7:25:59
1	(United Arab Emirates) Dubai International Baja	3	(Russia) Aleksandr Maksimov	Yamaha YFM 700R	7:54:04
2	(Portugal) Baja do Pinhal	1	(Portugal) Luís Engeitado	Yamaha YFZ 450	6:08:35
2	(Portugal) Baja do Pinhal	2	(Slovakia) Juraj Varga	Yamaha YFM 700R	6:50:17
2	(Portugal) Baja do Pinhal	3	(Russia) Aleksandr Maksimov	Yamaha Raptor 700R	6:54:12
3	(Spain) Baja Aragón	1	(Spain) Daniel Vila Vaques	Yamaha Raptor 700R	6:56:11
3	(Spain) Baja Aragón	2	(Spain) Mario Gajon Garcia	KTM 525 XC	7:10:43
3	(Spain) Baja Aragón	3	(Spain) Toni Vingut	KTM 450HC	7:15:21
4	(Hungary) Hungarian Baja	1	(Slovakia) Juraj Varga	Yamaha YFM 700 R	8:06:25
4	(Hungary) Hungarian Baja	2	(Russia) Aleksandr Maksimov	Yamaha YFM 700 R	8:20:02
4	(Hungary) Hungarian Baja	3	(Poland) Paweł Otwinowski	Yamaha Raptor	8:22:49

== Championship standings ==
=== Riders' championship ===
- Points for final positions were awarded as follows:

Position	1st	2nd	3rd	4th	5th	6th	7th	8th	9th	10th	11th	12th	13th	14th	15th+
Points	25	20	16	13	11	10	9	8	7	6	5	4	3	2	1

==== Motorbikes ====
Pos	Rider	DUB (United Arab Emirates)	PIN (Portugal)	ARA (Spain)	HUN (Hungary)	Points
1	(France) Benjamin Melot	2^{20}	1^{25}	8^{8}	4^{13}	66
2	(Poland) Jakub Piatek	10^{6}	2^{20}	12^{4}	5^{11}	41
3	(United Arab Emirates) Sultan Al Balooshi	5^{11}	6^{7}	13^{3}	6^{10}	31
4	(Poland) Adam Tomiczek			11^{5}	1^{25}	30
5	(Chile) Tomas De Gavardo	13^{3}	3^{16}	23^{1}	8^{8}	28
6	(Poland) Maciej Giemza			6^{10}	3^{16}	26
7	(France) Michael Metge			1^{25}		25
8	(South Africa) Aaron Mare	1^{25}				25
9	(United Arab Emirates) Abdullah T. Alshatti	7^{9}	10^{6}	14^{2}	12^{4}	21
10	(Slovakia) Štefan Svitko				2^{20}	20
11	(Spain) Tosha Schareina Marzal			2^{20}		20
12	(India) Ashish Raorane	18^{1}	8^{8}	29^{1}	7^{9}	19
13	(Spain) Juan Pedrero			3^{16}		16
14	(South Africa) Mark Ackermann	3^{16}				16
15	(Portugal) Rita Vieira		6^{10}	25^{1}	11^{5}	16
16	(Spain) Sara Garcia Alvarez		7^{9}	27^{1}	10^{6}	16
17	(Spain) Lorenzo Santolino			4^{13}		13
18	(Spain) Ivan Donoso Silva		4^{13}			13
19	(Kuwait) Mohammad Jaafar Meshari	4^{13}				13
20	(United Arab Emirates) Mohammed Al Balooshi	24^{1}	5^{11}			12
21	(Czech Republic) Martin Michek			5^{11}		11
22	(United Kingdom) Ryan Blair	6^{10}				10
23	(India) Aishwarya Madhusudhan Pissay	21^{1}	11^{5}	33^{1}	13^{3}	10
24	(India) Narith Noah Koitha Veettil			7^{9}		9
25	(South Africa) Shannon O'Connor	8^{8}				8
26	(Spain) Rosa Romero			24^{1}	9^{7}	8
27	(Andorra) Christian España Muñoz			9^{7}		7
28	(United Kingdom) Ryan Rogers	9^{7}				7
29	(India) Santosh Chunchungguppe S			10^{6}		7
30	(France) Antoine Jaillet	11^{5}				5
31	(Republic of Ireland) William Mcbride	12^{4}				4
32	(United Kingdom) Thomas Childs	14^{2}				2
33	(United Kingdom) David Mabbs	15^{1}				1
34	(Saudi Arabia) Mishal Al Ghuneim	16^{1}				1
35	(Egypt) Mohamed Anis	17^{1}				1
36	(France) Bruno Bony			26^{1}		1
37	(United Arab Emirates) Khalid Al Falasi	19^{1}				1
38	(Andorra) Margot Llobera			28^{1}		1
39	(United Kingdom) David McBride	20^{1}				1
40	(France) Fabrice Lardon			30^{1}		1
41	(South Africa) Alan Wilkinson	22^{1}				1
42	(France) Enzo Cilote			32^{1}		1
43	(United Kingdom) Andrew Haddon	23^{1}				1
44	(Portugal) Joaquim Rodrigues				34^{1}	1
Pos	Rider	DUB (United Arab Emirates)	PIN (Portugal)	ARA (Spain)	HUN (Hungary)	Points

==== Quads ====
Pos	Rider	DUB (United Arab Emirates)	PIN (Portugal)	ARA (Spain)	HUN (Hungary)	Points
1	(Russia) Aleksandr Maksimov	3^{16}	3^{16}	5^{11}	2^{20}	63
2	(Slovakia) Juraj Varga		2^{20}	9^{7}	1^{25}	51
3	(Spain) Daniel Vila Vaquez			1^{25}		25
4	(Portugal) Luis Engeitado		1^{25}			25
5	(United Arab Emirates) Khalifa Al Raeesi	1^{25}				25
6	(Spain) Mario Gajon Garcia			2^{20}		20
7	(Saudi Arabia) Abdulmajeed Al Khulaifi	2^{20}				20
8	(Poland) Paweł Otwinowski				3^{16}	16
9	(Spain) Toni Vingut			3^{16}		16
10	(France) Jérôme Connart			4^{13}		13
11	(Czech Republic) Antonin Pacanda		4^{13}			13
12	(Kuwait) Mohammad J. Alkhulaifi	4^{13}				13
13	(France) Romain Dutu			6^{10}		10
14	(France) Alexandre Giroud			7^{9}		9
15	(Spain) Miguel Angel Arranz Lopez			8^{8}		8
16	(Russia) Sergei Redkov			10^{6}		6
17	(Kazakhstan) Artur Ardavichus			11^{5}		5
Pos	Rider	DUB (United Arab Emirates)	PIN (Portugal)	ARA (Spain)	HUN (Hungary)	Points
