= Sharqiyah Baja =

Former baja rally event in Saudi Arabia

The Sharqiyah Baja was an international baja rally held near Khobar, in the region of Sharqiyah, in Saudi Arabia.

== History ==
The event was organized for the first time in 2019, promoted as a FIA candidate rally. After its cancellation in 2020 due to the COVID-19 pandemic, in 2021, the rally become part of the FIA World Cup for Cross-Country Bajas.

The rally has been part also of the Saudi Arabia Championship for cross-country rallies.

== Winners ==
=== Auto ===
Year	FIA World Cup for Cross-Country Bajas		National	
Year	Driver & Codriver	Car	Driver & Codriver	Car
2019	N/A		(Saudi Arabia) Yazeed Al Rajhi (United Kingdom) Michael Orr	Toyota Hilux
2020	Cancelled due to COVID-19 pandemic			
2021	(Saudi Arabia) Yasir Seaidan (Russia) Alexey Kuzmich	Mini John Cooper Works Rally	(Saudi Arabia) Saleh Abdullah Al Abdulali (Saudi Arabia) Mohammed Nasser Al Niem	Hummer H3

=== Moto and Quad ===
Year	Moto		Quad	
Year	Rider	Vehicle	Rider	Vehicle
2019	(Saudi Arabia) Mishal Alghuneim	KTM	(Saudi Arabia) Abdulmajeed Al Khulaifi	Yamaha
2020	Cancelled due to COVID-19 pandemic			
2021	(New Zealand) Phillip Wilson	KTM 450 Rally	(Saudi Arabia) Alnoumesi Hani	Yamaha Raptor 700R
