= Margot Llobera =

Andorran footballer

Personal information
- Full name: Margot Llobera Farré
- Date of birth: 18 May 1996 (age 30)
- Position: Defender

International career^{‡}
Years	Team	Apps	(Gls)
2015	Andorra	3	(0)
- ‡ National team caps and goals as of 9 April 2015

Margot Llobera Farré (born 18 May 1996) is an Andorran rally raid motorcycle rider and retired footballer who played as a defender. She was a member of the Andorra women's national team. She also participated as a motorbiker in the 2019 FIM Bajas World Cup at the Baja Aragón and as a side-by-side co-driver at the 2022 Dakar Rally.

She is the niece of paraplegic rally driver and former alpine skier Albert Llovera. Her sister Alexia also participated in the Dakar Rally.

== See also ==
- List of Andorra women's international footballers
