= Rui Ferreira =

Portuguese football manager (born 1973)

Personal information
- Full name: Rui Vítor da Silva Ferreira
- Date of birth: 29 March 1973 (age 53)
- Place of birth: Espinho, Portugal
- Height: 1.76 m (5 ft 9 in)
- Position: Defensive midfielder

Team information
- Current team: Feirense (head coach)

Youth career
- –1988: Espinho
- 1988–1991: Benfica

Senior career*
Years	Team	Apps	(Gls)
1991–1992	União Mirense		
1992–1993	Oliveirense		
1993–1994	Espinho		
1994–1995	Lusitânia		
1995–1997	União de Lamas		
1997–1999	Gil Vicente		
1999–2002	Salgueiros	78	(0)
2002–2004	Vitória de Guimarães	54	(0)
2005–2006	Belenenses	38	(0)
2006–2007	Portimonense	37	(0)
2008–2009	Espinho		
2009	Santa Clara	9	(0)

International career
1988	Portugal U16	10	(0)

Managerial career
- 2010–2011: Boavista
- 2012: Nogueirense
- 2012: Espinho
- 2020: Feirense (U23)
- 2020–2021: Felgueiras
- 2021–2023: Feirense
- 2023: Torreense
- 2024–2025: Académico de Viseu
- 2025: AVS
- 2025–2026: Ethnikos Achnas
- 2026: Felgueiras
- 2026–: Feirense
- * Club domestic league appearances and goals

Rui Vítor da Silva Ferreira (born 29 March 1973) is a Portuguese football manager and former player who is the head coach of Liga Portugal 2 club Feirense.

A midfielder, he played 188 Primeira Liga games for Salgueiros, Vitória de Guimarães and Belenenses over seven consecutive seasons starting in 1999. He represented several clubs in the second tier, winning the title with Gil Vicente in 1998–99.

Ferreira began his managerial career with Boavista in 2010. He led Feirense, Torreense and Académico de Viseu and Felgueiras in the second division, and AVS briefly in the top flight.

== Playing career ==
Born in Espinho in the Aveiro District, Ferreira played as a youth for local S.C. Espinho before moving to S.L. Benfica, but began his senior career in the lower leagues. In 1998–99, he contributed six goals to Gil Vicente F.C.'s conquest of the second tier, leading to a transfer to S.C. Salgueiros in the Primeira Liga. He made his debut in the top flight on 22 August, in a 1–0 home win over C.S. Marítimo.

In June 2002, after Salgueiros were relegated, Ferreira signed a one-year deal at Vitória de Guimarães, becoming their sixth free transfer of the summer due to the president's order. Having already been courted by the club in April 2002, Ferreira signed for C.F. Os Belenenses on an 18-month deal in January 2005.

Ferreira joined Portimonense S.C. in the second tier in August 2006. He said that he still had the quality to play in the top flight, but was unable to receive a contract due to being 33. He began 2008–09 at his hometown club Espinho, and signed for C.D. Santa Clara in January.

== Managerial career ==
In August 2010, Ferreira was appointed at Boavista F.C. in the third tier. His debut on 22 September was a 2–2 home draw with Cesarense. After leaving in January 2011, he later managed A.D. Nogueirense and Espinho.

Ferreira was hired for the under-23 team of C.D. Feirense in January 2020. He started the following season in charge of FC Felgueiras 1932 but returned to Feirense on 29 March 2021 as first-team manager due to a contractual clause allowing him to leave at zero cost for a club in the professional leagues; he replaced Filó at the club from Santa Maria da Feira, who were second in the league.

On 4 April 2021, Ferreira debuted as manager in the second tier, in a 1–1 home draw with C.D. Cova da Piedade in which his team conceded in the final seconds. His team missed out on promotion by falling to 5th by the end of his eight games of the season. In 2021–22, he led the team to fourth place, one off the playoffs; halfway through it, he extended his contract to 2024.

Having helped Feirense to 8th place in the league by beating S.C.U. Torreense on the final day, Ferreira contacted the board and was released from the final year of his contract on 26 May 2023. A week later, he was hired by Torreense. He left on 11 December, with the club from Torres Vedras 6th in the league having won and drawn five each of 13 fixtures; they also reached the fourth round of the Taça de Portugal by defeating top-flight Rio Ave F.C. and made the second round of the Taça da Liga.

On 23 May 2024, Ferreira signed a one-year deal at Académico de Viseu F.C. also in the second tier. He was the league's Manager of the Month for August, his first month in the job, winning three and drawing one game, while scoring 10 goals and conceding 3.

Ferreira signed with AVS, in the relegation battle in the Primeira Liga, on 16 February 2025 for his first time coaching in the top flight. He left by mutual consent on 9 May after winning once in 11 games, with José Mota succeeding him for the final two games of the season.

On 28 December 2025, Ferreira moved abroad for the first time in his career, taking charge of Cypriot First Division club Ethnikos Achnas. He left the following March and returned to Felgueiras, with the aim of keeping them in the second division.

Ferreira returned to Feirense in the same division on 15 September 2026.
