= CS Santosh =

Indian competitive motorcyclist

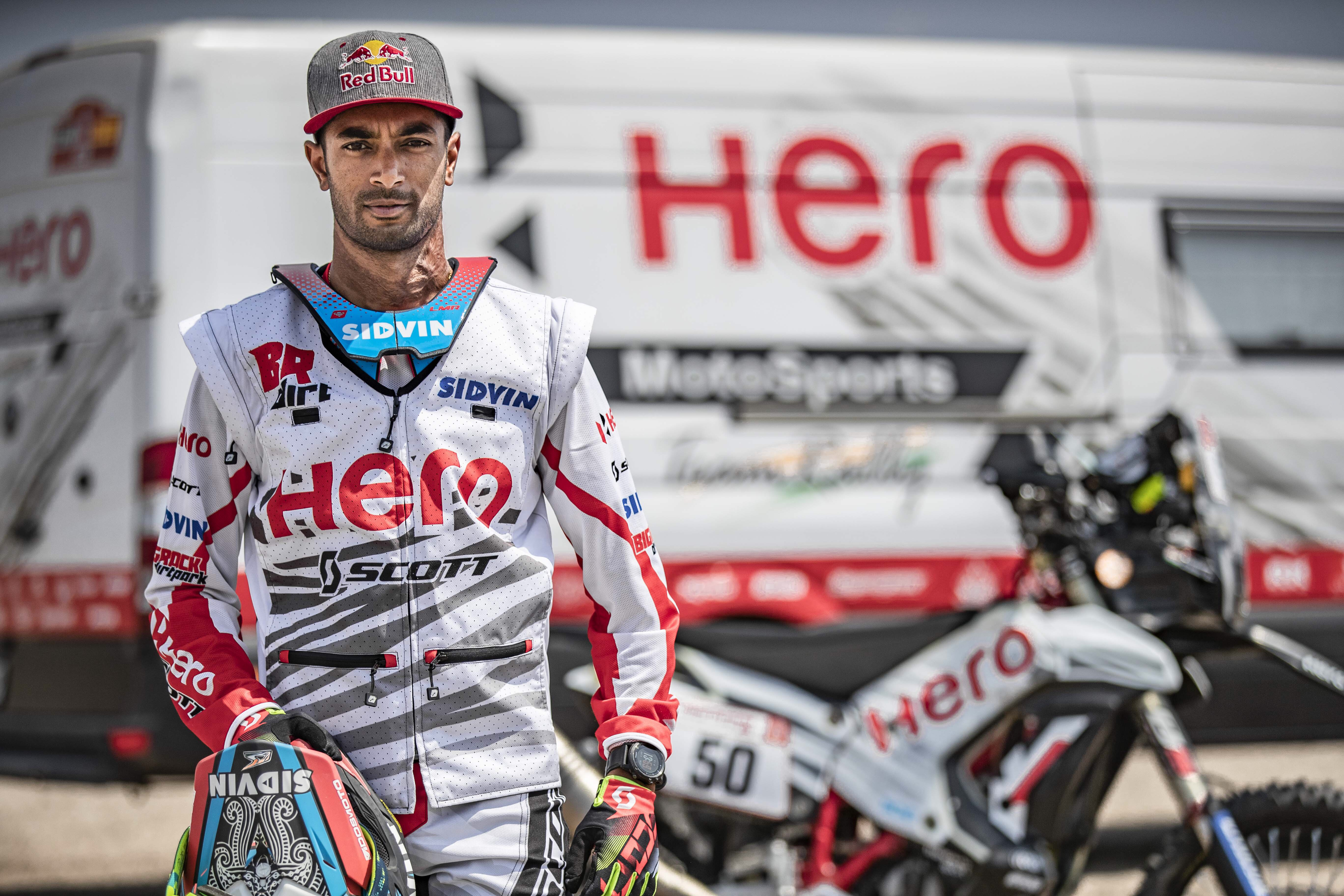
- CS Santosh with Hero MotoCorp at the 2019 Dakar Rally

Personal information
- Full name: Chunchunguppe Shivashankar Santosh
- Born: 1 December 1983 (age 42) Bangalore, Karnataka, India
- Height: 1.82 m (6 ft 0 in)
- Weight: 75 kg (165 lb)
- Website: cssantosh.com

Sport
- Country: India
- Sport: Motorsport
- Event: Supercross / Motocross / Rallying

Achievements and titles
- World finals: 2009 - Maharagama Motocross; 2010 - Nur Elia Motocross; 2010 - Fox Hill Supercross; 2010 - Vijayabahu Motocross; 2010 - Gunner's Supercross; 2010 - Gajaba Supercross; 2010 - Nalanda Motocross; 2010 - Asian Motocross Championship; 2011 - Gunner's Supercross; 2011 - Gajaba Supercross; 2011 - Sigiri Rally Supercross; 2011 - Fox Hill Supercross; 2012 - Gunner's Supercross; 2012 - Gajaba Supercross; 2012 - The Cavalry Supercross; 2014 - World Cross Country Rally Championship; 2015 - Dakar Rally; 2015 - Baja Aragon; 2017 - Dakar Rally; 2017 - Nexa P1 Powerboat Indian Grand Prix; 2018 - Dakar Rally
- National finals: MRF National Supercross Championship; Gulf National Dirt track Championship; 2012 - Maruti Suzuki Raid-De-Himalaya; 2014 - Maruti Suzuki Desert Storm; 2015 - Maruti Suzuki Desert Storm; 2016 - Maruti Suzuki Desert Storm; 2016 - India Baja

Chunchunguppe Shivashankar Santosh (born 1 December 1983), known as CS Santosh (siːɛs sʌnðəʊsh), is an Indian off-road and enduro motorcycle racer. He is a multiple National Supercross and Motocross champion. He operates under the banner of Hero MotoSports.

== Early life ==
At the age of 17, Santosh watched his first Supercross race in Bangalore and read about the champion, Vijay Kumar, in newspapers the next day.

== Career ==
=== 2005 ===
CS Santosh won the MRF National Supercross champion and the Gulf National Dirt Track championship in 2005 at the age of 22.

=== 2006 ===
In 2006, he won the Al-Ain Motocross in Dubai & finished 5th overall in Dubai National MX championship.

=== 2007 ===
He became the National Supercross champion after a successful year.

=== 2008 ===
In 2008, he became the first Indian in the Asian Motocross championship, to have qualified with the fastest time in Moto II in Iran, where he finished fourth, the highest ever by an Indian rider on the international circuit. He also became the MRF Supercross Challenge champion and won the Gulf Dirt Track championship for the second time.

=== 2009 ===
Santosh won the 2009 Maharagama Motocross in Sri Lanka.

=== 2010 ===
In 2010, Santosh won MRF National Supercross championship and the Rolon National Dirt Track championship as well as finishing 6th overall in the Asian MX championship. He also secured a Foxhill Supercross win in Sri Lanka later that year.

=== 2011 ===
Santosh won the Gajaba Supercross as well as the Gunner's Supercross. Both held in Sri Lanka. He also won the Sigiri Rally Supercross and finished 2nd in the Fox Hill Supercross of 2011.

=== 2012 ===
In 2012, he participated in the Raid-de-Himalaya, which is the only Indian motorsport event listed on the off-road rallies calendar of FIM (Federation Internationale Motorcyclisme), Geneva, Switzerland. He won the race in his maiden attempt in record time. He also finished 2nd in the Cavalry Supercross.

=== 2013 ===
Santosh became the first Indian to debut at the World Cross Country Rally Championship in 2013 but a fire accident injured him badly during the 3rd stage. He was running in the top 10 in his class. With third degree burns, he had a long recovery period that lasted till the end of the year.

=== 2014 ===
Santosh won the Maruti Suzuki Desert Storm in India in his maiden attempt in 2014. He also finished 9th in the 2014 World Cross Country Championship.

=== 2015 ===
Santosh became the first Indian to compete in the Dakar Rally. He finished the Dakar at 36th position. He also won the 2015 Maruti Suzuki Desert Storm and finished 13th in the Baja Aragon.

=== 2016 ===
Santosh returned to the Dakar in 2016 with Team Suzuki Rally, Spain. He had to retire from the race due to mechanical difficulties. He won the 2016 India Baja later that year and headed for the Desert Storm which he won for the third time in a row.

=== 2017 ===
Santosh started off the year as the only Indian rider to finish the 2017 Dakar, while racing for Hero Speedbrain. He completed the race clocking a time of 41:20:37 at 47th position.

Santosh raced at the inaugural Nexa P1 Powerboat Indian Grand Prix of the Seas and took his maiden powerboat win. He was the first Indian P1 pilot to win the Nexa P1 Powerboat Indian Gran Prix of the Seas.

=== 2018 ===
Santosh finished the 2018 Dakar Rally to become the first Indian to complete the rally raid thrice. His 34th position in the bike category was his best-ever finish at the Dakar.

=== 2021 ===
Riding for the Hero Motocorp team in the Dakar 2021 rally, CS Santosh crashed out 135 km into the Stage 4 on a gravel track, forcing his retirement. Suffering a suspected head injury, he was flown out to a hospital in Riyadh. On what was his seventh attempt at the Dakar Rally, Santosh suffered a heavy crash on a gravel track in Stage 4. Husqvarna’s Paul Spierings was the first to arrive at the scene and revealed that he found Santosh unconscious and had to resuscitate him. After being attended to by the on-ground medical team, he was flown down to the German Hospital in Riyadh.

== Awards and recognition ==
- Motorsport Man of the Year - 2015
- FMSCI's Motorsport Man of the Year award - 2016
