= 2022 FIA World Cup for Cross-Country Bajas =

2022 FIA World Cup for Cross-Country Bajas
Previous:	2021	Next:	2023

The 2022 FIA World Cup for Cross-Country Bajas is the fourth season of the FIA World Cup for Cross-Country Bajas; an annual competition for baja-style rally raid events for cars, buggies, and side-by-sides held in multiple countries.

== Calendar ==
The initial calendar for the 2022 world cup features eight cross-country baja events. Some events on the schedule are shared with the 2022 FIM Bajas World Cup.

Round	Dates	Rally name
1	11-13 February	Baja Russia - Northern Forest
2	17-19 February	Jordan Baja
3	8-10 July	(Italy) 29º Italian Baja
4	22-24 July	(Spain) Baja España Aragón
5	2-4 September	Baja Poland
6	28-30 October	(Portugal) Baja Portalegre 500
7	10-12 November	(Saudi Arabia) Saudi Baja
8	1-3 December	(United Arab Emirates) Dubai International Baja

== Regulation ==
The following groups and classes are allowed:

- Group T1 - Prototype Cross-Country Vehicles
  - T1.1 - T1 4x4 - Petrol and Diesel
  - T1.2 - T1 4x2 - Petrol and Diesel
- Group T2 - Series Production Cross-Country Vehicles - Petrol and Diesel
- Group T3 - Lightweight Prototypes Cross-Country Vehicles
- Group T4 - Lightweight Series Production Cross-Country Side-by-Side Vehicles

The FIA awards the world cup to drivers, co-drivers, teams, T3 and T4 drivers and T4 teams.

== Teams and drivers ==
T1 & T2 Teams & Drivers
Constructor	Car	Team	Driver	Co-driver	Rounds
Bowler	Bowler Wildcat	Metal Lube Rally Raid Team	(Spain) Domingo Román	(Spain) Susana Hernando	4
Fast & Speed	2WD		(Egypt) Ahmed El Shamy	(Egypt) Obaid Hassan	8
Ford	Ford F150 EVO	Offroad Sport CZ	(Czech Republic) Miroslav Zapletal	(Slovakia) Marek Sykora	2, 7–8
Ford	Ford F150 EVO	Ming Racing Sports	(Czech Republic) František Brutovský	(Czech Republic) Petr Hauptmann	3, 5
Ford	Ford Ranger	PRK Sport Rallye Team	(Spain) Daniel Alonso	(Spain) Alejandro Lopez	4
Ford	Ford Ranger	PRK Sport Rallye Team	(Portugal) Edgar Condenso	(Portugal) Soraia Chambel	4
Ford	Ford Ranger	PRK Sport Rallye Team	(Portugal) Edgar Condenso	(Portugal) António Serrão	6
Ford	Ford Ranger		(Spain) Santiago Carnicer	(Spain) Miguel Lázaro	4
Ford	Ford Ranger		(Portugal) Francisco Barreto	(Portugal) Carlos Silva	6
Ford	Ford Ranger		(Portugal) Nuno Madeira	(Portugal) José Janela	6
GAZ	GAZelle NEXT	GAZ Raid Sport	(Russia) Alexander Rusanov	(Russia) Evgeny Pavlov	1
GAZ	GAZelle NEXT	GAZ Raid Sport	(Russia) Evgenii Sukhovenko	(Russia) Kirill Chapaev	1
Hummer	Hummer H3 EVO	Offroad Sport CZ	(Czech Republic) Miroslav Zapletal	(Slovakia) Marek Sykora	3–5
Jeep	Jeep Wrangler		(Oman) Abdullah Al Zubair	(Saudi Arabia) Omar Al Lahim	8
Mini	Mini Cooper Countryman	VRT Team	(Russia) Vladimir Vasilyev	(Latvia) Oleg Uperenko	1
Mini	Mini John Cooper Works Rally	X-Raid Mini JCW Team	(Argentina) Sebastian Halpern	(Argentina) Bernardo Graue	4
Mini	Mini John Cooper Works Rally	X-Raid Mini JCW Team	(Poland) Krzysztof Hołowczyc	(Poland) Lukasz Kurzeja	4
Mini	Mini John Cooper Works Rally		(Portugal) João Ferreira	(Portugal) David Monteiro	4, 6
Mini	Mini John Cooper Works Rally		(Portugal) Alejandro Martins	(Portugal) José Marques	4, 6
Mini	Mini John Cooper Works Rally	CDE GPR Sport	(Spain) Luis Recuenco	(Spain) Sergio Peinado	4
Mini	Mini All4 Racing	CDE GPR Sport	(Spain) Luis Recuenco	(Portugal) Jorge Monteiro	6
Mini	Mini All4 Racing		(Portugal) Maria Gameiro	(Spain) Manuel Navarro	4, 6
Mini	Mini Paceman Proto	Posumavsky Auto Moto Klub v ACR	(Czech Republic) Petr Hozak	(Czech Republic) Rene Kilian	4
Mini	Mini Paceman Proto	Posumavsky Auto Moto Klub v ACR	(Czech Republic) Petr Hozak	(Slovakia) Marek Sykora	6
Mitsubishi	Mitsubishi Montero	Escuderia Motor Terrassa	(Spain) David Nogareda	(Spain) Joan Rubi	4
Nissan	Nissan Pathfinder Proto	Ramingo 4x4	(Italy) Andrea Alfano	(Italy) Carmen Marsiglia	3
Porsche	LPR Porsche Macan	LP Racing KFT	(Hungary) Pal Lonyai	(Hungary) Nikolett Szoke	4, 6
Sodicars	BV2	CD Cuenca Motor 4x4	(Spain) Manuel Plaza	(Spain) Marta Plaza	4
Suzuki	Suzuki Gran Vitara		(Italy) Emilio Ferroni	(Italy) Daniele Fiorini	3
Toyota	Toyota Hilux Overdrive	Overdrive Racing	(Saudi Arabia) Yazeed Al-Rajhi	(United Kingdom) Michael Orr	1–5
Toyota	Toyota Hilux Overdrive	Overdrive Racing	(Saudi Arabia) Yazeed Al-Rajhi	(Germany) Dirk von Zitzewitz	6–8
Toyota	Toyota Hilux Overdrive	Overdrive Racing	(Argentina) Juan Cruz Yacopini	(Argentina) Matias Acosta	3
Toyota	Toyota Hilux Overdrive	Overdrive Racing	(Argentina) Juan Cruz Yacopini	(Argentina) Fernando Acosta	4
Toyota	Toyota Hilux Overdrive	Overdrive Racing	(Netherlands) Erik Van Loon	(France) Sebastien Delaunay	4, 8
Toyota	Toyota Hilux Overdrive	Overdrive Racing	(Brazil) Lucas Moraes	(Brazil) Kaique Bentivoglio	4
Toyota	Toyota Hilux Overdrive	Overdrive Racing	(Brazil) Lucas Moraes	(Germany) Timo Gottschalk	8
Toyota	Toyota Hilux Overdrive	Overdrive Racing	(Portugal) Lourenço Rosa	(Portugal) Joaquim Dias	6
Toyota	Toyota Hilux Overdrive	Overdrive Racing	(Portugal) Miguel Barbosa	(Portugal) Hugo Magalhães	6
Toyota	Toyota GR DKR Hilux	Toyota Gazoo Racing	(Qatar) Nasser Al-Attiyah	(Andorra) Mathieu Baumel	4
Toyota	Toyota Hilux	Uspenskiy Rally Tecnica	(Russia) Sergey Uspenskiy	(Russia) Marina Danilova	1
Toyota	Toyota Hilux		(Hungary) 'Csucsu'	(Hungary) Márk Mesterházi	3
Toyota	Toyota Hilux		(Portugal) João Ramos	(Portugal) Filipe Palmeiro	4
Toyota	Toyota Hilux	Esc. Team Repauto	(Spain) Felix Macias	(Spain) José Luis Conde	4
Toyota	Toyota Hilux		(Poland) Włodzimierz Grajek	(Poland) Łukasz Łaskawiec	5
Toyota	Toyota Hilux	Finarto Racing	(Poland) Tomasz Baranowski	(Poland) Maciej Marton	5–6
Toyota	Toyota Hilux		(Portugal) Tiago Reis	(Portugal) Valter Cardoso	6
Toyota	Toyota LC 200	Overlimit	(Poland) Grzegorz Brochocki	(Poland) Grzegorz Komar	3
T3 Teams & Drivers
Constructor	Car	Team	Driver	Co-driver	Rounds
Arcane	T3		(Netherlands) Vick Versteijnen	(Netherlands) Teun van Dal	4
Can-Am	BRP Can-Am Maverick X3	South Racing Can-Am	(Argentina) Fernando Álvarez	(Argentina) José Luis Diaz	1
Can-Am	BRP Can-Am Maverick X3	South Racing Can-Am	(Argentina) Fernando Álvarez	(France) Xavier Panseri	2–8
Can-Am	BRP Can-Am Maverick X3	South Racing Can-Am	(Saudi Arabia) Dania Akeel	(France) Laurent Lichtleuchter	1–3, 5–6
Can-Am	BRP Can-Am Maverick X3	South Racing Can-Am	(Saudi Arabia) Dania Akeel	(France) Stephane Duple	4
Can-Am	BRP Can-Am Maverick X3	South Racing Can-Am	(Saudi Arabia) Dania Akeel	(Uruguay) Sergio Lafuente	7–8
Can-Am	BRP Can-Am Maverick X3	South Racing Can-Am	(Netherlands) Erik van Loon	(France) Sebastien Delaunay	3
Can-Am	BRP Can-Am Maverick X3	South Racing Can-Am	(Netherlands) Anja van Loon	(Netherlands) Lisette Bakker	3–4
Can-Am	BRP Can-Am Maverick X3	South Racing Can-Am	(Netherlands) Anja van Loon	(Ukraine) Dmytro Tsyro	8
Can-Am	BRP Can-Am Maverick X3	South Racing Can-Am	(Saudi Arabia) Mashael Alobaidan	(Spain) Armand Monleon	3–4
Can-Am	BRP Can-Am Maverick X3	South Racing Can-Am	(Saudi Arabia) Mashael Alobaidan	(Peru) Héctor García	5
Can-Am	BRP Can-Am Maverick X3	South Racing Can-Am	(Saudi Arabia) Mashael Alobaidan	(France) François Cazalet	6
Can-Am	BRP Can-Am Maverick X3	South Racing Can-Am	(Saudi Arabia) Mashael Alobaidan	(Netherlands) Wouter Rosegaar	7
Can-Am	BRP Can-Am Maverick X3	South Racing Can-Am	(Saudi Arabia) Mashael Alobaidan	(Italy) Paolo Ceci	8
Can-Am	BRP Can-Am Maverick X3	South Racing Can-Am	(Colombia) Antonio Marmolejo	(Spain) Xavier Montasell	6
Can-Am	BRP Can-Am Maverick X3	South Racing Can-Am	(Qatar) Mohammed Al Atteya	(United Arab Emirates) Ali Mirza	7
Can-Am	BRP Can-Am Maverick X3	South Racing Can-Am	(Portugal) Filipe Nascimento	(Portugal) João Serodio	2
Can-Am	BRP Can-Am Maverick X3	PRK Sport Rally Team	(Portugal) Filipe Nascimento	(Portugal) João Serodio	1, 4, 6
Can-Am	BRP Can-Am Maverick X3	Snag Racing Team	(Saudi Arabia) Saleh Alsaif	(Russia) Egor Okhotnikov	1
Can-Am	BRP Can-Am Maverick X3	Black Horse	(Saudi Arabia) Saleh Alsaif	(Russia) Egor Okhotnikov	2
Can-Am	BRP Can-Am Maverick X3	Black Horse	(Saudi Arabia) Saleh Alsaif	(Saudi Arabia) Tariq Al-Rammah	7
Can-Am	BRP Can-Am Maverick X3	VF Team	(Russia) Vadim Fedotov	(Russia) Aleksandr Kupriyanov	1
Can-Am	BRP Can-Am Maverick X3	Podmoskowye	(Russia) Anastasiya Nifontova	(Russia) Ekaterina Zhadanova	1
Can-Am	BRP Can-Am Maverick X3	Nakusi Racing Team	(Russia) Armen Puzian	(Russia) Evgenii Zagorodniuk	1–2
Can-Am	BRP Can-Am Maverick X3	Nakusi Racing Team	(Russia) Pavel Silnov	(Russia) Kirill Shubin	1–2
Can-Am	BRP Can-Am Maverick X3	Automovil Club Alcalans	(Spain) Enrique Reyes	(Spain) Jorge Saiz	1
Can-Am	BRP Can-Am Maverick X3		(Spain) Ricardo Ramilo	(Spain) Francisco Javier López	1, 3
Can-Am	BRP Can-Am Maverick X3		(Spain) Ricardo Ramilo	(Argentina) Bruno Jacomy	4
Can-Am	BRP Can-Am Maverick X3		(Spain) Ricardo Ramilo	(Portugal) Soraia Chambel	5
Can-Am	BRP Can-Am Maverick X3	Biedriba Sports Racing Technologies	(Saudi Arabia) Mashael Alobaidan	(Russia) Alexey Kuzmich	1
Can-Am	BRP Can-Am Maverick X3	FN Speed Team	(Spain) Pau Navarro	(Spain) Pedro Lopez	3
Can-Am	BRP Can-Am Maverick X3	FN Speed Team	(Spain) Pau Navarro	(Spain) Victor González	4
Can-Am	BRP Can-Am Maverick X3	FN Speed Team	(Spain) Pau Navarro	(France) Michael Metge	5–6
Can-Am	BRP Can-Am Maverick X3	FN Speed Team	(Spain) Santiago Navarro	(France) Michael Metge	4
Can-Am	BRP Can-Am Maverick X3	FN Speed Team	(Spain) Cristina Giampaoli	(Argentina) Ricardo Torlaschi	4
Can-Am	BRP Can-Am Maverick X3		(Portugal) João Dias	(Portugal) João Miranda	4, 6
Can-Am	BRP Can-Am Maverick X3	Nasser Racing	(Spain) Dani Sordo	(Spain) Candido Carrera	4
Can-Am	BRP Can-Am Maverick X3		(Portugal) Pedro Carvalho	(Portugal) Nuno Morais	4
Can-Am	BRP Can-Am Maverick X3		(Portugal) Pedro Carvalho	(Portugal) André Guerreiro	6
Can-Am	BRP Can-Am Maverick X3		(France) Benoit Soulas	(France) Thomas Lacoste	4
Can-Am	BRP Can-Am Maverick X3	Classic Cars Andorra	(Andorra) Jordi Pons	(Spain) Jessica Nebra	4
Can-Am	BRP Can-Am Maverick X3		(Spain) Roberto Rodriguez	(Spain) Herman Rodriguez	4, 6
Can-Am	BRP Can-Am Maverick X3		(Portugal) Nelson Beiro	(Portugal) Manuel Porem	4
Can-Am	BRP Can-Am Maverick X3		(Portugal) Nelson Beiro	(Portugal) Rui Gomes	6
Can-Am	BRP Can-Am Maverick X3		(Portugal) Aloisio Monteiro	(Portugal) Eduardo Oiteiro	6
Can-Am	BRP Can-Am Maverick X3		(Portugal) Jorge Cardoso	(Portugal) André Barras	6
Can-Am	BRP Can-Am Maverick X3		(Portugal) Pedro Ruivo	(Portugal) Filipe Rasteiro	6
Can-Am	BRP Can-Am Maverick X3	Thomas Bell Racing	(South Africa) Geoffrey Minnitt	(Portugal) Pedro Santos	8
Can-Am	BRP Can-Am Maverick X3		(United Arab Emirates) Khalid Aljafla	(Russia) Andrei Rudnitski	8
DPR by PRK Sport	PRK Sport 002	PRK Sport Rally Tem	(Portugal) Filipe Carvalho	(Portugal) Maria Carvalho	4
DPR by PRK Sport	PRK Sport 002	PRK Sport Rally Tem	(Portugal) Filipe Carvalho	(Portugal) Paulo Torres	6
OT3	OT3	G Rally Team	(Belgium) Guillaume De Mevius	(France) François Cazalet	4
OT3	OT3		(Portugal) Luís Portela de Morais	(Portugal) Tomas Dantas Neves	6
PH-Sport	Zephyr		(France) Lionel Costes	(France) Paul Costes	4
PH-Sport	Zephyr		(France) Mathieu Serradori	(France) Loïc Minaudier	4
VM Competicion	Ordaz-R	Automovil Club Alcalans	(Spain) Enrique Reyes	(Spain) Fina Román	4
T4 Teams & Drivers
Constructor	Car	Team	Driver	Co-driver	Rounds
Can-Am	BRP Can-Am Maverick XRS Turbo	Automovil Club Alcalans	(Spain) Miguel Angel Valero	(Spain) Jaqueline Ricci	1, 4
Can-Am	BRP Can-Am Maverick XRS Turbo	Automovil Club Alcalans	(Spain) Miguel Angel Valero	(Spain) Vanesa Viso	6
Can-Am	BRP Can-Am Maverick XRS Turbo	Team Race World	(Saudi Arabia) Yousef Al-Dhaif	(Saudi Arabia) Omar Al-Lahim	1–2
Can-Am	BRP Can-Am Maverick XRS Turbo	Snag Racing Team	(Russia) Sergei Remennik	(Russia) Yaroslav Fedorov	1
Can-Am	BRP Can-Am Maverick XRS Turbo	Snag Racing Team	(Brazil) Cristiano Batista	(Brazil) Wladimir Reis	1
Can-Am	BRP Can-Am Maverick XRS Turbo	South Racing Can-Am	(Brazil) Cristiano Batista	(Brazil) Wladimir Reis	2–4
Can-Am	BRP Can-Am Maverick XRS Turbo	South Racing Can-Am	(Brazil) Cristiano Batista	(Portugal) Fausto Mota	6–8
Can-Am	BRP Can-Am Maverick XRS Turbo	South Racing Can-Am	(Kuwait) Mshari Al-Thefiri	(France) François Cazalet	2
Can-Am	BRP Can-Am Maverick XRS Turbo	South Racing Can-Am	(Kuwait) Mshari Al-Thefiri	(Qatar) Nasser Al Kuwari	3–4
Can-Am	BRP Can-Am Maverick XRS Turbo	South Racing Can-Am	(Kuwait) Mshari Al-Thefiri	(Spain) Oriol Vidal	5–8
Can-Am	BRP Can-Am Maverick XRS Turbo	South Racing Can-Am	(Netherlands) Kees Koolen	(Netherlands) Mirjam Pol	2
Can-Am	BRP Can-Am Maverick XRS Turbo	South Racing Can-Am	(Netherlands) Kees Koolen	(Italy) Paolo Ceci	3–7
Can-Am	BRP Can-Am Maverick XRS Turbo	South Racing Can-Am	(Netherlands) Kees Koolen	(Netherlands) Wouter Rosegaar	8
Can-Am	BRP Can-Am Maverick XRS Turbo	South Racing Can-Am	(Spain) Eduard Pons	(Spain) Oriol Mena	3–4
Can-Am	BRP Can-Am Maverick XRS Turbo	South Racing Can-Am	(Spain) Eduard Pons	(Spain) Monica Plaza	5–8
Can-Am	BRP Can-Am Maverick XRS Turbo	South Racing Can-Am	(Colombia) Antonio Marmolejo	(Argentina) Ariel Jaton	8
Can-Am	BRP Can-Am Maverick XRS Turbo	Biedriba Sports Racing Technologies	(Lithuania) Egidijus Valeiša	(Lithuania) Mindaugas Varža	1–6
Can-Am	BRP Can-Am Maverick XRS Turbo		(Saudi Arabia) Saeed Al-Mouri	(Uruguay) Sergio Lafuente	2
Can-Am	BRP Can-Am Maverick XRS Turbo		(Saudi Arabia) Saeed Al-Mouri	(Jordan) Ata Hmoud	7
Can-Am	BRP Can-Am Maverick XRS Turbo	Baporo Motorsport	(Spain) Eduard Pons	(Spain) Oriol Mena	2
Can-Am	BRP Can-Am Maverick XRS Turbo	Baporo Motorsport	(Spain) Alexander Josef Toril	(Spain) José Luis Toril	4
Can-Am	BRP Can-Am Maverick XRS Turbo	Baporo Motorsport	(Austria) Freddy Fast	(Spain) Oriol Vidal	4
Can-Am	BRP Can-Am Maverick XRS Turbo		(Switzerland) Jerome de Sadeleer	(Netherlands) Wouter Rosegaar	4
Can-Am	BRP Can-Am Maverick XRS Turbo		(United Kingdom) Catie Munnings	(Poland) Szymon Gospodarczyk	4
Can-Am	BRP Can-Am Maverick XRS Turbo		(Portugal) Rui Oliveira	(Portugal) Pedro Oliveira	4
Can-Am	BRP Can-Am Maverick XRS Turbo	Nasser Racing	(Uruguay) Patricia Pita	(Spain) Alba Sanchez	4
Can-Am	BRP Can-Am Maverick XRS Turbo	Nasser Racing	(Lithuania) Emilija Gelažninkienė	(Lithuania) Arūnas Gelažninkas	4
Can-Am	BRP Can-Am Maverick XRS Turbo		(Mozambique) Paulo Oliveira	(Mozambique) Miguel Alberty	4
Can-Am	BRP Can-Am Maverick XRS Turbo	TH Trucks Team	(Spain) Pedro Manuel Peñate	(Spain) Luis Alejandro Hernandez	4
Can-Am	BRP Can-Am Maverick XRS Turbo	Energylandia Rally Team	(Poland) Marek Goczał	(Poland) Artur Janda	5
Can-Am	BRP Can-Am Maverick XRS Turbo	Energylandia Rally Team	(Poland) Marek Goczał	(Poland) Maciej Marton	8
Can-Am	BRP Can-Am Maverick XRS Turbo	Energylandia Rally Team	(Poland) Michał Goczał	(Poland) Szymon Gospodarczyk	5
Can-Am	BRP Can-Am Maverick XRS Turbo	Energylandia Rally Team	(Poland) Michał Goczał	(France) François Cazalet	8
Can-Am	BRP Can-Am Maverick XRS Turbo	Energylandia Rally Team	(Poland) Eryk Goczał	(Spain) Oriol Mena	8
Can-Am	BRP Can-Am Maverick XRS Turbo		(Portugal) Ricardo de Oliveira	(Portugal) Ana de Oliveira	6
Can-Am	BRP Can-Am Maverick XRS Turbo		(Portugal) João Paula	(Portugal) Nuno Mota Ribeiro	6
Polaris	Polaris RZR 64 Pro XP Turbo		(Poland) Tomasz Białkowski	(Poland) Dariusz Baskiewicz	1, 3–6
Polaris	Polaris RZR 64 Pro XP Turbo	Escuderia La Mota	(Spain) Federico Mogni	(Spain) David Aguado	4
Polaris	Polaris RZR 64 Pro XP Turbo		(Italy) Enrico Gaspari	(France) Loïc Minaudier	5
Yamaha	Yamaha YXZ 1000R	Yamaha GYTR	(Spain) Miquel Prat	(Spain) Alex Haro	4

== Results ==
=== Overall ===
Round	Rally name	Podium finishers			
Round	Rally name	Rank	Driver	Car	Time
1	Baja Russia - Northern Forest	1	(Russia) Vladimir Vasilyev (Latvia) Oleg Uperenko	Mini Cooper Countryman	4:43:34
1	Baja Russia - Northern Forest	2	(Russia) Sergey Uspenskiy (Russia) Marina Danilova	Toyota Hilux	4:50:58
1	Baja Russia - Northern Forest	3	(Russia) Anastasiya Nifontova (Russia) Ekaterina Zhadanova	BRP Can-Am Maverick X3	4:54:32
2	Jordan Baja	1	(Saudi Arabia) Saleh Alsaif (Russia) Egor Okhotnikov	BRP Can-Am Maverick X3	6:34:40
2	Jordan Baja	2	(Czech Republic) Miroslav Zapletal (Slovakia) Marek Sykora	Ford F150 EVO	6:37:36
2	Jordan Baja	3	(Kuwait) Mshari Al-Thefiri (France) François Cazalet	BRP Can-Am Maverick XRS Turbo	6:47:25
3	(Italy) Italian Baja	1	(Saudi Arabia) Yazeed Al-Rajhi (United Kingdom) Michael Orr	Toyota Hilux Overdrive	4:23:01
3	(Italy) Italian Baja	2	(Brazil) Cristiano Batista (Brazil) Wladimir Reis	BRP Can-Am Maverick XRS Turbo	4:45:32
3	(Italy) Italian Baja	3	(Czech Republic) Miroslav Zapletal (Slovakia) Marek Sykora	Hummer H3 EVO	4:46:03
4	(Spain) Baja España Aragón	1	(Qatar) Nasser Al-Attiyah (Andorra) Mathieu Baumel	Toyota GR DKR Hilux	7:20:43
4	(Spain) Baja España Aragón	2	(Saudi Arabia) Yazeed Al-Rajhi (United Kingdom) Michael Orr	Toyota Hilux Overdrive	7:23:45
4	(Spain) Baja España Aragón	3	(Brazil) Lucas Moraes (Brazil) Kaique Bentivoglio	Toyota Hilux Overdrive	7:26:09
5	Baja Poland	1	(Poland) Marek Goczał (Poland) Artur Janda	BRP Can-Am Maverick XRS Turbo	5:02:48
5	Baja Poland	2	(Czech Republic) Miroslav Zapletal (Slovakia) Marek Sykora	Hummer H3 EVO	5:04:37
5	Baja Poland	3	(Poland) Włodzimierz Grajek (Poland) Łukasz Łaskawiec	Toyota Hilux	5:05:32
6	(Portugal) Baja Portalegre 500	1	(Portugal) João Ferreira (Portugal) David Monteiro	Mini John Cooper Works Rally	5:43:56
6	(Portugal) Baja Portalegre 500	2	(Portugal) João Dias (Portugal) João Miranda	BRP Can-Am Maverick X3	5:44:18
6	(Portugal) Baja Portalegre 500	3	(Portugal) Luís Portela de Morais (Portugal) Tomas Dantas Neves	OT3	5:48:23
7	(Saudi Arabia) Saudi Baja	1	(Saudi Arabia) Yazeed Al-Rajhi (Germany) Dirk von Zitzewitz	Toyota Hilux Overdrive	4:18:55
7	(Saudi Arabia) Saudi Baja	2	(Czech Republic) Miroslav Zapletal (Slovakia) Marek Sykora	Ford F150 EVO	4:43:23
7	(Saudi Arabia) Saudi Baja	3	(Argentina) Fernando Álvarez (France) Xavier Panseri	BRP Can-Am Maverick X3	4:47:55
8	(United Arab Emirates) Dubai International Baja	1	(Saudi Arabia) Yazeed Al-Rajhi (Germany) Dirk von Zitzewitz	Toyota Hilux Overdrive	7:02:32
8	(United Arab Emirates) Dubai International Baja	2	(Brazil) Lucas Moraes (Germany) Timo Gottschalk	Toyota Hilux Overdrive	7:03:39
8	(United Arab Emirates) Dubai International Baja	3	(Poland) Eryk Goczał (Spain) Oriol Mena	BRP Can-Am Maverick XRS Turbo	7:18:44

=== T3 ===
Round	Rally name	Podium finishers			
Round	Rally name	Rank	Driver	Car	Time
1	Baja Russia - Northern Forest	1	(Russia) Anastasiya Nifontova (Russia) Ekaterina Zhadanova	BRP Can-Am Maverick X3	4:54:32
1	Baja Russia - Northern Forest	2	(Argentina) Fernando Álvarez (Argentina) José Luis Diaz	BRP Can-Am Maverick X3	4:59:35
1	Baja Russia - Northern Forest	3	(Russia) Vadim Fedotov (Russia) Aleksandr Kupriyanov	BRP Can-Am Maverick X3	5:03:51
2	Jordan Baja	1	(Saudi Arabia) Saleh Alsaif (Russia) Egor Okhotnikov	BRP Can-Am Maverick X3	6:34:40
2	Jordan Baja	2	(Argentina) Fernando Álvarez (France) Xavier Panseri	BRP Can-Am Maverick X3	7:00:24
2	Jordan Baja	3	(Russia) Pavel Silnov (Russia) Kirill Shubin	BRP Can-Am Maverick X3	7:02:34
3	(Italy) Italian Baja	1	(Netherlands) Erik Van Loon (France) Sebastien Delaunay	BRP Can-Am Maverick X3	4:53:17
3	(Italy) Italian Baja	2	(Saudi Arabia) Dania Akeel (France) Laurent Lichtleuchter	BRP Can-Am Maverick X3	5:03:49
3	(Italy) Italian Baja	3	(Spain) Pau Navarro (Spain) Pedro Lopez	BRP Can-Am Maverick X3	5:12:09
4	(Spain) Baja España Aragón	1	(Portugal) João Dias (Portugal) João Miranda	BRP Can-Am Maverick X3	7:55:50
4	(Spain) Baja España Aragón	2	(Spain) Dani Sordo (Spain) Candido Carrera	BRP Can-Am Maverick X3	7:58:03
4	(Spain) Baja España Aragón	3	(Portugal) Pedro Carvalho (Portugal) Nuno Morais	BRP Can-Am Maverick X3	8:01:33
5	Baja Poland	1	(Argentina) Fernando Álvarez (France) Xavier Panseri	BRP Can-Am Maverick X3	5:14:38
5	Baja Poland	2	(Saudi Arabia) Dania Akeel (France) Laurent Lichtleuchter	BRP Can-Am Maverick X3	5:36:56
5	Baja Poland	3	(Saudi Arabia) Mashael Alobaidan (Peru) Hector García	BRP Can-Am Maverick X3	6:01:30
6	(Portugal) Baja Portalegre 500	1	(Portugal) João Dias (Portugal) João Miranda	BRP Can-Am Maverick X3	5:44:18
6	(Portugal) Baja Portalegre 500	2	(Portugal) Luís Portela de Morais (Portugal) Tomas Dantas Neves	OT3	5:48:23
6	(Portugal) Baja Portalegre 500	3	(Argentina) Fernando Álvarez (France) Xavier Panseri	BRP Can-Am Maverick X3	6:20:05
7	(Saudi Arabia) Saudi Baja	1	(Argentina) Fernando Álvarez (France) Xavier Panseri	BRP Can-Am Maverick X3	4:47:55
7	(Saudi Arabia) Saudi Baja	2	(Saudi Arabia) Dania Akeel (Uruguay) Sergio Lafuente	BRP Can-Am Maverick X3	5:03:42
7	(Saudi Arabia) Saudi Baja	3	(Saudi Arabia) Mashael Alobaidan (Netherlands) Wouter Rosegaar	BRP Can-Am Maverick X3	5:19:32
8	(United Arab Emirates) Dubai International Baja	1	(Argentina) Fernando Álvarez (France) Xavier Panseri	BRP Can-Am Maverick X3	7:35:30
8	(United Arab Emirates) Dubai International Baja	2	(Saudi Arabia) Dania Akeel (Uruguay) Sergio Lafuente	BRP Can-Am Maverick X3	7:45:15
8	(United Arab Emirates) Dubai International Baja	3	(Saudi Arabia) Mashael Alobaidan (Italy) Paolo Ceci	BRP Can-Am Maverick X3	11:36:16

=== T4 ===
Round	Rally name	Podium finishers			
Round	Rally name	Rank	Driver	Car	Time
1	Baja Russia - Northern Forest	1	(Russia) Sergei Remennik (Russia) Yaroslav Fedorov	BRP Can-Am Maverick XRS Turbo RR	4:55:32
1	Baja Russia - Northern Forest	2	(Spain) Miguel Angel Valero (Spain) Jaqueline Ricci	BRP Can-Am Maverick XRS Turbo RR	5:08:21
1	Baja Russia - Northern Forest	3	(Saudi Arabia) Yousef Aldhaif (Saudi Arabia) Omar Allahim	BRP Can-Am Maverick XRS Turbo RR	5:36:07
2	Jordan Baja	1	(Kuwait) Mshari Al-Thefiri (France) François Cazalet	BRP Can-Am Maverick XRS Turbo	6:47:25
2	Jordan Baja	2	(Netherlands) Kees Koolen (Netherlands) Mirjam Pol	BRP Can-Am Maverick XRS Turbo	6:52:13
2	Jordan Baja	3	(Saudi Arabia) Saeed Al-Mouri (Uruguay) Sergio Lafuente	BRP Can-Am Maverick XRS Turbo	7:11:25
3	(Italy) Italian Baja	1	(Brazil) Cristiano Batista (Brazil) Wladimir Reis	BRP Can-Am Maverick XRS Turbo	4:45:32
3	(Italy) Italian Baja	2	(Netherlands) Kees Koolen (Italy) Paolo Ceci	BRP Can-Am Maverick XRS Turbo	4:51:17
3	(Italy) Italian Baja	3	(Spain) Eduard Pons (Spain) Oriol Mena	BRP Can-Am Maverick XRS Turbo	5:01:09
4	(Spain) Baja España Aragón	1	(Switzerland) Jerome de Sadeleer (Netherlands) Wouter Rosegaar	BRP Can-Am Maverick XRS Turbo	8:10:03
4	(Spain) Baja España Aragón	2	(Brazil) Cristiano Batista (Brazil) Wladimir Reis	BRP Can-Am Maverick XRS Turbo	8:10:19
4	(Spain) Baja España Aragón	3	(Kuwait) Mshari Al-Thefiri (Qatar) Nasser Al Kuwari	BRP Can-Am Maverick XRS Turbo	8:16:42
5	Baja Poland	1	(Poland) Marek Goczał (Poland) Artur Janda	BRP Can-Am Maverick XRS Turbo	5:02:48
5	Baja Poland	2	(Kuwait) Mshari Al-Thefiri (Spain) Oriol Vidal	BRP Can-Am Maverick XRS Turbo	5:12:20
5	Baja Poland	3	(Netherlands) Kees Koolen (Italy) Paolo Ceci	BRP Can-Am Maverick XRS Turbo	5:13:30
6	(Portugal) Baja Portalegre 500	1	(Brazil) Cristiano Batista (Portugal) Fausto Mota	BRP Can-Am Maverick XRS Turbo	6:00:26
6	(Portugal) Baja Portalegre 500	2	(Kuwait) Mshari Al-Thefiri (Spain) Oriol Vidal	BRP Can-Am Maverick XRS Turbo	6:11:27
6	(Portugal) Baja Portalegre 500	3	(Poland) Tomasz Białkowski (Poland) Dariusz Baskiewicz	Polaris RZR 64 Pro XP Turbo	6:12:03
7	(Saudi Arabia) Saudi Baja	1	(Brazil) Cristiano Batista (Portugal) Fausto Mota	BRP Can-Am Maverick XRS Turbo	4:56:27
7	(Saudi Arabia) Saudi Baja	2	(Spain) Eduard Pons (Spain) Monica Plaza	BRP Can-Am Maverick XRS Turbo	4:59:29
7	(Saudi Arabia) Saudi Baja	3	(Saudi Arabia) Saeed Al-Mouri (Jordan) Ata Hmoud	BRP Can-Am Maverick XRS Turbo	5:24:00
8	(United Arab Emirates) Dubai International Baja	1	(Poland) Eryk Goczał (Spain) Oriol Mena	BRP Can-Am Maverick XRS Turbo	6:58:44
8	(United Arab Emirates) Dubai International Baja	2	(Poland) Michał Goczał (France) François Cazalet	BRP Can-Am Maverick XRS Turbo	6:59:33
8	(United Arab Emirates) Dubai International Baja	3	(Poland) Marek Goczał (Poland) Maciej Marton	BRP Can-Am Maverick XRS Turbo	7:00:13

== Championship standings ==
Points system

- Points for final positions are awarded as per the following table:

Position	1st	2nd	3rd	4th	5th	6th	7th	8th	9th	10th	11th	12th	13th	14th	15th
Overall points	30	25	20	17	15	13	10	9	8	7	6	5	4	3	2
Leg Points	5	4	3	2	1	0									

For the 2022 season points will be awarded to the top five finishing positions of each leg on each event. These points will only be awarded if the driver finishes in the overall classification of each event. If they do not then no leg points are awarded, but the following vehicles will not move up a position for leg points.

=== FIA World Cup for Drivers, Co-Drivers, and Teams ===
==== Drivers' & Co-Drivers' championships ====
Pos	Driver	RUS (Russia)	JOR (Jordan)	ITA (Italy)	ESP (Spain)	POL (Poland)	POR (Portugal)	SAU (Saudi Arabia)	DUB (United Arab Emirates)	Points
1	(Saudi Arabia) Yazeed Al-Rajhi	Ret	11^{10}	1^{40}	2^{34}	Ret	26^{5}	1^{40}	4^{22}	151
2	(Czech Republic) Miroslav Zapletal		2^{31}	3^{26}	16	2^{31}		2^{31}	6^{13}	132
3	(Argentina) Fernando Álvarez	5^{17}	5^{16}	9^{8}	35	6^{13}	12^{5}	3^{26}	7^{10}	90
4	(Brazil) Cristiano Batista	Ret	10^{6}	2^{32}	13^{4}		5^{17}	4^{21}	11^{6}	86
5	(Netherlands) Kees Koolen		4^{21}	4^{19}	37	5^{16}	14^{3}	9^{9}	10^{7}	75
6	(Kuwait) Mshari Al-Thefiri		3^{23}	13^{4}	14^{3}	4^{19}	9^{8}	12^{5}	8^{9}	68
7	(Poland) Marek Goczał					1^{39}			3^{25}	64
8	(Saudi Arabia) Dania Akeel	11^{6}	8^{8}	7^{10}	38	8^{9}	18	6^{14}	9^{8}	55
9	(Saudi Arabia) Saleh Alsaif	9^{8}	1^{37}					10^{7}		52
10	(Brazil) Lucas Moraes				3^{27}				5^{20}	47
11	(Portugal) João Dias				6^{13}		2^{31}			44
12	(Spain) Eduard Pons		NC	6^{13}	15^{2}	7^{11}	Ret	5^{17}	20	43
13	(Poland) Michał Goczał					12^{10}			2^{31}	41
14	(Russia) Vladimir Vasilyev	1^{40}								40
15	(Qatar) Nasser Al-Attiyah				1^{38}					38
16	(Portugal) João Ferreira				Ret		1^{38}			38
17	(Poland) Eryk Goczał								1^{38}	38
18	(Russia) Sergey Uspenskiy	2^{32}								32
19	(Russia) Anastasiya Nifontova	3^{27}								27
20	(Poland) Włodzimierz Grajek					3^{26}				26
21	(Russia) Pavel Silnov	7^{10}	6^{14}							24
22	(Portugal) Luís Portela de Morais						3^{23}			23
23	(Saudi Arabia) Mashael Alobaidan	15^{2}		17	46	10^{7}	27	7^{10}	13^{4}	23
24	(Russia) Sergei Remennik	4^{21}								21
25	(Netherlands) Erik Van Loon			5^{18}	53^{2}				18	20
26	(Spain) Daniel Alonso				4^{18}					18
27	(Portugal) Tiago Reis						4^{18}			18
28	(Saudi Arabia) Saeed Al-Mouri		7^{9}					8^{9}		18
29	(Poland) Tomasz Białkowski	Ret		16^{2}	20	9^{8}	10^{7}			17
30	(Russia) Armen Puzian	10^{7}	9^{10}							17
31	(Spain) Luis Recuenco				5^{15}		Ret			15
32	(Spain) Pau Navarro			8^{9}	23	11^{6}	24			15
33	(Portugal) Francisco Barreto						6^{13}			13
34	(Russia) Vadim Fedotov	6^{13}								13
35	(Portugal) Lourenço Rosa						8^{11}			11
36	(Spain) Ricardo Ramilo	13^{4}		10^{7}	17	Ret				11
37	(Spain) Santiago Carnicer				7^{10}					10
38	(Portugal) Nuno Madeira						7^{10}			10
39	(Spain) Dani Sordo				8^{9}					9
40	(Spain) Miguel Angel Valero	8^{9}			26		Ret			9
41	(Portugal) Miguel Barbosa						11^{9}			9
42	(Portugal) Alejandro Martins				9^{8}		Ret			8
43	(Netherlands) Anja Van Loon			12^{5}	44				14^{3}	8
44	(Portugal) Pedro Carvalho				10^{7}		Ret			7
45	(Qatar) Mohammed Al Atteya							11^{6}		6
46	(Czech Republic) Petr Hozak				11^{6}		Ret			6
47	(Argentina) Juan Cruz Yacopini			11^{6}	51					6
48	(Portugal) Filipe Nascimento	16	12^{4}		32		15^{2}			6
49	(Switzerland) Jerome de Sadeleer				12^{5}					5
50	(Egypt) Ahmed El Shamy								12^{5}	5
51	(Spain) Enrique Reyes	12^{5}			Ret					5
52	(Lithuania) Egidijus Valeiša	Ret	13^{3}	15^{2}	25	Ret	Ret			5
53	(Saudi Arabia) Yousef Al-Daif	14^{3}	14^{2}							5
54	(Poland) Tomasz Baranowski					13^{4}	21			4
55	(Portugal) Aloisio Monteiro						13^{4}			4
56	(Poland) Grzegorz Brochocki			14^{3}						3
57	(Oman) Abdullah Al Zubair								15^{2}	2
58	(Belgium) Guillaume De Mevius				54^{1}					1
	(Colombia) Antonio Marmolejo						31		16	0
	(Portugal) Jorge Cardoso						16			0
	(Russia) Evgenii Sukhovenko	17								0
	(Portugal) Ricardo de Oliveira						17			0
	(South Africa) Geoffrey Minnitt								17	0
	(Italy) Emilio Ferroni			18						0
	(Spain) Miquel Prat				18					0
	(Spain) Cristina Giampaoli				19					0
	(United Arab Emirates) Khalid Aljafla								19	0
	(France) Lionel Costes				21					0
	(Portugal) Edgar Condenso				22		22			0
	(Portugal) Maria Gameiro				43		23			0
	(United Kingdom) Catie Munnings				24					0
	(Portugal) Filipe Carvalho				Ret		25			0
	(Spain) Alexander Josef Toril				27					0
	(Netherlands) Vick Versteijnen				28					0
	(Portugal) Pedro Ruivo						28			0
	(Portugal) Rui Oliveira				29					0
	(Uruguay) Paticia Pita				30					0
	(Portugal) João Paula						30			0
	(France) Benoit Soulas				31					0
	(Spain) Federico Mogni				33					0
	(Hungary) Pal Lonyai				34		Ret			0
	(Spain) David Nogareda				36					0
	(Spain) Manuel Plaza				39					0
	(Mozambique) Paulo Oliveira				40					0
	(Spain) Pedro Peñate				41					0
	(Andorra) Jordi Pons				42					0
	(Austria) Freddy Fast				45					0
	(Lithuania) Emilija Gelažninkienė				47					0
	(Spain) Domingo Román				48					0
	(Spain) Roberto Rodriguez				49		Ret			0
	(Portugal) Nelson Beiro				50		Ret			0
	(Spain) Santiago Navarro				58					0
	(Czech Republic) František Brutovský			Ret		Ret				0
	(Russia) Alexander Rusanov	Ret								0
	(Italy) Andrea Alfano			Ret						0
	(Hungary) 'Csucsu'			Ret						0
	(France) Mathieu Serradori				Ret					0
	(Italy) Enrico Gaspari					Ret				0
Pos	Driver	RUS (Russia)	JOR (Jordan)	ITA (Italy)	ESP (Spain)	POL (Poland)	POR (Portugal)	SAU (Saudi Arabia)	DUB (United Arab Emirates)	Points

Pos	Co-Driver	RUS (Russia)	JOR (Jordan)	ITA (Italy)	ESP (Spain)	POL (Poland)	POR (Portugal)	SAU (Saudi Arabia)	DUB (United Arab Emirates)	Points
1	(Slovakia) Marek Sykora		2^{31}	3^{26}	16	2^{31}	Ret	2^{31}	6^{13}	132
2	(United Kingdom) Michael Orr	Ret	11^{10}	1^{40}	2^{34}	Ret				84
3	(France) Xavier Panseri		5^{16}	9^{8}	35	6^{13}	12^{5}	3^{26}	7^{10}	78
4	(Germany) Dirk von Zitzewitz						26^{5}	1^{40}	4^{22}	67
5	(France) François Cazalet		3^{23}		54^{1}		27		2^{31}	55
6	(Spain) Oriol Mena		NC	6^{13}	15^{2}				1^{38}	53
7	(Italy) Paolo Ceci			4^{19}	37	5^{16}	14^{3}	9^{9}	13^{4}	51
8	(Russia) Egor Okhotnikov	9^{8}	1^{37}							45
9	(Portugal) João Miranda				6^{13}		2^{31}			44
10	(Portugal) Fausto Mota						5^{17}	4^{21}	11^{6}	44
11	(Brazil) Wladimir Reis	Ret	10^{6}	2^{32}	13^{4}					42
12	(Spain) Oriol Vidal				45	4^{19}	9^{8}	12^{5}	8^{9}	41
13	(Latvia) Oleg Uperenko	1^{40}								40
14	(Poland) Artur Janda					1^{39}				39
15	(Andorra) Mathieu Baumel				1^{38}					38
16	(Portugal) David Monteiro				Ret		1^{38}			38
17	(France) Laurent Lichtleuchter	11^{6}	8^{8}	7^{10}		8^{9}	18			33
18	(Russia) Marina Danilova	2^{32}								32
19	(Uruguay) Sergio Lafuente		7^{9}					6^{14}	9^{8}	31
20	(Poland) Maciej Marton					13^{4}	21		3^{25}	29
21	(Spain) Monica Plaza					7^{11}	Ret	5^{17}	20	28
22	(Brazil) Kaique Bentivoglio				3^{27}					27
23	(Russia) Ekaterina Zhadanova	3^{27}								27
24	(Poland) Łukasz Łaskawiec					3^{26}				26
25	(Russia) Kirill Shubin	7^{10}	6^{14}							24
26	(Portugal) Tomas Dantas Neves						3^{23}			23
27	(Netherlands) Wouter Rosegaar				12^{5}			7^{10}	10^{7}	22
28	(Russia) Yaroslav Fedorov	4^{21}								21
29	(Netherlands) Mirjam Pol		4^{21}							21
30	(France) Sebastien Delaunay			5^{18}	53^{2}				18	20
31	(Germany) Timo Gottschalk								5^{20}	20
32	(Portugal) Valter Cardoso						4^{18}			18
33	(Spain) Alejandro Lopez				4^{18}					18
34	(Argentina) José Luis Diaz	5^{17}								17
35	(Poland) Dariusz Baskiewicz	Ret		16^{2}	20	9^{8}	10^{7}			17
36	(Russia) Evgenii Zagorodniuk	10^{7}	9^{10}							17
37	(Spain) Sergio Peinado				5^{15}					15
38	(Russia) Aleksandr Kupriyanov	6^{13}								13
39	(Portugal) Carlos Silva						6^{13}			13
40	(Portugal) Joaquim Dias						8^{11}			11
41	(Spain) Francisco Javier López	13^{4}		10^{7}						11
42	(Portugal) José Janela						7^{10}			10
43	(Spain) Miguel Lázaro				7^{10}					10
44	(Poland) Szymon Gospodarczyk				24	12^{10}				10
45	(Spain) Candido Carrera				8^{9}					9
46	(Jordan) Ata Hmoud							8^{9}		9
47	(Spain) Pedro López			8^{9}						9
48	(Spain) Jaqueline Ricci	8^{9}			26					9
49	(Portugal) Hugo Magalhães						11^{9}			9
50	(Portugal) José Marques				9^{8}		Ret			8
51	(Saudi Arabia) Tariq Al-Rammah							10^{7}		7
52	(Peru) Hector García					10^{7}				7
53	(Portugal) Nuno Morais				10^{7}					7
54	(Qatar) Nasser Al Kuwari			13^{4}	14^{3}					7
55	(Saudi Arabia) Omar Allahim	14^{3}	14^{2}						15^{2}	7
56	(Argentina) Matias Acosta			11^{6}						6
57	(Czech Republic) Rene Kilian				11^{6}					6
58	(France) Michael Metge				58	11^{6}	24			6
59	(United Arab Emirates) Ali Mirza							11^{6}		6
60	(Portugal) João Serodio	16	12^{4}		32		15^{2}			6
61	(Netherlands) Lisette Bakker			12^{5}	44					5
62	(Egypt) Obaid Hassan								12^{5}	5
63	(Spain) Jorge Saiz	12^{5}								5
64	(Lithuania) Mindaugas Varža	Ret	13^{3}	15^{2}	25	Ret	Ret			5
65	(Portugal) Eduardo Oiteiro						13^{4}			4
66	(Poland) Grzegorz Komar			14^{3}						3
67	(Ukraine) Dmytro Tsyro								14^{3}	3
68	(Russia) Alexey Kuzmich	15^{2}								2
	(Portugal) André Barras						16			0
	(Argentina) Ariel Jaton								16	0
	(Spain) Armand Monleon			17	46					0
	(Russia) Kirill Chapaev	17								0
	(Argentina) Bruno Jacomy				17					0
	(Portugal) Ana de Oliveira						17			0
	(Portugal) Pedro Santos								17	0
	(Italy) Daniele Fiorini			18						0
	(Spain) Alex Haro				18					0
	(Argentina) Ricardo Torlaschi				19					0
	(Russia) Andrei Rudnitski								19	0
	(France) Paul Costes				21					0
	(Portugal) Soraia Chambel				22	Ret				0
	(Portugal) António Serrão						22			0
	(Spain) Manuel Navarro				43		23			0
	(Spain) Victor González				23					0
	(Portugal) Paulo Torres						25			0
	(Spain) José Luis Toril				27					0
	(Netherlands) Teun van Dal				28					0
	(Portugal) Filipe Rasteiro						28			0
	(Portugal) Pedro Oliveira				29					0
	(Spain) Alba Sanchez				30					0
	(Portugal) Nuno Mota Ribeiro						30			0
	(France) Thomas Lacoste				31					0
	(Spain) Xavier Montasell						31			0
	(Spain) David Aguado				33					0
	(Hungary) Nikolett Szoke				34		Ret			0
	(Spain) Joan Rubi				36					0
	(France) Stephane Duple				38					0
	(Spain) Marta Plaza				39					0
	(Mozambique) Miguel Alberty				40					0
	(Spain) Luis Hernandez				41					0
	(Spain) Jessica Nebra				42					0
	(Lithuania) Arūnas Gelažninkas				47					0
	(Spain) Susana Hernando				48					0
	(Spain) Herman Rodriguez				49		Ret			0
	(Portugal) Manuel Porem				50					0
	(Argentina) Fernando Acosta				51					0
	(Czech Republic) Petr Hauptmann			Ret		Ret				0
	(France) Loïc Minaudier				Ret	Ret				0
	(Russia) Evgeny Pavlov	Ret								0
	(Italy) Carmen Marsiglia			Ret						0
	(Hungary) Márk Mesterházi			Ret						0
	(Spain) Fina Román				Ret					0
	(Portugal) Maria Carvalho				Ret					0
	(Portugal) Jorge Monteiro						Ret			0
	(Spain) Vanesa Viso						Ret			0
	(Portugal) André Guerreiro						Ret			0
	(Portugal) Rui Gomes						Ret			0
Pos	Co-Driver	RUS (Russia)	JOR (Jordan)	ITA (Italy)	ESP (Spain)	POL (Poland)	POR (Portugal)	SAU (Saudi Arabia)	DUB (United Arab Emirates)	Points

==== Teams championship ====
Pos	Team	RUS (Russia)	JOR (Jordan)	ITA (Italy)	ESP (Spain)	POL (Poland)	POR (Portugal)	SAU (Saudi Arabia)	DUB (United Arab Emirates)	Points
1	South Racing Can-Am	43	55		32	45	50	62		270
2	Overdrive Racing	0	15	50	55		42	30	37	229
3	Energylandia Rally Team					45			55	100
4	Nakusi Racing Team	35	37							72
5	FN Speed Team			25	22	17				64
6	Automovil Club Alcalans	27			7					34
7	PRK Sport Rallye Team				30					30
8	VF Team	25								25
9	Sports Racing Technologies			17	8					25
10	G Rally Team				6					6
11	Metal Lube Rally Raid Team				5					5
Pos	Team	RUS (Russia)	JOR (Jordan)	ITA (Italy)	ESP (Spain)	POL (Poland)	POR (Portugal)	SAU (Saudi Arabia)	DUB (United Arab Emirates)	Points

=== FIA T3 World Cup for Drivers ===
==== Drivers' championship ====
Pos	Driver	RUS (Russia)	JOR (Jordan)	ITA (Italy)	ESP (Spain)	POL (Poland)	POR (Portugal)	SAU (Saudi Arabia)	DUB (United Arab Emirates)	Points
1	(Argentina) Fernando Álvarez	2^{33}	2^{31}	4^{22}	11^{6}	1^{40}	3^{22}	1^{40}	1^{39}	205
2	(Saudi Arabia) Dania Akeel	7^{10}	4^{20}	2^{32}	12^{5}	2^{32}	7^{10}	2^{33}	2^{34}	161
3	(Saudi Arabia) Mashael Alobaidan	10^{7}		7^{10}	15^{2}	3^{26}	10^{7}	3^{25}	3^{25}	95
4	(Portugal) João Dias				1^{38}		1^{40}			78
5	(Saudi Arabia) Saleh Alsaif	5^{17}	1^{39}					4^{22}		78
6	(Spain) Pau Navarro			3^{25}	7^{10}	4^{22}	8^{10}			67
7	(Russia) Pavel Silnov	4^{21}	3^{26}							47
8	(Spain) Ricardo Ramilo	9^{8}		5^{18}	4^{18}	Ret				44
9	(Portugal) Filipe Nascimento	11^{6}	6^{13}		10^{7}		5^{16}			42
10	(Russia) Anastasiya Nifontova	1^{40}								40
11	(Netherlands) Erik Van Loon			1^{40}						40
12	(Netherlands) Anja Van Loon			6^{13}	14^{3}				4^{20}	36
13	(Russia) Armen Puzian	6^{13}	5^{21}							34
14	(Portugal) Luís Portela de Morais						2^{33}			33
15	(Spain) Dani Sordo				2^{32}					32
16	(Portugal) Pedro Carvalho				3^{26}		Ret			26
17	(Russia) Vadim Fedotov	3^{26}								26
18	(Portugal) Aloisio Monteiro						4^{20}			20
19	(Qatar) Mohammed Al Atteya							5^{17}		17
20	(Spain) Cristina Giampaoli				5^{17}					17
21	(South Africa) Geoffrey Minnitt								5^{17}	17
22	(United Arab Emirates) Khalid Aljafla								6^{15}	15
23	(France) Lionel Costes				6^{14}					14
24	(Portugal) Jorge Cardoso						6^{13}			13
25	(Spain) Enrique Reyes	8^{9}			Ret					9
26	(Netherlands) Vick Versteijnen				8^{9}					9
27	(Portugal) Filipe Carvalho						9^{8}			8
28	(France) Benoit Soulas				9^{8}					8
29	(Portugal) Pedro Ruivo						11^{6}			6
30	(Colombia) Antonio Marmolejo						12^{5}			5
31	(Belgium) Guillaume De Mevius				18^{5}					5
32	(Andorra) Jordi Pons				13^{4}					4
	(Spain) Roberto Rodriguez				16		Ret			0
	(Portugal) Nelson Beiro				17		Ret			0
	(Spain) Santiago Navarro				20					0
Pos	Driver	RUS (Russia)	JOR (Jordan)	ITA (Italy)	ESP (Spain)	POL (Poland)	POR (Portugal)	SAU (Saudi Arabia)	DUB (United Arab Emirates)	Points

=== FIA T4 World Cup for Drivers and Teams ===
==== Drivers' championship ====
Pos	Driver	RUS (Russia)	JOR (Jordan)	ITA (Italy)	ESP (Spain)	POL (Poland)	POR (Portugal)	SAU (Saudi Arabia)	DUB (United Arab Emirates)	Points
1	(Brazil) Cristiano Batista	Ret	4^{21}	1^{40}	2^{34}		1^{36}	1^{38}	6^{13}	182
2	(Kuwait) Mshari Al-Thefiri		1^{39}	4^{20}	3^{26}	2^{31}	2^{33}	5^{19}	4^{20}	169
3	(Netherlands) Kees Koolen		2^{31}	2^{32}	14^{3}	3^{24}	4^{19}	4^{22}	5^{16}	144
4	(Spain) Eduard Pons		7^{13}	3^{23}	4^{19}	4^{22}	Ret	2^{34}	8^{2}	113
5	(Poland) Tomasz Białkowski	Ret		6^{17}	6^{15}	5^{16}	3^{26}			74
6	(Poland) Marek Goczał					1^{39}			3^{27}	66
7	(Poland) Michał Goczał					6^{18}			2^{33}	51
8	(Saudi Arabia) Saeed Al-Mouri		3^{23}					3^{24}		47
9	(Lithuania) Egidijus Valeisa	Ret	5^{19}	5^{18}	8^{9}	Ret	Ret			46
10	(Spain) Miguel Angel Valero	2^{33}			9^{8}		Ret			41
11	(Russia) Sergei Remennik	1^{40}								40
12	(Switzerland) Jerome de Sadeleer				1^{39}					39
13	(Poland) Eryk Goczał								1^{39}	39
14	(Saudi Arabia) Yousef Al-Daif	3^{26}	6^{13}							39
15	(Portugal) Ricardo de Oliveira						5^{16}			16
16	(Spain) Miquel Prat				5^{16}					16
17	(Portugal) João Paula						6^{13}			13
18	(United Kingdom) Catie Munnings				7^{11}					11
19	(Colombia) Antonio Marmolejo								7^{10}	10
20	(Spain) Alexander Josef Toril				10^{7}					7
21	(Portugal) Rui Oliveira				11^{6}					6
22	(Uruguay) Patricia Pita				12^{5}					5
23	(Spain) Federico Mogni				13^{4}					4
24	(Mozambique) Paulo Oliveira				15^{2}					2
	(Spain) Pedro Manuel Peñate				16					0
	(Austria) Freddy Fast				17					0
	(Lithuania) Emilija Gelažninkienė				18					0
	(Italy) Enrico Gaspari					Ret				0
Pos	Driver	RUS (Russia)	JOR (Jordan)	ITA (Italy)	ESP (Spain)	POL (Poland)	POR (Portugal)	SAU (Saudi Arabia)	DUB (United Arab Emirates)	Points

==== Teams championship ====
Pos	Team	RUS (Russia)	JOR (Jordan)	ITA (Italy)	ESP (Spain)	POL (Poland)	POR (Portugal)	SAU (Saudi Arabia)	DUB (United Arab Emirates)	Points
1	South Racing Can-Am		55		55	45	75	75	37	302
2	Energylandia Rally Team					47			55	102
3	Sports Racing Technologies			30	20					50
4	Automovil Club Alcalans	30			17					47
Pos	Team	RUS (Russia)	JOR (Jordan)	ITA (Italy)	ESP (Spain)	POL (Poland)	POR (Portugal)	SAU (Saudi Arabia)	DUB (United Arab Emirates)	Points
