= Arcadio Arteaga =

Spanish footballer and manager

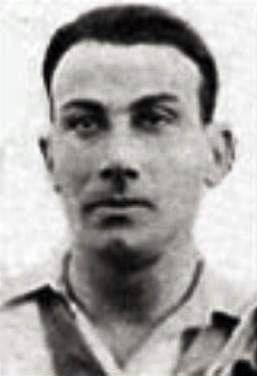
- Arcadio Arteaga

Personal information
- Full name: Arcadio Arteaga Oñate
- Date of birth: 6 December 1902
- Place of birth: Bilbao, Biscay, Spain
- Date of death: Unknown
- Position: Midfielder

Senior career*
Years	Team	Apps	(Gls)
1922–1924	SD Erandio Club		
1924–1928	Athletic Bilbao		
1928–1932	Atlético Madrid		

Managerial career
- 1932–1933: Atlético Madrid
- 1934–1935: AD Ferroviaria
- 1935–1936: CD Badajoz
- 1940–1941: Recreativo de Huelva
- 1941–1943: UD Salamanca
- 1943–1944: SD Ceuta
- 1944–1945: Real Valladolid
- 1946–1947: CD Logroñés
- * Club domestic league appearances and goals

Arcadio Arteaga Oñate (6 December 1902), also known by his nickname Quirico Arteaga, was a Spanish footballer who played as a midfielder for Athletic Bilbao and Atlético Madrid.

He later became a manager, taking charge over Atlético Madrid, Recreativo de Huelva, and Real Valladolid.

== Playing career ==
Arteaga was born in the Biscayan town of Bilbao on 6 December 1902, and he began his football career at SD Erandio Club in 1922, at the age of 19. While there, he stood out as a solid midfielder, so he eventually became part of the first team of Athletic Bilbao in 1924, making his official debut on 11 October 1925, helping his side to a 5–0 win over Sestao Sport Club. He remained at Athletic Club until 1928, playing a total of 34 competitive matches, including 9 Copa del Rey games and 25 in the Biscay Championship, which he won three times in 1925–26, 1926–27, and 1927–28.

In 1928, Arteaga signed for Atlético Madrid, making his official debut as a colchonero on 16 September 1928 in a Centro Regional Championship fixture against the CD Nacional de Madrid, which ended in a 3–1 victory. Together with Ricardo Zulueta, Cosme Vázquez, and the Olaso brothers (Alfonso and Luis), he was a member of the Atlético team that played in the inaugural La Liga season in 1929, although he was unable to avoid his team being relegated to the Segunda División. In Atlético, he formed a memorable midfield with Victoriano de Santos and Eduardo Ordóñez, which became known as the "three musketeers". He hung up his boots in 1932, at the end of his fourth season at Atlético.

In total, Arteaga played 104 official matches, 37 in the Biscay Championship, 11 in the cup, and 56 in the league, 36 of which in the first division, but he never managed to score a single goal.

== Managerial career ==
After his career as a player ended, Arteaga remained linked to Atlético Madrid as a coach, taking charge of the club for a brief period of time at the end of the 1932–33 season. He oversaw a total of six matches with a balance of three wins, two losses, and a draw, plus 13 goals scored and 9 conceded. After leaving Atlético, he coached another Madrid team, the AD Ferroviaria, before signing in 1936 for CD Badajoz.

After the Spanish Civil War ended in 1939, Arteaga directed Recreativo de Huelva in the 1940–41 season, from where he then moved to UD Salamanca, which he coached from 1941 to 1943 in the Second Division. In his first season at the club, he signed Pruden from Atlético Aviación, the top scorer of the first division in the previous season, and this investment paid off as they ended up having an excellent campaign and qualified in second position to play for promotion to the top division, and although they did not achieve it, Arteaga went down in history as the first sports director in Salamanca's history to compete for a promotion to the top division. In a second unfortunate season, Arteaga was dismissed in May 1943, following its relegation to the third division. Days before his dismissal, Salamanca lost 5–1 to Real Madrid in the first leg of the 1943 Copa del Generalísimo, and he responded forcefully to a question about the return fixture, stating, "Salamanca in Calvary will, yes, make the greatest of its efforts; because the opposite would not be his norm and would also constitute a serious sin of unsportsmanlike behavior".

His next team was SD Ceuta in the 1943–44 season in the Second Division. Arteaga was then commissioned by Real Valladolid in the 1944–45 season, to raise a team that had just been relegated to third division, but he was not able to achieve it. In 1944–45, however, Valladolid reached the final of the 1944–45 Copa Federación de España, which ended in a 0–1 loss to FC Martinenc. In 1945 his name was considered to be named the Spanish national manager, although he was finally not chosen for the position, which Jacinto Quincoces went on to hold.

In 1946 he refused to coach Cartagena FC, accepting the offer of CD Logroñés, which he would coach, in the third division in the 1946–47 season.

From that moment on, there are no more references to his sporting career, nor is there any date on which his death occurred. His name does not appear among those who, starting in 1949, obtained the title of coach in Spain.

== Honours ==
=== Player ===
Athletic Bilbao

- Biscay Championship: 1925–26, 1926–27, and 1927–28

=== Manager ===
Real Valladolid

- Copa Federación de España: Runner-up in 1944–45
