= 2023 FIA World Cup for Cross-Country Bajas =

2023 FIA World Cup for Cross-Country Bajas
Previous:	2022	Next:	2024

The 2023 FIA World Cup for Cross-Country Bajas is the fifth season of the FIA World Cup for Cross-Country Bajas; an annual competition for baja rally events for cars, buggies, and side-by-sides held in multiple countries.

== Calendar ==
The initial calendar for the 2023 world cup features eight cross-country baja events. The calendar was revised in March. Some events on the schedule are shared with the 2023 FIM Bajas World Cup.

Round	Dates	Rally name
1	2—4 February	(Saudi Arabia) Saudi Baja
2	16–18 March	Qatar International Baja
3	7–9 July	(Italy) 30º Italian Baja
4	20–23 July	(Spain) Baja España Aragón
5	24–27 August	Baja Poland
6	26–28 October	(Portugal) Baja Portalegre 500
7	9–11 November	(United Arab Emirates) Dubai International Baja
8	23–25 November	Jordan Baja

== Regulation ==
The following groups and classes are allowed:

- Group T1 - Prototype Cross-Country Vehicles
  - T1.1 - T1 4x4 - Petrol and Diesel
  - T1.2 - T1 4x2 - Petrol and Diesel
- Group T2 - Series Production Cross-Country Vehicles - Petrol and Diesel
- Group T3 - Lightweight Prototypes Cross-Country Vehicles
- Group T4 - Lightweight Series Production Cross-Country Side-by-Side Vehicles

The FIA awards the world cup to drivers, co-drivers, teams, T3 and T4 drivers and T4 teams.

== Teams and drivers ==
T1 & T2 Teams & Drivers
Constructor	Car	Team	Driver	Co-driver	Rounds
BAIC	BJ40	BAIC ORV	(China) Zhang Guoyu	(Spain) Oriol Mena	2
BAIC	BJ40	BAIC ORV	(China) Zi Yunliang	(China) Sha He	2
Ford	F150 EVO	Offroad Sport CZ	(Czech Republic) Miroslav Zapletal	(Slovakia) Marek Sykora	3
Ford	F150 EVO	Ming Racing Sports	(Czech Republic) František Brutovský	(Czech Republic) Petr Hauptmann	3
Ford	Ford Ranger T1+	M-Sport Ford World Rally Team	(Spain) Nani Roma	(Spain) Alex Haro	4
Ford	Ford Ranger T1+	M-Sport Ford World Rally Team	(South Africa) Gareth Woolridge	(South Africa) Boyd Dreyer	4
Mini	John Cooper Works Rally Plus	X-Raid Mini JCW Team	(Poland) Krzysztof Hołowczyc	(Poland) Lukasz Kurzeja	1–4
Mini	John Cooper Works Rally Plus	X-Raid Mini JCW Team	(Portugal) João Ferreira	(Portugal) Filipe Palmeiro	3–4
Mini	John Cooper Works Rally Plus	X-Raid Mini JCW Team	(Poland) Michał Maluszynski	(Poland) Szymon Gospodarczyk	3
Mini	John Cooper Works Rally Plus	X-Raid Mini JCW Team	(Argentina) Sebastian Halpern	(Argentina) Bernardo Graue	4
Mini	John Cooper Works Rally Plus	Unique Racing Team	(Lithuania) Vaidotas Žala	(Portugal) Paulo Fiuza	4
Mitsubishi	Pajero DID		(Italy) Stefano Moro	(Italy) Francesco Proietti	2
Nissan	Patrol	Team Al-Thunayyan Racing	(Saudi Arabia) Majed Al-Thunayyan	(Saudi Arabia) Fahad Al-Sufyani	2
Suzuki	New Gran Vitara		(Italy) Alfio Bordonaro	(Italy) Stefano Lovisa	3
Suzuki	New Gran Vitara		(San Marino) Lorenzo Codeca'	(Italy) Mauro Toffoli	3
Toyota	Hilux Overdrive	Overdrive Racing	(Argentina) Juan Cruz Yacopini	(Spain) Daniel Oliveras	1–4
Toyota	Hilux Overdrive	Overdrive Racing	(Kyrgyzstan) Denis Krotov	(Israel) Konstantin Zhiltsov	2–3
Toyota	Hilux Overdrive	Overdrive Racing	(France) Ronan Chabot	(France) Gilles Pillot	2
Toyota	Hilux Overdrive	Overdrive Racing	(Saudi Arabia) Yazeed Al-Rajhi	(Germany) Timo Gottschalk	3–4
Toyota	Hilux Overdrive	Overdrive Racing	(Portugal) Francisco Barreto	(Portugal) Carlos Silva	3–4
Toyota	Hilux Overdrive	Overdrive Racing	(Brazil) Lucas Moraes	(Brazil) Kaique Bentivoglio	4
Toyota	Hilux Overdrive	Overdrive Racing	(Lithuania) Rokas Baciuška	(Spain) Oriol Vidal	4
Toyota	Hilux Overdrive	Nasser Racing	(Qatar) Nasser Al-Attiyah	(France) Mathieu Baumel	1
Toyota	GR DKR Hilux	Toyota Gazoo Racing	(Qatar) Nasser Al-Attiyah	(France) Mathieu Baumel	2–4
Toyota	Hilux	Finarto Racing	(Poland) Tomasz Baranowski	(Poland) Maciej Marton	3
Toyota	Hilux	Varga Racing Team ASE	(Hungary) Imre Varga	(Hungary) Jozsef Toma	3
Toyota	Hilux	Proxcars TME Rally Team	(Poland) Magdalena Zajac	(Poland) Jacek Czachor	3–4
Toyota	Hilux		(Portugal) Tiago Reis	(Portugal) Valter Cardoso	4
Toyota	Hilux		(France) Romain Dumas	(France) Max Delfino	4
T3 Teams & Drivers
Constructor	Car	Team	Driver	Co-driver	Roundsf
Bedu	Pro X3	Bedu Racing	(Hungary) Csaba Miklos	(Hungary) Albert Horn	3
Bedu	Pro X3	Bedu Racing	(Hungary) Miklos Trebitsch	(Hungary) Sandor Trebitsch	3
Can-Am	Maverick X3	Dark Horse	(Saudi Arabia) Saleh Alsaif	(Qatar) Nasser Al-Kuwari	1
Can-Am	Maverick X3		(Kuwait) Mshari Althefiri	(Spain) Oriol Vidal	3
Can-Am	Maverick X3	South Racing Can-Am	(Kuwait) Mshari Althefiri	(Spain) Oriol Vidal	1
Can-Am	Maverick X3	South Racing Can-Am	(Brazil) Otavio Sousa Leite	(Portugal) João Ferreira	1–4
Can-Am	Maverick X3	South Racing Can-Am	(Argentina) Fernando Álvarez	(France) Xavier Panseri	1–4
Can-Am	Maverick X3	South Racing Can-Am	(Argentina) Hector Diego Martínez	(Uruguay) Sergio Lafuente	1–2
Can-Am	Maverick X3	South Racing Can-Am	(Saudi Arabia) Dania Akeel	(France) Laurent Lichtleuchter	1–2
Can-Am	Maverick X3	South Racing Can-Am	(Saudi Arabia) Dania Akeel	(Germany) Calheine Perry	3–4
Can-Am	Maverick X3	South Racing Can-Am	(Netherlands) Anja Van Loon	(Netherlands) Floor Maten	3
Can-Am	Maverick X3	South Racing Can-Am	(Netherlands) Erik Van Loon	(France) Sébastien Delaunay	3
Can-Am	Maverick X3	South Racing Can-Am	(Netherlands) Erik Van Loon	(Netherlands) Hein Verschuuren	4
Can-Am	Maverick X3	South Racing Can-Am	(Portugal) João Monteiro	(Portugal) Nuno Morais	4
Can-Am	Maverick X3	FN Speed Team	(Spain) Santiago Navarro	(France) Adrien Metge	1
Can-Am	Maverick X3	FN Speed Team	(Spain) Santiago Navarro	(Spain) Pol Ros	3
Can-Am	Maverick X3	QMMF Team	(Qatar) Nasser Al-Kuwari	(France) François Cazalet	2
Can-Am	Maverick X3	QMMF Team	(Qatar) Abdulaziz Al-Kuwari	(United Arab Emirates) Alexei Kuzmich	2
Can-Am	Maverick X3	QMMF Team	(Qatar) Ahmad Al-Muhannadi	(Qatar) Mubarak Al-Khelaifi	2
Can-Am	Maverick X3	QMMF Team	(Qatar) Rashid Al-Muhannadi	(Poland) Szymon Gospodarczyk	2
Can-Am	Maverick X3	Sports Racing Technologies	(Lithuania) Egidijus Valeiša	(Lithuania) Mindaugas Varža	3–4
Can-Am	Maverick X3	Sports Racing Technologies	(Kuwait) Mshari Althefiri	(Germany) Dennis Zenz	4
Can-Am	Maverick X3	Marbet Lipsko Rally Team	(Poland) Piotr Otko	(Poland) Karolina Otko	3
Can-Am	Maverick X3		(Italy) Andrea Castagnera	(Italy) Alberto Marcon	3
Can-Am	Maverick X3		(Italy) Elvis Borsoi	(Italy) Stefano Pelloni	3
Can-Am	Maverick X3		(Italy) Federico Butto	(Italy) Elisa Tassile	3
Can-Am	Maverick X3	Santag Racing	(Portugal) João Dias	(Portugal) Pedro Re	4
Can-Am	Maverick X3	Santag Racing	(Portugal) Armindo Araujo	(Portugal) Luis Ramalho	4
Can-Am	Maverick X3	Santag Racing	(Portugal) Paulo Rodrigues	(Portugal) Miguel Salvador	4
Can-Am	Maverick X3		(France) Romain Locmane	(France) Jean-François Palissier	4
Can-Am	Maverick X3		(Portugal) Duarte Silva	(Portugal) Nuno Silva	4
Can-Am	Maverick X3	Classic Cars Andorra	(Andorra) Jordi Pons	(Spain) Jessica Nebra	4
Can-Am	Maverick X3		(Portugal) Paulo Casaca	(Portugal) João Serodio	4
Can-Am	Maverick X3		(Paraguay) Andrea Lafarja	(Argentina) Ricardo Torlaschi	4
G Rally Team	OT3	G Rally Team	(Netherlands) Kees Koolen	(Netherlands) Wouter Rosegaar	1–4
G Rally Team	OT3	G Rally Team	(France) Lionel Baud	(France) Lucie Baud	2
G Rally Team	OT3	G Rally Team	(Belgium) Guillaume De Mévius	(France) François Cazalet	4
G Rally Team	OT3	G Rally Team	(France) Claude Fournier	(Belgium) Andre Leyh	4
Herrator	HRX-3	C.A. Herrador Competición	(Spain) Roberto Rodríguez	(Spain) Herman Rodríguez	4
JMPR	T3	Escuderia JMP Racing	(Portugal) Rui Carneiro	(Portugal) Manuel Porem	4
JMPR	T3	Escuderia JMP Racing	(Spain) José Maria Naranjo	(Spain) José Antonio Alvarez	4
MCE-5	T3M		(Kuwait) Mshari Althefiri	(Spain) Oriol Vidal	2
MCE-5	T3M		(Brazil) Gunter Hinkelmann	(Brazil) Enio Bozzano	4
MMP	T3 Rally Raid		(France) Benjamin Favre	(France) Jean-Pierre Garcin	4
MMP	T3 Rally Raid		(France) Christophe Cresp	(France) Jean Brucy	4
MMP	T3 Rally Raid		(France) Jedidia Favre	(France) Thibaud Darroux	4
MMP	T3 Rally Raid		(France) Laurent Poletti	(France) Pascal Larroque	4
MMP	T3 Rally Raid		(France) Stephane Consani	(France) Thibault de la Haye	4
PH-Sport	Zephyr		(France) Jean-Luc Ceccaldi	(France) Laurent Magat	2
Taurus	T3 Max T3M	Sec. Esp. RACC Motor Sport	(Spain) Laia Sanz	(Italy) Maurizio Gerini	4
Taurus	T3 Max T3M	Wevers Sport	(United States) Mitch Guthrie	(United States) Kellon Walch	4
VM Competicion	Ordaz-R	Gedeser XXI	(Spain) Enrique Reyes	(Spain) Fina Román	4
Yamaha	X-Raid 1000R Turbo	X-Raid Yamaha Supported Team	(Spain) Miquel Prat	(Spain) Mario González	4
T4 Teams & Drivers
Constructor	Car	Team	Driver	Co-driver	Rounds
BRP Can-Am	Maverick XRS Turbo	South Racing Can-Am	(Brazil) Cristiano Batista	(Portugal) Fausto Mota	1–4
BRP Can-Am	Maverick XRS Turbo		(Spain) Ricardo Ramilo	Andrei Rudnitski	1, 3
BRP Can-Am	Maverick XRS Turbo		(Spain) Ricardo Ramilo	(Spain) Marc Solà	2
BRP Can-Am	Maverick XRS Turbo		(Spain) Ricardo Ramilo	(Argentina) Bruno Jacomy	4
BRP Can-Am	Maverick XRS Turbo	FN Speed Team	(Spain) Pau Navarro	(France) Michael Metge	1
BRP Can-Am	Maverick XRS Turbo	FN Speed Team	(Spain) Pau Navarro	(Portugal) Gonçalo Reis	2–4
BRP Can-Am	Maverick XRS Turbo	FN Speed Team	(Italy) Rebecca Busi	(Spain) Alba Sanchez	3–4
BRP Can-Am	Maverick XRS Turbo		(Italy) Stefano Marrini	(Italy) Silvio Valentini	2
BRP Can-Am	Maverick XRS Turbo		(Switzerland) Jérôme de Sadeleer	(France) Michael Metge	4
BRP Can-Am	Maverick XRS Turbo	Colegio Mayor Elías Ahuja	(Spain) Fidel Castillo	(Spain) Marc Solà	4
Polaris	Pro R		(France) Jeremie Warnia	(France) Loïc Minaudier	1–4
Polaris	Pro R		(Uruguay) Luis Henderson	(Germany) Juan Carlos Carignani	1
Polaris	Pro R		(Uruguay) Luis Henderson	(Argentina) Bruno Jacomy	2
Polaris	Pro R		(Italy) Michele Cinotto	(Italy) Maurizio Dominella	1
Polaris	Pro R		(Italy) Pietro Cinotto	(Italy) Maurizio Dominella	2
Polaris	Pro R		(Italy) Dario De Lorenzo	(Italy) Aldo De Lorenzo	3
Polaris	Pro R		(France) Jean-Luc Ceccaldi	(France) Sébastien Delaunay	4
Yamaha	YXZ 1000R	Quaddy Racing	(Italy) Amerigo Ventura	(Italy) Mirko Brun	3

== Results ==
=== Overall ===
Round	Rally name	Podium finishers			
Round	Rally name	Rank	Driver	Car	Time
1	(Saudi Arabia) Saudi Baja	1	(Qatar) Nasser Al-Attiyah (France) Mathieu Baumel	Toyota Hilux Overdrive	3:56:17
1	(Saudi Arabia) Saudi Baja	2	(Argentina) Juan Cruz Yacopini (Spain) Daniel Oliveras	Toyota Hilux Overdrive	4:15:19
1	(Saudi Arabia) Saudi Baja	3	(Poland) Krzysztof Hołowczyc (Poland) Łukasz Kurzeja	Mini John Cooper Works Plus	4:26:36
2	Qatar International Baja	1	(Qatar) Nasser Al-Attiyah (France) Mathieu Baumel	Toyota GR DKR Hilux	4:51:49
2	Qatar International Baja	2	(Kyrgyzstan) Denis Krotov (Israel) Konstantin Zhiltsov	Toyota Hilux Overdrive	5:08:11
2	Qatar International Baja	3	(China) Zhang Guoyu (Spain) Oriol Mena	BAIC ORV BJ40	5:11:00
3	(Italy) Italian Baja	1	(Saudi Arabia) Yazeed Al-Rajhi (Germany) Timo Gottschalk	Toyota Hilux Overdrive	4:41:12
3	(Italy) Italian Baja	2	(Qatar) Nasser Al-Attiyah (France) Mathieu Baumel	Toyota GR DKR Hilux	4:50:40
3	(Italy) Italian Baja	3	(Portugal) João Ferreira (Portugal) Filipe Palmeiro	Mini John Cooper Works Plus	4:53:51
4	(Spain) Baja España Aragón	1	(Qatar) Nasser Al-Attiyah (France) Mathieu Baumel	Toyota GR DKR Hilux	6:18:37
4	(Spain) Baja España Aragón	2	(Brazil) Lucas Moraes (Brazil) Kaique Bentivoglio	Toyota Hilux Overdrive	6:20:20
4	(Spain) Baja España Aragón	3	(Lithuania) Vaidotas Žala (Portugal) Paulo Fiuza	Mini John Cooper Works Plus	6:28:28
5	Baja Poland	1	(Poland) Krzysztof Hołowczyc (Poland) Lukasz Kurzeja	Mini John Cooper Works Plus	4:11:59
5	Baja Poland	2	(Poland) Michał Maluszynski (Poland) Julita Maluszynska	Mini John Cooper Works Plus	4:21:57
5	Baja Poland	3	(Poland) Wlodzimierz Grajek (Poland) Dominik Jazic	Toyota Hilux	4:35:53
6	(Portugal) Baja Portalegre 500	1	(Portugal) João Ferreira (Portugal) Filipe Palmeiro	Mini John Cooper Works Plus	4:54:16
6	(Portugal) Baja Portalegre 500	2	(Saudi Arabia) Yazeed Al-Rajhi (Germany) Timo Gottschalk	Toyota Hilux Overdrive	4:56:37
6	(Portugal) Baja Portalegre 500	3	(Qatar) Nasser Al-Attiyah (France) Mathieu Baumel	Prodrive Hunter T1+	4:58:42
7	Jordan Baja (Cancelled)	1			
7	Jordan Baja (Cancelled)	2			
7	Jordan Baja (Cancelled)	3			
8	(United Arab Emirates) Dubai International Baja	1	(Qatar) Nasser Al-Attiyah (France) Mathieu Baumel	Prodrive Hunter T1+	5:22:52
8	(United Arab Emirates) Dubai International Baja	2	(Saudi Arabia) Yazeed Al-Rajhi (Germany) Timo Gottschalk	Toyota Hilux Overdrive	5:28:06
8	(United Arab Emirates) Dubai International Baja	3	(Argentina) Juan Cruz Yacopini (Spain) Daniel Oliveras	Toyota Hilux Overdrive	5:48:35

=== T3 ===
Round	Rally name	Podium finishers			
Round	Rally name	Rank	Driver	Car	Time
1	(Saudi Arabia) Saudi Baja	1	(Saudi Arabia) Saleh Alsaif (Qatar) Nasser Al-Kuwari	Can-Am Maverick	4:33:28
1	(Saudi Arabia) Saudi Baja	2	(Argentina) Fernando Álvarez (France) Xavier Panseri	Can-Am Maverick	4:39:59
1	(Saudi Arabia) Saudi Baja	3	(Saudi Arabia) Dania Akeel (France) Laurent Lichtleuchter	Can-Am Maverick	4:42:49
2	Qatar International Baja	1	(Kuwait) Mshari Althefiri (Spain) Oriol Vidal	MCE-5 T3M	5:30:32
2	Qatar International Baja	2	(Qatar) Abdulaziz Al-Kuwari (United Arab Emirates) Alexei Kuzmich	Can-Am Maverick	5:38:05
2	Qatar International Baja	3	(Qatar) Nasser Al-Kuwari (France) François Cazalet	Can-Am Maverick	5:44:23
3	(Italy) Italian Baja	1	(Brazil) Otavio Sousa Leite (Portugal) João Ferreira	Can-Am Maverick	5:08:46
3	(Italy) Italian Baja	2	(Lithuania) Egidijus Valeiša (Lithuania) Mindaugas Varža	Can-Am Maverick X3	5:10:24
3	(Italy) Italian Baja	3	(Kuwait) Mshari Althefiri (Spain) Oriol Vidal	Can-Am Maverick	5:24:55
4	(Spain) Baja España Aragón	1	(Belgium) Guillaume De Mévius (France) François Cazalet	G Rally Team OT3	6:39:30
4	(Spain) Baja España Aragón	2	(Portugal) João Dias (Portugal) Pedro Re	Can-Am Maverick X3	6:43:39
4	(Spain) Baja España Aragón	3	(Portugal) João Monteiro (Portugal) Nuno Morais	Can-Am Maverick	6:52:18
5	Baja Poland	1	(Kuwait) Mshari Althefiri (Spain) Oriol Vidal	Can-Am Maverick X3	4:34:23
5	Baja Poland	2	(Brazil) Otavio Sousa Leite (Portugal) João Ferreira	Can-Am Maverick	4:44:43
5	Baja Poland	3	(Saudi Arabia) Dania Akeel (Germany) Calheine Perry	Can-Am Maverick	5:13:07
6	(Portugal) Baja Portalegre 500	1	(Portugal) João Dias (Portugal) Joao Miranda	Can-Am Maverick X3	4:56:55
6	(Portugal) Baja Portalegre 500	2	(Portugal) Armindo Araujo (Portugal) Luis Ramalho	Can-Am Maverick X3	4:57:29
6	(Portugal) Baja Portalegre 500	3	(Sweden) Adam Thomelius (Sweden) Oscar Andersson	Can-Am Maverick	5:00:30
7	Jordan Baja (Cancelled)	1			
7	Jordan Baja (Cancelled)	2			
7	Jordan Baja (Cancelled)	3			
8	(United Arab Emirates) Dubai International Baja	1	(Brazil) Otavio Sousa Leite (Portugal) João Ferreira	Can-Am Maverick	6:04:05
8	(United Arab Emirates) Dubai International Baja	2	(Brazil) Cristiano Batista (Portugal) Fausto Mota	Can-Am Maverick	6:09:34
8	(United Arab Emirates) Dubai International Baja	3	(Saudi Arabia) Dania Akeel (Germany) Calheine Perry	Can-Am Maverick	6:30:50

=== T4 ===
Round	Rally name	Podium finishers			
Round	Rally name	Rank	Driver	Car	Time
1	(Saudi Arabia) Saudi Baja	1	(Spain) Pau Navarro (France) Michael Metge	BRP Can-Am Maverick XRS Turbo	4:42:35
1	(Saudi Arabia) Saudi Baja	2	(France) Jeremie Warnia (France) Loïc Minaudier	Polaris Pro R	4:43:32
1	(Saudi Arabia) Saudi Baja	3	(Italy) Michele Cinotto (Italy) Maurizio Dominella	Polaris Pro R	4:54:53
2	Qatar International Baja	1	(France) Jeremie Warnia (France) Loïc Minaudier	Polaris Pro R	5:45:51
2	Qatar International Baja	2	(Brazil) Cristiano Batista (Portugal) Fausto Mota	BRP Can-Am Maverick XRS Turbo	5:46:21
2	Qatar International Baja	3	(Spain) Pau Navarro (Portugal) Gonçalo Reis	BRP Can-Am Maverick XRS Turbo	6:02:01
3	(Italy) Italian Baja	1	(Brazil) Cristiano Batista (Portugal) Fausto Mota	BRP Can-Am Maverick XRS Turbo	5:08:38
3	(Italy) Italian Baja	2	(Italy) Amerigo Ventura (Italy) Mirko Brun	Yamaha YXZ 1000R	5:09:43
3	(Italy) Italian Baja	3	(Italy) Dario De Lorenzo (Italy) Aldo De Lorenzo	Polaris RZR Pro R	6:10:27
4	(Spain) Baja España Aragón	1	(Brazil) Cristiano Batista (Portugal) Fausto Mota	BRP Can-Am Maverick XRS Turbo	7:02:08
4	(Spain) Baja España Aragón	2	(Spain) Pau Navarro (Portugal) Gonçalo Reis	BRP Can-Am Maverick XRS Turbo	7:08:40
4	(Spain) Baja España Aragón	3	(Spain) Eduard Pons (Spain) Jaume Betriu	BRP Can-Am Maverick XRS Turbo	7:13:58
5	Baja Poland	1	(Brazil) Cristiano Batista (Portugal) Fausto Mota	BRP Can-Am Maverick XRS Turbo	4:46:52
5	Baja Poland	2	(France) Jeremie Warnia (France) Loïc Minaudier	Polaris Pro R	4:55:27
5	Baja Poland	3	(Spain) Ricardo Ramilo (Ukraine) Dmytro Tsyro	Can-Am Maverick X3	5:03:46
6	(Portugal) Baja Portalegre 500	1	(Brazil) Cristiano Batista (Brazil) Robledo Nicoletti	BRP Can-Am Maverick XRS Turbo	5:07:36
6	(Portugal) Baja Portalegre 500	2	(Spain) Alexander Toril Boquol (Spain) Pedro Lopez Chavez	BRP Can-Am Maverick XRS Turbo	5:24:59
6	(Portugal) Baja Portalegre 500	3	(France) Sean Haran (France) Martin Hales	Polaris RZR Pro R	5:47:35
7	Jordan Baja (Cancelled)	1			
7	Jordan Baja (Cancelled)	2			
7	Jordan Baja (Cancelled)	3			
8	(United Arab Emirates) Dubai International Baja	1	(Portugal) João Ferreira (Portugal) Filipe Palmeiro	BRP Can-Am Maverick XRS Turbo	5:48:48
8	(United Arab Emirates) Dubai International Baja	2	(Italy) Amerigo Ventura (Italy) Mirko Brun	Yamaha YXZ 1000R	6:25:42
8	(United Arab Emirates) Dubai International Baja	3	(United Arab Emirates) Atif Alzarouni (United Arab Emirates) Patrick McMurren	Yamaha YXZ 1000R	7:06:46

== Championship standings ==
Points system

- Points for final positions are awarded as per the following table:

Position	1st	2nd	3rd	4th	5th	6th	7th	8th	9th	10th	11th	12th	13th	14th	15th
Overall points	30	25	20	17	15	13	10	9	8	7	6	5	4	3	2
Leg Points	5	4	3	2	1	0									

For the 2023 season points will be awarded to the top five finishing positions of each leg on each event. These points will only be awarded if the driver finishes in the overall classification of each event. If they do not then no leg points are awarded, but the following vehicles will not move up a position for leg points.

=== FIA World Cup for Drivers, Co-Drivers, and Teams ===
==== Drivers' & Co-Drivers' championships ====
Pos	Driver	SAU (Saudi Arabia)	QAT (Qatar)	ITA (Italy)	ESP (Spain)	POL (Poland)	POR (Portugal)	DUB (United Arab Emirates)	Points
1	(Qatar) Nasser Al-Attiyah	1^{40}	1^{40}	2^{29}	1^{39}		5	1^{39}	187
2	(Saudi Arabia) Yazeed Al-Rajhi			1^{40}	8^{13}		2^{29}	2^{33}	115
3	(Portugal) João Ferreira			3^{26}	4^{20}		1^{37}	4^{21}	104
4	(Argentina) Juan Cruz Yacopini	2^{32}	4^{19}	4^{23}	13^{4}			3^{20}	98
5	(Poland) Krzysztof Hołowczyc	3^{24}	Ret	Ret	7^{11}	1^{40}			75
6	(Brazil) Otavio Sousa Leite	10^{7}	11^{6}	6^{15}	Ret	5^{18}		5^{16}	62
7	(Brazil) Cristiano Batista	NC	9^{8}	5^{16}	24	6^{16}	9^{8}	7^{13}	61
8	(Kuwait) Mshari Althefiri	Ret	5^{15}	11^{6}	23	3^{24}	11^{6}		51
9	(Poland) Michał Maluszynski			9^{8}		2^{33}			41
10	(Saudi Arabia) Dania Akeel	7^{11}	24	12^{5}	39	9^{8}	15^{2}	9^{8}	34
11	(Brazil) Lucas Moraes				2^{33}				33
12	(Kyrgyzstan) Denis Krotov		2^{31}	EXL					31
13	(Argentina) Fernando Álvarez	5^{16}	12^{5}	26	22	10^{7}			28
=	(France) Jeremie Warnia	9^{8}	8^{9}	23	66	7^{11}			28
15	(China) Zhang Guoyu		3^{27}						27
16	(Portugal) João Dias				14^{3}		3^{23}		26
17	(France) Ronan Chabot		10^{10}					6^{13}	23
18	(Lithuania) Vaidotas Žala				3^{22}				22
19	(Portugal) Armindo Araujo						4^{20}		20
=	(Italy) Amerigo Ventura			7^{11}				8^{9}	20
21	(Saudi Arabia) Saleh Alsaif	4^{19}							19
=	(Poland) Wlodzimierz Grajek					4^{19}			19
23	(Spain) Pau Navarro	6^{13}	13^{4}	Ret	26				17
=	(Sweden) Adam Thomelius						6^{17}		17
25	(Portugal) Tiago Reis				5^{16}				16
=	(Netherlands) Kees Koolen	8^{12}	18	13^{4}	32				16
28	(Spain) Nani Roma				6^{14}				14
=	(Sweden) Mattias Ekström						8^{14}		14
30	(Qatar) Abdulaziz Al-Kuwari		6^{13}						13
=	(Qatar) Nasser Al-Kuwari		7^{13}						13
32	(Portugal) Miguel Barbosa						7^{11}		11
33	(Lithuania) Egidijus Valeiša			8^{9}	Ret				9
=	(United States) Seth Quintero							12^{9}	9
35	(Lithuania) Rokas Baciuška				9^{8}				8
=	(Spain) Santiago Navarro	11^{8}		Ret					8
37	(Portugal) Francisco Barreto			Ret	10^{7}				7
=	(Portugal) Pedro Carvalho						10^{7}		7
=	(Paraguay) Andrea Lafarja Bittar							10^{7}	7
=	(Czech Republic) Miroslav Zapletal			10^{7}					7
41	(South Africa) Gareth Woolridge				11^{6}				6
	(Spain) Ricardo Ramilo	13^{4}	15^{2}	24	35				6
	(Italy) Michele Cinotto	12^{5}							5
34	(Belgium) Guillaume De Mévius				12^{5}				5
35	(France) Lionel Baud		14^{3}						3
37	(Poland) Piotr Otko			14^{3}					3
38	(Argentina) Sebastian Halpern				15^{2}				2
39	(Hungary) Csaba Miklos			15^{2}					2
40	(France) Romain Dumas				27^{2}				2
	(Italy) Stefano Marrini		16						0
	(Poland) Tomasz Baranowski			16					0
	(Qatar) Rashid Al-Muhannadi		17						0
	(Italy) Andrea Castagnera			17					0
	(Hungary) Imre Varga			18					0
	(Poland) Magdalena Zajac			19	Ret				0
	(China) Zi Yunliang		19						0
	(Portugal) João Monteiro				19				0
	(Uruguay) Luis Henderson	NC	20						0
	(Netherlands) Anja Van Loon			20					0
	(Argentina) Hector Diego Martínez	NC	21						0
	(Italy) Dario De Lorenzo			21					0
	(Portugal) Armindo Araujo				21				0
	(Italy) Pietro Cinotto		22						0
	(Hungary) Miklos Trebitsch			22					0
	(Qatar) Ahmad Al-Muhannadi		23						0
	(Netherlands) Erik Van Loon			25	25				0
	(France) Jean-Luc Ceccaldi		25		70				0
	(Saudi Arabia) Majed Al-Thunayyan		26						0
	(Italy) Alfio Bordonaro			27					0
	(Spain) Laia Sanz				28				0
	(Portugal) Paulo Rodrigues				33				0
	(France) Benjamin Favre				37				0
	(France) Christophe Cresp				40				0
	(France) Jedidia Favre				41				0
	(France) Romain Locmane				42				0
	(Portugal) Duarte Silva				45				0
	(France) Claude Fournier				47				0
	(Italy) Rebecca Busi			Ret	54				0
	(Spain) Enrique Reyes				59				0
	(Spain) Miquel Prat				62				0
	(Portugal) Rui Carneiro				63				0
	(United States) Mitch Guthrie				65				0
	(Spain) Roberto Rodríguez				67				0
	(Andorra) Jordi Pons				72				0
	(Italy) Stefano Moro		Ret						0
	(San Marino) Lorenzo Codeca			Ret					0
	(Czech Republic) František Brutovský			Ret					0
	(Italy) Elvis Borsoi			Ret					0
	(Italy) Federico Butto			Ret					0
	(Switzerland) Jérôme de Sadeleer				Ret				0
	(Spain) Fidel Castillo				Ret				0
	(France) Laurent Poletti				Ret				0
	(Portugal) Paulo Casaca				Ret				0
	(Spain) José Maria Naranjo				Ret				0
	(Brazil) Gunter Hinkelmann				Ret				0
	(France) Stephane Consani				Ret				0
	(Paraguay) Andrea Lafarja				Ret				0
Pos	Driver	SAU (Saudi Arabia)	QAT (Qatar)	ITA (Italy)	ESP (Spain)	POL (Poland)	POR (Portugal)	DUB (United Arab Emirates)	Points

Pos	Co-Driver	SAU (Saudi Arabia)	QAT (Qatar)	ITA (Italy)	ESP (Spain)	POL (Poland)	POR (Portugal)	JOR (Jordan)	DUB (United Arab Emirates)	Points
1	(France) Mathieu Baumel	1^{40}	1^{40}	2^{29}	1^{39}					148
2	(Spain) Daniel Oliveras	2^{32}	4^{19}	4^{23}	13^{4}					78
3	(Germany) Timo Gottschalk			1^{40}	8^{13}					53
4	(Portugal) Filipe Palmeiro			3^{26}	4^{20}					46
5	(Poland) Lukasz Kurzeja	3^{24}	Ret	Ret	7^{11}					35
6	(Brazil) Kaique Bentivoglio				2^{33}					33
7	(Israel) Konstantin Zhiltsov		2^{31}	EXL						31
8	(Spain) Oriol Vidal	Ret	5^{15}	11^{6}	9^{8}					29
9	(Portugal) João Ferreira	10^{7}	11^{6}	6^{15}	Ret					28
10	(Spain) Oriol Mena		3^{27}							27
11	(Portugal) Fausto Mota	NC	9^{8}	5^{16}	24					24
12	(Portugal) Paulo Fiuza				3^{22}					22
13	(France) Xavier Panseri	5^{16}	12^{5}	26	22					21
14	(Qatar) Nasser Al-Kuwari	4^{19}								19
15	(France) François Cazalet		7^{13}		12^{5}					18
16	(France) Loïc Minaudier	9^{8}	8^{9}	23	66					17
17	(Portugal) Valter Cardoso				5^{16}					16
18	(Netherlands) Wouter Rosegaar	8^{12}	18	13^{4}	32					16
19	(Spain) Alex Haro				6^{14}					14
20	(United Arab Emirates) Alexei Kuzmich		6^{13}							13
21	(France) Michael Metge	6^{13}			Ret					13
22	(Italy) Mirko Brun			7^{11}						11
23	(France) Laurent Lichtleuchter	7^{11}	24							11
24	(France) Gilles Pillot		10^{10}							10
25	(Lithuania) Mindaugas Varža			8^{9}	Ret					9
26	(Poland) Szymon Gospodarczyk		17	9^{8}						8
27	(France) Adrien Metge	11^{8}								8
28	(Portugal) Carlos Silva			Ret	10^{7}					7
29	(Slovakia) Marek Sykora			10^{7}						7
30	(South Africa) Boyd Dreyer				11^{6}					6
31	(Italy) Maurizio Dominella	12^{5}	22							5
32	(Germany) Calheine Perry			12^{5}	39					5
33	(Portugal) Gonçalo Reis		13^{4}	Ret	26					4
34	Andrei Rudnitski	13^{4}		24						4
35	(France) Lucie Baud		14^{3}							3
36	(Poland) Karolina Otko			14^{3}						3
37	(Portugal) Pedro Re				14^{3}					3
38	(Argentina) Bernardo Graue				15^{2}					2
39	(Hungary) Albert Horn			15^{2}						2
40	(Spain) Marc Solà		15^{2}		Ret					2
41	(France) Max Delfino				27^{2}					2
	(Italy) Silvio Valentini		16							0
	(Poland) Maciej Marton			16						0
	(Italy) Alberto Marcon			17						0
	(Hungary) Jozsef Toma			18						0
	(Poland) Jacek Czachor			19	Ret					0
	(China) Sha He		19							0
	(Portugal) Nuno Morais				19					0
	(Argentina) Bruno Jacomy		20		35					0
	(Netherlands) Floor Maten			20						0
	(Uruguay) Sergio Lafuente	NC	21							0
	(Italy) Aldo De Lorenzo			21						0
	(Portugal) Luis Ramalho				21					0
	(Hungary) Sandor Trebitsch			22						0
	(Qatar) Mubarak Al-Khelaifi		23							0
	(Germany) Dennis Zenz				23					0
	(France) Laurent Magat		25							0
	(France) Sébastien Delaunay			25	70					0
	(Netherlands) Hein Verschuuren				25					0
	(Saudi Arabia) Fahad Al-Sufyani		26							0
	(Italy) Stefano Lovisa			27						0
	(Italy) Maurizio Gerini				28					0
	(Portugal) Miguel Salvador				33					0
	(France) Jean-Pierre Garcin				37					0
	(France) Jean Brucy				40					0
	(France) Thibaud Darroux				41					0
	(France) Jean-François Palissier				42					0
	(Portugal) Nuno Silva				45					0
	(Belgium) Andre Leyh				47					0
	(Spain) Alba Sanchez			Ret	54					0
	(Spain) Fina Román				59					0
	(Spain) Mario González				62					0
	(Portugal) Manuel Porem				63					0
	(United States) Kellon Walch				65					0
	(Spain) Herman Rodríguez				67					0
	(Spain) Jessica Nebra				72					0
	(Germany) Juan Carlos Carignani	NC								0
	(Italy) Francesco Proietti		Ret							0
	(Spain) Pol Ros			Ret						0
	(Italy) Mauro Toffoli			Ret						0
	(Czech Republic) Petr Hauptmann			Ret						0
	(Italy) Stefano Pelloni			Ret						0
	(Italy) Elisa Tassile			Ret						0
	(France) Pascal Larroque				Ret					0
	(Portugal) João Serodio				Ret					0
	(Spain) José Antonio Alvarez				Ret					0
	(Brazil) Enio Bozzano				Ret					0
	(France) Thibault de la Haye				Ret					0
	(Argentina) Ricardo Torlaschi				Ret					0
Pos	Co-Driver	SAU (Saudi Arabia)	QAT (Qatar)	ITA (Italy)	ESP (Spain)	POL (Poland)	POR (Portugal)	JOR (Jordan)	DUB (United Arab Emirates)	Points

==== Teams championship ====
Pos	Team	SAU (Saudi Arabia)	QAT (Qatar)	ITA (Italy)	ESP (Spain)	POL (Poland)	POR (Portugal)	JOR (Jordan)	DUB (United Arab Emirates)	Points
1	Overdrive Racing	30	55	50	47					182
2	South Racing Can-Am	31	37	30	24					122
3	X-Raid Mini JCW Team	25	0	40	45					110
4	G Rally Team	15	13	11	22					61
5	FN Speed Team	30	15	0	14					59
6	Sports Racing Technologies			0	9					9
Pos	Team	SAU (Saudi Arabia)	QAT (Qatar)	ITA (Italy)	ESP (Spain)	POL (Poland)	POR (Portugal)	JOR (Jordan)	DUB (United Arab Emirates)	Points

=== FIA T3 World Cup for Drivers ===
==== Drivers' championship ====
Pos	Driver	SAU (Saudi Arabia)	QAT (Qatar)	ITA (Italy)	ESP (Spain)	POL (Poland)	POR (Portugal)	JOR (Jordan)	DUB (United Arab Emirates)	Points
1	(Kuwait) Mshari Althefiri	Ret	1^{39}	3^{23}	6^{15}					77
2	(Brazil) Otavio Sousa Leite	5^{17}	4^{18}	1^{40}	Ret					75
3	(Argentina) Fernando Álvarez	2^{30}	5^{18}	12^{5}	5^{15}					68
4	(Saudi Arabia) Dania Akeel	3^{25}	11^{8}	4^{21}	12^{5}					59
5	(Netherlands) Kees Koolen	4^{22}	8^{11}	5^{18}	9^{8}					59
6	(Belgium) Guillaume De Mévius				1^{40}					40
7	(Saudi Arabia) Saleh Alsaif	1^{38}								38
8	(Portugal) João Dias				2^{33}					33
9	(Lithuania) Egidijus Valeiša			2^{33}	Ret					33
10	(Qatar) Abdulaziz Al-Kuwari		2^{32}							32
11	(Qatar) Nasser Al-Kuwari		3^{25}							25
12	(Portugal) João Monteiro				3^{24}					33
13	(Portugal) Armindo Araujo				4^{19}					19
14	(Argentina) Hector Diego Martínez	7^{11}	9^{8}							19
15	(Spain) Santiago Navarro	6^{18}		Ret						18
16	(Netherlands) Erik Van Loon			11^{6}	7^{11}					17
17	(France) Lionel Baud		6^{14}							14
18	(Poland) Piotr Otko			6^{14}						14
19	(Hungary) Csaba Miklos			7^{12}						12
20	(Qatar) Rashid Al-Muhannadi		7^{11}							11
21	(Italy) Andrea Castagnera			8^{9}						9
22	(Spain) Laia Sanz				8^{9}					9
23	(Netherlands) Anja Van Loon			9^{8}						8
24	(Qatar) Ahmad Al-Muhannadi		10^{7}							7
25	(Portugal) Paulo Rodrigues				10^{7}					7
26	(Hungary) Miklos Trebitsch			10^{7}						7
27	(France) Benjamin Favre				11^{6}					6
28	(France) Jean-Luc Ceccaldi		12^{5}							5
29	(France) Christophe Cresp				13^{4}					4
30	(France) Jedidia Favre				14^{3}					3
31	(United States) Mitch Guthrie				21^{3}					3
32	(France) Romain Locmane				15^{2}					2
	(Portugal) Duarte Silva				16					0
	(France) Claude Fournier				17					0
	(Spain) Enrique Reyes				18					0
	(Spain) Miquel Prat				19					0
	(Portugal) Rui Carneiro				20					0
	(Spain) Roberto Rodríguez				22					0
	(Andorra) Jordi Pons				23					0
	(Italy) Elvis Borsoi			Ret						0
	(Italy) Federico Butto			Ret						0
	(France) Laurent Poletti				Ret					0
	(Portugal) Paulo Casaca				Ret					0
	(Spain) José Maria Naranjo				Ret					0
	(Brazil) Gunter Hinkelmann				Ret					0
	(France) Stephane Consani				Ret					0
	(Paraguay) Andrea Lafarja				Ret					0
Pos	Driver	SAU (Saudi Arabia)	QAT (Qatar)	ITA (Italy)	ESP (Spain)	POL (Poland)	POR (Portugal)	JOR (Jordan)	DUB (United Arab Emirates)	Points

=== FIA T4 World Cup for Drivers and Teams ===
==== Drivers' championship ====
Pos	Driver	SAU (Saudi Arabia)	QAT (Qatar)	ITA (Italy)	ESP (Spain)	POL (Poland)	POR (Portugal)	JOR (Jordan)	DUB (United Arab Emirates)	Points
1	(France) Jeremie Warnia	2^{32}	1^{38}							70
2	(Spain) Pau Navarro	1^{38}	3^{25}							63
3	(Brazil) Cristiano Batista	6^{18}	2^{33}							51
4	(Spain) Ricardo Ramilo	4^{22}	4^{19}							41
5	(Uruguay) Luis Henderson	5^{16}	6^{16}							32
6	(Italy) Michele Cinotto	3^{24}								24
7	(Italy) Stefano Marrini		5^{17}							17
8	(Italy) Pietro Cinotto		7^{13}							13
Pos	Driver	SAU (Saudi Arabia)	QAT (Qatar)	ITA (Italy)	ESP (Spain)	POL (Poland)	POR (Portugal)	JOR (Jordan)	DUB (United Arab Emirates)	Points

==== Teams championship ====
Pos	Team	SAU (Saudi Arabia)	QAT (Qatar)	ITA (Italy)	ESP (Spain)	POL (Poland)	POR (Portugal)	JOR (Jordan)	DUB (United Arab Emirates)	Points
1	FN Speed Team	30	25							55
2	South Racing Can-Am	25	30							55
Pos	Team	SAU (Saudi Arabia)	QAT (Qatar)	ITA (Italy)	ESP (Spain)	POL (Poland)	POR (Portugal)	JOR (Jordan)	DUB (United Arab Emirates)	Points
