= Agustín Layola =

Spanish footballer

Personal information
- Full name: Agustín Layola Riera
- Birth name: Agustí Layola i Riera
- Date of birth: 30 July 1907
- Place of birth: L'Hospitalet de Llobregat, Catalonia, Spain
- Date of death: 11 November 1998 (aged 91)
- Place of death: L'Hospitalet de Llobregat, Catalonia, Spain
- Position: Midfielder

Senior career*
Years	Team	Apps	(Gls)
1925–1926	SC Hospitalenc		
1926–1928	Gràcia FC		
1928–1931	CE Europa	48	(4)
1931–1934	Espanyol	23	(0)
1934–1936	Terrassa		
1936–1938	CE Europa		
1939–1941	UD Sant Martí		
1941–1942	Gimnàstic de Tarragona		

International career
1929–1935	Catalonia	5	(0)
- * Club domestic league appearances and goals

Agustín Layola Riera (30 July 1907 – 11 November 1998) was a Spanish footballer who played as a midfielder for CE Europa and Espanyol in the 1930s.

== Playing career ==
=== Club career ===
Born on 30 July 1907 in L'Hospitalet de Llobregat, Layola began his football career at his hometown club SC Hospitalenc in 1925, aged 18, and later at Gràcia FC, where he played two seasons, from 1926 until 1928, the year in which he began a streak of six consecutive seasons in the top division, three each with CE Europa (1928–31) and Espanyol (1931–34), scoring four goals in 71 La Liga matches, including four goals in 67 official matches for Europa, and one goal in 56 official matches for Espanyol. In the late 1920s, Layola played several matches for Europa in Sweden, Denmark, Poland, Czechoslovakia, and the Baltic countries.

In 1934, Layola joined Terrassa, but his career there was interrupted by the outbreak of the Spanish Civil War, during which he returned to Europa. On 2 January 1938, Layola scored against Sabadell to help Europa to a 6–1 win in a Catalan championship match. Once the War was over, he played for UD Sant Martí and then Gimnàstic de Tarragona from 1940 to 1942.

=== International career ===
Like so many other players from Europa and Espanyol, Layola was eligible to play for the Catalan national team, making his debut on 12 May 1929, against FC Barcelona at Les Corts, in a tribute match to Luis Bru that ended in a 1–2 loss. In the following month, on 30 June, he earned his second cap for Catalonia in a very similar circumstances, a tribute match against Barça, this time ending in a goalless draw.

Layola had to wait four years until his next match with Catalonia on 2 April 1933, a friendly against Atlético Madrid in benift of Barcelona hospitals, and even though he had to be replaced by Victoriano de Santos, Catalonia won 2–0 win. A few months later, on 20 August, he played against his future club Martinenc a tribute match to Carlos Altés in Sant Martí, helping his side to a 5–3 win, and he then played his last match for Catalonia on 1 January 1935, against his former club Espanyol, in a tribute match to Josep Pausàs, which ended in a 3–3 draw.

== Death ==
Layola died in L'Hospitalet de Llobregat on 11 November 1998, at the age of 91.
