= Victoriano de Santos =

Spanish footballer and manager

Personal information
- Full name: Victoriano de Santos Troya
- Date of birth: 18 January 1915
- Place of birth: Madrid, Spain
- Date of death: 25 July 2001 (aged 86)
- Place of death: Madrid, Spain
- Position: Midfielder

Senior career*
Years	Team	Apps	(Gls)
- Nacional de Madrid
- Sociedad Gimnástica
1928–1933	Atlético Madrid	61	(0)
1933–1934	Barcelona		
1934–1936	Valencia		
1939–1940	Granada		

International career
1933	Catalonia	1	(0)

Managerial career
- 1940–1941: Granada
- 1941–1942: Sevilla
- * Club domestic league appearances and goals

Victoriano de Santos Troya (5 May 1906 – 26 February 1943) was a Spanish footballer who played as a midfielder for Atlético Madrid, Barcelona, and Valencia in the 1930s. In doing so, he became the first footballer to play for Atlético, Barça, and Valencia.

After retiring, he worked as a manager, taking over the likes of Granada and Sevilla in the early 1940s.

== Playing career ==
=== Club career ===
Born on 5 May 1906 in Madrid, (Note: Some sources wrongly claim that he was born in La Torre de Esteban Hambrán, Toledo.) Santos began his football career at his hometown clubs Nacional de Madrid and Sociedad Gimnástica, from which he joined Atlético Madrid in 1928. In the following year, on 10 February 1929, he went down in history as one of the eleven footballers who played in Atlético's first-ever La Liga match, helping his side to a 3–2 win over Arenas de Getxo, thus becoming the first team to win away from home. In Atlético, he formed a memorable midfield with Arcadio Arteaga and Eduardo Ordóñez, which became known as the "three musketeers". In 1930, he was unable to prevent Atlético from being relegated to the Segunda División, but he remained at the club for another three seasons, until 1933. In total, he scored two goals in 113 official matches for Atlético.

Santos then played one season at both Barça (1933–34) and Valencia (1934–35). At the former, he was a regular under Austrian coach Jack Domby, starting every La Liga game that season despite Barça being packed with international players at the time. In total, he played 33 official matches for Barça. At Valencia, he played 14 La Liga matches under coach Anton Fibver, but he lost prominence in his second season, as he only played friendlies and Superregional matches. He was noted for his good technique and vision, being a solid defensive player and a reliable passer.

When the Spanish Civil War ended in 1939, the 33-year-old Santos was convinced by Manuel Valderrama, the then coach of Granada, to play for his club, doing so for one season as he then retired in 1940, at the age of 34.

=== International career ===
Like so many other Barça players, Santos was eligible to play for the Catalan national team, earning his first (and only) international cap on 2 April 1933, in a friendly match in aid of Barcelona hospitals, coming off the bench to replace Agustín Layola in an eventual 2–0 win over his former club Atlético Madrid. A few weeks earlier, on 28 February 1933, he had been the subject of a tribute match, which pitted Atlético against the Spain national team.

== Managerial career ==
After his career as a player ended, Santos remained linked to Granada, now as a coach, which he oversaw in the 1940–41 season, after which he took over Sevilla for the 1941–42 season, but he did not complete it because he fell seriously ill, being replaced by Pepe Brand with only two matches remaining and the team in sixth place.

== Death ==
Santos died on 26 February 1943, at the age of 36, a victim of stomach cancer. Following his death, Sevilla organized a charity match in his honor, with his family receiving the ticket proceeds, while Granada had its players wear a black ribbon in his memory during a match against Real Oviedo.

== Honours ==
=== As a manager ===
Granada

- Segunda División:
  - Champions (1): 1940–41

== See also ==
- List of Segunda División winning managers
