= José Luis Conde =

Spanish footballer (1911–1992)

Personal information
- Full name: José Luis Conde Cárdenas
- Date of birth: 4 April 1911
- Place of birth: San Sebastián, Spain
- Date of death: 18 January 1992 (aged 80)
- Position: Defender

Senior career*
Years	Team	Apps	(Gls)
1928–1932	Atlético Madrid	16	(0)
1942–1944	Sabadell	6	(0)

Managerial career
- 1951–1952: Cartagena
- 1952–1953: Real Zaragoza
- * Club domestic league appearances and goals

José Luis Conde Cárdenas (4 April 1911 – 18 January 1992) was a Spanish footballer who played as a Defender for Atlético Madrid and Sabadell.

After retiring, he became a manager, taking over Cartagena and Real Zaragoza in the early 1950s.

== Playing career ==
Conde was born in the Gipuzkoan town of San Sebastián on 4 April 1911, but when he was still a child, his family moved to Madrid, where he began his career at Atlético Madrid in late 1928, at the age of 17. Together with Ricardo Zulueta, Cosme Vázquez, and the Olaso brothers (Alfonso and Luis), he was a member of the Atlético team that played in the inaugural La Liga season in 1929, making his official debut as a colchonero on 2 June 1929 in a league fixture against Racing de Santander, which ended in a 2–1 victory. The following season, he played more matches as his team was relegated to the Segunda División. He stayed at Atlético for a further two seasons, until 1932, failing to achieve promotion on both occasions; in total, he played 17 official matches for the club, including 11 in the Spanish top flight, and never managed to score a single goal.

A decade and a Spanish Civil War later, in 1942, Conde returned to the playing field as a member of Sabadell, whose coach José Luis Zabala started him for the first time on 22 November 1942 against Osasuna, upon decided to change the defensive line that had been playing lately. Conde helped his side to a 3–1 win, and although he only played six matches that season, he helped the club win four of them, thus contributing to Sabedell's first-ever promotion to the first division. However, he was never able to make his top-flight debut with Sabedell because of the arrival of Vicenç Martínez on loan from Barcelona, who started instead of Conde. He failed to earn the confidence of either Kinké or Pedro Solé, so he only played a few friendly matches for the club in 1943, and a last one on 31 October.

== Managerial career ==
After retiring, Conde became a manager, taking charge over Cartagena and Real Zaragoza in the early 1950s, and on both occasions, his team was relegated. For the latter, he only coached nine La Liga matches between the transition of Elemér Berkessy and Domingo Balmanya.

== Death ==
Conde died on 18 January 1992, at the age of 80.

== Honours ==
Sabadell

- Segunda División
  - Champions (1): 1942–43
