= Mashael AlObaidan =

Saudi rally raid driver and powerboat racer

Personal information
- Native name: مشاعل العبيدان
- Nationality: Saudi Arabian
- Born: 1987 or 1988

Sport
- Sport: Rally raid, powerboat racing

Mashael AlObaidan (also spelled Alobaidan or Al-Obaidan; Arabic: مشاعل العبيدان; born 1987 or 1988) is a Saudi Arabian rally raid driver and powerboat racer. She was the first Saudi woman to receive a rally licence and, with Dania Akeel, one of the first two Saudi women to compete in the Dakar Rally. She finished 17th in the T3 class on her debut at the 2022 edition, and 24th in 2023. In 2022, she finished third in the T3 class of the FIA World Cup for Cross-Country Bajas.

Since 2024, AlObaidan has raced in the UIM E1 World Championship for electric powerboats. The Aoki Racing Team, in which she partnered Dani Clos, won the opening round of the 2025 season in Jeddah. She joined Team Blue Rising for the 2026 season.

== Early life and education ==
Mashael AlObaidan was born in 1987 or 1988. She is from Al-Khobar, in Saudi Arabia's Eastern Province. Her interest in off-roading began in childhood, when her father gave her a quad bike. He first taught her to drive in Al-Thumamah, near Riyadh.

While at university, AlObaidan played football, participating in matches in 2010 against clubs from the United Arab Emirates and Bahrain. She gained a Master's degree in systems engineering from Loyola Marymount University in Los Angeles.

In the United States, AlObaidan took dirt bike courses and obtained a motorcycle licence. She also completed navigation and safety training in California. She was inspired to take up the sport after watching films of women riding motorbikes.

== Racing career ==
=== Early career ===
After returning to Saudi Arabia, AlObaidan applied to the Saudi Automobile and Motorcycle Federation (SAMF) for a competition licence, and became the first Saudi woman to receive a rally licence. She took part in one stage of the Dakar Experience in 2019.

AlObaidan won her category at the Sharqiyah Baja in Saudi Arabia's Eastern Province in March 2021; her co-driver was Emirati Ali Mirza. That July, she competed in the Baja Aragón in Spain, her first event outside the Middle East, and finished seventh in her class. She became the first Saudi woman to compete in a European baja round. It was her only scoring round of the 2021 FIA World Cup for Cross-Country Bajas, and she finished 18th of 19 in the T3 drivers' standings. In December 2021, she finished second in the T3 category and 12th overall at the Hail International Rally. The event was the final round of the 2021 FIA World Cup for Cross-Country Rallies, and her result placed her seventh of 24 in that season's T3 drivers' standings.

=== Dakar rallies ===
In December 2020, AlObaidan and Dania Akeel were named co-captains of a women's team for the 2022 Dakar Rally. AlObaidan was the team's second driver and one of its project managers. They would become the first female drivers from Saudi Arabia to compete in the Dakar Rally. At the 2022 Rally, AlObaidan drove a Can-Am Maverick XRS for South Racing Middle East in the T3 lightweight prototype class, with Italian co-driver Jacopo Cerutti. Saudia Cargo sponsored her participation. After experiencing gearbox problems, she finished 17th in the T3 category, while Akeel finished eighth.

AlObaidan contested most of the 2022 FIA World Cup for Cross-Country Bajas in the T3 class. Saudia Cargo sponsored her entry in the Italian round in July. She later finished third in the T3 class at Baja Poland, the Saudi Baja and the Dubai International Baja. She ended the season third in the T3 drivers' standings.

At the 2023 Dakar Rally, AlObaidan drove for South Racing Can-Am in the T3 class, with Italian co-driver Paolo Ceci. She finished 24th of 38 classified T3 finishers, after receiving more than ten hours of penalties. She entered for 2024 Dakar Rally in the Challenger class under her own Team Mashael banner, but withdrew before the event.

=== E1 powerboat racing ===
In January 2024, AlObaidan was named lead pilot of the Aoki Racing Team, backed by the DJ Steve Aoki, for the first season of the UIM E1 World Championship, a series for all-electric powerboats. AlObaidan and her Spanish teammate Dani Clos were 8th of 9 in the end-of-season standings.

AlObaidan and Clos won the opening round of the championship's 2025 season, held on the Red Sea at Jeddah. They finished ahead of Rafael Nadal's Team Rafa and Virat Kohli's Team Blue Rising. AlObaidan called the win the best of her career. They were fourth of the nine teams in the standings at the conclusion of the season.

AlObaidan signed for Team Blue Rising for the 2026 season, but missed the opening round in Jeddah as she was recovering from an injury. She later raced for the team alongside John Peeters and the team finished 9th out of ten.

== Personal life ==
AlObaidan is a certified advanced scuba diver and freediver. She also practises portrait photography.

== Results ==
=== Dakar Rally ===
Dakar Rally results
Year	Class	Team	Co-driver	Vehicle	Position	Ref.
2022	T3	South Racing Middle East	Jacopo Cerutti	Can-Am Maverick XRS	17th	
2023	T3	South Racing Can-Am	Paolo Ceci	Can-Am Maverick XRS	24th	
2024	Challenger	Team Mashael	—	Can-Am Maverick X3	Withdrew	

=== FIA World Cup ===
FIA World Cup results
Season	Series	Class	Position	Points	Ref.
2021	World Cup for Cross-Country Bajas	T3	18th	4	
2021	World Cup for Cross-Country Rallies	T3	7th	20.5	
2022	World Cup for Cross-Country Bajas	T3	3rd	95	
