= 1944–45 Copa Federación de España =

Tournament details
- Country: Spain

Final positions
- Champions: San Martín
- Runners-up: Valladolid

Tournament statistics
- Matches played: 140
- Goals scored: 579 (4.14 per match)

The 1944–45 Copa Federación de España was the first staging (old competition) of the Copa Federación de España, a knockout competition for Spanish football clubs.

The competition began on 18 February 1945 and ended with the final on 21 May 1945, when San Martín became champion after defeating Valladolid.

== Competition ==
=== First round ===
Team 1	Agg.	Team 2	1st leg	2nd leg
Sans	2–3	San Martín	0–2	2–1
Gerona	4–4	Granollers	3–1	1–3
Júpiter	4–2	Lérida	4–1	0–1
Tarrasa	1–2	Reus	1–2	–
Galicia	1–0	Betanzos	1–0	0–0
Felguera	8–3	Oriamendi	6–1	2–2
Juvencia	3–1	Langreano	0–1	3–0
Universo	2–1	Santoña	1–1	1–0
Torrelavega	4–6	Tanagra	3–3	1–3
CES	2–3	Irún	2–2	0–1
Guecho	3–4	Durango	1–1	2–3
Erri Berri	4–5	Izarra	4–1	0–4
Segoviana	2–4	Palencia	2–0	0–4
Emeritense	3–13	Plasencia	2–2	1–11
Gimnástico Abad	3–10	Cartagena	1–6	2–4
Larache	3–8	Tetuán	1–2	2–6
Coria	6–3	Calavera	4–1	2–2

=== Second round ===
Team 1	Agg.	Team 2	1st leg	2nd leg
San Martín	3–1	Reus	1–1	2–0
Granollers	5–4	Júpiter	2–1	3–3
Santiago	4–3	Galicia	2–1	2–2
Pontevedra	5–2	Berbés	3–1	2–1
Monforte	3–5	Ponferradina	3–1	0–4
Borjas	1–4	Turista	0–1	1–3
Felguera	6–5	Juvencia	3–1	3–4
Tanagra	2–0	Universo	1–0	1–0
Irún	8–4	Vasconia	4–1	4–3
Durango	6–2	Sestao	3–0	3–2
Alavés	–	Tolosa	–	–
Mirandés	3–2	Indauchu	2–0	1–2
Izarra	3–8	Logroñés	1–0	2–8
Maestranza	5–4	Tudelano	4–2	1–2
Huesca	7–4	Atlético Zaragoza	4–2	3–2
Teruel	5–4	Escoriaza	2–0	3–4
Manacor	2–5	Atlético Baleares	2–3	0–2
Acero	3–7	Sueca	1–0	2–7
Albacete	2–5	Eldense	2–3	0–2
Alicante	0–6	Crevillente	0–1	0–5
Zamorano	2–3	Palencia	2–0	0–3
Béjar	3–5	Valladolid	2–0	1–5
Ávila	–	Ferroviaria	3–1	–
Toledo	9–3	Alcalá	7–0	2–3
Cacereño	3–3	Plasencia	3–1	0–2
Yeclano	4–11	Cieza	3–0	1–11
Imperial	4–3	Cartagena	3–1	1–2
Linense	5–2	Algeciras	4–2	1–0
Onuba	2–1	Coria	1–1	1–0
Linares	2–6	Jienense	2–3	0–3
Melilla	5–3	Tetuán	2–0	3–3

=== Fourth round ===
Team 1	Agg.	Team 2	1st leg	2nd leg
San Martín	9–7	Granollers	7–4	2–3
Ponferradina	2–4	Santiago	1–1	1–3
Pontevedra	1–4	Turista	1–0	0–4
Felguera	4–2	Tanagra	2–0	2–2
Irún	2–4	Alavés	1–2	1–2
Huesca	–	Teruel	1–1	–
Crevillente	3–13	Eldense	3–3	0–10
Cieza	2–13	Imperial	2–3	0–10
Talavera	4–8	Cacereño	3–0	1–8
Palencia	0–4	Valladolid	0–0	0–4
Ávila	2–3	Toledo	2–2	0–1
Jienense	2–3	Onuba	2–1	0–2
Melilla	1–1	Linense	1–0	0–1
Indauchu	6–5	Durango	1–2	5–3
Logroñés	3–1	Maestranza	3–0	0–1
Atlético Baleares	2–1	Sueca	1–0	1–1

=== Fifth round ===
Team 1	Agg.	Team 2	1st leg	2nd leg
Atlético Baleares	4–7	San Martín	3–3	1–4
Cacereño	5–4	Toledo	5–1	0–3
Imperial	4–5	Eldense	4–1	0–4
Onuba	2–0	Linense	2–0	0–0
Turista	2–5	Santiago	2–1	0–4
Huesca	2–3	Logroñés	1–2	1–1
Felguera	0–2	Valladolid	0–0	0–2
Indauchu	–	Alavés	–	–

=== Sixth Round ===
Team 1	Agg.	Team 2	1st leg	2nd leg
Eldense	5–8	San Martín	1–3	4–5
Santiago	3–4	Valladolid	2–0	1–4
Logroñés	4–2	Alavés	4–0	0–2
Onuba	4–6	Cacereño	3–3	1–3

=== Semi-finals ===
Team 1	Agg.	Team 2	1st leg	2nd leg
Logroñés	3–5	San Martín	2–2	1–3
Cacereño	3–4	Valladolid	3–0	0–4

=== Final ===
21 May 1945

San Martín	1 – 0	Valladolid

Camp de Les Corts, Barcelona
