= Kees Koolen =

Dutch rally raid racer and businessman

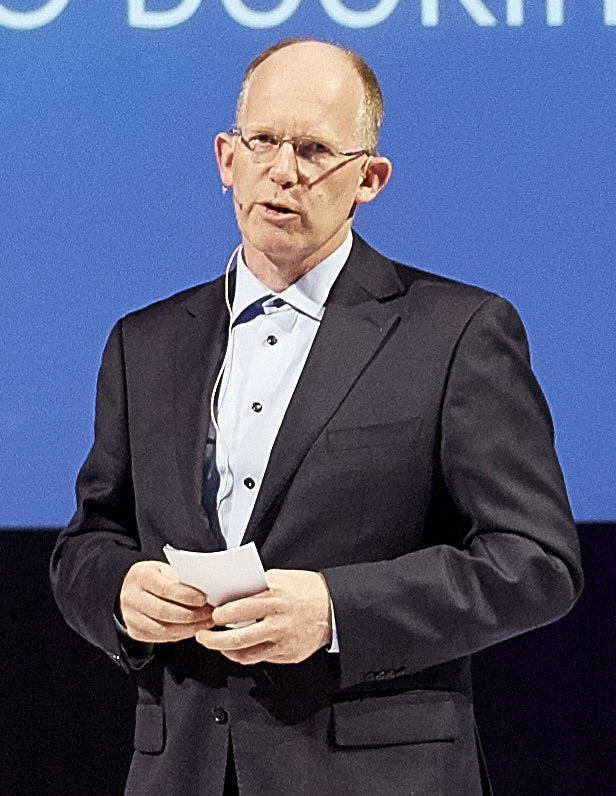
- Nationality: (Netherlands) Dutch
- Born: August 19, 1965 (age 61) Bergeijk, North Brabant

Dakar Rally career
- Debut season: 2009 Dakar Rally
- Current team: MM Technology
- Car number: 254
- Starts: 10
- Championships: 0
- Wins: 1
- Best finish: 17th in 2013 Dakar Rally and 2017 Dakar Rally

Previous series
- 2015-2017 2016: FIM Cross-Country Championship (Quad); Silk Way Rally

Championship titles
- 2017 2022: FIM Cross-Country Championship (Quad); World Rally-Raid Championship (truck)

Kees Koolen (born 19 August 1965 in Bergeijk, North Brabant) is a Dutch rally raid racer and businessman. Koolen participated in various rally raid competitions in a variety of vehicles. Koolen also was the CEO of Booking.com. Currently he is the Chairman/CEO of Koolen Industries: a Dutch clean energy conglomerate.

== Business career ==
Koolen studied technical business administration at the Twente University. Despite not graduating the university, started his own business as an advisor to different companies. During this time Koolen was an angel investor to different internet startups. Koolen was one of the founders of Booking.com, a price comparison website for hotels. He sold the company in 2005 to Booking Holdings for €110 million. Koolen remained Booking.com's CEO until 2011. In 2013 his wealth was estimated at €115 million, making him 232nd wealthiest person in the Netherlands.

When Uber placed its headquarters in Amsterdam, Koolen was named by Travis Kalanick as COO. Simultaneously, Koolen founded Agri Brasil, a conglomerate of large dairy farms.

In 2019 Koolen was profiled as a 'day dreamer.' by PVV States member Erik Veltmeijer in newspaper Dagblad De Gelderlander. Veltmeijer speaks of 'a complete failure' and qualifies director Kees Koolen of Lithium Werks en passant as a day dreamer.

== Rally raid ==
Koolen competed in his first Dakar Rally at the 2009 Dakar Rally. Racing a Honda CRF series CRF450 he finished 69th in the motorbike classification.

For the 2010 Dakar Rally, Koolen and his team raced a McRae Enduro buggy. Koolen had a troubled third stage. He passed all check points but stranded on his way to the bivak and had to retire. For the 2011 Dakar Rally Koolen developed his own buggy to compete, the GoKoBra. The team entered two GoKoBra's, one for Koolen and one for teammate Jurgen van den Goorbergh. Koolen was disqualified after the sixth stage. Koolen finished the sixth stage outside the time limit but was given dispensation by the organisation. The organisation later the decided to disqualify Koolen because he missed the first check point. The team finished the 2012 Dakar Rally in 59th place.

Koolen entered his first Dakar Rally with a quad at the 2013 Dakar Rally. He again finished the Dakar Rally, in 17th place. In 2014 Koolen became the first participant to finish the Dakar Rally in all four classes. In 2014 Koolen joined Van den Goorbergh and Gijs van Uden in a Ginaf truck entered by Maxxis Dakar Team Powered by Super B. The team finished in 37th place.

For 2015, Koolen developed his own quad off-road racer. During the Dakar Rally, Koolen was arrested by Chilean authorities. During the fifth stage, Koolen deviated from the determined route and drove through a protected area. Koolen was released after questioning. Koolen was not the only participant racing through a protected area in the Atacama Desert, Matteo Cassucio was also arrested. The following stage, Koolen retired from the rally. For 2016 Koolen returned in his Honda quad with top ten stage results. He did not finish the Dakar Rally after stage nine. After his retirement, an incident with a helicopter caused his quad (without rider) to drop fifty meters to the ground.

In 2017, Koolen and his team developed the Barren Racing quad racer. With his self developed quad he scored his first stage win. He won the 219 km stage between Tupiza and Oruro. The stage was shortened because of bad weather. Koolen finished the Dakar Rally in seventeenth place in class.

== Results ==
=== Rally Dakar ===
Year	Class	Vehicle	Position	Etapes
2009	Moto	Honda	69.º	-
2010	Auto	McRae	Ret.	-
2011	Auto	Hyundai	Ret.	-
2012	Auto	Buggy	59.º	-
2013	Quads	Honda	17.º	-
2014	Truck	Ginaf	37.º	-
2015	Moto	Honda	Ret.	-
2016	Moto	Honda	Ret.	-
2017	Quad	Barren	17.º	1
2018	Quad	Barren	8.º	-
2021	SSVs	Can-Am	6.º	-
2022	Truck	Iveco	13.º	-
2023	Truck	Iveco	Ret.	-
2025	Truck	Iveco	4.º	-
Fuente:
