= Fina Román =

Spanish off-road racing codriver and navigator (born 1965)

Fina Román (born 16 May 1965 in Almería) is a Spanish off-road racing codriver and navigator. She is married with the off road racing driver Josep María Serviá, who is the main reason why she started to compete, since he was attendant to the Dakar Rally in the 90s. Román started in the Schlesser Team, participating in assistance vehicles. Besides an assistant, she has also competed in car and trucks categories. Then, she moved in 2006 to official competition, as a navigator in the KH7-Epsilon Team, in the 6x6 trucks category, together with driver Jordi Juvanteny and co-driver José Luis Criado.

The team failed to complete the race in 2006 and 2007 editions, because of technical problems. In 2008, they won the Central Europe Rally in the 6x6 trucks category, and in 2009 they won the Dakar Rally in their category and finished 9th overall.

She was the single Spanish female competitor in 2010 Dakar Rally, when she was again winner in the 6x6 trucks category, repeating the 9th overall in the trucks final classification.
