= Ricardo Zulueta =

Spanish footballer (1907–1937)

Personal information
- Full name: Ricardo Zulueta Echevarria
- Date of birth: 8 October 1907
- Place of birth: Vitoria-Gasteiz, Spain
- Date of death: 7 September 1937 (aged 29)
- Position: Defender

Senior career*
Years	Team	Apps	(Gls)
1928–1930	Atlético Madrid		
1930–1934	Castilla CF		
1934–1936	Nacional de Madrid		
- * Club domestic league appearances and goals

Ricardo Zulueta Echevarria (8 October 1907 – 7 September 1937) was a Spanish footballer who played as a defender for Atlético Madrid and Nacional de Madrid.

== Early life ==
Ricardo Zulueta was born in Vitoria-Gasteiz, Álava, on 8 October 1907, as the son of Adolfo Juan de Zulueta y Ruiz de Gámiz and María de los Dolores de Echevarría y Díaz de Mendívil.

== Career ==
Zulueta signed for the rojiblanco club in the 1927–28 season, making his debut in a 1928 Copa del Rey group stage match against Athletic Bilbao on 11 March 1928, starting as a goalkeeper in a 2–4 loss. In two years there, he played mostly as a substitute and only made three appearances in the newly-formed La Liga. He then went on to play for the Castilla CF of the Tercera División, which later became a feeder club for Real Madrid, from where he went to Nacional de Madrid of the Segunda División, with whom he played for two seasons between 1934 and 1936, under coach Josep Samitier, featuring alongside another former Atlético player Francisco Moriones.

On 7 June 1936, Zulueta played with Nacional de Madrid against the Railway Sports Group in an amateur tournament while the coup d'état that was going to precipitate the Spanish Civil War was being plotted. On 23 August, he played his last football match representing a Madrid selection against a AD Tarancón side that was reinforced by players from Madrid, to benefit the blood hospitals that were receiving wounded from the war front.

== Later life and death ==
In early October, Zulueta joined the republican militias and fought in them during the battle for Madrid in November, stationed in the central sector as a dynamiter. On that date the name of the athlete and now soldier of the Popular Front is lost. Some believe he was shot in Vitoria-Gasteiz on 7 September 1937, but since there is no reference to his disappearance, some have speculated that he survived the armed conflict. On 26 April 1939, his wife María Teresa de Pobes Salvador was awarded the Medal of Suffering for the Homeland.

His father was a small merchant who supported the Second Spanish Republic, and on 20 July 1936, he placed himself at the disposal of the Madrid government and against fascism, joining the police force. In early April 1939, he was arrested by the Francoists and locked up in the Almagro police station in the Chamberí neighborhood, where he was tortured for 15 days with four or five beatings a day. He unsuccessfully attempted suicide, so he was locked up in the Yeserías Prison, where the prisoners themselves treated the multiple wounds that his body had received, which is the last known whereabouts of the Zulueta family.
