= 2024 Dakar Rally =

Motorsport event in Saudi Arabia

Part of the Dakar Rally
← Previous event	Next event →
- Host country: Saudi Arabia
- Dates run: 6–19 January 2024
- Start: Al-'Ula
- Finish: Yanbu
- Stages: 12
- Stage surface: Sand, rocks, gravel, tarmac

Results
- Cars winner: (Spain) Carlos Sainz (Spain) Lucas Cruz; Team Audi Sport
- Bikes winner: (United States) Ricky Brabec; Monster Energy Honda Team
- Quads winner: (Argentina) Manuel Andújar; 7240 Team
- Challenger winner: (Spain) Cristina Gutiérrez (Spain) Pablo Moreno Huete; Red Bull Off-Road JR Team USA By BFG
- SSVs winner: (France) Xavier de Soultrait (France) Martin Bonnet; Sébastien Loeb Racing - Bardahl Team
- Trucks winner: (Czech Republic) Martin Macík (Czech Republic) František Tomášek (Czech Republic) David Švanda; MM Technology
- Classics winner: (Spain) Carlos Santaolalla (Spain) Jan Rosa i Viñas; Factorytub
- Mission 1000 winner: (Spain) Jordi Juvanteny (Spain) José Luis Criado (Spain) Xavier Ribas; KH7-Ecovergy Team

The 2024 Dakar Rally was a rally raid event held in Saudi Arabia. It was the 46th edition of the Dakar Rally, organized by Amaury Sport Organisation (ASO), and the 5th time Saudi Arabia has hosted the event.

The event took place between 5 and 19 January 2024. For the third year running, the event was also the first round of the 2024 World Rally-Raid Championship.

The outline of the race route was presented on 3 June 2023. This year the route started at Al-'Ula, then across the Empty Quarter, and finished in Yanbu. The race format consisted of a prologue and 12 stages, including a 48-hour marathon stage - dubbed as a '48h chrono stage', which covered over 600km with a midnight halt. The new format marathon stage included time limit for stopping at 4pm, and setting off the next day at 7am. The route featured 60% new tracks compared to the previous edition, comprising 5,000 kilometres of special stages.

== Timeline ==
- 3 June – 20 October 2023: Registrations
- End of November 2023: Press conference
- 1 December 2023: Scrutineering and vehicle loading in Barcelona
- 1 January 2024: Offloading vehicles in Yanbu
- 5 January 2024: Starting podium and the Prologue Stage
- 6 January 2024: Race start
- 19 January 2024: Race finish and finish podium

== Entry list ==
On 13 December 2023 ASO announced the list of competitors.

=== Number of entries ===
Stage	Bikes	Quads	Cars	Challenger (T3)	SSV (T4)	Trucks	Total	Classic Cars	Classic Trucks	Total Dakar Classic
Entry list (Note: As of 23 December, before scrutineering)	136	10	73	43	36	47	345	65	15	80
At start line	132	10	73	42	36	47	340	64	14	78
Rest day (Note: At start line after the rest day)	113	9	65	38	33	40	298	61	14	75
Finished (Note: To rank in the final standings, the vehicle had to pass through the finishing podium.) (Note: There was no Dakar Experience category this year. As the Dakar Rally became a FIA event, the vehicles that failed to finish a stage could still continue at the next, having taken a time penalty.)	96	7	55	28	26	20	232	57	14	71

=== Vehicles and Categories ===
Vehicles and Categories

Category	Bikes		Quads		Cars		Challenger (T3)		SSV (T4)		Trucks		Classic Cars		Classic Trucks	
	Class	Description	Class	Description	Class	Description	Class	Description	Class	Description	Class	Description	Class	Description	Class	Description
	RallyGP	A.S.O. "Elite"			ULT T1.U	T1 electric/hybrid 4x4 modified	T3	Light Prototypes	T4	Production SSVs turbo	Truck>10,000cc	Modified & Production Trucks	-86 Low Average	TBC	-86 Low Average	TBC
	Rally2	"Non-Elite" Super-Production			ULT T1+	T1 upgraded 4x4 modified							-86 Intermediate Average	TBC	-86 Moderate Average	TBC
					ULT T1.1	T1 prototype 4x4 modified							-86 Moderate Average	TBC	87-96 Low Average	TBC
					ULT T1.2	T1 prototype 2WD modified							87-96 Low Average	TBC	87-96 Moderate Average	TBC
					Stock (T2)	T2 Production							87-96 Intermediate Average	TBC	+97 Moderate Average	TBC
													87-96 Moderate Average	TBC		
													87-96 High Average	TBC		
													+97 Intermediate Average	TBC		
													+97 Moderate Average	TBC		
													+97 High Average	TBC		

=== Competitor list ===
Entry list — Bikes

Note
– The "Dakar Legends" - competitors that participated in 10 or more Dakar events.
– The first time starters - "rookies".
– Competitors that were not able to start the race.
– Competitors participating in "Original by Motul" — limited assistance marathon class.

No.	Driver	Bike	Team	Class
1	(Argentina) Luciano Benavides	Husqvarna 450 Rally Factory Replica	Husqvarna Factory Racing	RallyGP
2	(Australia) Toby Price	KTM 450 Rally Factory Replica	Red Bull KTM Factory Team	RallyGP
4	(United Kingdom) Sam Sunderland	Gas Gas 450 Rally Factory Replica	Red Bull GasGas Factory Racing	RallyGP
5	(Australia) Daniel Sanders	Gas Gas 450 Rally Factory Replica	Red Bull GasGas Factory Racing	RallyGP
7	(Chile) Pablo Quintanilla	Honda CRF450 Rally	Monster Energy Honda Team	RallyGP
9	(United States) Ricky Brabec	Honda CRF450 Rally	Monster Energy Honda Team	RallyGP
10	(United States) Skyler Howes	Honda CRF450 Rally	Monster Energy Honda Team	RallyGP
11	(Chile) José Ignacio Cornejo	Honda CRF450 Rally	Monster Energy Honda Team	RallyGP
14	(Germany) Sebastian Bühler	Hero 450 Rally	Hero Motosports Team Rally	RallyGP
15	(Spain) Lorenzo Santolino	Sherco 450 SEF Rally	Sherco TVS Rally Factory	RallyGP
16	(France) Romain Dumontier	Husqvarna 450 Rally	Team Dumontier Racing	Rally2
17	(Italy) Paolo Lucci	KTM 450 Rally Replica	BAS World KTM Racing Team	Rally2
18	(South Africa) Bradley Cox	KTM 450 Rally Replica	BAS World KTM Racing Team	Rally2
19	(Portugal) Rui Gonçalves	Sherco 450 SEF Rally	Sherco TVS Rally Factory	RallyGP
20	(India) Harith Noah Koitha Veettil	Sherco 450 SEF Rally	Sherco TVS Rally Factory	Rally2
21	(United States) Jacob Argubright	KTM 450 Rally Replica	Duust Rally Team	Rally2
22	(South Africa) Michael Docherty	KTM 450 Rally Replica	BAS Dakar KTM Racing Team	Rally2
23	(Czech Republic) Martin Michek	KTM 450 Rally Replica	Orion - Moto Racing Group	RallyGP
24	(Slovenia) Toni Mulec	KTM 450 Rally Replica	BAS Dakar KTM Racing Team	Rally2
26	(Poland) Konrad Dabrowski	KTM 450 Rally Replica	Duust Rally Team	Rally2
27	(Portugal) Joaquim Rodrigues	Hero 450 Rally	Hero Motosports Team Rally	RallyGP
28	(France) Mathieu Doveze	KTM 450 Rally Factory Replica	BAS Dakar KTM Racing Team	Rally2
29	(France) Neels Theric	Kove 450 Rally	Kove Rally Team	Rally2
30	(Portugal) Antonio Maio	Yamaha WR450F Rally	Yamaha Portugal	RallyGP
31	(Poland) Maciej Giemza	Husqvarna FR 450 Rally	Orlen Team	RallyGP
32	(United States) Kyle McCoy	KTM 450 Rally Replica	BAS Dakar KTM Racing Team	Rally2
33	(Czech Republic) Jan Brabec	KTM 450 Rally Replica	Strojrent Racing	Rally2
34	(Romania) Emanuel Gyenes	KTM 450 Rally Replica	Autonet Motorcycle Team	Rally2
36	(Portugal) Mario Patrão	KTM 450 Rally Replica	Crédit Agricola - Mario Patrão Motorsport	Rally2
37	(Belgium) Jérôme Martiny	Husqvarna 450 Rally	Anquety Motorsport	Rally2
38	(Spain) Eduardo Iglesias Sánchez	KTM 450 Rally Replica	Team Benergy Monforte Rally	Rally2
39	(France) Benjamin Melot	KTM 450 Rally Replica	Team Esprit KTM	Rally2
40	(Spain) Javi Vega	Yamaha WR450F Rally	Pont Grup Yamaha	Rally2
41	(Argentina) Diego Gamaliel Llanos	KTM 450 Rally Replica	Xraids Experience	Rally2
42	(France) Adrien Van Beveren	Honda CRF450 Rally	Monster Energy Honda Team	RallyGP
43	(Czech Republic) Milan Engel	KTM 450 Rally Replica	Orion-Moto Racing Group	Rally2
45	(China) Sunier Sunier (Ni-Er Su)	Kove 450 Rally	Kove Rally Team	Rally2
46	(Botswana) Ross Branch	Hero 450 Rally	Hero Motosports Team Rally	RallyGP
47	(Argentina) Kevin Benavides	KTM 450 Rally Factory Replica	Red Bull KTM Factory Team	RallyGP
49	(Italy) Cesare Zacchetti	Kove 450 Rally	Kove Italia	Rally2
51	(Spain) Rachid Al-Lal Lahadil	Husqvarna 450 Rally Replica	Melilla Sport Capital	Rally2
53	(Denmark) Thomas Kongshøj	KTM 450 Rally Replica	Joyride Race Service	Rally2
55	(China) Zaker Yakefu	KTM 450 Rally Replica	Wu Pu Da Hai Dao Rally Team	Rally2
56	(Slovenia) Simon Marčič	Husqvarna 450 Rally Replica	JP1 Kews Dakar Rally Team	Rally2
57	(Italy) Tommaso Montanari	Fantic XEF Rally 450	Fantic Rally Team	Rally2
59	(Guatemala) Francisco Arredondo	KTM 450 Rally Replica	BAS World KTM Racing Team	Rally2
60	(France) Xavier Flick	Kove 450 Rally	Kove Rally Team	Rally2
61	(Czech Republic) David Pabiška	KTM 450 Rally Replica	SP Moto Bohemia Racing Team	Rally2
62	(France) Jeremy Miroir	Fantic XEF Rally 450	Fantic Rally Team	Rally2
63	(Czech Republic) Jaromír Romančík	KTM 450 Rally Replica	Orion-Moto Racing Group	Rally2
64	(France) Romain Duchêne	KTM 450 Rally Replica	Team GP Motors	Rally2
65	(France) Guillaume Chollet	KTM 450 Rally Replica	Xraids Experience	Rally2
66	(Japan) Yoshio Ikemachi	KTM 450 Rally Replica	BAS Dakar KTM Racing Team	Rally2
67	(Chile) John William Medina Salazar	KTM 450 Rally Replica	Xraids Experience	Rally2
68	(Spain) Tosha Schareina	Honda CRF450 Rally	Monster Energy Honda Team	RallyGP
69	(Spain) Cesar Rojo	KTM 450 Rally	BAS World KTM Racing Team	Rally2
70	(Czech Republic) Dušan Drdaj	KTM 450 Rally Replica	Orion-Moto Racing Group	Rally2
71	(Italy) Francesco Catanese	Honda CRF450 Rally	Tuttogru	Rally2
72	(France) Philippe Gendron	KTM 450 Rally Replica	Nomade Racing	Rally2
73	(South Africa) Charan Moore	Husqvarna 450 Rally	HT Rally Raid Husqvarna Racing	Rally2
74	(France) Michael Jacobi	Gas Gas 450 Rally Replica	Comas Moto / Môle Agri Forest	Rally2
75	(China) Zhang Min	KTM 450 Rally Replica	Wu Pu Da Hai Dao Rally Team	Rally2
76	(France) Jean-Loup Lepan	KTM 450 Rally Replica	Duust Racing Team	Rally2
78	(China) Zhao Hongyi	KTM 450 Rally Factory Replica	Wu Pu Da Hai Dao Rally Team	Rally2
79	(France) Amaury Baratin	KTM 450 Rally Factory Replica	Horizon Moto 95	Rally2
80	(Portugal) Alexandre Azinhais	KTM 450 Rally Replica	Club Aventura Touareg	Rally2
81	(China) Fang Xiangling	Kove 450 Rally	Kove Rally Team	Rally2
82	(Spain) Albert Martin Garcia	Husqvarna 450 Rally	Pedrega Team	Rally2
83	(France) Fabien Domas	Gas Gas 450 Rally Replica	Nomade Racing	Rally2
84	(Italy) Tiziano Interno	Gas Gas 450 Rally Replica	Rally POV	Rally2
85	(France) Thierry Béthys	Honda CRF450 Rally	TB Racing	Rally2
86	(France) Charlie Herbst	Gas Gas 450 Rally Replica	Team All Tracks	Rally2
87	(Czech Republic) Libor Podmol	Husqvarna 450 Rally	Podmol Dakar Team	Rally2
88	(Spain) Joan Barreda	Hero 450 Rally	Hero Motosports Team Rally	RallyGP
89	(Austria) Ardit Kurtaj	Husqvarna 450 Rally	HT Rally Raid Husqvarna Racing	Rally2
90	(France) Loïs d'Abbadie	Husqvarna 450 Rally	Nomade Racing	Rally2
92	(United Kingdom) David Mabbs	Husqvarna 450 Rally	Vendetta Racing UAE	Rally2
93	(United Kingdom) David McBride	Husqvarna 450 Rally	Vendetta Racing UAE	Rally2
94	(Republic of Ireland) Oran O'Kelly	Husqvarna 450 Rally	Vendetta Racing UAE	Rally2
95	(Spain) Dominique Cizeau Girault	KTM 450 Rally Replica	Xraids Experience	Rally2
96	(Austria) Tobias Ebster	KTM 450 Rally Replica	Kini Rally Racing Team	Rally2
97	(Ecuador) Juan Puga	KTM 450 Rally Replica	JP1 Kews Dakar Rally Team	Rally2
98	(United States) Mason Klein	Kove 450 Rally EX	Klein Off-Road Racing Team	RallyGP
99	(Argentina) Juan Santiago Rostan	KTM 450 Rally Replica	Xraids Experience	Rally2
100	(South Africa) Stuart Gregory	KTM 450 Rally Replica	Stuart Gregory	Rally2
101	(Czech Republic) Martin Prokeš	KTM 450 Rally Replica	Orion-Moto Racing Group	Rally2
102	(Poland) Bartłomiej Tabin	KTM 450 Rally Replica	Orion-Moto Racing Group	Rally2
103	(Zimbabwe) Ashley Thixton	Husqvarna 450 Rally	HT Rally Raid Husqvarna Racing	Rally2
104	(France) Jérémie Gerber	KTM 450 Rally Replica	Stuart Gregory	Rally2
105	(France) Julien Dalbec	KTM 450 Rally Replica	Nomade Racing	Rally2
106	(France) Jérôme Bas	KTM 450 Rally Replica	Universal Ride	Rally2
107	(Greece) Vasileios Boudros	Husqvarna 450 Rally	DNA Filters – Enduro Greece	Rally2
108	(India) Ashish Raorane	KTM 450 Rally Replica	Xraids Experience	Rally2
109	(Morocco) Mohamed Said Aoulad Ali	KTM 450 EXC	Club Aventura Touareg	Rally2
110	(United Kingdom) Jane Daniels	Fantic XEF Rally 450	Fantic Rally Team	Rally2
111	(Germany) Yael Kadshai	Gas Gas 450 Rally Replica	Nomade Racing	Rally2
112	(Italy) Gioele Meoni	KTM 450 Rally Replica	Dakar4Dakar	Rally2
113	(Argentina) Sebastián Alberto Urquía	KTM 450 Rally Replica	Xraids Experience	Rally2
114	(Spain) Carlos Llibre Beltri	Gas Gas 450 Rally Replica	ALL1 Dakar	Rally2
115	(Spain) Josep Pedró Subirats	Husqvarna 450 Rally	ALL1 Dakar	Rally2
116	(Spain) Xavier Pes Bosck	Gas Gas 450 Rally Replica	ALL1 Dakar	Rally2
117	(Spain) Josep Martí Suñer	Gas Gas 450 Rally Replica	ALL1 Dakar	Rally2
118	(Spain) Fernando Conde Targa	KTM 450 Rally Replica	ALL1 Dakar	Rally2
119	(Spain) Javier Amat de Caralt	Gas Gas 450 Rally Replica	ALL1 Dakar	Rally2
120	(Belgium) Joris Van Dyck	Husqvarna 450 Rally	HT Rally Raid Husqvarna Racing	Rally2
121	(France) James Simonin	Husqvarna 450 Rally	Nomade Racing	Rally2
122	(Saudi Arabia) Abdulhalim Al-Mogheera	KTM 450 Rally Replica	Haleem	Rally2
123	(Italy) Fabio Lottero	Husqvarna 450 Rally	Touareg Ibiza – Evissa Esports	Rally2
124	(South Africa) Kerim Fitz-Gerald	KTM 450 Rally Replica	BAS Dakar KTM Racing Team	Rally2
125	(Italy) Iader Giraldi	KTM 450 Rally Factory Replica	Zeranta	Rally2
126	(Spain) Mario Garrido	KTM 450 Rally Replica	Pedrega Team	Rally2
127	(South Africa) Ronald Venter	KTM 450 Rally Replica	Nomade Racing	Rally2
128	(France) Max Bianucci	Husqvarna 450 Rally	Nomade Racing	Rally2
129	(France) Sébastien Herbet	Husqvarna 450 Rally	Team Dumontier Racing	Rally2
130	(Spain) Javier Campos Dono	KTM 450 Rally Replica	Joyrace	Rally2
131	(France) Anthony Fabre	KTM 450 EXC	Team RAF	Rally2
132	(France) Andy Beaucoud	Husqvarna 450 Rally	Team RAF	Rally2
133	(France) Bruno Leblanc	KTM 450 Rally Replica	Un Dakar Pour De L’espoir	Rally2
134	(Spain) Isaac Feliu	KTM 450 Rally Replica	TwinTrail Racing Team	Rally2
135	(Spain) Carles Falcón	KTM 450 Rally Replica	TwinTrail Racing Team	Rally2
136	(United States) Weston Carr	Husqvarna 450 Rally	HT Rally Raid Husqvarna Racing	Rally2
137	(Belgium) Gwen Backx	Husqvarna 450 Rally	HT Rally Raid Husqvarna Racing	Rally2
138	(Belgium) Pierre Saeys	Husqvarna 450 Rally	HT Rally Raid Husqvarna Racing	Rally2
139	(Lithuania) Modestas Siliūnas	KTM 450 Rally Replica	AG Dakar School	Rally2
140	(Portugal) Bruno Santos	Husqvarna 450 Rally	Xraids Experience	Rally2
141	(France) Vincent Biau	Husqvarna 450 Rally	VB × Kray&Co	Rally2
142	(Slovakia) Štefan Svitko	KTM 450 Rally Factory Replica	Slovnaft Rally Team	RallyGP
143	(Mexico) Hector Guerrero	Husqvarna 450 Rally	Pedrega Team	Rally2
144	(Uruguay) Fabián von Thuengen	Husqvarna 450 Rally	HT Rally Raid Husqvarna Racing	Rally2
145	(Mongolia) Ganzorig Chuluun	Husqvarna 450 Rally	HT Rally Raid Husqvarna Racing	Rally2
146	(Portugal) Gad Nachmani	KTM 450 Rally Replica	Club Aventura Touareg	Rally2
147	(France) Mathieu Girard	KTM 450 Rally Replica	Nomade Racing	Rally2
148	(Chile) Tomás de Gavardo	KTM 450 Rally Replica	BAS World KTM Racing Team	Rally2

Withdrawals before the start:

- 52 Matthias Walkner

Entry list — Quads

Note
– The "Dakar Legends" - competitors that participated in 10 or more Dakar events.
– The first time starters - "rookies".
– Competitors that were not able to start the race.
– Competitors participating in "Original by Motul" — limited assistance marathon class.

No.	Driver	Quad	Team
170	(Lithuania) Laisvydas Kancius	Yamaha Raptor 700R	Story Racing SRO
171	(Slovakia) Juraj Varga	Yamaha Raptor 700R	Varga Motorsport
172	(France) Alexandre Giroud	Yamaha Raptor 700R	Drag’on Rally Team
173	(Argentina) Francisco Moreno Flores	Yamaha Raptor 700R	Drag’on Rally Team
174	(Argentina) Manuel Andújar	Yamaha Raptor 700R	7240 Team
175	(Lithuania) Antanas Kanopkinas	CFMOTO CFORCE 1000	CFMOTO Thunder Racing Team
176	(Spain) Toni Vingut	Yamaha Raptor 700R	Visit Sant Antoni - Ibiza
177	(Brazil) Marcelo Medeiros	Yamaha Raptor 700R	Taguatur Racing Team
178	(France) Samuel Desbuisson	Yamaha Raptor 700R	Drag’on Rally Team
179	(Saudi Arabia) Hani Al-Noumesi	Yamaha Raptor 700R	Hani Al-Noumesi

Entry list — Cars

Note
– The "Dakar Legends" - competitors that participated in 10 or more Dakar events.
– The first time starters - "rookies".
– Competitors that were not able to start the race.

No.	Driver	Co-driver	Vehicle	Team	Class
200	(Qatar) Nasser Al-Attiyah	(France) Mathieu Baumel	Prodrive Hunter T1+	Nasser Racing	T1+
201	(Saudi Arabia) Yazeed Al-Rajhi	(Germany) Timo Gottschalk	Toyota Hilux Overdrive	Overdrive Racing	T1+
202	(France) Stéphane Peterhansel	(France) Édouard Boulanger	Audi RS Q e-tron	Team Audi Sport	T1.U
203	(France) Sébastien Loeb	(France) Fabian Lurquin	Prodrive Hunter T1+	Bahrain Raid Xtreme	T1+
204	(Spain) Carlos Sainz	(Spain) Lucas Cruz	Audi RS Q e-tron	Team Audi Sport	T1.U
205	(Argentina) Juan Cruz Yacopini	(Spain) Daniel Oliveras Carreras	Toyota Hilux Overdrive	Overdrive Racing	T1+
206	(Brazil) Lucas Moraes	(Spain) Armand Monleón	Toyota GR DKR Hilux	Toyota Gazoo Racing	T1+
207	(Sweden) Mattias Ekström	(Sweden) Emil Bergkvist	Audi RS Q e-tron	Team Audi Sport	T1.U
208	(Czech Republic) Martin Prokop	(Czech Republic) Viktor Chytka	Ford Raptor RS Cross Country	Orlen Jipocar Team	T1+
209	(South Africa) Giniel de Villiers	(South Africa) Dennis Murphy	Toyota GR DKR Hilux	Toyota Gazoo Racing	T1+
210	(Spain) Nani Roma	(Spain) Alex Haro Bravo	Ford Ranger	M-Sport Ford World Rally Team	T1+
211	(France) Guerlain Chicherit	(France) Alex Winocq	Toyota Hilux Overdrive	Overdrive Racing	T1+
212	(France) Mathieu Serradori	(France) Loïc Minaudier	Century CR6-T	Century Racing Factory Team	T1.2
214	(Lithuania) Vaidotas Žala	(Portugal) Paulo Fiuza	Mini John Cooper Works Rally Plus	X-Raid Arijus Team	T1+
215	(Kyrgyzstan) Denis Krotov	Konstantin Zhiltsov	Toyota Hilux Overdrive	Overdrive Racing	T1+
216	(United States) Seth Quintero	(Germany) Dennis Zenz	Toyota GR DKR Hilux	Toyota Gazoo Racing	T1+
217	(Poland) Krzysztof Hołowczyc	(Poland) Łukasz Kurzeja	Mini John Cooper Works Rally Plus	X-raid Mini JCW Team	T1+
218	(China) Han Wei	(China) Ma Li	Red-Lined HW2024	HanWei Motorsport Team	T1+
219	(South Africa) Brian Baragwanath	(South Africa) Leonard Cremer	Century CR7-T	Century Racing Factory Team	T1+
220	(France) Christian Lavieille	(France) Valentin Sarreaud	MD Rallye Sport Optimus	MD Rallye Sport	T1.2
221	(Belgium) Guillaume De Mévius	(France) Xavier Panseri	Toyota Hilux Overdrive	Overdrive Racing	T1+
222	(France) Simon Vitse	(France) Frédéric Lefebvre	MD Rallye Sport Optimus	MD Rallye Sport	T1.2
223	(Lithuania) Benediktas Vanagas	(Estonia) Kuldar Sikk	Toyota GR DKR Hilux	Toyota Gazoo Racing Baltics	T1+
225	(South Africa) Gareth Woolridge	(South Africa) Boyd Dreyer	Ford Ranger	M-Sport Ford World Rally Team	T1+
226	(South Africa) Saood Variawa	(France) François Cazalet	Toyota GR DKR Hilux	Toyota Gazoo Racing	T1+
227	(Italy) Eugenio Amos	(Italy) Paolo Ceci	Toyota Hilux Overdrive	Overdrive Racing	T1+
228	(France) Jérôme Pelichet	(France) Pascal Larroque	MD Rallye Sport Optimus	MD Rallye Sport	T1.2
229	(France) Lionel Baud	(France) Lucie Baud	Toyota Hilux Overdrive	Overdrive Racing	T1+
230	(Spain) Pau Navarro	(Portugal) Gonçalo Reis	Mini John Cooper Works Rally Plus	X-raid Mini JCW Team	T1+
231	(France) Romain Dumas	(France) Max Delfino	Toyota GR DKR Hilux	Rebellion Racing	T1+
232	(France) Pascal Thomasse	(France) Arnold Brucy	MD Rallye Sport Optimus	MD Rallye Sport	T1.2
234	(France) Jean-Rémy Bergounhe	(France) Lionel Costes	MD Rallye Sport Optimus	MD Rallye Sport	T1.2
235	(Spain) Isidre Esteve	(Spain) Jose Maria Villalobos	Toyota Hilux Overdrive	Repsol Toyota Rally Team	T1+
236	(France) Ronan Chabot	(France) Giles Pillot	Toyota Hilux Overdrive	Overdrive Racing	T1+
237	(Netherlands) Tim Coronel	(Netherlands) Tom Coronel	Century CR6	Coronel Dakar Team	T1.2
238	(Spain) Laia Sanz	(Italy) Maurizio Gerini	Astara CR6-T	Astara Team	T1.2
239	(Seychelles) Aliyyah Koloc	(France) Sébastien Delaunay	Red-Lined Revo+	Buggyra ZM Racing	T1+
240	(Lithuania) Vladas Jurkevicius	(Lithuania) Aisvydas Paliukenas	Toyota GR DKR Hilux	Toyota Gazoo Racing Baltics	T1+
241	(France) Jean-Luc Ceccaldi	(France) Thomas Gaidella	MD Rallye Sport Optimus	MD Rallye Sport	T1.2
242	(Brazil) Marcos Baumgart	(Brazil) Kleber Cincea	Prodrive Hunter T1+	X Rally	T1+
243	(South Africa) Guy David Botterill	(South Africa) Brett Cummings	Toyota GR DKR Hilux	Toyota Gazoo Racing	T1+
244	(France) Jean-Pierre Strugo	(France) Christophe Crespo	MD Rallye Sport Optimus	MD Rallye Sport	T1.2
245	(Brazil) Cristian Baumgart	(Brazil) Alberto Andreotti	Prodrive Hunter T1+	X Rally	T1+
246	(France) Frédéric Chesneau	(France) Lionel Romanin	Century CR6	Skybox - BTR	T1.2
247	(Netherlands) Michel Kremer	(Netherlands) Thomas De Bois	Century CR6	Coronel Dakar Team	T1.2
248	(Czech Republic) Tomas Ourednicek	(Czech Republic) David Kripal	Toyota GR DKR Hilux	Toyota Gazoo Racing Czech	T1+
249	(China) Liu Feilong	(China) Wang Yicheng	Prodrive Hunter T1+	Yunxiang China T1+ Team	T1+
250	(Estonia) Urvo Männamaa	(Estonia) Risto Lepik	Century CR7-T	Rally Raid Estonia	T1+
251	(Switzerland) Alexandre Pesci	(Switzerland) Stephan Kuhni	Toyota GR DKR Hilux	Rebellion Racing	T1+
252	(China) Sun Ping	(China) Liao Min	Prodrive Hunter T1+	Yunxiang China T1+ Team	T1+
253	(France) Philippe Boutron	(France) Franck Maldonado	Sodicars BV2	Sodicars Racing	T1.2
254	(China) Zi Yungang	(China) Pan Hongyu	Prodrive Hunter T1+	Yunxiang China T1+ Team	T1+
255	(France) Dominique Housieaux	(France) Delphine Delfino	Century CR6	SRT	T1.2
256	(China) Sun Xiangyan	(China) Tian Yu	SMG HW2023	Hanwei Motorsport Team	T1.2
257	(France) François Cousin	(France) Stéphane Cousin	MD Rallye Sport Optimus	Team Cousin	T1.2
258	(South Africa) Hennie de Klerk	(South Africa) Juan Möhr	Toyota Gazoo Racing Hilux	TreasuryOne	T1+
259	(Lithuania) Gintas Petrus	(Portugal) Jose Marques	MD Rallye Sport Optimus	Petrus Racing Team	T1.2
260	(Italy) Andrea Schiumarini	(Italy) Andrea Succi	Century CR6	TH-Trucks Team	T1.2
261	(France) Benoit Fretin	(France) Cédric Duple	Century CR6	Ydeo Compétition	T1.2
262	(Uruguay) Patricia Pita Gago	(Chile) Paolo Boggioni	Astara CR6-T	Astara Team	T1.2
264	(Netherlands) Maik Willems	(Netherlands) Robert van Pelt	Toyota Gazoo Racing Hilux	Bastion Hotels Dakar Team	T1+
266	(Switzerland) Cédric Goumaz	(France) Pascal Delacour	MD Rallye Sport Optimus	MD Rallye Sport	T1.2
267	(France) Jérôme Gambier	(France) Philippe Gosselin	MD Rallye Sport Optimus	MD Rallye Sport	T1.2
268	(Belgium) Stefan Carmans	(Netherlands) Antonius van Tiel	Red-Lined Revo+	CSA Racing	T1+
269	(France) Antoine Deleporte	(France) Yoann François	Constant LCR30	YCMCNC.COM	T1.2
270	(France) Patrice Etienne	(France) Antoine Sanchez	Century CR6	Ydeo Compétition	T1.2
271	(Italy) Silvio Totani	(Italy) Tito Totani	Nissan Patrol	Motortecnica Racing Team	T1.1
272	(France) Jean-Philippe Beziat	(France) Vincent Albira	MD Rallye Sport Optimus	MD Rallye Sport	T1.2
273	(Czech Republic) Karel Trneny	(Czech Republic) Michal Ernst	Ford F-150 Raptor	Workoutland ACCR Czech Team	T1+
274	(Poland) Magdalena Zając	(Poland) Jacek Czachor	Toyota Gazoo Racing Hilux	Proxcars TME Rally Team	T1.1
500	(Japan) Akira Miura	(France) Mayeul Barbet	Toyota Land Cruiser GR Sport	Toyota Auto Body	T2
501	(France) Ronald Basso	(France) Jean-Michel Polato	Toyota Land Cruiser GR Sport	Toyota Auto Body	T2
502	(Saudi Arabia) Ibrahim Almunha	(Saudi Arabia) Faisal Alsuwayh	Nissan Patrol	Ibrahim Almunha	T2

Entry list — Challenger (T3)

Note
– The "Dakar Legends" - competitors that participated in 10 or more Dakar events.
– The first time starters - "rookies".
– Competitors that were not able to start the race.

No.	Driver	Co-driver	Vehicle	Team
300	(Lithuania) Rokas Baciuška	(Spain) Oriol Vidal Montijano	Can-Am Maverick XRS Turbo	Red Bull Can-Am Factory Team
301	(Chile) Francisco López Contardo	(Chile) Juan Pablo Latrach Vinagre	Can-Am Maverick XRS Turbo	Red Bull Can-Am Factory Team
302	(Poland) Eryk Goczał	(Spain) Oriol Mena	MCE-5 Taurus T3 Max	Energylandia Rally Team
303	(United States) Mitch Guthrie	(United States) Kellon Walch	MCE-5 Taurus T3 Max	Red Bull Off-Road JR Team USA By BFG
304	(Poland) Marek Goczał	(Poland) Maciej Marton	MCE-5 Taurus T3 Max	Energylandia Rally Team
305	(United States) Austin Jones	(Brazil) Gustavo Gugelmin	Can-Am Maverick XRS Turbo	Red Bull Off-Road JR Team USA By BFG
306	(Spain) Cristina Gutiérrez	(Spain) Pablo Moreno Huete	MCE-5 Taurus T3 Max	Red Bull Off-Road JR Team USA By BFG
308	(Argentina) David Zille	(Argentina) Sebastian Cesana	Can-Am Maverick XRS Turbo	South Racing Can-Am
309	(Chile) Ignacio Casale	(Chile) Alvaro Leon	Yamaha X-Raid YXZ 1000R Turbo Prototype	X-Raid Yamaha Supported Team
310	(Poland) Michał Goczał	(Poland) Szymon Gospodarczyk	MCE-5 Taurus T3 Max	Energylandia Rally Team
311	(Saudi Arabia) Saleh Alsaif	(Qatar) Nasser Al-Kuwari	GRally OT3	Black Horse Team
312	(Argentina) Nicolás Cavigliasso	(Argentina) Valentina Pertegarini	MCE-5 Taurus T3 Max	Wevers Sport
314	(United Kingdom) Kris Meeke	(Netherlands) Wouter Rosegaar	GRally OT3	Grallyteam
315	(Portugal) Ricardo Porém	(Argentina) Agusto Sanz	MMP Can-Am T3 Rally Raid	MMP Compétition
317	(Portugal) Mário Franco	(Portugal) Daniel Jordão	Yamaha YXZ 1000R	Franco Sport
318	(Brazil) Marcelo Tiglia Gastaldi	(Brazil) Carlos Sachs	MCE-5 Taurus T3 Max	BBR Motorsport
321	(Germany) Annett Quandt	(Sweden) Annie Seel	Yamaha X-Raid YXZ 1000R Turbo Prototype	X-Raid Yamaha Supported Team
322	(Italy) Camelia Liparoti	(Guatemala) Rodolfo Guillioli	GRally OT3	Avid HPE & Cat Racing
324	(Spain) Pedro Manuel Peñate Muñoz	(Spain) Rosa Romero Font	Can-Am Maverick XRS Turbo	TH-Trucks Canarias Team
325	(Spain) Xavier Foj	(Spain) Joan Rubi Montserrat	AMS Oryx T3	Foj Motorsport
326	(Australia) Glenn Brinkman	(Australia) Dale Moscatt	PH-Sport Zephyr	PH-Sport
327	(France) Christophe Cresp	(France) Jean Brucy	MMP Can-Am T3	MMP Compétition
329	(Saudi Arabia) Dania Akeel	(France) Stéphane Duplé	MCE-5 Taurus T3 Max	South Racing Wevers Sport
330	(Spain) Jordi Segura Vidiella	(Spain) Sergi Brugué	Can-Am Maverick X3	JSV RACING TEAM
331	(United Arab Emirates) Khalid Aljafla	(Belarus) Andrei Rudnitski	Toyota Hilux Emirates	Aljafla Racing
332	(Colombia) Javier Vélez	(Argentina) Gaston Ariel Mattarucco	Can-Am Maverick X3	ADT Motowear - Drink Persé
333	(France) Benjamin Lattard	(France) Patrick Jimbert	MMP Can-Am T3	MMP Compétition
334	(Hungary) Pal Lonyai	(Italy) Filippo Ippolito	Yamaha X-Raid YXZ 1000R Turbo Prototype	X-Raid Yamaha Supported Team
336	(Netherlands) Paul Spierings	(Netherlands) Jan-Pieter van der Stelt	Can-Am Maverick X3	Dakar Team Spierings RaceArt
337	(Portugal) João Monteiro	(Portugal) Nuno Morais	Can-Am Maverick XRS Turbo	South Racing Can-Am
338	(Paraguay) Oscar Santos Peralta	(Brazil) Lourival Roldan	Can-Am Maverick X3	South Racing Can-Am
339	(Netherlands) Gert-Jan Van Der Valk	(Netherlands) Branco De Lange	Arcane T3	Arcane Racing
340	(Spain) Oscar Ral Verdu	(Spain) Xavier Blanco García	Can-Am Maverick X3	Buggy Masters Team
343	(Brazil) Gunter Hinkelmann	(Brazil) Fabrizio Bianchini	MCE-5 Taurus T3 Max	BBR Motorsport
345	(Austria) Freddy Fast	(Spain) Alexander Toril	Can-Am Maverick XRS Turbo	South Racing Can-Am
346	(Spain) Manuel Plaza Pérez	(Spain) Marta Plaza Vazquez	Can-Am Maverick X3	Sodicars Racing
347	(Austria) Lukas Lauda	(Germany) Stefan Henken	Can-Am Maverick X3	South Racing Can-Am
349	(Spain) Antonio Garcia Coma	(Spain) Aran Sol I Juanola	ORYX T3	ASM Motorsport
350	(Netherlands) Roger Grouwels	(Netherlands) Ronald van Nederpelt	Can-Am Maverick X3	Dakar Team Spierings RaceArt
351	(Netherlands) Edwin Opstelten	(Netherlands) Henny van Kouwen	Can-Am Maverick X3	Gaia Motorsports
352	(Netherlands) Lex Peters	(Netherlands) Wouter de Graaff	Arcane T3	Arcane Racing
369	(Netherlands) Jeffrey Otten	(Netherlands) Olaf Harmsen	Can-Am Maverick X3	Gaia Motorsports

Entry list — SSV (T4)

Note
– The "Dakar Legends" - competitors that participated in 10 or more Dakar events.
– The first time starters - "rookies".
– Competitors that were not able to start the race.

No.	Driver	Co-driver	Vehicle	Team	Assistance
400	(Portugal) João Ferreira	(Portugal) Filipe Palmeiro	Can-Am Maverick XRS Turbo	Can-Am Factory Team	South Racing Can-Am
401	(Japan) Shinsuke Umeda	(Italy) Maurizio Dominella	Polaris RZR Pro R	Xtreme Plus CST Polaris	Xtreme Plus CST Polaris
402	(Spain) Gerard Farrés	(Spain) Diego Ortega Gil	Can-Am Maverick XRS Turbo	South Racing Can-Am	South Racing Can-Am
404	(France) Claude Fournier	(France) Serge Gounon	Can-Am Maverick XRS Turbo	MMP	MMP
405	(France) Florent Vayssade	(France) Nicolas Rey	Polaris RZR Pro R	Sébastien Loeb Racing - Bardahl Team	Sébastien Loeb Racing - Bardahl Team
406	(Italy) Rebecca Busi	(Uruguay) Sergio Lafuente	Can-Am Maverick XRS Turbo	Onlyfans Racing	HRT Technology
407	(Spain) Eduardo Pons Sune	(Spain) Jaume Betriu	Can-Am Maverick XRS Turbo	South Racing Can-Am	South Racing Can-Am
408	(Saudi Arabia) Yasir Seaidan	(France) Adrien Metge	Can-Am Maverick XRS Turbo	MMP	South Racing Can-Am
409	(Ecuador) Sebastian Guayasamin	(Argentina) Fernando Matias Acosta	Can-Am Maverick XRS Turbo	FN Speed Team	FN Speed Team
410	(Italy) Michele Cinotto	(Italy) Alberto Bertoldi	Polaris RZR Pro R	Xtreme Plus CST Polaris	Xtreme Plus CST Polaris
411	(France) Xavier de Soultrait	(France) Martin Bonnet	Polaris RZR Pro R	Sébastien Loeb Racing - Bardahl Team	Sébastien Loeb Racing - Bardahl Team
412	(Spain) Juan Miguel Fidel Medero	(Spain) Javier Ventaja Cruz	Can-Am Maverick XRS Turbo	Sodicars Racing	Sodicars Racing
414	(Brazil) Cristiano Batista	(Spain) Fausto Mota	Can-Am Maverick XRS Turbo	South Racing Can-Am	South Racing Can-Am
415	(Brazil) Jorge Wagernfuhr	(Brazil) Humberto Ribeiro	Polaris RZR Pro R	Xtreme Plus CST Polaris	Xtreme Plus CST Polaris
416	(Brazil) Rodrigo Varela	(Brazil) Enio Bozzano Jr	Can-AM Maverick XRS Turbo	Team BBR	Team BBR
419	(United States) Sara Price	(United States) Jeremy Gray	Can-Am Maverick XRS Turbo	South Racing Can-Am	South Racing Can-Am
420	(Switzerland) Jérôme de Sadeleer	(France) Michaël Metge	Can-Am Maverick XRS Turbo	MMP	MMP
421	(France) Eric Croquelois	(France) Anthony Pes	Can-Am Maverick XRS Turbo	Drag'on	Drag'on
424	(France) Benoît Lepietre	(France) Benoît Bonnefoi	Can-Am Maverick XRS Turbo	BTR	BTR
425	(France) Jérémie Renou	(France) Nicolas Larroquet	Can-Am Maverick XRS Turbo	Ydeo Compétition	Ydeo Compétition
426	(Lithuania) Emilija Gelažninkienė	(Lithuania) Arūnas Gelažninkas	Can-Am Maverick XRS Turbo	Rentway Dakar Team	Rentway Dakar Team
427	(Netherlands) Sander Derikx	(Netherlands) Ruud Vollebregt	Can-Am Maverick XRS Turbo	QFF Timola Racing	QFF
428	(France) William Grarre	(France) Julien Vincent	Can-Am Maverick XRS Turbo	Thor Team Horizon Off-Road	BTR
429	(Italy) Cristina Giampaoli	(Argentina) Ricardo Adrian Torlaschi	Can-Am Maverick XRS Turbo	TC Racing	TC Racing
430	(Poland) Grzegorz Brochocki	(Poland) Grzegorz Komar	Can-Am Maverick XRS Turbo	Overlimit	Overlimit
431	(Spain) Jose Vidaña	(Spain) Dani Camara Ordonez	Can-Am Maverick XRS Turbo	Pedrega Team	Pedrega Team
432	(Saudi Arabia) Maha Hamali	(Poland) Marcin Ludwik Pasek	Can-Am Maverick XRS Turbo	R-X Sport	Dark Horse Team
433	(Netherlands) Jan-Willem van Mourik	(Netherlands) Eduard Hillebrand	Can-Am Maverick XRS Turbo	DeliveryBike Dakar Team	DeliveryBike Dakar Team
434	(Spain) Domingo Román Pardos	(Spain) Oscar Bravo Garcia	Polaris RZR Pro R	TH-Trucks Team	TH-Trucks Team
435	(Spain) Ricardo Ramilo Suarez	(Spain) Marc Sola Terradellas	Can-Am Maverick XRS Turbo	Scuderia Ramilo Rodamoto	Scuderia Ramilo Rodamoto
436	(Mexico) Daniel González Reina	(Mexico) Jorge Hernandez Calva	Polaris RZR Pro R	Geek Racing / TH-Trucks	TH-Trucks Team
437	(Netherlands) Martijn van den Broek	(Netherlands) Jan Paul van der Poel	Can-Am Maverick XRS Turbo	Van Ham Racing / QFF	QFF
438	(Spain) Juan Font Guixaro	(Spain) Borja Rodriguez Rodriguez	Can-Am Maverick XRS Turbo	Scuderia Ramilo Rodamoto	Scuderia Ramilo Rodamoto
440	(Netherlands) Andre Thewessen	(Ukraine) Dmytro Tsyro	Can-Am Maverick XRS Turbo	Pedrega Team	Pedrega Team
441	(Spain) Rafa Muñoz Camara	(Spain) Jose Mata Rubiejo	Can-Am Maverick XRS Turbo	Pedrega Team	Pedrega Team
442	(Italy) Enrico Gaspari	(Argentina) Facundo Jaton	Polaris RZR Pro R	TH-Trucks Team	TH-Trucks Team

Entry list — Trucks

Note
– The "Dakar Legends" - competitors that participated in 10 or more Dakar events.
– The first time starters - "rookies".
– Late entries.
– Competitors that were not able to start the race.

No.	Driver	Co-driver	Technician	Vehicle	Team	Class
600	(Netherlands) Janus van Kasteren	(Poland) Darek Rodewald	(Netherlands) Marcel Snijders	Iveco PowerStar	Boss Machinery Team De Rooy Iveco FPT	T5.1
601	(Czech Republic) Martin Macík Jr.	(Czech Republic) František Tomášek	(Czech Republic) David Švanda	Iveco PowerStar	MM Technology	T5.1
602	(Czech Republic) Aleš Loprais	(Czech Republic) Jaroslav Valtr Jr	(Czech Republic) Jiří Stross	Praga V4S DKR	Instaforex Loprais Praga	T5.1
603	(Netherlands) Mitchel van den Brink	(Netherlands) Jarno van de Pol	(Spain) Moises Torrallardona	Iveco PowerStar	Eurol Rallysport	T5.1
604	(Czech Republic) Jaroslav Valtr	(Czech Republic) Rene Kilian	(Czech Republic) David Kilian	Tatra Phoenix	Tatra Buggyra ZM Racing Team	T5.1
605	(Netherlands) Pascal de Baar	(Netherlands) Giso Verschoor	(Czech Republic) Tomáš Šikola	Tatra Buggyra EVO3	Tatra Buggyra ZM Racing Team	T5.1
606	(Netherlands) Martin van den Brink	(Netherlands) Rijk Mouw	(Netherlands) Jan van der Vaet	Iveco T-Way	Eurol Rallysport	T5.1
607	(Netherlands) Richard de Groot	(Netherlands) Jan Hulsebosch	(Netherlands) Martijn Johannes Martinus van Rooij	Iveco Strator	Firemen Dakar Team	T5.1
608	(Netherlands) Vick Versteijnen	(Netherlands) Andre van der Sande	(Netherlands) Teun van Dal	Iveco PowerStar	Versteijnen Truck Racing	T5.1
609	(Japan) Teruhito Sugawara	(Japan) Hirokazu Somemiya	(Japan) Yuji Mochizuki	Hino 600-Hybrid	Hino Team Sugawara	T5.1
610	(Italy) Claudio Bellina	(Italy) Bruno Gotti	(Italy) Marco Arnoletti	Iveco PowerStar	MM Technology	T5.1
611	(Netherlands) Gerrit Zuurmond	(Netherlands) Tjeerd Van Ballegooy	(Netherlands) Klaas Kwakkel	MAN TGA	Stichting Rainbow Truck Team	T5.1
613	(Lithuania) Vaidotas Paškevičius	(Lithuania) Gytis Gaspariūnas	(Lithuania) Albert Veliamovic	Tatra Jamal	Fesh Fesh Team	T5.1
614	(Netherlands) Egbert Wingens	(Netherlands) Gerard van Veenendaal	(Germany) Philipp Rettig	MAN 4x4	Team Boucou Assistance	T5.2
615	(Netherlands) Gert Huzink	(Netherlands) Rob Buursen	(Netherlands) Martin Roesink	Renault C460 Hybrid	Jongbloed Dakar Team	T5.1
616	(Belgium) Igor Bouwens	(Senegal) Syndiely Wade	(Belgium) Ulrich Boerboom	Iveco T-Way	Gregoor Racing Team	T5.1
617	(Netherlands) Ben de Groot	(Netherlands) Govert Boogaard	(Netherlands) Ad Hofmans	Iveco PowerStar	De Groot Sport	T5.1
618	(Netherlands) Anja Van Loon	(Netherlands) Marije van Ettekoven	(Netherlands) Floor Maten	Iveco PowerStar	Ladies Team De Rooy Iveco FPT	T5.1
619	(Andorra) Albert Llovera	(Andorra) Margot Llobera	(Spain) Marc Torres	Ford Cargo 4X4	Fesh Fesh Team	T5.1
620	(Netherlands) William de Groot	(Netherlands) Tom Brekelmans	(Netherlands) Jos van der Pas	Iveco PowerStar	De Groot Sport	T5.1
622	(Netherlands) Michiel Becx	(Netherlands) Wulfert van Ginkel	(Netherlands) Edwin Kuijpers	Iveco PowerStar	Becx Competition Team de Rooy FPT	T5.1
623	(Spain) Pep Sabaté	(Spain) Jordi Montaner Busquets	(Spain) Pol Tibau Roura	Iveco 4X4 DRNL	Bahrain Raid Xtreme	T5.1
624	(Belgium) Steven Rotsaert	(Belgium) Benny Raes	(Belgium) Lins Didier	MAN TGX	Overdrive Racing	T5.1
625	(Spain) Alberto Herrero	(Spain) Susana Hernando Inés	(Spain) Mario Rodríguez Sastre	Scania 4x4	TH-Trucks Team	T5.1
626	(Czech Republic) Daniel Stiblik	(Czech Republic) Lukáš Kvasnica	(Czech Republic) Jiří Tomec	Tatra Phoenix	Tatra Buggyra ZM Racing Team	T5.1
627	(France) Philippe Pedeche	(France) Philippe Perry	(France) Jérémie Demarty	DAF 75CF	Team Boucou Assistance	T5.1
628	(Italy) Gianandrea Pellegrinelli	(Italy) Giulio Minelli	(Italy) Carlo Galdini	Iveco PowerStar	MM Technology	T5.1
629	(Germany) Michael Baumann	(Germany) Philipp Beier	(Germany) Sebastian Lindner	MAN TGA	Q Motorsport Team	T5.1
630	(Belgium) Dave Berghmans	(France) Sam Koopmann	(Belgium) Bob Geens	Iveco Trakker	Overdrive Racing	T5.1
631	(Spain) Jordi Esteve Oro	(Spain) Francisco José Pardo Benito	(Spain) Raul Arteaga Rodriguez	DAF Trucks	X Rally Team	T5.1
632	(France) Guillaume Manelphe	(France) Jean-François Cazères	(France) Nicolas Falloux	Iveco Trakker	Team Boucou Assistance	T5.1
633	(Saudi Arabia) Tariq Alrammah	(Algeria) Samir Benbekhti	(United Kingdom) John Cockburn	Volvo	STA Competition	T5.1
634	(France) Thomas Robineau	(France) Sylvain Laliche	(France) Jérémie Gimbre	Renault TGA11	Toyota Auto Body	T5.2
635	(Czech Republic) Michal Valtr	(Slovakia) Jaroslav Miškolci	(Czech Republic) Radim Kaplanek	Iveco PowerStar	Valtr Racing Team	T5.1
636	(Italy) Cesare Rickler	(Italy) Aldo de Lorenzo	Dario de Lorenzo	MAN TGS	TH-Trucks Team	T5.2
637	(Hungary) Miklós Kovács	(Hungary) Péter Czeglédi	(Hungary) László Ács	Scania Qualisport Hyena	Qualisport Racing	T5.1
638	(Belgium) Didier Monseu	(Belgium) Charly Gotlib	(Belgium) Edouard Fraipont	MAN TGA 2.480 6x6	Bahrain Raid Xtreme	T5.2
639	(Spain) Manuel Borrero Gomez	(Spain) Emilio Fiz del Teso	(Spain) Juan Francisco Silva Pineiro	MAN TGS	Tibau Team	T5.2
640	(Hungary) Norbert Szalai	(France) Frederic Becart	(Slovakia) Pavel Fasko	MAN TGS	Team SSP	T5.2
641	(Hungary) Zsolt Darázsi	(France) Pierre Calmon	(Hungary) Tibor Lener	MAN TGA	Team SSP	T5.2
642	(Spain) Alberto Alonso Romero	(Spain) Alejandro Mozuelos Del Rio	(Spain) Gustavo Ibas Perez	DAF 85CF	Sodicars Racing	T5.2
643	(Czech Republic) Dušan Randýsek	(France) Victor Bouchwalder	(France) Laurent Lalanne	MAN TGA	Team SSP	T5.2
644	(Spain) Francesc Ester Fernandez	(Spain) Javier Jacoste	(Spain) Jose María Fontdevila Boloix	MAN TGA	TH-Trucks Team	T5.2
645	(France) Marco Piana	(France) Paco Fernandez	(Italy) David Giovannetti	GINAF	Xtremeplus CST Polaris	T5.2
646	(France) Sébastien Fargeas1	(Portugal) Armando Loureiro	(France) Eric Simonin	MAN TGA	Team Boucou Assistance	T5.2
648	(Belgium) Dave Ingels	(Netherlands) Johannes Schotanus	(Germany) Jens Scholer	MAN TGA	Q Motorsport Team	T5.2
651	(Algeria) Ahmed Benbekhti	(France) Bruno Seillet	(France) Mickaël Fauvel	MAN TGA 480 4x4	Rebellion Racing	T5.2

Entry list — Classics

Note
– The "Dakar Legends" - competitors that participated in 10 or more Dakar events.
– The first time starters - "rookies".
– Competitors that were not able to start the race.

No.	Driver	Co-driver	Technician	Vehicle	Team	Class
700	(Spain) Juan Morera	(Spain) Lidia Ruba	No technician	Porsche 959	Moma Bikes Raid Team	87-96 Moderate Average
701	(Italy) Paolo Bedeschi	(Italy) Daniele Bottallo	No technician	Toyota BJ71	Tecnosport	87-96 Intermediate Average
702	(Italy) Lorenzo Traglio	(Italy) Rudy Briani	No technician	Nissan Pathfinder	Tecnosport	+97 Intermediate Average
703	(Belgium) Dirk Van Rompuy	(Spain) Luis Barbero Garcia	No technician	Toyota HDJ 80	TH-Trucks VR Racing	87-96 Moderate Average
704	(France) Pascal Lebrun	(France) Sébastien Dubois	No technician	Toyota HDJ 80	Team Cap179	87-96 Moderate Average
705	(Spain) Francisco Javier Benavente	(Spain) Rafael Benavente Del Rio	No technician	Nissan Terrano	Recinsa Sport	87-96 Moderate Average
708	(Netherlands) Sebastiaan Klaassen	(Netherlands) Puck Klaassen	No technician	Porsche Martiny	Nantes Prestige Autos	-86 Moderate Average
709	(Poland) Łukasz Zoll	(Poland) Michal Zoll	No technician	Porsche 924	Dext P-Rally	-86 Moderate Average
710	(Italy) Stefano Calzi	(Italy) Umberto Fiori	No technician	Mitsubishi Pajero	Motortecnica Racing Team	87-96 High Average
711	(Spain) Asier Duarte Rodriguez	(Spain) Raquel Arranz	No technician	Toyota HDJ 80	TH-Trucks Team	87-96 Moderate Average
712	(Czech Republic) Barbora Holická	(Czech Republic) Lucie Engová	No technician	Citroën 2CV	Czech Samurais	-86 Low Average
714	(Czech Republic) Ondřej Klymčiw	(Czech Republic) Josef Broz	No technician	Škoda 130LR	Klymčiw Racing	87-96 Moderate Average
715	(Portugal) Joao Antonio De Almeida E Sousa Costa	(Portugal) Luis Miguel Goncalves Calvao	No technician	UMM Alter 4x4	TH-Trucks Team	87-96 Moderate Average
716	(Poland) Dominik Ben	(Poland) Katarzyna Malicka	No technician	Suzuki Vitara	Coco Loco	+97 Intermediate Average
717	(Germany) Maximilian Loder	(Germany) Laurence Loder	No technician	Puch 280GE	Völkel Dakar Team	-86 Moderate Average
718	(Italy) Luciano Carcheri	(Italy) Fabrizia Pons	No technician	Isuzu Vehicross	Tecnosport	87-96 Low Average
719	(Italy) Filippo Giorgio Colnaghi	(Italy) Stefano Davide Fabiano	No technician	Nissan Terrano	Tecnosport	87-96 Moderate Average
720	(France) Michel Blanc	(France) Frédéric Benedetti	No technician	Renault 4L	4lpine Retro	-86 Low Average
721	(Spain) Vincent González	(Spain) Albert Casabona Vilaseca	No technician	Toyota Land Cruiser 90	TH-Trucks Team	+97 Intermediate Average
722	(Italy) Andrea Belometti	(Italy) Luigi Derossi	No technician	Nissan Patrol	Desert Endurance Motorsport	+97 Intermediate Average
723	(France) François-Xavier Bourgois	(France) Patrice Auzet	No technician	Peugeot 504 Coupé	Team Boucou	-86 Intermediate Average
724	(Mozambique) Paulo Sérgio Da Silva Oliveira	(Portugal) Arcélio Couto	No technician	UMM Alter 4x4	TH-Trucks Team	87-96 Moderate Average
725	(Belgium) Pieter Peerlings	(Belgium) Sam Teugels	No technician	Porsche 924	924 Turbo Team	-86 Intermediate Average
727	(Italy) Giulio Bertolli	(Italy) Renato Rickler Del Mare	No technician	Mitsubishi Pajero	R Team	87-96 Moderate Average
728	(Croatia) Juraj Šebalj	(Croatia) Ivan Vidaković	No technician	Nissan Terrano II	Tecnosport	87-96 Moderate Average
729	(France) Lionel Guy	(France) Johnny Mauduit	No technician	Land Rover Range Rover	Team Capôsud	87-96 Moderate Average
730	(France) François Abrial	(France) Cécile Abrial	No technician	Toyota HDJ 80	Team SSP	87-96 Moderate Average
731	(Spain) Marcel Quiros	(Spain) Joan Cairó i Ferrer	No technician	Lada Niva	BXS Motorsport	87-96 Low Average
733	(Germany) Panos Meyer	(Germany) Martin Bendig-Kreutzer	No technician	Mercedes 280GE	Völkel Dakar Team	-86 Moderate Average
734	(Italy) Stefano Sinibaldi	(Italy) Simona Morosi	No technician	Mitsubishi Pajero Evolution	R Team	+97 Intermediate Average
735	(France) Hervé Solandt	(France) Brice Laborie-Brondino	No technician	Land Rover Range Rover	RSO	87-96 Moderate Average
736	(Poland) Michał Horodeński	(Poland) Arkadiusz Sałaciński	No technician	Toyota HDJ 80	Toyota Team Classic	87-96 Intermediate Average
737	(Poland) Tomasz Staniszewski	(Poland) Stanisław Postawka	No technician	Porsche 924	P-Rally	-86 Moderate Average
738	(Netherlands) Jaap Bolk	(Netherlands) Twan Vollebregt	No technician	Mitsubishi Pajero Evolution	Bolk Dakar Rallyteam	+97 High Average
739	(Spain) Daniel Albero Puig	(Spain) Jose Luis Serra Roca	No technician	Toyota Land Cruiser 90	Team Un Diabético en el Dakar	+97 Intermediate Average
740	(Spain) Matías Rodríguez Martín	(Spain) Sandra Gausch Planells	No technician	Lada Niva	BXS Motorsport	87-96 Low Average
741	(Italy) Damiano Lipani	(Italy) Stefano Crementieri	No technician	Mitsubishi Pajero Evolution	R Team	+97 Intermediate Average
742	(South Africa) Katherine Lovemore	(South Africa) Stephen Lovemore	No technician	Toyota HDJ 80	Dreamy & the Pap Snoek	87-96 Low Average
743	(France) Thierry Valtat	(France) Guillaume Gelée	No technician	Toyota HZJ 78	Compagnie Saharienne 2024	87-96 Low Average
744	(United Kingdom) Andrew Graham	(United Kingdom) Gavin Neate	No technician	Land Rover Defender 90	Allisport	-86 Moderate Average
745	(France) Dominique Durand	(France) Raphael Vial	No technician	Toyota HDJ 80	Team SSP	87-96 Moderate Average
746	(Italy) Ugo Bullesi	(Italy) Myriam Manzoni	No technician	Mitsubishi Pajero	Befuel Bombelli Team	87-96 Intermediate Average
747	(France) Teddy Delmonico	(France) Florian Garnier	No technician	Toyota HDJ 100	TFSL Racing	+97 High Average
748	(Italy) Giuliano Bergo	(Italy) Robert Blaas	No technician	Mitsubishi Pajero Evolution	R Team	+97 Intermediate Average
749	(Argentina) Jorge Pérez Companc	(Argentina) Jose Maria Volta	No technician	Toyota HDJ 80	Madpanda Motorsport	87-96 Intermediate Average
750	(Switzerland) Mathieu Kurzen	(Switzerland) Alexandre Fatio	No technician	Mitsubishi Pajero	Geco Classic	87-96 Low Average
751	(France) Stéphane Docher	(France) Lionel Balandreaud	No technician	Toyota HDJ 80	TFSL Racing	87-96 Intermediate Average
752	(France) Georges Garcia	(France) François Beziac	No technician	Land Rover Discovery	Chancellor Team New Zealand	87-96 Moderate Average
753	(South Africa) Adriaan Botma	(South Africa) Riaan Botma	No technician	Toyota HDJ 80	Midstream Oil	87-96 Intermediate Average
754	(Spain) Sergi Fernández García Acc	(Spain) Pablo Benavente	No technician	Mitsubishi L200	Pedrega Team	+97 Intermediate Average
755	(Germany) Jörg Sand	(Germany) Patrick Diemer	No technician	Mercedes 280GE	Völkel Dakar Team	-86 Moderate Average
756	(Italy) Stefano Picasso	(Italy) Gianluca Biondi	No technician	Suzuki Vitara	Desert Endurance Motorsport	87-96 Low Average
757	(Switzerland) Daniel Vetter	(Switzerland) Anton Frutiger	No technician	Toyota KZJ73	Team Desertcruiser	+97 Intermediate Average
758	(Germany) Frank Uwe Juergen Thiel	(Germany) Hartmut Weigelt	No technician	Toyota LJ70	Montana Racing	87-96 Moderate Average
759	(France) Frederic Larre	(France) Jérémy Athimon	No technician	Porsche 959	Lagune - Nantes Prestige Autos	87-96 Moderate Average
760	(France) Olivier Delrieu	(France) Christophe Chabeuf	No technician	Toyota HZJ 78	Compagnie Saharienne 2024	87-96 Low Average
761	(Italy) Marco Ernesto Leva	(Italy) Alexia Giugni	No technician	Mitsubishi Pajero	R Team	87-96 Moderate Average
762	(Czech Republic) Jan Vins	(Czech Republic) Tomáš Hovorka	No technician	Mitsubishi Pajero	Enjoy Motorsport	87-96 Moderate Average
763	(Italy) Giorgio Ciresola	(Slovenia) Ziga Colja	No technician	Toyota Land Cruiser 90	Desert Endurance Motorsport	+97 Intermediate Average
764	(France) Maxence Gublin	(France) Anthony Sousa	No technician	Land Rover Defender 110	Bolides Racing	87-96 Moderate Average
765	(Spain) Lorenzo Fluxá Domene	(Spain) Xavi Ribas Font	No technician	Toyota Land Cruiser 90	LJS Racing Team	87-96 Moderate Average
766	(France) Michaël Denis	(France) Philippe Garabeuf	No technician	Toyota HZJ 78	Compagnie Saharienne 2024	87-96 Low Average
767	(Spain) Amadeo Roige Bragulat	(Spain) Jorge Toral	No technician	Toyota KZJ95	Pedrega Team	87-96 Moderate Average
768	(Spain) Carlos Santaolalla Milla	(Spain) Jan Rosa i Viñas	No technician	Toyota Land Cruiser	Factorytub	87-96 Moderate Average
900	(Italy) Marco Giannecchini	(Italy) Luca Macrini	(Portugal) Alexandre Manuel Azenha de Freitas	Iveco Eurocargo	R Team	87-96 Low Average
901	(France) Pierre-Louis Quemin	(France) Olivier Guillory	(France) Antoine Margall	Mercedes 2636	Team SSP	87-96 Moderate Average
902	(France) Frank Puchouau	(Spain) Enric Segura	(France) Dorian Bardeau	Renault Kerax	Team Boucou Competition	+97 Moderate Average
903	(Netherlands) Janus Van Kasteren Sr.	(Netherlands) Toine Verkooijen	(Netherlands) Herman Keijsers	DAF 3300	Classic Team De Rooy	87-96 Moderate Average
904	(Italy) Ermanno De Angelis	(Switzerland) Annunziata Del Gaudio	(Italy) Andrea Cadei	Iveco ACM 80-17	Desert Endurance Motorsport	87-96 Moderate Average
905	(Spain) Ignacio Corcuera	(Spain) David Naveira Hernandez	(Spain) Fernando Garcia Sagasta	Mercedes Unimog	Equipo Euskadi 4X4	-86 Low Average
906	(Italy) Corrado Pattono	(Italy) Piermarco Acerni	(Italy) Gianluca Ianni	MAN 18-285	Mototecnica Racing Team	+97 Moderate Average
907	(Germany) Thomas Wolthaus	(Germany) Bastian Klausing	(Germany) Georg Gattinger	Mercedes 2636 A 6X6	Völkel Dakar Team	-86 Low Average
908	(Germany) Christian Ruppert	(Germany) Ursula Ruppert	(Germany) Matias Ruppert	Mercedes 1735 SK/AK	Ruppert Motorsport	87-96 Low Average
910	(Italy) Giuseppe Simonato	(Italy) Alessio Bentivoglio	(Italy) Monica Buonamano	Iveco Magirus	Tecnosport	87-96 Moderate Average
911	(Spain) Rafael Lesmes Suarez	(Spain) Jose Luis Ruano Garcia	(Spain) Tabatha Romon	Mercedes 1844 AK	TH-Trucks Dakar Por la Vida	87-96 Low Average
912	(Germany) Daniel Schatz	(Germany) Lina van de Mars	(Germany) Fabian Stauner	Mercedes 22636 A 6X6	Völkel Dakar Team	-86 Low Average
913	(Spain) Jaime Martinez Canteli	(Spain) Nekane Abin Bardeci	(Spain) Santiago Díaz de Cerio Aristimuno	Mercedes 2636 A 6X6	TH-Trucks Team	87-96 Low Average
915	(France) Alexandre Lemay	(France) Fabien Lecaplain	(France) Jean-Baptiste Lecot	MAN LL90	Team HoleShot Compétition	+97 Low Average

Entry list — Mission 1000

Note
– The "Dakar Legends" - competitors that participated in 10 or more Dakar events.
– The first time starters - "rookies".
– Competitors that were not able to start the race.

No.	Driver	Co-driver	Technician	Vehicle	Team	Class
1000	(France) Sylvain Espinasse	No co-driver	No technician	Tacita Discanto DKR	Tacita Formula Corsa	M1000 - Bike
1001	(Italy) Oscar Polli	No co-driver	No technician	Tacita Discanto DKR	Tacita Formula Corsa	M1000 - Bike
1002	(France) Willy Jobard	No co-driver	No technician	Arctic Leopard E-XE880 Rally	Arctic Leopard Factory Racing	M1000 - Bike
1003	(China) Wenmin Su	No co-driver	No technician	Arctic Leopard E-XE880 Rally	Arctic Leopard Factory Racing	M1000 - Bike
1004	(China) Gang Jun Cai	No co-driver	No technician	Arctic Leopard E-XE880 Rally	Arctic Leopard Factory Racing	M1000 - Bike
1005	(Spain) Francisco Jose Gomez Pallas	No co-driver	No technician	Bat Power Racing	Green Power Race	M1000 - Bike
1010	(Netherlands) Dick Zuurmond	(Netherlands) Simon Koetsier	No technician	Volkswagen Amarok H2	Stichting Rainbow Truck Team	M1000 - Car
1020	(United States) Jamie Campbell	(Argentina) Bruno Jacomy	No technician	HySE-X1	HySE	M1000 - SSV
1021	(France) Jean-Michel Paulhe	(France) Gauthier Gibert	No technician	Can-Am Maverick X3 XRC Hydrogen	Team The Desert Tigers	M1000 - SSV
1030	(Spain) Jordi Juvanteny	(Spain) José Luis Criado	(Spain) Xavier Ribas	MAN TGA 26.480	KH7-Ecovergy Team	M1000 - Truck

== Stages ==
The 2024 Dakar route was revealed on 20 November 2023, totaling 7,891 km (4,903 mi), and consisting of 4,727 km (2,937 mi) special stages. The race features a new two-day marathon stage, where all participants will need to stop at the nearest bivouac after 4pm. There will be 8 bivouacs setup, with drivers having no contact with their teams, but allowed to work on other vehicles.

Stage	Date		Start	Finish	Total/Special
Prologue	Friday	January 5, 2024	Al-'Ula	Al-'Ula	158 km / 28 km
1	Saturday	January 6, 2024	Al-'Ula	Al Henakiyah	532 km / 405 km
2	Sunday	January 7, 2024	Al Henakiyah	Ad Dawadimi	662 km / 470 km
3	Monday	January 8, 2024	Ad Dawadimi	Al Salamiya	733 km / 440 km
4	Tuesday	January 9, 2024	Al Salamiya	Al-Hofuf	631 km / 299 km
5	Wednesday	January 10, 2024	Al-Hofuf	Shaybah	727 km / 118 km
6 (Marathon)	Thursday-Friday	January 11-12, 2024	Shaybah	Shaybah	766 km / 532 km
-	Saturday	January 13, 2024	Riyadh		Rest day
7	Sunday	January 14, 2024	Riyadh	Ad Dawadimi	873 km / 483 km
8	Monday	January 15, 2024	Ad Dawadimi	Ha'il	678 km / 458 km
9	Tuesday	January 16, 2024	Ha'il	Al-'Ula	639 km / 417 km
10	Wednesday	January 17, 2024	Al-'Ula	Al-'Ula	609 km / 371 km
11	Thursday	January 18, 2024	Al-'Ula	Yanbu	587 km / 480 km
12	Friday	January 19, 2024	Yanbu	Yanbu	328 km / 175 km

== Stage winners ==
Stage	Bikes	Quads	Cars	Challenger (T3)	SSV (T4)	Trucks	Classics	Mission 1000
Prologue	(Spain) Tosha Schareina	(Argentina) Franciso Moreno Flores	(Sweden) Mattias Ekström	(Poland) Eryk Goczał	(France) Xavier de Soultrait	(Netherlands) Janus van Kasteren	(Spain) Juan Morera	Did not participate
Stage 1	(Botswana) Ross Branch	(Brazil) Marcelo Medeiros	(Belgium) Guillaume De Mévius	(Poland) Marek Goczał (Note: Eryk Goczał originally won the stage, but was disqualified on the rest day following Stage 6 for using an unauthorised carbon clutch.)	(Brazil) Rodrigo Varela	(Netherlands) Janus van Kasteren	(Italy) Lorenzo Traglio	(France) Sylvain Espinasse
Stage 2	(Chile) José Ignacio Cornejo	(Brazil) Marcelo Medeiros	(France) Stéphane Peterhansel	(United States) Mitch Guthrie	(Spain) Gerard Farrés	(Netherlands) Janus van Kasteren	(Spain) Juan Morera	(France) Willy Jobard
Stage 3	(Argentina) Kevin Benavides	(France) Alexandre Giroud	(Brazil) Lucas Moraes	(United States) Mitch Guthrie	(Saudi Arabia) Yasir Seaidan	(Czech Republic) Martin Macík	(Spain) Carlos Santaolalla	(Spain) Jordi Juvanteny
Stage 4	(Chile) José Ignacio Cornejo	(Argentina) Manuel Andújar	(France) Sébastien Loeb	(Chile) Ignacio Casale	(Portugal) João Ferreira	(Netherlands) Janus van Kasteren	(Spain) Carlos Santaolalla	(China) Wenmin Su
Stage 5	(Chile) Pablo Quintanilla	(Brazil) Marcelo Medeiros	(Qatar) Nasser Al-Attiyah	(Chile) Francisco López Contardo	(France) Xavier de Soultrait	(Czech Republic) Martin Macík	(Czech Republic) Ondřej Klymčiw	No Stage
Stage 6	(France) Adrien Van Beveren	(France) Alexandre Giroud	(France) Sébastien Loeb	(Spain) Cristina Gutiérrez	(France) Xavier de Soultrait	(Czech Republic) Martin Macík	(Spain) Carlos Santaolalla	(France) Jean Michel Paulhe
Stage 7	(Chile) José Ignacio Cornejo	(France) Alexandre Giroud	(France) Sébastien Loeb	(United States) Mitch Guthrie	(Portugal) João Ferreira	(Czech Republic) Martin Macík	(Spain) Carlos Santaolalla	(Spain) Jordi Juvanteny
Stage 8	(Argentina) Kevin Benavides	(Argentina) Manuel Andújar	(Sweden) Mattias Ekström	(Saudi Arabia) Saleh Alsaif	(Portugal) João Ferreira	(Netherlands) Mitchel van den Brink	(Italy) Lorenzo Traglio	(China) Wenmin Su
Stage 9	(France) Adrien Van Beveren	(France) Alexandre Giroud	(France) Sébastien Loeb	(Argentina) Nicolás Cavigliasso	(Brazil) Cristiano Batista	(Netherlands) Gert Huzink	(Spain) Carlos Santaolalla	(France) Jean Michel Paulhe
Stage 10	(United States) Ricky Brabec	(Argentina) Manuel Andújar	(France) Guerlain Chicherit	(Brazil) Marcelo Gastaldi	(United States) Sara Price	(Netherlands) Gert Huzink	(Spain) Carlos Santaolalla	(Spain) Jordi Juvanteny
Stage 11	(Botswana) Ross Branch	(France) Alexandre Giroud	(France) Guerlain Chicherit	(Argentina) Nicolás Cavigliasso	(Switzerland) Jérôme de Sadeleer	(Czech Republic) Aleš Loprais	(Italy) Lorenzo Traglio	(China) Wenmin Su
Stage 12	(Argentina) Kevin Benavides	(France) Alexandre Giroud	(France) Sébastien Loeb	(Brazil) Marcelo Gastaldi	(France) Florent Vayssade	(Czech Republic) Aleš Loprais	(Spain) Carlos Santaolalla	(Spain) Jordi Juvanteny
Rally Winners	(United States) Ricky Brabec	(Argentina) Manuel Andújar	(Spain) Carlos Sainz	(Spain) Cristina Gutiérrez	(France) Xavier de Soultrait	(Czech Republic) Martin Macík	(Spain) Carlos Santaolalla	(Spain) Jordi Juvanteny

== Stage results ==
=== Bikes ===
	Stage result					General classification				
Stage	Pos	Competitor	Make	Time	Gap	Pos	Competitor	Make	Time	Gap
Prologue	1	(Spain) Tosha Schareina	Honda	00:17:35		1	(Spain) Tosha Schareina	Honda	00:17:35	
Prologue	2	(Australia) Daniel Sanders	Gas Gas	00:17:47	00:00:12	2	(Australia) Daniel Sanders	Gas Gas	00:17:47	00:00:12
Prologue	3	(Botswana) Ross Branch	Hero	00:17:54	00:00:19	3	(Botswana) Ross Branch	Hero	00:17:54	00:00:19
Stage 1	1	(Botswana) Ross Branch	Hero	04:56:01		1	(Botswana) Ross Branch	Hero	05:13:55	
Stage 1	2	(United States) Ricky Brabec	Honda	05:06:55	00:10:54	2	(United States) Ricky Brabec	Honda	05:25:49	00:11:54
Stage 1	3	(United States) Mason Klein	Kove	05:07:20	00:11:19	3	(United States) Mason Klein	Kove	05:25:53	00:11:58
Stage 2	1	(Chile) José Ignacio Cornejo	Honda	04:24:17		1	(Botswana) Ross Branch	Hero	09:50:05	
Stage 2	2	(Argentina) Luciano Benavides	Husqvarna	04:30:16	00:05:59	2	(Chile) José Ignacio Cornejo	Honda	09:53:00	00:02:55
Stage 2	3	(Chile) Pablo Quintanilla	Honda	04:30:29	00:06:12	3	(United States) Ricky Brabec	Honda	09:57:20	00:07:15
Stage 3	1	(Argentina) Kevin Benavides	KTM	04:39:28		1	(Botswana) Ross Branch	Hero	14:32:51	
Stage 3	2	(United States) Ricky Brabec	Honda	04:40:39	00:01:11	2	(Chile) José Ignacio Cornejo	Honda	14:36:02	00:03:11
Stage 3	3	(France) Adrien Van Beveren	Honda	04:42:19	00:02:51	3	(United States) Ricky Brabec	Honda	14:37:59	00:05:08
Stage 4	1	(Chile) José Ignacio Cornejo	Honda	02:51:11		1	(Chile) José Ignacio Cornejo	Honda	17:27:13	
Stage 4	2	(United States) Ricky Brabec	Honda	02:54:10	00:02:59	2	(Botswana) Ross Branch	Hero	17:28:28	00:01:15
Stage 4	3	(Argentina) Kevin Benavides	KTM	02:54:29	00:03:18	3	(United States) Ricky Brabec	Honda	17:32:09	00:04:56
Stage 5	1	(Chile) Pablo Quintanilla	Honda	01:32:53		1	(Botswana) Ross Branch	Hero	19:05:03	
Stage 5	2	(France) Adrien Van Beveren	Honda	01:33:30	00:00:37	2	(Chile) José Ignacio Cornejo	Honda	19:06:17	00:01:14
Stage 5	3	(Australia) Toby Price	KTM	01:34:32	00:01:39	3	(United States) Ricky Brabec	Honda	19:08:50	00:03:47
Stage 6	1	(France) Adrien Van Beveren	Honda	07:57:29		1	(United States) Ricky Brabec	Honda	27:11:21	
Stage 6	2	(Australia) Toby Price	KTM	08:01:42	00:04:13	2	(Botswana) Ross Branch	Hero	27:12:12	00:00:51
Stage 6	3	(United States) Ricky Brabec	Honda	08:02:31	00:05:02	3	(France) Adrien Van Beveren	Honda	27:20:42	00:09:21
Stage 7	1	(Chile) José Ignacio Cornejo	Honda	05:18:33		1	(United States) Ricky Brabec	Honda	32:37:20	
Stage 7	2	(Argentina) Luciano Benavides	Husqvarna	05:21:45	00:03:12	2	(Botswana) Ross Branch	Hero	32:37:21	00:00:01
Stage 7	3	(Argentina) Kevin Benavides	KTM	05:22:05	00:03:32	3	(Chile) José Ignacio Cornejo	Honda	32:44:08	00:06:48
Stage 8	1	(Argentina) Kevin Benavides	KTM	03:35:03		1	(United States) Ricky Brabec	Honda	36:16:31	
Stage 8	2	(Argentina) Luciano Benavides	Husqvarna	03:35:34	00:00:31	2	(Botswana) Ross Branch	Hero	36:17:13	00:00:42
Stage 8	3	(France) Adrien Van Beveren	Honda	03:36:30	00:01:27	3	(Chile) José Ignacio Cornejo	Honda	36:20:52	00:04:21
Stage 9	1	(France) Adrien Van Beveren	Honda	04:36:46		1	(United States) Ricky Brabec	Honda	40:53:49	
Stage 9	2	(United States) Ricky Brabec	Honda	04:37:18	00:00:32	2	(Botswana) Ross Branch	Hero	41:00:58	00:07:09
Stage 9	3	(Chile) Pablo Quintanilla	Honda	04:41:05	00:04:19	3	(France) Adrien Van Beveren	Honda	41:05:15	00:11:26
Stage 10	1	(United States) Ricky Brabec	Honda	03:51:39		1	(United States) Ricky Brabec	Honda	44:45:28	
Stage 10	2	(Chile) José Ignacio Cornejo	Honda	03:51:41	00:00:02	2	(Botswana) Ross Branch	Hero	44:56:22	00:10:54
Stage 10	3	(France) Adrien Van Beveren	Honda	03:51:59	00:00:20	3	(France) Adrien Van Beveren	Honda	44:57:14	00:11:46
Stage 11	1	(Botswana) Ross Branch	Hero	04:51:57		1	(United States) Ricky Brabec	Honda	49:37:57	
Stage 11	2	(United States) Ricky Brabec	Honda	04:52:29	00:00:32	2	(Botswana) Ross Branch	Hero	49:48:19	00:10:22
Stage 11	3	(France) Adrien Van Beveren	Honda	04:55:14	00:03:17	3	(France) Adrien Van Beveren	Honda	49:52:28	00:14:31
Stage 12	1	(Argentina) Kevin Benavides	KTM	01:48:40		1	(United States) Ricky Brabec	Honda	51:30:08	
Stage 12	2	(Australia) Toby Price	KTM	01:49:40	00:01:00	2	(Botswana) Ross Branch	Hero	51:41:01	00:10:53
Stage 12	3	(Argentina) Luciano Benavides	Husqvarna	01:49:54	00:01:14	3	(France) Adrien Van Beveren	Honda	51:42:33	00:12:25

=== Quads ===
	Stage result					General classification				
Stage	Pos	Competitor	Make	Time	Gap	Pos	Competitor	Make	Time	Gap
Prologue	1	(Argentina) Francisco Moreno Flores	Yamaha	00:21:31		1	(Argentina) Francisco Moreno Flores	Yamaha	00:21:31	
Prologue	2	(Argentina) Manuel Andújar	Yamaha	00:21:59	00:00:28	2	(Argentina) Manuel Andújar	Yamaha	00:21:59	00:00:28
Prologue	3	(France) Alexandre Giroud	Yamaha	00:22:46	00:01:15	3	(France) Alexandre Giroud	Yamaha	00:22:46	00:01:15
Stage 1	1	(Brazil) Marcelo Medeiros	Yamaha	06:16:25		1	(Brazil) Marcelo Medeiros	Yamaha	06:41:34	
Stage 1	2	(Slovakia) Juraj Varga	Yamaha	06:19:05	00:02:40	2	(Slovakia) Juraj Varga	Yamaha	06:44:10	00:02:36
Stage 1	3	(Argentina) Manuel Andújar	Yamaha	06:27:52	00:11:27	3	(Argentina) Manuel Andújar	Yamaha	06:49:51	00:08:17
Stage 2	1	(Brazil) Marcelo Medeiros	Yamaha	05:37:04		1	(Brazil) Marcelo Medeiros	Yamaha	12:18:38	
Stage 2	2	(Slovakia) Juraj Varga	Yamaha	05:41:20	00:04:16	2	(Slovakia) Juraj Varga	Yamaha	12:25:30	00:06:52
Stage 2	3	(Argentina) Manuel Andújar	Yamaha	05:42:59	00:05:55	3	(Argentina) Manuel Andújar	Yamaha	12:32:50	00:14:12
Stage 3	1	(France) Alexandre Giroud	Yamaha	05:43:34		1	(Slovakia) Juraj Varga	Yamaha	18:15:21	
Stage 3	2	(Argentina) Manuel Andújar	Yamaha	05:43:52	00:00:18	2	(Argentina) Manuel Andújar	Yamaha	18:16:42	00:01:21
Stage 3	3	(Slovakia) Juraj Varga	Yamaha	05:49:51	00:06:17	3	(Brazil) Marcelo Medeiros	Yamaha	18:30:13	00:14:52
Stage 4	1	(Argentina) Manuel Andújar	Yamaha	03:35:06		1	(Argentina) Manuel Andújar	Yamaha	21:51:48	
Stage 4	2	(France) Alexandre Giroud	Yamaha	03:35:38	00:00:32	2	(France) Alexandre Giroud	Yamaha	22:13:12	00:21:24
Stage 4	3	(Brazil) Marcelo Medeiros	Yamaha	03:45:42	00:10:36	3	(Brazil) Marcelo Medeiros	Yamaha	22:15:55	00:24:07
Stage 5	1	(Brazil) Marcelo Medeiros	Yamaha	01:51:09		1	(Argentina) Manuel Andújar	Yamaha	23:45:23	
Stage 5	2	(France) Alexandre Giroud	Yamaha	01:52:30	00:01:21	2	(France) Alexandre Giroud	Yamaha	24:05:42	00:20:19
Stage 5	3	(Argentina) Manuel Andújar	Yamaha	01:53:35	00:02:26	3	(Brazil) Marcelo Medeiros	Yamaha	24:07:04	00:21:41
Stage 6	1	(France) Alexandre Giroud	Yamaha	09:57:12		1	(Argentina) Manuel Andújar	Yamaha	33:42:44	
Stage 6	2	(Argentina) Manuel Andújar	Yamaha	09:57:21	00:00:09	2	(France) Alexandre Giroud	Yamaha	34:02:54	00:20:10
Stage 6	3	(Brazil) Marcelo Medeiros	Yamaha	10:21:16	00:24:04	3	(Brazil) Marcelo Medeiros	Yamaha	34:28:20	00:45:36
Stage 7	1	(France) Alexandre Giroud	Yamaha	06:51:26		1	(Argentina) Manuel Andújar	Yamaha	40:48:00	
Stage 7	2	(Argentina) Manuel Andújar	Yamaha	07:05:16	00:13:50	2	(France) Alexandre Giroud	Yamaha	40:54:20	00:06:20
Stage 7	3	(Slovakia) Juraj Varga	Yamaha	07:20:42	00:29:16	3	(Slovakia) Juraj Varga	Yamaha	43:15:46	02:27:46
Stage 8	1	(Argentina) Manuel Andújar	Yamaha	04:24:40		1	(Argentina) Manuel Andújar	Yamaha	45:12:40	
Stage 8	2	(France) Alexandre Giroud	Yamaha	04:29:46	00:05:06	2	(France) Alexandre Giroud	Yamaha	45:24:06	00:11:26
Stage 8	3	(Slovakia) Juraj Varga	Yamaha	04:40:19	00:15:39	3	(Slovakia) Juraj Varga	Yamaha	47:56:05	02:43:25
Stage 9	1	(France) Alexandre Giroud	Yamaha	05:49:34		1	(Argentina) Manuel Andújar	Yamaha	51:07:27	
Stage 9	2	(Argentina) Manuel Andújar	Yamaha	05:54:47	00:05:13	2	(France) Alexandre Giroud	Yamaha	51:13:40	00:06:13
Stage 9	3	(Slovakia) Juraj Varga	Yamaha	06:19:27	00:29:53	3	(Slovakia) Juraj Varga	Yamaha	54:15:32	03:08:05
Stage 10	1	(Argentina) Manuel Andújar	Yamaha	04:49:23		1	(Argentina) Manuel Andújar	Yamaha	55:56:50	
Stage 10	2	(France) Alexandre Giroud	Yamaha	04:52:01	00:02:38	2	(France) Alexandre Giroud	Yamaha	56:05:41	00:08:51
Stage 10	3	(Slovakia) Juraj Varga	Yamaha	05:05:40	00:16:17	3	(Slovakia) Juraj Varga	Yamaha	59:21:12	03:24:22
Stage 11	1	(France) Alexandre Giroud	Yamaha	06:13:57		1	(Argentina) Manuel Andújar	Yamaha	62:11:24	
Stage 11	2	(Argentina) Manuel Andújar	Yamaha	06:14:34	00:00:37	2	(France) Alexandre Giroud	Yamaha	62:19:38	00:08:14
Stage 11	3	(Slovakia) Juraj Varga	Yamaha	06:35:29	00:21:32	3	(Slovakia) Juraj Varga	Yamaha	65:56:41	03:45:17
Stage 12	1	(France) Alexandre Giroud	Yamaha	02:05:14		1	(Argentina) Manuel Andújar	Yamaha	64:16:53	
Stage 12	2	(Argentina) Manuel Andújar	Yamaha	02:05:29	00:00:15	2	(France) Alexandre Giroud	Yamaha	64:24:52	00:07:59
Stage 12	3	(Slovakia) Juraj Varga	Yamaha	02:23:37	00:18:23	3	(Slovakia) Juraj Varga	Yamaha	68:20:18	04:03:25

=== Cars ===
	Stage result					General classification				
Stage	Pos	Competitor	Make	Time	Gap	Pos	Competitor	Make	Time	Gap
Prologue	1	(Sweden) Mattias Ekström	Audi	00:16:30		results of Prologue aren't accountable towards GC, only for starting position on Stage 1				
Prologue	2	(United States) Seth Quintero	Toyota	00:16:53	00:00:23	results of Prologue aren't accountable towards GC, only for starting position on Stage 1				
Prologue	3	(France) Sébastien Loeb	Prodrive	00:17:08	00:00:38	results of Prologue aren't accountable towards GC, only for starting position on Stage 1				
Stage 1	1	(Belgium) Guillaume De Mévius	Toyota	04:35:59		1	(Belgium) Guillaume De Mévius	Toyota	04:35:59	
Stage 1	2	(Spain) Carlos Sainz	Audi	04:37:43	00:01:44	2	(Spain) Carlos Sainz	Audi	04:37:43	00:01:44
Stage 1	3	(South Africa) Giniel de Villiers	Toyota	04:45:17	00:09:18	3	(South Africa) Giniel de Villiers	Toyota	04:45:17	00:09:18
Stage 2	1	(France) Stéphane Peterhansel	Audi	03:54:40		1	(Spain) Carlos Sainz	Audi	08:49:38	
Stage 2	2	(France) Sébastien Loeb	Prodrive	03:55:09	00:00:29	2	(Saudi Arabia) Yazeed Al-Rajhi	Toyota	08:51:29	00:01:51
Stage 2	3	(United States) Seth Quintero	Toyota	03:57:51	00:03:11	3	(France) Sébastien Loeb	Prodrive	08:53:55	00:04:17
Stage 3	1	(Brazil) Lucas Moraes	Toyota	04:14:51		1	(Saudi Arabia) Yazeed Al-Rajhi	Toyota	13:07:29	
Stage 3	2	(Sweden) Mattias Ekström	Audi	04:15:00	00:00:09	2	(Spain) Carlos Sainz	Audi	13:07:58	00:00:29
Stage 3	3	(Saudi Arabia) Yazeed Al-Rajhi	Toyota	04:16:00	00:01:09	3	(Sweden) Mattias Ekström	Audi	13:15:55	00:08:26
Stage 4	1	(France) Sébastien Loeb	Prodrive	02:36:02		1	(Saudi Arabia) Yazeed Al-Rajhi	Toyota	15:44:39	
Stage 4	2	(Saudi Arabia) Yazeed Al-Rajhi	Toyota	02:37:10	00:01:08	2	(Spain) Carlos Sainz	Audi	15:49:08	00:04:29
Stage 4	3	(Qatar) Nasser Al-Attiyah	Prodrive	02:37:24	00:01:22	3	(Qatar) Nasser Al-Attiyah	Prodrive	15:55:42	00:11:03
Stage 5	1	(Qatar) Nasser Al-Attiyah	Prodrive	01:37:25		1	(Saudi Arabia) Yazeed Al-Rajhi	Toyota	17:24:04	
Stage 5	2	(France) Guerlain Chicherit	Toyota	01:39:16	00:01:51	2	(Qatar) Nasser Al-Attiyah	Prodrive	17:33:07	00:09:03
Stage 5	3	(Argentina) Juan Cruz Yacopini	Toyota	01:39:23	00:01:58	3	(Spain) Carlos Sainz	Audi	17:35:35	00:11:31
Stage 6	1	(France) Sébastien Loeb	Prodrive	07:21:56		1	(Spain) Carlos Sainz	Audi	24:59:32	
Stage 6	2	(Spain) Carlos Sainz	Audi	07:23:57	00:02:01	2	(Sweden) Mattias Ekström	Audi	25:19:53	00:20:21
Stage 6	3	(Sweden) Mattias Ekström	Audi	07:32:51	00:10:55	3	(France) Sébastien Loeb	Prodrive	25:29:03	00:29:31
Stage 7	1	(France) Sébastien Loeb	Prodrive	04:56:39		1	(Spain) Carlos Sainz	Audi	30:06:42	
Stage 7	2	(Brazil) Lucas Moraes	Toyota	05:03:45	00:07:06	2	(France) Sébastien Loeb	Prodrive	30:25:42	00:19:00
Stage 7	3	(Qatar) Nasser Al-Attiyah	Prodrive	05:06:26	00:09:47	3	(Brazil) Lucas Moraes	Toyota	31:07:17	01:00:35
Stage 8	1	(Sweden) Mattias Ekström	Audi	03:17:15		1	(Spain) Carlos Sainz	Audi	33:29:10	
Stage 8	2	(France) Stéphane Peterhansel	Audi	03:20:00	00:02:45	2	(France) Sébastien Loeb	Prodrive	33:53:57	00:24:47
Stage 8	3	(France) Guerlain Chicherit	Toyota	03:20:25	00:03:10	3	(Brazil) Lucas Moraes	Toyota	34:34:23	01:05:13
Stage 9	1	(France) Sébastien Loeb	Prodrive	04:17:33		1	(Spain) Carlos Sainz	Audi	37:50:57	
Stage 9	2	(Spain) Carlos Sainz	Audi	04:21:47	00:04:14	2	(France) Sébastien Loeb	Prodrive	38:11:30	00:20:33
Stage 9	3	(France) Mathieu Serradori	Century	04:22:16	00:04:43	3	(Brazil) Lucas Moraes	Toyota	39:02:59	01:12:02
Stage 10	1	(France) Guerlain Chicherit	Toyota	03:19:27		1	(Spain) Carlos Sainz	Audi	41:36:12	
Stage 10	2	(South Africa) Brian Baragwanath	Century	03:25:10	00:05:43	2	(France) Sébastien Loeb	Prodrive	41:49:34	00:13:22
Stage 10	3	(Lithuania) Benediktas Vanagas	Toyota	03:25:31	00:06:04	3	(Brazil) Lucas Moraes	Toyota	42:37:56	01:01:44
Stage 11	1	(France) Guerlain Chicherit	Toyota	04:43:00		1	(Spain) Carlos Sainz	Audi	46:24:47	
Stage 11	2	(Belgium) Guillaume De Mévius	Toyota	04:48:32	00:05:32	2	(Belgium) Guillaume De Mévius	Toyota	47:50:53	01:26:06
Stage 11	3	(Spain) Carlos Sainz	Audi	04:48:35	00:05:35	3	(France) Sébastien Loeb	Prodrive	48:04:49	01:40:02
Stage 12	1	(France) Sébastien Loeb	Prodrive	01:39:41		1	(Spain) Carlos Sainz	Audi	48:15:18	
Stage 12	2	(Belgium) Guillaume De Mévius	Toyota	01:44:50	00:05:09	2	(Belgium) Guillaume De Mévius	Toyota	49:35:43	01:20:25
Stage 12	3	(Lithuania) Vaidotas Žala	Mini	01:45:02	00:05:21	3	(France) Sébastien Loeb	Prodrive	49:44:30	01:29:12

=== Challenger (T3) ===
	Stage result					General classification				
Stage	Pos	Competitor	Make	Time	Gap	Pos	Competitor	Make	Time	Gap
Prologue	1	(Poland) Eryk Goczał	Taurus	00:17:34		results of Prologue aren't accountable towards GC, only for starting position on Stage 1				
Prologue	2	(Poland) Michał Goczał	Taurus	00:17:54	00:00:20	results of Prologue aren't accountable towards GC, only for starting position on Stage 1				
Prologue	3	(United Kingdom) Kris Meeke	OT3	00:17:55	00:00:21	results of Prologue aren't accountable towards GC, only for starting position on Stage 1				
Stage 1	1	(Poland) Marek Goczał	Taurus	05:21:56		1	(Poland) Marek Goczał	Taurus	05:21:56	
Stage 1	2	(United States) Austin Jones	Can-Am	05:24:42	00:02:46	2	(United States) Austin Jones	Can-Am	05:24:42	00:02:46
Stage 1	3	(Spain) Cristina Gutiérrez	Taurus	05:27:44	00:05:48	3	(Spain) Cristina Gutiérrez	Taurus	05:27:44	00:05:48
Stage 2	1	(United States) Mitch Guthrie	Taurus	04:28:17		1	(Poland) Marek Goczał	Taurus	09:51:04	
Stage 2	2	(Poland) Marek Goczał	Taurus	04:29:08	00:00:51	2	(United States) Mitch Guthrie	Taurus	09:56:47	00:05:43
Stage 2	3	(Chile) Francisco López Contardo	Can-Am	04:29:27	00:01:10	3	(Spain) Cristina Gutiérrez	Taurus	09:57:34	00:06:30
Stage 3	1	(United States) Mitch Guthrie	Taurus	04:39:08		1	(Poland) Marek Goczał	Taurus	14:35:44	
Stage 3	2	(Poland) Marek Goczał	Taurus	04:44:40	00:05:32	2	(United States) Mitch Guthrie	Taurus	14:35:55	00:00:11
Stage 3	3	(Spain) Cristina Gutiérrez	Taurus	04:49:07	00:09:59	3	(Spain) Cristina Gutiérrez	Taurus	14:46:41	00:10:57
Stage 4	1	(Chile) Ignacio Casale	Yamaha	03:12:30		1	(Poland) Marek Goczał	Taurus	17:49:20	
Stage 4	2	(Poland) Marek Goczał	Taurus	03:13:36	00:01:06	2	(United States) Mitch Guthrie	Taurus	17:54:48	00:05:28
Stage 4	3	(Portugal) Ricardo Porém	Can-Am	03:14:03	00:01:33	3	(United States) Austin Jones	Can-Am	18:23:39	00:34:19
Stage 5	1	(Chile) Francisco López Contardo	Can-Am	01:40:47		1	(Poland) Marek Goczał	Taurus	19:36:08	
Stage 5	2	(United States) Austin Jones	Can-Am	01:42:51	00:02:04	2	(United States) Mitch Guthrie	Taurus	19:41:04	00:04:56
Stage 5	3	(Argentina) Nicolás Cavigliasso	Taurus	01:44:25	00:03:38	3	(Chile) Francisco López Contardo	Can-Am	20:05:50	00:29:42
Stage 6	1	(Spain) Cristina Gutiérrez	Taurus	08:09:40		1	(United States) Mitch Guthrie	Taurus	27:54:20	
Stage 6	2	(Chile) Francisco López Contardo	Can-Am	08:13:04	00:03:24	2	(Spain) Cristina Gutiérrez	Taurus	28:18:36	00:24:16
Stage 6	3	(United States) Mitch Guthrie	Taurus	08:13:16	00:03:36	3	(Chile) Francisco López Contardo	Can-Am	28:18:54	00:24:34
Stage 7	1	(United States) Mitch Guthrie	Taurus	05:35:09		1	(United States) Mitch Guthrie	Taurus	33:29:29	
Stage 7	2	(Lithuania) Rokas Baciuška	Can-Am	05:40:47	00:05:38	2	(Spain) Cristina Gutiérrez	Taurus	34:03:05	00:33:36
Stage 7	3	(Saudi Arabia) Saleh Alsaif	OT3	05:43:47	00:08:38	3	(Chile) Francisco López Contardo	Can-Am	34:09:45	00:40:16
Stage 8	1	(Saudi Arabia) Saleh Alsaif	OT3	03:35:28		1	(United States) Mitch Guthrie	Taurus	37:08:19	
Stage 8	2	(United States) Mitch Guthrie	Taurus	03:38:50	00:03:22	2	(Spain) Cristina Gutiérrez	Taurus	37:42:22	00:34:03
Stage 8	3	(Spain) Cristina Gutiérrez	Taurus	03:39:17	00:03:49	3	(Chile) Francisco López Contardo	Can-Am	37:51:10	00:42:51
Stage 9	1	(Argentina) Nicolás Cavigliasso	Taurus	04:47:58		1	(United States) Mitch Guthrie	Taurus	42:09:25	
Stage 9	2	(Chile) Francisco López Contardo	Can-Am	04:55:03	00:07:05	2	(Spain) Cristina Gutiérrez	Taurus	42:38:00	00:28:35
Stage 9	3	(Lithuania) Rokas Baciuška	Can-Am	04:55:23	00:07:25	3	(Chile) Francisco López Contardo	Can-Am	42:46:13	00:36:48
Stage 10	1	(Brazil) Marcelo Gastaldi	Taurus	03:44:13		1	(United States) Mitch Guthrie	Taurus	46:01:50	
Stage 10	2	(Argentina) Nicolás Cavigliasso	Taurus	03:45:39	00:01:26	2	(Spain) Cristina Gutiérrez	Taurus	46:29:53	00:28:03
Stage 10	3	(Argentina) David Zille	Can-Am	03:50:46	00:06:33	3	(Chile) Francisco López Contardo	Can-Am	47:15:38	01:13:48
Stage 11	1	(Argentina) Nicolás Cavigliasso	Taurus	05:19:13		1	(United States) Mitch Guthrie	Taurus	51:38:06	
Stage 11	2	(Brazil) Marcelo Gastaldi	Taurus	05:25:31	00:06:18	2	(Spain) Cristina Gutiérrez	Taurus	52:03:13	00:25:07
Stage 11	3	(Saudi Arabia) Saleh Alsaif	OT3	05:28:41	00:09:28	3	(Lithuania) Rokas Baciuška	Can-Am	52:59:01	01:20:55
Stage 12	1	(Brazil) Marcelo Gastaldi	Taurus	01:55:22		1	(Spain) Cristina Gutiérrez	Taurus	53:59:47	
Stage 12	2	(Saudi Arabia) Saleh Alsaif	OT3	01:55:45	00:00:23	2	(United States) Mitch Guthrie	Taurus	54:36:33	00:36:46
Stage 12	3	(Spain) Cristina Gutiérrez	Taurus	01:56:34	00:01:12	3	(Lithuania) Rokas Baciuška	Can-Am	54:58:34	00:58:47

Notes:

- Eryk Goczał and Michał Goczał were disqualified on the rest day following Stage 6 for using an unauthorised carbon clutch. Eryk led the general classification by over an hour at the time, having won the prologue and four of the stages.

=== SSV (T4) ===
	Stage result					General classification				
Stage	Pos	Competitor	Make	Time	Gap	Pos	Competitor	Make	Time	Gap
Prologue	1	(France) Xavier de Soultrait	Polaris	00:18:38		results of Prologue aren't accountable towards GC, only for starting position on Stage 1				
Prologue	2	(Portugal) João Ferreira	Can-Am	00:18:53	00:00:15	results of Prologue aren't accountable towards GC, only for starting position on Stage 1				
Prologue	3	(France) Florent Vayssade	Polaris	00:19:00	00:00:22	results of Prologue aren't accountable towards GC, only for starting position on Stage 1				
Stage 1	1	(Brazil) Rodrigo Varela	Can-Am	05:33:37		1	(Brazil) Rodrigo Varela	Can-Am	05:33:37	
Stage 1	2	(Spain) Gerard Farrés	Can-Am	05:45:54	00:12:17	2	(Spain) Gerard Farrés	Can-Am	05:45:54	00:12:17
Stage 1	3	(United States) Sara Price	Can-Am	05:51:31	00:17:54	3	(United States) Sara Price	Can-Am	05:51:31	00:17:54
Stage 2	1	(Spain) Gerard Farrés	Can-Am	04:50:53		1	(Spain) Gerard Farrés	Can-Am	10:36:47	
Stage 2	2	(France) Xavier de Soultrait	Polaris	04:50:58	00:00:05	2	(Brazil) Rodrigo Varela	Can-Am	10:39:00	00:02:13
Stage 2	3	(Portugal) João Ferreira	Can-Am	04:52:51	00:01:58	3	(France) Xavier de Soultrait	Polaris	10:48:17	00:11:30
Stage 3	1	(Saudi Arabia) Yasir Seaidan	Can-Am	04:57:51		1	(Spain) Gerard Farrés	Can-Am	15:40:02	
Stage 3	2	(Portugal) João Ferreira	Can-Am	05:01:58	00:04:07	2	(United States) Sara Price	Can-Am	15:55:07	00:15:05
Stage 3	3	(Spain) Gerard Farrés	Can-Am	05:03:15	00:05:24	3	(Switzerland) Jérôme de Sadeleer	Can-Am	15:59:43	00:19:41
Stage 4	1	(Portugal) João Ferreira	Can-Am	03:13:09		1	(Spain) Gerard Farrés	Can-Am	19:10:19	
Stage 4	2	(Saudi Arabia) Yasir Seaidan	Can-Am	03:15:57	00:02:48	2	(Switzerland) Jérôme de Sadeleer	Can-Am	19:24:52	00:14:33
Stage 4	3	(France) Xavier de Soultrait	Polaris	03:18:03	00:04:54	3	(Brazil) Rodrigo Varela	Can-Am	19:29:22	00:19:03
Stage 5	1	(France) Xavier de Soultrait	Polaris	01:44:56		1	(Switzerland) Jérôme de Sadeleer	Can-Am	21:13:42	
Stage 5	2	(Saudi Arabia) Yasir Seaidan	Can-Am	01:46:10	00:01:14	2	(Brazil) Rodrigo Varela	Can-Am	21:19:12	00:05:30
Stage 5	3	(Switzerland) Jérôme de Sadeleer	Can-Am	01:48:50	00:03:54	3	(Brazil) Cristiano Batista	Can-Am	21:23:02	00:09:20
Stage 6	1	(France) Xavier de Soultrait	Polaris	08:25:10		1	(Saudi Arabia) Yasir Seaidan	Can-Am	29:55:26	
Stage 6	2	(Portugal) João Ferreira	Can-Am	08:28:45	00:03:35	2	(United States) Sara Price	Can-Am	29:58:24	00:02:58
Stage 6	3	(Saudi Arabia) Yasir Seaidan	Can-Am	08:31:25	00:06:15	3	(France) Xavier de Soultrait	Polaris	30:00:56	00:05:30
Stage 7	1	(Portugal) João Ferreira	Can-Am	05:49:37		1	(France) Xavier de Soultrait	Polaris	35:51:08	
Stage 7	2	(France) Xavier de Soultrait	Polaris	05:50:12	00:00:35	2	(Saudi Arabia) Yasir Seaidan	Can-Am	35:58:38	00:07:30
Stage 7	3	(Switzerland) Jérôme de Sadeleer	Can-Am	05:58:24	00:08:47	3	(United States) Sara Price	Can-Am	35:58:46	00:07:38
Stage 8	1	(Portugal) João Ferreira	Can-Am	03:46:46		1	(France) Xavier de Soultrait	Polaris	39:41:37	
Stage 8	2	(France) Xavier de Soultrait	Polaris	03:50:29	00:03:43	2	(Portugal) João Ferreira	Can-Am	39:49:18	00:07:41
Stage 8	3	(Spain) Gerard Farrés	Can-Am	03:53:53	00:07:07	3	(United States) Sara Price	Can-Am	39:54:09	00:12:32
Stage 9	1	(Brazil) Cristiano Batista	Can-Am	05:02:30		1	(France) Xavier de Soultrait	Polaris	44:53:33	
Stage 9	2	(France) Xavier de Soultrait	Polaris	05:11:56	00:09:26	2	(United States) Sara Price	Can-Am	45:21:49	00:28:16
Stage 9	3	(Spain) Gerard Farrés	Can-Am	05:13:08	00:10:38	3	(Switzerland) Jérôme de Sadeleer	Can-Am	45:24:43	00:31:10
Stage 10	1	(United States) Sara Price	Can-Am	03:51:19		1	(France) Xavier de Soultrait	Polaris	49:02:42	
Stage 10	2	(Switzerland) Jérôme de Sadeleer	Can-Am	03:51:41	00:00:22	2	(United States) Sara Price	Can-Am	49:13:08	00:10:26
Stage 10	3	(Brazil) Rodrigo Varela	Can-Am	03:55:29	00:04:10	3	(Switzerland) Jérôme de Sadeleer	Can-Am	49:16:24	00:13:42
Stage 11	1	(Switzerland) Jérôme de Sadeleer	Can-Am	05:21:36		1	(France) Xavier de Soultrait	Polaris	54:35:11	
Stage 11	2	(Spain) Gerard Farrés	Can-Am	05:21:38	00:00:02	2	(Switzerland) Jérôme de Sadeleer	Can-Am	54:38:00	00:02:49
Stage 11	3	(Brazil) Cristiano Batista	Can-Am	05:26:27	00:04:51	3	(Saudi Arabia) Yasir Seaidan	Can-Am	55:38:45	01:03:34
Stage 12	1	(France) Florent Vayssade	Polaris	02:00:57		1	(France) Xavier de Soultrait	Polaris	56:37:43	
Stage 12	2	(Portugal) João Ferreira	Can-Am	02:01:57	00:01:00	2	(Switzerland) Jérôme de Sadeleer	Can-Am	56:40:08	00:02:25
Stage 12	3	(Switzerland) Jérôme de Sadeleer	Can-Am	02:02:08	00:01:11	3	(Saudi Arabia) Yasir Seaidan	Can-Am	57:42:11	01:04:28

=== Trucks ===
	Stage result					General classification				
Stage	Pos	Competitor	Make	Time	Gap	Pos	Competitor	Make	Time	Gap
Prologue	1	(Netherlands) Janus van Kasteren	Iveco	00:19:34		results of Prologue aren't accountable towards GC, only for starting position on Stage 1				
Prologue	2	(Czech Republic) Aleš Loprais	Praga	00:19:50	00:00:16	results of Prologue aren't accountable towards GC, only for starting position on Stage 1				
Prologue	3	(Netherlands) Mitchel van den Brink	Iveco	00:20:19	00:00:45	results of Prologue aren't accountable towards GC, only for starting position on Stage 1				
Stage 1	1	(Netherlands) Janus van Kasteren	Iveco	04:55:25		1	(Netherlands) Janus van Kasteren	Iveco	04:55:25	
Stage 1	2	(Netherlands) Gert Huzink	Renault	05:02:28	00:07:03	2	(Netherlands) Gert Huzink	Renault	05:02:28	00:07:03
Stage 1	3	(Czech Republic) Jaroslav Valtr	Tatra	05:06:57	00:11:32	3	(Czech Republic) Jaroslav Valtr	Tatra	05:06:57	00:11:32
Stage 2	1	(Netherlands) Janus van Kasteren	Iveco	04:36:12		1	(Netherlands) Janus van Kasteren	Iveco	09:31:37	
Stage 2	2	(Czech Republic) Aleš Loprais	Praga	04:36:18	00:00:06	2	(Czech Republic) Aleš Loprais	Praga	09:44:32	00:12:55
Stage 2	3	(Czech Republic) Martin Macík	Iveco	04:38:34	00:02:22	3	(Czech Republic) Martin Macík	Iveco	09:53:34	00:21:57
Stage 3	1	(Czech Republic) Martin Macík	Iveco	05:01:08		1	(Netherlands) Janus van Kasteren	Iveco	14:44:28	
Stage 3	2	(Czech Republic) Aleš Loprais	Praga	05:01:41	00:00:33	2	(Czech Republic) Aleš Loprais	Praga	14:46:13	00:01:45
Stage 3	3	(Netherlands) Janus van Kasteren	Iveco	05:12:51	00:11:43	3	(Czech Republic) Martin Macík	Iveco	14:54:42	00:10:14
Stage 4	1	(Netherlands) Janus van Kasteren	Iveco	03:00:49		1	(Netherlands) Janus van Kasteren	Iveco	17:45:17	
Stage 4	2	(Netherlands) Mitchel van den Brink	Iveco	03:06:53	00:06:04	2	(Czech Republic) Aleš Loprais	Praga	17:55:34	00:10:17
Stage 4	3	(Czech Republic) Aleš Loprais	Praga	03:09:21	00:08:32	3	(Czech Republic) Martin Macík	Iveco	18:31:00	00:45:43
Stage 5	1	(Czech Republic) Martin Macík	Iveco	01:52:25		1	(Netherlands) Janus van Kasteren	Iveco	20:01:22	
Stage 5	2	(Netherlands) Mitchel van den Brink	Iveco	01:53:47	00:01:22	2	(Czech Republic) Martin Macík	Iveco	20:23:25	00:22:03
Stage 5	3	(Netherlands) Vick Versteijnen	Iveco	02:00:20	00:07:55	3	(Czech Republic) Aleš Loprais	Praga	20:27:27	00:26:05
Stage 6	1	(Czech Republic) Martin Macík	Iveco	08:35:53		1	(Czech Republic) Martin Macík	Iveco	28:59:18	
Stage 6	2	(Netherlands) Mitchel van den Brink	Iveco	09:41:34	01:05:41	2	(Czech Republic) Aleš Loprais	Praga	30:16:00	01:16:42
Stage 6	3	(Czech Republic) Aleš Loprais	Praga	09:48:33	01:12:40	3	(Netherlands) Mitchel van den Brink	Iveco	30:49:17	01:49:59
Stage 7	1	(Czech Republic) Martin Macík	Iveco	05:40:52		1	(Czech Republic) Martin Macík	Iveco	34:40:10	
Stage 7	2	(Netherlands) Mitchel van den Brink	Iveco	05:41:31	00:00:39	2	(Czech Republic) Aleš Loprais	Praga	36:19:20	01:39:10
Stage 7	3	(Czech Republic) Aleš Loprais	Praga	06:03:20	00:22:28	3	(Netherlands) Mitchel van den Brink	Iveco	36:30:48	01:50:38
Stage 8	1	(Netherlands) Mitchel van den Brink	Iveco	03:38:27		1	(Czech Republic) Martin Macík	Iveco	38:19:55	
Stage 8	2	(Czech Republic) Martin Macík	Iveco	03:39:45	00:01:18	2	(Netherlands) Mitchel van den Brink	Iveco	49:09:15	01:49:20
Stage 8	3	(Czech Republic) Aleš Loprais	Praga	03:52:12	00:13:45	3	(Czech Republic) Aleš Loprais	Praga	40:11:32	01:51:37
Stage 9	1	(Netherlands) Gert Huzink	Renault	05:04:34		1	(Czech Republic) Martin Macík	Iveco	43:26:01	
Stage 9	2	(Czech Republic) Martin Macík	Iveco	05:06:06	00:01:32	2	(Czech Republic) Aleš Loprais	Praga	45:20:43	01:54:42
Stage 9	3	(Czech Republic) Aleš Loprais	Praga	05:09:11	00:04:37	3	(Netherlands) Mitchel van den Brink	Iveco	45:38:11	02:12:10
Stage 10	1	(Netherlands) Gert Huzink	Renault	03:40:39		1	(Czech Republic) Martin Macík	Iveco	47:07:48	
Stage 10	2	(Czech Republic) Martin Macík	Iveco	03:41:47	00:01:08	2	(Czech Republic) Aleš Loprais	Praga	49:13:56	02:06:08
Stage 10	3	(Netherlands) Michiel Becx	Iveco	03:49:39	00:09:00	3	(Netherlands) Mitchel van den Brink	Iveco	50:39:34	03:31:46
Stage 11	1	(Czech Republic) Aleš Loprais	Praga	05:18:50		1	(Czech Republic) Martin Macík	Iveco	52:31:45	
Stage 11	2	(Czech Republic) Martin Macík	Iveco	05:23:57	00:05:07	2	(Czech Republic) Aleš Loprais	Praga	54:32:46	02:01:01
Stage 11	3	(Czech Republic) Jaroslav Valtr	Tatra	05:50:39	00:31:49	3	(Netherlands) Mitchel van den Brink	Iveco	56:59:10	04:27:25
Stage 12	1	(Czech Republic) Aleš Loprais	Praga	01:56:41		1	(Czech Republic) Martin Macík	Iveco	54:34:48	
Stage 12	2	(Czech Republic) Jaroslav Valtr	Tatra	01:58:11	00:01:30	2	(Czech Republic) Aleš Loprais	Praga	56:29:27	01:54:39
Stage 12	3	(Netherlands) Janus van Kasteren	Iveco	01:58:25	00:01:44	3	(Netherlands) Mitchel van den Brink	Iveco	59:04:14	04:29:26

=== Classics ===
	Stage result					General classification				
Stage	Pos	Competitor	Make	Points	Gap	Pos	Competitor	Make	Points	Gap
Prologue	1	(Spain) Juan Morera	Porsche	3		1	(Spain) Juan Morera	Porsche	3	
Prologue	2	(France) Frederic Larre	Porsche	5	+2	2	(France) Frederic Larre	Porsche	5	+2
Prologue	3	(Spain) Vincent Gonzalez	Toyota	7	+4	3	(Spain) Vincent Gonzalez	Toyota	7	+4
Stage 1	1	(Italy) Lorenzo Traglio	Nissan	38		1	(Italy) Lorenzo Traglio	Nissan	38	
Stage 1	2	(Italy) Paolo Bedeschi	Toyota	57	+19	2	(Italy) Paolo Bedeschi	Toyota	57	+19
Stage 1	3	(Czech Republic) Ondřej Klymčiw	Škoda	64	+26	3	(Czech Republic) Ondřej Klymčiw	Škoda	64	+26
Stage 2	1	(Spain) Juan Morera	Porsche	15		1	(Spain) Carlos Santaolalla	Toyota	92	
Stage 2	2	(Spain) Carlos Santaolalla	Toyota	20	+5	2	(Czech Republic) Ondřej Klymčiw	Škoda	93	+1
Stage 2	3	(Czech Republic) Ondřej Klymčiw	Škoda	29	+14	3	(Italy) Paolo Bedeschi	Toyota	111	+19
Stage 3	1	(Spain) Carlos Santaolalla	Toyota	49		1	(Spain) Carlos Santaolalla	Toyota	141	
Stage 3	2	(Czech Republic) Ondřej Klymčiw	Škoda	56	+7	2	(Czech Republic) Ondřej Klymčiw	Škoda	149	+8
Stage 3	3	(Italy) Lorenzo Traglio	Nissan	61	+12	3	(Italy) Lorenzo Traglio	Nissan	204	+63
Stage 4	1	(Spain) Carlos Santaolalla	Toyota	24		1	(Spain) Carlos Santaolalla	Toyota	165	
Stage 4	2	(Czech Republic) Ondřej Klymčiw	Škoda	25	+1	2	(Czech Republic) Ondřej Klymčiw	Škoda	174	+9
Stage 4	3	(Italy) Marco Ernesto Leva	Mitsubishi	30	+6	3	(Italy) Lorenzo Traglio	Nissan	250	+85
Stage 5	1	(Czech Republic) Ondřej Klymčiw	Škoda	21		1	(Czech Republic) Ondřej Klymčiw	Škoda	195	
Stage 5	2	(Spain) Carlos Santaolalla	Toyota	57	+36	2	(Spain) Carlos Santaolalla	Toyota	222	+27
Stage 5	3	(Spain) Juan Morera	Porsche	58	+37	3	(Italy) Paolo Bedeschi	Toyota	354	+159
Stage 6	1	(Spain) Carlos Santaolalla	Toyota	92		1	(Spain) Carlos Santaolalla	Toyota	314	
Stage 6	2	(Italy) Lorenzo Traglio	Nissan	95	+3	2	(Czech Republic) Ondřej Klymčiw	Škoda	370	+56
Stage 6	3	(France) Maxence Gublin	Land Rover	126	+34	3	(Italy) Paolo Bedeschi	Toyota	504	+190
Stage 7	1	(Spain) Carlos Santaolalla	Toyota	32		1	(Spain) Carlos Santaolalla	Toyota	346	
Stage 7	2	(Spain) Juan Morera	Porsche	33	+1	2	(Czech Republic) Ondřej Klymčiw	Škoda	422	+76
Stage 7	3	(France) Frederic Larre	Porsche	39	+7	3	(Italy) Paolo Bedeschi	Toyota	623	+277
Stage 8	1	(Italy) Lorenzo Traglio	Nissan	67		1	(Czech Republic) Ondřej Klymčiw	Škoda	538	
Stage 8	2	(France) Maxence Gublin	Land Rover	75	+8	2	(Italy) Lorenzo Traglio	Nissan	691	+153
Stage 8	3	(Italy) Filippo Giorgio Colnaghi	Nissan	94	+27	3	(Spain) Carlos Santaolalla	Toyota	717	+179
Stage 9	1	(Spain) Carlos Santaolalla	Toyota	43		1	(Spain) Carlos Santaolalla	Toyota	760	
Stage 9	2	(France) Frederic Larre	Porsche	44	+1	2	(Italy) Lorenzo Traglio	Nissan	762	+2
Stage 9	3	(Spain) Juan Morera	Porsche	49	+6	3	(Italy) Paolo Bedeschi	Toyota	817	+57
Stage 10	1	(Spain) Carlos Santaolalla	Toyota	31		1	(Spain) Carlos Santaolalla	Toyota	791	
Stage 10	2	(Italy) Lorenzo Traglio	Nissan	35	+4	2	(Italy) Lorenzo Traglio	Nissan	797	+6
Stage 10	3	(Spain) Juan Morera	Porsche	36	+5	3	(Italy) Paolo Bedeschi	Toyota	949	+158
Stage 11	1	(Italy) Lorenzo Traglio	Nissan	9		1	(Spain) Carlos Santaolalla	Toyota	805	
Stage 11	2	(Spain) Carlos Santaolalla	Toyota	14	+5	2	(Italy) Lorenzo Traglio	Nissan	806	+1
Stage 11	3	(Czech Republic) Ondřej Klymčiw	Škoda	16	+7	3	(Italy) Paolo Bedeschi	Toyota	1009	+204
Stage 12	1	(Spain) Carlos Santaolalla	Toyota	15		1	(Spain) Carlos Santaolalla	Toyota	820	
Stage 12	2	(Spain) Juan Morera	Porsche	21	+6	2	(Italy) Lorenzo Traglio	Nissan	832	+12
Stage 12	3	(Croatia) Juraj Šebalj	Nissan	23	+8	3	(Italy) Paolo Bedeschi	Toyota	1061	+241

=== Mission 1000 ===
	Stage result					General classification				
Stage	Pos	Competitor	Make	Points	Gap	Pos	Competitor	Make	Points	Gap
Stage 1	1	(France) Sylvain Espinasse	Tacita	10		1	(France) Sylvain Espinasse	Tacita	10	
Stage 1	2	(France) Willy Jobard	Arctic Leopard	10	-0	2	(France) Willy Jobard	Arctic Leopard	10	-0
Stage 1	3	(China) Wenmin Su	Arctic Leopard	10	-0	3	(China) Wenmin Su	Arctic Leopard	10	-0
Stage 2	1	(France) Willy Jobard	Arctic Leopard	10		1	(France) Willy Jobard	Arctic Leopard	20	
Stage 2	2	(China) Wenmin Su	Arctic Leopard	10	-0	2	(China) Wenmin Su	Arctic Leopard	20	-0
Stage 2	3	(China) Gang Jun Cai	Arctic Leopard	10	-0	3	(China) Gang Jun Cai	Arctic Leopard	20	-0
Stage 3	1	(Spain) Jordi Juvanteny	MAN	20		1	(Spain) Jordi Juvanteny	MAN	40	
Stage 3	2	(China) Wenmin Su	Arctic Leopard	10	-10	2	(China) Wenmin Su	Arctic Leopard	30	-10
Stage 3	3	(Spain) Francisco Jose Gomez Pallas	Bat	10	-10	3	(Spain) Francisco Jose Gomez Pallas	Bat	30	-10
Stage 4	1	(China) Wenmin Su	Arctic Leopard	10		1	(Spain) Jordi Juvanteny	MAN	50	
Stage 4	2	(United States) Jamie Campbell	HySE-X1	10	-0	2	(China) Wenmin Su	Arctic Leopard	40	-10
Stage 4	3	(Spain) Jordi Juvanteny	MAN	10	-0	3	(United States) Jamie Campbell	HySE-X1	40	-10
Stage 5	No stage					No stage				
Stage 6	1	(France) Jean-Michel Paulhe	Can-Am	20		1	(Spain) Jordi Juvanteny	MAN	60	
Stage 6	2	(Spain) Francisco Jose Gomez Pallas	Bat	12	-8	2	(France) Jean-Michel Paulhe	Can-Am	58	-2
Stage 6	3	(Spain) Jordi Juvanteny	MAN	10	-10	3	(China) Wenmin Su	Arctic Leopard	44	-16
Stage 7	1	(Spain) Jordi Juvanteny	MAN	25		1	(Spain) Jordi Juvanteny	MAN	85	
Stage 7	2	(France) Jean-Michel Paulhe	Can-Am	20	-5	2	(France) Jean-Michel Paulhe	Can-Am	78	-7
Stage 7	3	(China) Wenmin Su	Arctic Leopard	15	-10	3	(China) Wenmin Su	Arctic Leopard	59	-26
Stage 8	1	(China) Wenmin Su	Arctic Leopard	20		1	(Spain) Jordi Juvanteny	MAN	105	
Stage 8	2	(United States) Jamie Campbell	HySE-X1	20	-0	2	(France) Jean-Michel Paulhe	Can-Am	98	-7
Stage 8	3	(France) Jean-Michel Paulhe	Can-Am	20	-0	3	(China) Wenmin Su	Arctic Leopard	79	-26
Stage 9	1	(France) Jean-Michel Paulhe	Can-Am	20		1	(Spain) Jordi Juvanteny	MAN	125	
Stage 9	2	(Spain) Jordi Juvanteny	MAN	20	-0	2	(France) Jean-Michel Paulhe	Can-Am	118	-7
Stage 9	3	(China) Wenmin Su	Arctic Leopard	15	-5	3	(China) Wenmin Su	Arctic Leopard	94	-31
Stage 10	1	(Spain) Jordi Juvanteny	MAN	20		1	(Spain) Jordi Juvanteny	MAN	145	
Stage 10	2	(France) Willy Jobard	Arctic Leopard	15	-5	2	(France) Jean-Michel Paulhe	Can-Am	133	-12
Stage 10	3	(China) Wenmin Su	Arctic Leopard	15	-5	3	(China) Wenmin Su	Arctic Leopard	109	-36
Stage 11	1	(China) Wenmin Su	Arctic Leopard	15		1	(Spain) Jordi Juvanteny	MAN	155	
Stage 11	2	(United States) Jamie Campbell	HySE-X1	15	-0	2	(France) Jean-Michel Paulhe	Can-Am	143	-12
Stage 11	3	(France) Sylvain Espinasse	Tacita	10	-5	3	(China) Wenmin Su	Arctic Leopard	124	-31
Stage 12	1	(Spain) Jordi Juvanteny	MAN	25		1	(Spain) Jordi Juvanteny	MAN	180	
Stage 12	2	(United States) Jamie Campbell	HySE-X1	20	-5	2	(France) Jean-Michel Paulhe	Can-Am	163	-17
Stage 12	3	(France) Jean-Michel Paulhe	Can-Am	20	-5	3	(China) Wenmin Su	Arctic Leopard	134	-46

== Final standings ==
=== Bikes ===
Final standings (positions 1–10)
Rank	Rider	Bike	Time	Difference
1	(United States) Ricky Brabec	Honda CRF450 Rally	51:30:08	
2	(Botswana) Ross Branch	Hero 450 Rally	51:41:01	+0:10:53
3	(France) Adrien Van Beveren	Honda CRF450 Rally	51:42:33	+0:12:25
4	(Argentina) Kevin Benavides	KTM 450 Rally Factory Replica	52:08:56	+0:38:48
5	(Australia) Toby Price	KTM 450 Rally Factory Replica	52:15:36	+0:45:28
6	(Chile) José Ignacio Cornejo	Honda CRF450 Rally	52:16:46	+0:46:38
7	(Argentina) Luciano Benavides	Husqvarna 450 Rally Factory Replica	52:23:39	+0:53:31
8	(Australia) Daniel Sanders	Gas Gas 450 Rally Factory Replica	52:44:40	+1:14:32
9	(Slovakia) Štefan Svitko	KTM 450 Rally Factory Replica	53:26:36	+1:56:28
10	(Czech Republic) Martin Michek	KTM 450 Rally Replica	54:18:57	+2:48:49

Final standings (positions 11–96)
Rank	Rider	Bike	Time	Difference
11	(India) Harith Noah	Sherco 450 SEF Rally	54:24:44	+2:54:36
12	(France) Romain Dumontier	Husqvarna 450 Rally	54:29:41	+2:59:33
13	(South Africa) Bradley Cox	KTM 450 Rally Replica	54:31:12	+3:01:04
14	(France) Jean-Loup Lepan	KTM 450 Rally Replica	54:43:07	+3:12:59
15	(Slovenia) Toni Mulec	KTM 450 Rally Replica	54:53:29	+3:23:21
16	(France) Mathieu Doveze	KTM 450 Rally Factory Replica	54:56:38	+3:26:30
17	(Chile) Pablo Quintanilla	Honda CRF450 Rally	57:06:47	+5:36:39
18	(Portugal) Antonio Maio	Yamaha WR450F Rally	57:48:33	+6:18:25
19	(Argentina) Diego Gamaliel Llanos	KTM 450 Rally Replica	57:58:46	+6:28:38
20	(Austria) Tobias Ebster	KTM 450 Rally Replica	58:17:00	+6:46:52
21	(South Africa) Charan Moore	Husqvarna 450 Rally	58:35:08	+7:05:00
22	(Czech Republic) Milan Engel	KTM 450 Rally Replica	58:56:58	+7:26:50
23	(Romania) Emanuel Gyenes	KTM 450 Rally Replica	59:02:11	+7:32:03
24	(Poland) Konrad Dabrowski	KTM 450 Rally Replica	59:30:02	+7:59:54
25	(Belgium) Jérôme Martiny	Husqvarna 450 Rally	60:22:22	+8:52:14
26	(France) Benjamin Melot	KTM 450 Rally Replica	60:34:20	+9:04:12
27	(Czech Republic) Jan Brabec	KTM 450 Rally Replica	61:00:08	+9:30:00
28	(Portugal) Bruno Santos	Husqvarna 450 Rally	61:12:16	+9:42:08
29	(Portugal) Mario Patrão	KTM 450 Rally Replica	61:22:55	+9:52:47
30	(France) Charlie Herbst	Gas Gas 450 Rally Replica	62:45:13	+11:15:05
31	(France) Jeremy Miroir	Fantic XEF Rally 450	62:52:59	+11:22:51
32	(Zimbabwe) Ashley Thixton	Husqvarna 450 Rally	63:21:19	+11:51:11
33	(France) Jérôme Bas	KTM 450 Rally Replica	63:57:58	+12:27:50
34	(Spain) Albert Martin Garcia	Husqvarna 450 Rally	64:21:17	+12:51:09
35	(Spain) Josep Pedró Subirats	Husqvarna 450 Rally	65:32:59	+14:02:51
36	(France) Julien Dalbec	KTM 450 Rally Replica	65:40:32	+14:10:24
37	(Chile) Tomás de Gavardo	KTM 450 Rally Replica	66:15:13	+14:45:05
38	(Argentina) Juan Santiago Rostan	KTM 450 Rally Replica	66:21:17	+14:51:09
39	(Denmark) Thomas Kongshøj	KTM 450 Rally Replica	67:16:55	+15:46:47
40	(Czech Republic) David Pabiška	KTM 450 Rally Replica	67:21:38	+15:51:30
41	(Czech Republic) Martin Prokeš	KTM 450 Rally Replica	67:21:52	+15:51:44
42	(France) Mathieu Girard	KTM 450 Rally Replica	67:53:45	+16:23:37
43	(Ecuador) Juan Puga	KTM 450 Rally Replica	68:13:21	+16:43:13
44	(Italy) Gioele Meoni	KTM 450 Rally Replica	68:52:40	+17:22:32
45	(United Kingdom) Jane Daniels	Fantic XEF Rally 450	69:45:02	+18:14:54
46	(United Kingdom) David McBride	Husqvarna 450 Rally	69:57:42	+18:27:34
47	(China) Fang Xiangling	Kove 450 Rally	70:03:55	+18:33:47
48	(France) Jérémie Gerber	KTM 450 Rally Replica	70:12:19	+18:42:11
49	(Czech Republic) Libor Podmol	Husqvarna 450 Rally	71:37:07	+20:06:59
50	(China) Zhang Min	KTM 450 Rally Replica	73:13:01	+21:42:53
51	(Poland) Bartłomiej Tabin	KTM 450 Rally Replica	73:18:11	+21:48:03
52	(Spain) Josep Martí Suñer	Gas Gas 450 Rally Replica	74:01:24	+22:31:16
53	(Belgium) Joris Van Dyck	Husqvarna 450 Rally	74:28:50	+22:58:42
54	(Republic of Ireland) Oran O’Kelly	Husqvarna 450 Rally	75:07:28	+23:37:20
55	(France) Guillaume Chollet	KTM 450 Rally Replica	76:18:17	+24:48:09
56	(Japan) Yoshio Ikemachi	KTM 450 Rally Replica	76:21:48	+24:51:40
57	(South Africa) Ronald Venter	KTM 450 Rally Replica	77:02:24	+25:32:16
58	(South Africa) Stuart Gregory	KTM 450 Rally Replica	77:12:48	+25:42:40
59	(United States) Kyle McCoy	KTM 450 Rally Replica	78:09:34	+26:39:26
60	(Portugal) Alexandre Azinhais	KTM 450 Rally Replica	78:24:10	+26:54:02
61	(France) Fabien Domas	Gas Gas 450 Rally Replica	78:32:34	+27:02:26
62	(France) Romain Duchêne	KTM 450 Rally Replica	78:35:57	+27:05:49
63	(Belgium) Pierre Saeys	Husqvarna 450 Rally	78:42:08	+27:12:00
64	(France) Andy Beaucoud	Husqvarna 450 Rally	78:44:25	+27:14:17
65	(France) Anthony Fabre	KTM 450 EXC	78:49:55	+27:19:47
66	(France) Loïs d'Abbadie	Husqvarna 450 Rally	79:09:30	+27:39:22
67	(Italy) Tiziano Interno	Gas Gas 450 Rally Replica	79:28:17	+27:58:09
68	(Spain) Javier Amat de Caralt	Gas Gas 450 Rally Replica	81:03:17	+29:33:09
69	(Argentina) Sebastián Urquía	KTM 450 Rally Replica	81:19:36	+29:49:28
70	(France) Vincent Biau	Husqvarna 450 Rally	81:53:57	+30:23:49
71	(United States) Weston Carr	Husqvarna 450 Rally	82:02:46	+30:32:38
72	(France) Max Bianucci	Husqvarna 450 Rally	82:08:43	+30:38:35
73	(Spain) Carlos Llibre	Gas Gas 450 Rally Replica	83:05:20	+31:35:12
74	(Spain) Eduardo Iglesias Sánchez	KTM 450 Rally Replica	83:40:29	+32:10:21
75	(Mongolia) Ganzorig Chuluun	Husqvarna 450 Rally	84:11:19	+32:41:11
76	(France) Thierry Béthys	Honda CRF450 Rally	86:20:49	+34:50:41
77	(Greece) Vasileios Boudros	Husqvarna 450 Rally	91:44:37	+40:14:29
78	(Italy) Cesare Zacchetti	Kove 450 Rally	91:58:40	+40:28:32
79	(France) Sébastien Herbet	Husqvarna 450 Rally	92:15:27	+40:45:19
80	(Chile) John William Medina Salazar	KTM 450 Rally Replica	93:35:20	+42:05:12
81	(Spain) Javi Vega	Yamaha WR450F Rally	99:06:13	+47:35:05
82	(Spain) Mario Garrido	KTM 450 Rally Replica	99:34:34	+48:04:26
83	(Saudi Arabia) Abdulhalim Al-Mogheera	KTM 450 Rally Replica	102:39:52	+51:09:44
84	(Spain) Rachid Al-Lal Lahadil	Husqvarna 450 Rally	103:16:18	+51:46:10
85	(Mexico) Hector Guerrero	Husqvarna 450 Rally	104:10:20	+52:40:12
86	(United States) Jacob Argubright	KTM 450 Rally Replica	106:55:18	+55:25:10
87	(France) Amaury Baratin	KTM 450 Rally Factory Replica	110:30:53	+59:00:45
88	(Portugal) Gad Nachmani	KTM 450 Rally Replica	116:11:38	+64:41:30
89	(Czech Republic) Dušan Drdaj	KTM 450 Rally Replica	119:42:17	+68:12:09
90	(Italy) Tommaso Montanari	Fantic XEF Rally 450	122:38:19	+71:08:11
91	(France) James Simonin	Husqvarna 450 Rally	123:59:27	+72:29:19
92	(China) Sunier Sunier	Kove 450 Rally	135:41:54	+84:11:46
93	(Uruguay) Fabián von Thuengen	Husqvarna 450 Rally	175:49:34	+124:19:26
94	(France) Neels Theric	Kove 450 Rally	177:29:19	+125:59:11
95	(Morocco) Mohamed Aoulad Ali	KTM 450 EXC	194:20:43	+142:50:35
96	(Spain) Javier Campos Dono	KTM 450 Rally Replica	196:25:45	+144:55:37

=== Quads ===
Final standings (positions 1–7)
Rank	Rider	Bike	Time	Difference
1	(Argentina) Manuel Andújar	Yamaha Raptor 700R	64:16:53	
2	(France) Alexandre Giroud	Yamaha Raptor 700R	64:24:52	+0:07:59
3	(Slovakia) Juraj Varga	Yamaha Raptor 700R	68:20:18	+4:03:25
4	(Lithuania) Laisvydas Kancius	Yamaha Raptor 700R	71:30:38	+7:13:45
5	(Lithuania) Antanas Kanopkinas	CFMoto CFORCE 1000	113:25:50	+49:08:57
6	(France) Samuel Desbuisson	Yamaha Raptor 700R	192:42:55	+128:26:02
7	(Saudi Arabia) Hani Al-Noumesi	Yamaha Raptor 700R	200:03:28	+135:46:35

=== Cars ===
Final standings (positions 1–10)
Rank	Driver	Co-Driver	Car	Time	Difference
1	(Spain) Carlos Sainz	(Spain) Lucas Cruz	Audi RS Q e-tron	48:15:18	
2	(Belgium) Guillaume De Mévius	(France) Xavier Panseri	Toyota Hilux Overdrive	49:35:43	+1:20:25
3	(France) Sébastien Loeb	(France) Fabian Lurquin	Prodrive Hunter T1+	49:44:30	+1:29:12
4	(France) Guerlain Chicherit	(France) Alex Winocq	Toyota Hilux Overdrive	49:51:17	+1:35:59
5	(Czech Republic) Martin Prokop	(Czech Republic) Viktor Chytka	Ford Raptor RS Cross Country	50:32:01	+2:16:43
6	(South Africa) Guy Botterill	(South Africa) Brett Cummings	Toyota GR DKR Hilux	50:55:51	+2:40:33
7	(South Africa) Giniel de Villiers	(South Africa) Dennis Murphy	Toyota GR DKR Hilux	51:05:44	+2:50:26
8	(Lithuania) Benediktas Vanagas	(Estonia) Kuldar Sikk	Toyota GR DKR Hilux	51:12:35	+2:57:17
9	(Brazil) Lucas Moraes	(Spain) Armand Monleón	Toyota GR DKR Hilux	51:18:30	+3:03:12
10	(France) Mathieu Serradori	(France) Loïc Minaudier	Century CR6-T	51:19:30	+3:04:12

Final standings (positions 11–52)
Rank	Driver	Co-Driver	Car	Time	Difference
11	(Kyrgyzstan) Denis Krotov	Konstantin Zhiltsov	Toyota Hilux Overdrive	51:54:31	+3:39:13
12	(France) Christian Lavieille	(France) Valentin Sarreaud	MD Rallye Sport Optimus	52:36:09	+4:20:51
13	(Brazil) Cristian Baumgart	(Brazil) Alberto Andreotti	Prodrive Hunter T1+	52:37:17	+4:21:59
14	(France) Romain Dumas	(France) Max Delfino	Toyota GR DKR Hilux	52:48:29	+4:33:11
15	(Spain) Laia Sanz	(Italy) Maurizio Gerini	Astara CR6-T	53:09:04	+4:53:46
16	(South Africa) Saood Variawa	(France) François Cazalet	Toyota GR GKR Hilux	54:09:59	+5:54:41
17	(France) Jérôme Pelichet	(France) Pascal Larroque	MD Rallye Sport Optimus	54:51:14	+6:35:56
18	(Argentina) Juan Cruz Yacopini	(Spain) Daniel Oliveras	Toyota Hilux Overdrive	57:41:00	+9:25:42
19	(France) Ronan Chabot	(France) Giles Pillot	Toyota Hilux Overdrive	58:38:40	+10:23:22
20	(France) Lionel Baud	(France) Lucie Baud	Toyota Hilux Overdrive	59:17:26	+11:02:08
21	(France) François Cousin	(France) Stéphane Cousin	MD Rallye Sport Optimus	59:59:41	+11:44:23
22	(Netherlands) Tim Coronel	(Netherlands) Tom Coronel	Century CR6	61:35:43	+13:20:25
23	(Czech Republic) Karel Trneny	(Czech Republic) Michal Ernst	Ford F-150 Evo	62:14:51	+13:59:33
24	(Italy) Andrea Schiumarini	(Italy) Andrea Succi	Century CR6	62:18:20	+14:03:02
25	(Seychelles) Aliyyah Koloc	(France) Sébastien Delaunay	Red-Lined Revo+	62:24:51	+14:09:33
26	(Sweden) Mattias Ekström	(Sweden) Emil Bergkvist	Audi RS Q e-tron	63:34:57	+15:19:39
27	(France) Benoit Fretin	(France) Cédric Duple	Century CR6	63:48:20	+15:33:02
28	(Lithuania) Gintas Petrus	(Portugal) Jose Marques	MD Rallye Sport Optimus	64:29:22	+16:14:04
29	(Netherlands) Maik Willems	(Netherlands) Robert van Pelt	Toyota Gazoo Racing Hilux	64:58:30	+16:43:12
30	(France) Stéphane Peterhansel	(France) Édouard Boulanger	Audi RS Q e-tron	65:40:30	+17:25:12
31	(Italy) Eugenio Amos	(Italy) Paolo Ceci	Toyota Hilux Overdrive	65:56:36	+17:41:18
32	(Switzerland) Alexandre Pesci	(Switzerland) Stephan Kuhni	Toyota GR DKR Hilux	68:03:59	+19:48:41
33	(France) Jean-Philippe Beziat	(France) Vincent Albira	MD Rallye Sport Optimus	68:15:01	+19:59:43
34	(Belgium) Stefan Carmans	(Netherlands) Antonius van Tiel	Red-Lined Revo+	69:42:47	+21:27:29
35	(Switzerland) Cédric Goumaz	(France) Pascal Delacour	MD Rallye Sport Optimus	73:24:32	+25:09:14
36	(Spain) Isidre Esteve	(Spain) Jose Maria Villalobos	Toyota Hilux Overdrive	78:23:07	+30:07:49
37	(China) Zi Yungang	(China) Pan Hongyu	Prodrive Hunter T1+	96:51:01	+48:36:43
38	(South Africa) Brian Baragwanath	(South Africa) Leonard Cremer	Century CR7-T	104:40:28	+56:25:10
39	(Czech Republic) Tomas Ourednicek	(Czech Republic) David Kripal	Toyta GR DKR Hilux	111:32:29	+63:17:11
40	(France) Jean-Rémy Bergounhe	(France) Lionel Costes	MD Rallye Sport Optimus	111:37:14	+63:21:56
41	(France) Jean-Luc Ceccaldi	(France) Thomas Gaidella	MD Rallye Sport Optimus	112:16:56	+64:01:38
42	(United States) Seth Quintero	(Germany) Dennis Zenz	Toyota GR DKR Hilux	117:20:01	+69:04:43
43	(China) Sun Xiangyan	(China) Tian Yu	SMG HW2023	122:57:54	+74:42:36
44	(Spain) Nani Roma	(Spain) Alex Haro	Ford Ranger	130:32:18	+82:17:00
45	(Poland) Magdalena Zając	(Poland) Jacek Czachor	Toyota Gazoo Racing Hilux	133:14:17	+84:58:59
46	(South Africa) Gareth Woolridge	(South Africa) Boyd Dreyer	Ford Ranger	135:23:13	+87:07:55
47	(Poland) Krzysztof Hołowczyc	(Poland) Łukasz Kurzeja	Mini John Cooper Works Rally Plus	137:12:03	+88:56:45
48	(France) Pascal Thomasse	(France) Arnold Brucy	MD Rallye Sport Optimus	141:43:17	+93:27:59
49	(Lithuania) Vladas Jurkevicius	(Lithuania) Aisvydas Paliukenas	Toyota GR DKR Hilux	143:04:41	+94:49:23
50	(France) Jérôme Gambier	(France) Philippe Gosselin	MD Rallye Sport Optimus	152:12:46	+103:57:28
51	(France) Dominique Housieaux	(France) Delphine Delfino	Century CR6	155:24:14	+107:08:56
52	(Lithuania) Vaidotas Žala	(Portugal) Paulo Fiuza	Mini John Cooper Works Rally Plus	158:23:03	+110:07:45

=== Challenger (T3) ===
Final standings (positions 1–10)
Rank	Driver	Co-Driver	Car	Time	Difference
1	(Spain) Cristina Gutiérrez	(Spain) Pablo Moreno Huete	Taurus T3 Max	53:59:47	
2	(United States) Mitch Guthrie	(United States) Kellon Walch	Taurus T3 Max	54:36:33	+0:36:46
3	(Lithuania) Rokas Baciuška	(Spain) Oriol Vidal Montijano	Can-Am Maverick XRS Turbo	54:58:34	+0:58:47
4	(Chile) Francisco López Contardo	(Chile) Juan Pablo Latrach Vinagre	Can-Am Maverick XRS Turbo	55:11:07	+1:11:20
5	(United States) Austin Jones	(Brazil) Gustavo Gugelmin	Can-Am Maverick XRS Turbo	55:44:34	+1:44:47
6	(Saudi Arabia) Saleh Alsaif	(Qatar) Nasser Al-Kuwari	GRally OT3	57:11:14	+3:11:27
7	(Brazil) Marcelo Gastaldi	(Brazil) Carlos Sachs	Taurus T3-Max	57:53:35	+3:53:48
8	(Portugal) Ricardo Porém	(Argentina) Agusto Sanz	Can-Am MMP T3 Rally Raid	58:46:29	+4:46:42
9	(Argentina) Nicolás Cavigliasso	(Argentina) Valentina Pertegarini	Taurus T3-Max	60:36:06	+6:36:19
10	(Netherlands) Paul Spierings	(Netherlands) Jan-Pieter van der Stelt	Can-Am Maverick X3	61:38:22	+7:38:35

Final standings (positions 11–28)
Rank	Driver	Co-Driver	Car	Time	Difference
11	(Paraguay) Oscar Santos Peralta	(Brazil) Lourival Roldan	Can-Am Maverick X3	64:32:45	+10:32:45
12	(Spain) Pedro Manuel Peñate Muñoz	(Spain) Rosa Romero Font	Can-Am Maverick XRS Turbo	64:50:39	+10:50:52
13	(Portugal) João Monteiro	(Portugal) Nuno Morais	Can-Am Maverick XRS Turbo	65:55:53	+11:56:06
14	(France) Christophe Cresp	(France) Jean Brucy	MMP Rally Raid	66:47:53	+12:48:06
15	(Austria) Lukas Lauda	(Germany) Stefan Henken	Can-Am Maverick XRS Turbo	67:18:33	+13:18:46
16	(Spain) Oscar Ral Verdu	(Spain) Xavier Blanco García	Can-Am Maverick X3	68:37:45	+14:37:58
17	(Italy) Camelia Liparoti	(Guatemala) Rodolfo Guillioli	GRally OT3	69:29:34	+15:29:47
18	(Spain) Xavier Foj	(Spain) Antonio Angulo	Oryx T3	74:08:25	+20:08:38
19	(Germany) Annett Quandt	(Sweden) Annie Seel	Yamaha X-Raid XYZ 1000R Turbo Prototype	76:15:30	+22:15:43
20	(Netherlands) Gert-Jan Van Der Valk	(Netherlands) Branco De Lange	Arcane T3	90:01:09	+36:01:22
21	(Colombia) Javier Vélez	(Argentina) Gaston Ariel Mattarucco	Can-Am Maverick X3	97:20:44	+43:20:57
22	(Brazil) Gunter Hinkelmann	(Brazil) Fabrizio Bianchini	Taurus T3 Max	97:20:56	+43:21:09
23	(Netherlands) Jeffrey Otten	(Netherlands) Olaf Harmsen	Can-Am Maverick X3	99:10:11	+45:10:24
24	(France) Benjamin Lattard	(France) Patrick Jimbert	MMP Rally Raid	100:28:33	+46:28:46
25	(Portugal) Mário Franco	(Portugal) Daniel Jordão	Yamaha XYZ 1000R	107:46:32	+53:46:45
26	(Australia) Glenn Brinkman	(Australia) Dale Moscatt	PH-Sport Zephyr	122:13:23	+68:13:36
27	(Saudi Arabia) Dania Akeel	(France) Stéphane Duplé	Taurus T3 Max	133:41:27	+79:41:40
28	(Argentina) David Zille	(Argentina) Sebastian Cesana	Can-Am Maverick XRS Turbo	135:01:17	+81:01:30

=== SSV (T4) ===
Final standings (positions 1–10)
Rank	Driver	Co-Driver	Car	Time	Difference
1	(France) Xavier de Soultrait	(France) Martin Bonnet	Polaris RZR Pro R	56:37:43	
2	(Switzerland) Jérôme de Sadeleer	(France) Michaël Metge	Can-Am Maverick XRS Turbo	56:40:08	+0:02:25
3	(Saudi Arabia) Yasir Seaidan	(France) Adrien Metge	Can-Am Maverick XRS Turbo	57:42:11	+1:04:28
4	(United States) Sara Price	(United States) Jeremy Gray	Can-Am Maverick XRS Turbo	57:48:58	+1:11:15
5	(Portugal) João Ferreira	(Portugal) Filipe Palmeiro	Can-Am Maverick XRS Turbo	57:56:35	1:18:52
6	(Ecuador) Sebastian Guayasamin	(Argentina) Fernando Acosta	Can-Am Maverick XRS Turbo	60:20:44	+3:43:01
7	(Brazil) Cristiano Batista	(Spain) Fausto Mota	Can-Am Maverick XRS Turbo	61:10:31	+4:32:48
8	(Spain) Gerard Farrés	(Spain) Diego Ortega	Can-Am Maverick XRS Turbo	61:20:04	+4:42:21
9	(Lithuania) Emilija Gelažninkienė	(Lithuania) Arūnas Gelažninkas	Can-Am Maverick XRS Turbo	67:44:45	+11:07:02
10	(France) Florent Vayssade	(France) Nicolas Rey	Polaris RZR Pro R	67:53:35	+11:15:52

Final standings (positions 11–26)
Rank	Driver	Co-Driver	Car	Time	Difference
11	(Spain) Ricardo Ramilo Suarez	(Spain) Marc Sola Terradellas	Can-Am Maverick XRS Turbo	68:10:44	+11:33:01
12	(Italy) Enrico Gaspari	(Argentina) Facundo Jaton	Polaris RZR Pro R	68:52:36	+12:14:53
13	(Italy) Cristina Giampaoli	(Argentina) Ricardo Torlaschi	Can-Am Maverick XRS Turbo	70:57:22	+14:19:39
14	(Brazil) Jorge Wagernfuhr	(Brazil) Humberto Ribeiro	Polaris RZR Pro R	71:55:15	+15:17:32
15	(Netherlands) Martijn van den Broek	(Netherlands) Jan Paul van der Poel	Can-Am Maverick XRS Turbo	74:55:36	+18:17:53
16	(Spain) Eduardo Pons	(Spain) Jaume Betriu	Can-Am Maverick XRS Turbo	75:02:13	+18:24:30
17	(Netherlands) Andre Thewessen	(Ukraine) Dmytro Tsyro	Can-Am Maverick XRS Turbo	78:27:47	+21:50:04
18	(France) Jérémie Renou	(France) Nicolas Larroquet	Can-Am Maverick XRS Turbo	79:06:12	+22:28:29
19	(Mexico) Daniel Gonzalez Reina	(Mexico) Jorge Hernandez Calva	Polaris RZR Pro R	79:06:37	+22:28:54
20	(Japan) Shinsuke Umeda	(Italy) Maurizio Dominella	Polaris RZR Pro R	86:10:14	+29:32:31
21	(Netherlands) Sander Derikx	(Netherlands) Ruud Vollebregt	Can-Am Maverick XRS Turbo	86:19:18	+29:41:35
22	(Italy) Rebecca Busi	(Uruguay) Sergio Lafuente	Can-Am Maverick XRS Turbo	119:03:56	+62:26:13
23	(France) Benoît Lepietre	(France) Benoît Bonnefoi	Can-Am Maverick XRS Turbo	120:39:50	+64:02:07
24	(Brazil) Rodrigo Varela	(Brazil) Enio Bozzano Jr	Can-Am Maverick XRS Turbo	130:21:23	+73:43:40
25	(Poland) Grzegorz Brochocki	(Poland) Grzegorz Komar	Can-Am Maverick XRS Turbo	143:28:28	+86:50:45
26	(Spain) Jose Vidaña	(Spain) Dani Camara	Can-Am Maverick XRS Turbo	183:36:59	+126:59:16

=== Trucks ===
Final standings (positions 1–10)
Rank	Driver	Co-Driver	Technician	Truck	Time	Difference
1	(Czech Republic) Martin Macík	(Czech Republic) František Tomášek	(Czech Republic) David Švanda	Iveco PowerStar	54:34:48	
2	(Czech Republic) Aleš Loprais	(Czech Republic) Jaroslav Valtr Jr	(Czech Republic) Jiří Stross	Praga V4S DKR	56:29:27	+1:54:39
3	(Netherlands) Mitchel van den Brink	(Netherlands) Jarno van de Pol	(Spain) Moises Torrallardona	Iveco PowerStar	59:04:14	+4:29:26
4	(Netherlands) Janus van Kasteren	(Poland) Darek Rodewald	(Netherlands) Marcel Snijders	Iveco PowerStar	59:56:52	+5:22:04
5	(Netherlands) Michiel Becx	(Netherlands) Wulfert van Ginkel	(Netherlands) Edwin Kuijpers	Iveco PowerStar	66:09:20	+11:34:32
6	(Japan) Teruhito Sugawara	(Japan) Hirokazu Somemiya	(Japan) Yuji Mochizuki	Hino 600-Hybrid	71:57:42	+17:22:54
7	(Italy) Claudio Bellina	(Italy) Bruno Gotti	(Italy) Marco Aarnoletti	Iveco PowerStar	73:07:22	+18:32:34
8	(Netherlands) Ben de Groot	(Netherlands) Govert Boogaard	(Netherlands) Ad Hofmans	Iveco PowerStar	75:01:26	+20:26:38
9	(Netherlands) Richard de Groot	(Netherlands) Jan Hulsebosch	(Netherlands) Martijn Johannes Martinus van Rooij	Iveco PowerStar	101:36:17	+47:01:29
10	(Netherlands) Pascal de Baar	(Netherlands) Gijsbert Verschoor	(Czech Republic) Tomáš Šikola	Tatra Buggyra	110:40:35	+56:05:47

Final standings (positions 11–20)
Rank	Driver	Co-Driver	Technician	Truck	Time	Difference
11	(Netherlands) Gert Huzink	(Netherlands) Rob Buursen	(Netherlands) Martin Roesink	Renault C460 Hybrid	115:41:59	+61:07:11
12	(Netherlands) Anja Van Loon	(Netherlands) Marije van Ettekoven	(Netherlands) Floor Maten	Iveco PowerStar	117:21:01	+62:46:13
13	(Czech Republic) Michal Valtr	(Slovakia) Jaroslav Miškolci	(Czech Republic) Radim Kaplanek	Iveco PowerStar	118:31:21	+63:56:33
14	(Hungary) Miklós Kovács	(Hungary) Péter Czeglédi	(Hungary) László Ács	Scania Qualisport Hyena	119:51:49	+65:17:01
15	(Netherlands) Gerrit Zuurmond	(Netherlands) Tjeerd Van Ballegooy	(Netherlands) Klaas Kwakkel	MAN TGA	124:12:54	+69:38:06
16	(Italy) Gianandrea Pellegrinelli	(Italy) Giulio Minelli	(Italy) Carlo Galdini	Iveco PowerStar	134:04:56	+79:30:08
17	(Andorra) Albert Llovera	(Andorra) Margot Llobera	(Spain) Marc Torres	Ford Cargo 4X4	143:42:39	+89:07:51
18	(Czech Republic) Jaroslav Valtr	(Czech Republic) Rene Kilian	(Czech Republic) David Kilian	Tatra Phoenix	146:56:30	+92:21:42
19	(Netherlands) Martin van den Brink	(Netherlands) Rijk Mouw	(Belgium) Jan van der Vaet	Iveco T-Way	153:52:19	+99:17:31
20	(Czech Republic) Daniel Stiblik	(Czech Republic) Lukáš Kvasnica	(Czech Republic) Jiří Tomec	Tatra Phoenix	190:04:44	+135:29:56

=== Classics ===
Final standings (positions 1–10)
Rank	Driver	Co-Driver	Technician	Vehicle	Points	Difference
1	(Spain) Carlos Santaolalla	(Spain) Jan Rosa i Viñas	No technician	Toyota Land Cruiser	820	
2	(Italy) Lorenzo Traglio	(Italy) Rudy Briani	No technician	Nissan Pathfinder	832	+12
3	(Italy) Paolo Bedeschi	(Italy) Daniele Bottallo	No technician	Toyota BJ71	1061	+241
4	(Belgium) Dirk Van Rompuy	(Spain) Luis Barbero Garcia	No technician	Toyota HDJ 80	1646	+826
5	(France) Maxence Gublin	(France) Anthony Sousa	No technician	Land Rover Defender 110	1877	+1057
6	(Spain) Juan Morera	(Spain) Lidia Ruba	No technician	Porsche 959	1909	+1089
7	(Italy) Marco Ernesto Leva	(Italy) Alexia Giugni	No technician	Mitsubishi Pajero	2464	+1644
8	(Spain) Amadeo Roige Bragulat	(Spain) Jorge Toral	No technician	Toyota KZJ95	3134	+2314
9	(Spain) Rafael Lesmes Suarez	(Spain) Jose Luis Ruano Garcia	(Spain) Tabatha Romon	Mercedes 1844 AK	3455	+2635
10	(Croatia) Juraj Šebalj	(Croatia) Ivan Vidaković	No technician	Nissan Terrano II	3670	+2850

=== Mission 1000 ===
Final standings (positions 1–9)
Rank	Driver	Co-Driver	Technician	Vehicle	Points	Difference
1	(Spain) Jordi Juvanteny	(Spain) José Luis Criado	(Spain) Xavier Ribas	MAN TGA 26.480	180	
2	(France) Jean-Michel Paulhe	(France) Gauthier Gibert	No technician	Can-Am Maverick X3 XRC Hydrogen	163	-17
3	(China) Wenmin Su	No co-driver	No technician	Arctic Leopard E-XE880 Rally	134	-46
4	(United States) Jamie Campbell	(Argentina) Bruno Jacomy	No technician	HySE-X1	120	-60
5	(China) Gang Jun Cai	No co-driver	No technician	Arctic Leopard E-XE880 Rally	114	-66
6	(France) Willy Jobard	No co-driver	No technician	Arctic Leopard E-XE880 Rally	94	-86
7	(Netherlands) Dick Zuurmond	(Netherlands) Simon Koetsier	No technician	Volkswagen Amarok H2	92	-88
8	(France) Sylvain Espinasse	No co-driver	No technician	Tacita Discanto DKR	76	-104
9	(Italy) Oscar Polli	No co-driver	No technician	Tacita Discanto DKR	37	-143

== Incidents ==
Stage 1

- Near the start of stage 1, French driver Lionel Baud collided with a Russian spectator in a segment far from the race organizers' designated spectator area. The stage was briefly halted for the cars category while the spectator was evacuated to hospital, where he was diagnosed with a broken tibia and fibula from the impact.

Stage 2

- Near the end of stage 2, Spanish motorcyclist Carles Falcón suffered a major accident. Race director David Castera indicated that Falcón was initially found by medics with no pulse before being resuscitated and airlifted to hospital in Al-Dawadmi in serious condition. After arriving at hospital, Falcón was found to have a fractured C2 vertebra and to be suffering cerebral edema. Falcón was placed in an induced coma due to the injuries. Isaac Feliu, Falcón's teammate, withdrew from the rally following the accident. Falcón died from his injuries on 15 January. He was 45 years old.
