= Mathieu Serradori =

French rally-raid driver (born 1979)

- Nationality: (France) French
- Born: Mathieu Guillaume Serradori; 5 October 1979 (age 47) Fréjus, Var, France
- Current team: Century Racing Factory Team

Mathieu Guillaume Serradori (born 5 October 1979) is a French businessman and off-road racing driver. He leads an eponymous electrical service company in the public sector. Having contested the Dakar Rally on motorcycles in 2009, 2011, and 2012, Serradori switched to the car category at the end of the 2010s. He finished sixth overall in 2025 and 2026, driving a Century CR7.

== Racing career ==
Serradori debuted at the Dakar Rally at the hands of a Beta motorbike in 2009, finishing 51st. He returned to the event in 2011 and finished 21st with a Honda bike, before placing 25th with a KTM in 2012.

In 2014, Serradori switched to driving cars, partnering co-driver Patrick Antoniolli in the Rallye du Maroc. Driving a Predator X-18, Serradori claimed fifth overall. After finishing 15th at the same event in 2015, Serradori placed third in the Africa Eco Race at the start of 2016. He drove in four rounds of that year's FIA Cross Country Rally World Cup with the SRT Rally Team, winning the two-wheel drive class in Abu Dhabi and Italy. Serradori achieved further successes with SRT during the following years, including an overall win at the Africa Eco Race and third place in the Silk Way Rally — despite a windshield wiper failure — in 2018.

Serradori made his first appearance in the car class of the Dakar Rally in 2019, though he and longtime co-driver Fabien Lurquin retired during stage 4. In his only other rally-raid appearances of the year, Serradori became familiar with SRT's new chassis: the Century CR6, which he would go on to drive until 2023. His maiden Dakar start with the car came in 2020, one which included a stage win, beating Fernando Alonso to stage 8. He finished eighth overall. The following year, in his last start alongside Lurquin, Serradori ran third overall after stage 3 but suffered major setbacks during stage 6, eventually placing 44th. At the subsequent Rally Kazakhstan, Serradori was joined by new co-driver Loïc Minaudier. The pair made a positive impression at their first Dakar together, finishing seventh in 2022. That season they took part in two further rounds of the newly founded World Rally-Raid Championship, placing 18th in Abu Dhabi and ninth at the Andalucía Rally. For the 2023 Dakar, Serradori would be directly supported by Century Racing Factory, which provided him the updated Century CR6-T model. Serradori finished 12th overall, having run third overall after stage 2. A tenth place followed in 2024 - as Serradori won the class for two-wheel-drive cars.

After making his four-wheel-drive rally-raid debut in the Rallye du Maroc at the end of 2024, Serradori ran with the new Century CR7 at the 2025 Dakar Rally. He and Minaudier scored their best ever result at the event by finishing sixth. Serradori also won the Baja Morocco in preparation for the Rallye du Maroc in October 2025. At the FIA event meanwhile, a top-five challenge was ended by a mechanical failure during the final stage.

Serradori claimed his second Dakar stage win in 2026, having dominated stage 10. Thanks to a late charge to fend off 2025 W2RC champion Lucas Moraes, Serradori and Minaudier again finished sixth overall.

== Rally results ==
=== Dakar results ===
Year	Class	Vehicle	Position	Stages won
2009	Bike	(Italy) Beta	51st	0
2011	Bike	(Japan) Honda	21st	0
2012	Bike	(Austria) KTM	25th	0
2019	Car	(South Africa) Buggy	DNF	0
2020	Car	(South Africa) Century	8th	1
2021	Car	(South Africa) Century	44th	0
2022	Car	(South Africa) Century	7th	0
2023	Car	(South Africa) Century	12th	0
2024	Car	(South Africa) Century	10th	0
2025	Car	(South Africa) Century	6th	0
2026	Car	(South Africa) Century	6th	1

=== Complete World Rally-Raid Championship results ===
(key)

Year	Team	Car	Class	1	2	3	4	5	Pos.	Points
2022	SRT Racing	Century CR6	T1	DAK; 7^{33}	ABU; 18^{6}	MOR	AND; 9^{5}		7th	44
2023	Century Racing Factory Team	Century CR6-T	T1	DAK; 12^{22}	ABU	SON	DES	MOR	17th	22
2024	Century Racing Factory Team	Century CR6-T	Ultimate	DAK; 10^{32}	ABU	PRT	DES	MOR	14th	32
2025	Century Racing Factory Team	Century CR7	Ultimate	DAK; 6^{25}	ABU	ZAF; 46^{7}	PRT	MOR; 55^{3}	14th	35
2026	Century Racing Factory Team	Century CR7	Ultimate	DAK; 6^{27}	PRT	DES	MOR	ABU	6th*	27*

^{*}Season still in progress.
