= 2025 South Africa Safari Rally =

Off-road motorsport event in South Africa

Part of the 2025 World Rally-Raid Championship
← Previous event	Next event →
- Host country: South Africa
- Dates run: 19–24 May 2025
- Start: Sun City
- Finish: Sun City
- Stages: 5
- Stage surface: Sand, rocks, gravel, tarmac

Results
- Cars winner: (South Africa) Henk Lategan (South Africa) Brett Cummings; Toyota Gazoo Racing
- Bikes winner: (Australia) Daniel Sanders; Red Bull KTM Factory Racing
- Challenger winner: (Argentina) David Zille (Argentina) Sebastian Cesana; BBR Motorsport
- SSVs winner: (Portugal) Mário Franco (Portugal) João Miranda; Francosport
- Quads winner: (France) Gaëtan Martinez; CFMOTO Thunder Racing

The 2025 South Africa Safari Rally was a rally raid event based in South Africa. It was the maiden running of the South Africa Safari Rally and was centered around the Sun City Resort.

The event took place from 19 to 24 May 2025 and also counted as the third round of the 2025 World Rally-Raid Championship. The Cars category was won by the Toyota pair of Henk Lategan and Brett Cummings, meanwhile Daniel Sanders won the Bikes class.

== Background ==
The race format consisted of 6 days of racing, divided into 5 stages and a prologue.

=== Competitor list ===
Entry list – Bikes

No.	Driver	Bike	Team	Class
1	(Botswana) Ross Branch	Hero 450 Rally	Hero MotoSports Team Rally	RallyGP
4	(Australia) Daniel Sanders	KTM 450 Rally Factory	Red Bull KTM Factory Racing	RallyGP
9	(United States) Ricky Brabec	Honda CRF 450 Rally	Monster Energy Honda HRC	RallyGP
10	(United States) Skyler Howes	Honda CRF 450 Rally	Monster Energy Honda HRC	RallyGP
11	(Chile) José Ignacio Cornejo	Hero 450 Rally	Hero MotoSports Team Rally	RallyGP
12	(South Africa) Bradley Cox	Sherco SHR 450	Sherco TVS Rally Factory	RallyGP
42	(France) Adrien Van Beveren	Honda CRF 450 Rally	Monster Energy Honda HRC	RallyGP
68	(Spain) Tosha Schareina	Honda CRF 450 Rally	Monster Energy Honda HRC	RallyGP
77	(Argentina) Luciano Benavides	KTM 450 Rally Factory	Red Bull KTM Factory Racing	RallyGP
20	(India) Noah Harith Koitha Veettil	Sherco SHR 450	Sherco TVS Rally Factory	Rally2
22	(South Africa) Michael Docherty	KTM 450 Factory Replica	Bas World KTM Racing Team	Rally2
23	(United States) Nathan Rafferty	KTM 450 Factory Replica	Bas World KTM Racing Team	Rally2^{V}
24	(Poland) Filip Grot	KTM 450 Factory Replica	Bas World KTM Racing Team	Rally2^{J}
25	(Czech Republic) Libor Pletka	KTM 450 Factory Replica	Bas World KTM Racing Team	Rally2
26	(Poland) Konrad Dabrowski	KTM 450 Rally Replica	Duust Rally Team	Rally2^{J}
32	(Argentina) Gustavo Milutin	Husqvarna FR 450	HT Rally Raid	Rally2
33	(South Africa) Martin Camp	Kove XE 450 Rally		Rally2^{V}
34	(Italy) Massimo Camurri	Husqvarna FR 450	HT Rally Raid	Rally2
35	(Portugal) Pedro Pinheiro	Husqvarna FR 450 Rally		Rally2
36	(Netherlands) Ian Olthof	Husqvarna FR 450	HT Rally Raid	Rally2
41	(Chile) Ruy Barbosa	KTM 450 Rally Factory Replica	XRaids Experience	Rally2
43	(Argentina) Sebastian Urquia	KTM 450 Rally	XRaids Experience	Rally2^{V}
44	(India) Jatin Jain	Kove XE 450 Rally		Rally2^{MM}
45	(Chile) John Medina	KTM 450 Rally	XRaids Experience	Rally2
46	(South Africa) Martin Lourens	456 Factory Replica		Rally2
48	(Belgium) Xavier Gregoire	GasGas 450		Rally2^{MM}
49	(Argentina) Santiago Rostan	KTM 450 Rally	XRaids Experience	Rally2
50	(India) Yugandhar Prasad Jasti	Kove XE 450 Rally		Rally2^{V}
51	(South Africa) Mauritz Meiring	KTM 450 Rally		Rally2
52	(France) Benjamin Pousset	KTM 450 Rally Replica		Rally2^{MM}
55	(France) Florian Bancilhon	Yamaha 450 WRF		Rally2^{MM}
59	(Spain) Dominique Cizeau	KTM 450 Rally	XRaids Experience	Rally2^{V}
60	(France) Matthieu Jauffraud	KTM 450 Rally Replica		Rally2^{MM}
73	(Spain) Edgar Canet	KTM 450 Rally Factory	Red Bull KTM Factory Racing	Rally2^{J}
88	(Spain) Alex Torrao	Kove XE 450 Rally		Rally2
96	(Austria) Tobias Ebster	Husqvarna FE 450	Hero Motorsports Team Rally	Rally2

Entry list – Quads

No.	Driver	Bike	Team	Class
172	(Poland) Marek Loj	Yamaha 700 Raptor		Quad
173	(Lithuania) Antanas Kanopkinas	CFMoto CForce 1000	CFMoto Thunder Racing	Quad
174	(France) Gaëtan Martinez	CFMoto CForce 1000	CFMoto Thunder Racing	Quad
178	(South Africa) Carien Teessen	Yamaha 700 Raptor		Quad

Entry list – Cars

No.	Driver	Co-driver	Vehicle	Team	Class
200	(Qatar) Nasser Al-Attiyah	(France) Édouard Boulanger	Dacia Sandrider	The Dacia Sandriders	T1+
203	(Brazil) Lucas Moraes	(Spain) Armand Monleón	Toyota GR DKR Hilux	Toyota Gazoo Racing	T1+
204	(United States) Seth Quintero	(Germany) Dennis Zenz	Toyota GR DKR Hilux	Toyota Gazoo Racing	T1.+
205	(South Africa) Henk Lategan	(South Africa) Brett Cummings	Toyota GR DKR Hilux	Toyota Gazoo Racing	T1.+
206	(South Africa) Giniel de Villiers	(South Africa) Leander Pienaar	Toyota Hilux IMT	Team Hilux	T1.+
207	(Argentina) Juan Cruz Yacopini	(Spain) Daniel Oliveras	Toyota Hilux Overdrive	Overdrive Racing	T1.+
208	(South Africa) Brian Baragwanath	(South Africa) Leonard Cremer	Century CR7	Century Racing	T1.+
209	(France) Mathieu Serradori	(France) Loïc Minaudier	Century CR7-T	Team SRT	T1.+
210	(Netherlands) Rik van den Brink	(Netherlands) Gydo Heimans	Century CR7	Century Racing	T1.+
211	(South Africa) Guy Botterill	(South Africa) Dennis Murphy	Toyota Hilux IMT EVO	Toyota Gazoo Racing	T1.+
212	(South Africa) Saood Variawa	(France) François Cazalet	Toyota Hilux IMT EVO	Toyota Gazoo Racing	T1.+
217	(Kyrgyzstan) Denis Krotov	(Kyrgyzstan) Konstantin Zhiltsov	Toyota Hilux Overdrive	Overdrive Racing	T1.+
218	(Chile) Hernán Garcés	(Chile) Juan Pablo Latrach	Toyota Hilux Overdrive	Overdrive Racing	T1.+
219	(France) Sébastien Loeb	(Belgium) Fabian Lurquin	Dacia Sandrider	The Dacia Sandriders	T1.+
220	(Japan) Akira Miura	(France) Jean-Michel Polato	Toyota Hilux Overdrive	Overdrive Racing	T1.+
221	(Czech Republic) Martin Prokop	(Czech Republic) Viktor Chytka	Ford Raptor RS Cross Country	Orlen Jipocar Team	T1.+
222	(Belgium) Guillaume De Mévius	(France) Xavier Panseri	Mini JCW Rally 3.0i	X-raid Mini JCW Team	T1.+
223	(Netherlands) Rients Hofstra	(South Africa) Wade Harris	Red-Lined Revo GTR	Red-Lined	T1.+
225	(Spain) Carlos Sainz Sr.	(Spain) Lucas Cruz	Ford Raptor	Ford M-Sport	T1.+
227	(Spain) Nani Roma	(Spain) Alex Haro	Ford Raptor	Ford M-Sport	T1.+
229	(South Africa) Jayden Els	(South Africa) Johan Swemmer	Red-Lined Revo GTR	Red-Lined	T1.+
230	(Netherlands) Dave Klaassen	(Netherlands) Tessa Klaassen	Red-Lined Revo	Daklapack Rallysport	T1.+
231	(South Africa) Philip Botha	(South Africa) Roelof Janse van Vuren	Red-Lined Revo T1+	Red-Lined	T1.+
232	(South Africa) Danie Ludick	(South Africa) Denzil Williamson	Red-Lined Revo T1+	Red-Lined	T1.+
233	(South Africa) Gerhardt Heinlein	(South Africa) Rudi Heinlein	Red-Lined VK56	Red-Lined	T1.1
234	(South Africa) Nickus Heinlein	(South Africa) Jaco Kriel	Red-Lined VK50	Red-Lined	T1.1
235	(France) Benoît Fretin	(France) Cédric Duplé	Century CR6	Benoît Fretin	T1.1
239	(South Africa) Fouché Blignaut	(France) Bertus Blignaut	Toyota Hilux DKR	Team Hilux	T1.+
240	(Portugal) João Ferreira	(Portugal) Filipe Palmeiro	Mini JCW Rally 3.0i	X-raid Mini JCW Team	T1.+
242	(Germany) Daniel Schröder	(South Africa) Henry Carl Köhne	Volkswagen Wct Amarok	Ps Laser Racing	T1.+
243	(Germany) Jürgen Schröder	(South Africa) Stuart Gregory	Volkswagen Wct Amarok	Ps Laser Racing	T1.+
244	(South Africa) Johan van Staden	(South Africa) Sean van Staden	Renault Duster	KEC Racing	T1.1
245	(Australia) Jan Kraaij	(South Africa) Gerhard Schutte	Century CR6	Century Racing	T1.2
269	(South Africa) Johan de Bruyn	(South Africa) Adriaan Roets	Red-Lined VK56		T1.1
276	(Brazil) Marcos Baumgart	(Brazil) Kleber Cincea	Evo Plus	Neil Woolridge Motorsport	T1.+
277	(South Africa) Gareth Woolridge	(South Africa) Boyd Dreyer	Evo Plus	Neil Woolridge Motorsport	T1.+

Entry list – Challenger (T3)

No.	Driver	Co-driver	Vehicle	Team	Class
301	(Argentina) Nicolás Cavigliasso	(Argentina) Valentina Pertegarini	Taurus T3 Max	BBR Motorsport	T3.1
302	(Netherlands) Puck Klaassen	(South Africa) Charan Moore	GRallyTeam OT3	G Rally Team	T3.1
305	(Poland) Adam Kuś	(Ukraine) Dmytro Tsyro	Taurus T3 Max	Akpol Recykling Team	T3.1
306	(Qatar) Khalifa Al-Attiyah	(Argentina) Bruno Jacomy	Taurus T3 Max	Nasser Racing Team	T3.1
308	(Argentina) David Zille	(Argentina) Sebastian Cesana	Taurus T3 Max	BBR Motorsport	T3.1
310	(Saudi Arabia) Dania Akeel	(France) Stephane Duplé	Taurus T3 Max	BBR Motorsport	T3.1
320	(Spain) Pau Navarro	(Spain) Jan Rosa i Vinas	Taurus T3 Max	BBR Motorsport	T3.1

Entry list – SSV (T4)

No.	Driver	Co-driver	Vehicle	Team	Class
401	(Portugal) Alexandre Pinto	(Portugal) Bernardo Oliveira	BRP Can-Am Maverick XRS Turbo RR	Old Friends Rally Team	T4
402	(Italy) Enrico Gaspari	(Portugal) Fausto Mota	BRP Can-Am Maverick XRS Turbo RR	MMP	T4
403	(Italy) Michele Cinotto	(Italy) Maurizio Dominella	Polaris RZR Pro R Sport	CST XTreme Plus Polaris Team	T4
404	(France) Claude Fournier	(France) Patrick Jimbert	BRP Can-Am Maverick XRS Turbo RR	MMP	T4
407	(Portugal) Mário Franco	(Portugal) João Miranda	BRP Can-Am Maverick R	Francosport	SSV1
410	(United Kingdom) Graham Knight	(United Kingdom) David Watson	Polaris RZR Pro R Sport	CST XTreme Plus Polaris Team	T4
411	(United Kingdom) George Halles	(France) Max Delfino	Polaris RZR Pro R Sport	CST XTreme Plus Polaris Team	T4
413	(Portugal) José Nogueira	(Portugal) Arcelio Couto	BRP Can-Am Maverick XRS Turbo RR	Old Friends Rally Team	T4
414	(United Kingdom) Richard Aczel	(Netherlands) Wouter Rosegaar	BRP Can-Am Maverick R	South Racing Can-Am	SSV1
415	(Spain) Domingo Román	(Spain) Gustavo Ibeas	Polaris RZR Pro R Sport	TH-Trucks Team	T4
416	(Spain) José Ignacio Gayoso	(Spain) Ramiro Santiago	Polaris RZR Pro R Sport	TH-Trucks Team	T4

== Stages ==
Stage	Date		Start	Finish	Total/Special
Prologue	Monday	May 19, 2025	Sun City	Sun City	35 km / 9 km
1	Tuesday	May 20, 2025	Sun City	Sun City	555 km / 260 km
2	Wednesday	May 21, 2025	Sun City	Marathon Camp	626 km / 357 km
3	Thursday	May 22, 2025	Marathon Camp	Sun City	518 km / 246 km
4	Friday	May 23, 2025	Sun City	Sun City	694 km / 224 km
5	Saturday	May 24, 2025	Sun City	Sun City	155 km / 111 km

== Stage winners ==
Stage	Bikes	Cars	Challenger (T3)	SSV (T4)	Quad
Prologue	(Australia) Daniel Sanders	(South Africa) Gareth Woolridge	(Spain) Pau Navarro	(Portugal) Alexandre Pinto	(France) Gaëtan Martinez
Stage 1	(Botswana) Ross Branch	(South Africa) Henk Lategan	(Argentina) David Zille	(United Kingdom) Richard Aczel	(France) Gaëtan Martinez
Stage 2	(Australia) Daniel Sanders	(South Africa) Guy Botterill	(Argentina) Nicolás Cavigliasso	(Portugal) Alexandre Pinto	(Lithuania) Antanas Kanopkinas
Stage 3	(Australia) Daniel Sanders	(Qatar) Nasser Al-Attiyah	(Argentina) David Zille	(Portugal) Mário Franco	(France) Gaëtan Martinez
Stage 4	(Australia) Daniel Sanders	(South Africa) Saood Variawa	(Argentina) David Zille	(Portugal) Alexandre Pinto	(Lithuania) Antanas Kanopkinas
Stage 5	(United States) Ricky Brabec	(Qatar) Nasser Al-Attiyah	(Argentina) Nicolás Cavigliasso	(Italy) Enrico Gaspari	(France) Gaëtan Martinez
Rally Winners	(Australia) Daniel Sanders	(South Africa) Henk Lategan	(Argentina) David Zille	(Portugal) Mário Franco	(France) Gaëtan Martinez

== Stage results ==
=== Bikes ===
	Stage result					General classification				
Stage	Pos	Competitor	Make	Time	Gap	Pos	Competitor	Make	Time	Gap
Prologue	1	(Australia) Daniel Sanders	KTM	00:07:08.1		1	(Australia) Daniel Sanders	KTM	00:07:08.1	
Prologue	2	(Spain) Tosha Schareina	Honda	00:07:12.4	00:00:04	2	(Spain) Tosha Schareina	Honda	00:07:12.4	00:00:04
Prologue	3	(South Africa) Michael Docherty	KTM	00:07:16.7	00:00:08	3	(South Africa) Michael Docherty	KTM	00:07:16.7	00:00:08
Stage 1	1	(Botswana) Ross Branch	Hero	02:44:04		1	(Botswana) Ross Branch	Hero	02:51:32	
Stage 1	2	(France) Adrien Van Beveren	Honda	02:44:59	00:00:55	2	(France) Adrien Van Beveren	Honda	02:52:22	00:00:50
Stage 1	3	(United States) Ricky Brabec	Honda	02:45:13	00:01:09	3	(United States) Ricky Brabec	Honda	02:52:35	00:01:03
Stage 2	1	(Australia) Daniel Sanders	KTM	03:40:30		1	(Australia) Daniel Sanders	KTM	06:34:46	
Stage 2	2	(Argentina) Luciano Benavides	KTM	03:41:02	00:00:32	2	(Argentina) Luciano Benavides	KTM	06:35:57	00:01:11
Stage 2	3	(United States) Ricky Brabec	Honda	03:45:16	00:04:46	3	(France) Adrien Van Beveren	Honda	06:37:44	00:02:58
Stage 3	1	(Australia) Daniel Sanders	KTM	03:06:46		1	(Australia) Daniel Sanders	KTM	09:41:32	
Stage 3	2	(Argentina) Luciano Benavides	KTM	03:08:23	00:01:37	2	(Argentina) Luciano Benavides	KTM	09:44:20	00:02:48
Stage 3	3	(Botswana) Ross Branch	Hero	03:09:25	00:02:39	3	(United States) Ricky Brabec	Honda	09:49:51	00:08:19
Stage 4	1	(Australia) Daniel Sanders	KTM	02:22:13		1	(Australia) Daniel Sanders	KTM	12:03:45	
Stage 4	2	(France) Adrien Van Beveren	Honda	02:23:06	00:00:53	2	(Argentina) Luciano Benavides	KTM	12:10:46	00:07:01
Stage 4	3	(United States) Skyler Howes	Honda	02:24:02	00:01:49	3	(France) Adrien Van Beveren	Honda	12:14:02	00:10:17
Stage 5	1	(United States) Ricky Brabec	Honda	01:23:17		1	(Australia) Daniel Sanders	KTM	13:27:44	
Stage 5	2	(Australia) Daniel Sanders	KTM	01:23:59	00:00:42	2	(Argentina) Luciano Benavides	KTM	13:36:39	00:08:55
Stage 5	3	(Botswana) Ross Branch	Hero	01:25:23	00:02:06	3	(United States) Ricky Brabec	Honda	13:37:44	00:10:00

=== Cars ===
	Stage result					General classification				
Stage	Pos	Competitor	Make	Time	Gap	Pos	Competitor	Make	Time	Gap
Prologue	1	(South Africa) Gareth Woolridge	Ford	00:06:48.1		results of Prologue aren't accountable towards GC, only for starting position on Stage 1				
Prologue	2	(South Africa) Guy Botterill	Toyota	00:06:49.0	00:00:01	results of Prologue aren't accountable towards GC, only for starting position on Stage 1				
Prologue	3	(South Africa) Henk Lategan	Toyota	00:06:52.4	00:00:04	results of Prologue aren't accountable towards GC, only for starting position on Stage 1				
Stage 1	1	(South Africa) Henk Lategan	Toyota	02:26:08		1	(South Africa) Henk Lategan	Toyota	02:26:08	
Stage 1	2	(Spain) Carlos Sainz Sr.	Ford	02:28:46	00:02:38	2	(Spain) Carlos Sainz Sr.	Ford	02:28:46	00:02:38
Stage 1	3	(France) Sébastien Loeb	Dacia	02:29:42	00:03:34	3	(France) Sébastien Loeb	Dacia	02:29:42	00:03:34
Stage 2	1	(South Africa) Guy Botterill	Toyota	03:12:36		1	(United States) Seth Quintero	Toyota	05:49:23	
Stage 2	2	(South Africa) Saood Variawa	Toyota	03:13:31	00:00:55	2	(South Africa) Brian Baragwanath	Century	05:49:36	00:00:13
Stage 2	3	(Belgium) Guillaume De Mévius	Mini	03:14:24	00:01:48	3	(Brazil) Lucas Moraes	Toyota	05:50:54	00:01:31
Stage 3	1	(Qatar) Nasser Al-Attiyah	Dacia	02:51:29		1	(France) Sébastien Loeb	Dacia	08:47:05	
Stage 3	2	(Spain) Carlos Sainz Sr.	Ford	02:53:34	00:02:05	2	(Spain) Carlos Sainz Sr.	Ford	08:47:28	00:00:23
Stage 3	3	(France) Mathieu Serradori	Century	02:53:58	00:02:29	3	(South Africa) Henk Lategan	Toyota	08:47:35	00:00:30
Stage 4	1	(South Africa) Saood Variawa	Toyota	02:09:05		1	(South Africa) Henk Lategan	Toyota	10:59:53	
Stage 4	2	(South Africa) Guy Botterill	Toyota	02:10:24	00:01:19	2	(France) Sébastien Loeb	Dacia	11:00:32	00:00:39
Stage 4	3	(Germany) Daniel Schröder	VW	02:11:18	00:02:13	3	(United States) Seth Quintero	Toyota	11:02:41	00:02:48
Stage 5	1	(Qatar) Nasser Al-Attiyah	Dacia	01:08:49		1	(South Africa) Henk Lategan	Toyota	12:10:42	
Stage 5	2	(Brazil) Lucas Moraes	Toyota	01:10:45	00:01:56	2	(France) Sébastien Loeb	Dacia	12:12:21	00:01:39
Stage 5	3	(South Africa) Henk Lategan	Toyota	01:10:49	00:02:00	3	(Brazil) Lucas Moraes	Toyota	12:13:37	00:02:55

=== Challenger (T3) ===
	Stage result					General classification				
Stage	Pos	Competitor	Make	Time	Gap	Pos	Competitor	Make	Time	Gap
Prologue	1	(Spain) Pau Navarro	Taurus	00:07:06.0		results of Prologue aren't accountable towards GC, only for starting position on Stage 1				
Prologue	2	(Poland) Adam Kuś	Taurus	00:07:09.2	00:00:03	results of Prologue aren't accountable towards GC, only for starting position on Stage 1				
Prologue	3	(Argentina) David Zille	Taurus	00:07:10.3	00:00:04	results of Prologue aren't accountable towards GC, only for starting position on Stage 1				
Stage 1	1	(Argentina) David Zille	Taurus	02:40:29		1	(Argentina) David Zille	Taurus	02:40:29	
Stage 1	2	(Spain) Pau Navarro	Taurus	02:42:20	00:01:51	2	(Spain) Pau Navarro	Taurus	02:42:20	00:01:51
Stage 1	3	(Poland) Adam Kuś	Taurus	02:42:56	00:02:27	3	(Poland) Adam Kuś	Taurus	02:42:56	00:02:27
Stage 2	1	(Argentina) Nicolás Cavigliasso	Taurus	03:32:39		1	(Argentina) David Zille	Taurus	06:16:55	
Stage 2	2	(Saudi Arabia) Dania Akeel	Taurus	03:34:28	00:01:49	2	(Argentina) Nicolás Cavigliasso	Taurus	06:17:00	00:00:05
Stage 2	3	(Qatar) Khalifa Al-Attiyah	Taurus	03:36:04	00:03:25	3	(Spain) Pau Navarro	Taurus	06:18:27	00:01:32
Stage 3	1	(Argentina) David Zille	Taurus	03:02:37		1	(Argentina) David Zille	Taurus	09:19:32	
Stage 3	2	(Argentina) Nicolás Cavigliasso	Taurus	03:05:28	00:02:51	2	(Argentina) Nicolás Cavigliasso	Taurus	09:22:28	00:02:56
Stage 3	3	(Poland) Adam Kuś	Taurus	03:11:13	00:08:36	3	(Poland) Adam Kuś	Taurus	09:31:44	00:12:12
Stage 4	1	(Argentina) David Zille	Taurus	02:17:29		1	(Argentina) David Zille	Taurus	11:37:01	
Stage 4	2	(Spain) Pau Navarro	Taurus	02:19:07	00:01:38	2	(Argentina) Nicolás Cavigliasso	Taurus	11:42:37	00:05:36
Stage 4	3	(Saudi Arabia) Dania Akeel	Taurus	02:19:39	00:02:10	3	(Poland) Adam Kuś	Taurus	11:53:40	00:16:39
Stage 5	1	(Argentina) Nicolás Cavigliasso	Taurus	01:15:41		1	(Argentina) David Zille	Taurus	12:54:39	
Stage 5	2	(Qatar) Khalifa Al-Attiyah	Taurus	01:16:08	00:00:27	2	(Argentina) Nicolás Cavigliasso	Taurus	12:58:18	00:03:39
Stage 5	3	(Argentina) David Zille	Taurus	01:17:38	00:01:57	3	(Poland) Adam Kuś	Taurus	13:13:01	00:18:22

=== SSV (T4) ===
	Stage result					General classification				
Stage	Pos	Competitor	Make	Time	Gap	Pos	Competitor	Make	Time	Gap
Prologue	1	(Portugal) Alexandre Pinto	Can-Am	00:07:20.6		results of Prologue aren't accountable towards GC, only for starting position on Stage 1				
Prologue	2	(Portugal) José Nogueira	Can-Am	00:07:35.4	00:00:15	results of Prologue aren't accountable towards GC, only for starting position on Stage 1				
Prologue	3	(Portugal) Mário Franco	Can-Am	00:07:38:9	00:00:18	results of Prologue aren't accountable towards GC, only for starting position on Stage 1				
Stage 1	1	(United Kingdom) Richard Aczel	Can-Am	03:01:28		1	(United Kingdom) Richard Aczel	Can-Am	03:01:28	
Stage 1	2	(United Kingdom) George Halles	Polaris	03:03:32	00:02:04	2	(United Kingdom) George Halles	Polaris	03:03:32	00:02:04
Stage 1	3	(Portugal) José Nogueira	Can-Am	03:05:50	00:04:22	3	(Portugal) José Nogueira	Can-Am	03:05:50	00:04:22
Stage 2	1	(Portugal) Alexandre Pinto	Can-Am	03:46:55		1	(Portugal) Mário Franco	Can-Am	06:59:15	
Stage 2	2	(Portugal) Mário Franco	Can-Am	03:48:08	00:01:13	2	(United Kingdom) Richard Aczel	Can-Am	07:01:44	00:02:29
Stage 2	3	(Italy) Enrico Gaspari	Can-Am	03:55:29	00:08:34	3	(Italy) Michele Cinotto	Polaris	07:20:53	00:21:38
Stage 3	1	(Portugal) Mário Franco	Can-Am	03:18:28		1	(Portugal) Mário Franco	Can-Am	10:17:43	
Stage 3	2	(Portugal) José Nogueira	Can-Am	03:25:44	00:07:16	2	(United Kingdom) Richard Aczel	Can-Am	10:28:16	00:10:33
Stage 3	3	(United Kingdom) Richard Aczel	Can-Am	03:26:32	00:08:04	3	(Italy) Michele Cinotto	Polaris	10:49:24	00:31:41
Stage 4	1	(Portugal) Alexandre Pinto	Can-Am	02:26:26		1	(Portugal) Mário Franco	Can-Am	12:50:00	
Stage 4	2	(Italy) Enrico Gaspari	Can-Am	02:29:09	00:02:43	2	(United Kingdom) Richard Aczel	Can-Am	13:01:54	00:11:54
Stage 4	3	(Portugal) José Nogueira	Can-Am	02:31:40	00:05:14	3	(Italy) Michele Cinotto	Polaris	13:35:31	00:45:31
Stage 5	1	(Italy) Enrico Gaspari	Can-Am	01:19:48		1	(Portugal) Mário Franco	Can-Am	14:13:56	
Stage 5	2	(Portugal) Alexandre Pinto	Can-Am	01:20:49	00:01:01	2	(United Kingdom) Richard Aczel	Can-Am	14:25:52	00:11:56
Stage 5	3	(United Kingdom) George Halles	Polaris	01:21:38	00:01:50	3	(Italy) Michele Cinotto	Polaris	15:05:12	00:51:16

=== Quads ===
	Stage result					General classification				
Stage	Pos	Competitor	Make	Time	Gap	Pos	Competitor	Make	Time	Gap
Prologue	1	(France) Gaëtan Martinez	CFMoto	00:08:33.6		1	(France) Gaëtan Martinez	CFMoto	00:08:33.6	
Prologue	2	(Poland) Marek Loj	Yamaha	00:08:34.3	00:00:01	2	(Poland) Marek Loj	Yamaha	00:08:34.3	00:00:01
Prologue	3	(Lithuania) Antanas Kanopkinas	CFMoto	00:08:36.1	00:00:03	3	(Lithuania) Antanas Kanopkinas	CFMoto	00:08:36.1	00:00:03
Stage 1	1	(France) Gaëtan Martinez	CFMoto	03:25:42		1	(France) Gaëtan Martinez	CFMoto	03:34:15	
Stage 1	2	(Lithuania) Antanas Kanopkinas	CFMoto	03:52:29	00:26:47	2	(Lithuania) Antanas Kanopkinas	CFMoto	04:01:05	00:26:50
Stage 1	3	(Poland) Marek Loj	Yamaha	21:42:00	18:16:18	3	(Poland) Marek Loj	Yamaha	21:50:34	18:16:19
Stage 2	1	(Lithuania) Antanas Kanopkinas	CFMoto	04:43:47		1	(France) Gaëtan Martinez	CFMoto	08:22:50	
Stage 2	2	(France) Gaëtan Martinez	CFMoto	04:48:35	00:04:48	2	(Lithuania) Antanas Kanopkinas	CFMoto	08:44:52	00:22:02
Stage 2	3	(South Africa) Carien Teessen	Yamaha	07:09:58	02:26:11	3	(South Africa) Carien Teessen	Yamaha	41:23:25	33:00:35
Stage 3	1	(France) Gaëtan Martinez	CFMoto	03:55:01		1	(France) Gaëtan Martinez	CFMoto	12:17:51	
Stage 3	2	(Lithuania) Antanas Kanopkinas	CFMoto	03:57:10	00:02:09	2	(Lithuania) Antanas Kanopkinas	CFMoto	12:42:02	00:24:11
Stage 3	3	(South Africa) Carien Teessen	Yamaha	36:52:00	32:56:59	3	(South Africa) Carien Teessen	Yamaha	78:15:25	65:57:34
Stage 4	1	(Lithuania) Antanas Kanopkinas	CFMoto	02:55:38		1	(France) Gaëtan Martinez	CFMoto	15:18:17	
Stage 4	2	(France) Gaëtan Martinez	CFMoto	03:00:26	00:04:48	2	(Lithuania) Antanas Kanopkinas	CFMoto	15:37:40	00:19:23
Stage 4	3	(South Africa) Carien Teessen	Yamaha	04:15:07	01:19:29	3	(South Africa) Carien Teessen	Yamaha	82:30:32	67:12:15
Stage 5	1	(France) Gaëtan Martinez	CFMoto	01:45:37		1	(France) Gaëtan Martinez	CFMoto	17:03:54	
Stage 5	2	(Lithuania) Antanas Kanopkinas	CFMoto	01:48:39	00:03:02	2	(Lithuania) Antanas Kanopkinas	CFMoto	17:26:19	00:22:25
Stage 5	3	(South Africa) Carien Teessen	Yamaha	02:40:26	00:54:49	3	(South Africa) Carien Teessen	Yamaha	85:10:58	68:07:04

== Final standings ==
=== Bikes ===
Final standings (positions 1–10)
Rank	Rider	Bike	Time	Difference
1	(Australia) Daniel Sanders	KTM 450 Rally Factory	13:27:44	
2	(Argentina) Luciano Benavides	KTM 450 Rally Factory	13:36:39	+0:08:55
3	(United States) Ricky Brabec	Honda CRF450 Rally	13:37:44	+0:10:00
4	(France) Adrien Van Beveren	Honda CRF450 Rally	13:43:31	+0:15:47
5	(United States) Skyler Howes	Honda CRF450 Rally	14:03:32	+0:35:48
6	(Chile) José Ignacio Cornejo	Hero 450 Rally	14:13:46	+0:46:02
7	(Spain) Edgar Canet	KTM 450 Rally Factory	14:17:00	+0:49:16
8	(South Africa) Bradley Cox	Sherco SHR 450	14:27:46	+01:00:02
9	(Austria) Tobias Ebster	KTM 450 Rally Replica	14:32:24	+01:04:40
10	(South Africa) Michael Docherty	Husqvarna FR 450 Rally	14:40:35	+01:12:51

=== Cars ===
Final standings (positions 1–10)
Rank	Driver	Co-Driver	Car	Time	Difference
1	(South Africa) Henk Lategan	(South Africa) Brett Cummings	Toyota GR DKR Hilux	12:10:42	
2	(France) Sébastien Loeb	(Belgium) Fabian Lurquin	Dacia Sandrider	12:12:21	+0:01:39
3	(Brazil) Lucas Moraes	(Spain) Armand Monleón	Toyota GR DKR Hilux	12:13:37	+0:02:55
4	(South Africa) Gareth Woolridge	(South Africa) Boyd Dreyer	Ford Raptor DKR	12:15:30	+0:04:48
5	(Spain) Carlos Sainz Sr.	(Spain) Lucas Cruz	Ford Raptor DKR	12:15:57	+0:05:15
6	(United States) Seth Quintero	(Germany) Dennis Zenz	Toyota GR DKR Hilux	12:17:01	+0:06:19
7	(Spain) Nani Roma	(Spain) Álex Haro	Ford Raptor DKR	12:17:27	+0:06:45
8	(Germany) Daniel Schröder	(South Africa) Henry Carl Köhne	Volkswagen Wct Amarok	12:19:46	+0:09:04
9	(Belgium) Guillaume De Mévius	(France) Xavier Panseri	Mini JCW Rally 3.0d	12:22:26	+0:11:44
10	(Qatar) Nasser Al-Attiyah	(France) Édouard Boulanger	Dacia Sandrider	12:22:30	+0:11:48

=== Challenger (T3) ===
Final standings (positions 1–10)
Rank	Driver	Co-Driver	Car	Time	Difference
1	(Argentina) David Zille	(Argentina) Sebastian Cesana	Taurus T3 Max	12:54:39	
2	(Argentina) Nicolás Cavigliasso	(Argentina) Valentina Pertegarini	Taurus T3 Max	12:58:18	+0:03:39
3	(Poland) Adam Kuś	(Ukraine) Dmytro Tsyro	Taurus T3 Max	13:13:01	+0:18:22
4	(Qatar) Khalifa Al-Attiyah	(Argentina) Bruno Jacomy	Taurus T3 Max	13:14:05	+0:19:26
5	(Saudi Arabia) Dania Akeel	(France) Stéphane Duplé	Taurus T3 Max	13:18:12	+0:23:33
6	(Spain) Pau Navarro	(Spain) Jan Rosa i Vinas	Taurus T3 Max	13:33:28	+0:38:49
7	(Netherlands) Puck Klaassen	(South Africa) Charan Moore	GRallyTeam OT3	13:46:06	+0:51:27

=== SSV (T4) ===
Final standings (positions 1–10)
Rank	Driver	Co-Driver	Car	Time	Difference
1	(Portugal) Mário Franco	(Portugal) João Miranda	BRP Can-Am Maverick R	14:13:56	
2	(United Kingdom) Richard Aczel	(Netherlands) Wouter Rosegaar	BRP Can-Am Maverick R	14:25:52	+0:11:56
3	(Italy) Michele Cinotto	(Italy) Maurizio Dominella	BRP Can-Am Maverick XRS Turbo RR	15:05:12	+0:51:16
4	(United Kingdom) George Halles	(France) Max Delfino	Polaris RZR Pro R Sport	15:15:56	+1:02:00
5	(Portugal) José Nogueira	(Portugal) Arcelio Couto	BRP Can-Am Maverick XRS Turbo RR	16:14:00	+2:00:04
6	(Portugal) Alexandre Pinto	(Portugal) Bernardo Oliveira	BRP Can-Am Maverick XRS Turbo RR	16:20:11	+2:06:15
7	(Spain) Domingo Román	(Spain) Gustavo Ibeas	Polaris RZR Pro R Sport	16:38:22	+2:24:26
8	(France) Claude Fournier	(France) Patrick Jimbert	BRP Can-Am Maverick XRS Turbo RR	16:48:00	+2:34:04
9	(United Kingdom) Graham Knight	(United Kingdom) David Watson	Polaris RZR Pro R Sport	29:02:09	+14:48:13
10	(Italy) Enrico Gaspari	(Portugal) Fausto Mota	BRP Can-Am Maverick XRS Turbo RR	31:26:55	+17:12:59

=== Quads ===
Final standings (positions 1–3)
Rank	Rider	Quad	Time	Difference
1	(France) Gaëtan Martinez	CFMoto CForce 1000	17:03:54	
2	(Lithuania) Antanas Kanopkinas	CFMoto CForce 1000	17:26:19	+0:22:25
3	(South Africa) Carien Teessen	Yamaha 700 Raptor	85:10:58	+68:07:04
