= South Africa Safari Rally =

Off-road motorsport event

South Africa Safari Rally is an international rally-raid competition held in the North West and Limpopo provinces of South Africa. The headquarters of the race is at the Sun City complex, near the Pilanesberg National Park. It is the third leg of the FIA FIM World Rally-Raid Championship 2025 (W2RC) and is a points scoring event. It is organised by South Africa Rally Raid Championship, an off-road racing series in South Africa, in collaboration with Motorsport South Africa, under the aegis of the sports global governing bodies for four wheelers and two wheelers, Federation Internationale de l’Automobile (FIA) and Fédération Internationale de Motocyclisme (FIM) respectively, and the promoter Amaury Sport Organisation.

The World Rally-Raid Championship calendar for the 2025 season features five rally-raid events and the South Africa Safari Rally, added to the calendar in 2025, makes its debut in the World Championship calendar replacing Desafío Ruta 40 rally. It is the third round of the W2RC after the first round, the Dakar Rally held in January, and the second round, the Abu Dhabi Desert Challenge held in February. The event is from 18 to 24 May, 2025. After the South Africa Safari, the five round world championship, runs two more rounds, the BP Ultimate Rally-Raid Portugal and the Rallye du Maroc.

== Rally route ==
The route includes a prologue and five stages, known as SS or Selective Sections, covering a distance of 2,647 km. The competitive stage distance is 1,218 km of dry and dusty central Africa to the more fertile mountain regions. The raid will start from Sun City, about 140 km from Johannesburg, and with minimal liaison sections surrounded by bushveld, in and around the Pilanesberg National Park. The marathon stage will be in the central region of South Africa, deep in the savannah. The second and third selective sections are combined to make it the marathon stage. The route is designed by Evan Hutchison, a seven-time South African cross country champion.

== List of winners ==
=== FIA ===
Year	Route	Ultimate		Challenger		SSVs	
Year	Route	Driver Co-driver	Make & model	Driver Co-driver	Make & model	Driver Co-driver	Make & model
2025	Sun City - Sun City	(South Africa) Henk Lategan (South Africa) Brett Cummings	Toyota Gazoo Racing	(Argentina) David Zille (Argentina) Sebastian Cesana	Taurus T3 Max	(Portugal) Mário Franco (Portugal) João Miranda	BRP Can-Am Maverick X3

=== FIM ===
Year	Route	RallyGP		Rally2		Quads	
Year	Route	Driver	Make & model	Driver	Make & model	Driver	Make & model
2025	Sun City - Sun City	(Australia) Daniel Sanders	KTM 450 Rally Factory	(Spain) Edgar Canet	KTM 450 Rally Replica	(France) Gaetan Martinez	CFMoto CForce 1000 R
