= Guillaume De Mévius =

Belgian rally driver (born 1994)

Guillaume de Mévius
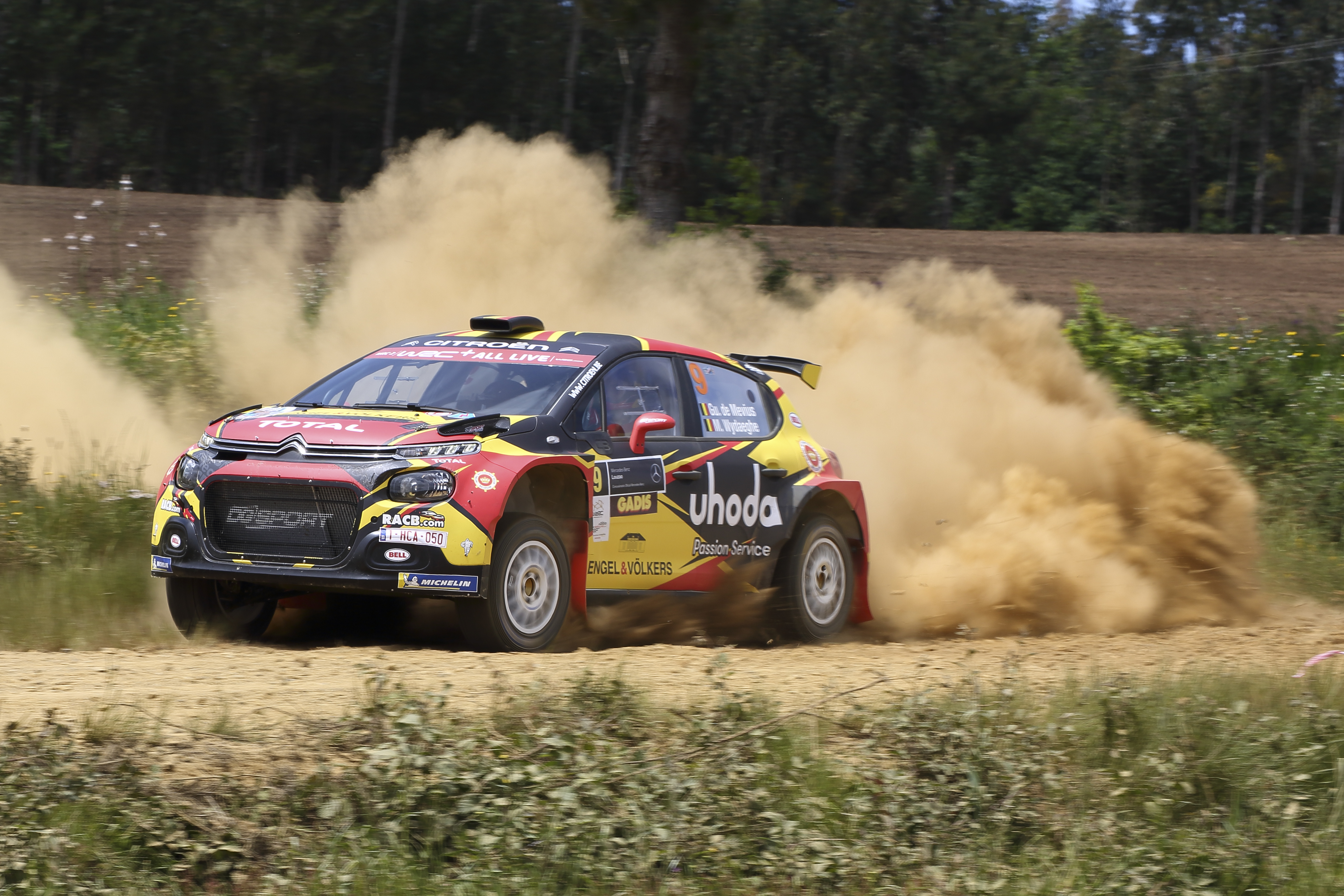
- de Mévius competing at the Rally Terra da Auga in 2019.
- Nationality: (Belgium) Belgian
- Born: 4 August 1994 (age 32)
- Relatives: Grégoire De Mévius (father)

Guillaume de Mévius (born 4 August 1994) is a Belgian rally driver. He is currently part of Red Bull's rallying team for rally raid events and was part of the inaugural World Rally-Raid Championship. He has previously driven in the World Rally Championship-2.

De Mévius is the son of former World Rally Championship driver Grégoire De Mévius.

== Career ==
De Mévius began competing in rally in 2013, focusing primarily on the Belgian Rally Championship. In 2017, de Mévius won the Junior class of the Belgian Rally Championship. In 2019, de Mévius was hired by Citroën to compete in World Rally Championship-2, but lasted only one year before returning to national level rally.

In 2021, de Mévius signed to drive for the Red Bull Off-Road Junior team in the T3 Light Prototype class, initially in the FIA World Cup for Cross-Country Rallies and later in the World Rally-Raid Championship after it was rebranded, and in individual events such as the Dakar Rally. de Mévius took his first win in this championship in the 2022 Andalucía Rally. In 2023, de Mévius remained a Red Bull driver, but instead moved to GRally Team, formed by himself and his brother Ghislain. The team did not register for the World Rally-Raid Championship, instead electing to participate in individual events.

== Rally results ==
=== WRC results ===
Year	Entrant	Car	1	2	3	4	5	6	7	8	9	10	11	12	13	14	WDC	Points
2018	Peugeot Belgium Luxembourg	Peugeot 208 T16 R5	MON; 19	SWE	MEX	FRA	ARG	POR	ITA	FIN	GER	TUR	GBR	ESP	AUS		NC	0
2019	Citroën Total	Citroën C3 R5	MON; Ret	SWE	MEX	FRA; 19	ARG	CHI	POR; 17	ITA; 34	FIN	GER; 34	TUR	GBR; 24	ESP; 20	AUS	NC	0

=== WRC2 results ===
Year	Entrant	Car	1	2	3	4	5	6	7	8	9	10	11	12	13	14	WDC	Points
2018	Peugeot Belgium Luxembourg	Peugeot 208 T16 R5	MON; 4	SWE	MEX	FRA	ARG	POR	ITA	FIN	GER	TUR	GBR	ESP	AUS		28th	12
2019	Citroën Total	Citroën C3 R5	MON; Ret	SWE	MEX	FRA; 7	ARG	CHI	POR; 9	ITA; 6	FIN	GER; 10	TUR	GBR; 9	ESP; 8	AUS	23rd	23

=== Dakar Rally results ===
Year	Class	Vehicle	Position	Stages won
2022	Light Prototype	(Belgium) OT3	DNF	1
2023	Light Prototype	(Belgium) OT3	3rd	1
2024	Car	(Japan) Toyota	2nd	1
2025	Car	(United Kingdom) Mini	22nd	1

=== Complete World Rally-Raid Championship results ===
(key)

Year	Team	Car	Class	1	2	3	4	5	Pos.	Points
2022	Red Bull Off-Road Team USA	OT3	T3	DAK; Ret	ABU; Ret	MOR; 5^{29}	AND; 1^{30}		4th	59
2024	Overdrive Racing	Hilux Overdrive	Ultimate	DAK; 2^{58}	ABU; Ret^{4}	PRT; 22^{3}	DES	MOR; 3^{35}	4th	100
2025	X-raid Mini JCW Team	JCW Rally 3.0d	Ultimate	DAK; 23^{16}	ABU; 29^{2}	ZAF; 9^{13}	PRT	MOR	15th	31
2026	X-raid Mini JCW Team	JCW Rally 3.0i	Ultimate	DAK; 42^{11}	PRT	DES	MOR	ABU	18th*	11*
