= 2025 Abu Dhabi Desert Challenge =

Off-road motorsport event in United Arab Emirates

Part of the 2025 World Rally-Raid Championship
← Previous event	Next event →
- Host country: United Arab Emirates
- Dates run: 22–27 February 2025
- Start: Al Ain
- Finish: Abu Dhabi
- Stages: 5
- Stage surface: Sand, rocks, gravel, tarmac

Results
- Cars winner: (Qatar) Nasser Al-Attiyah (France) Édouard Boulanger; The Dacia Sandriders
- Bikes winner: (Australia) Daniel Sanders; Red Bull KTM Factory Racing
- Challenger winner: (Saudi Arabia) Dania Akeel (France) Stéphane Duple; BBR Motorsport
- SSVs winner: (Argentina) Jeremías González (Argentina) José Sebastian Cesana; Can-Am Factory Team
- Quads winner: (Lithuania) Antanas Kanopkinas; CFMoto Thunder Racing

The 2025 Abu Dhabi Desert Challenge was a rally raid event based in United Arab Emirates. It was the 33rd edition of the Abu Dhabi Desert Challenge, organized by Emirates Motorsports Organisation (EMSO).

The event took place from 22 to 27 February 2025 and also counted as the second round of the 2025 World Rally-Raid Championship.

== Background ==
The route started at Al Ain, crossing desert to Mezaira’a, before taking on two marathon stages from Alqua'a. Cars participated in marathon stages for the first time at the event, before the finish in Abu Dhabi. The race format consisted of 6 days of racing, divided into 5 stages and a prologue.

=== Competitor list ===
Entry list – Bikes

No.	Driver	Bike	Team	Class
1	(Botswana) Ross Branch	Hero 450 Rally	Hero MotoSports Team Rally	RallyGP
4	(Australia) Daniel Sanders	KTM 450 Rally Factory	Red Bull KTM Factory Racing	RallyGP
9	(United States) Ricky Brabec	Honda CRF 450 Rally	Monster Energy Honda HRC	RallyGP
10	(United States) Skyler Howes	Honda CRF 450 Rally	Monster Energy Honda HRC	RallyGP
11	(Chile) José Ignacio Cornejo	Hero 450 Rally	Hero MotoSports Team Rally	RallyGP
17	(United Arab Emirates) Mohammed Al-Balooshi	KTM 450 Rally	MX Ride Dubai	RallyGP
42	(France) Adrien Van Beveren	Honda CRF 450 Rally	Monster Energy Honda HRC	RallyGP
68	(Spain) Tosha Schareina	Honda CRF 450 Rally	Monster Energy Honda HRC	RallyGP
77	(Argentina) Luciano Benavides	KTM 450 Rally Factory	Red Bull KTM Factory Racing	RallyGP
21	(United Kingdom) Alex McInnes	Husqvarna FR 450 Rally	Motozone Racing	Rally2^{J}
22	(South Africa) Michael Docherty	Husqvarna FR 450 Rally	SRG Motorsports	Rally2
26	(Poland) Konrad Dabrowski	KTM 450 Rally Replica	Duust Rally Team	Rally2^{J}
27	(United Arab Emirates) Sultan Al-Balooshi		MX Ride Dubai	Rally2
28	(United Arab Emirates) Marwan Al-Rahmani		MX Ride Dubai	Rally2
29	(France) Ludvig Messager	Husqvarna FR 450 Rally		Rally2
30	(Australia) David Brock	KTM 450 Rally Replica	Nomadas Adventure	Rally2^{V}
31	(Mexico) Fernando Pasquel	KTM 450 Rally Replica	Nomadas Adventure	Rally2
32	(India) Rajendra Revallar	Kove XE 450 Rally	SRG Motorsports	Rally2
33	(United Kingdom) Brett Hunt	Husqvarna FE 450		Rally2
34	(Portugal) Martim Ventura	Husqvarna FR 450 Rally	Old Friends Rally Team	Rally2^{J}
35	(Portugal) Pedro Pinheiro	Husqvarna FR 450 Rally	Old Friends Rally Team	Rally2
36	(Spain) Ricardo Lastra	Husqvarna FR 450 Rally	Old Friends Rally Team	Rally2^{V}
37	(Italy) Mattia Riva	KTM 450 Rally	SRG Motorsports	Rally2
38	(Italy) Massimiliano Guerrini	Husqvarna FR 450 Rally	SRG Motorsports	Rally2^{V}
39	(Chile) Andro Korlaet	KTM 450 Rally	XRaids Experience	Rally3
40	(Argentina) Eduardo Alan	KTM 450 Rally	XRaids Experience	Rally2^{V}
41	(Chile) Ruy Barbosa	KTM 450 Rally	XRaids Experience	Rally2
43	(Argentina) Sebastian Urquia	KTM 450 Rally	XRaids Experience	Rally2^{V}
44	(India) Abdul Wahid	KTM 450 Rally Replica	XRaids Experience	Rally2
45	(India) Jatin Jain	Kove XE 450 Rally		Rally2^{V}
46	(Spain) Joan Vinals	KTM 450 Rally Replica	Joyride Race Service	Rally2
47	(Spain) Iñigo Zardoya	KTM 450 Rally Replica	Joyride Race Service	Rally2
48	(Argentina) Leonardo Cola	KTM 450 Rally Replica	Joyride Race Service	Rally2
49	(Paraguay) Blas Zapag	Husqvarna FR 450 Rally	HT Rally Raid	Rally2
50	(Netherlands) Kees Koolen	Husqvarna FR 450 Rally	HT Rally Raid	Rally2^{V}
51	(Germany) Markus Hertlein	Husqvarna FR 450 Rally	HT Rally Raid	Rally2
52	(Mongolia) Khaliunbold Erdenebileg	Husqvarna FR 450 Rally	HT Rally Raid	Rally2
53	(Lithuania) Edvard Sokolovskij	KTM 450 Rally	AG Dakar School	Rally2
55	(Lebanon) Ehab Alhakeem	Fantic 450 Rally Replica		Rally2
56	(United Kingdom) Jason Joslin	Gas Gas RX 450F		Rally2
57	(United Arab Emirates) Hamdan Al-Ali	KTM 450 Rally Replica		Rally2
58	(Germany) Philip Horlemann	KTM 450 Rally Replica		Rally2
59	(Germany) Tony Schattat	KTM 450 Rally Replica		Rally2
60	(Poland) Robert Przybylowski	KTM 450 Rally		Rally2^{V}
61	(Poland) Marcin Talaga	Gas Gas RX 450F		Rally2
73	(Spain) Edgar Canet	KTM 450 Rally Factory	Red Bull KTM Factory Racing	Rally2^{J}
74	(United Kingdom) Leo Conaboy	Husqvarna FR 450 Rally		Rally2
80	(United Kingdom) Carl Searles	Husqvarna FR 450 Rally		Rally2
81	(France) Alessandro Mendoza	Husqvarna FR 450 Rally		Rally2
82	(United Kingdom) Craig Searles	Husqvarna FR 450 Rally		Rally2
83	(Saudi Arabia) Badr Alhamdan	Kove XE 450 Rally		Rally2
86	(Australia) Martin Chalmers	Gas Gas RX 450F		Rally2
88	(United Kingdom) Thomas Childs	KTM 450 Rally		Rally2
94	(United Arab Emirates) Abdulla Lanjawi	Kove XE 450 Rally		Rally2
96	(Austria) Tobias Ebster	Husqvarna FE 450	SRG Motorsports	Rally2
99	(Germany) Justin Gerlach	Husqvarna FE 450		Rally2^{J}

Entry list – Quads

No.	Driver	Bike	Team	Class
103	(Lithuania) Antanas Kanopkinas	CFMoto CForce 1000	CFMoto Thunder Racing	Quad
104	(Saudi Arabia) Hani Al-Noumesi	Yamaha 700 Raptor		Quad
110	(France) Gaëtan Martinez	CFMoto CForce 1000	CFMoto Thunder Racing	Quad
114	(Poland) Marcin Wilkolek	Yamaha 700 Raptor		Quad
115	(Poland) Marek Loj	Yamaha 700 Raptor		Quad
116	(Saudi Arabia) Abdulaziz Alatawi	Yamaha 700 Raptor		Quad
174	(United Arab Emirates) Abdulaziz Ahli	Yamaha 700 Raptor		Quad

Entry list – Cars

No.	Driver	Co-driver	Vehicle	Team	Class
200	(Qatar) Nasser Al-Attiyah	(France) Edouard Boulanger	Dacia Sandrider	The Dacia Sandriders	T1+
201	(Saudi Arabia) Yazeed Al-Rajhi	(Germany) Timo Gottschalk	Toyota Hilux Overdrive	Overdrive Racing	T1+
203	(Brazil) Lucas Moraes	(Spain) Armand Monleon	Toyota GR DKR Hilux	Toyota Gazoo Racing	T1+
204	(United States) Seth Quintero	(Germany) Dennis Zenz	Toyota GR DKR Hilux	Toyota Gazoo Racing	T1.+
205	(Argentina) Juan Cruz Yacopini	(Spain) Daniel Oliveras	Toyota Hilux Overdrive	Overdrive Racing	T1.+
206	(Lithuania) Rokas Baciuška	(Spain) Pablo Moreno	Toyota Hilux Overdrive	Overdrive Racing	T1.+
208	(Czech Republic) Miroslav Zapletal	(Poland) Michal Goleniewski	Ford F150 Evo	Offroadsport	T1.+
209	(Chile) Hernan Garces	(Chile) Juan Pablo Latrach	Toyota Hilux Overdrive	Overdrive Racing	T1.+
210	(Seychelles) Aliyyah Koloc	(France) Sebastien Delaunay	Red-lined Revo T1+ Turbo	Buggyra Zm Racing	T1.+
211	(South Africa) Henk Lategan	(South Africa) Brett Cummings	Toyota Hilux IMT EVO	Toyota Gazoo Racing	T1.+
213	(Poland) Eryk Goczał	(Spain) Oriol Mena	Toyota Hilux Overdrive	Overdrive Racing	T1.+
214	(Poland) Marek Goczał	(Poland) Maciej Marton	Toyota Hilux Overdrive	Overdrive Racing	T1.+
216	(Egypt) Ahmed El Shamy	(United Arab Emirates) Ali Hasan Obaid	Fast&Speed 2WD		T1.2
217	(Kyrgyzstan) Denis Krotov	(Kyrgyzstan) Konstantin Zhiltsov	Toyota Hilux Overdrive	Overdrive Racing	T1.+
218	(South Africa) Saood Variawa	(France) François Cazalet	Toyota Hilux IMT EVO	Toyota Gazoo Racing	T1.+
219	(France) Sébastien Loeb	(Belgium) Fabian Lurquin	Dacia Sandrider	The Dacia Sandriders	T1.+
221	(Czech Republic) Martin Prokop	(Czech Republic) Viktor Chytka	Ford Raptor RS Cross Country	Orlen Jipocar Team	T1.+
222	(Belgium) Guillaume De Mévius	(France) Alexandre Winocq	Mini JCW Rally 3.0i	X-raid Mini JCW Team	T1.+
226	(Sweden) Mattias Ekström	(Sweden) Emil Bergkvist	Ford Raptor DKR	Ford M-Sport	T1.+
228	(United States) Mitch Guthrie	(United States) Kellon Walch	Ford Raptor DKR	Ford M-Sport	T1.+
240	(Portugal) João Ferreira	(Portugal) Filipe Palmeiro	Mini JCW Rally 3.0d	X-raid Mini JCW Team	T1.+
242	(Germany) Daniel Schröder	(South Africa) Henry Carl Köhne	Volkswagen Wct Amarok	Ps Laser Racing	T1.+

Entry list – Challenger (T3)

No.	Driver	Co-driver	Vehicle	Team	Class
301	(Argentina) Nicolás Cavigliasso	(Argentina) Valentina Pertegarini	Taurus T3 Max	BBR Motorsport	T3.1
302	(Netherlands) Puck Klaassen	(South Africa) Charan Moore	GRallyTeam OT3	G Rally Team	T3.1
303	(France) Gregory Lefort	(France) Serge Gounon	Taurus T3 Max	BBR Motorsport	T3.1
304	(Spain) Pau Navarro	(Spain) Jan Rosa i Vinas	Taurus T3 Max	BBR Motorsport	T3.1
305	(Poland) Adam Kus	(Ukraine) Dmytro Tsyro	Taurus T3 Max	Akpol Recykling Team	T3.1
306	(Qatar) Khalifa Al-Attiyah	(Argentina) Bruno Jacomy	Taurus T3 Max	Nasser Racing Team	T3.1
307	(Portugal) Mário Franco	(Portugal) João Miranda	Yamaha YXZ 1000R Turbo Prototype		T3.1
308	(Brazil) Marcos Baumgart	(Brazil) Kleber Cincea	Taurus T3 Max	BBR Motorsport	T3.1
309	(Saudi Arabia) Yasir Seaidan	(France) Michael Metge	Taurus T3 Max	BBR Motorsport	T3.1
310	(Saudi Arabia) Dania Akeel	(France) Stephane Duple	Taurus T3 Max	BBR Motorsport	T3.1
311	(Portugal) Pedro Gonçalves	(Portugal) Hugo Magalhães	X-Raid Yamaha Fenic		T3.1
312	(Spain) Eduard Pons	(Spain) Jaume Betriu	Taurus T3 Max	Nasser Racing Team	T3.1
313	(United Arab Emirates) Khalid Aljafla	Andrei Rudnitski	Taurus T3 Max		T3.1
314	(United Kingdom) Jonathan Hart	(United Arab Emirates) Ali Mirza	Can-Am Maverick X3		T3.1
315	(France) Mathilda Lauwens	(Belgium) Andre Leyh	GRallyTeam OT3	G Rally Team	T3.1

Entry list – SSV (T4)

No.	Driver	Co-driver	Vehicle	Team	Class
401	(Portugal) Alexandre Pinto	(Portugal) Bernardo Oliveira	BRP Can-Am Maverick XRS Turbo RR		T4
402	(Italy) Enrico Gaspari	(Portugal) Fausto Mota	BRP Can-Am Maverick XRS Turbo RR		T4
403	(France) Claude Fournier	(France) Patrick Jimbert	BRP Can-Am Maverick XRS Turbo RR		T4
404	(Italy) Michele Cinotto	(Italy) Alberto Bertoldi	Polaris RZR Pro R Sport		T4
405	(United Arab Emirates) Mansour Al-Helei	(United Arab Emirates) Khalid Alkendi	BRP Can-Am Maverick R	Liwa Team UAE	SSV1
406	(United Arab Emirates) Khalid Al-Qassimi	(Norway) Ola Fløene	BRP Can-Am Maverick R	Liwa Team UAE	SSV1
407	(United Arab Emirates) Yahya Al-Helei	(United Arab Emirates) Mohammed Hamri	BRP Can-Am Maverick XRS Turbo RR	Liwa Team UAE	T4
408	(Poland) Aleksander Szustkowski	(Poland) Jaroslaw Kazberuk	Polaris RZR Pro R Sport		T4
410	(Norway) Hedda Hosås	(Spain) Pol Tibau	BRP Can-Am Maverick XRS Turbo RR	R-X Sport	T4
411	(United Arab Emirates) Atif Alzarouni	(Saudi Arabia) Mohammed Hassan Innab	Yamaha YXZ 1000 R		T4
412	(United Kingdom) David Mabbs	(United Kingdom) David McBride	BRP Can-Am Maverick XRS Turbo RR	Vendetta Racing	T4
413	(Portugal) José Nogueira	(Portugal) Arcelio Couto	BRP Can-Am Maverick XRS Turbo RR		T4
414	(Romania) Marian Andreev	(Romania) Matei Negulescu	Polaris RZR Pro R Sport		T4
415	(Argentina) Jeremias Gonzalez Ferioli	(Argentina) José Sebastian Cesana	BRP Can-Am Maverick R	Can-Am Factory Team	SSV1

== Stages ==
Stage	Date		Start	Finish	Total/Special
Prologue	Saturday	February 22, 2025	Al Ain	Al Ain	72 km / 14 km
1	Sunday	February 23, 2025	Al Ain	Mezaira'a	400 km / 243 km
2	Monday	February 24, 2025	Mezaira'a	Mezaira'a	302 km / 228 km
3	Tuesday	February 25, 2025	Mezaira'a	Mezaira'a	388 km / 237 km
4	Wednesday	February 26, 2025	Mezaira'a	Mezaira'a	394 km / 300 km
5	Thursday	February 27, 2025	Mezaira'a	Abu Dhabi	364 km / 167 km

== Stage winners ==
Stage	Bikes	Cars	Challenger (T3)	SSV (T4)	Quads
Prologue	(Spain) Tosha Schareina	(Qatar) Nasser Al-Attiyah	(Qatar) Khalifa Al-Attiyah	(Argentina) Jeremías González Ferioli	(France) Gaëtan Martinez
Stage 1	(Spain) Tosha Schareina	(Brazil) Lucas Moraes	(Saudi Arabia) Dania Akeel	(Argentina) Jeremías González Ferioli	(United Arab Emirates) Abdulaziz Ahli
Stage 2	(Australia) Daniel Sanders	(France) Sébastien Loeb	(Saudi Arabia) Yasir Seaidan	(Argentina) Jeremías González Ferioli	(Lithuania) Antanas Kanopkinas
Stage 3	(Spain) Tosha Schareina	(Qatar) Nasser Al-Attiyah	(Spain) Pau Navarro	(Argentina) Jeremías González Ferioli	(United Arab Emirates) Abdulaziz Ahli
Stage 4	(Australia) Daniel Sanders	(Poland) Eryk Goczał	(Saudi Arabia) Yasir Seaidan	(Argentina) Jeremías González Ferioli	(Lithuania) Antanas Kanopkinas
Stage 5	(Spain) Tosha Schareina	(Qatar) Nasser Al-Attiyah	(Saudi Arabia) Yasir Seaidan	(Argentina) Jeremías González Ferioli	(Poland) Marek Loj
Rally Winners	(Australia) Daniel Sanders	(Qatar) Nasser Al-Attiyah	(Saudi Arabia) Yasir Seaidan	(Argentina) Jeremías González Ferioli	(Lithuania) Antanas Kanopkinas

== Stage results ==
=== Bikes ===
	Stage result					General classification				
Stage	Pos	Competitor	Make	Time	Gap	Pos	Competitor	Make	Time	Gap
Prologue	1	(Spain) Tosha Schareina	Honda	00:06:53.4		1	(Spain) Tosha Schareina	Honda	00:06:53.4	
Prologue	2	(Argentina) Luciano Benavides	KTM	00:06:57.4	00:00:04	2	(Argentina) Luciano Benavides	KTM	00:06:57.4	00:00:04
Prologue	3	(United States) Ricky Brabec	Honda	00:07:06.4	00:00:13	3	(United States) Ricky Brabec	Honda	00:07:06.4	00:00:13
Stage 1	1	(Spain) Tosha Schareina	Honda	02:54:00		1	(Spain) Tosha Schareina	Honda	03:00:53	
Stage 1	2	(United States) Ricky Brabec	Honda	02:55:54	00:01:54	2	(United States) Ricky Brabec	Honda	03:03:00	00:02:07
Stage 1	3	(Argentina) Luciano Benavides	KTM	02:57:18	00:03:18	3	(Argentina) Luciano Benavides	KTM	03:04:15	00:03:22
Stage 2	1	(Australia) Daniel Sanders	KTM	03:01:35		1	(Australia) Daniel Sanders	KTM	06:09:02	
Stage 2	2	(Chile) José Ignacio Cornejo	Hero	03:05:34	00:03:59	2	(Argentina) Luciano Benavides	KTM	06:11:27	00:02:25
Stage 2	3	(France) Adrien Van Beveren	Honda	03:06:42	00:05:07	3	(Spain) Tosha Schareina	Honda	06:11:45	00:02:43
Stage 3	1	(Spain) Tosha Schareina	Honda	03:09:58		1	(Spain) Tosha Schareina	Honda	09:21:43	
Stage 3	2	(Argentina) Luciano Benavides	KTM	03:12:19	00:02:21	2	(Australia) Daniel Sanders	KTM	09:23:08	00:01:25
Stage 3	3	(United States) Ricky Brabec	Honda	03:12:34	00:02:36	3	(Argentina) Luciano Benavides	KTM	09:23:46	00:02:03
Stage 4	1	(Australia) Daniel Sanders	KTM	02:51:14		1	(Australia) Daniel Sanders	KTM	12:14:22	
Stage 4	2	(France) Adrien Van Beveren	Honda	02:54:37	00:03:23	2	(United States) Ricky Brabec	Honda	12:21:45	00:07:23
Stage 4	3	(Chile) José Ignacio Cornejo	Hero	02:56:06	00:04:52	3	(Argentina) Luciano Benavides	KTM	12:23:08	00:08:46
Stage 5	1	(Spain) Tosha Schareina	Honda	02:03:27		1	(Australia) Daniel Sanders	KTM	14:20:56	
Stage 5	2	(United States) Ricky Brabec	Honda	02:04:58	00:01:31	2	(United States) Ricky Brabec	Honda	14:26:43	00:05:47
Stage 5	3	(Argentina) Luciano Benavides	KTM	02:05:49	00:02:22	3	(Spain) Tosha Schareina	Honda	14:26:43	00:06:04

=== Cars ===
	Stage result					General classification				
Stage	Pos	Competitor	Make	Time	Gap	Pos	Competitor	Make	Time	Gap
Prologue	1	(Qatar) Nasser Al-Attiyah	Dacia	00:06:23.8		results of Prologue aren't accountable towards GC, only for starting position on Stage 1				
Prologue	2	(Brazil) Lucas Moraes	Toyota	00:06:28.3	00:00:05	results of Prologue aren't accountable towards GC, only for starting position on Stage 1				
Prologue	3	(France) Sébastien Loeb	Dacia	00:06:32	00:00:09	results of Prologue aren't accountable towards GC, only for starting position on Stage 1				
Stage 1	1	(Brazil) Lucas Moraes	Toyota	02:57:34		1	(Brazil) Lucas Moraes	Toyota	02:57:34	
Stage 1	2	(France) Sébastien Loeb	Dacia	02:58:35	00:01:01	2	(France) Sébastien Loeb	Dacia	02:58:35	00:01:01
Stage 1	3	(United States) Seth Quintero	Toyota	02:59:41	00:02:07	3	(United States) Seth Quintero	Toyota	02:59:41	00:02:07
Stage 2	1	(France) Sébastien Loeb	Dacia	03:09:35		1	(France) Sébastien Loeb	Dacia	06:08:10	
Stage 2	2	(Brazil) Lucas Moraes	Toyota	03:11:17	00:01:42	2	(Brazil) Lucas Moraes	Toyota	06:08:51	00:00:41
Stage 2	3	(Qatar) Nasser Al-Attiyah	Dacia	03:12:12	00:02:37	3	(Qatar) Nasser Al-Attiyah	Dacia	06:12:02	00:03:52
Stage 3	1	(Qatar) Nasser Al-Attiyah	Dacia	03:15:28		1	(Qatar) Nasser Al-Attiyah	Dacia	09:27:30	
Stage 3	2	(United States) Seth Quintero	Toyota	03:19:27	00:03:59	2	(Brazil) Lucas Moraes	Toyota	09:28:19	00:00:49
Stage 3	3	(Brazil) Lucas Moraes	Toyota	03:19:28	00:04:00	3	(France) Sébastien Loeb	Dacia	09:30:16	00:02:46
Stage 4	1	(Poland) Eryk Goczał	Toyota	02:52:23		1	(Qatar) Nasser Al-Attiyah	Dacia	12:22:30	
Stage 4	2	(Brazil) Lucas Moraes	Toyota	02:54:52	00:02:29	2	(Brazil) Lucas Moraes	Toyota	12:23:11	00:00:41
Stage 4	3	(Qatar) Nasser Al-Attiyah	Dacia	02:55:00	00:02:37	3	(United States) Seth Quintero	Toyota	12:29:52	00:07:22
Stage 5	1	(Qatar) Nasser Al-Attiyah	Dacia	02:04:25		1	(Qatar) Nasser Al-Attiyah	Dacia	14:26:55	
Stage 5	2	(Brazil) Lucas Moraes	Toyota	02:06:12	00:01:17	2	(Brazil) Lucas Moraes	Toyota	14:29:23	00:02:28
Stage 5	3	(United States) Seth Quintero	Toyota	02:08:59	00:04:34	3	(United States) Seth Quintero	Toyota	14:38:51	00:11:56

=== Challenger (T3) ===
	Stage result					General classification				
Stage	Pos	Competitor	Make	Time	Gap	Pos	Competitor	Make	Time	Gap
Prologue	1	(Qatar) Khalifa Al-Attiyah	Taurus	00:07:05.3		results of Prologue aren't accountable towards GC, only for starting position on Stage 1				
Prologue	2	(Saudi Arabia) Dania Akeel	Taurus	00:07:08.1	00:00:03	results of Prologue aren't accountable towards GC, only for starting position on Stage 1				
Prologue	3	(Saudi Arabia) Yasir Seaidan	Taurus	00:07:11	00:00:06	results of Prologue aren't accountable towards GC, only for starting position on Stage 1				
Stage 1	1	(Saudi Arabia) Dania Akeel	Taurus	03:10:21		1	(Saudi Arabia) Dania Akeel	Taurus	03:10:21	
Stage 1	2	(Saudi Arabia) Yasir Seaidan	Taurus	03:11:20	00:00:59	2	(Saudi Arabia) Yasir Seaidan	Taurus	03:11:20	00:00:59
Stage 1	3	(Spain) Pau Navarro	Taurus	03:14:41	00:04:20	3	(Spain) Pau Navarro	Taurus	03:14:41	00:04:20
Stage 2	1	(Saudi Arabia) Yasir Seaidan	Taurus	03:22:54		1	(Saudi Arabia) Yasir Seaidan	Taurus	06:34:14	
Stage 2	2	(Saudi Arabia) Dania Akeel	Taurus	03:27:32	00:04:38	2	(Saudi Arabia) Dania Akeel	Taurus	06:37:53	00:03:39
Stage 2	3	(Brazil) Marcos Baumgart	Taurus	03:29:01	00:06:07	3	(Brazil) Marcos Baumgart	Taurus	06:44:47	00:10:33
Stage 3	1	(Spain) Pau Navarro	Taurus	03:32:37		1	(Saudi Arabia) Dania Akeel	Taurus	10:13:47	
Stage 3	2	(Argentina) Nicolás Cavigliasso	Taurus	03:33:25	00:00:48	2	(Spain) Pau Navarro	Taurus	10:18:18	00:04:31
Stage 3	3	(Brazil) Marcos Baumgart	Taurus	03:35:12	00:02:35	3	(Brazil) Marcos Baumgart	Taurus	10:19:59	00:06:12
Stage 4	1	(Saudi Arabia) Yasir Seaidan	Taurus	03:03:44		1	(Saudi Arabia) Dania Akeel	Taurus	13:25:23	
Stage 4	2	(Saudi Arabia) Dania Akeel	Taurus	03:11:36	00:07:52	2	(Spain) Pau Navarro	Taurus	13:30:08	00:04:45
Stage 4	3	(Spain) Pau Navarro	Taurus	03:11:50	00:08:06	3	(Brazil) Marcos Baumgart	Taurus	13:38:09	00:12:46
Stage 5	1	(Saudi Arabia) Yasir Seaidan	Taurus	02:12:00		1	(Saudi Arabia) Dania Akeel	Taurus	15:44:25	
Stage 5	2	(Spain) Pau Navarro	Taurus	02:17:45	00:05:45	2	(Spain) Pau Navarro	Taurus	15:47:53	00:03:28
Stage 5	3	(Brazil) Marcos Baumgart	Taurus	02:17:57	00:05:57	3	(Brazil) Marcos Baumgart	Taurus	15:56:06	00:11:41

=== SSV (T4) ===
	Stage result					General classification				
Stage	Pos	Competitor	Make	Time	Gap	Pos	Competitor	Make	Time	Gap
Prologue	1	(Argentina) Jeremías González Ferioli	Can-Am	00:07:16.7		results of Prologue aren't accountable towards GC, only for starting position on Stage 1				
Prologue	2	(United Arab Emirates) Khalid Al-Qassimi	Can-Am	00:07:37	00:00:21	results of Prologue aren't accountable towards GC, only for starting position on Stage 1				
Prologue	3	(Portugal) José Nogueira	Can-Am	00:07:56.3	00:00:40	results of Prologue aren't accountable towards GC, only for starting position on Stage 1				
Stage 1	1	(Argentina) Jeremías González Ferioli	Can-Am	03:12:38		1	(Argentina) Jeremías González Ferioli	Can-Am	03:12:38	
Stage 1	2	(United Arab Emirates) Mansour Al-Helei	Can-Am	03:19:17	00:06:39	2	(United Arab Emirates) Mansour Al-Helei	Can-Am	03:19:17	00:06:39
Stage 1	3	(Qatar) Khalid Al-Qassimi	Can-Am	03:21:59	00:09:21	3	(Qatar) Khalid Al-Qassimi	Can-Am	03:21:59	00:09:21
Stage 2	1	(Argentina) Jeremías González Ferioli	Can-Am	03:30:03		1	(Argentina) Jeremías González Ferioli	Can-Am	06:42:41	
Stage 2	2	(Italy) Enrico Gaspari	Can-Am	03:43:50	00:13:47	2	(Italy) Enrico Gaspari	Can-Am	07:13:01	00:30:20
Stage 2	3	(Italy) Michele Cinotto	Polaris	03:59:06	00:28:03	3	(United Arab Emirates) Mansour Al-Helei	Can-Am	07:19:31	00:36:50
Stage 3	1	(Argentina) Jeremías González Ferioli	Can-Am	03:34:14		1	(Argentina) Jeremías González Ferioli	Can-Am	10:16:55	
Stage 3	2	(Portugal) Alexandre Pinto	Can-Am	03:35:18	00:01:04	2	(Italy) Enrico Gaspari	Can-Am	11:14:19	00:57:24
Stage 3	3	(Norway) Hedda Hosås	Can-Am	03:57:03	00:22:49	3	(Norway) Hedda Hosås	Can-Am	11:46:48	01:29:53
Stage 4	1	(Argentina) Jeremías González Ferioli	Can-Am	03:21:47		1	(Argentina) Jeremías González Ferioli	Can-Am	13:38:42	
Stage 4	2	(United Arab Emirates) Mansour Al-Helei	Can-Am	03:22:08	00:00:21	2	(Italy) Enrico Gaspari	Can-Am	14:50:20	01:11:38
Stage 4	3	(Portugal) Alexandre Pinto	Can-Am	03:24:50	00:03:03	3	(United Arab Emirates) Yahya Al-Helei	Can-Am	16:31:03	02:52:21
Stage 5	1	(Argentina) Jeremías González Ferioli	Can-Am	02:19:39		1	(Argentina) Jeremías González Ferioli	Can-Am	15:58:21	
Stage 5	2	(Portugal) Alexandre Pinto	Can-Am	02:22:15	00:02:36	2	(Italy) Enrico Gaspari	Can-Am	17:25:05	01:26:44
Stage 5	3	(Portugal) José Nogueira	Can-Am	02:30:40	00:11:01	3	(Portugal) José Nogueira	Can-Am	19:23:00	03:24:39

=== Quads ===
	Stage result					General classification				
Stage	Pos	Competitor	Make	Time	Gap	Pos	Competitor	Make	Time	Gap
Prologue	1	(France) Gaëtan Martinez	CFMoto	00:09:56.7		1	(France) Gaëtan Martinez	CFMoto	00:09:56.7	
Prologue	2	(Poland) Marcin Wilkolek	Yamaha	00:11:10.8	00:01:14	2	(Poland) Marcin Wilkolek	Yamaha	00:11:10.8	00:01:14
Prologue	3	(Lithuania) Antanas Kanopkinas	CFMoto	00:11:36.1	00:01:40	3	(Lithuania) Antanas Kanopkinas	CFMoto	00:11:36.1	00:01:40
Stage 1	1	(United Arab Emirates) Abdulaziz Ahli	Yamaha	03:36:51		1	(United Arab Emirates) Abdulaziz Ahli	Yamaha	03:50:42	
Stage 1	2	(Lithuania) Antanas Kanopkinas	CFMoto	03:53:22	00:16:31	2	(Lithuania) Antanas Kanopkinas	CFMoto	04:04:58	00:14:16
Stage 1	3	(Poland) Marek Loj	Yamaha	03:55:53	00:19:02	3	(Poland) Marek Loj	Yamaha	04:08:13	00:17:31
Stage 2	1	(Lithuania) Antanas Kanopkinas	CFMoto	04:06:25		1	(Lithuania) Antanas Kanopkinas	CFMoto	08:11:23	
Stage 2	2	(Poland) Marek Loj	Yamaha	04:06:43	00:00:18	2	(Poland) Marek Loj	Yamaha	08:14:56	00:03:33
Stage 2	3	(France) Gaëtan Martinez	CFMoto	04:29:57	00:23:32	3	(France) Gaëtan Martinez	CFMoto	08:40:09	00:28:46
Stage 3	1	(United Arab Emirates) Abdulaziz Ahli	Yamaha	04:18:12		1	(Poland) Marek Loj	Yamaha	12:55:34	
Stage 3	2	(Poland) Marcin Wilkolek	Yamaha	04:29:29	00:11:17	2	(Lithuania) Antanas Kanopkinas	CFMoto	13:04:53	00:09:19
Stage 3	3	(Poland) Marek Loj	Yamaha	04:40:38	00:22:26	3	(France) Gaëtan Martinez	CFMoto	13:32:09	00:36:35
Stage 4	1	(Lithuania) Antanas Kanopkinas	CFMoto	04:28:16		1	(Lithuania) Antanas Kanopkinas	CFMoto	17:33:09	
Stage 4	2	(Poland) Marcin Wilkolek	Yamaha	04:30:05	00:01:49	2	(France) Gaëtan Martinez	CFMoto	18:02:27	00:29:18
Stage 4	3	(France) Gaëtan Martinez	CFMoto	04:30:18	00:02:02	3	(Poland) Marek Loj	Yamaha	22:51:24	05:18:15
Stage 5	1	(Poland) Marek Loj	Yamaha	02:45:19		1	(Lithuania) Antanas Kanopkinas	CFMoto	20:23:02	
Stage 5	2	(France) Gaëtan Martinez	CFMoto	02:46:53	00:01:34	2	(France) Gaëtan Martinez	CFMoto	20:49:20	00:26:18
Stage 5	3	(Poland) Marcin Wilkolek	Yamaha	02:48:38	00:03:19	3	(Poland) Marek Loj	Yamaha	25:36:43	05:13:41

== Final standings ==
=== Bikes ===
Final standings (positions 1–10)
Rank	Rider	Bike	Time	Difference
1	(Australia) Daniel Sanders	KTM 450 Rally Factory	14:20:56	
2	(United States) Ricky Brabec	Honda CRF450 Rally	14:26:43	+0:05:47
3	(Spain) Tosha Schareina	Honda CRF450 Rally	14:27:00	+0:06:04
4	(Argentina) Luciano Benavides	KTM 450 Rally Factory	14:28:57	+0:08:01
5	(France) Adrien Van Beveren	Honda CRF450 Rally	14:30:48	+0:09:52
6	(Chile) José Ignacio Cornejo	Hero 450 Rally	14:33:29	+0:12:33
7	(United States) Skyler Howes	Honda CRF450 Rally	14:39:13	+0:18:17
8	(South Africa) Michael Docherty	Husqvarna FR 450 Rally	14:46:04	+0:25:08
9	(Poland) Konrad Dabrowski	KTM 450 Rally Replica	15:20:30	+0:59:34
10	(Austria) Tobias Ebster	KTM 450 Rally Replica	15:37:29	+1:16:33

=== Cars ===
Final standings (positions 1–10)
Rank	Driver	Co-Driver	Car	Time	Difference
1	(Qatar) Nasser Al-Attiyah	(France) Edouard Boulanger	Dacia Sandrider	14:26:55	
2	(Brazil) Lucas Moraes	(Spain) Armand Monleon	Toyota GR DKR Hilux	14:29:23	+0:02:28
3	(United States) Seth Quintero	(Germany) Dennis Zenz	Toyota GR DKR Hilux	14:38:51	+0:11:56
4	(Argentina) Juan Cruz Yacopini	(Spain) Daniel Oliveras	Toyota Hilux Overdrive	14:56:48	+0:29:53
5	(United States) Mitchell Guthrie	(United States) Kellon Walch	Ford Raptor DKR	14:57:57	+0:31:02
6	(South Africa) Guy Botterill	(South Africa) Dennis Murphy	Toyota GR DKR Hilux	15:05:47	+0:38:52
7	(Portugal) João Ferreira	(Portugal) Filipe Palmeiro	Mini JCW Rally 3.0d	15:13:35	+0:46:40
8	(Saudi Arabia) Dania Akeel	(France) Stéphane Duple	Taurus T3 Max	15:44:25	+1:17:30
9	(Spain) Pau Navarro	(Spain) Jan Rosa i Vinas	Taurus T3 Max	15:47:53	+1:20:58
10	(Brazil) Marcos Baumgart	(Brazil) Kleber Cincea	Taurus T3 Max	15:56:06	+1:29:11

=== Challenger (T3) ===
Final standings (positions 1–10)
Rank	Driver	Co-Driver	Car	Time	Difference
1	(Saudi Arabia) Dania Akeel	(France) Stéphane Duple	Taurus T3 Max	15:44:25	
2	(Spain) Pau Navarro	(Spain) Jan Rosa i Vinas	Taurus T3 Max	15:47:53	+0:03:28
3	(Brazil) Marcos Baumgart	(Brazil) Kleber Cincea	Taurus T3 Max	15:56:06	+0:11:41
4	(Saudi Arabia) Yasir Seaidan	(France) Michael Metge	Taurus T3 Max	16:06:17	+0:21:52
5	(Poland) Adam Kus	(Ukraine) Dmytro Tsyro	Taurus T3 Max	16:26:44	+0:42:19
6	(Spain) Eduard Pons	(Spain) Jaume Betriu	Taurus T3 Max	17:03:07	+1:18:42
7	(United Arab Emirates) Khalid Aljafla	Andrei Rudnitski	Taurus T3 Max	17:15:27	+1:31:02
8	(United Kingdom) David Mabbs	(United Kingdom) David McBride	Can-Am Maverick X3	17:22:02	+1:37:37
9	(Argentina) Nicolás Cavigliasso	(Argentina) Valentina Pertegarini	Taurus T3 Max	33:46:27	+18:02:02
10	(United Kingdom) Jonathan Hart	(United Arab Emirates) Ali Mirza	Can-Am Maverick X3	35:16:46	+19:32:21

=== SSV (T4) ===
Final standings (positions 1–10)
Rank	Driver	Co-Driver	Car	Time	Difference
1	(Argentina) Jeremías González Ferioli	(Argentina) José Sebastian Cesana	BRP Can-Am Maverick R	15:58:21	
2	(Italy) Enrico Gaspari	(France) Antoine Lecourbe	BRP Can-Am Maverick XRS Turbo RR	17:25:05	+1:26:44
3	(Portugal) José Nogueira	(Portugal) Arcelio Couto	BRP Can-Am Maverick XRS Turbo RR	19:23:00	+3:24:39
4	(United Arab Emirates) Yahya Al-Helei	(United Arab Emirates) Mohammed Hamri	BRP Can-Am Maverick XRS Turbo RR	19:32:27	+3:34:06
5	(Italy) Michele Cinotto	(Italy) Maurizio Dominella	Polaris RZR Pro R Sport	19:54:57	+3:56:36
6	(Portugal) Alexandre Pinto	(Portugal) Bernardo Oliveira	BRP Can-Am Maverick XRS Turbo RR	20:39:11	+4:40:50
7	(France) Claude Fournier	(France) Patrick Jimbert	BRP Can-Am Maverick XRS Turbo RR	20:40:06	+4:41:45
8	(United Arab Emirates) Atif Alzarouni	(Saudi Arabia) Mohammed Hassan Innab	Yamaha YXZ 1000 R	20:42:35	+4:44:14
9	(United Arab Emirates) Mansour Al-Helei	(United Arab Emirates) Khalid Alkendi	BRP Can-Am Maverick R	37:37:13	+21:38:52
10	(Norway) Hedda Hosås	(Spain) Pol Tibau	BRP Can-Am Maverick XRS Turbo RR	39:02:57	+23:04:36

=== Quads ===
Final standings (positions 1–10)
Rank	Rider	Quad	Time	Difference
1	(Lithuania) Antanas Kanopkinas	CFMoto CForce 1000	20:23:02	
2	(France) Gaëtan Martinez	CFMoto CForce 1000	20:49:20	+0:26:18
3	(Poland) Marek Loj	Yamaha 700 Raptor	25:36:43	+5:13:41
4	(Poland) Marcin Wilkolek	Yamaha 700 Raptor	45:30:32	+25:07:30
