= Seth Quintero =

American rally driver (born 2002)

- Nationality: (United States) American
- Born: September 12, 2002 (age 24) California, U.S.
- Current team: Toyota Gazoo Racing

Seth Quintero (born September 12, 2002) is an American off-road racing driver. He is currently part of Red Bull's rallying team for rally raid events and competes in the World Rally-Raid Championship. He also competes for Toyota Gazoo Racing in the ARA National Championship.

He holds the record for the most number of stage wins in a single Dakar, with 12 stage victories in the 2022 Dakar.

== Career ==
Quintero grew up in San Marcos, California, where by age four he was already riding ATVs. Quintero began competing in SSV racing at age 10, and at age 11 won the Junior UTV World Championship. In 2015, Quintero won the Junior UTV World Championship again as well as winning the World Off Road Championship Series.

In 2018, Quintero moved up to the professional ranks with backing from energy drink company Red Bull. Quintero finished second at the Mint 400 and the Vegas to Reno events during his debut season. In 2019, Quintero won the Best in the Desert championship in the UTV Pro category, winning six events including the Mint 400.

In 2020, Quintero began competing internationally, and one year later, in 2021, began competing at the top level of SSV racing, including making his debut at the Dakar Rally and making two appearances in the 2021 FIA World Cup for Cross-Country Rallies. In the 2021 Dakar Rally, Quintero won six stages, in the process setting a new record for youngest stage winner in Dakar history. At the 2022 Dakar Rally, Quintero set a new record for most stage wins in a single running of the event, claiming 12 stage victories out of 13 total. However, in the only stage he failed to win, Quintero lost over 17 hours due to mechanical failures, resulting in a distant 16th place finish in the overall rankings. Besides the Dakar, Quintero also contested the full season of the inaugural World Rally-Raid Championship, where he finished second in points with an event win at the Rallye du Maroc.

At the 2023 Dakar Rally, Quintero secured his first podium in the event with a second place finish overall and two stage victories, finishing only behind his teammate Austin Jones. After winning the Abu Dhabi Desert Challenge, the American went on to clinch the T3 title by taking the runner-up spot at the final round in Morocco, narrowly beating Mitch Guthrie and Austin Jones.

For 2024, it was announced that Quintero would be stepping up to the Car/T1+ class with Toyota Gazoo Racing. He would be taking part in the 2024 Dakar Rally and the 2024 World Rally-Raid Championship, alongside his navigator/co-driver of multiple past campaigns, Dennis Zenz. After experiencing troubles at the Dakar, the American would impress in Abu Dhabi, winning stage 3 and coming third overall, scoring his first podium in the top class. Though an early issue with his car's engine drive belt took Quintero out of contention in Portugal, he described the event as "the most fun rally I've ever done". Quintero and Zenz then got stuck on a cliff while trying to overtake Christian Baumgart in stage 1 of the Desafío Ruta 40; they later won stage 3 of the rally but fell behind with multiple stops in stage 4 thanks to a broken damper and finished 11th. Despite further mechanical issues in Morocco, Quintero finished fifth, which secured him sixth place in the overall drivers' standings.

To start off his 2025 W2RC campaign, Quintero won the opening stake at the 2025 Dakar Rally. Having lost time during the two-day endurance stage and dropped further due to punctures in stage 4, Quintero also won stage 5 by one second after inheriting first place from Nasser Al-Attiyah, who had been penalised for losing a spare wheel.

== Rally results ==
=== Dakar Rally results ===
Year	Class	Vehicle	Position	Stages won
2021	Light Prototype	(Belgium) OT3	18th	6
2022	Light Prototype	(Belgium) OT3	16th	12
2023	Light Prototype	(Canada) Can-Am	2nd	2
2024	Car	(Japan) Toyota GR DKR Hilux EVO T1U	101st	0
2025	Car	(Japan) Toyota GR DKR Hilux EVO T1U	9th	2
2026	Car	(Japan) Toyota GR DKR Hilux EVO T1U	9th	1

=== Complete World Rally-Raid Championship results ===
(key)

Year	Team	Car	Class	1	2	3	4	5	Pos.	Points
2022	Red Bull Off-Road Junior Team USA	Overdrive Racing OT3	T3	DAK; 9^{63}	ABU; 3^{34}	MOR; 1^{47}	AND; 2^{15}		2nd	169
2023	Red Bull Off-Road Junior Team USA by BFG	BRP Can-Am Maverick XRS	T3	DAK; 2^{77}	ABU; 1^{50}	SON; 9^{18}	DES; 8^{20}	MOR; 2^{36}	1st	201
2024	Toyota Gazoo Racing	Toyota GR DKR Hilux EVO T1U	Ultimate	DAK; 101^{5}	ABU; 3^{30}	PRT; 43^{4}	DES; 11^{16}	MOR; 5^{26}	6th	81
2025	Toyota Gazoo Racing	Toyota GR DKR Hilux EVO T1U	Ultimate	DAK; 9^{28}	ABU; 3^{32}	ZAF; 6^{19}	PRT; Ret^{5}	MOR; 58^{13}	5th	97
2026	Toyota Gazoo Racing W2RC	Toyota GR DKR Hilux EVO T1U	Ultimate	DAK; 9^{24}	PRT; 2^{37}	DES; 1^{40}	MOR; 1^{34}	ABU	1st*	135*

* Season still in progress
