= Henk Lategan =

South African rally-raid driver (born 1994)

- Nationality: (South Africa) South African
- Born: 5 May 1994 (age 32) Johannesburg, South Africa
- Current team: Toyota Gazoo Racing

Henk Lategan (born 5 May 1994) is a South African off-road racing driver. He finished second overall in the 2025 Dakar Rally and won the South African Rally-Raid Championship four times. Lategan currently competes for Toyota Gazoo Racing in the World Rally-Raid Championship.

== Career ==
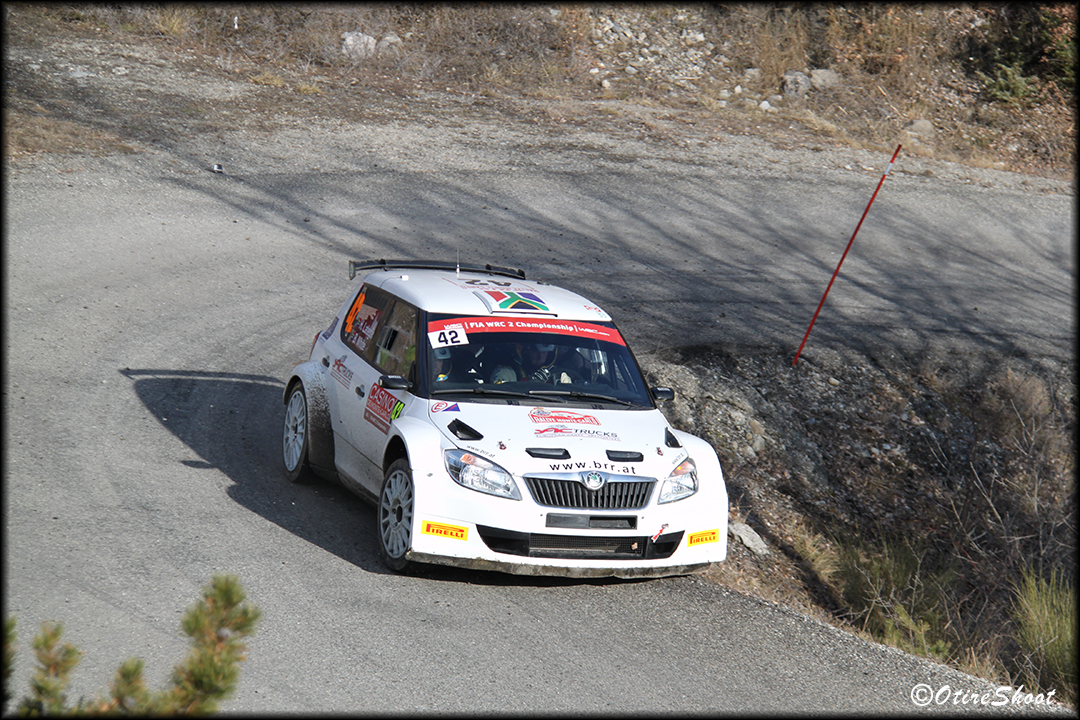
Lategan at the 2015 Monte Carlo Rally

Lategan started rallying in his native South Africa, competing in the national championship from 2011 onwards. He also raced in the European Rally Championship, making his debut at the 2013 Croatia Rally. After making a switch to Rally raid in 2017, Lategan became the youngest driver to win the South African Rally-Raid Championship in 2019. After that, Lategan and co-driver Brett Cummings claimed back-to-back titles in 2020 and 2021. Lategan made his Dakar Rally debut in 2021. He placed on the podium in stages 3 and 4 before crashing during stage 5; Lategan broke his collar bone bone in the process.

Lategan returned to the event in 2022. Though Lategan only finished 31st overall, he claimed his maiden Dakar stage win on day 5. Lategan also won the final stage.

Having fought for an overall podium during the first half of the 2023 edition, Lategan finished fifth overall.

After missing the 2024 Dakar Rally with a dislocated shoulder, Lategan recovered in time to win the SARRC for a fourth time. Lategan returned to the Dakar in 2025. After a close battle with Yazeed Al-Rajhi, Lategan came up short by less than four minutes. Lategan's main time lost came during the dune and sand-focused stage 11, where dune expert Al-Rajhi surged ahead of the leading Lategan. After withdrawing from the Abu Dhabi Desert Challenge, Lategan contested the final three rounds of the 2025 World Rally-Raid Championship. With a victory at his home event, second place in Portugal, and the points scored at Dakar, Lategan entered the final round in Morocco in a three-way title fight with Nasser Al-Attiyah and Lucas Moraes. However, Lategan suffered a rear differential failure during stage 2 at Morocco, ending his championship hopes. Nevertheless, Lategan came back by winning stage 3 and ended the season third in the overall points standings.

== Rally results ==
=== South African National Rally Championship results ===
Year	Entrant	Car	Class	1	2	3	4	5	6	7	8	Pos.	Points
2012		Volkswagen Polo MK4 S2000	S1600	TOT; Ret	SAS; 9	GAU	VWR; 7	RSA; Ret	TOY; 10	POL; 18	GRR	18th	41
2013	Sasol Volkswagen	Volkswagen Polo MK5 S2000	S2000	TOT; 23	SAS; 4	GAU; 5	VWR; 13	FOR; 2	TOY; 8	POL; Ret	GRR; Ret	11th	70
2014	Volkswagen Sasolracing	Volkswagen Polo MK5 S2000	S2000	TOU; 5	SAS; 4	PMC; 2	VWR; 6	ITC; 4	TOY; 8	POL; Ret	BEL; 4	7th	91.5
2015	Volkswagen Sasolracing	Volkswagen Polo MK5 S2000	S2000	TOU; 3	SAS (7)	SEC (6)	BEL; 6	VWR; 6	ITT; 7	TOY; 4	POL; 2	5th	39.5

=== Complete WRC results ===
Year	Entrant	Car	1	2	3	4	5	6	7	8	9	10	11	12	13	WDC	Points
2015	Henk Lategan	Škoda Fabia S2000	MON; Ret	SWE	MEX	ARG	POR; 42	ITA	POL	FIN	GER	AUS	FRA	ESP	GBR	NC	0

=== South African Rally-Raid Championship results ===
Year	Entrant	Car	Class	1	2	3	4	5	6	7	8	9	Pos.	Points
2017	Ford NWM Puma Lubricants	Ford Ranger	T	LIC; 5	BAT; Ret	BOT; Ret	HAR; 12	SUN; 9	ACG; C				?	?
2018	Toyota Gazoo Racing SA	Toyota Hilux	FIA	MPU; 6^{10}	DUN; 6^{10}	KAL1; 1^{30}	KAL2; Ret	BRO; 1^{30}	HAR; 2^{23}	GOL; 2^{23}			2nd	126
2019	Toyota Gazoo Racing SA	Toyota Hilux	FIA	MPU; 2^{23}	BER; 1^{30}	KAL1; 1^{30}	KAL2; 17	BRO; 1^{30}	LIC; 2^{23}	PAR; 1^{30}			1st	166
2020	Toyota Gazoo Racing SA	Toyota Hilux	FIA	MPU; 1^{30}	SUG; C	CLA; C	KAL1; C	KAL2; C	BRO; 1^{30}	AGR; 1^{30}	PAR; 2^{23}	VAA; 1^{30}	1st	143
2021	Toyota Gazoo Racing SA	Toyota GR DKR Hilux	FIA	MPU	SUG; 2^{23}	TGR; 2^{37}	MEG1; 1^{30}	MEG2; 3^{18}	VRY; 1^{30}	PAR; 1^{30}			1st	168
2022	Toyota Gazoo Racing SA	Toyota GR DKR Hilux	T1+	MPU; 1^{30}	TGR; Ret	BRO; 1^{30}	NAM1; 1^{30}	NAM2; 1^{30}	PAR1; 1^{30}	PAR2; Ret			2nd	150
2023	Toyota Gazoo Racing SA	Toyota GR DKR Hilux	T1+	NKO; 1^{30}	SUG; 1^{30}	TGR; 19^{11}	PAR1; 1^{30}	PAR2; 4^{15}	REN; Ret	WAT			4th	116
2024	Toyota Gazoo Racing	Toyota Hilux IMT Evo	Ultimate	NKO; Ret^{5}	VRY; 1^{35}	TGR; 1^{50}	PAR; 2^{28}	VAA; 1^{35}	PHA; 2^{28}	KEC; 1^{35}			1st	216

=== Dakar Rally results ===
Year	Class	Vehicle	Position	Stages won
2021	Car	(Japan) Toyota GR DKR Hilux	DNF	0
2022	Car	(Japan) Toyota GR DKR Hilux	31st	2
2023	Car	(Japan) Toyota GR DKR Hilux	5th	0
2025	Car	(Japan) Toyota GR DKR Hilux EVO T1U	2nd	2
2026	Car	(Japan) Toyota GR DKR Hilux EVO T1U	21st	1

=== Complete World Rally-Raid Championship results ===
(key)

Year	Team	Car	Class	1	2	3	4	5	Pos.	Points
2025	Toyota Gazoo Racing	Toyota GR DKR Hilux EVO T1U	Ultimate	DAK; 2^{55}	ABU; WD	ZAF; 1^{39}	PRT; 2^{37}	MOR; 13^{11}	3rd	142
2026	Toyota Gazoo Racing	Toyota GR DKR Hilux EVO T1U	Ultimate	DAK; 21^{20}	PRT; Ret^{1}	DES; 2^{35}	MOR; 3^{29}	ABU	5th*	85*

^{*}Season still in progress.
