= Ricky Brabec =

American motorcycle racer

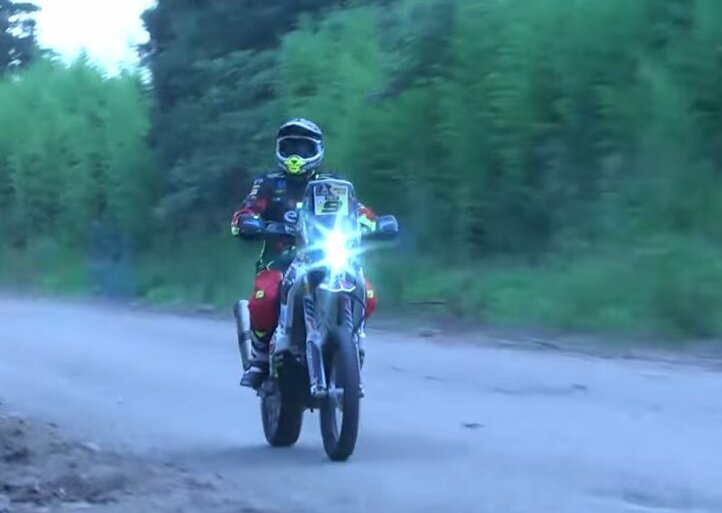
- Brabec competing in the 2016 Dakar Rally
- Born: Richard William Brabec; April 21, 1991 (age 35) San Bernardino, California, US

Dakar Rally career
- Debut season: 2016
- Starts: 11
- Wins: 2 (12 stage wins)
- Best finish: 1st in 2020, 2024

Richard William Brabec (born April 21, 1991) is an American professional off-road and rally raid motorcycle racer. He is prominent for being the first American competitor to win the motorcycle division of the Dakar Rally in 2020. He won the Dakar again in 2024.

== Biography ==
Brabec was born in San Bernardino, California, and started BMX when he was five years old. When he was 15, he and his family moved to the desert city of Hesperia, California. First trying motocross, Brabec began desert racing in 2011.

In 2014, Brabec won the Baja 1000, Baja 500 and San Felipe 250. He was fifth in the bike category at Abu Dhabi Desert Challenge in 2015. In 2016, he was sixth at Merzouga Rally and seventh at Atacama Rally in the bike category.

Brabec made his Dakar Rally debut in 2016 and finished in 9th. In 2017, he won his first stage, but failed to finish the race. In 2018, he was running in sixth place when he was forced out of the race. It was the second time in his career that he retired from a race. In 2019, he retired for the third consecutive year. In 2020, he won the bike category and two stages.

Brabec also represented the United States at three International Six Days Enduro events. The International Six Days Enduro is a form of off-road motorcycle Olympics that is the oldest annual competition sanctioned by the FIM, dating back to 1913.

== Career results ==
=== Dakar Rally results ===
Year	Class	Vehicle	Position	Stage wins
2016	Bikes	(Japan) Honda	9th	0
2017	Bikes	(Japan) Honda	DNF	1
2018	Bikes	(Japan) Honda	DNF	0
2019	Bikes	(Japan) Honda	DNF	1
2020	Bikes	(Japan) Honda	1st	2
2021	Bikes	(Japan) Honda	2nd	4
2022	Bikes	(Japan) Honda	7th	0
2023	Bikes	(Japan) Honda	DNF	1
2024	Bikes	(Japan) Honda	1st	1
2025	Bikes	(Japan) Honda	5th	1
2026	Bikes	(Japan) Honda	2nd	1

=== World Rally-Raid Championship ===
Year	Team	Vehicle	Class	1	2	3	4	5	Pos.	Points
2022	Monster Energy Honda Team	Honda CRF450 Rally	RallyGP	DAK; 7	ABU; 2	MAR; 3	AND; 7		2nd	59
2023	Monster Energy Honda Team	Honda CRF450 Rally	RallyGP	DAK; Ret	ABU; 7	SON; 7	DES; 2	MAR; Ret	9th	38
2024	Monster Energy Honda Team	Honda CRF450 Rally	RallyGP	DAK; 1	ABU; Ret	POR; Ret	DES; 1	MAR; Ret	4th	63
2025	Monster Energy Honda HRC	Honda CRF450 Rally	RallyGP	DAK; 5	ABU; 2	SUD; 3	POR; 4	MAR; 3	3rd	82
2026	Monster Energy Honda HRC	Honda CRF450 Rally	RallyGP	DAK; 2	POR; 8	DES	MAR	ABU		38

=== Other results ===
- Baja 1000
  - (gold) 2014
- Baja 500
  - (gold) 2014
- San Felipe 250
  - (gold) 2014
- Abu Dhabi Desert Challenge
  - 5th 2015
  - 6th 2018
- Atacama Rally
  - 7th 2016
  - 9th 2018
  - 6th 2019
- Merzouga Rally
  - 6th 2016
- Dakar Rally
  - (gold) 2020
- Rallye OiLibya du Maroc
  - (bronze) 2017
  - (bronze) 2018
  - 5th 2019
