= Mengoub =

Town in Morocco

Coordinates: 32°16′58.81″N 2°21′59.60″W

Mengoub is a town in the Sahara Desert of North-eastern Morocco near the border with Algeria. It is a mountainous area and was the site of a Vichy France forced labor camp in the Second World War.

The Rallye du Maroc route has been through Mengoub.
