= Pau Navarro (racing driver) =

Spanish racing driver (born 2004)

- Born: Pau Navarro Ferrer; 27 May 2004 (age 22)

Pau Navarro Ferrer (born 27 May 2004) is a Spanish rally raid racer who competes in the World Rally-Raid Championship.

== Career ==
Navarro competed in the 2024 World Rally-Raid Championship driving for the X-Raid Mini JCW Team in the Ultimate class. He competed in the Dakar Rally, where he crashed out in the second stage. He also competed in the Abu Dhabi Desert Challenge and Rallye du Maroc, where he finished in ninth place in the former.

In the 2025 season, Navarro signed with Team BBR in the Challenger category. In the 2025 Dakar Rally, he finished in third place. He competed in the Abu Dhabi Desert Challenge and finished in second place behind Dania Akeel. He would win his first round of the W2RC in the Rallye du Maroc, while finishing second in the championship behind Nicolás Cavigliasso.

At the opening round of the 2026 season, Navarro won the Dakar Rally in his category.
