= Ebro (marque) =

Spanish automobile brand

- Industry: Automotive
- Founded: 2023
- Headquarters: Barcelona, Catalonia, Spain
- Key people: Pedro Calef (CEO)
- Owner: Chery
- Website: http://www.ebroauto.com/

Ebro is a Spanish automobile brand that emerged in 2023 with the help of Chinese industrial giant Chery, reviving the commercial name of the former manufacturer Motor Ibérica.

== Foundation ==
Until the end of 2021, the Japanese manufacturer Nissan was building cars in a factory in Barcelona's Zona Franca, which was acquired in the 1980s from Motor Ibérica, but despite large investments, it became unprofitable in its last years of operation. Its production focused on commercial and off-road models, such as the Nissan Navara and Nissan NV200, vehicles with low sales volume, but the facilities remained in operation due to government and union pressure. The economic shutdown caused by COVID-19 led to mass layoffs, and a subsequent strike, from which the factory never recovered; all in the context of a restructuring of the Renault-Nissan-Mitsubishi alliance, which sought to change the spheres of influence of each of its brands, reducing Nissan's presence in Europe in favor of Renault.

Following the departure of the Franco-Japanese group from Barcelona, a joint venture called EcoPower Automotive, formed by four Spanish companies, Jaton Racing, Api Brothers, Btech and Nexus Projectes, presented a project to resume production at the factory with an electric pick-up model heavily based on the Navara that was previously manufactured there; also resuming the commercial name of the industry's first owner. This vehicle, originally planned to be sold to company fleets rather than to individuals, has not yet gone beyond being a prototype and a statement of intent.

Already in 2024, EcoPower Automotive, now renamed EV Motors, reached an agreement with Chery whereby both companies formed a joint venture with the aim of starting the production of their models in Europe, thus avoiding tariff impositions and allowing them to penetrate a market in which until then they had a testimonial presence. Assembly began in November of the same year, with a sales forecast of 150,000 units and an investment of 400 million euros until 2029.

Initially, Ebro assembled cars under the CKD system, receiving most of the disassembled components from Chery's facilities in China and then joining the parts together, although the short term plan is to manufacture cars from scratch after adapting and modernising facilities that had become obsolete due to a lack of investment from the previous manufacturer (Nissan).

== In competition ==
Ebro will participate in the 2026 Dakar Rally with a derivative of the Century CR7 called the S800-XRR T1+.

== Products ==
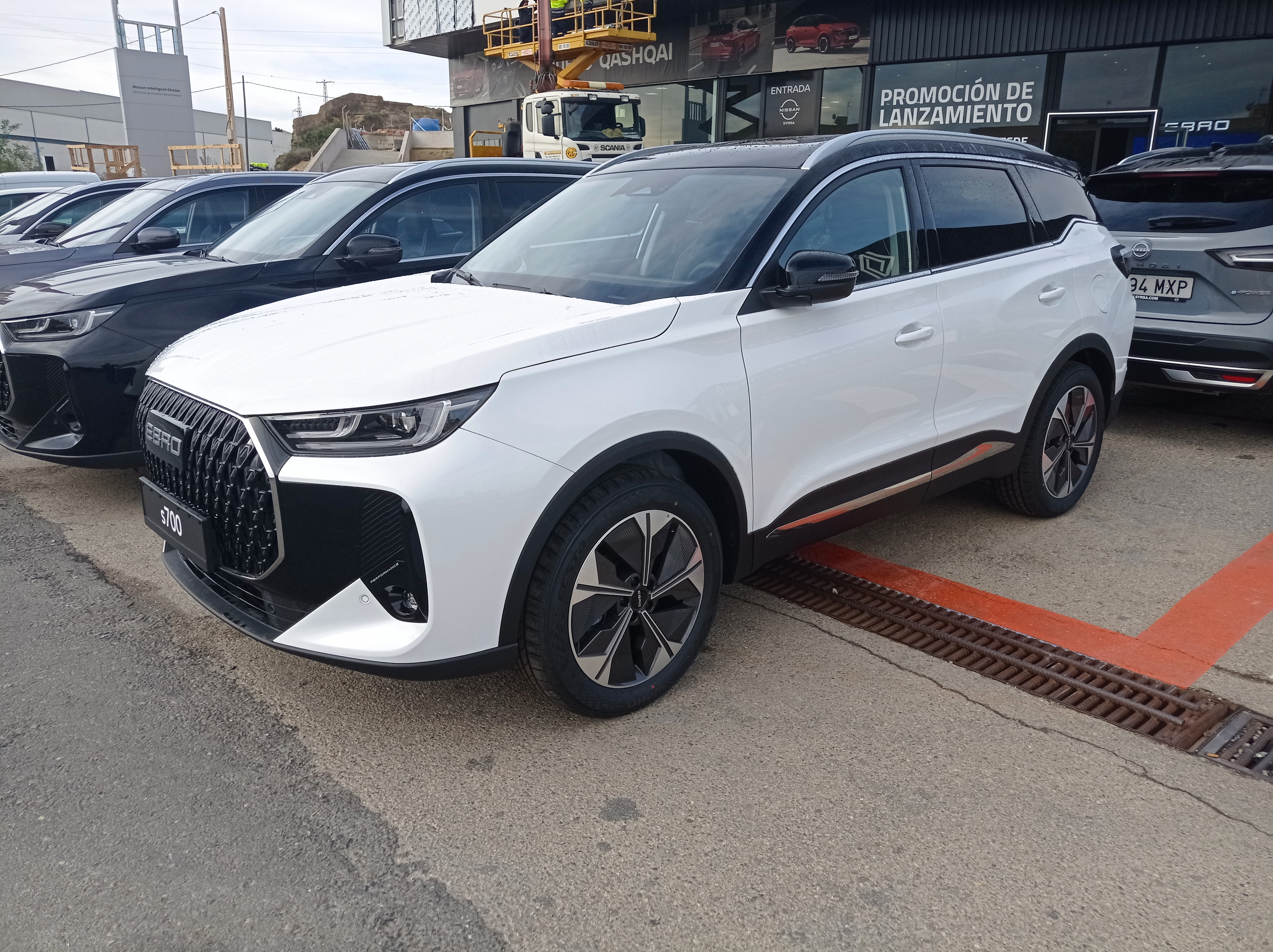
S700 on display

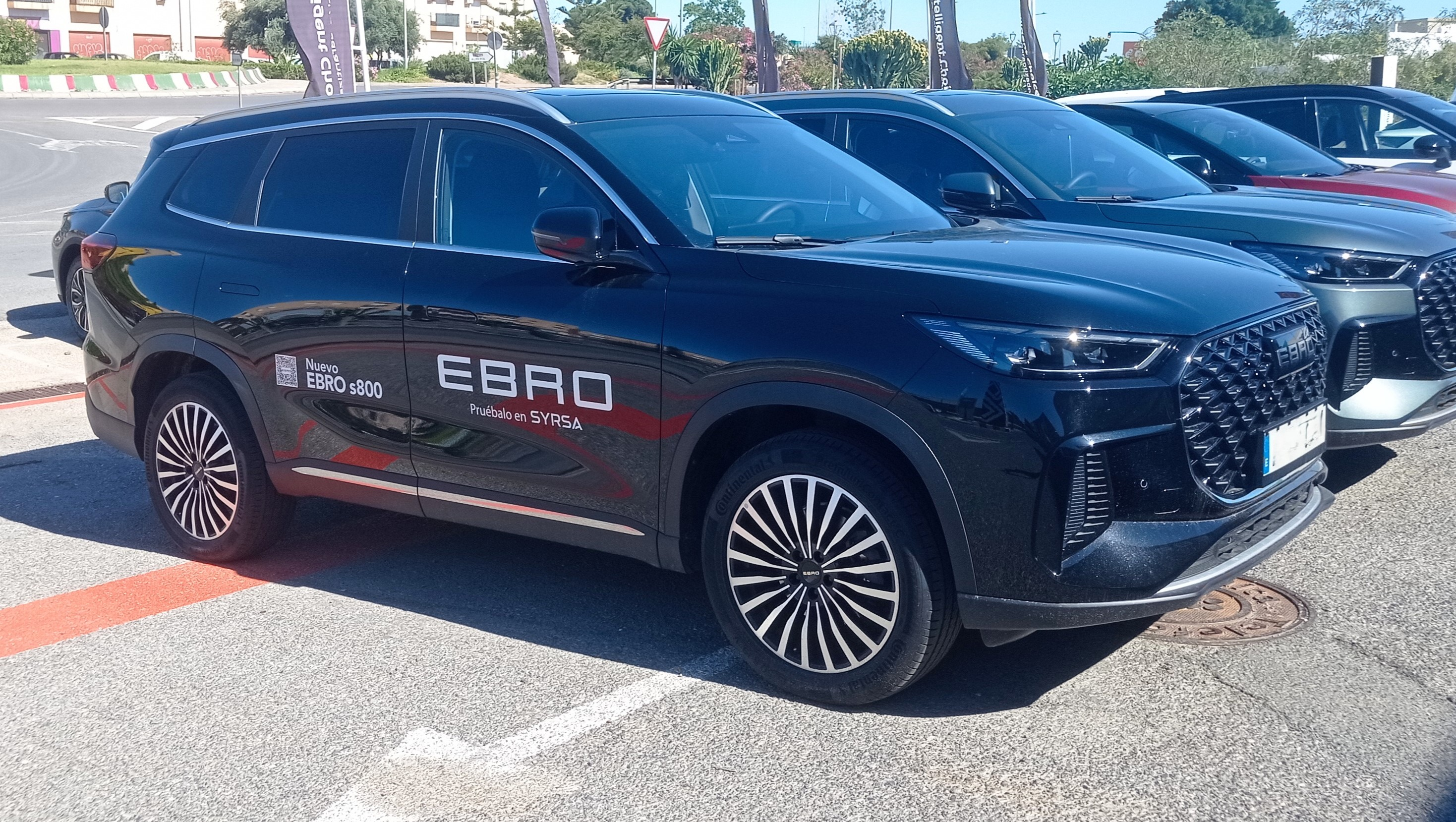
S800 on display

- Ebro Pickup
- Ebro S400, based on the Chery Tiggo 4.
- Ebro S700, based on the Chery Tiggo 7.
- Ebro S800, based on the Chery Tiggo 8.
- Ebro S900, based on the Chery Tiggo 9X.
