= Century CR7 =

- Category: T1+
- Designer: Julien Hardy
- Predecessor: Century CR6

Technical specifications
- Chassis: Multitubular
- Engine: 2,894 cc (176.6 cu in)
- Transmission: SADEV 6 sequential speeds
- Weight: 2,010 kg (4,431 lb)
- Brakes: 6-piston callipers, water-cooled
- Tires: BF Goodrich on Braid tires

Competition history
- Notable drivers: (South Africa) Brian Baragwanath (France) Mathieu Serradori
- Debut: 2023

The Century CR7 is a competition buggy manufactured by the South African rally raid specialist Century. It was unveiled in 2023 and made its competitive debut in the South African Rally Raid Championship, with a view to its development for the 2024 Dakar Rally. It competes in the T1+ category, in which it has twice finished in the top ten in the aforementioned event.

This is an all-wheel-drive car, unlike most of the manufacturer's previous models, equipped with a V6 gasoline engine from the Audi RS 4, which produces 430hp at 5,000 rpm and has a torque of 660 Nm at 3,800 rpm, monitored by a torque meter required by the FIA. This model is focused on participation in customer racing, although Century also has its own team.

Although it retains much of the aesthetics of its predecessor, the CR6, the mechanical aspects are very different, housing a different engine with different needs and featuring front suspension with greater travel which, even so, manages to lower its centre of gravity.

Furthermore, it inherits the CR6's double wishbone rear suspension and exterior dimensions, with the exception of height.

== Derivatives ==
=== Ebro S800-XRR T1+ ===
The Ebro S800-XRR T1+ is a derivative of the CR7, acquired by the Spanish company Ebro, which has undergone few modifications, mostly aesthetic, applied by the team of French driver Mathieu Serradori. Laia Sanz will be at the wheel.

=== Santana Pick-Up T1+ Ultimate ===
The Santana Pick-Up T1+ Ultimate is a derivative of the CR7, aesthetically modified by the Spanish company Santana Motor to give it a look more similar to the Santana 400, the production model, while retaining the mechanical components. It will be driven by Jesús Calleja.
