= Charan Moore =

South African motorcycle racer

- Nationality: South African
- Teams: Husqvarna

Championship titles
- 2023: Dakar Rally (Original by Motul)

Charan Moore is a South African motorcycle racer. He won the Original by Motul class in the 2023 Dakar Rally for bike competitors competing without any kind of assistance.

== Career ==
Moore made his Dakar Rally debut in 2022, finishing in 34th place in the motorcycle class and fourth in the Original by Motul category. He returned in 2023, this time winning in the ObM category while finishing 28th overall.

== Career results ==
=== Dakar Rally results ===
Year	Position	Notes
2022	34th	
2023	28th	Winner Original by Motul Class
