= Edgar Canet =

Spanish motorcycle racer (born 2005)

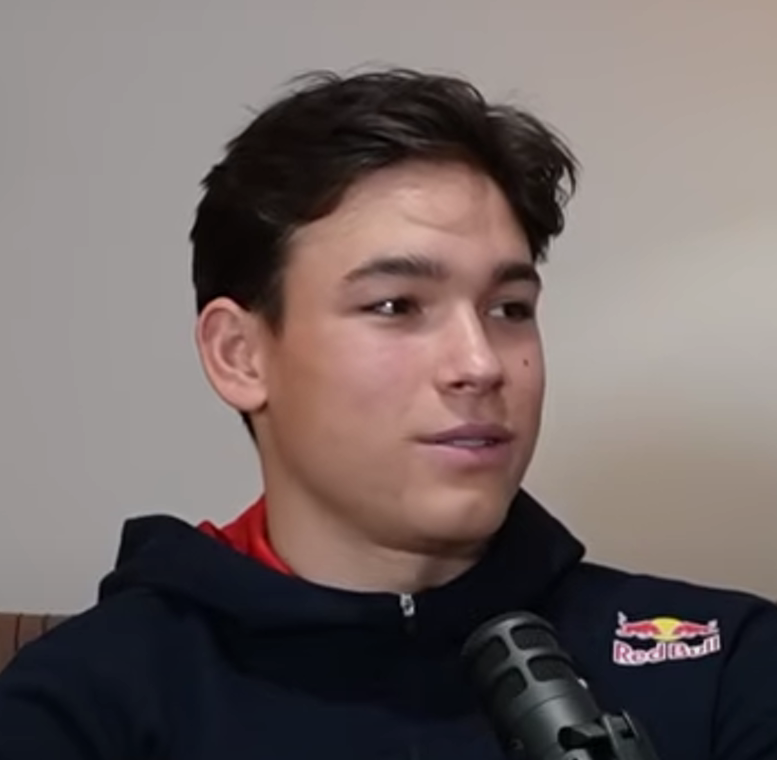
- Edgar Canet

Personal information
- Born: 16 March 2005 (age 21) La Garriga, Vallès Oriental, Catalonia
- Occupation: Motorcycle rider

Sport
- Sport: Motocross; Rally raid
- Club: Red Bull KTM Factory Racing
- Team: Red Bull KTM Factory Racing

Edgar Canet i Ardèvol (born 16 March 2005) is a Spanish motorcycle racer who has competed in both motocross and rally raid disciplines. Since 2024, he has been an official rider for KTM, with whom he made his Dakar Rally debut in the 2025 edition. Canet is the youngest rider ever to participate in the Dakar Rally in the motorcycle category.

== Sporting career ==
=== Early years ===
Son of Albert Canet and grandson of Salvador Ardèvol, former motocross riders (his grandfather also ran a motorcycle workshop in La Garriga, Canet became interested in motorcycling at a very young age. At four, he was given a 50 cc KTM, and at six, in 2011, he debuted in competition in the Catalonia Motocross Championship. Within a few years, he won four Spanish beginner championships and one European championship. From the age of eleven, he was supported by Nani Roma, who became his sporting "mentor." Later, other renowned riders such as Jordi Viladoms, Marc Coma, and Joan Barreda helped and advised him throughout his career. Canet trained at the Heinz Kinigadner motocross school, a former world champion and current KTM sporting director.

In 2019, at the age of 14, Canet won the Spanish MX85 Championship on a KTM. He competed in the European Championship until the end of 2023, when he raced his first rally raid, the 1,000 Dunes of Morocco, achieving an impressive second place. From then on, he focused on rally raid.

=== 2024: Rallys ===
In 2024, at the age of 19, Canet competed in his first full season of rally raid on a KTM 450 Rally Factory for the XRAIDS Experience team. He finished eleventh (third in the Rally2 category) in his debut race, the Rally of Portugal. In the Rally of Morocco, he finished seventh overall. He also participated in the Argentine raid Desafío Ruta 40 and achieved several second and third place stage finishes. That year, he also competed in the Oasis Raid and the Baja Aragón and finished sixth in the FIM Bajas World Cup in the Junior category. Due to these impressive results, KTM signed him as an official rider for the Red Bull KTM Factory team for the 2025 Dakar Rally.

=== 2025: Dakar debut and World Champion ===
In 2025, Canat debuted in the Dakar Rally with KTM's factory team, becoming the youngest rider in the event at just 19 years old. Canet rode a KTM 450 Rally and shared the team with brothers Luciano and Kevin Benavides and Daniel Sanders. His main mentor and support during the race remained Nani Roma.

In the prologue stage, Canet achieved third place overall behind Daniel Sanders (by only 12 seconds) and Ross Branch, after leading the motorcycle category for a significant period. This result placed him as the provisional leader in the Rally2 category. In the seventh stage, on 12 January, he finished second behind Daniel Sanders and ahead of Tosha Schareina. Canet finished the rally in eighth place overall and won the Rally2 category, also being nominated Rookie of the Year.

In October, Canet won the Rally of Morocco and became World Rally-Raid Champion in the Rally2 category.
