= Rallye du Maroc (rally raid) =

Off-road vehicle race

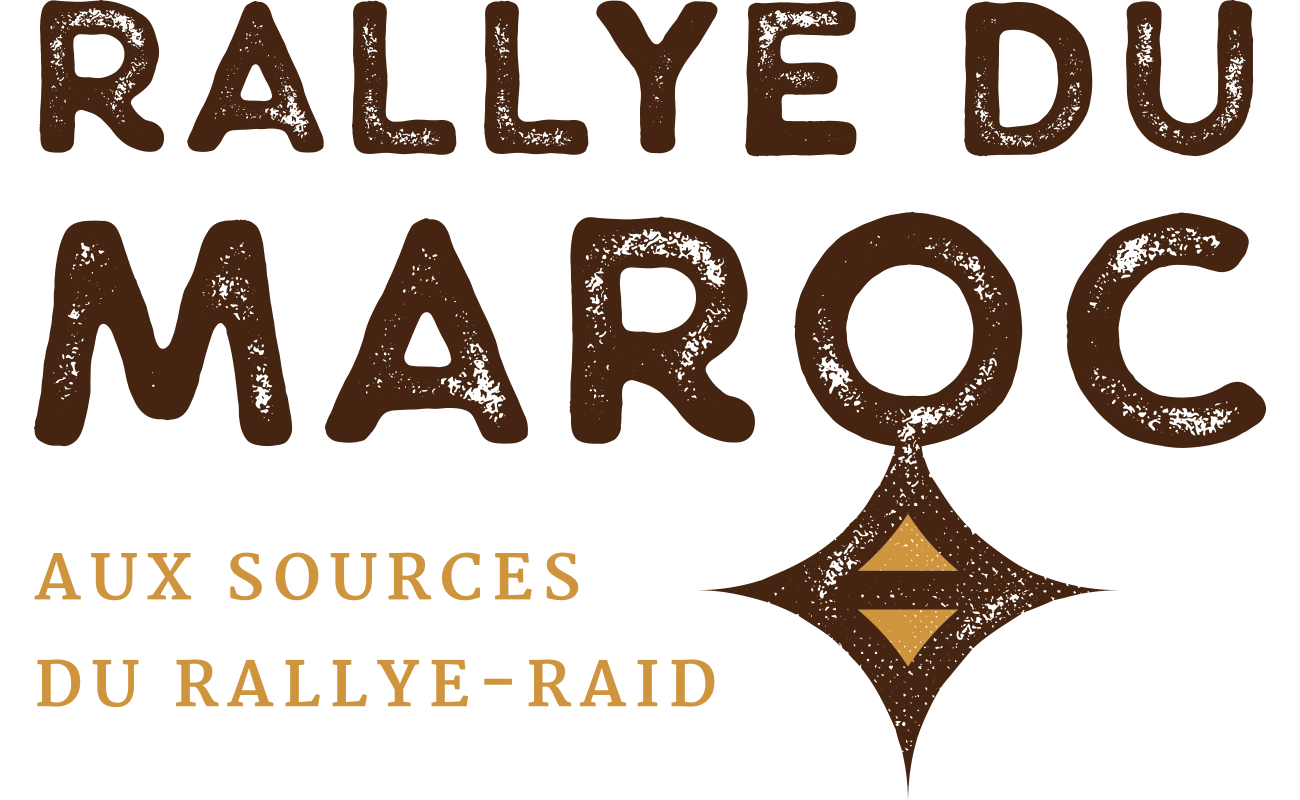
- Region: Morocco
- Inaugural season: 2000
- Official website: rallyemaroc.com

The Rallye du Maroc is a rally-raid which is held each year in Morocco from 2000. The event is part of both the World Rally-Raid Championship co-sanctioned by the FIA and FIM, after previously being overseen separately by the FIA World Cup for Cross-Country Rallies and FIM Cross-Country Rallies World Championship.

In 2017, organization of the Rallye du Maroc was officially ceded to ODC Event, represented by Dakar Rally director David Castera. ODC oversaw the race from 2018 to 2025, after which Pro Dunes Events became the new organizer.

== Winners by edition ==
	Driver	Co-driver	Car	Biker	Bike
2000	(France) Jean-Louis Schlesser	(France) Henri Magne	Buggy Schlesser	(France) Cyril Despres	Honda
2001	(France) Jean-Louis Schlesser	(France) Henri Magne	Buggy Schlesser	(France) Richard Sainct	KTM
2002	(France) Jean-Louis Schlesser	(France) Henri Magne	Buggy Schlesser	(France) Richard Sainct	KTM
2003	(South Africa) Giniel de Villiers	(Sweden) Tina Thörner	Nissan Pickup	(France) Cyril Despres	KTM
2004	(France) Stéphane Peterhansel	(France) Jean-Paul Cottret	Mitsubishi	(Spain) Isidre Esteve Pujol	KTM
2005	(France) Bruno Saby	(France) Michel Périn	Volkswagen	(Spain) Isidre Esteve Pujol	KTM
2006	(South Africa) Giniel de Villiers	(Germany) Dirk von Zitzewitz	Volkswagen	(Spain) Marc Coma	KTM
2007	(South Africa) Giniel de Villiers	(Germany) Dirk von Zitzewitz	Volkswagen	(Portugal) Ruben Faria	KTM
2008	(France) Jean-Louis Schlesser	(France) Arnaud Debron	Buggy Schlesser	(France) David Frétigné	Yamaha
2009	(France) Stéphane Peterhansel	(France) Jean-Paul Cottret	BMW X3 CC	(Spain) Marc Coma	KTM
2010	(France) Stéphane Peterhansel	(France) Jean-Paul Cottret	BMW X3 CC	(France) Cyril Despres	KTM
2011	(Netherlands) Bernhard ten Brinke	(France) Matthieu Baumel	Mitsubishi	(Portugal) Helder Rodrigues	Yamaha
2012	(France) Éric Vigouroux	(France) Alexandre Winocq	Chevrolet	(France) Cyril Despres	KTM
2013	(Argentina) Orlando Terranova	(Portugal) Paulo Fuiza	Mini All 4 Racing	(Portugal) Paulo Gonçalves	Honda
2014	(Qatar) Nasser Al-Attiyah	(France) Matthieu Baumel	Mini All 4 Racing	(Spain) Marc Coma	KTM
2015	(Qatar) Nasser Al-Attiyah	(France) Matthieu Baumel	Mini All 4 Racing	(United Kingdom) Sam Sunderland	KTM
2016	(Qatar) Nasser Al-Attiyah	(France) Matthieu Baumel	Toyota GR DKR Hilux	(Australia) Toby Price	KTM
2017	(Qatar) Nasser Al-Attiyah	(France) Matthieu Baumel	Toyota GR DKR Hilux	(Austria) Matthias Walkner	KTM
2018	(Qatar) Nasser Al-Attiyah	(France) Matthieu Baumel	Toyota GR DKR Hilux	(Australia) Toby Price	KTM
2019	(South Africa) Giniel de Villiers	(Spain) Alex Haro	Toyota GR DKR Hilux	(United States) Andrew Short	Husqvarna
2020	Cancelled due to COVID-19 pandemic			Cancelled due to COVID-19 pandemic	
2021	(Qatar) Nasser Al-Attiyah	(France) Matthieu Baumel	Toyota GR DKR Hilux	(Chile) Pablo Quintanilla	Honda
2022	(France) Guerlain Chicherit	(France) Alex Winocq	Prodrive Hunter T1+	(United States) Skyler Howes	Husqvarna
2023	(Saudi Arabia) Yazeed Al-Rajhi	(Germany) Timo Gottschalk	Toyota GR DKR Hilux	(Australia) Toby Price	KTM
2024	(Qatar) Nasser Al-Attiyah	(France) Édouard Boulanger	Dacia Sandrider	(Australia) Daniel Sanders	KTM
2025	(France) Sébastien Loeb	(France) Édouard Boulanger	Dacia Sandrider	(Spain) Tosha Schareina	Honda
2026	(United States) Seth Quintero	(United States) Andrew Short	Toyota GR DKR Hilux EVO TIU	(Spain) Edgar Canet	KTM

== See also ==
- Rallye du Maroc
