= BP Ultimate Rally-Raid Portugal =

Cross-country rally raid race

BP Ultimate Rally-Raid Portugal is an international rally-raid competition held in Portugal. It is organized by Automóvel Club de Portugal (ACP) and the race is the third leg of the FIA FIM World Rally-Raid Championship 2024 (W2RC) and is a points scoring event.

The inaugural edition was held from 2 to 7 April 2024. It is held in Portugal and Spain and the only European race in the W2RC calendar. Some of the World's top drivers and riders take part in the series.

== Rally route ==
The route includes five stages, known as SS or Selective Sections covering a distance of about 1000km. The event runs for cars, bikes and quads on different terrain like sandy beaches of the Alentejo coast, good roads of the Ribatejo and rocky Spanish Extremadura. After the Prologue in the morning of 3 April 2024, the first stage consisted of 100km.

== List of Winners ==
=== FIA ===
Year	Route	Ultimate		Challenger		SSVs	
Year	Route	Driver & Co-driver	Make & model	Driver & Co-driver	Make & model	Driver & Co-driver	Make & model
2024	Grândola - Badajoz - Grândola	(Qatar) Nasser Al-Attiyah (France) Édouard Boulanger	Toyota Gazoo Racing	(Lithuania) Rokas Baciuška (Spain) Oriol Vidal	Taurus T3 Max	(Portugal) João Monteiro (Portugal) Nuno Morais	Can-Am Maverick X3 X RS Turbo RR
2025	Grândola - Badajoz - Lisbon	(Brazil) Lucas Moraes (Spain) Armand Monleón	Toyota Gazoo Racing	(Portugal) Gonçalo Guerreiro (Argentina) Bruno Jacomy	Taurus T3 Max	(Portugal) João Dias (Portugal) Rui Pita	Polaris RZR Pro R

=== FIM ===
Year	Route	RallyGP		Rally2		Rally3		Quads	
Year	Route	Driver	Make & model	Driver	Make & model	Driver	Make & model	Driver	Make & model
2024	Grândola - Badajoz - Grândola	(Spain) Tosha Schareina	Honda CRF450 Rally	(Portugal) Bruno Santos	Husqvarna 450 Rally	(Portugal) Gonçalo Amaral	Honda CRF450RX	(Poland) Kamil Wiśniewski	Yamaha Raptor 700
2025	Grândola - Badajoz - Lisbon	(Australia) Daniel Sanders	KTM 450 Rally	(Spain) Edgar Canet	KTM 450 Replica	(France) Thomas Zoldos	Beta RR 430	(France) Gaëtan Martinez	Cfmoto CForce 1000 R
