= Abu Dhabi Desert Challenge =

Annual rally race in United Arab Emirates

The Abu Dhabi Desert Challenge is an international rally raid race held in the Emirate of Abu Dhabi of the United Arab Emirates since 1991. The race is points scoring for the World Rally-Raid Championship and is organized by the Automobile & Touring Club of the United Arab Emirates (ATCUAE), headed by the event founder Mohammed bin Sulayem.

Originally for cars only, motorcycles and quads are allowed since 1995 and trucks since 2002.

The event was originally known as the UAE Desert Challenge, since it spanned several emirates of the country. Since 2009, the route includes five stages (plus a Super Special stage) entirely within the Abu Dhabi emirate, and the title changed to the current one.

== Winners ==
=== Cars ===
Year	Driver	Codriver	Car
1991	(United Arab Emirates) Mohammed Mattar	(United Arab Emirates) Hassan Ali Bin Shahdoor	Land Rover Defender
1992	(United Arab Emirates) Mohammed Mattar	(United Arab Emirates) Hassan Ali Bin Shahdoor	Land Rover Defender
1993	(Qatar) Saeed Al-Hajri	(France) Henri Magne	Mitsubishi Pajero
1994	(France) Jean-Louis Schlesser	–	Buggy Schlesser
1995	(France) Jean-Louis Schlesser	–	Buggy Schlesser
1996	(France) Bruno Saby	(France) Dominique Serieys	Mitsubishi Pajero
1997	(Finland) Ari Vatanen	(United Kingdom) Fred Gallagher	Citroën ZX Rally Raid
1998	(France) Jean-Pierre Fontenay	(France) Gilles Picard	Mitsubishi Pajero
1999	(France) Jean-Louis Schlesser	(France) Henri Magne	Buggy Schlesser
2000	(France) Jean-Louis Schlesser	(Belgium) Jean-Marie Lurquin	Buggy Schlesser
2001	(France) Jean-Louis Schlesser	(France) Henri Magne	Buggy Schlesser
2002	(France) Stéphane Peterhansel	(France) Jean-Paul Cottret	Mitsubishi Pajero
2003	(France) Stéphane Peterhansel	(France) Jean-Paul Cottret	Mitsubishi Pajero
2004	(Japan) Hiroshi Masuoka	(Germany) Andreas Schulz	Mitsubishi Pajero
2005	(France) Stéphane Peterhansel	(France) Jean-Paul Cottret	Mitsubishi Evo
2006	(France) Luc Alphand	(France) Gilles Picard	Mitsubishi Evo
2007	(France) Stéphane Peterhansel	(France) Jean-Paul Cottret	Mitsubishi Evo (8)
2008	(Qatar) Nasser Al-Attiyah	(Sweden) Tina Thörner	BMW X3
2009	(France) Guerlain Chicherit	(Sweden) Tina Thörner	BMW X3
2010	(Russia) Leonid Novitskiy	(Germany) Andreas Schulz	BMW X3
2011	(France) Stéphane Peterhansel	(France) Jean-Paul Cottret	Mini All 4 Racing
2012	(France) Jean-Louis Schlesser	(Russia) Konstantin Zhiltsov	Buggy Schlesser
2013	(Spain) Nani Roma	(France) Michel Perin	Mini All 4 Racing
2014	(Russia) Vladimir Vasilyev	(Russia) Konstantin Zhiltsov	Mini All 4 Racing
2015	(Russia) Vladimir Vasilyev	(Russia) Konstantin Zhiltsov	Mini All 4 Racing
2016	(Qatar) Nasser Al-Attiyah	(France) Mathieu Baumel	Toyota Hilux Overdrive
2017	(United Arab Emirates) Sh. Khalid Al Qassimi	(United Arab Emirates) Khalid Al Kendi	Peugeot 3008 DKR
2018	(Czech Republic) Martin Prokop	(Czech Republic) David Pabiška	Ford F-150 Evo
2019	(France) Stéphane Peterhansel	(Germany) Andrea Peterhansel	Mini JCW Rally X-Raid
2020	Not held		
2021	(Qatar) Nasser Al-Attiyah	(France) Mathieu Baumel	Toyota Hilux Dakar
2022	(France) Stéphane Peterhansel	(Switzerland) Edouard Boulanger	Audi RS Q e-tron
2023	(Saudi Arabia) Yazeed Al-Rajhi	(Germany) Timo Gottschalk	Toyota GR DKR Hilux
2024	(Qatar) Nasser Al-Attiyah	(France) Edouard Boulanger	Prodrive Hunter T1+
2025	(Qatar) Nasser Al-Attiyah	(France) Edouard Boulanger	Dacia Sandrider

=== Motorcycles ===
Year	Rider	Motorcycle
1995	(Austria) Heinz Kinigadner	KTM LC4
1996	(France) Stéphane Peterhansel	Yamaha M3
1997	(Spain) Jordi Arcarons	KTM 660
1998	(Austria) Heinz Kinigadner	KTM LC4 660
1999	(Italy) Fabrizio Meoni	KTM 660
2000	(United States) Jimmy Lewis	BMW 900 RR
2001	(France) Cyril Despres	KTM 660
2002	(France) Cyril Despres	KTM 660
2003	(France) Cyril Despres	KTM 660
2004	(Spain) Isidre Esteve	KTM 660
2005	(France) Cyril Despres	KTM 660
2006	(Spain) Marc Coma	KTM 660
2007	(Spain) Marc Coma	KTM 660
2008	(France) Cyril Despres	KTM 690
2009	(Spain) Marc Coma	KTM 690
2010	(Spain) Marc Coma	KTM 690 Rally
2011	(Spain) Marc Coma	KTM 450 Rally
2012	(Spain) Marc Coma	KTM 450 Rally
2013	(Spain) Marc Coma	KTM 450 Rally
2014	(Portugal) Paulo Gonçalves	Honda
2015	(Spain) Marc Coma	KTM 450 Rally
2016	(Australia) Toby Price	KTM 450 Rally
2017	(United Kingdom) Sam Sunderland	KTM 450 Rally
2018	(Chile) Pablo Quintanilla	Husqvarna 450 Rally
2019	(United Kingdom) Sam Sunderland	KTM 450 Rally
2020	Not held	
2021	(Austria) Matthias Walkner	KTM 450 Rally
2022	(United Kingdom) Sam Sunderland	Gas Gas 450 Rally Factory Replica
2023	(France) Adrien Van Beveren	Honda CRF 450 Rally
2024	(South Africa) Aaron Marè	Hero 450 Rally
2025	(Australia) Daniel Sanders	KTM 450 Rally Factory
