= Toyota Hilux Dakar =

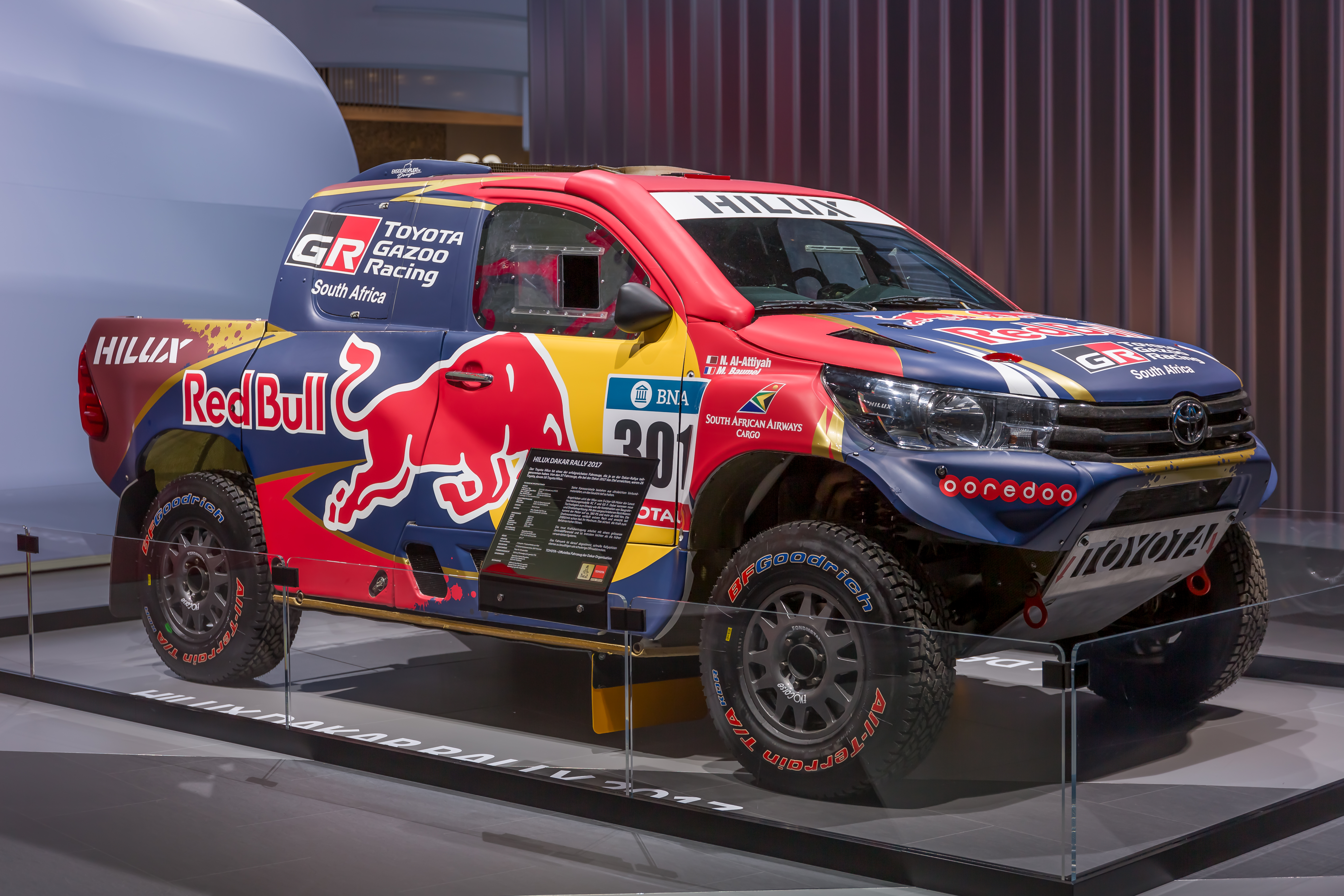

Overview
- Manufacturer: Toyota
- Also called: Toyota GR DKR Hilux
- Production: 2012–present

Body and chassis
- Class: Rally raid
- Layout: Four-wheel drive

Powertrain
- Engine: Petrol: 5.0 L 2UR V8 (2012–2021); 3.4 L V35A twin-turbo V6 (2022–present)

Dimensions
- Wheelbase: 3,085 mm (121.5 in)
- Length: 5,255 mm (206.9 in)
- Width: 1,935 mm (76.2 in)
- Height: 1,810 mm (71.3 in)
- Curb weight: 1,850 kg (4,078.6 lb)

The Toyota Hilux Dakar is an off-road competition car based on the Hilux. It has won the FIA World Cup for Cross-Country Rallies in 2016, 2017 and 2021, the Dakar Rally in 2019, 2022, 2023 and 2025, and the World Rally-Raid Championship in 2022 and 2023.

Since 2016, Toyota Gazoo Racing and its regional subsidiaries field the Toyota GR DKR Hilux model, which is produced by SVR Hallspeed in South Africa; prior to that, the car was mainly used by private installations Imperial and Overdrive Racing. TGR's international rally division introduced an upgraded Hilux, the Toyota GR DKR Hilux EVO T1U, in 2024. Overdrive Racing prepares its own model separate from TGR dubbed the Toyota Hilux Overdrive. A Hilux developed by WCT Engineering, intended to be affordable for privateers, has been raced since 2023.

== Competition history ==
=== Dakar victories ===
Year	Driver	Co-driver
2019	(Qatar) Nasser Al-Attiyah	(France) Mathieu Baumel
2022	(Qatar) Nasser Al-Attiyah	(France) Mathieu Baumel
2023	(Qatar) Nasser Al-Attiyah	(France) Mathieu Baumel
2025	(Saudi Arabia) Yazeed Al-Rajhi	(Germany) Timo Gottschalk

=== FIA World Cup for Cross-Country Rallies ===
Year	Driver	Co-driver
2016	(Qatar) Nasser Al-Attiyah	(France) Mathieu Baumel
2017	(Qatar) Nasser Al-Attiyah	(France) Mathieu Baumel
2021	(Qatar) Nasser Al-Attiyah	(France) Mathieu Baumel

=== World Rally-Raid Championship ===
Year	Driver	Co-driver
2022	(Qatar) Nasser Al-Attiyah	(France) Mathieu Baumel
2023	(Qatar) Nasser Al-Attiyah	(France) Mathieu Baumel
2025	(Brazil) Lucas Moraes	

== See also ==
- Toyota Gazoo Racing
- Toyota Hilux
