= 2025 World Rally-Raid Championship =

Rally raid competition season

2025 World Rally-Raid Championship
Previous:	2024	Next:	2026

The 2025 World Rally-Raid Championship was the fourth season of the annual competition for rally raid events sanctioned by both the FIA and FIM. The Amaury Sport Organization was in the fourth of a five-year contract to promote the championship. The season started with the 2025 Dakar Rally, which was won in cars by Yazeed Al-Rajhi and Timo Gottschalk and by Daniel Sanders on bikes.

== Calendar ==
The calendar for the 2025 season featured five rally-raid events. Like in the previous seasons, the Dakar Rally once again hosted the opening event, while the South Africa Safari Rally was added to the calendar, replacing Desafío Ruta 40.

Round	Dates	Rally name	Format
1	3–17 January	(Saudi Arabia) Dakar Rally	Marathon
2	21–27 February	(United Arab Emirates) Abu Dhabi Desert Challenge	Rally
3	18–24 May	South Africa Safari Rally	Rally
4	22–28 September	BP Ultimate Rally-Raid Portugal	Rally
5	10–17 October	(Morocco) Rallye du Maroc	Rally

== FIA World Rally-Raid Championship ==
- Entrants competing in the Ultimate, Challenger, and SSV classes are eligible for the overall World Championship.

=== Entry list ===
Ultimate Teams & Drivers
Constructor	Vehicle	Team	Driver	Co-driver	Rounds
Century	CR7	(South Africa) Century Racing Factory Team	(France) Mathieu Serradori	(France) Loïc Minaudier	1, 3, 5
Dacia	Dacia Sandrider	(France) The Dacia Sandriders	(Qatar) Nasser Al-Attiyah	(France) Édouard Boulanger	1–3
Dacia	Dacia Sandrider	(France) The Dacia Sandriders	(Qatar) Nasser Al-Attiyah	(Belgium) Fabian Lurquin	4–5
Dacia	Dacia Sandrider	(France) The Dacia Sandriders	(Spain) Cristina Gutiérrez	(Spain) Pablo Moreno	1, 4–5
Dacia	Dacia Sandrider	(France) The Dacia Sandriders	(France) Sébastien Loeb	(Belgium) Fabian Lurquin	1–3
Dacia	Dacia Sandrider	(France) The Dacia Sandriders	(France) Sébastien Loeb	(France) Édouard Boulanger	4–5
Ford	Ford Raptor DKR	(United Kingdom) Ford M-Sport	(Sweden) Mattias Ekström	(Sweden) Emil Bergkvist	1–2, 5
Ford	Ford Raptor DKR	(United Kingdom) Ford M-Sport	(United States) Mitchell Guthrie	(United States) Kellon Walch	1–2, 5
Ford	Ford Raptor DKR	(United Kingdom) Ford M-Sport	(Spain) Nani Roma	(Spain) Alex Haro	1, 3, 5
Ford	Ford Raptor DKR	(United Kingdom) Ford M-Sport	(Spain) Carlos Sainz Sr.	(Spain) Lucas Cruz	1, 3–5
Ford	Ford Raptor DKR	(Czech Republic) Orlen Jipocar Team	(Czech Republic) Martin Prokop	(Czech Republic) Viktor Chytka	5
Ford	Ford Raptor	(Czech Republic) Orlen Jipocar Team	(Czech Republic) Martin Prokop	(Czech Republic) Viktor Chytka	1–3
MD	Optimus	(France) JLC Racing	(France) Jean-Luc Ceccaldi	(France) Delphine Delfino	1
MD	Optimus	(France) JLC Racing	(France) Jean-Luc Ceccaldi	(France) Guilhem Alves	5
Mini	JCW Rally 3.0d	(Germany) X-raid Mini JCW Team	(Portugal) João Ferreira	(Portugal) Filipe Palmeiro	1–3
Mini	JCW Rally 3.0d	(Germany) X-raid Mini JCW Team	(Belgium) Guillaume De Mévius	(France) Mathieu Baumel	1
Mini	JCW Rally 3.0d	(Germany) X-raid Mini JCW Team	(Belgium) Guillaume De Mévius	(France) Xavier Panseri	2–3
Mini	JCW Rally 3.0d	(Germany) X-raid Mini JCW Team	(Kyrgyzstan) Denis Krotov	Konstantin Zhiltsov	1, 4
Mini	JCW Rally 3.0d	(Germany) X-raid Mini JCW Team	(France) Lionel Baud	(France) Lucie Baud	1, 4–5
Red-Lined	Revo T1+	(Netherlands) Daklapack Rallysport	(Netherlands) Dave Klaassen	(Netherlands) Tessa Klaassen	1, 3
Toyota	Hilux Overdrive	(Belgium) Overdrive Racing	(Saudi Arabia) Yazeed Al-Rajhi	(Germany) Timo Gottschalk	1–2, 4–5
Toyota	Hilux Overdrive	(Belgium) Overdrive Racing	(Argentina) Juan Cruz Yacopini	(Spain) Daniel Oliveras	All
Toyota	Hilux Overdrive	(Belgium) Overdrive Racing	(Lithuania) Rokas Baciuška	(Spain) Oriol Mena	1
Toyota	Hilux Overdrive	(Belgium) Overdrive Racing	(Poland) Eryk Goczał	(Spain) Oriol Mena	2
Toyota	Hilux Overdrive	(Belgium) Overdrive Racing	(Poland) Marek Goczał	(Poland) Maciej Marton	2
Toyota	Hilux Overdrive	(Belgium) Overdrive Racing	(Kyrgyzstan) Denis Krotov	Konstantin Zhiltsov	2–3
Toyota	GR DKR Hilux	(Japan) Toyota Gazoo Racing	(United States) Seth Quintero	(Germany) Dennis Zenz	1–3
Toyota	GR DKR Hilux	(Japan) Toyota Gazoo Racing	(United States) Seth Quintero	(United States) Andrew Short	4–5
Toyota	GR DKR Hilux	(Japan) Toyota Gazoo Racing	(Brazil) Lucas Moraes	(Spain) Armand Monleon	All
Toyota	GR DKR Hilux	(Japan) Toyota Gazoo Racing	(South Africa) Guy Botterill	(South Africa) Dennis Murphy	3
Toyota	GR DKR Hilux	(Japan) Toyota Gazoo Racing	(South Africa) Saood Variawa	(France) François Cazalet	3–5
Toyota	GR DKR Hilux	(Japan) Toyota Gazoo Racing	(Portugal) João Ferreira	(Portugal) Filipe Palmeiro	4–5
Toyota	GR DKR Hilux	(Japan) Toyota Gazoo Racing	(South Africa) Henk Lategan	(South Africa) Brett Cummings	3–5
Toyota	Hilux	(South Africa) Imt Evo Toyota Gazoo Racing	(South Africa) Henk Lategan	(South Africa) Brett Cummings	1
Toyota	Hilux	(South Africa) Imt Evo Toyota Gazoo Racing	(South Africa) Saood Variawa	(France) François Cazalet	1–2
Toyota	Hilux	(China) Mintimes Yunxiang Rally Team	(China) Guoyu Zhang	(China) Yicheng Wang	1
Toyota	Hilux IMT Evo	(Poland) Energylandia Rally Team	(Poland) Eryk Goczał	(Poland) Szymon Gospodarczyk	4–5
Toyota	Hilux IMT Evo	(Poland) Energylandia Rally Team	(Poland) Michał Goczał	(Spain) Diego Ortega	4–5
Toyota	Hilux IMT Evo	(Poland) Energylandia Rally Team	(Poland) Marek Goczał	(Poland) Maciej Marton	4–5
Volkswagen	Wct Amarok	(Germany) PS Laser Racing	(Germany) Daniel Schröder	(South Africa) Henry Carl Köhne	All
Challenger Teams & Drivers
Constructor	Vehicle	Team	Driver	Co-driver	Rounds
Can-Am	Maverick X3 X RS		(Sweden) Mattias Ekström	(Sweden) Emil Bergkvist	4
GRallyTeam	OT3	(Belgium) G Rally Team	(Netherlands) Puck Klaassen	(South Africa) Charan Moore	1–3
GRallyTeam	OT3	(Belgium) G Rally Team	(Netherlands) Puck Klaassen	(Argentina) Augusto Sanz	5
GRallyTeam	OT3	(Belgium) G Rally Team	(Portugal) Rui Carneiro	(Norway) Ola Fløene	1
GRallyTeam	OT3	(Belgium) G Rally Team	(Portugal) Rui Carneiro	(Portugal) David Megre	5
MMP	Rally Raid	(France) Race World Team - MMP	(Saudi Arabia) Yasir Seaidan	(France) Michaël Metge	5
Taurus	T3 Max	(France) Team BBR	(Argentina) Nicolás Cavigliasso	(Argentina) Valentina Pertegarini	All
Taurus	T3 Max	(France) Team BBR	(Spain) Pau Navarro	(Argentina) Lisandro Sisterna	1
Taurus	T3 Max	(France) Team BBR	(Spain) Pau Navarro	(Spain) Jan Rosa i Vinas	2–5
Taurus	T3 Max	(France) Team BBR	(Saudi Arabia) Yasir Seaidan	(France) Michaël Metge	1–2
Taurus	T3 Max	(France) Team BBR	(Saudi Arabia) Dania Akeel	(France) Stéphane Duple	1–3
Taurus	T3 Max	(France) Team BBR	(Saudi Arabia) Dania Akeel	(Brazil) Cadu Sachs	4–5
Taurus	T3 Max	(France) Team BBR	(Argentina) David Zille	(Argentina) Sebastian Cesana	3
Taurus	T3 Max	(France) Team BBR	(Portugal) Pedro Gonçalves	(Portugal) Rui Franco	4
Taurus	T3 Max	(France) Team BBR	(Portugal) Pedro Gonçalves	(Portugal) Hugo Magalhães	5
Taurus	T3 Max	(United States) Red Bull Off-road Jr Team USA by BFG	(United States) Corbin Leaverton	(Germany) Taye Perry	1
Taurus	T3 Max	(United States) Red Bull Off-road Jr Team USA by BFG	(Portugal) Gonçalo Guerreiro	(Brazil) Cadu Sachs	1
Taurus	T3 Max	(Qatar) Nasser Racing	(Portugal) Gonçalo Guerreiro	(Argentina) Bruno Jacomy	4
Taurus	T3 Max	(Qatar) Nasser Racing	(Qatar) Abdulaziz Al-Kuwari	(Qatar) Nasser Al-Kuwari	1
Taurus	T3 Max	(Qatar) Nasser Racing	(Qatar) Abdulaziz Al-Kuwari	(France) Stéphane Duplé	5
Taurus	T3 Max	(Qatar) Nasser Racing	(Qatar) Khalifa Al-Attiyah	(Argentina) Bruno Jacomy	1–3
Taurus	T3 Max	(Qatar) Nasser Racing	(Qatar) Khalifa Al-Attiyah	(France) Max Delfino	5
Taurus	T3 Max	(Qatar) Nasser Racing	(Spain) Eduard Pons	(Spain) Jaume Betriu	1–2
Taurus	T3 Max	(Poland) Akpol Recykling	(Poland) Adam Kus	(Ukraine) Dmytro Tsyro	1–4
Taurus	T3 Max	(Netherlands) Daklapack Rallysport	(Argentina) David Zille	(Argentina) Sebastian Cesana	1
Taurus	T3 Max	(Netherlands) Daklapack Rallysport	(Netherlands) Pim Klaassen	(Netherlands) Mark Laan	4
Taurus	T3 Max	(United Arab Emirates) Aljafla Racing	(United Arab Emirates) Khalid Aljafla	Andrei Rudnitski	1–2
X-raid	YXZ 100R	(Portugal) Franco Sport	(Portugal) Mário Franco	(Portugal) Rui Franco	1
X-raid	YXZ 100R	(Portugal) Franco Sport	(Portugal) Mário Franco	(Portugal) João Miranda	2
X-raid	YXZ 100R	(Portugal) Franco Sport	(Portugal) Pedro Gonçalves	(Portugal) Hugo Magalhães	1–2
SSV Teams & Drivers
Constructor	Vehicle	Team	Driver	Co-driver	Rounds
BRP Can-Am	Maverick R	(Germany) Can-Am Factory Team	(United States) Sara Price	(United States) Sean Berriman	1
BRP Can-Am	Maverick R	(Germany) South Racing Can-Am	(Argentina) Manuel Andújar	(Argentina) Bernardo Graue	1
BRP Can-Am	Maverick R	(Germany) South Racing Can-Am	(Argentina) Manuel Andújar	(Argentina) Andrés Frini	5
BRP Can-Am	Maverick R	(Germany) South Racing Can-Am	(Spain) Fernando Álvarez	(France) Xavier Panseri	1
BRP Can-Am	Maverick R	(Germany) South Racing Can-Am	(Argentina) Diego Martínez	(Uruguay) Sergio Lafuente	1
BRP Can-Am	Maverick R	(United Arab Emirates) Liwa Team UAE	(United Arab Emirates) Mansour Al-Helei	(United Arab Emirates) Khalid Alkendi	2
BRP Can-Am	Maverick R	(Portugal) Franco Sport	(Portugal) Mário Franco	(Portugal) João Miranda	3
BRP Can-Am	Maverick XRS Turbo RR	(Portugal) Old Friends Rally Team	(Portugal) Alexandre Pinto	(Portugal) Bernardo Oliveira	1–3
BRP Can-Am	Maverick XRS Turbo RR	(Portugal) Old Friends Rally Team	(Spain) Carlos Vento	(Portugal) Jorge Brandão	1
BRP Can-Am	Maverick XRS Turbo RR	(Portugal) Old Friends Rally Team	(Italy) Enrico Gaspari	(Portugal) Fausto Mota	4
BRP Can-Am	Maverick XRS Turbo RR	(Netherlands) Team RaceArt	(Netherlands) Roger Grouwels	(Netherlands) Rudolf Meijer	1
BRP Can-Am	Maverick XRS Turbo RR	(France) MMP	(France) Claude Fournier	(France) Gregory Revest-Arnoux	1
BRP Can-Am	Maverick XRS Turbo RR	(France) MMP	(France) Claude Fournier	(France) Patrick Jimbert	2–3
BRP Can-Am	Maverick XRS Turbo RR	(France) MMP	(Italy) Enrico Gaspari	(France) Antoine Lecourbe	2
BRP Can-Am	Maverick XRS Turbo RR	(France) MMP	(Italy) Enrico Gaspari	(Portugal) Fausto Mota	3
Polaris	RZR PRO R Sport	(Spain) TH-Trucks Team	(Italy) Enrico Gaspari	(Portugal) Fausto Mota	1
Polaris	RZR PRO R Sport	(Italy) CST Xtreme Plus Polaris Team	(Italy) Michele Cinotto	(Italy) Alberto Bertoldi	1
Polaris	RZR PRO R Sport	(Italy) CST Xtreme Plus Polaris Team	(Italy) Michele Cinotto	(Italy) Maurizio Dominella	2–3
Polaris	RZR PRO R Sport	(Portugal) Old Friends Rally Team	(Portugal) Alexandre Pinto	(Portugal) Bernardo Oliveira	4–5

=== Scoring system ===
Points are awarded to every W2RC-listed entrant, regardless of whether they finish the event or not. Stage points are awarded for the top five finishers of every stage whose special section exceeds 100km. In a Power Selective Section, only the top three receive points.

Rally points

Position	1st	2nd	3rd	4th	5th	6th	7th	8th	9th	10th	11th	12th	13th	14th	15th	16th+	Retired
Points	30	25	20	17	15	13	11	9	8	7	6	5	4	3	2	2	1

Marathon points

Position	1st	2nd	3rd	4th	5th	6th	7th	8th	9th	10th	11th	12th	13th	14th	15th	16th+	Retired
Points	50	40	30	26	23	20	17	15	13	11	9	7	6	5	4	4	2

Stage points

Position	1st	2nd	3rd	4th	5th
Points	5	4	3	2	1

Power Selective Section points

Position	1st	2nd	3rd
Points	3	2	1

=== World Drivers' & Co-Drivers' championships ===
The driver/co-driver who records a points-scoring classification would be taken into account for the championship regardless of the categories.

Pos.	Driver	Class	DAK (Saudi Arabia)	ABU (United Arab Emirates)	ZAF (South Africa)	PRT (Portugal)	MOR (Morocco)	Points
1	(Brazil) Lucas Moraes	Ultimate	15^{6+12}	2^{25+20}	3^{20+6}	1^{30+11}	2^{25+9}	164
2	(Qatar) Nasser Al-Attiyah	Ultimate	4^{26+22}	1^{30+18}	10^{8+10}	5^{17+9}	15^{3+9}	152
3	(South Africa) Henk Lategan	Ultimate	2^{40+15}	WD	1^{30+9}	2^{25+12}	13^{4+7}	142
4	(France) Sébastien Loeb	Ultimate	DSQ	Ret^{1+9}	2^{25+5}	3^{20+11}	1^{30+12}	113
5	(United States) Seth Quintero	Ultimate	9^{13+15}	3^{20+12}	6^{15+4}	Ret^{1+4}	58^{2+9+2}	97
6	(Saudi Arabia) Yazeed Al-Rajhi	Ultimate	1^{50+20}	28^{2+1}		46^{2+2}	Ret^{1}	78
7	(Portugal) João Ferreira	Ultimate	8^{15+7}	7^{13+4}	Ret^{1}	39^{2+13}	4^{17+5+1}	78
8	(Sweden) Mattias Ekström	Ultimate	3^{30+14}	Ret^{1}		Ret^{1}	5^{15+9}	70
9	(Spain) Nani Roma	Ultimate	106^{4+8}		7^{13+2}		3^{20+12+3}	62
10	(Argentina) Juan Cruz Yacopini	Ultimate	7^{17+6}	4^{17+2}	14^{4}	35^{2}	12^{5+2}	55
11	(United States) Mitchell Guthrie	Ultimate	5^{23+5}	5^{15+1}			7^{11}	55
12	(South Africa) Saood Variawa	Ultimate	29^{4+9}	31^{2+2}	12^{6+9}	27^{2+5}	6^{13}	52
13	(Spain) Carlos Sainz Sr.	Ultimate	Ret^{2}		5^{17+9}	37^{2+7}	Ret^{1}	38
14	(France) Mathieu Serradori	Ultimate	6^{20+5}		46^{2+5}		55^{2+1}	35
15	(Belgium) Guillaume De Mévius	Ultimate	23^{4+12}	29^{2}	9^{9+4}			31
16	(Czech Republic) Martin Prokop	Ultimate	11^{11+4}	20^{3}	11^{7}		11^{6}	31
17	(Saudi Arabia) Dania Akeel	Challenger	111^{4+3}	8^{11}	22^{2}	14^{8}	56^{2}	30
18	(Spain) Cristina Gutiérrez	Ultimate	91^{4+2}			8^{13+1}	9^{8}	28
19	(Germany) Daniel Schröder	Ultimate	124^{4+1}	Ret^{1}	8^{11+3}	34^{2}	Ret^{1}	23
20	(Spain) Pau Navarro	Challenger	18^{4+2}	9^{9}	24^{2}	24^{3}	18^{2}	22
21	(Portugal) Gonçalo Guerreiro	Ultimate	16^{5}			6^{15}		20
22	(Poland) Marek Goczał	Ultimate		Ret^{1}		9^{11}	10^{7}	19
23	(Poland) Eryk Goczał	Ultimate		27^{2+6}		44^{2}	8^{9}	19
24	(Argentina) Nicolás Cavigliasso	Challenger	11^{7}	30^{2}	16^{2}	16^{6}	19^{2}	19
25	(Lithuania) Rokas Baciuška	Ultimate	12^{9+7}	WD				16
26	(Saudi Arabia) Yasir Seaidan	Challenger	102^{4}	12^{8}			65^{2}	14
27	(Poland) Adam Kus	Challenger	36^{4}	13^{7}	20^{2}	Ret^{1}		14
28	(Portugal) Alexandre Pinto	SSV	31^{4}	24^{2}	38^{2}	17^{5}	Ret^{1}	14
29	(South Africa) Guy Botterill	Ultimate			13^{5+9}			14
30	(France) Lionel Baud	Ultimate	22^{4}			15^{7}	17^{2}	13
31	(Italy) Enrico Gaspari	SSV	49^{4}	19^{4}	42^{2}	49^{2}		12
32	(Kyrgyzstan) Denis Krotov	Ultimate	121^{4+2}	33^{2}	44^{2}	Ret^{1}		11
33	(Netherlands) Puck Klaassen	Challenger	90^{4}	38^{2}	26^{2}		21^{2}	10
34	(Netherlands) Pim Klaassen	Challenger				12^{9}		9
35	(Portugal) Pedro Gonçalves	Challenger	Ret^{2}	Ret^{1}		21^{4}	28^{2}	9
36	(Spain) Eduard Pons	Challenger	Ret^{2}	16^{6}				8
37	(Italy) Michele Cinotto	SSV	105^{4}	23^{2}	34^{2}			8
38	(Qatar) Khalifa Al-Attiya	Challenger	64^{4}	Ret^{1}	21^{2}		Ret^{1}	8
39	(France) Claude Fournier	SSV	75^{4}	25^{2}	40^{2}			8
40	(United Arab Emirates) Khalid Aljafla	Challenger	Ret^{2}	17^{5}				7
41	(Portugal) Mário Franco	Challenger	73^{4}	Ret^{1}	29^{2}			7
42	(Qatar) Abdulaziz Al-Kuwari	Challenger	27^{4}				59^{2}	6
43	(France) Jean-Luc Ceccaldi	Ultimate	94^{4}				49^{2}	6
44	(Netherlands) Dave Klaassen	Ultimate	119^{4}		32^{2}			6
45	(Argentina) Manuel Andújar	SSV	120^{4}				40^{2}	6
46	(Argentina) David Zille	Challenger	Ret^{2}		15^{3}			5
47	(Poland) Michał Goczał	Ultimate				32^{2}	16^{2}	4
48	(China) Guoyu Zhang	Ultimate	33^{4}					4
49	(Netherlands) Roger Grouwels	SSV	60^{4}					4
50	(United States) Corbin Leaverton	Challenger	93^{4}					4
51	(United States) Sara Price	SSV	118^{4}					4
52	(Portugal) Rui Carneiro	Challenger	Ret^{2}				Ret^{1}	3
53	(Spain) Fernando Álvarez	SSV	Ret^{2}					2
54	(Spain) Carlos Vento	SSV	Ret^{2}					2
55	(Argentina) Diego Martínez	SSV	Ret^{2}					2
56	(United Arab Emirates) Mansour Al-Helei	SSV		34^{2}				2
Drivers ineligible for championship points
	(South Africa) Gareth Woolridge	Ultimate			4			
	(Brazil) Cristian Baumgart	Ultimate				4		
	(South Africa) Guy David Botterill	Ultimate	Ret	6				
	(Portugal) Francisco Barreto	Ultimate				7		
	(South Africa) Brian Baragwanath	Ultimate	10		Ret		14	
	(Brazil) Marcos Baumgart	Challenger		10	Ret	40	27	
	(Greece) Jourdan Serderidis	Ultimate				13	48	
	(Estonia) Urvo Männama	Ultimate	13					
	(Czech Republic) Miroslav Zapletal	Ultimate		14				
	(Chile) Hernan Garces	Ultimate		15	19	20	38	
	(South Africa) Fouche Blignaut	Ultimate			17			
	(South Africa) Giniel de Villiers	Ultimate	Ret		18			
	(Spain) Laia Sanz	Ultimate	Ret				20	
	(Brazil) Marcelo Tiglia Gastaldi	Ultimate	20					
	(France) Pierre Lachaume	Ultimate	21					
	(Spain) Daniel Alonso	Ultimate				22		
	(Germany) Jürgen Schröder	Ultimate			23			
	(Japan) Akira Miura	Ultimate	83		25	Ret		
	(Portugal) José Rogeira	Ultimate				25		
	(Spain) Isidre Esteve	Ultimate	32			36	26	
	(South Africa) Danie Ludick	Ultimate			27			
	(Netherlands) Rik Van Den Brink	Ultimate	56		28	28	Ret	
	(Spain) Ferrán Jubany	Ultimate	28				37	
	(Germany) Markus Walcher	Ultimate	Ret			29		
	(Brazil) Marcos Moraes	Ultimate	30					
	(South Africa) Gerhardt Heinlein	Ultimate			30			
	(Netherlands) Johan Senders	Ultimate				30		
	(South Africa) Nickus Heinlein	Ultimate			31			
	(Belgium) Thijs Vincent	Ultimate				31		
	(Netherlands) Roger Grouwels	Ultimate					31	
	(Netherlands) Richard Timmerman	Ultimate				33		
	(France) Benoît Fretin	Ultimate			Ret		34	
	(Netherlands) Ronald Van Loon	Ultimate	35					
	(Chile) Lucas Del Rio	Ultimate					35	
	(Australia) Jan Kraaij	Ultimate			36			
	(Egypt) Ahmed El Shamy	Ultimate		37				
	(France) Hugues Moilet	Ultimate	38					
	(Brazil) Adroaldo Weisheimer	Ultimate				38		
	(Poland) Tomasz Baranowski	Ultimate					39	
	(Netherlands) Maik Willems	Ultimate	61				41	
	(Lithuania) Gintas Petrus	Ultimate	41					
	(Czech Republic) Karel Trneny	Ultimate	44					
	(Seychelles) Aliyyah Koloc	Ultimate	45					
	(Netherlands) Rients Hofstra	Ultimate			45			
	(France) Simon Vitse	Ultimate	46					
	(Austria) Mark Mustermann	Ultimate				Ret	47	
	(France) Jean Remy Bergounhe	Ultimate	47					
	(South Africa) Jayden Els	Ultimate			47			
	(France) Pascal Thomasse	Ultimate	48					
	(South Africa) Johan van Staden	Ultimate			48			
	(France) Francis Balocchi	Ultimate	51					
	(France) Ludovic Gherardi	Ultimate	52					
	(Netherlands) Janus van Kasteren	Ultimate					61	
	(Netherlands) Michael van Eikeren	Ultimate					63	
	(Czech Republic) Tomáš Ouředníček	Ultimate					66	
	(France) Jerome Cambier	Ultimate	70					
	(Netherlands) Michiel Becx	Ultimate					70	
	(Zimbabwe) William Battershill	Ultimate	71					
	(Belgium) Stefan Carmans	Ultimate	78					
	(China) Min Lei Wang	Ultimate	86					
	(France) Ronald Basso	Ultimate	108					
	(Netherlands) Tim Coronel	Ultimate	110					
	(Lithuania) Vladas Jurkevičius	Ultimate	136					
	Andrei Halabarodzka	Ultimate	Ret					
	(France) Christian Lavieille	Ultimate	Ret					
	(France) Guerlain Chicherit	Ultimate	Ret					
	(China) Wei Han	Ultimate	Ret					
	(Australia) Toby Price	Ultimate	Ret					
	(Italy) Agostino Rizzardi	Ultimate	Ret					
	(South Africa) Mark Corbett	Ultimate	Ret					
	(Lithuania) Benediktas Vanagas	Ultimate	Ret					
	(China) Po Tian	Ultimate	Ret					
	(Italy) Eugenio Amos	Ultimate	Ret					
	(South Africa) Philip Botha	Ultimate			Ret			
	(South Africa) Johan de Bruyn	Ultimate			Ret			
	(United Kingdom) Justin Birchall	Ultimate				Ret		
	(Netherlands) Bert Mourik	Ultimate				Ret		
	(Italy) Francesco Dracone	Ultimate					Ret	
	(Canada) Nathan Hayashi	Ultimate					Ret	
	(France) Jérémie Renou	Ultimate					Ret	
	(France) Frédéric Chesneau	Ultimate					Ret	
Pos.	Driver	Class	DAK (Saudi Arabia)	ABU (United Arab Emirates)	ZAF (South Africa)	PRT (Portugal)	MOR (Morocco)	Points

Pos.	Co-Driver	Class	DAK (Saudi Arabia)	ABU (United Arab Emirates)	ZAF (South Africa)	PRT (Portugal)	MOR (Morocco)	Points
1	(France) Édouard Boulanger	Ultimate	4^{26+22}	1^{30+18}	10^{8+10}	5^{17+9}	1^{30+12}	187
2	(Spain) Armand Monleon	Ultimate	15^{6+12}	2^{25+20}	3^{20+6}	1^{30+11}	2^{25+9}	164
3	(South Africa) Brett Cummings	Ultimate	2^{40+15}	WD	1^{30+9}	2^{25+12}	13^{4+7}	142
4	(Germany) Dennis Zenz	Ultimate	9^{13+15}	3^{20+12}	6^{15+4}			79
5	(Germany) Timo Gottschalk	Ultimate	1^{50+20}	28^{2+1}		46^{2+2}	Ret^{1}	78
6	(Belgium) Fabian Lurquin	Ultimate	DSQ	Ret^{1+9}	2^{25+5}	3^{20+11}	15^{3+9}	78
7	(Portugal) Filipe Palmeiro	Ultimate	8^{15+7}	7^{13+4}	Ret^{1}	39^{2+13}	4^{17+5+1}	78
8	(Sweden) Emil Bergkvist	Ultimate	3^{30+14}	Ret^{1}		Ret^{1}	5^{15+9}	70
9	(Spain) Alex Haro	Ultimate	106^{4+8}		7^{13+2}		3^{20+12+3}	62
10	(Spain) Daniel Oliveras	Ultimate	7^{17+6}	4^{17+2}	14^{4}	35^{2}	12^{5+2}	55
11	(United States) Kellon Walch	Ultimate	5^{23+5}	5^{15+1}			7^{11}	55
12	(France) Francois Cazalet	Ultimate	29^{4+9}	31^{2+2}	12^{6+9}	27^{2+5}	6^{13}	52
13	(Spain) Lucas Cruz	Ultimate	Ret^{2}		5^{17+9}	37^{2+7}	Ret^{1}	38
14	(France) Loic Minaudier	Ultimate	6^{20+5}		46^{2+5}		55^{2+1}	35
15	(Czech Republic) Viktor Chytka	Ultimate	11^{11+4}	20^{3}	11^{7}		11^{6}	31
16	(Spain) Pablo Moreno	Ultimate	91^{4+2}			8^{13+1}	9^{8}	28
17	(Spain) Oriol Mena	Ultimate	12^{9+7}	27^{2+6}				24
18	(South Africa) Henry Carl Köhne	Ultimate	124^{4+1}	Ret^{1}	8^{11+3}	34^{2}	Ret^{1}	23
19	(Argentina) Bruno Jacomy	Challenger	64^{4}	Ret^{1}	21^{2}	6^{15}		22
20	(France) Stéphane Duplé	Challenger	111^{4+3}	8^{11}	22^{2}		59^{2}	22
21	(Poland) Maciej Marton	Ultimate		Ret^{1}		9^{11}	10^{7}	19
22	(Argentina) Valentina Pertegarini	Challenger	11^{7}	30^{2}	16^{2}	16^{6}	19^{2}	19
23	(United States) Andrew Short	Ultimate				Ret^{1+4}	58^{2+9+2}	18
24	(France) Xavier Panseri	SSV	Ret^{2}	29^{2}	9^{9+4}			17
25	(Spain) Jan Rosa I Vinas	Challenger		9^{9}	24^{2}	24^{3}	18^{2}	16
26	(France) Mathieu Baumel	Ultimate	23^{4+12}					16
27	(Brazil) Cadu Sachs	Ultimate	16^{5}			14^{8}	56^{2}	15
28	(France) Michaël Metge	Challenger	102^{4}	12^{8}			65^{2}	14
29	(Ukraine) Dmytro Tsyro	Challenger	36^{4}	13^{7}	20^{2}	Ret^{1}		14
30	(South Africa) Dennis Murphy	Ultimate			13^{5+9}			14
31	(Portugal) Bernardo Oliveira	SSV	31^{4}	24^{2}	38^{2}	17^{5}	Ret^{1}	14
32	(France) Lucie Baud	Ultimate	22^{4}			15^{7}	17^{2}	13
33	(Poland) Szymon Gospodarczyk	Ultimate				44^{2}	8^{9}	11
34	Konstantin Zhiltsov	Ultimate	121^{4+2}	33^{2}	44^{2}	Ret^{1}		11
35	(Netherlands) Mark Laan	Challenger				12^{9}		9
36	(Spain) Jaume Betriu	Challenger	Ret^{2}	16^{6}				8
37	(Portugal) Rui Franco	Challenger	73^{4}			21^{4}		8
38	(Portugal) Fausto Mota	SSV	49^{4}		42^{2}	49^{2}		8
39	(South Africa) Charan Moore	Challenger	90^{4}	38^{2}	26^{2}			8
40	Andrei Rudnitski	Challenger	Ret^{2}	17^{5}				7
41	(Argentina) Lisandro Sisterna	Challenger	18^{4+2}					6
42	(Netherlands) Tessa Klaassen	Ultimate	119^{4}		32^{2}			6
43	(Argentina) Sebastian Cesana	Challenger	Ret^{2}		15^{3}			5
44	(Portugal) Hugo Magalhães	Challenger	Ret^{2}	Ret^{1}			28^{2}	5
45	(France) Antoine Lecourbe	SSV		19^{4}				4
46	(Spain) Diego Ortega	Ultimate				32^{2}	16^{2}	4
47	(Italy) Maurizio Dominella	SSV		23^{2}	34^{2}			4
48	(Qatar) Nasser Al-Kuwari	Challenger	27^{4}					4
49	(China) Yicheng Wang	Ultimate	33^{4}					4
50	(Netherlands) Rudolf Meijer	SSV	60^{4}					4
51	(France) Patrick Jimbert	Challenger	116					4
51	(France) Patrick Jimbert	SSV		25^{2}	40^{2}			4
52	(France) Gregory Revest-Arnoux	SSV	75^{4}					4
53	(Germany) Taye Perry	Challenger	93^{4}					4
54	(France) Delphine Delfino	Ultimate	94^{4}					4
55	(Italy) Alberto Bertoldi	SSV	105^{4}					4
56	(United States) Sean Berriman	SSV	118^{4}					4
57	(Argentina) Bernardo Graue	SSV	120^{4}					4
58	(Portugal) João Miranda	Challenger		Ret^{1}	29^{2}			3
59	(Norway) Ola Fløene	Challenger	Ret^{2}					2
60	(Uruguay) Sergio Lafuente	SSV	Ret^{2}					2
61	(Portugal) Jorge Brandão	SSV	Ret^{2}					2
62	(Argentina) Augusto Sanz	Challenger					21^{2}	2
63	(Argentina) Andrés Frini	SSV					40^{2}	2
64	(France) Guilhem Alves	Ultimate					49^{2}	2
65	(United Arab Emirates) Khalid Alkendi	SSV		34^{2}				2
66	(France) Max Delfino	Challenger					Ret^{1}	1
67	(Portugal) David Megre	Challenger					Ret^{1}	1
Co-Drivers ineligible for championship points
	(South Africa) Boyd Dreyer	Ultimate			4			
	(Brazil) Luis Felipe Eckel	Ultimate				4		
	(South Africa) Dennis Murphy	Ultimate	Ret	6				
	(Portugal) Paulo Fiúza	Ultimate				7		
	(South Africa) Leonard Cremer	Ultimate	10		Ret		14	
	(Brazil) Kleber Cincea	Challenger		10	Ret	40	27	
	(Belgium) Frédéric Miclotte	Ultimate				13	48	
	(Estonia) Risto Lepik	Ultimate	13					
	(Poland) Michal Goleniewski	Ultimate		14				
	(Chile) Juan Pablo Latrach	Ultimate		15	19	20	38	
	(South Africa) Bertus Blignaut	Ultimate			17			
	(South Africa) Leander Pienaar	Ultimate			18			
	(France) Adrien Metge	Ultimate	20					
	(Germany) Taye Perry	Ultimate					20	
	(France) Christophe Crespo	Ultimate	21					
	(Spain) Cándido Carrera	Ultimate				22		
	(South Africa) Stuart Gregory	Ultimate	71		23			
	(France) Jean Michel Polato	Ultimate	83		25	Ret		
	(Portugal) Nélson Ramos	Ultimate				25		
	(Spain) José María Villalobos	Ultimate	32			36	26	
	(South Africa) Denzil Williamson	Ultimate			27			
	(Netherlands) Gydo Heimans	Ultimate	56		28	28	Ret	
	(Spain) Marc Solà	Ultimate	28				37	
	(Germany) Stephan Stensky	Ultimate				29		
	(Brazil) Maykel Justo	Ultimate	30					
	(South Africa) Rudi Heinlein	Ultimate			30			
	(Netherlands) Yvet Senders	Ultimate				30		
	(Netherlands) Arjan van Tiel	Ultimate				31	41	
	(South Africa) Jaco Kriel	Ultimate			31			
	(Netherlands) Rudolf Meijer	Ultimate					31	
	(Netherlands) Kala Senders	Ultimate				33		
	(France) Cédric Duplé	Ultimate			Ret		34	
	(Netherlands) Erik Lemmen	Ultimate	35					
	(Argentina) Bruno Jacomy	Ultimate					35	
	(South Africa) Gerhard Schutte	Ultimate			36			
	(United Arab Emirates) Ali Hasan Obaid	Ultimate		37				
	(Belgium) Olivier Imschoot	Ultimate	38					
	(Brazil) Fred Budtikevitz	Ultimate				38		
	(Poland) Konrad Dudziński	Ultimate					39	
	(Lithuania) Darius Leskauskas	Ultimate	41					
	(Czech Republic) Vaclav Pritzl	Ultimate	44					
	(France) Sebastien Delaunay	Ultimate	45					
	(South Africa) Wade Harris	Ultimate			45			
	(France) Max Delfino	Ultimate	46					
	(Austria) Michael Zajc	Ultimate				Ret	47	
	(France) Pascal Larroque	Ultimate	47					
	(South Africa) Johan Swemmer	Ultimate			47			
	(France) Arnold Brucy	Ultimate	48					
	(South Africa) Sean van Staden	Ultimate			48			
	(France) Anthony Pes	Ultimate	51					
	(France) Francois Borsotto	Ultimate	52					
	(Netherlands) Marcel Snijders	Ultimate	61				61	
	(Netherlands) Jasper Riezebos	Ultimate					63	
	(Poland) Rafał Marton	Ultimate					66	
	(France) Pascal Delacour	Ultimate	70					
	(Netherlands) Wouter de Graaff	Ultimate					70	
	(Netherlands) Antonius van Tiel	Ultimate	78					
	(China) Du Xuanyi	Ultimate	86					
	(France) Jean-Pierre Garcin	Ultimate	108					
	(Netherlands) Tom Coronel	Ultimate	110					
	(Lithuania) Aisvydas Paliukenas	Ultimate	136					
	(Kazakhstan) Alexey Mun	Ultimate	Ret					
	(France) Valentin Sarreaud	Ultimate	Ret					
	(Germany) Dirk von Zitzewitz	Ultimate	Ret					
	(China) Li Ma	Ultimate	Ret					
	(United Kingdom) Sam Sunderland	Ultimate	Ret					
	(Italy) Francesca Gasperi	Ultimate	Ret					
	(South Africa) Juan Möhr	Ultimate	Ret					
	(Poland) Szymon Gospodarczyk	Ultimate	Ret					
	(China) Hangting Guo	Ultimate	Ret					
	(Italy) Paolo Ceci	Ultimate	Ret					
	(Germany) Frank Stephan Preuss	Ultimate	Ret					
	(Italy) Maurizio Gerini	Ultimate	Ret					
	(South Africa) Roelof Janse van Vuren	Ultimate			Ret			
	(South Africa) Adriaan Roets	Ultimate			Ret			
	(United Kingdom) Andy Powell	Ultimate				Ret		
	(Netherlands) Richard Voor de Poorte	Ultimate				Ret		
	(Italy) Alessandro Verna	Ultimate					Ret	
	(Canada) Shane Hairsine	Ultimate					Ret	
	(France) Antoine Sanchez	Ultimate					Ret	
	(France) Lionel Romanin	Ultimate					Ret	
Pos.	Driver	Class	DAK (Saudi Arabia)	ABU (United Arab Emirates)	ZAF (South Africa)	PRT (Portugal)	MOR (Morocco)	Points

=== Challenger Drivers' & Co-Drivers' championships ===
Pos.	Driver	DAK (Saudi Arabia)	ABU (United Arab Emirates)	ZAF (South Africa)	PRT (Portugal)	MOR (Morocco)	Points
1	(Argentina) Nicolás Cavigliasso	1^{50+32}	9^{11+11}	2^{25+18}	5^{17+4}	2^{25+11+2}	206
2	(Spain) Pau Navarro	3^{30+20}	2^{25+18}	6^{13+10}	7^{13+10}	1^{30+11}	180
3	(Saudi Arabia) Dania Akeel	27^{9+17}	1^{30+17}	5^{15+10}	4^{20+8}	11^{15+14}	155
4	(Portugal) Gonçalo Guerreiro	2^{40+21}			1^{30+22}		113
5	(Saudi Arabia) Yasir Seaidan	23^{11+26}	4^{20+19}			15^{11+10}	97
6	(Poland) Adam Kus	5^{23+2}	5^{17+2}	3^{20+8}	Ret^{1}		73
7	(Netherlands) Puck Klaassen	19^{15}	11^{9+4}	7^{11+1}		3^{20+10+1}	71
8	(Qatar) Abdulaziz Al-Kuwari	4^{26+11}				13^{13+17+3}	70
9	(Qatar) Khalifa Al-Attiya	12^{20+4}	Ret^{1+1}	4^{17+9}		Ret^{1}	53
10	(Argentina) David Zille	Ret^{2}		1^{30+19}			51
11	(United States) Corbin Leaverton	20^{13+26}					39
12	(Netherlands) Pim Klaassen				3^{25+13}		38
13	(Portugal) Pedro Gonçalves	Ret^{2}	Ret^{1}		6^{15}	5^{17+1}	36
14	(United Arab Emirates) Khalid Aljafla	Ret^{2}	7^{13+3}				18
15	(Portugal) Mário Franco	15^{17}	Ret^{1}				18
16	(Spain) Eduard Pons	Ret^{2}	6^{15}				17
17	(Portugal) Rui Carneiro	Ret^{2}				Ret^{1}	3
18	(Sweden) Mattias Ekström				Ret^{1}		1
Drivers ineligible for championship points
	(Luxembourg) Charles Munster				2	17	
	(Brazil) Marcos Baumgart		3				
	(Netherlands) Paul Spierings	21				4	
	(France) Jedidia Favre	6					
	(Netherlands) Kees Koolen					6	
	(France) Alexandre Giroud	Ret				7	
	(France) Romain Locmane	7					
	(Spain) Óscar Ral	32				8	
	(Portugal) Nuno Rogério				8		
	(United Kingdom) David Mabbs		8				
	(France) Christophe Cresp	8					
	(France) Aurélien Bouchet	16				9	
	(Netherlands) Lex Peters	9				Ret	
	(Portugal) Hélder Oliveira				9		
	(Hungary) Pál Lónyai					10	
	(United Kingdom) Jonathan Hart		10				
	(United States) Zachary Lumsden	10					
	(Germany) Annett Quandt	11					
	(Chile) Emilio Fernández					12	
	(France) Benjamin Favre	13					
	(France) Louis Baudrand					14	
	(Netherlands) Gert-Jan van der Valk	14					
	(South Africa) Jayden Els					16	
	(United Kingdom) Richard Aczel	17					
	(Saudi Arabia) Maha Hamali					18	
	(France) Hervé Guillaume	18					
	(Netherlands) Riné Streppel					19	
	(Argentina) Kevin Benavides					20	
	(Poland) Piotr Beaupre	22					
	(Spain) Joan Piferrer	24					
	(Saudi Arabia) Hamad Nasser Alharbi	25					
	(Portugal) Maria Gameiro	26					
	(France) Loïc Frebourg	28					
	(France) Benjamin Lattard	29					
	(Switzerland) Alexandre Pesci	30					
	(Colombia) Javier Velez	31					
	(Spain) Joan Font	33					
	(France) Antoine Méo	34					
	(Poland) Lukasz Zoll	35					
	(Qatar) Ahmed Al-Kuwari	36					
	(United States) Pablo Copetti					Ret	
	(Slovakia) Martin Benko					Ret	
	(Portugal) Miguel Barbosa				Ret		
	(Portugal) Ricardo Porem	Ret					
	(Portugal) Luis Portela Morais	Ret					
	(France) Yannick Grezes	Ret					
	(Spain) Oscar Maso	Ret					
	(Spain) Xavier Foj	Ret					
	(Spain) Oscar Olivas	Ret					
	(United States) Craig Lumsden	Ret					
	(Saudi Arabia) Saleh Alsaif	Ret					
	(Italy) Gianpaolo Bedin	Ret					
Pos.	Driver	DAK (Saudi Arabia)	ABU (United Arab Emirates)	ZAF (South Africa)	PRT (Portugal)	MOR (Morocco)	Points

Pos.	Co-Driver	DAK (Saudi Arabia)	ABU (United Arab Emirates)	ZAF (South Africa)	PRT (Portugal)	MOR (Morocco)	Points
1	(Argentina) Valentina Pertegarini	1^{50+32}	9^{11+11}	2^{25+18}	5^{17+4}	2^{25+11+2}	206
2	(France) Stéphane Duplé	27^{9+17}	1^{30+17}	5^{15+10}		13^{13+17+3}	131
3	(Spain) Jan Rosa i Vinas		2^{25+18}	6^{13+10}	7^{13+10}	1^{30+11}	130
4	(Brazil) Cadu Sachs	2^{40+21}			4^{20+8}	11^{15+14}	118
5	(Argentina) Bruno Jacomy	12^{20+4}	Ret^{1}	4^{17+9}	1^{30+22}		104
6	(France) Michaël Metge	23^{11+26}	4^{20+19}			15^{11+10}	97
7	(Ukraine) Dmytro Tsyro	5^{23+2}	5^{17+2}	3^{20+8}	Ret^{1}		73
8	(Argentina) Sebastian Cesana	Ret^{2}		1^{30+19}			51
9	(Argentina) Lisandro Sisterna	3^{30+20}					50
10	(South Africa) Charan Moore	19^{15}	11^{9+4}	7^{11+1}			40
11	(Germany) Taye Perry	20^{13+26}					39
12	(Netherlands) Mark Laan				3^{25+13}		38
13	(Qatar) Nasser Al-Kuwari	4^{26+11}					37
14	(Portugal) Rui Franco	15^{17}			6^{15}		32
15	(Argentina) Augusto Sanz					3^{20+10+1}	31
16	(Portugal) Hugo Magalhães	Ret^{2}	Ret^{1}			5^{17+1}	21
17	Andrei Rudnitski	Ret^{2}	7^{13+3}				18
18	(Spain) Jaume Betriu	Ret^{2}	6^{15}				17
19	(Norway) Ola Fløene	Ret^{2}					2
20	(Portugal) João Miranda		Ret^{1}				1
21	(Portugal) David Megre					Ret^{1}	1
22	(France) Max Delfino					Ret^{1}	1
23	(Sweden) Emil Bergkvist				Ret^{1}		1
Co-Drivers ineligible for championship points
	(France) Max Delfino				2		
	(Brazil) Kleber Cincea		3				
	(Netherlands) Jan Pieter van der Stelt	21				4	
	(France) Antoine Lecourbe	6					
	(Netherlands) Jurgen van den Goorbergh					6	
	(France) Benjamin Boulloud	7					
	(France) Armelle Henry					7	
	(Spain) Pol Ros					8	
	(Portugal) Pedro Santos				8		
	(United Kingdom) David McBride		8				
	(France) Jean Brucy	8					
	(France) Elisa Huguenin	16				9	
	(Netherlands) Marko Salomons	9				Ret	
	(Portugal) Carlos Mendes				9		
	Alexey Kuzmich	25				10	
	(United Arab Emirates) Ali Mirza		10				
	(United States) Shannon Moham	10					
	(Sweden) Annie Seel	11					
	(Spain) Ion del Cid					12	
	(France) Thibaud Darroux	13					
	(France) Valentin Sarreaud					14	
	(Netherlands) Branco de Lange	14					
	(South Africa) Johan Swemmer					16	
	(France) Xavier Panseri					17	
	(Netherlands) Wouter Rosegaar	17					
	(France) Xavier Flick					18	
	(France) Maxime Guillaume	18					
	(Netherlands) Lisette Bakker					19	
	(Argentina) Lisandro Sisterna					20	
	(Poland) Jacek Czachor	22					
	(Spain) Joan Rubi	24					
	(Portugal) José Marques	26					
	(France) Franck Boulay	28					
	(France) Patrick Jimbert	29					
	(Switzerland) Stephan Kuhni	30					
	(Argentina) Gaston Mattarucco	31					
	(Spain) Xavier Blanco	32					
	(Spain) Sergi Brugue	33					
	(France) Guilhem Alves	34					
	(Poland) Michal Zoll	35					
	(Argentina) Augusto Sanz	36					
	(Argentina) Carlos Verza					Ret	
	(Slovakia) Marek Sýkora					Ret	
	(Portugal) João Rato				Ret		
	(France) Jeremy Jacomelli	Ret					
	(Portugal) Nuno Sousa	Ret					
	(Portugal) David Megre	Ret					
	(France) Anthony Drapeau	Ret					
	(Spain) Pedro Lopez	Ret					
	(Argentina) Facundo Jaton	Ret					
	(Spain) Luis Barrios	Ret					
	(United States) Jamie Lambert	Ret					
	(Lithuania) Albert Veliamovic	Ret					
	(Italy) Alberto Marcon	Ret					
Pos.	Driver	DAK (Saudi Arabia)	ABU (United Arab Emirates)	ZAF (South Africa)	PRT (Portugal)	MOR (Morocco)	Points

=== SSV Drivers' & Co-Drivers' championships ===
Pos.	Driver	DAK (Saudi Arabia)	ABU (United Arab Emirates)	ZAF (South Africa)	PRT (Portugal)	MOR (Morocco)	Points
1	(Portugal) Alexandre Pinto	3^{50+45}	6^{20+16}	6^{20+17}	2^{30+25}	Ret^{1}	224
2	(Italy) Enrico Gaspari	5^{40+30}	2^{30+20}	10^{15+14}	11^{25+16}		190
3	(Italy) Michele Cinotto	23^{23+4}	5^{25+14}	3^{25+14}			105
4	(Argentina) Manuel Andújar	28^{17+25}				6^{30+23+3}	98
5	(France) Claude Fournier	14^{26+2}	7^{17+10}	8^{17+9}			81
6	(United States) Sara Price	27^{20+35}					55
7	(Portugal) Mário Franco			1^{30+20}			50
8	(Netherlands) Roger Grouwels	8^{30+15}					45
9	(United Arab Emirates) Mansour Al-Helei		9^{15+14}				29
10	(Spain) Fernando Álvarez	Ret^{2+10}					12
11	(Argentina) Diego Martínez	Ret^{2}					2
12	(Spain) Carlos Vento	Ret^{2}					2
Drivers ineligible for championship points
	(Argentina) Jeremias Gonzalez Ferioli	30	1			2	
	(Chile) Francisco López	2				1	
	(Portugal) João Dias	Ret			1	Ret	
	(United States) Brock Heger	1					
	(United Kingdom) Richard Aczel			2	10	10	
	(Portugal) José Nogueira		3	5	13	11	
	(United States) Hunter Miller	10				3	
	(Portugal) Rúben Rodrigues				3		
	(Switzerland) Jérôme de Sadeleer	4					
	(United Arab Emirates) Yahya Al-Helei		4				
	(United Kingdom) George Halles			4			
	(Portugal) Paulo Rodrigues				4		
	(Portugal) Hélder Rodrigues					4	
	(Portugal) Filipe Lopes				5		
	(United States) Kyle Chaney					5	
	(Spain) Gerard Farrés	6					
	(Portugal) Mário Ferreira				6		
	(Spain) Domingo Roman	19		7			
	(Portugal) João Monteiro	7					
	(Portugal) Ricardo Sousa				7		
	(Lithuania) Mindaugas Sidabras					7	
	(United Arab Emirates) Atif Alzarouni		8				
	(Portugal) Afonso Oliveira				8		
	(Poland) Maciej Oleksowicz					8	
	(Portugal) Luís Cidade				9	Ret	
	(Spain) Fidel Castillo	9					
	(United Kingdom) Graham Knight			9			
	(Spain) Óscar Maso					9	
	(Norway) Hedda Hosås		10				
	(France) Benoît Lepietre	11				19	
	(Spain) José Ignacio Gayoso	Ret		11			
	(Romania) Marian Andreev		11				
	(Ecuador) Sebastian Guayasamin	12					
	(Portugal) Luís Portela				12		
	(Portugal) Rui Serpa					12	
	(France) Olivier Pernaut	13					
	(Spain) Juan Miguel Fidel					13	
	(France) Philippe Boutron	25				14	
	(France) Gregory Lefort	15					
	(Argentina) Gustavo Gallego					15	
	(Austria) Vic Flip				Ret	16	
	(France) Eric Croquelois	16					
	(Italy) Pietro Cinotto	17					
	(South Africa) Geoffrey Minnitt					17	
	(Netherlands) Sander Derikx	18					
	(Spain) Joan Piferrer					18	
	(Morocco) Souad Mouktadiri	20					
	(Spain) José María Cami					20	
	(France) Xavier De Soultrait	21					
	(Saudi Arabia) Hassan Jameel					21	
	(Saudi Arabia) Ibrahim Almuhna	22					
	(Belgium) Michaël Devos					22	
	(Bahrain) Hasan Alsadadi	24					
	(France) Florent Vayssade	26					
	(Italy) Stefano Marrini	29					
	(Japan) Shinsuke Umeda	31					
	(Poland) Grzegorz Brochocki	Ret					
	(Spain) José Vidaña	Ret					
	(Spain) Rafael Muñoz	Ret					
	(United Arab Emirates) Khalid Al-Qassimi		Ret				
	(Poland) Aleksander Szustkowski		Ret				
	(Spain) Pedro Caparrós					Ret	
	(France) Benoît Delmas					Ret	
	(Angola) Rui Silva					Ret	
	(Spain) Juan Manuel Mañá					Ret	
	(France) Raoul Fenestraz					Ret	
Pos.	Driver	DAK (Saudi Arabia)	ABU (United Arab Emirates)	ZAF (South Africa)	PRT (Portugal)	MOR (Morocco)	Points

Pos.	Co-Driver	DAK (Saudi Arabia)	ABU (United Arab Emirates)	ZAF (South Africa)	PRT (Portugal)	MOR (Morocco)	Points
1	(Portugal) Bernardo Oliveira	3^{50+45}	6^{20+16}	6^{20+17}	2^{30+25}	Ret^{1}	224
2	(Spain) Fausto Mota	5^{40+30}		10^{15+14}	11^{25+16}		140
3	(Italy) Maurizio Dominella		5^{25+14}	3^{25+14}			78
4	(Argentina) Andrés Frini					6^{30+23+3}	56
5	(United States) Sean Berriman	27^{20+35}					55
6	(France) Patrick Jimbert		7^{17+10}	8^{17+9}			53
7	(France) Antoine Lecourbe		2^{30+20}				50
8	(Portugal) João Miranda			1^{30+20}			50
9	(Netherlands) Rudolf Meijer	8^{30+15}					45
10	(Argentina) Bernardo Graue	28^{17+25}					42
11	(United Arab Emirates) Khalid Alkendi		9^{15+14}				29
12	(France) Gregory Revest-Arnoux	14^{26+2}					28
13	(Italy) Alberto Bertoldi	23^{23+4}					27
14	(France) Xavier Panseri	Ret^{2+10}					12
15	(Portugal) Jorge Brandão	Ret^{2}					2
16	(Uruguay) Sergio Lafuente	Ret^{2}					2
Co-Drivers ineligible for championship points
	(Portugal) Rui Pita				1	12	
	(Argentina) José Sebastian Cesana		1			Ret	
	(United States) Max Eddy	1					
	(Chile) Álvaro León					1	
	(Netherlands) Wouter Rosegaar			2	10	10	
	(Argentina) Pedro Gonzalo Rinaldi	30				2	
	(Chile) Juan Pablo Latrach	2					
	(Portugal) Arcelio Couto		3	5	13	11	
	(Portugal) Rui Paulo				3		
	(United States) Jeremy Gray					3	
	(Portugal) Gonçalo Reis	Ret				4	
	(Spain) Diego Ortega	4					
	(United Arab Emirates) Mohammed Hamri		4				
	(France) Max Delfino			4			
	(Portugal) João Miranda				4		
	(Portugal) André Lopes				5		
	(United States) Jacob Argubright					5	
	(Spain) Toni Vingut	6					
	(Portugal) Miguel Silva				6		
	(Portugal) Nuno Morais	7				Ret	
	(Spain) Gustavo Ibeas			7			
	(Portugal) Jorge Henriques				7		
	(Lithuania) Ernestas Česokas					7	
	(Saudi Arabia) Mohammed Hassan Innab		8				
	(Portugal) Fábio Belo				8		
	(Poland) Marcin Sienkiewicz					8	
	(Argentina) Anuar Osman	9					
	(United Kingdom) David Watson			9			
	(Portugal) Valter Cardoso				9		
	(Spain) Pedro López					9	
	(United States) Andrew Short	10					
	(Spain) Pol Tibau		10				
	(Spain) Santiago Ramiro	Ret		11			
	(France) Rodrigue Relmy-Madinska	11					
	(Romania) Matei Negulescu		11				
	(Argentina) Fernando Acosta	12					
	(Portugal) David Megre				12		
	(France) Benjamin Riviere	13					
	(Spain) Javier Ventaja					13	
	(France) Mayeul Barbet	25				14	
	(France) George Da Cruz	15					
	(Argentina) Eugenio Arrieta					15	
	(Austria) Gerhard Schmiedberger				Ret	16	
	(France) Bruno Raymond	16					
	(Italy) Martino Albertini	17					
	(South Africa) Stuart Gregory					17	
	(Netherlands) Marnix Leeuw	18					
	(Spain) Xavier Blanco					18	
	(Spain) Oscar Bravo	19					
	(France) Peter Serra					19	
	(France) Vincent Ferri	20					
	(Spain) Cristian Cami					20	
	(Poland) Maciej Giemza		Ret			21	
	(France) Martin Bonnet	21					
	(Saudi Arabia) Faisal Alsuwayh	22					
	(France) Karim Ez-Zouaq					22	
	(Poland) Marcin Pasek	24					
	(France) Nicolas Rey	26					
	(Italy) Matteo Lardori	29					
	(France) Paul Durame	31					
	(Poland) Grzegorz Komar	Ret					
	(Spain) Mario Garrido	Ret					
	(Spain) Daniel Cámara	Ret					
	(Norway) Ola Fløene		Ret				
	(Spain) Abel Montoya					Ret	
	(Morocco) Firdouass Al-Fannane					Ret	
	(Angola) Francisco Albuquerque					Ret	
	(Spain) Giovanna di Blasi					Ret	
	(France) Serge Gounon					Ret	
Pos.	Driver	DAK (Saudi Arabia)	ABU (United Arab Emirates)	ZAF (South Africa)	PRT (Portugal)	MOR (Morocco)	Points

== FIM World Rally-Raid Championship ==
- Only riders competing in the RallyGP category are eligible for the FIM Rally-Raid World Championship. World Cup titles are available for champions of the Rally2, Rally3, and Quad categories.

=== Entry list ===
RallyGP Teams & Riders
Constructor	Vehicle	Team	Rider	Rounds
Hero	450 Rally	(India) Hero MotoSports Team Rally	(Botswana) Ross Branch	All
Hero	450 Rally	(India) Hero MotoSports Team Rally	(Chile) José Ignacio Cornejo	All
Hero	450 Rally	(India) Hero MotoSports Team Rally	(Germany) Sebastian Bühler	1
Honda	CRF 450 Rally	(Japan) Monster Energy Honda HRC	(Spain) Tosha Schareina	All
Honda	CRF 450 Rally	(Japan) Monster Energy Honda HRC	(France) Adrien Van Beveren	All
Honda	CRF 450 Rally	(Japan) Monster Energy Honda HRC	(United States) Ricky Brabec	All
Honda	CRF 450 Rally	(Japan) Monster Energy Honda HRC	(United States) Skyler Howes	All
Honda	CRF 450 Rally	(Japan) Monster Energy Honda HRC	(Chile) Pablo Quintanilla	1
KTM	450 Rally Factory	(Austria) Red Bull KTM Factory Racing	(Australia) Daniel Sanders	All
KTM	450 Rally Factory	(Austria) Red Bull KTM Factory Racing	(Argentina) Luciano Benavides	All
KTM	450 Rally Factory	(Austria) Red Bull KTM Factory Racing	(Argentina) Kevin Benavides	1
KTM	450 Rally Replica	(Netherlands) BAS World KTM Racing Team	(South Africa) Bradley Cox	1
Sherco	SHR 450	(France) Sherco TVS Rally Factory	(South Africa) Bradley Cox	3–5
Rally2 Teams & Riders
Constructor	Vehicle	Team	Rider	Rounds
Beta	RR 430	(Spain) Pepe Flory Rider Europe con Diabetes	(Spain) José Flores	5
Fantic	XEF 450 Rally Factory	(Italy) Fantic Racing Rally Team	(France) Jeremy Miroir	1
Fantic	XEF 450 Rally Factory	(Italy) Fantic Racing Rally Team	(Italy) Tommaso Montanari	1
Fantic	XEF 450 Rally Factory	(Italy) Fantic Racing Rally Team	(Chile) Tomas De Gavardo	1
Fantic	XEF 450 Rally Factory	(Italy) Fantic Racing Rally Team	(Spain) Sandra Gómez	1
Fantic	XEF 450 Rally Factory	(France) Fantic Racing	(France) Maxime Pouponnot	1
Gas Gas	450 Rally Factory Replica	(Spain) Xraids Experience	(Argentina) Juan Santiago Rostan	1
Gas Gas	450 Rally Factory Replica	(France) Team RS Concept	(France) Fabien Domas	1
Gas Gas	450 Rally Factory Replica	(France) Team RS Concept	(France) Guillaume Hucher	5
Gas Gas	450 Rally Factory Replica	(France) Team RS Concept	(France) Wilfried Dagommer	5
Gas Gas	450 Rally Factory Replica	(Lebanon) MX Academy	(Lebanon) Rafic Eid	1
Gas Gas	450 Rally Factory Replica	(France) Môleagriforest/Maglandraceway	(France) Michael Jacobi	1
Gas Gas	450 Rally Factory Replica	(France) Team Casteu Trophy	(France) Arnaud Domet	1
Gas Gas	450 Rally Factory Replica	(France) Team Casteu Trophy	(France) Bertrand Domet	1
Gas Gas	450 Rally Factory Replica	(United Arab Emirates) SRG Motorsports	(India) Rajendra Revallar	2
Gas Gas	450 Rally Factory Replica		(Belgium) Xavier Gregoire	3
Gas Gas	450 Rally Factory Replica	(France) Universal Ride	(France) Loïc Teinturier	5
Gas Gas	450 Rally Factory Replica	(France) Nomade Racing	(France) Guillaume Jaunin	5
Gas Gas	450 Rally Factory Replica	(France) Live in a Rear Wheel	(France) Benjamin Perinet	5
Gas Gas	450 Rally Factory Replica	(Italy) Solarys Racing	(Italy) Federico Ghiringhelli	5
Gas Gas	450 Rally Factory Replica	(Spain) Pedregà Team	(Mexico) Adolfo Alonso	5
Gas Gas	RX 450	(France) Challenger Racing Team	(France) Charlie Herbst	1
Gas Gas	RX 450	(Australia) BOAC Racing	(Australia) Martin Chalmers	2
Gas Gas	RX 450	(United Arab Emirates) Desert Spirit	(United Kingdom) Jason Joslin	2
Gas Gas	RX 450	(Italy) Solarys Racing	(Italy) Pierpaolo Vivaldi	5
Hero	450 Rally	(India) Hero MotoSports Team Rally	(Austria) Tobias Ebster	3–5
Honda	CRF 450 Rally	(Japan) Honda HRC	(France) Romain Dumontier	1
Honda	CRF 450 Rally	(Japan) Honda HRC	(United States) Preston Campbell	4–5
Honda	CRF 450 Rally	(Japan) Honda HRC	(Portugal) Martim Ventura	4–5
Honda	CRF 450 Rally	(Italy) RS Moto Honda Rally Team	(United States) Jacob Argubright	1
Honda	CRF 450 Rally	(Italy) RS Moto Honda Rally Team	(Italy) Paolo Lucci	1, 5
Honda	CRF 450 Rally	(Italy) RS Moto Honda Rally Team	(Switzerland) Yann Di Mauro	1
Honda	CRF 450 Rally	(Italy) RS Moto Honda Rally Team	(Italy) Lorenzo Maestrami	1
Honda	CRF 450 Rally	(Italy) RS Moto Honda Rally Team	(Japan) Shinya Fujiwara	5
Honda	CRF 450 Rally	(Italy) Rally POV	(Italy) Tiziano Interno	1
Honda	CRF 450 Rally	(Italy) Rally POV	(Italy) Fabio Bernardini	5
Honda	CRF 450 Rally	(Belgium) Anquety Motorsport	(Belgium) Jérôme Martiny	5
Honda	CRF 450 Rally	(Netherlands) HT Rally Raid	(Lithuania) Dovydas Karka	5
Honda	CRF 450 Rally	(Netherlands) HT Rally Raid	(Chile) Ruy Barbosa	5
Honda	CRF 450 Rally	(Netherlands) HT Rally Raid	(Netherlands) Ian Olthof	5
Honda	CRF 450 Rally	(Netherlands) HT Rally Raid	(Kenya) Gavin Mouritzen	5
Honda	CRF 450 Rally	(Netherlands) HT Rally Raid	(Netherlands) Deen Munsters	5
Honda	CRF 450 Rally	(France) Team D	(France) Damien Gueno	5
Hoto	Rally	(China) Hoto Factory Racing	(France) Xavier Flick	1
Hoto	Rally	(China) Hoto Factory Racing	(Lithuania) Arūnas Gelažninkas	1
Hoto	Rally	(China) Hoto Factory Racing	(China) Fang Xiangliang	1
Husqvarna	450 Rally Replica	(Netherlands) HT Rally Raid	(Lithuania) Nerimantas Jucius	1
Husqvarna	450 Rally Replica	(Netherlands) HT Rally Raid	(Norway) Axel Mustad	1
Husqvarna	450 Rally Replica	(Netherlands) HT Rally Raid	(South Africa) Willem Avenant	1
Husqvarna	450 Rally Replica	(Netherlands) HT Rally Raid	(Uruguay) Fabian Von Thuengen	1
Husqvarna	450 Rally Replica	(Netherlands) HT Rally Raid	(Germany) Markus Hertlein	2
Husqvarna	450 Rally Replica	(Netherlands) HT Rally Raid	(Netherlands) Kees Koolen	2
Husqvarna	450 Rally Replica	(Netherlands) HT Rally Raid	(Mongolia) Khaliunbold Erdenebileg	2
Husqvarna	450 Rally Replica	(Netherlands) HT Rally Raid	(Paraguay) Blas Zapag	2
Husqvarna	450 Rally Replica	(Netherlands) HT Rally Raid	(Netherlands) Ian Olthof	3
Husqvarna	450 Rally Replica	(Netherlands) HT Rally Raid	(Italy) Massimo Camurri	3
Husqvarna	450 Rally Replica	(Netherlands) HT Rally Raid	(Argentina) Gustavo Milutin	3
Husqvarna	450 Rally Replica	(United Arab Emirates) SRG Motorsports	(South Africa) Michael Docherty	2
Husqvarna	450 Rally Replica	(United Arab Emirates) SRG Motorsports	(Italy) Massimiliano Guerrini	2
Husqvarna	450 Rally Replica	(Belgium) Anquety Motorsport	(Belgium) Jérôme Martiny	1
Husqvarna	450 Rally Replica	(Czech Republic) Fesh Fesh Team	(Czech Republic) Adam Peschel	1
Husqvarna	450 Rally Replica	(Portugal) Bs – Frutas Patricia Pilar	(Portugal) Bruno Santos	1, 4–5
Husqvarna	450 Rally Replica	(Czech Republic) Moto Racing Group	(Poland) Bartlomiej Tabin	1
Husqvarna	450 Rally Replica	DNA Air Filters Racing Team - Enduro Greece	(Greece) Vasileios Boudros	1
Husqvarna	450 Rally Replica	(France) Nomade Racing	(France) Max Bianucci	1
Husqvarna	450 Rally Replica	(France) Nomade Racing	(France) Mathieu Feuvrier	1, 5
Husqvarna	450 Rally Replica	(France) Nomade Racing	(France) Charles Pick	5
Husqvarna	450 Rally Replica	(Italy) Team Rebel X	(Italy) Manuel Lucchese	1
Husqvarna	450 Rally Replica	(France) Team Casteu Trophy	(France) David Casteu	1
Husqvarna	450 Rally Replica	(Slovenia) Team Marcic	(Slovenia) Simon Marcic	1
Husqvarna	450 Rally Replica	(Spain) Melilla Ciudad Del Deporte	(Spain) Rachid Al-Lal	1
Husqvarna	450 Rally Replica	(France) Motorbike Off Road Adventures Lyberty	(France) Stéphane Darques	1
Husqvarna	450 Rally Replica	(Portugal) Old Friends Rally Team	(Portugal) Martim Ventura	2
Husqvarna	450 Rally Replica	(Portugal) Old Friends Rally Team	(Spain) Ricardo Lastra	2, 5
Husqvarna	450 Rally Replica	(Portugal) Old Friends Rally Team	(Portugal) Pedro Pinheiro	2–3, 5
Husqvarna	450 Rally Replica	(United Arab Emirates) Motozone Racing	(United Kingdom) Alex McInnes	2
Husqvarna	450 Rally Replica	(France) LB Racing	(France) Ludvig Messager	2
Husqvarna	450 Rally Replica	(United Kingdom) Searles2Dakar	(United Kingdom) Craig Searles	2
Husqvarna	450 Rally Replica	(United Kingdom) Searles2Dakar	(United Kingdom) Carl Searles	2
Husqvarna	450 Rally Replica	(France) Ateliers Utopia	(France) Alessandro Mendoza	2
Husqvarna	450 Rally Replica	Poland National Team	(Poland) Marcin Talaga	2
Husqvarna	450 Rally Replica	(Switzerland) Nomadas Adventure	(Mexico) Roberto Mariscal	2
Husqvarna	450 Rally Replica	(Spain) Pedregà Team	(Argentina) Jeremías Pascual	4–5
Husqvarna	450 Rally Replica	(Italy) Solarys Racing	(Italy) Tommaso Montanari	5
Husqvarna	450 Rally Replica	(Italy) Solarys Racing	(Italy) Alessandro Rigoni	5
Husqvarna	450 Rally Replica	(France) J6 Performance	(France) Johan Wang-Chang	5
Husqvarna	450 Rally Replica	(United Kingdom) Happy Rally	(Republic of Ireland) Gary Ennis	5
Husqvarna	450 Rally Replica	(Spain) Pedregà Team	(Mexico) Armando Alonso	5
Kove	450 Rally	(China) Kove Factory Racing	(France) Neels Theric	1, 5
Kove	450 Rally	(China) Kove Factory Racing	(China) Sunier Sunier	5
Kove	450 Rally	(China) Supersunr Kove Team	(China) Sunier Sunier	1
Kove	450 Rally	(China) Supersunr Kove Team	(China) Deng Liansong	1
Kove	450 Rally	Kove Canada	(Canada) Jordan Strachan	1
Kove	450 Rally	(United Kingdom) WTF Racing	(United Kingdom) James Hillier	1
Kove	450 Rally	(United Arab Emirates) Desert Storm Racing	(Saudi Arabia) Badr Alhamdan	1–2
Kove	450 Rally	(United Arab Emirates) Desert Storm Racing	(India) Jatin Jain	1–2, 4–5
Kove	450 Rally	(United Arab Emirates) SRG Motorsports	(United Arab Emirates) Abdulla Lanjawi	2
Kove	450 Rally		(South Africa) Alex Torrao	3
Kove	450 Rally	Amsoil - Martin Camp	(South Africa) Martin Camp	3, 5
Kove	450 Rally		(India) Yugandhar Prasad Jasti	3
Kove	450 Rally		(Italy) Fabio Bernardini	4
Kove	450 Rally		(India) Aishwarya Pissay	4
Kove	450 Rally	(Czech Republic) Orion - Moto Racing Group	(Czech Republic) Milan Engel	5
Kove	450 Rally	(Czech Republic) Orion - Moto Racing Group	(Czech Republic) Milan Brabec	5
Kove	450 Rally	(France) Raw Motorsports	(France) Steve Pasco	5
Kove	450 Rally	(France) Raw Motorsports	(France) Eddy Pasco	5
Kove	450 Rally	(France) JR Team	(France) Julien Regent	5
Kove	450 Rally Ex	(Spain) Pont Grup - Kove	(Spain) Javi Vega	1
Kove	450 Rally Ex	(Italy) Team Kove Italia Lucky Explorer	(Italy) Ottavio Missoni	1
Kove	450 Rally Ex	(Italy) Team Kove Italia Lucky Explorer	(Italy) Cesare Zacchetti	1
Kove	450 Rally Ex	(Italy) Team Kove Italia Lucky Explorer	(Italy) Andrea Gava	5
KTM	450 Rally Replica	(Austria) Red Bull KTM Factory Racing	(Spain) Edgar Canet	All
KTM	450 Rally Replica	(Netherlands) BAS World KTM Racing Team	(Slovenia) Toni Mulec	1
KTM	450 Rally Replica	(Netherlands) BAS World KTM Racing Team	(South Africa) Michael Docherty	1, 3–5
KTM	450 Rally Replica	(Netherlands) BAS World KTM Racing Team	(Australia) Toby Hederics	1
KTM	450 Rally Replica	(Netherlands) BAS World KTM Racing Team	(Guatemala) Francisco Arredondo	1
KTM	450 Rally Replica	(Netherlands) BAS World KTM Racing Team	(Czech Republic) Jiri Broz	1, 5
KTM	450 Rally Replica	(Netherlands) BAS World KTM Racing Team	(France) Mathieu Doveze	1, 5
KTM	450 Rally Replica	(Netherlands) BAS World KTM Racing Team	(Poland) Konrad Dabrowski	3
KTM	450 Rally Replica	(Netherlands) BAS World KTM Racing Team	(Poland) Filip Grot	3
KTM	450 Rally Replica	(Netherlands) BAS World KTM Racing Team	(United States) Nathan Rafferty	3
KTM	450 Rally Replica	(Netherlands) BAS World KTM Racing Team	(Netherlands) Joël van Mechelen	4
KTM	450 Rally Replica	(Netherlands) BAS World KTM Racing Team	(Romania) Emanuel Gyenes	5
KTM	450 Rally Replica	(Netherlands) BAS World KTM Racing Team	(Mongolia) Khaliunbold Erdenebileg	5
KTM	450 Rally Replica	(Netherlands) BAS World KTM Racing Team	(United States) Brandon Krause	5
KTM	450 Rally Replica	(Netherlands) BAS World KTM Racing Team	(Chile) Tomas de Gavardo	5
KTM	450 Rally Replica	(Netherlands) BAS World KTM Racing Team	(Austria) Tobias Ebster	1
KTM	450 Rally Replica	(United Arab Emirates) SRG Motorsports	(Austria) Tobias Ebster	2
KTM	450 Rally Replica	(United Arab Emirates) SRG Motorsports	(Italy) Mattia Riva	2
KTM	450 Rally Replica	(Poland) DUUST Rally Team	(Poland) Konrad Dabrowski	1–2, 4–5
KTM	450 Rally Replica	(Poland) DUUST Rally Team	(Poland) Robert Przybylowski	2
KTM	450 Rally Replica	(Poland) DUUST Rally Team	(Germany) Justin Gerlach	1
KTM	450 Rally Replica	(Germany) JG Racing	(Germany) Justin Gerlach	2, 4
KTM	450 Rally Replica	(Czech Republic) Cajdašrot Dakar Team	(Czech Republic) Dušan Drdaj	1
KTM	450 Rally Replica	(Czech Republic) Cajdašrot Dakar Team	(Czech Republic) Járomír Romančík	1
KTM	450 Rally Replica	(Czech Republic) Cajdašrot Dakar Team	(Czech Republic) Libor Pletka	5
KTM	450 Rally Replica	(Romania) Autonet Motorcycle Team	(Romania) Emanuel Gyenes	1
KTM	450 Rally Replica	(France) Esprit KTM	(France) Benjamin Melot	1, 5
KTM	450 Rally Replica	(Czech Republic) Orion - Moto Racing Group	(Czech Republic) Milan Engel	1
KTM	450 Rally Replica	(Czech Republic) Orion - Moto Racing Group	(Czech Republic) Martin Prokes	1
KTM	450 Rally Replica	(Czech Republic) Stojrent Racing	(Czech Republic) Jan Brabec	1
KTM	450 Rally Replica	(Czech Republic) Stojrent Racing	(Ukraine) Andriy Polyukhin	5
KTM	450 Rally Replica	(Germany) Autoservice Wiedemann/Wiedemann Motorsports	(Germany) Mike Wiedemann	1
KTM	450 Rally Replica	(France) Nomade Racing	(France) Julien Dalbec	1
KTM	450 Rally Replica	(France) Nomade Racing	(France) Philippe Gendron	1
KTM	450 Rally Replica	(France) Nomade Racing	(France) Matthieu Cauvin	5
KTM	450 Rally Replica	(France) Nomade Racing	(France) Nicolas Horeaux	5
KTM	450 Rally Replica	(France) Nomade Racing	(France) Mathieu Girard	5
KTM	450 Rally Replica	(France) Nomade Racing	(France) Adrien Costes	5
KTM	450 Rally Replica	(France) Nomade Racing	(France) Olivier Lete	5
KTM	450 Rally Replica	(France) Nomade Racing	(France) Thibault Boucherot	5
KTM	450 Rally Replica	(France) Nomade Racing	(France) Benjamin Georjon	5
KTM	450 Rally Replica	(France) Nomade Racing	(France) Clément Dumais	5
KTM	450 Rally Replica	(France) Nomade Racing	(France) Paul Roux dit Buisson	5
KTM	450 Rally Replica	(France) Nomade Racing	(France) Guillaume Martin	5
KTM	450 Rally Replica	(France) Nomade Racing	(South Africa) Dwain Barnard	1
KTM	450 Rally Replica		(South Africa) Dwain Barnard	3
KTM	450 Rally Replica	(Czech Republic) SP Moto Bohemia	(Czech Republic) David Pabiska	1, 4–5
KTM	450 Rally Replica	(France) TLD Racing	(France) Jeremie Gerber	1
KTM	450 Rally Replica	(Italy) Motoclub Yashica	(Italy) Andrea Winkler	1
KTM	450 Rally Replica	(France) Solurent Racing	(France) Marshall Meplon	1, 4
KTM	450 Rally Replica	(Spain) Joyride Race Service	(Colombia) Francisco Álvarez	1
KTM	450 Rally Replica	(Spain) Joyride Race Service	(Denmark) Thomas Kongshøj	1
KTM	450 Rally Replica	(Spain) Joyride Race Service	(Lithuania) Mykolas Paulavičius	1
KTM	450 Rally Replica	(Spain) Joyride Race Service	(Argentina) Leonardo Cola	2, 5
KTM	450 Rally Replica	(Spain) Joyride Race Service	(Spain) Iñigo Zardoya	2, 5
KTM	450 Rally Replica	(Spain) Joyride Race Service	(Spain) Joan Viñals	2, 4
KTM	450 Rally Replica	(Spain) Joyride Race Service	(Spain) Martí Escofet	4
KTM	450 Rally Replica	(Spain) Joyride Race Service	(Australia) David Brock	4
KTM	450 Rally Replica	(Spain) Joyride Race Service	(Belgium) Mathieu Liebaert	4
KTM	450 Rally Replica	(Spain) Joyride Race Service	(Switzerland) Dennis Mildenberger	5
KTM	450 Rally Replica	(Spain) Xraids Experience	(France) Guillaume Chollet	1
KTM	450 Rally Replica	(Spain) Xraids Experience	(United Kingdom) Robbie Wallace	1
KTM	450 Rally Replica	(Spain) Xraids Experience	(India) Ashish Raorane	1
KTM	450 Rally Replica	(Spain) Xraids Experience	(Chile) Ruy Barbosa	2–3
KTM	450 Rally Replica	(Spain) Xraids Experience	(Chile) Andro Korlaet	2, 5
KTM	450 Rally Replica	(Spain) Xraids Experience	(Argentina) Sebastian Urquia	2–5
KTM	450 Rally Replica	(Spain) Xraids Experience	(India) Abdul Wahid	2
KTM	450 Rally Replica	(Spain) Xraids Experience	(Argentina) Eduardo Alan	2
KTM	450 Rally Replica	(Spain) Xraids Experience	(Argentina) Juan Santiago Rostan	3, 5
KTM	450 Rally Replica	(Spain) Xraids Experience	(Chile) John Medina	3
KTM	450 Rally Replica	(Spain) Xraids Experience	(Spain) Dominique Cizeau	3
KTM	450 Rally Replica	(Spain) Xraids Experience	(Spain) Alfredo Pellicer	4–5
KTM	450 Rally Replica	(Spain) Xraids Experience	(Spain) Alonso Trigo	5
KTM	450 Rally Replica	(Spain) Xraids Experience	(Chile) Gabriel Balut	5
KTM	450 Rally Replica	(Spain) Xraids Experience	(Argentina) Baltazar Frezze	5
KTM	450 Rally Replica	(Spain) Xraids Experience	(Costa Rica) José Daniel Miranda	5
KTM	450 Rally Replica	(Spain) Xraids Experience	(India) Aishwarya Pissay	5
KTM	450 Rally Replica	(Lithuania) Flexit Go - AG Dakar School	(Lithuania) Modestas Siliūnas	1
KTM	450 Rally Replica	(France) Team RS Concept	(France) Clément Artaud	1
KTM	450 Rally Replica	(France) Team RS Concept	(France) Benjamin Bourdariat	1
KTM	450 Rally Replica	(France) Team RS Concept	(France) Pierre Peyrard	5
KTM	450 Rally Replica	(France) Team RS Concept	(France) Pierre Lerosier	5
KTM	450 Rally Replica	(France) Team RS Concept	(France) Guillaume Rosier	5
KTM	450 Rally Replica	(Argentina) Med Racing Team	(Uruguay) Alvaro Coppola	1
KTM	450 Rally Replica	(Argentina) Med Racing Team	(Ecuador) Carlos Malo	1
KTM	450 Rally Replica	(China) Da Hai Dao Zero Mileage Lubricant	(China) Zhang Min	1
KTM	450 Rally Replica	(China) Da Hai Dao Zero Mileage Lubricant	(China) Zhao Hongyi	1
KTM	450 Rally Replica	(Spain) Club Aventura Touareg	(Portugal) Gad Nachmani	1
KTM	450 Rally Replica	(Spain) Club Aventura Touareg	(Spain) Ignacio Sanchis	1
KTM	450 Rally Replica	(Spain) Club Aventura Touareg	(Spain) Gines Belzunces	1
KTM	450 Rally Replica	(Spain) Club Aventura Touareg	(Spain) José Vicente Fernandez	5
KTM	450 Rally Replica	(Spain) Adec Competicio Total Team	(Spain) Oscar Hernandez	1
KTM	450 Rally Replica	(Spain) Adec Competicio Total Team	(Spain) Juanjo Martínez	1
KTM	450 Rally Replica	(France) Team DB Racing	(France) Damien Bataller	1
KTM	450 Rally Replica	(France) Révolte Racing	(France) Jean-Philippe Révolte	1
KTM	450 Rally Replica	(Switzerland) Nomadas Adventure	(Mongolia) Murun Purevdorj	1
KTM	450 Rally Replica	(Switzerland) Nomadas Adventure	(Switzerland) Dennis Mildenberger	1
KTM	450 Rally Replica	(Switzerland) Nomadas Adventure	(Australia) Andrew Houlihan	1
KTM	450 Rally Replica	(Switzerland) Nomadas Adventure	(Australia) David Brock	2
KTM	450 Rally Replica	(Switzerland) Nomadas Adventure	(Australia) Darren Goodman	5
KTM	450 Rally Replica	(France) Enduro Normandie	(France) Jim Moisa	1
KTM	450 Rally Replica	(France) Enduro Normandie	(France) Thomas Georgin	1
KTM	450 Rally Replica	(France) Enduro Normandie	(France) Alexandre Yon	1
KTM	450 Rally Replica	(Saudi Arabia) Hleem	(Saudi Arabia) Ahmed Aljaber	1
KTM	450 Rally Replica	(Saudi Arabia) Hleem	(Saudi Arabia) Abdulhalim Almogheera	1
KTM	450 Rally Replica	(Ecuador) KTM JP1 Motorcycles	(Ecuador) Juan Puga	1
KTM	450 Rally Replica	(Lebanon) Desert Storm Racing	(Lebanon) Ehab Al Hakeem	1
KTM	450 Rally Replica	(Spain) Team Monforte Rally - Galicia	(Spain) Eduardo Iglesias	1
KTM	450 Rally Replica	(Saudi Arabia) Cloud Racing	(Saudi Arabia) Mishal Alghuneim	1
KTM	450 Rally Replica	(Saudi Arabia) Cloud Racing	(Bahrain) Salman Farhan	1
KTM	450 Rally Replica	(Italy) Zeranta	(Italy) Iader Giraldi	1
KTM	450 Rally Replica	(Spain) Casas Cube – Ártabros Rally	(Spain) Ivan Merichal	1
KTM	450 Rally Replica	(France) Team Casteu Trophy	(Switzerland) Alexandre Vaudan	1
KTM	450 Rally Replica	(Lithuania) AG Dakar School - Dubai	(Lithuania) Gediminas Šatkus	1
KTM	450 Rally Replica	(Lithuania) AG Dakar School - Dubai	(Lithuania) Edvard Sokolovskij	2
KTM	450 Rally Replica	(Spain) Pedregà Team	(Spain) Ferran Zaragoza	1
KTM	450 Rally Replica	(Spain) Pedregà Team	(Spain) Arnau Lledó	4–5
KTM	450 Rally Replica	(Spain) Pedregà Team	(Spain) Guillem Martinez	5
KTM	450 Rally Replica	(Spain) Pedregà Team	(Spain) Joan Carles Guillén	5
KTM	450 Rally Replica	(Germany) North Squad	(Germany) Philip Horlemann	2
KTM	450 Rally Replica	(Germany) RNS Electronics	(Germany) Tony Schattat	2
KTM	450 Rally Replica	(United Arab Emirates) Vendetta Racing	(United Kingdom) Thomas Childs	2
KTM	450 Rally Replica	(United Arab Emirates) Desert Spirit	(United Arab Emirates) Hamdan Al-Ali	2
KTM	450 Rally Replica	(South Africa) JBFE Systems	(South Africa) Mauritz Meiring	3
KTM	450 Rally Replica		(France) Matthieu Jauffraud	3
KTM	450 Rally Replica		(South Africa) Anthony Raynard	3
KTM	450 Rally Replica	(France) Live in a Rear Wheel	(France) Benjamin Pousset	3, 5
KTM	450 Rally Replica		(India) Jatin Jain	3
KTM	450 Rally Replica		(South Africa) Martin Lourens	3
KTM	450 Rally Replica	(Portugal) Old Friends Rally Team	(Portugal) Jorge Brandão	4–5
KTM	450 Rally Replica	(Portugal) Old Friends Rally Team	(Portugal) Pedro Pinheiro	4
KTM	450 Rally Replica	(Portugal) Old Friends Rally Team	(Portugal) Nuno Silva	4–5
KTM	450 Rally Replica	(Lithuania) Ringfreaks	(Lithuania) Ignas Daunoravičius	4–5
KTM	450 Rally Replica	(France) Team Universal Ride	(France) Jérôme Bas	5
KTM	450 Rally Replica	(Slovakia) Slovnaft Rally Team	(Slovakia) Marek Vierik	5
KTM	450 Rally Replica	(Italy) Budino Racing	(Italy) Luca Corradini	5
KTM	450 Rally Replica	(United Kingdom) Happy Rally	(United Kingdom) Jack Fielder	5
Rieju	450 Rally Replica	(Spain) Rieju - Pedrega Team	(Spain) Marc Calmet	1
Rieju	450 Rally Replica	(Spain) Rieju - Pedrega Team	(Spain) Josep Pedro Subirats	1
Rieju	450 Rally Replica	(Spain) Rieju - Pedrega Team	(Spain) August Castellá	5
Sherco	450 SEF Rally	(France) Sherco Rally Factory	(India) Harith Noah	1, 3–5
Yamaha	WR450F		(France) Florian Bancilhon	3
Yamaha	WR450F	(France) Chicken Racing Team	(France) Stéphane Poulet	5
Rally3 Teams & Riders
Constructor	Vehicle	Team	Rider	Rounds
Beta	RR 430	(France) Aubmoto	(France) Thomas Zoldos	4–5
Beta	RR 430	(France) Aubmoto	(France) Stéphane Joly	5
Honda	CRF450RX	(Portugal) Wingmotor	(Portugal) Gonçalo Amaral	4
Honda	CRF450RX	(Portugal) Wingmotor	(Portugal) Salvador Amaral	4
Honda	CRF450RX	(Italy) RS Moto	(Italy) Carlo Cabini	4–5
Husqvarna	FE 450	(Finland) Desert Fox Rally Project	(Finland) Ralf Molander	4
KTM	450 EXC-F	(Spain) Xraid Experience	(Argentina) Eduardo Alan	4–5
KTM	450 EXC-F	(Spain) Xraid Experience	(Chile) John Medina	4
KTM	450 EXC-F	(France) Nomade Racing	(France) Noa Sainct	5
KTM	450 EXC-F	(Spain) Pedregà Team	(Ecuador) Mauricio Cueva	5
KTM	450 EXC-F	(Spain) Pedregà Team	(Hungary) Richárd Hodola	5
KTM	450 EXC-F	(Morocco) FRMM	(Morocco) Achraf Zoulati	5
Quad Teams & Riders
Constructor	Vehicle	Team	Rider	Rounds
CFMoto	CForce 1000	(Lithuania) CFMoto Thunder Racing	(France) Gaëtan Martinez	2–4
CFMoto	CForce 1000	(Lithuania) CFMoto Thunder Racing	(Lithuania) Antanas Kanopkinas	2–4
Yamaha	700 Raptor	(Poland) SQGP Racing Team	(Poland) Marcin Wilkolek	2
Yamaha	700 Raptor	Poland National Team	(Poland) Marek Loj	2–4
Yamaha	700 Raptor		(United Arab Emirates) Abdulaziz Ahli	2
Yamaha	700 Raptor		(South Africa) Carien Teessen	3
Yamaha	700 Raptor	(France) Team Drag'On Distribution	(France) Alexis Varagne	4

=== RallyGP Riders' & Manufacturers' championships ===
Pos.	Rider	DAK (Saudi Arabia)	ABU (United Arab Emirates)	ZAF (South Africa)	PRT (Portugal)	MOR (Morocco)	Points
1	(Australia) Daniel Sanders	1	1	1	1	2	133
2	(Spain) Tosha Schareina	2	3	Ret	2	1	91
3	(United States) Ricky Brabec	5	2	3	4	3	82
4	(Argentina) Luciano Benavides	4	4	2	3	Ret	69
5	(France) Adrien Van Beveren	3	5	4	Ret	4	61
6	(Chile) José Ignacio Cornejo	7	6	6	7	5	55
7	(United States) Skyler Howes	6	7	5	5	Ret	46
8	(South Africa) Bradley Cox	Ret		7	8	7	28
9	(Botswana) Ross Branch	Ret	Ret	8	Ret	9	17
	(Chile) Pablo Quintanilla	Ret					0
	(Argentina) Kevin Benavides	Ret					0
	(Germany) Sebastian Bühler	Ret					0
Riders ineligible for championship points
	(Spain) Lorenzo Santolino	10			6	6	
	(Slovakia) Štefan Svitko	8				8	
	(Portugal) Rui Gonçalves	9					
	(South Africa) Aaron Mare	Ret					
	(Bolivia) Daniel Nosiglia	Ret					
	(United States) Mason Klein	Ret					
	(Portugal) Antonio Maio	Ret					
	(Czech Republic) Martin Michek	Ret					
	(United Arab Emirates) Mohammed Al-Balooshi	Ret					
Pos.	Rider	DAK (Saudi Arabia)	ABU (United Arab Emirates)	ZAF (South Africa)	PRT (Portugal)	MOR (Morocco)	Points

Pos.	Manufacturer	DAK (Saudi Arabia)	ABU (United Arab Emirates)	ZAF (South Africa)	PRT (Portugal)	MOR (Morocco)	Points
1	(Austria) KTM	58	38	45	41	20	202
2	(Japan) Honda	54	36	29	33	41	193
3	(India) Hero	14	10	18	10	20	72
Pos.	Manufacturer	DAK (Saudi Arabia)	ABU (United Arab Emirates)	ZAF (South Africa)	PRT (Portugal)	MOR (Morocco)	Points

=== Rally2 Riders' & Teams' championships ===
Pos.	Rider	DAK (Saudi Arabia)	ABU (United Arab Emirates)	ZAF (South Africa)	PRT (Portugal)	MOR (Morocco)	Points
1	(Spain) Edgar Canet	1	Ret	1	1	1	113
2	(Austria) Tobias Ebster	2	3	2	25	4	79
3	(South Africa) Michael Docherty	5	1	3	3	2	78
4	(Poland) Konrad Dąbrowski	7	2	5	6	3	61
5	(Chile) Ruy Barbosa		4	4		7	35
6	(France) Neels Theric	6				5	26
7	(France) Romain Dumontier	3					24
8	(Portugal) Bruno Santos	35			2	17	23
9	(United States) Preston Campbell				4	6	23
10	(Slovenia) Toni Mulec	4					20
11	(Portugal) Martim Ventura		5		9	19	19
12	(Spain) Alfredo Pellicer				5	9	18
13	(Mongolia) Khaliunbold Erdenebileg		7			8	17
14	(India) Harith Noah	Ret		Ret	7	10	15
15	(Chile) Andro Korlaet		6			13	13
16	(Czech Republic) Dušan Drdaj	8					12
17	(Australia) Toby Hederics	9					11
18	(France) Florian Bancilhon			6			10
19	(South Africa) Dwain Barnard	38		8			10
20	(Argentina) Juan Santiago Rostan	30		9		32	10
21	(Romania) Emanuel Gyenes	10				15	10
22	(France) Benjamin Melot	11				14	10
23	(South Africa) Mauritz Meiring			7			9
24	(Spain) Arnau Lledó				8	20	9
25	(United Arab Emirates) Hamdan Al-Ali		8				8
26	(Czech Republic) David Pabiska	26			11	33	8
27	(United Kingdom) Thomas Childs		9				7
28	(Poland) Filip Grot			10			6
29	(Italy) Mattia Riva		10				6
30	(Netherlands) Joël van Mechelen				10		6
31	(United States) Jacob Argubright	12					6
32	(Italy) Paolo Lucci	73				12	6
33	(Czech Republic) Milan Engel	13				21	6
34	(France) Matthieu Jauffraud			11			5
35	(Germany) Markus Hertlein		11				5
36	(Lithuania) Dovydas Karka					11	5
37	(Portugal) Pedro Pinheiro		Ret	15	13	41	5
38	(India) Abdul Wahid		12				4
39	(South Africa) Anthony Raynard			12			4
40	(Portugal) Jorge Brandão^{†}				12	Ret^{†}	4
41	(France) Marshall Meplon	37			14		4
42	(Argentina) Sebastian Urquia		31	17	16	43	4
43	(Germany) Justin Gerlach	64	21		20		4
44	(Australia) Martin Chalmers		13				3
45	(Italy) Massimo Camurri			13			3
46	(Czech Republic) Jaromir Romancik	14					3
47	(Netherlands) Ian Olthof			14		35	3
48	(Belgium) Jérôme Martiny	16				16	3
49	(India) Jatin Jain	Ret	Ret	23	24	73	3
50	(Italy) Tommaso Montanari	25				22	3
51	(China) Sunier Sunier	27				31	3
52	(Chile) Tomas De Gavardo	31				25	3
53	(Czech Republic) Jiri Broz	70				37	3
54	(Lithuania) Edvard Sokolovskij		14				2
55	(France) Charlie Herbst	15					2
56	(Australia) David Brock		16		17		2
57	(France) Jeremy Miroir	17					2
58	(Argentina) Leonardo Cola		17			38	2
59	(France) Xavier Flick	18					2
60	(Lithuania) Nerimantas Jucius	19					2
61	(Czech Republic) Jan Brabec	20					2
62	(Germany) Mike Wiedemann	21					2
63	(Italy) Fabio Bernardini				21	54	2
64	(Spain) Joan Vinals		30		22		2
65	(Lithuania) Arūnas Gelažninkas	22					2
66	(France) Julien Dalbec	23					2
67	(Spain) Javi Vega	24					2
68	(China) Fang Xiangliang	28					2
69	(France) Jeremie Gerber	29					2
70	(Italy) Andrea Winkler	32					2
71	(Spain) Sandra Gómez	33					2
72	(Czech Republic) Adam Peschel	34					2
73	(Italy) Tiziano Interno	36					2
74	(Poland) Bartlomiej Tabin	39					2
75	(Spain) Iñigo Zardoya		25			39	2
76	(Colombia) Francisco Álvarez	40					2
77	(France) Guillaume Chollet	41					2
78	(Lithuania) Modestas Siliūnas	42					2
79	(Greece) Vasileios Boudros	43					2
80	(France) Philippe Gendron	44					2
81	(France) Clément Artaud	45					2
82	(Denmark) Thomas Kongshoj	46					2
83	(Uruguay) Alvaro Coppola	47					2
84	(Lithuania) Ignas Daunoravičius				19	47	2
85	(France) Benjamin Bourdariat	48					2
86	(France) Fabien Domas	49					2
87	(France) Max Bianucci	50					2
88	(Italy) Manuel Lucchese	51					2
89	(France) Maxime Pouponnot	52					2
90	(China) Zhang Min	53					2
91	(Spain) Ricardo Lastra		29			53	2
92	(France) David Casteu	54					2
93	(China) Zhao Hongyi	55					2
94	(Portugal) Gad Nachmani	56					2
95	(Canada) Jordan Strachan	57					2
96	(Lebanon) Rafic Eid	58					2
97	(Spain) Oscar Hernandez	59					2
98	(Portugal) Nuno Silva				18	59	2
99	(Norway) Axel Mustad	60					2
100	(Guatemala) Francisco Arredondo	61					2
101	(France) Damien Bataller	62					2
102	(Lithuania) Mykolas Paulavičius	63					2
103	(France) Jean-Philippe Révolte	65					2
104	(Mongolia) Murun Purevdorj	66					2
105	(France) Jim Moisa	67					2
106	(Italy) Ottavio Missoni	68					2
107	(Czech Republic) Martin Prokes	69					2
108	(France) Benjamin Pousset			20		69	2
109	(Spain) Ignacio Sanchis	71					2
110	(South Africa) Willem Avenant	72					2
111	(United Kingdom) Robbie Wallace	74					2
112	(Spain) Marc Calmet	75					2
113	(France) Mathieu Doveze	76				Ret	2
114	(United Kingdom) James Hillier	77					2
115	(Slovenia) Simon Marcic	78					2
116	(Saudi Arabia) Ahmed Aljaber	79					2
117	(Netherlands) Kees Koolen		15				1
118	(Belgium) Mathieu Liebaert				15		1
119	(Chile) John Medina			16			1
120	(Poland) Robert Przybylowski		18				1
121	(United States) Nathan Rafferty			18			1
122	(Argentina) Jeremías Pascual				Ret	18	1
123	(Spain) Dominique Cizeau			19			1
124	(Paraguay) Blas Zapag		19				1
125	(Italy) Massimiliano Guerrini		20				1
126	(Belgium) Xavier Gregoire			21			1
127	(South Africa) Martin Lourens			22			1
128	(United Kingdom) Jason Joslin		22				1
129	(United Kingdom) Carl Searles		23				1
130	(Croatia) Srdan Jablan				23		1
131	(Spain) Alonso Trigo					23	1
132	(United Kingdom) Craig Searles		24				1
133	(South Africa) Alex Torrao			24			1
134	(France) Mathieu Girard					24	1
135	(Argentina) Gustavo Milutin			25			1
136	(France) Ludvig Messager		26				1
137	(India) Aishwarya Pissay				26	Ret	1
138	(India) Yugandhar Prasad Jasti			26			1
139	(United States) Brandon Krause					26	1
140	(France) Alessandri Mendoza		27				1
141	(France) Jérôme Bas					27	1
142	(Mexico) Roberto Mariscal		28				1
143	(France) Nicolas Horeaux					28	1
144	(Italy) Andrea Gava					29	1
145	(Japan) Shinya Fujiwara					30	1
146	(Germany) Tony Schattat		32				1
147	(Argentina) Eduardo Alan		33				1
148	(Argentina) Baltazar Frezze					34	1
149	(Slovakia) Marek Vierik					36	1
150	(France) Pierre Peyrard					40	1
151	(France) Guillaume Hucher					42	1
152	(France) Thibault Boucherot					44	1
153	(Ukraine) Andriy Polyukhin					45	1
154	(France) Julien Regent					46	1
155	(Switzerland) Dennis Mildenberger	Ret				48	1
156	(France) Benjamin Georjon					49	1
157	(Spain) Joan Carles Guillén					50	1
158	(France) Charles Pick					51	1
159	(France) Wilfried Dagommer					52	1
160	(France) Loïc Teinturier					55	1
161	(France) Paul Roux dit Buisson					56	1
162	(Kenya) Gavin Mouritzen					57	1
163	(Italy) Luca Corradini					58	1
164	(Netherlands) Deen Munsters					60	1
165	(Mexico) Adolfo Alonso					61	1
166	(Italy) Pierpaolo Vivaldi					62	1
167	(Spain) José Vicente Fernandez					63	1
168	(France) Johan Wang-Chang					64	1
169	(France) Damien Gueno					65	1
170	(France) Stéphane Poulet					66	1
171	(Mexico) Armando Alonso					67	1
172	(France) Benjamin Perinet					68	1
173	(Chile) Gabriel Balut					70	1
174	(United Kingdom) Jack Fielder					71	1
175	(Republic of Ireland) Gary Ennis					72	1
176	(France) Pierre Lerosier					74	1
177	(Italy) Federico Ghiringhelli					75	1
	(Saudi Arabia) Badr Alhamdan	Ret	Ret				0
	(France) Mathieu Feuvrier	Ret				Ret	0
	(South Africa) Martin Camp			Ret		Ret	0
	(Italy) Cesare Zacchetti	Ret					0
	(Saudi Arabia) Abdulhalim Almogheera	Ret					0
	(Ecuador) Juan Puga	Ret					0
	(Lebanon) Ehab Al Hakeem	Ret					0
	(Spain) Eduardo Iglesias	Ret					0
	(France) Michael Jacobi	Ret					0
	(Ecuador) Carlos Malo	Ret					0
	(Australia) Andrew Houlihan	Ret					0
	(France) Arnaud Domet	Ret					0
	(India) Ashish Raorane	Ret					0
	(Spain) Josep Pedro Subirats	Ret					0
	(Saudi Arabia) Mishal Alghuneim	Ret					0
	(Italy) Iader Giraldi	Ret					0
	(France) Thomas Georgin	Ret					0
	(Spain) Ivan Merichal	Ret					0
	(France) Bertrand Domet	Ret					0
	(Switzerland) Alexandre Vaudan	Ret					0
	(China) Deng Liansong	Ret					0
	(Lithuania) Gediminas Šatkus	Ret					0
	(France) Alexandre Yon	Ret					0
	(Spain) Ferran Zaragoza	Ret					0
	(Switzerland) Yann Di Mauro	Ret					0
	(Spain) Rachid Al-Lal	Ret					0
	(Uruguay) Fabian Von Thuengen	Ret					0
	(Spain) Gines Belzunces	Ret					0
	(Bahrain) Salman Farhan	Ret					0
	(France) Stéphane Darques	Ret					0
	(Italy) Lorenzo Maestrami	Ret					0
	(Spain) Juanjo Martínez	Ret					0
	(India) Rajendra Revallar		Ret				0
	(Germany) Philip Horlemann		Ret				0
	(United Arab Emirates) Abdulla Lanjawi		Ret				0
	(United Kingdom) Alex McInnes		Ret				0
	(Poland) Marcin Talaga		Ret				0
	(Spain) Martí Escofet				Ret		0
	(France) Adrien Costes					Ret	0
	(France) Matthieu Cauvin					Ret	0
	(France) Guillaume Jaunin					Ret	0
	(Spain) Guillem Martinez					Ret	0
	(Italy) Alessandro Rigoni					Ret	0
	(France) Guillaume Rosier					Ret	0
	(France) Guillaume Martin					Ret	0
	(France) Clément Dumais					Ret	0
	(Spain) August Castellá					Ret	0
	(Czech Republic) Libor Pletka					Ret	0
	(Czech Republic) Martin Brabec					Ret	0
	(Australia) Darren Goodman					Ret	0
	(Spain) José Flores					Ret	0
	(France) Olivier Lete					Ret	0
	(Costa Rica) José Daniel Miranda					Ret	0
	(France) Steve Pasco					Ret	0
	(France) Eddy Pasco					Ret	0
Pos.	Rider	DAK (Saudi Arabia)	ABU (United Arab Emirates)	ZAF (South Africa)	PRT (Portugal)	MOR (Morocco)	Points

Pos.	Team	DAK (Saudi Arabia)	ABU (United Arab Emirates)	ZAF (South Africa)	PRT (Portugal)	MOR (Morocco)	Points
1	(Netherlands) BAS World KTM Team	50		27	22	28	127
2	(Spain) Xraids Experience	4	23	20	12	10	65
3	(United Arab Emirates) SRG Motorsports		41				41
4	(Netherlands) HT Rally Raid	4	14	5		14	37
5	(Poland) DUUST Rally Team	16	21				37
6	(Japan) Honda HRC				20	11	31
7	(China) Kove Factory Racing					12	12
8	(Spain) Joyride Race Service	4	2		2	2	10
9	(France) Nomade Racing	4				2	6
10	(Spain) Pedrega Team	4				2	6
11	(Italy) Fantic Motor Rally Team	4					4
12	(Switzerland) Nomadas Adventure	2	2				4
13	(China) Supesunr Kove Team	2					2
14	(Lithuania) AG Dakar School	2					2
15	(France) Team Casteu Trophy	2					2
Pos.	Team	DAK (Saudi Arabia)	ABU (United Arab Emirates)	ZAF (South Africa)	PRT (Portugal)	MOR (Morocco)	Points

=== Rally3 Riders' championship ===
Pos.	Rider	PRT (Portugal)	MOR (Morocco)	Points
1	(France) Thomas Zoldos	1	2	45
2	(Italy) Carlo Cabini	2	3	36
3	(France) Noa Sainct		1	25
4	(Argentina) Eduardo Alan	4	5	24
5	(Finland) Ralf Molander	3		16
6	(Morocco) Achraf Zoulati		4	13
7	(Portugal) Gonçalo Amaral	5		11
8	(Portugal) Salvador Amaral	6		10
9	(Hungary) Richárd Hodola		6	10
10	(France) Stéphane Joly		7	9
	(Chile) John Medina	Ret		0
	(Ecuador) Mauricio Cueva		Ret	0
Pos.	Rider	PRT (Portugal)	MOR (Morocco)	Points

=== Quad Riders' championship ===
Pos.	Rider	ABU (United Arab Emirates)	ZAF (South Africa)	PRT (Portugal)	Points
1	(France) Gaëtan Martinez	2	1	1	70
2	(Lithuania) Antanas Kanopkinas	1	2	2	65
3	(Poland) Marek Loj	3	Ret	Ret	16
4	(France) Alexis Varagne			3	16
5	(Poland) Marcin Wilkolek	4			13
	(South Africa) Carien Teessen		3		0
	(United Arab Emirates) Abdulaziz Ahli	Ret			0
Pos.	Rider	ABU (United Arab Emirates)	ZAF (South Africa)	PRT (Portugal)	Points

=== Women's Trophy championship ===
Pos.	Rider	DAK (Saudi Arabia)	ABU (United Arab Emirates)	ZAF (South Africa)	PRT (Portugal)	MOR (Morocco)	Points
1	(Spain) Sandra Gómez	1					38
2	(India) Aishwarya Pissay				1	Ret	25
Pos.	Rider	DAK (Saudi Arabia)	ABU (United Arab Emirates)	ZAF (South Africa)	PRT (Portugal)	MOR (Morocco)	Points

=== Rally2 Junior Trophy championship ===
Pos.	Rider	DAK (Saudi Arabia)	ABU (United Arab Emirates)	ZAF (South Africa)	PRT (Portugal)	MOR (Morocco)	Points
1	(Spain) Edgar Canet	1	Ret	1	1	1	113
2	(Poland) Konrad Dąbrowski	2	1	2	3	2	95
3	(Germany) Justin Gerlach	4	3		6		46
4	(Portugal) Martim Ventura		2		5	5	42
5	(Spain) Alfredo Pellicer				2	3	36
6	(China) Fang Xiangliang	3					24
7	(Spain) Arnau Lledó				4	6	23
8	(Poland) Filip Grot			3			16
9	(Argentina) Jeremías Pascual				Ret	4	13
10	(Argentina) Baltazar Frezze					7	9
11	(Slovakia) Marek Vierik					8	8
	(United Kingdom) Alex McInnes		Ret				0
	(Spain) Martí Escofet				Ret		0
	(France) Adrien Costes					Ret	0
Pos.	Rider	DAK (Saudi Arabia)	ABU (United Arab Emirates)	ZAF (South Africa)	PRT (Portugal)	MOR (Morocco)	Points

=== Senior Trophy championship ===
Pos.	Rider	DAK (Saudi Arabia)	ABU (United Arab Emirates)	ZAF (South Africa)	PRT (Portugal)	MOR (Morocco)	Points
1	(Czech Republic) David Pabiska	1			1	1	88
2	(Argentina) Sebastian Urquia		6	1	3	2	71
3	(Australia) David Brock		2		4		33
4	(Poland) Bartlomiej Tabin	2					30
5	(Netherlands) Kees Koolen		1				25
6	(India) Jatin Jain	Ret	Ret	6	6	11	25
7	(France) Philippe Gendron	3					24
8	(Spain) Ricardo Lastra		5			4	24
9	(Portugal) Nuno Silva				5	6	21
10	(Portugal) Jorge Brandão^{†}				2	Ret^{†}	20
11	(United States) Nathan Rafferty			2			20
12	(Uruguay) Alvaro Coppola	4					20
13	(France) Fabien Domas	5					17
14	(Poland) Robert Przybylowski		3				16
15	(Spain) Dominique Cizeau			3			16
16	(Switzerland) Dennis Mildenberger	Ret				3	16
17	(China) Zhang Min	6					15
18	(France) David Casteu	7					14
19	(Italy) Massimiliano Guerrini		4				13
20	(Belgium) Xavier Gregoire			4			13
21	(Portugal) Gad Nachmani	8					12
22	(South Africa) Martin Lourens			5			11
23	(Kenya) Gavin Mouritzen					5	11
24	(Lebanon) Rafic Eid	9					11
25	(India) Yugandhar Prasad Jasti			7			9
26	(Spain) Oscar Hernandez	10					9
27	(Italy) Pierpaolo Vivaldi					7	9
28	(Guatemala) Francisco Arredondo	11					8
29	(France) Stéphane Poulet					8	8
30	(France) Benjamin Perinet					9	7
31	(Spain) Ignacio Sanchis	12					6
32	(Republic of Ireland) Gary Ennis					10	6
33	(France) Pierre Lerosier					12	4
34	(Italy) Federico Ghiringhelli					13	3
	(South Africa) Martin Camp			Ret		Ret	0
	(Spain) Eduardo Iglesias	Ret					0
	(Spain) Rachid Al-Lal	Ret					0
	(Australia) Andrew Houlihan	Ret					0
	(France) Stéphane Darques	Ret					0
	(Italy) Lorenzo Maestrami	Ret					0
	(Italy) Cesare Zacchetti	Ret					0
	(Italy) Iader Giraldi	Ret					0
	(Ecuador) Carlos Malo	Ret					0
	(France) Olivier Lete					Ret	0
	(Italy) Alessandro Rigoni					Ret	0
	(France) Guillaume Jaunin					Ret	0
	(Australia) Darren Goodman					Ret	0
	(France) Guillaume Rosier					Ret	0
Pos.	Rider	DAK (Saudi Arabia)	ABU (United Arab Emirates)	ZAF (South Africa)	PRT (Portugal)	MOR (Morocco)	Points
