= Paulavičius =

- Lithuanian surname
- m.: Paulavičius
- f.: (unmarried): Paulavičiūtė
- f.: (married): Paulavičienė
- Related names: Pawłowicz

Paulavičius is a Lithuanian surname.

- Algirdas Paulavičius (actor) (1943—2020), Lithuanian actor
- Algirdas Paulavičius (musician) (1945—2007), Russian conductor, composer, music teacher and multi-instrumentalist
- Jonas Paulavičius
- Mykolas Paulavičius, Lithuanian professional motorcycle racer
