= Pawłowicz =

Pawlowicz is a Polish-language East Slavic patronymic surname, to be distinguisled from the East Slavic patronymic Pawlowicz/Pavlovich. Lithuanized form: Paulavičius

- Bohdan Pawłowicz
- Leonor Beatriz Diskin Pawlowicz or Lia Diskin
- Zygmunt Pawłowicz
