= Aishwarya Pissay =

Motorsports World Cup winner from India

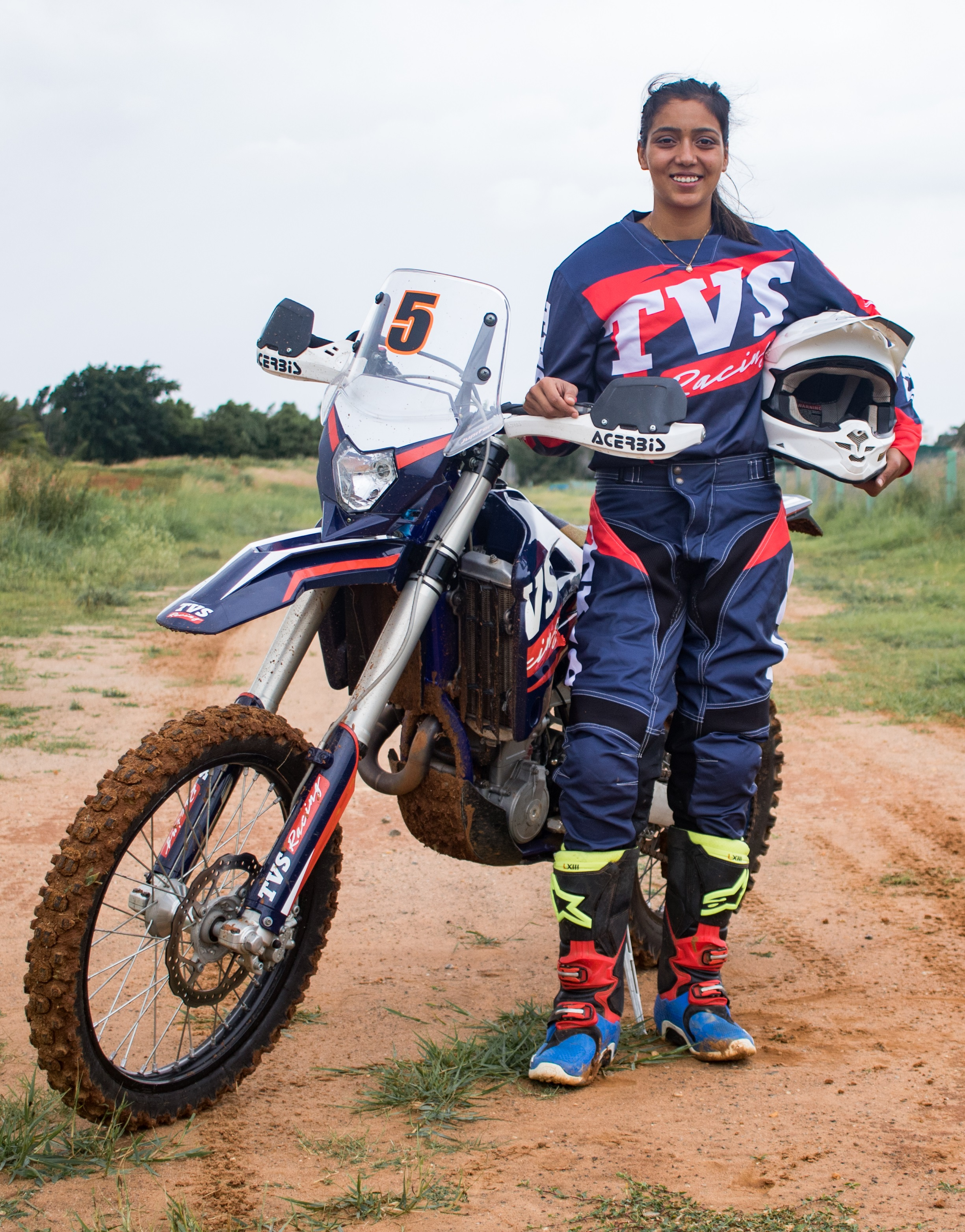

Personal information
- Born: 14 August 1995 (age 31) Bangalore, Karnataka, India

Sport
- Country: India
- Event: Circuit Racing/Off Road Racing/Rally

Aishwarya Pissay (born 14 August 1995) is an Indian motorsports athlete from Karnataka, India. She is a circuit and off-road motorcycle racer who became the first-ever Indian motorsports athlete to win a world title. The TVS prodigy participated at the FIM Bajas World Cup and secured the 1st place in the women's category and 2nd in the junior's category in 2019. She is the first Indian woman to win seven FMSCI National titles, including 6 consecutive Indian National Rally Championship in two-wheelers from 2017. She started with Circuit Racing winning Honda one-make and TVS one-make titles and went on to win multiple Indian National Rally Championship (INRC - 2w) titles before moving to bigger cross-country rallies.

She found her passion in racing as she turned 18, while taking small road trips around her home town of Bengaluru, consequently learning how to master the art of riding a bike. This hobby grew into a profession as she won National titles in both Road Racing and Rally Championships. She won INRC consecutively from 2017 to 2022. She also became the first Indian woman to compete in the Baja Aragon World Rally in Spain held in 2018.

== Domestic career ==
=== 2016 ===
Aishwarya graduated from Apex Racing Academy and won the Honda One Make Championship. She secured 5th position in the Dakshin Dare and 2nd place in the Asia Road Racing cup. She also went on to win the last round of the 2016 Indian National Rally Championship. She also won the CEAT Sprint Rally and graduated from the Apex Racing Academy in 2016, one of the first academies in India.

=== 2017 ===
In 2017, Aishwarya took a big step towards a professional career in motorsports by attending the California Superbike School. She won the Indian National Road Racing Championship and the Indian National Rally Championship in the same year, her first two National titles. Aishwarya secured 3rd place in Dakshin Dare Group - B and finished 4th in the Raid De Himalaya and was the only female rider to complete the course in the “Xtreme” category. Aishwarya also won the TVS one-make Road Racing title in 2017. TVS Racing signed Aishwarya Pissay on board as a factory racer in the same year.

=== 2018 ===
In 2018, she won the Indian National Rally Championship.

== International career ==
She competed in the Baja Aragon rally, where she crashed on the final day of the event forcing her to retire from the event.

The TVS Racing team's rider participated at the FIM Bajas World Cup and secured the 1st place in the women's category and 2nd in the junior's category in 2019. Thus, she became the first Indian motorsports athlete to win a medal at the world stage.

== Awards ==
Aishwarya received the TiE Young Achiever of the Year award in 2016 and also received the Outstanding Women in Motorsports Award by FMSCI in 2016. She received the Outstanding Women in Motorsports Award by FMSCI for the 2nd consecutive year in 2017 and also the Sports Women of the Year Award by Autotrack Magazine.
