= Dennis Murphy (motorcyclist) =

Personal information
- Full name: Dennis Murphy
- Born: 6 August 1974 South Africa

Cycling career
- Sport: Cycling
- Role: Toyota Desert race Navigator

Dennis Murphy is a South African motor sport cyclist and off-road car navigator.

== Early life ==
Murphy started the love for off-road at 15 years back in 1989, and has since been active throughout.

== Racing career ==
Murphy raced in a number of Dakar rallies as navigator, in 2017 driving with Giniel de Villiers. With de Villiers, he won the 2017 Kalahari Botswana 1000 Desert Race.

Murphy was named Donaldson Champion Cross Country Co-Driver in 2013. and 2014.
