= Mykolas Paulavičius =

Lithuanian professional motorcycle racer

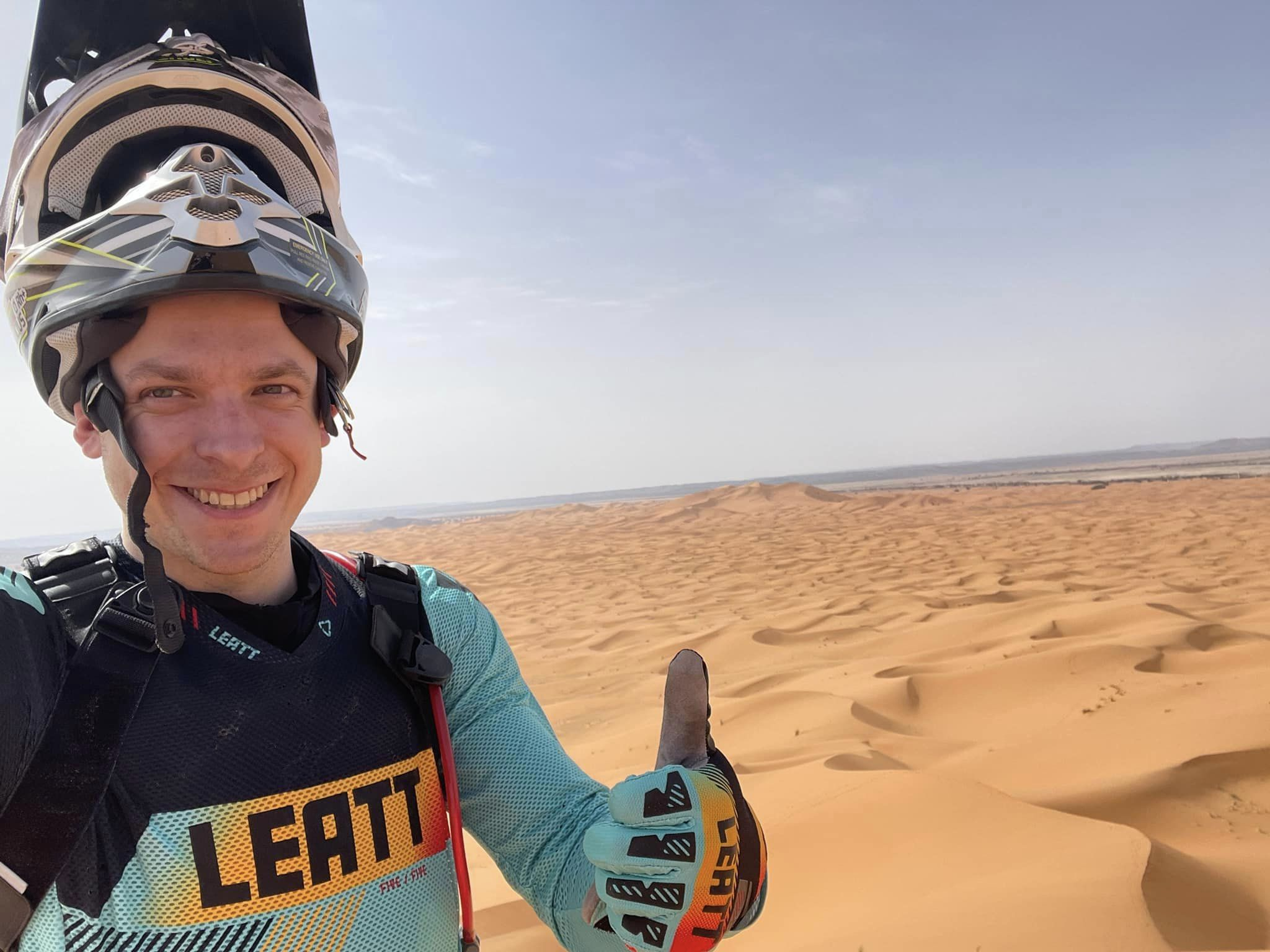
- Nationality: Lithuania
- Born: 18 February 1991 (age 35); Vilnius, Lithuania
- Current team: Mykolas Paulavičius Dakar Team
- Bike number: 119
- Website: mpdakar.lt

Mykolas Paulavičius (born 18 February 1991 in Vilnius) is a Lithuanian professional motorcycle racer. He is a three-time Lithuanian Enduro champion, a multiple-time Baltic prize-winner, and a participant in the World Extreme Enduro and Rally Raid Championships, as well as the Dakar Rally.

== Professional career ==
From 2007 to 2009, Paulavičius trained and competed with members of the largest Enduro club in Lithuania. It was there that he began his Enduro cross career, and in 2010, he became the Lithuanian Enduro Cross Champion in the beginner class.

In the summer of 2024, Paulavičius received an invitation to compete in the 2025 Dakar Rally.

In 2025, Paulavičius took part in the Dakar Rally for the first time and successfully completed the race.

== Rally participation ==
In 2022, Paulavičius rode his KTM Rally Replica 450 motorcycle to a 6th-place finish at the Fenix Rally Raid in Tunisia, Africa.

That same year, Paulavičius joined the Mediafon Team at the Dakar Rally, working as a mechanic.

In 2023 he made his debut in the World Rally-Raid Championship at the Rallye du Maroc, finishing 38th in the motorcycle category. He earned the 15 points required to qualify for future Dakar Rallies – 12 points after the official finish, and an additional three points awarded following an error recognized by the officials.

In 2024, Paulavičius competed in the Abu Dhabi Desert Challenge, part of the World Rally-Raid Championship, where he achieved his best international result to date: 18th overall in the motorcycle standings, 15th in the Rally2 class, and 12 more points toward his 2025 Dakar Rally invitation. This result marked the best performance by a Lithuanian athlete in the championship's history.

In 2025, Paulavičius competed in his first Dakar Rally, successfully completing the full distance. He finished 73rd overall, 63rd in the Rally2 class, and 16th in the Rookie classification.

== Career achievements ==
=== 2025 ===
- Dakar Rally – 73rd place (Overall), 63rd place (Rally2 Class), 16th place (Rookie Challenge, Rally2 Class)

=== 2024 ===
- Classic Elektrėnai Rally – Co-driver, 1st place (SSV Class)
- Baja Poland (FIA World Championship) – Participant, Co-driver (SSV Class)
- Breslau Rally (SSV) – Co-driver, 12th place (SSV Class)
- Abu Dhabi Desert Challenge (World Championship) – 18th place (Moto Class), 15th place (Rally2 Class)

=== 2023 ===
- Rallye du Maroc (World Championship) – 38th place (Moto Class)
- Perimetras (Lithuanian Rally Raid Championship) – National Champion (Moto Class)

=== 2022 ===
- Fenix Rally Raid – 6th place (Moto Class)
- Dakar Rally (Mediafon Team) – Mechanic for SSV Class team (15th place overall)

=== 2021 ===
- Sea to Sky – 18th place (Silver Class)
- Pabradė Rally – 2nd / 3rd place
- World SuperEnduro Series (Hero Race) – 20th place (Expert Class)
- Extreme Charge – 5th place (Gold Class)
- Rocket Biker – 2nd place (Pro Class)
- Hard Enduro Arsenal – 39th place (Expert Class)
- Rocket Biker – 6th place (Pro Class)

=== 2020 ===
- Quarantine training in the Carpathian Mountains, Romania

=== 2019 ===
- Erzberg Rodeo – 375th place out of 2,250 participants
- Red Bull Romaniacs – 7th place (Silver Class)
- Sea to Sky – Mechanic and assistant for LV/EST team
- Sea to Sky – Mechanic and assistant for LV/EST team (winners of 2 silver medals)

=== 2018 ===
- Erzberg Rodeo – 604th place out of 1,850 participants
- Red Bull Romaniacs – 7th place (Bronze Class)
- Red Bull Megawatt – 122nd place
- Lithuanian Enduro Sprint Vice-Champion (E2 Class)

=== 2017 ===
- Red Bull Megawatt – 190th place out of 1,500 participants
- Lithuanian Enduro Champion (E2 Class)
- Lithuanian Enduro Sprint Champion (E2 Class)

=== 2016 ===
- Lithuanian Enduro Sprint Vice-Champion (E2 Class)
- Urmas Urban Extreme Enduro – Vice-Champion

=== 2010 ===
- Lithuanian Enduro Cross Champion (C Class)

== Rally raid highlights ==
Rally	Year	Motorcycle	Place
Dakar 2025	2025	Rally Replica 450 2024	73 (63)
Abu Dhabi Desert Challenge	2024	Rally Replica 450 2023	18 (15)
Ralye du Maroc	2023	Rally Replica 450 2022	38
Lietuvos rally raid Perimetras	2023	Rally Replica 450 2015	1
Fenix rally	2022	Rally Replica 450 2015	6
