= 2026 World Rally-Raid Championship =

Rally raid competition season

2026 World Rally-Raid Championship
Previous:	2025	Next:	2027

The 2026 World Rally-Raid Championship is the fifth season of the annual competition for rally raid events sanctioned by both the FIA and FIM.

Lucas Moraes starts the season as the reigning FIA drivers champion, whilst Daniel Sanders is the reigning FIM riders champion.

A new 'Stock' category has been introduced within the FIA classes for 2026.

== Calendar ==
The calendar for the 2026 season features five rally-raid events. Like in the previous seasons, the Dakar Rally once again hosts the opening event, while the Desafío Ruta 40 returns to the calendar, replacing South Africa Safari Rally.

Round	Dates	Rally name	Format	Report
1	3–17 January	(Saudi Arabia) Dakar Rally	Marathon	Report
2	17–22 March	BP Ultimate Rally-Raid Portugal	Rally	Report
3	24–29 May	(Argentina) Desafío Ruta 40	Rally	Report
4	28 September–3 October	(Morocco) Rallye du Maroc	Rally	Report
5	22–27 November	(United Arab Emirates) Abu Dhabi Desert Challenge	Rally	Report

== FIA World Rally-Raid Championship ==
- Entrants competing in the Ultimate, Stock, Challenger, and SSV classes are eligible for the overall World Championship.

=== Entry list ===
Ultimate Teams & Drivers
Constructor	Vehicle	Team	Driver	Co-driver	Rounds
Century	CR7	(South Africa) Century Racing Factory Team	(France) Mathieu Serradori	(France) Loïc Minaudier	1–2, 4
Century	CR7	(France) SRT Rally Team	(France) Lionel Baud	(France) Lucie Baud	4
Dacia	Sandrider	(France) The Dacia Sandriders	(Brazil) Lucas Moraes	(Germany) Dennis Zenz	1–3
Dacia	Sandrider	(France) The Dacia Sandriders	(Brazil) Lucas Moraes	(Spain) Pablo Moreno	4
Dacia	Sandrider	(France) The Dacia Sandriders	(Qatar) Nasser Al-Attiyah	(Belgium) Fabian Lurquin	1–4
Dacia	Sandrider	(France) The Dacia Sandriders	(France) Sébastien Loeb	(France) Édouard Boulanger	1–4
Dacia	Sandrider	(France) The Dacia Sandriders	(Spain) Cristina Gutiérrez	(Spain) Pablo Moreno	1
Ebro	S800 XRR	(Spain) Ebro Audax Motorsport	(Spain) Laia Sanz	(Italy) Maurizio Gerini	1–2, 4
Ford	Raptor	(United States) Ford Racing	(Spain) Carlos Sainz Sr.	(Spain) Lucas Cruz	1
Ford	Raptor	(United States) Ford Racing	(Spain) Carlos Sainz Sr.	(Spain) Daniel Oliveras	2–4
Ford	Raptor	(United States) Ford Racing	(Sweden) Mattias Ekström	(Sweden) Emil Bergkvist	1–2, 4
Ford	Raptor	(United States) Ford Racing	(Spain) Nani Roma	(Spain) Alex Haro	1, 3–4
Ford	Raptor	(United States) Ford Racing	(United States) Mitchell Guthrie	(United States) Kellon Walch	1, 3–4
Ford	Raptor	(United States) Ford Racing	(Kyrgyzstan) Denis Krotov	(Kyrgyzstan) Konstantin Zhiltsov	2
Ford	Raptor	(United Kingdom) M-Sport Rally Raid Team	(Kyrgyzstan) Denis Krotov	(Kyrgyzstan) Konstantin Zhiltsov	1, 3–4
Ford	Raptor	(United Kingdom) M-Sport Rally Raid Team	(Greece) Jourdan Serderidis	(Luxembourg) Grégoire Munster	1
Ford	Raptor	(United Kingdom) M-Sport Rally Raid Team	(Greece) Jourdan Serderidis	(Spain) Lucas Cruz	4
Ford	Raptor	(Czech Republic) Orlen Jipocar Team	(Czech Republic) Martin Prokop	(Czech Republic) Viktor Chytka	1–4
Ford	Raptor	(France) RD Limited	(France) Romain Dumas	(France) Alexandre Winocq	1
Ford	Raptor	(France) RD Limited	(France) Romain Dumas	(France) Anthony Pes	4
Ford	Raptor	(France) RD Limited	(Netherlands) Kees Koolen	(Netherlands) Wouter Rosegaar	2–4
Ford	Raptor	(Austria) MM Rallye	(Austria) Mark Mustermann	(Austria) Michael Zajc	2, 4
Ford	Raptor	(Poland) Energylandia Rally Team	(Poland) Eryk Goczał	(Poland) Szymon Gospodarczyk	4
Ford	Raptor	(Poland) Energylandia Rally Team	(Poland) Marek Goczał	(Poland) Maciej Marton	4
Ford	F150	(Czech Republic) Offroadsport	(Czech Republic) Miroslav Zapletal	(Slovakia) Marek Sýkora	1–2
Ford	Bronco Raptor	The Gear Shop Canada TM	(Canada) Nathan Hayashi	(Canada) Shane Hairsine	1
MD Rallye	Optimus	(France) JLC Racing	(France) Jean-Luc Ceccaldi	(France) Pascal Delacour	1
MD Rallye	Optimus	(France) JLC Racing	(France) Jean-Luc Ceccaldi	(France) Christophe Crespo	4
Mini	JCW Rally 3.0i	(Germany) X-Raid Mini JCW	(Belgium) Guillaume De Mévius	(France) Mathieu Baumel	1, 4
Mini	JCW Rally 3.0D	(Germany) X-Raid Mini JCW	(France) Lionel Baud	(France) Lucie Baud	1
Red-Lined	Revo T1+	(Czech Republic) Buggyra ZM Racing	(Seychelles) Aliyyah Koloc	(Poland) Marcin Pasek	1
Red-Lined	Revo T1+	(Czech Republic) Buggyra ZM Racing	(Czech Republic) Martin Koloc	(Italy) Mirko Brun	1
Toyota	Hilux	(Belgium) Overdrive Racing	(Saudi Arabia) Yazeed Al-Rajhi	(Germany) Timo Gottschalk	1–3
Toyota	Hilux	(Belgium) Overdrive Racing	(Saudi Arabia) Yazeed Al-Rajhi	(Germany) Dennis Zenz	4
Toyota	Hilux	(Belgium) Overdrive Racing	(Chile) Hernán Garcés	(Chile) Juan Pablo Latrach	1–4
Toyota	Hilux	(Belgium) Overdrive Racing	(Argentina) Kevin Benavides	(Argentina) Lisandro Sisterna	4
Toyota	Hilux	(Belgium) Overdrive Racing	(Saudi Arabia) Dania Akeel	(France) Séastien Delaunay	4
Toyota	Hilux	(Poland) Energylandia Rally Team	(Poland) Eryk Goczał	(Poland) Szymon Gospodarczyk	1–3
Toyota	Hilux	(Poland) Energylandia Rally Team	(Poland) Marek Goczał	(Poland) Maciej Marton	1–3
Toyota	Hilux	(Poland) Energylandia Rally Team	(Poland) Michał Goczał	(Spain) Diego Ortega	1
Toyota	Hilux	(Spain) Repsol Toyota Rally Team	(Spain) Isidre Esteve	(Spain) José Maria Villalobos	1, 4
Toyota	Hilux GR	(Japan) Toyota Gazoo Racing W2RC	(South Africa) Henk Lategan	(South Africa) Brett Cummings	1–4
Toyota	Hilux GR	(Japan) Toyota Gazoo Racing W2RC	(United States) Seth Quintero	(United States) Andrew Short	1–4
Toyota	Hilux GR	(Japan) Toyota Gazoo Racing W2RC	(Australia) Toby Price	(Spain) Armand Monleón	1
Toyota	Hilux GR	(Japan) Toyota Gazoo Racing W2RC	(Japan) Akira Miura	(Spain) Armand Monleón	2–4
Toyota	Hilux IMT EVO	(South Africa) Toyota Gazoo Racing SA	(Argentina) Juan Cruz Yacopini	(Spain) Daniel Oliveras	
Toyota	Hilux IMT EVO	(South Africa) Toyota Gazoo Racing SA	(South Africa) Saood Variawa	(France) François Cazalet	1–3
Toyota	Hilux IMT EVO	(South Africa) Toyota Gazoo Racing SA	(South Africa) Saood Variawa	(South Africa) Charan Moore	4
Toyota	Hilux IMT EVO	(South Africa) Toyota Gazoo Racing SA	(South Africa) Guy Botterill	(Spain) Oriol Mena	1–2
Toyota	Hilux IMT EVO	(South Africa) Toyota Gazoo Racing SA	(South Africa) Guy Botterill	(South Africa) Henry Köhne	4
Toyota	Hilux IMT EVO	(South Africa) Toyota Gazoo Racing SA	(Portugal) João Ferreira	(Portugal) Filipe Palmeiro	1–4
Toyota	Hilux IMT EVO	(Portugal) SVR Team	(Brazil) Marcos Baumgart	(Brazil) Kleber Cincea	2–4
Toyota	Hilux IMT EVO	(Portugal) SVR Team	(Argentina) Lucio Alvarez	(Argentina) Bernardo Graue	2–4
Toyota	Hilux IMT EVO	(Portugal) SVR Team	(Brazil) Cristian Baumgart	(Brazil) Luis Felipe Eckel	3
Volkswagen	Amarok	(Germany) PS Laser Racing	(Germany) Daniel Schröder	(South Africa) Henry Carl Köhne	1
Stock Teams & Drivers
Constructor	Vehicle	Team	Driver	Co-driver	Rounds
Defender	Dakar D7X-R	(United Kingdom) Defender Rally	(France) Stéphane Peterhansel	(France) Michaël Metge	1–4
Defender	Dakar D7X-R	(United Kingdom) Defender Rally	(Lithuania) Rokas Baciuška	(Spain) Oriol Vidal	1–4
Defender	Dakar D7X-R	(United Kingdom) Defender Rally	(United States) Sara Price	(United States) Sean Berriman	1–2, 4
Defender	Dakar D7X-R	(United Kingdom) Defender Rally	(United States) Sara Price	(United States) Saydiie Gray	3
Toyota	Land Cruiser GR Sport	(Japan) Team Land Cruiser Toyota Auto Body	(Japan) Akira Miura	(France) Jean-Michel Polato	1
Toyota	Land Cruiser GR Sport	(Japan) Team Land Cruiser Toyota Auto Body	(Saudi Arabia) Yasir Seaidan	(France) Jean-Michel Polato	4
Toyota	Land Cruiser GR Sport	(Japan) Team Land Cruiser Toyota Auto Body	(France) Ronald Basso	(France) Julien Menard	1
Challenger Teams & Drivers
Constructor	Vehicle	Team	Driver	Co-driver	Rounds
Bairons SIA	SRT Viking	(Latvia) Bairons SIA	(Spain) Pau Navarro	(Spain) Jan Rosa	2
BRP Can-Am	Maverick XRS	(France) BBR Motorsport	(Chile) Lucas Del Rio	(Argentina) Bruno Jacomy	1
BRP Can-Am	Maverick R	(Qatar) QMMF Team	(Qatar) Abdulaziz Al-Kuwari	(France) Xavier Panseri	4
GRallyTeam	G-Ecko	(Belgium) KTM X-Bow Powered By G Rally Team	(Netherlands) Puck Klaassen	(Argentina) Augusto Sanz	1–4
GRallyTeam	G-Ecko	(Belgium) KTM X-Bow Powered By G Rally Team	(Luxembourg) Charles Munster	(France) Xavier Panseri	1–2
GRallyTeam	G-Ecko	(Belgium) G Rally Team	(Netherlands) Kees Koolen	(Netherlands) Jurgen van den Goorbergh	1
GRallyTeam	G-Ecko	(Belgium) G Rally Team	(Portugal) Rui Carneiro	(Portugal) Fausto Mota	2
MMP	T3 Rally Raid	(Belgium) G Rally Team	(Portugal) Rui Carneiro	(Portugal) Fausto Mota	1
Odyssey	CR-X	(France) BBR Motorsport	(Germany) Daniel Schröder	(South Africa) Leonard Cremer	4
PH-Sport	Zephyr Phase 2	(France) BTR-Proparc	(France) Hervé Guillaume	(France) Maxime Guillaume	1
Taurus	EVO Max	(Spain) Vertical Motorsport	(Argentina) Nicolás Cavigliasso	(Argentina) Valentina Pertegarini	1
Taurus	EVO Max	(France) Team Race World	(Saudi Arabia) Yasir Seaidan	(France) Xavier Flick	1
Taurus	EVO Max	(Switzerland) Rebellion - Spierings	(Netherlands) Paul Spierings	(Netherlands) Jan Pieter van der Stelt	1
Taurus	EVO Max	(Switzerland) Rebellion - Spierings	(Netherlands) Paul Spierings	(Netherlands) Mark Salomons	2
Taurus	EVO Max	(Switzerland) Rebellion - Spierings	(Netherlands) Paul Spierings	(Netherlands) Kala Senders	4
Taurus	EVO Max	(Qatar) QMMF Team	(Qatar) Abdulaziz Al-Kuwari	(France) Stéphane Duple	1
Taurus	EVO Max	(Netherlands) Daklapack Rallysport	(Netherlands) Pim Klaassen	(Netherlands) Mark Laan	1
Taurus	T3 Max	(France) BBR Motorsport	Sergei Remennik	Aleksei Ignatov	1
Taurus	T3 Max	(France) BBR Motorsport	(Argentina) David Zille	(Argentina) Sebastian Cesana	1
Taurus	T3 Max	(France) BBR Motorsport	(Portugal) Pedro Gonçalves	(Portugal) Hugo Magalhães	1–2
Taurus	T3 Max	(France) BBR Motorsport	(Portugal) Pedro Gonçalves	(France) Sébastien Delaunay	3
Taurus	T3 Max	(France) BBR Motorsport	(Chile) Lucas Del Rio	(Argentina) Bruno Jacomy	2
Taurus	T3 Max	(France) Odyssey Academy by BBR	(Saudi Arabia) Dania Akeel	(France) Sébastien Delaunay	1–2
Taurus	T3 Max	(France) Odyssey Academy by BBR	(Spain) Pau Navarro	(Spain) Jan Rosa	1
Taurus	T3 Max	(France) Odyssey Academy by BBR	(Argentina) Kevin Benavides	(Argentina) Lisandro Sisterna	1
Taurus	T3 Max	(France) Odyssey Academy by BBR	(Portugal) Alexandre Pinto	(Portugal) Bernardo Oliveira	3–4
Taurus	T3 Max	(Portugal) Old Friends Rally Team	(Portugal) Alexandre Pinto	(Portugal) Bernardo Oliveira	2
Taurus	T3 Max	(Netherlands) Daklapack Rallysport	(Netherlands) Mitchel van den Brink	(Netherlands) Bart van Heun	2
Taurus	T3 Max	(Portugal) RC Motorsport	(Portugal) Rui Carneiro	(Portugal) Fausto Mota	4
X-Raid	Fenic	(Germany) X-Raid	(Italy) Rebecca Busi	(Uruguay) Sergio Lafuente	1
SSV Teams & Drivers
Constructor	Vehicle	Team	Driver	Co-driver	Rounds
BRP Can-Am	Maverick R	(Germany) Can-Am Factory Team	(Portugal) João Monteiro	(Portugal) Nuno Morais	1–2
BRP Can-Am	Maverick R	(Germany) Can-Am Factory Team	(United States) Hunter Miller	(United States) Jeremy Gray	1
BRP Can-Am	Maverick R	(Germany) Can-Am Factory Team	(United States) Kyle Chaney	(United States) Jacob Argubright	1
BRP Can-Am	Maverick R	(Germany) Can-Am Factory Team LATAM	(Chile) Francisco López	(Chile) Álvaro Leon	1
BRP Can-Am	Maverick R	(Germany) Can-Am Factory Team LATAM	(Argentina) Manuel Andújar	(Argentina) Andrés Frini	1
BRP Can-Am	Maverick R	(Germany) Can-Am Factory Team LATAM	(Argentina) Jeremias Gonzalez Ferioli	(Argentina) Gonzalo Rinaldi	1–4
BRP Can-Am	Maverick R	(Germany) South Racing Can-Am	(Poland) Maciej Oleksowicz	(Poland) Marcin Sienkiewicz	1
BRP Can-Am	Maverick R	(Germany) South Racing Can-Am	(United Kingdom) Richard Aczel	(Netherlands) Wouter Rosegaar	1
BRP Can-Am	Maverick R	(Germany) South Racing Can-Am	(Saudi Arabia) Hassan Jameel	(Poland) Maciej Giemza	1
BRP Can-Am	Maverick R	(Germany) South Racing Can-Am	(Saudi Arabia) Hassan Jameel	(France) Xavier Flick	4
BRP Can-Am	Maverick R	(Germany) South Racing Can-Am	(Portugal) Luís Cidade	(Portugal) Valter Cardoso	2
BRP Can-Am	Maverick R	(Germany) South Racing Can-Am	(Brazil) Pedro MacDowell	(Brazil) Daniel Spolidorio	2–3
BRP Can-Am	Maverick R	(Germany) South Racing Can-Am	(Austria) Matthias Walkner	(Spain) Oriol Mena	4
BRP Can-Am	Maverick R	(Germany) South Racing Can-Am	(Italy) Eugenio Amos	(Italy) Paolo Ceci	4
BRP Can-Am	Maverick R	(Spain) Buggy Masters Team	(Spain) Joan Piferrer	(Spain) Xavier Blanco	1–4
BRP Can-Am	Maverick R	(Lithuania) Izoton Sport	(Lithuania) Mindaugas Sidabras	(Lithuania) Ernestas Česokas	1–4
Polaris	RZR Pro R Sport	(Portugal) Old Friends Rally Team	(Portugal) Alexandre Pinto	(Portugal) Bernardo Oliveira	1
Polaris	RZR Pro R Sport	(Portugal) Santag Racing	(Portugal) Helder Rodrigues	(Portugal) Gonçalo Reis	1
Polaris	RZR Pro R Sport	(Portugal) Santag Racing	(Portugal) João Dias	(Portugal) Daniel Jordão	1

=== Scoring system ===
Points are awarded to every W2RC-listed entrant, regardless of whether they finish the event or not. Stage points are awarded for the top five finishers of every stage whose special section exceeds 100km. In a Power Selective Section, only the top three receive points.

Rally points

Position	1st	2nd	3rd	4th	5th	6th	7th	8th	9th	10th	11th	12th	13th	14th	15th	16th+	Retired
Points	30	25	20	17	15	13	11	9	8	7	6	5	4	3	2	2	1

Marathon points

Position	1st	2nd	3rd	4th	5th	6th	7th	8th	9th	10th	11th	12th	13th	14th	15th	16th+	Retired
Points	50	40	30	26	23	20	17	15	13	11	9	7	6	5	4	4	2

Stage points

Position	1st	2nd	3rd	4th	5th
Points	5	4	3	2	1

Power Selective Section points

Position	1st	2nd	3rd
Points	3	2	1

=== World Drivers' & Co-Drivers' championships ===
The driver/co-driver who records a points-scoring classification would be taken into account for the championship regardless of the categories.

Pos.	Driver	Class	DAK (Saudi Arabia)	PRT (Portugal)	ARG (Argentina)	MOR (Morocco)	ABU (United Arab Emirates)	Points
1	(United States) Seth Quintero	Ultimate	9^{13+11}	2^{25+12}	1^{30+10}	1^{30+4}		135
2	(France) Sébastien Loeb	Ultimate	4^{26+13}	1^{30+18}	4^{17+10}	65^{2+5}		121
3	(Qatar) Nasser Al-Attiyah	Ultimate	1^{50+23}	38^{2+5}	3^{20+11}	17^{2+2}		115
4	(Portugal) João Ferreira	Ultimate	18^{4+8}	3^{20+14}	27^{2+4}	2^{25+9}		86
5	(South Africa) Henk Lategan	Ultimate	21^{4+16}	Ret^{1}	2^{25+10}	3^{20+9}		85
6	(Spain) Nani Roma	Ultimate	2^{40+5}		8^{11+3}	4^{17+1}		77
7	(Brazil) Lucas Moraes	Ultimate	7^{17+7}	4^{17+12}	31^{2+2}	59^{2+11}		70
8	(Sweden) Mattias Ekström	Ultimate	3^{30+22}	Ret^{1}		63^{2+7}		62
9	(Spain) Carlos Sainz Sr.	Ultimate	5^{23+4}	Ret^{1}	29^{2+8}	6^{13+7}		58
10	(Poland) Eryk Goczał	Ultimate	17^{4+7}	7^{11}	13^{7+9}	8^{9+9}		56
11	(France) Mathieu Serradori	Ultimate	6^{20+7}	44^{2}		7^{11+5}		45
12	(United States) Mitchell Guthrie	Ultimate	12^{7+16}		Ret^{1}	5^{15+5}		44
13	(South Africa) Saood Variawa	Ultimate	10^{11+5}	Ret^{1}	5^{15+4}	Ret^{1}		37
14	(Saudi Arabia) Yazeed Al-Rajhi	Ultimate	Ret^{2+3}	6^{13+4}	6^{13}	Ret^{1}		36
15	(South Africa) Guy Botterill	Ultimate	14^{5+4}	5^{15+9}		Ret^{1}		34
16	(Poland) Marek Goczał	Ultimate	13^{6+5}	10^{8}	30^{2}	11^{7}		28
17	(Czech Republic) Martin Prokop	Ultimate	23^{4+10}	Ret^{1}	15^{5}	10^{8}		28
18	(Australia) Toby Price	Ultimate	8^{15+12}					27
19	(Portugal) Alexandre Pinto	SSV	Ret^{2}					24
19	(Portugal) Alexandre Pinto	Challenger		9^{9+1}	11^{9}	15^{3}		24
20	(Netherlands) Puck Klaassen	Challenger	36^{4}	29^{2}	12^{8}	Ret^{1}		15
21	(Belgium) Guillaume De Mévius	Ultimate	42^{4+7}			60^{2+2}		15
22	(Brazil) Marcos Baumgart	Ultimate		12^{6}	25^{2}	12^{6}		14
23	(Chile) Hernán Garcés	Ultimate	29^{4}	32^{2}	14^{6}	16^{2}		14
24	(France) Stéphane Peterhansel	Stock	121^{4}	16^{3}	17^{4}	38^{2}		13
25	(Luxembourg) Charles Munster	Challenger	127^{4}	11^{7}				11
26	(Spain) Cristina Gutiérrez	Ultimate	11^{9+2}					11
27	(Kyrgyzstan) Denis Krotov	Ultimate	41^{4}	Ret^{1}	Ret^{1}	13^{5}		11
28	(Lithuania) Rokas Baciuška	Stock	51^{4}	17^{2}	18^{3}	62^{2}		11
29	(United States) Sara Price	Stock	65^{4}	30^{2}	19^{2}	80^{2}		10
30	(Lithuania) Mindaugas Sidabras	SSV	117^{4}	31^{2}	21^{2}	53^{2}		10
31	(Netherlands) Kees Koolen	Challenger	58^{4}					10
31	(Netherlands) Kees Koolen	Ultimate		23^{2}	20^{2}	19^{2}		10
32	(Spain) Joan Piferrer	SSV	92^{4}	33^{2}	22^{2}	Ret^{1}		9
33	(Japan) Akira Miura	Stock	133^{4}					9
33	(Japan) Akira Miura	Ultimate		26^{2}	Ret^{1}	30^{2}		9
34	(Argentina) Lucio Alvarez	Ultimate		13^{5}	28^{2}	Ret^{1}		8
35	(Portugal) João Monteiro	SSV	48^{4}	15^{4}				8
36	(Argentina) Jeremias Gonzalez Ferioli	SSV	50^{4}	18^{2}		34^{2}		8
37	(Netherlands) Paul Spierings	Challenger	49^{4}	40^{2}		68^{2}		8
38	(Portugal) Rui Carneiro	Challenger	86^{4}	21^{2}		23^{2}		8
39	(Poland) Michał Goczał	Ultimate	19^{4+4}					8
40	(Saudi Arabia) Dania Akeel	Challenger	45^{4}	Ret^{1}		61^{2}		7
41	(Portugal) Pedro Gonçalves	Challenger	54^{4}	24^{2}	Ret^{1}			7
42	(Spain) Laia Sanz	Ultimate	20^{4}	36^{2}		Ret^{1}		7
43	(France) Romain Dumas	Ultimate	Ret^{2}			14^{4}		6
44	(Saudi Arabia) Hassan Jameel	SSV	134^{4}			64^{2}		6
45	(Saudi Arabia) Yasir Seaidan	Challenger	30^{4}			44^{2}		6
46	(Czech Republic) Miroslav Zapletal	Ultimate	63^{4}	42^{2}				6
47	(France) Lionel Baud	Ultimate	35^{4}			67^{2}		6
48	(Argentina) Kevin Benavides	Challenger	44^{4}					5
48	(Argentina) Kevin Benavides	Ultimate				Ret^{1}		5
49	(Spain) Pau Navarro	Challenger	28^{4}	Ret^{1}				5
50	(Chile) Lucas Del Rio	Challenger	33^{4}	Ret^{1}				5
51	(Spain) Isidre Esteve	Ultimate	Ret^{2}			22^{2}		4
52	(Qatar) Abdulaziz Al-Kuwari	Challenger	Ret^{2}			29^{2}		4
53	(Italy) Rebecca Busi	Challenger	116^{4}					4
54	(France) Jean-Luc Ceccaldi	Ultimate	Ret^{2}			32^{2}		4
55	(Netherlands) Pim Klaassen	Challenger	85^{4}					4
56	(Canada) Nathan Hayashi	Ultimate	145^{4}					4
57	(United States) Hunter Miller	SSV	137^{4}					4
58	Sergei Remennik	Challenger	97^{4}					4
59	(Argentina) David Zille	Challenger	53^{4}					4
60	(Argentina) Nicolás Cavigliasso	Challenger	32^{4}					4
61	(United States) Kyle Chaney	SSV	37^{4}					4
62	(France) Ronald Basso	Stock	88^{4}					4
63	(Chile) Francisco López	SSV	52^{4}					4
64	(Argentina) Manuel Andújar	SSV	55^{4}					4
65	(Poland) Maciej Oleksowicz	SSV	74^{4}					4
66	(United Kingdom) Richard Aczel	SSV	84^{4}					4
67	(Portugal) Helder Rodrigues	SSV	126^{4}					4
68	(France) Hervé Guillaume	Challenger	130^{4}					4
69	(Greece) Jourdan Serderidis	Ultimate	Ret^{2}			Ret^{1}		3
70	(Germany) Daniel Schröder	Ultimate	Ret^{2}					3
70	(Germany) Daniel Schröder	Challenger				Ret^{1}		3
71	(Austria) Matthias Walkner	SSV				20^{2}		2
72	(Portugal) João Dias	SSV	Ret^{2}					2
73	(Austria) Mark Mustermann	Ultimate		Ret^{1}		Ret^{1}		2
74	(Netherlands) Mitchel van den Brink	Challenger		35^{2}				2
75	(Seychelles) Aliyyah Koloc	Ultimate	Ret^{2}					2
76	(Portugal) Luís Cidade	SSV		46^{2}				2
77	(Brazil) Pedro MacDowell	SSV		Ret^{1}	Ret^{1}			2
78	(Brazil) Cristian Baumgart	Ultimate			26^{2}			2
79	(Czech Republic) Martin Koloc	Ultimate	Ret^{2}					2
80	(Italy) Eugenio Amos	SSV				Ret^{1}		1
-	(Argentina) Juan Cruz Yacopini	Ultimate	WD					-
Drivers ineligible for championship points
	(Brazil) Marcelo Gastaldi	Ultimate		39	7			
	(Portugal) Francisco Barreto	Ultimate		8		Ret		
	(Argentina) Sebastian Halpern	Ultimate			9	45		
	(Spain) Cristina Gutiérrez	Ultimate				9		
	(France) Simon Vitse	Ultimate	15					
	(Argentina) Kevin Benavides	Ultimate			16			
	(South Africa) Brian Baragwanath	Ultimate	16					
	(Estonia) Urvo Männama	Ultimate				18		
	(Brazil) Cristian Baumgart	Ultimate		20				
	(France) Christian Lavieille	Ultimate	22					
	(United Arab Emirates) Khalid Al Qassimi	Ultimate	24					
	(France) Ronan Chabot	Ultimate	25					
	(Belgium) Philippe Lambilliotte	Ultimate				25		
	(China) Wei Han	Ultimate	26					
	(China) Binglong Lu	Ultimate	27					
	(Poland) Włodzimierz Grajek	Ultimate				28		
	(Belgium) Sam Heyvaert	Ultimate		34				
	(China) Yongming Tao	Ultimate	34					
	(Poland) Tomasz Baranowski	Ultimate				35		
	(Austria) Vic Flip	Ultimate				36		
	(France) Benoît Fretin	Ultimate	59			42		
	(France) Jean-Rémy Bergounhe	Ultimate	47					
	(Spain) José María Cami	Ultimate				52		
	(Germany) Markus Walcher	Ultimate				55		
	(Austria) Mark Mustermann	Ultimate	56					
	(Lithuania) Gintas Petrus	Ultimate	87			57		
	(United Arab Emirates) Khalid Aljafla	Ultimate	60					
	(France) François Cousin	Ultimate	61					
	(Czech Republic) Karel Trneny	Ultimate	62					
	(Argentina) Nicolás Cavigliasso	Ultimate				66		
	(China) Benyang Xu	Ultimate	67					
	(Portugal) Maria Gameiro	Ultimate	68					
	(Netherlands) Michael van Eikeren	Ultimate				69		
	(Netherlands) Rik van den Brink	Ultimate				70		
	(Netherlands) Gert-Jan van der Valk	Ultimate				74		
	(Netherlands) Roger Grouwels	Ultimate	76					
	(Spain) Jordi Torras	Ultimate	77					
	(United Kingdom) David Beecroft	Ultimate				77		
	(Italy) Silvio Totani	Ultimate	79					
	(Netherlands) Janus van Kasteren	Ultimate	82					
	(Canada) Nathan Hayashi	Ultimate				82		
	(Netherlands) Tim Coronel	Ultimate	83					
	(Netherlands) Maik Willems	Ultimate	89					
	(China) Guorul Wang	Ultimate	93					
	(Spain) Ferran Jubany	Ultimate	94					
	(Netherlands) Dave Klaassen	Ultimate	103					
	(France) Bruno Miot	Ultimate	122					
	(Brazil) Marcos Moraes	Ultimate	123					
	(France) Jean-Pierre Strugo	Ultimate	125					
	(China) Biaobiao Zhang	Ultimate	131					
	(China) Po Tian	Ultimate	135					
	(Germany) Jürgen Schröder	Ultimate	136					
	(China) Gaoxiang Fan	Ultimate	141					
	(Spain) Pedro Peñate	Ultimate	150					
	(Lithuania) Benediktas Vanagas	Ultimate	Ret					
	(Spain) Jesús Calleja	Ultimate	Ret					
	(China) Zhao Yuqiao	Ultimate	Ret					
	(Netherlands) Michiel Becx	Ultimate	Ret					
	(Spain) Luis Recuenco	Ultimate		Ret				
	(Belgium) Steven Rotsaert	Ultimate		Ret				
	(United Kingdom) Daniel Beecroft	Ultimate				Ret		
	(Netherlands) Rients Hofstra	Ultimate				Ret		
	(France) Benoît Maurice	Ultimate				Ret		
	(Italy) Alberto Morganti	Ultimate				Ret		
Pos.	Driver	Class	DAK (Saudi Arabia)	PRT (Portugal)	ARG (Argentina)	MOR (Morocco)	ABU (United Arab Emirates)	Points

Pos.	Driver	Class	DAK (Saudi Arabia)	PRT (Portugal)	ARG (Argentina)	MOR (Morocco)	ABU (United Arab Emirates)	Points
1	(United States) Andrew Short	Ultimate	9^{13+11}	2^{25+12}	1^{30+10}	1^{30+4}		135
2	(France) Édouard Boulanger	Ultimate	4^{26+13}	1^{30+18}	4^{17+10}	65^{2+5}		121
3	(Belgium) Fabian Lurquin	Ultimate	1^{50+23}	38^{2+5}	3^{20+11}	17^{2+2}		115
4	(Portugal) Filipe Palmeiro	Ultimate	18^{4+8}	3^{20+14}	27^{2+4}	2^{25+9}		86
5	(South Africa) Brett Cummings	Ultimate	21^{4+16}	Ret^{1}	2^{25+10}	3^{20+9}		85
6	(Spain) Alex Haro	Ultimate	2^{40+5}		8^{11+3}	4^{17+1}		77
7	(Sweden) Emil Bergkvist	Ultimate	3^{30+22}	Ret^{1}		63^{2+7}		62
8	(Germany) Dennis Zenz	Ultimate	7^{17+7}	4^{17+12}	31^{2+2}	Ret^{1}		58
9	(Poland) Szymon Gospodarczyk	Ultimate	17^{4+7}	7^{11}	13^{7+9}	8^{9+9}		56
10	(France) Loïc Minaudier	Ultimate	6^{20+7}	44^{2}		7^{11+5}		45
11	(United States) Kellon Walch	Ultimate	12^{7+16}		Ret^{1}	5^{15+5}		44
12	(France) François Cazalet	Ultimate	10^{11+5}	Ret^{1}	5^{15+4}			36
13	(Spain) Oriol Mena	Ultimate	14^{5+4}	5^{15+9}		20^{2}		35
14	(Germany) Timo Gottschalk	Ultimate	Ret^{2+3}	6^{13+4}	6^{13}			35
15	(Spain) Armand Monleón	Ultimate	8^{15+12}	26^{2}	Ret^{1}	30^{2}		32
16	(Spain) Daniel Oliveras	Ultimate	WD	Ret^{1}	29^{2+8}	6^{13+7}		31
17	(Spain) Lucas Cruz	Ultimate	5^{23+4}			Ret^{1}		28
18	(Poland) Maciej Marton	Ultimate	13^{6+5}	10^{8}	30^{2}	11^{7}		28
19	(Czech Republic) Viktor Chytka	Ultimate	23^{4+10}	Ret^{1}	15^{5}	10^{8}		28
20	(Portugal) Bernardo Oliveira	SSV	Ret^{2}					24
20	(Portugal) Bernardo Oliveira	Challenger		9^{9+1}	11^{9}	15^{3}		24
21	(Spain) Pablo Moreno	Ultimate	11^{9+2}			59^{2+11}		24
22	(Argentina) Augusto Sanz	Challenger	36^{4}	29^{2}	12^{8}	Ret^{1}		15
23	(France) Mathieu Baumel	Ultimate	42^{4+7}			60^{2+2}		15
24	(Brazil) Kleber Cincea	Ultimate		12^{6}	25^{2}	12^{6}		14
25	(Chile) Juan Pablo Latrach	Ultimate	29^{4}	32^{2}	14^{6}	16^{2}		14
26	(France) Xavier Panseri	Challenger	127^{4}	11^{7}		29^{2}		13
27	(France) Michaël Metge	Stock	121^{4}	16^{3}	17^{4}	38^{2}		13
28	(Kyrgyzstan) Konstantin Zhiltsov	Ultimate	41^{4}	Ret^{1}	Ret^{1}	13^{5}		11
29	(Spain) Oriol Vidal	Stock	51^{4}	17^{2}	18^{3}	62^{2}		11
30	(Netherlands) Wouter Rosegaar	SSV	84^{4}					10
30	(Netherlands) Wouter Rosegaar	Ultimate		23^{2}	20^{2}	19^{2}		10
31	(Lithuania) Ernestas Česokas	SSV	117^{4}	31^{2}	21^{2}	53^{2}		10
32	(Spain) Xavier Blanco	SSV	92^{4}	33^{2}	22^{2}	Ret^{1}		9
33	(Argentina) Bernardo Graue	Ultimate		13^{5}	28^{2}	Ret^{1}		8
34	(Portugal) Nuno Morais	SSV	48^{4}	15^{4}				8
35	(Argentina) Gonzalo Rinaldi	SSV	50^{4}	18^{2}		34^{2}		8
36	(United States) Sean Berriman	Stock	65^{4}	30^{2}		80^{2}		8
37	(Spain) Diego Ortega	Ultimate	19^{4+4}					8
38	(France) Sébastien Delaunay	Challenger	45^{4}	Ret^{1}	Ret^{1}	61^{2}		8
39	(Portugal) Fausto Mota	Challenger	86^{4}	21^{2}		23^{2}		8
40	(Italy) Maurizio Gerini	Ultimate	20^{4}	36^{2}		Ret^{1}		7
41	(Slovakia) Marek Sýkora	Ultimate	63^{4}	42^{2}				6
42	(France) Xavier Flick	Challenger	30^{4}			64^{2}		6
43	(France) Jean-Michel Polato	Stock	133^{4}			44^{2}		6
44	(Portugal) Hugo Magalhães	Challenger	54^{4}	24^{2}				6
45	(France) Lucie Baud	Ultimate	35^{4}			67^{2}		6
46	(Spain) Jan Rosa	Challenger	28^{4}	Ret^{1}				5
47	(Argentina) Lisandro Sisterna	Challenger	44^{4}			Ret^{1}		5
48	(Argentina) Bruno Jacomy	Challenger	33^{4}	Ret^{1}				5
49	(France) Anthony Pes	Challenger				14^{4}		4
50	(Spain) José Maria Villalobos	Ultimate	Ret^{2}			22^{2}		4
51	(Argentina) Andrés Frini	SSV	55^{4}					4
52	(Chile) Álvaro Leon	SSV	52^{4}					4
53	(Canada) Shane Hairsine	Ultimate	145^{4}					4
54	(Argentina) Sebastian Cesana	Challenger	53^{4}					4
55	(France) Julien Menard	Stock	88^{4}					4
56	(Argentina) Valentina Pertegarini	Challenger	32^{4}					4
57	(United States) Jeremy Gray	SSV	137^{4}					4
58	(Poland) Maciej Giemza	SSV	134^{4}					4
59	(Uruguay) Sergio Lafuente	Challenger	116^{4}					4
60	(Portugal) Gonçalo Reis	SSV	126^{4}					4
61	(Netherlands) Jan Pieter van der Stelt	Challenger	49^{4}					4
62	(Netherlands) Mark Laan	Challenger	85^{4}					4
63	Aleksei Ignatov	Challenger	97^{4}					4
64	(France) Maxime Guillaume	Challenger	130^{4}					4
65	(Poland) Marcin Sienkiewicz	SSV	74^{4}					4
66	(United States) Jacob Argubright	SSV	37^{4}					4
67	(Netherlands) Jurgen van den Goorbergh	Challenger	58^{4}					4
68	(South Africa) Henry Carl Köhne	Ultimate	Ret^{2}			Ret^{1}		3
69	(United States) Saydiie Gray	Stock			19^{2}			2
70	(France) Christophe Crespo	Ultimate				32^{2}		2
71	(Netherlands) Kala Senders	Challenger				68^{2}		2
72	(France) Alexandre Winocq	Ultimate	Ret^{2}					2
73	(Austria) Michael Zajc	Ultimate		Ret^{1}		Ret^{1}		2
74	(Italy) Mirko Brun	Ultimate	Ret^{2}					2
75	(Brazil) Daniel Spolidorio	SSV		Ret^{1}	Ret^{1}			2
76	(Netherlands) Mark Salomons	Challenger		40^{2}				2
77	(Netherlands) Bart van Heun	Challenger		35^{2}				2
78	(Brazil) Luis Felipe Eckel	Ultimate			26^{2}			2
79	(Portugal) Daniel Jordão	SSV	Ret^{2}					2
80	(Poland) Marcin Pasek	Ultimate	Ret^{2}					2
81	(France) Stéphane Duple	Challenger	Ret^{2}					2
82	(Luxembourg) Grégoire Munster	Ultimate	Ret^{2}					2
83	(France) Pascal Delacour	Ultimate	Ret^{2}					2
84	(Portugal) Valter Cardoso	SSV		46^{2}				2
85	(Italy) Paolo Ceci	SSV				Ret^{1}		1
86	(South Africa) Leonard Cremer	Challenger				Ret^{1}		1
87	(South Africa) Charan Moore	Ultimate				Ret^{1}		1
Co-Drivers ineligible for championship points
	(Brazil) Carlos Sachs	Ultimate		39	7			
	(Portugal) Paulo Fíuza	Ultimate		8		Ret		
	(Argentina) Eduardo Pulenta	Ultimate			9	45		
	(Spain) Marc Solà	Ultimate	94			9		
	(France) Max Delfino	Ultimate	15					
	(Argentina) Lisandro Sisterna	Ultimate			16			
	(South Africa) Leonard Cremer	Ultimate	16					
	(Estonia) Kuldar Sikk	Ultimate				18		
	(Brazil) Luis Felipe Eckel	Ultimate		20				
	(France) Valentin Sarreaud	Ultimate	22					
	(United Arab Emirates) Khalid Alkendi	Ultimate	24					
	(France) Gilles Pillot	Ultimate	25					
	(France) Paul Duramé	Ultimate				25		
	(China) Li Ma	Ultimate	26					
	(China) He Sha	Ultimate	27					
	(Poland) Jacek Czachor	Ultimate				28		
	(Belgium) Dave Berghmans	Ultimate		34				
	(China) Liguo Fu	Ultimate	34					
	(Poland) Konrad Dudziński	Ultimate				35		
	(Germany) Stefan Henken	Ultimate				36		
	(France) Cédric Duplé	Ultimate	59			42		
	(France) Anthony Pes	Ultimate	47					
	(Spain) Cristian Cami	Ultimate				52		
	(Germany) Stephan Stensky	Ultimate				55		
	(Austria) Michael Zajc	Ultimate	56					
	(Spain) Álvaro de Haro	Ultimate				57		
	Andrei Rudnitski	Ultimate	60					
	(France) Stéphane Cousin	Ultimate	61					
	(Czech Republic) Vaclav Pritzl	Ultimate	62					
	(Argentina) Valentina Pertegarini	Ultimate				66		
	(China) Lei Tian	Ultimate	67					
	(Spain) Rosa Romero	Ultimate	68					
	(Netherlands) Jasper Riezebos	Ultimate	89			69		
	(Netherlands) Gydo Heimans	Ultimate				70		
	(Netherlands) Branco de Lange	Ultimate				74		
	(Netherlands) Rudolf Meijer	Ultimate	76					
	(Spain) Santi Costa	Ultimate	77					
	(United Kingdom) Fraser Parish	Ultimate				77		
	(Italy) Tito Totani	Ultimate	79					
	(Netherlands) Marcel Snijders	Ultimate	82					
	(Canada) Shane Hairsine	Ultimate				82		
	(Netherlands) Tom Coronel	Ultimate	83					
	(Kazakhstan) Nursultan Abykayev	Ultimate	87					
	(China) Yu Tian	Ultimate	93					
	(Netherlands) Tessa Klaassen	Ultimate	103					
	(France) Christophe Crespo	Ultimate	122					
	(Brazil) Fabio Pedroso	Ultimate	123					
	(France) Kevin Morel	Ultimate	125					
	(China) Wenke Ma	Ultimate	131					
	(China) Simuren Ha	Ultimate	135					
	(South Africa) Stuart Gregory	Ultimate	136					
	(China) Kai Zhao	Ultimate	141					
	(Spain) Daniel Mesa	Ultimate	150					
	(Netherlands) Wouter de Graaff	Ultimate	Ret			Ret		
	(Lithuania) Aisvydas Paliukenas	Ultimate	Ret					
	(Spain) Eduardo Blanco	Ultimate	Ret					
	(China) Gui Haibo	Ultimate	Ret					
	(Spain) Daniel Cámara	Ultimate		Ret				
	(Belgium) Emile Dewitte	Ultimate		Ret				
	(United Kingdom) Phillip Gillespie	Ultimate				Ret		
	(France) Yannick Collongues	Ultimate				Ret		
	(Italy) Massimiliano Catarsi	Ultimate				Ret		
Pos.	Driver	Class	DAK (Saudi Arabia)	PRT (Portugal)	ARG (Argentina)	MOR (Morocco)	ABU (United Arab Emirates)	Points

=== Stock Drivers' & Co-Drivers' championships ===
Pos.	Driver	DAK (Saudi Arabia)	PRT (Portugal)	ARG (Argentina)	MOR (Morocco)	ABU (United Arab Emirates)	Points
1	(Lithuania) Rokas Baciuška	1^{50+57}	2^{25+21}	2^{25+21}	3^{20+14}		233
2	(France) Stéphane Peterhansel	4^{26+43}	1^{30+19}	1^{30+22}	1^{30+20}		220
3	(United States) Sara Price	2^{40+47}	3^{20+20}	3^{20+17}	4^{17+13}		194
4	(France) Ronald Basso	3^{30+26}					56
5	(Saudi Arabia) Yasir Seaidan				2^{25+19}		44
6	(Japan) Akira Miura	5^{23+19}					42
Drivers ineligible for championship points
	(Hungary) Peter Hamza	6					
	(Saudi Arabia) Majed Althunayyan	7					
Pos.	Driver	DAK (Saudi Arabia)	PRT (Portugal)	ARG (Argentina)	MOR (Morocco)	ABU (United Arab Emirates)	Points

Pos.	Driver	DAK (Saudi Arabia)	PRT (Portugal)	ARG (Argentina)	MOR (Morocco)	ABU (United Arab Emirates)	Points
1	(Spain) Oriol Vidal	1^{50+57}	2^{25+21}	2^{25+21}	3^{20+14}		233
2	(France) Michaël Metge	4^{26+43}	1^{30+19}	1^{30+22}	1^{30+20}		220
3	(United States) Sean Berriman	2^{40+47}	3^{20+20}		4^{17+13}		157
4	(France) Jean-Michel Polato	5^{23+19}			2^{25+19}		86
5	(France) Julien Menard	3^{30+26}					56
6	(United States) Saydiie Gray			3^{20+17}			37
Co-Drivers ineligible for championship points
	(Austria) Andras Kalmar	6					
	(Saudi Arabia) Hani Al Noumesi	7					
Pos.	Driver	DAK (Saudi Arabia)	PRT (Portugal)	ARG (Argentina)	MOR (Morocco)	ABU (United Arab Emirates)	Points

=== Challenger Drivers' & Co-Drivers' championships ===
Pos.	Driver	DAK (Saudi Arabia)	PRT (Portugal)	ARG (Argentina)	MOR (Morocco)	ABU (United Arab Emirates)	Points
1	(Portugal) Alexandre Pinto		1^{30+20}	2^{30+23}	1^{30+24}		157
2	(Netherlands) Puck Klaassen	5^{23+20}	7^{15+7}	3^{25+22}	Ret^{1}		113
3	(Netherlands) Paul Spierings	9^{15+21}	9^{11+7}		12^{17+14}		85
4	(Portugal) Rui Carneiro	18^{6+1}	3^{20+6}		2^{25+17}		75
5	(Spain) Pau Navarro	1^{50+16}	Ret^{1}				67
6	(Saudi Arabia) Yasir Seaidan	2^{40+21}					61
7	(Argentina) Nicolás Cavigliasso	3^{30+27}					57
8	(Luxembourg) Charles Munster	30^{4+4}	2^{25+18}				51
9	(Argentina) Kevin Benavides	7^{20+26}					46
10	(Chile) Lucas Del Rio	4^{26+15}	Ret^{1+3}				45
11	(Saudi Arabia) Dania Akeel	8^{17+26}	Ret^{1}				44
12	(Portugal) Pedro Gonçalves	11^{11}	4^{17+10}	Ret^{1}			39
13	(Qatar) Abdulaziz Al-Kuwari	Ret^{2}			5^{20+13}		35
14	(Argentina) David Zille	10^{13+17}					30
15	(Netherlands) Mitchel van den Brink		8^{13+4}				17
16	(Netherlands) Kees Koolen	12^{9}					9
17	(Netherlands) Pim Klaassen	17^{7}					7
18	Sergei Remennik	22^{5}					5
19	(Italy) Rebecca Busi	28^{4}					4
20	(France) Hervé Guillaume	31^{4}					4
21	(Germany) Daniel Schröder				Ret^{1}		1
Drivers ineligible for championship points
	(Austria) Matthias Walkner			1			
	(Argentina) Manuel Andújar				3		
	(South Africa) Jayden Els				4		
	(Argentina) Nazareno Lopez			4			
	(Angola) Rómulo Branco		5				
	(Hungary) Pál Lónyai		6		Ret		
	(Qatar) Khalifa Al-Attiyah				6		
	(Chile) Ignacio Casale	6					
	(France) Benjamin Favre	15			7		
	(Netherlands) Roger Grouwels				8		
	(Slovakia) Martin Benko				9		
	(Poland) Edward Ruszczyc				10		
	(Portugal) Ricardo Porém		10				
	(France) Jedidia Favre	13			11		
	(Portugal) Marco Pereira		11				
	(Netherlands) Lex Peters	16			13		
	(France) Hugues Lacam				14		
	(France) Alexandre Giroud	14					
	(France) Kevin Jimenez				15		
	(Russia) Pavel Andreev				16		
	(United Kingdom) Philip McVay				17		
	(Switzerland) Alexandre Pesci	19					
	(France) Aurélien Bouchet	20					
	(Austria) Vic Flip	21					
	(France) Bruno Saby	23					
	(Spain) Joan Font	24					
	(Poland) Piotr Beaupre	25					
	(Poland) Lukasz Zoll	26					
	(Netherlands) Riné Streppel	27					
	(France) Kevin Rouvière	29					
	(Netherlands) Dick van Culenborg	32					
	(Netherlands) Henri van Steenbergen	33					
	(Spain) Óscar Ral	Ret	Ret				
	(United States) Pablo Copetti	Ret					
	(Netherlands) Daniel Kersbergen	Ret					
	(Spain) Joan Gasso		Ret				
	(Qatar) Mohammed Al-Marri				Ret		
	(Brazil) Rodrigo Varela				Ret		
	(Poland) Adam Kuś				Ret		
	(France) Gérald Blanco				Ret		
	(Spain) Raúl Delgado				Ret		
Pos.	Driver	DAK (Saudi Arabia)	PRT (Portugal)	ARG (Argentina)	MOR (Morocco)	ABU (United Arab Emirates)	Points

Pos.	Driver	DAK (Saudi Arabia)	PRT (Portugal)	ARG (Argentina)	MOR (Morocco)	ABU (United Arab Emirates)	Points
1	(Portugal) Bernardo Oliveira		1^{30+20}	2^{30+23}	1^{30+24}		157
2	(Argentina) Augusto Sanz	5^{23+20}	7^{15+7}	3^{25+22}	Ret^{1}		113
3	(France) Xavier Panseri	30^{4+4}	2^{25+18}		5^{20+13}		84
4	(Portugal) Fausto Mota	18^{6+1}	3^{20+6}		2^{25+17}		75
5	(Spain) Jan Rosa	1^{50+16}	Ret^{1}				67
6	(France) Xavier Flick	2^{40+21}					61
7	(Argentina) Valentina Pertegarini	3^{30+27}					57
8	(Argentina) Lisandro Sisterna	7^{20+26}					46
9	(Argentina) Bruno Jacomy	4^{26+15}	Ret^{1+3}				45
10	(France) Sébastien Delaunay	8^{17+26}	Ret^{1}	Ret^{1}			45
11	(Portugal) Hugo Magalhães	11^{11}	4^{17+10}				38
12	(Netherlands) Jan Pieter van der Stelt	9^{15+21}					36
13	(Netherlands) Kala Senders				12^{17+14}		31
14	(Argentina) Sebastian Cesana	10^{13+17}					30
15	(Netherlands) Mark Salomons		9^{11+7}				18
16	(Netherlands) Bart van Heun		8^{13+4}				17
17	(Netherlands) Jurgen van den Goorbergh	12^{9}					9
18	(Netherlands) Mark Laan	17^{7}					7
19	Aleksei Ignatov	22^{5}					5
20	(Uruguay) Sergio Lafuente	28^{4}					4
21	(France) Maxime Guillaume	31^{4}					4
22	(France) Stéphane Duple	Ret^{2}					2
23	(South Africa) Leonard Cremer				Ret^{1}		1
Co-Drivers ineligible for championship points
	(Spain) Pablo Moreno			1			
	(Argentina) Andrés Frini				3		
	(Argentina) Fernando Acosta	Ret		4			
	(South Africa) Johannes Swemmer				4		
	(Portugal) João Serôdio		5				
	(Brazil) Carlos Sachs	6			Ret		
	(France) Max Delfino				6		
	(Norway) Ola Fløene		6				
	(France) Antoine Lecourbe	13			7		
	(Netherlands) Rudolf Meijer				8		
	(Czech Republic) Jiří Kalát				9		
	(Poland) Krzysztof Kubiś				10		
	(Portugal) Nuno Sousa		10				
	(France) Thibaud Darroux	15			11		
	(Portugal) Eurico Adão		11				
	(Netherlands) Arjan van Tiel				13		
	(France) Delphine Delfino				14		
	(France) Armelle Henry	14					
	(France) Stéphane Duplé				15		
	(Russia) Dmitry Pavlov				16		
	(Netherlands) Mark Salomons	16					
	(South Africa) William Avenant				17		
	(Switzerland) Stephan Kuhni	19					
	(France) Elisa Huguenin	20					
	(Germany) Stefan Henken	21					
	(France) Benjamin Boulloud	23					
	(Spain) Adriá Guillem	24					
	(Poland) Jarosław Kazberuk	25					
	(Poland) Michal Zoll	26					
	(Netherlands) Lisette Bakker	27					
	(France) Patrick Jimbert	29					
	(Netherlands) Mark Klinkhamer	32					
	(Netherlands) Daan van Ooijen	33					
	(Brazil) Enio Bozzano	Ret					
	(Belgium) Michiel Goegebeur	Ret					
	(Spain) Pol Ros		Ret				
	(Spain) Ion del Cid		Ret				
	(France) Pierre Delorme				Ret		
	(Poland) Maciej Giemza				Ret		
	(France) Thomas Gaidella				Ret		
	(Russia) Alexey Kuzmich				Ret		
	(Spain) José Luis Rosa				Ret		
Pos.	Driver	DAK (Saudi Arabia)	PRT (Portugal)	ARG (Argentina)	MOR (Morocco)	ABU (United Arab Emirates)	Points

=== SSV Drivers' & Co-Drivers' championships ===
Pos.	Driver	DAK (Saudi Arabia)	PRT (Portugal)	ARG (Argentina)	MOR (Morocco)	ABU (United Arab Emirates)	Points
1	(Argentina) Jeremias Gonzalez	5^{30+40}	3^{25+17}	DSQ	3^{25+20}		157
2	(Lithuania) Mindaugas Sidabras	21^{13+1}	7^{20+8}	1^{30+21}	9^{20+15}		128
3	(Portugal) João Monteiro	4^{40+34}	2^{30+19}				123
4	(United States) Kyle Chaney	2^{50+40}					90
5	(Spain) Joan Piferrer	14^{15}	8^{17+4}	2^{25+18}	Ret^{1}		80
6	(Chile) Francisco López	6^{26+33}					59
7	(Austria) Matthias Walkner				1^{30+23}		53
8	(Saudi Arabia) Hassan Jameel	26^{9}			10^{17+10}		36
9	(Portugal) Luís Cidade		12^{15+19}				34
10	(Argentina) Manuel Andújar	7^{23+6}					29
11	(United States) Hunter Miller	27^{7+17}					24
12	(Poland) Maciej Oleksowicz	9^{20}					20
13	(United Kingdom) Richard Aczel	12^{17}					17
14	(Portugal) Helder Rodrigues	23^{11+4}					15
15	(Portugal) João Dias	Ret^{2}					2
16	(Brazil) Pedro MacDowell		Ret^{1}	Ret^{1}			2
17	(Portugal) Alexandre Pinto	Ret^{2}					2
18	(Italy) Eugenio Amos				Ret^{1}		1
Drivers ineligible for championship points
	(Portugal) Miguel Barbosa		1				
	(United States) Brock Heger	1					
	(France) Andrea Deldossi		4		2		
	(Portugal) José Nogueira		6	3			
	(France) Xavier de Soultrait	3					
	(Spain) Juan Miguel Fidel				4		
	(France) Benoît Lepiètre	29			5		
	(Portugal) Paulo Jorge Rodrigues		5				
	(Mexico) Jorge Cano				6		
	(Saudi Arabia) Abdulaziz Al-Saud				7		
	(Italy) Eufrasio Anghileri				8		
	(Sweden) Johan Kristoffersson	8					
	(Portugal) Rúben Jorge Rodrigues		9				
	(Portugal) Bruno Oliveira		10				
	(France) Gauthier Honvault	10					
	(Slovakia) Juraj Varga				11		
	(Spain) José Ignacio Gayoso		11				
	(Ecuador) Sebastian Guayasamin	11					
	(France) Fabien Domas				12		
	(Czech Republic) Tomáš Kubiena				13		
	(Portugal) Filipe Lopes		13				
	(Kazakhstan) Denis Berezovskiy	13					
	(Morocco) Souad Mouktadiri				14		
	(Saudi Arabia) Hamad Al-Harbi	15					
	(Angola) Rui Silva	16					
	(United States) Lawrence Janesky	17					
	(France) Olivier Pernaut	18					
	(Spain) José María Cami	19					
	(France) Philippe Boutron	20					
	(France) Heathcliff Zingraf	22					
	(France) Florent Vayssade	24					
	(Spain) Domingo Román	25					
	(Spain) Carlos Santaolalla	28					
	(New Zealand) Robert Knight	30					
	(Portugal) Hélder Oliveira				Ret		
	(France) Aurélien Bouchet				Ret		
	(Argentina) Manuel Andújar			Ret			
	(Portugal) Luís Portela Morais		Ret				
	(Austria) Matthias Walkner		Ret				
	(Portugal) Gonçalo Guerreiro	Ret					
	(Saudi Arabia) Saleh Al-Saif	Ret					
	(Spain) Gerard Farrés	Ret					
	(France) Adrien Choblet	Ret					
	(Saudi Arabia) Abdullah Al-Shegawi	Ret					
	(Saudi Arabia) Hamza Bakhashab	Ret					
	(France) David Casteu	Ret					
	(Portugal) Bruno Martins	Ret					
	(Saudi Arabia) Abdullah Al-Fahhad	Ret					
Pos.	Driver	DAK (Saudi Arabia)	PRT (Portugal)	ARG (Argentina)	MOR (Morocco)	ABU (United Arab Emirates)	Points

Pos.	Driver	DAK (Saudi Arabia)	PRT (Portugal)	ARG (Argentina)	MOR (Morocco)	ABU (United Arab Emirates)	Points
1	(Argentina) Gonzalo Rinaldi	5^{30+40}	3^{25+17}	DSQ	3^{25+20}		157
2	(Lithuania) Ernestas Česokas	21^{13+1}	7^{20+8}	1^{30+21}	9^{20+15}		128
3	(Portugal) Nuno Morais	4^{40+34}	2^{30+19}				123
4	(United States) Jacob Argubright	2^{50+40}					90
5	(Spain) Xavier Blanco	14^{15}	8^{17+4}	2^{25+18}	Ret^{1}		80
6	(Chile) Álvaro Leon	6^{26+33}					59
7	(Spain) Oriol Mena				1^{30+23}		53
8	(Portugal) Valter Cardoso		12^{15+19}				34
9	(Argentina) Andrés Frini	7^{23+6}					29
10	(France) Xavier Flick				10^{17+10}		27
11	(United States) Jeremy Gray	27^{7+17}					24
12	(Poland) Marcin Sienkiewicz	9^{20}					20
13	(Netherlands) Wouter Rosegaar	12^{17}					17
14	(Portugal) Gonçalo Reis	23^{11+4}					15
15	(Poland) Maciej Giemza	26^{9}					9
16	(Portugal) Daniel Jordão	Ret^{2}					2
17	(Brazil) Daniel Spolidorio		Ret^{1}	Ret^{1}			2
18	(Portugal) Bernardo Oliveira	Ret^{2}					2
19	(Italy) Paolo Ceci				Ret^{1}		1
Co-Drivers ineligible for championship points
	(Portugal) Joel Lutas		1				
	(United States) Max Eddy	1					
	(France) Jérémy Tricaud		4		2		
	(Portugal) Arcélio Couto		6	3			
	(France) Martin Bonnet	3					
	(Spain) Javier Ventaja				4		
	(France) Rodrigue Relmy-Madinska				5		
	(Portugal) João Miranda		5				
	(Mexico) Abelardo Ruanova				6		
	(Saudi Arabia) Meshal Al-Shammari				7		
	(Italy) Antonio Anghileri				8		
	(Norway) Ola Fløene	8					
	(Portugal) Rui Paulo		9				
	(Portugal) José Sá Pires		10				
	(France) Delphine Delfino	10					
	(Slovakia) Radovan Schneider				11		
	(Spain) Santiago Ramiro		11				
	(Spain) Pol Ros	11					
	(France) Axelle Domas				12		
	(Czech Republic) Miroslav Losos				13		
	(Portugal) Gonçalo Reis		13				
	(Lithuania) Artur Ardavicius	13					
	(France) Vincent Ferri				14		
	(United Arab Emirates) Ali Mirza	15					
	(Angola) Francisco Albuquerque	16					
	(South Africa) Dennis Murphy	17					
	(France) Benjamin Riviere	18					
	(Spain) Cristian Cami	19					
	(France) Mayeul Barbet	20					
	(France) Eric Bersey	22					
	(France) Nicolas Rey	24					
	(Spain) Óscar Bravo	25					
	(Spain) Aran Sol	28					
	(France) Peter Serra	29					
	Alexey Kuzmich	30					
	(Portugal) Carlos Mendes				Ret		
	(France) Elisa Huguenin				Ret		
	(Argentina) Andrés Frini			Ret			
	(Portugal) David Megre		Ret				
	(Austria) Oliver Pyerin		Ret				
	(Brazil) Maykel Justo	Ret					
	(Lithuania) Albert Veliamovič	Ret					
	(Spain) Toni Vingut	Ret					
	(France) Laurent Magat	Ret					
	(Saudi Arabia) Raed Al-Assaf	Ret					
	(Saudi Arabia) Fahed Al-Amr	Ret					
	(France) François Bonnet	Ret					
	(Portugal) Eurico Adão	Ret					
	(South Africa) Leander Pienaar	Ret					
Pos.	Driver	DAK (Saudi Arabia)	PRT (Portugal)	ARG (Argentina)	MOR (Morocco)	ABU (United Arab Emirates)	Points

== FIM World Rally-Raid Championship ==
- Only riders competing in the RallyGP category are eligible for the FIM Rally-Raid World Championship. World Cup titles are available for champions of the Rally2, Rally3, and Quad categories.

=== Entry list ===
RallyGP Teams & Riders
Constructor	Team	Rider	Rounds
Hero	(India) Hero MotoSports Team Rally	(Botswana) Ross Branch	1–3
Hero	(India) Hero MotoSports Team Rally	(Chile) José Ignacio Cornejo	1–4
Honda	(Japan) Monster Energy Honda HRC	(Spain) Tosha Schareina	1–4
Honda	(Japan) Monster Energy Honda HRC	(France) Adrien Van Beveren	1–4
Honda	(Japan) Monster Energy Honda HRC	(United States) Ricky Brabec	1–4
Honda	(Japan) Monster Energy Honda HRC	(United States) Skyler Howes	1–3
KTM	(Austria) Red Bull KTM Factory Racing	(Australia) Daniel Sanders	1–4
KTM	(Austria) Red Bull KTM Factory Racing	(Argentina) Luciano Benavides	1–4
KTM	(Austria) Red Bull KTM Factory Racing	(Spain) Edgar Canet	1–4
KTM	(France) Wega - Dumontier Racing Team	(France) Romain Dumontier	3
Sherco	(France) Sherco TVS Rally Factory	(South Africa) Bradley Cox	3
ZXMOTO	(China) ZXMOTO Joyride Factory Rally Team	(United States) Skyler Howes	4
Rally2 Teams & Riders
Constructor	Team	Rider	Rounds
Fantic	(United Arab Emirates) Desert Storm	(Lebanon) Ehab Al-Hakeem	1
Fantic	(Argentina) Fantic by MED Racing Team	(Argentina) Diego Duplessis	3
Fantic	(Argentina) Fantic by MED Racing Team	(Argentina) Julián Sánchez	3
Fantic	(Argentina) Fantic by MED Racing Team	(United States) Ryan Nariño	3
Fantic	(United Kingdom) Happy Rally	(United Kingdom) Mark Harfield	3
Fantic		(Italy) Antonio Posati	4
Gas Gas	(France) Challenger Racing Team	(France) Charlie Herbst	1
Gas Gas	(France) Challenger Racing Team	(United States) Philip Howard	4
Gas Gas	(France) Nomade Racing	(France) Guillaume Jaunin	1
Gas Gas	(France) Aubmoto	(France) Stéphane Joly	2
Gas Gas	(Brazil) Full Gas	(Brazil) Wesley Macedo	3
Gas Gas	(Spain) Pedregà Team	(Mexico) Adolfo Alonso	3
Gas Gas	(France) RS Concept	(France) Guillaume Hucher	4
Gas Gas	(France) RS Concept	(France) Wilfried Dagommer	4
Gas Gas	(Spain) Peñita Factory Team	(Spain) Íñigo Moreno	4
Hero	(India) Hero MotoSports Team Rally	(Austria) Tobias Ebster	1
Hero	(India) Hero MotoSports Team Rally	(South Africa) Michael Docherty	3–4
Hero	(India) Hero MotoSports Team Rally	(India) Shlok Ghorpade	4
Honda	(Japan) Monster Energy Honda HRC	(Portugal) Martim Ventura	1–4
Honda	(Japan) Monster Energy Honda HRC	(United States) Preston Campbell	1–4
Honda	(Japan) Monster Energy Honda HRC	(Brazil) Bruno Crivilin	3–4
Honda	(Netherlands) HT Rally Raid	(Lithuania) Nerimantas Jucius	1
Honda	(Netherlands) HT Rally Raid	(Chile) Ruy Barbosa	1, 4
Honda	(Netherlands) HT Rally Raid	(Lithuania) Dovydas Karka	1
Honda	(Netherlands) HT Rally Raid	(Poland) Robert Przybyłowski	1
Honda	(Netherlands) HT Rally Raid	(Germany) Markus Hertlein	1
Honda	(Netherlands) HT Rally Raid	(Netherlands) Ian Olthof	1
Honda	(Netherlands) HT Rally Raid	(Argentina) Puchi Ontiveros	3
Honda	(Netherlands) HT Rally Raid	(Netherlands) Rene Boer	3
Honda	(Netherlands) HT Rally Raid	(Canada) Jack Lundin	3
Honda	(Netherlands) HT Rally Raid	(Poland) Marek Halamunda	3–4
Honda	(Netherlands) HT Rally Raid	(South Africa) Nico de Waal	3
Honda	(Netherlands) HT Rally Raid	(Zambia) Scott Heygate	4
Honda	(Netherlands) HT Rally Raid	(Netherlands) Berend de Ruiter	4
Honda	(Netherlands) HT Rally Raid	(Puerto Rico) Omar Caraballo	4
Honda	(Netherlands) HT Rally Raid	(United States) Christopher King	4
Honda	(Italy) RS Moto HRC Race Service	(Italy) Paolo Lucci	1
Honda	(Italy) RS Moto HRC Race Service	(Japan) Shinya Fujiwara	1
Honda	(Italy) RS Moto Rally Team	(Italy) Cesare Zacchetti	1
Honda	(Italy) RS Moto Rally Team	(Lebanon) Rafic Eid	1
Honda	(Italy) RS Moto Rally Team	(Italy) Raffaella Cabini	2, 4
Honda	(Italy) RS Moto Rally Team	(Indonesia) Mufti Muis Karim	4
Honda	(Italy) RS Moto Rally Team	(Italy) Iarno D'Orsogna	3
Honda	(Italy) A.S.D. Orso Aficano	(Italy) Iarno D'Orsogna	4
Honda	(Belgium) Anquety Motorsport	(Belgium) Jérôme Martiny	1
Honda	(United Kingdom) Team Ikuzawa	(United Kingdom) Neil Hawker	1
Honda	(Italy) Rally POV	(Italy) Tiziano Interno	1
Honda	(France) Ydeo Compétition	(France) Damien Gueno	4
Honda	(Portugal) Wingmotor	(Portugal) Gonçalo Amaral	4
Honda	(Portugal) Wingmotor	(Portugal) Salvador Amaral	4
Hoto	(China) Hoto Factory Racing	(China) Shi Haoyu	1
Husqvarna	(Italy) Solarys Racing	(Italy) Tommaso Montanari	1
Husqvarna	(Portugal) BS - Frutas Patricia Pilar	(Portugal) Bruno Santos	1
Husqvarna	(Spain) Xraids Experience	(Portugal) Bruno Santos	2
Husqvarna	(Spain) Pedregà Team	(Spain) Josep Pedró	1
Husqvarna	(Spain) Pedregà Team	(Spain) Joan Guillén	1
Husqvarna	(Spain) Pedregà Team	(Mexico) Armando Alonso	3
Husqvarna	(Spain) Melilla Ciudad del Deporte	(Spain) Rachid Al-Lal	1
Husqvarna	(Spain) Melilla Ciudad del Deporte	(Spain) Borja Pérez	1
Husqvarna	(Lithuania) AG Rally Dubai Alfafence	(Lithuania) Saulius Klevinskas	1
Husqvarna	(Slovenia) Team Marčič	(Slovenia) Simon Marčič	1
Husqvarna	(Spain) Motoclub Albacete	(Spain) Juan Carlos Torres	1
Husqvarna	(United Kingdom) S2D Race Team	(United Kingdom) Craig Searles	1
Husqvarna	(United Kingdom) S2D Race Team	(United Kingdom) Carl Searles	1
Husqvarna	(France) LB Racing	(France) Ludwig Messager	1
Husqvarna	(France) Nomade Racing	(France) Charles Pick	1
Husqvarna	(France) Nomade Racing	(France) Mathieu Feuvrier	4
Husqvarna	(Portugal) Old Friends Rally Team	(Portugal) Pedro Pinheiro	1, 3–4
Husqvarna	(United Kingdom) Happy Rally	(United Kingdom) Neil Corbishley	3
Husqvarna		(Republic of Ireland) Gary Ennis	3
Husqvarna	(Spain) Ottomoción	(Spain) Adrian Peñarrubia	4
Husqvarna	(Spain) Ottomoción	(Spain) Juan Jesús Sánchez	4
Husqvarna	(Spain) Ottomoción	(Spain) Antonio Sánchez	4
Husqvarna	(France) Challenger Racing Team	(France) Mickaël Tendron	4
Husqvarna	(Belgium) Soul & Nature	(Belgium) Jurgen van Rompaey	4
Husqvarna		(Italy) Alessandro Rigoni	4
Kove	(China) Kove Factory Racing	(France) Neels Theric	1–2, 4
Kove	(China) Kove Factory Racing	(China) Sunier Sunier	1, 4
Kove	(China) Kove Factory Racing	(France) Lili-May Mansuy	2
Kove	(United States) L3R	(France) Lili-May Mansuy	4
Kove	(Czech Republic) Orion - Moto Racing Group	(Czech Republic) Milan Engel	1
Kove	(Czech Republic) Orion - Moto Racing Group	(Poland) Bartlomiej Tabin	1
Kove	(United Kingdom) Muc-Off Racing	(United Kingdom) James Hillier	1
Kove	(United Arab Emirates) Desert Storm	(India) Jatin Jain	1–4
Kove	(United Arab Emirates) Desert Storm	(Saudi Arabia) Badr Al-Hamdan	1
Kove	(Spain) Pont Grup - Kove	(Spain) Javi Vega	1, 4
Kove	(Italy) Kove Italia Racing Team	(Italy) Andrea Gava	1
Kove	(Portugal) Mário Patrão Adventure	(Portugal) Tiago Santos	2, 4
Kove	(Switzerland) Edelweiss Racing Team	(Switzerland) Lucas Secco	2
Kove	(Switzerland) Edelweiss Racing Team	(Switzerland) Marc Sutter	2
Kove	Kove Argentina	(Argentina) Jeremías Pascual	3
Kove	Kove Argentina	(Argentina) Benjamin Pascual	3
Kove		(Argentina) Matías José Felippa	3
Kove	(Italy) Plastik Dreamer	(Italy) Fabio Bernardini	3
Kove	(France) GP Sandstorm Racing Team	(France) Guillaume Pouget	4
Kove	(Italy) Moto Club Lago d'Iseo	(Italy) Filippo Perletti	4
Kove	(France) Piboules Racing	(France) Philippe Dasse	4
Kove	(France) Piboules Racing	(France) Philippe Peillon	4
Kove	(France) Piboules Racing	(France) Eymeric Bource	4
Kove	(Spain) Pedregà Team	(Italy) Federico Marretta	4
Kove	(Spain) Pedregà Team	(Spain) Arnau Mateu	4
Kove	(Czech Republic) BRA-TRA	(Czech Republic) Milan Brabec	4
Kove	(France) Belettes du Désert	(France) Sara Jugla	4
Kove	(France) EvolutionSportMoto	(France) Renaud Respaud	4
Kove	(Morocco) Elhaj	(Morocco) Ali Elhaj	4
Kove	(France) Challenger Racing Team	(Switzerland) Lucas Secco	4
KTM	(Netherlands) BAS World KTM Team	(South Africa) Michael Docherty	1
KTM	(Netherlands) BAS World KTM Team	(Slovenia) Toni Mulec	1–4
KTM	(Netherlands) BAS World KTM Team	(France) Mathieu Doveze	1, 4
KTM	(Netherlands) BAS World KTM Team	(Mongolia) Khaliunbold Erdenebileg	1
KTM	(Netherlands) BAS World KTM Team	(Guatemala) Francisco Arredondo	1, 4
KTM	(Netherlands) BAS World KTM Team	(Czech Republic) Jiri Broz	1, 4
KTM	(Netherlands) BAS World KTM Team	(United States) Brandon Krause	1
KTM	(Netherlands) BAS World KTM Team	(Poland) Filip Grot	1
KTM	(Netherlands) BAS World KTM Team	(United States) Nathan Rafferty	1
KTM	(Netherlands) BAS World KTM Team	(Chile) Tomás de Gavardo	1–4
KTM	(Netherlands) BAS World KTM Team	(Poland) Jacek Bartoszek	2
KTM	(Netherlands) BAS World KTM Team	(Brazil) Richard Fliter	3–4
KTM	(Netherlands) BAS World KTM Team	(Mongolia) Batmunkh Bayarsaikhan	3
KTM	(Netherlands) BAS World KTM Team	(Chile) Sebastian Pakciarz	4
KTM	(Netherlands) BAS World KTM Team	(Italy) Paolo Lucci	4
KTM	(Netherlands) BAS World KTM Team	(Netherlands) Lars van Berkel	4
KTM	(Netherlands) BAS World KTM Team	(Ukraine) Anatolii Haval	4
KTM	(Poland) DUUST Rally Team	(Poland) Konrad Dąbrowski	1, 4
KTM	(Poland) DUUST Rally Team	(Lithuania) Dovydas Karka	4
KTM	(Poland) DUUST Rally Team	(France) Jean-Loup Lepan	4
KTM	(Poland) DUUST Rally Team	(Poland) Tomasz Orwat	4
KTM	(Poland) DUUST Rally Team	(Poland) Sławomir Sypień	4
KTM	(Spain) Joyride Race Service	(Argentina) Leonardo Cola	1
KTM	(Spain) Joyride Race Service	(China) Zhao Hongyi	1
KTM	(Spain) Joyride Race Service	(China) Zhang Min	1
KTM	(Spain) Joyride Race Service	(Germany) Dennis Mildenberger	1
KTM	(Spain) Joyride Race Service	(Australia) David Brock	1, 4
KTM	(Spain) Joyride Race Service	(Spain) Iñigo Zardoya	1, 3
KTM	(Spain) Joyride Race Service	(Spain) Martí Escofet	2–4
KTM	(Spain) Joyride Race Service	(Belgium) Mathieu Liebaert	3
KTM	(Spain) Joyride Race Service	(Spain) Joan Viñals	3–4
KTM	(Spain) Joyride Race Service	(Slovenia) Taj Karo	4
KTM	(Spain) Joyride Race Service	(Israel) Alona Ben-Natan	4
KTM	(Spain) Xraids Experience	(Argentina) Juan Santiago Rostan	1, 3–4
KTM	(Spain) Xraids Experience	(France) Guillaume Chollet	1
KTM	(Spain) Xraids Experience	(Mongolia) Murun Purevdorj	1
KTM	(Spain) Xraids Experience	(United Kingdom) Robbie Wallace	1
KTM	(Spain) Xraids Experience	(Netherlands) Jeremy Knuiman	2
KTM	(Spain) Xraids Experience	(Spain) Alfredo Pellicer	2–4
KTM	(Spain) Xraids Experience	(Portugal) Micael Simão	2
KTM	(Spain) Xraids Experience	(Chile) John Medina	2–3
KTM	(Spain) Xraids Experience	(Chile) Benjamín Herrera	3–4
KTM	(Spain) Xraids Experience	(Argentina) Sebastian Urquia	3
KTM	(Spain) Xraids Experience	(Uruguay) Fabian von Thüngen	3–4
KTM	(Spain) Xraids Experience	(Peru) Israel Borrell	3
KTM	(Spain) Xraids Experience	(Spain) Dominique Cizeau	3
KTM	(Czech Republic) Cajdašrot Dakar Team	(Czech Republic) Dušan Drdaj	1–2
KTM	(Czech Republic) Cajdašrot Dakar Team	(Czech Republic) Libor Pletka	2, 4
KTM	(Denmark) TKR	(Denmark) Thomas Kongshøj	1
KTM	(Romania) Autonet Motorcycle Team	(Romania) Emanuel Gyenes	1
KTM	(Saudi Arabia) HLeem	(Saudi Arabia) Abdulhalim Al-Mogeera	1
KTM	(Saudi Arabia) HLeem	(Saudi Arabia) Ahmed Al-Jaber	
KTM	(Czech Republic) SP Moto Bohemia Racing Team	(Czech Republic) David Pabiška	1–2, 4
KTM	(France) Team Universal Ride	(France) Jérôme Bas	1
KTM	(France) Esprit KTM	(France) Benjamin Melot	1, 4
KTM	(France) Esprit KTM	(France) Romain Bouzigon	1
KTM	(France) Challenger Racing Team	(Brazil) Luciano Gomes	1, 4
KTM	(France) Challenger Racing Team	(France) Louis Trelluyer	4
KTM	(France) Challenger Racing Team	(France) Jules Fourgeaud	4
KTM	(France) Challenger Racing Team	(France) Stéphane Brunaud	4
KTM	(France) Challenger Racing Team	(United States) Matthew Ransom	4
KTM	(France) Challenger Racing Team	(United States) Justin Jumet	4
KTM	DNA Filters - Enduro Greece Rally Team	(Greece) Vasileios Boudros	1
KTM		(France) Antoine Detourbet	1
KTM	(France) Jauffraud Racing Team	(France) Matthieu Jauffraud	1
KTM	(France) Team Casteu Trophy	(France) Bertrand Domet	1
KTM	(France) Team Casteu Trophy	(Switzerland) Alexandre Vaudan	1
KTM	(Czech Republic) Moto Racing Krasne Pole	(Czech Republic) Martin Prokeš	1
KTM	(Portugal) Old Friends Rally Team	(Portugal) Nuno Silva	1, 3
KTM	(Portugal) Old Friends Rally Team	(Spain) Ricardo Lastra	1
KTM	(Spain) Pedregà Team	(Spain) Arnau Lledó	1, 4
KTM	(Spain) Pedregà Team	(Spain) Mario Garrido	1
KTM	(Spain) Pedregà Team	(Spain) Carlos López	1
KTM	(Spain) Pedregà Team	(Italy) Alessandro Rigoni	3
KTM	(Spain) Pedregà Team	(Spain) Bruno Bozzo	4
KTM	(Spain) Pedregà Team	(Italy) Peter Gurndin	4
KTM	(Spain) Pedregà Team	(Spain) Ricardo Iglesias	4
KTM	(Spain) Pedregà Team	(Italy) Matteo Zoppas	4
KTM	(France) TB Racing	(France) Thierry Bethys	1
KTM	(Lithuania) Hiltus - AG Rally Dubai	(Lithuania) Edvard Sokolovski	1
KTM	(France) Nomade Racing	(France) Christopher Jautard	1
KTM	(France) Nomade Racing	(France) Nicolas Horeaux	1, 4
KTM	(France) Nomade Racing	(France) Rémy Moreau	1
KTM	(France) Nomade Racing	(France) Matthieu Cauvin	1
KTM	(France) Nomade Racing	(France) Thibault Boucherot	1
KTM	(France) Nomade Racing	(South Africa) Ronald Venter	1
KTM	(France) Nomade Racing	(France) Noa Sainct	4
KTM	(France) Nomade Racing	(France) Guillaume Martin	4
KTM	(France) Nomade Racing	(France) Patrick Arnoult	4
KTM	(Germany) Maxi Schek Motorsport	(Germany) Maxi Schek	1
KTM	(Lithuania) AG Rally Dubai	(Lithuania) Gediminas Satkus	1
KTM	(France) Live in a Rear Wheel	(France) Benjamin Pousset	1
KTM	(Italy) Solarys Racing	(Italy) Mattia Riva	1
KTM	(Italy) Solarys Racing	(Italy) Alberto Greppi Cappa	4
KTM	(Spain) Cuenca Diputacion 2026	(Spain) Fernando Domínguez	1
KTM	(France) 22 Tout Terrain	(France) Mathieu Troquier	1
KTM	(France) Aubmoto	(France) Thomas Zoldos	2
KTM	(Spain) Club Aventura Touareg	(Spain) Antonio Ubis	2, 4
KTM	(Spain) Club Aventura Touareg	(Spain) Gines Belzunces	4
KTM	(Italy) Roadab SSD	(Italy) Nicola Raspa	2, 4
KTM	(Italy) Roadab SSD	(Italy) Domenico Cipollone	2
KTM	(Argentina) Fantic by MED Racing Team	(Argentina) Christopher Beas	3
KTM		(United Kingdom) Jack Fielder	3
KTM	(Spain) Peñita Factory Team	(Spain) Urko Garmendia	4
KTM	(Spain) Peñita Factory Team	(Spain) Iñigo Zardoya	4
KTM	(Spain) Peñita Factory Team	(Spain) Álvaro Pintado	4
KTM	(Czech Republic) Bo!Beton Team	(Czech Republic) Roman Krejčí	4
KTM	(France) Horizon Moto 95	(France) Valentin Sertilhanges	4
KTM	(Italy) Budino Racing	(Italy) Luca Corradini	4
KTM	(Finland) Artic Foxes	(Finland) Atte Kukkonen	4
KTM	(Finland) Artic Foxes	(Finland) Jake Vainio	4
KTM	(Canada) Nomadik and Co	(Canada) Anthony Bonello	4
KTM	(France) RS Concept	(France) François-Xavier Maillard	4
KTM	(France) RS Concept	(France) Guillaume Rosier	4
KTM	(Morocco) Elhaj	(Morocco) Mohamed Aoulad Ali	4
KTM	(United Arab Emirates) Desert Storm	(Saudi Arabia) Mohammed Al-Muaikil	4
Rieju	(Spain) Pedregà Team	(Spain) August Castellá	3–4
RVM	(Spain) Xraids Experience	(Argentina) Baltazar Frezze	3–4
RVM	(Argentina) RVM Racing Team	(Argentina) Joaquin Debeljuh	3
RVM	(Argentina) 55Racing	(Argentina) Gabriel Mana	3
Sherco	(France) Sherco TVS Rally Factory	(India) Harith Noah	1, 4
Yamaha		(France) Florian Bancilhon	1
Yamaha	(Argentina) Fantic by MED Racing Team	(Brazil) Vitor Reis	3
ZXMOTO	(China) ZXMOTO Joyride Factory Rally Team	(Austria) Tobias Ebster	4
Rally3 Teams & Riders
Constructor	Team	Rider	Rounds
Beta	(France) Raw Motorsports	(France) Steve Pasco	2
Honda	(Portugal) Wingmotor	(Portugal) Gonçalo Amaral	2
Honda	(Portugal) Wingmotor	(Portugal) Salvador Amaral	2
Husqvarna	(Morocco) Ytri Racing Team	(Morocco) Amnay Hajji	4
KTM	(Spain) Xraids Experience	(Mongolia) Murun Purevdorj	2–4
KTM	(Spain) Xraids Experience	(Argentina) Eduardo Alan	2–4
KTM		(Hungary) Richárd Hodola	2
KTM	(Spain) Pedregà Team	(Hungary) Richárd Hodola	4
KTM	(Spain) Pedregà Team	(Costa Rica) Walter Alfaro	3
KTM	(Spain) Visit Sant Antoni - Ibiza	(Spain) Toni Vingut	4
KTM	(France) Fuze Factory	(France) Julien Favarel	4
KTM	(France) Challenger Racing Team	(France) Pierre Roques	4
Triumph	Triumph Spain	(Spain) Albert Martín	4
Quad Teams & Riders
Constructor	Team	Rider	Rounds
Can-Am	(Argentina) LD Racing Team	(Argentina) Lucas Domínguez	3
Can-Am	(Argentina) Pampa Rental Rally Team	(Argentina) Santiago Eduardo Rostan	3
Can-Am	(Bolivia) Team Can-Am Martínez	(Bolivia) Leonardo Martínez	3–4
Can-Am	(Bolivia) Team Can-Am Martínez	(Bolivia) Suany Martínez	3–4
CFMoto	(Lithuania) CFMoto Thunder Racing Team	(Lithuania) Antanas Kanopkinas	2–4
CFMoto	(Lithuania) CFMoto Thunder Racing Team	(Lithuania) Adomas Gančierius	2
Yamaha	Senegal National Team	(Senegal) Alexis Varagne	2–3
Yamaha	(Argentina) Fantic by MED Racing Team	(Argentina) Tobías Carrizo	3
Yamaha	(Argentina) Kot Pro Mechanic	(Argentina) Isidro Fernandez	3

=== RallyGP Riders' & Manufacturers' championships ===
Pos.	Rider	DAK (Saudi Arabia)	PRT (Portugal)	ARG (Argentina)	MOR (Morocco)	ABU (United Arab Emirates)	Points
1	(Australia) Daniel Sanders	5^{17}	1^{25}	1^{25}	2^{20}		87
2	(Argentina) Luciano Benavides	1^{38}	6^{10}	4^{13}	4^{13}		74
3	(Spain) Tosha Schareina	3^{24}	2^{20}	2^{20}	6^{10}		74
4	(United States) Ricky Brabec	2^{30}	8^{8}	3^{16}	3^{16}		70
5	(Spain) Edgar Canet	11^{11}	4^{13}	7^{9}	1^{25}		58
6	(France) Adrien Van Beveren	6^{15}	3^{16}	6^{10}	5^{11}		52
7	(United States) Skyler Howes	4^{20}	7^{9}	5^{11}	9^{8}		48
8	(Botswana) Ross Branch	8^{12}	5^{11}	8^{8}			31
9	(Chile) José Ignacio Cornejo	7^{14}	Ret	9^{7}	7^{9}		30
	(South Africa) Bradley Cox			Ret			0
	(France) Romain Dumontier			Ret			0
Riders ineligible for championship points
	(Spain) Lorenzo Santolino	Ret		10	8		
	(South Africa) Bradley Cox	9			Ret		
	(United States) Mason Klein	10					
	(United Arab Emirates) Mohammed Albalooshi	Ret					
	(Czech Republic) Martin Michek	Ret					
	(Slovakia) Štefan Svitko	Ret					
Pos.	Rider	DAK (Saudi Arabia)	PRT (Portugal)	ARG (Argentina)	MOR (Morocco)	ABU (United Arab Emirates)	Points

Pos.	Manufacturer	DAK (Saudi Arabia)	PRT (Portugal)	ARG (Argentina)	MOR (Morocco)	ABU (United Arab Emirates)	Points
1	(Austria) KTM	55	38	38	45		176
2	(Japan) Honda	54	36	36	27		153
3	(India) Hero	26	11	15	9		61
Pos.	Manufacturer	DAK (Saudi Arabia)	PRT (Portugal)	ARG (Argentina)	MOR (Morocco)	ABU (United Arab Emirates)	Points

=== Rally2 Riders' & Teams' championships ===
Pos.	Rider	DAK (Saudi Arabia)	PRT (Portugal)	ARG (Argentina)	MOR (Morocco)	ABU (United Arab Emirates)	Points
1	(Portugal) Martim Ventura	3	2	1	1		94
2	(Slovenia) Toni Mulec	1	5	3	5		76
3	(United States) Preston Campbell	2	7	4	3		68
4	(Portugal) Bruno Santos	7	1				39
5	(Brazil) Bruno Crivilin			2	6		30
6	(France) Neels Theric	Ret	3		4		29
7	(Spain) Alfredo Pellicer		6	5	10		27
8	(South Africa) Michael Docherty	77		Ret	2		22
9	(Poland) Konrad Dąbrowski	4			15		21
10	(Lithuania) Nerimantas Jucius	5					17
11	(Mongolia) Khaliunbold Erdenebileg	6					15
12	(Spain) Martí Escofet		10	8	Ret		14
13	(Portugal) Micael Simão		4				13
14	(Chile) Benjamín Herrera			6	13		13
15	(France) Benjamin Melot	8			19		13
16	(Chile) Tomás de Gavardo	16	11	11	21		13
17	(Spain) Josep Pedró	9					11
18	(Lithuania) Dovydas Karka	13			11		10
19	(Spain) Bruno Bozzo				7		9
20	(Argentina) Jeremías Pascual			7			9
21	(Italy) Paolo Lucci	76			9		9
22	(Czech Republic) Milan Engel	10					9
23	(Chile) Ruy Barbosa	Ret			8		8
24	(Netherlands) Jeremy Knuiman		8				8
25	(Italy) Tommaso Montanari	11					8
26	(Argentina) Diego Duplessis			9			7
27	(France) Thomas Zoldos		9				7
28	(Argentina) Baltazar Frezze			10	22		7
29	(Czech Republic) Dušan Drdaj	29	12				6
30	(Belgium) Jérôme Martiny	12					6
31	(Czech Republic) David Pabiška	25	13		26		6
32	(Argentina) Juan Santiago Rostan	22		13	25		6
33	(Spain) Iñigo Zardoya	36		14	29		5
34	(France) Mathieu Dovèze	Ret			12		4
35	(Netherlands) Rene Boer			12			4
36	(France) Jérôme Bas	14					3
37	(Spain) Antonio Ubis		14		50		3
38	(Spain) Javi Vega	18			20		3
39	(China) Sunier Sunier	24			34		3
40	(Portugal) Nuno Silva	74		27			3
41	(Guatemala) Francisco Arredondo	70			57		3
42	(France) Jean-Loup Lepan				14		2
43	(Portugal) Tiago Santos		15		71		2
44	(Romania) Emanuel Gyenes	15					2
45	(Chile) John Medina		17	25			2
46	(Portugal) Pedro Pinheiro	Ret		19	37		2
47	(Poland) Marek Halamunda			23	46		2
48	(Spain) Joan Viñals			30	58		2
49	(France) Lili-May Mansuy		16		66		2
50	(Italy) Raffaella Cabini		18		72		2
51	(Italy) Alessandro Rigoni			20	82		2
52	(France) Matthieu Jauffraud	53					2
53	(France) Antoine Detourbet	51					2
54	(Slovenia) Simon Marčič	79					2
55	(Australia) David Brock	72			Ret		2
56	(France) Thibault Boucherot	49					2
57	(France) Bertrand Domet	42					2
58	(Mongolia) Murun Purevdorj	19					2
59	(Lithuania) Gediminas Satkus	67					2
60	(Greece) Vasileios Boudros	39					2
61	(Germany) Markus Hertlein	56					2
62	(Spain) August Castellá			37	69		2
63	(Spain) Juan Carlos Torres	71					2
64	(Lithuania) Saulius Klevinskas	33					2
65	(France) Matthieu Cauvin	23					2
66	(United States) Nathan Rafferty	45					2
67	(Spain) Carlos López	37					2
68	(United Kingdom) Robbie Wallace	32					2
69	(Poland) Filip Grot	40					2
70	(France) Florian Bancilhon	27					2
71	(Switzerland) Alexandre Vaudan	17					2
72	(Netherlands) Ian Olthof	30					2
73	(Switzerland) Dennis Mildenberger	64					2
74	(France) Charlie Herbst	20					2
75	(United Kingdom) Craig Searles	61					2
76	(China) Shi Haoyu	78					2
77	(Italy) Andrea Gava	28					2
78	(United Kingdom) Neil Hawker	46					2
79	(Spain) Rachid Al-Lal	55					2
80	(Spain) Borja Pérez	63					2
81	(United Kingdom) Carl Searles	62					2
82	(France) Mathieu Troquier	41					2
83	(China) Zhang Min	35					2
84	(Spain) Joan Carles Guillén	48					2
85	(Italy) Cesare Zacchetti	47					2
86	(France) Christophe Jautard	50					2
87	(Denmark) Thomas Kongshøj	38					2
88	(China) Zhao Hongyi	43					2
89	(France) Ludwig Messager	60					2
90	(Germany) Maxi Schek	21					2
91	(France) Charles Pick	54					2
92	(Argentina) Leonardo Cola	31					2
93	(Saudi Arabia) Abdulhalim Al-Mogheera	75					2
94	(France) Guillaume Jaunin	68					2
95	(Spain) Fernando Domínguez	73					2
96	(France) Thierry Bethys	65					2
97	(Spain) Mario Garrido	58					2
98	(France) Rémy Moreau	57					2
99	(Italy) Tiziano Interno	26					2
100	(Italy) Mattia Riva	52					2
101	(Lebanon) Rafic Eid	34					2
102	(Japan) Shinya Fujiwara	44					2
103	(France) Romain Bouzigon	66					2
104	(France) Benjamin Pousset	69					2
105	(Poland) Robert Przybyłowski	59					2
106	(Belgium) Mathieu Liebaert			15			1
107	(Chile) Sebastian Pakciarz				16		1
108	(Netherlands) Lars van Berkel				17		1
109	(India) Harith Noah	Ret			18		1
110	(Netherlands) Berend de Ruiter				23		1
111	(Czech Republic) Roman Krejčí				24		1
112	(Slovenia) Taj Karo				27		1
113	(France) Guillaume Pouget				28		1
114	(France) Louis Trelluyer				30		1
115	(France) Valentin Sertilhanges				31		1
116	(Zambia) Scott Heygate				32		1
117	(France) Damien Gueno				33		1
118	(France) Nicolas Horeaux	Ret			35		1
119	(France) Jules Fourgeaud				36		1
120	(Brazil) Richard Fliter			Ret	38		1
121	(France) Guillaume Hucher				39		1
122	(Portugal) Gonçalo Amaral				40		1
123	(Poland) Tomasz Orwat				41		1
124	(Portugal) Salvador Amaral				42		1
125	(Italy) Filippo Perletti				43		1
126	(France) Stéphane Brunaud				44		1
127	(Poland) Sławomir Sypień				45		1
128	(Czech Republic) Jiří Brož	Ret			47		0
129	(Spain) Álvaro Pintado				48		0
130	(Canada) Anthony Bonello				49		0
131	(France) Guillaume Martin				51		0
132	(United States) Matthew Ransom				52		0
133	(Finland) Atte Kukkonen				53		0
134	(Italy) Peter Gurndin				54		0
135	(Spain) Antonio Sánchez				55		0
136	(France) Mathieu Feuvrier				56		0
137	(Czech Republic) Milan Brabec				59		0
138	(Spain) Ricardo Iglesias				60		0
139	(France) Mickaël Tendron				61		0
140	(France) Wilfried Dagommer				62		0
141	(Italy) Federico Marretta				63		0
142	(Spain) Íñigo Moreno				64		0
143	(France) Philippe Dasse				65		0
144	(Italy) Matteo Zoppas				67		0
145	(Morocco) Mohamed Aoulad Ali				68		0
146	(Ukraine) Anatolii Haval				70		0
147	(Puerto Rico) Omar Caraballo				73		0
148	(France) Sara Jugla				74		0
149	(France) Patrick Arnoult				75		0
150	(United States) Justin Jumet				76		0
151	(Belgium) Jurgen van Rompaey				77		0
152	(Spain) Gines Belzunces				78		0
153	(Italy) Alberto Greppi Cappa				79		0
154	(Spain) Juan Jesús Sánchez				80		0
155	(Spain) Urko Garmendia				81		0
156	(Israel) Alona Ben-Natan				83		0
157	(France) Eymeric Bource				84		0
158	(Republic of Ireland) Gary Ennis			35			1
159	(Mexico) Armando Alonso			34			1
160	(Canada) Jack Lundin			28			1
161	(Italy) Nicola Raspa		19		Ret		1
162	(United States) Ryan Nariño			32			1
163	(Mexico) Adolfo Alonso			26			1
164	(Argentina) Matías José Felippa			39			1
165	(Argentina) Gabriel Mana			38			1
166	(United Kingdom) Mark Harfield			33			1
167	(Argentina) Puchi Ontiveros			16			1
168	(Poland) Jacek Bartoszek		20				1
169	(Spain) Dominique Cizeau			36			1
170	(Argentina) Joaquin Debeljuh			21			1
171	(Mongolia) Batmunkh Bayarsaikhan			17			1
172	(Peru) Israel Borrell			24			1
173	(Switzerland) Marc Sutter		22				1
174	(Italy) Iarno D'Orsogna			18	Ret		1
175	(Argentina) Sebastian Urquia			22			1
176	(Brazil) Vitor Reis			31			1
177	(Italy) Domenico Cipollone		21				1
178	(Italy) Fabio Bernardini			29			1
	(India) Jatin Jain	Ret	Ret	Ret	Ret		0
	(Brazil) Luciano Gomes	Ret			Ret		0
	(Spain) Arnau Lledó	Ret			Ret		0
	(Austria) Tobias Ebster	Ret			Ret		0
	(Czech Republic) Libor Pletka		Ret		Ret		0
	(Switzerland) Lucas Secco		Ret		Ret		0
	(Uruguay) Fabian von Thüngen			Ret	Ret		0
	(India) Shlok Ghorpade				Ret		0
	(France) Noa Sainct				Ret		0
	(Indonesia) Mufti Muis Karim				Ret		0
	(Spain) Arnau Mateu				Ret		0
	(Italy) Luca Corradini				Ret		0
	(France) Guillaume Rosier				Ret		0
	(France) Renaud Respaud				Ret		0
	(Spain) Adrian Peñarrubia				Ret		0
	(Italy) Antonio Posati				Ret		0
	(Morocco) Ali Elhaj				Ret		0
	(France) Philippe Peillon				Ret		0
	(France) François-Xavier Maillard				Ret		0
	(United States) Christopher King				Ret		0
	(United States) Philip Howard				Ret		0
	(Saudi Arabia) Mohammed Al-Muaikil				Ret		0
	(Finland) Jake Vainio				Ret		0
	(United Kingdom) Jack Fielder			Ret			0
	(United Kingdom) Neil Corbishley			Ret			0
	(South Africa) Nico de Waal			Ret			0
	(Argentina) Benjamín Pascual			Ret			0
	(Brazil) Wesley Macedo			Ret			0
	(Argentina) Julián Sánchez			Ret			0
	(Argentina) Christopher Beas			Ret			0
	(France) Stéphane Joly		Ret				0
	(Lebanon) Ehab Al-Hakeem	Ret					0
	(Poland) Bartłomiej Tabin	Ret					0
	(United Kingdom) James Hillier	Ret					0
	(Czech Republic) Martin Prokeš	Ret					0
	(France) Guillaume Chollet	Ret					0
	(United States) Brandon Krause	Ret					0
	(Saudi Arabia) Badr Al-Hamdan	Ret					0
	(Lithuania) Edvard Sokolovskij	Ret					0
	(Spain) Ricardo Lastra	Ret					0
	(South Africa) Ronald Venter	Ret					0
Pos.	Rider	DAK (Saudi Arabia)	PRT (Portugal)	ARG (Argentina)	MOR (Morocco)	ABU (United Arab Emirates)	Points

Pos.	Team	DAK (Saudi Arabia)	PRT (Portugal)	ARG (Argentina)	MOR (Morocco)	ABU (United Arab Emirates)	Points
1	(Japan) Monster Energy Honda HRC	54	29	45	41		169
2	(Netherlands) BAS World KTM Team	53	16	21	18		108
3	(Spain) Xraids Experience	16	38	21	9		84
4	(Netherlands) HT Rally Raid	22		5	9		36
5	(Spain) Pedrega Team	19		2	10		31
6	(China) Kove Factory Racing		17		14		31
7	(India) Hero Motosports Team Rally				20		20
8	(Spain) Joyride Race Service	4		10	2		16
9	(Argentina) Fantic by MED Racing Team			8			8
10	(Poland) DUUST Rally Team				7		7
11	(France) Team Nomade Racing	4			2		6
Pos.	Team	DAK (Saudi Arabia)	PRT (Portugal)	ARG (Argentina)	MOR (Morocco)	ABU (United Arab Emirates)	Points

=== Rally3 Riders' championship ===
Pos.	Rider	PRT (Portugal)	ARG (Argentina)	MOR (Morocco)	Points
1	(Mongolia) Murun Purevdorj	3	1	2	61
2	(Argentina) Eduardo Alan	2	2	6	50
3	(Spain) Albert Martín			1	25
4	(Portugal) Gonçalo Amaral	1			25
5	(Hungary) Richárd Hodola	4		5	24
6	(France) Julien Favarel			3	16
7	(Costa Rica) Walter Alfaro		3		16
8	(Morocco) Amnay Hajji			4	13
	(Spain) Toni Vingut			Ret	0
	(France) Pierre Roques			Ret	0
	(Portugal) Salvador Amaral	Ret			0
	(France) Steve Pasco	Ret			0
Pos.	Rider	PRT (Portugal)	ARG (Argentina)	MOR (Morocco)	Points

=== Quad Riders' championship ===
Pos.	Rider	PRT (Portugal)	ARG (Argentina)	MOR (Morocco)	ABU (United Arab Emirates)	Points
1	(Lithuania) Antanas Kanopkinas	1	4	1		63
2	(Bolivia) Leonardo Martinez		2	2		40
3	(Argentina) Lucas Domínguez		1			25
4	(Lithuania) Adomas Gančierius	2				20
5	(Senegal) Alexis Varagne	3	Ret			16
6	(Argentina) Isidro Fernandez		3			16
7	(Argentina) Santiago Eduardo Rostan		5			11
8	(Bolivia) Suany Martínez		6	Ret		10
	(Argentina) Tobías Carrizo		Ret			0
Pos.	Rider	PRT (Portugal)	ARG (Argentina)	MOR (Morocco)	ABU (United Arab Emirates)	Points

=== Women's Trophy championship ===
Pos.	Rider	DAK (Saudi Arabia)	PRT (Portugal)	ARG (Argentina)	MOR (Morocco)	ABU (United Arab Emirates)	Points
1	(France) Lili-May Mansuy		1		1		50
2	(Italy) Raffaella Cabini		2		2		40
3	(France) Sara Jugla				3		16
4	(Israel) Alona Ben-Natan				4		13
Pos.	Rider	DAK (Saudi Arabia)	PRT (Portugal)	ARG (Argentina)	MOR (Morocco)	ABU (United Arab Emirates)	Points

=== Rally2 Junior Trophy championship ===
Pos.	Rider	DAK (Saudi Arabia)	PRT (Portugal)	ARG (Argentina)	MOR (Morocco)	ABU (United Arab Emirates)	Points
1	(Spain) Alfredo Pellicer		1	1	2		70
2	(Poland) Konrad Dąbrowski	1			3		54
3	(Spain) Martí Escofet		3	3	Ret		36
4	(Poland) Filip Grot	2					30
5	(Spain) Bruno Bozzo				1		25
6	(Argentina) Baltazar Frezze			4	5		24
7	(China) Shi Haoyu	3					24
8	(Argentina) Jeremias Pascual			2			20
9	(Netherlands) Jeremy Knuiman		2				20
10	(Chile) Sebastian Pakciarz				4		13
11	(United States) Ryan Nariño			5			11
12	(Slovenia) Taj Karo				6		10
13	(Zambia) Scott Heygate				7		9
	(Spain) Arnau Lledó	Ret			Ret		0
	(India) Shlok Ghorpade				Ret		0
	(France) Noa Sainct				Ret		0
Pos.	Rider	DAK (Saudi Arabia)	PRT (Portugal)	ARG (Argentina)	MOR (Morocco)	ABU (United Arab Emirates)	Points

=== Senior Trophy championship ===
Pos.	Rider	DAK (Saudi Arabia)	PRT (Portugal)	ARG (Argentina)	MOR (Morocco)	ABU (United Arab Emirates)	Points
1	(Czech Republic) David Pabiška	1	1		2		83
2	(Argentina) Leonardo Cola	2					30
3	(Czech Republic) Roman Krejčí				1		25
4	(Argentina) Puchi Ontiveros			1			25
5	(Lebanon) Rafic Eid	3					24
6	(Italy) Alessandro Rigoni			2	15		21
7	(Italy) Nicola Raspa		2		Ret		20
8	(China) Zhang Min	4					20
9	(Spain) Joan Viñals			6	9		17
10	(China) Zhao Hongyi	5					17
11	(France) Stéphane Brunaud				3		16
12	(Poland) Jacek Bartoszek		3				16
13	(Argentina) Sebastian Urquia			3			16
14	(United States) Nathan Rafferty	6					15
15	(Italy) Cesare Zacchetti	7					14
16	(Poland) Sławomir Sypień				4		13
17	(Peru) Israel Borrell			4			13
18	(Portugal) Nuno Silva	19		5			13
19	(Italy) Domenico Cipollone		4				13
20	(Italy) Mattia Riva	8					12
21	(Czech Republic) Jiří Brož	Ret			5		11
22	(France) Matthieu Jauffraud	9					11
23	(France) Guillaume Martin				6		10
24	(Guatemala) Francisco Arredondo	15			8		10
25	(Finland) Atte Kukkonen				7		9
26	(Republic of Ireland) Gary Ennis			7			9
27	(Spain) Rachid Al-Lal	10					9
28	(Poland) Robert Przybyłowski	11					8
29	(Spain) Ricardo Iglesias				10		6
30	(Switzerland) Dennis Mildenberger	12					6
31	(France) Philippe Dasse				11		5
32	(France) Thierry Bethys	13					5
33	(Italy) Matteo Zoppas				12		4
34	(Morocco) Mohamed Aoulad Ali				13		3
35	(France) Guillaume Jaunin	14					3
36	(France) Patrick Arnoult				14		2
37	(Australia) David Brock	17			Ret		2
38	(Spain) Fernando Domínguez	18					2
39	(Spain) Juan Carlos Torres	16					2
	(India) Jatin Jain	Ret	Ret	Ret	Ret		0
	(Brazil) Luciano Gomes	Ret			Ret		0
	(Uruguay) Fabian von Thüngen			Ret	Ret		0
	(Indonesia) Mufti Muis Karim				Ret		0
	(France) Guillaume Rosier				Ret		0
	(France) Renaud Respaud				Ret		0
	(France) Philippe Peillon				Ret		0
	(United States) Christopher King				Ret		0
	(Finland) Jake Vainio				Ret		0
	(France) Stéphane Joly		Ret				0
	(Poland) Bartłomiej Tabin	Ret					0
	(Spain) Ricardo Lastra	Ret					0
	(South Africa) Ronald Venter	Ret					0
Pos.	Rider	DAK (Saudi Arabia)	PRT (Portugal)	ARG (Argentina)	MOR (Morocco)	ABU (United Arab Emirates)	Points
