= Pürevdorj Mörön =

Mongolian motorcycle racer (born 1998)

Pürevdorj Mörön (Mongolian: Пүрэвдоржийн Мөрөн; born 4 November 1998, Mongolia) is a Mongolian rally raid motorcycle rider.

Mörön won the 2026 World Rally-Raid Championship in the Rally3 category. He is also the first Mongolian to win a motorcycle world title.
