= Lucas Moraes =

Brazilian rally-raid driver

- Nationality: (Brazil) Brazilian
- Born: 12 December 1989 (age 36) São Paulo, Brazil
- Current team: Dacia Sandriders

Lucas Moraes (born 12 December 1989) is a Brazilian off-road racing driver. He is currently driving for Dacia Sandriders in the World Rally-Raid Championship as part of Red Bull's rallying team for rally raid events.

Moraes has achieved multiple accolades throughout his career, including winning the South American Mitsubishi Cup on two occasions, the Brazilian championship three times, as well as finishing third on his Dakar Rally debut in 2023. After culminating a three-year stint at Toyota with a W2RC title in 2025, he moved to Dacia.

== W2RC career ==
In his first attempt at the Dakar Rally in 2023, Moraes drove a Toyota for Overdrive Racing. Partnering experienced co-driver Timo Gottschalk, Moraes became a surprise frontrunner by the end of the first week, sitting third overall after the first six stages. Having run as high as second, Moraes finished the Dakar third overall. Backed by TGR Brazil, Moraes joined Toyota in July 2023, whereafter he finished second to Nasser Al-Attiyah in the Baja Aragón.

Moraes joined Toyota Gazoo Racing ahead of the 2024 season, racing in the World Rally-Raid Championship alongside new co-driver Armand Monleón. He started the year with a strong showing at the Dakar Rally, where Moraes narrowly won stage 3. His chances at an overall podium were dashed on the penultimate day, as a broken damper dropped him and Monleón to ninth. They experienced more troubles in Abu Dhabi, retiring due to a fire at the end of stage three when they had been sitting third overall. Moraes and Monleón scored a podium at the next round in Portugal, beating Carlos Sainz to third place. Despite facing technical troubles on the fourth day of the Desafío Ruta 40, Moraes finished fifth with a stage win to his name. Once again a frontrunner in the final event, the Rallye du Maroc, Moraes won stage 2 in a close fight with Al-Attiyah. Though a broken throttle pedal the following day dropped Moraes down the order, he scored enough points to place third in the W2RC drivers' standings.

For the 2025 W2RC season, Moraes and Monleón returned to TGR. During the 2025 Dakar Rally, Moraes was given a suspended disqualification in stage five when Monleón took a phone handed by "a totally unknown person" — outside assistance is forbidden during the event. However, the subsequent one-hour penalty proved inconsequential as Moraes lost over three hours repairing his car's shock absorbers and suspension in stage six. Nevertheless, he went on to win stage 7 the day after and, having won the final stage as well, finished 15th overall. Moraes started strongly in Abu Dhabi by winning the opening stage. He finished highly in the other stages and ended the event in second overall; this result vaulted him to third in the standings. In South Africa, Moraes climbed up the order with a "clean run" throughout the marathon stage. Despite a navigational error late in stage 4, Moraes and Monleón finished the rally in third place. After taking second in stage 1 of the Portugal rally, Moraes finished fifth in stage 2 in spite of a puncture. Third place on day 3 gave Moraes and Monleón the overall lead — one they would defend against Henk Lategan in the final two days to cling onto victory. Having gone into the Morocco season finale in championship contention, consistency allowed Moraes to place second overall before the final day, with one stage and the shortened Power Selective Section left to go. Moraes and Monleón held firm under pressure to secure second place in the rally, and thanks to a late penalty for Al-Attiyah the duo were crowned champions of the W2RC. Soon after the season finale, Moraes announced that he would join Dacia, partnering Dennis Zenz, from the 2026 W2RC season onwards.

== Rally results ==
=== Dakar Rally results ===
Year	Class	Vehicle	Position	Stages won
2023	Car	(Japan) Toyota GR Hilux Overdrive	3rd	0
2024	Car	(Japan) Toyota GR DKR Hilux EVO T1U	9th	1
2025	Car	(Japan) Toyota GR DKR Hilux EVO T1U	15th	2
2026	Car	(Romania) Dacia Sandrider	7th	0

=== Complete World Rally-Raid Championship results ===
(key)

Year	Team	Car	Class	1	2	3	4	5	Pos.	Points
2024	Toyota Gazoo Racing	Toyota GR DKR Hilux EVO T1U	Ultimate	DAK; 9^{40}	ABU; Ret^{5}	PRT; 3^{31}	DES; 5^{27}	MOR; 14^{14}	3rd	117
2025	Toyota Gazoo Racing	Toyota GR DKR Hilux EVO T1U	Ultimate	DAK; 15^{18}	ABU; 2^{45}	ZAF; 3^{26}	PRT; 1^{41}	MOR; 2^{34}	1st	164
2026	The Dacia Sandriders	Dacia Sandrider	Ultimate	DAK; 7^{24}	PRT; 4^{29}	DES; 31^{4}	MOR; 59^{13}	ABU	7th*	70*

^{*}Season still in progress.
