= Dacia Sandrider =

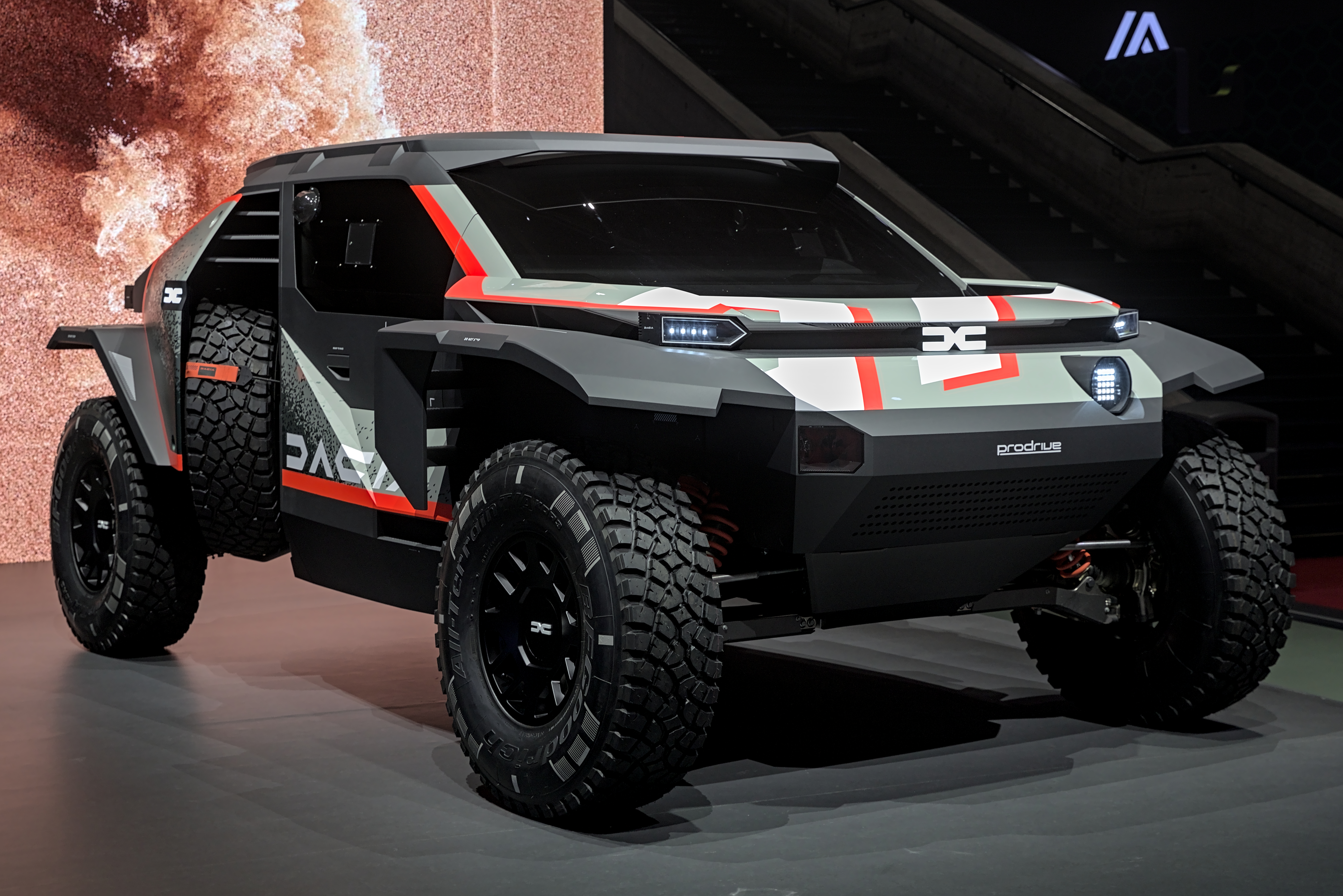
- Dacia Sandrider at the 2024 Geneva International Motor Show
- Category: Rally raid
- Constructor: (Romania) Dacia (Prodrive)
- Designers: David Durand (design director); Philip Dunabin (technical director)

Technical specifications
- Length: 4,140 mm (163.0 in)
- Width: 2,290 mm (90.2 in)
- Height: 1,810 mm (71.3 in)
- Wheelbase: 3,000 mm (118.1 in)
- Engine: Nissan VR30DDTT 3.0 L (183.1 cu in) V6 twin-turbo
- Tyres: BFGoodrich

Competition history
- Notable drivers: (Qatar) Nasser Al-Attiyah (Spain) Cristina Gutiérrez (France) Sébastien Loeb (Brazil) Lucas Moraes
- Debut: 2024 Rallye du Maroc
- First win: 2024 Rallye du Maroc

The Dacia Sandrider is an off-road competition car, built by Dacia together with Prodrive to participate in various competitions in the rally raid. It has been used in the FIA Ultimate T1+ class since the end of 2024 at Rallye du Maroc for the first time.

== Specifications ==
The Sandrider is visually based on the Dacia Manifesto SUV concept car, but was technically developed by Prodrive together with Renault-Alpine and Dacia. Dacia stressed that the Sandrider is not a redesigned Prodrive Hunter. Unlike the Prodrive Hunter, the Sandrider has, among other things, a new engine from the Nissan Z 3.0L V6 twin turbo, a new chassis and suspension and a fully redesigned body. The Sandrider consists of a carbon body on a tubular frame chassis with a reinforced subframe and reinforced shock absorbers and suspension with double wishbones. It has a sequential 6-speed gearbox and permanent four-wheel drive on 37×12.5 R17 BFGoodrich and 350 mm suspension travel.

== Competition history ==
The Dacia Sandrider made its rally raid debut at the Rallye du Maroc 2024. There, Nasser Al-Attiyah won, Sébastien Loeb came in second and Cristina Gutiérrez 82nd.

Dacia competes with three vehicles in the 2025 Dakar Rally and in the entire 2025 World Rally-Raid Championship season. Al-Attiyah, Loeb and Gutiérrez continue as drivers. At the 2025 Dakar Rally, Loeb was forced to retire early on after he flipped his car, causing damage to the roll cage that the organizers deemed structural. Meanwhile, Gutiérrez was also taken out of contention due to a technical defect. Only Al-Attiyah was classified, placing fourth overall after winning the ninth stage. Dacia won its first Dakar Rally in 2026, with Nasser Al-Attiyah coming in 1st place. In the same race, Sébastien Loeb finished in 4th place, Lucas Moraes in 7th and Cristina Gutiérrez took 11th place.

=== Dakar results ===
| Year | Class | Driver | Co-Driver | Result | Stage wins |
|---|---|---|---|---|---|
| 2025 | Cars | (Qatar) Nasser Al-Attiyah | (France) Edouard Boulanger | 4th | 1 |
| 2025 | Cars | (Spain) Cristina Gutiérrez | (Spain) Pablo Moreno | 40th | 0 |
| 2025 | Cars | (France) Sébastien Loeb | (Belgium) Fabian Lurquin | DNF | 0 |
| 2026 | Cars | (Qatar) Nasser Al-Attiyah | (Belgium) Fabian Lurquin | 1st | 2 |
| 2026 | Cars | (Spain) Cristina Gutiérrez | (Spain) Pablo Moreno | 11th | 0 |
| 2026 | Cars | (France) Sébastien Loeb | (France) Edouard Boulanger | 4th | 0 |
| 2026 | Cars | (Brazil) Lucas Moraes | (Germany) Dennis Zenz | 7th | 0 |
