= Manuel Andújar =

Manuel Andújar may refer to:

- Manuel Andújar (writer) (1913–1994) Spanish novelist, playwright and poet
- Manuel Andújar (motorcyclist) (born 1996), Argentine motorcycle racer
