= Rebecca Busi =

Italian rally driver

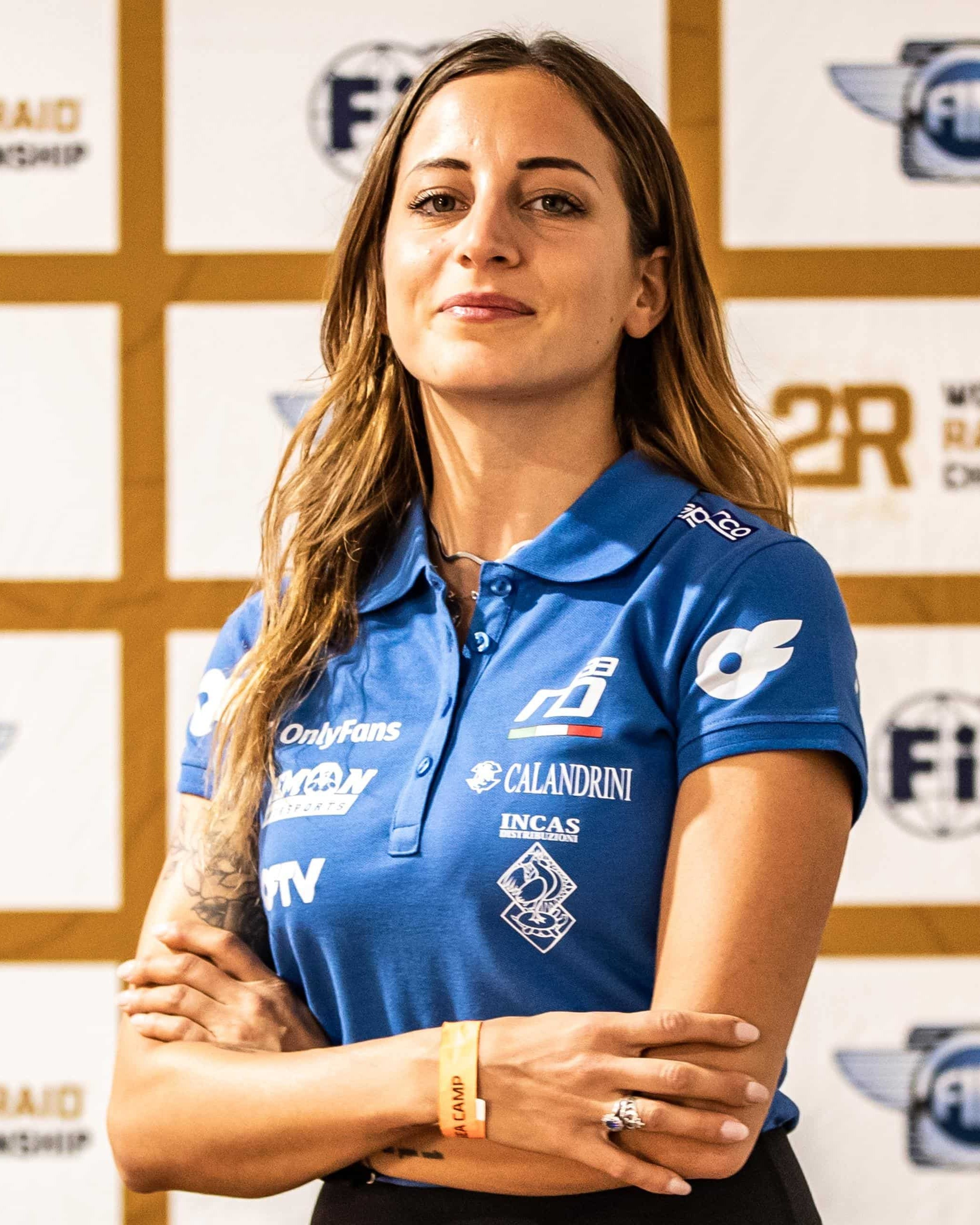
- Busi in 2022

Personal information
- Nationality: (Italy) Italian
- Born: 1996 (age 29–30); Bologna, Italy

World Rally Championship record
- Years active: 2022 in Dakar, 2023 in Dakar, 2024 in Dakar, 2023 and 2024 in W2RC
- Co-driver: Roberto Musi (2022), Giulia Maroni (2023), Sebastien Delauney (2023), Sergio Lafuente (2024-)
- Teams: (Italy) RTeam (2022) (Spain) FN Speed Team (2023) (United Kingdom) OnlyFans Racing Team (2023-2024) (Germany) X-Raid (2026-)
- Rallies: World Rally-Raid Championship
- First rally: 2022 Dakar Rally

Rebecca Busi (born in 1996) is an Italian rally driver. She is the youngest Italian female competitor to finish the 2022 Dakar Rally. She finished her first year of World Rally-Raid Championship in fourth position in the overall T4 classification.

== Early life ==
Rebecca Busi was born in Bologna, Italy, and spent her early years in Camugnano. Her interest in driving began at the age of 14, influenced by her father's love for motorsports.

Rebecca has a degree in Economics and Management. She later went to Barcelona for her master's in International Business at EAE Business School. While studying, she also trained for the Dakar Rally. Every week, she traveled from Barcelona to Italy to train and prepare her team for the competition. Her father, an enduro rider who participated in events like the Pharaon Rally, had to give up his Dakar dreams due to a severe leg injury.

== Rallying career ==
Rebecca's journey in motorsports began when she started working as part of the support crew at events like the Baja Aragón and the Merzouga Rally in Spain. Her transition from crew member to driver took place at the Dakar Rally in Saudi Arabia. In the Classic category, she drove a 1992 Range Rover 3.9, with Roberto Musi as her codriver, after the latter remained without driver shortly before the race. This made her the youngest Italian female driver to participate in the 44th edition of the Dakar. This race spanned two weeks and covered a distance of 8,000 kilometers. During this race, she met Giulia Maroni, who was also participating in the same retro race. Maroni later became her co-driver for the 2023 edition of the Dakar. Together with Giulia and Luciano Carcheri, she formed an all-female crew. In April 2023, Rebecca participated in the Sonora Rally, a significant event in the World Rally Raid Championship held in Mexico. She joined the FN Speed Team and partnered with her new co-driver, Sebastien Delauney from France, in the T4 category.

From Dakar Rally 2024 onwards her codriver became Dakar Legend Sergio Lafuente, from Uruguay. This was the hardest Dakar in which she participated in her young career. She concluded this race in 22nd position in the T4 category. She later raced the remaining events of the W2RC championship, concluding it in third position overall. At the end of this year, her partnership with OnlyFans Racing came to an end. She was unable to participate in the 2025 edition of Dakar, due to some issues with her new sponsor, who disappeared very shortly before the start of the race. She did not participate to the 2025 W2RC Championship, as well.

Rebecca will compete in 2026 edition of Dakar in Challenger category with X-Raid Team, driving a Fenic SxS.

== Films ==
She was selected to portray Fabrizia Pons, the first navigator to win a world rally championship race with an all-female crew alongside Michèle Mouton, in the 2024 movie "Race for Glory: Audi vs. Lancia," directed by Stefano Mordini.
