= Pac-Man (disambiguation) =

Pac-Man is a popular 1980 arcade game by Namco.

Pac-Man or Pacman may also refer to:

== Entertainment ==
- Pac-Man (character), the titular protagonist of the franchise
- Pac-Man (series), a series of video games
- Pac-Man VR, a 1996 first person version of the game
- Pac-Man (Atari 2600), a port of the arcade game for the Atari 2600
- Pac-Man (single), the 1992 EP by Power Pill
- "Pac-Man" (song), 2020 song by Gorillaz
- "Pac-Man", a song by "Weird Al" Yankovic from Squeeze Box: The Complete Works of "Weird Al" Yankovic
- Pac-Man (TV series), a short-lived cartoon series
- Pac-Man and the Ghostly Adventures, an animated television series

== People with the nickname ==
- Manny Pacquiao (born 1978), Filipino boxer and politician
- Adam Jones (American football) (born 1983), American former gridiron player
- Luděk Pachman (1924–2003), Czechoslovak-German chessplayer

== Other uses ==
- Pacman (package manager), the package management system of Arch Linux
- Pac-Man (shogi), a trap opening in shogi
- Pacman Nebula or NCG 281, a region of space
- Pacman (security vulnerability), a flaw in Apple M1 microprocessors

== See also ==
- Da Weasel, including MC PacMan
- Lilac chaser or Pac-Man illusion, an optical phenomenon
- Mr. Pacman, band from Denver, Colorado
- 1-Pacman, a Philippine party-list group
- Pacman conjecture, economic conjecture
- Pac-Man defense, a legal strategy where a smaller company fights off a takeover by purchasing the larger company
- Pacman dysplasia, a lethal autosomal recessive skeletal dysplasia
- Pacman frog or Ceratophrys, a genus of frog
- Pakman
- Team Pacman, a wrestling team
- Paceman (disambiguation)
- Pac-Man 2 (disambiguation)
- Pac-Man Fever (disambiguation)
