= Pacemaker (disambiguation) =

A pacemaker is a medical device that regulates the beating of the heart.

Pacemaker may also refer to:

== Medicine ==
- Biological pacemaker, the use of specialized cells to improve the regulation of the heart
- Brain pacemaker, a device to treat movement disorders, epilepsy, depression, or other conditions
- Diaphragmatic pacemaker, a device used to help patients breathe through pacing of the diaphragm
- Natural pacemaker, cells within the heart that initiate contractions and set the pace of beating

== Other uses ==
- Pacemaker (running), a runner who enters a race to set a fast pace for other competitors
- Pacemaker (film), a 2012 South Korean film
- The Pacemaker, a pocket-sized DJ system
- National Pacemaker Awards, American awards for excellence in student journalism
- Pacemaker (software), a high-availability cluster resource manager
- Pacemaker, a fictional talk-radio program Public Liberty Radio station in the Grand Theft Auto IV game soundtrack

== See also ==
- The Pacemakers (disambiguation)
- Paceman (disambiguation)
