= Norberg (disambiguation) =

Norberg is a town in Sweden

Norberg may also refer to:

== People ==
- Anette Norberg (born 1966), Swedish curler and Olympic gold medalist
- Arthur Norberg (1938–2021), American historian
- Cathrine Lindahl née Norberg (born 1970), Swedish curler and younger sister of above
- Charlotta Norberg (1824–1892), Swedish ballerina
- Dea Norberg (born 1974), Swedish singer
- Frank Norberg (1948–2018), Irish hurler
- Hank Norberg (1920–1974), American football player
- Helena Norberg-Hodge, Swedish environmentalist
- Johan Norberg (born 1973), Swedish historian of ideas
- Jonas Norberg, inventor of The Pacemaker
- Kent Norberg (born 1967), Swedish ice hockey player
- Lennart Norberg (born 1949), Swedish ice hockey player
- Märta Norberg (1922–2020), Swedish cross-country skier
- Mikael Norberg (born 1966), Swedish curler
- Nils Norberg, Swedish heavy metal guitarist
- Richard Norberg, American professor of physics
