= Paceman =

The term Paceman is used in reference to:

- Mini Paceman automobiles
- Practitioners of fast bowling in the game of cricket
  - Bowling machines that fire cricket balls
- The image evaluation process in radiography
- Pace-setters in running

== See also ==
- Pacemaker (disambiguation)
- Pac-Man
- Pac-Man (disambiguation)
