= Mini Countryman =

Compact crossover SUV

MINI Countryman
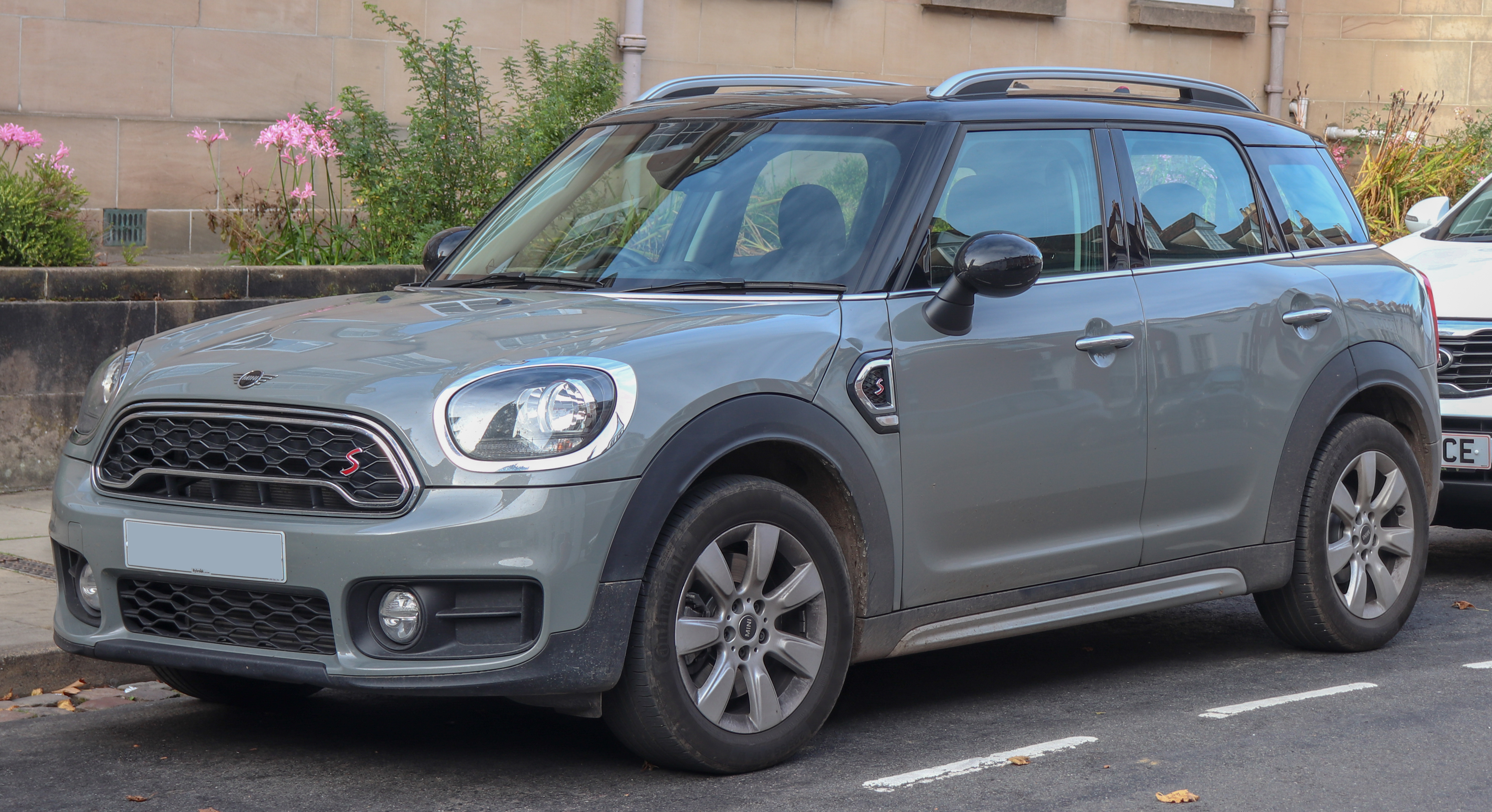
- 2018 Mini Countryman Cooper S (pre-facelift)

Overview
- Manufacturer: BMW (Mini)
- Also called: Mini Crossover (Japan, until 2024)
- Production: 2010–present

Body and chassis
- Class: Compact crossover SUV (C); Compact executive car
- Body style: 5-door SUV
- Layout: Front-engine, front-wheel-drive or all-wheel-drive

The Mini Countryman, also called Mini Crossover in Japan until 2024, is a compact crossover SUV, the first vehicle of this type to be launched by BMW under the Mini marque. It was launched in 2010 and received a facelift in 2014. The second generation vehicle was released in 2017 and received a facelift in 2020. The third generation of the Countryman was released in 2023.

== Pre-production concepts ==
The Mini Crossover Concept previewed the design of the Countryman. It has four doors (2 right swing open, 1 left swing open, 1 left lift/sliding) and four single seats. It was unveiled at the 2008 Paris Motor Show.

The 2010 Mini Beachcomber Concept was based on the Crossover Concept and the Mini Countryman, with no doors and no conventional roof. It included ALL4 all-wheel drive and offroad wheels. It was unveiled at the 2010 North American International Auto Show.

== First generation (R60; 2010) ==
First generation
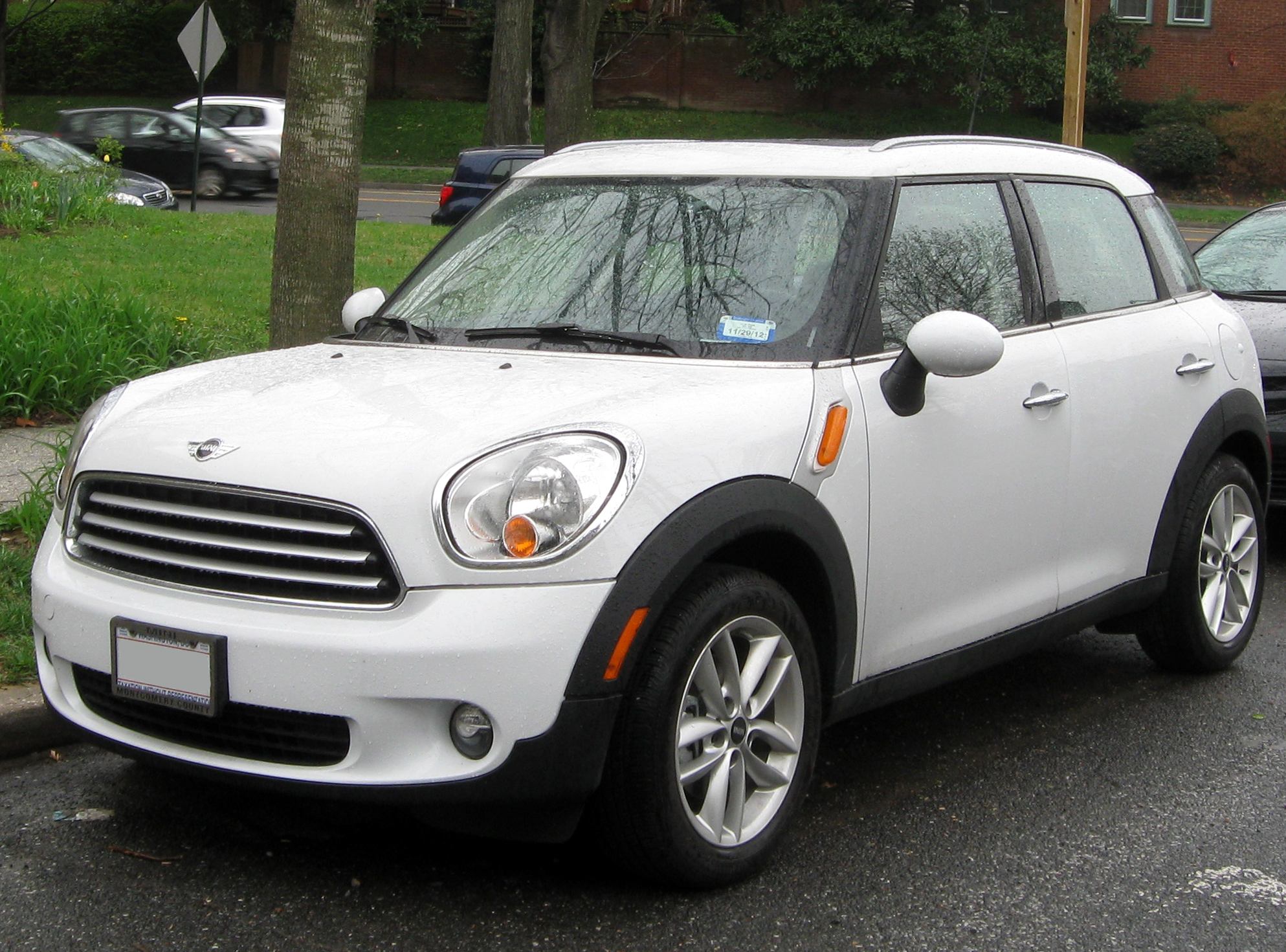

Overview
- Model code: R60
- Production: 2010–2016 (North America)
- Assembly: Austria: Graz (Magna Steyr); India: Chennai (BMW India); Brazil: Araquari (BMW Brasil); Thailand: Rayong (BMW Thailand); Malaysia: Kulim, Kedah (Inokom)
- Designer: Michael Szavits

Body and chassis
- Related: Mini Paceman

Powertrain
- Engine: 1.6 L I4 (One/Cooper); 1.6 L Prince turbocharged I4 (Cooper S); 1.6 L BMW N47 diesel I4 (Cooper D and One D); 2.0 L BMW N47 diesel I4 (Cooper D Automatic and Cooper SD models)
- Transmission: 6-speed manual 6-speed automatic

Dimensions
- Wheelbase: 2,595 mm (102.2 in)
- Length: 4,097 mm (161.3 in); Cooper S: 4,110 mm (161.8 in)
- Width: 1,789 mm (70.4 in) (excluding mirrors)
- Height: 1,561 mm (61.5 in)
- Kerb weight: 1,265 kg (2,789 lb) (DIN); 1,340 kg (2,950 lb) (EU)

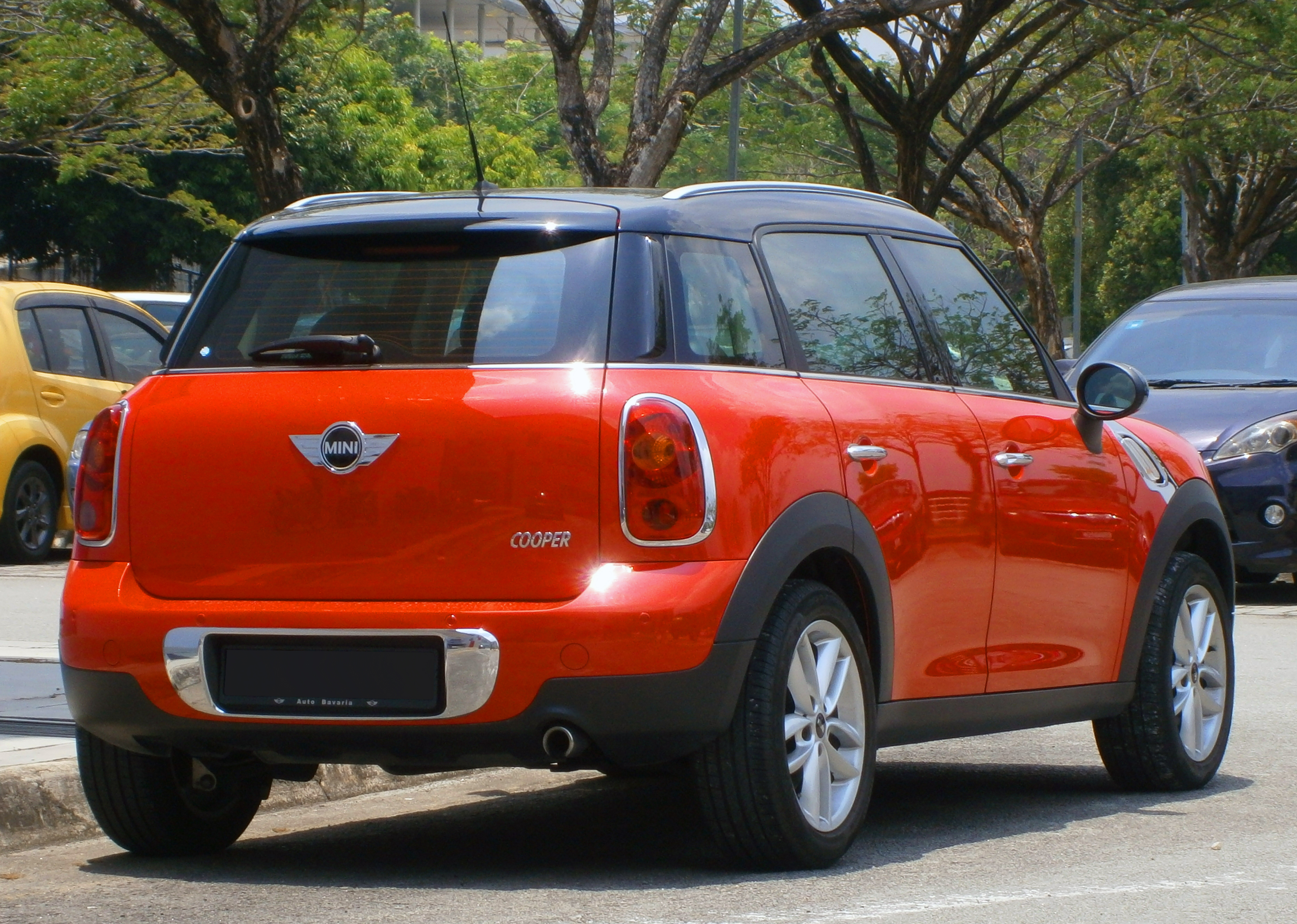
Mini Countryman (Malaysia; pre-facelift)

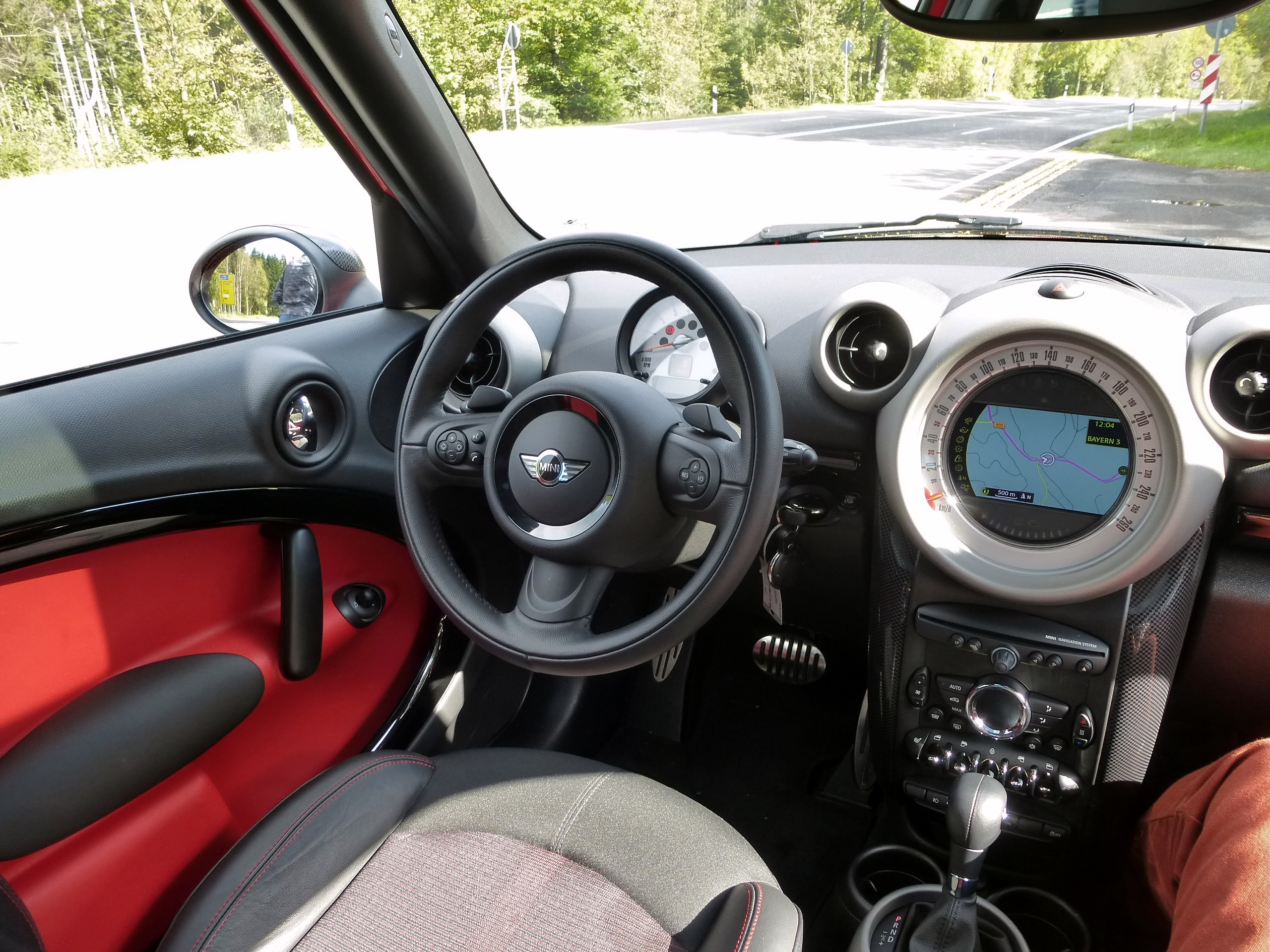
Interior

The design of Mini's first five-door crossover echoed that of the Mini Crossover Concept. The production model was first unveiled at the 2010 Geneva Motor Show. UK models went on sale on 18 September 2010. The availability of models varies between markets, with the United States and Russia not taking the One versions or any diesel-powered models. The All4 all-wheel-drive option is available on variable models, again depending on the country.

The ALL4 all-wheel-drive powertrain includes electro-hydraulic differential, positioned directly on the transmission's final drive, to vary the power distribution from front to rear. Under normal driving conditions, up to 50 percent of the engine's power goes to the rear wheels. Under "extreme" conditions ("extreme" being undefined) up to 100 percent heads to the back wheels.

Early models included Cooper S, Cooper S ALL4, Cooper, One, Cooper D, Cooper D ALL4, and One D. Cooper SD, Cooper SD ALL4, Cooper D Automatic, Cooper D ALL4 Automatic were added from spring 2011. In June 2011, Mini USA collaborated with rock band Kiss to create a quartet of one-off Countryman crossovers themed after the band. The cars were placed on auction on eBay, with proceeds going to UNICEF to help children affected by the Tōhoku earthquake and tsunami. The auction was able to raise US$129,000. Mini USA also sold replica vehicle wraps for Countryman owners through their website and dealerships.

In 2012 the Countryman received some minor amendments, including an EU6 exhaust emissions standard compliance for the One and Cooper models, and using a different clutch material and improved software to reduce stalling problems. They went on sale from November 2012.

A Cooper ALL4 model was added in July 2013.

Changes to US 2014 model year range included the omission of the interior "Centre Rail" feature from the back seats. The rail is still present in the front.

=== Countryman John Cooper Works (2012–2016) ===
The John Cooper Works is a derivative of the Cooper S ALL4 version of the Countryman, with increased engine power to 218 PS (160 kW; 215 hp) and 280 N⋅m (207 lb⋅ft) with over boost: 300 N⋅m (221 lb⋅ft). Steering, suspension, wheels and appearance have also been modified. It was unveiled at the 2012 International Geneva Motor Show, and went on sale in autumn 2012.

US models receive reduced engine power to 211 PS (155 kW; 208 hp) and 260 N⋅m (192 lb⋅ft) (overboost: 280 N⋅m (207 lb⋅ft)), and went on sale in July 2012 as a 2013 model year vehicle.

=== Safety ===
In November 2010, Euro NCAP awarded the Countryman a 5-star crash rating.

Euro NCAP test results* Mini Countryman (2010)
Test	Points	%
Overall:	5 /5 stars	
Adult occupant:	30	84%
Child occupant:	41	83%
Pedestrian:	23	63%
Safety assist:	5	71%

ANCAP test results* Mini Countryman (2011)
Test	Score
Overall	4 /5 stars
Frontal offset	11.89/16
Side impact	16/16
Pole	2/2
Seat belt reminders	2/3
Whiplash protection	Not Assessed
Pedestrian protection	Adequate
Electronic stability control	Standard

=== Reception ===
Pulitzer Prize winning automotive journalist Dan Neil suggested the Countryman had jumped the shark – that is to say the car pushed the Mini ethos beyond relevance, marking the zenith of popularity and the start of decline. Neil suggested that by making a vehicle that is longer, wider and taller, the company had forsaken the inner logic of the brand: excellent handling in a tiny size. In a March 2011 review titled What Part of 'Mini' Did You Not Grasp, BMW? , Neil wrote "with the Countryman, tiny sharks have been jumped." The Countryman became Mini's second most popular model after the iconic Hardtop. The very first year of production it sold almost 50% more units than the Clubman, Convertible, and Coupe added together. Almost 1 out of every 3 vehicles Mini sold in the US in 2011 was a Countryman. This trend continued through 2012 also with almost 1 in 3 Minis sold again being a Countryman - both in the US and globally. By the end of 2013 the Countryman was 31% of total U.S. sales for the Mini brand.

=== 2014 update (R60 LCI) ===
A minor facelift to the Countryman was unveiled at the 2014 New York International Auto Show. Changes include a new structure of the hexagonal radiator grille, underride guard elements for the Cooper S Countryman ALL4 and additional body colour options. It went on sale in July 2014. All variants carried over. US variants include Cooper, Cooper S, Cooper S ALL4, John Cooper Works (with ALL4), with 6-speed manual transmission or optional 6-speed automatic transmission.

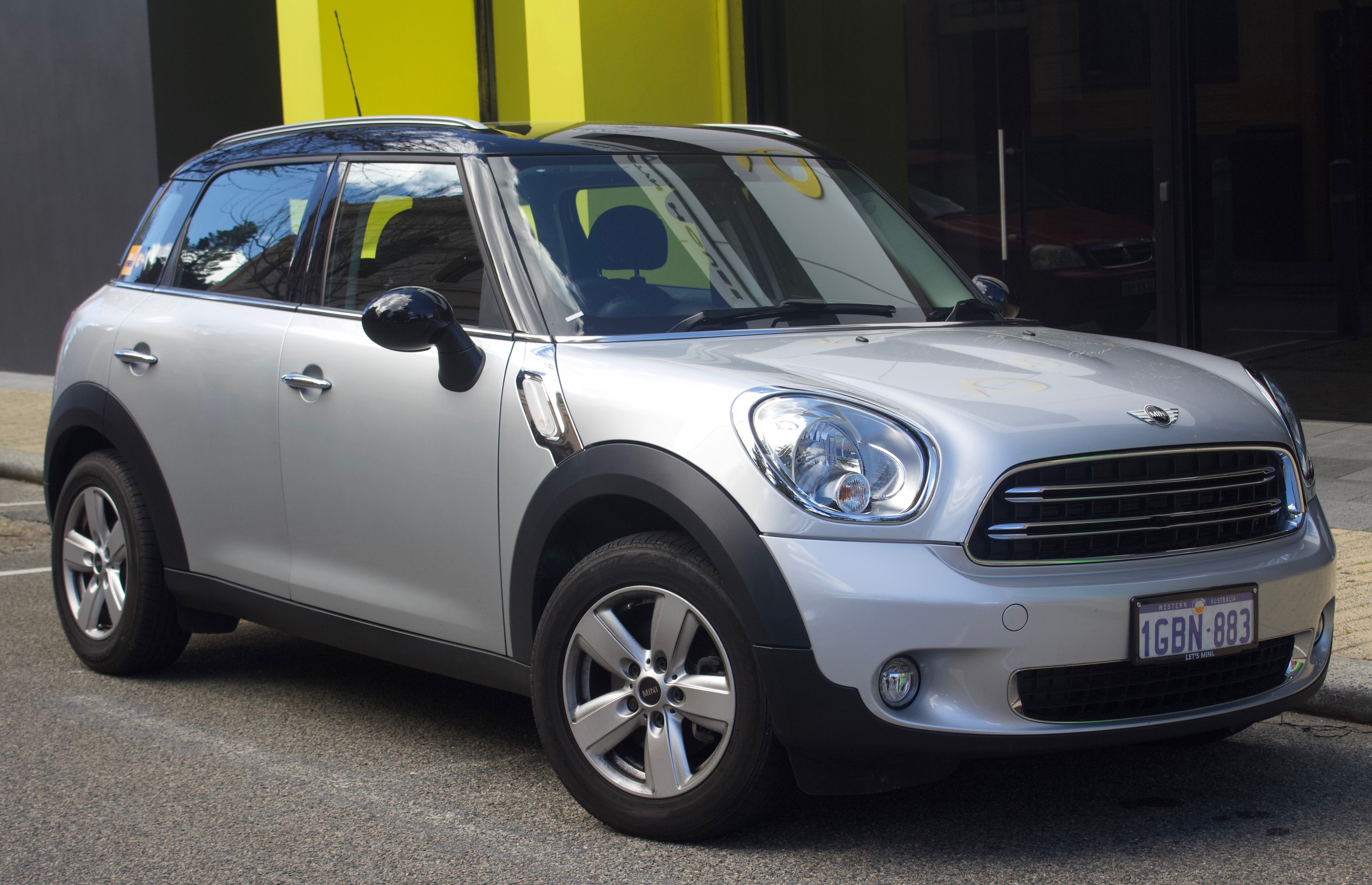
2014 LCI

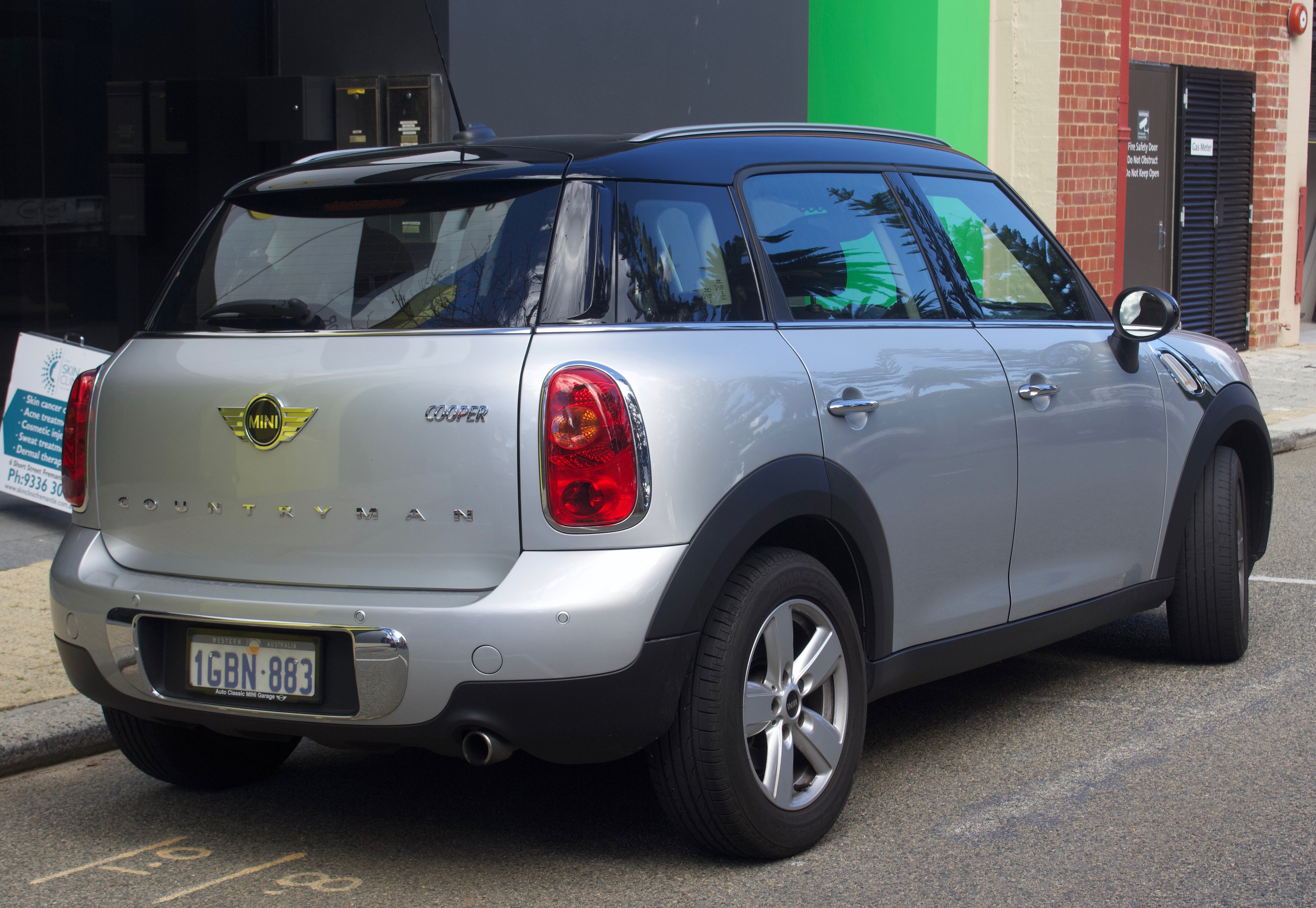
2014 LCI

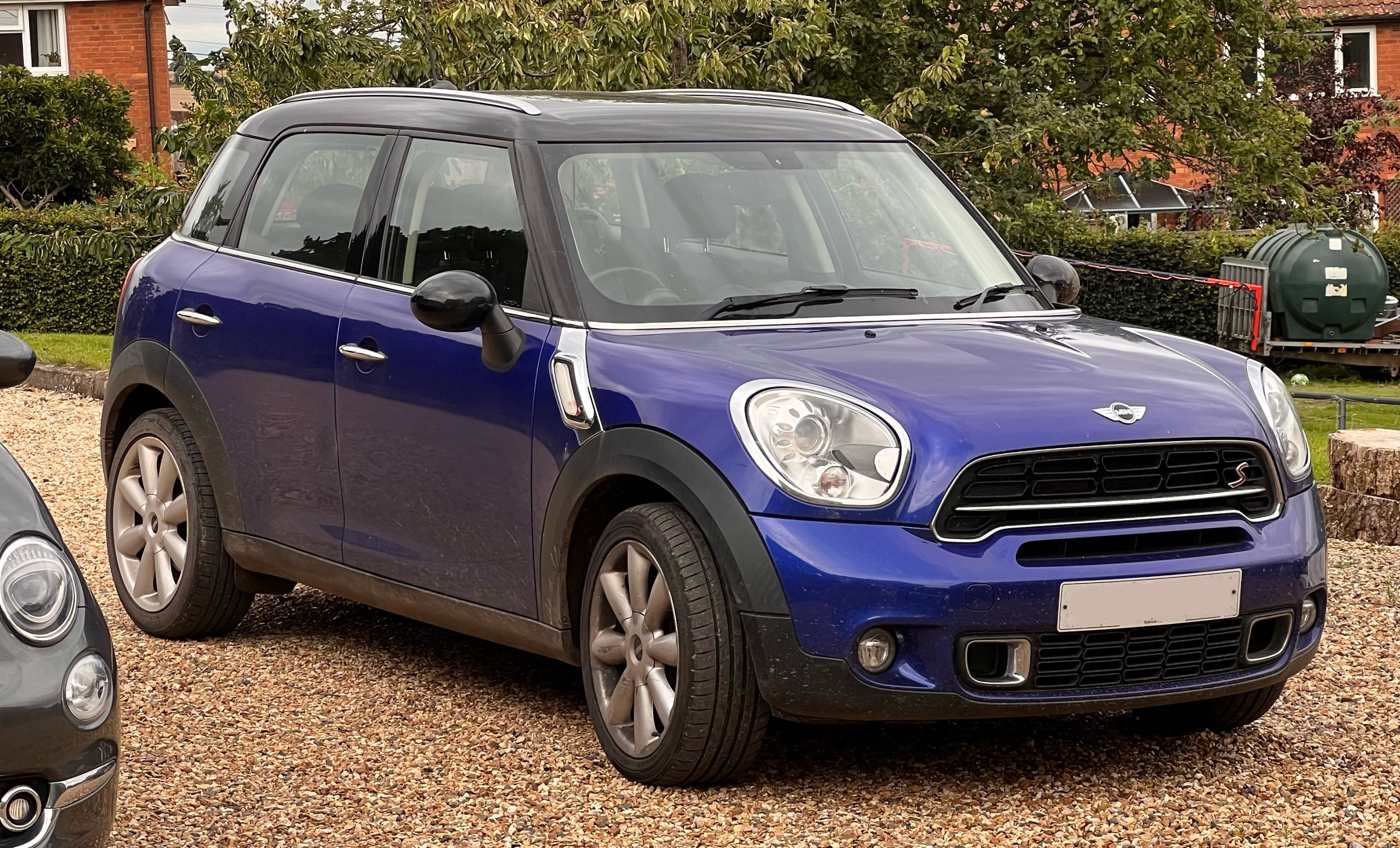
2014 LCI Cooper SD with sport grille and bumper.

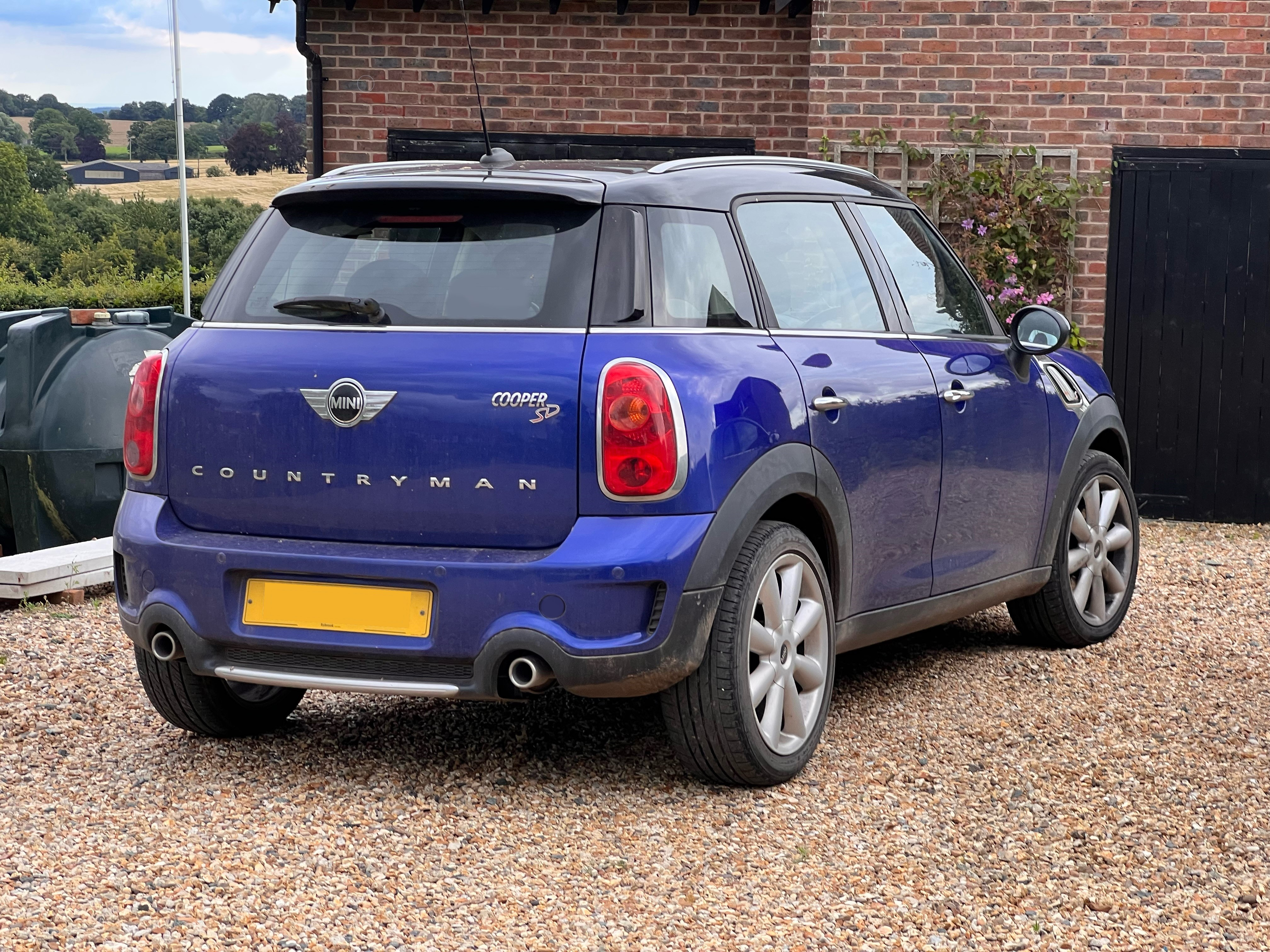
2014 LCI Cooper SD with sport rear bumper and dual exhaust.

=== Powertrain ===
Petrol engines
Model	Years	Type	Power, torque at rpm	Transmission
One	2010–2016	1.6 L (1,598 cc) I4	98 PS (72 kW; 97 hp) at 6,000, 153 N⋅m (113 lb⋅ft) at 3,000	6-speed manual, 6-speed automatic
Cooper	2010–2016	1.6 L (1,598 cc) I4	122 PS (90 kW; 120 hp) at 6,000, 155 N⋅m (114 lb⋅ft) at 4,250	6-speed manual, 6-speed automatic
Cooper ALL4	2010–2016	1.6 L (1,598 cc) I4	122 PS (90 kW; 120 hp) at 6,000, 155 N⋅m (114 lb⋅ft) at 4,250	6-speed manual
Cooper ALL4 Automatic	2010–2016	1.6 L (1,598 cc) I4	122 PS (90 kW; 120 hp) at 6,000, 155 N⋅m (114 lb⋅ft) at 4,250	6-speed automatic
Cooper S	2010–2014	1.6 L (1,598 cc) I4 turbo	184 PS (135 kW; 181 hp) at 5,500, 240 N⋅m (177 lb⋅ft) at 1,600-5,000 overboost:260 N⋅m (192 lb⋅ft) at 1,700-4,500	6-speed manual, 6-speed automatic
Cooper S	2014–2016	1.6 L (1,598 cc) I4 turbo ()	190 PS (140 kW; 187 hp) at 5,500, 240 N⋅m (177 lb⋅ft) at 1,600-5,000 overboost:260 N⋅m (192 lb⋅ft) at 1,700-4,500	6-speed manual, 6-speed automatic
Cooper S ALL4	2010–2014	1.6 L (1,598 cc) I4 turbo	184 PS (135 kW; 181 hp) at 5,500, 240 N⋅m (177 lb⋅ft) at 1,600-5,000 overboost:260 N⋅m (192 lb⋅ft) at 1700–4,500	6-speed manual, 6-speed automatic
Cooper S ALL4	2014–2016	1.6 L (1,598 cc) I4 turbo ()	190 PS (140 kW; 187 hp) at 5,500, 240 N⋅m (177 lb⋅ft) at 1,600-5,000 overboost:260 N⋅m (192 lb⋅ft) at 1,700-4,500	6-speed manual, 6-speed automatic
John Cooper Works (211PS)	2012–2016	1.6 L (1,598 cc) I4 twin-scroll turbo	211 PS (155 kW; 208 hp) at 6,000, 260 N⋅m (192 lb⋅ft) at 1,850(1,900?)-5,600 overboost:280 N⋅m (207 lb⋅ft) at 2,000-5,200	6-speed manual, 6-speed automatic
John Cooper Works (218PS)	2014–2016	1.6 L (1,598 cc) I4 twin-scroll turbo	218 PS (160 kW; 215 hp) at 6,000, 280 N⋅m (207 lb⋅ft) at 1,900-5,000 overboost:300 N⋅m (221 lb⋅ft) at 2,100-4,500	6-speed manual, 6-speed automatic

Diesel engines
Model	Years	Type	Power, torque at rpm	Transmission
One D	2010–2016	1.6 L (1,598 cc) I4 turbo	90 PS (66 kW; 89 hp) at 4,000, 215 N⋅m (159 lb⋅ft) at 1,750-2,500	6-speed manual
Cooper D	2010–2016	1.6 L (1,598 cc) I4 turbo	112 PS (82 kW; 110 hp) at 4,000, 270 N⋅m (199 lb⋅ft) at 1,750-2,250	6-speed manual
Cooper D Auto	2011–2016	1.6 L (1,598 cc) I4 turbo	111 PS (82 kW; 109 hp) at 4,000, 270 N⋅m (199 lb⋅ft) at 1,750-2,250	6-speed auto
Cooper D ALL4	2010–2016	1.6 L (1,598 cc) I4 turbo	112 PS (82 kW; 110 hp) at 4,000, 270 N⋅m (199 lb⋅ft) at 1,750-2,250	6-speed manual
Cooper D ALL4 Auto	2011–2016	2.0 L (1,995 cc) I4 turbo	111 PS (82 kW; 109 hp) at 4,000, 270 N⋅m (199 lb⋅ft) at 1,750-2,250	6-speed auto
Cooper SD	2011–2016	2.0 L (1,995 cc) I4 turbo	143 PS (105 kW; 141 hp) at 4,000, 305 N⋅m (225 lb⋅ft) at 1,750-2,700	6-speed manual, 6-speed automatic
Cooper SD ALL4	2011–2016	2.0 L (1,995 cc) I4 turbo	143 PS (105 kW; 141 hp) at 4,000, 305 N⋅m (225 lb⋅ft) at 1,750-2,700	6-speed manual, 6-speed automatic

== Second generation (F60; 2016) ==
Second generation
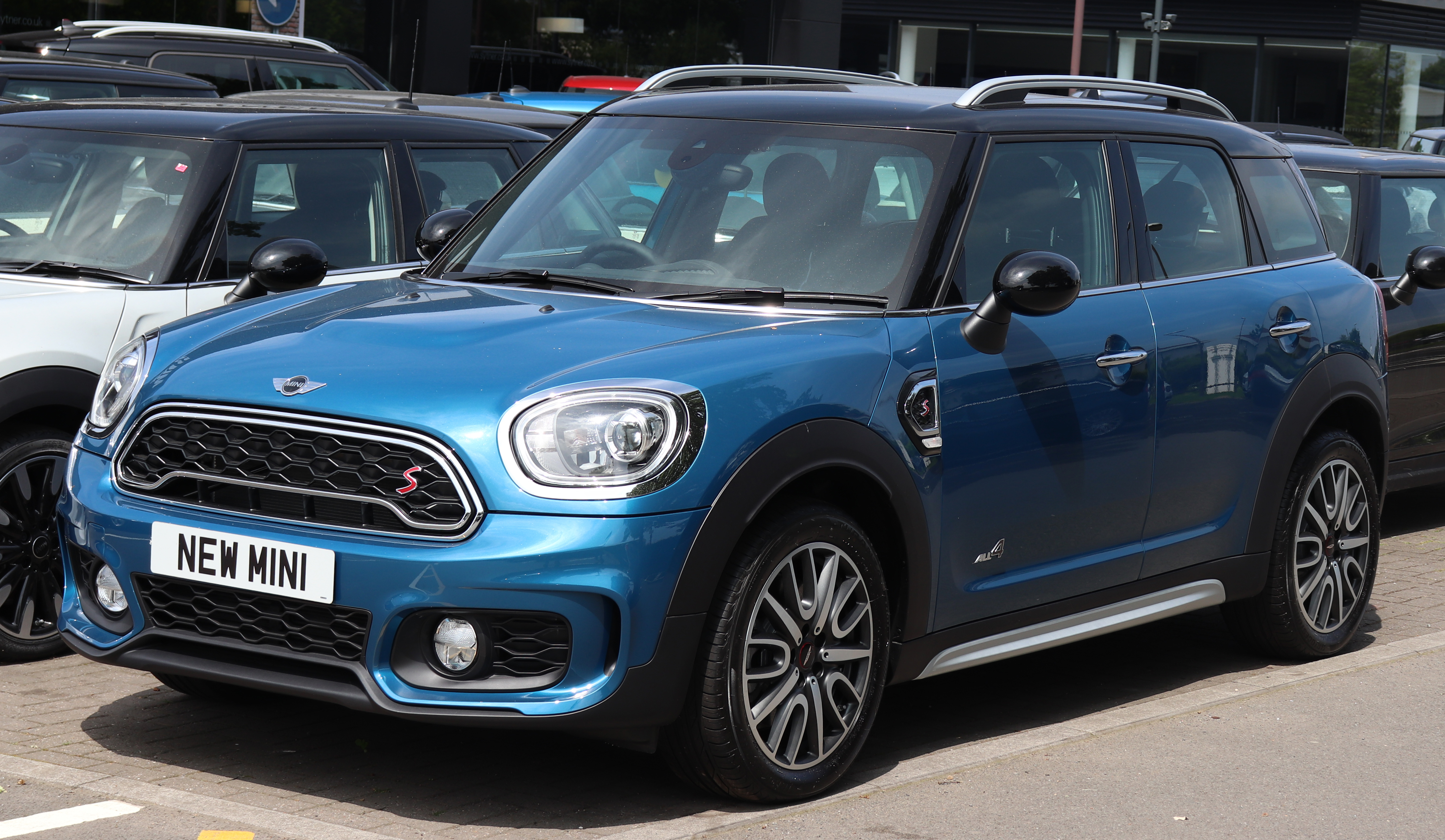
- 2018 Mini Countryman Cooper S (pre-facelift)

Overview
- Model code: F60
- Production: 2016–2023
- Model years: 2017–2023
- Assembly: Netherlands: Born (VDL Nedcar); India: Chennai (BMW India); Indonesia: Jakarta (Gaya Motor); Malaysia: Kulim, Kedah (Inokom)

Body and chassis
- Platform: BMW UKL2 platform
- Related: Mini Clubman (F54); BMW 2 Series Active Tourer (F45); BMW X1 (F48); BMW X2 (F39)

Powertrain
- Engine: Petrol: 1.5 L B38 I3 turbo (Cooper); 2.0 L B48 I4 turbo (Cooper S, JCW Countryman); Petrol plug-in hybrid: 1.5 L B38 I3 turbo with 65 kW electric motor (Cooper S E); Diesel: 1.5 L B37 I3 turbo (One D); 2.0 L B47 I4 turbo (Cooper D, Cooper SD)
- Electric motor: Permanent Magnet Synchronous Reluctance (Cooper S E)
- Transmission: 6-speed manual; 6-speed automatic; 7-speed DCT; 8-speed Aisin AW F8F35 automatic
- Hybrid drivetrain: PHEV (Cooper S E)

Dimensions
- Wheelbase: 2,670 mm (105.1 in)
- Length: 4,313 mm (169.8 in)
- Width: 1,821 mm (71.7 in)
- Height: 1,557 mm (61.3 in)
- Kerb weight: 1,460 kg (3,218 lb) (One); 1,497 kg (3,300 lb) (Cooper); 1,592 kg (3,510 lb) (Cooper ALL4); 1,646 kg (3,629 lb) (Cooper S ALL4)

Chronology
- Predecessor: Mini Paceman (R61)

The second generation Countryman was introduced at the LA Auto Show in November 2016 and went on sale in February 2017 in Europe, and March elsewhere. It was launched with three variants: Cooper (FWD or ALL4), Cooper S (FWD or ALL4), and in June 2017, the new Cooper S E ALL4 plug-in hybrid. The new Countryman is 203 millimetres (8.0 in) longer than the first generation, and 25-millimetre (0.98 in) wider. The Cooper Countryman is powered by a turbocharged 3-cylinder engine, while the Cooper S uses a 2.0-litre turbo I4.

The Cooper S E plug-in hybrid combines a 134 hp (100 kW) 3-cylinder petrol engine and a 65 kW (88 PS; 87 hp) synchronous electric motor, producing a combined system output of 221 hp (165 kW) with system torque of 385 N·m (284 lb-ft). Average fuel consumption on the NEDC test cycle is 112 mpg_{‑US} (2.10 L/100 km; 135 mpg_{‑imp}), with CO_{2} emissions of 49 grams per kilometer. The 7.6 kWh lithium-ion battery is positioned directly in front of the electric motor underneath the rear seat, delivering an all-electric range of up to 40 km (25 mi) and a top speed of 126 km/h (78 mph). Charging at a 240-volt socket takes 3 hours and 15 minutes.

Mini makes the John Cooper Works edition available again in this generation with the tuned version based on the Cooper S. The 2.0-litre four-cylinder petrol engine has been upgraded with a new heat-resistant turbocharger and additional inter-cooler, resulting in 228 bhp (170 kW; 231 PS), 258 lb⋅ft (350 N⋅m) of torque and a 0-62 mph (100 km/h) time of 6.5 seconds. Similar to the Countryman S, JCW Countryman can be mated to either a 6-speed manual or 8-speed automatic transmission (which comes with the option to choose between Normal, Sport, and Eco mode). United States EPA-tested fuel economy for the JCW under manual transmission is 20 mpg_{‑US} (12 L/100 km; 24 mpg_{‑imp}) for city and 29 mpg_{‑US} (8.1 L/100 km; 35 mpg_{‑imp}) for highway which the automatic does slightly better with 22 mpg_{‑US} (11 L/100 km; 26 mpg_{‑imp}) for city and 30 mpg_{‑US} (7.8 L/100 km; 36 mpg_{‑imp}) for highway.

In summer 2019, Mini launched an updated version of the Countryman JCW, unofficially known as Countryman JCW 306. This is thanks to the now increased output of 306 PS (225 kW; 302 hp) which now gives the vehicle a 0-62 mph (100 km/h) time of 5.1 seconds.

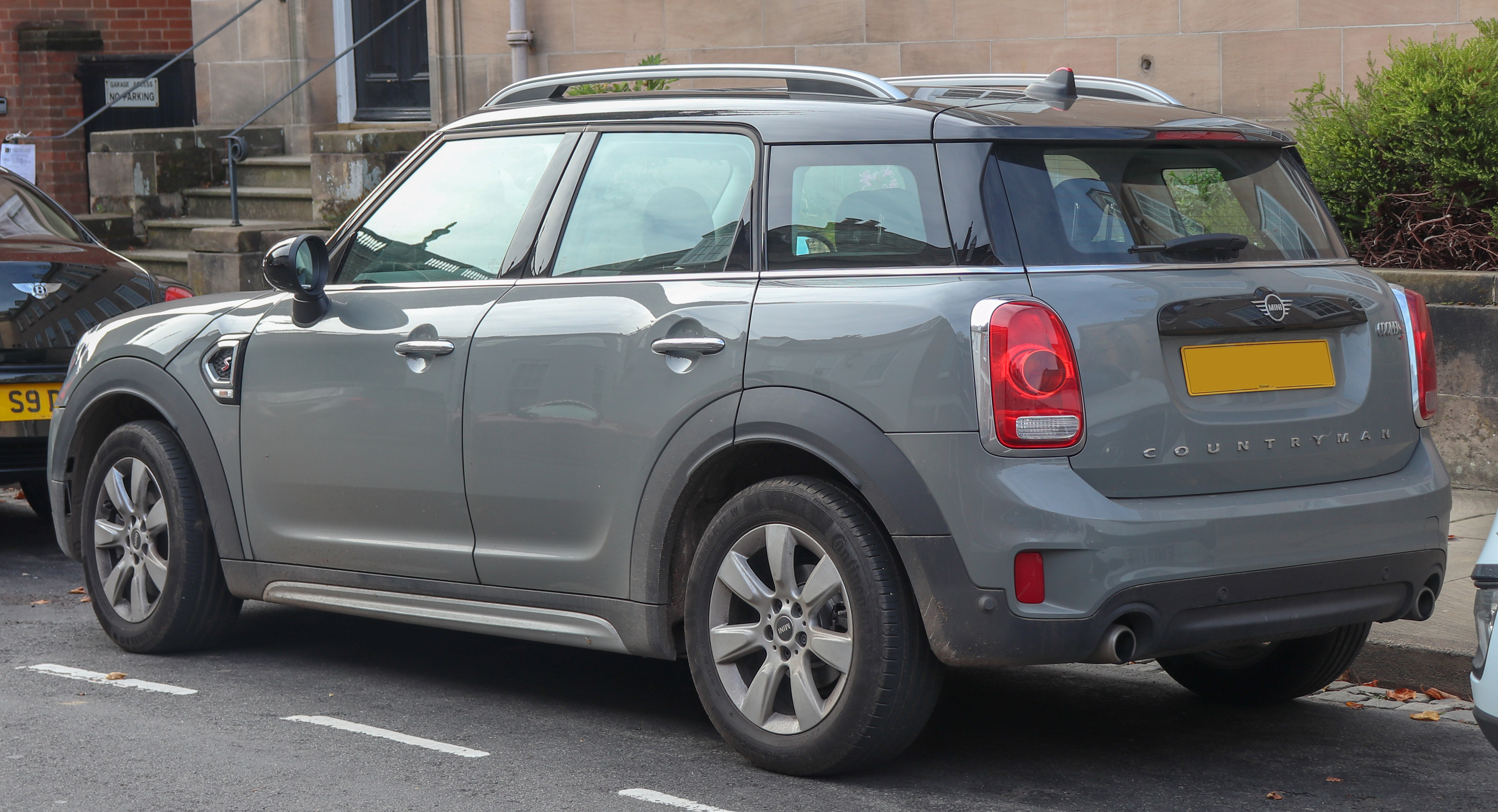
2018 Mini Countryman Cooper S (pre-facelift)

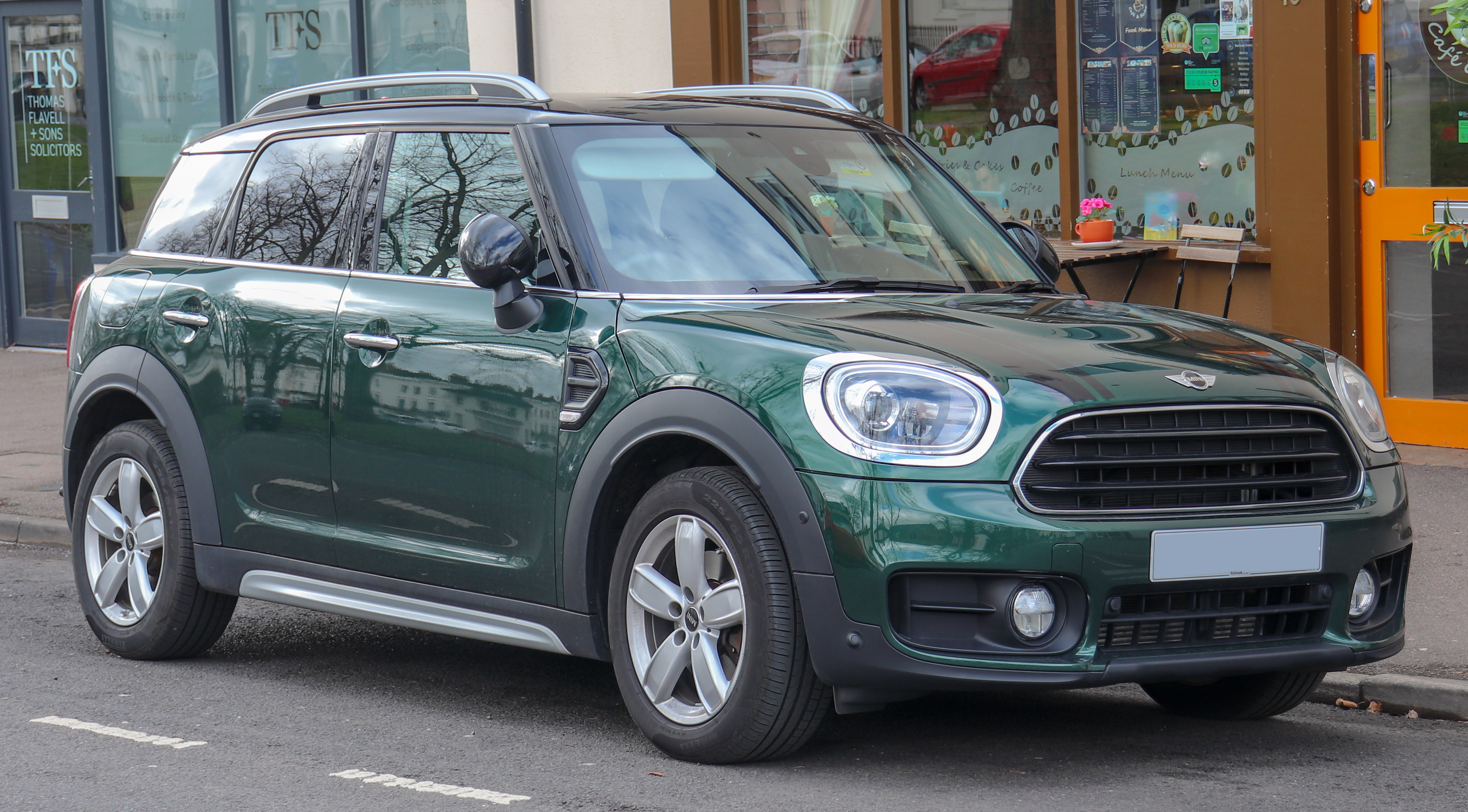
2018 Mini Countryman Cooper (pre-facelift)

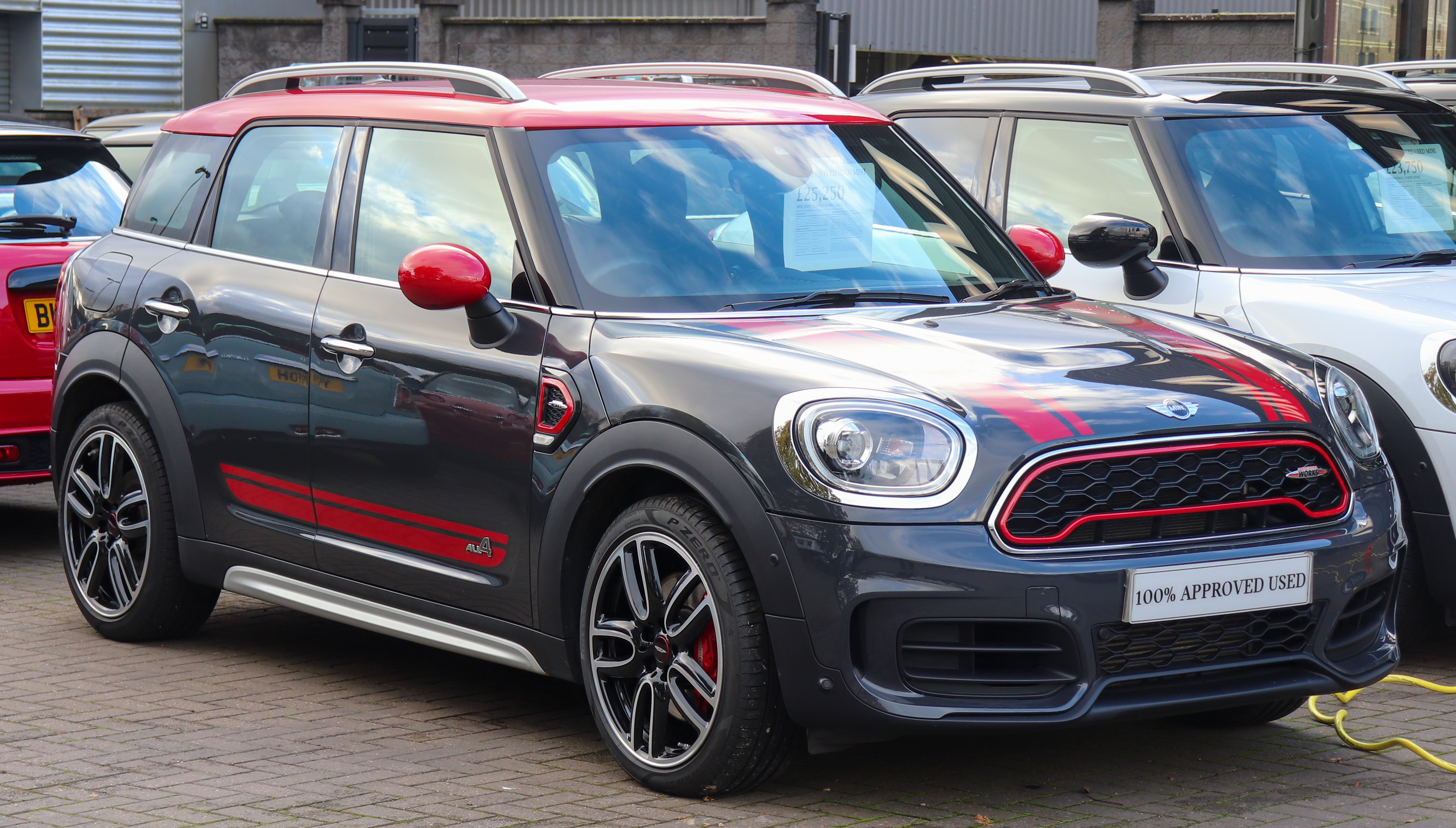
2017 Mini Countryman John Cooper Works (pre-facelift)

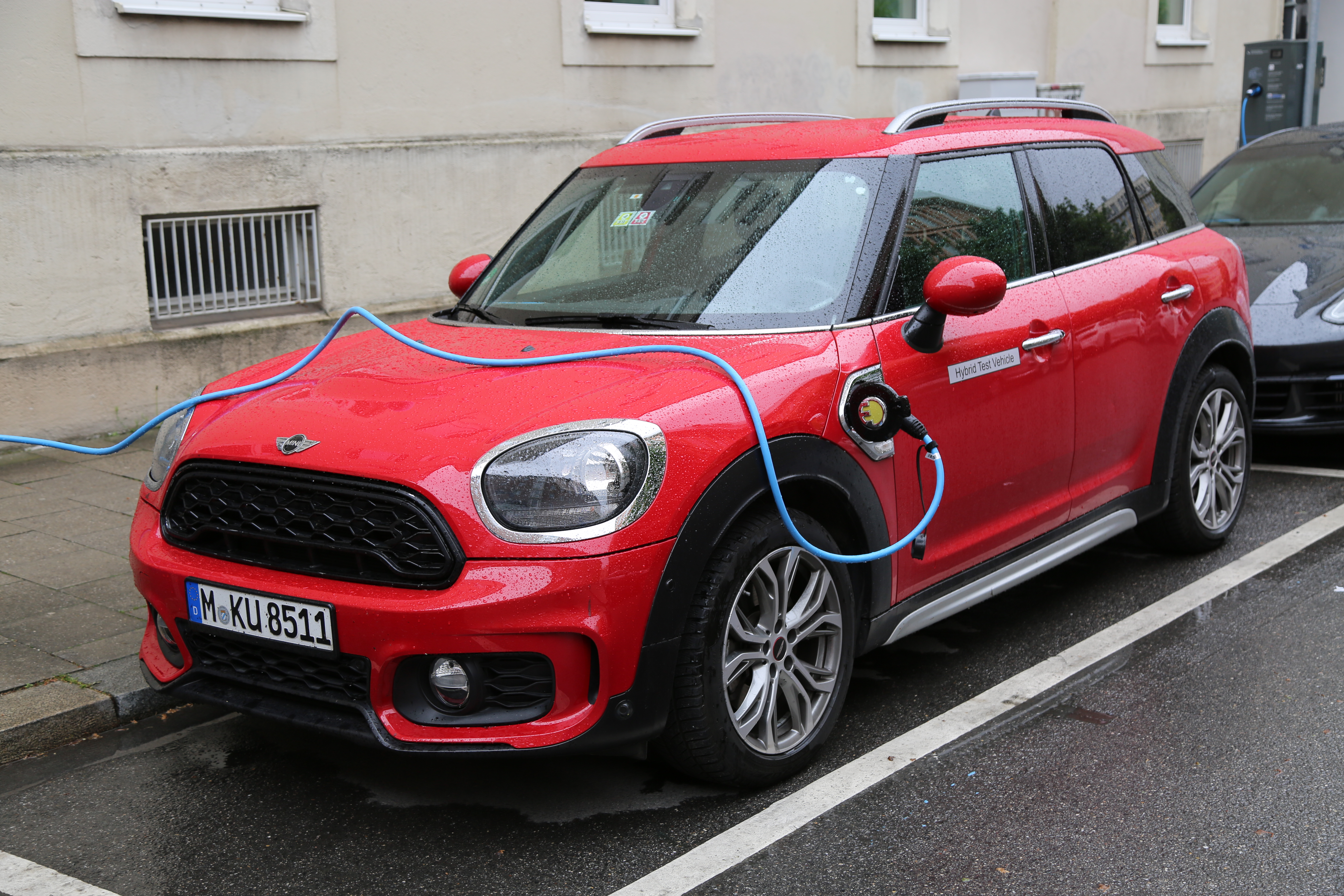
SE Countryman Hybrid (pre-facelift)

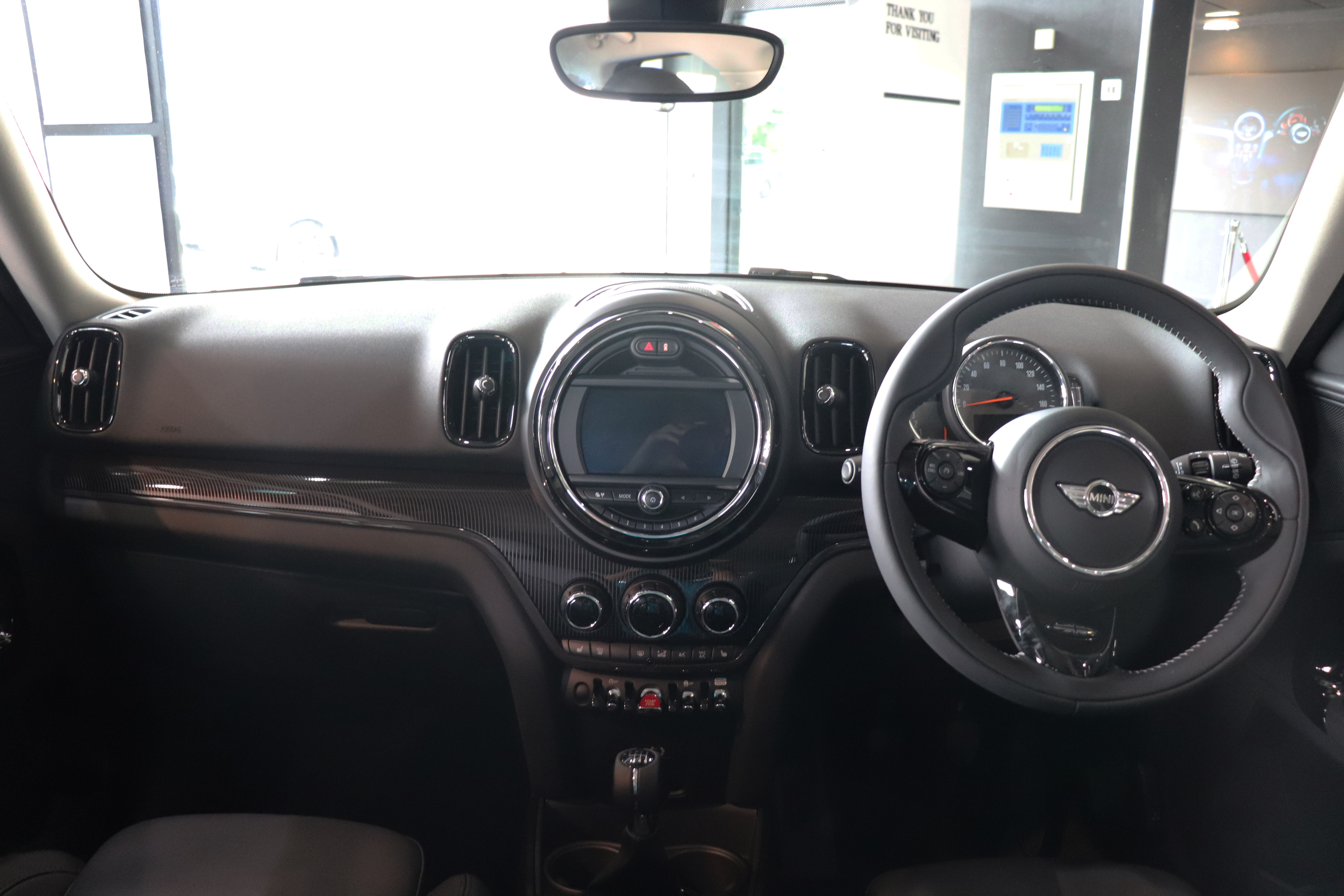
Interior

=== 2020 update (F60 LCI) ===
The Countryman received a facelift in 2020, with a sportier look, adding switchback LED DRLs/blinkers, new taillights to represent the British flag, and a new interior. It receives redone 18-inch alloy wheels, revised grille, and revised front and rear bumpers.

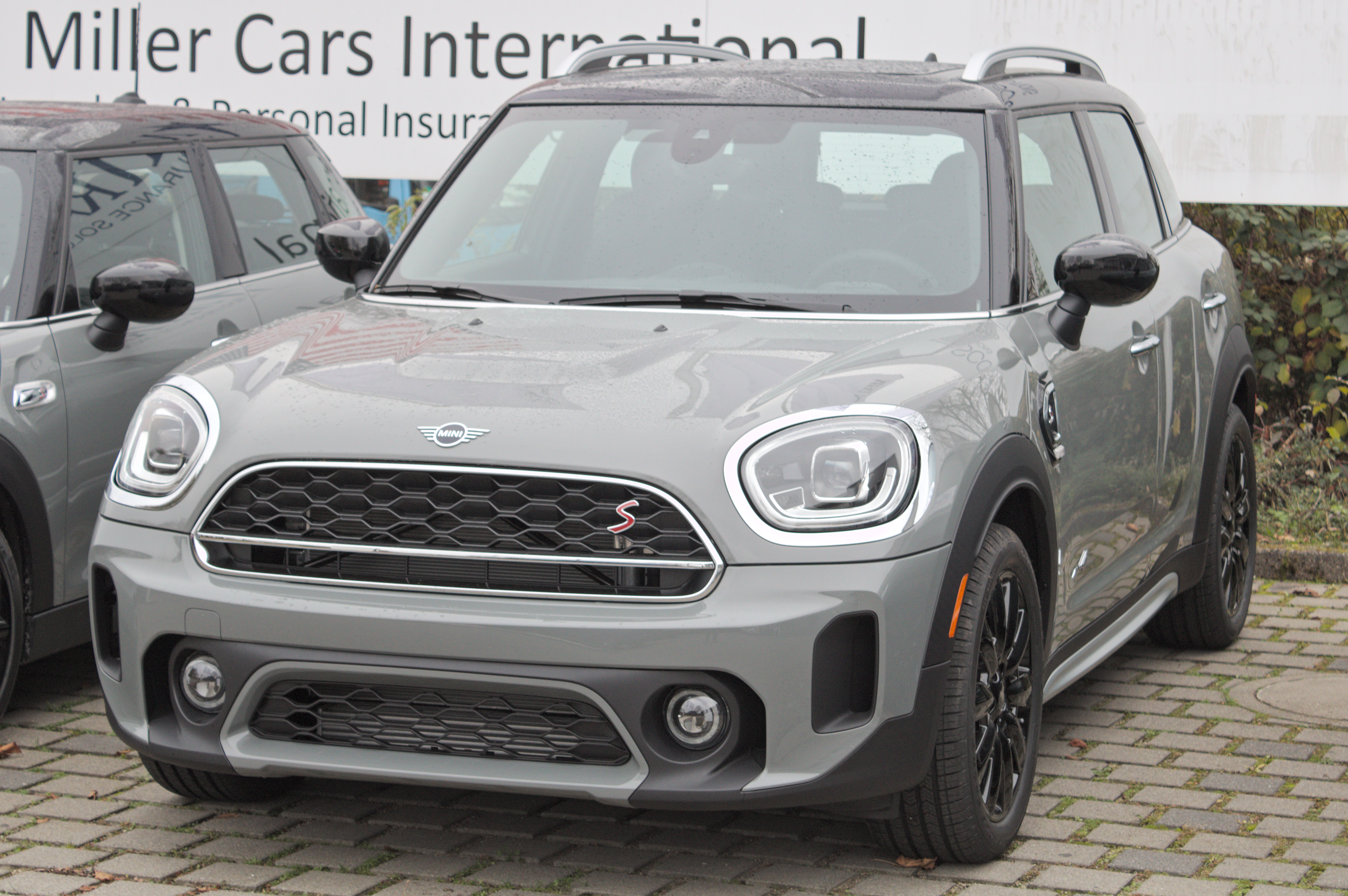
2020 Mini Countryman Cooper S (facelift)

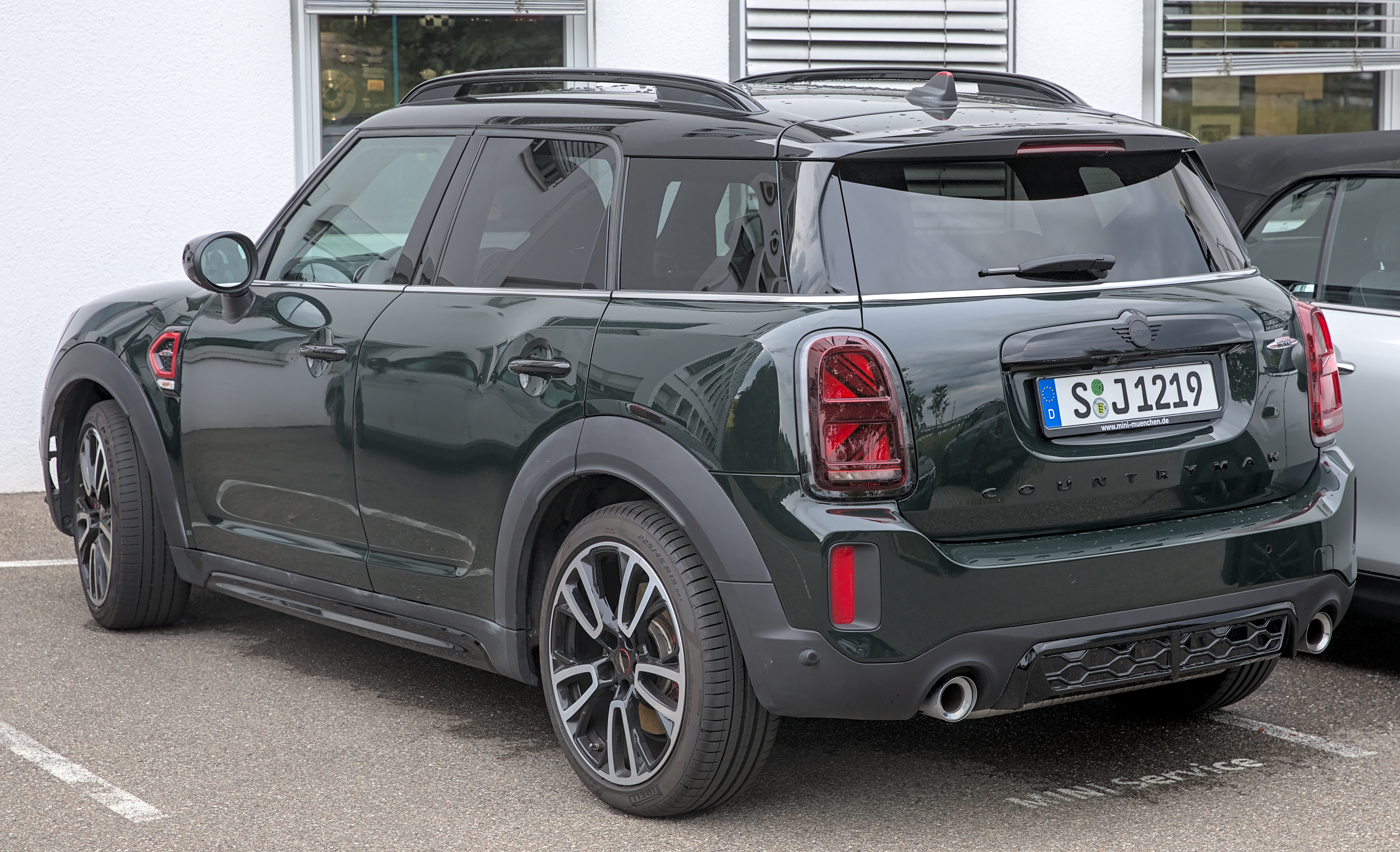
2020 Mini Countryman John Cooper Works (facelift)

=== Powertrain ===
Petrol engines
Model	Years	Type	Power, torque at rpm	Transmission
One	2017-2023	1.5 L (1,499 cc) I3 turbo	101 hp (75 kW; 102 PS) at 4,400, 180 N⋅m (133 lb⋅ft) at 1,250	6-speed manual, 6-speed automatic
Cooper	2017–2023	1.5 L (1,499 cc) I3 turbo	134 hp (100 kW; 136 PS) at 4,400, 220 N⋅m (162 lb⋅ft) at 1,250	6-speed manual, 6-speed automatic (pre-LCI), 7-speed DCT (LCI)
Cooper ALL4	2017–2023	1.5 L (1,499 cc) I3 turbo	134 hp (100 kW; 136 PS) at 4,400, 220 N⋅m (162 lb⋅ft) at 1,250	6-speed manual, 8-speed automatic
Cooper S / Cooper S Hightrim	2017–2023	2.0 L (1,998 cc) I4 turbo	189 hp (141 kW; 192 PS) at 5,000, 281 N⋅m (207 lb⋅ft) at 1,250	6-speed manual, 8-speed automatic, 7-Speed DCT
Cooper S Entry	2019–2023	2.0 L (1,998 cc) I4 turbo	189 hp (141 kW; 192 PS) at 5,000–6000, 281 N⋅m (207 lb⋅ft) at 1,350–4,600	8-speed automatic
Cooper S ALL4	2017–2023	2.0 L (1,998 cc) I4 turbo	189 hp (141 kW; 192 PS) at 5,000, 281 N⋅m (207 lb⋅ft) at 1,250	6-speed manual, 8-speed automatic, 7-speed DCT
JCW Countryman ALL4	2018–2019	2.0 L (1,998 cc) I4 turbo	228 hp (170 kW; 231 PS) at 5,000, 350 N⋅m (258 lb⋅ft) at 1,750–4,500	6-speed manual, 8-speed automatic
JCW Countryman ALL4	2020–2023	2.0 L (1,998 cc) I4 turbo	302 hp (225 kW; 306 PS) at 5,000–6,250, 450 N⋅m (332 lb⋅ft) at 1,750–4,500	8-speed automatic
Cooper S E ALL4	2017–2023	1.5 L (1,499 cc) I3 turbo Electric motor (Total system:)	134 hp (100 kW; 136 PS) at 4,400, 220 N⋅m (162 lb⋅ft) at 1,250; 87 hp (65 kW; 88 PS), 165 N⋅m (122 lb⋅ft); 221 hp (165 kW; 224 PS), 385 N⋅m (284 lb⋅ft)	6-speed automatic

Diesel engines
Model	Years	Type	Power, torque at rpm	Transmission
One D	2017-2023	1.5 L (1,496 cc) I3 turbo	85 kW (114 hp; 116 PS), 270 Nm (199 lb/ft)	6-speed manual, 7-speed DCT
Cooper D	2017–2023	2.0 L (1,995 cc) I4 turbo	110 kW (148 hp; 150 PS), 330 N⋅m (243 lb⋅ft)	6-speed manual, 8-speed automatic
Cooper D ALL4	2017–2023	2.0 L (1,995 cc) I4 turbo	110 kW (148 hp; 150 PS), 330 N⋅m (243 lb⋅ft)	6-speed manual, 8-speed automatic
Cooper SD	2017–2023	2.0 L (1,995 cc) I4 turbo	140 kW (188 hp; 190 PS), 400 N⋅m (295 lb⋅ft)	8-speed automatic
Cooper SD ALL4	2017–2023	2.0 L (1,995 cc) I4 turbo	140 kW (188 hp; 190 PS), 400 N⋅m (295 lb⋅ft)	8-speed automatic

=== Safety ===
In May 2017, Euro NCAP awarded the Countryman a 5-star crash rating.

Euro NCAP test results* Mini Countryman (2017)
Test	Points	%
Overall:	5 /5 stars	
Adult occupant:	34.3	90%
Child occupant:	41	83%
Pedestrian:	23	63%
Safety assist:	6.2	51%

ANCAP test results* Mini Countryman (2017, aligned with Euro NCAP)
Test	Points	%
Overall:	5 /5 stars	
Adult occupant:	34.3	90%
Child occupant:	39.3	80%
Pedestrian:	27.2	64%
Safety assist:	6.1	51%

== Third generation (U25; 2023) ==
Third generation
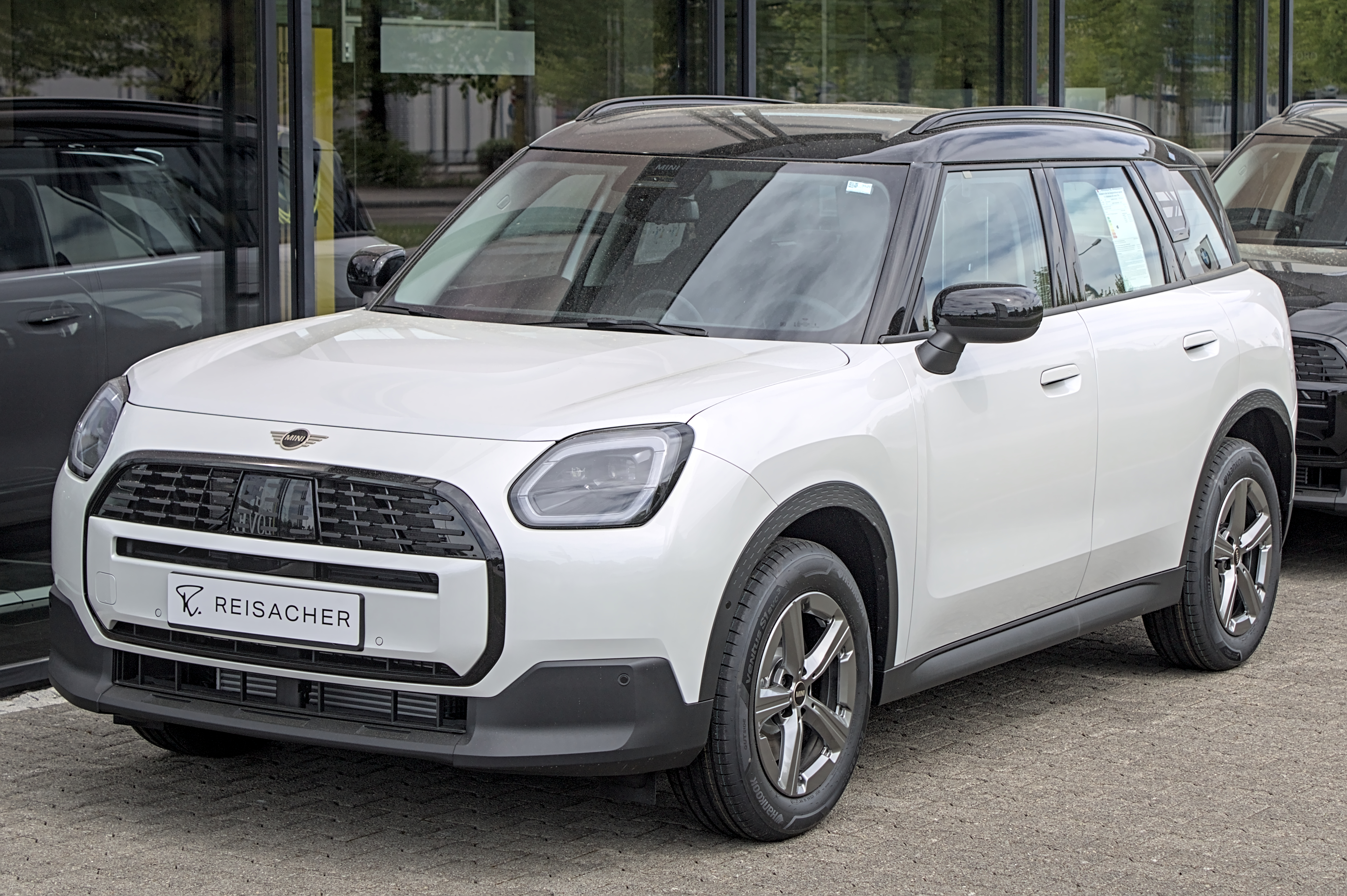
- Mini Countryman C Classic Trim

Overview
- Model code: U25
- Production: November 2023 – present
- Model years: 2024–present
- Assembly: Germany: Leipzig (BMW Leipzig Plant); India: Chennai (BMW India); Thailand: Rayong (BMW Thailand); Indonesia: Jakarta (Gaya Motor); Malaysia: Kulim, Kedah (Inokom)

Body and chassis
- Layout: Front-engine, front-wheel-drive; Front-engine, all-wheel-drive; Front-motor, front-wheel-drive; Dual-motor, all-wheel-drive
- Platform: BMW UKL2
- Related: BMW X1 (U11/12); BMW 2 Series Active Tourer (U06)

Powertrain
- Engine: Petrol: 1.5 L B38 I3 turbo (Cooper C); 2.0 L B48 I4 turbo (Cooper S, JCW Countryman); Diesel: 2.0 L B47 I4 turbo (Cooper D)
- Electric motor: 48V power booster 1 or 2 permanent magnet synchronous motor
- Transmission: 7-speed DCT; 8-speed automatic Single-speed automatic (Cooper E/SE)
- Hybrid drivetrain: power-assist hybrids
- Battery: Lithium-ion battery: 0.9 kWh (MHEV); 66.4 kWh (E/SE)
- Electric range: 432–462 km (268–287 mi)

Dimensions
- Wheelbase: 2,692 mm (106.0 in)
- Length: 4,433 mm (174.5 in)
- Width: 1,843 mm (72.6 in)
- Height: 1,656 mm (65.2 in)
- Kerb weight: 1,545–2,000 kg (3,406–4,409 lb)

The third-generation Countryman was officially unveiled on 1 September 2023, featuring both battery electric and internal combustion powertrains, as well as similar styling cues to the all-electric Cooper, with four trim levels available: Essential, Classic, Favoured and JCW. Production commenced in November 2023 for the ICE-versions, with the electric Countryman following in March 2024.

The John Cooper Works Countryman version comes equipped with a turbocharged 2.0-litre four-cylinder engine and the ALL4 all-wheel drive system.

=== Overview ===
The Countryman is the first car from MINI to adopt their new design language called "Charismatic Simplicity" and the core styling cues of its predecessors have been carried over. There are three individual light modes for the front and rear LED lights, a distinctive C-pillar element varies in shape through trim levels and the signature Union Jack graphics for the rear lights. Designers decided to omit using chrome decorative elements for environmental reasons. The Countryman uses the UKL2 platform, the same as the BMW X1.

The interior has a simplified layout with fewer buttons, the only interior screen is a centrally mounted 9.4 inches (24 cm) OLED touchscreen (operated by MINI OS 9) which can also be operated by MINI Intelligent Personal Assistant and has eight configurable Experience Modes. For the first time, the interior is made with textile surfaces of a dual-tone design.

The Countryman is the first vehicle with Level 2 advanced driver-assistance systems which can enable semi-automated driving at speeds of up to 60 kilometres per hour (37 mph).

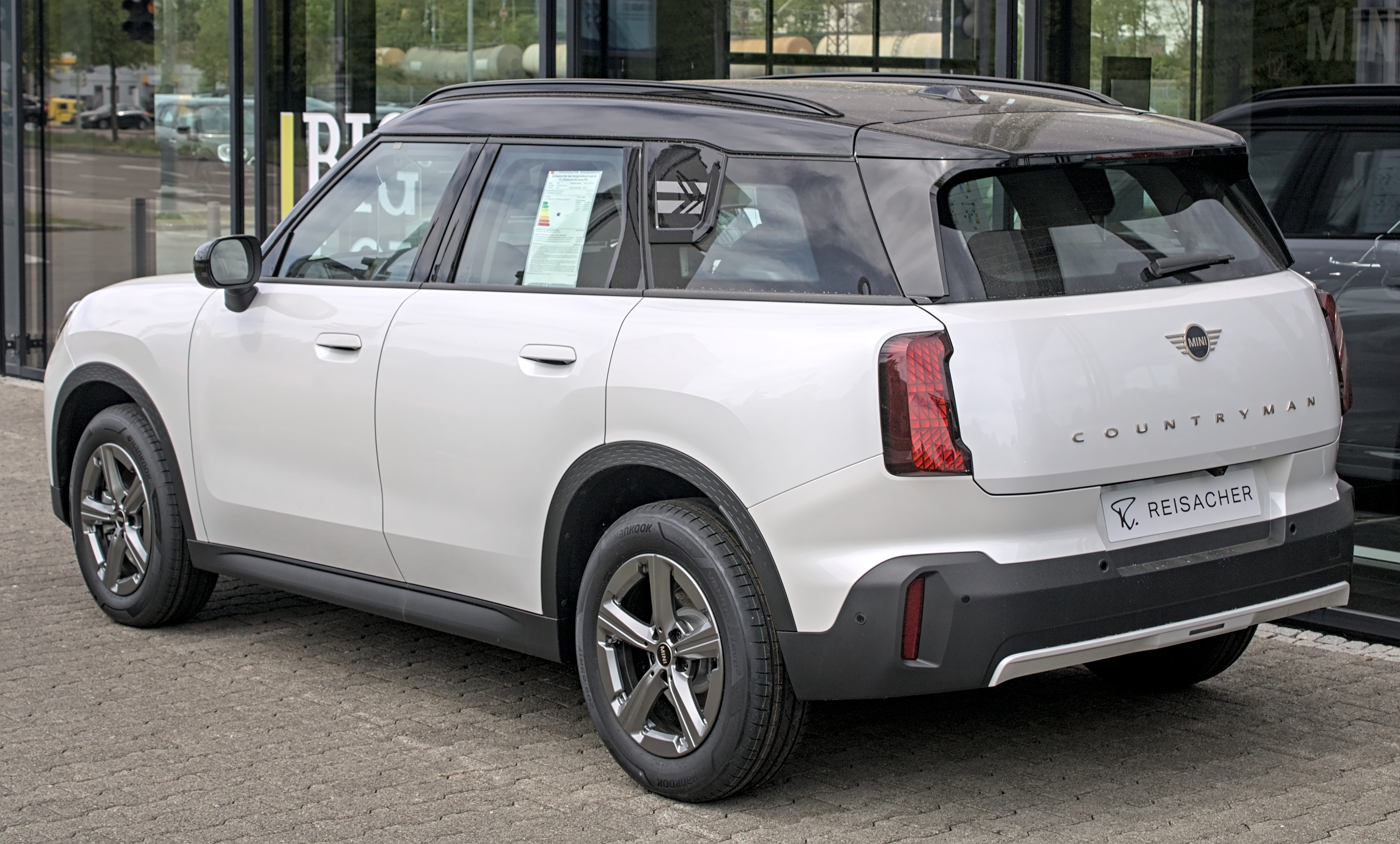
Rear view

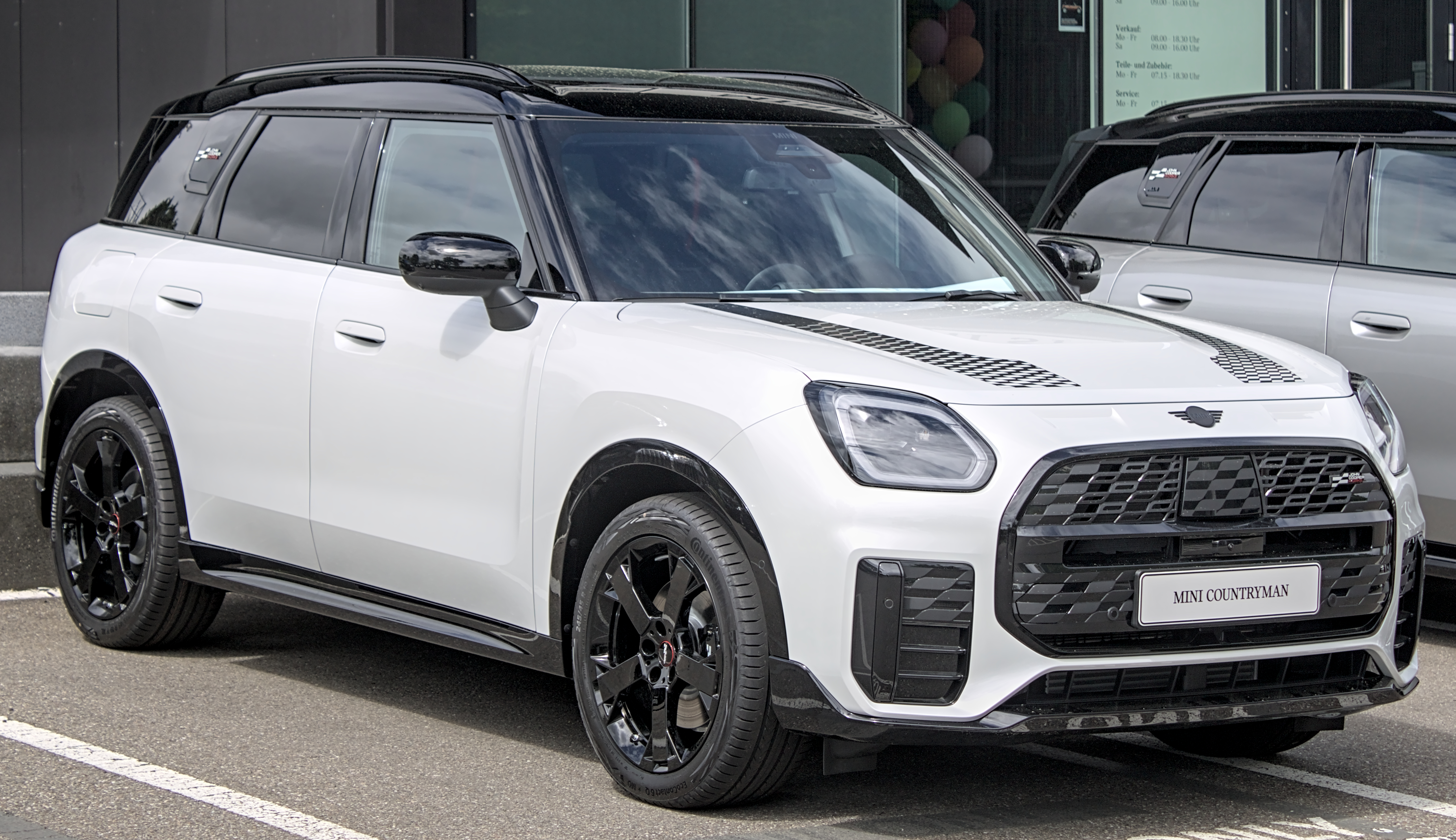
Mini Countryman JCW-Style

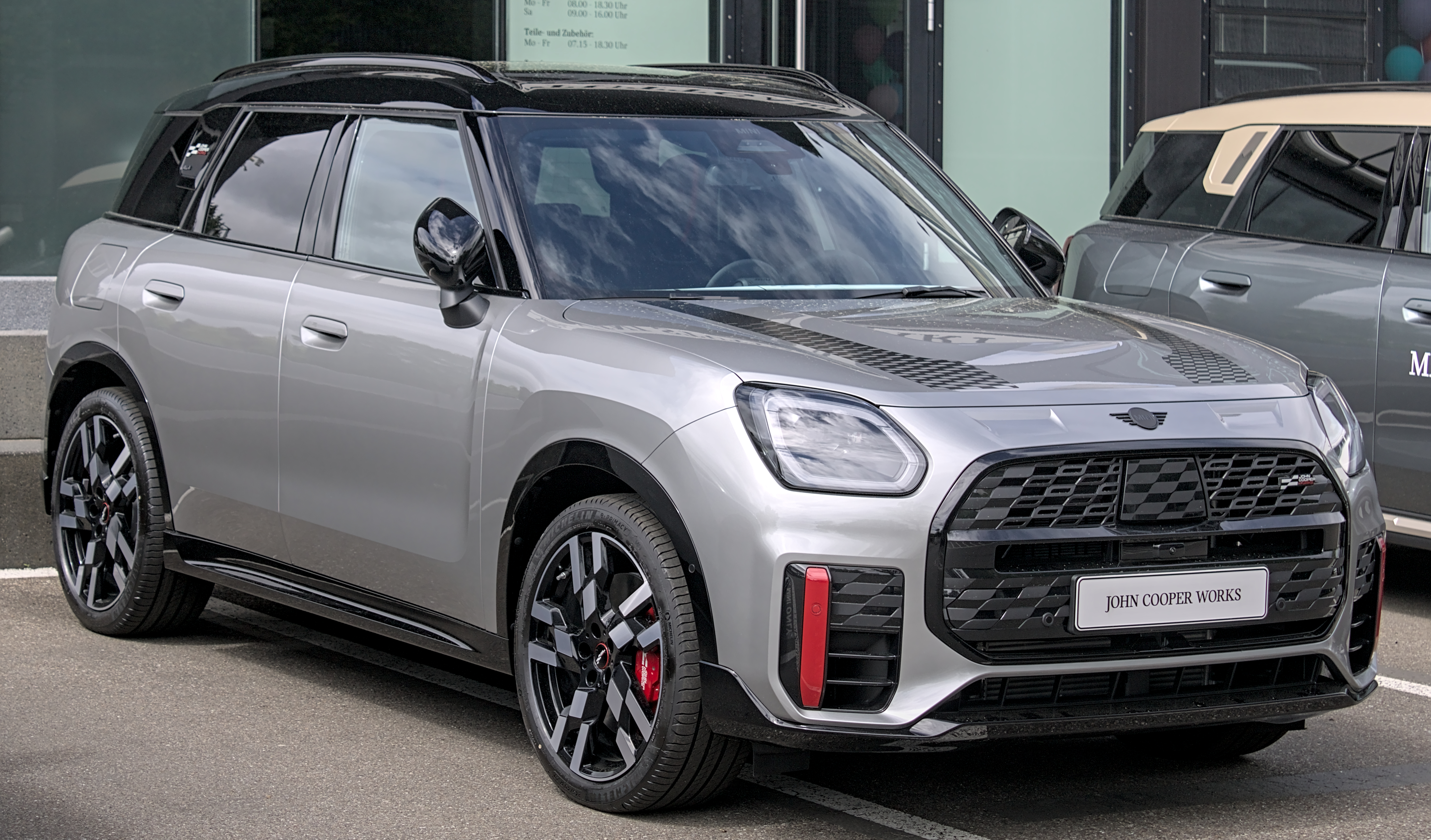
Mini JCW Countryman

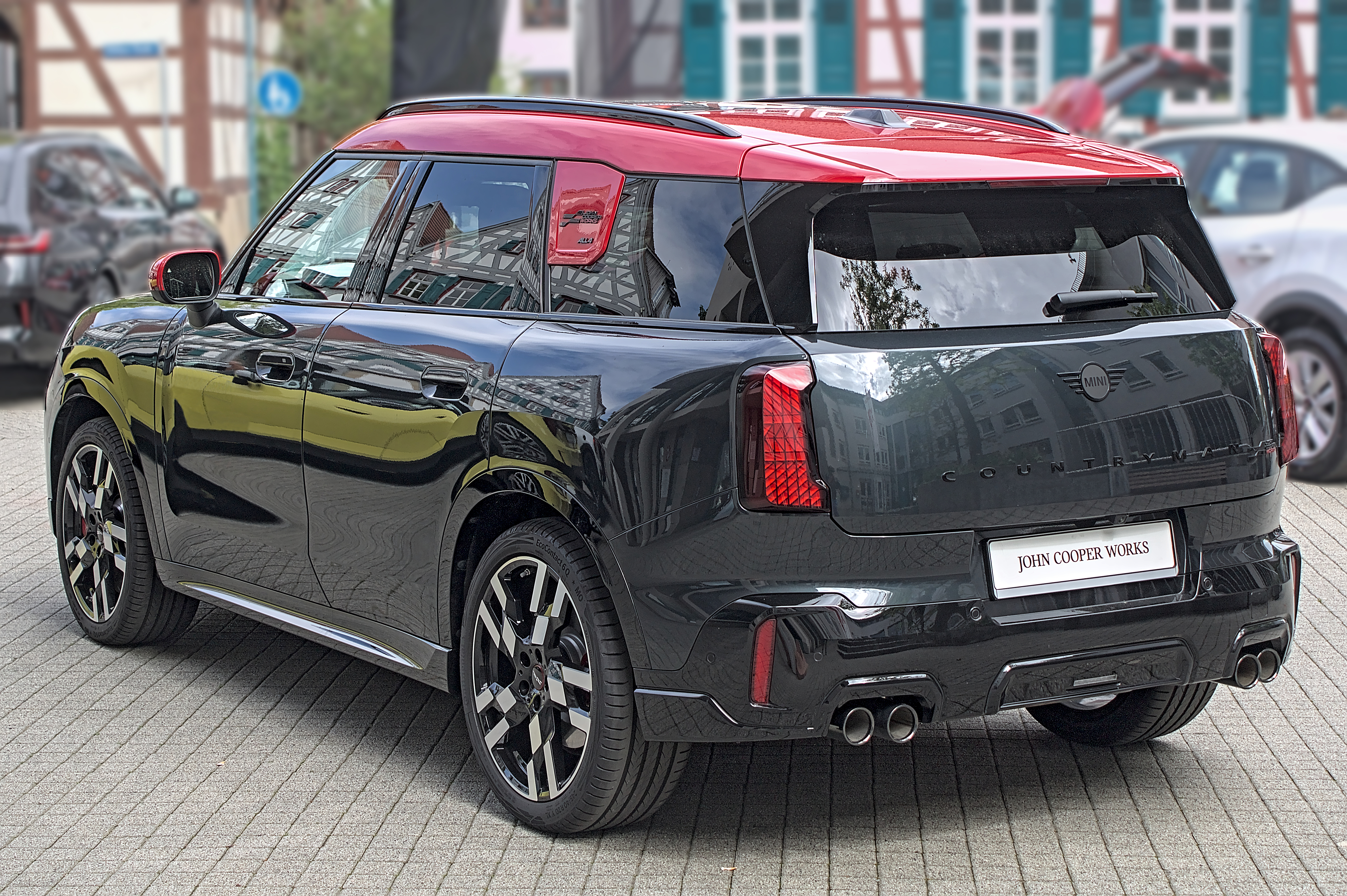
Mini JCW Countryman (rear view)

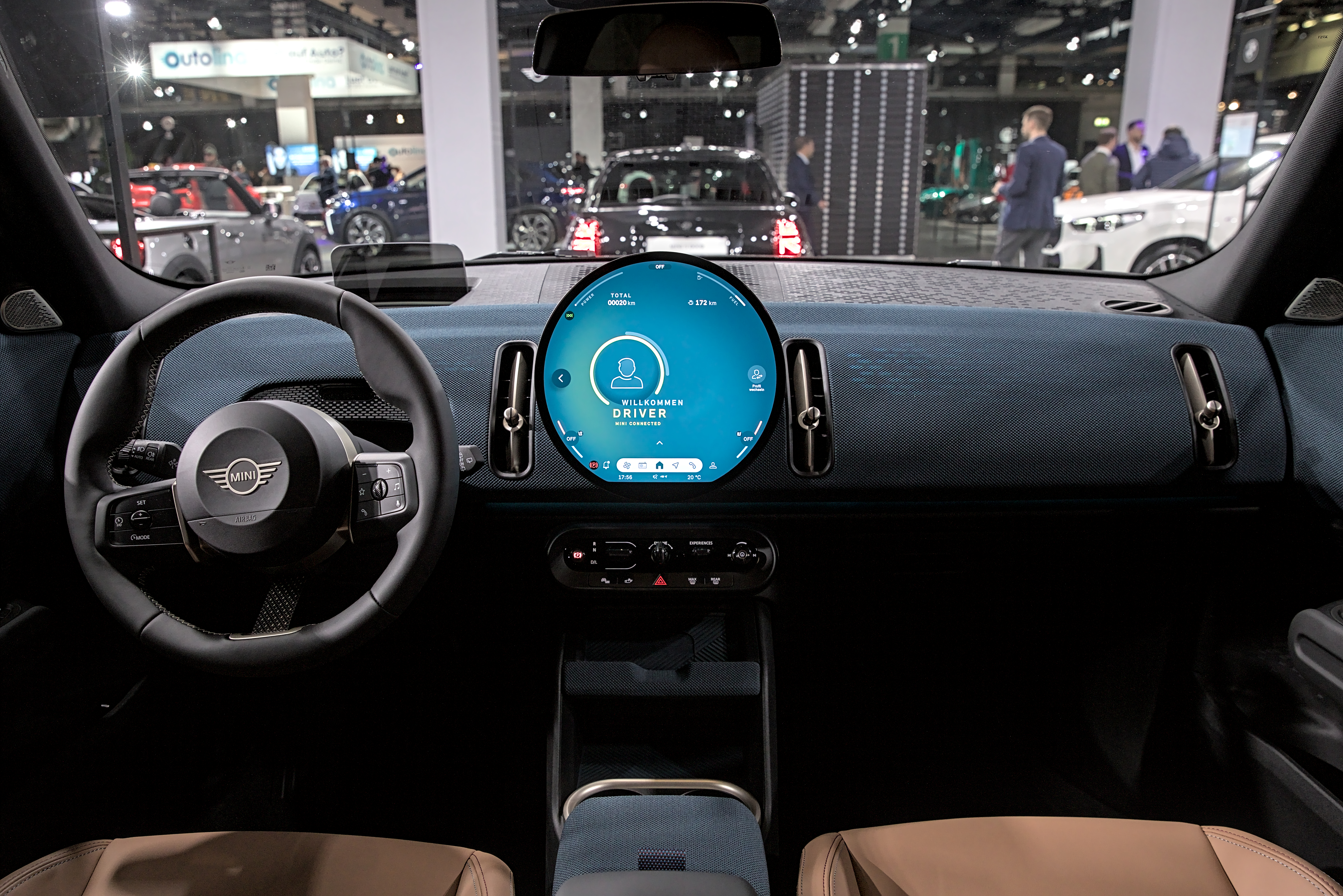
Interior Favored Trim

=== Powertrain ===
Model	Fuel type	Engine code	Displacement	Power	Torque	Transmission	Electric motor	Battery	Top Speed	Acceleration 0–100km/h (0–62mph)	Layout
Cooper C	Petrol mild hybrid	B38A15P	1.5 L (1,499 cc) I3 turbo	125 kW (170 PS; 168 hp)	280 N⋅m (207 lb⋅ft)	8-speed automatic/7-speed DCT	48 V power booster	0.9 kWh Lithium-ion	212 km/h (132 mph)	8.3 s	FWD
Cooper S (EU)	Petrol mild hybrid	B48A20P	2.0 L (1,998 cc) I4 turbo	160 kW (218 PS; 215 hp)	360 N⋅m (266 lb⋅ft)	7-speed DCT	48 V power booster	0.9 kWh Lithium-ion	228 km/h (142 mph)	7.1 s	AWD
Cooper S (USA)	Petrol mild hybrid	B48A20P	2.0 L (1,998 cc) I4 turbo	177 kW (241 PS; 237 hp)	400 N⋅m (295 lb⋅ft)	7-speed DCT	48 V power booster	0.9 kWh Lithium-ion	241 km/h (150 mph)	6.2 s	AWD
Cooper JCW (EU)	Petrol mild hybrid	B48A20H	2.0 L (1,998 cc) I4 turbo	221 kW (300 PS; 296 hp)	400 N⋅m (295 lb⋅ft)	7-speed DCT	48 V power booster	0.9 kWh Lithium-ion	250 km/h (155 mph)	5.4 s	AWD
Cooper JCW (USA)	Petrol mild hybrid	B48A20H	2.0 L (1,998 cc) I4 turbo	229 kW (311 PS; 307 hp)	400 N⋅m (295 lb⋅ft)	7-speed DCT	48 V power booster	0.9 kWh Lithium-ion	250 km/h (155 mph)	5.4 s	AWD
Cooper D	Diesel	B47C20B	2.0 L (1,995 cc) I4 turbo	120 kW (163 PS; 161 hp)	400 N⋅m (295 lb⋅ft)	7-speed DCT	48 V power booster	0.9 kWh Lithium-ion	208 km/h (129 mph)	8.5 s	FWD
Cooper E	Electric	–	–	150 kW (204 PS; 201 hp)	250 N⋅m (184 lb⋅ft)	1-speed reduction gear	Permanent-magnet synchronous	66.5 kWh Lithium-ion	170 km/h (106 mph)	8.6 s	FWD
Cooper SE	Electric	–	–	230 kW (313 PS; 308 hp)	494 N⋅m (364 lb⋅ft)	1-speed reduction gear	Permanent-magnet synchronous	66.5 kWh Lithium-ion	180 km/h (112 mph)	5.6 s	AWD

Price

=== Safety ===
Euro NCAP test results MINI Countryman SE 'Classic' (LHD) (2024)
Test	Points	%
Overall:	5 /5 stars	
Adult occupant:	33.4	83%
Child occupant:	43	87%
Pedestrian:	51.5	81%
Safety assist:	14.4	79%

ANCAP test results Mini Countryman (2024, aligned with Euro NCAP)
Test	Points	%
Overall:	5 /5 stars	
Adult occupant:	34.45	83%
Child occupant:	42.22	86%
Pedestrian:	51.52	81%
Safety assist:	15.06	83%

== Motorsports ==
In July 2010, Mini announced plans to enter the World Rally Championship (WRC) with the Countryman beginning in 2011, and entering season-long tournament starting from 2012. The Countryman WRC is the rallying version of Mini Cooper S ALL4 developed with Prodrive beginning in early 2009, with a 1.6-litre, four-cylinder turbo-charged engine from BMW Motorsport. The first test drive for the Mini Countryman WRC, which would also be available to customer teams, was planned for autumn 2010. It was unveiled at the Paris Show in 2010. The factory team had its first test outing of the 2011 WRC season at the 2011 Rally d'Italia Sardegna, before taking on the full calendar in 2012 and 2013. In the Intercontinental Rally Challenge, the RRC version had its first win at the 2012 Tour de Corse, driven by Dani Sordo. After just one season Mini terminated its works involvement in the World Rally Championship. The car continued to be used outside of the WRC, and won the 2012 Qatar International Rally and 2014 Barum Czech Rally Zlín, also taking podium finishes at the 2013 Rally of Lebanon.

The All4, equipped with a straight-six engine, has won the Dakar Rally 4 straight years beginning in 2012, with Stéphane Peterhansel driving in 2012 and cars from German Monster Energy X-raid Team won the 2013 Dakar Rally. Mini won the car category of the 2014 Dakar Rally with the All4 driven by Nani Roma. Another overall win in the 2015 Dakar Rally made it four straight wins, with a 100% finish rate. Carlos Saintz won again in 2020. The same team won the Abu Dhabi Desert Challenge five times from 2011, with other wins in the Baja Aragón, Desafio Ruta and Desafio Inca, and being the runner-up in the 2011 Silk Way Rally, 2012 Desafio Litoral Rally and 2015 Baja Russia Northern Forest.

Khalifa Al Mutaiwei win the FIA Cross Country Rally World Cup in 2012, Krzysztof Holowczyc in 2013, Vladimir Vasilyev in 2014, and Nasser Al-Attiyah in 2015.

Jean-Philippe Dayraut used a Mini Countryman to win the Andros Trophy ice racing championship in 2013 and 2014.

A 900 bhp vehicle based on the Mini Countryman entered the 2013 Pikes Peak International Hillclimb, finishing third overall.

Team JRM entered the 2015 FIA World Rallycross Championship season, acquired ex-Prodrive Minis, which unlike its competitors, using 1.6-litre engine with some concessions so the cars were able to competing with 2.0-litre engine cars. Guy Wilks reaching the final in the British round. It was also entered into the 2013 Global RallyCross Championship, with Liam Doran winning the Munich round. A further car was entered into the 2015 FIA European Rallycross Championship season, driven by Riku Tahko.

The team eventually entering FIA World Rallycross full-time, with Liam Doran as the driver. The Minis losing its concessions, as they debuted their self developed 2.0-litre engine in the fourth round in Great Britain.

== Production ==
The first generation Countryman was primarily built in Graz, Austria, under contract by Magna Steyr, making it the first of the BMW era Minis to be manufactured entirely outside the UK.

In 2013, assembly of the Countryman was expanded to three international locations: from April 2013 at BMW's plant near Chennai, India, specifically for the Indian market from June 2013 at the BMW Group Malaysia Assembly Plant in Kulim, Kedah, and at the BMW Manufacturing Thailand plant in Rayong from August 2013.

In 2012, worldwide sales of Countryman reached 102,000 units, 21,012 of which were sold in the US. In March 2013, the 250,000th Countryman was produced at Magna Steyr's Graz plant.

Since November 2016, the second generation Countryman has been assembled at VDL Nedcar in Born, the Netherlands.

Third generation Countryman production began in early 2024 at the BMW plant in Leipzig, Germany.

Year	China		
Year	Countryman	JCW	Total
2023	2,203	190	2,393
2024	1,884	168	2,052
2025	75	202	277

== See also ==
- Mini All4 Racing
