= Mini Beachcomber =

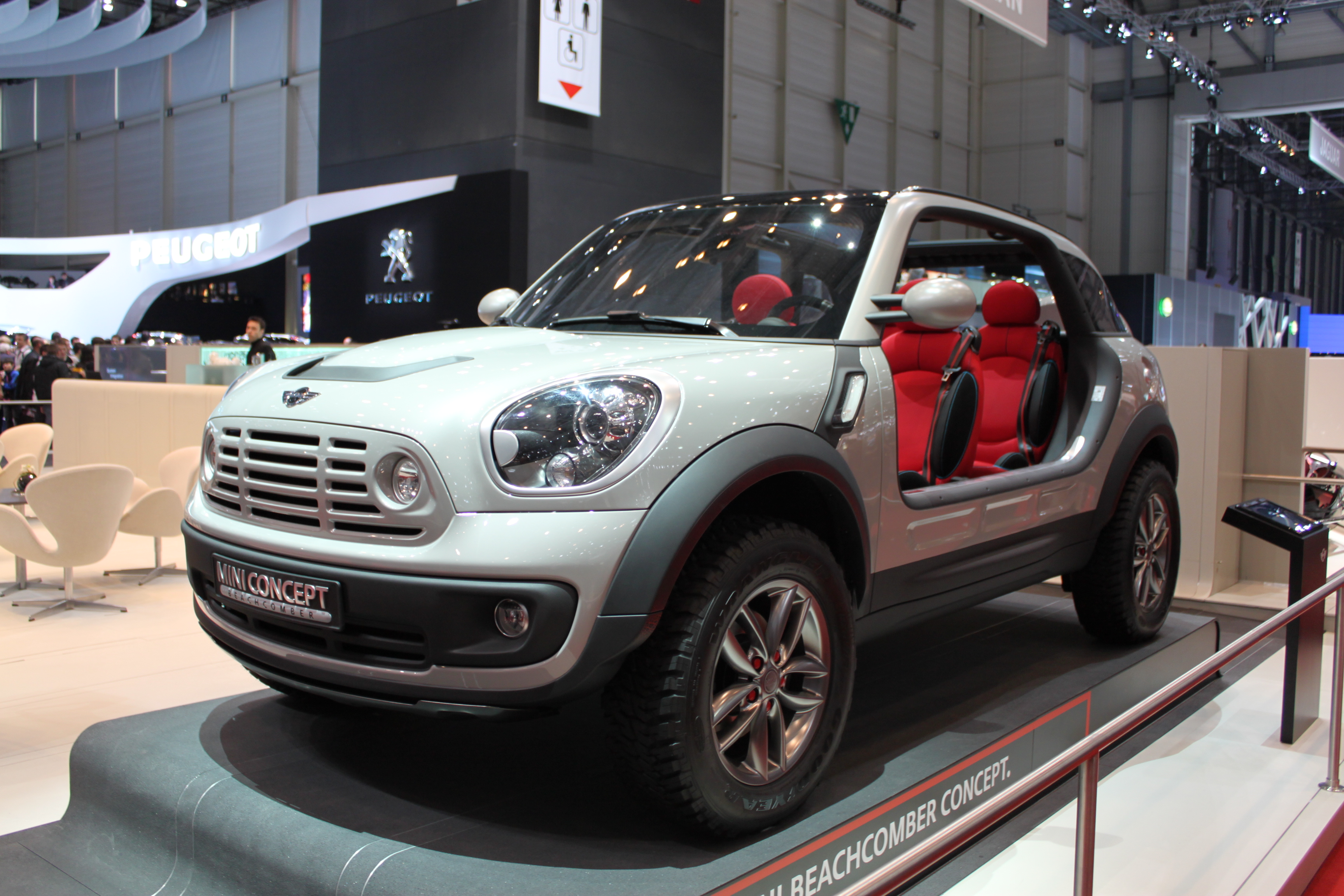
- Mini Beachcomber at the 2010 Geneva Motor Show

Overview
- Type: Concept car
- Manufacturer: Mini
- Production: 2010
- Designer: Gert Hildebrand

Body and chassis
- Body style: SUV
- Layout: Front engine, 4WD
- Platform: Mini Countryman
- Doors: 0 Doors
- Related: Mini Countryman; Mini Moke

Powertrain
- Engine: 1,995 cc (121.7 cu in; 2.0 L) BMW N47 Inline 4
- Power output: 105 kW (140.8 hp; 142.8 PS) @ 5,500 rpm 190 N⋅m (140.1 lb⋅ft) @ 2,000 rpm
- Transmission: 6-speed Manual

Dimensions
- Wheelbase: 2,595 mm (102.2 in)
- Length: 4,100 mm (161.4 in)
- Width: 1,800 mm (70.9 in)
- Height: 1,850 mm (72.8 in)
- Kerb weight: 1,400 kg (3,086.5 lb)

Chronology
- Predecessor: Mini Crossover Concept
- Successor: Mini Countryman

The MINI Beachcomber is a concept car presented by Mini at the 2010 North American International Auto Show as a preview of the Countryman crossover.

The Beachcomber has an open body concept, which according to the brand is supposed to offer an ultimate expression of freedom in a car. The concept is also a comeback to the Mini Moke, which was a symbol of adventurous motoring back in the 1960s.

The Mini concept comes with a newly developed all-wheel drivetrain and several body elements which serve to make the car extra-strong, robust and to also give it an elevated seating position.

In order to protect its occupants from wind and rain, the concept car features a soft-top roof. This protection can be completely removed from the body and stored in a container. There is also the possibility of using hardtop panels made of an extra-light plastic material, which protect the roof, the sides of the car and the rear storage compartment.
