= Pac-Man Fever =

Pac-Man Fever may refer to:

- Pac-Man Fever (album), a 1981 album by Buckner & Garcia
  - "Pac-Man Fever" (song), the 1981 title song from the album
- Pac-Man Fever (video game), a 2002 video game
- "Pac-Man Fever" (Supernatural), an episode of the American TV series Supernatural
