= Mini Paceman =

Subcompact car by BMW, 2012–2016

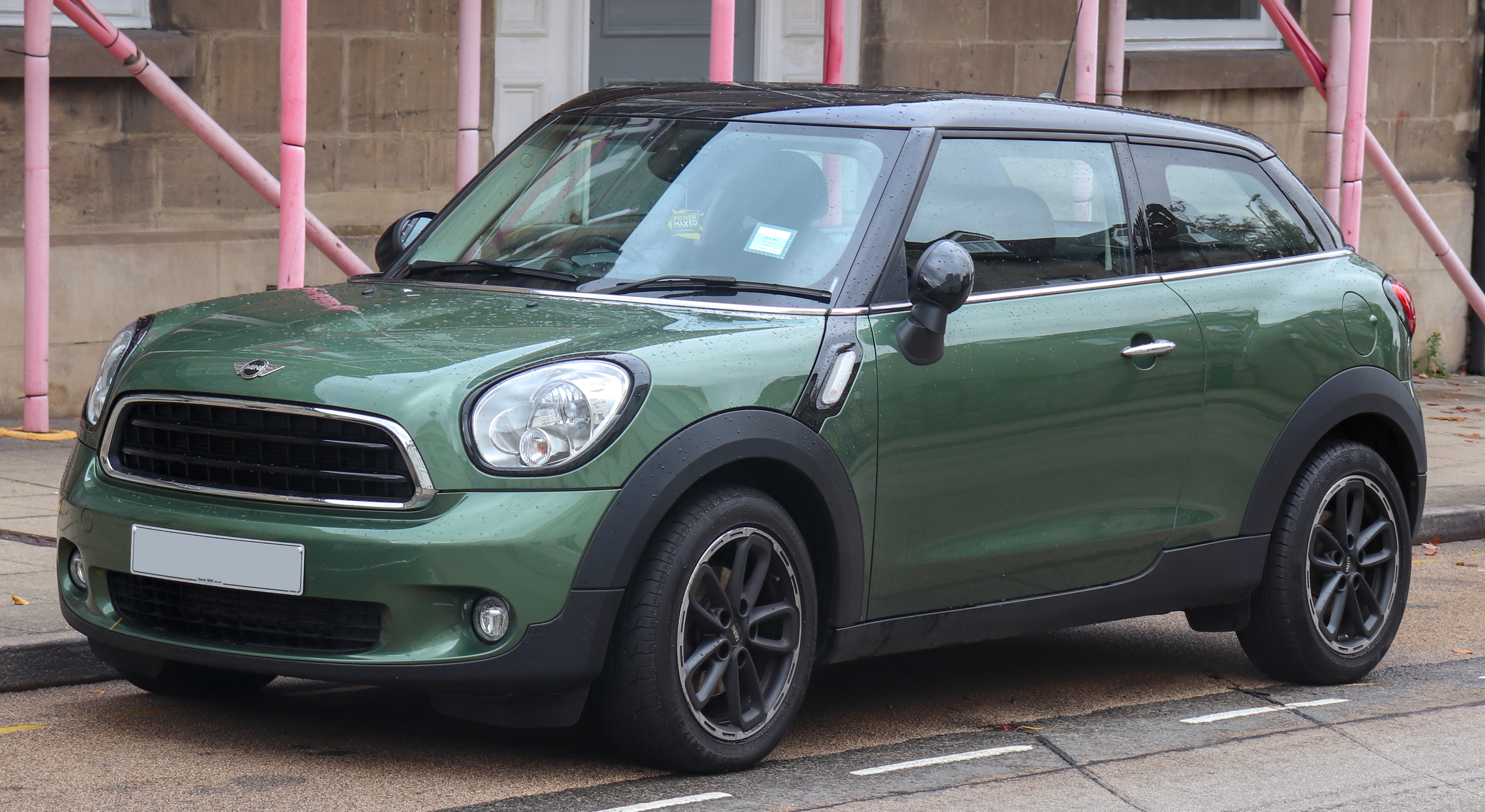

Overview
- Manufacturer: BMW (Mini)
- Model code: R61
- Production: 2012–2016
- Model years: 2013–2016
- Assembly: Austria: Graz (Magna Steyr)
- Designer: Dirk Müller-Stolz

Body and chassis
- Class: Subcompact SUV
- Body style: 3-door SUV
- Layout: Front-engine, front-wheel-drive or all-wheel-drive
- Related: Mini Countryman

Powertrain
- Engine: Petrol: 1.6 L N18B16 I4 (Cooper); 1.6 L N18B16 turbo I4 (Cooper S); Diesel: 1.6 L BMW N47D16 I4 (Cooper D); 2.0 L BMW N47D20 I4 (Cooper D auto, Cooper SD)
- Transmission: 6-speed manual 6-speed automatic

Dimensions
- Wheelbase: 2,596 mm (102.2 in)
- Length: 4,109–4,115 mm (161.8–162.0 in)
- Width: 1,786 mm (70.3 in)
- Height: 1,518 mm (59.8 in)
- Kerb weight: 1,255–1,330 kg (2,767–2,932 lb)

Chronology
- Successor: Mini Countryman (F60)

The Mini Paceman is a three-door subcompact SUV sold by German automobile manufacturer BMW under the Mini brand. It is the three-door counterpart of the R60 Mini Countryman. It was introduced as the Paceman Concept at the 2011 North American International Auto Show. The production model debuted in September 2012.

Like the Countryman, the Paceman was offered with a choice of two or four-wheel drive (known as ALL4), and with 1.6-litre petrol or diesel and 2.0-litre diesel inline four engines in various states of tune. Unlike the main Mini Cooper model, the Paceman was not built at BMW's UK plant in Cowley, Oxfordshire, but in Graz, Austria, by Magna Steyr, along with the Countryman.

BMW ended production of the Paceman in late 2016 as executives felt it was positioned too close to the Countryman in Mini’s line-up.

== Models ==
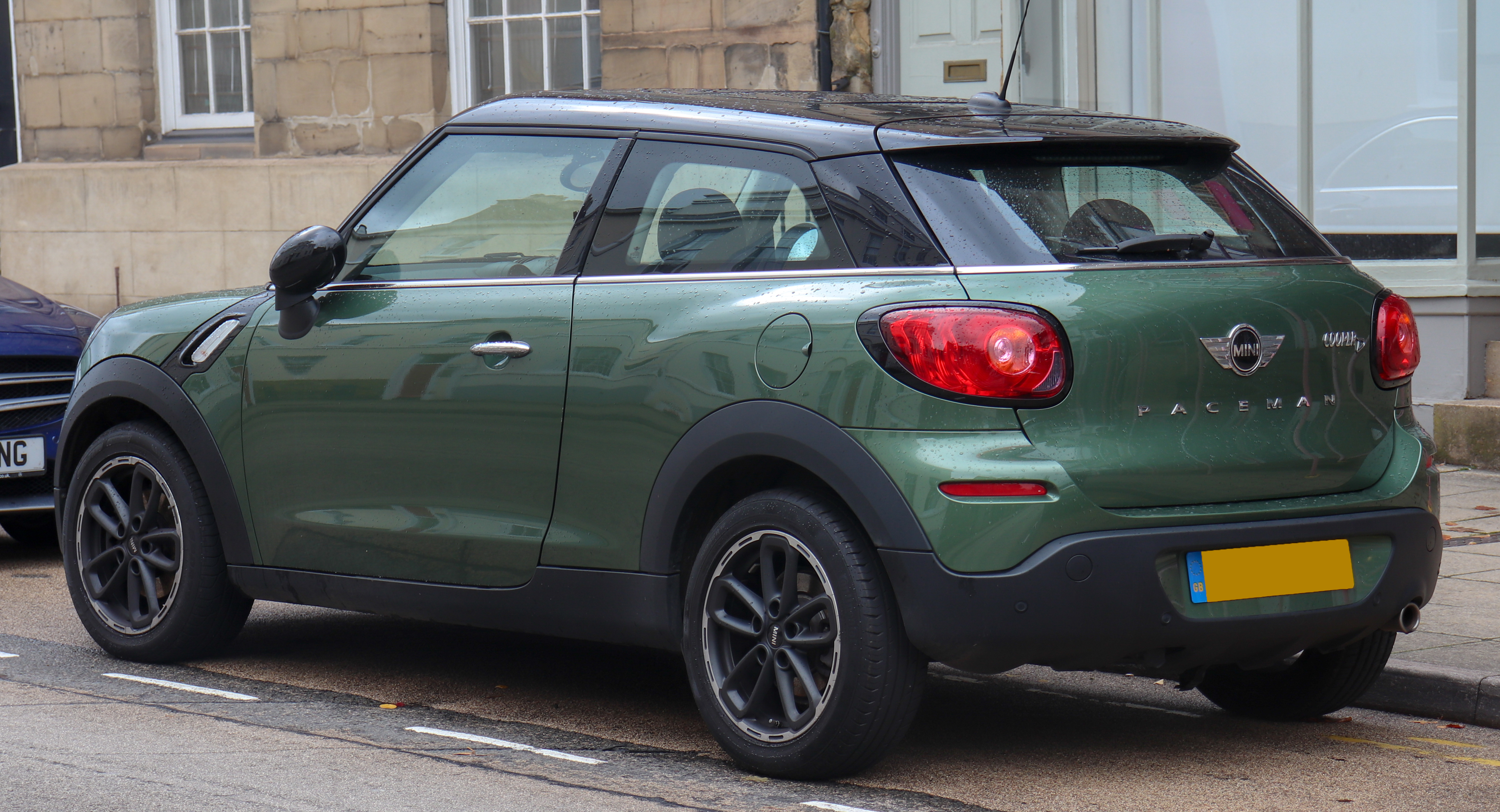
Rear

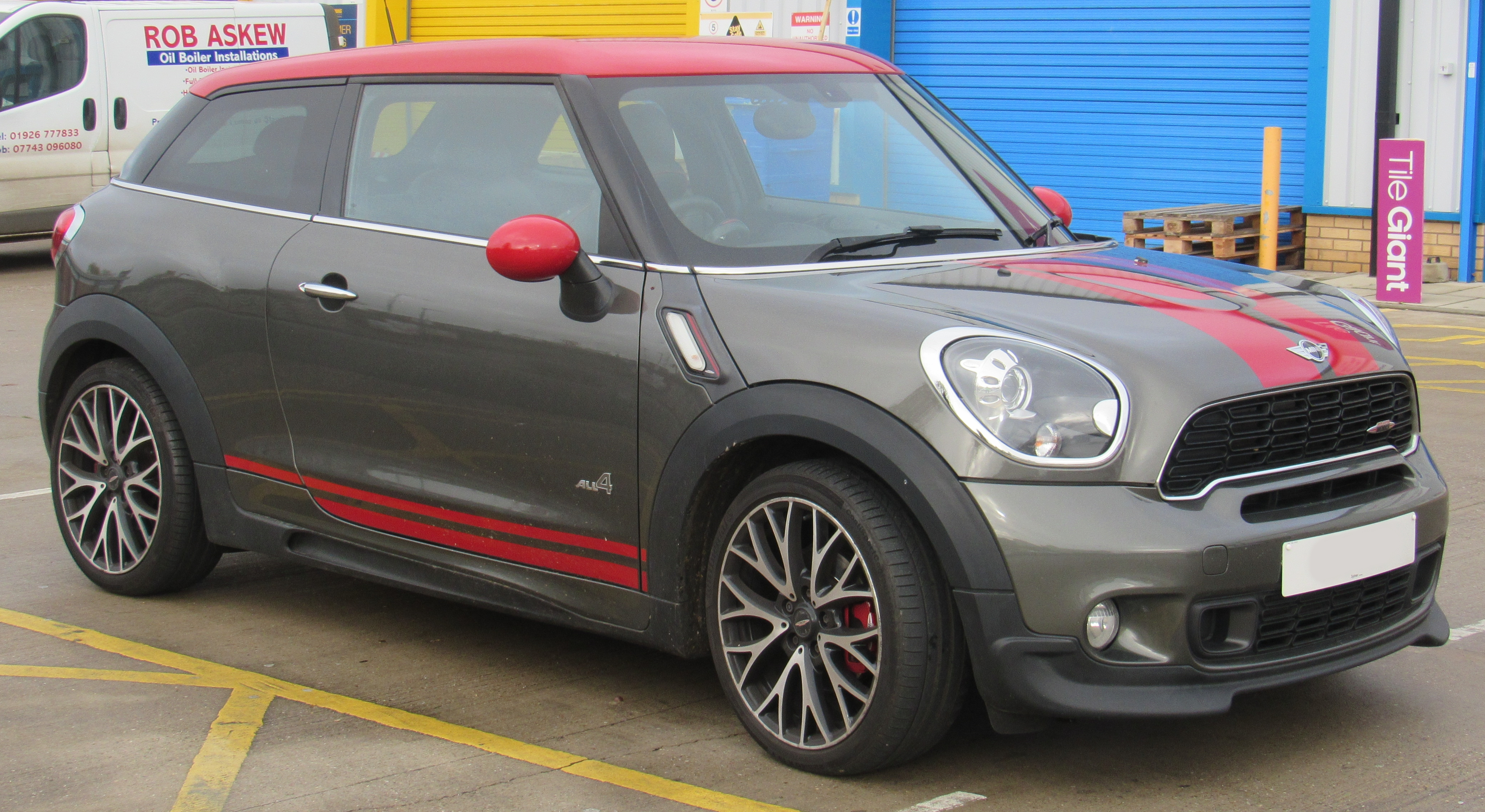

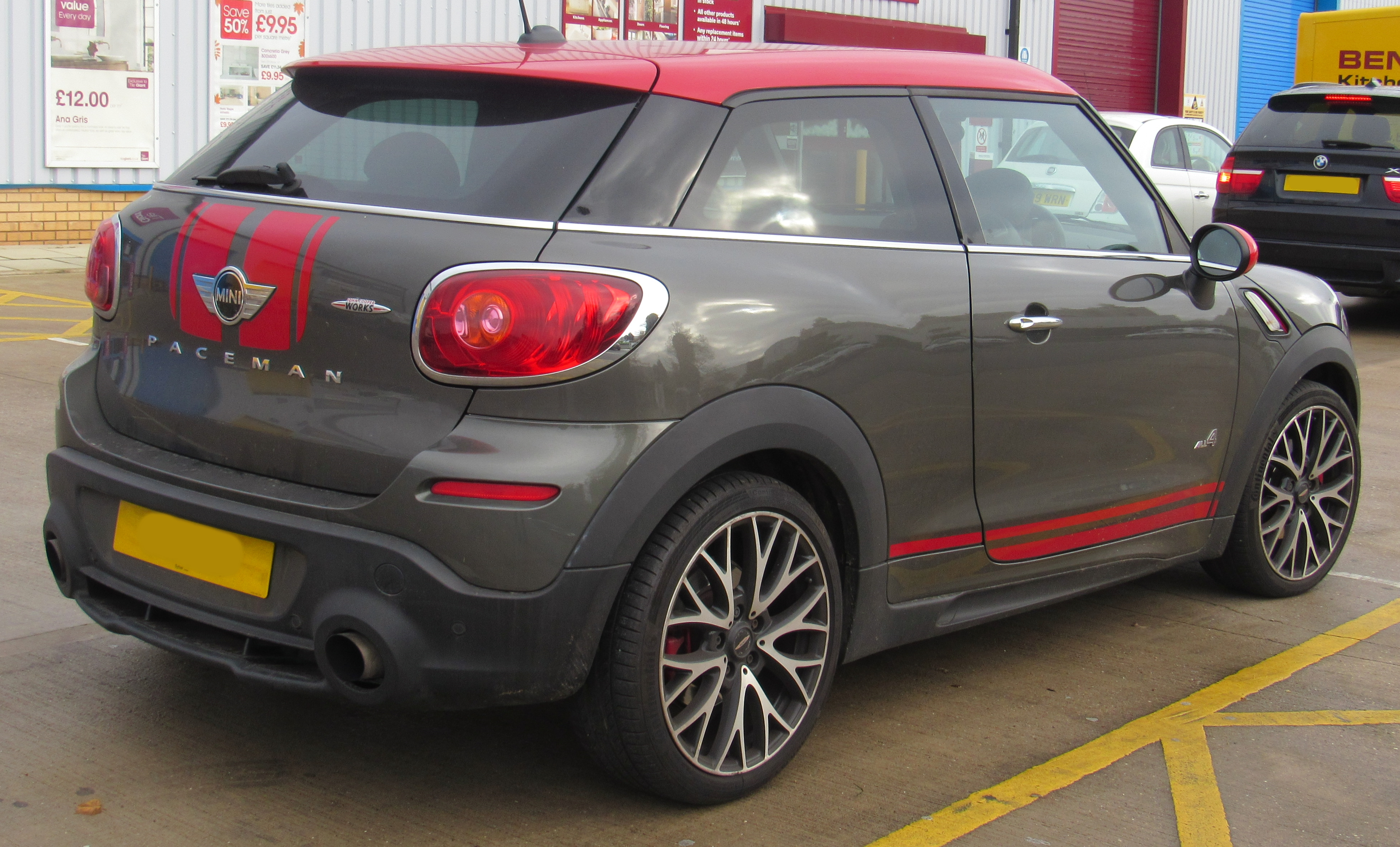
Mini Paceman John Cooper Works

The model derivatives followed a similar pattern to the Mini Hatch, with a choice of Cooper/Cooper D, Cooper S/Cooper SD and John Cooper Works derivatives.

The Cooper Petrol 122 PS (90 kW; 120 bhp) and the Cooper D 112 PS (82 kW; 110 bhp), the Cooper S Petrol 184 PS (135 kW; 181 bhp), the John Cooper Works 221 PS (163 kW; 218 bhp) and the Cooper SD Diesel producing 143 PS (105 kW; 141 bhp). The availability of models varied between markets.

The All4 all-wheel drive option was available on variable models depending on the market.
