= The Pacemakers =

The Pacemakers may refer to:

- The Pacemakers (funk band), a band led by Bootsy Collins
- The Pacemakers Drum and Bugle Corps
- Gerry and the Pacemakers
- A series of five BBC2 programmes, transmitted February/March 1965, produced by Antony de Lotbiniere and written by Antony Jay
