= Pac-Man 2 =

Pac-Man 2 may refer to:

- Ms. Pac-Man, the second game in the Pac-Man series
- Super Pac-Man, the second game officially made by Namco
- Pac-Man 2: The New Adventures, the side-scrolling puzzle game based on Pac-Man
- Pac-Man Championship Edition, Toru Iwatani's "official" sequel to the original Pac-Man for the Xbox 360 via Xbox Live Arcade
