= Richard Norberg =

U.S. American physicist (1922-2010)

Dick Norberg
- Born: December 28, 1922; Evanston, Illinois
- Died: April 20, 2010 (aged 87); Saint Louis, Missouri
- Education: DePauw University (BS 1943); University of Illinois at Urbana-Champaign (MA 1947, PhD 1951)
- Known for: NMR
- Scientific career
- Workplaces: Washington University in St. Louis
- Doctoral advisor: Charles Pence Slichter
- Other academic advisors: George Pake

Richard "Dick" E. Norberg was a professor of physics at Washington University in St. Louis. His research focused on nuclear magnetic resonance (NMR).

== Biography ==
Norberg grew up in Evanston, Illinois, studied at DePauw University, and earned his bachelor's degree in absentia in 1943 while serving in the United States Air Force in World War II. After returning in 1946, he received his master's and doctoral degrees in physics from the University of Illinois at Urbana-Champaign in 1947 and 1951, respectively, as the first Ph.D. student of Charles Slichter. He joined the physics department at Washington University in St. Louis in 1954 to work for George Pake. He was quickly hired as a professor, and served as department chair from 1962–1991. He retired in 1993 from teaching and worked part-time until 2003. Over the course of his career he advised 47 Ph.D. students. He made many contributions to NMR.

He was married and had three children.

== Awards ==
- Fellow, American Physical Society, 1957
- Alfred P. Sloan Fellow, 1955-1957
- ISMAR Prize from International Society of Magnetic Resonance, 2004
