= Pac-Man (shogi) =

Trap opening in shogi

Pac-Man
☖ pieces in hand: –

9	8	7	6	5	4	3	2	1
香	桂	銀	金	王	金	銀	桂	香	1
	飛						角		2
歩	歩	歩	歩	歩		歩	歩	歩	3
					歩				4
									5
		歩							6
歩	歩		歩	歩	歩	歩	歩	歩	7
	角						飛		8
香	桂	銀	金	玉	金	銀	桂	香	9

☗ pieces in hand: –

In shogi, the Pac-Man (パックマン pakkuman or 4四歩パックマン yon-yon-fu pakkuman) is a trap opening.

It is named after the video game Pac-Man.

The opening was called 4四歩パックリ yon-yon-fu pakkuri on the NHK shogi television show Shogi Focus (将棋フォーカス) to avoid use of the trademark.

The opening has an early pawn gambit made by White on the fourth file which may be metaphorically eaten by Black's bishop as if by Pac-Man. If Black takes the pawn with their bishop without careful thought, then the trap may succeed.

Six professional shogi players – Yoshiharu Habu, Yasumitsu Satō, Toshiyuki Moriuchi, Kōji Tanigawa, Akira Watanabe, Takeshi Fujii – agreed that the opening puts White at a disadvantage.

== Development ==
Pac-Man
☖ pieces in hand: –

9	8	7	6	5	4	3	2	1
香	桂	銀	金	王	金	銀	桂	香	1
	飛						角		2
歩	歩	歩	歩	歩		歩	歩	歩	3
					歩				4
									5
		歩							6
歩	歩		歩	歩	歩	歩	歩	歩	7
	角						飛		8
香	桂	銀	金	玉	金	銀	桂	香	9

☗ pieces in hand: –
Pac-Man
☖ pieces in hand: –

9	8	7	6	5	4	3	2	1
香	桂	銀	金	王	金	銀	桂	香	1
	飛						角		2
歩	歩	歩	歩	歩		歩	歩	歩	3
					角				4
									5
		歩							6
歩	歩		歩	歩	歩	歩	歩	歩	7
							飛		8
香	桂	銀	金	玉	金	銀	桂	香	9

☗ pieces in hand: 歩

Pac-Man
☖ pieces in hand: –

9	8	7	6	5	4	3	2	1
香	桂	銀	金	王	金	銀	桂	香	1
					飛		角		2
歩	歩	歩	歩	歩		歩	歩	歩	3
					角				4
									5
		歩							6
歩	歩		歩	歩	歩	歩	歩	歩	7
							飛		8
香	桂	銀	金	玉	金	銀	桂	香	9

☗ pieces in hand: 歩
Pac-Man
☖ pieces in hand: –

9	8	7	6	5	4	3	2	1
香	桂	銀	金	王	金	銀	桂	香	1
					飛		角		2
歩	歩	歩	歩	馬		歩	歩	歩	3
									4
									5
		歩							6
歩	歩		歩	歩	歩	歩	歩	歩	7
							飛		8
香	桂	銀	金	玉	金	銀	桂	香	9

☗ pieces in hand: 歩歩

=== Main line ===
From the second diagram, △95 Bishop becomes the winning move for Black. In response to this check, ▲68 Gold or ▲48 King will eliminate the rook's side effect, and △88 Bishop Promote will take the silver. ▲77 Silver will also move up, but △77 Bishop Right Promote ▲Same Knight △Same Bishop Promote ▲68 Gold △99 Horse (Diagram 3) will result in Black winning.

Pac-Man
☖ pieces in hand: –

9	8	7	6	5	4	3	2	1
香	桂	銀	金	王	金	銀	桂	香	1
					飛		角		2
歩	歩	歩	歩	馬			歩	歩	3
						歩			4
									5
		歩							6
歩	歩		歩	歩	歩	歩	歩	歩	7
							飛		8
香	桂	銀	金	玉	金	銀	桂	香	9

☗ pieces in hand: 歩歩

==== Double Pac-Man ====
Pac-Man
☖ pieces in hand: –

9	8	7	6	5	4	3	2	1
香	桂	銀	金	王	金	銀	桂	香	1
					飛		角		2
歩	歩	歩	歩	馬			歩	歩	3
						歩			4
									5
		歩	歩						6
歩	歩			歩	歩	歩	歩	歩	7
							飛		8
香	桂	銀	金	玉	金	銀	桂	香	9

☗ pieces in hand: 歩歩
Double Pac-Man
☖ pieces in hand: 歩

9	8	7	6	5	4	3	2	1
香	桂	銀	金	王	金	銀	桂	香	1
					飛				2
歩	歩	歩	歩	馬			歩	歩	3
						歩			4
									5
		歩	角						6
歩	歩			歩	歩	歩	歩	歩	7
			飛						8
香	桂	銀	金	玉	金	銀	桂	香	9

☗ pieces in hand: 歩歩

=== Rook promotion line ===
Pac-Man
☖ pieces in hand: –

9	8	7	6	5	4	3	2	1
香	桂	銀	金	王	金	銀	桂	香	1
							角		2
歩	歩	歩	歩	馬		歩	歩	歩	3
									4
									5
		歩							6
歩	歩		歩	歩	龍	歩	歩	歩	7
							飛		8
香	桂	銀	金	玉	金	銀	桂	香	9

☗ pieces in hand: 歩歩

== Bibliography ==
- 湯川 [Yukawa], 博士 [Hiroshi] [in Japanese] (1989). 奇襲大全. 毎日コミュニケーションズ. ISBN 978-4-8399-0177-6.
