= The Pacemaker =

Pocket-sized DJ system

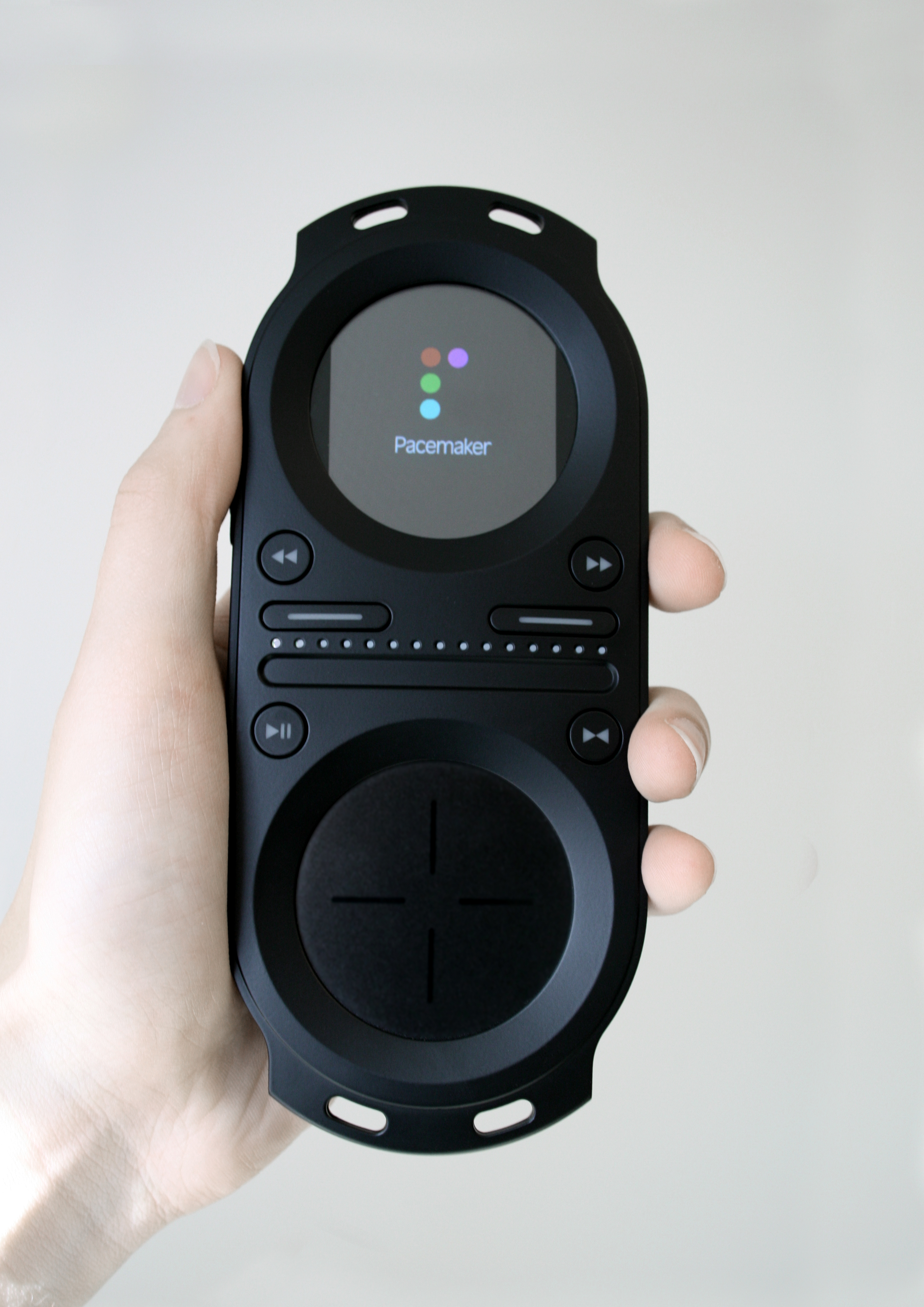
Tonium Pacemaker

The Pacemaker is a pocket-size DJ system invented by Jonas Norberg. The device features include a 120 GB hard drive, a signal-to-noise ratio of 103, and many basic DJ audio tools, including line out and headphone crossfaders and jacks, bend, pitch, DJ pause, cue points, loop, equalisation, filter, sound effects, and a USB 2.0 connector.

== History ==
As of 2008-10-02, the Pacemaker supports MP3, variable bitrate, AAC, OGG Vorbis, FLAC, AIFF, SND (file) and WAV.

In 2007 the physical device was showcased at the Sónar Festival in Barcelona in June, on Ibiza in July and at IFA Berlin and PLASA trade shows. It was also at the Amsterdam dance event.

Originally scheduled for release in February 2008, slight delays pushed it back to March 2008 when the first units were shipped. The first release of the device was to the first 2000 people who pre-ordered (all of whom received the "Premier Edition" of the device).

Using his Tonium Pacemaker, DJ JMS made history in 2009 being the first DJ to play a wireless set to over 5,000 people in the UK's biggest dance club. Pacemaker is being used by top DJs in US, Australia, UK and the Netherlands. India's DJ Loch is said to be the only DJ from India to have adopted this latest technology. The same is for Ukraine, where DJ Garazd was the sole artist, who performed using the Tonium Pacemaker "Premier Edition" with the serial number 00AA000100021 (the 21st unit in the world). He also was one of the first, who adapted his Pacemaker for wireless using. The first wireless performance of DJ Garazd with the Pacemaker was in August 2008, in one of the biggest clubs near Rivne, Ukraine.

In October 2008, Pacemaker received the world's most prestigious DJ Technology award: the DJ Mag Tech Awards in the category "Most Innovative New DJ Product".

In 2010, due to poor sales, the Pacemaker product line was discontinued to be replaced by an upcoming app for the Blackberry Playbook which was scheduled for release in the second quarter of 2012.

On 12 October 2012, pacemakerdevice.org was launched, a community run website currently sponsored by Pacemaker.net for the owners of the original Pacemaker Device. The site contains downloads for the Pacemaker editor, firmware and manuals. A dedicated forum was launched at the same time too.

On 4 February 2014, the Pacemakerdevice.org and the Pacemaker Team announced a new version of the Pacemaker firmware (dfw_146061537.pfw).

== Technical specifications ==
The Pacemaker weighs 200 g. It has a length of 164 mm, a width of 69.6 mm, and a depth of 22.8 mm. Its user input latency is less than 5 milliseconds. Its playback time for music is 18 hours and 5 hours for DJ playback.

== See also ==
- Digital audio player
