= Lucas Cruz =

Spanish rally co-driver (born 1974)

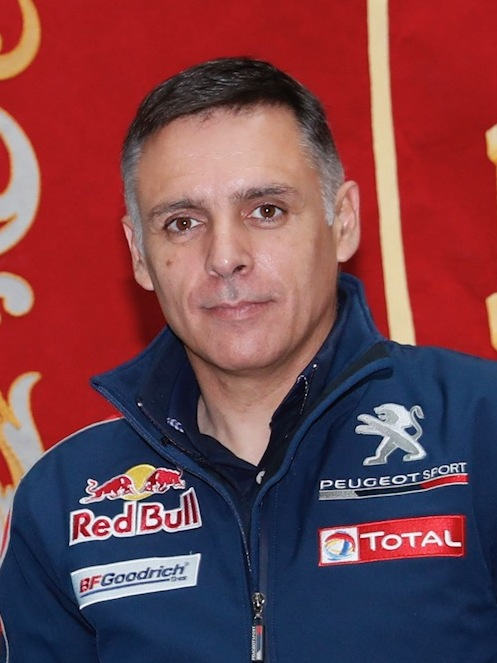
Lucas Cruz (2018).

Lucas Cruz Senra (Note: In this Spanish name, the first or paternal surname is Cruz and the second or maternal family name is Senra.) (born 26 December 1974 in Barcelona) is a Spanish computer engineer, mostly known as a rally racing co-driver and experienced navigator.

== Career ==
Cruz started to race in 1994, when he competed on the Catalonia Rally Championship. On 2001, he achieved his first victory in the Spanish Championship, together with the driver Txus Jaio on board a Ford Focus WRC, as part of the Carlos Sainz Junior Team.

After a few years racing on tarmac and gravel categories, Cruz started to compete on off-road races with the driver José Luis Monterde, finishing the 2001 Dakar Rally as the first classified rookies and amateurs, driving a Nissan Patrol GR.

Cruz tackled 2006 Dakar Rally as a truck co-driver for the Volkswagen Motorsport team, partnering with driver Josep Pujol.

In 2007, Cruz signed for Mitsubishi, where he stayed for two years, along with Nani Roma as new teammate. They attended to 2007 and 2009 Dakar Rally, achieving tenth place as the best result on final classification. They also finished second on Rally Transibérico and Baja Spain competitions in 2007, and second again on the 2008 Baja Spain.

In May 2009, Cruz returned to Volkswagen team, this time to share the cockpit with former World Champion Carlos Sainz. The pairing achieved their first successes after winning the Rally dos Sertões and the Silk Way Rally. The team formed by Sainz-Cruz completed their most important achievement after winning the 2010 Dakar Rally, ahead of another two Volkswagen cars, driven by Nasser Al-Attiyah and Mark Miller, respectively.

Cruz has gone onto win the 2018 Dakar Rally and 2020 Dakar Rally alongside Carlos Sainz, driving for Peugeot and Mini respectively.

Cruz also won the 2024 Dakar Rally alongside Carlos Sainz, this time with the Audi RS Q e-tron.

== Dakar Rally results ==
2007	2008	2009	2010	2018	2020	2024
13th	DNS	10th	1st	1st	1st	1st
