= Dirk von Zitzewitz =

German racing driver and motorcyclist

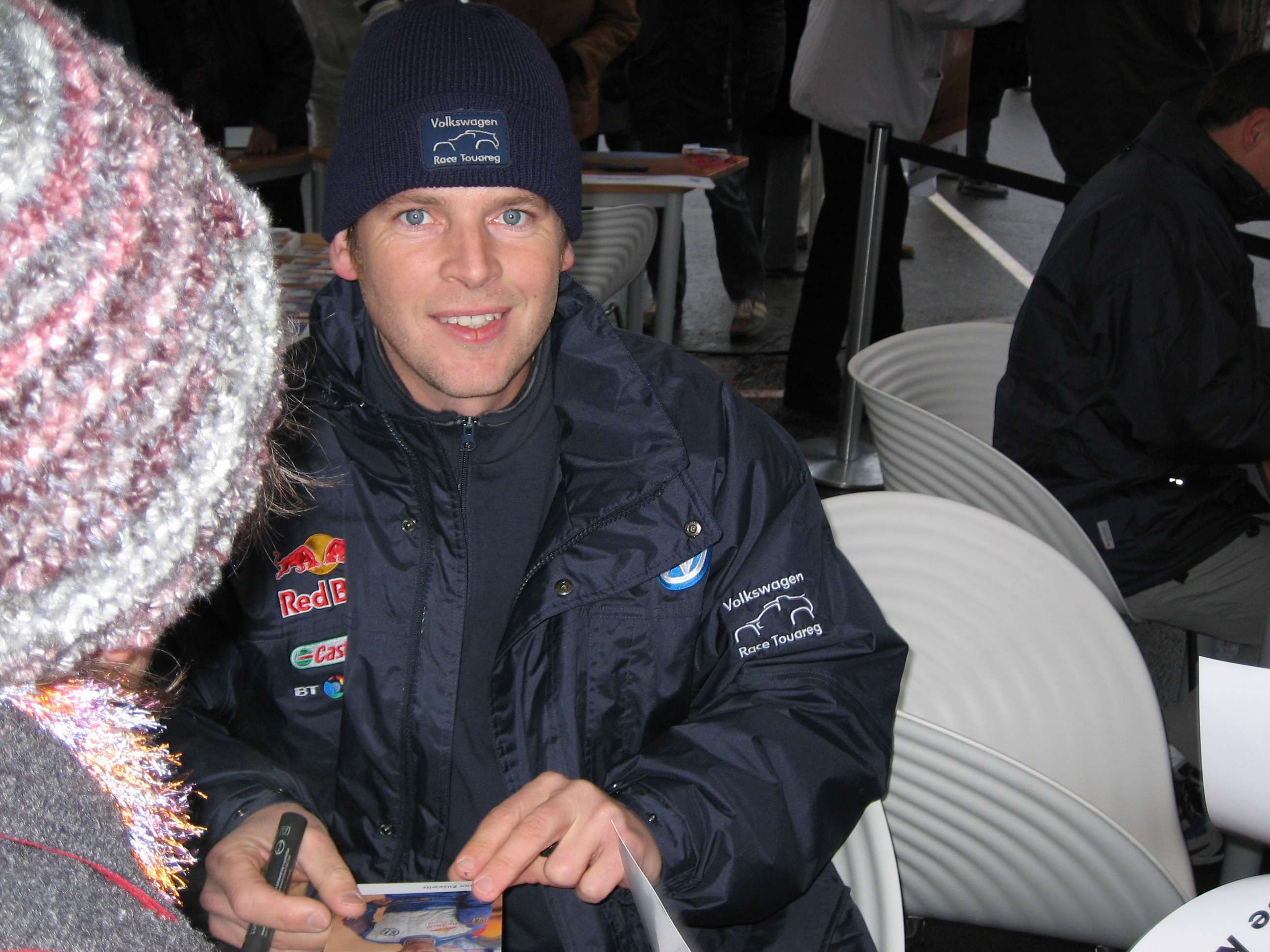
Dirk von Zitzewitz in 2005

Dirk von Zitzewitz (born 14 October 1968, in Eutin) is a German professional racing driver and motorcyclist, most notable for being on the winning team of the 2009 Dakar Rally alongside Giniel de Villiers.

== Career ==
Von Zitzewitz started his career age 14, and after considerable success in domestic and world enduro competition he began to participate in the Dakar Rally, making his debut in 1997. He finished fifth overall aboard at KTM, and was classified seventh the following year. Von Zitzewitz then took his maiden stage victories in the 1999 event, although he failed to finish the rally.

Von Zitzewitz turned his hand to navigation, partnering American Mark Miller during the Dakar in 2002. In 2005, he joined the works Volkswagen team as co-driver to Robby Gordon, finishing in twelfth, and re-joined Miller in 2006 to finish fifth in the overall classification.

Von Zitzewitz took his first Dakar stage wins as co-driver to Giniel de Villiers in 2007, but turbo failure meant the pair would only finish eleventh overall. When the event resumed in South America in 2009, von Zitzewitz and de Villiers won four stages en route to an overall victory, albeit aided by retirement for long-time leader and Volkswagen teammate Carlos Sainz. The pair were unable to defend their title in 2010 due to a severe engine problem during the third stage of the rally, but then finished in a strong runner-up place to Nasser Al-Attiyah, also at the wheel of a works Volkswagen, in the 2011 event.

With Volkswagen withdrawing their participation in 2012, von Zitzewitz and de Villiers joined the South African Imperial Toyota team and finished in third place driving a Toyota Hilux. They repeated their success with overall second place in 2013, fourth in 2014, and posted second place again in the 2015 Dakar Rally.
