= Subaru Elaion =

Overview
- Type: Modified car
- Manufacturer: Subaru, Elaion (Repsol-YPF)
- Also called: Subaru Forester BaraTEC Raid T1
- Production: 2009

Body and chassis
- Class: Compact crossover SUV
- Body style: 5-door

Powertrain
- Engine: 2.0 litre, 4-cylinder (turbocharged)

The Subaru Elaion is a modified Subaru Forester which was built by Subaru and Elaion (Repsol-YPF) to compete between Argentina and Chile in the 2010 Dakar Rally.

It has Subaru's signature 2.0-litre, 4-cylinder boxer engine, which produces 300bhp and 420 lb⋅ft (570 N⋅m) of torque. The car has a carbon-fibre and Kevlar body, and has a 9 in (23 cm) ground clearance.
