= Juan Manuel González Corominas =

Spanish motorcycle racer (born 1968)

Juan Manuel González Corominas (born May 24, 1968 in Navàs, Barcelona), also known as Pedregá, is a Spanish off-road motorbike and ATV driver.

He started racing on enduro categories in 1988. In 2001, he started to race on off-road quad races.

He has competed in the Dakar Rally, driving a quad, since 2005, being able to lead the general classification and win several stages. He won the 2006 Dakar Rally in quads category.

== Honors ==
- 1996 Enduro Spanish Championship
- 2001 Quads Spanish Championship
- 2002 Baja Aragón
- 2006 Dakar Rally
