= Luca Manca =

Italian motorcycle racer

Luca Manca (born c. 1980) is an Italian motorcycle racer who competes in rally raid events. Manca has won stages of the Rallye des Pharaons in Egypt, and also has competed in the Dakar Rally and Rally d'Italia Sardegna.

On 7 January 2010, near Antofagasta, Chile, Manca was involved in a serious accident. He was approximately 10 km (6.2 mi) into the sixth stage of the 2010 Dakar Rally while riding his KTM. He suffered a brain contusion in the accident, and was transferred by helicopter to Hospital del Cobre Dr. Salvador Allende Gossens in Calama, Chile, before being transferred to the neuro-surgical unit of Clínica de la Mutual de Seguridad in Santiago, Chile. This came a day after Manca had generously surrendered his rear wheel to defending champion Marc Coma when his fellow KTM rider's tire burst. Manca was placed in an induced coma and on a ventilator. By 15 January 2010, Manca was breathing on his own and speaking with family members.
