= 2010 Dakar Rally =

Off-road motorsport event in Argentina and Chile

← Previous event	Next event →
- Route of the rally across Argentina and Chile.
- Host country: Argentina; Chile

Results
- Cars winner: (Spain) Carlos Sainz (Spain) Lucas Cruz; Volkswagen
- Bikes winner: (France) Cyril Despres; KTM
- Quads winner: (Argentina) Marcos Patronelli; Yamaha
- Trucks winner: (Russia) Vladimir Chagin (Russia) Sergey Savostin (Russia) Eduard Nikolaev; Kamaz

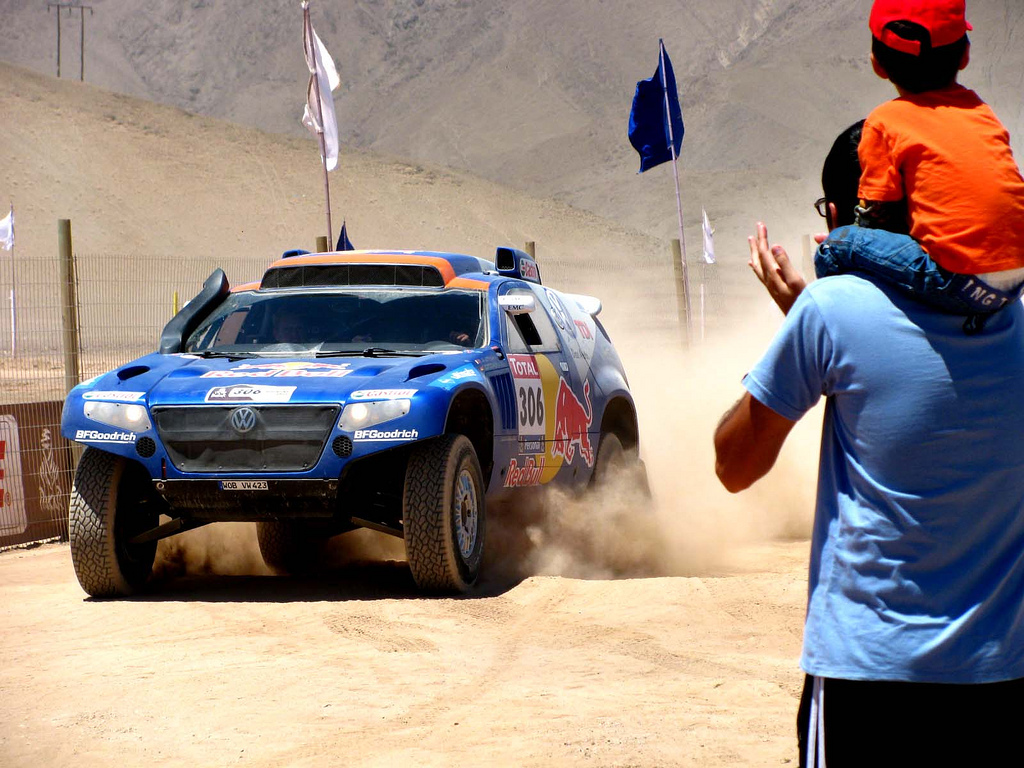
Nasser Al-Attiyah and Timo Gottschalk during the ninth stage; they finished second in the cars class, behind team-mates Carlos Sainz and Lucas Cruz.

The 2010 Dakar Rally was the 32nd running of the event. It was held in South America for the second successive time, and ran from 1 to 16 January. The Amaury Sport Organisation and the governments of Argentina and Chile agreed to a return to South America for the event in February 2009.

Cyril Despres, riding a KTM, won the motorcycle class for the third time, winning two stages en route to victory by over an hour from any of his rivals. Second place went to another KTM rider, as Pål Anders Ullevålseter finished on the Dakar podium for the first time in his career, taking a stage win on the penultimate day. Aprilia rider Francisco López Contardo finished in third position, just under seven minutes behind Ullevålseter, taking three stage victories. Other stage wins were taken by Sherco's David Casteu, Yamaha's David Frétigné, as well as the KTMs of Rubén Faria and defending class winner Marc Coma; Coma won the most stages in the event, taking four wins. The ATV class was held independent of the motorcycle class for the first time, and was dominated by the Yamaha-riding Patronelli brothers Marcos and Alejandro, who finished first and second in class. Juan Manuel González Corominas finished third on another Yamaha, over five hours behind Marcos Patronelli. The Patronellis took six stage wins, with the other eight shared by the Polaris duo of Hubert Deltrieu, and Christophe Declerck (3), as well as the Yamahas of Sebastian Halpern (2), González Corominas and Rafal Sonik.

Volkswagen won their third Dakar in succession in the cars class, with Carlos Sainz, the 2008 relocated race winner, winning his second Dakar, following in the footsteps of team-mate Giniel de Villiers, who won the event in 2009. Sainz finished two minutes clear of another Volkswagen, piloted by Nasser Al-Attiyah, with a third Volkswagen of Mark Miller completing the podium, half an hour behind Al-Attiyah. Al-Attiyah and BMW's Stéphane Peterhansel both won four stages during the event, with other stage wins taken by the Volkswagens of Sainz (2) and Miller, as well as BMW pairing Nani Roma and Guerlain Chicherit, and the Hummer of Robby Gordon. Defending class winner Vladimir Chagin dominated the trucks class, winning nine of the fourteen stages en route to a 73-minute victory over Kamaz team-mate Firdaus Kabirov, with GINAF's Marcel van Vliet a further nine and a half hours behind in third.

== Entrants ==
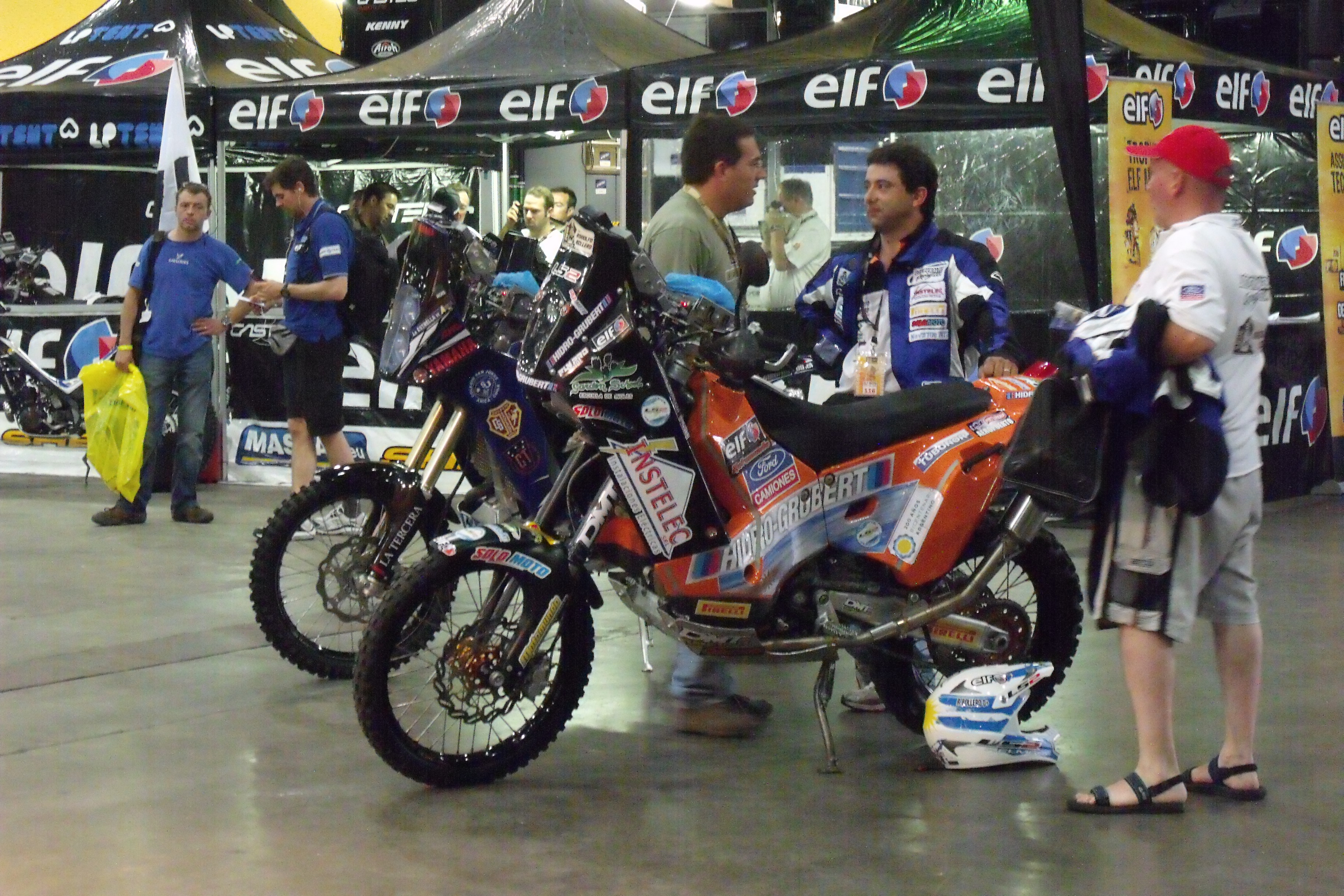
Technical Review at Buenos Aires

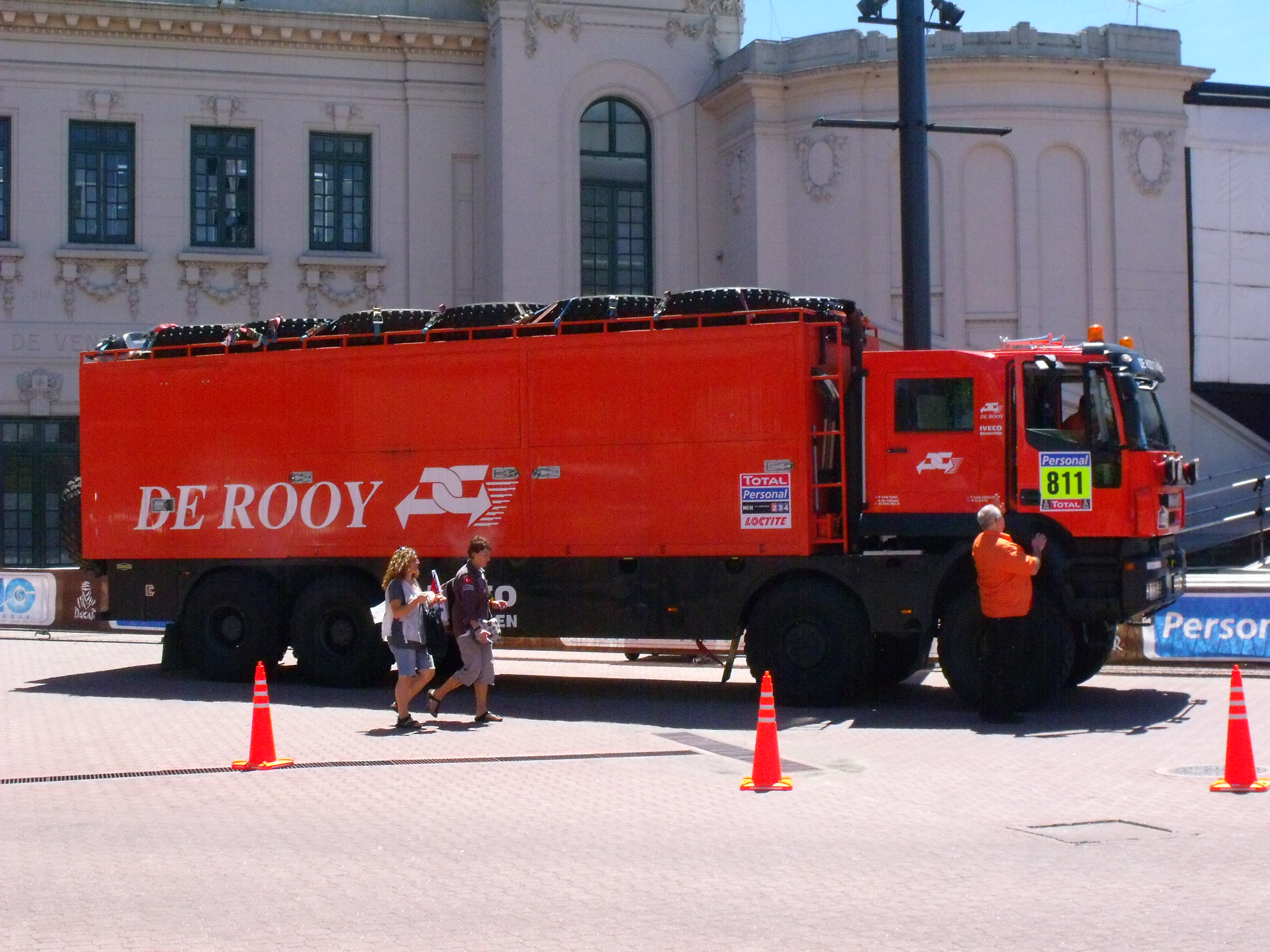
Support Truck at Buenos Aires

362 Teams competed in the race with 176 motorcycles and all-terrain vehicles, 134 cars, and 52 trucks on the podium across from the Obelisk, on the 9th of July Avenue; one of Buenos Aires' major boulevards. Notable contenders were former Formula 1 driver Jan Lammers participating for Jumbo Team GINAF in the Truck Class and Formula 1 driver Esteban Tuero competing for Tuero RXZ Racing by MINI in the Car Class.

== The route ==
2010 Dakar Rally route

The race began on New Year's Day in downtown Buenos Aires. The total racing distance was 9,030 kilometres (5,610 mi) for cars and trucks, and 8,937 kilometres (5,553 mi) for bikes and ATVs. Of these distances, 4,810 kilometres (2,990 mi) was timed special stage for cars and trucks, with 93 kilometres (58 mi) less for bikes and ATVs. Of the fourteen stages, seven were in Argentina, and seven in Chile.

=== Stages ===
- For the first two stages, there were varying distances for Bikes/Quads and Cars/Trucks. The distances of the Bikes/Quads are displayed first.

Stage	Date	From	To	Connection		Special		Connection		Total		Stage winners			
Stage	Date	From	To	km	mi	km	mi	km	mi	km	mi	Bikes	Quads	Cars	Trucks
1	1 January; 2 January	(Argentina) Buenos Aires (Argentina) Colón	(Argentina) Colón (Argentina) Córdoba	349	217	219	136	84	52	652	405	(France) D. Casteu	(Argentina) M. Patronelli	(Spain) N. Roma	(Russia) V. Chagin
1	1 January; 2 January	(Argentina) Buenos Aires (Argentina) Colón	(Argentina) Colón (Argentina) Córdoba	349	217	251	156	84	52	684	425	(France) D. Casteu	(Argentina) M. Patronelli	(Spain) N. Roma	(Russia) V. Chagin
2	3 January	(Argentina) Córdoba	(Argentina) La Rioja	56	35	294	183	276	171	626	389	(France) D. Frétigné	(France) H. Deltrieu	(Qatar) N. Al-Attiyah	(Russia) V. Chagin
2	3 January	(Argentina) Córdoba	(Argentina) La Rioja	56	35	355	221	276	171	687	427	(France) D. Frétigné	(France) H. Deltrieu	(Qatar) N. Al-Attiyah	(Russia) V. Chagin
3	4 January	(Argentina) La Rioja	(Argentina) Fiambalá	259	161	182	113	0	0	441	274	(France) C. Despres	(Argentina) S. Halpern	(France) S. Peterhansel	(Russia) V. Chagin
4	5 January	(Argentina) Fiambalá	(Chile) Copiapó	394	245	203	126	32	20	629	391	(Spain) M. Coma	(Argentina) A. Patronelli	(United States) R. Gordon	(Russia) V. Chagin
5	6 January	(Chile) Copiapó	(Chile) Antofagasta	90	56	483	300	97	60	670	416	(Chile) F. López	(Argentina) M. Patronelli	(United States) M. Miller	(Russia) F. Kabirov
6	7 January	(Chile) Antofagasta	(Chile) Iquique	180	112	418	260	0	0	598	372	(Spain) M. Coma	(Argentina) M. Patronelli	(France) S. Peterhansel	(Russia) V. Chagin
7	8 January	(Chile) Iquique	(Chile) Antofagasta	37	23	600	373	4	2	621	386	(France) C. Despres	(Argentina) A. Patronelli	(Qatar) N. Al-Attiyah	(Russia) V. Chagin
–	9 January	(Chile) Antofagasta		Rest day											
8	10 January	(Chile) Antofagasta	(Chile) Copiapó	96	60	472	293	0	0	568	353	(Chile) F. López	(Argentina) M. Patronelli	(France) S. Peterhansel	(Russia) V. Chagin
9	11 January	(Chile) Copiapó	(Chile) La Serena	0	0	338	210	209	130	547	340	(Spain) M. Coma	(France) C. Declerck	(Qatar) N. Al-Attiyah	(Russia) F. Kabirov
10	12 January	(Chile) La Serena	(Chile) Santiago	112	70	238	148	236	147	586	364	(Spain) M. Coma	(Spain) J. M. González	(Spain) C. Sainz	(Russia) V. Chagin
11	13 January	(Chile) Santiago	(Argentina) San Juan	211	131	220	137	3	2	434	270	(Spain) M. Coma	(Argentina) S. Halpern	(France) G. Chicherit	(Russia) F. Kabirov
12	14 January	(Argentina) San Juan	(Argentina) San Rafael	23	14	476	296	297	185	796	495	(Chile) F. López	(France) C. Declerck	(Spain) C. Sainz	(Russia) V. Chagin
13	15 January	(Argentina) San Rafael	(Argentina) Santa Rosa	76	47	368	229	281	175	725	450	(Norway) P. A. Ullevålseter	(France) C. Declerck	(France) S. Peterhansel	(Russia) F. Kabirov
14	16 January	(Argentina) Santa Rosa	(Argentina) Buenos Aires	166	103	206	128	335	208	707	439	(Portugal) R. Faria	(Poland) R. Sonik	(Qatar) N. Al-Attiyah	(Russia) I. Mardeev
TOTALS				km	mi	km	mi	km	mi	km	mi				
Bikes & All-Terrain Vehicles				2,366	1,470	4,717	2,931	1,854	1,152	8,937	5,553				
Cars & Trucks				2,366	1,470	4,810	2,989	1,854	1,152	9,030	5,611				

== Stage results ==
- ↓ Denotes competitor given post-stage penalty which was added to overall time, not stage time.

=== Motorcycles ===
	Stage result					General classification				
Stage	Pos	Competitor	Make	Time	Difference	Pos	Competitor	Make	Time	Difference
1	1	D. Casteu (FRA)	Sherco	1h 50' 42"	+ 00' 00"	1	D. Casteu (FRA)	Sherco	1h 50' 42"	+ 00' 00"
1	2	C. Despres (FRA)	KTM	1h 50' 45"	+ 00' 03"	2	C. Despres (FRA)	KTM	1h 50' 45"	+ 00' 03"
1	3	M. Coma (ESP)	KTM	1h 50' 54"	+ 00' 12"	3	M. Coma (ESP)	KTM	1h 50' 54"	+ 00' 12"
2	1	D. Frétigné (FRA)	Yamaha	3h 59' 20"	+ 00' 00"	1	D. Casteu (FRA)	Sherco	5h 50' 45"	+ 00' 00"
2	2	D. Casteu (FRA)	Sherco	4h 00' 03"	+ 00' 43"	2	C. Despres (FRA)	KTM	5h 52' 55"	+ 02' 10"
2	3	M. Coma (ESP) ↓	KTM ↓	4h 00' 28"	+ 01' 08"	3	D. Frétigné (FRA)	Yamaha	5h 52' 59"	+ 02' 14"
3	1	C. Despres (FRA)	KTM	3h 01' 09"	+ 00' 00"	1	C. Despres (FRA)	KTM	8h 54' 04"	+ 00' 00"
3	2	H. Rodrigues (POR)	Yamaha	3h 11' 49"	+ 10' 40"	2	D. Casteu (FRA)	Sherco	9h 04' 07"	+ 10' 03"
3	3	P. Gonçalves (POR)	BMW	3h 13' 18"	+ 12' 09"	3	H. Rodrigues (POR)	Yamaha	9h 12' 01"	+ 17' 57"
4	1	M. Coma (ESP)	KTM	1h 46' 58"	+ 00' 00"	1	C. Despres (FRA)	KTM	10h 44' 16"	+ 00' 00"
4	2	D. Casteu (FRA)	Sherco	1h 49' 02"	+ 02' 04"	2	D. Casteu (FRA)	Sherco	10h 53' 09"	+ 08' 53"
4	3	C. Despres (FRA)	KTM	1h 50' 12"	+ 03' 14"	3	H. Rodrigues (POR)	Yamaha	11h 08' 01"	+ 23' 45"
5	1	F. López (CHI)	Aprilia	5h 52' 40"	+ 00' 00"	1	C. Despres (FRA)	KTM	16h 38' 26"	+ 00' 00"
5	2	C. Despres (FRA)	KTM	5h 54' 10"	+ 01' 30"	2	F. López (CHI)	Aprilia	17h 16' 03"	+ 37' 37"
5	3	D. Frétigné (FRA)	Yamaha	6h 01' 53"	+ 09' 13"	3	H. Rodrigues (POR)	Yamaha	17h 22' 27"	+ 44' 01"
6	1	M. Coma (ESP)	KTM	4h 46' 59"	+ 00' 00"	1	C. Despres (FRA)	KTM	21h 35' 59"	+ 00' 00"
6	2	C. Despres (FRA)	KTM	4h 57' 33"	+ 10' 34"	2	F. López (CHI)	Aprilia	22h 18' 14"	+ 42' 15"
6	3	H. Rodrigues (POR)	Yamaha	4h 57' 37"	+ 10' 38"	3	H. Rodrigues (POR)	Yamaha	22h 20' 04"	+ 44' 05"
7	1	C. Despres (FRA)	KTM	6h 34' 14"	+ 00' 00"	1	C. Despres (FRA)	KTM	28h 10' 13"	+ 00' 00"
7	2	D. Frétigné (FRA)	Yamaha	6h 39' 14"	+ 05' 00"	2	H. Rodrigues (POR)	Yamaha	29h 30' 21"	+ 1h 20' 08"
7	3	R. Faria (POR)	KTM	6h 43' 24"	+ 09' 10"	3	P. A. Ullevålseter (NOR)	KTM	29h 36' 05"	+ 1h 25' 52"
8	1	F. López (CHI)	Aprilia	5h 29' 25"	+ 00' 00"	1	C. Despres (FRA)	KTM	33h 46' 21"	+ 00' 00"
8	2	M. Coma (ESP)	KTM	5h 30' 07"	+ 00' 42"	2	P. A. Ullevålseter (NOR)	KTM	35h 06' 52"	+ 1h 20' 31"
8	3	P. A. Ullevålseter (NOR)	KTM	5h 30' 47"	+ 01' 22"	3	F. López (CHI)	Aprilia	35h 10' 42"	+ 1h 24' 21"
9	1	M. Coma (ESP)	KTM	2h 12' 30"	+ 00' 00"	1	C. Despres (FRA)	KTM	35h 58' 55"	+ 00' 00"
9	2	C. Despres (FRA)	KTM	2h 12' 34"	+ 00' 04"	2	P. A. Ullevålseter (NOR)	KTM	37h 20' 45"	+ 1h 21' 50"
9	3	F. López (CHI)	Aprilia	2h 13' 44"	+ 01' 14"	3	F. López (CHI)	Aprilia	37h 24' 26"	+ 1h 25' 31"
10	1	M. Coma (ESP)	KTM	3h 10' 43"	+ 00' 00"	1	C. Despres (FRA)	KTM	39h 15' 59"	+ 00' 00"
10	2	D. Frétigné (FRA)	Yamaha	3h 12' 49"	+ 02' 06"	2	P. A. Ullevålseter (NOR)	KTM	40h 38' 48"	+ 1h 22' 49"
10	3	H. Rodrigues (POR)	Yamaha	3h 13' 19"	+ 02' 36"	3	F. López (CHI)	Aprilia	40h 40' 06"	+ 1h 24' 07"
11	1	M. Coma (ESP)	KTM	2h 39' 13"	+ 00' 00"	1	C. Despres (FRA)	KTM	42h 05' 10"	+ 00' 00"
11	2	D. Frétigné (FRA)	Yamaha	2h 44' 26"	+ 05' 13"	2	F. López (CHI)	Aprilia	43h 26' 04"	+ 1h 20' 54"
11	3	F. Verhoeven (NLD)	BMW	2h 44' 50"	+ 05' 37"	3	P. A. Ullevålseter (NOR)	KTM	43h 26' 04"	+ 1h 20' 54"
12	1	F. López (CHI)	Aprilia	3h 48' 34"	+ 00' 00"	1	C. Despres (FRA)	KTM	46h 10' 56"	+ 00' 00"
12	2	D. Frétigné (FRA)	Yamaha	3h 49' 14"	+ 00' 40"	2	F. López (CHI)	Aprilia	47h 14' 38"	+ 1h 03' 42"
12	3	P. A. Ullevålseter (NOR)	KTM	3h 49' 47"	+ 01' 13"	3	P. A. Ullevålseter (NOR)	KTM	47h 15' 51"	+ 1h 04' 55"
13	1	P. A. Ullevålseter (NOR)	KTM	3h 27' 05"	+ 00' 00"	1	C. Despres (FRA)	KTM	49h 38' 44"	+ 00' 00"
13	2	C. Despres (FRA)	KTM	3h 27' 48"	+ 00' 43"	2	P. A. Ullevålseter (NOR)	KTM	50h 42' 56"	+ 1h 04' 12"
13	3	M. Coma (ESP)	KTM	3h 29' 51"	+ 02' 46"	3	F. López (CHI)	Aprilia	50h 47' 18"	+ 1h 08' 34"
14	1	R. Faria (POR)	KTM	1h 26' 48"	+ 00' 00"	1	C. Despres (FRA)	KTM	51h 10' 37"	+ 00' 00"
14	2	P. A. Ullevålseter (NOR)	KTM	1h 30' 33"	+ 03' 45"	2	P. A. Ullevålseter (NOR)	KTM	52h 13' 29"	+ 1h 02' 52"
14	3	H. Rodrigues (POR)	Yamaha	1h 30' 45"	+ 03' 57"	3	F. López (CHI)	Aprilia	52h 20' 25"	+ 1h 09' 48"

=== Quads ===
	Stage result					General classification				
Stage	Pos	Competitor	Make	Time	Difference	Pos	Competitor	Make	Time	Difference
1	1	M. Patronelli (ARG)	Yamaha	2h 10' 44"	+ 00' 00"	1	M. Patronelli (ARG)	Yamaha	2h 10' 44"	+ 00' 00"
1	2	J. Macháček (CZE)	Yamaha	2h 11' 23"	+ 00' 39"	2	J. Macháček (CZE)	Yamaha	2h 11' 23"	+ 00' 39"
1	3	A. Patronelli (ARG)	Yamaha	2h 13' 18"	+ 02' 34"	3	A. Patronelli (ARG)	Yamaha	2h 13' 18"	+ 02' 34"
2	1	H. Deltrieu (FRA)	Polaris	4h 18' 03"	+ 00' 00"	1	J. M. González (ESP)	Yamaha	6h 34' 31"	+ 00' 00"
2	2	J. M. González (ESP)	Yamaha	4h 20' 09"	+ 02' 06"	2	A. Patronelli (ARG)	Yamaha	6h 37' 08"	+ 02' 37"
2	3	A. Patronelli (ARG)	Yamaha	4h 23' 50"	+ 05' 47"	3	M. Plechatý (CZE)	Yamaha	6h 37' 20"	+ 02' 49"
3	1	S. Halpern (ARG)	Yamaha	4h 13' 24"	+ 00' 00"	1	M. Patronelli (ARG)	Yamaha	10h 53' 38"	+ 00' 00"
3	2	M. Patronelli (ARG)	Yamaha	4h 15' 32"	+ 02' 08"	2	A. Patronelli (ARG)	Yamaha	11h 02' 59"	+ 09' 21"
3	3	J. M. Santamarina (ARG)	Can-Am	4h 22' 44"	+ 09' 20"	3	S. Halpern (ARG)	Yamaha	11h 03' 50"	+ 10' 12"
4	1	A. Patronelli (ARG)	Yamaha	2h 13' 29"	+ 00' 00"	1	M. Patronelli (ARG)	Yamaha	13h 08' 13"	+ 00' 00"
4	2	M. Patronelli (ARG)	Yamaha	2h 14' 35"	+ 01' 06"	2	A. Patronelli (ARG)	Yamaha	13h 16' 28"	+ 08' 15"
4	3	M. Plechatý (CZE)	Yamaha	2h 14' 43"	+ 01' 14"	3	S. Halpern (ARG)	Yamaha	13h 35' 03"	+ 26' 50"
5	1	M. Patronelli (ARG)	Yamaha	7h 39' 49"	+ 00' 00"	1	M. Patronelli (ARG)	Yamaha	20h 48' 02"	+ 00' 00"
5	2	J. M. Santamarina (ARG)	Can-Am	8h 09' 30"	+ 29' 41"	2	J. M. Santamarina (ARG)	Can-Am	21h 48' 38"	+ 1h 00' 36"
5	3	J. M. González (ESP)	Yamaha	8h 12' 43"	+ 32' 54"	3	J. M. González (ESP)	Yamaha	21h 55' 15"	+ 1h 07' 13"
6	1	M. Patronelli (ARG)	Yamaha	5h 58' 50"	+ 00' 00"	1	M. Patronelli (ARG)	Yamaha	26h 46' 52"	+ 00' 00"
6	2	A. Patronelli (ARG)	Yamaha	6h 17' 00"	+ 18' 10"	2	J. M. Santamarina (ARG)	Can-Am	28h 12' 55"	+ 1h 26' 03"
6	3	J. M. Santamarina (ARG)	Can-Am	6h 24' 17"	+ 25' 27"	3	J. M. González (ESP)	Yamaha	28h 40' 43"	+ 1h 53' 51"
7	1	A. Patronelli (ARG)	Yamaha	8h 10' 22"	+ 00' 00"	1	M. Patronelli (ARG)	Yamaha	35h 00' 44"	+ 00' 00"
7	2	M. Patronelli (ARG)	Yamaha	8h 13' 52"	+ 03' 30"	2	A. Patronelli (ARG)	Yamaha	37h 23' 09"	+ 2h 22' 25"
7	3	R. Sonik (POL)	Yamaha	8h 40' 35"	+ 30' 13"	3	J. M. González (ESP)	Yamaha	38h 18' 10"	+ 3h 17' 26"
8	1	M. Patronelli (ARG)	Yamaha	7h 25' 38"	+ 00' 00"	1	M. Patronelli (ARG)	Yamaha	42h 26' 22"	+ 00' 00"
8	2	A. Patronelli (ARG)	Yamaha	7h 26' 34"	+ 00' 56"	2	A. Patronelli (ARG)	Yamaha	44h 49' 43"	+ 2h 23' 21"
8	3	C. Declerck (FRA)	Polaris	7h 28' 13"	+ 02' 35"	3	J. M. González (ESP)	Yamaha	45h 53' 51"	+ 3h 27' 29"
9	1	C. Declerck (FRA)	Polaris	2h 55' 30"	+ 00' 00"	1	M. Patronelli (ARG)	Yamaha	45h 23' 39"	+ 00' 00"
9	2	A. Patronelli (ARG)	Yamaha	2h 57' 03"	+ 01' 33"	2	A. Patronelli (ARG)	Yamaha	47h 46' 46"	+ 2h 23' 07"
9	3	M. Patronelli (ARG)	Yamaha	2h 57' 17"	+ 01' 47"	3	J. M. González (ESP)	Yamaha	49h 43' 42"	+ 4h 20' 03"
10	1	J. M. González (ESP)	Yamaha	3h 33' 16"	+ 00' 00"	1	M. Patronelli (ARG)	Yamaha	49h 03' 22"	+ 00' 00"
10	2	M. Patronelli (ARG)	Yamaha	3h 39' 43"	+ 06' 27"	2	A. Patronelli (ARG)	Yamaha	51h 27' 43"	+ 2h 24' 21"
10	3	S. Halpern (ARG)	Yamaha	3h 40' 24"	+ 07' 08"	3	J. M. González (ESP)	Yamaha	53h 16' 58"	+ 4h 13' 36"
11	1	S. Halpern (ARG)	Yamaha	3h 18' 33"	+ 00' 00"	1	M. Patronelli (ARG)	Yamaha	52h 27' 42"	+ 00' 00"
11	2	A. Patronelli (ARG)	Yamaha	3h 23' 04"	+ 04' 31"	2	A. Patronelli (ARG)	Yamaha	54h 50' 47"	+ 2h 23' 05"
11	3	M. Patronelli (ARG)	Yamaha	3h 24' 20"	+ 05' 47"	3	J. M. González (ESP)	Yamaha	56h 44' 28"	+ 4h 16' 46"
12	1	C. Declerck (FRA)	Polaris	4h 52' 22"	+ 00' 00"	1	M. Patronelli (ARG)	Yamaha	57h 26' 04"	+ 00' 00"
12	2	A. Patronelli (ARG)	Yamaha	4h 53' 51"	+ 01' 29"	2	A. Patronelli (ARG)	Yamaha	59h 44' 38"	+ 2h 18' 34"
12	3	M. Patronelli (ARG)	Yamaha	4h 58' 22"	+ 06' 00"	3	J. M. González (ESP)	Yamaha	62h 38' 29"	+ 5h 12' 25"
13	1	C. Declerck (FRA)	Polaris	4h 11' 32"	+ 00' 00"	1	M. Patronelli (ARG)	Yamaha	62h 13' 52"	+ 00' 00"
13	2	R. Sonik (POL)	Yamaha	4h 17' 28"	+ 05' 56"	2	A. Patronelli (ARG)	Yamaha	64h 37' 25"	+ 2h 23' 33"
13	3	S. Halpern (ARG)	Yamaha	4h 38' 46"	+ 27' 14"	3	J. M. González (ESP)	Yamaha	67h 22' 03"	+ 5h 08' 11"
14	1	R. Sonik (POL)	Yamaha	1h 45' 27"	+ 00' 00"	1	M. Patronelli (ARG)	Yamaha	64h 17' 44"	+ 00' 00"
14	2	C. Declerck (FRA)	Polaris	1h 49' 30"	+ 04' 03"	2	A. Patronelli (ARG)	Yamaha	66h 40' 43"	+ 2h 22' 59"
14	3	S. Halpern (ARG)	Yamaha	1h 53' 13"	+ 07' 46"	3	J. M. González (ESP)	Yamaha	69h 25' 15"	+ 5h 07' 31"

=== Cars ===
	Stage result					General classification				
Stage	Pos	Competitor	Make	Time	Difference	Pos	Competitor	Make	Time	Difference
1	1	N. Roma (ESP); M. Périn (FRA)	BMW	2h 11' 15"	+ 00' 00"	1	N. Roma (ESP); M. Périn (FRA)	BMW	2h 11' 15"	+ 00' 00"
1	2	C. Sainz (ESP); L. Cruz (ESP)	Volkswagen	2h 13' 22"	+ 02' 07"	2	C. Sainz (ESP); L. Cruz (ESP)	Volkswagen	2h 13' 22"	+ 02' 07"
1	3	S. Peterhansel (FRA); J-P. Cottret (FRA)	BMW	2h 14' 05"	+ 02' 50"	3	S. Peterhansel (FRA); J-P. Cottret (FRA)	BMW	2h 14' 05"	+ 02' 50"
2	1	N. Al-Attiyah (QAT); T. Gottschalk (GER)	Volkswagen	4h 01' 55"	+ 00' 00"	1	N. Al-Attiyah (QAT); T. Gottschalk (GER)	Volkswagen	6h 16' 39"	+ 00' 00"
2	2	G. Chicherit (FRA); T. Thörner (SWE)	BMW	4h 03' 03"	+ 01' 08"	2	C. Sainz (ESP); L. Cruz (ESP)	Volkswagen	6h 17' 58"	+ 01' 19"
2	3	M. Nevès (BRA); C. Maestrelli (BRA)	Volkswagen	4h 03' 56"	+ 02' 01"	3	S. Peterhansel (FRA); J-P. Cottret (FRA)	BMW	6h 19' 09"	+ 02' 30"
3	1	S. Peterhansel (FRA); J-P. Cottret (FRA)	BMW	2h 55' 19"	+ 00' 00"	1	S. Peterhansel (FRA); J-P. Cottret (FRA)	BMW	9h 14' 28"	+ 00' 00"
3	2	C. Sainz (ESP); L. Cruz (ESP)	Volkswagen	3h 01' 03"	+ 05' 44"	2	C. Sainz (ESP); L. Cruz (ESP)	Volkswagen	9h 19' 01"	+ 04' 33"
3	3	N. Al-Attiyah (QAT); T. Gottschalk (GER)	Volkswagen	3h 05' 20"	+ 10' 01"	3	N. Al-Attiyah (QAT); T. Gottschalk (GER)	Volkswagen	9h 21' 59"	+ 07' 31"
4	1	R. Gordon (USA); A. Grider (USA)	Hummer	1h 40' 21"	+ 00' 00"	1	S. Peterhansel (FRA); J-P. Cottret (FRA)	BMW	10h 54' 50"	+ 00' 00"
4	2	S. Peterhansel (FRA); J-P. Cottret (FRA)	BMW	1h 40' 22"	+ 00' 01"	2	C. Sainz (ESP); L. Cruz (ESP)	Volkswagen	11h 02' 26"	+ 07' 36"
4	3	N. Al-Attiyah (QAT); T. Gottschalk (GER)	Volkswagen	1h 42' 47"	+ 02' 26"	3	N. Al-Attiyah (QAT); T. Gottschalk (GER)	Volkswagen	11h 04' 46"	+ 09' 56"
5	1	M. Miller (USA); R. Pitchford (RSA)	Volkswagen	5h 06' 15"	+ 00' 00"	1	C. Sainz (ESP); L. Cruz (ESP)	Volkswagen	16h 10' 51"	+ 00' 00"
5	2	C. Sainz (ESP); L. Cruz (ESP)	Volkswagen	5h 08' 25"	+ 02' 10"	2	N. Al-Attiyah (QAT); T. Gottschalk (GER)	Volkswagen	16h 15' 28"	+ 04' 37"
5	3	N. Al-Attiyah (QAT); T. Gottschalk (GER)	Volkswagen	5h 10' 42"	+ 04' 27"	3	M. Miller (USA); R. Pitchford (RSA)	Volkswagen	16h 20' 30"	+ 09' 39"
6	1	S. Peterhansel (FRA); J-P. Cottret (FRA)	BMW	4h 23' 55"	+ 00' 00"	1	C. Sainz (ESP); L. Cruz (ESP)	Volkswagen	20h 35' 33"	+ 00' 00"
6	2	C. Sainz (ESP); L. Cruz (ESP)	Volkswagen	4h 24' 42"	+ 00' 47"	2	N. Al-Attiyah (QAT); T. Gottschalk (GER)	Volkswagen	20h 50' 57"	+ 15' 24"
6	3	M. Miller (USA); R. Pitchford (RSA)	Volkswagen	4h 32' 50"	+ 08' 55"	3	M. Miller (USA); R. Pitchford (RSA)	Volkswagen	20h 53' 20"	+ 17' 47"
7	1	N. Al-Attiyah (QAT); T. Gottschalk (GER)	Volkswagen	5h 41' 29"	+ 00' 00"	1	C. Sainz (ESP); L. Cruz (ESP)	Volkswagen	26h 21' 23"	+ 00' 00"
7	2	S. Peterhansel (FRA); J-P. Cottret (FRA)	BMW	5h 44' 58"	+ 03' 29"	2	N. Al-Attiyah (QAT); T. Gottschalk (GER)	Volkswagen	26h 32' 26"	+ 11' 03"
7	3	C. Sainz (ESP); L. Cruz (ESP)	Volkswagen	5h 45' 50"	+ 04' 21"	3	M. Miller (USA); R. Pitchford (RSA)	Volkswagen	26h 43' 29"	+ 22' 06"
8	1	S. Peterhansel (FRA); J-P. Cottret (FRA)	BMW	5h 06' 05"	+ 00' 00"	1	C. Sainz (ESP); L. Cruz (ESP)	Volkswagen	31h 28' 13"	+ 00' 00"
8	2	C. Sainz (ESP); L. Cruz (ESP)	Volkswagen	5h 06' 50"	+ 00' 45"	2	N. Al-Attiyah (QAT); T. Gottschalk (GER)	Volkswagen	31h 42' 48"	+ 14' 35"
8	3	M. Miller (USA); R. Pitchford (RSA)	Volkswagen	5h 07' 12"	+ 01' 07"	3	M. Miller (USA); R. Pitchford (RSA)	Volkswagen	31h 50' 41"	+ 22' 28"
9	1	N. Al-Attiyah (QAT); T. Gottschalk (GER)	Volkswagen	1h 59' 28"	+ 00' 00"	1	C. Sainz (ESP); L. Cruz (ESP)	Volkswagen	33h 33' 40"	+ 00' 00"
9	2	C. Sainz (ESP); L. Cruz (ESP)	Volkswagen	2h 05' 27"	+ 05' 59"	2	N. Al-Attiyah (QAT); T. Gottschalk (GER)	Volkswagen	33h 42' 16"	+ 08' 36"
9	3	G. de Villiers (RSA); D. Von Zitzewitz (GER)	Volkswagen	2h 07' 06"	+ 07' 38"	3	M. Miller (USA); R. Pitchford (RSA)	Volkswagen	34h 00' 57"	+ 27' 17"
10	1	C. Sainz (ESP); L. Cruz (ESP)	Volkswagen	3h 01' 05"	+ 00' 00"	1	C. Sainz (ESP); L. Cruz (ESP)	Volkswagen	36h 34' 45"	+ 00' 00"
10	2	S. Peterhansel (FRA); J-P. Cottret (FRA)	BMW	3h 01' 33"	+ 00' 28"	2	N. Al-Attiyah (QAT); T. Gottschalk (GER)	Volkswagen	36h 44' 51"	+ 10' 06"
10	3	M. Miller (USA); R. Pitchford (RSA)	Volkswagen	3h 02' 07"	+ 01' 02"	3	M. Miller (USA); R. Pitchford (RSA)	Volkswagen	37h 03' 04"	+ 28' 19"
11	1	G. Chicherit (FRA); T. Thörner (SWE)	BMW	2h 34' 51"	+ 00' 00"	1	C. Sainz (ESP); L. Cruz (ESP)	Volkswagen	39h 16' 55"	+ 00' 00"
11	2	O. Terranova (ARG); P. Maimon (FRA)	Mitsubishi	2h 35' 21"	+ 00' 30"	2	N. Al-Attiyah (QAT); T. Gottschalk (GER)	Volkswagen	39h 21' 23"	+ 04' 28"
11	3	G. de Villiers (RSA); D. Von Zitzewitz (GER)	Volkswagen	2h 35' 30"	+ 00' 39"	3	M. Miller (USA); R. Pitchford (RSA)	Volkswagen	39h 40' 45"	+ 23' 50"
12	1	C. Sainz (ESP); L. Cruz (ESP)	Volkswagen	3h 30' 29"	+ 00' 00"	1	C. Sainz (ESP); L. Cruz (ESP)	Volkswagen	42h 47' 24"	+ 00' 00"
12	2	N. Al-Attiyah (QAT); T. Gottschalk (GER)	Volkswagen	3h 31' 21"	+ 00' 52"	2	N. Al-Attiyah (QAT); T. Gottschalk (GER)	Volkswagen	42h 52' 44"	+ 05' 20"
12	3	M. Miller (USA); R. Pitchford (RSA)	Volkswagen	3h 34' 51"	+ 04' 22"	3	M. Miller (USA); R. Pitchford (RSA)	Volkswagen	43h 15' 36"	+ 28' 12"
13	1	S. Peterhansel (FRA); J-P. Cottret (FRA)	BMW	2h 58' 25"	+ 00' 00"	1	C. Sainz (ESP); L. Cruz (ESP)	Volkswagen	45h 49' 42"	+ 00' 00"
13	2	N. Al-Attiyah (QAT); T. Gottschalk (GER)	Volkswagen	2h 59' 46"	+ 01' 21"	2	N. Al-Attiyah (QAT); T. Gottschalk (GER)	Volkswagen	45h 52' 30"	+ 02' 48"
13	3	G. Chicherit (FRA); T. Thörner (SWE)	BMW	3h 02' 10"	+ 03' 45"	3	M. Miller (USA); R. Pitchford (RSA)	Volkswagen	46h 21' 30"	+ 31' 48"
14	1	N. Al-Attiyah (QAT); T. Gottschalk (GER)	Volkswagen	1h 19' 42"	+ 00' 00"	1	C. Sainz (ESP); L. Cruz (ESP)	Volkswagen	47h 10' 00"	+ 00' 00"
14	2	C. Sainz (ESP); L. Cruz (ESP)	Volkswagen	1h 20' 18"	+ 00' 36"	2	N. Al-Attiyah (QAT); T. Gottschalk (GER)	Volkswagen	47h 12' 12"	+ 02' 12"
14	3	G. Chicherit (FRA); T. Thörner (SWE)	BMW	1h 20' 25"	+ 00' 43"	3	M. Miller (USA); R. Pitchford (RSA)	Volkswagen	47h 42' 51"	+ 32' 51"

=== Trucks ===
	Stage result					General classification				
Stage	Pos	Competitor	Make	Time	Difference	Pos	Competitor	Make	Time	Difference
1	1	V. Chagin (RUS); S. Savostin (RUS); E. Nikolaev (RUS)	Kamaz	2h 35' 47"	+ 00' 00"	1	V. Chagin (RUS); S. Savostin (RUS); E. Nikolaev (RUS)	Kamaz	2h 35' 47"	+ 00' 00"
1	2	A. Loprais (CZE); M. Holáň (CZE); J. Miškolci (SVK)	Tatra	2h 36' 14"	+ 00' 27"	2	A. Loprais (CZE); M. Holáň (CZE); J. Miškolci (SVK)	Tatra	2h 36' 14"	+ 00' 27"
1	3	F. Kabirov (RUS); A. Belyaev (RUS); A. Mokeev (RUS)	Kamaz	2h 39' 47"	+ 04' 00"	3	F. Kabirov (RUS); A. Belyaev (RUS); A. Mokeev (RUS)	Kamaz	2h 39' 47"	+ 04' 00"
2	1	V. Chagin (RUS); S. Savostin (RUS); E. Nikolaev (RUS)	Kamaz	4h 35' 07"	+ 00' 00"	1	V. Chagin (RUS); S. Savostin (RUS); E. Nikolaev (RUS)	Kamaz	7h 10' 54"	+ 00' 00"
2	2	F. Kabirov (RUS); A. Belyaev (RUS); A. Mokeev (RUS)	Kamaz	4h 37' 54"	+ 02' 47"	2	F. Kabirov (RUS); A. Belyaev (RUS); A. Mokeev (RUS)	Kamaz	7h 17' 41"	+ 06' 47"
2	3	A. De Azevedo (BRA); M. Justo (BRA); J. Martinec (CZE)	Tatra	4h 50' 05"	+ 14' 58"	3	A. De Azevedo (BRA); M. Justo (BRA); J. Martinec (CZE)	Tatra	7h 37' 28"	+ 26' 34"
3	1	V. Chagin (RUS); S. Savostin (RUS); E. Nikolaev (RUS)	Kamaz	3h 26' 53"	+ 00' 00"	1	V. Chagin (RUS); S. Savostin (RUS); E. Nikolaev (RUS)	Kamaz	10h 37' 47"	+ 00' 00"
3	2	F. Kabirov (RUS); A. Belyaev (RUS); A. Mokeev (RUS)	Kamaz	3h 38' 49"	+ 11' 56"	2	F. Kabirov (RUS); A. Belyaev (RUS); A. Mokeev (RUS)	Kamaz	10h 56' 30"	+ 18' 43"
3	3	A. De Azevedo (BRA); M. Justo (BRA); J. Martinec (CZE)	Tatra	4h 04' 01"	+ 37' 08"	3	A. De Azevedo (BRA); M. Justo (BRA); J. Martinec (CZE)	Tatra	11h 41' 29"	+ 1h 03' 42"
4	1	V. Chagin (RUS); S. Savostin (RUS); E. Nikolaev (RUS)	Kamaz	1h 53' 36"	+ 00' 00"	1	V. Chagin (RUS); S. Savostin (RUS); E. Nikolaev (RUS)	Kamaz	12h 31' 23"	+ 00' 00"
4	2	F. Kabirov (RUS); A. Belyaev (RUS); A. Mokeev (RUS)	Kamaz	2h 01' 20"	+ 07' 44"	2	F. Kabirov (RUS); A. Belyaev (RUS); A. Mokeev (RUS)	Kamaz	12h 57' 50"	+ 26' 27"
4	3	I. Mardeev (RUS); V. Mizyukaev (RUS); A. Karginov (RUS)	Kamaz	2h 05' 26"	+ 11' 50"	3	M. van Vliet (NED); H. Vaanholt (NED); G. van Veenendaal (NED)	GINAF	14h 55' 56"	+ 2h 24' 33"
5	1	F. Kabirov (RUS); A. Belyaev (RUS); A. Mokeev (RUS)	Kamaz	5h 48' 50"	+ 00' 00"	1	V. Chagin (RUS); S. Savostin (RUS); E. Nikolaev (RUS)	Kamaz	18h 20' 32"	+ 00' 00"
5	2	V. Chagin (RUS); S. Savostin (RUS); E. Nikolaev (RUS)	Kamaz	5h 49' 09"	+ 00' 19"	2	F. Kabirov (RUS); A. Belyaev (RUS); A. Mokeev (RUS)	Kamaz	18h 46' 40"	+ 26' 08"
5	3	J. Adua (FRA); D. Rodewald (POL); M. Torrallardona (ESP)	Iveco	6h 26' 38"	+ 37' 48"	3	M. van Vliet (NED); H. Vaanholt (NED); G. van Veenendaal (NED)	GINAF	21h 27' 58"	+ 3h 07' 26"
6	1	V. Chagin (RUS); S. Savostin (RUS); E. Nikolaev (RUS)	Kamaz	4h 55' 22"	+ 00' 00"	1	V. Chagin (RUS); S. Savostin (RUS); E. Nikolaev (RUS)	Kamaz	23h 15' 54"	+ 00' 00"
6	2	F. Kabirov (RUS); A. Belyaev (RUS); A. Mokeev (RUS)	Kamaz	5h 07' 25"	+ 12' 03"	2	F. Kabirov (RUS); A. Belyaev (RUS); A. Mokeev (RUS)	Kamaz	23h 54' 05"	+ 38' 11"
6	3	I. Mardeev (RUS); V. Mizykuaev (RUS); A. Karginov (RUS)	Kamaz	5h 26' 29"	+ 31' 07"	3	M. van Vliet (NED); H. Vaanholt (NED); G. van Veenendaal (NED)	GINAF	27h 22' 34"	+ 4h 06' 40"
7	1	V. Chagin (RUS); S. Savostin (RUS); E. Nikolaev (RUS)	Kamaz	6h 50' 20"	+ 00' 00"	1	V. Chagin (RUS); S. Savostin (RUS); E. Nikolaev (RUS)	Kamaz	30h 06' 14"	+ 00' 00"
7	2	F. Kabirov (RUS); A. Belyaev (RUS); A. Mokeev (RUS)	Kamaz	7h 15' 55"	+ 25' 35"	2	F. Kabirov (RUS); A. Belyaev (RUS); A. Mokeev (RUS)	Kamaz	31h 10' 00"	+ 1h 03' 46"
7	3	M. Macík (CZE); J. Kalina (CZE); J. Bervic (CZE)	LIAZ	8h 29' 42"	+ 1h 39' 22"	3	M. van Vliet (NED); H. Vaanholt (NED); G. van Veenendaal (NED)	GINAF	35h 53' 14"	+ 5h 47' 00"
8	1	V. Chagin (RUS); S. Savostin (RUS); E. Nikolaev (RUS)	Kamaz	5h 41' 35"	+ 00' 00"	1	V. Chagin (RUS); S. Savostin (RUS); E. Nikolaev (RUS)	Kamaz	35h 47' 49"	+ 00' 00"
8	2	F. Kabirov (RUS); A. Belyaev (RUS); A. Mokeev (RUS)	Kamaz	5h 54' 01"	+ 12' 26"	2	F. Kabirov (RUS); A. Belyaev (RUS); A. Mokeev (RUS)	Kamaz	37h 04' 01"	+ 1h 16' 12"
8	3	I. Mardeev (RUS); V. Mizykuaev (RUS); A. Karginov (RUS)	Kamaz	6h 52' 07"	+ 1h 10' 32"	3	M. van Vliet (NED); H. Vaanholt (NED); G. van Veenendaal (NED)	GINAF	43h 03' 33"	+ 7h 15' 44"
9	1	F. Kabirov (RUS); A. Belyaev (RUS); A. Mokeev (RUS)	Kamaz	2h 32' 20"	+ 00' 00"	1	V. Chagin (RUS); S. Savostin (RUS); E. Nikolaev (RUS)	Kamaz	38h 24' 50"	+ 00' 00"
9	2	V. Chagin (RUS); S. Savostin (RUS); E. Nikolaev (RUS)	Kamaz	2h 37' 01"	+ 04' 41"	2	F. Kabirov (RUS); A. Belyaev (RUS); A. Mokeev (RUS)	Kamaz	39h 36' 21"	+ 1h 11' 31"
9	3	J. Adua (FRA); D. Rodewald (POL); M. Torrallardona (ESP)	Iveco	2h 47' 00"	+ 14' 40"	3	M. van Vliet (NED); H. Vaanholt (NED); G. van Veenendaal (NED)	GINAF	46h 46' 03"	+ 8h 21' 13"
10	1	V. Chagin (RUS); S. Savostin (RUS); E. Nikolaev (RUS)	Kamaz	3h 44' 23"	+ 00' 00"	1	V. Chagin (RUS); S. Savostin (RUS); E. Nikolaev (RUS)	Kamaz	42h 09' 13"	+ 00' 00"
10	2	F. Kabirov (RUS); A. Belyaev (RUS); A. Mokeev (RUS)	Kamaz	3h 45' 47"	+ 01' 24"	2	F. Kabirov (RUS); A. Belyaev (RUS); A. Mokeev (RUS)	Kamaz	43h 22' 08"	+ 1h 12' 55"
10	3	J. Adua (FRA); D. Rodewald (POL); M. Torrallardona (ESP)	Iveco	3h 46' 01"	+ 01' 38"	3	M. van Vliet (NED); H. Vaanholt (NED); G. van Veenendaal (NED)	GINAF	50h 45' 01"	+ 8h 35' 48"
11	1	F. Kabirov (RUS); A. Belyaev (RUS); A. Mokeev (RUS)	Kamaz	3h 02' 53"	+ 00' 00"	1	V. Chagin (RUS); S. Savostin (RUS); E. Nikolaev (RUS)	Kamaz	45h 12' 38"	+ 00' 00"
11	2	V. Chagin (RUS); S. Savostin (RUS); E. Nikolaev (RUS)	Kamaz	3h 03' 25"	+ 00' 32"	2	F. Kabirov (RUS); A. Belyaev (RUS); A. Mokeev (RUS)	Kamaz	46h 25' 01"	+ 1h 12' 23"
11	3	J. Adua (FRA); D. Rodewald (POL); M. Torrallardona (ESP)	Iveco	3h 07' 38"	+ 04' 45"	3	M. van Vliet (NED); H. Vaanholt (NED); G. van Veenendaal (NED)	GINAF	54h 33' 40"	+ 9h 21' 02"
12	1	V. Chagin (RUS); S. Savostin (RUS); E. Nikolaev (RUS)	Kamaz	4h 27' 14"	+ 00' 00"	1	V. Chagin (RUS); S. Savostin (RUS); E. Nikolaev (RUS)	Kamaz	49h 39' 52"	+ 00' 00"
12	2	F. Kabirov (RUS); A. Belyaev (RUS); A. Mokeev (RUS)	Kamaz	4h 28' 34"	+ 01' 20"	2	F. Kabirov (RUS); A. Belyaev (RUS); A. Mokeev (RUS)	Kamaz	50h 53' 35"	+ 1h 13' 43"
12	3	I. Mardeev (RUS); V. Mizykuaev (RUS); A. Karginov (RUS)	Kamaz	4h 46' 54"	+ 19' 40"	3	M. van Vliet (NED); H. Vaanholt (NED); G. van Veenendaal (NED)	GINAF	59h 55' 52"	+ 10h 16' 00"
13	1	F. Kabirov (RUS); A. Belyaev (RUS); A. Mokeev (RUS)	Kamaz	3h 38' 47"	+ 00' 00"	1	V. Chagin (RUS); S. Savostin (RUS); E. Nikolaev (RUS)	Kamaz	53h 20' 29"	+ 00' 00"
13	2	V. Chagin (RUS); S. Savostin (RUS); E. Nikolaev (RUS)	Kamaz	3h 40' 37"	+ 01' 50"	2	F. Kabirov (RUS); A. Belyaev (RUS); A. Mokeev (RUS)	Kamaz	54h 32' 22"	+ 1h 11' 53"
13	3	I. Mardeev (RUS); V. Mizykuaev (RUS); A. Karginov (RUS)	Kamaz	3h 57' 05"	+ 18' 18"	3	M. van Vliet (NED); H. Vaanholt (NED); G. van Veenendaal (NED)	GINAF	63h 57' 48"	+ 10h 37' 19"
14	1	I. Mardeev (RUS); V. Mizykuaev (RUS); A. Karginov (RUS)	Kamaz	1h 41' 36"	+ 00' 00"	1	V. Chagin (RUS); S. Savostin (RUS); E. Nikolaev (RUS)	Kamaz	55h 04' 47"	+ 00' 00"
14	2	W. van Ginkel (NED); R. de Rooij (NLD); W. Tijsterman (NLD)	GINAF	1h 43' 40"	+ 02' 04"	2	F. Kabirov (RUS); A. Belyaev (RUS); A. Mokeev (RUS)	Kamaz	56h 17' 55"	+ 1h 13' 08"
14	3	M. Macík (CZE); J. Kalina (CZE); J. Bervic (CZE)	LIAZ	1h 43' 56"	+ 02' 20"	3	M. van Vliet (NED); H. Vaanholt (NED); G. van Veenendaal (NED)	GINAF	65h 48' 07"	+ 10h 43' 20"

== Final overall standings ==
=== Motorcycles ===
Pos.	No.	Competitor	Make	Time	Difference
1	2	Cyril Despres (FRA)	KTM	51h 10' 37"	+ 00' 00"
2	4	Pål Anders Ullevålseter (NOR)	KTM	52h 13' 29"	+ 1h 02' 52"
3	9	Francisco López (CHI)	Aprilia	52h 20' 25"	+ 1h 09' 48"
4	5	Helder Rodrigues (POR)	Yamaha	52h 30' 10"	+ 1h 19' 33"
5	12	David Frétigné (FRA)	Yamaha	53h 06' 33"	+ 1h 55' 56"
6	14	Alain Duclos (FRA)	KTM	53h 09' 12"	+ 1h 58' 35"
7	24	Jonah Street (USA)	KTM	54h 00' 20"	+ 2h 49' 43"
8	11	Jakub Przygonski (POL)	KTM	54h 26' 36"	+ 3h 15' 59"
9	16	Olivier Pain (FRA)	Yamaha	54h 38' 57"	+ 3h 28' 20"
10	34	Juan Pedrero (ESP)	KTM	54h 44' 25"	+ 3h 33' 48"

=== Quads ===
Pos.	No.	Competitor	Make	Time	Difference
1	251	Marcos Patronelli (ARG)	Yamaha	64h 17' 44"	+ 00' 00"
2	277	Alejandro Patronelli (ARG)	Yamaha	66h 40' 43"	+ 2h 22' 59"
3	256	Juan Manuel González (ESP)	Yamaha	69h 25' 15"	+ 5h 07' 31"
4	258	Christophe Declerck (FRA)	Polaris	70h 04' 40"	+ 5h 46' 56"
5	252	Rafal Sonik (POL)	Yamaha	70h 08' 08"	+ 5h 50' 24"
6	255	Sebastian Halpern (ARG)	Yamaha	73h 25' 15"	+ 9h 07' 31"
7	254	Oldřich Bražina (CZE)	Polaris	80h 51' 25"	+ 16h 33' 41"
8	264	Brice Auert (FRA)	Can-Am	81h 10' 00"	+ 16h 52' 16"
9	260	Bernardo Rolando Graue (ARG)	Can-Am	81h 55' 04"	+ 17h 37' 20"
10	267	Daniel Mazzucco (ARG)	Can-Am	89h 36' 23"	+ 25h 18' 39"

=== Cars ===
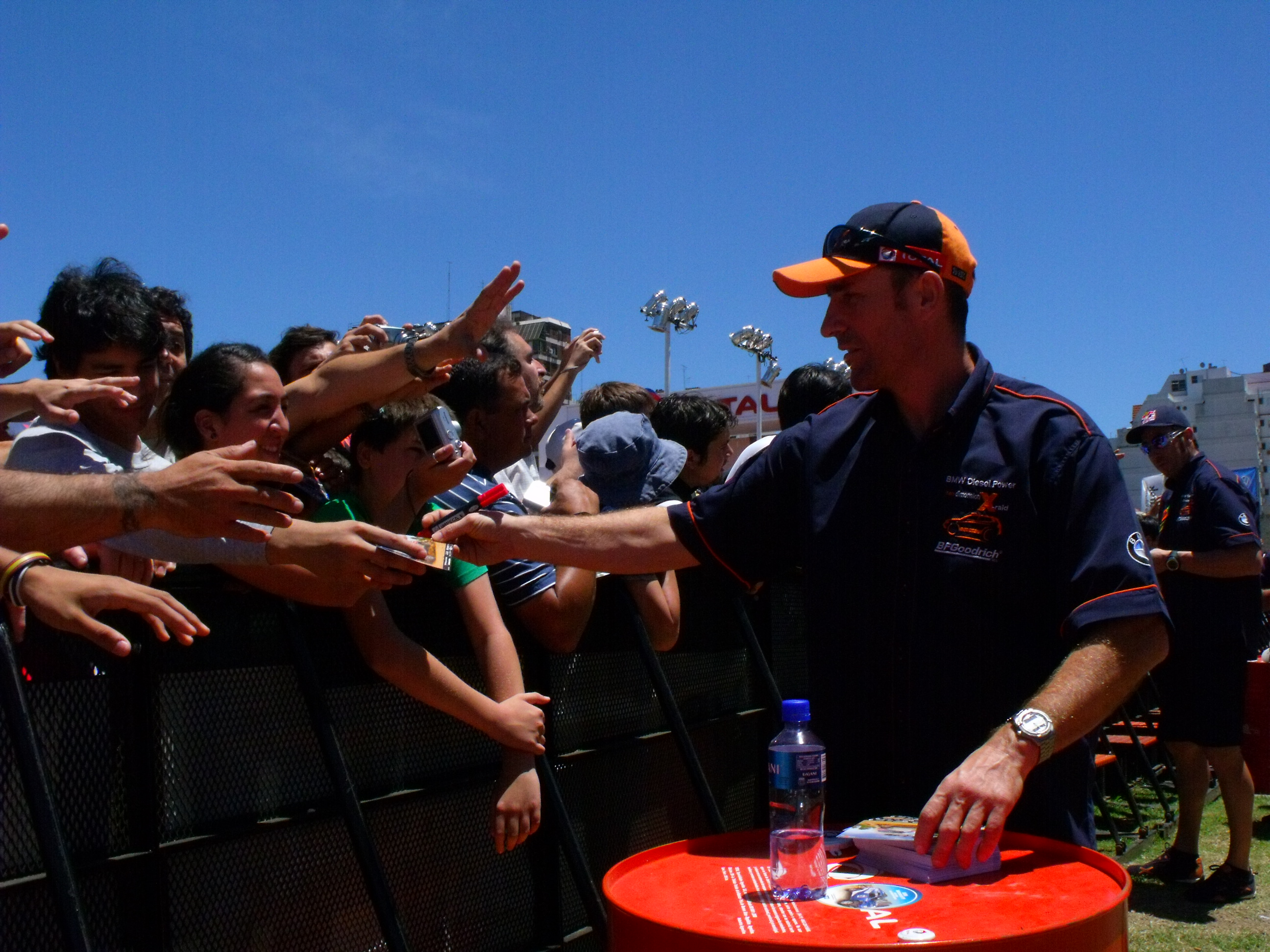
Nine-time winner Stéphane Peterhansel. Peterhansel finished as the highest non-Volkswagen driver, in fourth place.

Pos.	No.	Driver	Co-Driver	Make	Entrant	Time	Difference
1	303	Carlos Sainz (ESP)	Lucas Cruz (ESP)	Volkswagen	Volkswagen Motorsport	47h 10' 00"	+ 00' 00"
2	306	Nasser Al-Attiyah (QAT)	Timo Gottschalk (GER)	Volkswagen	Volkswagen Motorsport	47h 12' 12"	+ 02' 12"
3	305	Mark Miller (USA)	Ralph Pitchford (RSA)	Volkswagen	Volkswagen Motorsport	47h 42' 51"	+ 32' 51"
4	301	Stéphane Peterhansel (FRA)	Jean-Paul Cottret (FRA)	BMW	Team X-Raid	49h 27' 21"	+ 2h 17' 21"
5	307	Guerlain Chicherit (FRA)	Tina Thörner (SWE)	BMW	Team X-Raid	51h 12' 49"	+ 4h 02' 49"
6	314	Carlos Sousa (POR)	Matthieu Baumel (FRA)	Mitsubishi	Team JMB Stradale Off Road	51h 41' 45"	+ 4h 31' 45"
7	300	Giniel de Villiers (RSA)	Dirk von Zitzewitz (GER)	Volkswagen	Volkswagen Motorsport	52h 20' 19"	+ 5h 10' 19"
8	302	Robby Gordon (USA)	Andy Grider (USA)	Hummer	Robby Gordon Motorsports	53h 12' 24"	+ 6h 02' 24"
9	311	Orlando Terranova (ARG)	Pascal Maimon (FRA)	Mitsubishi	Team JMB Stradale Off Road	53h 14' 47"	+ 6h 04' 47"
10	322	Guilherme Spinelli (BRA)	Filipe Palmeiro (POR)	Mitsubishi	Team JMB Stradale Off Road	53h 23' 41"	+ 6h 13' 41"

=== Trucks ===
Pos.	No.	Driver	Navigator	Mechanic	Make	Time	Difference
1	501	Vladimir Chagin (RUS)	Sergey Savostin (RUS)	Eduard Nikolaev (RUS)	Kamaz	55h 04' 47"	+ 00' 00"
2	500	Firdaus Kabirov (RUS)	Aydar Belyaev (RUS)	Andrey Mokeev (RUS)	Kamaz	56h 17' 55"	+ 1h 13' 08"
3	508	Marcel van Vliet (NED)	Herman Vaanholt (NED)	Gerard van Veenendaal (NED)	GINAF	65h 48' 07"	+ 10h 43' 20"
4	506	Martin Macík (CZE)	Josef Kalina (CZE)	Jan Bervic (CZE)	LIAZ	67h 26' 08"	+ 12h 21' 21"
5	505	Ilgizar Mardeev (RUS)	Viatcheslav Mizyukaev (RUS)	Andrey Karginov (RUS)	Kamaz	70h 04' 16"	+ 14h 59' 29"
6	503	Wulfert van Ginkel (NED)	Richard de Rooij (NED)	Willem Tijsterman (NED)	GINAF	70h 34' 03"	+ 15h 29' 16"
7	514	Teruhito Sugawara (JPN)	Seiichi Suzuki (JPN)	none	Hino	72h 34' 24"	+ 17h 29' 37"
8	523	David Oliveras (AND)	Jesús Cámara Ordóñez (ESP)	Daniel Cámara Ordóñez (ESP)	Mercedes-Benz	78h 43' 53"	+ 23h 39' 06"
9	511	Jordi Juvanteny (ESP)	José Luis Criado (ESP)	Fina Román (ESP)	MAN	79h 20' 14"	+ 24h 15' 27"
10	518	Claudio Bellina (ITA)	Paolo Arici (ITA)	Giulio Minelli (ITA)	GINAF	81h 51' 59"	+ 26h 47' 12"

== Incidents ==
- During the first stage of the rally, 28-year-old Natalia Gallardo was killed after she and a group of spectators were involved in an incident with the Desert Warrior 4x4 of Mirco Schultis and Ulrich Leardi, which had veered off course near the town of Rio Cuarto, some 800 km (500 mi) from Buenos Aires. Four other fans were injured, two of which were transferred to Córdoba for further treatment.
- A vast number of competitors did not manage to return to the Fiambala bivouac by nightfall at the end of the third stage. Having to face the passage of the Andes on the fourth stage, the organisers decided to delay the start of the stage by 90 minutes, and shorten the stage by 40 km (25 mi).
- KTM rider Luca Manca was involved in a serious accident approximately 10 km (6.2 mi) into the sixth stage. He suffered a brain contusion in the accident, and was transferred by helicopter to Hospital del Cobre Dr. Salvador Allende Gossens in Calama, before being transferred to the neuro-surgical unit of Clínica de la Mutual de Seguridad in Santiago. This came a day after Manca had generously surrendered his rear wheel to defending champion Marc Coma when his fellow KTM rider's tyre burst.
- Stage nine was shortened by 168 km (104 mi) due to fog in the surrounding areas around the stage start at Copiapó.
