= Giniel de Villiers =

South African racing and rally driver (born 1972)

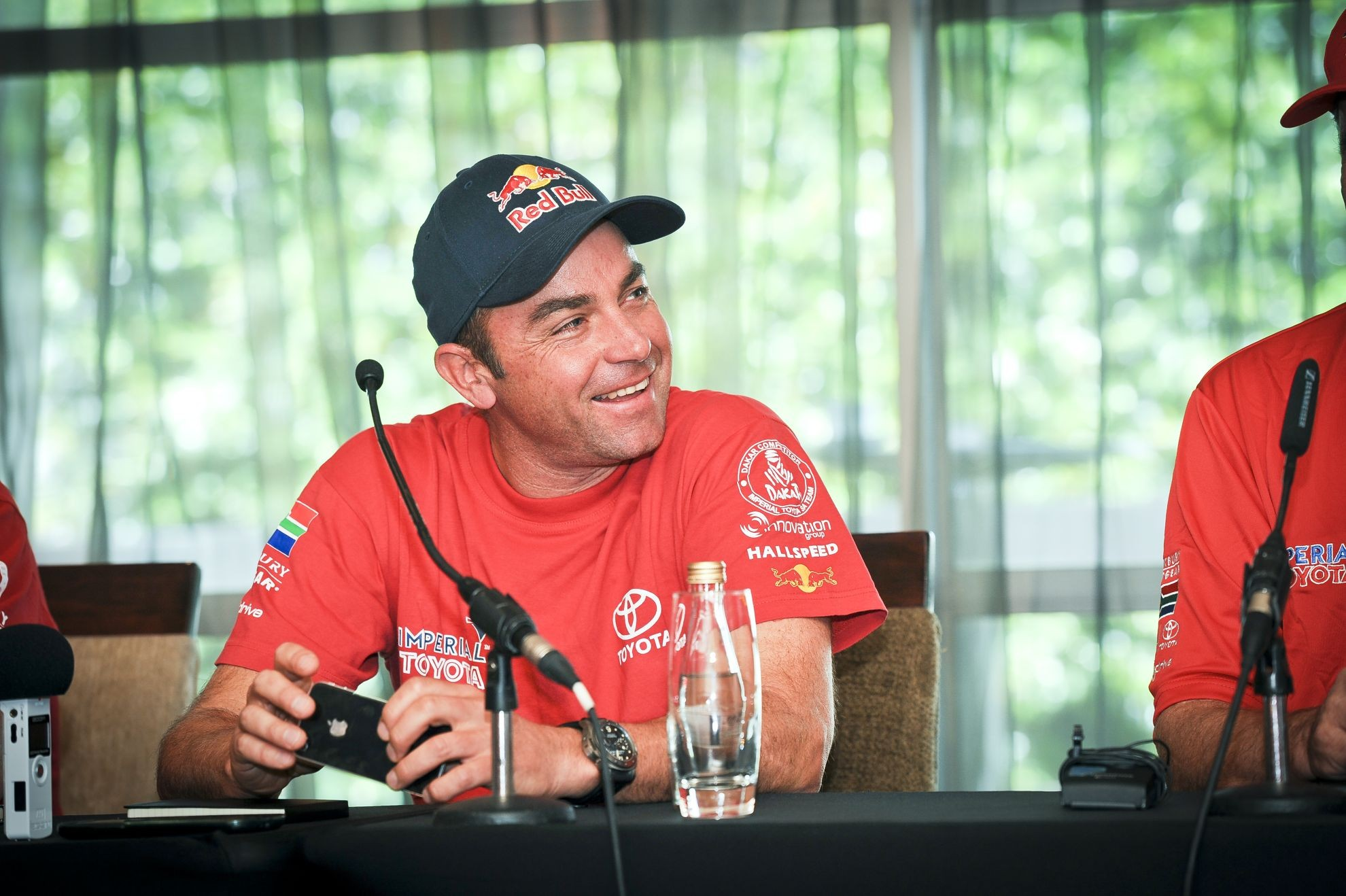
- Born: 25 March 1972 (age 54) Barrydale, South Africa

Dakar Rally career
- Debut season: 2003
- Current team: Toyota
- Co-driver: (South Africa) Dennis Murphy
- Starts: 16
- Championships: Dakar Rally
- Wins: 1
- Podiums: 8

Championship titles
- 2009: Dakar Rally

Giniel de Villiers (born 25 March 1972 in Barrydale, South Africa) is a South African racing and rally driver, best known for winning the 2009 Dakar Rally.

== Biography ==
De Villiers began his career in circuit racing, winning the domestic South African touring car championship four times in succession from 1997 to 2000 with a dealer-backed Nissan Primera. Switching to off-road racing thereafter, de Villiers made his Dakar Rally debut in 2003 driving for the works Nissan team. Finishing fifth overall at first attempt alongside navigator Pascal Maimon, de Villiers took his first stage victory in 2004 on the way to seventh overall in the standings (this time alongside François Jordaan) and won two stages in 2005, ending fourth overall (alongside Jean-Marie Lurquin).

De Villiers switched his allegiance to Volkswagen when Nissan withdrew their factory team at the end of 2005, taking another stage win and the runner-up position in the overall standings in 2006 along with navigator Tina Thorner – fifteen minutes behind Mitsubishi's Luc Alphand. Engine trouble prevented de Villiers and his new navigator Dirk von Zitzewitz finishing any higher than eleventh overall in 2007, in spite of four stage victories. In 2009, de Villiers and Zitzewitz took the overall victory, albeit largely as a result of their teammate Carlos Sainz retiring whilst in a commanding position. More engine trouble in 2010 prevented de Villiers and von Zitzewitz from being able to defend their crown, the pair finishing just seventh overall, but they were able to finish in a strong runner-up position to teammate Nasser Al-Attiyah in 2011 with another stage victory.

De Villiers and Zitzewitz joined the South African Imperial Toyota team for the 2012 and 2013 event as a result of Volkswagen's withdrawal. They finished in third position in 2012 and a credible second place overall in 2013 despite taking no stage victories. In 2014, de Villiers and Zitzewitz were the best non-Mini crew, winning the final stage of the rally to cement fourth place overall – de Villiers' eighth top-five finish in 11 Dakar starts.

De Villiers also took part in the 2009 Race of Champions, forming an 'All-Star' team alongside David Coulthard. The pair however failed to advance from the group stages of the Nations Cup competition, whilst de Villiers finished bottom of his group during the individual event.

The opportunity to compete in the local championship gave De Villiers the opportunity to return to a championship he won ten years ago. It also gave him significantly more seat time in the Toyota Gazoo Racing SA Hilux.

== Dakar Rally results ==
Year	Class	Vehicle	Position	Stages won
2003	Car	(Japan) Nissan	5th	0
2004	Car	(Japan) Nissan	7th	1
2005	Car	(Japan) Nissan	4th	2
2006	Car	(Germany) Volkswagen	2nd	1
2007	Car	(Germany) Volkswagen	11th	4
2008	Event cancelled – replaced by the 2008 Central Europe Rally			
2009	Car	(Germany) Volkswagen	1st	4
2010	Car	(Germany) Volkswagen	7th	0
2011	Car	(Germany) Volkswagen	2nd	1
2012	Car	(Japan) Toyota	3rd	0
2013	Car	(Japan) Toyota	2nd	0
2014	Car	(Japan) Toyota	4th	1
2015	Car	(Japan) Toyota	2nd	0
2016	Car	(Japan) Toyota	3rd	0
2017	Car	(Japan) Toyota	5th	0
2018	Car	(Japan) Toyota	3rd	1
2019	Car	(Japan) Toyota	9th	0
2020	Car	(Japan) Toyota	5th	1
2021	Car	(Japan) Toyota	8th	1
2022	Car	(Japan) Toyota	5th	1
2023	Car	(Japan) Toyota	4th	0
2024	Car	(Japan) Toyota	7th	0
2025	Car	(Japan) Toyota	DNF	0

Sporting positions
Preceded by Stéphane Peterhansel	Dakar Rally; Car Winner; 2009	Succeeded by Carlos Sainz
