= Ruben Faria =

Portuguese motorcycle sports rider

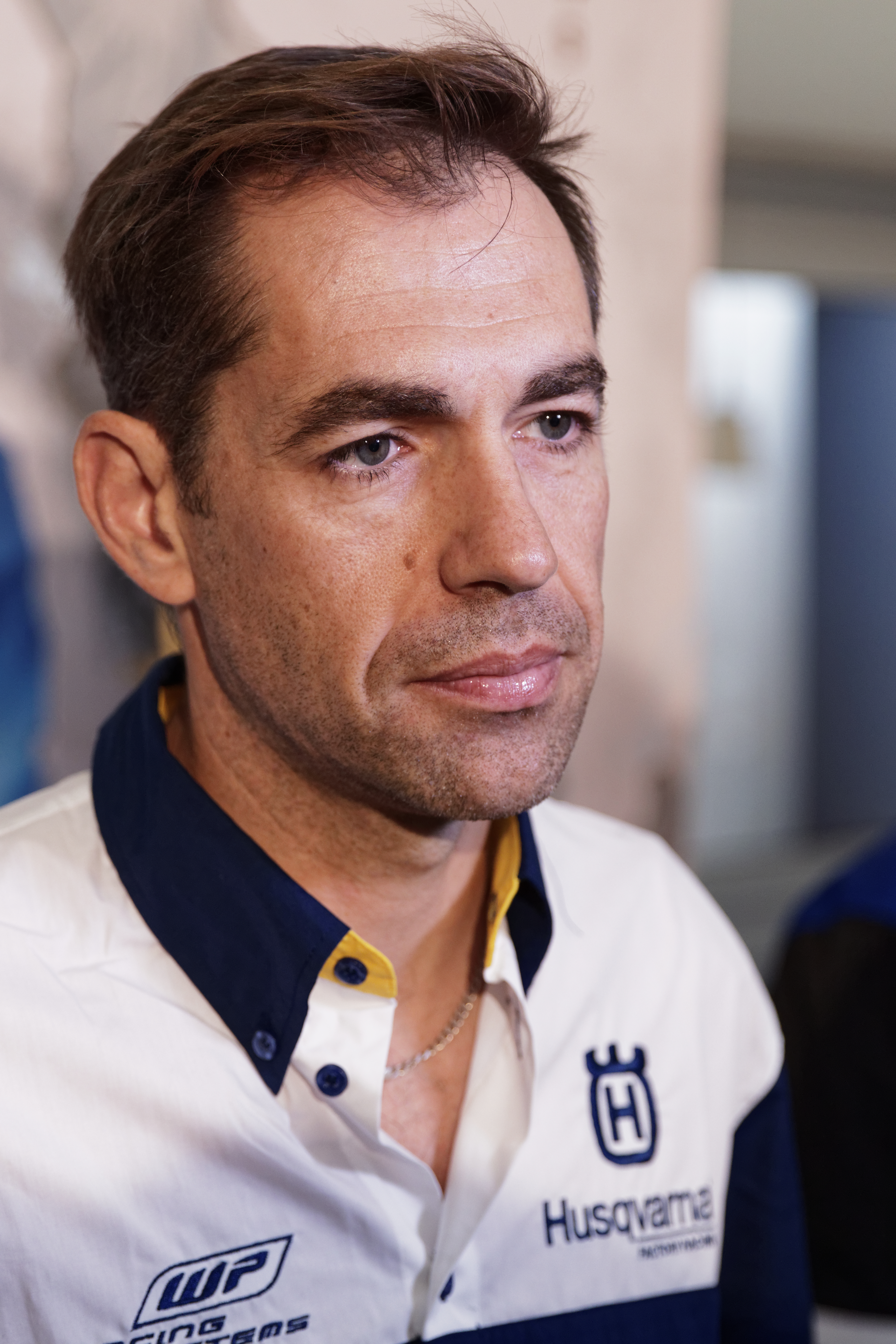
Faria in 2016

Ruben Faria (born 30 July 1974 in Olhão) is a Portuguese rally-raid and enduro motorcycle rider, best known for his participation in the Dakar Rally in which he finished as runner-up in 2013.

== Career ==
Faria made his Dakar Rally debut in 2006, winning only his second ever stage, set in the Portuguese city of Portimao, riding a KTM motorcycle. Despite this success, Faria could finish no higher than 35th overall by the end of the rally, and was forced to retire from the race in 2007 after the eighth stage having won the opening stage in Lisbon. His next participation would not come until 2010, his first appearance for the works KTM team as "water-carrier" (support rider) for teammate Cyril Despres, where Faria took another stage win in the final day of the rally to cement an 11th place finish in the final standings. He then took his first top-ten overall placing by finishing eighth in 2011, though he failed to win a stage for the first time, and finished 12th overall in 2012 in spite of sustaining a wrist injury on the third day of the rally.

Faria enjoyed his most successful run in the Dakar to date in 2013, finishing second to team leader Despres, 11 minutes down on the winning time, his win in the final stage bringing his total to four. Faria continued with KTM in 2014, no longer in a supporting role, but was forced to retire from the rally after three days having suffered a crash, after which he was transferred to hospital but found to be not seriously injured.

Outside of the Dakar, Faria has won other major rally-raid events such as the Moroccan Rally (in 2007) and the Portuguese-based PAX Rally (in 2008, part of the Dakar Series).

In 2016, Faria rode for KTM's sister company, Husqvarna, but crashed out of Stage 6, retiring from the race because of injuries, retiring from the sport shortly afterwards. In 2017, he was a consultant for the team, but will return to the race in 2018, following in the footsteps of Cyril Despres, Stéphane Peterhansel, and Nani Roma, all distinguished Dakar motorcycle racers who switched to cars later in their career, paired with Andre Villas-Boas in a Toyota Hilux in the car category.
