= 2006 Dakar Rally =

Off-road motorsport event in Europe and Africa

← Previous event	Next event →
- Lisboa - Dakar 2006 route.
- Host country: Portugal; Spain; Morocco / (Sahrawi Arab Democratic Republic) Western Sahara; Mali; Mauritania; Guinea; Senegal

Results
- Cars winner: (France) Luc Alphand (France) Gilles Picard; Mitsubishi
- Bikes winner: (Spain) Marc Coma; KTM
- Trucks winner: (Russia) Vladimir Chagin (Russia) Semen Yakubov (Russia) Sergey Savostin; Kamaz

The 2006 Dakar Rally, also known as the 2006 Paris-Dakar Rally, was the 28th running of the Dakar Rally event. The 2006 event ran from 31 December 2005 to 15 January 2006. It started from Lisbon, Portugal, and passed through Spain, Morocco, Western Sahara, Mali, Mauritania, Guinea, before finishing in Senegal. The format included speed restrictions on motorcycles and trucks and reduced use of global positioning systems. Competitors included double world rally champion, Carlos Sainz.

== Entries ==
Number of participants
Stage	Bikes	Cars	Trucks	Total
Start of Rally	232	174	69	475
Rest Day	131	115	51	297
End of Rally	93	67	33	193

=== Bikes ===
Leading Entries
Manufacturer	Team	No.	Rider
(Austria) KTM	Gauloises KTM France	1	(France) Cyril Despres
(Austria) KTM	Gauloises KTM France	3	(Spain) Isidre Esteve
(Austria) KTM	Gauloises KTM France	8	(France) David Casteu
(Austria) KTM	Gauloises KTM France	11	(France) Michel Gau
(Austria) KTM	KTM Repsol-Red Bull	2	(Spain) Marc Coma
(Austria) KTM	KTM Repsol-Red Bull	4	(Chile) Carlo de Gavardo
(Austria) KTM	KTM Repsol-Red Bull	6	(Italy) Giovanni Sala
(Austria) KTM	Team Scandinavia	5	(Norway) Pål Anders Ullevålseter
(Austria) KTM	Petrobras-Lubrax	7	(Brazil) Jean de Azevedo
(Austria) KTM	Red Bull KTM	9	(United States) Chris Blais
(Austria) KTM	Red Bull KTM	10	(Australia) Andy Caldecott (Note: Caldecott was a late replacement for the Spanish rider Jordi Durán.)
(Austria) KTM	Red Bull KTM	21	(Spain) Jordi Viladoms
(Austria) KTM	Red Bull KTM	23	(United States) Andy Grider
(Austria) KTM	KTM-Toni-Togo	14	(France) Alain Duclos
(Austria) KTM	Rally Pan America	42	(United States) Jonah Street
(Japan) Yamaha	Yamaha Motor France/Ipone	12	(France) David Frétigné
(Japan) Yamaha	Yamaha NL Dakar Team	15	(Netherlands) Frans Verhoeven
(Japan) Yamaha	Vodafone Banco Cetelem	55	(Portugal) Hélder Rodrigues

=== Cars ===
Leading Entries
Manufacturer	Team	No.	Driver	Co-Driver
(Japan) Mitsubishi	Mitsubishi Ralliart	300	(France) Stéphane Peterhansel	(France) Jean-Paul Cottret
(Japan) Mitsubishi	Mitsubishi Ralliart	302	(France) Luc Alphand	(France) Gilles Picard
(Japan) Mitsubishi	Mitsubishi Ralliart	304	(Spain) Nani Roma	(Andorra) Henri Magne
(Japan) Mitsubishi	Mitsubishi Ralliart	306	(Japan) Hiroshi Masuoka	(France) Pascal Maimon
(Germany) Volkswagen	Volkswagen Motorsport	301	(France) Bruno Saby	(France) Michel Périn
(Germany) Volkswagen	Volkswagen Motorsport	303	(Germany) Jutta Kleinschmidt	(Italy) Fabrizia Pons
(Germany) Volkswagen	Volkswagen Motorsport	305	(South Africa) Giniel de Villiers	(Sweden) Tina Thörner
(Germany) Volkswagen	Volkswagen Motorsport	307	(Spain) Carlos Sainz	(Germany) Andreas Schulz
(Germany) Volkswagen	Volkswagen Motorsport	309	(United States) Mark Miller	(Germany) Dirk von Zitzewitz
(Germany) BMW	X-Raid	308	(Qatar) Nasser Al-Attiyah	(France) Alain Guehennec
(Germany) BMW	X-Raid	312	(Spain) José Luis Monterde	(Italy) Tiziano Siviero
(Germany) BMW	X-Raid	313	(South Africa) Alfie Cox	(South Africa) Ralph Pitchford
(Germany) BMW	X-Raid	322	(France) Guerlain Chicherit	(France) Matthieu Baumel
(Japan) Nissan	Team Galp Energia	311	(Portugal) Carlos Sousa	(Belgium) Jean-Marie Lurquin
(Japan) Nissan	Nissan Dessoude	323	(Poland) Krzysztof Hołowczyc	(Belgium) Jean-Marc Fortin
(Japan) Nissan	Tecnosport-Italia	330	(Japan) Kenjiro Shinozuka	(Italy) Roberto di Persio
(France) Schlesser	Schlesser-Ford Raid	314	(France) Jean-Louis Schlesser	(France) François Borsotto
(France) Schlesser	Schlesser-Ford Raid	315	(France) Thierry Magnaldi	(France) Arnaud Debron
(France) Schlesser	Schlesser-Ford Raid	316	(Spain) José Maria Servia	(France) William Alcaraz
(France) SMG	SMG	317	(France) Philippe Gache	(France) Jean-Pierre Garcin
(France) SMG	SMG	345	(France) Henri Pescarolo	(France) Didier Le Gal
(United Kingdom) Bowler	Bowler Off Road Ltd	333	(Belgium) Freddy Loix	(Netherlands) Eric Verhoef
(United States) Hummer	Team Gordon	335	(United States) Robby Gordon	(United States) Darren Skilton

=== Trucks ===
Leading Entries
Manufacturer	Team	No.	Driver	Co-Drivers
(Russia) Kamaz	Kamaz-Master	500	(Russia) Firdaus Kabirov	(Russia) Aydar Belyaev (Russia) Andrey Mokeev
(Russia) Kamaz	Kamaz-Master	508	(Russia) Vladimir Chagin	(Russia) Semen Yakubov (Russia) Sergey Savostin
(Russia) Kamaz	Kamaz-Master	514	(Russia) Sergey Reshetnikov	(Russia) Stanislav Konopko (Russia) Eduard Nikolaev
(Japan) Hino	Sugawara	501	(Japan) Yoshimasa Sugawara	(Japan) Katsumi Hamura
(Japan) Hino	Sugawara	505	(Japan) Teruhito Sugawara	(Japan) Seiichi Suzuki
(Germany) Mercedes-Benz	Vismara Sport System	503	(Italy) Giacomo Vismara	(Italy) Mario Cambiaghi
(Italy) Iveco	Motorsport Italia	507	(Finland) Markku Alén	(Spain) Rafael Tornabell (Italy) Adriano Micozzi
(Italy) Iveco	Motorsport Italia	512	(Italy) Miki Biasion	(Italy) Giorgio Albiero (Italy) Livio Diamante
(Italy) Iveco	Motorsport Italia	519	(Spain) Pep Vila	(Spain) Moi Torrallardona (Spain) Gonzalo Azurmendi
(Czech Republic) Tatra	Loprais	509	(Czech Republic) Karel Loprais	(Czech Republic) Petr Gilar (Czech Republic) Aleš Loprais
(Czech Republic) Tatra	Petrobras-Lubrax	513	(Brazil) André de Azevedo	(Czech Republic) Jaromír Martinec (Brazil) Maykel Justo
(Germany) MAN	Exact-Man	524	(Netherlands) Hans Stacey	(Belgium) Charly Gotlib (Netherlands) Bernard der Kinderen
(Germany) MAN	Exact-Man	530	(Germany) Franz Echter	(Germany) Peter Gobel (Netherlands) Edwin van Dooren

== Stages ==
Rally stages map

Stage	Date	From	To	Total (km/mi)	Stage winners		
Stage	Date	From	To	Total (km/mi)	Bikes	Cars	Trucks
1	31 December	(Portugal) Lisbon	(Portugal) Portimão	370 kilometres (230 mi)	(France) C. Despres	(Spain) C. Sainz	(Russia) V. Chagin
2	1 January	(Portugal) Portimão	(Spain) Málaga	567 kilometres (352 mi)	(Portugal) R. Faria	(Spain) C. Sainz	(Russia) V. Chagin
3	2 January	(Morocco) Nador	(Morocco) Er Rachidia	672 kilometres (418 mi)	(Australia) A. Caldecott	(France) J-L. Schlesser	(Russia) V. Chagin
4	3 January	(Morocco) Er Rachidia	(Morocco) Ouarzazate	639 kilometres (397 mi)	(Spain) I. Esteve	(Spain) C. Sainz	(Russia) V. Chagin
5	4 January	(Morocco) Ouarzazate	(Morocco) Tan-Tan	819 kilometres (509 mi)	(France) C. Despres	(France) S. Peterhansel	(Russia) V. Chagin
6	5 January	(Morocco) Tan-Tan	(Mauritania) Zouérat	792 kilometres (492 mi)	(Chile) C. de Gavardo	(France) T. Magnaldi	(Russia) V. Chagin
7	6 January	(Mauritania) Zouérat	(Mauritania) Atar	521 kilometres (324 mi)	(Chile) C. de Gavardo	(France) S. Peterhansel	(Netherlands) H. Stacey
8	7 January	(Mauritania) Atar	(Mauritania) Nouakchott	568 kilometres (353 mi)	(France) D. Casteu	(France) T. Magnaldi	(Russia) F. Kabirov
	8 January	(Mauritania) Nouakchott		Rest day			
9	9 January	(Mauritania) Nouakchott	(Mauritania) Kiffa	874 kilometres (543 mi)	(France) C. Despres	(France) S. Peterhansel	(Russia) V. Chagin
10	10 January	(Mauritania) Kiffa	(Mali) Kayes	333 kilometres (207 mi)	Stage cancelled^{1}	(Spain) C. Sainz	(Netherlands) H. Stacey
11	11 January	(Mali) Kayes	(Mali) Bamako	705 kilometres (438 mi)	(France) A. Duclos	(South Africa) G. de Villiers	(Netherlands) H. Stacey
12	12 January	(Mali) Bamako	(Guinea) Labé	872 kilometres (542 mi)	(France) C. Despres	(France) L. Alphand	(Netherlands) H. Stacey
13	13 January	(Guinea) Labé	(Senegal) Tambacounda	567 kilometres (352 mi)	(Italy) G. Sala	(France) L. Alphand	(Netherlands) H. Stacey
14	14 January	(Senegal) Tambacounda	(Senegal) Dakar	634 kilometres (394 mi)	(France) D. Frétigné	(France) G. Chicherit	(Russia) F. Kabirov
15	15 January	(Senegal) Dakar		110 kilometres (68 mi)	Non-timed		

Notes:

- ^1 — Stage cancelled for bikes only in tribute to Andy Caldecott, who died during the previous stage.

== Motorcycles ==
Australian motorcyclist Andy Caldecott died in an accident during ninth stage. The tenth stage was not timed as a mark of respect for Caldecott. Spanish rider Marc Coma on KTM won the motorcycle category, second was French rider Cyril Despres and third Italian rider Giovanni Sala (both on KTM).

	Stage result					General classification				
Stage	Pos	Competitor	Make	Time	Gap	Pos	Competitor	Make	Time	Gap
1	1	(France) Cyril Despres	KTM	56:20		1	(France) Cyril Despres	KTM	56:20	
1	2	(Portugal) Ruben Faria	KTM	58:14	0:04	2	(Portugal) Ruben Faria	KTM	58:14	0:04
1	3	(Spain) Marc Coma	KTM	58:17	0:07	3	(Spain) Marc Coma	KTM	58:17	0:07
2	1	(Portugal) Ruben Faria^{1}	KTM	1:37:07		1	(Spain) Isidre Esteve	KTM	2:37:24	
2	2	(Spain) Isidre Esteve	KTM	1:38:14	1:07	2	(Spain) Marc Coma	KTM	2:37:32	0:08
2	3	(France) David Casteu	KTM	1:38:35	1:28	3	(Portugal) Hélder Rodrigues	Yamaha	2:38:32	0:43
3	1	(Australia) Andy Caldecott	KTM	3:21:11		1	(France) Cyril Despres	KTM	6:03:12	
3	2	(United States) Andy Grider	KTM	3:24:15	3:04	2	(Spain) Marc Coma	KTM	6:04:28	1:16
3	3	(France) Cyril Despres	KTM	3:24:17	3:06	3	(Spain) Jose Manuel Pellicer	KTM	6:04:52	1:39
4	1	(Spain) Isidre Esteve	KTM	4:13:01		1	(Spain) Marc Coma	KTM	10:17:57	
4	2	(Spain) Marc Coma	KTM	4:13:29	0:28	2	(Spain) Isidre Esteve	KTM	10:22:48	4:51
4	3	(Chile) Carlo de Gavardo	KTM	4:18:16	5:15	3	(France) Cyril Despres	KTM	10:23:03	5:06
5	1	(France) Cyril Despres	KTM	3:47:40		1	(Spain) Marc Coma	KTM	14:09:18	
5	2	(Spain) Marc Coma	KTM	3:51:21	3:41	2	(France) Cyril Despres	KTM	14:10:43	1:25
5	3	(Spain) Isidre Esteve	KTM	3:52:58	5:18	3	(Spain) Isidre Esteve	KTM	14:15:46	6:28
6	1	(Chile) Carlo de Gavardo	KTM	4:00:32		1	(Spain) Marc Coma	KTM	18:15:45	
6	2	(Italy) Giovanni Sala	KTM	4:03:55	3:23	2	(France) Cyril Despres	KTM	18:19:28	3:43
6	3	(Spain) Isidre Esteve	KTM	4:01:24	3:52	3	(Spain) Isidre Esteve	KTM	18:20:10	4:25
7	1	(Chile) Carlo de Gavardo	KTM	6:28:11		1	(Spain) Marc Coma	KTM	24:45:23	
7	2	(Spain) Marc Coma	KTM	6:29:38	1:27	2	(Chile) Carlo de Gavardo	KTM	24:49:53	4:30
7	3	(Italy) Giovanni Sala	KTM	6:30:11	2:00	3	(Spain) Isidre Esteve	KTM	24:52:50	7:27
8	1	(France) David Casteu	KTM	5:55:55		1	(Spain) Marc Coma	KTM	30:49:20	
8	2	(United States) Chris Blais	KTM	5:55:08	2:13	2	(Spain) Isidre Esteve	KTM	30:55:43	6:23
8	3	(France) Cyril Despres	KTM	5:58:12	2:17	3	(Chile) Carlo de Gavardo	KTM	31:01:09	11:49
9	1	(France) Cyril Despres	KTM	7:55:48		1	(Spain) Marc Coma	KTM	38:49:15	
9	2	(Spain) Marc Coma	KTM	7:59:55	4:07	2	(France) Cyril Despres	KTM	39:12:02	22:47
9	3	(Portugal) Hélder Rodrigues	Yamaha	8:02:48	7:00	3	(Italy) Giovanni Sala	KTM	39:42:19	53:04
10	Stage cancelled due to death of Andy Caldecott									
11	1	(France) Alain Duclos	KTM	3:16:40		1	(Spain) Marc Coma	KTM	42:07:22	
11	2	(Spain) Marc Coma	KTM	3:18:07	1:27	2	(France) Cyril Despres	KTM	42:41:46	34:24
11	3	(United States) Jonah Street	KTM	3:23:19	6:39	3	(Italy) Giovanni Sala	KTM	43:14:23	1:07:01
12	1	(France) Cyril Despres	KTM	4:52:14		1	(Spain) Marc Coma	KTM	47:01:21	
12	2	(Spain) Marc Coma	KTM	4:53:49	1:45	2	(France) Cyril Despres	KTM	47:34:00	32:39
12	3	(United States) Chris Blais	KTM	4:54:43	2:29	3	(Italy) Giovanni Sala	KTM	48:46:36	1:45:15
13	1	(Italy) Giovanni Sala	KTM	5:03:49		1	(Spain) Marc Coma	KTM	52:09:45	
13	2	(France) Cyril Despres	KTM	5:07:01	3:12	2	(France) Cyril Despres	KTM	52:41:01	31:16
13	3	(France) Alain Duclos	KTM	5:07:21	3:32	3	(Italy) Giovanni Sala	KTM	53:50:25	1:40:40
14	1	(France) David Frétigné	Yamaha	3:16:59		1	(Spain) Marc Coma	KTM	55:27:17	
14	2	(Spain) Marc Coma	KTM	3:17:32	0:33	2	(France) Cyril Despres	KTM	56:40:46	1:13:29
14	3	(Spain) Gerard Farrés	Yamaha	3:33:58	16:59	3	(Italy) Giovanni Sala	KTM	57:57:05	2:29:48
15	Stage not timed									

Notes:

- ^1 — Ruben Faria was awarded a 12-minute penalty for failing to complete the opening stage (including liaison) within the time limit, denying him the lead of the overall classification.

== Cars ==
Sainz riding VW Race Touareg won the first stage from Lisbon to Portimão, and also the second stage. Jean-Louis Schlesser, winner of the event in 1999 and 2000, riding Schlesser-Ford Buggy, won the third stage between Nador to Er Rachidia in Morocco, with Nani Roma on Mitsubishi Pajero Evo taking the overall lead. Sainz won the fourth stage and took the overall lead. Stephane Peterhansel, winner in 2004 and 2005, won the fifth stage while Sainz held on to the overall lead. Giniel de Villiers moved into the lead, 22 seconds ahead of Sainz, after the sixth stage from Tan Tan to Zouerat, which was won by Thierry Magnaldi. Stephane Peterhansel won the seventh stage between Zouerat and Atar in Mauritania but Luc Alphand, who took second place, moved into the overall lead. Stephane Peterhansel moved into the lead after finishing third in the eighth stage, which was won by Thierry Magnaldi.

Peterhansel won the ninth stage between Nouakchott and Kiffa in Mauritania to extend his lead; however, his win was overshadowed by the death of Australian motorcyclist Andy Caldecott in an accident. The tenth stage was won by Sainz with overall leader Stephane Peterhansel third. Peterhansel's overall lead was reduced after he finished 11th in the eleventh stage behind winner Giniel de Villiers. Peterhansel lost time after hitting a tree during a duststorm in the twelfth stage, which was won by Luc Alphand who took the overall lead. Alphand also won the thirteenth stage between Guinea and Senegal, which was marred by the death of a 10-year-old boy who was hit by a car as he crossed the road. He retained the overall lead after the fourteenth stage, which was won by Guerlain Chicherit; a second child was killed after reportedly being hit by a support lorry. The final stage was not timed as a mark of respect for the three deaths. The rally was won by Luc Alphand.

	Stage result					General classification				
Stage	Pos	Competitor	Make	Time	Gap	Pos	Competitor	Make	Time	Gap
1	1	(Spain) Carlos Sainz (Germany) Andreas Schulz	Volkswagen	56:20		1	(Spain) Carlos Sainz (Germany) Andreas Schulz	Volkswagen	56:20	
1	2	(Portugal) Carlos Sousa (Belgium) Jean-Marie Lurquin	Nissan	57:50	1:30	2	(Portugal) Carlos Sousa (Belgium) Jean-Marie Lurquin	Nissan	57:50	1:30
1	3	(France) Bruno Saby (France) Michel Périn	Volkswagen	58:11	1:51	3	(France) Bruno Saby (France) Michel Périn	Volkswagen	58:11	1:51
2	1	(Spain) Carlos Sainz (Germany) Andreas Schulz	Volkswagen	1:34:28		1	(Spain) Carlos Sainz (Germany) Andreas Schulz	Volkswagen	2:30:48	
2	2	(France) Luc Alphand (France) Gilles Picard	Mitsubishi	1:34:53	0:25	2	(France) Luc Alphand (France) Gilles Picard	Mitsubishi	2:34:33	3:45
2	3	(Qatar) Nasser Al-Attiyah (France) Alain Guehennec	BMW	1:34:56	0:28	3	(Spain) Nani Roma (Andorra) Henri Magne	Mitsubishi	2:35:02	4:14
3	1	(France) Jean-Louis Schlesser (France) François Borsotto	Schlesser-Ford	2:50:58		1	(Spain) Nani Roma (Andorra) Henri Magne	Mitsubishi	5:27:34	
3	2	(Japan) Hiroshi Masuoka (France) Pascal Maimon	Mitsubishi	2:51:17	0:19	2	(Japan) Hiroshi Masuoka (France) Pascal Maimon	Mitsubishi	5:27:40	0:06
3	3	(France) Stéphane Peterhansel (France) Jean-Paul Cottret	Mitsubishi	2:51:35	0:37	3	(France) Bruno Saby (France) Michel Périn	Volkswagen	5:28:28	0:54
4	1	(Spain) Carlos Sainz (Germany) Andreas Schulz	Volkswagen	3:52:48		1	(Spain) Carlos Sainz (Germany) Andreas Schulz	Volkswagen	9:21:18	
4	2	(France) Thierry Magnaldi (France) Arnaud Debron	Schlesser-Ford	3:54:48	2:00	2	(France) Bruno Saby (France) Michel Périn	Volkswagen	9:26:09	4:51
4	3	(France) Luc Alphand (France) Gilles Picard	Mitsubishi	3:55:58	3:10	3	(Germany) Jutta Kleinschmidt (Italy) Fabrizia Pons	Volkswagen	9:26:27	5:09
5	1	(France) Stéphane Peterhansel (France) Jean-Paul Cottret	Mitsubishi	3:34:40		1	(Spain) Carlos Sainz (Germany) Andreas Schulz	Volkswagen	13:04:57	
5	2	(United States) Mark Miller (Germany) Dirk von Zitzewitz	Volkswagen	3:35:52	1:12	2	(Germany) Jutta Kleinschmidt (Italy) Fabrizia Pons	Volkswagen	13:06:25	1:28
5	3	(Spain) Nani Roma (Andorra) Henri Magne	Mitsubishi	3:37:00	2:20	3	(France) Luc Alphand (France) Gilles Picard	Mitsubishi	13:07:04	2:07
6	1	(France) Thierry Magnaldi (France) Arnaud Debron	Schlesser-Ford	3:22:54		1	(South Africa) Giniel de Villiers (Sweden) Tina Thörner	Volkswagen	16:33:58	
6	2	(France) Jean-Louis Schlesser (France) François Borsotto	Schlesser-Ford	3:25:49	2:55	2	(Spain) Carlos Sainz (Germany) Andreas Schulz	Volkswagen	16:34:20	0:22
6	3	(South Africa) Giniel de Villiers (Sweden) Tina Thörner	Volkswagen	3:26:40	3:46	3	(Germany) Jutta Kleinschmidt (Italy) Fabrizia Pons	Volkswagen	16:34:32	0:34
7	1	(France) Stéphane Peterhansel (France) Jean-Paul Cottret	Mitsubishi	5:52:18		1	(France) Luc Alphand (France) Gilles Picard	Mitsubishi	22:32:41	
7	2	(France) Luc Alphand (France) Gilles Picard	Mitsubishi	5:56:41	4:23	2	(France) Stéphane Peterhansel (France) Jean-Paul Cottret	Mitsubishi	22:35:53	3:12
7	3	(Germany) Jutta Kleinschmidt (Italy) Fabrizia Pons	Volkswagen	6:02:07	11:49	3	(Germany) Jutta Kleinschmidt (Italy) Fabrizia Pons	Volkswagen	22:38:39	5:58
8	1	(France) Thierry Magnaldi (France) Arnaud Debron	Schlesser-Ford	5:00:56		1	(France) Stéphane Peterhansel (France) Jean-Paul Cottret	Mitsubishi	27:43:41	
8	2	(United States) Mark Miller (Germany) Dirk von Zitzewitz	Volkswagen	5:07:48	6:52	2	(France) Luc Alphand (France) Gilles Picard	Mitsubishi	27:44:13	0:32
8	3	(France) Stéphane Peterhansel (France) Jean-Paul Cottret	Mitsubishi	5:07:48	6:52	3	(South Africa) Giniel de Villiers (Sweden) Tina Thörner	Volkswagen	28:09:57	26:16
9	1	(France) Stéphane Peterhansel (France) Jean-Paul Cottret	Mitsubishi	6:52:45		1	(France) Stéphane Peterhansel (France) Jean-Paul Cottret	Mitsubishi	34:36:26	
9	2	(France) Luc Alphand (France) Gilles Picard	Mitsubishi	7:01:29	8:44	2	(France) Luc Alphand (France) Gilles Picard	Mitsubishi	34:45:42	9:16
9	3	(South Africa) Giniel de Villiers (Sweden) Tina Thörner	Volkswagen	7:20:45	28:00	3	(South Africa) Giniel de Villiers (Sweden) Tina Thörner	Volkswagen	35:30:42	54:16
10	1	(Spain) Carlos Sainz (Germany) Andreas Schulz	Volkswagen	3:28:34		1	(France) Stéphane Peterhansel (France) Jean-Paul Cottret	Mitsubishi	38:09:58	
10	2	(Spain) Nani Roma (Andorra) Henri Magne	Mitsubishi	3:32:42	4:08	2	(France) Luc Alphand (France) Gilles Picard	Mitsubishi	38:50:02	40:04
10	3	(France) Stéphane Peterhansel (France) Jean-Paul Cottret	Mitsubishi	3:33:32	4:58	3	(South Africa) Giniel de Villiers (Sweden) Tina Thörner	Volkswagen	39:13:15	1:03:17
11	1	(South Africa) Giniel de Villiers (Sweden) Tina Thörner	Volkswagen	3:07:01		1	(France) Stéphane Peterhansel (France) Jean-Paul Cottret	Mitsubishi	41:37:57	
11	2	(France) Bruno Saby (France) Michel Périn	Volkswagen	3:12:34	5:33	2	(France) Luc Alphand (France) Gilles Picard	Mitsubishi	42:03:06	25:09
11	3	(France) Luc Alphand (France) Gilles Picard	Mitsubishi	3:13:04	6:03	3	(South Africa) Giniel de Villiers (Sweden) Tina Thörner	Volkswagen	42:20:16	42:19
12	1	(France) Luc Alphand (France) Gilles Picard	Mitsubishi	4:22:46		1	(France) Luc Alphand (France) Gilles Picard	Mitsubishi	46:25:52	
12	2	(France) Guerlain Chicherit (France) Mathieu Baumel	BMW	4:23:42	0:56	2	(South Africa) Giniel de Villiers (Sweden) Tina Thörner	Volkswagen	46:46:23	20:31
12	3	(South Africa) Giniel de Villiers (Sweden) Tina Thörner	Volkswagen	4:26:07	3:21	3	(Spain) Nani Roma (Andorra) Henri Magne	Mitsubishi	47:46:38	1:20:46
13	1	(France) Luc Alphand (France) Gilles Picard	Mitsubishi	4:30:15		1	(France) Luc Alphand (France) Gilles Picard	Mitsubishi	50:56:07	
13	2	(Spain) Carlos Sainz (Germany) Andreas Schulz	Volkswagen	4:31:05	0:50	2	(South Africa) Giniel de Villiers (Sweden) Tina Thörner	Volkswagen	51:18:20	22:13
13	3	(South Africa) Giniel de Villiers (Sweden) Tina Thörner	Volkswagen	4:31:57	1:42	3	(Spain) Nani Roma (Andorra) Henri Magne	Mitsubishi	52:28:38	1:32:31
14	1	(France) Guerlain Chicherit (France) Mathieu Baumel	BMW	2:36:33		1	(France) Luc Alphand (France) Gilles Picard	Mitsubishi	53:47:32	
14	2	(South Africa) Alfie Cox (South Africa) Ralph Pitchford	BMW	2:39:46	3:13	2	(South Africa) Giniel de Villiers (Sweden) Tina Thörner	Volkswagen	54:05:25	17:53
14	3	(United States) Mark Miller (Germany) Dirk von Zitzewitz	Volkswagen	2:41:40	5:07	3	(Spain) Nani Roma (Andorra) Henri Magne	Mitsubishi	55:38:10	1:50:38
15	Stage not timed									

== Trucks ==
Vladimir Chagin riding Kamaz won the truck category, second was Hans Stacey on MAN, and third was Firdaus Kabirov on Kamaz.

	Stage result					General classification				
Stage	Pos	Competitor	Make	Time	Gap	Pos	Competitor	Make	Time	Gap
1	1	(Russia) Vladimir Chagin (Russia) Semen Yakubov (Russia) Sergey Savostin	Kamaz	1:12:59		1	(Russia) Vladimir Chagin (Russia) Semen Yabukov (Russia) Sergey Savostin	Kamaz	1:12:59	
1	2	(Italy) Miki Biasion (Italy) Giorgio Albiero (Italy) Livio Diamante	Iveco	1:15:19	2:20	2	(Italy) Miki Biasion (Italy) Giorgio Albiero (Italy) Livio Diamante	Iveco	1:15:19	2:20
1	3	(Brazil) André de Azevedo (Brazil) Maykel Justo (Czech Republic) Jaromír Martinec	Tatra	1:16:14	3:15	3	(Brazil) André de Azevedo (Brazil) Maykel Justo (Czech Republic) Jaromír Martinec	Tatra	1:16:14	3:15
2	1	(Russia) Vladimir Chagin (Russia) Semen Yabukov (Russia) Sergey Savostin	Kamaz	2:00:01		1	(Russia) Vladimir Chagin (Russia) Semen Yabukov (Russia) Sergey Savostin	Kamaz	3:13:00	
2	2	(Brazil) André de Azevedo (Brazil) Maykel Justo (Czech Republic) Jaromír Martinec	Tatra	2:01:51	1:50	2	(Brazil) André de Azevedo (Brazil) Maykel Justo (Czech Republic) Jaromír Martinec	Tatra	3:18:05	5:05
2	3	(Italy) Miki Biasion (Italy) Giorgio Albiero (Italy) Livio Diamante	Iveco	2:04:31	4:30	3	(Italy) Miki Biasion (Italy) Giorgio Albiero (Italy) Livio Diamante	Iveco	3:19:50	6:50
3	1	(Russia) Vladimir Chagin (Russia) Semen Yabukov (Russia) Sergey Savostin	Kamaz	3:25:51		1	(Russia) Vladimir Chagin (Russia) Semen Yabukov (Russia) Sergey Savostin	Kamaz	6:38:21	
3	2	(Italy) Miki Biasion (Italy) Giorgio Albiero (Italy) Livio Diamante	Iveco	3:32:27	7:06	2	(Italy) Miki Biasion (Italy) Giorgio Albiero (Italy) Livio Diamante	Iveco	6:52:17	13:56
3	3	(Netherlands) Hans Stacey (Belgium) Charly Gotlib (Netherlands) Bernard der Kinderen	MAN	3:34:58	9:37	3	(Brazil) André de Azevedo (Brazil) Maykel Justo (Czech Republic) Jaromír Martinec	Tatra	7:09:14	30:53
4	1	(Russia) Vladimir Chagin (Russia) Semen Yabukov (Russia) Sergey Savostin	Kamaz	4:57:09		1	(Russia) Vladimir Chagin (Russia) Semen Yabukov (Russia) Sergey Savostin	Kamaz	11:35:30	
4	2	(Netherlands) Hans Stacey (Belgium) Charly Gotlib (Netherlands) Bernard der Kinderen	MAN	4:59:51	2:42	2	(Czech Republic) Karel Loprais (Czech Republic) Petr Gilar (Czech Republic) Aleš Loprais	Tatra	12:44:17	1:08:47
4	3	(Russia) Firdaus Kabirov (Russia) Aydar Belyaev (Russia) Andrey Mokeev	Kamaz	5:14:19	17:10	3	(Russia) Firdaus Kabirov (Russia) Aydar Belyaev (Russia) Andrey Mokeev	Kamaz	12:54:11	1:18:41
5	1	(Russia) Vladimir Chagin (Russia) Semen Yabukov (Russia) Sergey Savostin	Kamaz	4:18:31		1	(Russia) Vladimir Chagin (Russia) Semen Yabukov (Russia) Sergey Savostin	Kamaz	15:54:01	
5	2	(Russia) Firdaus Kabirov (Russia) Aydar Belyaev (Russia) Andrey Mokeev	Kamaz	4:32:16	13:45	2	(Czech Republic) Karel Loprais (Czech Republic) Petr Gilar (Czech Republic) Aleš Loprais	Tatra	17:25:48	1:31:47
5	3	(Czech Republic) Karel Loprais (Czech Republic) Petr Gilar (Czech Republic) Aleš Loprais	Tatra	4:41:31	23:00	3	(Russia) Firdaus Kabirov (Russia) Aydar Belyaev (Russia) Andrey Mokeev	Kamaz	17:26:27	1:32:26
6	1	(Russia) Vladimir Chagin (Russia) Semen Yabukov (Russia) Sergey Savostin	Kamaz	4:03:19		1	(Russia) Vladimir Chagin (Russia) Semen Yabukov (Russia) Sergey Savostin	Kamaz	19:57:20	
6	2	(Netherlands) Hans Stacey (Belgium) Charly Gotlib (Netherlands) Bernard der Kinderen	MAN	4:20:42	17:23	2	(Russia) Firdaus Kabirov (Russia) Aydar Belyaev (Russia) Andrey Mokeev	Kamaz	21:57:20	2:00:00
6	3	(Russia) Firdaus Kabirov (Russia) Aydar Belyaev (Russia) Andrey Mokeev	Kamaz	4:30:53	27:34	3	(Czech Republic) Karel Loprais (Czech Republic) Petr Gilar (Czech Republic) Aleš Loprais	Tatra	22:05:03	2:07:43
7	1	(Netherlands) Hans Stacey (Belgium) Charly Gotlib (Netherlands) Bernard der Kinderen	MAN	8:25:05		1	(Russia) Vladimir Chagin (Russia) Semen Yabukov (Russia) Sergey Savostin	Kamaz	29:02:26	
7	2	(Russia) Firdaus Kabirov (Russia) Aydar Belyaev (Russia) Andrey Mokeev	Kamaz	8:27:34	2:29	2	(Russia) Firdaus Kabirov (Russia) Aydar Belyaev (Russia) Andrey Mokeev	Kamaz	30:24:54	1:22:28
7	3	(Brazil) André de Azevedo (Brazil) Maykel Justo (Czech Republic) Jaromír Martinec	Tatra	8:35:19	10:14	3	(Netherlands) Hans Stacey (Belgium) Charly Gotlib (Netherlands) Bernard der Kinderen	MAN	30:33:51	1:31:25
8	1	(Russia) Firdaus Kabirov (Russia) Aydar Belyaev (Russia) Andrey Mokeev	Kamaz	5:53:01		1	(Russia) Vladimir Chagin (Russia) Semen Yabukov (Russia) Sergey Savostin	Kamaz	35:47:23	
8	2	(Netherlands) Hans Stacey (Belgium) Charly Gotlib (Netherlands) Bernard der Kinderen	MAN	5:58:26	5:25	2	(Russia) Firdaus Kabirov (Russia) Aydar Belyaev (Russia) Andrey Mokeev	Kamaz	36:17:55	30:32
8	3	(Russia) Vladimir Chagin (Russia) Semen Yabukov (Russia) Sergey Savostin	Kamaz	6:44:57	51:56	3	(Netherlands) Hans Stacey (Belgium) Charly Gotlib (Netherlands) Bernard der Kinderen	MAN	36:32:17	44:54
9	1	(Russia) Vladimir Chagin (Russia) Semen Yabukov (Russia) Sergey Savostin	Kamaz	10:07:41		1	(Russia) Vladimir Chagin (Russia) Semen Yabukov (Russia) Sergey Savostin	Kamaz	45:55:04	
9	2	(Brazil) André de Azevedo (Brazil) Maykel Justo (Czech Republic) Jaromír Martinec	Tatra	10:41:25	33:44	2	(Russia) Firdaus Kabirov (Russia) Aydar Belyaev (Russia) Andrey Mokeev	Kamaz	49:35:54	3:40:50
9	3	(Czech Republic) Martin Macík (Czech Republic) Ladislav Fajtl	LIAZ	11:15:24	1:07:43	3	(Netherlands) Hans Stacey (Belgium) Charly Gotlib (Netherlands) Bernard der Kinderen	MAN	49:49:30	3:54:26
10	1	(Netherlands) Hans Stacey (Belgium) Charly Gotlib (Netherlands) Bernard der Kinderen	MAN	4:31:00		1	(Russia) Vladimir Chagin (Russia) Semen Yabukov (Russia) Sergey Savostin	Kamaz	50:49:46	
10	2	(Russia) Firdaus Kabirov (Russia) Aydar Belyaev (Russia) Andrey Mokeev	Kamaz	4:32:44	1:44	2	(Russia) Firdaus Kabirov (Russia) Aydar Belyaev (Russia) Andrey Mokeev	Kamaz	54:08:38	3:18:52
10	3	(Russia) Vladimir Chagin (Russia) Semen Yabukov (Russia) Sergey Savostin	Kamaz	4:54:42	23:42	3	(Netherlands) Hans Stacey (Belgium) Charly Gotlib (Netherlands) Bernard der Kinderen	MAN	54:20:30	3:30:44
11	1	(Netherlands) Hans Stacey (Belgium) Charly Gotlib (Netherlands) Bernard der Kinderen	MAN	4:20:15		1	(Russia) Vladimir Chagin (Russia) Semen Yabukov (Russia) Sergey Savostin	Kamaz	55:21:11	
11	2	(Brazil) André de Azevedo (Brazil) Maykel Justo (Czech Republic) Jaromír Martinec	Tatra	4:26:56	6:41	2	(Netherlands) Hans Stacey (Belgium) Charly Gotlib (Netherlands) Bernard der Kinderen	MAN	58:40:45	3:19:34
11	3	(Russia) Vladimir Chagin (Russia) Semen Yabukov (Russia) Sergey Savostin	Kamaz	4:31:25	11:10	3	(Russia) Firdaus Kabirov (Russia) Aydar Belyaev (Russia) Andrey Mokeev	Kamaz	59:02:45	3:41:34
12	1	(Netherlands) Hans Stacey (Belgium) Charly Gotlib (Netherlands) Bernard der Kinderen	MAN	5:41:02		1	(Russia) Vladimir Chagin (Russia) Semen Yabukov (Russia) Sergey Savostin	Kamaz	61:20:49	
12	2	(Russia) Firdaus Kabirov (Russia) Aydar Belyaev (Russia) Andrey Mokeev	Kamaz	5:53:28	12:26	2	(Netherlands) Hans Stacey (Belgium) Charly Gotlib (Netherlands) Bernard der Kinderen	MAN	64:21:47	3:00:58
12	3	(Russia) Vladimir Chagin (Russia) Semen Yabukov (Russia) Sergey Savostin	Kamaz	5:59:38	18:36	3	(Russia) Firdaus Kabirov (Russia) Aydar Belyaev (Russia) Andrey Mokeev	Kamaz	64:56:13	3:35:24
13	1	(Netherlands) Hans Stacey (Belgium) Charly Gotlib (Netherlands) Bernard der Kinderen	MAN	6:02:58		1	(Russia) Vladimir Chagin (Russia) Semen Yabukov (Russia) Sergey Savostin	Kamaz	67:54:13	
13	2	(Russia) Firdaus Kabirov (Russia) Aydar Belyaev (Russia) Andrey Mokeev	Kamaz	6:16:12	13:14	2	(Netherlands) Hans Stacey (Belgium) Charly Gotlib (Netherlands) Bernard der Kinderen	MAN	70:24:45	2:30:32
13	3	(Russia) Vladimir Chagin (Russia) Semen Yabukov (Russia) Sergey Savostin	Kamaz	6:33:24	30:26	3	(Russia) Firdaus Kabirov (Russia) Aydar Belyaev (Russia) Andrey Mokeev	Kamaz	71:12:25	3:18:12
14	1	(Russia) Firdaus Kabirov (Russia) Aydar Belyaev (Russia) Andrey Mokeev	Kamaz	3:15:43		1	(Russia) Vladimir Chagin (Russia) Semen Yabukov (Russia) Sergey Savostin	Kamaz	71:22:16	
14	2	(Netherlands) Hans Stacey (Belgium) Charly Gotlib (Netherlands) Bernard der Kinderen	MAN	3:18:40	2:57	2	(Netherlands) Hans Stacey (Belgium) Charly Gotlib (Netherlands) Bernard der Kinderen	MAN	73:43:25	2:21:09
14	3	(Brazil) André de Azevedo (Brazil) Maykel Justo (Czech Republic) Jaromír Martinec	Tatra	3:19:56	4:13	3	(Russia) Firdaus Kabirov (Russia) Aydar Belyaev (Russia) Andrey Mokeev	Kamaz	74:28:08	3:05:52
15	Stage not timed									

== Final standings ==
=== Motorcycles ===
Pos	No.	Rider	Bike	Entrant	Time
1	2	(Spain) Marc Coma	KTM LC4 660R	KTM Repsol-Red Bull	55:27:17
2	1	(France) Cyril Despres	KTM LC4 660R	Gauloises KTM France	+1:13:29
3	6	(Italy) Giovanni Sala	KTM LC4 660R	KTM Repsol-Red Bull	+2:29:48
4	9	(United States) Chris Blais	KTM LC4 660R	Red Bull KTM	+2:36:18
5	4	(Chile) Carlo de Gavardo	KTM LC4 660R	KTM Repsol-Red Bull	+3:22:47
6	5	(Norway) Pål Anders Ullevålseter	KTM	Team Scandinavia	+3:54:52
7	14	(France) Alain Duclos	KTM	KTM-Toni-Togo	+4:43:56
8	8	(France) David Casteu	KTM	Gauloises KTM France	+6:16:21
9	55	(Portugal) Hélder Rodrigues	Yamaha	Vodafone Banco Cetelem	+6:54:41
10	34	(Latvia) Jānis Vinters	KTM	SAF Moto Team Riga	+7:53:14

Pos	N°	Nom	Marque	Temps	Écart	Pénalité	Premiere fois	MARATHON	ELF	MALLE
1	2	COMA (ESP)	KTM	55:27:17	00:00:00					
2	1	DESPRES (FRA)	KTM	56:40:46	01:13:29					
3	6	SALA (ITA)	KTM	57:57:05	02:29:48					
4	9	BLAIS (USA)	KTM	58:03:35	02:36:18					
5	4	DE GAVARDO (CHI)	KTM	58:50:04	03:22:47	01:00:00				
6	5	ULLEVALSETER (NOR)	KTM	59:22:09	03:54:52					
7	14	DUCLOS (FRA)	KTM	60:11:13	04:43:56			1	1	
8	8	CASTEU (FRA)	KTM	61:43:38	06:16:21					
9	55	RODRIGUES (POR)	YAMAHA	62:21:58	06:54:41	02:00:00	1			
10	34	VINTERS (LET)	KTM	63:20:31	07:53:14				2	
11	11	GAU (FRA)	KTM	63:21:22	07:54:05		2			
12	58	KNUIMAN (HOL)	YAMAHA	63:56:44	08:29:27				3	
13	12	FRETIGNE (FRA)	YAMAHA	64:13:13	08:45:56					
14	19	CZACHOR (POL)	KTM	64:14:11	08:46:54					
15	32	ALGAY (FRA)	YAMAHA	64:15:25	08:48:08					
16	97	FARRES GUELL (ESP)	YAMAHA	64:41:44	09:14:27	30:00:00	3			
17	42	STREET (USA)	KTM	65:30:08	10:02:51		4			
18	85	BETHYS (FRA)	HONDA	65:37:18	10:10:01		5			
19	20	MARCHINI (FRA)	YAMAHA	66:29:17	11:02:00	02:00:00				
20	95	AGRA CARRERA (ESP)	YAMAHA	67:04:42	11:37:25	13:00	6			
21	28	CROQUELOIS (FRA)	YAMAHA	67:53:26	12:26:09					
22	29	PIROUD (FRA)	YAMAHA	67:58:16	12:30:59					
23	76	LEPAN (FRA)	KTM	68:05:49	12:38:32			2	4	
24	16	STANOVNIK (SLO)	KTM	69:33:43	14:06:26	02:30:00		3		
25	80	GONCALVES (POR)	HONDA	70:55:48	15:28:31	01:05:00	7			
26	15	VERHOEVEN (HOL)	YAMAHA	72:02:14	16:34:57	03:55:00			5	
27	49	EXTANCE (UK)	HONDA	72:14:44	16:47:27	05:00			6	
28	31	PAIN (FRA)	YAMAHA	72:48:48	17:21:31					
29	110	CARILLON (FRA)	KTM	73:18:02	17:50:45			4	7	1
30	37	KASTAN (CZE)	KTM	73:33:27	18:06:10			5	8	2
31	61	DUBOIS (FRA)	KTM	74:55:52	19:28:35				9	
32	63	LAZARD (URU)	KTM	75:43:15	20:15:58		8	6	10	
33	152	VAN PELT (HOL)	HONDA	75:47:22	20:20:05	02:25:00			11	3
34	39	RIVERA (ESP)	KTM	76:45:28	21:18:11	01:00:00		7		4
35	160	FARIA (POR)	KTM	76:51:20	21:24:03	01:27:00	9			5
36	68	MENGUS (FRA)	KTM	77:30:27	22:03:10		10	8		
37	211	HOTTA (JAP)	KTM	77:51:41	22:24:24			9		
38	170	BONJEAN (FRA)	HONDA	78:40:53	23:13:36		11		12	6
39	26	LAMOTHE (FRA)	KTM	79:02:07	23:34:50		12			
40	177	DE GROOT (HOL)	YAMAHA	79:40:51	24:13:34	01:00:00	13			
41	51	DUBUY (FRA)	KTM	79:49:13	24:21:56					
42	46	RAYMOND (FRA)	YAMAHA	79:56:40	24:29:23					
43	134	DE BAAR (HOL)	KTM	80:08:48	24:41:31	01:08:00		10		
44	82	VAN DRUNEN (HOL)	YAMAHA	80:25:59	24:58:42	07:07:00	14			
45	219	GINEPRO (ITA)	KTM	80:29:41	25:02:24					7
46	87	MEILLAT (FRA)	HONDA	80:51:45	25:24:28	10:40:00				
47	13	PAGNON (FRA)	KTM	81:07:50	25:40:33					8
48	47	HERMET (FRA)	KTM	81:10:37	25:43:20	02:51:00				
49	35	FLOIRAC (FRA)	KTM	81:11:13	25:43:56	01:00:00	15	11		
50	117	PUERTAS HERRERA (ESP)	YAMAHA	81:27:16	25:59:59	01:00				
51	223	FERRER GARCIA (ESP)	YAMAHA	82:12:43	26:45:26	32:00:00				
52	27	JOBARD (FRA)	KTM	82:27:35	27:00:18			12		
53	204	GOMEZ PALLAS (VEN)	YAMAHA	82:31:46	27:04:29	01:35:00				
54	154	VERCOELEN (HOL)	KTM	83:03:15	27:35:58	01:35:00		13		9
55	118	MIOTTO (ITA)	KTM	83:06:25	27:39:08			14		10
56	132	EMBRO (USA)	KTM	83:38:36	28:11:19	15:00	16			
57	25	RAMON (BEL)	YAMAHA	83:45:01	28:17:44	01:01:00				11
58	129	ARREDONDO (GUA)	KTM	83:54:00	28:26:43			15		
59	59	GODET (FRA)	KTM	83:56:33	28:29:16	01:10:00				
60	22	VARGA (HON)	KTM	84:17:43	28:50:26					
61	53	LE BLEVEC (FRA)	YAMAHA	84:47:42	29:20:25		17			
62	214	MORA BUSQUETS (ESP)	YAMAHA	85:36:14	30:08:57	01:00:00	18			
63	212	KASHIWA (JAP)	YAMAHA	85:52:23	30:25:06	15:00				
64	36	DIALLO (SEN)	KTM	87:10:20	31:43:03			16		
65	184	DELAYE (FRA)	KTM	87:30:04	32:02:47	32:00:00				
66	195	DOTTORI (ITA)	KTM	87:46:25	32:19:08	01:30:00	19	17		
67	116	WATSON-MILLER (ALL)	KTM	87:59:29	32:32:12			18		
68	44	CORNUAILLE (FRA)	KTM	88:03:44	32:36:27					
69	52	BONNET (FRA)	KTM	88:53:32	33:26:15	38:00:00		19		12
70	93	LANSARD (FRA)	KTM	89:18:42	33:51:25					
71	108	CONIJN (HOL)	YAMAHA	89:25:01	33:57:44		20			
72	187	MEILINK (HOL)	YAMAHA	89:29:19	34:02:02	36:00:00	21			
73	109	LIST (HOL)	YAMAHA	89:31:56	34:04:39		22			
74	186	VAN DER VELD (HOL)	YAMAHA	89:49:28	34:22:11	58:00:00	23			
75	135	DE GROOT (HOL)	YAMAHA	90:02:15	34:34:58	30:00:00	24			
76	102	ALGERI (ITA)	YAMAHA	90:17:15	34:49:58	01:00:00				
77	120	CLASSEN (AFS)	KTM	90:43:13	35:15:56	02:10:00	25	19		13
78	181	PLUMB (UK)	BMW	92:04:03	36:36:46	01:50:00				
79	247	GONZALEZ (ESP)	BOMBARDIER	92:25:04	36:57:47	01:18:00				
80	81	POL (HOL)	YAMAHA	92:40:27	37:13:10	31:00:00	26			
81	148	PERIGAUD (FRA)	KTM	93:30:48	38:03:31					14
82	83	BARRAL (FRA)	YAMAHA	96:08:46	40:41:29		27			
83	243	MOREL (FRA)	BOMBARDIER	96:28:07	41:00:50					
84	98	KRYNOCK (USA)	KTM	96:35:26	41:08:09	01:00:00	28			
85	244	MOREL (FRA)	BOMBARDIER	98:24:07	42:56:50		29			
86	174	PAVEY (AUS)	BMW	98:49:53	43:22:36	50:00:00				
87	89	MAURICE (FRA)	KTM	99:12:35	43:45:18	55:00:00	30			
88	100	QUICK (UK)	KTM	103:27:17	48:00:00	02:00:00				
89	101	TOWN (UK)	KTM	103:27:54	48:00:37	02:00:00				
90	220	BONJEAN (BRE)	KTM	105:59:07	50:31:50	01:00:00	31			
91	130	VERMELOUX (FRA)	KTM	108:02:50	52:35:33	03:48:00	32			
92	226	GARCIA DOMINGUEZ (ESP)	BMW	111:44:01	56:16:44	02:00:00	33			
93	215	VAN BERGEIJK (HOL)	YAMAHA	127:46:33	72:19:16	13:06:00	34			15

=== Cars ===
Pos	No.	Driver	Co-Driver	Car	Entrant	Time
1	302	(France) Luc Alphand	(France) Gilles Picard	Mitsubishi	Mitsubishi Ralliart	53:47:32
2	305	(South Africa) Giniel de Villiers	(Sweden) Tina Thörner	Volkswagen	Volkswagen Motorsport	+17:53
3	304	(Spain) Nani Roma	(Andorra) Henri Magne	Mitsubishi	Mitsubishi Ralliart	+1:50:38
4	300	(France) Stéphane Peterhansel	(France) Jean-Paul Cottret	Mitsubishi	Mitsubishi Ralliart	+3:20:24
5	309	(United States) Mark Miller	(Germany) Dirk von Zitzewitz	Volkswagen	Volkswagen Motorsport	+3:23:25
6	314	(France) Jean-Louis Schlesser	(France) François Borsotto	Schlesser-Ford	Schlesser-Ford Raid	+4:09:23
7	311	(Portugal) Carlos Sousa	(Belgium) Jean-Marie Lurquin	Nissan	Team Galp Energia	+5:40:11
8	301	(France) Bruno Saby	(France) Michel Périn	Volkswagen	Volkswagen Motorsport	+8:14:45
9	322	(France) Guerlain Chicherit	(France) Mathieu Baumel	BMW	Team X-Raid	+8:25:13
10	315	(France) Thierry Magnaldi	(France) Arnaud Debron	Schlesser-Ford	Schlesser-Ford Raid	+8:25:57

=== Trucks ===
Pos	No.	Driver	Co-Drivers	Truck	Time
1	508	(Russia) Vladimir Chagin	(Russia) Semen Yakubov (Russia) Sergey Savostin	Kamaz	71:22:16
2	524	(Netherlands) Hans Stacey	(Belgium) Charly Gotlib (Netherlands) Bernard der Kinderen	MAN	+2:21:09
3	500	(Russia) Firdaus Kabirov	(Russia) Aydar Belyaev (Russia) Andrey Mokeev	Kamaz	+3:05:52
4	513	(Brazil) André de Azevedo	(Brazil) Maykel Justo (Czech Republic) Jaromír Martinec	Tatra 815	+5:30:51
5	501	(Japan) Yoshimasa Sugawara	(Japan) Katsumi Hamura	Hino	+9:42:25
6	503	(Italy) Giacomo Vismara	(Italy) Mario Cambiaghi	Mercedes-Benz	+11:13:04
7	505	(Japan) Teruhito Sugawara	(Japan) Seiichi Suzuki	Hino	+12:42:13
8	530	(Germany) Franz Echter	(Germany) Peter Gobel (Netherlands) Edwin van Dooren	MAN	+13:57:26
9	528	(Austria) Karl Sadlauer	(Austria) Franz Maier (Austria) Martin Mayer	MAN	+14:21:54
10	546	(Austria) Peter Reif	(Austria) Gunter Pichlbauer (Austria) Stefan Huber	MAN	+15:01:20

== In media ==
A motorcycle team organized by English actor Charley Boorman competed in the rally. Boorman was injured and fellow team member Matt Hall dropped out, but Simon Pavey finished in 86th place. Their experience was documented in the 2006 television miniseries Race to Dakar and an accompanying book.
