= Mark Miller (racer) =

American professional off-road racer

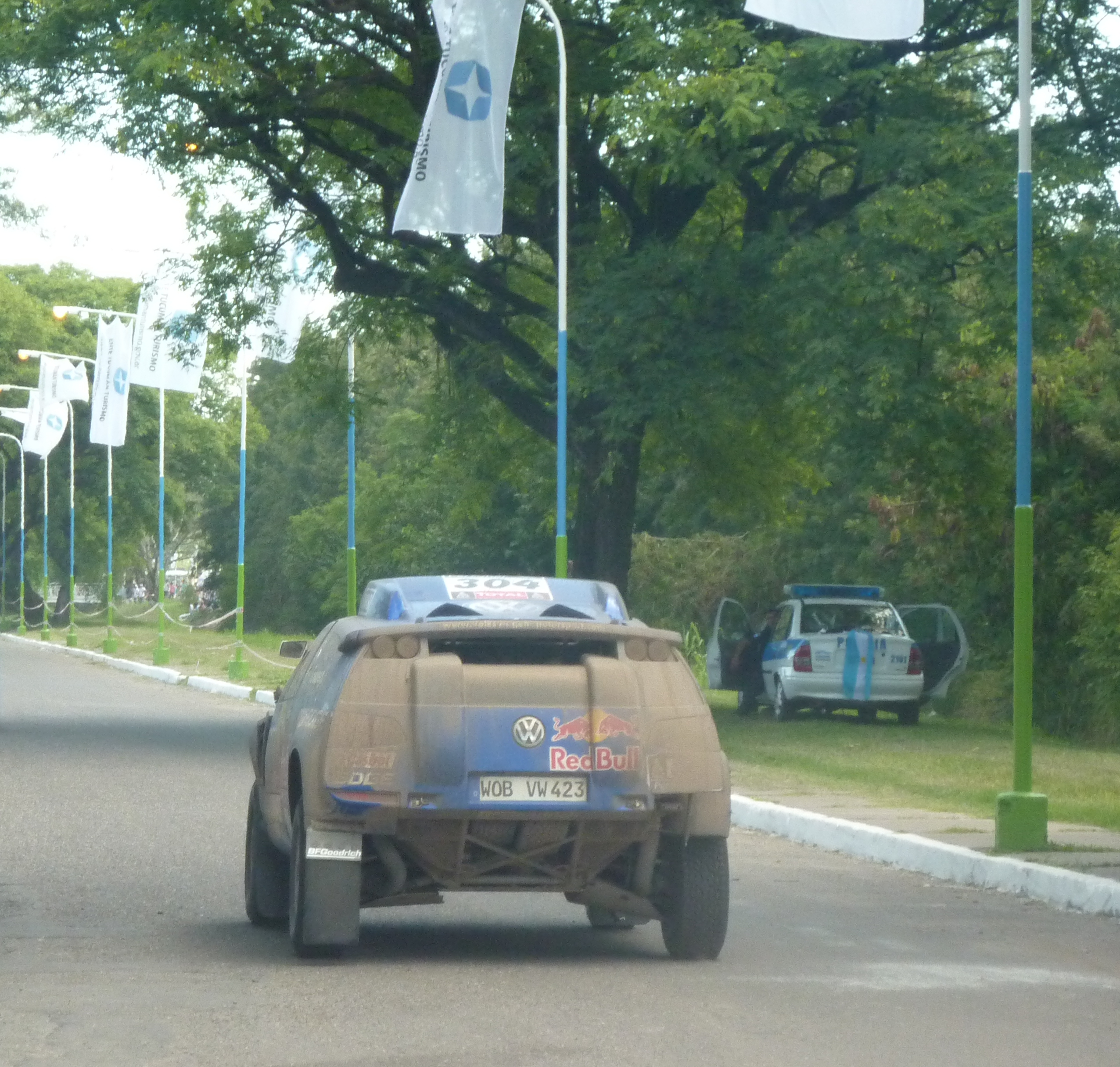
Mark Miller's car during 2011 Dakar Rally

Mark Miller (born October 24, 1962) is an American professional off-road racer, competing in both cars and on motorcycles.

Miller was born in Phoenix, Arizona, lives both in Arizona and Colorado, and has two sons, Nick and Sam. His non-racing profession was investing, and his hobbies include enduro motorcycling, mountain bikes, fly fishing and snowmobiling.

Miller has competed in SCORE, NASCAR, Rally, Rally-Raid and other classes and competitions. In April 2008, he competed in the 2008 Central Europe Rally, the first in the new series of events created by the promoters of the Dakar Rally. Miller was competing for the Volkswagen factory team in a diesel Touareg (#206) but crashed out of the competition on the first day.

Before the 2010 Dakar Rally, Sports Illustrated published this article

After Stage 5 of the 2010 Dakar Rally, AutoSport wrote this article about Miller winning the stage.

In 2011, Miller published a book about his life, Dash-The Dakar Rally, Life and Happiness.

== Sporting career highlights ==
- 1999 – AMA 4-stroke National Enduro Champion, Silver Medal Portugal ISDE
- 2000 – 1st Trophy Tuck Nevada 2000, 3rd Trophy Truck Baja 2000
- 2002 – 1st Trophy Tuck Baja 500
- 2003 – 1st place Trophy Truck Baja 1000, Baja 500, Parker 400
- 2004 – 1st place Trophy Truck Baja 1000
- 2006 – 5th place Dakar Rally (Volkswagen) Race Touareg
- 2007 – 4th place Dakar Rally (Volkswagen) Race Touareg
- 2008 – 2nd Place Rally dos Sertões (Volkswagen) Race Touareg
- 2009 – 2nd place Dakar Rally Silk Way Rally Russia 2nd Place
- 2010 – 3rd place Dakar Rally
- 2011 – 6th place 2011 Dakar Rally
