= List of Dakar Rally fatal accidents =

List of motorsport accidents

This is a list of Dakar Rally fatal accidents involving both competitors and non-competitors who have died during a Dakar Rally event.

Since 1979, 79 people are known to have died as a result of the Dakar rally. Among the 33 competitor fatalities, 24 were motorcycle related, 6 car related, 1 truck related, and 2 competitors died as a result of local rebel conflict. Up to 1992, collision was the most common cause of death among competitors.

Among the 46 non-competitor fatalities are those of the race's founder Thierry Sabine, 14 news journalists and support crew, 23 spectators, and 4 children.

The Dakar Rally has received criticism because of its high mortality rates, with the Vatican Paper describing the event as "the bloody race of irresponsibility". The event received particular criticism in the 1988 race, when three Africans were killed in collisions with vehicles involved in the race. PANA, a Dakar-based news agency, wrote that the deaths were "insignificant for the [race's] organizers". The Dakar organizers have not officially recorded or reported on African and Latin American spectator and innocent bystanders deaths. As a result, fatality numbers for the Dakar vary from source to source, and bystander victims usually remain unnamed.

== List of fatal accidents involving competitors ==
No	Name	Date	Place	Stage	Vehicle	Type
1	(France) Patrice Dodin	January 1979	Agadez, Niger	Agadez—Tahoua	Yamaha XT 500	Motorcycle
Dodin, a French expatriate in Africa, lost control of his Yamaha while adjusting his helmet and fell approaching the start of the stage Agadez-Tahoua, hitting his head on a stone, sustaining a skull fracture. He was transferred to a hospital in Paris where he later died.
2	(Netherlands) Bert Oosterhuis	7 January 1982	Ecker, Algeria	Quatre Chemins—Tit	Yamaha XT 570	Motorcycle
Oosterhuis, former road racing champion in the Netherlands, was killed between Bordj Omar Driss and Tit in Algeria. He was 41 years of age.
3	(France) Jean-Noël Pineau	14 January 1983	Léo, Upper Volta	In-Gall—Korhogo	Yamaha XT 550	Motorcycle
In his fourth rally, Team Yamaha-France rider Pineau was killed on a section of tarmac near Léo when he collided with a military vehicle. His best finish was third overall.
4	(Japan) Yasuo Kaneko	2 January 1986	Sète, France	Versailles—Sète	Honda XR 500	Motorcycle
In his second start in the Dakar Rally, a non-entrant Peugeot 205 crashed into Kaneko's motorcycle at 01:30 on Thursday, 2 January 1986, about eight kilometres before the harbour of Sète, killing him instantly. The unnamed driver of the car was believed to have been driving under the influence of alcohol. Kaneko was 41 years of age.
5	(Italy) Giampaolo Marinoni	24 January 1986	Dakar, Senegal	Saint Louis—Dakar	Cagiva Elefant 650	Motorcycle
Marinoni, a test rider of production motorcycles for Cagiva and in his second rally, fell 40 km from the finish line at the final stage of the rally. He managed to reach the finish line in thirteenth place amongst 131 starters and 29 finishers of riders. Initially Marinoni did not feel that one of the brake levers of his Lucky Explorer-Cagiva had hurt his liver during the fall. He later arrived to be treated for his injuries in a hospital in Dakar, he succumbed to an infection two days later.
6	(France) Jean-Claude Huger	17 January 1988	Nampalari	Tombouctou—Bamako	BMW R 100 GS	Motorcycle
Huger was an escort rider for the President of the Republic of France and motorcyclist of the Gendarmerie Nationale. He crashed his BMW RT100 into a ditch near Nampala and hit his head on a rock, sustaining cranial trauma and lapsing into a coma. He was airlifted to Paris where he died two days later without regaining consciousness.
7	(Netherlands) Kees van Loevezijn	9 January 1988	Djado, Niger	Djado—Agadez	DAF FAV3600 95X2	Truck
Theo van de Rijt, driver, Kees van Loevezijn, engineer, and Chris Ross from Scotland, were in a factory-entered DAF which had won its class the previous year. They hit a sand dune at about 180 km/h 20 km from the start of a 666 km (414 mi) leg and somersaulted several times, destroying the truck. Van Loevezijn was thrown out of the truck and died instantly. Van de Rijt and Ross were taken to a hospital in Agadez and airlifted to the Netherlands where they recovered. DAF withdrew the team from the rally and later terminated all motor-sport activities, selling the trucks and spare parts to factory driver Jan De Rooy's team. De Rooy re-entered the rally in 2002, at the age of 58.
8	(France) Patrick Canado	9 January 1988	Arlit, Niger	Djado—Agadez	Range Rover	Automobile
During the seventh stage of the rally, Djado-Agadez, on a large desert road, the Range Rover of French team René Boubet and Patrick Canado and the Mercedes-Benz 280 of Italian team Klaus Seppi and Ambrogio Azzuffi collided at full speed some 25 km from the start of Arlit. Boubet's car, as it had steering problems, suddenly swerved into the other car and rolled several times. Co-driver Canado was thrown out of the car and was killed instantly; Boubet was seriously injured.
9	(France) François Picquot	3 January 1991	?, Libya	Ghadames—Idri	Nissan Terrano	Automobile
During the second stage of the rally, Jacques Houssat, at the wheel of a Perlini P105 truck, crashed into the Henri de Roissard's and François Picquot's Nissan Patrol. The latter sustained head injuries and broken pelvis; he was airlifted to a hospital in France, where he later succumbed to his injuries. Houssat was eventually the winner of the truck category.
10	(France) Charles Cabannes	13 January 1991	In Kadeouane, Mali	Tombouctou—Néma	Mercedes-Benz	Truck
Cabannes, a support truck driver for the Citroën factory team, was shot dead by rebels at the side of the road in the small village of In Kadeouane during the 8th stage of the rally. His co-driver Joël Guyomarc'h had a superficial wound. The killing was not claimed by any rebel organization in the following days but was believed to be related to the conflict between the Malian army and Tuareg rebels. Organisers cancelled the following two rounds on schedule and the Malian army escorted the competitors while passing through the country. After the incident, team Nissan-Spain withdrew from the race.
11	(France) Laurent Le Bourgeois	27 December 1991	Sabha, Libya	Sirte—Sabha	Land Rover Defender	Automobile
12	(France) Jean-Marie Sounillac	27 December 1991	Sabha, Libya	Sirte—Sabha	Land Rover Defender	Automobile
The Land Rover Defender of Laurent Le Bourgeois and Jean-Marie Sounillac was an assistance vehicle for Jean-Louis Schlesser's prototype buggy "Le Duc de Bourgogne". It overturned several times in the Libyan desert of Sabah just a few kilometers before the end of the fifth stage of the rally. The impact of the crash caused the roll-bar of the car to collapse and both the occupants were crushed and killed at the scene.
13	(France) Gilles Lalay	7 January 1992	Lumonbo, Congo-Brazzaville	Francaville—Pointe-Noire	Yamaha-Byrd YZE750T	Motorcycle
Two hours after the end of the Francaville-Pointe Noire stage in Congo, 1989 winner Lalay, who finished fourth on the stage, was en route to the bivouac, when he was struck head-on by a Toyota belonging to the medical-assistance of the event organisers TSO (Thierry Sabine Organization). Lalay was taken to hospital at Lumonbo, where he succumbed to his injuries some hours later.
14	(Belgium) Michel Sansen	4 January 1994	Nouakchott, Mauritania	Nouakchott—Dakar	BMW	Motorcycle
During the 8th stage, Sansen on his fifth start of the rally, running at speed on asphalt, suddenly lost control over a strip of sand, causing him to fall off, killing himself instantly. His nephew Jean-Philippe Miglotte, on another BMW, later immediately withdrew from the event following his uncle's death.
15	(France) Laurent Gueguen	3 January 1996	Forum El Hassam, Morocco	El Hassan—Smara	Mercedes-Benz	Truck
While attempting to complete the 5th stage, Gueguen, driving a Mercedes-Benz truck (support vehicle for the Citroën team), got caught up in a conflict between the Moroccan army and the Polisario Front rebels. Following the stage, on a desert track some 400 meters from the signed path, the vehicle struck an abandoned Moroccan army land mine, causing it to explode, overturn, and burst into flames from the impact, killing him instantly. Gueguen's co-drivers, Pascal Loudenot and Vincent Bauden, were able to escape from the wreckage, while Gueguen, who was driving at the moment of the accident, died.
16	(France) Jean-Pierre Leduc	5 January 1997	Tambacounda, Mali	Tambacounda—Kayes	KTM	Motorcycle
French amateur rider Jean-Pierre Leduc, on his debut rally, fell off and was killed instantly, after riding for 247 km of the second-stage rally.
17	(Belgium) Daniel Vergnes	8 January 2002	Aleg, Mauritania	Atâr—Tidjikja	Toyota Land Cruiser	Automobile
During the 11th stage, the Toyota, which was entered in the rally as back-up car, rolled off a treacherous stretch of desert road en route to the stage finish in Tidjikja, throwing out Vergnes, the mechanic of the Toyota Trophy team, and he died hours later. His three teammates, Briton Sheona Dorson-King, Belgium's Christophe Van Rief, and France's Benoît Agoyer, were all taken to hospital in Nouakchott. It is not known who was driving the car when the accident occurred.
18	(France) Bruno Cauvy	11 January 2003	?, Libya	Zilla—Sarir	Toyota Land Cruiser	Automobile
Daniel Nebot's and Bruno Cauvy's Toyota rolled over at high speed 265 km (165 mi) into the stage between Zilla and Sarir. The medical helicopter reached the overturned vehicle half an hour later; by then the co-driver Cauvy, who was on his debut rally, had died from his injuries; Nebot escaped with a few injuries.
19	(Spain) José Manuel Pérez	6 January 2005		Zouérat—Tichit	KTM 660R	Motorcycle
Perez, in his fourth rally, sustained injuries to his stomach when he fell off his bike before the first checkpoint of the seventh stage from Zouérat to Tichit in Mauritania. He was immediately treated by the medical teams of the rally, who transferred him to the bivouac in Zouérat by helicopter. During an emergency procedure, he had his spleen, part of the liver and one kidney removed. He was later transferred to the Clinique du Cap in Dakar, Senegal, but his condition continued to worsen. He was airlifted to a hospital in Alicante, Spain, where he was put in intensive care and died a few hours later, three days after his accident.
20	(Italy) Fabrizio Meoni	11 January 2005		Atâr—Kiffa	KTM 660R	Motorcycle
Meoni, winner of the rally in 2001 and 2002, crashed a few minutes after the first checkpoint during the 11th stage rally, breaking his neck. A witness to the crash, fellow rider David Fretigne, signaled for medical attention. By the time a medical helicopter arrived, they were unable to revive him; his cause of death was heart failure. As grieving riders were unable to continue racing the next day, organisers cancelled the twelfth stage for all motorcyclists out of respect of Meoni. The rally was his 13th and was to be his last. He had held the lead until losing it on the previous leg to the eventual winner, Cyril Despres.
21	(Australia) Andy Caldecott	9 January 2006	Ouassane, Mauritania	Nouakchott—Kiffa	KTM 660R	Motorcycle
Caldecott, standing in for injured Spaniard Jordi Duran to ride in the factory KTM team, was killed instantly when he crashed halfway through a stage between Nouakchott and Kiffa in Mauritania. His best finish was sixth in the previous year.
22	(South Africa) Elmer Symons	9 January 2007	Boumaine Dades, Morocco	Er Rachidia—Ouarzazate	KTM 660R	Motorcycle
Symons had participated in the 2005 and 2006 rally as a support mechanic and was making his debut as a rider. He crashed his privateer KTM and died at the scene 142 km into the fourth stage. The emergency helicopter arrived within eight minutes of his emergency alert beacon triggering, but was unable to do anything other than record his death. He was in 18th place for motorcycles overall, and led the Marathon class after the previous stage. Symons was the rally's 49th fatality.
23	(France) Éric Aubijoux	20 January 2007	Dakar, Senegal	Tambacounda—Dakar	Yamaha 450WRF	Motorcycle
During the 14th and penultimate stage Tambacounda and Dakar, Aubijoux, in his sixth rally, suffered a massive heart attack about 15 km from the finish line at Dakar, Senegal. He fell and died on the spot. Initially it was thought that this was due to heart failure. Investigation found that the cause of death was the result of an accident. To add further confusion, his bike was revealed to be undamaged and he was believed to have pulled over feeling unwell and then collapsed due to a seizure. He never regained consciousness and died at the scene. He was declared 18th position overall. It was later suggested that Aubijoux died of internal injuries sustained in a crash earlier that day while competing in the 14th stage of the race.
24	(France) Pascal Terry	4 January 2009	Cuchillo Cò, La Pampa, Argentina	Santa Rosa de la Pampa—Puerto Madryn	Yamaha 450WRF	Motorcycle
At the second stage of the rally, Terry, in his debut rally, ran out of fuel and sent out an emergency signal to organisers. It was believed that the organisers were misinformed that Terry had reported back to the Dakar caravan at the end of the stage, therefore the search was abandoned, but it turned out to be his brother, also a competitor, who was in the camp. Terry was missing for three days; he was found dead fifty metres from his motorcycle. His cause of death was pulmonary edema, and it was believed that he likely died late Sunday evening or early Monday morning and that his life could have been saved had the search operation begun promptly.
25	(Argentina) Jorge Andrés Martínez Boero	1 January 2012	Mar del Plata, Argentina	Mar del Plata-Santa Rosa de la Pampa	Beta RR 450 Modele 2011	Motorcycle
He died following a crash on the opening day.
26	(France) Thomas Bourgin	11 January 2013	Andes, Chile	Calama-Salta	KTM	Motorcycle
Bourgin was killed in a road accident with a Chilean police car while travelling to the start of the day's stage.
27	(Belgium) Eric Palante	10 January 2014	Northern Argentina	Chilecito-Salta	Honda	Motorcycle
Officials found Palante's body after he failed to finish the stage.
28	(Poland) Michał Hernik	6 January 2015	Argentina	San Juan-Chilecito	KTM	Motorcycle
Officials found Hernik's body after he failed to finish the stage.
29	(Portugal) Paulo Gonçalves	12 January 2020	Saudi Arabia	Riyadh-Wadi Al-Dawasir	Hero	Motorcycle
A helicopter was sent to the scene where medics found Gonçalves unconscious, having gone into cardiac arrest. He was airlifted to Layla Hospital where he was pronounced dead. After consultation with the riders, the organizers decided to cancel the next stage for bikes and quads.
30	(Netherlands) Edwin Straver	24 January 2020	Saudi Arabia	Shubaytah-Haradh	KTM	Motorcycle
After a low-speed crash in the 11th stage on 16 January 2020, Straver was resuscitated at the scene. It took emergency workers 10 minutes to get his heart beating again. He was rushed to a hospital in Riyadh, where examination showed that he had broken one of his upper neck vertebrae. After being in critical condition for over a week, Edwin was taken off assisted respiration and died on 24 January.
31	(France) Pierre Cherpin	14 January 2021	Saudi Arabia	Ha'il-Sakaka	Husqvarna	Motorcycle
Cherpin crashed 178 km into the 7th stage on 11 January. He was airlifted to hospital in Sakaka where he was diagnosed with severe head trauma and placed in an induced coma following emergency neurosurgery. He was then transferred to a hospital in Jeddah, and from there was transferred to Lille. Cherpin died from his injuries mid-flight en route to Lille on 14 January.
32	(France) Quentin Lavallée	14 January 2022	Saudi Arabia	Bisha-Jeddah	?	Automobile
Lavallée, the chief mechanic for the PH-Sport team in the Classics class, was driving an assistance car when he collided with a local truck roughly 234 km into the liaison for the final stage of the rally. Lavallée was killed at the scene, aged 20. His passenger, Belgian Maxime Frère, was injured, but remained conscious and was transported to hospital.
33	(Spain) Carles Falcón	15 January 2024	Saudi Arabia	Al Henakiyah - Ad Dawadimi	KTM	Motorcycle
Near the end of Stage 2 on 7 January, Falcón suffered a severe crash and was initially found without a pulse before being airlifted to Al Duwadimi hospital. Falcón suffered a cerebral oedema due to the fracture of the C2 vertebra, as well as a fractures to five ribs, the left wrist and the collarbone. Falcón died from his injuries eight days later.

== List of fatal accidents involving non-competitors ==
No	Name	Date	Place	Stage	Vehicle	Type
1	(Italy) Andrea Carisi	6 January 1981	In Salah, Algeria	—	Fiat Campagnola	Automobile
2	(Italy) Giuseppe De Tommaso	6 January 1981	In Salah, Algeria	—	Fiat Campagnola	Automobile
3	(Italy) Franco Druetta	6 January 1981	In Salah, Algeria	—	Fiat Campagnola	Automobile
During a displacement stage, a support Fiat Campagnola following the 1981 Paris-Dakar, went off the road and rolled several times, killing all three Italian occupants.
4	(France) Ursula Zentsch	January ? 1982	Markala, Mali	Temaouine—Gao	Mercedes-Benz	Truck
Journalist
5	(Mali) Unknown	January ? 1982	Mali	—	n/a	n/a
Passer-by
6	(Burkina Faso) Unknown	January ? 1984	Upper Volta	—	n/a	n/a
Spectator
7	(Niger) Unknown	January ? 1985	Niger	—	n/a	n/a
Spectator
8	(France) Philippe Beau	January ? 1985	?, Mauritania	Tichit—Kiffa		Helicopter
Pilot
9	(Switzerland) François-Xavier Bagnoud	14 January 1986	Gourma Rharous, Mali	Niamey—Gourma	Eurocopter Ecureuil	Helicopter
10	(France) Jean-Paul Lefur	14 January 1986	Gourma Rharous, Mali	Niamey—Gourma	Eurocopter Ecureuil	Helicopter
11	(France) Nathalie Odent	14 January 1986	Gourma Rharous, Mali	Niamey—Gourma	Eurocopter Ecureuil	Helicopter
12	(France) Thierry Sabine	14 January 1986	Gourma Rharous, Mali	Niamey—Gourma	Eurocopter Ecureuil	Helicopter
13	(France) Daniel Balavoine	14 January 1986	Gourma Rharous, Mali	Niamey—Gourma	Eurocopter Ecureuil	Helicopter
The helicopter crashed into a dune during a sudden sand-storm. The accident took the life of the founder and organizer of the Dakar, Thierry Sabine, and four other persons: a well-known French pop singer Daniel Balavoine, the journalist Nathalie Odent, a radio engineer Jean-Paul Lefur and the helicopter pilot François-Xavier Bagnoud.
14	(France) Henri Mouren	January 1987	Kiffa, Mauritania	Tidjikja—Atar		Automobile
Support crew
15	(Mali) Baye Sibi	18 January 1988	Kitta, Mali	Bamako—Kayes	n/a	n/a
Pedestrian
16	(Mauritania) Unknown	21 January 1988	Mauritania	Nouakchott—Richard Toll	n/a	n/a
17	(Mauritania) Unknown	21 January 1988	Mauritania	Nouakchott—Richard Toll	n/a	n/a
Spectator
18	(Senegal) Unknown	22 January 1988	Dakar, Senegal	Richard Toll—Dakar	n/a	n/a
Spectator
19	(Finland) Kaj Salminen	9 January 1990	Markala, Mali	Tidjika—Kayes		Automobile
Finnish journalist Kaj Salminen was killed when the service-car he was driving crashed into a parked tractor during the 16th stage.
20	(Chad) Unknown	2 January 1992	Rig Rig, Chad	N'Djamena—Sarh	n/a	n/a
21	(Chad) Unknown	2 January 1992	Rig Rig, Chad	N'Djamena—Sarh	n/a	n/a
Spectators
22	(Spain) Tomás Urpí	1 January 1996		Oujda—Er Rachidia		Automobile
Spectator
23	(Guinea) Unknown	12 January 1996	Ecker, Algeria	Kayes—Labé	n/a	n/a
Pedestrian
24	(Mauritania) Unknown	12 January 1998	Nouakchott, Mauritania	Displacement	n/a	n/a
25	(Mauritania) Unknown	12 January 1998	Nouakchott, Mauritania	Displacement	n/a	n/a
26	(Mauritania) Unknown	12 January 1998	Nouakchott, Mauritania	Displacement	n/a	n/a
27	(Mauritania) Unknown	12 January 1998	Nouakchott, Mauritania	Displacement	n/a	n/a
28	(Mauritania) Unknown	12 January 1998	Nouakchott, Mauritania	Displacement	n/a	n/a
French team Francis Bouney and Guy Aliphat crashed their Toyota 11TJ80 into a minibus during their displacement stage.
29	(Burkina Faso) Unknown	8 January, 1999	Burkina Faso	Nioro—Bobo-Dioulasso	n/a	Automobile
French competitor Henri De Roissard lost control of his Nissan Terrano and crashed into a vehicle of the Burkina Faso gendarmerie. The policeman who was at the wheel died several hours later.
30	(France) Unknown	28 December 2001		Châteauroux—Narbonne	n/a	Automobile
During the 2nd stage, a French citizen crashed into an assistance car from the rally.
31	(Senegal) Unknown	11 January 2005		Châteauroux—Narbonne	n/a	Automobile
During the displacement stage of the assistance trucks to the finish-line in Senegal territory about 160 km from Dakar, a five-year-old Senegalese girl ran onto the main road in the path of a service lorry, where she was crushed beneath its wheels.
32	(Guinea) Boubacar Diallo	12 January 2006	Kourahoye, Labé, Guinea	Labé—Tambacounda	n/a	n/a
Diallo, a 10-year-old boy from the Guinean village of Kourahoye, was watching the rally with his parents when he was struck by a competitor's car when he attempted to cross the road. He was being transported by helicopter to Labé when he died.
33	(Senegal) Mohamed N'Daw	14 January 2006	Kaffrine, Senegal	Tambacounda—Dakar	n/a	n/a
N'Daw was hit by a rally car driven by Maris Saukans of Latvia in the late morning on the RN1 road at the 200 km point of the penultimate stage between Tambacounda and Dakar. He was twelve years of age, Saukans later withdrew from the rally. Rally organisers decided that the final round would not be timed due to the incidents in the final few days that marred the rally.
34	(Chile) Roberto de la Cruz Vera Hernández	9 January 2009	Pejerreyes, Ovalle, Chile	displacement	n/a	Automobile
35	(Peru) Freddy Arucutipa Torres	9 January 2009	Pejerreyes, Ovalle, Chile	displacement	n/a	Automobile
During a displacement stage, a non-competing support truck of Argentinean Marcelo Fabián Sánchez, carrying tyres for the competitors, lost control and struck a car head-on at route D-43 which joins La Serena and Ovalle, killing two of its passengers instantly. The other two occupants of the car were taken to a hospital in Ovalle for treatment. Sánchez was detained for further questioning.
36	(Argentina) Natalia Sonia Gallardo	2 January 2010	Río Cuarto, Argentina	Colón—Córdoba	n/a	n/a
During the first stage of the rally, 28-year-old Natalia Gallardo was killed after she and a group of spectators were involved in an accident with the Desert Warrior 4×4 of Mirco Schultis and Ulrich Leardi, which had veered off course near the town of Río Cuarto, some 800 km (500 mi) from Buenos Aires. Four other fans were injured, two of whom were transferred to Córdoba for further treatment.
37	(Argentina) Marcelo Reales	13 January 2011	Catamarca, Argentina	Chilecito-San Juán	Toyota Hilux	Car
In stage 11, Eduardo Amor's Toyota Hilux went out-of-control and crashed with 42-year-old Marcelo Reales's car.
38	(Argentina) Luis Soldavini	January 2, 2012	Orense, Argentina	Santa Rosa-San Rafael	n/a	Light plane
39	(Argentina) Tomás Soldavini	January 2, 2012	Orense, Argentina	Santa Rosa-San Rafael	n/a	Light plane
In stage 2, their aircraft crashed while they were watching the race from the air. Luis was 37 and his son 11 years old.
40	(Peru) Unknown	11 January 2013	Tacna, Peru	-	Taxi	Automobile
41	(Peru) Unknown	11 January 2013	Tacna, Peru	-	Taxi	Automobile
Two Peruvian spectators were killed in a head-on collision road traffic accident between a Land Rover Defender support team vehicle and two taxis.
42	(Argentina) Agustín Ignacio Mina	10 January 2014	Northern Argentina	-	-	Automobile
43	(Argentina) Daniel Eduardo Ambrosio	10 January 2014	Northern Argentina	-	-	Automobile
Mina, a motorsports journalist, along with Ambrosio, died when their vehicle overturned.
44	(Bolivia) Máximo Riso	9 January 2016	near Uyuni, Bolivia	-	n/a	Automobile
A 65-year-old Bolivian spectator was killed after he was hit by a Mitsubishi vehicle driven by Frenchman Lionel Baud. The incident took place on the 82nd km of the Uyuni – Salta stage.
45	(Argentina) Unknown	12 January 2016	Córdoba, Argentina	-	n/a	Automobile
An Argentinian driver was killed in a traffic accident involving Lionel Baud's assistance vehicle. Baud's car was being transported to Buenos Aires in order to be shipped off to Europe after his retirement due to the fatal accident of a Bolivian spectator three days before.
46	(Italy) Livio Sassinotti	10 January 2023	Saudi Arabia	Riyadh–Haradh	n/a	?
During stage 9 of the 2023 rally, 69-year-old Livio Sassinotti was photographing behind a sand dune when truck driver Aleš Loprais collided with him. The spectator was evacuated by helicopter, but died before reaching a hospital. Loprais withdrew from the race after being informed of the news.
