= 2013 Dakar Rally =

Off-road motorsport event in Peru, Chile, and Argentina

Part of the Dakar Rally
← Previous event	Next event →
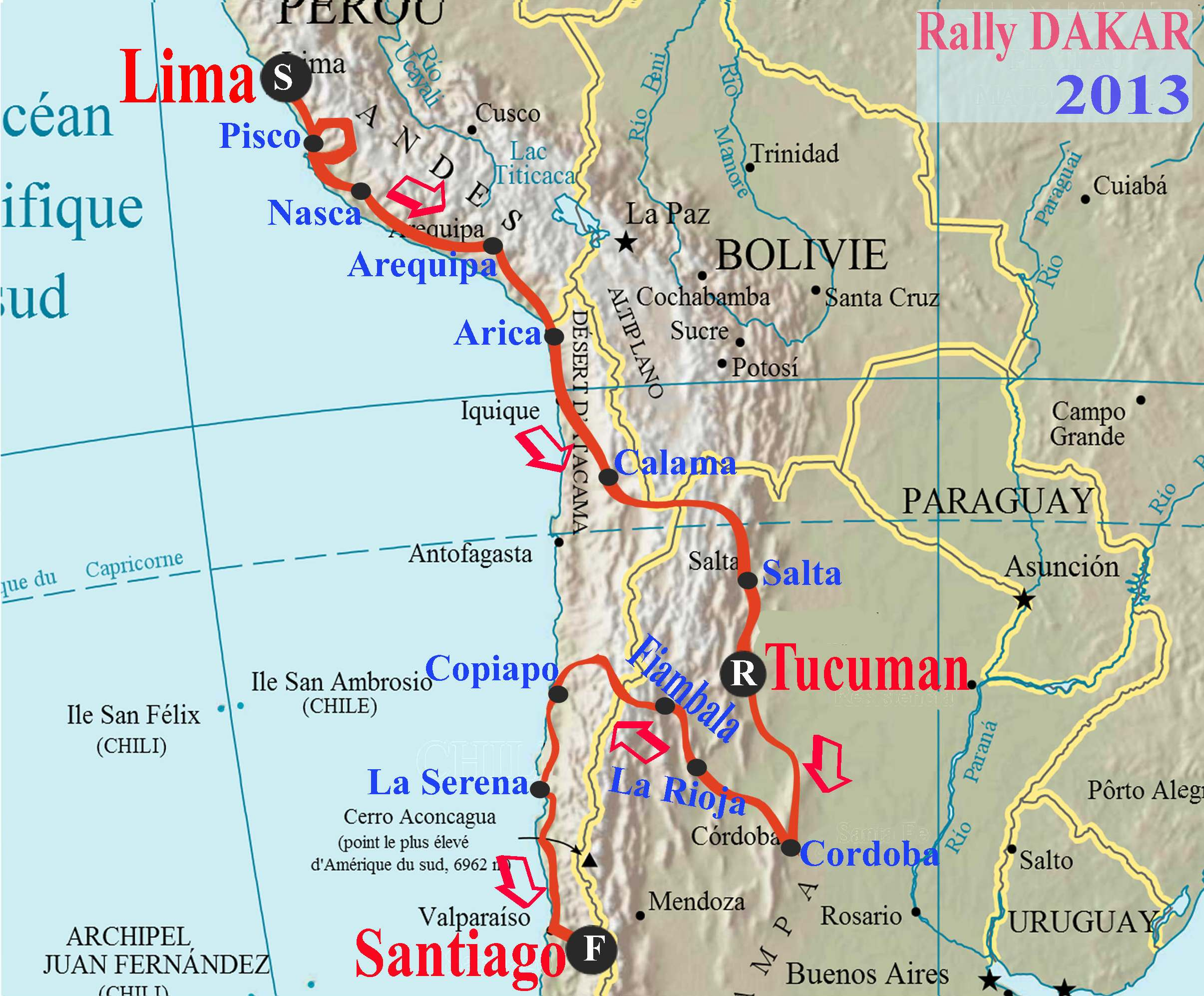
- Route of the rally across Peru, Chile and Argentina.
- Host country: Peru; Chile; Argentina
- Dates run: 5–19 January 2013
- Start: (Peru) Lima
- Finish: (Chile) Santiago
- Stages: 14

Results
- Cars winner: (France) Stéphane Peterhansel (France) Jean-Paul Cottret; Mini
- Bikes winner: (France) Cyril Despres; KTM
- Trucks winner: (Russia) Eduard Nikolaev; Kamaz
- Quads winner: (Argentina) Marcos Patronelli; Yamaha

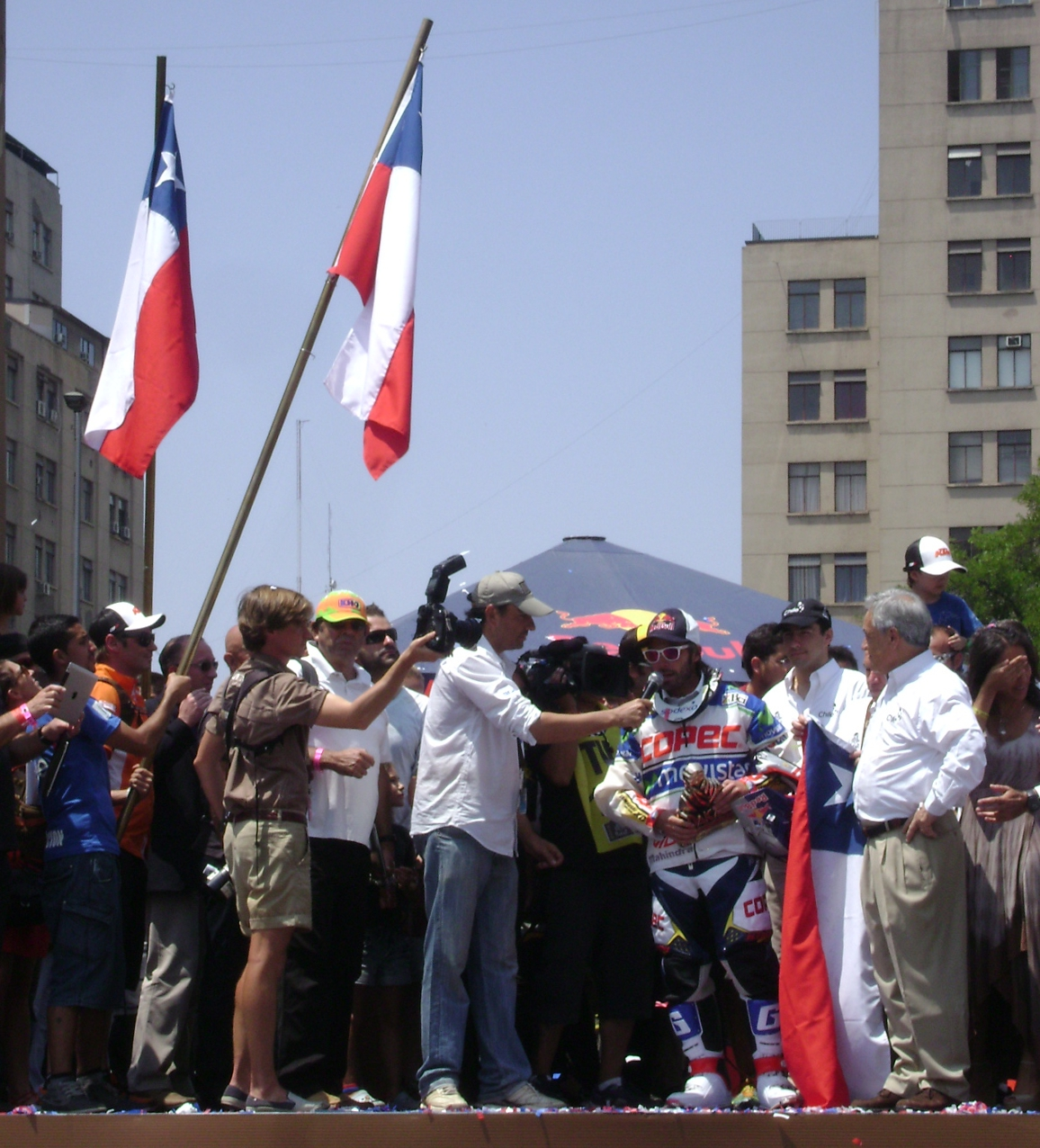
Francisco López Contardo, third in the motorcycle category, during the finish and award ceremony in Santiago.

The 2013 Dakar Rally was the 35th running of the event and the fifth successive year that the event was held in South America. The event started in Lima, Peru on 5 January and finished in Santiago, Chile on 19 January after fourteen stages of competition. 448 vehicles in four classes of competition started the event, which comprised a total distance of over 8,500 kilometres. The motorcycle category was won by French rider Cyril Despres for a fifth time, riding a KTM; Marcos Patronelli took his second win in the quad competition riding a Yamaha; Stéphane Peterhansel captured his eleventh Dakar victory in the car category alongside co-driver Jean-Paul Cottret at the wheel of a Mini; and Eduard Nikolaev's maiden victory re-captured the truck category title for Kamaz.

== Entries ==
The official entry list for the rally was published in November 2012.

=== Bikes ===
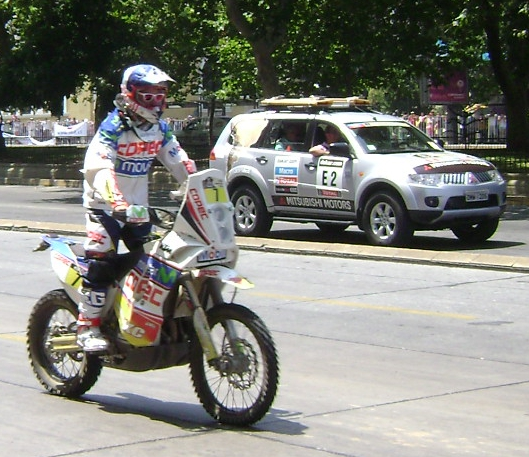
Francisco López Contardo during final stage

The entry list for the bike category would be headed by reigning champion Cyril Despres, who would spearhead the challenge of Austrian manufacturer KTM on board one of the Red Bull backed factory bikes. Absent however would be the Frenchman's long-time rival Marc Coma, who was forced to withdraw from the event due to a shoulder injury sustained whilst participating in Rally Morocco. The Spaniard was replaced by US rider Kurt Caselli, who would represent KTM's AMV team alongside Joan Pedrero. KTM would also be represented by Red Bull rider Ruben Faria, Francisco López and Pål Anders Ullevålseter among numerous others.

Yamaha would field factory bikes for 2007 runner-up David Casteu, Olivier Pain, David Frétigné and Frans Verhoeven. Honda would make their return to the event after a lengthy absence, with Portuguese rider Hélder Rodrigues leading the team's assault. Husqvarna meanwhile could count Spaniards Joan Barreda and Jordi Viladoms as well as Portugal's Paulo Gonçalves among their works riders.

=== Quads ===
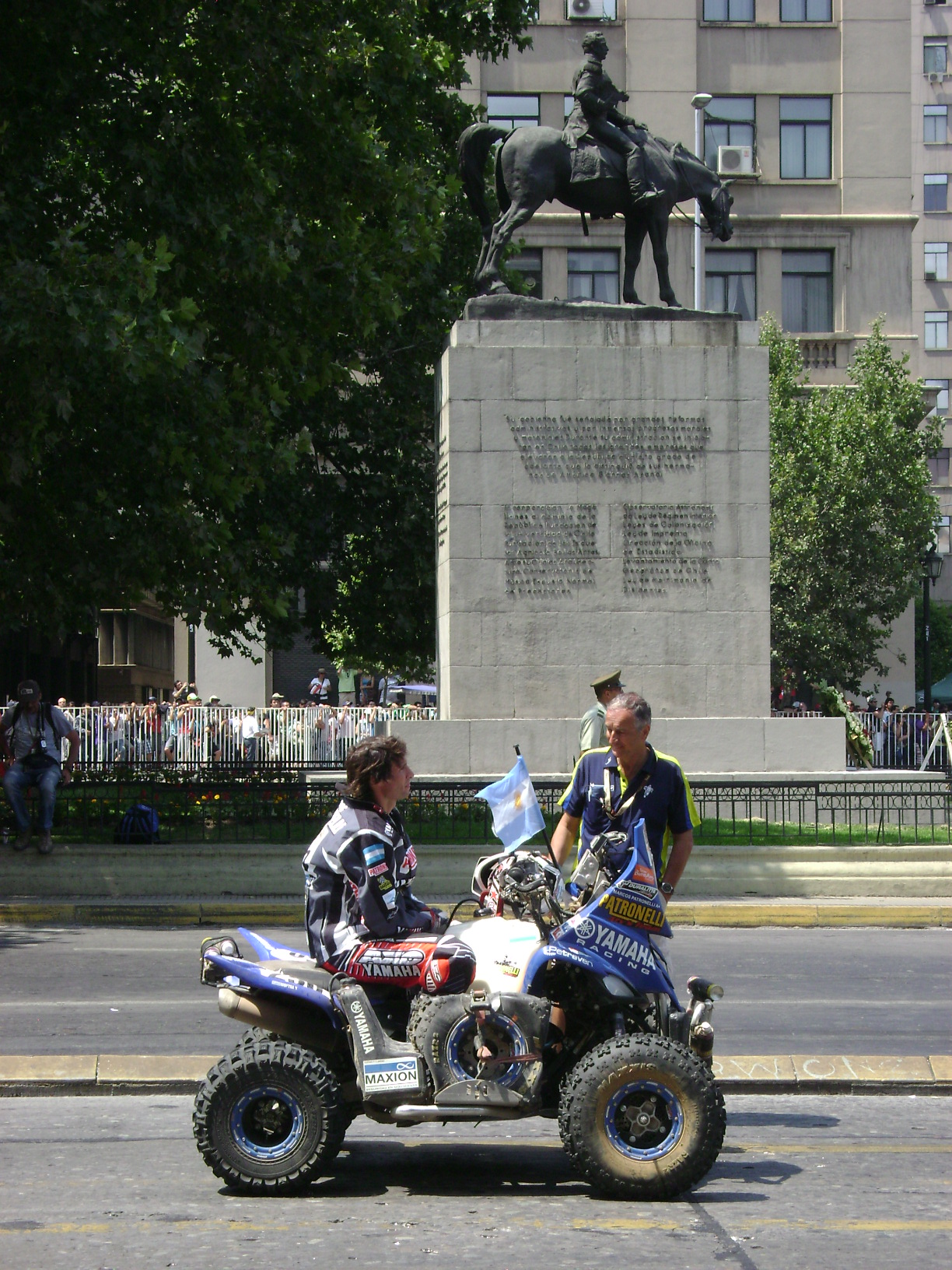
Marcos Patronelli after final stage

With defending champion Alejandro Patronelli opting not to return to defend his crown, his brother and 2010 winner Marcos Patronelli would be tasked with leading the Yamaha assault on the quad category. Fellow South American riders Tomas Maffei, Ignacio Casale and Sergio Lafuente would also be making use of Yamaha machinery.

Polish duo Łukasz Łaskawiec and Rafał Sonik, also riding for Yamaha, would also be expected to be in contention having both finished in the top three in previous years, with Dakar rookie Sebastian Husseini leading Honda's challenge for honours in the category.

=== Cars ===
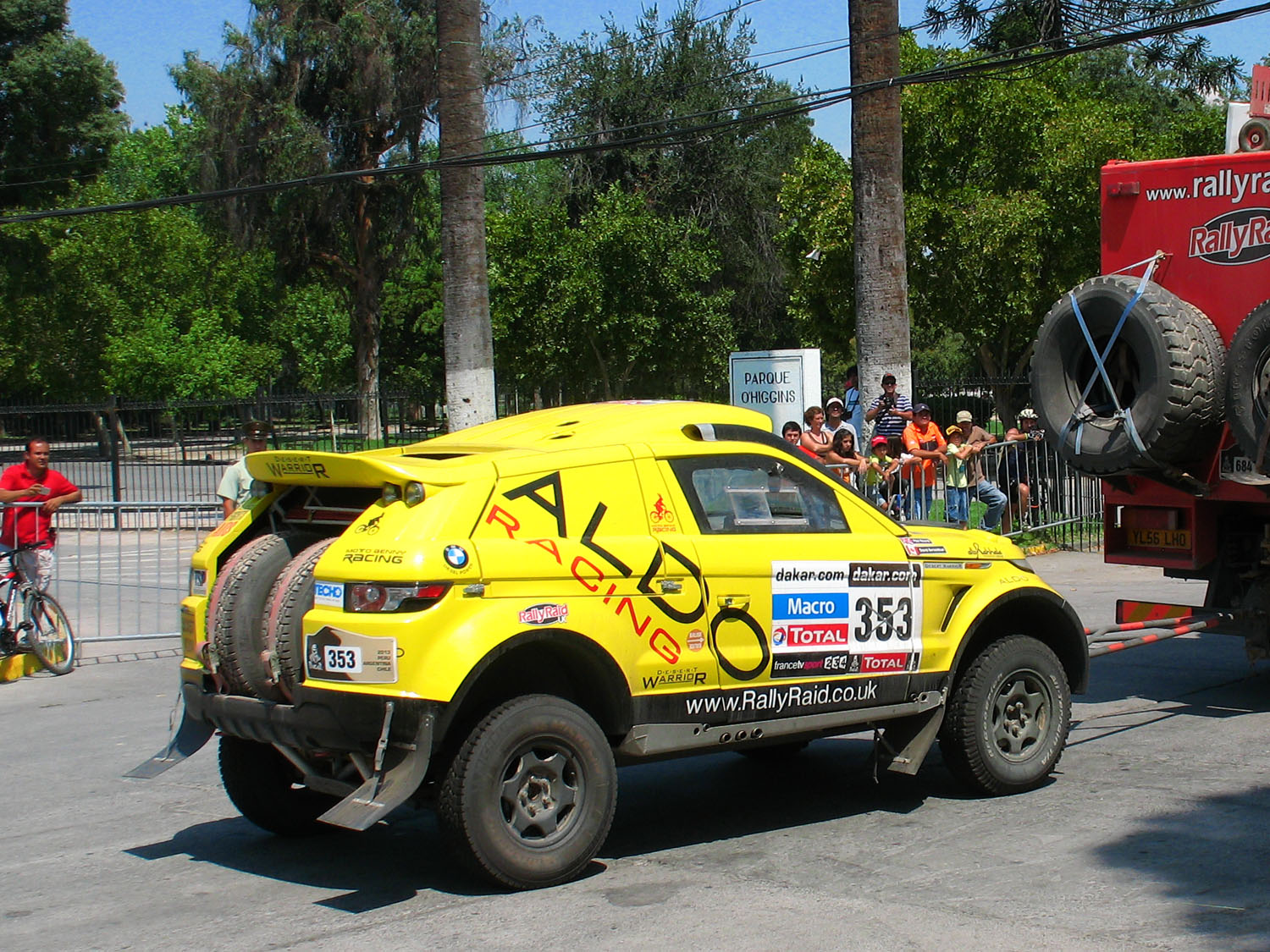
Desert Warrior 3 (Range Rover Evoque with BMW engine) of Canadian driver David Bensadoun

Ten-time Dakar winner Stéphane Peterhansel would return to defend his 2012 crown at the wheel of a Monster Energy-sponsored Mini All4 machine prepared by X-Raid. The German team would also enter similar machines for former motorcycle category winner Nani Roma, Leonid Novitskiy and Krzysztof Hołowczyc with Orlando Terranova driving an X-Raid prepared BMW X3.

Two former winners in the shape of Carlos Sainz (2010) and Nasser Al-Attiyah (2011) would drive a pair of Damen Jefferies-built buggies in an all-new team backed by Red Bull and the Qatari government. SMG would also return with their brace of buggies, with driving duties entrusted to Guerlain Chicherit, Ronan Chabot and Bernard Errandonea.

South African Toyota dealership Imperial Toyota would field a pair of Hilux machines for 2009 winner Giniel de Villiers and Duncan Vos, with the Japanese marque also represented by Overdrive's Lucio Alvarez and Peter van Merksteijn. The challenge of Chinese manufacturer Great Wall would be led by Carlos Sousa, whilst Robby Gordon as ever would be present in his self-run Hummer H3.

=== Trucks ===
After ending several years of Kamaz domination in the 2012 event, the Petronas-backed Iveco works team would return with reigning champion Gérard de Rooy, 2007 winner Hans Stacey and two-time World Rally champion Miki Biasion making up the driving strength.

Kamaz's trio of Red Bull sponsored trucks would be piloted by an all-Russian line-up of Eduard Nikolaev, Ayrat Mardeev and Andrey Karginov. Tatra's challenge would be headed by Czech driver Aleš Loprais, nephew of six-time champion Karel, while Dutchman Marcel van Vliet would lead the attack of German manufacturer MAN.

== Stages ==
Distance according to the official website.

Stage	Date	From	To	Class	Road Section		Special		Total		Stage winners			
Stage	Date	From	To	Class	km	mi	km	mi	km	mi	Bikes	Quads	Cars	Trucks
1	5 January	(Peru) Lima	(Peru) Pisco	All	250	156	13	8	263	164	(Chile) F. López	(Peru) I. Flores	(Spain) C. Sainz	(Netherlands) G. de Rooy
2	6 January	(Peru) Pisco	(Peru) Pisco	All	85	53	242	150	327	203	(Spain) J. Barreda	(Argentina) M. Patronelli	(France) S. Peterhansel	(Netherlands) G. de Rooy
3	7 January	(Peru) Pisco	(Peru) Nazca	All	100	62	243	151	343	213	(Chile) F. López	(Argentina) M. Patronelli	(Qatar) N. Al-Attiyah	(Netherlands) G. de Rooy
4	8 January	(Peru) Nazca	(Peru) Arequipa	Bikes	429	267	289	180	718	446	(Spain) J. Barreda	(Argentina) M. Patronelli	(Qatar) N. Al-Attiyah	(Russia) A. Mardeev
4	8 January	(Peru) Nazca	(Peru) Arequipa	Cars/Trucks	429	267	288	179	717	446	(Spain) J. Barreda	(Argentina) M. Patronelli	(Qatar) N. Al-Attiyah	(Russia) A. Mardeev
5	9 January	(Peru) Arequipa	(Chile) Arica	Bikes	275	171	136	85	411	255	(France) D. Casteu	(Argentina) M. Patronelli	(Spain) N. Roma	(Netherlands) H. Stacey
5	9 January	(Peru) Arequipa	(Chile) Arica	Cars/Trucks	337	209	172	107	509	316	(France) D. Casteu	(Argentina) M. Patronelli	(Spain) N. Roma	(Netherlands) H. Stacey
6	10 January	(Chile) Arica	(Chile) Calama	All	313	194	454	282	767	477	(Chile) F. López	(Chile) I. Casale	(Qatar) N. Al-Attiyah	(Netherlands) G. de Rooy
7	11 January	(Chile) Calama	(Argentina) Salta	Bikes	586	364	220	137	806	501	(United States) K. Caselli	(Chile) S. Palma	(France) S. Peterhansel	(Netherlands) G. de Rooy
7	11 January	(Chile) Calama	(Argentina) Salta	Cars/Trucks	534	332	220	137	754	469	(United States) K. Caselli	(Chile) S. Palma	(France) S. Peterhansel	(Netherlands) G. de Rooy
8	12 January	(Argentina) Salta	(Argentina) Tucumán	Bikes	274	170	491	305	738	459	(Spain) J. Barreda	(South Africa) S. van Biljon	(France) G. Chicherit	Stage cancelled^{1}
8	12 January	(Argentina) Salta	(Argentina) Tucumán	Cars	379	236	470	292	849	528	(Spain) J. Barreda	(South Africa) S. van Biljon	(France) G. Chicherit	Stage cancelled^{1}
8	12 January	(Argentina) Salta	(Argentina) Tucumán	Trucks	393	244	155	96	548	341	(Spain) J. Barreda	(South Africa) S. van Biljon	(France) G. Chicherit	Stage cancelled^{1}
	13 January	(Argentina) San Miguel de Tucumán		Rest day										
9	14 January	(Argentina) Tucumán	(Argentina) Córdoba	Bikes	259	161	593	368	852	529	(France) C. Despres	(Poland) Ł. Łaskawiec	(Spain) N. Roma	(Czech Republic) A. Loprais
9	14 January	(Argentina) Tucumán	(Argentina) Córdoba	Cars	258	160	593	368	851	529	(France) C. Despres	(Poland) Ł. Łaskawiec	(Spain) N. Roma	(Czech Republic) A. Loprais
9	14 January	(Argentina) Tucumán	(Argentina) Córdoba	Trucks	406	252	293	182	699	434	(France) C. Despres	(Poland) Ł. Łaskawiec	(Spain) N. Roma	(Czech Republic) A. Loprais
10	15 January	(Argentina) Córdoba	(Argentina) La Rioja	Bikes	279	173	357	222	636	395	(Spain) J. Barreda	(Poland) Ł. Łaskawiec	(Argentina) O. Terranova	(Russia) A. Karginov
10	15 January	(Argentina) Córdoba	(Argentina) La Rioja	Cars/Trucks	279	173	353	219	632	393	(Spain) J. Barreda	(Poland) Ł. Łaskawiec	(Argentina) O. Terranova	(Russia) A. Karginov
11	16 January	(Argentina) La Rioja	(Argentina) Fiambalá	Bikes	262	163	221	137	483	300	(United States) K. Caselli	(Australia) P. Smith	(United States) R. Gordon^{2}	(Netherlands) G. de Rooy^{2}
11	16 January	(Argentina) La Rioja	(Argentina) Fiambalá	Cars/Trucks	262	163	219	136	481	299	(United States) K. Caselli	(Australia) P. Smith	(United States) R. Gordon^{2}	(Netherlands) G. de Rooy^{2}
12	17 January	(Argentina) Fiambalá	(Chile) Copiapó	All	396	246	319	198	715	444	(Netherlands) F. Verhoeven	(Netherlands) S. Husseini	(Spain) N. Roma	(Russia) A. Karginov
13	18 January	(Chile) Copiapó	(Chile) La Serena	All	294	183	441	274	735	457	(Chile) F. López	(South Africa) S. van Biljon	(United States) R. Gordon	(Russia) A. Karginov
14	19 January	(Chile) La Serena	(Chile) Santiago	All	502	312	128	80	630	391	(Portugal) R. Faria^{3}	(South Africa) S. van Biljon	(Spain) N. Roma	(Netherlands) P. Versluis

Notes:

- ^1 — The first part of the timed section of Stage 8, including the entire special stage for the trucks, was cancelled due to flooding.
- ^2 — The stage for the cars and trucks was shortened due to flash floods after the stage commenced.
- ^3 — Though Francisco López set the fastest stage time, Ruben Faria was awarded the stage win due to a 15-minute engine change for the Chilean rider.

== Summary ==
=== Bikes ===
KTM rider Francisco López got his rally off to the best possible start by winning the opening stage, but Husqvarna's Joan Barreda took control of the overall standings by winning the second stage. The Spaniard however lost considerable time in the third stage with navigation problems, handing the lead to defending champion and works KTM rider Cyril Despres, who led by just under three minutes from stage winner López.

Despres however lost 17 minutes to stage winner Barreda during the fourth stage, handing the lead to Yamaha's Olivier Pain. The young French rider held the lead until the end of the seventh stage with some consistent stage times, but hit trouble during the eighth stage with a navigational error. This would mean Pain's teammate David Casteu, who won the fifth stage, headed into the rest day as leader of the overall standings.

More misfortune struck Yamaha however as Casteu struck a cow during the ninth stage, causing the Frenchman to dislocate his shoulder and retire from the rally. Despres was set to re-take the lead of the standings after winning the stage but dropped to second behind teammate Ruben Faria after taking a 15-minute penalty for an engine change. Despres nonetheless took the lead after finishing second during the tenth stage, with Faria losing 12 minutes to the leader during the eleventh stage.

Despite dropping eight minutes to Faria during the twelfth stage, Despres remained in control of the standings until the end of the rally, ending up with a winning margin of just under 11 minutes over Faria. López seemed set to threaten Despres after winning the penultimate stage and closing to within just over eight minutes of the Frenchman, an engine change penalty prior to the final stage cost him any chance of doing so. The Chilean would have to be content with third, nearly 19 minutes behind Despres despite taking the fastest time on the final stage, with Ivan Jakeš and Joan Pedrero completing an all-KTM top five.

Olivier Pain recovered to sixth position after his earlier troubles, whilst Barreda could do no better than 17th after losing considerable time with fuel pump issues on the fifth stage. Kurt Caselli had an impressive debut ride as a substitute for Marc Coma, winning two stages but finishing just outside the top 30 as a result of a navigational error during the eighth stage and engine woes in the penultimate stage.

=== Quads ===
Yamaha's Marcos Patronelli took control of the overall standings by winning the stage ahead of Honda newcomer Sebastian Husseini. The two riders finished 1st and 2nd for the next two stages, Patronelli extending his advantage to 15 minutes after the fourth stage, before mechanical problems for Husseini during the fifth stage cost him several hours. This gave Patronelli a lead of almost an hour and 20 minutes over Ignacio Casale, also aboard a Yamaha, who closed the gap slightly with a win on the sixth stage.

Patronelli however began to extend his advantage once more over the following stages, with Casale dropping 23 minutes during the eleventh stage. With a cushion of one hour 50 minutes, Patronelli maintained his advantage over Casale until the end of the rally. Rafał Sonik completed a Yamaha 1–2–3, albeit over three hours adrift of Patronelli.

Łukasz Łaskawiec briefly held third position after finishing second during the fifth stage, but delays in the sixth and twelfth stages dropped him to a final finishing position of 13th. Sarel van Biljon also held third in the overall standings after winning the eighth stage, but major delays during the following stage left the South African finishing outside the top 20.

=== Cars ===
Qatar Red Bull driver Carlos Sainz was the winner of the first stage, and despite losing twenty minutes to X-Raid's Stéphane Peterhansel during the second stage, the two-time World Rally champion was declared the leader of the overall classification having lost time trying to pass a waypoint due to a fault with his GPS. However, this decision was later reversed, handing the stage win and the lead of the standings back to Peterhansel.

The Frenchman's closest challenger initially would prove Sainz's teammate Nasser Al-Attiyah, who closed to within five minutes of Peterhansel following wins in the third and fourth stages. Victory in the sixth stage brought the Qatari within one minute 20 seconds of the rally lead, but an engine problem during the ninth stage put an end to his challenge. With Sainz having retired after the sixth stage, also because of engine problems, it was an event to forget for the newly formed Qatar Red Bull team.

This meant that Peterhansel now had a lead of 49 minutes over Imperial Toyota's Giniel de Villiers, the South African able only to erase seven minutes of that advantage during the remaining stages. In this period, a battle for third emerged between X-Raid drivers Nani Roma and Leonid Novitskiy, with the latter holding the advantage until the former won the twelfth stage. Novitskiy however re-gained the advantage after Roma stopped during the penultimate stage to allow Peterhansel to run in convoy with him, so as to ensure overall victory for his teammate. Roma eventually finished fourth, eight minutes behind Novitskiy. Roma's hopes of challenging Peterhansel for victory were negated when the Spaniard lost over an hour during the sixth stage as a result of becoming stuck in a dune. Orlando Terranova made it four X-Raid drivers in the top five having won the tenth stage.

It was a difficult rally for Robby Gordon, who finished only fourteenth overall despite a late pair of stage victories. The American had a transmission problem in the opening stage and rolled his Hummer in the fourth stage, leaving him trying to make up for lost time for the remainder of the rally. X-Raid driver Krzysztof Hołowczyc was eliminated from the running after the third stage having sustained back and rib injuries in a crash.

=== Trucks ===
Defending champion Gérard de Rooy took control of the event initially with victories in the first three stages for Iveco, building a seven-minute cushion over Tatra's Aleš Loprais. The Czech driver then took the lead of the overall standings after the fourth stage as de Rooy hit delays, but lost his advantage after becoming stuck in the sand during the following stage. This handed the lead of the rally back to de Rooy, who led by just over five minutes from Kamaz driver Eduard Nikolaev after the fifth stage.

The Dutchman extended this advantage to 22 minutes with back-to-back victories in the sixth and seventh stages, but disaster struck during the ninth stage – turbo failure, steering problems and a puncture conspired to drop de Rooy by nearly an hour. This gave Nikolaev the lead of the rally with 18 minutes in hand from Tatra's Martin Kolomy, though the Kamaz of Ayrat Mardeev would take second position after the eleventh stage and Andrey Karginov would move ahead of Kolomy into third position after victory in the twelfth stage.

Another victory in the penultimate stage allowed Karginov to move ahead of Mardeev, albeit some 36 minutes behind eventual victor Nikolaev. Karginov however lost out on the runner-up position during the final stage, with Mardeev doing just enough to clinch second by a margin of under a minute. Behind the all-Kamaz podium, de Rooy recovered to fourth position overall after winning the eleventh stage, 41 minutes behind Nikolaev, with Kolomy fifth and Loprais in sixth after his earlier troubles.

Miki Biasion ran third early on for Iveco, but was ruled out of contention after hitting severe delays during the fourth stage, going on to finish 13th overall. Former winner Hans Stacey meanwhile was forced to retire from the event after rolling his Iveco during the sixth stage.

== Stage results ==
Results according to the official website.

=== Bikes ===
	Stage result					General classification				
Stage	Pos	Competitor	Make	Time	Gap	Pos	Competitor	Make	Time	Gap
1	1	(Chile) Francisco López	KTM	39:15		1	(Chile) Francisco López	KTM	39:15	
1	2	(Netherlands) Frans Verhoeven	Yamaha	39:20	0:05	2	(Netherlands) Frans Verhoeven	Yamaha	39:20	0:05
1	3	(Chile) Pablo Quintanilla	Honda	39:40	0:25	3	(Chile) Pablo Quintanilla	Honda	39:40	0:25
2	1	(Spain) Joan Barreda	Husqvarna	2:42:31		1	(Spain) Joan Barreda	Husqvarna	3:24:11	
2	2	(Spain) Joan Pedrero	KTM	2:45:47	3:16	2	(Portugal) Ruben Faria	KTM	3:29:47	5:36
2	3	(Australia) Matt Fish	Husqvarna	2:48:24	5:53	3	(Spain) Joan Pedrero	KTM	3:30:47	6:36
3	1	(Chile) Francisco López	KTM	2:37:54		1	(France) Cyril Despres	KTM	6:15:03	
3	2	(Portugal) Paulo Gonçalves	Husqvarna	2:39:02	1:08	2	(Chile) Francisco López	KTM	6:17:54	2:51
3	3	(France) Cyril Despres	KTM	2:42:02	4:08	3	(Norway) Pål Anders Ullevålseter	KTM	6:20:02	4:59
4	1	(Spain) Joan Barreda	Husqvarna	3:41:09		1	(France) Olivier Pain	Yamaha	10:10:38	
4	2	(France) Olivier Pain	Yamaha	3:49:32	8:23	2	(France) David Casteu	Yamaha	10:13:02	2:24
4	3	(France) David Casteu	Yamaha	3:51:51	10:42	3	(France) Cyril Despres	KTM	10:13:47	3:09
5	1	(France) David Casteu	Yamaha	1:39:42		1	(France) Olivier Pain	Yamaha	11:51:29	
5	2	(France) Olivier Pain	Yamaha	1:40:51	1:09	2	(France) David Casteu	Yamaha	11:52:44	1:15
5	3	(Spain) Joan Pedrero	KTM	1:42:40	2:58	3	(France) Cyril Despres	KTM	11:57:36	6:07
6	1	(Chile) Francisco López	KTM	3:36:21		1	(France) Olivier Pain	Yamaha	15:35:23	
6	2	(Portugal) Ruben Faria	KTM	3:38:55	2:34	2	(France) Cyril Despres	KTM	15:37:45	2:22
6	3	(France) Cyril Despres	KTM	3:40:09	3:48	3	(France) David Casteu	Yamaha	15:40:11	4:48
7	1	(United States) Kurt Caselli	KTM	1:51:31		1	(France) Olivier Pain	Yamaha	17:28:17	
7	2	(Chile) Francisco López	KTM	1:52:54	1:23	2	(Chile) Francisco López	KTM	17:34:23	6:06
7	3	(France) Olivier Pain	Yamaha	1:52:54	1:23	3	(France) David Casteu	Yamaha	17:34:54	6:37
8	1	(Spain) Joan Barreda	Husqvarna	2:07:26		1	(France) David Casteu	Yamaha	19:56:33	
8	2	(United States) Johnny Campbell	Honda	2:14:30	7:04	2	(France) Cyril Despres	KTM	20:05:59	9:26
8	3	(Slovakia) Ivan Jakeš	KTM	2:15:23	7:57	3	(Portugal) Ruben Faria	KTM	20:07:49	11:16
9	1	(France) Cyril Despres	KTM	5:41:36		1	(Portugal) Ruben Faria	KTM	25:57:12	
9	2	(Spain) Joan Barreda	Husqvarna	5:45:39	5:03	2	(France) Cyril Despres	KTM	26:02:35^{1}	5:23
9	3	(Italy) Alessandro Botturi	Husqvarna	5:46:50	5:14	3	(Chile) Francisco López	KTM	26:06:15	9:03
10	1	(Spain) Joan Barreda	Husqvarna	4:43:14		1	(France) Cyril Despres	KTM	30:47:04	
10	2	(France) Cyril Despres	KTM	4:44:29	1:15	2	(Portugal) Ruben Faria	KTM	30:48:41	1:37
10	3	(Portugal) Paulo Gonçalves	Husqvarna	4:45:58	2:44	3	(Chile) Francisco López	KTM	31:00:45	13:41
11	1	(United States) Kurt Caselli	KTM	2:55:01		1	(France) Cyril Despres	KTM	33:48:29	
11	2	(Portugal) Paulo Gonçalves	Husqvarna	2:59:46	4:45	2	(Portugal) Ruben Faria	KTM	34:01:45	13:16
11	3	(France) Cyril Despres	KTM	3:01:25	6:24	3	(Chile) Francisco López	KTM	34:06:37	18:08
12	1	(Netherlands) Frans Verhoeven	Yamaha	3:49:15		1	(France) Cyril Despres	KTM	37:46:59	
12	2	(Portugal) Ruben Faria	KTM	3:50:53	1:38	2	(Portugal) Ruben Faria	KTM	37:52:38	5:39
12	3	(Spain) Joan Barreda	Husqvarna	3:52:16	3:01	3	(Chile) Francisco López	KTM	38:00:39	13:40
13	1	(Chile) Francisco López	KTM	3:44:54		1	(France) Cyril Despres	KTM	41:37:18	
13	2	(France) Cyril Despres	KTM	3:50:19	5:25	2	(Chile) Francisco López	KTM	41:45:33	8:15
13	3	(Portugal) Paulo Gonçalves	Husqvarna	3:50:23	5:29	3	(Portugal) Ruben Faria	KTM	41:51:59	14:41
14	1	(Portugal) Ruben Faria	KTM	1:43:06		1	(France) Cyril Despres	KTM	43:24:22	
14	2	(Spain) Joan Barreda	Husqvarna	1:43:14	0:08	2	(Portugal) Ruben Faria	KTM	43:35:05	10:43
14	3	(Portugal) Hélder Rodrigues	Honda	1:43:30	0:24	3	(Chile) Francisco López	KTM	43:43:10	18:48

Notes:

- ^1 — Includes a 15-minute penalty for an engine change; this does not affect Despres' status as winner of Stage 9.

=== Quads ===
	Stage result					General classification				
Stage	Pos	Competitor	Make	Time	Gap	Pos	Competitor	Make	Time	Gap
1	1	(Peru) Ignacio Flores	Yamaha	46:50		1	(Peru) Ignacio Flores	Yamaha	46:50	
1	2	(Netherlands) Sebastian Husseini	Honda	47:45	0:55	2	(Netherlands) Sebastian Husseini	Honda	47:45	0:55
1	3	(Argentina) Marcos Patronelli	Yamaha	48:05	1:15	3	(Argentina) Marcos Patronelli	Yamaha	48:05	1:15
2	1	(Argentina) Marcos Patronelli	Yamaha	3:02:40		1	(Argentina) Marcos Patronelli	Yamaha	3:50:45	
2	2	(Netherlands) Sebastian Husseini	Honda	3:03:46	1:06	2	(Netherlands) Sebastian Husseini	Honda	3:51:31	0:46
2	3	(Chile) Ignacio Casale	Yamaha	3:11:34	8:54	3	(Chile) Ignacio Casale	Yamaha	4:00:04	9:19
3	1	(Argentina) Marcos Patronelli	Yamaha	3:04:55		1	(Argentina) Marcos Patronelli	Yamaha	6:55:40	
3	2	(Netherlands) Sebastian Husseini	Honda	3:08:27	3:32	2	(Netherlands) Sebastian Husseini	Honda	6:59:58	4:18
3	3	(Poland) Rafał Sonik	Yamaha	3:20:39	15:44	3	(Chile) Ignacio Casale	Yamaha	7:25:18	29:38
4	1	(Argentina) Marcos Patronelli	Yamaha	4:25:46		1	(Argentina) Marcos Patronelli	Yamaha	11:21:26	
4	2	(Netherlands) Sebastian Husseini	Honda	4:35:34	9:48	2	(Netherlands) Sebastian Husseini	Honda	11:35:32	14:06
4	3	(Poland) Łukasz Łaskawiec	Yamaha	4:41:31	15:45	3	(Poland) Rafał Sonik	Yamaha	12:21:43	1:00:17
5	1	(Argentina) Marcos Patronelli	Yamaha	1:59:30		1	(Argentina) Marcos Patronelli	Yamaha	13:20:56	
5	2	(Poland) Łukasz Łaskawiec	Yamaha	2:02:30	3:00	2	(Chile) Ignacio Casale	Yamaha	14:39:28	1:18:32
5	3	(Chile) Ignacio Casale	Yamaha	2:13:44	14:14	3	(Poland) Łukasz Łaskawiec	Yamaha	14:41:41	1:20:45
6	1	(Chile) Ignacio Casale	Yamaha	4:15:21		1	(Argentina) Marcos Patronelli	Yamaha	17:42:53	
6	2	(Argentina) Marcos Patronelli	Yamaha	4:21:57	6:36	2	(Chile) Ignacio Casale	Yamaha	18:54:49	1:11:56
6	3	(South Africa) Sarel van Biljon	E-ATV	4:25:51	10:30	3	(Poland) Rafał Sonik	Yamaha	19:30:53	1:48:00
7	1	(Chile) Sebastián Palma	Can-Am	2:25:06		1	(Argentina) Marcos Patronelli	Yamaha	20:08:33	
7	2	(Argentina) Marcos Patronelli	Yamaha	2:25:40	0:34	2	(Chile) Ignacio Casale	Yamaha	21:23:03	1:14:30
7	3	(South Africa) Sarel van Biljon	E-ATV	2:25:44	0:38	3	(Poland) Rafał Sonik	Yamaha	21:59:19	1:50:46
8	1	(South Africa) Sarel van Biljon	E-ATV	2:28:13		1	(Argentina) Marcos Patronelli	Yamaha	22:38:35	
8	2	(Argentina) Marcos Patronelli	Yamaha	2:30:02	1:49	2	(Chile) Ignacio Casale	Yamaha	24:02:30	1:23:55
8	3	(Chile) Sebastián Palma	Can-Am	2:30:49	2:36	3	(South Africa) Sarel van Biljon	E-ATV	24:39:04	2:00:29
9	1	(Poland) Łukasz Łaskawiec	Yamaha	6:26:39		1	(Argentina) Marcos Patronelli	Yamaha	29:06:19	
9	2	(Argentina) Marcos Patronelli	Yamaha	6:27:44	1:05	2	(Chile) Ignacio Casale	Yamaha	30:08:47	1:32:28
9	3	(Netherlands) Sebastien Husseini	Honda	2:30:49	2:36	3	(Poland) Rafał Sonik	Yamaha	31:15:03	2:08:44
10	1	(Poland) Łukasz Łaskawiec	Yamaha	5:19:12		1	(Argentina) Marcos Patronelli	Yamaha	34:31:47	
10	2	(Chile) Ignacio Casale	Yamaha	5:20:47	1:35	2	(Chile) Ignacio Casale	Yamaha	35:59:34	1:27:47
10	3	(Poland) Rafał Sonik	Yamaha	5:22:35	3:23	3	(Poland) Rafał Sonik	Yamaha	36:37:38	2:05:51
11	1	(Australia) Paul Smith	Honda	3:46:04		1	(Argentina) Marcos Patronelli	Yamaha	38:23:33	
11	2	(Argentina) Marcos Patronelli	Yamaha	3:51:46	5:42	2	(Chile) Ignacio Casale	Yamaha	40:13:55	1:50:22
11	3	(Argentina) Gastón González^{1}	Yamaha	3:55:22	9:18	3	(Poland) Rafał Sonik	Yamaha	41:10:32	2:46:59
12	1	(Netherlands) Sebastian Husseini	Honda	4:36:54		1	(Argentina) Marcos Patronelli	Yamaha	43:01:35	
12	2	(Argentina) Marcos Patronelli	Yamaha	4:38:02	1:08	2	(Chile) Ignacio Casale	Yamaha	44:54:10	1:52:35
12	3	(Chile) Ignacio Casale	Yamaha	4:40:15	3:21	3	(Poland) Rafał Sonik	Yamaha	46:05:55	3:04:20
13	1	(South Africa) Sarel van Biljon	E-ATV	4:42:45		1	(Argentina) Marcos Patronelli	Yamaha	47:47:19	
13	2	(Netherlands) Sebastian Husseini	Honda	4:43:26	0:41	2	(Chile) Ignacio Casale	Yamaha	49:37:43	1:50:24
13	3	(Chile) Ignacio Casale	Yamaha	4:43:33	0:48	3	(Poland) Rafał Sonik	Yamaha	51:02:02	3:14:43
14	1	(South Africa) Sarel van Biljon	E-ATV	1:54:05		1	(Argentina) Marcos Patronelli	Yamaha	49:42:42	
14	2	(Netherlands) Sebastian Husseini	Honda	1:54:42	0:37	2	(Chile) Ignacio Casale	Yamaha	51:33:17	1:50:35
14	3	(Argentina) Marcos Patronelli	Yamaha	1:55:23	1:18	3	(Poland) Rafał Sonik	Yamaha	52:59:31	3:16:49

Notes:

- ^1 — González's time includes a five-minute penalty.

=== Cars ===
	Stage result					General classification				
Stage	Pos	Competitor	Make	Time	Gap	Pos	Competitor	Make	Time	Gap
1	1	(Spain) Carlos Sainz (Germany) Timo Gottschalk	Demon Jefferies	23:00		1	(Spain) Carlos Sainz (Germany) Timo Gottschalk	Demon Jefferies	23:00	
1	2	(Argentina) Lucio Alvarez (Argentina) Bernardo Graue	Toyota	23:24	0:24	2	(Argentina) Lucio Alvarez (Argentina) Bernardo Graue	Toyota	23:24	0:24
1	3	(France) Guerlain Chicherit (France) Jean-Pierre Garcin	SMG	23:30	0:30	3	(France) Guerlain Chicherit (France) Jean-Pierre Garcin	SMG	23:30	0:30
2^{1}	1	(France) Stéphane Peterhansel (France) Jean-Paul Cottret	Mini	2:35:38		1	(France) Stéphane Peterhansel (France) Jean-Paul Cottret	Mini	3:00:20	
2^{1}	2	(South Africa) Giniel de Villiers (Germany) Dirk von Zitzewitz	Toyota	2:38:13	2:35	2	(South Africa) Giniel de Villiers (Germany) Dirk von Zitzewitz	Toyota	3:02:58	2:38
2^{1}	3	(France) Ronan Chabot (France) Gilles Pillot	SMG	2:40:30	4:52	3	(France) Ronan Chabot (France) Gilles Pillot	SMG	3:04:06	3:46
3	1	(Qatar) Nasser Al-Attiyah (Spain) Lucas Cruz	Demon Jefferies	2:30:14		1	(France) Stéphane Peterhansel (France) Jean-Paul Cottret	Mini	5:34:26	
3	2	(United States) Robby Gordon (United States) Kellon Walch	Hummer	2:31:32	1:18	2	(Qatar) Nasser Al-Attiyah (Spain) Lucas Cruz	Demon Jefferies	5:40:59	6:33
3	3	(France) Stéphane Peterhansel (France) Jean-Paul Cottret	Mini	2:34:06	3:52	3	(Argentina) Lucio Alvarez (Argentina) Bernardo Graue	Toyota	5:52:37	18:11
4	1	(Qatar) Nasser Al-Attiyah (Spain) Lucas Cruz	Demon Jefferies	3:28:46		1	(France) Stéphane Peterhansel (France) Jean-Paul Cottret	Mini	9:04:29	
4	2	(France) Guerlain Chicherit (France) Jean-Pierre Garcin	SMG	3:29:22	0:36	2	(Qatar) Nasser Al-Attiyah (Spain) Lucas Cruz	Demon Jefferies	9:09:45	5:16
4	3	(France) Stéphane Peterhansel (France) Jean-Paul Cottret	Mini	3:30:03	1:17	3	(South Africa) Giniel de Villiers (Germany) Dirk von Zitzewitz	Toyota	9:37:51	33:22
5	1	(Spain) Nani Roma (France) Michel Périn	Mini	1:49:40		1	(France) Stéphane Peterhansel (France) Jean-Paul Cottret	Mini	10:55:32	
5	2	(France) Stéphane Peterhansel (France) Jean-Paul Cottret	Mini	1:51:03	1:23	2	(Qatar) Nasser Al-Attiyah (Spain) Lucas Cruz	Demon Jefferies	11:05:26	9:54
5	3	(United States) Robby Gordon (United States) Kellon Walch	Hummer	1:51:21	1:41	3	(South Africa) Giniel de Villiers (Germany) Dirk von Zitzewitz	Toyota	11:29:22	33:50
6	1	(Qatar) Nasser Al-Attiyah (Spain) Lucas Cruz	Demon Jefferies	3:32:08		1	(France) Stéphane Peterhansel (France) Jean-Paul Cottret	Mini	14:36:16	
6	2	(France) Stéphane Peterhansel (France) Jean-Paul Cottret	Mini	3:40:44	8:36	2	(Qatar) Nasser Al-Attiyah (Spain) Lucas Cruz	Demon Jefferies	14:37:34	1:18
6	3	(United States) Robby Gordon (United States) Kellon Walch	Hummer	3:46:00	13:52	3	(South Africa) Giniel de Villiers (Germany) Dirk von Zitzewitz	Toyota	15:18:47	42:31
7	1	(France) Stéphane Peterhansel (France) Jean-Paul Cottret	Mini	1:47:27		1	(France) Stéphane Peterhansel (France) Jean-Paul Cottret	Mini	16:23:43	
7	2	(France) Guerlain Chicherit (France) Jean-Pierre Garcin	SMG	1:48:06	0:39	2	(Qatar) Nasser Al-Attiyah (Spain) Lucas Cruz	Demon Jefferies	16:26:57	3:14
7	3	(United States) Robby Gordon (United States) Kellon Walch	Hummer	1:48:35	1:08	3	(South Africa) Giniel de Villiers (Germany) Dirk von Zitzewitz	Toyota	17:07:46	44:03
8^{2}	1	(France) Guerlain Chicherit (France) Jean-Pierre Garcin	SMG	1:55:06		1	(France) Stéphane Peterhansel (France) Jean-Paul Cottret	Mini	18:31:04	
8^{2}	2	(Argentina) Orlando Terranova (Portugal) Paulo Fiuza	BMW	1:59:08	4:02	2	(Qatar) Nasser Al-Attiyah (Spain) Lucas Cruz	Demon Jefferies	18:34:18	3:14
8^{2}	3	(United States) Robby Gordon (United States) Kellon Walch	Hummer	2:00:23	5:17	3	(South Africa) Giniel de Villiers (Germany) Dirk von Zitzewitz	Toyota	19:15:07	44:03
9	1	(Spain) Nani Roma (France) Michel Périn	Mini	5:36:28		1	(France) Stéphane Peterhansel (France) Jean-Paul Cottret	Mini	24:11:43	
9	2	(France) Stéphane Peterhansel (France) Jean-Paul Cottret	Mini	5:40:39	4:11	2	(South Africa) Giniel de Villiers (Germany) Dirk von Zitzewitz	Toyota	25:01:14	49:31
9	3	(Argentina) Orlando Terranova (Portugal) Paulo Fiuza	BMW	5:43:22	6:54	3	(Russia) Leonid Novitskiy (Russia) Konstantin Zhiltsov	Mini	25:07:46	56:03
10	1	(Argentina) Orlando Terranova (Portugal) Paulo Fiuza	BMW	3:57:58		1	(France) Stéphane Peterhansel (France) Jean-Paul Cottret	Mini	28:12:00	
10	2	(Spain) Nani Roma (France) Michel Périn	Mini	4:00:05	2:07	2	(South Africa) Giniel de Villiers (Germany) Dirk von Zitzewitz	Toyota	29:04:38	52:38
10	3	(France) Stéphane Peterhansel (France) Jean-Paul Cottret	Mini	4:00:17	2:19	3	(Russia) Leonid Novitskiy (Russia) Konstantin Zhiltsov	Mini	29:20:40	1:08:40
11	1	(United States) Robby Gordon (United States) Kellon Walch	Hummer	50:51		1	(France) Stéphane Peterhansel (France) Jean-Paul Cottret	Mini	29:07:25	
11	2	(France) Ronan Chabot (France) Gilles Pillot	SMG	51:29	0:38	2	(South Africa) Giniel de Villiers (Germany) Dirk von Zitzewitz	Toyota	29:59:24	51:59
11	3	(Argentina) Lucio Alvarez (Argentina) Bernardo Graue	Toyota	52:38	1:47	3	(Russia) Leonid Novitskiy (Russia) Konstantin Zhiltsov	Mini	30:33:05	1:25:40
12	1	(Spain) Nani Roma (France) Michel Périn	Mini	3:36:34		1	(France) Stéphane Peterhansel (France) Jean-Paul Cottret	Mini	32:50:02	
12	2	(United States) Robby Gordon (United States) Kellon Walch	Hummer	3:40:52	4:18	2	(South Africa) Giniel de Villiers (Germany) Dirk von Zitzewitz	Toyota	33:40:23	50:21
12	3	(South Africa) Giniel de Villiers (Germany) Dirk von Zitzewitz	Toyota	3:40:59	4:25	3	(Spain) Nani Roma (France) Michel Périn	Mini	34:21:08	1:31:06
13	1	(United States) Robby Gordon (United States) Kellon Walch	Hummer	3:40:53		1	(France) Stéphane Peterhansel (France) Jean-Paul Cottret	Mini	36:44:46	
13	2	(France) Guerlain Chicherit (France) Jean-Pierre Garcin	SMG	3:41:15	0:22	2	(South Africa) Giniel de Villiers (Germany) Dirk von Zitzewitz	Toyota	37:29:24	44:38
13	3	(Argentina) Orlando Terranova (Portugal) Paulo Fiuza	BMW	3:45:34	4:41	3	(Russia) Leonid Novitskiy (Russia) Konstantin Zhiltsov	Mini	38:14:17	1:29:31
14	1	(Spain) Nani Roma (France) Michel Périn	Mini	1:44:10		1	(France) Stéphane Peterhansel (France) Jean-Paul Cottret	Mini	38:32:39	
14	2	(Argentina) Orlando Terranova (Portugal) Paulo Fiuza	BMW	1:44:23	0:13	2	(South Africa) Giniel de Villiers (Germany) Dirk von Zitzewitz	Toyota	39:15:01	42:22
14	3	(Argentina) Lucio Alvarez (Argentina) Bernardo Graue	Toyota	1:44:41	0:31	3	(Russia) Leonid Novitskiy (Russia) Konstantin Zhiltsov	Mini	40:01:01	1:28:22

Notes:

- ^1 — Carlos Sainz and Timo Gottschalk were initially retroactively recognised as the winners of the second stage after a problem with Global Positioning System satellites used by rally organisers meant that the timing system did not register their passing a waypoint on the stage, and they lost twenty minutes trying to pass the marker. After further investigation however, the race officials decided to reverse this decision, handing the stage win back to Stéphane Peterhansel and Jean-Paul Cottret.
- ^2 — A swollen riverbed during Stage 8 meant that only five cars were able to reach the end of the stage. As a result, all competitors who failed to make the finish were awarded the same time as Stéphane Peterhansel and Jean-Paul Cottret, meaning the gaps between the leaders in the overall classification did not change.

=== Trucks ===
	Stage result					General classification				
Stage	Pos	Competitor	Make	Time	Gap	Pos	Competitor	Make	Time	Gap
1	1	(Netherlands) Gérard de Rooy (Belgium) Tom Colsoul (Netherlands) Darek Rodewald	Iveco	26:18		1	(Netherlands) Gérard de Rooy (Belgium) Tom Colsoul (Netherlands) Darek Rodewald	Iveco	26:18	
1	2	(Netherlands) Hans Stacey (Germany) Detlef Ruf (Netherlands) Bernard der Kinderen	Iveco	27:06	0:48	2	(Netherlands) Hans Stacey (Germany) Detlef Ruf (Netherlands) Bernard der Kinderen	Iveco	27:06	0:48
1	3	(Czech Republic) Aleš Loprais (Belgium) Serge Bruynkens (Czech Republic) Radim Pustějovský	Tatra	27:33	1:15	3	(Czech Republic) Aleš Loprais (Belgium) Serge Bruynkens (Czech Republic) Radim Pustějovský	Tatra	27:33	1:15
2	1	(Netherlands) Gérard de Rooy (Belgium) Tom Colsoul (Netherlands) Darek Rodewald	Iveco	3:00:59		1	(Netherlands) Gérard de Rooy (Belgium) Tom Colsoul (Netherlands) Darek Rodewald	Iveco	3:27:17	
2	2	(Czech Republic) Aleš Loprais (Belgium) Serge Bruynkens (Czech Republic) Radim Pustějovský	Tatra	3:02:00	1:01	2	(Czech Republic) Aleš Loprais (Belgium) Serge Bruynkens (Czech Republic) Radim Pustějovský	Tatra	3:29:33	2:16
2	3	(Italy) Miki Biasion (Italy) Humberto Fiori (Netherlands) Michel Huisman	Iveco	3:08:51	7:52	3	(Italy) Miki Biasion (Italy) Humberto Fiori (Netherlands) Michel Huisman	Iveco	3:38:12	10:55
3	1	(Netherlands) Gérard de Rooy (Belgium) Tom Colsoul (Netherlands) Darek Rodewald	Iveco	2:55:58		1	(Netherlands) Gérard de Rooy (Belgium) Tom Colsoul (Netherlands) Darek Rodewald	Iveco	6:23:15	
3	2	(Russia) Eduard Nikolaev (Russia) Sergey Savostin (Russia) Vladimir Rybakov	Kamaz	2:57:22	1:24	2	(Czech Republic) Aleš Loprais (Belgium) Serge Bruynkens (Czech Republic) Radim Pustějovský	Tatra	6:30:14	6:59
3	3	(Italy) Miki Biasion (Italy) Humberto Fiori (Netherlands) Michel Huisman	Iveco	2:58:29	2:31	3	(Italy) Miki Biasion (Italy) Humberto Fiori (Netherlands) Michel Huisman	Iveco	6:36:41	13:26
4	1	(Russia) Ayrat Mardeev (Russia) Aydar Belyaev (Russia) Anton Mirniy	Kamaz	4:04:59		1	(Czech Republic) Aleš Loprais (Belgium) Serge Bruynkens (Czech Republic) Radim Pustějovský	Tatra	10:53:41	
4	2	(Russia) Andrey Karginov (Russia) Igor Devyatkin (Russia) Andrey Mokeev	Kamaz	4:08:32	3:33	2	(Netherlands) Gérard de Rooy (Belgium) Tom Colsoul (Netherlands) Darek Rodewald	Iveco	10:54:37	0:56
4	3	(Netherlands) Hans Stacey (Germany) Detlef Ruf (Netherlands) Bernard der Kinderen	Iveco	4:11:21	6:22	3	(Russia) Eduard Nikolaev (Russia) Sergey Savostin (Russia) Vladimir Rybakov	Kamaz	11:00:49	7:08
5	1	(Netherlands) Hans Stacey (Germany) Detlef Ruf (Netherlands) Bernard der Kinderen	Iveco	2:07:34		1	(Netherlands) Gérard de Rooy (Belgium) Tom Colsoul (Netherlands) Darek Rodewald	Iveco	13:04:43	
5	2	(Russia) Eduard Nikolaev (Russia) Sergey Savostin (Russia) Vladimir Rybakov	Kamaz	2:09:27	1:53	2	(Russia) Eduard Nikolaev (Russia) Sergey Savostin (Russia) Vladimir Rybakov	Kamaz	13:10:16	5:33
5	3	(Netherlands) Gérard de Rooy (Belgium) Tom Colsoul (Netherlands) Darek Rodewald	Iveco	2:10:06	2:32	3	(Russia) Ayrat Mardeev (Russia) Aydar Belyaev (Russia) Anton Mirniy	Kamaz	13:21:49	17:06
6	1	(Netherlands) Gérard de Rooy (Belgium) Tom Colsoul (Netherlands) Darek Rodewald	Iveco	4:19:02		1	(Netherlands) Gérard de Rooy (Belgium) Tom Colsoul (Netherlands) Darek Rodewald	Iveco	17:23:45	
6	2	(Russia) Andrey Karginov (Russia) Igor Devyatkin (Russia) Andrey Mokeev	Kamaz	4:19:36	0:34	2	(Russia) Eduard Nikolaev (Russia) Sergey Savostin (Russia) Vladimir Rybakov	Kamaz	17:42:25	18:40
6	3	(Netherlands) Peter Versluis (Netherlands) Harry Schuurmans (Belgium) Jurgen Damen	MAN	4:19:37	0:35	3	(Russia) Ayrat Mardeev (Russia) Aydar Belyaev (Russia) Anton Mirniy	Kamaz	17:54:17	30:22
7	1	(Netherlands) Gérard de Rooy (Belgium) Tom Colsoul (Netherlands) Darek Rodewald	Iveco	2:02:21		1	(Netherlands) Gérard de Rooy (Belgium) Tom Colsoul (Netherlands) Darek Rodewald	Iveco	19:26:06	
7	2	(Czech Republic) Aleš Loprais (Belgium) Serge Bruynkens (Czech Republic) Radim Pustějovský	Tatra	2:03:30	1:09	2	(Russia) Eduard Nikolaev (Russia) Sergey Savostin (Russia) Vladimir Rybakov	Kamaz	19:48:14	22:08
7	3	(Russia) Andrey Karginov (Russia) Igor Devyatkin (Russia) Andrey Mokeev	Kamaz	2:03:59	1:38	3	(Czech Republic) Martin Kolomy (Czech Republic) René Kilian (Czech Republic) David Kilian	Tatra	20:07:31	41:25
8	Stage cancelled due to flooding									
9	1	(Czech Republic) Aleš Loprais (Belgium) Serge Bruynkens (Czech Republic) Radim Pustějovský	Tatra	3:18:32		1	(Russia) Eduard Nikolaev (Russia) Sergey Savostin (Russia) Vladimir Rybakov	Kamaz	23:10:20	
9	2	(Netherlands) Peter Versluis (Netherlands) Harry Schuurmans (Belgium) Jurgen Damen	MAN	3:18:39	0:07	2	(Czech Republic) Martin Kolomy (Czech Republic) René Kilian (Czech Republic) David Kilian	Tatra	23:28:16	17:56
9	3	(Russia) Andrey Karginov (Russia) Igor Devyatkin (Russia) Andrey Mokeev	Kamaz	3:20:08	1:36	3	(Russia) Ayrat Mardeev (Russia) Aydar Belyaev (Russia) Anton Mirniy	Kamaz	23:43:52	33:32
10	1	(Russia) Andrey Karginov (Russia) Igor Devyatkin (Russia) Andrey Mokeev	Kamaz	4:44:08		1	(Russia) Eduard Nikolaev (Russia) Sergey Savostin (Russia) Vladimir Rybakov	Kamaz	27:59:31	
10	2	(Netherlands) Peter van den Bosch (Netherlands) Patrick Bouw (Netherlands) Wouter Rosegaar	DAF	4:47:47	3:39	2	(Czech Republic) Martin Kolomy (Czech Republic) René Kilian (Czech Republic) David Kilian	Tatra	28:31:54	32:23
10	3	(Netherlands) Martin van den Brink (Belgium) Peter Willemsen (Netherlands) Arjan Veenvliet	GINAF	4:48:20	4:12	3	(Russia) Ayrat Mardeev (Russia) Aydar Belyaev (Russia) Anton Mirniy	Kamaz	28:33:41	34:10
11	1	(Netherlands) Gérard de Rooy (Belgium) Tom Colsoul (Netherlands) Darek Rodewald	Iveco	54:47		1	(Russia) Eduard Nikolaev (Russia) Sergey Savostin (Russia) Vladimir Rybakov	Kamaz	28:56:24	
11	2	(Czech Republic) Aleš Loprais (Belgium) Serge Bruynkens (Czech Republic) Radim Pustějovský	Tatra	55:43	0:56	2	(Russia) Ayrat Mardeev (Russia) Aydar Belyaev (Russia) Anton Mirniy	Kamaz	29:31:35	35:11
11	3	(Russia) Eduard Nikolaev (Russia) Sergey Savostin (Russia) Vladimir Rybakov	Kamaz	56:53	2:06	3	(Czech Republic) Martin Kolomy (Czech Republic) René Kilian (Czech Republic) David Kilian	Tatra	29:45:19	48:55
12	1	(Russia) Andrey Karginov (Russia) Igor Devyatkin (Russia) Andrey Mokeev	Kamaz	4:09:44		1	(Russia) Eduard Nikolaev (Russia) Sergey Savostin (Russia) Vladimir Rybakov	Kamaz	33:12:35	
12	2	(Russia) Ayrat Mardeev (Russia) Aydar Belyaev (Russia) Anton Mirniy	Kamaz	4:12:20	2:36	2	(Russia) Ayrat Mardeev (Russia) Aydar Belyaev (Russia) Anton Mirniy	Kamaz	33:43:55	31:20
12	3	(Netherlands) Gérard de Rooy (Belgium) Tom Colsoul (Netherlands) Darek Rodewald	Iveco	4:12:33	2:49	3	(Russia) Andrey Karginov (Russia) Igor Devyatkin (Russia) Andrey Mokeev	Kamaz	34:03:01	50:26
13	1	(Russia) Andrey Karginov (Russia) Igor Devyatkin (Russia) Andrey Mokeev	Kamaz	4:06:30		1	(Russia) Eduard Nikolaev (Russia) Sergey Savostin (Russia) Vladimir Rybakov	Kamaz	37:33:07	
13	2	(Netherlands) Gérard de Rooy (Belgium) Tom Colsoul (Netherlands) Darek Rodewald	Iveco	4:09:18	2:48	2	(Russia) Andrey Karginov (Russia) Igor Devyatkin (Russia) Andrey Mokeev	Kamaz	38:09:31	36:24
13	3	(Czech Republic) Aleš Loprais (Belgium) Serge Bruynkens (Czech Republic) Radim Pustějovský	Tatra	4:14:34	8:04	3	(Russia) Ayrat Mardeev (Russia) Aydar Belyaev (Russia) Anton Mirniy	Kamaz	38:13:34	40:27
14	1	(Netherlands) Peter Versluis (Netherlands) Harry Schuurmans (Belgium) Jurgen Damen	MAN	2:02:40		1	(Russia) Eduard Nikolaev (Russia) Sergey Savostin (Russia) Vladimir Rybakov	Kamaz	39:41:43	
14	2	(Netherlands) Gérard de Rooy (Belgium) Tom Colsoul (Netherlands) Darek Rodewald	Iveco	2:04:44	2:04	2	(Russia) Ayrat Mardeev (Russia) Aydar Belyaev (Russia) Anton Mirniy	Kamaz	40:18:53	37:10
14	3	(Italy) Miki Biasion (Italy) Humberto Fiori (Netherlands) Michel Huisman	Iveco	2:04:57	2:17	3	(Russia) Andrey Karginov (Russia) Igor Devyatkin (Russia) Andrey Mokeev	Kamaz	40:19:40	37:57

== Final standings ==
=== Bikes ===
Starters	Finishers
183	125 (68.3%)

Pos	No.	Rider	Bike	Entrant	Time	Gap
1	1	(France) Cyril Despres	KTM 450 Rally	KTM Red Bull Rally Factory Team	43:24:22	
2	11	(Portugal) Ruben Faria	KTM 450 Rally	KTM Red Bull Rally Factory Team	43:35:05	+10:43
3	7	(Chile) Francisco López	KTM 450 Rally	Tamarugal XC	43:43:10	+18:48
4	32	(Slovakia) Ivan Jakeš	KTM 450 Rally	Nad Ress Adventure Team	43:48:16	+23:54
5	12	(Spain) Joan Pedrero	KTM 450 Rally	AMV Red Bull KTM 450 Rally Factory Team	44:19:51	+55:29
6	9	(France) Olivier Pain	Yamaha	Yamaha Racing France	44:30:52	+1:06:30
7	3	(Portugal) Hélder Rodrigues	Honda	Team HRC	44:35:44	+1:11:22
8	30	(Argentina) Javier Pizzolito	Honda	Team HRC	44:50:29	+1:26:07
9	15	(Netherlands) Frans Verhoeven	Yamaha	Yamaha Netherlands	44:50:57	+1:26:35
10	20	(Portugal) Paulo Gonçalves	Husqvarna	Husqvarna Rally Team by Speedbrain	44:52:42	+1:28:20

=== Quads ===
Starters	Finishers
38	26 (68.4%)

Pos	No.	Rider	Quad	Time	Gap
1	250	(Argentina) Marcos Patronelli	Yamaha	49:42:42	
2	254	(Chile) Ignacio Casale	Yamaha	51:33:17	+1:50:35
3	253	(Poland) Rafał Sonik	Yamaha	52:59:31	+3:16:49
4	256	(Argentina) Lucas Bonetto	Honda	54:18:39	+3:40:10
5	263	(Chile) Sebastian Palma	Can-Am	54:18:39	+4:35:57
6	265	(Netherlands) Sebastian Husseini	Honda	55:22:45	+5:40:03
7	274	(Australia) Paul Smith	Honda	55:28:51	+5:46:09
8	268	(Peru) Ignacio Flores	Yamaha	55:52:09	+6:09:27
9	290	(Argentina) Claudio Clavigliasso	Can-Am	56:02:23	+6:19:41
10	262	(Argentina) Luciano Gagliardi	Yamaha	56:12:18	6:29:36

=== Cars ===
Starters	Finishers
152	90 (59.2%)

Pos	No.	Driver	Co-Driver	Car	Entrant	Time	Gap
1	302	(France) Stéphane Peterhansel	(France) Jean-Paul Cottret	Mini	Monster Energy X-Raid Team	38:32:39	
2	301	(South Africa) Giniel de Villiers	(Germany) Dirk von Zitzewitz	Toyota	Imperial Toyota	39:15:01	+42:22
3	307	(Russia) Leonid Novitskiy	(Russia) Konstantin Zhiltsov	Mini	Monster Energy X-Raid Team	40:01:01	+1:28:22
4	305	(Spain) Nani Roma	(France) Michel Périn	Mini	Monster Energy X-Raid Team	40:09:22	+1:36:43
5	319	(Argentina) Orlando Terranova	(Portugal) Paulo Fiuza	BMW	X-Raid Team	40:21:49	+1:49:10
6	308	(Portugal) Carlos Sousa	(Portugal) Miguel Ramalho	Great Wall	Team Great Wall	41:10:55	+2:38:16
7	316	(France) Ronan Chabot	(France) Gilles Pillot	SMG	Toys Motors SMG	41:50:44	+3:18:05
8	309	(France) Guerlain Chicherit	(France) Jean-Pierre Garcin	SMG	Astana SMG	42:00:23	+3:27:44
9	328	(France) Pascal Thomasse	(France) Pascal Larroque	MD	MD Rallye Sport	43:08:11	+4:35:32
10	306	(Argentina) Lucio Alvarez	(Argentina) Bernardo Graue	Toyota	Overdrive Toyota	43:18:27	+4:45:48

=== Trucks ===
Starters	Finishers
75	60 (80.0%)

Pos	No.	Driver	Co-Drivers	Truck	Time	Gap
1	501	(Russia) Eduard Nikolaev	(Russia) Sergey Savostin (Russia) Vladimir Rybakov	Kamaz	39:41:43	
2	505	(Russia) Ayrat Mardeev	(Russia) Aydar Belyaev (Russia) Anton Mirniy	Kamaz	40:18:53	+37:10
3	510	(Russia) Andrey Karginov	(Russia) Andrey Mokeev (Russia) Igor Devyatkin	Kamaz	40:19:40	+37:57
4	500	(Netherlands) Gérard de Rooy	(Belgium) Tom Colsoul (Netherlands) Darek Rodewald	Iveco	40:22:59	+41:16
5	506	(Czech Republic) Martin Kolomy	(Czech Republic) René Kilian (Czech Republic) David Kilian	Tatra	40:43:30	+1:01:47
6	503	(Czech Republic) Aleš Loprais	(Belgium) Serge Bruynkens (Czech Republic) Radim Pustějovský	Tatra	40:57:53	+1:16:10
7	509	(Netherlands) Pieter Versluis	(Netherlands) Harry Schuurmans (Belgium) Jurgen Damen	MAN	42:13:52	+2:32:09
8	502	(Netherlands) Marcel van Vliet	(Germany) Artur Klein (Netherlands) Marcel Pronk	MAN	43:03:46	+3:22:13
9	514	(Netherlands) René Kuipers	(Netherlands) Peter van Eerd (Spain) Moises Torrallardona	Iveco	43:35:33	+3:53:50
10	534	(Netherlands) Peter van den Bosch	(Netherlands) Patrick Bouw (Netherlands) Wouter Rosegaar	DAF	44:05:35	+4:23:52

== Fatalities ==
It was reported that, on the evening of 9 January, two people died as a result of a collision between a taxi and the support vehicle for the 'Race2Recovery' team, which is made up of ex-military servicemen from the UK. The team members travelling in the support vehicle were taken to hospital along with the four surviving passengers of the taxi.

On 11 January, a competitor in the motorcycle category, Frenchman Thomas Bourgin, was killed in a road accident with a Chilean police car whilst travelling to the start of the day's stage. He was running 68th overall at the time of the incident.
