= 2007 Dakar Rally =

Off-road motorsport event in Europe and Africa

← Previous event	Next event →
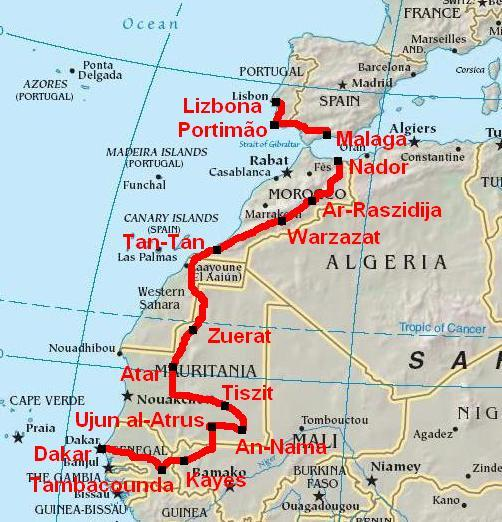
- The route
- Host country: Portugal; Spain; Morocco; Mauritania; Mali; Senegal

Results
- Cars winner: (France) Stéphane Peterhansel (France) Jean-Paul Cottret; Mitsubishi Pajero Evolution
- Bikes winner: (France) Cyril Despres; KTM
- Trucks winner: (Netherlands) Hans Stacey; MAN

The 2007 Dakar Rally was the 29th running of the event. It started in Lisbon, Portugal on 6 January and ran through Europe and Africa until 21 January 2007. It was the last time the event would take place in Africa, as the 2008 event (billed as the Central Europe Rally) since the ASO relocated the race to an all-Eastern Europe route in April because of terrorist attacks, and moved to South America from 2009.

== Entries ==
Number of participants
Stage	Bikes	Cars	Trucks	Total
Start of Rally	245	181	85	511
Rest Day	173	128	66	367
End of Rally	132	109	59	300

=== Bikes ===
Leading Entries
Manufacturer	Team	No.	Rider
(Austria) KTM	KTM Repsol	1	(Spain) Marc Coma
(Austria) KTM	KTM Repsol	3	(Italy) Giovanni Sala
(Austria) KTM	KTM Repsol	21	(Spain) Jordi Viladoms
(Austria) KTM	Gauloises KTM	2	(France) Cyril Despres
(Austria) KTM	Gauloises KTM	4	(Spain) Isidre Esteve
(Austria) KTM	Gauloises KTM	8	(France) David Casteu
(Austria) KTM	Gauloises KTM	14	(Netherlands) Frans Verhoeven
(Austria) KTM	Petrobras-Lubrax	5	(Brazil) Jean de Azevedo
(Austria) KTM	Team Scandinavia	6	(Norway) Pål Anders Ullevålseter
(Austria) KTM	KTM-Toni-Togo	7	(France) Alain Duclos
(Austria) KTM	Red Bull KTM USA	9	(United States) Chris Blais
(Austria) KTM	Pai-Rally Pan America	25	(United States) Jonah Street
(Japan) Yamaha	Bianchiprata Compet Vodafone	10	(Portugal) Hélder Rodrigues
(Japan) Yamaha	Challenge Yamaha Africa	12	(France) David Frétigné

=== Cars ===
Leading Entries
Manufacturer	Team	No.	Driver	Co-Driver
(Japan) Mitsubishi	Mitsubishi Ralliart	300	(France) Luc Alphand	(France) Gilles Picard
(Japan) Mitsubishi	Mitsubishi Ralliart	302	(France) Stéphane Peterhansel	(France) Jean-Paul Cottret
(Japan) Mitsubishi	Mitsubishi Ralliart	304	(Spain) Nani Roma	(Spain) Lucas Cruz
(Japan) Mitsubishi	Mitsubishi Ralliart	306	(Japan) Hiroshi Masuoka	(France) Pascal Maimon
(Germany) Volkswagen	Volkswagen Motorsport	301	(South Africa) Giniel de Villiers	(Germany) Dirk von Zitzewitz
(Germany) Volkswagen	Volkswagen Motorsport	303	(Spain) Carlos Sainz	(France) Michel Périn
(Germany) Volkswagen	Volkswagen Motorsport	305	(United States) Mark Miller	(South Africa) Ralph Pitchford
(Germany) Volkswagen	Volkswagen Motorsport	308	(Finland) Ari Vatanen	(Italy) Fabrizia Pons
(Germany) Volkswagen	Team Lagos	313	(Portugal) Carlos Sousa	(Germany) Andreas Schulz
(Germany) BMW	X-Raid	307	(Germany) Jutta Kleinschmidt	(Sweden) Tina Thörner
(Germany) BMW	X-Raid	309	(Qatar) Nasser Al-Attiyah	(France) Alain Guehennec
(Germany) BMW	X-Raid	312	(France) Guerlain Chicherit	(France) Matthieu Baumel
(Germany) BMW	X-Raid	314	(Spain) José Luis Monterde	(Belgium) Jean-Marie Lurquin
(France) Schlesser	Schlesser-Ford Raid	310	(France) Jean-Louis Schlesser	(France) Arnaud Debron
(Japan) Nissan	Team Dessoude	317	(France) Christian Lavieille	(France) François Borsotto
(Japan) Nissan	Team Dessoude	319	(France) Yvan Muller	(France) René Metge
(Japan) Nissan	De Mévius Team	329	(Poland) Krzysztof Hołowczyc	(Belgium) Jean-Marc Fortin
(Japan) Nissan	Tecnosport-Italia	342	(Japan) Kenjiro Shinozuka	(Italy) Roberto di Persio
(United States) Hummer	Team Gordon	320	(United States) Robby Gordon	(United States) Andy Grider
(Japan) Honda	Fast & Speed	327	(Belgium) Freddy Loix	(Netherlands) Herman Vaanholt

=== Trucks ===
Leading Entries
Manufacturer	Team	No.	Driver	Co-Drivers
(Russia) Kamaz	Kamaz-Master	500	(Russia) Vladimir Chagin	(Russia) Semen Yakubov (Russia) Sergey Savostin
(Russia) Kamaz	Kamaz-Master	505	(Russia) Sergey Reshetnikov	(Russia) Andrey Mokeev (Russia) Eduard Kupriyanov
(Russia) Kamaz	Kamaz-Master	527	(Russia) Ilgizar Mardeev	(Russia) Aydar Belyaev (Russia) Eduard Nikolaev
(Germany) MAN	Exact-Man	501	(Netherlands) Hans Stacey	(Belgium) Charly Gotlib (Netherlands) Bernard der Kinderen
(Germany) MAN	Exact-Man	508	(France) Philippe Jacquot	(France) Willy Alcaraz (Netherlands) Toon van Genugten
(Germany) MAN	Exact-Man	516	(Germany) Franz Echter	(Germany) Detlef Ruf (Netherlands) Edwin van Dooren
(Netherlands) GINAF	Team De Rooy	502	(Netherlands) Jan de Rooy	(Belgium) Dany Colebunders (Belgium) Clemens Smulders
(Netherlands) GINAF	Team De Rooy	509	(Netherlands) Gérard de Rooy	(Belgium) Tom Colsoul (Netherlands) Arno Slaats
(Czech Republic) Tatra	Petrobras-Lubrax	503	(Brazil) André de Azevedo	(Czech Republic) Jaromír Martinec (Brazil) Maykel Justo
(Czech Republic) Tatra	Loprais Tatra Team	512	(Czech Republic) Aleš Loprais	(Czech Republic) Petr Gilar
(Japan) Hino	Sugawara	504	(Japan) Yoshimasa Sugawara	(Japan) Katsumi Hamura
(Japan) Hino	Sugawara	507	(Japan) Teruhito Sugawara	(Japan) Seiichi Suzuki (Japan) Akira Koishizawa
(Italy) Iveco	Motorsport Italia	506	(Italy) Giacomo Vismara	(Italy) Mario Cambiaghi (Italy) Sergio Chionni

== Route ==
The race began in Lisbon, Portugal, and passed through Spain, Morocco, Mauritania, Mali, and Senegal. The total race distance was 7,915 kilometres (4,918 mi), of which 4,309 kilometres (2,677 mi) was timed special stage. There was a rest day in Atar, Mauritania on 13 January.

- pdf file showing 2007 route

=== Stages ===
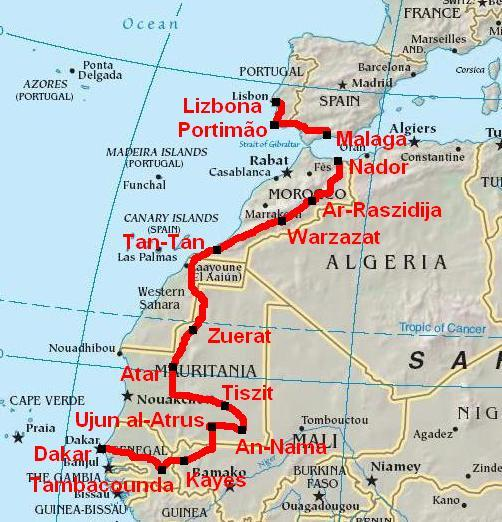
Rally stages map

Stage	Date	From	To	Distance								Stage Winners		
Stage	Date	From	To	Liaison		Special		Liaison		Total		Bikes	Cars	Trucks
Stage	Date	From	To	km	mi	km	mi	km	mi	km	mi	Bikes	Cars	Trucks
1	6 January	(Portugal) Lisbon	(Portugal) Portimão	115	71	117	73	232	144	464	288	(Portugal) R. Faria	(Portugal) C. Sousa	(Netherlands) G. de Rooy
2	7 January	(Portugal) Portimão	(Spain) Málaga	15	9.3	67	42	463	288	545	339	(Portugal) H. Rodrigues	(Spain) C. Sainz	Stage cancelled
3	8 January	(Morocco) Nador	(Morocco) Er Rachidia	205	127	252	157	191	119	648	403	(Spain) M. Coma	(South Africa) G. de Villiers	(Russia) V. Chagin
4	9 January	(Morocco) Er Rachidia	(Morocco) Ouarzazate	96	60	405	252	178	111	679	422	(Spain) M. Coma	(France) J-L. Schlesser	(Russia) V. Chagin
5	10 January	(Morocco) Ouarzazate	(Morocco) Tan-Tan	164	102	325	202	279	173	768	477	(Spain) I. Esteve	(Spain) C. Sainz	(Netherlands) H. Stacey
6	11 January	(Morocco) Tan-Tan	(Mauritania) Zouérat	414	257	394	245	9	5.6	817	508	(Spain) J. Viladoms	(United States) R. Gordon	(Netherlands) H. Stacey
7	12 January	(Mauritania) Zouérat	(Mauritania) Atar	4	2.5	542	337	34	21	580	360	(France) C. Despres	(South Africa) G. de Villiers	(Netherlands) H. Stacey
	13 January	(Mauritania) Atar		Rest day										
8	14 January	(Mauritania) Atar	(Mauritania) Tichit	35	22	589	366	2	1.2	626	389	(Spain) M. Coma	(South Africa) G. de Villiers	(Netherlands) H. Stacey
9	15 January	(Mauritania) Tichit	(Mauritania) Néma	-		494	307	3	1.9	497	309	(Latvia) J. Vinters	(France) J-L. Schlesser	(Netherlands) W. van Ginkel
10	16 January	(Mauritania) Néma	(Mauritania) Néma	10	6.2	336	227	24	15	400	250	(Portugal) H. Rodrigues	(Qatar) N. Al-Attiyah	(Netherlands) A. Brouwer
11	17 January	(Mauritania) Néma	(Mauritania) Ayoun el Atrous	280	170	-		-		280	170	Stage cancelled		
12	18 January	(Mauritania) Ayoun el Atrous	(Mali) Kayes	110	68	257	160	117	73	484	301	(Spain) I. Esteve	(Spain) C. Sainz	(Netherlands) H. Stacey
13	19 January	(Mali) Kayes	(Senegal) Tambacounda	180	110	260	160	18	11	458	285	(France) C. Despres	(Spain) C. Sainz	(Czech Republic) A. Loprais
14	20 January	(Senegal) Tambacounda	(Senegal) Dakar	124	77	225	140	227	141	576	358	(Brazil) J. de Azevedo	(Spain) C. Sainz	(France) P. Jacquot
15	21 January	(Senegal) Dakar		36	22	16	9.9	41	25	93	58	(Latvia) J. Vinters	(South Africa) G. de Villiers	(Netherlands) A. Brouwer

Note: The timed section of stage 7 was shortened to 407.6 kilometres (253.3 mi) due to adverse weather conditions.

=== Top-3 riders per stage ===
==== Motorcycles ====
Stage	Stage Top-3	Make	Time	Leaders Top-3	Make	Time
1	(Portugal) Ruben Faria (Portugal) Helder Rodrigues (Spain) Isidre Esteve	Yamaha; Yamaha; KTM	1:22:07; 1:22:23; 1:27:07	(Portugal) Ruben Faria (Portugal) Helder Rodrigues (Spain) Isidre Esteve	Yamaha; Yamaha; KTM	1:22:07 +0:16 +5:00
2	(Portugal) Helder Rodrigues (Portugal) Ruben Faria (Spain) Isidre Esteve	Yamaha; Yamaha; KTM	1:02:44; 1:03:47; 1:04:29	(Portugal) Helder Rodrigues (Portugal) Ruben Faria (Spain) Isidre Esteve	Yamaha; Yamaha; KTM	2:25:07 +0:47 +6:29
3	(Spain) Marc Coma (United States) Chris Blais (Spain) Isidre Esteve	KTM; KTM; KTM	3:07:39; 3:08:35; 3:10:36	(Spain) Isidre Esteve (Spain) Marc Coma (France) David Casteu	KTM; KTM; KTM	5:42:12 +0:26 +1:03
4	(Spain) Marc Coma (Spain) Isidre Esteve (France) Cyril Despres	KTM; KTM; KTM	4:24:54; 4:40:10; 4:46:50	(Spain) Marc Coma (Spain) Isidre Esteve (France) David Casteu	KTM; KTM; KTM	10:10:32 +11:50 +24:20
5	(Spain) Isidre Esteve (Spain) Marc Coma (France) Cyril Despres	KTM; KTM; KTM	3:56:22; 3:58:16; 4:01:24	(Spain) Marc Coma (Spain) Isidre Esteve (France) David Casteu	KTM; KTM; KTM	14:08:48 +9:56 +37:41
6	(Spain) Jordi Viladoms (Spain) Marc Coma (United States) Chris Blais	KTM; KTM; KTM	3:45:45; 3:46:42; 3:46:45	(Spain) Marc Coma (Spain) Isidre Esteve (France) David Casteu	KTM; KTM; KTM	17:55:30 +12:07 +44:39
7	(France) Cyril Despres (Norway) Pal Anders Ullevalseter (France) David Casteu	KTM; KTM; KTM	4:30:42; 4:33:28; 4:35:18	(Spain) Marc Coma (Spain) Isidre Esteve (France) David Casteu	KTM; KTM; KTM	22:38:34 +10:47 +36:53
8	(Spain) Marc Coma (France) Cyril Despres (Norway) Pal Anders Ullevalseter	KTM; KTM; KTM	7:46:13; 7:56:15; 8:10:13	(Spain) Marc Coma (France) Cyril Despres (France) David Casteu	KTM; KTM; KTM	30:24:47 +54:58 +1:03:15
9	(Latvia) Janis Vinters (France) Cyril Despres (Spain) Marc Coma	KTM; KTM; KTM	6:08:51; 6:16:22; 6:16:44	(Spain) Marc Coma (France) Cyril Despres (France) David Casteu	KTM; KTM; KTM	36:41:31 +54:36 +1:11:15
10	(Portugal) Helder Rodrigues (Spain) Marc Coma (France) Cyril Despres	Yamaha; KTM; KTM	4:12:55; 4:13:39; 4:13:46	(Spain) Marc Coma (France) Cyril Despres (France) David Casteu	KTM; KTM; KTM	40:55:10 +54:43 +1:15:12
11	No competitive race held					
12	(Spain) Isidre Esteve (Portugal) Paulo Gonçalves (Poland) Jacek Czachor	KTM; Honda; KTM	3:34:46; 3:37:49; 3:38:50	(Spain) Marc Coma (France) Cyril Despres (France) David Casteu	KTM; KTM; KTM	44:47:16 +52:48 +1:10:13
13	(France) Cyril Despres (United States) Chris Blais (France) Michel Marchini	KTM; KTM; Yamaha	3:00:56; 3:07:03; 3:11:21	(France) Cyril Despres (France) David Casteu (United States) Chris Blais	KTM; KTM; KTM	48:41:00 +32:56 +54:52
14	(Brazil) Jean de Azevedo (Poland) Jacek Czachor (Latvia) Janis Vinters	KTM; KTM; KTM	2:37:46; 2:39:51; 2:42:51	(France) Cyril Despres (France) David Casteu (United States) Chris Blais	KTM; KTM; KTM	51:25:49 +36:09 +53:01
15	(Latvia) Janis Vinters (Norway) Pal Anders Ullevalseter (Portugal) Helder Rodrigues	KTM; KTM; Yamaha	0:08:42; 0:08:49; 0:09:07	(France) Cyril Despres (France) David Casteu (United States) Chris Blais	KTM; KTM; KTM	51:36:53 +34:19 +52:06

==== Cars ====
Stage	Stage Top-3	Make	Time	Leaders Top-3	Make	Time
1	(Portugal) Carlos Sousa (South Africa) Giniel de Villiers (Spain) Carlos Sainz	Volkswagen; Volkswagen; Volkswagen	1:20:38; 1:23:09; 1:23:16	(Portugal) Carlos Sousa (South Africa) Giniel de Villiers (Spain) Carlos Sainz	Volkswagen; Volkswagen; Volkswagen	1:20:38 +2:31 +2:38
2	(Spain) Carlos Sainz (Spain) Nani Roma (France) Luc Alphand	Volkswagen; Mitsubishi; Mitsubishi	0:59:26; 0:59:55; 0:59:55	(Portugal) Carlos Sousa (Spain) Carlos Sainz (South Africa) Giniel de Villiers	Volkswagen; Volkswagen; Volkswagen	2:21:57 +0:45 +2:12
3	(South Africa) Giniel de Villiers (Spain) Carlos Sainz (France) Stéphane Peterhansel	Volkswagen; Volkswagen; Mitsubishi	2:46:12; 2:46:37; 2:49:30	(Spain) Carlos Sainz (South Africa) Giniel de Villiers (Portugal) Carlos Sousa	Volkswagen; Volkswagen; Volkswagen	5:09:19 +1:02 +4:26
4	(France) Jean-Louis Schlesser (Portugal) Carlos Sousa (Spain) Carlos Sainz	Schlesser-Ford; Volkswagen; Volkswagen	3:59:54; 4:07:46; 4:07:52	(Spain) Carlos Sainz (South Africa) Giniel de Villiers (Portugal) Carlos Sousa	Volkswagen; Volkswagen; Volkswagen	9:17:11 +1:55 +4:20
5	(Spain) Carlos Sainz (France) Stéphane Peterhansel (South Africa) Giniel de Villiers	Volkswagen; Mitsubishi; Volkswagen	3:36:39; 3:37:09; 3:38:20	(Spain) Carlos Sainz (South Africa) Giniel de Villiers (Portugal) Carlos Sousa	Volkswagen; Volkswagen; Volkswagen	12:53:50 +3:36 +11:17
6	(United States) Robby Gordon (France) Jean-Louis Schlesser (South Africa) Giniel de Villiers	Hummer; Schlesser-Ford; Volkswagen	2:58:57; 2:59:14; 3:05:49	(Spain) Carlos Sainz (South Africa) Giniel de Villiers (Portugal) Carlos Sousa	Volkswagen; Volkswagen; Volkswagen	16:00:04 +3:11 +14:03
7	(South Africa) Giniel de Villiers (France) Stéphane Peterhansel (Spain) Carlos Sainz	Volkswagen; Mitsubishi; Volkswagen	4:00:46; 4:03:32; 4:05:36	(South Africa) Giniel de Villiers (Spain) Carlos Sainz (France) Stéphane Peterhansel	Volkswagen; Volkswagen; Mitsubishi	20:04:01 +1:39 +24:38
8	(South Africa) Giniel de Villiers (France) Stéphane Peterhansel (France) Luc Alphand	Volkswagen; Mitsubishi; Mitsubishi	7:31:52; 7:38:27; 7:41:03	(South Africa) Giniel de Villiers (France) Stéphane Peterhansel (France) Luc Alphand	Volkswagen; Mitsubishi; Mitsubishi	27:35:53 +31:13 +43:04
9	(France) Jean-Louis Schlesser (France) Luc Alphand (France) Stéphane Peterhansel	Schlesser-Ford; Mitsubishi; Mitsubishi	5:32:03; 5:32:16; 5:36:17	(France) Stéphane Peterhansel (France) Luc Alphand (France) Jean-Louis Schlesser	Mitsubishi; Mitsubishi; Schlesser-Ford	33:43:23 +7:50 +1:25:32
10	(Qatar) Nasser Al-Attiyah (Japan) Hiroshi Masuoka (United States) Mark Miller	BMW; Mitsubishi; Volkswagen	3:49:48; 3:50:16; 3:51:37	(France) Stéphane Peterhansel (France) Luc Alphand (France) Jean-Louis Schlesser	Mitsubishi; Mitsubishi; Schlesser-Ford	37:35:19 +9:56 +1:30:50
11	No competitive race held					
12	(Spain) Carlos Sainz (Portugal) Carlos Sousa (France) Luc Alphand	Volkswagen; Volkswagen; Mitsubishi	2:58:56; 3:02:49; 3:03:48	(France) Stéphane Peterhansel (France) Luc Alphand (France) Jean-Louis Schlesser	Mitsubishi; Mitsubishi; Schlesser-Ford	40:42:34 +6:29 +1:34:02
13	(Spain) Carlos Sainz (France) Stéphane Peterhansel (United States) Mark Miller	Volkswagen; Mitsubishi; Volkswagen	2:30:22; 2:30:48; 2:32:40	(France) Stéphane Peterhansel (France) Luc Alphand (France) Jean-Louis Schlesser	Mitsubishi; Mitsubishi; Schlesser-Ford	43:13:22 +11:15 +1:38:47
14	(Spain) Carlos Sainz (South Africa) Giniel de Villiers (Portugal) Carlos Sousa	Volkswagen; Volkswagen; Volkswagen	2:21:02; 2:21:09; 2:21:47	(France) Stéphane Peterhansel (France) Luc Alphand (France) Jean-Louis Schlesser	Mitsubishi; Mitsubishi; Schlesser-Ford	45:42:45 +7:16 +1:36:24
15	(South Africa) Giniel de Villiers (Spain) Carlos Sainz (United States) Robby Gordon	Volkswagen; Volkswagen; Hummer	0:07:42; 0:07:44; 0:08:08	(France) Stéphane Peterhansel (France) Luc Alphand (France) Jean-Louis Schlesser	Mitsubishi; Mitsubishi; Schlesser-Ford	45:53:37 +7:26 +1:33:57

==== Trucks ====
Stage	Stage Top-3	Make	Time	Leaders Top-3	Make	Time
1	(Netherlands) Gerard de Rooy (Netherlands) Hans Stacey (Russia) Vladimir Chagin	GINAF; MAN; Kamaz	1:40:00; 1:40:20; 1:40:46	(Netherlands) Gerard de Rooy (Netherlands) Hans Stacey (Russia) Vladimir Chagin	GINAF; MAN; Kamaz	1:40:00 +0:20 +0:46
2	No competitive race held					
3	(Russia) Vladimir Chagin (Netherlands) Gerard de Rooy (Netherlands) Hans Stacey	Kamaz; GINAF; MAN	3:22:13; 3:32:52; 3:33:48	(Russia) Vladimir Chagin (Netherlands) Gerard de Rooy (Netherlands) Hans Stacey	Kamaz; GINAF; MAN	5:02:59 +9:53 +11:09
4	(Russia) Vladimir Chagin (Netherlands) Hans Stacey (Russia) Ilgizar Mardeev	Kamaz; MAN; Kamaz	4:56:13; 5:09:08; 5:25:19	(Russia) Vladimir Chagin (Netherlands) Hans Stacey (Netherlands) Gerard de Rooy	Kamaz; MAN; GINAF	9:59:12 +24:04 +54:48
5	(Netherlands) Hans Stacey (Netherlands) Gerard de Rooy (Russia) Ilgizar Mardeev	MAN; GINAF; Kamaz	3:41:59; 3:45:50; 3:53:45	(Netherlands) Hans Stacey (Netherlands) Gerard de Rooy (Russia) Ilgizar Mardeev	MAN; GINAF; Kamaz	14:05:15 +34:35 +1:30:27
6	(Netherlands) Hans Stacey (Netherlands) Gerard de Rooy (Russia) Ilgizar Mardeev	MAN; GINAF; Kamaz	3:39:58; 3:54:05; 3:56:10	(Netherlands) Hans Stacey (Netherlands) Gerard de Rooy (Russia) Ilgizar Mardeev	MAN; GINAF; Kamaz	17:45:13 +48:42 +1:46:39
7	(Netherlands) Hans Stacey (France) Philippe Jacquot (Czech Republic) Tomáš Tomeček	MAN; MAN; Tatra	4:51:44; 5:18:36; 5:19:41	(Netherlands) Hans Stacey (Russia) Ilgizar Mardeev (Netherlands) Wulfert van Ginkel	MAN; Kamaz; GINAF	22:36:57 +2:16:28 +3:13:14
8	(Netherlands) Hans Stacey (Russia) Ilgizar Mardeev (Netherlands) Arjan Brouwer	MAN; Kamaz; GINAF	8:58:49; 9:38:57; 9:41:37	(Netherlands) Hans Stacey (Russia) Ilgizar Mardeev (Netherlands) Wulfert van Ginkel	MAN; Kamaz; GINAF	31:35:46 +2:56:36 +4:31:22
9	(Netherlands) Wulfert van Ginkel (Netherlands) Hans Stacey (Czech Republic) Aleš Loprais	GINAF; MAN; Tatra	6:47:47; 7:00:15; 7:01:07	(Netherlands) Hans Stacey (Russia) Ilgizar Mardeev (Netherlands) Wulfert van Ginkel	MAN; Kamaz; GINAF	38:36:01 +3:07:11 +4:18:54
10	(Netherlands) Arjan Brouwer (Brazil) André de Azevedo (Russia) Ilgizar Mardeev	GINAF; Tatra; Kamaz	4:36:22; 4:43:55; 4:45:43	(Netherlands) Hans Stacey (Russia) Ilgizar Mardeev (Netherlands) Wulfert van Ginkel	MAN; Kamaz; GINAF	43:38:51 +2:50:04 +4:18:48
11	No competitive race held					
12	(Netherlands) Hans Stacey (Czech Republic) Tomáš Tomeček (Netherlands) Wulfert van Ginkel	MAN; Tatra; GINAF	3:48:04; 3:52:57; 3:53:54	(Netherlands) Hans Stacey (Russia) Ilgizar Mardeev (Netherlands) Wulfert van Ginkel	MAN; Kamaz; GINAF	47:26:55 +2:59:36 +4:24:38
13	(Czech Republic) Aleš Loprais (Netherlands) Hans Stacey (Russia) Ilgizar Mardeev	Tatra; MAN; Kamaz	3:17:43; 3:21:08; 3:24:22	(Netherlands) Hans Stacey (Russia) Ilgizar Mardeev (Netherlands) Wulfert van Ginkel	MAN; Kamaz; GINAF	50:48:03 +3:02:50 +4:28:25
14	(France) Philippe Jacquot (Czech Republic) Aleš Loprais (Brazil) André de Azevedo	MAN; Tatra; Tatra	2:53:44; 2:58:17; 3:03:16	(Netherlands) Hans Stacey (Russia) Ilgizar Mardeev (Czech Republic) Aleš Loprais	MAN; Kamaz; Tatra	53:52:15 +3:08:15 +4:45:49
15	(Netherlands) Arjan Brouwer (Czech Republic) Aleš Loprais (Netherlands) Hans Bekx	GINAF; Tatra; DAF	0:09:39; 0:10:31; 0:10:33	(Netherlands) Hans Stacey (Russia) Ilgizar Mardeev (Czech Republic) Aleš Loprais	MAN; Kamaz; Tatra	54:03:05 +3:10:52 +4:45:30

== Final standings ==
A total of 132 bikes (52.8% of starters), 109 cars (58.3%), and 60 trucks (68.2%) finished the race.

=== Motorcycles ===
Pos	No	Rider	Bike	Entrant	Time
1	2	(France) Cyril Despres	KTM 690 Rally	Gauloises-KTM	51:36:53
2	8	(France) David Casteu	KTM 690 Rally	Gauloises-KTM	52:11:12
3	9	(United States) Chris Blais	KTM 660 Rally	Red Bull KTM USA	52:28:59
4	6	(Norway) Pål Anders Ullevålseter	KTM 660 Rally	Team Scandinavia	53:14:50
5	10	(Portugal) Hélder Rodrigues	Yamaha 450 WRF	Bianchiprata Compet Vodafone	54:07:34
6	23	(Latvia) Janis Vinters	KTM 660 Rally	JV Moto Team Riga	54:21:14
7	20	(France) Michel Marchini	Yamaha 450 WRF		54:37:20
8	85	(France) Thierry Bethys	Honda 450 CRF X	Honda Europe	55:03:26
9	103	(Slovakia) Jaroslav Katriňák	KTM 660 Rally	Mol Dakar Team	55:17:03
10	16	(Poland) Jacek Czachor	KTM 660 Rally	Orlen Team	56:00:57

=== Cars ===
Pos	No	Driver	Co-Driver	Car	Entrant	Time
1	302	(France) Stéphane Peterhansel	(France) Jean-Paul Cottret	Mitsubishi Pajero Evolution	Repsol Mitsubishi Ralliart	45:53:37
2	300	(France) Luc Alphand	(France) Gilles Picard	Mitsubishi Pajero	Repsol Mitsubishi Ralliart	46:01:03
3	310	(France) Jean-Louis Schlesser	(France) Arnaud Debron	Schlesser-Ford	Schlesser-Ford Raid	47:27:34
4	305	(United States) Mark Miller	(South Africa) Ralph Pitchford	Volkswagen Race Touareg 2	Volkswagen Motorsport	48:03:53
5	306	(Japan) Hiroshi Masuoka	(France) Pascal Maimon	Mitsubishi Pajero	Repsol Mitsubishi Ralliart	48:38:08
6	309	(Qatar) Nasser Al-Attiyah	(France) Alain Guehennec	BMW X3	X-Raid	49:25:36
7	313	(Portugal) Carlos Sousa	(Germany) Andreas Schulz	Volkswagen Touareg 2	Team Lagos	51:04:31
8	320	(United States) Robby Gordon	(United States) Andy Grider	Hummer H3	Team Gordon	52:57:44
9	303	(Spain) Carlos Sainz	(France) Michel Perin	Volkswagen Race Touareg 2	Volkswagen Motorsport	53:19:22
10	318	(Belgium) Stephane Henrard	(Belgium) Brigitte Becue	Volkswagen Buggy	Henrard Racing Team	54:22:06

=== Trucks ===
Pos	No	Driver	Co-Drivers	Truck	Time
1	501	(Netherlands) Hans Stacey	(Belgium) Charly Gotlib (Netherlands) Bernard der Kinderen	MAN TGA	54:03:05
2	527	(Russia) Ilgizar Mardeev	(Russia) Aydar Belyaev (Russia) Eduard Nikolaev	Kamaz 4911	57:13:57
3	512	(Czech Republic) Aleš Loprais	(Czech Republic) Petr Gilar	Tatra T815	58:48:35
4	513	(Netherlands) Wulfert van Ginkel	(Netherlands) Willem Tijsterman (Netherlands) Richard de Rooy	GINAF X 2222	58:54:15
5	503	(Brazil) André de Azevedo	(Brazil) Maykel Justo (Czech Republic) Jaromír Martinec	Tatra T815	59:19:02
6	508	(France) Philippe Jacquot	(France) Willy Alcaraz (Netherlands) Toon van Genugten	MAN	60:03:32
7	505	(Russia) Sergey Reshetnikov	(Russia) Andrey Mokeev (Russia) Eduard Kupriyanov	Kamaz 4911	61:50:47
8	530	(Netherlands) Arjan Brouwer	(Netherlands) Simon Koetsier (Netherlands) Gerard van Veenendaal	GINAF X 2222	62:30:31
9	507	(Japan) Teruhito Sugawara	(Japan) Seiichi Suzuki (Japan) Akira Koishizawa	Hino Ranger - Pro FT	65:05:47
10	516	(Germany) Franz Echter	(Germany) Detlef Ruf (Germany) Edwin van Dooren	MAN TGA	65:13:08

== Incidents ==
The 2007 event was marred by the deaths of two competitors, both in the motorcycle division. The first was South African motorcyclist Elmer Symons, who was competing in the rally for the first time, on the fourth stage between Er Rachidia and Ouarzazate. He was the 47th competitor to die taking part in the Dakar. The second death occurred on the 14th and penultimate stage; French motorcyclist Eric Aubijoux was found dead 15 kilometres (9.3 mi) from the finish line in Dakar. Initial reports indicated he had suffered a fatal heart attack. Later investigations indicated he had been involved earlier in an accident with another vehicle.
