= Kurt Caselli =

American motorcycle racer

Kurt William Caselli (June 30, 1983 – November 15, 2013) was an American professional off-road motorcycle racer. He was a three-time AMA Hare & Hound National Champion and the 2007 AMA Sportsman of the Year. He died in a racing accident during the 2013 Baja 1000 in Baja California, Mexico.

== Early life ==
Caselli grew up in Palmdale, California, the child of two desert racers who encouraged him in his athletic goals. He began racing at the age of 12 in Southern California's District 37. Caselli's father Rich died in 2008. He was survived by his mother Nancy, sister Carolyn.

== Career ==
Caselli's career achievements include:

- Three American Motorcyclist Association (AMA) National Hare and Hound National Championships, in 2011, 2012, and 2013
- AMA Sportsman of the Year in 2007
- Multiple International Six Days Enduro medals
- Winner of the 2013 Desafio Ruta 40 Rally in Argentina
- Two stages at the 2013 Dakar Rally with Factory KTM in place of injured rider Marc Coma
- Three Championships in the World Off Road Championship Series (WORCS)
- AMA Hall of Fame inductee 2019

== Death and aftermath ==
On November 15, 2013, Caselli crashed while competing in the Baja 1000, a race in Baja California, Mexico, after colliding with a large animal at high speed. Early reports indicated that he hit a man-made booby trap, but that ultimately proved to be incorrect information. Caselli did not receive immediate medical attention, and he died at the site of his accident from internal injuries. He was 30 years old. His family honored his life and celebrated by hosting a memorial ride day on December 6, 2013, at Glen Helen Raceway in Devore, California. SCORE International have announced that they have taken steps to improve safety at future races. In December 2013, the Kurt Caselli Foundation was established.

== The Kurt Caselli Foundation ==
The Kurt Caselli Foundation was established in December 2013, using donations from the memorial ride day, with the help of fans, family and friends. The foundation's focus is the safety of riders and racers in the off-road motorcycling industry.
