= Éric Aubijoux =

French motorcycle racer (1964–2007)

- Born: 8 December 1964
- Died: 20 January 2007 (aged 42); Dakar, Senegal
- Cause of death: Motorcycle accident
- Known for: Dakar Rally competitor
- Spouse: Sylvie
- Children: Two daughters : Manon & Anouk
- Website: www.eric-aubijoux.vip7.com

Éric Aubijoux (8 December 1964 – 20 January 2007) was a French motorcycle rider. He competed in the Dakar Rally six times, before being killed during the 2007 edition of the event. He was the second fatality of the 2007 Dakar, following the death of fellow motorcyclist, South African Elmer Symons, eleven days earlier.

Aubijoux died on the 14th and penultimate stage between Tambacounda and Dakar. Initially it was thought that this was due to heart failure, however after investigation the cause of death was determined to be the result of an accident. The confusion was caused by the fact that his bike appeared to be undamaged. It is believed he pulled over feeling unwell and then collapsed due to a seizure. He never regained consciousness and died at the scene. He was declared 18th position overall, and was competing in his sixth Dakar Rally.
