= Dao Timmi =

Nigerian military base

Coordinates: 20°32′N 13°33′E

Dao Timmi is an old military installation located in the Djado Plateau of northern Niger.

== History ==
During an uprising by ethnic Toubou people during the 1990s, a minefield was installed.

In response to crackdowns on human traffickers by the government of Niger in response to the European migrant crisis, Dao Timmi became an increasingly popular route, as an alternative to Agadez. It is the site of rock art.
