= Djado Plateau =

Plateau in northeastern Niger, Sahara Desert

Coordinates: 20.983°N 12.333°E

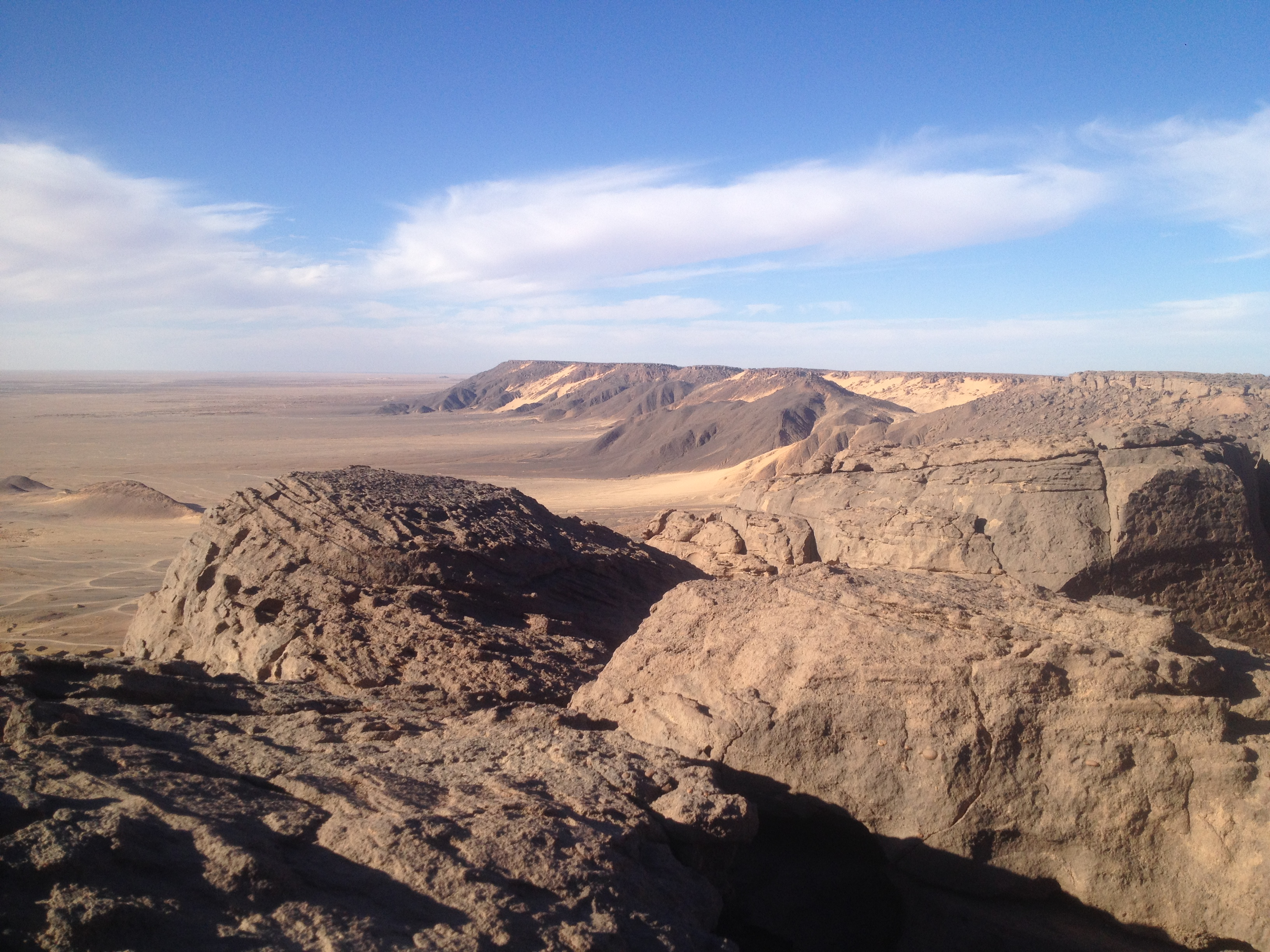
View from the highest point in Djado plateau.

The Djado Plateau lies in the Sahara, in northeastern Niger. It is known for its cave art (often of large mammals long since absent from the area), but is now largely uninhabited, with abandoned towns and forts still standing and visible. As of 2012, the commune of Djado had a total population of 876 people.

In 2014, gold was discovered, which attracted up to 20,000 people from Niger, Chad, Libya and Sudan. Because there were many heavily armed foreigners, and working conditions were very bad, Moussa Hassane Barazé, the responsible minister for mining operations, ordered the mines to be closed in 2017.

== Djado City ==
The ruined city and ksar of Djado lies on the southern end of the plateau at 450 metres (1,500 ft) of elevation within a small oasis of brackish water. It was long ago abandoned by the Kanuri people, who may have been the original founders. Before the abandonment of Djado city, the area was well known for its salt and date production. Now, the salt mines in Djado are rarely used, however there are date palms of the area that are tended by Toubou nomads.

== See also ==
- Dao Timmi
