= Jānis Vinters =

Latvian rally racing motorcycle rider and farmer

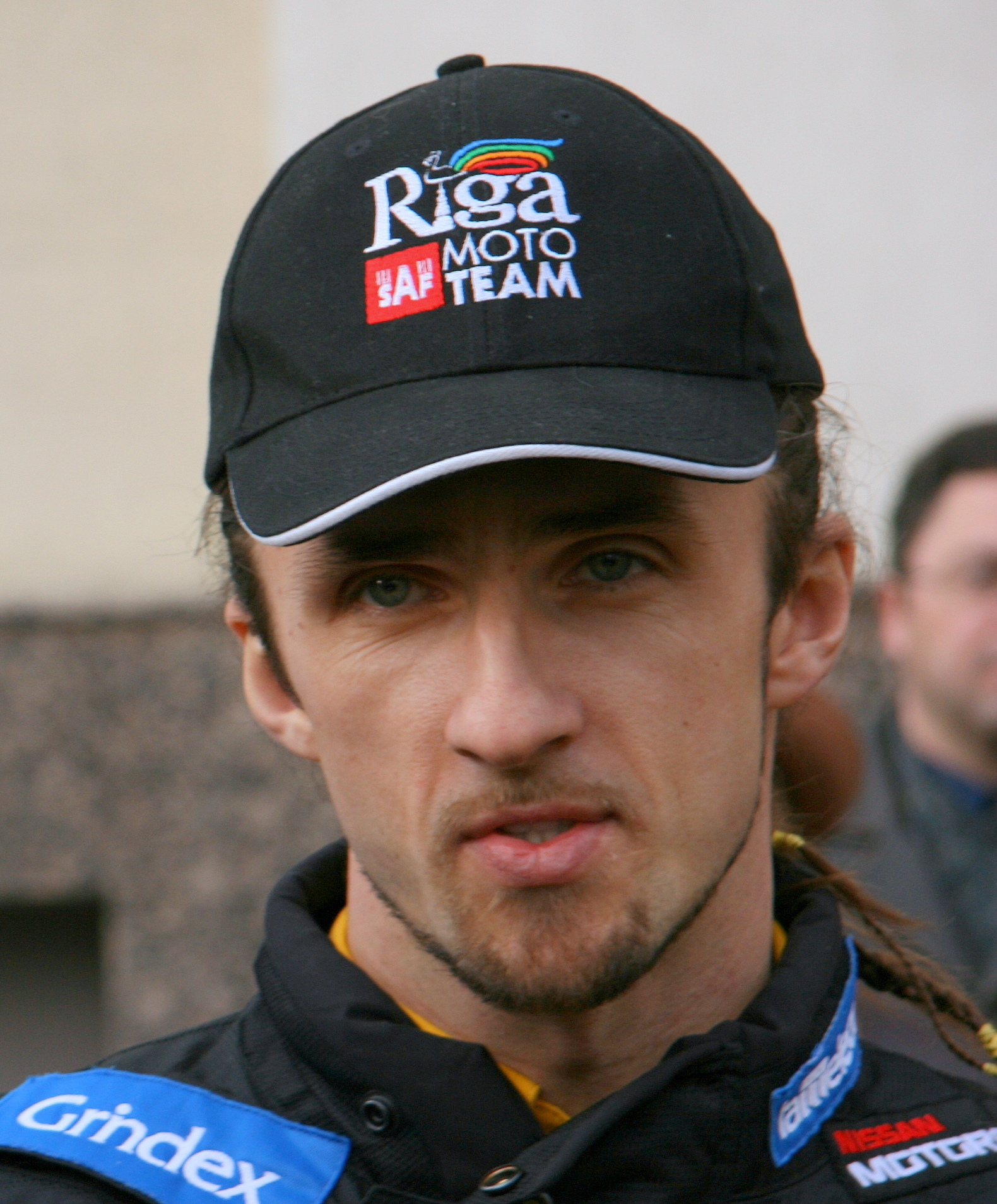

Personal information
- Nationality: Latvian
- Born: 19 December 1971 (age 54) Eleja, Latvian SSR, Soviet Union (now Latvia)
- Height: 1.84 m (6 ft 0 in)
- Weight: 79 kg (174 lb)

Sport
- Country: Latvia

Jānis Vinters (born 19 December 1971) is a Latvian rally racing motorcycle rider and farmer.

Vinters competed several times in the Dakar Rally, including every year until 2007 save for a two-year stretch in 2004–2005 due to injuries. In 2006, he finished in tenth place. In 2007, his last entry to date, he won two stages and ranked sixth.
