= Thomas Bourgin =

French motorcycle racer

Thomas Bourgin (23 December 1986 – 11 January 2013) was a French motorcycle racer. He was in 68th place in the overall ranking of his first Dakar Rally.

Bourgin was born in Saint Etienne and had been racing since 2009, when he took part in the Morocco Rally, followed by a fourth place in the 2011 Africa Race and a seventh-place finish in the Tunisia Rally.

== Death ==
Bourgin died in a traffic collision on 11 January 2013 as he made his way to the start of Stage 7 of the Dakar Rally. He was his way up to the Chilean side of the mountain range when he collided with a Chilean police car that was traveling in the opposite direction. .
