= Elmer Symons =

South African motorcycle racer (1977–2007)

Elmer Symons

Elmer Symons (14 February 1977 – 9 January 2007) was a motorcycle enduro racer.

Symons was born in Ladysmith, KwaZulu-Natal, South Africa. He began enduro racing in 1996 and moved to the United States in 2003. He had placed well in numerous regional competitions and had participated in the 2005 and 2006 Dakar Rally as a support mechanic. He crashed his privateer KTM in rural Morocco and died at the scene at 142 km into the fourth stage in his first attempt to complete the Rally as a rider. The emergency helicopter was with him within eight minutes of his emergency alert beacon triggering, but was unable to do anything other than record his death. He was in 18th place for motorcycles overall, and leading the Marathon class after the previous stage. Symons is the rally's 49th fatality.
