= 2012 Dakar Rally =

Off-road motorsport event in Argentina, Chile, and Peru

← Previous event	Next event →
- Route of the rally across Argentina, Chile and Peru.
- Host country: Argentina; Chile; Peru

Results
- Cars winner: (France) Stéphane Peterhansel (France) Jean-Paul Cottret; Mini All4 Racing
- Bikes winner: (France) Cyril Despres; KTM
- Trucks winner: (Netherlands) Gérard de Rooy; Iveco
- Quads winner: (Argentina) Alejandro Patronelli; Yamaha

The 2012 Dakar Rally was the 34th running of the event. It was held in South America for the fourth successive time.

== Summary ==
By 17 March 2011, Argentine president Cristina Fernández de Kirchner announced that the start would be in Mar del Plata, Argentina, the first stage would end in Bahía Blanca. The course would later cross the provinces of La Pampa, Mendoza, San Juan, La Rioja and Catamarca before crossing to Chile and finally ending in Peru.

On 9 January 2011, Peruvian press announced that Peru would host the three final stages of the 2012 Dakar Rally, with Lima, the Peruvian capital, hosting the awards ceremony. The official announcement took place on 18 February in Paris. A map displaying these final stages was also published.

== Fatal accidents ==
Near the end of the first stage, motorcycle rider Jorge Andrés Boero died following a crash. It was the 21st death of a competitor in the history of the rally. During stage 2, the ultralight aircraft of a father son duo watching the race crashed. Both died at the scene.

== Stages ==
The sixth stage of the rally was cancelled due to heavy rain and snowfalls in the Anden-region near the border of Argentina and Chile.

Stage	Date	From	To	Class	Road Section		Special		Total		Stage winners			
Stage	Date	From	To	Class	km	mi	km	mi	km	mi	Bikes	Quads	Cars	Trucks
1	1 January	(Argentina) Mar del Plata	(Argentina) Santa Rosa	All	763	474	57	35	820	509	(Chile) F. López	(Uruguay) S. Lafuente	(Russia) L. Novitskiy	(Netherlands) M. van Vliet
2	2 January	(Argentina) Santa Rosa	(Argentina) San Rafael	Bikes/Trucks	487	302	295	183	782	486	(Spain) M. Coma	(Uruguay) S. Lafuente	(Qatar) N. Al-Attiyah	(Netherlands) G. de Rooy
2	2 January	(Argentina) Santa Rosa	(Argentina) San Rafael	Cars	487	302	290	180	777	483	(Spain) M. Coma	(Uruguay) S. Lafuente	(Qatar) N. Al-Attiyah	(Netherlands) G. de Rooy
3	3 January	(Argentina) San Rafael	(Argentina) San Juan	Bikes	291	180	270	167	561	348	(France) C. Despres	(Argentina) M. Patronelli	(Spain) N. Roma	(Italy) M. Biasion
3	3 January	(Argentina) San Rafael	(Argentina) San Juan	Cars/Trucks	291	180	208	129	499	310	(France) C. Despres	(Argentina) M. Patronelli	(Spain) N. Roma	(Italy) M. Biasion
4	4 January	(Argentina) San Juan	(Argentina) Chilecito	All	424	263	326	202	750	466	(Spain) M. Coma	(Argentina) T. Maffei	(France) S. Peterhansel	(Netherlands) G. de Rooy
5	5 January	(Argentina) Chilecito	(Argentina) Fiambalá	Bikes	151	93	265	164	416	258	(France) C. Despres	(Argentina) M. Patronelli	(Poland) K. Hołowczyc	(Netherlands) G. de Rooy
5	5 January	(Argentina) Chilecito	(Argentina) Fiambalá	Cars/Trucks	246	152	177	110	363	225	(France) C. Despres	(Argentina) M. Patronelli	(Poland) K. Hołowczyc	(Netherlands) G. de Rooy
6	6 January	(Argentina) Fiambalá	(Chile) Copiapó	All	394	244	247	153	641	398	Stage cancelled			
7	7 January	(Chile) Copiapó	(Chile) Copiapó	All	154	95	419	260	573	356	(Spain) M. Coma	(Argentina) A. Patronelli	(Qatar) N. Al-Attiyah	(Netherlands) G. de Rooy
	8 January	(Chile) Copiapó		Rest day										
8	9 January	(Chile) Copiapó	(Chile) Antofagasta	All	245	152	477	296	722	448	(Spain) M. Coma	(Argentina) M. Patronelli	(Spain) N. Roma	(Czech Republic) A. Loprais
9	10 January	(Chile) Antofagasta	(Chile) Iquique	All	9	5	556	345	565	351	(Portugal) H. Rodrigues	(Argentina) A. Patronelli	(United States) R. Gordon	(Italy) M. Biasion
10	11 January	(Chile) Iquique	(Chile) Arica	All	317	197	377	234	694	431	(Spain) J. Barreda	(Argentina) T. Maffei	(Spain) N. Roma	(Kazakhstan) A. Ardavichus
11	12 January	(Chile) Arica	(Peru) Arequipa	Bikes	171	106	534	331	705	438	(France) C. Despres	(Argentina) A. Patronelli	(France) S. Peterhansel ^{1}	(Russia) A. Karginov
11	12 January	(Chile) Arica	(Peru) Arequipa	Cars	120	74	478	297	598	371	(France) C. Despres	(Argentina) A. Patronelli	(France) S. Peterhansel ^{1}	(Russia) A. Karginov
11	12 January	(Chile) Arica	(Peru) Arequipa	Trucks	120	74	432	268	552	343	(France) C. Despres	(Argentina) A. Patronelli	(France) S. Peterhansel ^{1}	(Russia) A. Karginov
12	13 January	(Peru) Arequipa	(Peru) Nazca	Bikes	259	160	245	152	504	313	(Spain) M. Coma	(Argentina) M. Patronelli	(Russia) L. Novitskiy^{1}	(Netherlands) G. de Rooy
12	13 January	(Peru) Arequipa	(Peru) Nazca	Cars/Trucks	412	256	245	152	657	408	(Spain) M. Coma	(Argentina) M. Patronelli	(Russia) L. Novitskiy^{1}	(Netherlands) G. de Rooy
13	14 January	(Peru) Nazca	(Peru) Pisco	All	100	62	275	170	375	233	(Portugal) H. Rodrigues	(Argentina) T. Maffei	(France) S. Peterhansel	(Russia) A. Karginov
14	15 January	(Peru) Pisco	(Peru) Lima	All	254	157	29	18	283	175	(Norway) P. A. Ullevålseter	(Argentina) T. Maffei	(Portugal) R. Leal dos Santos^{1}	(Italy) M. Biasion
TOTALS					km	mi	km	mi	km	mi				
Bikes					4,019	2,497	4,372	2,717	8,391	5,214				
Cars					4,216	2,620	4,161	2,586	8,377	5,205				
Trucks					4,216	2,620	4,120	2,560	8,336	5,180				

Notes:

- ^1 — Robby Gordon forfeited these stage victories due to later losing the appeal for his disqualification after the tenth stage.

== Summary ==
=== Bikes ===
The competition in the category rapidly developed into a two-horse race between KTM riders Cyril Despres and Marc Coma, who between them had won each previous Dakar event since 2005. It was Coma who seized the advantage initially with a victory on stage two, but a navigational error during the third stage dropped him ten minutes behind Despres. The gap between the pair remained close to the ten-minute mark until Despres lost time by getting stuck in mud during the eighth stage, allowing Coma to re-take the lead. The battle remained extremely close for the following stages, with Coma and Despres exchanging the lead on two further occasions before the outcome of the battle was effectively settled during the thirteenth stage – Coma lost almost an hour to his rival, largely through the result of a 45-minute penalty for an engine change but also due to gearbox issues and further navigational trouble. That allowed Despres to take a comfortable victory over Coma by a margin of 53 minutes, with Yamaha rider Hélder Rodrigues, who had held third position since the fourth stage, a further 18 minutes behind the Spaniard having picked up two stage wins during the event. KTM riders Jordi Viladoms and Štefan Svitko completed the top five, with Pål Anders Ullevålseter, who won the final stage of the event, in sixth position. Francisco Lòpez, who won the opening stage, had been running in fourth but was forced to retire after the seventh stage due to a fall which aggravated a previous knee injury.

=== Quads ===
Sergio Lafuente took the first two-stage wins before losing an hour during the third stage. That handed the advantage briefly to Alejandro Patronelli, but his countryman Tomas Maffei seized the lead after victory in the fourth stage. However, both Maffei and Marcos Patronelli, brother of Alejandro, both effectively dropped out of contention when both lost considerable ground (54 minutes and 1 hour 20 minutes respectively) during the seventh stage, giving Alejandro Patronelli a lead of almost an hour after winning the stage. He took a further two stage wins en route to a comfortable victory in the overall classification by a margin of 1 hour and 20 minutes. Maffei lost second position in the ninth stage, and would finish in third overall despite winning the last two stages, 54 minutes down on the second of the Patronelli brothers. Completing the all-Yamaha, all-South American top five were Ignacio Casale, six hours adrift of the winning time, and Lafuente, who was another two hours further behind.

=== Cars ===
With the withdrawal of the Volkswagen Motorsport works team, the first privateer winner since Jean-Louis Schlesser in 2000 was assured. The all-new X-Raid Mini All4 proved immediately competitive, with Leonid Novitskiy winning the first stage, Nani Roma winning the third stage and nine-time Dakar winner Stéphane Peterhansel re-taking the lead of the overall classification after taking victory in the fourth stage. Krzysztof Hołowczyc, also at the wheel of a Mini, held second behind Peterhansel after winning the fifth stage and remained inside the top three until power steering failure during the tenth stage ruled him out of contention.

Roma then became Peterhansel's closest rival, with 19 minutes separating the pair after the Spaniard's win in the tenth stage. Roma would eventually finish the rally in second position, 40 minutes down on his teammate after getting stuck in sand dunes on the penultimate stage, with Peterhansel taking his tenth Dakar victory after adding to his stage win tally during the penultimate stage. 2009 winner Giniel de Villiers, driving a Toyota Hilux, finished a distant third overall, 32 minutes behind Roma, having failed to win any stages. Novitskiy was classified in fourth position after winning stage twelve, albeit over two hours behind Peterhansel.

It was an event to forget for defending champion Nasser Al-Attiyah. He lost nine minutes during the first stage after his Hummer's engine lost oil pressure. The Qatari went on to win the second stage, but lost over half an hour to Peterhansel in the fourth stage; winning the seventh stage had seen Al-Attiyah recover to sixth place before engine and alternator problems during the ninth stage warranted his retirement. Teammate Robby Gordon was at this stage just five minutes behind Peterhansel with a win on the ninth stage, but the gap increased to 20 minutes when the American hit a rock on the tenth stage. An illegal modification to his Hummer's engine then saw Gordon disqualified, though he continued to compete under appeal for the remainder of the rally. He would have finished fifth in the overall classification with three further stage wins, Toyota driver Lucio Alvarez inheriting the position as a result of Gordon losing the appeal.

=== Trucks ===
Never outside the top two of the overall classification, the event was dominated by Iveco driver Gérard de Rooy. After finishing second to fellow Dutch competitor Marcel van Vliet in the opening stage, de Rooy won the second to lead the overall classification and re-took the lead after victory in the fourth stage. He consolidated his lead with two more successive stage victories, opening a 15-minute advantage over Aleš Loprais before the Tatra driver was forced to retire after an accident in the non-timed section of the ninth stage. De Rooy then held a 47-minute advantage over teammate Hans Stacey, a gap he extended to 51 minutes by the end of the event with a final stage victory in the twelfth stage. Stacey secured second in the overall standings despite not having won any stages, with Artur Ardavichus the best of the Kamaz entries in third position – 1 hour and 47 minutes down on de Rooy with victory in the tenth stage to his credit.

Eduard Nikolaev, taking over as de facto Kamaz team leader after the retirement of Vladimir Chagin and Firdaus Kabirov, was excluded for an incident with a competitor in the car category during the fourth stage. Kamaz drivers Andrey Karginov, who won the eleventh stage, and Ilgizar Mardeev completed the top five. Former World Rally champion Miki Biasion was running third before losing over six hours during a torrid seventh stage, though the Italian won two more stages (to add to his victory on the third stage) en route to recovering to sixth place overall.

== Stage results ==
=== Bikes ===
	Stage result					General classification				
Stage	Pos	Competitor	Make	Time	Difference	Pos	Competitor	Make	Time	Difference
1	1	(Chile) Francisco López	Aprilia	32:37		1	(Chile) Francisco López	Aprilia	32:37	
1	2	(Spain) Marc Coma	KTM	32:51	0:14	2	(Spain) Marc Coma	KTM	32:51	0:14
1	3	(Argentina) Javier Pizzolito	Honda	33:04	0:27	3	(Argentina) Javier Pizzolito	Honda	33:04	0:27
2	1	(Spain) Marc Coma	KTM	3:07:31		1	(Spain) Marc Coma	KTM	3:40:12	
2	2	(France) Cyril Despres	KTM	3:08:39	1:18	2	(Chile) Francisco Lòpez	Aprilia	3:42:42	2:30
2	3	(Spain) Joan Barreda	Husqvarna	3:09:54	2:33	3	(France) Cyril Despres	KTM	3:43:04	2:52
3	1	(France) Cyril Despres	KTM	3:48:38		1	(France) Cyril Despres	KTM	7:31:42	
3	2	(Netherlands) Frans Verhoeven	Sherco	3:57:15	8:37	2	(Spain) Marc Coma	KTM	7:41:54	10:12
3	3	(Portugal) Paulo Gonçalves	Husqvarna	3:57:17	8:39	3	(France) David Casteu	Yamaha	7:48:58	17:16
4	1	(Spain) Marc Coma	KTM	4:16:43		1	(France) Cyril Despres	KTM	11:50:27	
4	2	(France) Cyril Despres	KTM	4:18:54	2:02	2	(Spain) Marc Coma	KTM	11:58:37	8:10
4	3	(Netherlands) Frans Verhoeven	Sherco	4:25:09	8:26	3	(Portugal) Hélder Rodrigues	Yamaha	12:17:15	26:48
5	1	(France) Cyril Despres	KTM	2:28:33		1	(France) Cyril Despres	KTM	14:19:00	
5	2	(Spain) Marc Coma	KTM	2:30:14	1:41	2	(Spain) Marc Coma	KTM	14:28:51	9:51
5	3	(Spain) Joan Barreda	Husqvarna	2:41:15	12:42	3	(Portugal) Hélder Rodrigues	Yamaha	15:06:56	47:56
6	Stage cancelled									
7	1	(Spain) Marc Coma	KTM	3:51:35		1	(France) Cyril Despres	KTM	18:12:38	
7	2	(France) Cyril Despres	KTM	3:53:38	2:03	2	(Spain) Marc Coma	KTM	18:20:26	7:48
7	3	(Portugal) Paulo Gonçalves	Husqvarna	3:54:24	2:49	3	(Portugal) Hélder Rodrigues	Yamaha	19:02:17	49:39
8	1	(Spain) Marc Coma	KTM	5:03:52		1	(Spain) Marc Coma	KTM	23:24:18	
8	2	(Norway) Pål Anders Ullevålseter	KTM	5:05:47	1:55	2	(France) Cyril Despres	KTM	23:25:44	1:26
8	3	(Portugal) Ruben Faria	Husqvarna	5:10:52	7:00	3	(Portugal) Hélder Rodrigues	Yamaha	24:13:19	49:01
9	1	(Portugal) Hélder Rodrigues	Yamaha	5:16:17		1	(France) Cyril Despres	KTM	28:45:17	
9	2	(France) Cyril Despres	KTM	5:19:33	3:16	2	(Spain) Marc Coma	KTM	28:47:45	2:28
9	3	(Slovakia) Štefan Svitko	KTM	5:20:25	4:35	3	(Portugal) Hélder Rodrigues	Yamaha	29:29:36	44:19
10	1	(Spain) Joan Barreda	Husqvarna	4:18:43		1	(France) Cyril Despres	KTM	33:07:39	
10	2	(Spain) Marc Coma	KTM	4:20:15	1:32	2	(Spain) Marc Coma	KTM	33:08:00	0:21
10	3	(France) Cyril Despres	KTM	4:22:22	3:39	3	(Portugal) Hélder Rodrigues	Yamaha	33:53:35	45:56
11	1	(France) Cyril Despres	KTM	4:03:37		1	(France) Cyril Despres	KTM	37:11.16	
11	2	(Spain) Gerard Farrés	KTM	4:05:16	1:39	2	(Spain) Marc Coma	KTM	37:13:38	2:22
11	3	(Spain) Marc Coma	KTM	4:05:38	2:01	3	(Portugal) Hélder Rodrigues	Yamaha	38:19:56	1:34:56
12	1	(Spain) Marc Coma	KTM	2:24:38		1	(Spain) Marc Coma	KTM	39:38:16	
12	2	(Spain) Joan Barreda	Husqvarna	2:27:21	2:43	2	(France) Cyril Despres	KTM	39:39:51	1:35
12	3	(Spain) Jordi Viladoms	KTM	2:27:48	3:10	3	(Portugal) Hélder Rodrigues	Yamaha	40:52:05	1:13:49
13	1	(Portugal) Hélder Rodrigues	Yamaha	3:21:16		1	(France) Cyril Despres	KTM	43:01:54	
13	2	(France) Cyril Despres	KTM	3:22:03	0:47	2	(Spain) Marc Coma	KTM	43:57:57	0:56:03
13	3	(Spain) Jordi Viladoms	KTM	3:24:16	3:00	3	(Portugal) Hélder Rodrigues	Yamaha	44:13:21	1:11:27
14	1	(Norway) Pål Anders Ullevålseter	KTM	0:22:26		1	(France) Cyril Despres	KTM	43:28:11	
14	2	(Spain) Marc Coma	KTM	00:23:34	01:08	2	(Spain) Marc Coma	KTM	44:21:31	0:53:20
14	3	(Slovakia) Štefan Svitko	KTM	00:24:09	01:43	3	(Portugal) Hélder Rodrigues	Yamaha	44:39:28	1:11:17

=== Quads ===
	Stage result					General classification				
Stage	Pos	Competitor	Make	Time	Difference	Pos	Competitor	Make	Time	Difference
1	1	(Uruguay) Sergio Lafuente	Yamaha	40:13		1	(Uruguay) Sergio Lafuente	Yamaha	40:13	
1	2	(Argentina) Marcos Patronelli	Yamaha	41:07	0:54	2	(Argentina) Marcos Patronelli	Yamaha	41:07	0:54
1	3	(Argentina) Tomas Maffei	Yamaha	41:20	1:07	3	(Argentina) Tomas Maffei	Yamaha	41:20	1:07
2	1	(Uruguay) Sergio Lafuente	Yamaha	3:49:56		1	(Uruguay) Sergio Lafuente	Yamaha	4:30:09	
2	2	(Argentina) Alejandro Patronelli	Yamaha	3:54:04	4:08	2	(Argentina) Alejandro Patronelli	Yamaha	4:36:43	6:34
2	3	(Argentina) Tomas Maffei	Yamaha	3:58:31	8:35	3	(Argentina) Tomas Maffei	Yamaha	4:39:51	9:42
3	1	(Argentina) Marcos Patronelli	Yamaha	4:53:29		1	(Argentina) Alejandro Patronelli	Yamaha	9:32:31	
3	2	(Argentina) Tomas Maffei	Yamaha	4:55:21	1:52	2	(Argentina) Marcos Patronelli	Yamaha	9:33:26	0:55
3	3	(Argentina) Alejandro Patronelli	Yamaha	4:55:48	2:19	3	(Argentina) Tomas Maffei	Yamaha	9:35:12	2:41
4	1	(Argentina) Tomas Maffei	Yamaha	5:13:30		1	(Argentina) Tomas Maffei	Yamaha	14:48:11	
4	2	(Argentina) Alejandro Patronelli	Yamaha	5:19:03	5:33	2	(Argentina) Alejandro Patronelli	Yamaha	14:51:34	2:52
4	3	(Argentina) Marcos Patronelli	Yamaha	5:21:26	7:56	3	(Argentina) Marcos Patronelli	Yamaha	14:54:52	6:10
5	1	(Argentina) Marcos Patronelli	Yamaha	2:58:37		1	(Argentina) Tomas Maffei	Yamaha	17:51:27	
5	2	(Argentina) Alejandro Patronelli	Yamaha	3:00:28	1:51	2	(Argentina) Alejandro Patronelli	Yamaha	17:52:02	0:35
5	3	(Argentina) Tomas Maffei	Yamaha	3:02:45	4:08	3	(Argentina) Marcos Patronelli	Yamaha	17:53:29	2:02
6	Stage cancelled									
7	1	(Argentina) Alejandro Patronelli	Yamaha	4:36:16		1	(Argentina) Alejandro Patronelli	Yamaha	22:28:18	
7	2	(Chile) Ignacio Casale	Yamaha	4:53:26	17:10	2	(Argentina) Tomas Maffei	Yamaha	23:27:11	58:53
7	3	(Uruguay) Sergio Lafuente	Yamaha	5:10:15	33:59	3	(Argentina) Marcos Patronelli	Yamaha	23:49:53	1:21:35
8	1	(Argentina) Marcos Patronelli	Yamaha	6:14:07		1	(Argentina) Alejandro Patronelli	Yamaha	28:45:03	
8	2	(Argentina) Alejandro Patronelli	Yamaha	6:16:45	2:38	2	(Argentina) Tomas Maffei	Yamaha	29:51:08	1:06:05
8	3	(Argentina) Tomas Maffei	Yamaha	6:23:57	9:50	3	(Argentina) Marcos Patronelli	Yamaha	30:04:00	1:18:57
9	1	(Argentina) Alejandro Patronelli	Yamaha	6:21:18		1	(Argentina) Alejandro Patronelli	Yamaha	35:06:21	
9	2	(Argentina) Marcos Patronelli	Yamaha	6:22:20	1:02	2	(Argentina) Marcos Patronelli	Yamaha	37:26:20	1:19:59
9	3	(Argentina) Tomas Maffei	Yamaha	7:05:25	44:07	3	(Argentina) Tomas Maffei	Yamaha	37:56:33	1:50:12
10	1	(Argentina) Tomas Maffei	Yamaha	5:10:08		1	(Argentina) Alejandro Patronelli	Yamaha	40:29:55	
10	2	(Argentina) Marcos Patronelli	Yamaha	5:23:04	12:56	2	(Argentina) Marcos Patronelli	Yamaha	41:49:24	1:19:29
10	3	(Argentina) Alejandro Patronelli	Yamaha	5:23:34	13:26	3	(Argentina) Tomas Maffei	Yamaha	42:06:41	1:36:46
11	1	(Argentina) Alejandro Patronelli	Yamaha	4:53:45		1	(Argentina) Alejandro Patronelli	Yamaha	45:23:40	
11	2	(Argentina) Marcos Patronelli	Yamaha	4:54:16	0:31	2	(Argentina) Marcos Patronelli	Yamaha	46:43:40	1:20:00
11	3	(Argentina) Tomas Maffei	Yamaha	5:12:42	18:57	3	(Argentina) Tomas Maffei	Yamaha	47:34:23	2:10:43
12	1	(Argentina) Marcos Patronelli	Yamaha	2:57:29		1	(Argentina) Alejandro Patronelli	Yamaha	48:21:51	
12	2	(Argentina) Alejandro Patronelli	Yamaha	2:58:11	0:42	2	(Argentina) Marcos Patronelli	Yamaha	49:41:09	1:19:18
12	3	(Argentina) Tomas Maffei	Yamaha	3:11:23	13:54	3	(Argentina) Tomas Maffei	Yamaha	50:45:46	2:23:55
13	1	(Argentina) Tomas Maffei	Yamaha	4:00:42		1	(Argentina) Alejandro Patronelli	Yamaha	52:30:49	
13	2	(Uruguay) Sergio Lafuente	Yamaha	4:07:46	7:04	2	(Argentina) Marcos Patronelli	Yamaha	53:50:37	1:19:48
13	3	(Argentina) Alejandro Patronelli	Yamaha	4:08:58	8:12	3	(Argentina) Tomas Maffei	Yamaha	54:46:28	2:15:39
14	1	(Argentina) Tomas Maffei	Yamaha	0:29:44		1	(Argentina) Alejandro Patronelli	Yamaha	53:01:47	
14	2	(Uruguay) Sergio Lafuente	Yamaha	0:30:33	0:49	2	(Argentina) Marcos Patronelli	Yamaha	54:22:08	1:20:17
14	3	(Argentina) Alejandro Patronelli	Yamaha	0:31:02	1:18	3	(Argentina) Tomas Maffei	Yamaha	55:16:12	2:14:21

=== Cars ===
	Stage result					General classification				
Stage	Pos	Competitor	Make	Time	Difference	Pos	Competitor	Make	Time	Difference
1	1	(Russia) Leonid Novitskiy (Germany) Andreas Schulz	Mini	32:12		1	(Russia) Leonid Novitskiy (Germany) Andreas Schulz	Mini	32:12	
1	2	(Poland) Krzysztof Hołowczyc (Belgium) Jean-Marc Fortin	Mini	32:17	0:05	2	(Poland) Krzysztof Hołowczyc (Belgium) Jean-Marc Fortin	Mini	32:17	0:05
1	3	(France) Stéphane Peterhansel (France) Jean-Paul Cottret	Mini	32:21	0:09	3	(France) Stéphane Peterhansel (France) Jean-Paul Cottret	Mini	32:21	0:09
2	1	(Qatar) Nasser Al-Attiyah (Spain) Lucas Cruz	Hummer	2:47:18		1	(France) Stéphane Peterhansel (France) Jean-Paul Cottret	Mini	3:20:33	
2	2	(France) Stéphane Peterhansel (France) Jean-Paul Cottret	Mini	2:48:12	0:54	2	(United States) Robby Gordon (United States) Johnny Campbell	Hummer	3:23:01	2:28
2	3	(United States) Robby Gordon (United States) Johnny Campbell	Hummer	2:50:00	2:42	3	(Poland) Krzysztof Hołowczyc (Belgium) Jean-Marc Fortin	Mini	3:23:06	2:33
3	1	(Spain) Joan Roma (France) Michel Périn	Mini	2:26:51		1	(Poland) Krzysztof Hołowczyc (Belgium) Jean-Marc Fortin	Mini	5:51:06	
3	2	(Poland) Krzysztof Hołowczyc (Belgium) Jean-Marc Fortin	Mini	2:28:00	1:09	2	(United States) Robby Gordon (United States) Johnny Campbell	Hummer	5:52:00	0:54
3	3	(Qatar) Nasser Al-Attiyah (Spain) Lucas Cruz	Hummer	2:28:20	1:29	3	(South Africa) Giniel de Villiers (Germany) Dirk von Zitzewitz	Toyota	5:52:46	1:40
4	1	(France) Stéphane Peterhansel (France) Jean-Paul Cottret	Mini	3:49:33		1	(France) Stéphane Peterhansel (France) Jean-Paul Cottret	Mini	9:43:20	
4	2	(Argentina) Orlando Terranova (United States) Andy Grider	Toyota	3:54:52	5:19	2	(South Africa) Giniel de Villiers (Germany) Dirk von Zitzewitz	Toyota	9:49:01	5:41
4	3	(South Africa) Giniel de Villiers (Germany) Dirk von Zitzewitz	Toyota	3:56:15	6:42	3	(Spain) Joan Roma (France) Michel Périn	Mini	9:50:04	6:44
5	1	(Poland) Krzysztof Hołowczyc (Belgium) Jean-Marc Fortin	Mini	2:10:51		1	(France) Stéphane Peterhansel (France) Jean-Paul Cottret	Mini	11:58:03	
5	2	(United States) Robby Gordon (United States) Johnny Campbell	Hummer	2:11:52	1:01	2	(Poland) Krzysztof Hołowczyc (Belgium) Jean-Marc Fortin	Mini	12:02:21	4:18
5	3	(France) Stéphane Peterhansel (France) Jean-Paul Cottret	Mini	2:14:43	3:52	3	(Spain) Joan Roma (France) Michel Périn	Mini	12:08:42	10:39
6	Stage cancelled									
7	1	(Qatar) Nasser Al-Attiyah (Spain) Lucas Cruz	Hummer	3:26:57		1	(France) Stéphane Peterhansel (France) Jean-Paul Cottret	Mini	15:32:53	
7	2	(United States) Robby Gordon (United States) Johnny Campbell	Hummer	3:34:27	7:30	2	(Poland) Krzysztof Hołowczyc (Belgium) Jean-Marc Fortin	Mini	15:44:15	11:22
7	3	(France) Stéphane Peterhansel (France) Jean-Paul Cottret	Mini	3:34:50	7:53	3	(United States) Robby Gordon (United States) Johnny Campbell	Hummer	15:46:02	13:09
8	1	(Spain) Joan Roma (France) Michel Périn	Mini	4:25:44		1	(France) Stéphane Peterhansel (France) Jean-Paul Cottret	Mini	20:04:15	
8	2	(United States) Robby Gordon (United States) Johnny Campbell	Hummer	4:25:49	0:05	2	(United States) Robby Gordon (United States) Johnny Campbell	Hummer	20:11:51	7:36
8	3	(Poland) Krzysztof Hołowczyc (Belgium) Jean-Marc Fortin	Mini	4:27:48	2:04	3	(Poland) Krzysztof Hołowczyc (Belgium) Jean-Marc Fortin	Mini	20:12:03	7:48
9	1	(United States) Robby Gordon (United States) Johnny Campbell	Hummer	4:35:21		1	(France) Stéphane Peterhansel (France) Jean-Paul Cottret	Mini	24:41:14	
9	2	(France) Stéphane Peterhansel (France) Jean-Paul Cottret	Mini	4:36:59	1:38	2	(United States) Robby Gordon (United States) Johnny Campbell	Hummer	24:47:12	5:58
9	3	(Spain) Joan Roma (France) Michel Périn	Mini	4:43:58	8:37	3	(Poland) Krzysztof Hołowczyc (Belgium) Jean-Marc Fortin	Mini	24:58:03	16:49
10	1	(Spain) Joan Roma (France) Michel Périn	Mini	3:59:37		1	(France) Stéphane Peterhansel (France) Jean-Paul Cottret	Mini	28:41:12	
10	2	(France) Stéphane Peterhansel (France) Jean-Paul Cottret	Mini	3:59:58	0:21	2	(Spain) Joan Roma (France) Michel Périn	Mini	29:00:17	19:05
10	3	(South Africa) Giniel de Villiers (Germany) Dirk von Zitzewitz	Toyota	4:07:21	7:44	3	(South Africa) Giniel de Villiers (Germany) Dirk von Zitzewitz	Toyota	29:42:45	1:01:33
11	1	(France) Stéphane Peterhansel (France) Jean-Paul Cottret	Mini	3:56:53		1	(France) Stéphane Peterhansel (France) Jean-Paul Cottret	Mini	32:38:05	
11	2	(Spain) Joan Roma (France) Michel Périn	Mini	4:00:37	3:44	2	(Spain) Joan Roma (France) Michel Périn	Mini	33:00:54	22:49
11	3	(Portugal) Ricardo Leal dos Santos (Portugal) Paulo Fiuza	Mini	4:05:49	8:56	3	(South Africa) Giniel de Villiers (Germany) Dirk von Zitzewitz	Toyota	9:49:06	1:11:01
12	1	(Russia) Leonid Novitskiy (Germany) Andreas Schulz	Mini	2:29:50		1	(France) Stéphane Peterhansel (France) Jean-Paul Cottret	Mini	35:19:04	
12	2	(South Africa) Giniel de Villiers (Germany) Dirk von Zitzewitz	Toyota	2:36:38	6:48	2	(Spain) Joan Roma (France) Michel Périn	Mini	35:39:04	20:00
12	3	(Netherlands) Bernhard ten Brinke (France) Matthieu Baumel	Mitsubishi	2:37:47	7:57	3	(South Africa) Giniel de Villiers (Germany) Dirk von Zitzewitz	Toyota	36:25:44	1:06:40
13	1	(France) Stéphane Peterhansel (France) Jean-Paul Cottret	Mini	3:09:47		1	(France) Stéphane Peterhansel (France) Jean-Paul Cottret	Mini	38:28:51	
13	2	(South Africa) Giniel de Villiers (Germany) Dirk von Zitzewitz	Toyota	3:18:16	8:29	2	(Spain) Joan Roma (France) Michel Périn	Mini	39:11:48	42:57
13	3	(Russia) Leonid Novitskiy (Germany) Andreas Schulz	Mini	3:22:42	12:55	3	(South Africa) Giniel de Villiers (Germany) Dirk von Zitzewitz	Toyota	39:44:00	1:15:09
14	1	(Portugal) Ricardo Leal dos Santos (Portugal) Paulo Fiuza	Mini	23:04		1	(France) Stéphane Peterhansel (France) Jean-Paul Cottret	Mini	38:54:46	
14	2	(Poland) Krzysztof Hołowczyc (Belgium) Jean-Marc Fortin	Mini	23:21	0:17	2	(Spain) Joan Roma (France) Michel Périn	Mini	39:36:42	41:56
14	3	(South Africa) Giniel de Villiers (Germany) Dirk von Zitzewitz	Toyota	24:11	1:07	3	(South Africa) Giniel de Villiers (Germany) Dirk von Zitzewitz	Toyota	40:08:11	1:13:25

=== Trucks ===
	Stage result					General classification				
Stage	Pos	Competitor	Make	Time	Difference	Pos	Competitor	Make	Time	Difference
1	1	(Netherlands) Marcel van Vliet (Netherlands) Bell Peter (Belgium) Serge Bruynkens	MAN	37:45		1	(Netherlands) Marcel van Vliet (Netherlands) Bell Peter (Belgium) Serge Bruynkens	MAN	37:45	
1	2	(Netherlands) Gérard de Rooy (Poland) Dariusz Rodewald (Belgium) Tom Colsoul	Iveco	38:11	0:26	2	(Netherlands) Gérard de Rooy (Poland) Dariusz Rodewald (Belgium) Tom Colsoul	Iveco	38:11	0:26
1	3	(Germany) Franz Echter (Germany) Detlef Ruf (Germany) Artur Klein	MAN	38:41	0:56	3	(Germany) Franz Echter (Germany) Detlef Ruf (Germany) Artur Klein	MAN	38:41	0:56
2	1	(Netherlands) Gérard de Rooy (Poland) Dariusz Rodewald (Belgium) Tom Colsoul	Iveco	3:10:00		1	(Netherlands) Gérard de Rooy (Poland) Dariusz Rodewald (Belgium) Tom Colsoul	Iveco	3:48:11	
2	2	(Russia) Eduard Nikolaev (Russia) Sergey Savostin (Russia) Vladimir Rybakov	Kamaz	3:13:21	3:21	2	(Russia) Eduard Nikolaev (Russia) Sergey Savostin (Russia) Vladimir Rybakov	Kamaz	3:53:41	5:30
2	3	(Netherlands) Hans Stacey (Netherlands) Hans van Goor (Netherlands) Bernard der Kinderen	Iveco	3:14:56	4:56	3	(Netherlands) Hans Stacey (Netherlands) Hans van Goor (Netherlands) Bernard der Kinderen	Iveco	3:54:00	5:49
3	1	(Italy) Miki Biasion (Netherlands) Michel Huisman (Italy) Giorgio Albiero	Iveco	2:50:53		1	(Kazakhstan) Artur Ardavichus (Russia) Alexey Kuzmich (Kazakhstan) Nurlan Turlubaev	Kamaz	6:47:33	
3	2	(Kazakhstan) Artur Ardavichus (Russia) Alexey Kuzmich (Kazakhstan) Nurlan Turlubaev	Kamaz	2:52:02	1:09	2	(Netherlands) Gérard de Rooy (Poland) Dariusz Rodewald (Belgium) Tom Colsoul	Iveco	6:48:01	0:28
3	3	(Russia) Andrey Karginov (Russia) Igor Devyatkin (Russia) Andrey Mokeev	Kamaz	2:53:12	2:19	3	(Italy) Miki Biasion (Netherlands) Michel Huisman (Italy) Giorgio Albiero	Iveco	6:49:24	1:51
4	1	(Netherlands) Gérard de Rooy (Poland) Dariusz Rodewald (Belgium) Tom Colsoul	Iveco	4:22:12		1	(Netherlands) Gérard de Rooy (Poland) Dariusz Rodewald (Belgium) Tom Colsoul	Iveco	11:10:13	
4	2	(Netherlands) Hans Stacey (Netherlands) Hans van Goor (Netherlands) Bernard der Kinderen	Iveco	4:23:25	1:13	2	(Netherlands) Hans Stacey (Netherlands) Hans van Goor (Netherlands) Bernard der Kinderen	Iveco	11:12:55	2:42
4	3	(Italy) Miki Biasion (Netherlands) Michel Huisman (Italy) Giorgio Albiero	Iveco	4:23:55	1:43	3	(Italy) Miki Biasion (Netherlands) Michel Huisman (Italy) Giorgio Albiero	Iveco	11:13:19	3:06
5	1	(Netherlands) Gérard de Rooy (Poland) Dariusz Rodewald (Belgium) Tom Colsoul	Iveco	2:34:30		1	(Netherlands) Gérard de Rooy (Poland) Dariusz Rodewald (Belgium) Tom Colsoul	Iveco	13:44:43	
5	2	(Czech Republic) Aleš Loprais (Czech Republic) Petr Almáši (Czech Republic) Michael Ernst	Tatra	2:34:44	0:14	2	(Netherlands) Hans Stacey (Netherlands) Hans van Goor (Netherlands) Bernard der Kinderen	Iveco	13:49:04	4:21
5	3	(Italy) Miki Biasion (Netherlands) Michel Huisman (Italy) Giorgio Albiero	Iveco	2:35:49	1:19	3	(Italy) Miki Biason (Netherlands) Michel Huisman (Italy) Giorgio Albiero	Iveco	13:49:08	4:25
6	Stage cancelled									
7	1	(Netherlands) Gérard de Rooy (Poland) Dariusz Rodewald (Belgium) Tom Colsoul	Iveco	4:20:32		1	(Netherlands) Gérard de Rooy (Poland) Dariusz Rodewald (Belgium) Tom Colsoul	Iveco	18:05:15	
7	2	(Czech Republic) Aleš Loprais (Czech Republic) Petr Almáši (Czech Republic) Michael Ernst	Tatra	4:24:31	3:59	2	(Czech Republic) Aleš Loprais (Czech Republic) Petr Almáši (Czech Republic) Michael Ernst	Tatra	18:22:25	17:10
7	3	(Russia) Andrey Karginov (Russia) Igor Devyatkin (Russia) Andrey Mokeev	Kamaz	4:37:04	16:32	3	(Netherlands) Hans Stacey (Netherlands) Hans van Goor (Netherlands) Bernard der Kinderen	Iveco	18:38:29	33:14
8	1	(Czech Republic) Aleš Loprais (Czech Republic) Petr Almáši (Czech Republic) Michael Ernst	Tatra	5:07:17		1	(Netherlands) Gérard de Rooy (Poland) Dariusz Rodewald (Belgium) Tom Colsoul	Iveco	23:14:03	
8	2	(Netherlands) Gérard de Rooy (Poland) Dariusz Rodewald (Belgium) Tom Colsoul	Iveco	5:08:48	1:31	2	(Czech Republic) Aleš Loprais (Czech Republic) Petr Almáši (Czech Republic) Michael Ernst	Tatra	23:29:42	15:39
8	3	(Italy) Miki Biasion (Netherlands) Michel Huisman (Italy) Giorgio Albiero	Iveco	5:19:37	12:20	3	(Netherlands) Hans Stacey (Netherlands) Hans van Goor (Netherlands) Bernard der Kinderen	Iveco	24:02:09	48:06
9	1	(Italy) Miki Biasion (Netherlands) Michel Huisman (Italy) Giorgio Albiero	Iveco	5:29:02		1	(Netherlands) Gérard de Rooy (Poland) Dariusz Rodewald (Belgium) Tom Colsoul	Iveco	28:43:59	
9	2	(Netherlands) Hans Stacey (Netherlands) Hans van Goor (Netherlands) Bernard der Kinderen	Iveco	5:29:22	0:20	2	(Netherlands) Hans Stacey (Netherlands) Hans van Goor (Netherlands) Bernard der Kinderen	Iveco	29:31:31	47:32
9	3	(Netherlands) Gérard de Rooy (Poland) Dariusz Rodewald (Belgium) Tom Colsoul	Iveco	5:29:56	0:54	3	(Kazakhstan) Artur Ardavichus (Russia) Alexey Kuzmich (Kazakhstan) Nurlan Turlubaev	Kamaz	29:50:39	1:06:40
10	1	(Kazakhstan) Artur Ardavichus (Russia) Alexey Kuzmich (Kazakhstan) Nurlan Turlubaev	Kamaz	5:06:11		1	(Netherlands) Gérard de Rooy (Poland) Dariusz Rodewald (Belgium) Tom Colsoul	Iveco	33:52:33	
10	2	(Russia) Andrey Karginov (Russia) Igor Devyatkin (Russia) Andrey Mokeev	Kamaz	5:08:29	2:18	2	(Netherlands) Hans Stacey (Netherlands) Hans van Goor (Netherlands) Bernard der Kinderen	Iveco	34:52:00	59:27
10	3	(Netherlands) Gérard de Rooy (Poland) Dariusz Rodewald (Belgium) Tom Colsoul	Iveco	5:08:34	2:23	3	(Kazakhstan) Artur Ardavichus (Russia) Alexey Kuzmich (Kazakhstan) Nurlan Turlubaev	Kamaz	10:56:50	1:04:17
11	1	(Russia) Andrey Karginov (Russia) Igor Devyatkin (Russia) Andrey Mokeev	Kamaz	3:52:50		1	(Netherlands) Gérard de Rooy (Poland) Dariusz Rodewald (Belgium) Tom Colsoul	Iveco	37:51:55	
11	2	(Netherlands) Hans Stacey (Netherlands) Hans van Goor (Netherlands) Bernard der Kinderen	Iveco	3:55:53	3:03	2	(Netherlands) Hans Stacey (Netherlands) Hans van Goor (Netherlands) Bernard der Kinderen	Iveco	38:47:53	55:58
11	3	(Italy) Miki Biasion (Netherlands) Michel Huisman (Italy) Giorgio Albiero	Iveco	3:57:52	5:02	3	(Kazakhstan) Artur Ardavichus (Russia) Alexey Kuzmich (Kazakhstan) Nurlan Turlubaev	Kamaz	39:12:24	1:20:29
12	1	(Netherlands) Gérard de Rooy (Poland) Dariusz Rodewald (Belgium) Tom Colsoul	Iveco	2:59:00		1	(Netherlands) Gérard de Rooy (Poland) Dariusz Rodewald (Belgium) Tom Colsoul	Iveco	40:50:55	
12	2	(Netherlands) Hans Stacey (Netherlands) Hans van Goor (Netherlands) Bernard der Kinderen	Iveco	2:59:32	0:32	2	(Netherlands) Hans Stacey (Netherlands) Hans van Goor (Netherlands) Bernard der Kinderen	Iveco	41:47:25	56:30
12	3	(Italy) Miki Biasion (Netherlands) Michel Huisman (Italy) Giorgio Albiero	Iveco	2:59:32	0:32	3	(Kazakhstan) Artur Ardavichus (Russia) Alexey Kuzmich (Kazakhstan) Nurlan Turlubaev	Kamaz	42:30:38	1:39:43
13	1	(Russia) Andrey Karginov (Russia) Igor Devyatkin (Russia) Andrey Mokeev	Kamaz	3:33:27		1	(Netherlands) Gérard de Rooy (Poland) Dariusz Rodewald (Belgium) Tom Colsoul	Iveco	44:49:45	
13	2	(Brazil) André de Azevedo (Brazil) Maykel Justo (Czech Republic) Jaromír Martinec	Tatra	3:53:41	0:20	2	(Netherlands) Hans Stacey (Netherlands) Hans van Goor (Netherlands) Bernard der Kinderen	Iveco	45:43:01	53:16
13	3	(Netherlands) Hans Stacey (Netherlands) Hans van Goor (Netherlands) Bernard der Kinderen	Iveco	3:55:36	0:22	3	(Kazakhstan) Artur Ardavichus (Russia) Alexey Kuzmich (Kazakhstan) Nurlan Turlubaev	Kamaz	46:38:10	1:48:25
14	1	(Italy) Miki Biasion (Netherlands) Michel Huisman (Italy) Giorgio Albiero	Iveco	0:27:22		1	(Netherlands) Gérard de Rooy (Poland) Dariusz Rodewald (Belgium) Tom Colsoul	Iveco	45:20:47	
14	2	(Russia) Ilgizar Mardeev (Russia) Vyatcheslav Mizyukaev (Russia) Dmitry Sotnikov	Kamaz	0:28:48	0:01	2	(Netherlands) Hans Stacey (Netherlands) Hans van Goor (Netherlands) Bernard der Kinderen	Iveco	46:12:06	51:19
14	3	(Netherlands) Hans Stacey (Netherlands) Hans van Goor (Netherlands) Bernard der Kinderen	Iveco	0:29:05	0:02	3	(Kazakhstan) Artur Ardavichus (Russia) Alexey Kuzmich (Kazakhstan) Nurlan Turlubaev	Kamaz	47:08:32	1:47:45

== Final standings ==
=== Bikes ===
Pos	No.	Rider	Bike	Entrant	Time
1	2	(France) Cyril Despres	KTM 450 Rally	Team Red Bull KTM	43:28:11
2	1	(Spain) Marc Coma	KTM 450 Rally	KTM MRW Rally Factory Team	+53:20
3	3	(Portugal) Hélder Rodrigues	Yamaha	Team Red Bull Yamaha TMN	+1:11:17
4	10	(Spain) Jordi Viladoms	KTM 450 Rally	Bordone-Ferrari	+1:40:56
5	32	(Slovakia) Štefan Svitko	KTM 450 Rally	Hant Logomotion Slovakia	+1:47:28
6	6	(Norway) Pål Anders Ullevålseter	KTM 450 Rally	Team Ullevålseter	+2:11:56
7	20	(Spain) Gerard Farrés	KTM 450 Rally	Bordone-Ferrari	+2:14:22
8	34	(Italy) Alessandro Botturi	KTM 450 Rally	Bordone-Ferrari	+2:59:04
9	16	(France) Olivier Pain	Yamaha	Yamaha Racing France	+3:17:50
10	28	(Brazil) Felipe Zanol	KTM 450 Rally	KTM Brasil	+3:25:56

=== Quads ===
Pos	No.	Rider	Quad	Time
1	250	(Argentina) Alejandro Patronelli	Yamaha	53:01:11
2	252	(Argentina) Marcos Patronelli	Yamaha	+1:20:17
3	257	(Argentina) Tomas Maffei	Yamaha	+2:14:21
4	264	(Chile) Ignacio Casale	Yamaha	+6:09:23
5	263	(Uruguay) Sergio Lafuente	Yamaha	+8:19:06
6	278	(Italy) Roberto Tonetti	Yamaha	+12:43:38
7	282	(Argentina) Lucas Bonetto	Honda	+13:33:14
8	260	(Argentina) Daniel Mazzucco	Can-Am	+13:37:59
9	259	(Italy) Camélia Liparoti	Yamaha	+14:15:10
10	276	(Chile) Barry Cruces	Can-Am	+24:02:23

=== Cars ===
Pos	No.	Driver	Co-Driver	Car	Entrant	Time
1	302	(France) Stéphane Peterhansel	(France) Jean-Paul Cottret	Mini	Monster Energy X-Raid Team	38:54:46
2	305	(Spain) Nani Roma	(France) Michel Périn	Monster Energy X-Raid Team	+41:56	
3	301	(South Africa) Giniel de Villiers	(Germany) Dirk von Zitzewitz	Toyota	Imperial Toyota	+1:13:25
4	312	(Russia) Leonid Novitskiy	(Germany) Andreas Schulz	Monster Energy X-Raid Team	+2:11:54	
5	319	(Argentina) Lucio Alvarez	(Argentina) Bernardo Graue	Toyota	Overdrive Toyota	+4:05:52
6	307	(Portugal) Carlos Sousa	(France) Jean-Pierre Garcin	Great Wall	Team Great Wall	+4:30:24
7	309	(Portugal) Ricardo Leal dos Santos	(Portugal) Paulo Fiuza	Monster Energy X-Raid Team	+5:03:18	
8	314	(Netherlands) Bernhard ten Brinke	(France) Mathieu Baumel	Mitsubishi	Wevers Sport	+5:11:18
9	304	(Poland) Krzysztof Hołowczyc	(Belgium) Jean-Marc Fortin	Orlen X-Raid Team	+6:59:38	
10	313	(South Africa) Duncan Vos	(South Africa) Robert Howie	Toyota	Imperial Toyota	+7:08:31

=== Trucks ===
Pos	No.	Driver	Co-Drivers	Truck	Time
1	502	(Netherlands) Gérard de Rooy	(Belgium) Tom Colsoul (Poland) Dariusz Rodewald	Iveco	45:20:47
2	505	(Netherlands) Hans Stacey	(Netherlands) Hans van Goor (Netherlands) Bernard der Kinderen	Iveco	+51:19
3	533	(Kazakhstan) Artur Ardavichus	(Russia) Alexey Kuzmich (Kazakhstan) Nurlan Turlubaev	Kamaz	+1:47:45
4	509	(Russia) Andrey Karginov	(Russia) Andrey Mokeev (Russia) Igor Devyatkin	Kamaz	+5:01:10
5	523	(Russia) Ilgizar Mardeev	(Russia) Vyatcheslav Mizyukaev (Russia) Dmitry Sotnikov	Kamaz	+5:01:50
6	511	(Italy) Miki Biasion	(Netherlands) Michel Huisman (Italy) Giorgio Albiero	Iveco	+6:31:11
7	547	(Czech Republic) Martin Kolomý	(Czech Republic) René Kilian (Czech Republic) David Kilian	Tatra	+6:54:15
8	513	(Brazil) André de Azevedo	(Brazil) Maykel Justo (Czech Republic) Jaromír Martinec	Tatra	+7:46:07
9	508	(Japan) Teruhito Sugawara	(Japan) Seiichi Suzuki	Hino	+10:39:24
10	534	(Netherlands) Peter Versluis	(Belgium) Jurgen Damen (Netherlands) Harry Schuurmans	MAN	+11:12:32
