= Leonid Novitskiy =

Russian rally driver

Leonid Borisovich Novitskiy (born 1 July 1968, in Chelyabinsk) is a Russian cross-country rally driver. He won the FIA Cross Country Rally World Cup in both 2010 and 2011, driving for the X-Raid BMW team. He made his Dakar Rally debut in 2006, and finished eighth in 2009. He took his first Dakar stage victory on the opening stage of the 2012 Dakar Rally, driving a Mini All4 Racing for the X-Raid team to lead the event overall.

== Dakar Rally results ==
Year	Class	Vehicle	Position	Stages won
2006	Car	Nissan	25	0
2007	Car	Mitsubishi	20	0
2008	Event cancelled – replaced by the 2008 Central Europe Rally			
2009	Car	BMW	8	0
2010	Car	BMW	11	0
2011	Car	BMW	DNF	0
2012	Car	Mini	4	2
2013	Car	Mini	3rd	0
