= Alejandro Patronelli =

Argentine rally driver

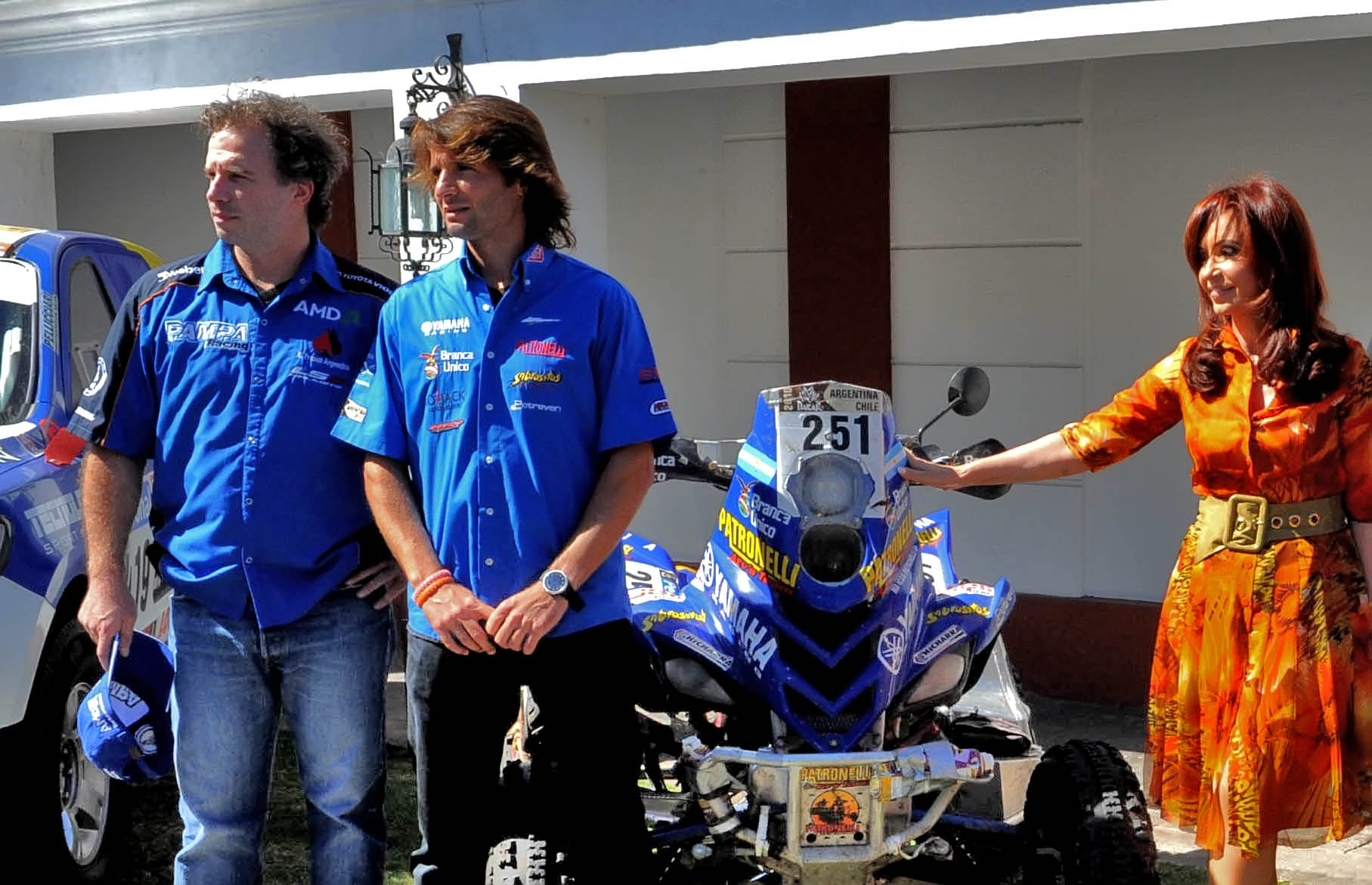
- Alejandro (left) with his brother Marcos at the 2010 Dakar Rally

Personal information
- Born: May 2, 1978 (age 48) Las Flores, Argentina

Sport
- Country: Argentina
- Sport: Motorsport
- Event: Rally raid
Medal record
Rally raid
Event	1st	2nd	3rd
Dakar Rally	2	2	0
Total	2	2	0

Alejandro Patronelli (born 22 May 1978) is an Argentine rally raid driver (quad), who is a two-time winner in the Dakar Rally (quads). He is the brother of the three-time winner Marcos Patronelli. He is also a three-time winner of the Enduro del Verano.

== Dakar Rally ==
Year	Category	Bike	Rank	Stages
2010	Quad	Yamaha Raptor 700	2nd	2
2011	Quad	Yamaha Raptor 700	1st	5
2012	Quad	Yamaha Raptor 700	1st	3
2013	Quad	forfait		
2016	Quad	Yamaha Raptor 700	2nd	1
