= Marcos Patronelli =

Argentine motorcycle racer

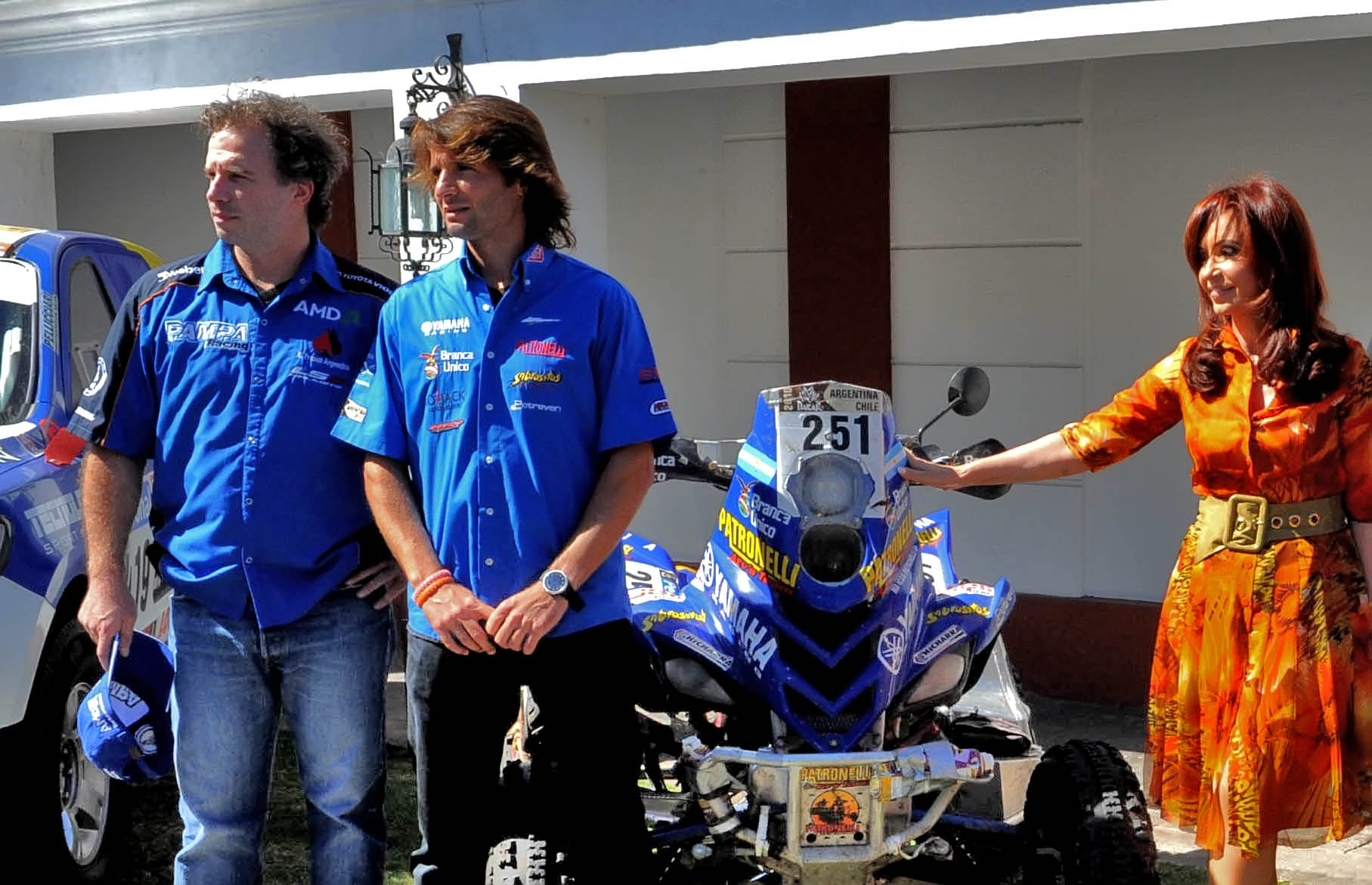
- Marcos (right) with his brother Alejandro at the 2010 Dakar Rally

Personal information
- Born: February 1, 1980 (age 46) Las Flores, Argentina
- Height: 1.80 m (5 ft 11 in)
- Weight: 80 kg (176 lb)

Sport
- Country: Argentina
- Sport: Motorsport
- Event: Rally raid
Medal record
Rally raid
Event	1st	2nd	3rd
Dakar Rally	3	2	0
Total	3	2	0

Marcos Patronelli (born 1 February 1980) is an Argentine rally raid driver (quad) who is a three-time winner the Dakar Rally (quads). He is the brother of the two-time winner Alejandro Patronelli. He is also a four-time winner of the Enduro del Verano.

== Dakar Rally ==
Year	Category	Bike	Rank	Stages
2009	Quad	Can-Am Renegade 800	2nd	3
2010	Quad	Yamaha Raptor 700	1st	4
2011	Quad	Yamaha Raptor 700	Ret.	0
2012	Quad	Yamaha Raptor 700	2nd	3
2013	Quad	Yamaha Raptor 700	1st	4
2014	Quad	Yamaha Raptor 700	Ret.	1
2016	Quad	Yamaha Raptor 700	1st	3
