= 2011 Dakar Rally =

Off-road motorsport event in Argentina and Chile

← Previous event	Next event →
- Route of the rally across Argentina and Chile.
- Host country: Argentina; Chile

Results
- Cars winner: (Qatar) Nasser Al-Attiyah (Germany) Timo Gottschalk; Volkswagen
- Bikes winner: (Spain) Marc Coma; KTM
- Quads winner: (Argentina) Alejandro Patronelli; Yamaha
- Trucks winner: (Russia) Vladimir Chagin (Russia) Sergey Savostin (Russia) Ildar Shaysultanov; Kamaz

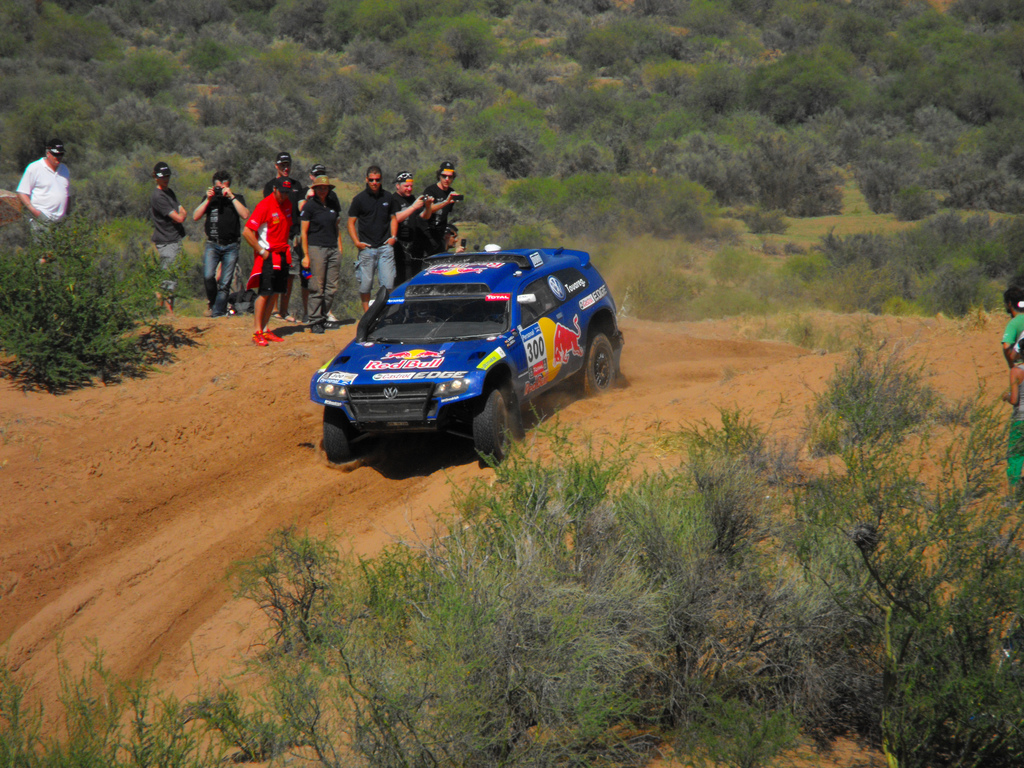
Defending car class winner Carlos Sainz's Volkswagen Race Touareg during the twelfth stage of the rally. Sainz was unable to repeat his victory of 2010, finishing third behind teammates Nasser Al-Attiyah and Giniel de Villiers.

The 2011 Dakar Rally was the 33rd running of the event. It was held in Argentina and Chile for the third successive time, and ran from 1 to 16 January. The Amaury Sport Organisation and the governments of Argentina and Chile agreed to a return to South America for the event on 23 March 2010.

The rally concluded in Buenos Aires, with Vladimir Chagin of Russia achieving a record seventh victory in the truck division, at the wheel of his Kamaz, thus becoming the most successful driver in a single category in the history of the event. Nasser Al-Attiyah of Qatar and Timo Gottschalk of Germany won in the car division, giving Volkswagen their fourth successive victory in the car class. Marc Coma from Spain won his third Dakar in the motorcycle category, and Alejandro Patronelli of Argentina repeated the feat of his brother—Marcos Patronelli in 2010—to win the class for quad-bikes.

== Entrants ==
The route of the 2011 Dakar Rally

407 Teams started the race with 200 motorcycles and all-terrain vehicles, 140 cars, and 67 trucks on the podium across from the Obelisk, on the 9th of July Avenue; one of Buenos Aires' major boulevards. 203 of the crews finished the event.

== The route ==
The race began on New Year's Day in downtown Buenos Aires. The total racing distance was 9,618 kilometres (5,976 mi) for cars, 9,605 kilometres (5,968 mi) for bikes and quads and 9,458 kilometres (5,877 mi) for trucks. Of these distances, 5,020 kilometres (3,120 mi) was timed special stage for cars, with 5,007 kilometres (3,111 mi) for bikes and quads and 4,457 kilometres (2,769 mi) for trucks. Of the thirteen stages, six were in Argentina, five in Chile with two stages cross-country.

=== Stages ===
Stage	Date	From	To	Class	Road Section		Special		Total		Stage Winners			
Stage	Date	From	To	Class	km	mi	km	mi	km	mi	Bikes	Quads	Cars	Trucks
1	1 January; 2 January	(Argentina) Buenos Aires (Argentina) Victoria	(Argentina) Victoria (Argentina) Córdoba	Bikes/Quads	943	586	192	119	1,135	705	(France) C. Despres	(Czech Republic) J. Macháček	(Spain) C. Sainz	(Russia) V. Chagin
1	1 January; 2 January	(Argentina) Buenos Aires (Argentina) Victoria	(Argentina) Victoria (Argentina) Córdoba	Cars/Trucks	943	586	222	138	1,165	724	(France) C. Despres	(Czech Republic) J. Macháček	(Spain) C. Sainz	(Russia) V. Chagin
2	3 January	(Argentina) Córdoba	(Argentina) Tucumán	Bikes/Quads	440	273	300	186	740	460	(France) C. Despres	(Argentina) A. Patronelli	(Spain) C. Sainz	(Russia) F. Kabirov
2	3 January	(Argentina) Córdoba	(Argentina) Tucumán	Cars/Trucks	440	273	324	201	764	475	(France) C. Despres	(Argentina) A. Patronelli	(Spain) C. Sainz	(Russia) F. Kabirov
3	4 January	(Argentina) San Miguel de Tucumán	(Argentina) Jujuy	Bikes/Quads	231	144	521	324	752	467	(Spain) M. Coma	(Argentina) T. Maffei	(Qatar) N. Al-Attiyah	(Russia) V. Chagin
3	4 January	(Argentina) San Miguel de Tucumán	(Argentina) Jujuy	Cars	231	144	500	311	731	454	(Spain) M. Coma	(Argentina) T. Maffei	(Qatar) N. Al-Attiyah	(Russia) V. Chagin
3	4 January	(Argentina) San Miguel de Tucumán	(Argentina) Jujuy	Trucks	408	254	226	140	634	394	(Spain) M. Coma	(Argentina) T. Maffei	(Qatar) N. Al-Attiyah	(Russia) V. Chagin
4	5 January	(Argentina) San Salvador de Jujuy	(Chile) Calama	All	554	344	207	129	761	473	(Spain) M. Coma	(Argentina) T. Maffei	(Spain) C. Sainz	(Russia) V. Chagin
5	6 January	(Chile) Calama	(Chile) Iquique	All	36	22	423	263	459	285	(Portugal) P. Gonçalves	(Argentina) A. Patronelli	(France) S. Peterhansel	(Russia) F. Kabirov
6	7 January	(Chile) Iquique	(Chile) Arica	All	265	165	456	283	721	448	(Portugal) H. Rodrigues	(Argentina) A. Patronelli	(Spain) C. Sainz	(Czech Republic) A. Loprais
–	8 January	(Chile) Arica		Rest day										
7	9 January	(Chile) Arica	(Chile) Antofagasta	Bikes/Quads	208	129	631	392	839	521	(Chile) F. López	(Argentina) S. Halpern	(Qatar) N. Al-Attiyah	(Czech Republic) A. Loprais
7	9 January	(Chile) Arica	(Chile) Antofagasta	Cars/Trucks	208	129	611	380	819	509	(Chile) F. López	(Argentina) S. Halpern	(Qatar) N. Al-Attiyah	(Czech Republic) A. Loprais
8	10 January	(Chile) Antofagasta	(Chile) Copiapó	All	268	167	508	316	776	482	(Spain) M. Coma	(Argentina) A. Patronelli	(Qatar) N. Al-Attiyah	(Russia) V. Chagin
9	11 January	(Chile) Copiapó	(Chile) Copiapó	All	35	22	235	146	270	168	(United States) J. Street	(Argentina) A. Patronelli	(Spain) C. Sainz	(Russia) F. Kabirov
10	12 January	(Chile) Copiapó	(Argentina) Chilecito	All	686	426	176	109	862	536	(Spain) M. Coma	(Argentina) J. Santamarina	(South Africa) G. de Villiers	(Russia) V. Chagin
11	13 January	(Argentina) Chilecito	(Argentina) San Juan	All	164	102	622	386	786	488	(France) C. Despres	(Argentina) S. Halpern	(Qatar) N. Al-Attiyah	(Russia) V. Chagin
12	14 January	(Argentina) San Juan	(Argentina) Córdoba	Bikes/Quads	123	76	555	345	678	421	(Spain) M. Coma	(France) C. Declerck	(Spain) C. Sainz	(Russia) V. Chagin
12	14 January	(Argentina) San Juan	(Argentina) Córdoba	Cars	123	76	555	345	678	421	(Spain) M. Coma	(France) C. Declerck	(Spain) C. Sainz	(Russia) V. Chagin
12	14 January	(Argentina) San Juan	(Argentina) Córdoba	Trucks	349	217	266	165	615	382	(Spain) M. Coma	(France) C. Declerck	(Spain) C. Sainz	(Russia) V. Chagin
13	15 January	(Argentina) Córdoba	(Argentina) Buenos Aires	All	645	401	181	112	826	513	(Netherlands) F. Verhoeven	(Poland) Ł. Łaskawiec	(Spain) C. Sainz	(Russia) F. Kabirov
–	16 January	Finish in Buenos Aires												
TOTALS					km	mi	km	mi	km	mi				
Bikes & Quads					4,598	2,857	5,007	3,111	9,605	5,968				
Cars					4,598	2,857	5,020	3,119	9,618	5,976				
Trucks					5,001	3,107	4,457	2,769	9,458	5,877				

== Stage results ==
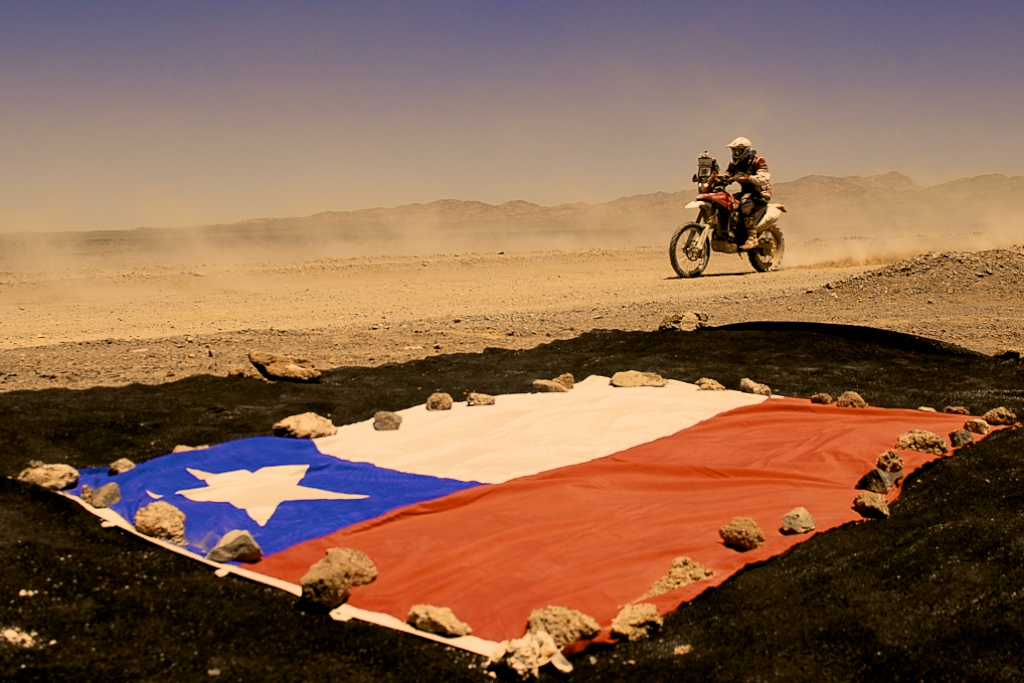
A motorcyclist rides in the desert beside the Flag of Chile

=== Motorcycles ===
KTM's Cyril Despres won the first two stages of the rally, to take an early lead of over two minutes on fellow KTM rider Marc Coma. Coma closed the gap to just fourteen seconds after his win on the third stage, and took the overall lead on stage four with his second stage win as Despres lost over ten minutes on the stage, dropping him to second in the standings. Coma maintained his lead overall until the end of the race, taking further stage wins in stages eight, ten and twelve en route to his third victory in the event. Despres, a three-time winner himself, won stage eleven but ended the rally fifteen minutes behind Coma in second place. Aprilia's Francisco López moved into third position after the fourth stage, and having won the seventh stage, had been set to complete the podium behind Coma and Despres. However, on the final stage, López suffered a mechanical failure 22 kilometres (14 mi) from the finish line and lost over an hour to his rivals. His misfortune allowed Hélder Rodrigues, riding a Yamaha to take third place. López took fourth position, almost half an hour behind Rodrigues.

	Stage result					General classification				
Stage	Pos	Competitor	Make	Time	Difference	Pos	Competitor	Make	Time	Difference
1	1	C. Despres (FRA)	KTM	1h 58' 31"	+ 00' 00"	1	C. Despres (FRA)	KTM	1h 58' 31"	+ 00' 00"
1	2	R. Faria (POR)	KTM	1h 59' 02"	+ 00' 31"	2	R. Faria (POR)	KTM	1h 59' 02"	+ 00' 31"
1	3	M. Coma (ESP)	KTM	1h 59' 17"	+ 00' 46"	3	M. Coma (ESP)	KTM	1h 59' 17"	+ 00' 46"
2	1	C. Despres (FRA)	KTM	3h 19' 11"	+ 00' 00"	1	C. Despres (FRA)	KTM	5h 17' 42"	+ 00' 00"
2	2	M. Coma (ESP)	KTM	3h 21' 00"	+ 01' 49"	2	M. Coma (ESP)	KTM	5h 20' 17"	+ 02' 35"
2	3	F. López (CHI)	Aprilia	3h 23' 17"	+ 04' 06"	3	R. Faria (POR)	KTM	5h 23' 55"	+ 06' 13"
3	1	M. Coma (ESP)	KTM	4h 18' 55"	+ 00' 00"	1	C. Despres (FRA)	KTM	9h 38' 58"	+ 00' 00"
3	2	C. Despres (FRA)	KTM	4h 21' 16"	+ 02' 21"	2	M. Coma (ESP)	KTM	9h 39' 12"	+ 00' 14"
3	3	P. Gonçalves (POR)	BMW	4h 22' 31"	+ 03' 36"	3	R. Faria (POR)	KTM	9h 48' 36"	+ 09' 38"
4	1	M. Coma (ESP)	KTM	2h 04' 00"	+ 00' 00"	1	M. Coma (ESP)	KTM	11h 43' 12"	+ 00' 00"
4	2	F. López (CHI)	Aprilia	2h 06' 05"	+ 02' 05"	2	C. Despres (FRA)	KTM	11h 53' 14"	+ 10' 02"
4	3	O. Pain (FRA)	Yamaha	2h 10' 20"	+ 06' 20"	3	F. López (CHI)	Aprilia	12h 03' 24"	+ 20' 12"
5	1	P. Gonçalves (POR)	BMW	5h 12' 23"	+ 00' 00"	1	M. Coma (ESP)	KTM	16h 59' 33"	+ 00' 00"
5	2	F. López (CHI)	Aprilia	5h 14' 41"	+ 02' 18"	2	C. Despres (FRA)	KTM	17h 09' 47"	+ 10' 14"
5	3	F. Verhoeven (NLD)	BMW	5h 14' 42"	+ 02' 19"	3	F. López (CHI)	Aprilia	17h 18' 05"	+ 18' 32"
6	1	H. Rodrigues (POR)	Yamaha	5h 36' 17"	+ 00' 00"	1	M. Coma (ESP)	KTM	22h 40' 20"	+ 00' 00"
6	2	C. Despres (FRA)	KTM	5h 39' 21"	+ 03' 04"	2	C. Despres (FRA)	KTM	22h 49' 08"	+ 08' 48"
6	3	M. Coma (ESP)	KTM	5h 40' 47"	+ 04' 30"	3	F. López (CHI)	Aprilia	23h 02' 32"	+ 22' 12"
7	1	F. López (CHI)	Aprilia	3h 29' 45"	+ 00' 00"	1	M. Coma (ESP)	KTM	26h 13' 50"	+ 00' 00"
7	2	C. Despres (FRA)	KTM	3h 32' 06"	+ 02' 21"	2	C. Despres (FRA)	KTM	26h 21' 14"	+ 07' 24"
7	3	M. Coma (ESP)	KTM	3h 33' 30"	+ 03' 45"	3	F. López (CHI)	Aprilia	26h 32' 17"	+ 18' 27"
8	1	M. Coma (ESP)	KTM	6h 05' 02"	+ 00' 00"	1	M. Coma (ESP)	KTM	32h 18' 52"	+ 00' 00"
8	2	C. Despres (FRA)	KTM	6h 06' 57"	+ 01' 55"	2	C. Despres (FRA)	KTM	32h 28' 11"	+ 09' 19"
8	3	F. López (CHI)	Aprilia	6h 09' 23"	+ 04' 21"	3	F. López (CHI)	Aprilia	32h 41' 40"	+ 22' 48"
9	1	J. Street (USA)	Yamaha	3h 06' 56"	+ 00' 00"	1	M. Coma (ESP)	KTM	35h 32' 56"	+ 00' 00"
9	2	F. Verhoeven (NLD)	BMW	3h 10' 34"	+ 03' 38"	2	C. Despres (FRA)	KTM	35h 41' 10"	+ 08' 14"
9	3	D. Casteu (FRA)	Sherco	3h 10' 36"	+ 03' 40"	3	F. López (CHI)	Aprilia	35h 56' 29"	+ 23' 33"
10	1	M. Coma (ESP)	KTM	3h 06' 35"	+ 00' 00"	1	M. Coma (ESP)	KTM	38h 39' 31"	+ 00' 00"
10	2	C. Despres (FRA)	KTM	3h 16' 31"	+ 09' 56"	2	C. Despres (FRA)	KTM	38h 57' 41"	+ 18' 10"
10	3	R. Faria (POR)	KTM	3h 19' 57"	+ 13' 22"	3	F. López (CHI)	Aprilia	39h 24' 47"	+ 45' 16"
11	1	C. Despres (FRA)	KTM	4h 33' 13"	+ 00' 00"	1	M. Coma (ESP)	KTM	43h 14' 55"	+ 00' 00"
11	2	M. Coma (ESP)	KTM	4h 35' 24"	+ 02' 11"	2	C. Despres (FRA)	KTM	43h 30' 54"	+ 15' 59"
11	3	F. López (CHI)	Aprilia	4h 39' 32"	+ 06' 19"	3	F. López (CHI)	Aprilia	44h 04' 19"	+ 49' 24"
12	1	M. Coma (ESP)	KTM	6h 42' 42"	+ 00' 00"	1	M. Coma (ESP)	KTM	49h 57' 37"	+ 00' 00"
12	2	C. Despres (FRA)	KTM	6h 43' 19"	+ 00' 37"	2	C. Despres (FRA)	KTM	50h 14' 13"	+ 16' 36"
12	3	H. Rodrigues (POR)	Yamaha	6h 50' 03"	+ 07' 21"	3	F. López (CHI)	Aprilia	50h 57' 04"	+ 59' 27"
13	1	F. Verhoeven (NLD)	BMW	1h 25' 07"	+ 00' 00"	1	M. Coma (ESP)	KTM	51h 25' 00"	+ 00' 00"
13	2	H. Rodrigues (POR)	Yamaha	1h 25' 12"	+ 00' 05"	2	C. Despres (FRA)	KTM	51h 40' 04"	+ 15' 04"
13	3	J. de Azevedo (BRA)	KTM	1h 25' 26"	+ 00' 19"	3	H. Rodrigues (POR)	Yamaha	53h 05' 20"	+ 1h 40' 20"

=== Quads ===
	Stage result					General classification				
Stage	Pos	Competitor	Make	Time	Difference	Pos	Competitor	Make	Time	Difference
1	1	J. Macháček (CZE)	Yamaha	2h 14' 07"	+ 00' 00"	1	J. Macháček (CZE)	Yamaha	2h 14' 07"	+ 00' 00"
1	2	M. Plechatý (CZE)	Yamaha	2h 15' 13"	+ 01' 06"	2	M. Plechatý (CZE)	Yamaha	2h 15' 13"	+ 01' 06"
1	3	S. Halpern (ARG)	Yamaha	2h 17' 11"	+ 03' 04"	3	S. Halpern (ARG)	Yamaha	2h 17' 11"	+ 03' 04"
2	1	A. Patronelli (ARG)	Yamaha	3h 40' 35"	+ 00' 00"	1	A. Patronelli (ARG)	Yamaha	6h 00' 06"	+ 00' 00"
2	2	T. Maffei (ARG)	Yamaha	3h 44' 56"	+ 04' 21"	2	S. Halpern (ARG)	Yamaha	6h 02' 50"	+ 02' 44"
2	3	S. Halpern (ARG)	Yamaha	3h 45' 39"	+ 05' 04"	3	M. Plechatý (CZE)	Yamaha	6h 02' 51"	+ 02' 45"
3	1	T. Maffei (ARG)	Yamaha	4h 58' 04"	+ 00' 00"	1	S. Halpern (ARG)	Yamaha	11h 02' 21"	+ 00' 00"
3	2	S. Halpern (ARG)	Yamaha	4h 59' 31"	+ 01' 27"	2	A. Patronelli (ARG)	Yamaha	11h 02' 33"	+ 00' 12"
3	3	A. Patronelli (ARG)	Yamaha	5h 02' 27"	+ 04' 23"	3	T. Maffei (ARG)	Yamaha	11h 03' 33"	+ 01' 12"
4	1	T. Maffei (ARG)	Yamaha	2h 30' 23"	+ 00' 00"	1	T. Maffei (ARG)	Yamaha	13h 33' 56"	+ 00' 00"
4	2	A. Patronelli (ARG)	Yamaha	2h 33' 17"	+ 02' 54"	2	A. Patronelli (ARG)	Yamaha	13h 35' 50"	+ 01' 54"
4	3	S. Halpern (ARG)	Yamaha	2h 34' 46"	+ 04' 23"	3	S. Halpern (ARG)	Yamaha	13h 37' 07"	+ 03' 11"
5	1	A. Patronelli (ARG)	Yamaha	6h 04' 34"	+ 00' 00"	1	A. Patronelli (ARG)	Yamaha	19h 40' 24"	+ 00' 00"
5	2	T. Maffei (ARG)	Yamaha	6h 07' 55"	+ 03' 21"	2	T. Maffei (ARG)	Yamaha	19h 41' 51"	+ 01' 27"
5	3	M. Plechatý (CZE)	Yamaha	6h 40' 36"	+ 36' 02"	3	S. Halpern (ARG)	Yamaha	20h 23' 19"	+ 42' 55"
6	1	A. Patronelli (ARG)	Yamaha	6h 57' 33"	+ 00' 00"	1	A. Patronelli (ARG)	Yamaha	26h 37' 57"	+ 00' 00"
6	2	T. Maffei (ARG)	Yamaha	7h 02' 37"	+ 05' 04"	2	T. Maffei (ARG)	Yamaha	26h 44' 28"	+ 06' 31"
6	3	J. Macháček (CZE)	Yamaha	7h 29' 34"	+ 32' 01"	3	S. Halpern (ARG)	Yamaha	28h 10' 04"	+ 1h 32' 07"
7	1	S. Halpern (ARG)	Yamaha	4h 01' 26"	+ 00' 00"	1	T. Maffei (ARG)	Yamaha	31h 44' 45"	+ 00' 00"
7	2	Ł. Łaskawiec (POL)	Yamaha	4h 03' 36"	+ 02' 10"	2	A. Patronelli (ARG)	Yamaha	31h 47' 48"	+ 03' 03"
7	3	J. Santamarina (ARG)	Honda	4h 07' 42"	+ 06' 16"	3	S. Halpern (ARG)	Yamaha	32h 11' 30"	+ 26' 45"
8	1	A. Patronelli (ARG)	Yamaha	7h 57' 26"	+ 00' 00"	1	A. Patronelli (ARG)	Yamaha	39h 45' 14"	+ 00' 00"
8	2	J. Macháček (CZE)	Yamaha	8h 05' 28"	+ 08' 02"	2	S. Halpern (ARG)	Yamaha	40h 43' 46"	+ 58' 32"
8	3	Ł. Łaskawiec (POL)	Yamaha	8h 08' 26"	+ 11' 00"	3	J. Macháček (CZE)	Yamaha	42h 27' 02"	+ 2h 41' 48"
9	1	A. Patronelli (ARG)	Yamaha	3h 43' 27"	+ 00' 00"	1	A. Patronelli (ARG)	Yamaha	43h 28' 41"	+ 00' 00"
9	2	J. Macháček (CZE)	Yamaha	3h 48' 48"	+ 05' 21"	2	S. Halpern (ARG)	Yamaha	44h 45' 04"	+ 1h 16' 23"
9	3	Ł. Łaskawiec (POL)	Yamaha	3h 53' 42"	+ 10' 15"	3	J. Macháček (CZE)	Yamaha	46h 15' 50"	+ 2h 47' 09"
10	1	J. Santamarina (ARG)	Honda	4h 14' 49"	+ 00' 00"	1	A. Patronelli (ARG)	Yamaha	47h 48' 53"	+ 00' 00"
10	2	S. Halpern (ARG)	Yamaha	4h 14' 57"	+ 00' 08"	2	S. Halpern (ARG)	Yamaha	49h 00' 01"	+ 1h 11' 08"
10	3	Ł. Łaskawiec (POL)	Yamaha	4h 17' 52"	+ 03' 03"	3	J. Macháček (CZE)	Yamaha	50h 34' 49"	+ 2h 45' 56"
11	1	S. Halpern (ARG)	Yamaha	5h 35' 30"	+ 00' 00"	1	A. Patronelli (ARG)	Yamaha	53h 28' 59"	+ 00' 00"
11	2	T. Maffei (ARG)	Yamaha	5h 39' 22"	+ 03' 52"	2	S. Halpern (ARG)	Yamaha	54h 35' 31"	+ 1h 06' 32"
11	3	A. Patronelli (ARG)	Yamaha	5h 40' 06"	+ 04' 36"	3	C. Declerck (FRA)	Polaris	59h 58' 59"	+ 6h 30' 00"
12	1	C. Declerck (FRA)	Polaris	8h 30' 07"	+ 00' 00"	1	A. Patronelli (ARG)	Yamaha	62h 07' 34"	+ 00' 00"
12	2	S. Halpern (ARG)	Yamaha	8h 30' 21"	+ 00' 14"	2	S. Halpern (ARG)	Yamaha	63h 05' 52"	+ 58' 18"
12	3	Ł. Łaskawiec (POL)	Yamaha	8h 32' 39"	+ 02' 32"	3	C. Declerck (FRA)	Polaris	68h 29' 06"	+ 6h 21' 32"
13	1	Ł. Łaskawiec (POL)	Yamaha	1h 35' 00"	+ 00' 00"	1	A. Patronelli (ARG)	Yamaha	63h 49' 47"	+ 00' 00"
13	2	C. Declerck (FRA)	Polaris	1h 39' 11"	+ 04' 11"	2	S. Halpern (ARG)	Yamaha	64h 49' 40"	+ 59' 53"
13	3	A. Patronelli (ARG)	Yamaha	1h 42' 13"	+ 07' 13"	3	Ł. Łaskawiec (POL)	Yamaha	70h 07' 25"	+ 6h 17' 38"

=== Cars ===
	Stage result					General classification				
Stage	Pos	Competitor	Make	Time	Difference	Pos	Competitor	Make	Time	Difference
1	1	C. Sainz (ESP); L. Cruz (ESP)	Volkswagen	2h 18' 32"	+ 00' 00"	1	C. Sainz (ESP); L. Cruz (ESP)	Volkswagen	2h 18' 32"	+ 00' 00"
1	2	S. Peterhansel (FRA); J-P. Cottret (FRA)	BMW	2h 20' 03"	+ 01' 31"	2	S. Peterhansel (FRA); J-P. Cottret (FRA)	BMW	2h 20' 03"	+ 01' 31"
1	3	N. Al-Attiyah (QAT); T. Gottschalk (GER)	Volkswagen	2h 20' 48"	+ 02' 16"	3	N. Al-Attiyah (QAT); T. Gottschalk (GER)	Volkswagen	2h 20' 48"	+ 02' 16"
2	1	C. Sainz (ESP); L. Cruz (ESP)	Volkswagen	3h 10' 48"	+ 00' 00"	1	C. Sainz (ESP); L. Cruz (ESP)	Volkswagen	5h 29' 20"	+ 00' 00"
2	2	N. Al-Attiyah (QAT); T. Gottschalk (GER)	Volkswagen	3h 12' 31"	+ 01' 43"	2	S. Peterhansel (FRA); J-P. Cottret (FRA)	BMW	5h 33' 05"	+ 03' 45"
2	3	S. Peterhansel (FRA); J-P. Cottret (FRA)	BMW	3h 13' 02"	+ 02' 14"	3	N. Al-Attiyah (QAT); T. Gottschalk (GER)	Volkswagen	5h 33' 19"	+ 03' 59"
3	1	N. Al-Attiyah (QAT); T. Gottschalk (GER)	Volkswagen	3h 42' 20"	+ 00' 00"	1	C. Sainz (ESP); L. Cruz (ESP)	Volkswagen	9h 12' 05"	+ 00' 00"
3	2	C. Sainz (ESP); L. Cruz (ESP)	Volkswagen	3h 42' 45"	+ 00' 25"	2	N. Al-Attiyah (QAT); T. Gottschalk (GER)	Volkswagen	9h 15' 39"	+ 03' 34"
3	3	S. Peterhansel (FRA); J-P. Cottret (FRA)	BMW	3h 43' 19"	+ 00' 59"	3	S. Peterhansel (FRA); J-P. Cottret (FRA)	BMW	9h 16' 24"	+ 04' 19"
4	1	C. Sainz (ESP); L. Cruz (ESP)	Volkswagen	1h 57' 09"	+ 00' 00"	1	C. Sainz (ESP); L. Cruz (ESP)	Volkswagen	11h 09' 14"	+ 00' 00"
4	2	N. Al-Attiyah (QAT); T. Gottschalk (GER)	Volkswagen	1h 57' 59"	+ 00' 50"	2	N. Al-Attiyah (QAT); T. Gottschalk (GER)	Volkswagen	11h 13' 38"	+ 04' 24"
4	3	S. Peterhansel (FRA); J-P. Cottret (FRA)	BMW	1h 58' 31"	+ 01' 22"	3	S. Peterhansel (FRA); J-P. Cottret (FRA)	BMW	11h 14' 55"	+ 05' 41"
5	1	S. Peterhansel (FRA); J-P. Cottret (FRA)	BMW	4h 33' 19"	+ 00' 00"	1	C. Sainz (ESP); L. Cruz (ESP)	Volkswagen	15h 45' 48"	+ 00' 00"
5	2	N. Al-Attiyah (QAT); T. Gottschalk (GER)	Volkswagen	4h 34' 43"	+ 01' 24"	2	S. Peterhansel (FRA); J-P. Cottret (FRA)	BMW	15h 48' 14"	+ 02' 26"
5	3	C. Sainz (ESP); L. Cruz (ESP)	Volkswagen	4h 36' 34"	+ 03' 15"	3	N. Al-Attiyah (QAT); T. Gottschalk (GER)	Volkswagen	15h 48' 21"	+ 02' 33"
6	1	C. Sainz (ESP); L. Cruz (ESP)	Volkswagen	4h 53' 53"	+ 00' 00"	1	C. Sainz (ESP); L. Cruz (ESP)	Volkswagen	20h 39' 41"	+ 00' 00"
6	2	N. Al-Attiyah (QAT); T. Gottschalk (GER)	Volkswagen	4h 54' 02"	+ 00' 09"	2	N. Al-Attiyah (QAT); T. Gottschalk (GER)	Volkswagen	20h 42' 23"	+ 02' 42"
6	3	G. de Villiers (RSA); D. von Zitzewitz (GER)	Volkswagen	5h 03' 42"	+ 09' 49"	3	S. Peterhansel (FRA); J-P. Cottret (FRA)	BMW	20h 54' 32"	+ 14' 51"
7	1	N. Al-Attiyah (QAT); T. Gottschalk (GER)	Volkswagen	2h 40' 57"	+ 00' 00"	1	C. Sainz (ESP); L. Cruz (ESP)	Volkswagen	23h 21' 58"	+ 00' 00"
7	2	C. Sainz (ESP); L. Cruz (ESP)	Volkswagen	2h 42' 17"	+ 01' 20"	2	N. Al-Attiyah (QAT); T. Gottschalk (GER)	Volkswagen	23h 23' 20"	+ 01' 22"
7	3	G. de Villiers (RSA); D. von Zitzewitz (GER)	Volkswagen	2h 43' 53"	+ 02' 56"	3	S. Peterhansel (FRA); J-P. Cottret (FRA)	BMW	23h 43' 09"	+ 21' 11"
8	1	N. Al-Attiyah (QAT); T. Gottschalk (GER)	Volkswagen	5h 16' 30"	+ 00' 00"	1	N. Al-Attiyah (QAT); T. Gottschalk (GER)	Volkswagen	28h 39' 50"	+ 00' 00"
8	2	C. Sainz (ESP); L. Cruz (ESP)	Volkswagen	5h 23' 06"	+ 06' 36"	2	C. Sainz (ESP); L. Cruz (ESP)	Volkswagen	28h 45' 04"	+ 05' 14"
8	3	G. de Villiers (RSA); D. von Zitzewitz (GER)	Volkswagen	5h 33' 52"	+ 17' 22"	3	G. de Villiers (RSA); D. von Zitzewitz (GER)	Volkswagen	29h 28' 35"	+ 48' 45"
9	1	C. Sainz (ESP); L. Cruz (ESP)	Volkswagen	2h 14' 39"	+ 00' 00"	1	N. Al-Attiyah (QAT); T. Gottschalk (GER)	Volkswagen	30h 56' 25"	+ 00' 00"
9	2	N. Al-Attiyah (QAT); T. Gottschalk (GER)	Volkswagen	2h 16' 35"	+ 01' 56"	2	C. Sainz (ESP); L. Cruz (ESP)	Volkswagen	30h 59' 43"	+ 03' 18"
9	3	G. de Villiers (RSA); D. von Zitzewitz (GER)	Volkswagen	2h 23' 41"	+ 09' 02"	3	G. de Villiers (RSA); D. von Zitzewitz (GER)	Volkswagen	31h 52' 16"	+ 55' 51"
10	1	G. de Villiers (RSA); D. von Zitzewitz (GER)	Volkswagen	2h 53' 15"	+ 00' 00"	1	N. Al-Attiyah (QAT); T. Gottschalk (GER)	Volkswagen	33h 58' 34"	+ 00' 00"
10	2	K. Hołowczyc (POL); J-M. Fortin (BEL)	BMW	2h 57' 38"	+ 04' 23"	2	C. Sainz (ESP); L. Cruz (ESP)	Volkswagen	34h 11' 11"	+ 12' 37"
10	3	S. Peterhansel (FRA); J-P. Cottret (FRA)	BMW	2h 58' 53"	+ 05' 38"	3	G. de Villiers (RSA); D. von Zitzewitz (GER)	Volkswagen	34h 45' 31"	+ 46' 57"
11	1	N. Al-Attiyah (QAT); T. Gottschalk (GER)	Volkswagen	4h 17' 27"	+ 00' 00"	1	N. Al-Attiyah (QAT); T. Gottschalk (GER)	Volkswagen	38h 16' 01"	+ 00' 00"
11	2	S. Peterhansel (FRA); J-P. Cottret (FRA)	BMW	4h 18' 40"	+ 01' 13"	2	G. de Villiers (RSA); D. von Zitzewitz (GER)	Volkswagen	39h 07' 50"	+ 51' 49"
11	3	G. de Villiers (RSA); D. Von Zitzewitz (GER)	Volkswagen	4h 22' 19"	+ 04' 52"	3	C. Sainz (ESP); L. Cruz (ESP)	Volkswagen	39h 43' 28"	+ 1h 27' 27"
12	1	C. Sainz (ESP); L. Cruz (ESP)	Volkswagen	5h 37' 18"	+ 00' 00"	1	N. Al-Attiyah (QAT); T. Gottschalk (GER)	Volkswagen	43h 59' 30"	+ 00' 00"
12	2	G. de Villiers (RSA); D. von Zitzewitz (GER)	Volkswagen	5h 40' 01"	+ 02' 43"	2	G. de Villiers (RSA); D. von Zitzewitz (GER)	Volkswagen	44h 47' 51"	+ 48' 21"
12	3	N. Al-Attiyah (QAT); T. Gottschalk (GER)	Volkswagen	5h 43' 29"	+ 06' 11"	3	C. Sainz (ESP); L. Cruz (ESP)	Volkswagen	45h 20' 46"	+ 1h 21' 16"
13	1	C. Sainz (ESP); L. Cruz (ESP)	Volkswagen	1h 16' 08"	+ 00' 00"	1	N. Al-Attiyah (QAT); T. Gottschalk (GER)	Volkswagen	45h 16' 16"	+ 00' 00"
13	2	N. Al-Attiyah (QAT); T. Gottschalk (GER)	Volkswagen	1h 16' 46"	+ 00' 38"	2	G. de Villiers (RSA); D. von Zitzewitz (GER)	Volkswagen	46h 05' 57"	+ 49' 41"
13	3	K. Hołowczyc (POL); J-M. Fortin (BEL)	BMW	1h 17' 33"	+ 01' 25"	3	C. Sainz (ESP); L. Cruz (ESP)	Volkswagen	46h 36' 54"	+ 1h 20' 38"

=== Trucks ===
	Stage result					General classification				
Stage	Pos	Competitor	Make	Time	Difference	Pos	Competitor	Make	Time	Difference
1	1	V. Chagin (RUS); S. Savostin (RUS); I. Shaysultanov (RUS)	Kamaz	2h 44' 22"	+ 00' 00"	1	V. Chagin (RUS); S. Savostin (RUS); I. Shaysultanov (RUS)	Kamaz	2h 44' 22"	+ 00' 00"
1	2	A. Loprais (CZE); M. Holáň (CZE); J. Kalina (CZE)	Tatra	2h 49' 03"	+ 04' 41"	2	A. Loprais (CZE); M. Holáň (CZE); J. Kalina (CZE)	Tatra	2h 49' 03"	+ 04' 41"
1	3	F. Kabirov (RUS); A. Belyaev (RUS); A. Mokeev (RUS)	Kamaz	2h 50' 14"	+ 05' 52"	3	F. Kabirov (RUS); A. Belyaev (RUS); A. Mokeev (RUS)	Kamaz	2h 50' 14"	+ 05' 52"
2	1	F. Kabirov (RUS); A. Belyaev (RUS); A. Mokeev (RUS)	Kamaz	3h 50' 46"	+ 00' 00"	1	F. Kabirov (RUS); A. Belyaev (RUS); A. Mokeev (RUS)	Kamaz	6h 41' 00"	+ 00' 00"
2	2	A. Loprais (CZE); M. Holáň (CZE); J. Kalina (CZE)	Tatra	3h 52' 06"	+ 01' 20"	2	A. Loprais (CZE); M. Holáň (CZE); J. Kalina (CZE)	Tatra	6h 41' 09"	+ 00' 09"
2	3	F. Echter (GER); D. Ruf (GER); A. Klein (GER)	MAN	3h 55' 55"	+ 05' 09"	3	V. Chagin (RUS); S. Savostin (RUS); I. Shaysultanov (RUS)	Kamaz	6h 41' 22"	+ 00' 22"
3	1	V. Chagin (RUS); S. Savostin (RUS); I. Shaysultanov (RUS)	Kamaz	2h 57' 36"	+ 00' 00"	1	V. Chagin (RUS); S. Savostin (RUS); I. Shaysultanov (RUS)	Kamaz	9h 38' 58"	+ 00' 00"
3	2	F. Kabirov (RUS); A. Belyaev (RUS); A. Mokeev (RUS)	Kamaz	3h 04' 21"	+ 06' 45"	2	F. Kabirov (RUS); A. Belyaev (RUS); A. Mokeev (RUS)	Kamaz	9h 45' 21"	+ 06' 23"
3	3	A. Loprais (CZE); M. Holáň (CZE); J. Kalina (CZE)	Tatra	3h 04' 26"	+ 06' 50"	3	A. Loprais (CZE); M. Holáň (CZE); J. Kalina (CZE)	Tatra	9h 45' 35"	+ 06' 37"
4	1	V. Chagin (RUS); S. Savostin (RUS); I. Shaysultanov (RUS)	Kamaz	2h 10' 18"	+ 00' 00"	1	V. Chagin (RUS); S. Savostin (RUS); I. Shaysultanov (RUS)	Kamaz	11h 49' 16"	+ 00' 00"
4	2	F. Kabirov (RUS); A. Belyaev (RUS); A. Mokeev (RUS)	Kamaz	2h 12' 36"	+ 02' 18"	2	F. Kabirov (RUS); A. Belyaev (RUS); A. Mokeev (RUS)	Kamaz	11h 57' 57"	+ 08' 41"
4	3	A. Loprais (CZE); M. Holáň (CZE); J. Kalina (CZE)	Tatra	2h 16' 17"	+ 05' 59"	3	A. Loprais (CZE); M. Holáň (CZE); J. Kalina (CZE)	Tatra	12h 01' 52"	+ 12' 36"
5	1	F. Kabirov (RUS); A. Belyaev (RUS); A. Mokeev (RUS)	Kamaz	5h 41' 11"	+ 00' 00"	1	F. Kabirov (RUS); A. Belyaev (RUS); A. Mokeev (RUS)	Kamaz	17h 39' 08"	+ 00' 00"
5	2	E. Nikolaev (RUS); V. Mizyukaev (RUS); V. Rybakov (RUS)	Kamaz	6h 01' 16"	+ 20' 05"	2	V. Chagin (RUS); S. Savostin (RUS); I. Shaysultanov (RUS)	Kamaz	17h 52' 44"	+ 13' 36"
5	3	A. Loprais (CZE); M. Holáň (CZE); J. Kalina (CZE)	Tatra	6h 02' 36"	+ 21' 25"	3	A. Loprais (CZE); M. Holáň (CZE); J. Kalina (CZE)	Tatra	18h 04' 28"	+ 25' 20"
6	1	A. Loprais (CZE); M. Holáň (CZE); J. Kalina (CZE)	Tatra	6h 00' 37"	+ 00' 00"	1	F. Kabirov (RUS); A. Belyaev (RUS); A. Mokeev (RUS)	Kamaz	23h 43' 40"	+ 00' 00"
6	2	F. Kabirov (RUS); A. Belyaev (RUS); A. Mokeev (RUS)	Kamaz	6h 04' 32"	+ 03' 55"	2	V. Chagin (RUS); S. Savostin (RUS); I. Shaysultanov (RUS)	Kamaz	24h 03' 00"	+ 19' 20"
6	3	V. Chagin (RUS); S. Savostin (RUS); I. Shaysultanov (RUS)	Kamaz	6h 10' 16"	+ 09' 39"	3	A. Loprais (CZE); M. Holáň (CZE); J. Kalina (CZE)	Tatra	24h 05' 05"	+ 21' 25"
7	1	A. Loprais (CZE); M. Holáň (CZE); J. Kalina (CZE)	Tatra	2h 23' 43"	+ 00' 00"	1	F. Kabirov (RUS); A. Belyaev (RUS); A. Mokeev (RUS)	Kamaz	26h 12' 26"	+ 00' 00"
7	2	F. Kabirov (RUS); A. Belyaev (RUS); A. Mokeev (RUS)	Kamaz	2h 28' 46"	+ 05' 03"	2	A. Loprais (CZE); M. Holáň (CZE); J. Kalina (CZE)	Tatra	26h 28' 48"	+ 16' 22"
7	3	V. Chagin (RUS); S. Savostin (RUS); I. Shaysultanov (RUS)	Kamaz	2h 37' 48"	+ 14' 05"	3	V. Chagin (RUS); S. Savostin (RUS); I. Shaysultanov (RUS)	Kamaz	26h 40' 48"	+ 28' 22"
8	1	V. Chagin (RUS); S. Savostin (RUS); I. Shaysultanov (RUS)	Kamaz	6h 01' 12"	+ 00' 00"	1	V. Chagin (RUS); S. Savostin (RUS); I. Shaysultanov (RUS)	Kamaz	32h 42' 00"	+ 00' 00"
8	2	F. Kabirov (RUS); A. Belyaev (RUS); A. Mokeev (RUS)	Kamaz	6h 33' 01"	+ 31' 49"	2	F. Kabirov (RUS); A. Belyaev (RUS); A. Mokeev (RUS)	Kamaz	32h 45' 27"	+ 03' 27"
8	3	E. Nikolaev (RUS); V. Mizyukaev (RUS); V. Rybakov (RUS)	Kamaz	6h 38' 07"	+ 36' 55"	3	A. Loprais (CZE); M. Holáň (CZE); J. Kalina (CZE)	Tatra	33h 11' 36"	+ 29' 36"
9	1	F. Kabirov (RUS); A. Belyaev (RUS); A. Mokeev (RUS)	Kamaz	2h 45' 21"	+ 00' 00"	1	F. Kabirov (RUS); A. Belyaev (RUS); A. Mokeev (RUS)	Kamaz	35h 30' 48"	+ 00' 00"
9	2	V. Chagin (RUS); S. Savostin (RUS); I. Shaysultanov (RUS)	Kamaz	2h 52' 59"	+ 07' 38"	2	V. Chagin (RUS); S. Savostin (RUS); I. Shaysultanov (RUS)	Kamaz	35h 34' 59"	+ 04' 11"
9	3	E. Nikolaev (RUS); V. Mizyukaev (RUS); V. Rybakov (RUS)	Kamaz	3h 00' 11"	+ 14' 50"	3	E. Nikolaev (RUS); V. Mizyukaev (RUS); V. Rybakov (RUS)	Kamaz	37h 34' 39"	+ 2h 03' 51"
10	1	V. Chagin (RUS); S. Savostin (RUS); I. Shaysultanov (RUS)	Kamaz	3h 21' 39"	+ 00' 00"	1	V. Chagin (RUS); S. Savostin (RUS); I. Shaysultanov (RUS)	Kamaz	38h 56' 38"	+ 00' 00"
10	2	F. Kabirov (RUS); A. Belyaev (RUS); A. Mokeev (RUS)	Kamaz	3h 43' 17"	+ 21' 38"	2	F. Kabirov (RUS); A. Belyaev (RUS); A. Mokeev (RUS)	Kamaz	39h 14' 05"	+ 17' 27"
10	3	M. van Vliet (NLD); S. Bruynkens (BEL); B. der Kinderen (NLD)	MAN	3h 56' 16"	+ 34' 37"	3	E. Nikolaev (RUS); V. Mizyukaev (RUS); V. Rybakov (RUS)	Kamaz	41h 40' 44"	+ 2h 44' 06"
11	1	V. Chagin (RUS); S. Savostin (RUS); I. Shaysultanov (RUS)	Kamaz	5h 12' 02"	+ 00' 00"	1	V. Chagin (RUS); S. Savostin (RUS); I. Shaysultanov (RUS)	Kamaz	44h 08' 40"	+ 00' 00"
11	2	J. Vila (ESP); M. Torrallardona (ESP); P. van Eerd (NLD)	Iveco	5h 23' 06"	+ 11' 04"	2	F. Kabirov (RUS); A. Belyaev (RUS); A. Mokeev (RUS)	Kamaz	44h 39' 11"	+ 30' 31"
11	3	F. Kabirov (RUS); A. Belyaev (RUS); A. Mokeev (RUS)	Kamaz	5h 25' 06"	+ 13' 04"	3	E. Nikolaev (RUS); V. Mizyukaev (RUS); V. Rybakov (RUS)	Kamaz	47h 07' 23"	+ 2h 58' 43"
12	1	V. Chagin (RUS); S. Savostin (RUS); I. Shaysultanov (RUS)	Kamaz	2h 45' 34"	+ 00' 00"	1	V. Chagin (RUS); S. Savostin (RUS); I. Shaysultanov (RUS)	Kamaz	46h 54' 14"	+ 00' 00"
12	2	F. Kabirov (RUS); A. Belyaev (RUS); A. Mokeev (RUS)	Kamaz	2h 46' 22"	+ 00' 48"	2	F. Kabirov (RUS); A. Belyaev (RUS); A. Mokeev (RUS)	Kamaz	47h 25' 33"	+ 31' 19"
12	3	J. Vila (ESP); M. Torrallardona (ESP); P. van Eerd (NLD)	Iveco	2h 50' 03"	+ 04' 29"	3	E. Nikolaev (RUS); V. Mizyukaev (RUS); V. Rybakov (RUS)	Kamaz	50h 09' 59"	+ 3h 15' 45"
13	1	F. Kabirov (RUS); A. Belyaev (RUS); A. Mokeev (RUS)	Kamaz	1h 33' 25"	+ 00' 00"	1	V. Chagin (RUS); S. Savostin (RUS); I. Shaysultanov (RUS)	Kamaz	48h 28' 54"	+ 00' 00"
13	2	V. Chagin (RUS); S. Savostin (RUS); I. Shaysultanov (RUS)	Kamaz	1h 34' 40"	+ 01' 15"	2	F. Kabirov (RUS); A. Belyaev (RUS); A. Mokeev (RUS)	Kamaz	48h 58' 58"	+ 30' 04"
13	3	F. Echter (GER); D. Ruf (GER); A. Klein (GER)	MAN	1h 35' 27"	+ 02' 02"	3	E. Nikolaev (RUS); V. Mizyukaev (RUS); V. Rybakov (RUS)	Kamaz	51h 49' 11"	+ 3h 20' 17"

== Final overall standings ==
=== Motorcycles ===
Pos.	No.	Competitor	Make	Entrant	Time	Difference
1	1	Marc Coma (ESP)	KTM 450 Rally	KTM MRW Rally Factory Team	51h 25' 00"	+ 00' 00"
2	2	Cyril Despres (FRA)	KTM 450 Rally	Team Red Bull KTM	51h 40' 04"	+ 15' 04"
3	4	Hélder Rodrigues (POR)	Yamaha	Team Yamaha Racing France Ipone	53h 05' 20"	+ 1h 40' 20"
4	3	Francisco López (CHI)	Aprilia	Team Giofil Aprilia	53h 34' 45"	+ 2h 09' 45"
5	10	Juan Pedrero (ESP)	KTM 450 Rally	KTM MRW Rally Factory Team	54h 32' 03"	+ 3h 07' 03"
6	6	Pål Anders Ullevålseter (NOR)	KTM 450 Rally	Team Scandinavia	54h 57' 56"	+ 3h 32' 56"
7	33	Jean de Azevedo (BRA)	KTM 450 Rally	Petrobras Lubrax	55h 24' 38"	+ 3h 59' 38"
8	11	Ruben Faria (POR)	KTM 450 Rally	Team Red Bull KTM 450 Rally	55h 38' 01"	+ 4h 13' 01"
9	15	Quinn Cody (USA)	Honda	Team Honda Europe	56h 17' 10"	+ 4h 52' 10"
10	21	Jacek Czachor (POL)	KTM 450 Rally	Orlen Team	57h 38' 41"	+ 6h 13' 41"

=== Quads ===
Pos.	No.	Competitor	Make	Time	Difference
1	252	Alejandro Patronelli (ARG)	Yamaha	63h 49' 47"	+ 00' 00"
2	255	Sebastián Halpern (ARG)	Yamaha	64h 49' 40"	+ 59' 53"
3	256	Łukasz Łaskawiec (POL)	Yamaha	70h 07' 25"	+ 6h 17' 38"
4	253	Christophe Declerck (FRA)	Polaris	70h 08' 17"	+ 6h 18' 30"
5	263	Pablo Copetti (ARG)	Yamaha	71h 04' 46"	+ 7h 14' 59"
6	273	Jorge Santamarina (ARG)	Honda	74h 49' 54"	+ 11h 00' 07"
7	280	Tomas Maffei (ARG)	Yamaha	81h 50' 58"	+ 18h 01' 11"
8	257	Daniel Mazzucco (ARG)	Can-Am	89h 01' 41"	+ 25h 11' 54"
9	259	Camélia Liparoti (ITA)	Yamaha	89h 05' 03"	+ 25h 15' 16"
10	267	Francisco López Balart (CHI)	Can-Am	99h 44' 48"	+ 35h 55' 01"

=== Cars ===
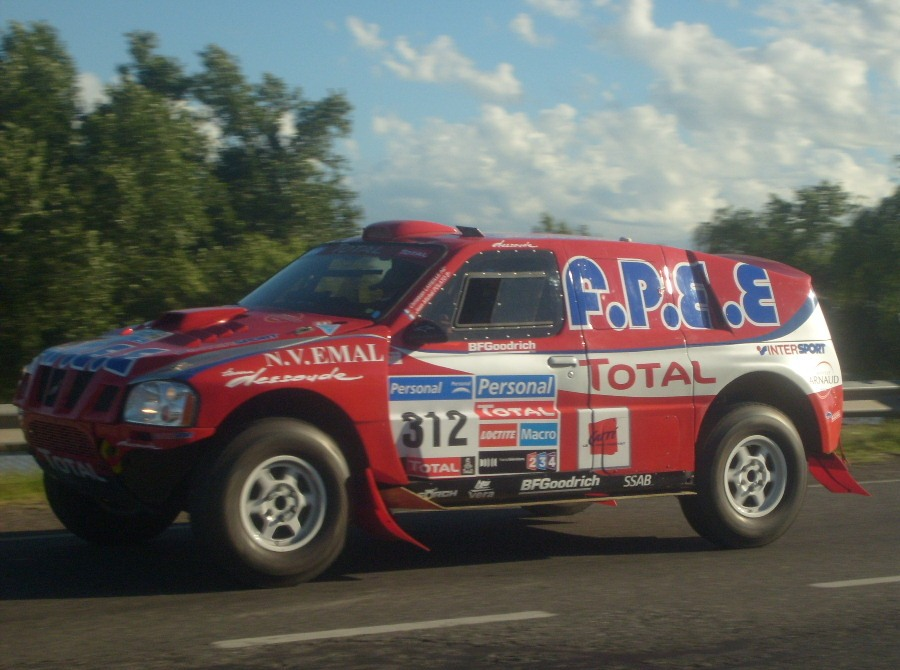
Nissan's Christian Lavieille finished the event in eighth place.

Pos.	No.	Driver	Co-Driver	Make	Entrant	Time	Difference
1	302	Nasser Al-Attiyah (QAT)	Timo Gottschalk (GER)	Volkswagen	Volkswagen Motorsport	45h 16' 16"	+ 00' 00"
2	308	Giniel de Villiers (RSA)	Dirk von Zitzewitz (GER)	Volkswagen	Volkswagen Motorsport	46h 05' 57"	+ 49' 41"
3	300	Carlos Sainz (ESP)	Lucas Cruz (ESP)	Volkswagen	Volkswagen Motorsport	46h 36' 54"	+ 1h 20' 38"
4	301	Stéphane Peterhansel (FRA)	Jean-Paul Cottret (FRA)	BMW	Monster X-Raid Team	47h 00' 04"	+ 1h 43' 48"
5	307	Krzysztof Hołowczyc (POL)	Jean-Marc Fortin (BEL)	BMW	Team X-Raid	49h 27' 37"	+ 4h 11' 21"
6	304	Mark Miller (USA)	Ralph Pitchford (RSA)	Volkswagen	Volkswagen Motorsport	50h 10' 58"	+ 4h 54' 42"
7	313	Ricardo Leal dos Santos (POR)	Paulo Fiuza (POR)	BMW	Monster X-Raid Team	52h 06' 23"	+ 6h 50' 07"
8	312	Christian Lavieille (FRA)	Jean-Michel Polato (FRA)	Nissan	Team Dessoude	53h 13' 34"	+ 7h 57' 18"
9	310	Guilherme Spinelli (BRA)	Youssef Haddad (BRA)	Mitsubishi	Mitsubishi Brazil	53h 39' 53"	+ 8h 23' 27"
10	314	Matthias Kahle (GER)	Thomas Schünemann (GER)	SMG Buggy	Hamburger Software SMG	60h 28' 12"	+ 15h 11' 56"

=== Trucks ===
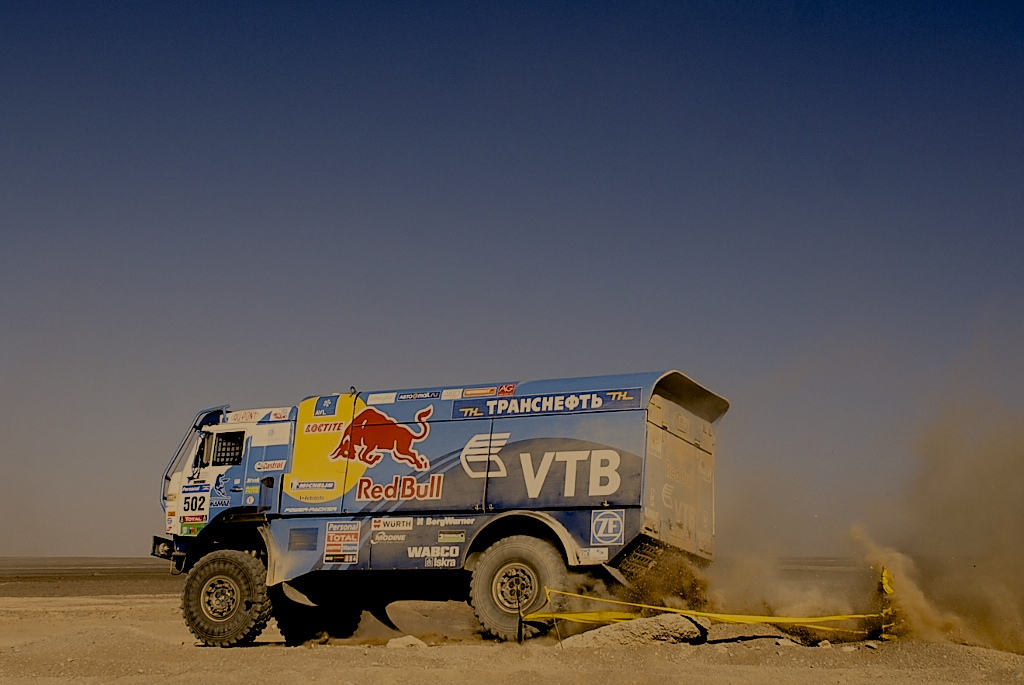
Firdaus Kabirov's Kamaz truck, which finished second behind Vladimir Chagin's similar truck.

Pos.	No.	Driver	Navigator	Mechanic	Make	Time	Difference
1	500	Vladimir Chagin (RUS)	Sergey Savostin (RUS)	Ildar Shaysultanov (RUS)	Kamaz	48h 28' 54"	+ 00' 00"
2	502	Firdaus Kabirov (RUS)	Aydar Belyaev (RUS)	Andrey Mokeev (RUS)	Kamaz	48h 58' 58"	+ 30' 04"
3	512	Eduard Nikolaev (RUS)	Viatcheslav Mizyukaev (RUS)	Vladimir Rybakov (RUS)	Kamaz	51h 49' 11"	+ 3h 20' 17"
4	518	Ilgizar Mardeev (RUS)	Vladimir Demyanenko (RUS)	Ayrat Mardeev (RUS)	Kamaz	54h 13' 50"	+ 5h 44' 56"
5	507	Franz Echter (GER)	Detlef Ruf (GER)	Artur Klein (GER)	MAN	54h 14' 31"	+ 5h 45' 37"
6	506	Josep Vila (ESP)	Moi Torrallardona (ESP)	Peter van Eerd (NED)	Iveco	55h 44' 55"	+ 7h 16' 01"
7	508	Marcel van Vliet (NED)	Serge Bruynkens (BEL)	Bernard der Kinderen (NED)	MAN	59h 10' 57"	+ 10h 42' 03"
8	537	Artur Ardavichus (KAZ)	Denis Berezovskiy (KAZ)	Zhanat Zhalimbetov (KAZ)	Kamaz	59h 38' 39"	+ 11h 09' 45"
9	526	Teruhito Sugawara (JPN)	Seiichi Suzuki (JPN)	none	Hino	62h 50' 22"	+ 14h 21' 28"
10	528	Mathias Behringer (GER)	Jochen Seiler (GER)	Hugo Kupper (NED)	MAN	66h 06' 29"	+ 17h 37' 35"

== Deaths ==
A total of four people were killed in Dakar-related incidents during the rally. A 28-year-old female spectator was killed when a competitor lost control of his vehicle in the first stage, while two mechanics were killed in separate electrical incidents and a driver lost his life in a collision with a rally competitor following the tenth stage.
