= Marcel van Vliet =

Dutch truck racer

Marcel van Vliet (born 7 October 1970, Gouda) is a Dutch truck racer, best known for participating in the Dakar Rally, in which he finished third in 2010 and seventh in 2011. In the 2012 edition he won the first stage. He has 3 daughters and he is one of the owners of a company called "GTE Group B.V." / Van Vliet Automotive.

== Notable results in Dakar Rally ==
- Winner of first stage, 2011
- Finished third overall, 2010
- Winner of first stage, 2009
