= Johannesburg International Motor Show =

Biennial motor show in South Africa

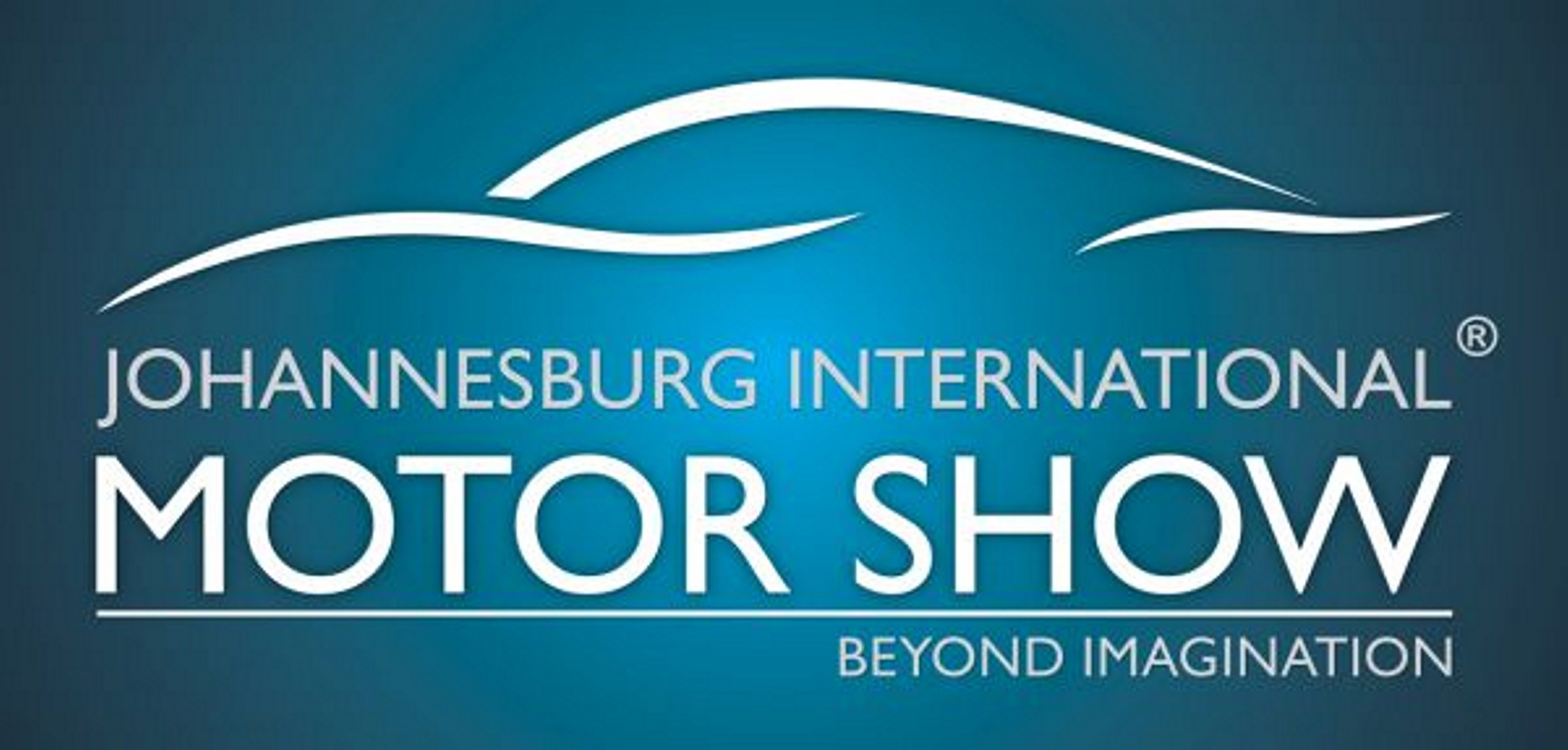
The Official Logo of the Johannesburg International Motor Show

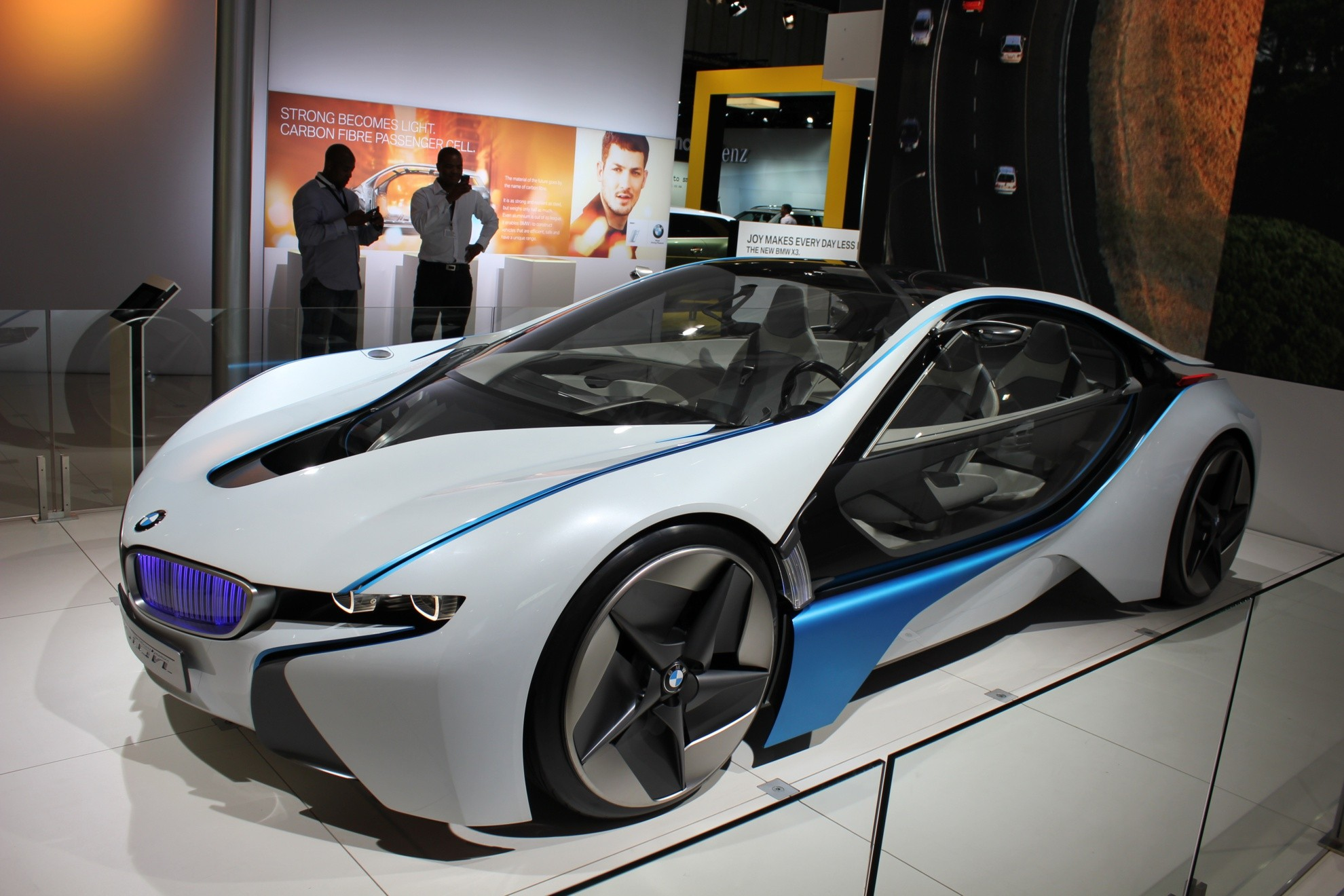
The BMW-I8 made its African Premiere at the Johannesburg International Motor Show 2011

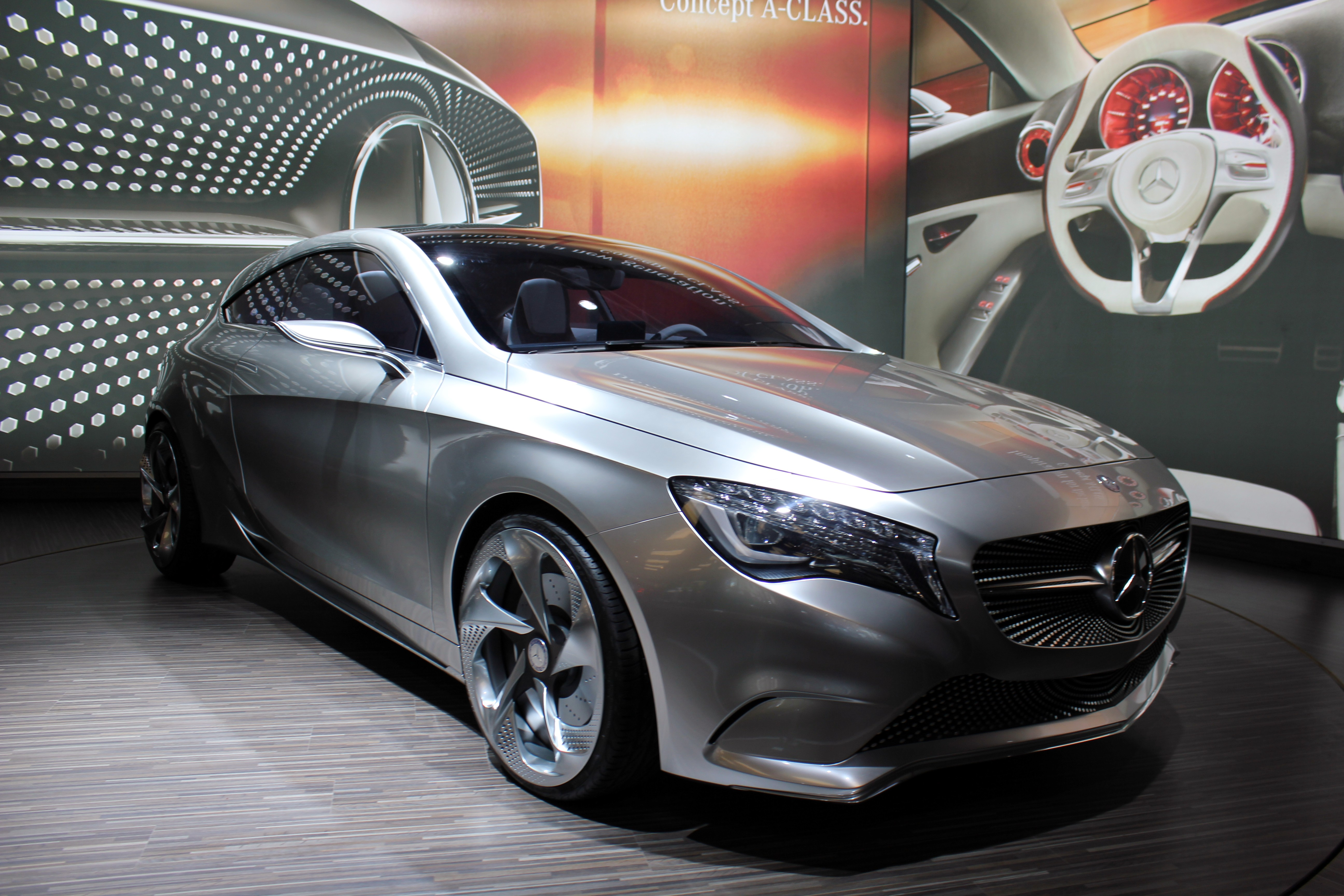
Image of the Mercedes-Benz A-Class Concept Car which made its South African Debut at the Johannesburg International Motor Show in 2011

The Johannesburg International Motor Show is a biennial Motor Show held in October in Johannesburg South Africa at the NASREC Johannesburg Expo Center. The Johannesburg International Motor Show is the biggest Auto Show in South Africa and attracts ± 250,000 people to the show when it is running.

== Description ==
The biennial Johannesburg International Motor Show is an eleven-day comprehensive automotive exhibition and automotive lifestyle event. The event is the only OICA accredited, internationally recognized motor show in Southern Africa. The event is a vertical automotive exhibition featuring displays, interactive activities, demonstrations and motoring events and features 45,000m² gross indoor exhibit space and some 40,000m² outdoor exhibition space.

=== 2011 ===
The 2011 Johannesburg Motor Show took place from 6 October 2011 to 16 October 2011 at the NASREC Johannesburg Expo Center. Visitors to the show could view Passenger cars, light and heavy commercial vehicles from most of the Automotive Manufacturers operating in South Africa.

The Johannesburg Motor Show Press Days were on 6 and 7 October 2011 and Open Public days from 7 to 16 October 2014.

==== Highlights ====
- The BMW I8 made its African Premiere at the Johannesburg International Motor Show in 2011.
- The Mercedes-Benz A-Class made its African Debut in 2011 as a Concept Car at the 2011 Johannesburg International Motor Show.
- Honda Asimo Brings Coffee and Drinks at the Johannesburg International Motor Show.
- The Toyota FJ Cruiser made its South Africa Debut at the Johannesburg International Motor Show 2011.
- Toyota South Africa announces that Giniel De Villiers will represent Toyota at the Dakar Rally.
