= Aleš Loprais =

Czech rally raid truck driver

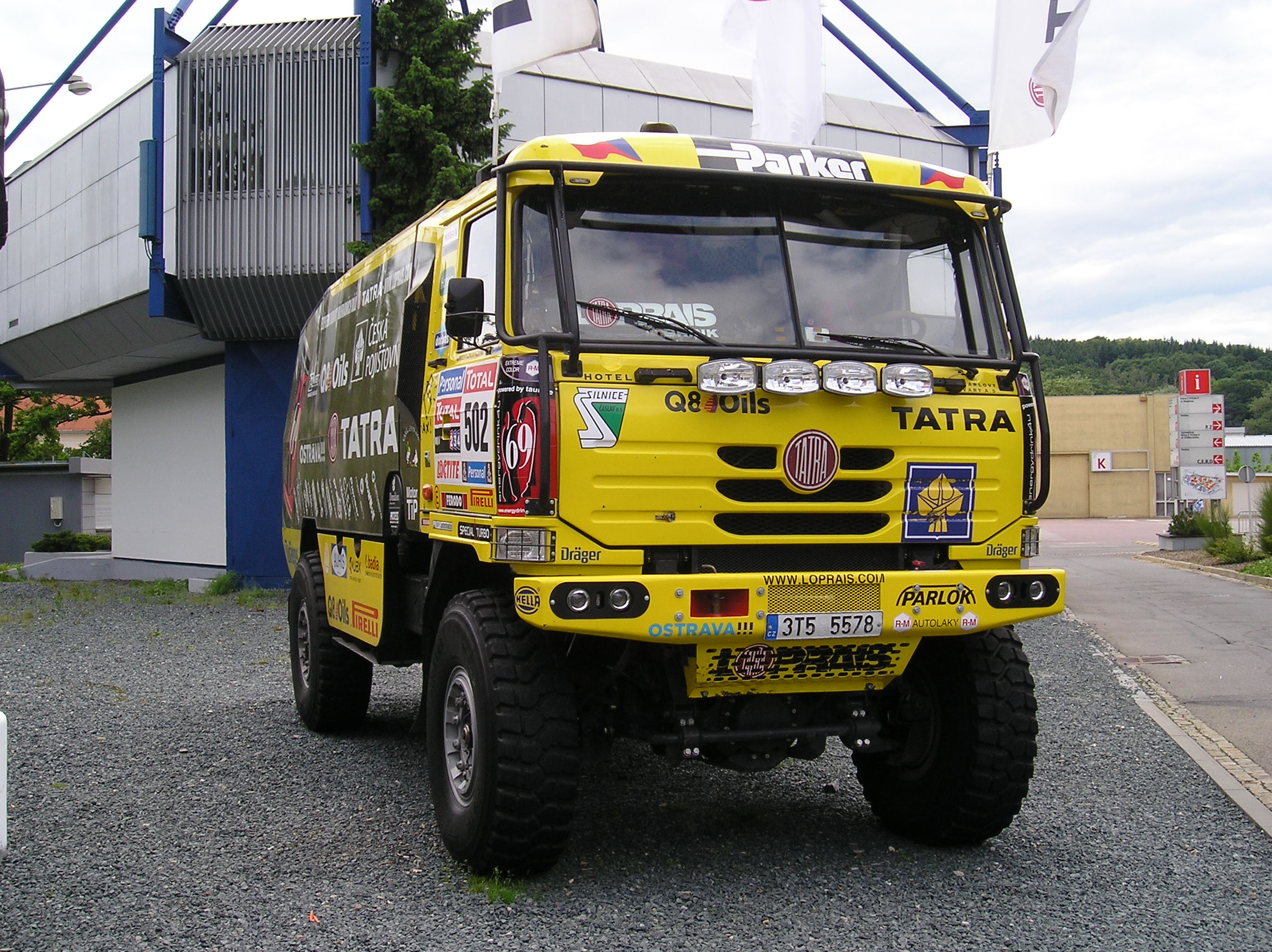
Loprais' 2009 Dakar Tatra on display in Brno.

Aleš Loprais (born 10 January 1980 in Olomouc) is a Czech rally raid truck driver. Loprais has a long association with Tatra and has been a frequent participant of the Dakar Rally, having also won the 2011 Silk Way Rally in the truck category.

== Career ==
Loprais is nephew of the highly successful Czech rally raid truck driver Karel Loprais. The younger Loprais first competed on the Dakar Rally in 2006 as navigator to his uncle Karel, and from 2007 he has competed as a driver for Tatra. Loprais has scored several stage victories in the Dakar Rally, his best overall result being third place in 2007. Apart from the Dakar Rally, Loprais competed in a number of other rally raid races, including the Silk Way Rally and the 2008 Central Europe Rally.

In 2023, Loprais was placed under police investigation after accidentally killing a spectator while competing in the Dakar Rally.

== Dakar Rally results ==
Year	Class	Vehicle	Position	Stages won
2006*	Trucks	(Czech Republic) Tatra	DNF	0
2007	Trucks	(Czech Republic) Tatra	3rd	1
2008	Trucks	(Czech Republic) Tatra		
2008	Trucks	(Czech Republic) Tatra	3rd	1
2009	Trucks	(Czech Republic) Tatra	DNF	0
2010	Trucks	(Czech Republic) Tatra	DNF	0
2011	Trucks	(Czech Republic) Tatra	DNF	2
2012	Trucks	(Czech Republic) Tatra	DNF	1
2013	Trucks	(Czech Republic) Tatra	6th	1
2014	Trucks	(Czech Republic) Tatra	6th	2
2015	Trucks	(Germany) MAN	4th	1
2016	Trucks	(Italy) Iveco	DNF	0
2017	Trucks	(Czech Republic) Tatra	7th	0
2018	Trucks	(Czech Republic) Tatra	DNF	1
2019	Trucks	(Czech Republic) Tatra	5th	0
2020	Trucks	(Czech Republic) Praga	7th	0
2021	Trucks	(Czech Republic) Praga	5th	0
2022	Trucks	(Czech Republic) Praga	21st	0
2023	Trucks	(Czech Republic) Praga	DNF	2
2024	Trucks	(Czech Republic) Praga	2nd	2
2025	Trucks	(Italy) Iveco	3rd	5
2026	Trucks	(Italy) Iveco	2nd	5

- Co-driver for Karel Loprais
- The 2008 Central Europe Rally was recognised as the 2008 edition of the Dakar because of ASO administrative decisions to move the race to central Europe.

== Silk Way Rally results ==
Year	Class	Vehicle	Position	Stages won
2009	Trucks	(Czech Republic) Tatra	3rd	1
2010	Trucks	(Czech Republic) Tatra	4th	0
2011	Trucks	(Czech Republic) Tatra	1st	1
2012	Trucks	(Czech Republic) Tatra	4th	0
2013	Trucks	(Czech Republic) Tatra	21st	0
2014–2015	Not held			
2016	Did not enter			
2017	Trucks	(Czech Republic) Tatra	DNF	0
