= 2026 Dakar Rally =

Off-road motorsport event in Saudi Arabia

Part of the Dakar Rally
← Previous event	Next event →
- Host country: Saudi Arabia
- Dates run: 3–17 January 2026
- Start: Yanbu
- Finish: Yanbu
- Stages: 14
- Stage surface: Sand, rocks, gravel, tarmac

Results
- Cars winner: (Qatar) Nasser Al-Attiyah (Belgium) Fabian Lurquin; The Dacia Sandriders
- Bikes winner: (Argentina) Luciano Benavides; Red Bull KTM Factory Racing
- Stock winner: (Lithuania) Rokas Baciuška (Spain) Oriol Vidal; Defender Rally
- Challenger winner: (Spain) Pau Navarro (Spain) Jan Rosa; BBR Motorsport
- SSVs winner: (United States) Brock Heger (United States) Max Eddy; Loeb Fraymedia Motorsport - Rzr Factory Racing
- Trucks winner: (Lithuania) Vaidotas Žala (Portugal) Paulo Fiuza (Netherlands) Max van Grol; Nørdis Team De Rooy Fpt
- Classics winner: (Lithuania) Karolis Raišys (France) Christophe Marques; Ovoko Racing
- Mission 1000 winner: (Spain) Jordi Juvanteny (Spain) José Luis Criado (Spain) Xavier Ribas; KH7-Ecovergy

The 2026 Dakar Rally was a rally raid event that took place from 3 to 17 January 2026 in Saudi Arabia. It is the 48th edition of the Dakar Rally, organized by Amaury Sport Organisation (ASO), and the 7th time Saudi Arabia has hosted the event.

The event featured as the first round of the 2026 World Rally-Raid Championship. Nasser Al-Attiyah won the rally in the cars class, his sixth victory in the event. Argentinian rider Luciano Benavides took victory in the bikes category.

== Background ==
The presentation and race outline will take place on 13 November 2025 in Paris, France.

This year, the route will start and finish in Yanbu passing through Ha'il's desert stages, Al-Qassim, and to Riyadh for the rest day. Notably skipping the Empty Quarter, the rally will head west to new regions previously unexplored by the event to Al-Bahah, Aseer, and Jizan.

The race will consist of 14 days of racing, divided into the prologue and 13 stages. There will be four loop stages and four split route stages in two back-to-back pairs, with the cars and trucks taking a separate route to the bikes.

Competitors face a hybrid 48h Chrono/marathon on stage four, with a bare-bones bivouac where mutual assistance is permitted without time limits and class T5.2 trucks reach the bivouac to assist competitors. Stage nine to 10 will be a more traditional marathon still with a minimal bivouac.

Alternative zero-emission or hybrid drives are represented again by the Mission 1000 category now in its third year.

== Timeline ==
- 7 June–20 October 2025: Registrations open.
- 27–29 November 2025: Scrutineering and vehicle loading in Barcelona.
- 30 December 2025: Vehicle offloading in Yanbu.
- 1–2 January 2026: Final scrutineering in Yanbu.
- 3 January 2026: Starting podium and the Prologue Stage.
- 17 January 2026: Race finish and finish podium.

== Entry List ==
=== Number of entries ===
Stage	Bikes	Cars	Stock	Challenger (T3)	SSV (T4)	Trucks	Total	Classic Cars	Classic Trucks	Total Classic
Entry list (Note: As of 18 December, amended.)	116	73	8	37	41	46	321	75	22	97
At start line	115	72	7	37	41	45	317	75	22	97
Rest day (Note: At start line after the rest day.)	99	65	7	35	40	40	286	74	18	92
Finished (Note: To rank in the final standings, the vehicle had to pass through the finishing podium.)	90	60	7	33	30	22	242	73	18	91

=== Vehicles and Categories ===
Vehicles and Categories

The 2026 event allows for the entry of SCORE class vehicles - only one competitor entered with this type of vehicle. It also makes the distinction between turbocharged and naturally aspirated vehicles the Challenger (T3) class .

Bikes		Cars		Stock		Challenger		SSV		Trucks		Classic Cars		Classic Trucks	
Class	Description	Class	Description	Class	Description	Class	Description	Class	Description	Class	Description	Description	Class	Description	Class
RallyGP	FIM World Rally-Raid Championship (up to 450cc)	T1.+ Ultimate	Prototype Cross-Country Cars 4x4	STK Stock	Series Production Cross-Country Cars	CHG1	Lightweight Prototype Cross-Country Vehicles (turbo up to 1,050cc)	SSV1	Cross-Country Side-by-Side (SSV) Vehicles turbo up to 1050cc and atmo from 1050cc to 2000cc	T5.U	“Ultimate” prototype Cross-Country Trucks	−86 Low Average	H1.A	−86 Low Average	H1t.A
Rally2	FIM World Rally-Raid Cup (up to 450cc)	T1.1 Ultimate	Prototype Cross-Country Cars 4x4	T2.1 Stock	Production Cross-Country Cars	CHG2	Lightweight Prototype Cross-Country Vehicles (NA up to 1,050cc)	SSV2	Cross-Country Side-by-Side (SSV) Vehicles atmo up to 1050cc	T5.1	Prototype and Production Cross-Country Trucks	−86 Moderate Average	H2.A	−86 Moderate Average	H2t.A
		T1.2 Ultimate	Prototype Cross-Country Cars 4x2	T2.2 Stock	Production Cross-Country Vehicles with expired certification	T3.U	Lightweight Prototype Cross-Country Vehicles	T4	Modified Production Cross-Country Side-by-Side	T5.2	Race Service Trucks	−86 Intermediate Average	H3.A	86–98 Low Average	H1t.B
		T1.3	SCORE Cross-Country cars			CHGS	SCORE UTV vehicles					86–98 Low Average	H1.B	86–98 Moderate Average	H2t.B
		ULTS Ultimate	SCORE Truck or Buggy vehicles									86–98 Moderate Average	H2.B	99-05 Low Average	H1t.C
												86–98 Intermediate Average	H3.B	99-05 Moderate Average	H2t.C
												86–98 High Average	H4.B		
												99-05 Moderate Average	H2.C		
												99-05 Intermediate Average	H3.C		
												99-05 High Average	H4.C		

=== Competitor list ===
Entry list – Bikes

Note
– "Dakar Legends": competitors that participated in 10 or more Dakar events.
– "Rookies": competitors who will participate for the first time.
– Competitors that were not able to start the race.
– "Original by Motul" — Competitors participating in the "Original by Motul", previously known as "Malle Moto", a marathon class with limited assistance.
^{VJW} – Subclasses for Veteran, Junior, Women.

No.	Rider	Bike	Team	Class
1	(Australia) Daniel Sanders	KTM 450 Rally Factory	Red Bull KTM Factory Racing	RallyGP
7	(South Africa) Bradley Cox	Sherco 450 Rally	Sherco Rally Factory	RallyGP
9	(United States) Ricky Brabec	Honda CRF 450	Monster Energy Honda HRC	RallyGP
10	(United States) Skyler Howes	Honda CRF 450	Monster Energy Honda HRC	RallyGP
11	(Chile) José Ignacio Cornejo	Hero 450 Rally	Hero Motosports Team Rally	RallyGP
14	(South Africa) Michael Docherty	KTM 450 Rally Factory Replica	BAS World KTM Team	Rally2
15	(Spain) Lorenzo Santolino	Sherco 450 Rally	Sherco Rally Factory	RallyGP
16	(Slovenia) Toni Mulec	KTM 450 Rally Factory Replica	BAS World KTM Team	Rally2
17	(United Arab Emirates) Mohammed Albalooshi	Honda CRF 450	Rsmoto Rally Team	RallyGP
18	(Czech Republic) Dusan Drdaj	KTM 450 Rally Factory Replica	Cajdasrot	Rally2
20	(India) Harith Noah	Sherco 450 Rally	Sherco Rally Factory	Rally2
23	(Czech Republic) Martin Michek	Hoto Rally	Hoto Factory Racing	RallyGP
24	(Saudi Arabia) Abdulhalim Al Mogeera	KTM 450 Rally Factory Replica	Hlm	Rally2
25	(Belgium) Jérôme Martiny	Honda CRF 450	Anquety Motor Sport	Rally2
26	(Poland) Konrad Dąbrowski	KTM 450 Rally Factory Replica	Duust Rally Team	Rally2^{J}
27	(Czech Republic) Milan Engel	Kove 450 Rally	Orion - Moto Racing Group	Rally2
28	(Lithuania) Nerimantas Jucius	Honda CRF 450	HT Rally Raid	Rally2
29	(Italy) Paolo Lucci	Honda CRF 450	Rsmoto HRC Race Service	Rally2
30	(France) Mathieu Doveze	KTM 450 Rally Factory Replica	BAS World KTM Team	Rally2
32	(Italy) Tommaso Montanari	Husqvarna 450 Rally Factory Replica	Solarys Racing	Rally2
33	(Denmark) Thomas Kongshøj	KTM 450 Rally Factory Replica	Tkr	Rally2
34	(Romania) Emanuel Gyenes	KTM 450 Rally Factory Replica	Autonet Motorcycle Team	Rally2
35	(Portugal) Bruno Santos	Husqvarna 450 Rally Factory Replica	Bs - Frutas Patricia Pilar	Rally2
36	(Czech Republic) David Pabiška	KTM 450 Rally Factory Replica	Sp Moto Bohemia Racing Team	Rally2^{V}
37	(Argentina) Leonardo Cola	KTM 450 Rally Factory Replica	Joyride Race Service	Rally2
38	(France) Jérôme Bas	KTM 450 Rally Factory Replica	Universal Ride	Rally2
39	(France) Benjamin Melot	KTM 450 Rally Factory Replica	Esprit KTM	Rally2
40	(China) Zhao Hongyi	KTM 450 Rally Factory Replica	Joyride Race Service	Rally2
41	(Chile) Ruy Barbosa	Honda CRF 450	HT Rally Raid	Rally2
42	(France) Adrien Van Beveren	Honda CRF 450	Monster Energy Honda HRC	RallyGP
43	(Brazil) Luciano Gomes	KTM 450 Rally Factory Replica	Challenger Racing Team	Rally2^{V}
44	(Spain) Josep Pedró	Husqvarna 450 Rally Replica	Rallybikes - Pedregà Team	Rally2
45	(China) Sunier Sunier	Kove 450 Rally	Kove Factory Racing	Rally2
46	(Botswana) Ross Branch	Hero 450 Rally	Hero Motosports Team Rally	RallyGP
47	(Poland) Bartlomiej Tabin	Kove 450 Rally	Orion - Moto Racing Group	Rally2^{V}
49	(Argentina) Juan Santiago Rostan	KTM 450 Rally Factory Replica	Xraids Experience	Rally2
50	(United Kingdom) James Hillier	Kove 450 Rally	Muc-off Racing	Rally2
51	(Spain) Rachid Al-Lal Lahadil	Husqvarna 450 Rally Factory Replica	Melilla Ciudad Del Deporte	Rally2^{V}
52	(France) Antoine Detourbet	KTM 450 Rally Factory Replica	Antoine Detourbet	Rally2
53	(Greece) Vasilis Boudros	KTM 450 Rally Factory Replica	Dna Filters - Enduro Greece Rally Team	Rally2
55	(France) Florian Bancilhon	KTM 450 Rally Factory Replica	Bancilhon Florian	Rally2
56	(China) Zhang Min	KTM 450 Rally Factory Replica	Joyride Race Service	Rally2^{V}
57	(Mongolia) Khaliunbold Erdenebileg	KTM 450 Rally Factory Replica	BAS World KTM Team	Rally2
58	(Lithuania) Dovydas Karka	Honda CRF 450	HT Rally Raid	Rally2
60	(France) Matthieu Jauffraud	KTM 450 Rally Factory Replica	Jauffraud Racing Team	Rally2
61	(France) Bertrand Domet	KTM 450 Rally Factory Replica	Team Casteu Trophy	Rally2
62	(Czech Republic) Martin Prokeš	KTM 450 Rally Factory Replica	Moto Racing Krasne Pole	Rally2
63	(United Kingdom) Neil Hawker	Honda CRF 450	Team Ikuzawa	Rally2
64	(Switzerland) Alexandre Vaudan	KTM 450 Rally Factory Replica	Team Casteu Trophy	Rally2
65	(France) Guillaume Chollet	KTM 450 Rally Factory Replica	Xraids Experience	Rally2
66	(France) Neels Theric	Kove 450 Rally	Kove Factory Racing	Rally2
67	(Germany) Dennis Mildenberger	KTM 450 Rally Factory Replica	Joyride Race Service	Rally2^{V}
68	(Spain) Tosha Schareina	Honda CRF 450	Monster Energy Honda HRC	RallyGP
69	(Saudi Arabia) Ahmed Al Jaber	KTM 450 Rally Factory Replica	Hleem	Rally2
70	(Guatemala) Francisco Arredondo	Honda 450 Rally Factory Replica	BAS World KTM Team	Rally2^{V}
71	(Italy) Cesare Zacchetti	Honda CRF 450	Rsmoto Rally Team	Rally2^{V}
72	(Czech Republic) Jiri Broz	KTM 450 Rally Factory	BAS World KTM Team	Rally2
73	(Spain) Edgar Canet	KTM 450 Rally Factory	Red Bull KTM Factory Racing	RallyGP
74	(Portugal) Nuno Silva	KTM 450 Rally Factory Replica	Old Friends Rally Team	Rally2^{V}
75	(United States) Brandon Krause	KTM 450 Rally Factory Replica	BAS World KTM Team	Rally2
76	(Poland) Robert Przybyłowski	Honda CRF 450	HT Rally Raid	Rally2^{V}
77	(Argentina) Luciano Benavides	KTM 450 Rally Factory	Red Bull KTM Factory Racing	RallyGP
78	(Spain) Arnau Lledó	KTM 450 Rally Factory Replica	Pedregà Team	Rally2^{J}
79	(Mongolia) Murun Purevdorj	KTM 450 Rally Factory Replica	Xraids Experience	Rally2
80	(United Kingdom) Robbie Wallace	KTM 450 Rally Factory Replica	Xraids Experience	Rally2
81	(Lithuania) Saulius Klevinskas	Husqvarna 450 Rally Factory Replica	Ag Rally Dubai Alfafence	Rally2
82	(India) Jatin Jain	Kove 450 Rally	Desert Storm	Rally2^{V}
83	(Saudi Arabia) Badr Al Hamdan	Kove 450 Rally	Desert Storm	Rally2
84	(Portugal) Martim Ventura	Honda CRF 450	Honda HRC	Rally2
85	(United States) Preston Campbell	Honda CRF 450	Honda HRC	Rally2
86	(France) Charlie Herbst	GasGas 450 Rally Factory Replica	Challenger Racing Team	Rally2
87	(France) Thierry Bethys	KTM 450 Rally Factory Replica	Tbracing	Rally2^{V}
88	(France) Guillaume Jaunin	GasGas RX 450F	Team Nomade Racing	Rally2^{V}
89	(Lebanon) Ehab Al Hakeem	Fantic 450 Rally Factory Replica	Desert Storm	Rally2
90	(Slovenia) Simon Marcic	Husqvarna 450 Rally Factory Replica	Team Marcic	Rally2
91	(Lithuania) Edvard Sokolovski	KTM 450 Rally Factory Replica	Hiltus-ag Rally Dubai	Rally2
92	(France) Christopher Jautard	KTM 450 Rally Factory Replica	Team Nomade Racing	Rally2
93	(Italy) Tiziano Interno	KTM 450 Rally Factory Replica	Rally Pov	Rally2
94	(France) Nicolas Horeaux	KTM 450 Rally Factory Replica	Team Nomade Racing	Rally2
95	(Spain) Juan Carlos Torres	Husqvarna 450 Rally Factory Replica	Motoclub Albacete	Rally2^{V}
96	(Austria) Tobias Ebster	Hero 450 Rally	Hero Motosports Team Rally	Rally2
98	(United States) Mason Klein	Hoto Rally	Hoto Factory Racing	RallyGP
99	(Spain) Javier Vega	Kove 450 Rally	Pont Grup - Kove	Rally2
100	(Italy) Manuel Lucchese	Honda CRF 450	Rebel x	Rally2
101	(Germany) Maxi Schek	KTM 450 Rally Factory Replica	Maxi Schek Motorsport	Rally2
102	(Australia) David Brock	KTM 450 Rally Factory Replica	Joyride Race Service	Rally2^{V}
103	(Lithuania) Gediminas Satkus	KTM 450 Rally Factory Replica	Ag Rally Dubai	Rally2
104	(France) Rémy Moreau	KTM 450 Rally Factory Replica	Team Nomade Racing	Rally2
105	(France) Benjamin Pousset	KTM 450 Rally Factory Replica	Live in a Rear Wheel	Rally2
106	(Italy) Mattia Riva	KTM 450 Rally Factory Replica	Solarys Racing	Rally2
107	(Lebanon) Eid Rafic	QJMotor 450 Rally	Rsmoto Rally Team	Rally2^{V}
108	(China) Haoyu Shi	Hoto Rally	Hoto Factory Racing	Rally2^{J}
109	(United Kingdom) Craig Searles	Husqvarna 450 Rally Factory Replica	S2d Race Team	Rally2
110	(United Kingdom) Carl Searles	Husqvarna 450 Rally Factory Replica	S2d Race Team	Rally2
111	(France) Ludwig Messager	Husqvarna 450 Rally Factory Replica	Lb Racing	Rally2
114	(France) Charles Pick	Husqvarna 450 Rally Factory Replica	Team Nomade Racing	Rally2
115	(Spain) Mario Garrido	KTM 450 Rally Factory Replica	Pedregà Team	Rally2
116	(Portugal) Pedro Pinheiro	Husqvarna 450 Rally Factory Replica	Old Friends Rally Team	Rally2
117	(Spain) Ricardo Lastra	KTM 450 Rally Factory Replica	Old Friends Rally Team	Rally2^{V}
119	(Spain) Fernando Dominguez	KTM 450 Rally Factory Replica	Cuenca Diputacion 2026	Rally2^{V}
120	(France) Matthieu Cauvin	KTM 450 Rally Factory Replica	Team Nomade Racing	Rally2
121	(France) Thibault Boucherot	KTM 450 Rally Factory Replica	Team Nomade Racing	Rally2
123	(Poland) Filip Grot	KTM 450 Rally Factory Replica	BAS World KTM Team	Rally2^{J}
124	(Italy) Andrea Gava	Kove 450 Rally	Kove Italia Racing Team	Rally2
125	(Japan) Shinya Fujiwara	Honda CRF 450	Rsmoto HRC Race Service	Rally2
127	(South Africa) Ronald Venter	KTM 450 Rally Factory Replica	Team Nomade Racing	Rally2
129	(Spain) Borja Pérez	Husqvarna 450 Rally Factory Replica	Melilla Ciudad Del Deporte	Rally2
130	(Spain) Iñigo Zardoya	KTM 450 Rally Factory Replica	Joyride Race Service	Rally2
132	(Spain) Carlos López	KTM 450 Rally Factory Replica	Pedregà Team	Rally2
134	(Germany) Markus Hertlein	Honda CRF 450	HT Rally Raid	Rally2
135	(United States) Nathan Rafferty	KTM 450 Rally Factory Replica	BAS World KTM Team	Rally2^{V}
136	(Netherlands) Ian Olthof	Honda CRF 450	HT Rally Raid	Rally2
137	(France) Mathieu Troquier	KTM 450 Rally Factory Replica	22 Tout Terrain	Rally2
138	(Spain) Joan Guillén	Husqvarna 450 Rally Factory Replica	Pedregà Team	Rally2
139	(France) Romain Bouzigon	KTM 450 Rally Factory Replica	Esprit KTM	Rally2
142	(Slovakia) Štefan Svitko	KTM 450 Rally Factory Replica	Slovnaft Rally Team	RallyGP
148	(Chile) Tomas de Gavardo	KTM 450 Rally Factory	BAS World KTM Team	Rally2

Entry list – Cars

Note
– The "Dakar Legends" – competitors that participated in 10 or more Dakar events.
– The first time starters – "rookies".
– Competitors that were not able to start the race.

No.	Driver	Navigator	Vehicle	Team	Group
201	(Saudi Arabia) Yazeed Al-Rajhi	(Germany) Timo Gottschalk	Toyota Hilux GR	Overdrive Racing	T1+
202	(South Africa) Henk Lategan	(South Africa) Brett Cummings	Toyota Hilux GR	Toyota Gazoo Racing W2RC	T1+
203	(United States) Seth Quintero	(United States) Andrew Short	Toyota Hilux GR	Toyota Gazoo Racing W2RC	T1+
204	(Australia) Toby Price	(Spain) Armand Monleon	Toyota Hilux GR	Toyota Gazoo Racing W2RC	T1+
205	(Poland) Eryk Goczał	(Poland) Szymon Gospodarczyk	Toyota Hilux	Energylandia Rally Team	T1+
206	(Poland) Marek Goczał	(Poland) Maciej Marton	Toyota Hilux	Energylandia Rally Team	T1+
207	(France) Jean-Luc Ceccaldi	(France) Pascal Delacour	Optimus MD Rallye	JLC Racing	T1.2
208	(France) Lionel Baud	(France) Lucie Baud	Mini JCW Rally 3.0D	X-raid Mini JCW	T1+
209	(Poland) Michal Goczał	(Spain) Diego Ortega	Toyota Hilux	Energylandia Rally Team	T1+
210	(Chile) Hernán Garcés	(Chile) Juan Pablo Latrach	Toyota Hilux	Overdrive Racing	T1+
211	(Argentina) Juan Cruz Yacopini	(Spain) Daniel Oliveras	Toyota Hilux IMT EVO	Toyota Gazoo Racing SA	T1+
212	(Spain) Cristina Gutiérrez	(Spain) Pablo Moreno	Dacia Sandrider	The Dacia Sandriders	T1+
213	(South Africa) Saood Variawa	(France) François Cazalet	Toyota Hilux IMT EVO	Toyota Gazoo Racing SA	T1+
214	(France) Mathieu Serradori	(France) Loïc Minaudier	Century CR7	Century Racing Factory Team	T1+
215	(China) Biaobiao Zhang	(China) Wenke Ma	JJ-Sport JJ3	JJ Sport	T1+
216	(Lithuania) Benediktas Vanagas	(Lithuania) Aisvydas Paliukenas	Toyota Hilux	Gurtam Toyota Gazoo Racing Baltics	T1+
217	(Kyrgyzstan) Denis Krotov	(Kyrgyzstan) Konstantin Zhiltsov	Ford Raptor	M-Sport Rally Raid Team	T1+
218	(South Africa) Guy Botterill	(Spain) Oriol Mena	Toyota Hilux IMT EVO	Toyota Gazoo Racing SA	T1+
219	(France) Sébastien Loeb	(France) Edouard Boulanger	Dacia Sandrider	The Dacia Sandriders	T1+
220	(China) Wei Han	(China) Li Ma	Han Wei Motorsport HWM T1+	Hanwei Motorsport Team	T1+
221	(Czech Republic) Martin Prokop	(Czech Republic) Viktor Chytka	Ford Raptor	Orlen Jipocar Team	T1+
222	(Belgium) Guillaume De Mévius	(France) Mathieu Baumel	Mini JCW Rally 3.0i	X-raid Mini JCW	T1+
223	(Brazil) Lucas Moraes	(Germany) Dennis Zenz	Dacia Sandrider	The Dacia Sandriders	T1+
224	(South Africa) Brian Baragwanath	(South Africa) Leonard Cremer	Century CR7	Century Racing Factory Team	T1+
225	(Spain) Carlos Sainz	(Spain) Lucas Cruz	Ford Raptor	Ford Racing	T1+
226	(Sweden) Mattias Ekström	(Sweden) Emil Bergkvist	Ford Raptor	Ford Racing	T1+
227	(Spain) Nani Roma	(Spain) Alex Haro	Ford Raptor	Ford Racing	T1+
228	(United States) Mitch Guthrie	(United States) Kellon Walch	Ford Raptor	Ford Racing	T1+
229	(Germany) Daniel Schröder	(South Africa) Henry Carl Köhne	Volkswagen Amarok	Ps Laser Racing	T1+
230	(France) Christian Lavieille	(France) Valentin Sarreaud	Optimus MD Rallye	MD Rallye Sport	T1.2
231	(Spain) Ferran Jubany	(Spain) Marc Sola	Optimus MD Rallye	MD Rallye Sport	T1.2
232	(Spain) Laia Sanz	(Italy) Maurizio Gerini	Ebro S800 XRR	Ebro Audax Motorsport	T1+
233	(Spain) Isidre Esteve	(Spain) José María Villalobos	Toyota Hilux	Repsol Toyota Rally Team	T1+
234	(France) Simon Vitse	(France) Max Delfino	Optimus MD Rallye	MD Rallye Sport	T1.2
235	(France) Ronan Chabot	(France) Gilles Pillot	Toyota Hilux	Overdrive Racing	T1+
236	(France) Romain Dumas	(France) Alexandre Winocq	Ford Raptor	RD Limited	T1+
237	(Brazil) Marcos Moraes	(Brazil) Fabrio Pedroso	Toyota Hilux IMT EVO	SVR	T1+
238	(France) Jean Remy Bergounhe	(France) Anthony Pes	Optimus MD Rallye	MD Rallye Sport	T1.2
239	(United Arab Emirates) Sh. Khalid Alqasimi	(United Arab Emirates) Khalid Alkendi	Toyota Hilux IMT EVO	SVR	T1+
240	(Portugal) Joao Ferreira	(Portugal) Filipe Palmeiro	Toyota Hilux IMT EVO	Toyota Gazoo Racing SA	T1+
241	(Lithuania) Gintas Petrus	(Kazakhstan) Nursultan Abykayev	Optimus MD Rallye	Petrus Racing Team	T1.2
242	(Czech Republic) Miroslav Zapletal	(Slovakia) Marek Sykora	Ford F150 Evo	OffRoadSport	T1+
243	(China) Binglong Lu	(China) He Sha	JJ-Sport JJ3	JJ Sport	T1+
244	(Spain) Jesús Calleja	(Spain) Eduardo Blanco	Santana Pickup T1+	Santana Racing Team	T1+
245	(China) Po Tian	(China) Simuren Ha	Han Wei Motorsport HWM T1+	Hanwei Motorsport Team	T1+
246	(Czech Republic) Karel Trneny	(Czech Republic) Václav Pritzl	Ford 150 EVO	X-force Accr Czech Team	T1+
247	(Netherlands) Tim Coronel	(Netherlands) Tom Coronel	Century CR7	Team Coronel	T1+
248	(Portugal) Maria Gameiro	(Spain) Rosa Romero	Mini JCW Rally 3.0D	X-raid Mini JCW	T1+
249	(Netherlands) Maik Willems	(Netherlands) Jasper Riezebos	Toyota Hilux	Bastion Hotels Team	T1+
250	(Seychelles) Aliyyah Koloc	(Poland) Marcin Pasek	Red-Lined Revo T1+	Buggyra Zm Racing	T1+
251	(Czech Republic) Martin Koloc	(Italy) Mirko Brun	Red-Lined Revo T1+	Buggyra Zm Racing	T1+
252	(France) Benoît Fretin	(France) Cédric Duplé	Century CR6	Ydeo Competition	T1.2
253	(Netherlands) Janus van Kasteren	(Netherlands) Marcel Snijders	Century CR7	Shiver Offroad	T1+
254	(Netherlands) Dave Klaassen	(Netherlands) Tessa Klaassen	DKR EVO Ultimate	Daklapack Rallysport	T1+
255	(China) Yuqiao Zhao	(China) Haibo Gui	JJ-Sport JJ3	JJ Sport	T1+
256	(Germany) Jürgen Schröder	(South Africa) Stuart Gregory	Volkswagen Amarok	Ps Laser Racing	T1+
257	(Netherlands) Roger Grouwels	(Netherlands) Rudolf Meijer	Century CR7	Shiver Offroad	T1+
258	(France) François Cousin	(France) Stéphane Cousin	Optimus MD Rallye	Compagnie Des Dunes	T1.2
259	(China) Yongming Tao	(China) Liguo Fu	JJ-Sport JJ3	JJ Sport	T1+
260	(France) Bruno Miot	(France) Christophe Crespo	Optimus MD Rallye	MD Rallye Sport	T1.2
261	(China) Benyang Xu	(China) Lei Tian	JJ-Sport JJ3	JJ Sport	T1+
262	(China) Guorui Wang	(China) Yu Tian	Longmai Motorsport WGR T1+	Longmai Motorsport	T1+
263	(Netherlands) Michiel Becx	(Netherlands) Wouter de Graaff	Century CR7	Shiver Offroad	T1+
265	(Canada) Nathan Hayashi	(Canada) Shane Hairsine	Ford Bronco Raptor	The Gear Shop Canada TM	T1.3
266	(Spain) Pedro Peñate	(Spain) Daniel Mesa	Century CR6	Th-trucks Team	T1.2
267	(Austria) Mark Mustermann	(Austria) Michael Zajc	Toyota Hilux	Mm Rallye	T1+
268	(Italy) Silvio Totani	(Italy) Tito Totani	Optimus MD Rallye	MD Rallye Sport	T1.2
269	(Greece) Jourdan Serderidis	(Luxembourg) Grégoire Munster	Ford Raptor	M-Sport Rally Raid Team	T1+
270	(Saudi Arabia) Khaled Al Jafla	(Lithuania) Andrey Rudnitski	Toyota Hilux IMT EVO	SVR	T1+
271	(China) Gaoxiang Fan	(China) Kai Zhao	JJ-Sport JJ3	JJ Sport	T1+
272	(Spain) Jordi Torras	(Spain) Santiago Costa	Optimus MD Rallye	MD Rallye Sport	T1.2
278	(France) Jean Pierre Strugo	(France) Kevin Morel	Optimus MD Rallye	MD Rallye Sport	T1.2
299	(Qatar) Nasser Al-Attiyah	(Belgium) Fabian Lurquin	Dacia Sandrider	The Dacia Sandriders	T1+

Entry list – Stock

Note
– The "Dakar Legends" – competitors that participated in 10 or more Dakar events.
– The first time starters – "rookies".
– Competitors that were not able to start the race.

No.	Driver	Navigator	Vehicle	Team	Group
500	(France) Stéphane Peterhansel	(France) Michaël Metge	Defender Dakar D7X-R	Defender Rally	STK
501	(Japan) Akira Miura	(France) Jean-Michel Polato	Toyota Land Cruiser GR Sport	Team Land Cruiser Toyota Auto Body	STK
502	(Lithuania) Rokas Baciuška	(Spain) Oriol Vidal	Defender Dakar D7X-R	Defender Rally	STK
503	(France) Ronald Basso	(France) Julien Menard	Toyota Land Cruiser GR Sport	Team Land Cruiser Toyota Auto Body	STK
504	(United States) Sara Price	(United States) Sean Berriman	Defender Dakar D7X-R	Defender Rally	STK
505	(Hungary) Peter Hamza	(Austria) Andras Kalmar	Nissan Patrol	Tireman Racing	T2.1
506	(Turkmenistan) Shamyrat Gurbanov	(Turkmenistan) Serdar Mollamyradov	Toyota Land Cruiser 200	Kamil Auto Sport Club	T2.1
507	(Saudi Arabia) Majed Al Thunayan	(Saudi Arabia) Hani Al Noumesi	Nissan Patrol	Torq Racing	T2.1

Entry list – Challenger (T3)

Note
– The "Dakar Legends" – competitors that participated in 10 or more Dakar events.
– The first time starters – "rookies".
– Competitors that were not able to start the race.

No.	Driver	Navigator	Vehicle	Team	Group
300	(Argentina) Nicolás Cavigliasso	(Argentina) Valen Pertegarini	Taurus EVO Max	Vertical Motorsport	T3.1
301	(Saudi Arabia) Dania Akeel	(France) Sébastien Delaunay	Taurus T3 Max	BBR Motorsport	T3.1
302	(Netherlands) Puck Klaassen	(Argentina) Augusto Sanz	GRallyteam G-Ecko	KTM X-bow Powered by G Rally Team	T3.1
303	(Netherlands) Kees Koolen	(Netherlands) Jurgen van den Goorbergh	GRallyteam G-Ecko	G Rally Team	T3.1
304	(Saudi Arabia) Yasir Seaidan	(France) Xavier Flick	Taurus EVO Max	Nasser Racing Team	T3.1
305	(Argentina) David Zille	(Argentina) Sebastian Cesana	Taurus T3 Max	BBR Motorsport	T3.1
306	(Portugal) Pedro Goncalves	(Portugal) Hugo Magalhaes	Taurus T3 Max	BBR Motorsport	T3.1
308	(France) Alexandre Giroud	(France) Armelle Henry	Taurus T3 Max	Rebellion - Spierings	T3.1
310	(Netherlands) Paul Spierings	(Netherlands) Jan Pieter van der Stelt	Taurus EVO Max	Rebellion - Spierings	T3.1
311	(France) Aurélien Bouchet	(France) Elisa Huguenin	PH-Sport Zephyr Phase 2	Abconcept / Btr	T3.1
313	(United Arab Emirates) Khalid Aljafla	(Lithuania) Andrey Rudnitski	Taurus T3 Max	Aljafla Racing	T3.1
314	(Chile) Ignacio Casale	(Brazil) Carlos Sachs	Taurus T3 Max	BBR Motorsport	T3.1
315	(France) Jedidia Favre	(France) Antoine Lecourbe	MMP T3 Rally Raid	Mmp by Tmtp	T3.1
316	(Qatar) Abzulaziz Al-Kuwari	(France) Stéphane Duple	Taurus EVO Max	Qmmf Team	T3.1
317	(Spain) Oscar Ral	(Argentina) Fernando Acosta	Taurus EVO Max	Vertical Motorsport	T3.1
319	(France) Hervé Guillaume	(France) Maxime Guillaume	PH-Sport Zephyr Phase 2	Btr-proparc	T3.1
320	(France) Benjamin Favre	(France) Thibaud Darroux	MMP T3 Rally Raid	Mmp by Tmtp	T3.1
321	(Portugal) Rui Carneiro	(Portugal) Fausto Mota	MMP T3 Rally Raid	G Rally Team	T3.1
323	(Netherlands) Pim Klaassen	(Netherlands) Mark Laan	Taurus EVO Max	Daklapack Rallysport	T3.1
324	(Netherlands) Riné Streppel	(Netherlands) Lisette Bakker	Arcane T3	Arcane Racing	T3.1
325	(Poland) Piotr Beaupre	(Poland) Jarosław Kazberuk	BRP Can-Am Maverick	Zoll Racing	T3.1
326	(Poland) Lukasz Zoll	(Poland) Michal Zoll	BRP Can-Am Maverick	Zoll Racing	T3.1
327	(Netherlands) Henri van Steenbergen	(Netherlands) Daan van Ooijen	GPR Oryxrallysport GPR	Oryxrallysport	T3.1
328	(France) Bruno Saby	(France) Benjamin Boulloud	Taurus EVO Max	Rebellion - Spierings	T3.1
329	(Netherlands) Daniel Kersbergen	(Belgium) Michiel Goegebeur	GPR Orangebull GPR	Orange Bull	T3.1
330	(Netherlands) Lex Peters	(Netherlands) Mark Salomons	GRallyteam G-Ecko	G Rally Team	T3.1
331	Sergei Remennik (Note: Sergei Remennik is Russian, but he competes as a neutral competitor using the ANA flag as Russian national emblems were banned by the FIA due to the Russian invasion of Ukraine.)	Aleksei Ignatov (Note: Aleksei Ignatov is Russian, but he competes as a neutral competitor using the ANA flag as Russian national emblems were banned by the FIA due to the Russian invasion of Ukraine.)	Taurus T3 Max	BBR Motorsport	T3.1
332	(Austria) Vic Flip	(Germany) Stefan Henken	BRP Can-Am Maverick R	Mm Rallye	T3.1
333	(Spain) Joan Font	(Spain) Adriá Guillem	BRP Can-Am Maverick X3	Be Racing	T3.1
334	(Netherlands) Dick van Culenborg	(Netherlands) Mark Klinkhamer	Taurus T3 Max	Rebellion - Spierings	T3.1
335	(Luxembourg) Charles Munster	(France) Xavier Panseri	GRallyteam G-Ecko	KTM X-bow Powered by G Rally Team	T3.1
336	(Spain) Pau Navarro	(Spain) Jan Rosa	Taurus T3 Max	BBR Motorsport	T3.1
338	(Chile) Lucas del Rio	(Argentina) Bruno Jacomy	Taurus T3 Max	BBR Motorsport	T3.1
340	(Italy) Rebecca Busi	(Uruguay) Sergio Lafuente	X-raid Fenic	X-raid	T3.1
347	(Argentina) Kevin Benavides	(Argentina) Lisandro Sisterna	Taurus T3 Max	BBR Motorsport	T3.1
348	(France) Kevin Rouviere	(France) Patrick Jimbert	BRP Can-Am Maverick X3 XRS Turbo RR	Kr Competition by Sergio	T3.1
351	(Switzerland) Alexandre Pesci	(Switzerland) Stephan Kuhni	Taurus EVO Max	Rebellion - Spierings	T3.1
363	(United States) Pablo Copetti	(Brazil) Enio Bozzano	MMP T3 Rally-Raid	Mmp	T3.1

Entry list – SSV (T4)

Note
– The "Dakar Legends" – competitors that participated in 10 or more Dakar events.
– The first time starters – "rookies".
– Competitors that were not able to start the race.

No.	Driver	Navigator	Vehicle	Team	Group
400	(Portugal) Alexandre Pinto	(Portugal) Bernardo Oliveira	Polaris RZR Pro R Sport	Old Friends Rally Team	T4
401	(United States) Brock Heger	(United States) Max Eddy	Polaris RZR Pro R	Loeb Fraymedia Motorsport - Rzr Factory Racing	SSV1
402	(Chile) Francisco López Contardo	(Chile) Álvaro Leon	BRP Can-Am Maverick R	Can-am Factory Team	SSV1
403	(Ecuador) Sebastian Guayasamin	(Spain) Pol Ros Vidiella	Polaris RZR Pro R Sport	Old Friends Rally Team	T4
404	(Portugal) Gonçalo Guerreiro	(Brazil) Maykel Justo	Polaris RZR Pro R	Loeb Fraymedia Motorsport - Rzr Factory Racing	SSV1
405	(Argentina) Manuel Andújar	(Argentina) Andres Frini	BRP Can-Am Maverick R	South Racing Can-am	SSV1
406	(Argentina) Jeremías Gonzalez Ferioli	(Argentina) Gonzalo Rinaldi	BRP Can-Am Maverick R	Can-am Factory Team	SSV1
407	(France) Xavier de Soultrait	(France) Martin Bonnet	Polaris RZR Pro R	Loeb Fraymedia Motorsport - Rzr Factory Racing	SSV1
408	(Portugal) Joao Monteiro	(Portugal) Nuno Morais	BRP Can-Am Maverick R	Can-am Factory Team	SSV1
410	(United States) Hunter Miller	(United States) Jeremy Gray	BRP Can-Am Maverick R	Can-am Factory Team	SSV1
412	(France) Florent Vayssade	(France) Nicolas Rey	Polaris RZR Pro R	Loeb Fraymedia Motorsport - Rzr Factory Racing	T4
414	(Saudi Arabia) Saleh Al Saif	(Lithuania) Albert Veliamovic	BRP Can-Am Maverick X3 XRS Turbo RR	Dark Horse Team	T4
415	(Spain) Gerard Farrés	(Spain) Tony Vingut	BRP Can-Am Maverick X3 XRS Turbo RR	Pedrega Team	T4
416	(United States) Kyle Chaney	(United States) Jacob Argubright	BRP Can-Am Maverick R	Can-am Factory Team	SSV1
417	(Portugal) Helder Rodrigues	(Portugal) Gonçalo Reis	Polaris RZR Pro R Sport	Santag Racing	T4
418	(France) Benoît Lepietre	(France) Peter Serra	BRP Can-Am Maverick R	Btr	SSV1
419	(France) Olivier Pernaut	(France) Benjamin Riviere	BRP Can-Am Maverick R	Orhes Racing	SSV1
420	(Sweden) Johan Kristoffersson	(Norway) Ola Fløene	Polaris RZR Pro R	Loeb Fraymedia Motorsport - Rzr Factory Racing	T4
421	(France) Philippe Boutron	(France) Mayeul Barbet	BRP Can-Am Maverick R	Btr	SSV1
422	(Spain) Carlos Santaolalla	(Spain) Aran Sol	BRP Can-Am Maverick X3 XRS Turbo RR	Pedrega Team	T4
423	(Spain) Domingo Roman	(Spain) Oscar Bravo	Polaris RZR Pro R Sport	Th-trucks Team	T4
424	(Portugal) Joao Dias	(Portugal) Daniel Jordao	Polaris RZR Pro R Sport	Santag Racing	T4
425	(Spain) Joan Piferrer	(Spain) Xavier Blanco	BRP Can-Am Maverick R	Buggy Masters Team	SSV1
426	(France) Heathcliff Zingraf	(France) Eric Bersey	BRP Can-Am Maverick X3 XRS Turbo RR	Team Casteu Trophy	T4
427	(Lithuania) Mindaugas Sidabras	(Lithuania) Ernestas Česokas	BRP Can-Am Maverick R	Izoton Sport	SSV1
428	(Poland) Maciej Oleksowicz	(Poland) Marcin Sienkiewicz	BRP Can-Am Maverick R	South Racing Can-am	SSV1
429	(Kazakhstan) Denis Berezovskiy	(Lithuania) Artur Ardavichus	BRP Can-Am Maverick R	South Racing Can-am	SSV1
430	(France) Adrien Choblet	(France) Laurent Magat	BRP Can-Am Maverick X3 XRS Turbo RR	Team Casteu Trophy	T4
431	(Spain) José María Cami	(Spain) Cristian Cami	BRP Can-Am Maverick R	Buggy Masters Team	SSV1
432	(United Kingdom) Richard Aczel	(Netherlands) Wouter Rosegaar	BRP Can-Am Maverick R	South Racing Can-am	SSV1
433	(Saudi Arabia) Hassan Jameel	(Poland) Maciej Giemza	BRP Can-Am Maverick R	South Racing Can-am	SSV1
434	(Saudi Arabia) Abdullah Al Shegawi	(Saudi Arabia) Raed Alassaf	BRP Can-Am Maverick X3 XRS Turbo RR	Be Racing	T4
435	(Saudi Arabia) Hamzah Bakhashab	(Saudi Arabia) Fahad Alamr	BRP Can-Am Maverick X3 XRS Turbo RR	Be Racing	T4
436	(France) David Casteu	(France) François Bonnet	BRP Can-Am Maverick X3 XRS Turbo RR	Team Casteu Trophy	T4
437	(New Zealand) Robert Knight	Aleksey Kuzmich	BRP Can-Am Maverick R	R-x Sport	SSV1
438	(Portugal) Bruno Martins	(Portugal) Eurico Adão	Polaris RZR Pro R Sport	Santag Racing	T4
439	(France) Gauthier Honvault	(France) Delphine Delfino	BRP Can-Am Maverick R	Solurent	SSV1
440	(Angola) Rui Silva	(Angola) Francisco Albuquerque	Polaris RZR Pro R Sport	Th-trucks Team	T4
441	(United States) Lawrence Janesky	(South Africa) Dennis Murphy	BRP Can-Am Maverick R	South Racing Can-am	SSV1
442	(Saudi Arabia) Hamad N. Alharbi	(United Arab Emirates) Ali Mirza	BRP Can-Am Maverick X3 XRS Turbo RR	Shegawi Racing	T4
443	(Saudi Arabia) Abdullah Al-Fahad	(South Africa) Leander Pienaar	BRP Can-Am Maverick X3 XRS Turbo RR	Dark Horse Team	T4

Entry list – Trucks

Note
– The "Dakar Legends" – competitors that participated in 10 or more Dakar events.
– The first time starters – "rookies".
– Competitors that were not able to start the race.

No.	Driver	Navigator	Mechanic	Vehicle	Team	Group
600	(Czech Republic) Martin Macík	(Czech Republic) Frantisek Tomasek	(Czech Republic) David Svanda	MM Technology Iveco Dakar EVO4	MM Technology	T5.1
601	(Netherlands) Mitchel van den Brink	(Netherlands) Bart van Heun	(Netherlands) Jarno van de Pol	Iveco PowerStar	Eurol Rallysport	T5.1
602	(Czech Republic) Aleš Loprais	(Czech Republic) David Kripal	(Czech Republic) Jiri Stross	Iveco Powerstar	Loprais Team De Rooy Fpt	T5.1
603	(Czech Republic) Martin Soltys	(Czech Republic) Vlastimil Miksch	(Czech Republic) Tomas Sikola	Tatra Buggyra EVO 3	Tatra Buggyra Zm Racing	T5.1
604	(Lithuania) Vaidotas Žala	(Portugal) Paulo Fiuza	(Netherlands) Max van Grol	Iveco Powerstar	Nørdis Team De Rooy Fpt	T5.1
606	(Netherlands) Martin van den Brink	(Netherlands) Rijk Mouw	(Belgium) Peter Willemsen	Iveco Powerstar	Eurol Rallysport	T5.1
607	(Netherlands) Richard de Groot	(Netherlands) Martijn van Rooij	(Netherlands) Jan Hulsebosch	Iveco Powerstar	Firemen Rally Team	T5.1
608	(Japan) Teruhito Sugawara	(Japan) Hirokazu Somemiya	(Japan) Yuji Mochizuki	Hino 600	Hino Team Sugawara	T5.1
609	(Netherlands) Gert Huzink	(Netherlands) Hugo Kupper	(Germany) Mario Kress	Renault C460 EVO 4	Kuipers Jongbloed Hybrid	T5.1
610	(Italy) Claudio Bellina	(Italy) Bruno Gotti	(Italy) Marco Arnoletti	MM Technology Iveco Dakar EVO4	MM Technology	T5.1
611	(Netherlands) Ben de Groot	(Netherlands) Ad Hofmans	(Netherlands) Govert Boogaard	Iveco Powerstar	De Groot Sport	T5.1
612	(Netherlands) William de Groot	(Netherlands) Koen Hendriks	(Netherlands) Remon van der Steen	Iveco Powerstar	De Groot Sport	T5.1
614	(Czech Republic) Michal Valtr	(Czech Republic) Lukas Kvasnica	(Czech Republic) Radim Kaplanek	Iveco Powerstar	Valtr Racing Team	T5.1
615	(Czech Republic) Karel Posledni	(Czech Republic) Petr Schweiner	(Czech Republic) Filip Skrobanek	Tatra Buggyra EVO 3	Tatra Buggyra Zm Racing	T5.1
616	(Netherlands) Kay Huzink	(Netherlands) Rob Buursen	(Netherlands) Gerrit Schoneveld	Renault C460	Kuipers Jongbloed Hybrid	T5.1
617	(Netherlands) Egbert Wingens	(Netherlands) Marije Wingens-van Ettekoven	(Netherlands) Marijn Beekmans	Iveco Torpedo	Ddw Rallyteam	T5.1
618	(Spain) Manuel Borrero	(Belgium) Charly Gotlib	(Spain) Adrian Lopez	Iveco Magirus	The Dacia Sandriders	T5.1
619	(France) Jean-François Cazeres	(France) Nicolas Falloux	(France) Jérôme Detouillon	Iveco Trakker	Boucou Competition	T5.2
620	(Netherlands) Marnix Leeuw	(Netherlands) Marco Siemons	(Netherlands) Bert van Donkelaar	Iveco Powerstar	Leeuw Rallysport	T5.1
621	(Poland) Darek Lysek	(Poland) Jacek Czachor	(Poland) Darek Rodewald	MM Technology Iveco Dakar EVO4	Hurtimo White Reds Racing Team	T5.1
623	(Spain) Alberto Herrero	(Mozambique) Paulo Oliveira	(Spain) Mario Rodriguez	Scania Torpedo	TH-trucks Team	T5.2
624	(Saudi Arabia) Tariq Al-Rammah	(France) Samir Benbekhti	(France) Serge Lambert	Volvo FMX	Sta Competition	T5.2
625	(Hungary) Zsolt Darazsi	(France) Pierre Calmon	(Slovakia) Palco Lubomir	MAN TGA	Team Ssp	T5.2
626	(Belgium) Dave Ingels	(Netherlands) Johannes Schotanus	(Spain) David Lopez	MAN TGA	SVR	T5.2
628	(Germany) Mathias Behringer	(Germany) Michael Helminger	(Germany) Philipp Rettig	MAN TGE	Motorsport Behringer	T5.2
629	(Czech Republic) Tomas Tomecek	(Slovakia) Tomas Kazarka	(South Africa) Grant Ballington	Tatra 815-2	South Racing Can-am	T5.2
630	(Spain) Pol Tibau	(Spain) David Nadal	(Spain) Daniel Vaz	Iveco Powerstar	Tibau Rally Assistance	T5.2
631	(Belgium) Dave Berghmans	(United Kingdom) Sam Koopmann	(Belgium) Peter Ulenaers	Iveco Trakker	Overdrive Racing	T5.2
632	(France) Richard Gonzalez	(France) Franck Maldonado	(France) Jean-Philippe Salviat	Iveco Other	Sodicars Racing	T5.2
633	(Germany) Udo Kuhn	(France) Vincent Ferri	(France) Joël Sarron	MAN TGS	Sta Competition	T5.2
634	(Spain) Francisco Ester	(Spain) Gerard Ribas	(Spain) Javier Jacoste	MAN TGA	Buggy Masters Team	T5.2
635	(France) Sylvain Besnard	(France) Sylvain Laliche	(France) Patrick Prot	MAN TGA	Ric Rally	T5.2
636	(Belgium) Didier Monseu	(Belgium) Olivier Jacmart	(Belgium) Nicolas Vandommele	MAN TGA	The Dacia Sandriders	T5.2
637	(Spain) Jesus Borrero Gomez	(Spain) Emilio Fiz	(Spain) Alberto Fiz	MAN TGS	Tibau Team	T5.2
638	(Czech Republic) Dusan Randysek	(France) Laurent Lalanne	(France) Victor Bouchwalder	MAN TGA	Team Ssp	T5.2
639	(Spain) Alberto Alonso	(Spain) Gustavo Ibeas	(Spain) Raul Arteaga	MAN TGA	TH-trucks Team	T5.2
640	(France) Alexandre Lemeray	(France) Anthony Robineau	(France) Fabien Lecaplain	DAF XF	Team Nrs	T5.2
643	(France) Jérémie Gimbre	(France) Téo Calvet	(France) Didier Belivier	DAF CF85	Sodicars Racing	T5.2
644	(Spain) Maria Helena Tarruell	(Spain) Jaqueline Ricci	(Spain) Arantxa Marti	Iveco Powerstar	Tibau Team	T5.2
645	(France) Sébastien Fargeas	(France) Jérémie Demarty	(France) Christophe Delaval	MAN TGA	Boucou Competition	T5.2
646	(France) Antoine Vitse	(France) Alain Coquelle	(France) Damien Cousin	Scania Torpedo	Team Solurent	T5.2
647	(France) Philippe Perry	(France) Philipp Beier	(France) Florent Drulhon	MAN TGA	Boucou Competition	T5.2
648	(Spain) Jordi Esteve	(Spain) Quico Pardo	(Spain) Jordi Pujol	DAF FAV85	Tibau Team	T5.2
649	(Spain) Javier Herrero	(Spain) Alfonso Herrero	(Spain) Jose Maria Casas	Iveco Tector 260 E25	TH-trucks Team	T5.2
650	(Saudi Arabia) Bader Albarrak	(France) Marco Piana	(France) Paco Fernandez	Mercedes Unimog	4X4	T5.2
651	(France) Ahmed Benbekhti	(France) Mickael Fauvel	(France) Bruno Seillet	MAN TGA	Rebellion - Spierings	T5.2

Entry list – Classics

Note
– The "Dakar Legends" – competitors that participated in 10 or more Dakar events.
– The first time starters – "rookies".
– Competitors that were not able to start the race.

No.	Driver	Navigator	Mechanic	Vehicle	Team	Class
701	(Italy) Lorenzo Traglio	(Italy) Rudy Briani	No technician	Nissan Pick Up	Tecnosport	86-98 Low Average
702	(Spain) Juan Morera	(Spain) Lidia Ruba	No technician	Porsche 959 Dakar	Momabikes Raid Team	-86 Moderate Average
703	(Lithuania) Karolis Raišys	(France) Christophe Marques	No technician	Land Rover Defender	Ovoko Racing	-86 Low Average
704	(Poland) Tomasz Staniszewski	(Poland) Stanisław Postawka	No technician	Porsche 924	P-Rally Team	-86 Low Average
705	(Italy) Marco Ernesto Leva	(Italy) Alexia Giugni	No technician	Mitsubishi Pajero	R Team	-86 Low Average
706	(Colombia) Javier Velez	(Argentina) Gastón Mattarucco	No technician	Toyota Land Cruiser	Be Racing	99-05 Intermediate Average
707	(Spain) Jordi Segura	(Spain) Enric Segura	No technician	Porsche Cayenne	Be Racing	99-05 Intermediate Average
708	(Germany) Jörg Sand	(Netherlands) Onno den Boer	No technician	Mercedes Classe G	Völkel Rally Team	-86 Low Average
709	(Italy) Paolo Bedeschi	(Italy) Iader Giraldi	No technician	Toyota J8	Tecnosport	86-98 Low Average
710	(Czech Republic) Ondrej Klymciw	(Czech Republic) Josef Broz	No technician	Mitsubishi Pajero	Klymciw Racing	86-98 Low Average
712	(Spain) Rafael Lesmes	(Spain) Tabatha Romon	No technician	Toyota HDJ 80	TH-Trucks Team	-86 Moderate Average
714	(France) Nicolas Fantin	(France) Lucien Fantin	No technician	Lada Niva	Pom Family Racing	-86 Low Average
717	(Switzerland) Mathieu Kurzen	(France) Sébastien Dubois	No technician	Nissan Terrano	K Motorsport	86-98 Moderate Average
718	(France) François Abrial	(France) Sébastien Baronnet	No technician	BMW 325 IX	Team SSP	-86 Moderate Average
719	(Italy) Luciano Carcheri	(Italy) Fabrizia Pons	No technician	Isuzu Vehicross	Team Classic Carcheri/Pons	-86 Low Average
720	(Croatia) Juraj Šebalj	(Croatia) Dušan Bućan	No technician	Toyota HDJ 80	Timeout Racing	99-05 Moderate Average
721	(Italy) Gian Paolo Cavagna	(Italy) Francesco Proietti	No technician	Nissan Patrol	Tecnosport	99-05 Moderate Average
722	(India) Sanjay Takale	(France) Maxime Raud	No technician	Toyota HDJ 100	Compagnie Saharienne	86-98 Intermediate Average
723	(Italy) Francesco Pece	(Italy) Simona Morosi	No technician	Nissan Terrano	Tecnosport	86-98 Low Average
724	(Italy) Renato Rickler Del Mare	(Italy) Massimo Gabbrielleschi	No technician	Mitsubishi Pajero	R Team	86-98 Moderate Average
725	(France) Jean-Noël Gaviot Doguillon	(France) Yvon Baud	No technician	Porsche 911	Team Popeye 2b Autosport	-86 Intermediate Average
726	(United States) Taz Harvey	(Italy) Rocco Sbaraglia	No technician	Nissan Terrano	Tecnosport	86-98 Low Average
727	(Austria) Peter Brabeck-Letmathe	(France) Jean-Michel Gayte	No technician	Mitsubishi Pajero	Team Casteu	86-98 Moderate Average
728	(France) Maxence Gublin	(France) Anthony Sousa	No technician	Land Rover Defender	Bolides Racing Team	-86 Low Average
729	(Canada) David Bensadoun	(Mexico) Nicolas Ambriz	No technician	Toyota HDJ 100	Boucou Competition	86-98 Intermediate Average
730	(Canada) Douglas Bensadoun	(Canada) Zeki Cengiz Tanc	No technician	Toyota HDJ 100	Boucou Competition	99-05 Intermediate Average
731	(Italy) Josef Unterholzner	(Italy) Franco Gaioni	No technician	Mitsubishi Pajero	R Team	86-98 Moderate Average
732	(France) Herve Solandt	(France) Laurent Milbergue	No technician	Range Rover Classic	Team SSP	-86 Low Average
735	(France) Gabriel Valentin	(France) Brice Laborie-Brondino	No technician	Range Rover Classic	Team DB-Vio	-86 Moderate Average
736	(France) Gérard Mattiussi	(France) Serge Dumas	No technician	Range Rover Classic	Team SSP	86-98 Low Average
737	(United Kingdom) Helen Tait Wright	(United Kingdom) Marcella Kirk	No technician	Land Rover 110	Gazelles Offroad Team	86-98 Moderate Average
738	(Italy) Alessandro De Meo	(Italy) Claudio Pelizzeni	No technician	Mitsubishi Pajero	R Team	-86 Low Average
739	(United Kingdom) Philip Pryor	(United Kingdom) David Nicholas Steer	No technician	Toyota BJ 70	TH-Trucks Team	-86 Moderate Average
741	(Switzerland) Daniel Vetter	(Switzerland) Anton Frutiger	No technician	Toyota HDJ 100	Team Desert Cruiser	99-05 Moderate Average
742	(France) Christophe Chabeuf	(Switzerland) Thierry Fresard	No technician	Toyota HZJ 75	Team SSP	-86 Moderate Average
743	(France) Sophie Bié	(France) Christine Bernard	No technician	Toyota HDJ 100	Team SSP	-86 Moderate Average
744	(Switzerland) Stephane Gutzwiller	(Belgium) Hilde de Sutter	No technician	Toyota HDJ 80	Team SSP	-86 Moderate Average
745	(Spain) Raul Pascual	(Spain) Marco Antonio Cabrera	No technician	Toyota KZJ 95	Pedrega Team	86-98 Moderate Average
746	(France) Fabrice Morin	(France) Magalie Morin	No technician	Toyota HDJ 100	Ydeo Competition	99-05 Intermediate Average
747	(Luxembourg) Maxime Lorenzini	(Luxembourg) Daniel Lorenzini	No technician	Toyota HDJ 80	Vintage Rally Terville	86-98 Moderate Average
748	(France) Sébastien Coran	(France) Thierry Emond	No technician	Toyota HDJ 80	Vintage Rally Terville	86-98 Moderate Average
749	(Italy) Damiano Lipani	(Italy) Dominella Maverik	No technician	Mitsubishi Evolution	R Team	86-98 Moderate Average
750	(Hungary) Roland Gaál	(Hungary) Mihály Eigner	No technician	Mitsubishi Pajero	Tireman Classic Racing	86-98 Low Average
751	(Italy) Henry Favre	(Italy) Alessandro Iacovelli	No technician	Mitsubishi Pajero	R Team	86-98 Moderate Average
752	(France) Yann Thebault	(France) Frédéric Murat	No technician	Toyota KZJ 95	Pedrega Team	86-98 Moderate Average
753	(Italy) Giuliano Bergo	(Italy) Francesca Gasperi	No technician	Mitsubishi Evolution	R Team	86-98 Moderate Average
754	(Italy) Filippo Colnaghi	(Italy) Irene Saderini	No technician	Nissan Patrol	Tecnosport	86-98 Low Average
755	(France) Alain Maria	(France) Vincent Brotons	No technician	Toyota HDJ 80	Team SSP	-86 Moderate Average
756	(United Kingdom) Daniel Matthew Pycock	(Spain) Francisco Javier Gomez Espigares	No technician	Mitsubishi Montero	Pedrega Team	86-98 Moderate Average
757	(Luxembourg) Lucas Grilli	(Luxembourg) Bruno Grilli	No technician	Toyota HDJ 80	Vintage Rally Terville	86-98 Moderate Average
758	(Italy) Michele Bini	(Italy) Daniele Manoni	No technician	Mitsubishi L200	R Team	86-98 Moderate Average
759	(France) Hervé Diers	(France) Alain Brousse	No technician	Toyota HZJ 78	Chtifriterie Secours Populaire Rfo	86-98 Moderate Average
760	(France) Stephan Lamarre	(France) Alexandre Laroche	No technician	Bowler Wildcat	Team Elite	99-05 Moderate Average
761	(United States) Kim Matzen	(United States) Chris Kelly	No technician	Toyota HZJ 78	Compagnie Saharienne	86-98 Low Average
762	(France) Michael Vandewoestyne	(France) Simon Roy	No technician	Toyota HJ 61	Chtifriterie Secours Populaire Rfo	86-98 Moderate Average
763	(Germany) Maximilian Loder	(Germany) Laurence Loder	No technician	Puch 280GE	Delta4x4	-86 Low Average
764	(Poland) Pawel Kosminski	(Poland) Bartosz Balicki	No technician	Mercedes Classe G	Völkel Rally Team	-86 Low Average
765	(Germany) Ulrich Schmidt	(Germany) Brigitte Reitbauer	No technician	Mercedes Classe G	Völkel Rally Team	-86 Low Average
766	(Indonesia) Shammie Baridwan	(Lithuania) Ignas Daunoravičius	No technician	Toyota HZJ 78	Compagnie Saharienne	86-98 Low Average
767	(Czech Republic) Jan Vins	(Czech Republic) Jiri Kopriva	No technician	Mitsubishi Pajero	Gold Motorsport Cz	-86 Moderate Average
768	(Czech Republic) Kateřina Vánová	(Czech Republic) Petr Vána	No technician	Toyota 4Runner	Gold Motorsport Cz	-86 Low Average
769	(Portugal) Luis Antonio Pires	(Spain) Mateu Riera Abellan	No technician	Mitsubishi Pajero	LJS Racing Team	86-98 Intermediate Average
770	(Spain) Raúl Ortiz Correa	(Spain) Raúl Ortiz Navas	No technician	Toyota RAV 4	Pedrega Team	86-98 Moderate Average
771	(France) Thierry Campos	(France) Laurent Campos	No technician	Renault R18	La Camposienne	-86 Low Average
773	(Indonesia) Julian Johan	(France) Mathieu Monplaisi	No technician	Toyota HDJ 100	Compagnie Saharienne	86-98 Intermediate Average
774	(France) Stéphane Debair	(France) Jean Bernard Matouillot	No technician	Isuzu D-Max	Bolides Racing Team	99-05 Intermediate Average
775	(Italy) Davide Facchini	(Italy) Francesco Minghetti	No technician	Mitsubishi Evolution	R Team	99-05 Intermediate Average
776	(Spain) José Sole	(Spain) Sergio Cerezo	No technician	Mitsubishi Montero	TH-Trucks Team	-86 Moderate Average
777	(Spain) Lorenzo Fluxa	(Spain) Sergi Fernandez	No technician	Toyota KZJ 90	LJS Racing Team	86-98 Moderate Average
778	(Switzerland) Sladjan Miljic	(Germany) Marcel Adelmann	No technician	Lada Niva	Oasis Rally Team	86-98 Moderate Average
779	(Hungary) Szabolcs Balazs	(Hungary) Laszlo Tempfli	No technician	Mitsubishi Pajero	DD	86-98 Low Average
780	(Poland) Mariusz Pietrzycki	(Poland) Kamil Jablonski	No technician	Toyota HDJ 80	Podroze4x4.pl Rally Team	86-98 Moderate Average
781	(Italy) Lorenzo Delladio	(Italy) Guido Guerrini	No technician	Porsche 959 Dakar	Sikkens Motorsport - Rteam	86-98 Moderate Average
782	(Italy) Paolo Fellin	(Italy) Werner Gramm	No technician	Porsche 959 Dakar	Sikkens Motorsport - Rteam	86-98 Moderate Average
797	(Italy) Francesco Valente	(Italy) Vichi Carlevaris	No technician	Mercedes Classe G	Team Desert Crows	99-05 Moderate Average
900	(Portugal) Joao Antonio do Coito Lota	(Angola) Nuno Miguel Bismarque dos Santos	(Spain) Albert Casabona Vilaseca	Mercedes 2636 A	TH-Trucks Team	-86 Low Average
901	(Czech Republic) Martin Stopa	(Czech Republic) Lubomir Dockal	(Czech Republic) Martin Horak	Tatra T815	Loprais Team	-86 Moderate Average
902	(Poland) Tomasz Białkowski	(Poland) Dariusz Baskiewicz	(Poland) Adam Grodzki	DAF Bull	Team De Rooy	-86 Moderate Average
903	(Italy) Giuseppe Francesco Simonato	(France) Wade Syndiely	(Italy) Alexander Sorbelli	Iveco 190	Gealife Motorsport	86-98 Low Average
905	(Saudi Arabia) Ibrahim Al Muhna	(Saudi Arabia) Faisal Alsuwayh	(Saudi Arabia) Raed Abo Theeb	Mercedes Unimog	Almuhanna Racing	86-98 Moderate Average
907	(France) Jérôme Pélichet	(France) Michel Charret	(France) Ludovic Ecochard	Mercedes 1935 AK	Raid Lynx	86-98 Moderate Average
908	(Italy) Marino Mutti	(Italy) Angelo Fumagalli		Mercedes Unimog	Tecnosport	99-05 Low Average
909	(France) Olivier Guillory	(France) Reynald Prive	(France) Jean Pascal Petrelli	MAN F90	Bolides Racing Team	99-05 Low Average
910	(France) Dorian Bardeau	(Spain) Lourdes Puigmal	(France) Franck Puchouau	Renault Kerax	Boucou Competition	99-05 Low Average
911	(France) Michael Devillers	(France) David Lhermelin	(France) Marc Houllemare	Mercedes 1936 AK	Team NRS	86-98 Moderate Average
912	(Italy) Andrea Cadei	(Italy) Marco Valentini	(Italy) Stefano Sbrana	Fiat 80 16	Tecnosport	-86 Low Average
913	(Spain) Jaime Martinez	(Spain) Nekane Abin	(Spain) Iker Extebarria	Mercedes 1936 AK	R Team	-86 Low Average
914	(Italy) Giorgio Porello	(Italy) Simone Casadei	(Italy) Gianluca Capelli	Iveco Magirus	Gealife Motorsport	86-98 Low Average
915	(France) Jean Baptiste Lecot	(France) Johann Valognes	(France) Pierre-Yves James	MAN F90	Team NRS	-86 Moderate Average
917	(Italy) Andrea Pozzetti	(Italy) Enea Martino Corna	(Italy) Luca Macrini	Iveco Eurocargo	R Team	86-98 Low Average
918	(Germany) Robert Thiele	(Germany) Jan Holtz	(Germany) Daniel Schatz	Mercedes 2636	Völkel Rally Team	-86 Low Average
919	(Germany) Stefan Gehrmann	(Germany) Sebastian Gatz		Mercedes 1735 AK	Sg Racing Nordheide	86-98 Low Average
920	(Spain) José Manuel Salinero	(Spain) Javier Huete Benito	(Spain) Sergio Molina Blanco	Mercedes 2644	Guardia Civil Rally Raid 25a	86-98 Low Average
921	(France) Jean-Philippe Beziat	(France) Vincent Albira	(France) Jérémy Athimon	Mercedes 1935 AK	Team SSP	-86 Low Average
922	(France) Vivien Bertrand	(France) Jerome Thiry	(France) Jean-Pierre Grangeon	DAF 4X4	Boucou Competition	86-98 Low Average
923	(Germany) Alexander Schmidt	(Switzerland) Daniel Lortscher	(Germany) Jan Dippel	Mercedes 2636	Völkel Rally Team	-86 Low Average
924	(Italy) Rachele Somaschini	(Italy) Monica Buonamano	(Italy) Serena Rodella	Mercedes Unimog	Tecnosport	86-98 Low Average

Entry list – Mission 1000

Note
– The "Dakar Legends" – competitors that participated in 10 or more Dakar events.
– The first time starters – "rookies".
– Competitors that were not able to start the race.

No.	Driver/rider	Navigator	Mechanic	Vehicle	Team	Class
1000	(Argentina) Benjamín Pascual	No co-driver	No technician	Segway	Segway Team	M1000 - Bike
1001	(China) Jie Yang	No co-driver	No technician	Segway	Segway Team	M1000 - Bike
1002	(China) Yi Guanghui	No co-driver	No technician	Segway	Segway Team	M1000 - Bike
1004	(Spain) Miguel Puertas	No co-driver	No technician	Arctic Leopard EXE 880 Rally	Arctic Leopard Galicia Team	M1000 - Bike
1005	(Spain) Esther Merino	No co-driver	No technician	Arctic Leopard EXE 880 Rally	Arctic Leopard Galicia Team	M1000 - Bike
1006	(Spain) Fran Gómez Pallas	No co-driver	No technician	Arctic Leopard EXE 880 Rally	Arctic Leopard Galicia Team	M1000 - Bike
1040	(Spain) Jordi Juvanteny	(Spain) José Luis Criado	(Spain) Xavier Ribas	MAN TGA	KH7-Ecovergy	M1000 - Truck

== Stages ==
Stage	Date		Start	Finish	Special (km)		Total (km)		Assistance (km)
Stage	Date		Start	Finish	FIM	FIA	FIM	FIA	Assistance (km)
Prologue	Saturday	3 January 2026	Yanbu	Yanbu	23		98		-
1	Sunday	4 January 2026	Yanbu	Yanbu	305		518		367
2	Monday	5 January 2026	Yanbu	Al-Ula	400		504		-
3	Tuesday	6 January 2026	Al-Ula	Al-Ula	422		666		-
4 (Marathon)	Wednesday	7 January 2026	Al-Ula	Bivouac Refuge	417	451	492	526	-
5 (Marathon)	Thursday	8 January 2026	Bivouac Refuge	Ha'il	356	372	417	428	448
6	Friday	9 January 2026	Ha'il	Riyadh	331		920		-
Rest Day	Saturday	10 January 2026	Riyadh		-				
7	Sunday	11 January 2026	Riyadh	Wadi ad-Dawasir	462		876		623
8	Monday	12 January 2026	Wadi ad-Dawasir	Wadi ad-Dawasir	481		717		-
9	Tuesday	13 January 2026	Wadi ad-Dawasir	Bivouac Refuge	418	410	540	531	-
10	Wednesday	14 January 2026	Bivouac Refuge	Bisha	371	421	417	469	358
11	Thursday	15 January 2026	Bisha	Al Henakiyah	347		882		777
12	Friday	16 January 2026	Al Henakiyah	Yanbu	310		718		362
13	Saturday	17 January 2026	Yanbu	Yanbu	105		141		-
Total					4,748	4,840	7,906	7,994	3,562

== Stage winners ==
Stage	Bikes	Cars	Stock	Challenger (T3)	SSV (T4)	Trucks	Classics	Mission 1000
Prologue	(Spain) Edgar Canet	(Sweden) Mattias Ekström	(United States) Sara Price	(Netherlands) Paul Spierings	(United States) Brock Heger	(Netherlands) Mitchel van den Brink	(Italy) Francesco Pece	(Argentina) Benjamin Pascual
Stage 1	(Spain) Edgar Canet	(Belgium) Guillaume De Mévius	(Lithuania) Rokas Baciuška	(Argentina) David Zille	(France) Xavier de Soultrait	(Czech Republic) Aleš Loprais	(Italy) Marco Ernesto Leva	(Argentina) Benjamin Pascual
Stage 2	(Australia) Daniel Sanders	(United States) Seth Quintero	(United States) Sara Price	(Chile) Lucas del Rio	(Portugal) Gonçalo Guerreiro	(Netherlands) Gert Huzink	(Lithuania) Karolis Raišys	(Argentina) Benjamin Pascual
Stage 3	(Spain) Tosha Schareina	(United States) Mitch Guthrie	(France) Stéphane Peterhansel	(Netherlands) Puck Klaassen	(United States) Brock Heger	(Netherlands) Mitchel van den Brink	(Poland) Tomasz Białkowski	(Spain) Jordi Juvanteny
Stage 4	(Spain) Tosha Schareina	(South Africa) Henk Lategan	(France) Stéphane Peterhansel	(Argentina) Nicolás Cavigliasso	(United States) Brock Heger	(Czech Republic) Martin Macík	(Lithuania) Karolis Raišys	(Argentina) Benjamin Pascual
Stage 5	(Argentina) Luciano Benavides	(Spain) Nani Roma	(Lithuania) Rokas Baciuška	(Chile) Lucas del Rio	(United States) Kyle Chaney	(Czech Republic) Martin Macík	(Lithuania) Karolis Raišys	(Spain) Jordi Juvanteny
Stage 6	(United States) Ricky Brabec	(Qatar) Nasser Al-Attiyah	(United States) Sara Price	(Chile) Ignacio Casale	(France) Xavier de Soultrait	(Czech Republic) Aleš Loprais	(Lithuania) Karolis Raišys	(Spain) Fran Gómez Pallas
Stage 7	(Argentina) Luciano Benavides	(Sweden) Mattias Ekström	(France) Stéphane Peterhansel	(Argentina) Kevin Benavides	(Argentina) Jeremías Gonzalez Ferioli	(Lithuania) Vaidotas Žala	(Lithuania) Karolis Raišys	(Spain) Jordi Juvanteny
Stage 8	(Argentina) Luciano Benavides	(South Africa) Saood Variawa	(Lithuania) Rokas Baciuška	(Netherlands) Puck Klaassen	(United States) Brock Heger	(Netherlands) Mitchel van den Brink	(Czech Republic) Ondrej Klymciw	(Spain) Jordi Juvanteny
Stage 9	(Spain) Tosha Schareina	(Poland) Eryk Goczał	(Lithuania) Rokas Baciuška	(Netherlands) Paul Spierings	(Chile) Francisco López Contardo	(Czech Republic) Aleš Loprais	(France) Maxence Gublin	(Argentina) Benjamin Pascual
Stage 10	(France) Adrien Van Beveren	(France) Mathieu Serradori	(Lithuania) Rokas Baciuška	(Netherlands) Paul Spierings	(United States) Brock Heger	(Czech Republic) Aleš Loprais	(Czech Republic) Ondrej Klymciw	(Spain) Fran Gómez Pallas
Stage 11	(United States) Skyler Howes	(Sweden) Mattias Ekström	(Lithuania) Rokas Baciuška	(Argentina) Nicolás Cavigliasso	(United States) Brock Heger	(Czech Republic) Aleš Loprais	(Indonesia) Shammie Baridwan	(Spain) Jordi Juvanteny
Stage 12	(United States) Ricky Brabec	(Qatar) Nasser Al-Attiyah	(United States) Sara Price	(Argentina) Kevin Benavides	(Argentina) Jeremías Gonzalez Ferioli	(Netherlands) Mitchel van den Brink	(France) Maxence Gublin	(Spain) Esther Merino
Stage 13	(Spain) Edgar Canet	(Sweden) Mattias Ekström	(Lithuania) Rokas Baciuška	(Argentina) Kevin Benavides	(Portugal) Joao Monteiro	(Netherlands) Kay Huzink	(Lithuania) Karolis Raišys	(Argentina) Benjamin Pascual
Rally winners	(Argentina) Luciano Benavides	(Qatar) Nasser Al-Attiyah	(Lithuania) Rokas Baciuška	(Spain) Pau Navarro	(United States) Brock Heger	(Lithuania) Vaidotas Žala	(Lithuania) Karolis Raišys	(Spain) Jordi Juvanteny

== Stage results ==
=== Bikes ===
	Stage result					General classification				
Stage	Pos	Competitor	Make	Time	Gap	Pos	Competitor	Make	Time	Gap
Prologue	1	(Spain) Edgar Canet	KTM	00:11:31		1	(Spain) Edgar Canet	KTM	00:11:31	
Prologue	2	(Australia) Daniel Sanders	KTM	00:11:34	00:00:03	2	(Australia) Daniel Sanders	KTM	00:11:34	00:00:03
Prologue	3	(United States) Ricky Brabec	Honda	00:11:36	00:00:05	3	(United States) Ricky Brabec	Honda	00:11:36	00:00:05
Stage 1	1	(Spain) Edgar Canet	KTM	03:16:11		1	(Spain) Edgar Canet	KTM	03:27:42	
Stage 1	2	(Australia) Daniel Sanders	KTM	03:17:13	00:01:02	2	(Australia) Daniel Sanders	KTM	03:28:47	00:01:05
Stage 1	3	(United States) Ricky Brabec	Honda	03:17:43	00:01:32	3	(United States) Ricky Brabec	Honda	03:29:19	00:01:37
Stage 2	1	(Australia) Daniel Sanders	KTM	04:13:37		1	(Australia) Daniel Sanders	KTM	07:42:24	
Stage 2	2	(Spain) Edgar Canet	KTM	04:15:12	00:01:35	2	(Spain) Edgar Canet	KTM	07:42:54	00:00:30
Stage 2	3	(United States) Ricky Brabec	Honda	04:15:23	00:01:46	3	(United States) Ricky Brabec	Honda	07:44:42	00:02:18
Stage 3	1	(Spain) Tosha Schareina	Honda	04:26:39		1	(Australia) Daniel Sanders	KTM	12:12:31	
Stage 3	2	(United States) Ricky Brabec	Honda	4:28:56	00:02:17	2	(United States) Ricky Brabec	Honda	12:13:38	00:01:07
Stage 3	3	(Australia) Daniel Sanders	KTM	04:30:07	00:03:28	3	(Spain) Tosha Schareina	Honda	12:13:44	00:01:13
Stage 4	1	(Spain) Tosha Schareina	Honda	04:31:56		1	(Spain) Tosha Schareina	Honda	16:45:50	
Stage 4	2	(United States) Ricky Brabec	Honda	04:32:02	00:00:06	2	(United States) Ricky Brabec	Honda	16:45:50	00:00:00
Stage 4	3	(United States) Skyler Howes	Honda	04:32:06	00:00:10	3	(Australia) Daniel Sanders	KTM	16:47:04	00:01:24
Stage 5	1	(Argentina) Luciano Benavides	KTM	04:05:16		1	(Australia) Daniel Sanders	KTM	20:58:10	
Stage 5	2	(Chile) José Ignacio Cornejo	Hero	04:09:07	00:03:51	2	(United States) Ricky Brabec	Honda	21:00:12	00:02:02
Stage 5	3	(Australia) Daniel Sanders	KTM	04:11:06	00:05:50	3	(Argentina) Luciano Benavides	KTM	21:04:05	00:05:55
Stage 6	1	(United States) Ricky Brabec	Honda	03:41:33		1	(Australia) Daniel Sanders	KTM	24:41:00	
Stage 6	2	(Spain) Tosha Schareina	Honda	03:42:47	00:01:14	2	(United States) Ricky Brabec	Honda	24:41:45	00:00:45
Stage 6	3	(Australia) Daniel Sanders	KTM	03:42:50	00:01:17	3	(Argentina) Luciano Benavides	KTM	24:51:15	00:10:15
Stage 7	1	(Argentina) Luciano Benavides	KTM	04:00:56		1	(Australia) Daniel Sanders	KTM	28:47:31	
Stage 7	2	(Spain) Edgar Canet	KTM	04:05:43	00:04:47	2	(United States) Ricky Brabec	Honda	28:51:56	00:04:25
Stage 7	3	(France) Adrien Van Beveren	Honda	04:05:53	00:04:57	3	(Argentina) Luciano Benavides	KTM	28:52:11	00:04:40
Stage 8	1	(Argentina) Luciano Benavides	KTM	04:26:39		1	(Argentina) Luciano Benavides	KTM	33:18:50	
Stage 8	2	(Australia) Daniel Sanders	KTM	04:31:29	00:04:50	2	(Australia) Daniel Sanders	KTM	33:19:00	00:00:10
Stage 8	3	(United States) Ricky Brabec	Honda	04:31:41	00:05:02	3	(United States) Ricky Brabec	Honda	33:23:37	00:04:47
Stage 9	1	(Spain) Tosha Schareina	Honda	03:45:42		1	(Australia) Daniel Sanders	KTM	37:09:17	
Stage 9	2	(Australia) Daniel Sanders	KTM	03:50:17	00:04:35	2	(United States) Ricky Brabec	Honda	37:15:41	00:06:24
Stage 9	3	(South Africa) Michael Docherty	KTM	03:50:32	00:04:50	3	(Argentina) Luciano Benavides	KTM	37:16:22	00:07:05
Stage 10	1	(France) Adrien Van Beveren	Honda	04:15:43		1	(United States) Ricky Brabec	Honda	41:35:13	
Stage 10	2	(United States) Ricky Brabec	Honda	04:19:32	00:03:49	2	(Argentina) Luciano Benavides	KTM	41:36:09	00:00:56
Stage 10	3	(Argentina) Luciano Benavides	KTM	04:19:47	00:04:04	3	(Spain) Tosha Schareina	Honda	41:50:56	00:15:43
Stage 11	1	(United States) Skyler Howes	Honda	03:09:02		1	(Argentina) Luciano Benavides	KTM	44:48:48	
Stage 11	2	(France) Adrien Van Beveren	Honda	03:09:23	00:00:21	2	(United States) Ricky Brabec	Honda	44:49:11	00:00:23
Stage 11	3	(Spain) Edgar Canet	KTM	03:10:17	00:01:15	3	(Spain) Tosha Schareina	Honda	45:04:04	00:15:16
Stage 12	1	(United States) Ricky Brabec	Honda	03:19:01		1	(United States) Ricky Brabec	Honda	48:08:12	
Stage 12	2	(Argentina) Luciano Benavides	KTM	03:22:44	00:03:43	2	(Argentina) Luciano Benavides	KTM	48:11:32	00:03:20
Stage 12	3	(Spain) Tosha Schareina	Honda	03:31:59	00:12:58	3	(Spain) Tosha Schareina	Honda	48:36:03	00:27:51
Stage 13	1	(Spain) Edgar Canet	KTM	00:49:03		1	(Argentina) Luciano Benavides	KTM	49:00:41	
Stage 13	2	(Argentina) Luciano Benavides	KTM	00:49:09	00:00:06	2	(United States) Ricky Brabec	Honda	49:00:43	00:00:02
Stage 13	3	(Spain) Tosha Schareina	Honda	00:49:50	00:00:47	3	(Spain) Tosha Schareina	Honda	49:25:53	00:25:12

=== Cars ===
	Stage result					General classification				
Stage	Pos	Competitor	Make	Time	Gap	Pos	Competitor	Make	Time	Gap
Prologue	1	(Sweden) Mattias Ekström	Ford	00:10:48		results of Prologue aren't accountable towards GC, only for starting position on Stage 1				
Prologue	2	(United States) Mitch Guthrie	Ford	00:10:56	00:00:08	results of Prologue aren't accountable towards GC, only for starting position on Stage 1				
Prologue	3	(Belgium) Guillaume De Mévius	Mini	00:10:56	00:00:08	results of Prologue aren't accountable towards GC, only for starting position on Stage 1				
Stage 1	1	(Belgium) Guillaume De Mévius	Mini	03:07:49		1	(Belgium) Guillaume De Mévius	Mini	03:07:49	
Stage 1	2	(Qatar) Nasser Al-Attiyah	Dacia	03:08:29	00:00:40	2	(Qatar) Nasser Al-Attiyah	Dacia	03:08:29	00:00:40
Stage 1	3	(Czech Republic) Martin Prokop	Ford	03:09:16	00:01:27	3	(Czech Republic) Martin Prokop	Ford	03:09:16	00:01:27
Stage 2	1	(United States) Seth Quintero	Toyota	03:57:16		1	(Qatar) Nasser Al-Attiyah	Dacia	07:12:16	
Stage 2	2	(South Africa) Henk Lategan	Toyota	03:58:58	00:01:42	2	(United States) Seth Quintero	Toyota	07:12:23	00:00:07
Stage 2	3	(Saudi Arabia) Yazeed Al-Rajhi	Toyota	03:59:12	00:01:56	3	(Belgium) Guillaume De Mévius	Mini	07:13:25	00:01:09
Stage 3	1	(United States) Mitch Guthrie	Ford	04:04:32		1	(United States) Mitch Guthrie	Ford	11:27:20	
Stage 3	2	(Czech Republic) Martin Prokop	Ford	04:06:59	00:02:27	2	(Czech Republic) Martin Prokop	Ford	11:27:46	00:00:26
Stage 3	3	(South Africa) Guy Botterill	Toyota	04:09:55	00:05:23	3	(Sweden) Mattias Ekström	Ford	11:28:28	00:01:08
Stage 4	1	(South Africa) Henk Lategan	Toyota	04:47:08		1	(South Africa) Henk Lategan	Toyota	16:29:15	
Stage 4	2	(Qatar) Nasser Al-Attiyah	Dacia	04:54:11	00:07:03	2	(Qatar) Nasser Al-Attiyah	Dacia	16:33:10	00:03:55
Stage 4	3	(Poland) Marek Goczał	Toyota	05:01:23	00:14:15	3	(Sweden) Mattias Ekström	Ford	16:42:15	00:13:00
Stage 5	1	(Spain) Nani Roma	Ford	03:54:42		1	(South Africa) Henk Lategan	Toyota	20:36:44	
Stage 5	2	(United States) Mitch Guthrie	Ford	03:54:46	00:00:04	2	(Qatar) Nasser Al-Attiyah	Dacia	20:40:01	00:03:17
Stage 5	3	(Czech Republic) Martin Prokop	Ford	03:57:00	00:02:18	3	(Sweden) Mattias Ekström	Ford	20:42:22	00:05:38
Stage 6	1	(Qatar) Nasser Al-Attiyah	Dacia	03:38:28		1	(Qatar) Nasser Al-Attiyah	Dacia	24:18:29	
Stage 6	2	(France) Sébastien Loeb	Dacia	03:41:26	00:02:58	2	(South Africa) Henk Lategan	Toyota	24:24:39	00:06:10
Stage 6	3	(United States) Seth Quintero	Toyota	03:41:47	00:03:19	3	(Spain) Nani Roma	Ford	24:27:42	00:09:13
Stage 7	1	(Sweden) Mattias Ekström	Ford	03:44:22		1	(Qatar) Nasser Al-Attiyah	Dacia	28:10:15	
Stage 7	2	(Portugal) Joao Ferreira	Toyota	03:48:49	00:04:27	2	(Sweden) Mattias Ekström	Ford	28:15:02	00:04:47
Stage 7	3	(United States) Mitch Guthrie	Ford	03:49:17	00:04:55	3	(Spain) Nani Roma	Ford	28:17:30	00:07:15
Stage 8	1	(South Africa) Saood Variawa	Toyota	04:20:35		1	(Qatar) Nasser Al-Attiyah	Dacia	32:32:06	
Stage 8	2	(South Africa) Henk Lategan	Toyota	04:20:38	00:00:03	2	(Sweden) Mattias Ekström	Ford	32:36:06	00:04:00
Stage 8	3	(Sweden) Mattias Ekström	Ford	04:21:04	00:00:29	3	(South Africa) Henk Lategan	Toyota	32:38:14	00:06:08
Stage 9	1	(Poland) Eryk Goczał	Toyota	03:46:42		1	(Spain) Nani Roma	Ford	36:44:01	
Stage 9	2	(Poland) Michal Goczał	Toyota	03:54:27	00:07:45	2	(Spain) Carlos Sainz	Ford	36:44:58	00:00:57
Stage 9	3	(Australia) Toby Price	Toyota	03:58:18	00:11:36	3	(Qatar) Nasser Al-Attiyah	Dacia	36:45:11	00:01:10
Stage 10	1	(France) Mathieu Serradori	Century	04:48:27		1	(Qatar) Nasser Al-Attiyah	Dacia	41:39:50	
Stage 10	2	(Qatar) Nasser Al-Attiyah	Dacia	04:54:39	00:06:12	2	(South Africa) Henk Lategan	Toyota	41:51:50	00:12:00
Stage 10	3	(France) Sébastien Loeb	Dacia	04:57:47	00:09:20	3	(Spain) Nani Roma	Ford	41:52:40	00:12:50
Stage 11	1	(Sweden) Mattias Ekström	Ford	02:47:22		1	(Qatar) Nasser Al-Attiyah	Dacia	44:39:59	
Stage 11	2	(France) Romain Dumas	Ford	02:48:44	00:01:22	2	(Spain) Nani Roma	Ford	44:48:39	00:08:40
Stage 11	3	(Spain) Carlos Sainz	Ford	02:49:48	00:02:26	3	(France) Sébastien Loeb	Dacia	44:58:36	00:18:37
Stage 12	1	(Qatar) Nasser Al-Attiyah	Dacia	03:21:52		1	(Qatar) Nasser Al-Attiyah	Dacia	48:01:51	
Stage 12	2	(United States) Mitch Guthrie	Ford	03:22:56	00:01:04	2	(Spain) Nani Roma	Ford	48:17:53	00:16:02
Stage 12	3	(Australia) Toby Price	Toyota	03:23:17	00:01:25	3	(Sweden) Mattias Ekström	Ford	48:25:12	00:23:21
Stage 13	1	(Sweden) Mattias Ekström	Ford	00:46:14		1	(Qatar) Nasser Al-Attiyah	Dacia	48:56:53	
Stage 13	2	(France) Sébastien Loeb	Dacia	00:46:22	00:00:08	2	(Spain) Nani Roma	Ford	49:06:35	00:09:42
Stage 13	3	(South Africa) Henk Lategan	Toyota	00:46:27	00:00:13	3	(Sweden) Mattias Ekström	Ford	49:11:26	00:14:33

=== Stock ===
	Stage result					General classification				
Stage	Pos	Competitor	Make	Time	Gap	Pos	Competitor	Make	Time	Gap
Prologue	1	(United States) Sara Price	Defender	00:12:03		results of Prologue aren't accountable towards GC, only for starting position on Stage 1				
Prologue	2	(France) Stéphane Peterhansel	Defender	00:12:07	00:00:04	results of Prologue aren't accountable towards GC, only for starting position on Stage 1				
Prologue	3	(Lithuania) Rokas Baciuška	Defender	00:12:08	00:00:05	results of Prologue aren't accountable towards GC, only for starting position on Stage 1				
Stage 1	1	(Lithuania) Rokas Baciuška	Defender	04:04:59		1	(Lithuania) Rokas Baciuška	Defender	04:04:59	
Stage 1	2	(France) Ronald Basso	Toyota	04:11:48	00:06:49	2	(France) Ronald Basso	Toyota	04:11:48	00:06:49
Stage 1	3	(Japan) Akira Miura	Toyota	04:16:27	00:11:28	3	(Japan) Akira Miura	Toyota	04:16:27	00:11:28
Stage 2	1	(United States) Sara Price	Defender	04:57:33		1	(Lithuania) Rokas Baciuška	Defender	09:03:54	
Stage 2	2	(Lithuania) Rokas Baciuška	Defender	04:58:55	00:01:22	2	(France) Ronald Basso	Toyota	09:15:54	00:12:00
Stage 2	3	(France) Stéphane Peterhansel	Defender	04:58:59	00:01:26	3	(Japan) Akira Miura	Toyota	09:20:01	00:16:07
Stage 3	1	(France) Stéphane Peterhansel	Defender	04:59:07		1	(Lithuania) Rokas Baciuška	Defender	14:04:07	
Stage 3	2	(Lithuania) Rokas Baciuška	Defender	05:00:13	00:01:06	2	(France) Ronald Basso	Toyota	14:32:56	00:28:49
Stage 3	3	(United States) Sara Price	Defender	05:01:39	00:02:32	3	(France) Stéphane Peterhansel	Defender	14:59:54	00:55:47
Stage 4	1	(France) Stéphane Peterhansel	Defender	05:52:28		1	(Lithuania) Rokas Baciuška	Defender	20:08:37	
Stage 4	2	(United States) Sara Price	Defender	05:57:40	00:05:12	2	(France) Ronald Basso	Toyota	20:51:13	00:42:36
Stage 4	3	(Lithuania) Rokas Baciuška	Defender	06:04:30	00:11:52	3	(France) Stéphane Peterhansel	Defender	20:52:32	00:43:55
Stage 5	1	(Lithuania) Rokas Baciuška	Defender	04:29:32		1	(Lithuania) Rokas Baciuška	Defender	24:38:09	
Stage 5	2	(France) Stéphane Peterhansel	Defender	04:30:09	00:00:37	2	(France) Stéphane Peterhansel	Defender	25:22:41	00:44:32
Stage 5	3	(United States) Sara Price	Defender	04:52:09	00:22:37	3	(France) Ronald Basso	Toyota	25:50:19	01:12:10
Stage 6	1	(United States) Sara Price	Defender	04:32:10		1	(Lithuania) Rokas Baciuška	Defender	29:12:58	
Stage 6	2	(Lithuania) Rokas Baciuška	Defender	04:34:49	00:02:39	2	(France) Stéphane Peterhansel	Defender	29:57:41	00:44:43
Stage 6	3	(France) Stéphane Peterhansel	Defender	04:35:00	00:02:50	3	(France) Ronald Basso	Toyota	31:04:54	01:51:56
Stage 7	1	(France) Stéphane Peterhansel	Defender	04:20:29		1	(Lithuania) Rokas Baciuška	Defender	33:33:48	
Stage 7	2	(Lithuania) Rokas Baciuška	Defender	04:20:50	00:00:21	2	(France) Stéphane Peterhansel	Defender	34:18:10	00:44:22
Stage 7	3	(United States) Sara Price	Defender	04:26:54	00:06:25	3	(France) Ronald Basso	Toyota	35:51:36	02:17:48
Stage 8	1	(Lithuania) Rokas Baciuška	Defender	05:06:26		1	(Lithuania) Rokas Baciuška	Defender	38:40:14	
Stage 8	2	(United States) Sara Price	Defender	05:08:10	00:01:44	2	(United States) Sara Price	Defender	41:18:05	02:37:51
Stage 8	3	(Japan) Akira Miura	Toyota	06:14:41	01:08:15	3	(France) Ronald Basso	Toyota	42:19:37	03:39:23
Stage 9	1	(Lithuania) Rokas Baciuška	Defender	04:36:24		1	(Lithuania) Rokas Baciuška	Defender	43:16:38	
Stage 9	2	(United States) Sara Price	Defender	05:06:03	00:29:39	2	(United States) Sara Price	Defender	46:24:08	03:07:30
Stage 9	3	(Japan) Akira Miura	Toyota	05:12:55	00:36:31	3	(France) Ronald Basso	Toyota	47:40:34	04:23:56
Stage 10	1	(Lithuania) Rokas Baciuška	Defender	06:09:01		1	(Lithuania) Rokas Baciuška	Defender	49:25:39	
Stage 10	2	(United States) Sara Price	Defender	06:30:42	00:21:41	2	(United States) Sara Price	Defender	52:54:50	03:29:11
Stage 10	3	(France) Stéphane Peterhansel	Defender	06:31:27	00:22:26	3	(France) Ronald Basso	Toyota	54:43:36	05:17:57
Stage 11	1	(Lithuania) Rokas Baciuška	Defender	03:28:30		1	(Lithuania) Rokas Baciuška	Defender	52:54:09	
Stage 11	2	(France) Stéphane Peterhansel	Defender	03:29:19	00:00:49	2	(United States) Sara Price	Defender	56:53:18	03:59:09
Stage 11	3	(United States) Sara Price	Defender	03:58:28	00:29:58	3	(France) Ronald Basso	Toyota	58:55:00	06:00:51
Stage 12	1	(United States) Sara Price	Defender	04:17:35		1	(Lithuania) Rokas Baciuška	Defender	57:13:54	
Stage 12	2	(France) Stéphane Peterhansel	Defender	04:19:00	00:01:25	2	(United States) Sara Price	Defender	61:10:53	03:56:59
Stage 12	3	(Lithuania) Rokas Baciuška	Defender	04:19:45	00:02:10	3	(France) Ronald Basso	Toyota	65:43:47	08:29:53
Stage 13	1	(Lithuania) Rokas Baciuška	Defender	00:55:51		1	(Lithuania) Rokas Baciuška	Defender	58:09:45	
Stage 13	2	(France) Stéphane Peterhansel	Defender	00:56:23	00:00:32	2	(United States) Sara Price	Defender	62:07:45	03:58:00
Stage 13	3	(United States) Sara Price	Defender	00:56:52	00:01:01	3	(France) Ronald Basso	Toyota	66:44:14	08:34:29

=== Challenger (T3) ===
	Stage result					General classification				
Stage	Pos	Competitor	Make	Time	Gap	Pos	Competitor	Make	Time	Gap
Prologue	1	(Netherlands) Paul Spierings	Taurus	00:12:31		results of Prologue aren't accountable towards GC, only for starting position on Stage 1				
Prologue	2	(Netherlands) Puck Klaassen	GRallyTeam	00:12:37	00:00:06	results of Prologue aren't accountable towards GC, only for starting position on Stage 1				
Prologue	3	(Saudi Arabia) Dania Akeel	Taurus	00:12:44	00:00:13	results of Prologue aren't accountable towards GC, only for starting position on Stage 1				
Stage 1	1	(Argentina) David Zille	Taurus	03:32:50		1	(Argentina) David Zille	Taurus	03:32:50	
Stage 1	2	(Netherlands) Paul Spierings	Taurus	03:33:32	00:00:42	2	(Netherlands) Paul Spierings	Taurus	03:33:32	00:00:42
Stage 1	3	(Argentina) Nicolás Cavigliasso	Taurus	03:34:53	00:02:03	3	(Argentina) Nicolás Cavigliasso	Taurus	03:34:53	00:02:03
Stage 2	1	(Chile) Lucas del Rio	Taurus	04:26:49		1	(Argentina) David Zille	Taurus	08:09:03	
Stage 2	2	(Saudi Arabia) Yasir Seaidan	Taurus	04:29:29	00:02:40	2	(Saudi Arabia) Yasir Seaidan	Taurus	08:11:01	00:01:58
Stage 2	3	(Netherlands) Puck Klaassen	GRallyTeam	04:30:46	00:03:57	3	(Chile) Lucas del Rio	Taurus	08:11:25	00:02:22
Stage 3	1	(Netherlands) Puck Klaassen	GRallyTeam	04:28:25		1	(Saudi Arabia) Yasir Seaidan	Taurus	12:47:51	
Stage 3	2	(Saudi Arabia) Yasir Seaidan	Taurus	04:36:50	00:08:25	2	(Netherlands) Puck Klaassen	GRallyReam	12:50:44	00:02:53
Stage 3	3	(Spain) Pau Navarro	Taurus	04:39:43	00:11:18	3	(Chile) Lucas del Rio	Taurus	12:51:41	00:03:50
Stage 4	1	(Argentina) Nicolás Cavigliasso	Taurus	05:23:12		1	(Saudi Arabia) Yasir Seaidan	Taurus	18:20:19	
Stage 4	2	(Spain) Pau Navarro	Taurus	05:25:41	00:02:29	2	(Spain) Pau Navarro	Taurus	18:21:04	00:00:45
Stage 4	3	(Saudi Arabia) Dania Akeel	Taurus	05:27:18	00:04:06	3	(Argentina) Nicolás Cavigliasso	Taurus	18:27:04	00:06:45
Stage 5	1	(Chile) Lucas del Rio	Taurus	04:18:09		1	(Spain) Pau Navarro	Taurus	22:39:37	
Stage 5	2	(Spain) Pau Navarro	Taurus	04:18:33	00:00:24	2	(Saudi Arabia) Yasir Seaidan	Taurus	22:44:03	00:04:26
Stage 5	3	(Saudi Arabia) Dania Akeel	Taurus	04:18:37	00:00:28	3	(Argentina) Nicolás Cavigliasso	Taurus	22:48:02	00:08:25
Stage 6	1	(Chile) Ignacio Casale	Taurus	03:58:57		1	(Spain) Pau Navarro	Taurus	26:46:17	
Stage 6	2	(Saudi Arabia) Dania Akeel	Taurus	03:59:35	00:00:38	2	(Argentina) Nicolás Cavigliasso	Taurus	26:51:14	00:04:57
Stage 6	3	(Argentina) Kevin Benavides	Taurus	04:00:37	00:01:40	3	(Chile) Lucas del Rio	Taurus	27:12:11	00:25:54
Stage 7	1	(Argentina) Kevin Benavides	Taurus	04:22:57		1	(Spain) Pau Navarro	Taurus	31:17:03	
Stage 7	2	(Saudi Arabia) Yasir Seaidan	Taurus	04:27:36	00:04:39	2	(Argentina) Nicolás Cavigliasso	Taurus	31:19:51	00:02:48
Stage 7	3	(Argentina) Nicolás Cavigliasso	Taurus	04:28:37	00:05:40	3	(Chile) Lucas del Rio	Taurus	31:46:12	00:29:09
Stage 8	1	(Netherlands) Puck Klaassen	GRallyTeam	04:55:38		1	(Spain) Pau Navarro	Taurus	36:18:05	
Stage 8	2	(Saudi Arabia) Dania Akeel	Taurus	04:55:41	00:00:03	2	(Argentina) Nicolás Cavigliasso	Taurus	36:20:07	00:02:02
Stage 8	3	(Netherlands) Paul Spierings	Taurus	04:55:59	00:00:21	3	(Chile) Lucas del Rio	Taurus	36:58:51	00:40:46
Stage 9	1	(Netherlands) Paul Spierings	Taurus	04:08:57		1	(Spain) Pau Navarro	Taurus	40:47:03	
Stage 9	2	(Argentina) Kevin Benavides	Taurus	04:10:17	00:01:20	2	(Saudi Arabia) Yasir Seaidan	Taurus	41:28:44	00:41:41
Stage 9	3	(Argentina) David Zille	Taurus	04:15:31	00:06:34	3	(Chile) Lucas del Rio	Taurus	41:44:37	00:57:34
Stage 10	1	(Netherlands) Paul Spierings	Taurus	05:14:55		1	(Spain) Pau Navarro	Taurus	46:27:59	
Stage 10	2	(Saudi Arabia) Yasir Seaidan	Taurus	05:17:45	00:02:50	2	(Saudi Arabia) Yasir Seaidan	Taurus	46:46:29	00:18:30
Stage 10	3	(Argentina) Kevin Benavides	Taurus	05:18:17	00:03:22	3	(Chile) Lucas del Rio	Taurus	47:13:47	00:45:48
Stage 11	1	(Argentina) Nicolás Cavigliasso	Taurus	03:17:27		1	(Spain) Pau Navarro	Taurus	49:52:46	
Stage 11	2	(Netherlands) Paul Spierings	Taurus	03:17:56	00:00:29	2	(Saudi Arabia) Yasir Seaidan	Taurus	50:17:54	00:25:08
Stage 11	3	(Saudi Arabia) Dania Akeel	Taurus	03:18:30	00:01:03	3	(Argentina) Nicolás Cavigliasso	Taurus	50:36:50	00:44:04
Stage 12	1	(Argentina) Kevin Benavides	Taurus	03:44:52		1	(Spain) Pau Navarro	Taurus	53:49:52	
Stage 12	2	(Saudi Arabia) Dania Akeel	Taurus	03:47:07	00:02:15	2	(Saudi Arabia) Yasir Seaidan	Taurus	54:15:45	00:25:53
Stage 12	3	(Argentina) David Zille	Taurus	03:48:29	00:03:37	3	(Argentina) Nicolás Cavigliasso	Taurus	54:27:37	00:37:45
Stage 13	1	(Argentina) Kevin Benavides	Taurus	00:52:28		1	(Spain) Pau Navarro	Taurus	54:46:21	
Stage 13	2	(Luxembourg) Charles Munster	GRallyTeam	00:53:41	00:01:13	2	(Saudi Arabia) Yasir Seaidan	Taurus	55:09:43	00:23:22
Stage 13	3	(Chile) Lucas del Rio	Taurus	00:53:45	00:01:17	3	(Argentina) Nicolás Cavigliasso	Taurus	55:22:13	00:35:52

=== SSV (T4) ===
	Stage result					General classification				
Stage	Pos	Competitor	Make	Time	Gap	Pos	Competitor	Make	Time	Gap
Prologue	1	(United States) Brock Heger	Polaris	00:12:47		results of Prologue aren't accountable towards GC, only for starting position on Stage 1				
Prologue	2	(Portugal) Gonçalo Guerreiro	Polaris	00:12:51	00:00:04	results of Prologue aren't accountable towards GC, only for starting position on Stage 1				
Prologue	3	(United States) Kyle Chaney	Can-Am	00:12:53	00:00:06	results of Prologue aren't accountable towards GC, only for starting position on Stage 1				
Stage 1	1	(France) Xavier de Soultrait	Polaris	03:38:45		1	(France) Xavier de Soultrait	Polaris	03:38:45	
Stage 1	2	(Portugal) Alexandre Pinto	Polaris	03:42:19	00:03:34	2	(Portugal) Alexandre Pinto	Polaris	03:42:19	00:03:34
Stage 1	3	(United States) Brock Heger	Polaris	03:42:33	00:03:48	3	(United States) Brock Heger	Polaris	03:42:33	00:03:48
Stage 2	1	(Portugal) Gonçalo Guerreiro	Polaris	04:42:45		1	(France) Xavier de Soultrait	Polaris	08:24:16	
Stage 2	2	(France) Florent Vayssade	Polaris	04:43:47	00:01:02	2	(Portugal) Gonçalo Guerreiro	Polaris	08:26:03	00:01:47
Stage 2	3	(France) Xavier de Soultrait	Polaris	04:45:31	00:02:46	3	(United States) Brock Heger	Polaris	08:30:38	00:06:22
Stage 3	1	(United States) Brock Heger	Polaris	04:38:09		1	(United States) Brock Heger	Polaris	13:08:47	
Stage 3	2	(Portugal) Gonçalo Guerreiro	Polaris	04:43:27	00:05:18	2	(Portugal) Gonçalo Guerreiro	Polaris	13:09:30	00:00:43
Stage 3	3	(Portugal) Joao Monteiro	Can-Am	04:43:41	00:05:32	3	(France) Xavier de Soultrait	Polaris	13:19:54	00:11:07
Stage 4	1	(United States) Brock Heger	Polaris	05:21:48		1	(United States) Brock Heger	Polaris	18:30:35	
Stage 4	2	(Portugal) Joao Monteiro	Can-Am	05:37:50	00:16:02	2	(France) Xavier de Soultrait	Polaris	19:02:06	00:31:31
Stage 4	3	(Portugal) Joao Dias	Polaris	05:38:28	00:16:40	3	(Portugal) Alexandre Pinto	Polaris	19:18:31	00:47:56
Stage 5	1	(United States) Kyle Chaney	Can-Am	04:17:22		1	(United States) Brock Heger	Polaris	22:51:24	
Stage 5	2	(Chile) Francisco López Contardo	Can-Am	04:18:13	00:00:51	2	(France) Xavier de Soultrait	Polaris	23:29:00	00:37:36
Stage 5	3	(United States) Brock Heger	Polaris	04:20:49	00:03:27	3	(United States) Kyle Chaney	Can-Am	23:47:51	00:56:27
Stage 6	1	(France) Xavier de Soultrait	Polaris	03:59:53		1	(United States) Brock Heger	Polaris	26:56:33	
Stage 6	2	(United States) Kyle Chaney	Can-Am	04:02:00	00:02:07	2	(France) Xavier de Soultrait	Polaris	27:28:53	00:32:20
Stage 6	3	(Chile) Francisco López Contardo	Can-Am	04:02:27	00:02:34	3	(United States) Kyle Chaney	Can-Am	27:49:51	00:53:18
Stage 7	1	(Argentina) Jeremías Gonzalez Ferioli	Can-Am	04:32:58		1	(United States) Brock Heger	Polaris	31:42:13	
Stage 7	2	(United States) Kyle Chaney	Can-Am	04:33:05	00:00:07	2	(United States) Kyle Chaney	Can-Am	32:22:56	00:40:43
Stage 7	3	(Portugal) Joao Monteiro	Can-Am	04:33:07	00:00:09	3	(France) Xavier de Soultrait	Polaris	32:26:28	00:44:15
Stage 8	1	(United States) Brock Heger	Polaris	05:04:15		1	(United States) Brock Heger	Polaris	36:46:28	
Stage 8	2	(Argentina) Jeremías Gonzalez Ferioli	Can-Am	05:05:01	00:00:46	2	(Portugal) Joao Monteiro	Can-Am	37:33:37	00:47:09
Stage 8	3	(Portugal) Joao Monteiro	Can-Am	05:05:58	00:01:43	3	(United States) Kyle Chaney	Can-Am	37:37:55	00:51:27
Stage 9	1	(Chile) Francisco López Contardo	Can-Am	04:23:43		1	(United States) Brock Heger	Polaris	41:22:03	
Stage 9	2	(Sweden) Johan Kristoffersson	Polaris	04:24:16	00:00:33	2	(United States) Kyle Chaney	Can-Am	42:06:01	00:43:58
Stage 9	3	(United States) Hunter Miller	Can-Am	04:27:33	00:03:50	3	(Portugal) Joao Monteiro	Can-Am	42:24:09	01:02:06
Stage 10	1	(United States) Brock Heger	Polaris	05:18:14		1	(United States) Brock Heger	Polaris	42:04:42	
Stage 10	2	(France) Xavier de Soultrait	Polaris	05:19:29	00:01:15	2	(United States) Kyle Chaney	Can-Am	47:42:04	01:01:47
Stage 10	3	(Argentina) Jeremías Gonzalez Ferioli	Can-Am	05:23:23	00:05:09	3	(France) Xavier de Soultrait	Polaris	48:01:11	01:20:54
Stage 11	1	(United States) Brock Heger	Polaris	03:30:11		1	(United States) Brock Heger	Polaris	50:10:28	
Stage 11	2	(Argentina) Jeremías Gonzalez Ferioli	Can-Am	03:31:02	00:00:51	2	(United States) Kyle Chaney	Can-Am	51:16:34	01:06:06
Stage 11	3	(Sweden) Johan Kristoffersson	Polaris	03:33:16	00:03:05	3	(France) Xavier de Soultrait	Polaris	51:38:22	01:27:54
Stage 12	1	(Argentina) Jeremías Gonzalez Ferioli	Can-Am	03:51:36		1	(United States) Brock Heger	Polaris	54:14:13	
Stage 12	2	(Portugal) Joao Monteiro	Can-Am	03:58:31	00:06:55	2	(United States) Kyle Chaney	Can-Am	55:17:59	01:03:46
Stage 12	3	(United States) Hunter Miller	Can-Am	03:59:15	00:07:39	3	(France) Xavier de Soultrait	Polaris	55:38:38	01:24:25
Stage 13	1	(Portugal) Joao Monteiro	Can-Am	00:55:09		1	(United States) Brock Heger	Polaris	55:11:56	
Stage 13	2	(Sweden) Johan Kristoffersson	Polaris	00:55:23	00:00:14	2	(United States) Kyle Chaney	Can-Am	56:13:35	01:01:39
Stage 13	3	(Argentina) Jeremías Gonzalez Ferioli	Can-Am	00:55:29	00:00:20	3	(France) Xavier de Soultrait	Polaris	56:37:21	01:25:25

=== Trucks ===
	Stage result					General classification				
Stage	Pos	Competitor	Make	Time	Gap	Pos	Competitor	Make	Time	Gap
Prologue	1	(Netherlands) Mitchel van den Brink	Iveco	00:13:05		results of Prologue aren't accountable towards GC, only for starting position on Stage 1				
Prologue	2	(Lithuania) Vaidotas Žala	Iveco	00:13:08	00:00:03	results of Prologue aren't accountable towards GC, only for starting position on Stage 1				
Prologue	3	(Netherlands) Gert Huzink	Renault	00:13:11	00:00:06	results of Prologue aren't accountable towards GC, only for starting position on Stage 1				
Stage 1	1	(Czech Republic) Aleš Loprais	Iveco	03:42:15		1	(Czech Republic) Aleš Loprais	Iveco	03:42:15	
Stage 1	2	(Netherlands) Mitchel van den Brink	Iveco	03:44:02	00:01:47	2	(Netherlands) Mitchel van den Brink	Iveco	03:44:02	00:01:47
Stage 1	3	(Czech Republic) Martin Macík	Iveco	03:49:34	00:07:19	3	(Czech Republic) Martin Macík	Iveco	03:49:34	00:07:19
Stage 2	1	(Netherlands) Gert Huzink	Renault	04:42:45		1	(Netherlands) Mitchel van den Brink	Iveco	08:29:58	
Stage 2	2	(Lithuania) Vaidotas Žala	Iveco	04:43:17	00:00:32	2	(Lithuania) Vaidotas Žala	Iveco	08:33:04	00:03:06
Stage 2	3	(Czech Republic) Martin Macík	Iveco	04:43:54	00:01:09	3	(Czech Republic) Martin Macík	Iveco	08:33:28	00:03:30
Stage 3	1	(Netherlands) Mitchel van den Brink	Iveco	04:52:59		1	(Netherlands) Mitchel van den Brink	Iveco	13:22:57	
Stage 3	2	(Czech Republic) Aleš Loprais	Iveco	04:54:01	00:01:02	2	(Czech Republic) Martin Macík	Iveco	13:31:18	00:08:21
Stage 3	3	(Netherlands) Richard de Groot	Iveco	04:56:34	00:03:35	3	(Czech Republic) Aleš Loprais	Iveco	13:31:51	00:08:54
Stage 4	1	(Czech Republic) Martin Macík	Iveco	05:40:19		1	(Czech Republic) Martin Macík	Iveco	19:11:37	
Stage 4	2	(Netherlands) Mitchel van den Brink	Iveco	05:53:08	00:12:49	2	(Netherlands) Mitchel van den Brink	Iveco	19:16:05	00:04:28
Stage 4	3	(Lithuania) Vaidotas Žala	Iveco	05:58:28	00:18:09	3	(Czech Republic) Aleš Loprais	Iveco	19:41:39	00:30:02
Stage 5	1	(Czech Republic) Martin Macík	Iveco	04:30:26		1	(Czech Republic) Martin Macík	Iveco	23:42:03	
Stage 5	2	(Netherlands) Kay Huzink	Renault	04:33:44	00:03:18	2	(Netherlands) Mitchel van den Brink	Iveco	23:50:32	00:08:29
Stage 5	3	(Netherlands) Mitchel van den Brink	Iveco	04:34:27	00:04:01	3	(Czech Republic) Aleš Loprais	Iveco	24:36:28	00:54:25
Stage 6	1	(Czech Republic) Aleš Loprais	Iveco	04:10:50		1	(Netherlands) Mitchel van den Brink	Iveco	28:04:08	
Stage 6	2	(Lithuania) Vaidotas Žala	Iveco	04:12:48	00:01:58	2	(Czech Republic) Martin Macík	Iveco	28:39:32	00:35:24
Stage 6	3	(Netherlands) Mitchel van den Brink	Iveco	04:13:36	00:02:46	3	(Czech Republic) Aleš Loprais	Iveco	28:50:18	00:46:10
Stage 7	1	(Lithuania) Vaidotas Žala	Iveco	04:27:24		1	(Netherlands) Mitchel van den Brink	Iveco	32:44:49	
Stage 7	2	(Czech Republic) Aleš Loprais	Iveco	04:28:47	00:01:23	2	(Czech Republic) Martin Macík	Iveco	33:13:34	00:28:45
Stage 7	3	(Czech Republic) Martin Macík	Iveco	04:34:02	00:06:38	3	(Lithuania) Vaidotas Žala	Iveco	33:17:51	00:33:02
Stage 8	1	(Netherlands) Mitchel van den Brink	Iveco	05:03:42		1	(Netherlands) Mitchel van den Brink	Iveco	37:48:31	
Stage 8	2	(Lithuania) Vaidotas Žala	Iveco	05:09:13	00:05:31	2	(Lithuania) Vaidotas Žala	Iveco	38:27:04	00:38:33
Stage 8	3	(Czech Republic) Martin Macík	Iveco	05:25:26	00:21:44	3	(Czech Republic) Martin Macík	Iveco	38:39:00	00:50:29
Stage 9	1	(Czech Republic) Aleš Loprais	Iveco	04:26:43		1	(Netherlands) Mitchel van den Brink	Iveco	42:20:28	
Stage 9	2	(Lithuania) Vaidotas Žala	Iveco	04:28:36	00:01:53	2	(Lithuania) Vaidotas Žala	Iveco	42:55:40	00:35:12
Stage 9	3	(Netherlands) Mitchel van den Brink	Iveco	04:31:57	00:05:14	3	(Czech Republic) Aleš Loprais	Iveco	43:16:12	00:55:44
Stage 10	1	(Czech Republic) Aleš Loprais	Iveco	05:35:54		1	(Lithuania) Vaidotas Žala	Iveco	48:33:11	
Stage 10	2	(Lithuania) Vaidotas Žala	Iveco	05:37:31	00:01:37	2	(Czech Republic) Aleš Loprais	Iveco	48:52:06	00:18:55
Stage 10	3	(Czech Republic) Martin Soltys	Tatra	05:58:24	00:22:30	3	(Netherlands) Mitchel van den Brink	Iveco	49:08:41	00:35:30
Stage 11	1	(Czech Republic) Aleš Loprais	Iveco	03:19:59		1	(Lithuania) Vaidotas Žala	Iveco	51:55:14	
Stage 11	2	(Lithuania) Vaidotas Žala	Iveco	03:22:30	00:02:31	2	(Czech Republic) Aleš Loprais	Iveco	52:12:05	00:16:24
Stage 11	3	(Netherlands) Mitchel van den Brink	Iveco	03:24:18	00:04:19	3	(Netherlands) Mitchel van den Brink	Iveco	52:32:59	00:37:18
Stage 12	1	(Netherlands) Mitchel van den Brink	Iveco	03:58:47		1	(Lithuania) Vaidotas Žala	Iveco	56:01:24	
Stage 12	2	(Lithuania) Vaidotas Žala	Iveco	04:05:43	00:06:56	2	(Czech Republic) Aleš Loprais	Iveco	56:22:48	00:21:24
Stage 12	3	(Czech Republic) Martin Soltys	Tatra	04:07:11	00:08:24	3	(Netherlands) Mitchel van den Brink	Iveco	56:31:46	00:30:22
Stage 13	1	(Netherlands) Kay Huzink	Renault	00:54:41		1	(Lithuania) Vaidotas Žala	Iveco	56:58:38	
Stage 13	2	(Netherlands) Mitchel van den Brink	Iveco	00:55:55	00:01:14	2	(Czech Republic) Aleš Loprais	Iveco	57:18:56	00:20:18
Stage 13	3	(Czech Republic) Aleš Loprais	Iveco	00:56:08	00:01:27	3	(Netherlands) Mitchel van den Brink	Iveco	57:27:41	00:29:03

=== Classics ===
	Stage result					General classification				
Stage	Pos	Competitor	Make	Points	Gap	Pos	Competitor	Make	Points	Gap
Prologue	1	(Italy) Francesco Pece	Nissan	3		1	(Italy) Francesco Pece	Nissan	3	
Prologue	2	(Lithuania) Karolis Raišys	Land Rover	4	+1	2	(Lithuania) Karolis Raišys	Land Rover	4	+1
Prologue	3	(Poland) Tomasz Staniszewski	Porsche	4	+1	3	(Poland) Tomasz Staniszewski	Porsche	4	+1
Stage 1	1	(Italy) Marco Ernesto Leva	Mitsubishi	71		1	(Italy) Marco Ernesto Leva	Mitsubishi	71	
Stage 1	2	(Indonesia) Shammie Baridwan	Toyota	76	+5	2	(Indonesia) Shammie Baridwan	Toyota	76	+5
Stage 1	3	(Lithuania) Karolis Raišys	Land Rover	77	+6	3	(Lithuania) Karolis Raišys	Land Rover	77	+6
Stage 2	1	(Lithuania) Karolis Raišys	Land Rover	48		1	(Lithuania) Karolis Raišys	Land Rover	125	
Stage 2	2	(France) Maxence Gublin	Land Rover	50	+2	2	(Italy) Marco Ernesto Leva	Mitsubishi	125	0
Stage 2	3	(Italy) Marco Ernesto Leva	Mitsubishi	54	+6	3	(France) Maxence Gublin	Land Rover	154	+29
Stage 3	1	(Poland) Tomasz Białkowski	DAF	97		1	(France) Maxence Gublin	Land Rover	254	
Stage 3	2	(France) Maxence Gublin	Land Rover	100	+3	2	(Lithuania) Karolis Raišys	Land Rover	262	+8
Stage 3	3	(Italy) Lorenzo Traglio	Nissan	106	+9	3	(Italy) Marco Ernesto Leva	Mitsubishi	279	+25
Stage 4	1	(Lithuania) Karolis Raišys	Land Rover	24		1	(France) Maxence Gublin	Land Rover	279	
Stage 4	2	(France) Maxence Gublin	Land Rover	25	+1	2	(Lithuania) Karolis Raišys	Land Rover	286	+7
Stage 4	3	(Croatia) Juraj Šebalj	Toyota	38	+14	3	(Italy) Marco Ernesto Leva	Mitsubishi	322	+43
Stage 5	1	(Lithuania) Karolis Raišys	Land Rover	43		1	(Lithuania) Karolis Raišys	Land Rover	329	
Stage 5	2	(Italy) Francesco Pece	Nissan	57	+14	2	(Italy) Marco Ernesto Leva	Mitsubishi	385	+56
Stage 5	3	(Italy) Marco Ernesto Leva	Mitsubishi	63	+20	3	(Spain) Juan Morera	Porsche	451	+122
Stage 6	1	(Lithuania) Karolis Raišys	Land Rover	58		1	(Lithuania) Karolis Raišys	Land Rover	387	
Stage 6	2	(Italy) Josef Unterholzner	Mitsubishi	60	+2	2	(Italy) Marco Ernesto Leva	Mitsubishi	484	+97
Stage 6	3	(Poland) Tomasz Białkowski	DAF	61	+3	3	(Spain) Juan Morera	Porsche	518	+131
Stage 7	1	(Lithuania) Karolis Raišys	Land Rover	61		1	(Lithuania) Karolis Raišys	Land Rover	448	
Stage 7	2	(Poland) Tomasz Staniszewski	Porsche	72	+11	2	(Spain) Juan Morera	Porsche	598	+150
Stage 7	3	(Italy) Josef Unterholzner	Mitsubishi	78	+17	3	(Italy) Josef Unterholzner	Mitsubishi	656	+208
Stage 8	1	(Czech Republic) Ondrej Klymciw	Mitsubishi	22		1	(Lithuania) Karolis Raišys	Land Rover	487	
Stage 8	2	(Spain) Juan Morera	Porsche	33	+11	2	(Spain) Juan Morera	Porsche	631	+144
Stage 8	3	(Lithuania) Karolis Raišys	Land Rover	39	+17	3	(Italy) Josef Unterholzner	Mitsubishi	719	+232
Stage 9	1	(France) Maxence Gublin	Land Rover	22		1	(Lithuania) Karolis Raišys	Land Rover	520	
Stage 9	2	(Lithuania) Karolis Raišys	Land Rover	33	+11	2	(Spain) Juan Morera	Porsche	694	+174
Stage 9	3	(Czech Republic) Ondrej Klymciw	Mitsubishi	35	+13	3	(Italy) Josef Unterholzner	Mitsubishi	772	+252
Stage 10	1	(Czech Republic) Ondrej Klymciw	Mitsubishi	28		1	(Lithuania) Karolis Raišys	Land Rover	553	
Stage 10	2	(Lithuania) Karolis Raišys	Land Rover	33	+5	2	(Italy) Josef Unterholzner	Mitsubishi	812	+259
Stage 10	3	(Poland) Tomasz Staniszewski	Porsche	33	+5	3	(Czech Republic) Ondrej Klymciw	Mitsubishi	832	+279
Stage 11	1	(Indonesia) Shammie Baridwan	Toyota	22		1	(Lithuania) Karolis Raišys	Land Rover	588	
Stage 11	2	(Lithuania) Karolis Raišys	Land Rover	35	+13	2	(Czech Republic) Ondrej Klymciw	Mitsubishi	923	+335
Stage 11	3	(France) Maxence Gublin	Land Rover	35	+13	3	(Italy) Josef Unterholzner	Mitsubishi	1024	+436
Stage 12	1	(France) Maxence Gublin	Land Rover	52		1	(Lithuania) Karolis Raišys	Land Rover	715	
Stage 12	2	(Czech Republic) Ondrej Klymciw	Mitsubishi	56	+4	2	(Czech Republic) Ondrej Klymciw	Mitsubishi	979	+264
Stage 12	3	(Canada) David Bensadoun	Toyota	56	+4	3	(Italy) Josef Unterholzner	Mitsubishi	1103	+388
Stage 13	1	(Lithuania) Karolis Raišys	Land Rover	20		1	(Lithuania) Karolis Raišys	Land Rover	735	
Stage 13	2	(Italy) Filippo Colnaghi	Nissan	20	0	2	(Czech Republic) Ondrej Klymciw	Mitsubishi	1003	+268
Stage 13	3	(Czech Republic) Ondrej Klymciw	Mitsubishi	24	+4	3	(Italy) Josef Unterholzner	Mitsubishi	1137	+402

=== Mission 1000 ===
	Stage result					General classification				
Stage	Pos	Competitor	Make	Points	Gap	Pos	Competitor	Make	Points	Gap
Prologue	1	(Argentina) Benjamin Pascual	Segway	15		1	(Argentina) Benjamin Pascual	Segway	15	
Prologue	2	(China) Yi Guanghui	Segway	15	0	2	(China) Yi Guanghui	Segway	15	0
Prologue	3	(China) Jie Yang	Segway	15	0	3	(China) Jie Yang	Segway	15	0
Stage 1	1	(Argentina) Benjamin Pascual	Segway	10		1	(Argentina) Benjamin Pascual	Segway	25	
Stage 1	2	(Spain) Jordi Juvanteny	MAN	10	0	2	(China) Yi Guanghui	Segway	25	0
Stage 1	3	(Spain) Miguel Puertas	Arctic Leopard	10	0	3	(China) Jie Yang	Segway	22	-3
Stage 2	1	(Argentina) Benjamin Pascual	Segway	10		1	(Argentina) Benjamin Pascual	Segway	35	
Stage 2	2	(China) Yi Guanghui	Segway	10	0	2	(China) Yi Guanghui	Segway	35	0
Stage 2	3	(Spain) Jordi Juvanteny	MAN	10	0	3	(China) Jie Yang	Segway	32	-3
Stage 3	1	(Spain) Jordi Juvanteny	MAN	15		1	(Argentina) Benjamin Pascual	Segway	45	
Stage 3	2	(Argentina) Benjamin Pascual	Segway	10	-5	2	(China) Yi Guanghui	Segway	45	0
Stage 3	3	(China) Yi Guanghui	Segway	10	-5	3	(Spain) Jordi Juvanteny	MAN	45	0
Stage 4	1	(Argentina) Benjamin Pascual	Segway	20		1	(Argentina) Benjamin Pascual	Segway	65	
Stage 4	2	(Spain) Jordi Juvanteny	MAN	15	-5	2	(China) Yi Guanghui	Segway	60	-5
Stage 4	3	(Spain) Fran Gómez Pallas	Arctic Leopard	15	-5	3	(Spain) Jordi Juvanteny	MAN	60	-5
Stage 5	1	(Spain) Jordi Juvanteny	MAN	30		1	(Spain) Jordi Juvanteny	MAN	90	
Stage 5	2	(Spain) Fran Gómez Pallas	Arctic Leopard	30	0	2	(Argentina) Benjamin Pascual	Segway	85	-5
Stage 5	3	(China) Jie Yang	Segway	22	-8	3	(Spain) Fran Gómez Pallas	Arctic Leopard	76	-14
Stage 6	1	(Spain) Fran Gómez Pallas	Arctic Leopard	10		1	(Spain) Jordi Juvanteny	MAN	100	
Stage 6	2	(Spain) Esther Merino	Arctic Leopard	10	0	2	(Argentina) Benjamin Pascual	Segway	95	-5
Stage 6	3	(Argentina) Benjamin Pascual	Segway	10	0	3	(Spain) Fran Gómez Pallas	Arctic Leopard	86	-14
Stage 7	1	(Spain) Jordi Juvanteny	MAN	22		1	(Spain) Jordi Juvanteny	MAN	122	
Stage 7	2	(Spain) Fran Gómez Pallas	Arctic Leopard	20	-2	2	(Argentina) Benjamin Pascual	Segway	115	-7
Stage 7	3	(Spain) Miguel Puertas	Arctic Leopard	20	-2	3	(Spain) Fran Gómez Pallas	Arctic Leopard	106	-16
Stage 8	1	(Spain) Jordi Juvanteny	MAN	30		1	(Spain) Jordi Juvanteny	MAN	152	
Stage 8	2	(Spain) Fran Gómez Pallas	Arctic Leopard	25	-5	2	(Spain) Fran Gómez Pallas	Arctic Leopard	131	-21
Stage 8	3	(Spain) Esther Merino	Arctic Leopard	15	-15	3	(Argentina) Benjamin Pascual	Segway	130	-22
Stage 9	1	(Argentina) Benjamin Pascual	Segway	20		1	(Spain) Jordi Juvanteny	MAN	167	
Stage 9	2	(Spain) Fran Gómez Pallas	Arctic Leopard	20	0	2	(Spain) Fran Gómez Pallas	Arctic Leopard	151	-16
Stage 9	3	(China) Jie Yang	Segway	20	0	3	(Argentina) Benjamin Pascual	Segway	150	-17
Stage 10	1	(Spain) Fran Gómez Pallas	Arctic Leopard	20		1	(Spain) Jordi Juvanteny	MAN	182	
Stage 10	2	(Spain) Esther Merino	Arctic Leopard	20	0	2	(Spain) Fran Gómez Pallas	Arctic Leopard	171	-11
Stage 10	3	(Spain) Jordi Juvanteny	MAN	15	-5	3	(Argentina) Benjamin Pascual	Segway	165	-17
Stage 11	1	(Spain) Jordi Juvanteny	MAN	20		1	(Spain) Jordi Juvanteny	MAN	202	
Stage 11	2	(Spain) Fran Gómez Pallas	Arctic Leopard	20	0	2	(Spain) Fran Gómez Pallas	Arctic Leopard	191	-11
Stage 11	3	(Spain) Esther Merino	Arctic Leopard	20	0	3	(Argentina) Benjamin Pascual	Segway	180	-22
Stage 12	1	(Spain) Esther Merino	Arctic Leopard	20		1	(Spain) Jordi Juvanteny	MAN	217	
Stage 12	2	(Spain) Fran Gómez Pallas	Arctic Leopard	20	0	2	(Spain) Fran Gómez Pallas	Arctic Leopard	211	-6
Stage 12	3	(Spain) Miguel Puertas	Arctic Leopard	20	0	3	(Argentina) Benjamin Pascual	Segway	189	-28
Stage 13	1	(Argentina) Benjamin Pascual	Segway	20		1	(Spain) Jordi Juvanteny	MAN	237	
Stage 13	2	(Spain) Jordi Juvanteny	MAN	20	0	2	(Spain) Fran Gómez Pallas	Arctic Leopard	231	-6
Stage 13	3	(China) Yi Guanghui	Segway	20	0	3	(Argentina) Benjamin Pascual	Segway	209	-28

== Final standings ==
=== Bikes ===
Final standings (positions 1–10)
Rank	Rider	Bike	Time	Difference
1	(Argentina) Luciano Benavides	KTM 450 Rally Factory	49:00:41	
2	(United States) Ricky Brabec	Honda CRF 450	49:00:43	+00:00:02
3	(Spain) Tosha Schareina	Honda CRF 450	49:25:53	+00:25:12
4	(United States) Skyler Howes	Honda CRF 450	49:57:22	+00:56:41
5	(Australia) Daniel Sanders	KTM 450 Rally Factory	50:03:56	+01:03:15
6	(France) Adrien Van Beveren	Honda CRF 450	50:05:27	+01:04:46
7	(Chile) José Ignacio Cornejo	Hero 450 Rally	50:40:31	+01:39:50
8	(Botswana) Ross Branch	Hero 450 Rally	51:49:56	+02:49:15
9	(Slovenia) Toni Mulec	KTM 450 Rally Factory Replica	51:57:59	+02:57:18
10	(United States) Preston Campbell	Honda CRF 450	52:02:36	+03:01:55

==== Rally2 Bikes ====
The Rally2 class for bikes refers to Rally2 entries eligible for the FIM World Rally-Raid Cup.

Final standings (positions 1–10)
Rank	Rider	Bike	Time	Difference
1	(Slovenia) Toni Mulec	KTM 450 Rally Factory Replica	51:57:59	
2	(United States) Preston Campbell	Honda CRF 450	52:02:36	+00:04:37
3	(Portugal) Martim Ventura	Honda CRF 450	53:35:14	+01:37:15
4	(Poland) Konrad Dąbrowski	KTM 450 Rally Factory Replica	54:20:39	+02:22:40
5	(Lithuania) Nerimantas Jucius	Honda CRF 450	54:36:02	+02:38:03
6	(Mongolia) Khaliunbold Erdenebileg	KTM 450 Rally Factory Replica	54:43:42	+02:45:43
7	(Portugal) Bruno Santos	Husqvarna 450 Rally Factory Replica	55:23:15	+03:25:16
8	(France) Benjamin Melot	KTM 450 Rally Factory Replica	55:48:52	+03:50:53
9	(Spain) Josep Pedró	Husqvarna 450 Rally Replica	56:03:24	+04:05:25
10	(Czech Republic) Milan Engel	Kove 450 Rally	56:04:22	+04:06:23

==== Original by Motul ====
The Original by Motul class, also known as the Malle Moto class, refers to bikes and quads competitors competing without any kind of assistance. The organizers provide 1 trunk per competitor for storage of the personal belongings, spare parts and tools. Competitors are only allowed to bring 1 headlight, 1 set of wheels, 1 set of tyres, 1 tent with sleeping bag and mattress, 1 travel bag and 1x 25 liter (6.6 gallon) backpack. Organizers allow free use of the generators, compressors and tool-boxes in the bivouac.

Final standings (positions 1–10)
Rank	Rider	Bike	Time	Difference
1	(France) Benjamin Melot	KTM 450 Rally Factory Replica	55:48:52	
2	(Spain) Josep Pedró	Husqvarna 450 Rally Replica	56:03:24	+00:14:32
3	(Belgium) Jérôme Martiny	Honda CRF 450	57:13:35	+01:24:43
4	(Romania) Emanuel Gyenes	KTM 450 Rally Factory Replica	59:20:47	+03:31:55
5	(Spain) Javier Vega	Kove 450 Rally	60:16:13	+04:27:21
6	(Germany) Maxi Schek	KTM 450 Rally Factory Replica	60:52:43	+05:03:51
7	(Czech Republic) David Pabiška	KTM 450 Rally Factory Replica	62:29:00	+06:40:08
8	(Italy) Tiziano Interno	KTM 450 Rally Factory Replica	63:29:19	+07:40:27
9	(France) Florian Bancilhon	KTM 450 Rally Factory Replica	63:38:01	+07:49:09
10	(Italy) Andrea Gava	Kove 450 Rally	63:47:37	+07:58:45

=== Cars ===
Final standings (positions 1–10)
Rank	Driver	Co-Driver	Car	Time	Difference
1	(Qatar) Nasser Al-Attiyah	(Belgium) Fabian Lurquin	Dacia Sandrider	48:56:53	
2	(Spain) Nani Roma	(Spain) Alex Haro	Ford Raptor	49:06:35	+00:09:42
3	(Sweden) Mattias Ekström	(Sweden) Emil Bergkvist	Ford Raptor	49:11:26	+00:14:33
4	(France) Sébastien Loeb	(France) Edouard Boulanger	Dacia Sandrider	49:12:03	+00:15:10
5	(Spain) Carlos Sainz	(Spain) Lucas Cruz	Ford Raptor	49:25:23	+00:28:30
6	(France) Mathieu Serradori	(France) Loïc Minaudier	Century CR7	49:41:55	+00:45:02
7	(Brazil) Lucas Moraes	(Germany) Dennis Zenz	Dacia Sandrider	49:44:43	+00:47:50
8	(Australia) Toby Price	(Spain) Armand Monleon	Toyota Hilux GR	49:49:00	+00:52:07
9	(United States) Seth Quintero	(United States) Andrew Short	Toyota Hilux GR	50:11:55	+01:15:02
10	(South Africa) Saood Variawa	(France) François Cazalet	Toyota Hilux IMT EVO	50:20:29	+01:23:36

=== Stock ===
Final standings (positions 1–7)
Rank	Driver	Co-Driver	Car	Time	Difference
1	(Lithuania) Rokas Baciuška	(Spain) Oriol Vidal	Defender Dakar D7X-R	58:09:45	
2	(United States) Sara Price	(United States) Sean Berriman	Defender Dakar D7X-R	62:07:45	+03:58:00
3	(France) Ronald Basso	(France) Julien Menard	Toyota Land Cruiser GR Sport	66:44:14	+08:34:29
4	(France) Stéphane Peterhansel	(France) Michaël Metge	Defender Dakar D7X-R	96:25:55	+38:16:10
5	(Japan) Akira Miura	(France) Jean-Michel Polato	Toyota Land Cruiser GR Sport	145:52:44	+87:42:59
6	(Hungary) Peter Hamza	(Austria) Andras Kalmar	Nissan Patrol	201:13:11	+143:03:26
7	(Saudi Arabia) Majed Al-Thunayan	(Saudi Arabia) Hani Al-Noumesi	Nissan Patrol	267:22:02	+209:12:17

=== Challenger (T3) ===
Final standings (positions 1–10)
Rank	Driver	Co-Driver	Car	Time	Difference
1	(Spain) Pau Navarro	(Spain) Jan Rosa	Taurus T3 Max	54:46:21	
2	(Saudi Arabia) Yasir Seaidan	(France) Xavier Flick	Taurus EVO Max	55:09:43	+00:23:22
3	(Argentina) Nicolás Cavigliasso	(Argentina) Valen Pertegarini	Taurus EVO Max	55:22:13	+00:35:52
4	(Chile) Lucas del Rio	(Argentina) Bruno Jacomy	Taurus T3 Max	55:23:30	+00:37:09
5	(Netherlands) Puck Klaassen	(Argentina) Augusto Sanz	GRallyteam G-Ecko	55:40:33	+00:54:12
6	(Chile) Ignacio Casale	(Brazil) Carlos Sachs	Taurus T3 Max	56:40:41	+01:54:20
7	(Argentina) Kevin Benavides	(Argentina) Lisandro Sisterna	Taurus T3 Max	57:19:11	+02:32:50
8	(Saudi Arabia) Dania Akeel	(France) Sébastien Delaunay	Taurus T3 Max	57:22:26	+02:36:50
9	(Netherlands) Paul Spierings	(Netherlands) Jan Pieter van der Stelt	Taurus EVO Max	57:59:07	+03:12:46
10	(Argentina) David Zille	(Argentina) Sebastian Cesana	Taurus T3 Max	58:14:46	+03:28:25

=== SSV (T4) ===
Final standings (positions 1–10)
Rank	Driver	Co-Driver	Car	Time	Difference
1	(United States) Brock Heger	(United States) Max Eddy	Polaris RZR Pro R	55:11:56	
2	(United States) Kyle Chaney	(United States) Jacob Argubright	BRP Can-Am Maverick R	56:13:35	+01:01:39
3	(France) Xavier de Soultrait	(France) Martin Bonnet	Polaris RZR Pro R	56:37:21	+01:25:25
4	(Portugal) Joao Monteiro	(Portugal) Nuno Morais	BRP Can-Am Maverick R	57:39:21	+02:27:25
5	(Argentina) Jeremías Gonzalez Ferioli	(Argentina) Gonzalo Rinaldi	BRP Can-Am Maverick R	58:02:40	+02:50:44
6	(Chile) Francisco López Contardo	(Chile) Álvaro Leon	BRP Can-Am Maverick R	58:10:50	+02:58:54
7	(Argentina) Manuel Andújar	(Argentina) Andres Frini	BRP Can-Am Maverick R	58:49:33	+03:37:37
8	(Sweden) Johan Kristoffersson	(Norway) Ola Fløene	Polaris RZR Pro R	59:12:20	+04:00:24
9	(Poland) Maciej Oleksowicz	(Poland) Marcin Sienkiewicz	BRP Can-Am Maverick R	63:56:50	+08:44:54
10	(France) Gauthier Honvault	(France) Delphine Delfino	BRP Can-Am Maverick R	64:27:48	+09:15:52

=== Trucks ===
Final standings (positions 1–10)
Rank	Driver	Co-Driver	Technician	Truck	Time	Difference
1	(Lithuania) Vaidotas Žala	(Portugal) Paulo Fiuza	(Netherlands) Max van Grol	Iveco PowerStar	56:58:38	
2	(Czech Republic) Aleš Loprais	(Czech Republic) David Kripal	(Czech Republic) Jiri Stross	Iveco PowerStar	57:18:56	+00:20:18
3	(Netherlands) Mitchel van den Brink	(Netherlands) Bart van Heun	(Netherlands) Jarno van de Pol	Iveco PowerStar	57:27:41	+00:29:03
4	(Czech Republic) Martin Macík	(Czech Republic) František Tomášek	(Czech Republic) David Svanda	MM Technology Iveco Dakar EVO4	61:34:44	+04:36:06
5	(Netherlands) Richard de Groot	(Netherlands) Martijn van Rooij	(Netherlands) Jan Hulsebosch	Iveco PowerStar	62:11:46	+05:13:08
6	(Czech Republic) Michal Valtr	(Czech Republic) Lukas Kvasnica	(Czech Republic) Radim Kaplanek	Iveco PowerStar	63:16:57	+06:18:19
7	(Netherlands) Kay Huzink	(Netherlands) Rob Buursen	(Netherlands) Gerrit Schoneveld	Renault C460 EVO 4	63:17:34	+06:18:56
8	(Netherlands) Martin van den Brink	(Belgium) Peter Willemsen	(Netherlands) Rijk Mouw	Iveco PowerStar	64:40:45	+07:42:07
9	(Italy) Claudio Bellina	(Italy) Marco Arnoletti	(Italy) Bruno Gotti	MM Technology Iveco Dakar EVO4	71:38:21	+14:39:43
10	(Netherlands) Marnix Leeuw	(Netherlands) Marco Siemons	(Netherlands) Bert van Donkelaar	Iveco PowerStar	73:53:15	+16:54:37

=== Classics ===
Final standings (positions 1–10)
Rank	Driver	Co-Driver	Technician	Vehicle	Points	Difference
1	(Lithuania) Karolis Raišys	(France) Christophe Marques	No technician	Land Rover Defender	735	
2	(Czech Republic) Ondrej Klymciw	(Czech Republic) Josef Broz	No technician	Mitsubishi Pajero	1003	+268
3	(Italy) Josef Unterholzner	(Italy) Franco Gaioni	No technician	Mitsubishi Pajero	1137	+402
4	(Italy) Marco Ernesto Leva	(Italy) Alexia Giugni	No technician	Mitsubishi Pajero	1230	+495
5	(Indonesia) Julian Johan	(France) Mathieu Monplaisi	No technician	Toyota HDJ 100	1357	+622
6	(Poland) Mariusz Pietrzycki	(Poland) Kamil Jablonski	No technician	Toyota HDJ 80	1377	+642
7	(Indonesia) Shammie Baridwan	(Lithuania) Ignas Daunoravičius	No technician	Toyota HZJ 78	1393	+658
8	(Italy) Francesco Pece	(Italy) Simona Morosi	No technician	Nissan Terrano	1513	+778
9	(Poland) Tomasz Białkowski	(Poland) Dariusz Baskiewicz	(Poland) Adam Grodzki	DAF Bull	1553	+818
10	(Germany) Jörg Sand	(Netherlands) Onno den Boer	No technician	Mercedes Classe G	1615	+880

=== Mission 1000 ===
Final standings (positions 1–7)
Rank	Driver	Co-Driver	Technician	Vehicle	Points	Difference
1	(Spain) Jordi Juvanteny	(Spain) José Luis Criado	(Spain) Xavier Ribas	MAN TGA	237	
2	(Spain) Fran Gómez Pallas	No co-driver	No technician	Arctic Leopard EXE 880 Rally	231	-6
3	(Argentina) Benjamin Pascual	No co-driver	No technician	Segway	209	-28
4	(Spain) Esther Merino	No co-driver	No technician	Arctic Leopard EXE 880 Rally	208	-29
5	(Spain) Miguel Puertas	No co-driver	No technician	Arctic Leopard EXE 880 Rally	200	-37
6	(China) Yi Guanghui	No co-driver	No technician	Segway	197	-40
7	(China) Jie Yang	No co-driver	No technician	Segway	193	-44
