= 2011 Silk Way Rally =

Seasons
- ← 2010 2012 →

The 2011 Silk Way Rally is the third running of the event. The event started in Moscow, Russia, on July 10, and ran through Russia to finish in Sochi on July 16.

== Stages ==
Stage	Date	Depart	Arrive			Cars	Trucks
Stage	Date	Depart	Arrive	Km	SS	Winner	Winner
1	10 July	(Russia) Moscow	(Russia) Lipetsk	260,57	572,75	(Russia) Alexander Zheludov	(Russia) Eduard Nikolajev
2	11 July	(Russia) Lipetsk	(Russia) Volgograd	483,68	849,69	(France) Stéphane Peterhansel	(Russia) Firdaus Kabirov
3	12 July	(Russia) Volgograd	(Russia) Astrakhan	431,51	589	(Poland) Krzysztof Holowczyc	(Russia) Ayrat Mardeev
4	13 July	(Russia) Astrakhan	(Russia) Astrakhan	399,53	419,67	(France) Stéphane Peterhansel	(Czech Republic) Aleš Loprais
5	14 July	(Russia) Astrakhan	(Russia) Stavropol	689,13	764,94	(Poland) Krzysztof Holowczyc	(Russia) Firdaus Kabirov
6	15 July	(Russia) Stavropol	(Russia) Maykop	167,82	424,65	(Russia) Vladimir Vasiljev	(Russia) Ayrat Mardeev
7	16 July	(Russia) Maykop	(Russia) Sochi	16,23	360,62	Stage cancelled	Stage cancelled
Total				3981,32	2448,47	(Poland) Krzysztof Holowczyc	(Czech Republic) Aleš Loprais

=== Final standings ===
==== Cars ====
Pos.	Driver	Navigator	Make	Time	Difference
1	Krzysztof Holowczyc (POL)	Jean-Marc Fortin (BEL)	BMW	29h 11' 27"	+ 00' 00"
2	Stéphane Peterhansel (FRA)	Jean-Paul Cottret (FRA)	Mini	?	+ 1h 59' 28"
3	Alexander Zheludov (RUS)	Andrey Rundnitski (BLR)	Nissan	51h 49' 11"	+ 3h 24' 33"
4	Vadim Nestreychuk (UKR)	Laurent Lichtleucher (FRA)	Mitsubishi	?	+ 3h 58' 13"
5	Alexander Mironenko (RUS)	Sergey Lebedev (RUS)	BMW	?	+ 4h 20' 58"

==== Trucks ====
Pos.	Driver	Navigator	Mechanic	Make	Time	Difference
1	Aleš Loprais (CZE)	Vojtěch Štajf (CZE)	Milan Holáň (CZE)	Tatra	32h 23' 15"	+ 00' 00"
2	Firdaus Kabirov (RUS)	Andrey Mokeev (RUS)	Anatolij Tanin (RUS)	Kamaz	32h 39' 56"	+ 16' 41"
3	Andrey Karginov (RUS)	Viatcheslav Mizyukaev (RUS)	Igor Děvjatkin (RUS)	Kamaz	33h 01' 51"	+ 38' 36"
4	Hans Stacey (NLD)	Peter Willemsen (BEL)	Bernard der Kinderen (NLD)	Iveco	33h 25' 45"	+ 1h 02' 30"
5	Ayrat Mardeev (RUS)	Aydar Belyaev (RUS)	Anton Mirnyj (RUS)	Kamaz	34h 30' 24"	+ 2h 07' 09"
