= 2016 Dakar Rally =

Off-road motorsport event in Argentina and Bolivia

Part of the Dakar Rally
← Previous event	Next event →
- 2016 Dakar route
- Host country: Argentina and Bolivia
- Dates run: 2–16 January 2016
- Start: (Argentina) Buenos Aires
- Finish: (Argentina) Buenos Aires
- Stages: 14
- Stage surface: Gravel, dirt, sand
- Overall distance: 9,237.00 km (5,739.61 mi)

Results
- Bikes winner: (Australia) Toby Price (Austria) Red Bull KTM Factory Racing
- Quads winner: (Argentina) Marcos Patronelli (Japan) Yamaha Racing
- Cars winner: (France) Stéphane Peterhansel (France) Jean-Paul Cottret (France) Team Peugeot Total
- Trucks winner: (Netherlands) Gerard de Rooy (Spain) Moi Torrallardona (Poland) Darek Rodewald (Italy) Iveco
- Crews: 354 at start, 215 at finish

The 2016 Dakar Rally was the 38th edition of the event and the eighth successive year that the event was held in South America. The event started in Buenos Aires, Argentina on January 2, then ran through Argentina and Bolivia.

Sébastien Loeb and Mikko Hirvonen made their debuts in rally-raid, driving for Peugeot and MINI respectively.

The victory in cars category was contested in court by runner-up X-Raid Team.

== History ==
ASO soon faced problems planning the 2016 rally. Chile refused to take the rally, the first time since Dakar is being held in South America, and then, with just 4 months to the start, Peru also refused to take the rally. Without Atacama Desert and Andes, the rally was mainly based in Argentina with many fast stages on closed narrow tracks WRC style, and a lack of stages in full open terrain with heavy navigation issues.

The biggest issue that the competitors faced was the weather phenomenon El Niño which shortened most of the stages due to heavy rain (in first week) and massive heat (in the second one). All these problems led to a big criticism and made Dakar director Étienne Lavigne announce a possible change of the rally to Southern Africa, aiming to put pressure on South American countries. Later, he would announce that the rally would remain in South America, and was looking for new countries.

The rally was won by 2015 rookie Toby Price, continuing the KTM dominance, with Honda still suffering from a lack of reliability. Patronelli brothers dominated in Quads (this time by Marcus), while Peugeot returned with a better car than the rivals, as the Peugeot 2008 DKR led from the first real stage until the end of the rally. The debutant Sébastien Loeb dominated the first week, but in the end, the victory went to Mr. Dakar Stephane Peterhansel. Gerard de Rooy won the Dakar again, putting an end to Kamaz dominance.

Honda placed behind KTM in the rally. A margin existed between the performance of Mini and the new Peugeot, and the Toyota entries placed behind their competitors. Following previous wins in the Dakar races, Kamaz did not hold the lead.

=== Controversies ===
After the problems that the organization suffered to put 2016 Dakar Rally on track, the rally was marked by the crash of a Chinese businesswoman from the pharmaceutical industry who bought a place in the X-Raid team. Ten people were injured, two of them seriously. This led to a discussion of whether the toughest rally race in the world should be open to anyone who has a sports license, without any other criteria.

Most of the following stages were modified due to rain or heat which caused the competitive sectors to be shortened. In addition to the discussion regarding the need for the cancellations, the most controversy was generated by the [apparent] double standards of the organization. In stage seven, the ASO decided to cancel the second timed sector, although 22 riders had already reached the finish line, with all bike and quad riders staying within the time of the first sector. In stage 9, there was another cancellation of the second timed sector when 12 bike riders had already finished. But this time ASO initially considered the time of the first sector, and then changed the stage classification, with the time at the end of the second sector for those 12 riders who finished and assigning the remaining riders a theoretical time of 34 minutes more than the first contestant. Then at the end of the next stage, the penalty to Paulo Gonçalves for repairing his bike in the previous stage was given and taken away. He was out of the race because his bike broke at the end of the first sector, but when the second sector was canceled, he was again in the race. Then more than 24 hours later, he received a penalty for repairing the bike after the second sector.

This Dakar was also marked by several accidents involving assistance trucks, causing some deaths among the local population. The reason given by the crews was the lack of sleep since in most of the stages they had to drive for about 20 hours between bivouacs.

The most controversial moment was reserved for the finish with X-Raid appealing to the French Sports Court, claiming Stephane Peterhansel had an illegal refuel in stage 8, leaving the victory decision to be taken in the court. In stage 8, Peterhansel took advantage of a neutralized section and started the race with less fuel, refueling in the neutralized section. X-Raid immediately contested the decision, since several drivers such as Nasser Al-Aiyah or even Sainz and Loeb had to reduce the pace in order to save some fuel, due to the extension of the stage, but ASO stewards acquitted Peterhansel.

== Entries ==
Number of participants
Stage	Bikes	Quads	Cars	Trucks	Total
Start of Rally	136	45	111	55	347
Rest Day	112	36	90	51	289
End of Rally	84 (61%)	23 (51%)	67 (60%)	41 (75%)	215 (62%)

=== Bikes ===
Leading Entries
Manufacturer	No.	Rider
(Austria) KTM	3	(Australia) Toby Price
(Austria) KTM	5	(Slovakia) Štefan Svitko
(Austria) KTM	9	(France) David Casteu
(Austria) KTM	10	(France) Olivier Pain
(Austria) KTM	11	(Spain) Jordi Viladoms
(Austria) KTM	12	(Spain) Laia Sanz
(Austria) KTM	14	(Austria) Matthias Walkner
(Austria) KTM	25	(United Kingdom) Sam Sunderland
(Austria) KTM	36	(Bolivia) Juan Carlos Salvatierra
(Japan) Honda	2	(Portugal) Paulo Gonçalves
(Japan) Honda	6	(Spain) Joan Barreda
(Japan) Honda	19	(France) Michael Metge
(Japan) Honda	22	(Argentina) Javier Pizzolito
(Japan) Honda	47	(Argentina) Kevin Benavides
(Japan) Yamaha	7	(Portugal) Hélder Rodrigues
(Japan) Yamaha	15	(Netherlands) Frans Verhoeven
(Japan) Yamaha	18	(Italy) Alessandro Botturi
(Sweden) Husqvarna	4	(Chile) Pablo Quintanilla
(Sweden) Husqvarna	8	(Portugal) Ruben Faria
(France) Sherco	17	(Spain) Juan Pedrero
(France) Sherco	20	(France) Alain Duclos

=== Cars ===
Leading Entries
Car	No.	Driver	Co-driver
(United States) Ford	320	(Spain) Xavier Pons	(Argentina) Ricardo Torlaschi
(France) Peugeot	302	(France) Stéphane Peterhansel	(France) Jean-Paul Cottret
(France) Peugeot	303	(Spain) Carlos Sainz	(Spain) Lucas Cruz
(France) Peugeot	314	(France) Sébastien Loeb	(Monaco) Daniel Elena
(France) Peugeot	321	(France) Cyril Despres	(France) David Castera
(France) Peugeot	328	(France) Romain Dumas	(France) François Borsotto
(United Kingdom) Mini	300	(Qatar) Nasser Al-Attiyah	(France) Matthieu Baumel
(United Kingdom) Mini	304	(Spain) Nani Roma	(Spain) Alex Haro
(United Kingdom) Mini	306	(Netherlands) Erik Van Loon	(Netherlands) Wouter Rosegaar
(United Kingdom) Mini	310	(Argentina) Orlando Terranova	(Argentina) Bernardo Graue
(United Kingdom) Mini	315	(Finland) Mikko Hirvonen	(France) Michel Périn
(United Kingdom) Mini	325	(Poland) Adam Malysz	(France) Xavier Panseri
(Japan) Toyota	301	(South Africa) Giniel de Villiers	(Germany) Dirk von Zitzewitz
(Japan) Toyota	305	(Saudi Arabia) Yazeed Al-Rajhi	(Germany) Timo Gottschalk
(Japan) Toyota	307	(Russia) Vladimir Vasilyev	(Russia) Konstantin Zhiltsov
(Japan) Toyota	311	(Netherlands) Bernhard ten Brinke	(Belgium) Tom Colsoul
(Japan) Toyota	316	(France) Ronan Chabot	(France) Gilles Pillot
(Japan) Toyota	322	(Poland) Marek Dabrowski	(Poland) Jacek Czachor
(Japan) Toyota	329	(Czech Republic) Martin Prokop	(Czech Republic) Jan Tománek
(Japan) Toyota	333	(Lithuania) Benediktas Vanagas	(Poland) Sebastian Rozwadowski
(Japan) Toyota	366	(Lithuania) Antanas Juknevičius	(Lithuania) Mindaugas Slapšys

=== Quads ===
Leading Entries
Manufacturer	No.	Rider
(Japan) Yamaha	250	(Poland) Rafał Sonik
(Japan) Yamaha	251	(Chile) Ignacio Casale
(Japan) Yamaha	252	(Argentina) Marcos Patronelli
(Japan) Yamaha	253	(Argentina) Alejandro Patronelli
(Japan) Yamaha	254	(Argentina) Jeremias González
(Japan) Yamaha	264	(Russia) Sergey Karyakin
(Japan) Yamaha	265	(Peru) Alexis Hernández
(Japan) Honda	255	(Qatar) Mohammed Abu-Issa
(Japan) Honda	266	(Argentina) Sebastián Palma
(Japan) Honda	267	(Argentina) Lucas Bonetto
(Canada) Can-Am	258	(Argentina) Daniel Mazzuco
(Canada) Can-Am	260	(Italy) Franco Picco

=== Trucks ===
Leading Entries
Manufacturer	No.	Driver	Co-Drivers	
(Russia) Kamaz	500	(Russia) Ayrat Mardeev	(Russia) Aydar Belyaev	(Russia) Dmitriy Svistunov
(Russia) Kamaz	502	(Russia) Eduard Nikolaev	(Russia) Evgeny Yakovlev	(Russia) Vladimir Rybakov
(Russia) Kamaz	504	(Russia) Andrey Karginov	(Russia) Andrey Mokeev	(Russia) Igor Leonov
(Russia) Kamaz	508	(Russia) Dmitry Sotnikov	(Russia) Igor Devyatkin	(Russia) Ruslan Akhamadeev
(Italy) Iveco	501	(Netherlands) Gerard de Rooy	(Spain) Moi Torrallardona	(Poland) Darek Rodewald
(Italy) Iveco	503	(Czech Republic) Aleš Loprais	(Spain) Ferran Alcayna	(Netherlands) Bernard der Kinderen
(Italy) Iveco	514	(Argentina) Federico Villagra	(Argentina) Jorge Perez Companc	(Argentina) Andres Memi
(Italy) Iveco	516	(Netherlands) Ton van Genugten	(Netherlands) Anton van Limpt	(Netherlands) Peter van Eerd
(Italy) Iveco	518	(Spain) Pep Vila	(Spain) Xavi Colome	(Spain) Marc Torres Sala
(Germany) MAN	506	(Netherlands) Hans Stacey	(Belgium) Serge Bruynkens	(Belgium) Jan van der Vaet
(Czech Republic) Tatra	505	(Czech Republic) Martin Kolomý	(Czech Republic) David Kilián	(Czech Republic) René Kilián
(Czech Republic) Tatra	533	(Czech Republic) Jaroslav Valtr	(Czech Republic) Josef Kalina	(Czech Republic) Jiří Štross
(Netherlands) Ginaf	520	(Netherlands) Jan Lammers	(Netherlands) Emiel Megens	(Netherlands) Erik Kofma
(Belarus) MAZ	507	(Belarus) Siarhei Viazovich	(Belarus) Pavel Haranin	(Belarus) Andrei Zhyulin

== Stages ==
Distance according to the official website.

Stage	Date	Depart	Arrive	Bikes			Quads	Cars			Trucks		
Stage	Date	Depart	Arrive	Km	SS	Winner	Winner	Km	SS	Winner	Km	SS	Winner
P	2 January	(Argentina) Buenos Aires	(Argentina) Rosario	346	11	(Spain) J. Barreda	(Chile) I. Casale	346	11	(Netherlands) B. Ten Brinke	346	~~11~~	Stage neutralized
1	3 January	(Argentina) Rosario	(Argentina) Villa Carlos Paz	632	~~227~~	Stage cancelled due to bad weather		662	~~258~~	Stage cancelled	662	~~258~~	Stage cancelled
2	4 January	(Argentina) Villa Carlos Paz	(Argentina) Termas de Río Hondo	786	~~450~~; 354	(Australia) T. Price	(Chile) I. Casale	858	~~521~~; 387	(France) S. Loeb	858	~~521~~; 387	(Netherlands) P. Versluis (Note: Hans Stacey set the fastest time for the stage before being awarded a 2-minute penalty.)
3	5 January	(Argentina) Termas de Río Hondo	(Argentina) San Salvador de Jujuy	663	~~314~~; 200	(Argentina) K. Benavides (Note: Joan Barreda set the fastest time for the stage before being awarded 1-minute penalty for speeding.)	(South Africa) B. Baragwanath	663	~~314~~; 200	(France) S. Loeb	663	~~314~~; 130	(Czech Republic) M. Kolomy
4^{M}	6 January	(Argentina) San Salvador de Jujuy	(Argentina) San Salvador de Jujuy	629	429	(Portugal) P. Gonçalves (Note: Joan Barreda set the fastest time for the stage before being awarded a 5-minute penalty for speeding again.)	(Peru) A. Hernández (Note: Marcus Patronelli initially won the stage but after the organization annulled the last timed sector)	629	429	(France) S. Peterhansel	619	418	(Netherlands) G. Rooy
5	7 January	(Argentina) San Salvador de Jujuy	(Bolivia) Uyuni	624	327	(Australia) T. Price	(Peru) A. Hernández	624	327	(France) S. Loeb	624	327	(Russia) E. Nikolaev
6	8 January	(Bolivia) Uyuni	(Bolivia) Uyuni	723	542	(Australia) T. Price	(Argentina) M. Patronelli	723	542	(France) S. Peterhansel	600	295	(Netherlands) H. Stacey
7	9 January	(Bolivia) Uyuni	(Argentina) Salta	793	~~353~~; 230	(France) A. Méo	(Argentina) L. Bonetto	793	353	(Spain) C. Sainz	793	353	(Russia) E. Nikolaev
	10 January	(Argentina) Salta		Rest Day									
8	11 January	(Argentina) Salta	(Argentina) Belén	766	393	(Australia) T. Price	(Argentina) M. Patronelli	766	393	(Qatar) N. Al-Attiyah	766	393	(Netherlands) G. Rooy
9	12 January	(Argentina) Belén	(Argentina) Belén	436^{M}	285^{M}	(Australia) T. Price	(Argentina) P. Copetti	396	285	(Spain) C. Sainz	396	285	(Netherlands) G. Rooy
10	13 January	(Argentina) Belén	(Argentina) La Rioja	561	278	(Slovakia) Š. Svitko	(South Africa) B. Baragwanath	763	278	(France) S. Peterhansel	763	431	(Netherlands) P. Baar
11	14 January	(Argentina) La Rioja	(Argentina) San Juan	712	431	(France) A. Méo	(Argentina) A. Patronelli	712	431	(Qatar) N. Al-Attiyah	712	431	(Russia) E. Nikolaev
12	15 January	(Argentina) San Juan	(Argentina) Villa Carlos Paz	931	481	(Portugal) H. Rodrigues	(Argentina) M. Patronelli	866	481	(Finland) M. Hirvonen	866	267	(Netherlands) P. Versluis
13	16 January	(Argentina) Villa Carlos Paz	(Argentina) Rosario	699	180	(Chile) P. Quintanilla	(South Africa) B. Baragwanath	699	180	(France) S. Loeb	699	180	(Netherlands) H. Stacey

Notes:

- M: Marathon Stage (without assistance park).
- Prologue neutralized after car accident, preventing trucks to run.
- Stage 1 cancelled due to bad weather.
- Stage 2 shortened due to bad weather.
- Stage 3 shortened due to bad weather. The trucks stage was then neutralized after second waypoint due to track abatement.
- Stage 7 shortened for bikes and quads due to bad weather (second timed sector cancelled).
- Stage 9 and 11 shortened due to massive heat.
- Stage 10 shortened due to high water river.

== Summary ==
The race started with an 11 km prologue in Buenos Aires, marked by an accident when a car driver went through the spectators injuring 10 people, with the organization neutralizing the race for the remaining competitors. The first "real" stage was cancelled due to bad weather. Due to the same reason, the second and third stages were shortened about 100 km. The third stage for trucks was shortened a second time after a part of the track collapsed due to the heavy rain. The fourth and fifth stages were the two legs of 2016 Dakar first Marathon stage, with the innovation this year of vehicles entering a closed park at the end of the first leg, with the competitors being unable to do repair and maintenance work, even without assistance. Stage 7 was one of the most dramatic. First, the return to Argentina and El Niño, cancelling the second time sector for Bikes and Quads. Then of Matthias Walkner's serious accident and the crash of Lionel Baud's Mitsubishi, killing one spectator in Bolivia. The extreme heat led to stages 9 and 11 being shortened while the last 33 km of stage 10 was cancelled due to rain-flooded rivers.

=== Bikes ===
This was the first race without Cyril Despres and Marc Coma who had dominated the 10 previous editions. It was expected a full open race with a large group of candidates to the victory across KTM and Honda but soon Husqvarna (competing with KTM bikes) reinforced by the candidate Ruben Faria joined for the victory while Yamaha (which lost some of its most valued competitors but assisted of the return of Hélder Rodrigues) played a secondary role. Sherco was also expecting for a surprise mainly from Alain Duclos

Joan Barreda started the rally with a strong pace, as usual, and won the prologue, setting the fastest time in the 3rd and 4th stages, but was given two penalties for speeding in the connections. This led to the victory of the Argentinian rookie Kevin Benavides and the leadership of the privateer Štefan Svitko in the 3rd stage. In stage 4 a double for Portugal with Paulo Gonçalves winning the stage ahead of Ruben Faria, and securing the lead. Victories on stages 5 and 6 for KTM Toby Price but Gonçalves was still in the lead. On stage 6, an accident led to the retirement of Ruben Faria with a broken wrist when he was 7th overall, and Joan Barreda lost all the chances of winning the 2016 Dakar when mechanical problems caused a finish five hours behind Price.

In stage 7, the retirement of two victory candidates: Joan Barreda, who refused to continue after the heavy loss of time the day before, despite the bike being in good condition and Matthias Walkner, who had an accident which led to his retirement with a broken femur. Gonçalves was the first rider to arrive and stayed until the medical rescue arrived. Later the organization took out the 10,53 minutes he stayed with his rival. Antoine Méo won the stage and Gonçalves increased the lead over Toby Price. Svitko was third before the rest day.

In stage 8, another victory for Price, while Gonçalves, who suffered a spectacular accident but still took his Honda to finish second in the stage. In the next stage more problems for Gonçalves with a puncture in the heat exchanger in the second sector. He managed to pull through the bivouac, losing 30 minutes and falling to third place overall. Since it was a marathon stage (but without closed-park as stage 4), Gonçalves repaired the bike with the help of Honda teammates and the Portuguese Mário Patrão, without replacing the motor and avoiding the respective penalty. However, the organization still applied an almost 40-minute penalty at the end of stage 10, ending Gonçalves victory aspirations.

In stage 10 Price managed his huge lead and the private driver Štefan Svitko took the victory. In the following stage another dramatic day for Gonçalves. Being informed of the penalty due to stage 9, Gonçalves attack from the beginning of the stage, but soon he crashed, crashing again at km 118, and suffering a head trauma leading to his retirement. Svitko and Benavides lost time to Antoine Méo and Price.

In stage 12 the first win for a bike that was not KTM or Honda - the Hélder Rodrigues Yamaha, while stage 13 was the time of Pablo Quintanilla's Husqvarna.

=== Quads ===
2016 was the return of the Patronelli brothers, who have dominated the South American Dakar between 2010 and 2013. But it was the 2014 champion Ignacio Casale who dominated the start of the race sweeping the first stages. The rookie Brian Baragwanath was the hero of stage 3, winning after being second on stage 2. In stage 4, what could have been the first win for Marcus Patronelli was later a win for Italian, Juan Carlos Carignani, after the organisation cancelled the last timed section. The marathon's second stage leg promoted a revolution on quads ranking, with some crashes and mechanical problems leading to many withdrawals such as Marcelo Medeiros (third overall) Rafal Sonik (defending champion) and Qatari Abu-Issa. The 2014 winner, Ignacio Casale lost a huge amount of time to Alexis Hernandez, the winner of the day. The surprising Russian rider, Sergey Karyakin took the lead. In stage 6, finally, the return of Patronelli brothers, with Marcos winning ahead of Alejandro, who climbed to the top of the general classification, on the day of Casale's retirement due to a broken clavicle after a crash. In stage 7, the victory went for Lucas Bonetto, with no significant changes overall.

In the second week of the race, the Patronelli brothers finished almost all stages in the top-3 increasing their lead.

=== Cars ===
The Mini army faced the South African Toyotas and the return of Peugeot with a fully renovated 2008 DKR after the 2015 in race tests. In 2016, the Peugeot 2008 DKR dominated the race with 9 stage wins out of 12 run stages, leading from the first real stage till the end. The prologue was just a warm-up with the competitors finishing with little differences, but in the WRC style stages 2 and 3, the debutant Sébastien Loeb showed his class, in a 1-2 finish for Peugeot, despite the track being more favorable to the 4WD vehicles. In the high mountain stage 4, a 1-2-3 for Peugeot (first win for Stéphane Peterhansel with a Peugeot, its 33rd win in cars, 66th overall and 50th stage win for Peugeot) who secure also the fifth place, with just the Nasser Al-Attiyah's Mini in the middle, demonstrating the profit of 2008 DKR improvements. Fifth stage, one more win for Sébastien Loeb (his third) and one more 1-2-3 for Peugeot. In the sixth stage, another double for Peugeot with Peterhansel finishing ahead of Carlos Sainz. Loeb had to change two flat tires and lost the leadership to Peterhansel. Stage 7 and 7 wins for Peugeot, this time for Carlos Sainz. Peterhanse was 4th and lost the lead for Loeb (second on the stage). Al-Attiyah was the best non-Peugeot (third in the stage, fourth overall behind the French army). The prologue winner saw his Toyota burning to the ground and went home earlier.

After the rest day the problems started for Loeb, sticking first in the sand and then capsizing his cars in a dry river. He managed to drive to the end, but losing 1h30min. It was the first Mini victory, for Al-Attiyah, third overall, behind Peterhansel and Sainz. In stage 9 Loeb got stuck again while Peterhansel suffered a puncture. Al-Attiyah was only fifth, while Sainz won the ahead of Erick Van Loon and Hirvonen, both on Mini, and took the race lead. In stage 10 both Van Loon and Al-Attiyah capsized their Mini's while Sainz had to retire with gearbox problems. Peterhansel took the lead again, with one hour over Al-Attiyah (second) with the most difficult stages completed. in the following stage Peterhansel managed his lead, while Loeb suffered again with mechanical problems, being towed by Després, but still finishing second on the stage. Nasser Al-Attiyah had transmission problems, finishing the stage with only two driving wheels, but winning anyway. at the end of the stage, the electric car Aciona, had to retire after 11 stages, stopping at each 200 km to charge its 14.000 batteries. In stage 12 the first win for Hirvonen ahead Nasser, in the first day without a Peugeot on top-3. Loeb finish the rally as he started it: winning stage 13.

Thus, Loeb won 4 stages, Petehansel 3, Sainz 2, Al-Attiyah 2 and Hirvonen 1.

=== Trucks ===
After the dominance of Kamaz in the previous editions, it was a great surprise to see the Russian monsters in the middle of the rankings in the first stages. The race for the Dakar heavy-weights, didn't start before stage 2 (due to a car accident in Prologue which stopped the remaining competitors to race, and the cancelation of stage 1 due to bad weather). MAN dominated the first stages, with Hans Stacey setting the fastest time in stage 3, but received a 2-minutes penalty. He and his teammate Peter Versluis alternated in the leadership in the first stages. Victories for the Martin Kolomý's Tatra in stage 3 and de Rooy's Iveco in stage 4 showed the competitiveness of 2016 Dakar. Former rally driver Federico Villagra with an amazing regularity was the best Iveco (and non MAN), in third position. In stage 5, the retirement of Ales Loprais and the return of Kamaz to the victories, with Eduard Nikolaev. Villagra took the leadership, but lost some time in stage 6, and Hans Stacey took the victory and the race leadership. On stage 7 another victory for Nikolaev and his Kamaz. Stacey lost some time and fell into fifth position, while Versluis climb to first, followed by De Rooy and the two Kamaz. Villagra also had problem in the stage and fell to sixth.

De Rooy won stage 8 while Versluis, Stacey and Villagra lost much time. On stage 9 another victory for De Rooy and more problems for Versluis (only 12 on the stage). Like Peterhansel, De Rooy was very close to final victory, leading all his rivals, finishing behind the surprise Pascal de Baar Rennault's. De Rooy was one hour ahead everybody on overall.

In stage 11 De Rooy managed his lead and the stage win went for Nikolaev Kamaz. Versluis won stage 12 but he was far away from overall top-3.

== Stage results ==
=== Bikes ===
	Stage result					General classification				
Stage	Pos	Competitor	Make	Time	Gap	Pos	Competitor	Make	Time	Gap
Pro	1	(Spain) Joan Barreda	Honda	00:06:27		1	(Spain) Joan Barreda	Honda	00:06:27	
Pro	2	(Portugal) Ruben Faria	Husqvarna	00:06:27	00:00	2	(Portugal) Ruben Faria	Husqvarna	00:06:27	00:00:00
Pro	3	(Portugal) Hélder Rodrigues	Yamaha	00:06:30	00:03	3	(Portugal) Hélder Rodrigues	Yamaha	00:06:30	00:00:03
1	Stage cancelled due to bad weather									
2	1	(Australia) Toby Price	KTM	03:46:24		1	(Australia) Toby Price	KTM	03:53:09	
2	2	(Portugal) Ruben Faria	Husqvarna	03:47:44	01:20	2	(Portugal) Ruben Faria	Husqvarna	03:54:11	00:01:02
2	3	(France) Alain Duclos	Sherco	03:48:15	01:51	3	(France) Alain Duclos	Sherco	03:55:02	00:01:53
3	1	(Argentina) Kevin Benavides	Honda	02:31:03		1	(Slovakia) Štefan Svitko	KTM	06:27:04	
3	2	(Portugal) Paulo Gonçalves	Honda	02:31:29	00:26	2	(Argentina) Kevin Benavides	Honda	06:27:38	00:00:34
3	3	(France) Antoine Méo	KTM	02:31:30	00:27	3	(Spain) Joan Barreda	Honda	06:27:50	00:00:46
4	1	(Portugal) Paulo Gonçalves	Honda	04:07:19		1	(Portugal) Paulo Gonçalves	Honda	10:35:17	
4	2	(Portugal) Ruben Faria	Husqvarna	04:09:54	02:35	2	(Argentina) Kevin Benavides	Honda	10:37:34	00:02:17
4	3	(Argentina) Kevin Benavides	Honda	04:09:56	02:37	3	(Spain) Joan Barreda	Honda	10:38:20	00:03:03
5	1	(Australia) Toby Price	KTM	04:03:44		1	(Portugal) Paulo Gonçalves	Honda	14:30:07	
5	2	(France) Antoine Méo	KTM	04:06:05	02:21	2	(Slovakia) Štefan Svitko	KTM	14:31:52	00:01:45
5	3	(Slovakia) Štefan Svitko	KTM	04:06:17	02:33	3	(Australia) Toby Price	KTM	14:31:54	00:01:47
6	1	(Australia) Toby Price	KTM	05:51:48		1	(Portugal) Paulo Gonçalves	Honda	20:23:07	
6	2	(Austria) Matthias Walkner	KTM	05:52:53	01:05	2	(Australia) Toby Price	KTM	20:23:42	00:00:35
6	3	(Portugal) Paulo Gonçalves	Honda	05:53:00	01:12	3	(Austria) Matthias Walkner	KTM	20:25:57	00:02:50
7	1	(France) Antoine Méo	KTM	02:27:27		1	(Portugal) Paulo Gonçalves	Honda	22:52:30	
7	2	(Argentina) Kevin Benavides	Honda	02:29:20	01:53	2	(Australia) Toby Price	KTM	22:55:42	00:03:12
7	3	(Portugal) Paulo Gonçalves	Honda	02:29:23	01:56	3	(Slovakia) Štefan Svitko	KTM	23:01:54	00:09:24
Rest day
8	1	(Australia) Toby Price	KTM	04:33:14		1	(Australia) Toby Price	KTM	27:28:56	
8	2	(Portugal) Paulo Gonçalves	Honda	04:38:31	05:17	2	(Portugal) Paulo Gonçalves	Honda	27:31:01	00:02:05
8	3	(Chile) Pablo Quintanilla	Husqvarna	04:39:46	06:32	3	(Slovakia) Štefan Svitko	KTM	27:43:10	00:14:14
9	1	(Australia) Toby Price	KTM	03:26:58		1	(Australia) Toby Price	KTM	30:55:54	
9	2	(United States) Ricky Brabec	Honda	03:39:27	12:29	2	(Slovakia) Štefan Svitko	KTM	31:24:53	00:28:59
9	3	(France) Antoine Méo	KTM	03:40:22	13:24	3	(Portugal) Paulo Gonçalves	Honda	31:29:55	00:34:01
10	1	(Slovakia) Štefan Svitko	KTM	03:47:23		1	(Australia) Toby Price	KTM	34:49:04	
10	2	(Argentina) Kevin Benavides	Honda	03:50:17	02:54	2	(Slovakia) Štefan Svitko	KTM	35:12:16	00:23:12
10	3	(Australia) Toby Price	KTM	03:53:10	05:47	3	(Chile) Pablo Quintanilla	Husqvarna	35:31:53	00:42:49
11	1	(France) Antoine Méo	KTM	05:19:08		1	(Australia) Toby Price	KTM	40:08:30	
11	2	(Australia) Toby Price	KTM	05:19:26	00:18	2	(Slovakia) Štefan Svitko	KTM	40:43:53	00:35:23
11	3	(Chile) Pablo Quintanilla	Husqvarna	05:21:56	02:48	3	(France) Antoine Méo	KTM	40:52:16	00:43:46
12	1	(Portugal) Hélder Rodrigues	Yamaha	06:00:24		1	(Australia) Toby Price	KTM	46:13:26	
12	2	(Australia) Toby Price	KTM	06:04:56	04:32	2	(Slovakia) Štefan Svitko	KTM	46:51:05	00:37:39
12	3	(Argentina) Kevin Benavides	Honda	06:05:19	04:55	3	(Chile) Pablo Quintanilla	Husqvarna	47:06:36	00:53:10
13	1	(Chile) Pablo Quintanilla	Husqvarna	01:51:27		1	(Australia) Toby Price	KTM	48:09:15	
13	2	(Argentina) Kevin Benavides	Honda	01:53:08	01:41	2	(Slovakia) Štefan Svitko	KTM	48:48:56	00:39:41
13	3	(Portugal) Hélder Rodrigues	Yamaha	01:54:04	02:37	3	(Chile) Pablo Quintanilla	Husqvarna	48:58:03	00:48:48

=== Quads ===
	Stage result					General classification				
Stage	Pos	Competitor	Make	Time	Gap	Pos	Competitor	Make	Time	Gap
Pro	1	(Chile) Ignacio Casale	Yamaha	0:07:14		1	(Chile) Ignacio Casale	Yamaha	00:07:14	
Pro	2	(Argentina) Marcos Patronelli	Yamaha	00:07:19	00:05	2	(Argentina) Marcos Patronelli	Yamaha	00:07:19	00:00:05
Pro	3	(Argentina) Pablo Copetti	Yamaha	00:07:21	00:07	3	(Argentina) Pablo Copetti	Yamaha	00:07:21	00:00:07
1	Stage cancelled due to bad weather									
2	1	(Chile) Ignacio Casale	Yamaha	04:10:47		1	(Chile) Ignacio Casale	Yamaha	04:18:01	
2	2	(South Africa) Brian Baragwanath	Yamaha	04:14:36	03:49	2	(South Africa) Brian Baragwanath	Yamaha	04:22:01	00:04:00
2	3	(Brazil) Marcelo Medeiros	Yamaha	04:14:58	04:11	3	(Brazil) Marcelo Medeiros	Yamaha	04:22:24	00:04:23
3	1	(South Africa) Brian Baragwanath	Yamaha	02:42:35		1	(Chile) Ignacio Casale	Yamaha	07:01:40	
3	2	(Chile) Ignacio Casale	Yamaha	02:43:39	01:04	2	(South Africa) Brian Baragwanath	Yamaha	07:04:36	00:02:56
3	3	(Argentina) Lucas Bonetto	Honda	02:47:12	04:37	3	(Brazil) Marcelo Medeiros	Yamaha	07:09:38	00:07:58
4	1	(Peru) Alexis Hernandez	Yamaha	04:53:23		1	(Chile) Ignacio Casale	Yamaha	11:55:41	
4	2	(Argentina) Marcos Patronelli	Yamaha	04:53:27	00:04	2	(Brazil) Marcelo Medeiros	Yamaha	12:06:58	00:11:17
4	3	(Chile) Ignacio Casale	Yamaha	04:54:01	00:38	3	(Argentina) Alejandro Patronelli	Yamaha	12:09:49	00:14:08
5	1	(Peru) Alexis Hernandez	Yamaha	04:49:24		1	(Peru) Alexis Hernandez	Yamaha	17:00:21	
5	2	(Argentina) Alejandro Patronelli	Yamaha	04:51:20	01:56	2	(Argentina) Alejandro Patronelli	Yamaha	17:01:09	00:05:43
5	3	(Russia) Sergey Karyakin	Yamaha	04:52:14	02:50	3	(Argentina) Marcos Patronelli	Yamaha	17:10:36	00:10:15
6	1	(Argentina) Marcos Patronelli	Yamaha	06:53:39		1	(Argentina) Alejandro Patronelli	Yamaha	24:01:27	
6	2	(Argentina) Alejandro Patronelli	Yamaha	07:00:18	06:39	2	(Argentina) Marcos Patronelli	Yamaha	24:04:15	00:02:48
6	3	(Russia) Sergey Karyakin	Yamaha	07:12:40	19:01	3	(Peru) Alexis Hernandez	Yamaha	24:23:28	00:22:01
7	1	(Argentina) Lucas Bonetto	Honda	02:58:30		1	(Argentina) Alejandro Patronelli	Yamaha	27:02:31	
7	2	(Russia) Sergey Karyakin	Yamaha	02:58:56	00:26	2	(Argentina) Marcos Patronelli	Yamaha	27:06:07	00:03:36
7	3	(Argentina) Pablo Copetti	Honda	02:58:59	00:29	3	(Argentina) Jeremias González	Yamaha	27:28:34	00:26:03
Rest day
8	1	(Argentina) Marcos Patronelli	Yamaha	05:41:18		1	(Argentina) Marcos Patronelli	Yamaha	32:47:25	
8	2	(Argentina) Alejandro Patronelli	Yamaha	05:47:00	05:42	2	(Argentina) Alejandro Patronelli	Yamaha	32:49:31	00:02:06
8	3	(Peru) Alexis Hernandez	Yamaha	05:50:35	09:17	3	(Peru) Alexis Hernandez	Yamaha	33:20:15	00:32:50
9	1	(Argentina) Pablo Copetti	Yamaha	05:39:41		1	(Argentina) Marcos Patronelli	Yamaha	38:29:22	
9	2	(Argentina) Alejandro Patronelli	Yamaha	05:40:35	00:54	2	(Argentina) Alejandro Patronelli	Yamaha	38:30:06	00:00:44
9	3	(Argentina) Marcos Patronelli	Yamaha	05:41:57	02:16	3	(Peru) Alexis Hernandez	Yamaha	39:13:34	00:44:12
10	1	(South Africa) Brian Baragwanath	Yamaha	04:53:30		1	(Argentina) Marcos Patronelli	Yamaha	43:14:19	
10	2	(Argentina) Marcos Patronelli	Yamaha	04:53:59	00:29	2	(Argentina) Alejandro Patronelli	Yamaha	43:15:53	00:01:34
10	3	(Argentina) Alejandro Patronelli	Yamaha	04:54:47	01:17	3	(Argentina) Jeremías González	Yamaha	44:49:02	01:34:43
11	1	(Argentina) Alejandro Patronelli	Yamaha	06:20:15		1	(Argentina) Marcos Patronelli	Yamaha	49:36:00	
11	2	(South Africa) Brian Baragwanath	Yamaha	06:21:21	01:06	2	(Argentina) Alejandro Patronelli	Yamaha	49:36:08	00:08
11	3	(Argentina) Marcos Patronelli	Yamaha	06:21:41	01:26	3	(South Africa) Brian Baragwanath	Yamaha	51:17:15	01:41:15
12	1	(Argentina) Marcos Patronelli	Yamaha	06:48:46		1	(Argentina) Marcos Patronelli	Yamaha	56:24:46	
12	2	(Bolivia) Walter Nosiglia	Honda	06:48:55	00:09	2	(Argentina) Alejandro Patronelli	Yamaha	56:29:09	04:23
12	3	(Russia) Sergey Karyakin	Yamaha	06:49:35	00:49	3	(Russia) Sergey Karyakin	Yamaha	58:16:53	01:52:07
13	1	(South Africa) Brian Baragwanath	Yamaha	02:07:18		1	(Argentina) Marcos Patronelli	Yamaha	58:47:41	
13	2	(Argentina) Giuliano Giordana	Yamaha	02:15:02	07:44	2	(Argentina) Alejandro Patronelli	Yamaha	58:53:04	05:23
13	3	(Russia) Sergey Karyakin	Yamaha	02:15:13	07:55	3	(South Africa) Brian Baragwanath	Yamaha	60:29:34	01:41:53

=== Cars ===
	Stage result					General classification				
Stage	Pos	Competitor	Make	Time	Gap	Pos	Competitor	Make	Time	Gap
Pro	1	(Netherlands) Bernhard Ten Brinke (Belgium) Tom Colsoul	Toyota	00:06:08		1	(Netherlands) Bernhard Ten Brinke (Belgium) Tom Colsoul	Toyota	00:06:08	
Pro	2	(Spain) Carlos Sainz (Spain) Lucas Cruz	Peugeot	00:06:11	00:03	2	(Spain) Carlos Sainz (Spain) Lucas Cruz	Peugeot	00:06:11	00:00:03
Pro	3	(Spain) Xavier Pons (Argentina) Ricardo Torlaschi	Ford	00:06:12	00:04	3	(Spain) Xavier Pons (Argentina) Ricardo Torlaschi	Ford	00:06:12	00:00:04
1	Stage cancelled due to bad weather									
2	1	(France) Sébastien Loeb (Monaco) Daniel Elena	Peugeot	03:45:46		1	(France) Sébastien Loeb (Monaco) Daniel Elena	Peugeot	03:52:03	
2	2	(France) Stéphane Peterhansel (France) Jean-Paul Cottret	Peugeot	03:48:09	02:23	2	(France) Stéphane Peterhansel (France) Jean-Paul Cottret	Peugeot	03:54:26	00:02:23
2	3	(South Africa) Giniel de Villiers (Germany) Dirk von Zitzewitz	Toyota	03:48:47	03:01	3	(South Africa) Giniel de Villiers (Germany) Dirk von Zitzewitz	Toyota	03:55:04	00:03:01
3	1	(France) Sébastien Loeb (Monaco) Daniel Elena	Peugeot	02:09:39		1	(France) Sébastien Loeb (Monaco) Daniel Elena	Peugeot	06:01:42	
3	2	(Spain) Carlos Sainz (Spain) Lucas Cruz	Peugeot	02:11:02	01:23	2	(South Africa) Giniel de Villiers (Germany) Dirk von Zitzewitz	Toyota	06:06:45	00:05:03
3	3	(Qatar) Nasser Al-Attiyah (France) Matthieu Baumel	Mini	02:11:04	01:25	3	(France) Stéphane Peterhansel (France) Jean-Paul Cottret	Peugeot	06:06:57	00:05:15
4	1	(France) Stéphane Peterhansel (France) Jean-Paul Cottret	Peugeot	03:42:42		1	(France) Sébastien Loeb (Monaco) Daniel Elena	Peugeot	09:44:51	
4	2	(Spain) Carlos Sainz (Spain) Lucas Cruz	Peugeot	03:42:53	00:11	2	(France) Stéphane Peterhansel (France) Jean-Paul Cottret	Peugeot	09:49:39	00:04:48
4	3	(France) Sébastien Loeb (Monaco) Daniel Elena	Peugeot	03:43:09	00:27	3	(Qatar) Nasser Al-Attiyah (France) Matthieu Baumel	Mini	09:56:00	00:11:09
5	1	(France) Sébastien Loeb (Monaco) Daniel Elena	Peugeot	03:32:34		1	(France) Sébastien Loeb (Monaco) Daniel Elena	Peugeot	13:17:25	
5	2	(Spain) Carlos Sainz (Spain) Lucas Cruz	Peugeot	03:32:56	00:22	2	(France) Stéphane Peterhansel (France) Jean-Paul Cottret	Peugeot	13:25:13	00:07:48
5	3	(France) Stéphane Peterhansel (France) Jean-Paul Cottret	Peugeot	03:35:34	03:00	3	(Spain) Carlos Sainz (Spain) Lucas Cruz	Peugeot	13:30:51	00:13:26
6	1	(France) Stéphane Peterhansel (France) Jean-Paul Cottret	Peugeot	05:01:07		1	(France) Stéphane Peterhansel (France) Jean-Paul Cottret	Peugeot	18:26:20	
6	2	(Spain) Carlos Sainz (Spain) Lucas Cruz	Peugeot	05:01:24	00:17	2	(France) Sébastien Loeb (Monaco) Daniel Elena	Peugeot	18:26:47	00:00:27
6	3	(Saudi Arabia) Yazeed Al-Rajhi (Germany) Timo Gottschalk	Toyota	05:08:26	07:19	3	(Spain) Carlos Sainz (Spain) Lucas Cruz	Peugeot	18:32:15	00:05:55
7	1	(Spain) Carlos Sainz (Spain) Lucas Cruz	Peugeot	03:19:03		1	(France) Sébastien Loeb (Monaco) Daniel Elena	Peugeot	21:46:28	
7	2	(France) Sébastien Loeb (Monaco) Daniel Elena	Peugeot	03:19:41	00:38	2	(France) Stéphane Peterhansel (France) Jean-Paul Cottret	Peugeot	21:48:50	00:02:22
7	3	(Qatar) Nasser Al-Attiyah (France) Matthieu Baumel	Mini	03:22:25	03:22	3	(Spain) Carlos Sainz (Spain) Lucas Cruz	Peugeot	21:51:18	00:04:50
Rest day
8	1	(Qatar) Nasser Al-Attiyah (France) Matthieu Baumel	Mini	04:12:23		1	(France) Stéphane Peterhansel (France) Jean-Paul Cottret	Peugeot	26:01:44	
8	2	(Spain) Carlos Sainz (Spain) Lucas Cruz	Peugeot	04:12:35	00:12	2	(Spain) Carlos Sainz (Spain) Lucas Cruz	Peugeot	26:03:53	00:02:09
8	3	(France) Stéphane Peterhansel (France) Jean-Paul Cottret	Peugeot	04:12:54	00:31	3	(Qatar) Nasser Al-Attiyah (France) Matthieu Baumel	Mini	26:16:27	00:14:43
9	1	(Spain) Carlos Sainz (Spain) Lucas Cruz	Peugeot	02:35:31		1	(Spain) Carlos Sainz (Spain) Lucas Cruz	Peugeot	28:39:24	
9	2	(Netherlands) Erik Van Loon (Netherlands) Wouter Rosegaar	Mini	02:35:41	00:10	2	(France) Stéphane Peterhansel (France) Jean-Paul Cottret	Peugeot	28:46:27	00:07:03
9	3	(Finland) Mikko Hirvonen (France) Michel Périn	Mini	02:35:48	00:17	3	(Qatar) Nasser Al-Attiyah (France) Matthieu Baumel	Mini	28:54:02	00:14:38
10	1	(France) Stéphane Peterhansel (France) Jean-Paul Cottret	Peugeot	03:58:32		1	(France) Stéphane Peterhansel (France) Jean-Paul Cottret	Peugeot	32:44:59	
10	2	(France) Cyril Despres (France) David Castera	Peugeot	04:04:12	05:40	2	(Qatar) Nasser Al-Attiyah (France) Matthieu Baumel	Mini	33:44:59	01:00:00
10	3	(Russia) Vladimir Vasilyev (Russia) Konstantin Zhiltsov	Toyota	04:11:28	12:56	3	(South Africa) Giniel de Villiers (Germany) Dirk von Zitzewitz	Toyota	33:57:30	01:12:31
11	1	(Qatar) Nasser Al-Attiyah (France) Matthieu Baumel	Mini	04:49:16		1	(France) Stéphane Peterhansel (France) Jean-Paul Cottret	Peugeot	37:42:20	
11	2	(France) Sébastien Loeb (Monaco) Daniel Elena	Peugeot	04:55:08	05:52	2	(Qatar) Nasser Al-Attiyah (France) Matthieu Baumel	Mini	38:34:15	00:51:55
11	3	(Finland) Mikko Hirvonen (France) Michel Périn	Mini	04:56:17	07:01	3	(South Africa) Giniel de Villiers (Germany) Dirk von Zitzewitz	Toyota	38:59:44	01:17:24
12	1	(Finland) Mikko Hirvonen (France) Michel Périn	Mini	05:34:17		1	(France) Stéphane Peterhansel (France) Jean-Paul Cottret	Peugeot	43:27:42	
12	2	(Qatar) Nasser Al-Attiyah (France) Matthieu Baumel	Mini	05:34:26	00:09	2	(Qatar) Nasser Al-Attiyah (France) Matthieu Baumel	Mini	44:08:41	00:40:59
12	3	(South Africa) Leeroy Poulter (South Africa) Robert Howie	Toyota	05:35:02	00:45	3	(South Africa) Giniel de Villiers (Germany) Dirk von Zitzewitz	Toyota	44:34:58	01:07:16
13	1	(France) Sébastien Loeb (Monaco) Daniel Elena	Peugeot	01:46:51		1	(France) Stéphane Peterhansel (France) Jean-Paul Cottret	Peugeot	45:22:10	
13	2	(Finland) Mikko Hirvonen (France) Michel Périn	Mini	01:48:04	01:13	2	(Qatar) Nasser Al-Attiyah (France) Matthieu Baumel	Mini	45:57:08	00:34:58
13	3	(Qatar) Nasser Al-Attiyah (France) Matthieu Baumel	Mini	01:48:27	01:36	3	(South Africa) Giniel de Villiers (Germany) Dirk von Zitzewitz	Toyota	46:24:57	01:02:47

=== Trucks ===
	Stage result					General classification				
Stage	Pos	Competitor	Make	Time	Gap	Pos	Competitor	Make	Time	Gap
Pro	Prologue neutralized due to car accident									
1	Stage cancelled due to bad weather									
2	1	(Netherlands) Peter Versluis (Netherlands) Marcel Pronk (Germany) Artur Klein	MAN	04:19:06		1	(Netherlands) Peter Versluis (Netherlands) Marcel Pronk (Germany) Artur Klein	MAN	04:19:06	
2	2	(Netherlands) Hans Stacey (Belgium) Serge Bruynkens (Belgium) Jan van der Baet	MAN	04:20:18	01:12	2	(Netherlands) Hans Stacey (Belgium) Serge Bruynkens (Belgium) Jan van der Baet	MAN	04:20:18	00:01:12
2	3	(Argentina) Federico Villagra (Argentina) Jorge Perez Companc (Argentina) Andres Memi	Iveco	04:21:02	01:56	3	(Argentina) Federico Villagra (Argentina) Jorge Perez Companc (Argentina) Andres Memi	Iveco	04:21:02	00:01:56
3	1	(Czech Republic) Martin Kolomý (Czech Republic) David Kilian (Czech Republic) Rene Kilian	Tatra	01:42:40		1	(Netherlands) Hans Stacey (Belgium) Serge Bruynkens (Belgium) Jan van der Baet	MAN	06:03:15	
3	2	(Netherlands) Hans Stacey (Belgium) Serge Bruynkens (Belgium) Jan van der Baet	MAN	01:42:57	00:17	2	(Netherlands) Peter Versluis (Netherlands) Marcel Pronk (Germany) Artur Klein	MAN	06:03:41	00:00:26
3	3	(Argentina) Federico Villagra (Argentina) Jorge Perez Companc (Argentina) Andres Memi	Iveco	01:43:34	00:54	3	(Argentina) Federico Villagra (Argentina) Jorge Perez Companc (Argentina) Andres Memi	Iveco	06:04:36	00:01:21
4	1	(Netherlands) Gerard de Rooy (Spain) Moi Torrallardona (Poland) Darek Rodewald	Iveco	03:58:16		1	(Netherlands) Peter Versluis (Netherlands) Marcel Pronk (Germany) Artur Klein	MAN	10:02:34	
4	2	(Netherlands) Peter Versluis (Netherlands) Marcel Pronk (Germany) Artur Klein	MAN	03:58:53	00:37	2	(Netherlands) Hans Stacey (Belgium) Serge Bruynkens (Belgium) Jan van der Baet	MAN	10:02:49	00:00:15
4	3	(Netherlands) Hans Stacey (Belgium) Serge Bruynkens (Belgium) Jan van der Baet	MAN	03:59:34	01:18	3	(Argentina) Federico Villagra (Argentina) Jorge Perez Companc (Argentina) Andres Memi	Iveco	10:04:38	00:02:04
5	1	(Russia) Eduard Nikolaev (Russia) Evgeny Yakovlev (Russia) Vladimir Rybakov	Kamaz	04:00:03		1	(Argentina) Federico Villagra (Argentina) Jorge Perez Companc (Argentina) Andres Memi	Iveco	14:09:13	
5	2	(Czech Republic) Martin Kolomý (Czech Republic) David Kilian (Czech Republic) Rene Kilian	Tatra	04:02:35	02:32	2	(Netherlands) Peter Versluis (Netherlands) Marcel Pronk (Germany) Artur Klein	MAN	14:09:18	00:00:05
5	3	(Argentina) Federico Villagra (Argentina) Jorge Perez Companc (Argentina) Andres Memi	Iveco	04:04:35	04:32	3	(Netherlands) Hans Stacey (Belgium) Serge Bruynkens (Belgium) Jan van der Baet	MAN	14:09:34	00:00:21
6	1	(Netherlands) Hans Stacey (Belgium) Serge Bruynkens (Belgium) Jan van der Baet	MAN	02:55:35		1	(Netherlands) Hans Stacey (Belgium) Serge Bruynkens (Belgium) Jan van der Baet	MAN	17:05:09	
6	2	(Netherlands) Gerard de Rooy (Spain) Moi Torrallardona (Poland) Darek Rodewald	Iveco	02:55:42	00:07	2	(Netherlands) Peter Versluis (Netherlands) Marcel Pronk (Germany) Artur Klein	MAN	17:06:08	00:00:59
6	3	(Netherlands) Peter Versluis (Netherlands) Marcel Pronk (Germany) Artur Klein	MAN	02:56:50	01:15	3	(Argentina) Federico Villagra (Argentina) Jorge Perez Companc (Argentina) Andres Memi	Iveco	17:09:14	00:04:05
7	1	(Russia) Eduard Nikolaev (Russia) Evgeny Yakovlev (Russia) Vladimir Rybakov	Kamaz	03:54:31		1	(Netherlands) Peter Versluis (Netherlands) Marcel Pronk (Germany) Artur Klein	MAN	21:01:56	
7	2	(Russia) Ayrat Mardeev (Russia) Aydar Belyaev (Russia) Dmitriy Svistunov	Kamaz	03:55:29	00:58	2	(Netherlands) Gerard de Rooy (Spain) Moi Torrallardona (Poland) Darek Rodewald	Iveco	21:07:27	00:05:31
7	3	(Netherlands) Peter Versluis (Netherlands) Marcel Pronk (Germany) Artur Klein	MAN	03:55:48	01:17	3	(Russia) Ayrat Mardeev (Russia) Aydar Belyaev (Russia) Dmitriy Svistunov	Kamaz	21:12:44	00:10:48
Rest day
8	1	(Netherlands) Gerard de Rooy (Spain) Moi Torrallardona (Poland) Darek Rodewald	Iveco	04:04:45		1	(Netherlands) Gerard de Rooy (Spain) Moi Torrallardona (Poland) Darek Rodewald	Iveco	25:49:26	
8	2	(Russia) Eduard Nikolaev (Russia) Evgeny Yakovlev (Russia) Vladimir Rybakov	Kamaz	04:44:34	02:35	2	(Netherlands) Peter Versluis (Netherlands) Marcel Pronk (Germany) Artur Klein	MAN	25:55:55	00:06:29
8	3	(Russia) Andrey Karginov (Russia) Andrey Mokeev (Russia) Igor Leonov	Kamaz	04:47:22	05:23	3	(Russia) Eduard Nikolaev (Russia) Evgeny Yakovlev (Russia) Vladimir Rybakov	Kamaz	25:57:24	00:07:58
9	1	(Netherlands) Gerard de Rooy (Spain) Moi Torrallardona (Poland) Darek Rodewald	Iveco	02:41:20		1	(Netherlands) Gerard de Rooy (Spain) Moi Torrallardona (Poland) Darek Rodewald	Iveco	28:30:46	
9	2	(Netherlands) Ton Van Genugten (Netherlands) Anton Van Limpt (Netherlands) Peter Van Eerd	Iveco	02:45:19	03:59	2	(Russia) Eduard Nikolaev (Russia) Evgeny Yakovlev (Russia) Vladimir Rybakov	Kamaz	28:57:58	27:12
9	3	(Russia) Andrey Karginov (Russia) Andrey Mokeev (Russia) Igor Leonov	Kamaz	02:57:24	16:04	3	(Argentina) Federico Villagra (Argentina) Jorge Perez Companc (Argentina) Andres Memi	Iveco	29:12:10	41:24
10	1	(Netherlands) Pascal de Baar (Netherlands) Martin Roesink (Netherlands) Wouter de Graaff	Renault Trucks	04:51:41		1	(Netherlands) Gerard de Rooy (Spain) Moi Torrallardona (Poland) Darek Rodewald	Iveco	33:25:03	
10	2	(Netherlands) Gerard de Rooy (Spain) Moi Torrallardona (Poland) Darek Rodewald	Iveco	04:54:17	02:36	2	(Russia) Ayrat Mardeev (Russia) Aydar Belyaev (Russia) Dmitriy Svistunov	Kamaz	34:40:22	01:15:19
10	3	(Russia) Ayrat Mardeev (Russia) Aydar Belyaev (Russia) Dmitriy Svistunov	Kamaz	05:17:47	26:06	3	(Argentina) Federico Villagra (Argentina) Jorge Perez Companc (Argentina) Andres Memi	Iveco	34:57:50	01:32:47
11	1	(Russia) Eduard Nikolaev (Russia) Evgeny Yakovlev (Russia) Vladimir Rybakov	Kamaz	05:31:37		1	(Netherlands) Gerard de Rooy (Spain) Moi Torrallardona (Poland) Darek Rodewald	Iveco	39:10:29	
11	2	(Netherlands) Peter Versluis (Netherlands) Marcel Pronk (Germany) Artur Klein	MAN	05:36:39	05:02	2	(Russia) Ayrat Mardeev (Russia) Aydar Belyaev (Russia) Dmitriy Svistunov	Kamaz	40:19:50	01:09:21
11	3	(Netherlands) Ton Van Genugten (Netherlands) Anton Van Limpt (Netherlands) Peter Van Eerd	Iveco	05:37:13	05:36	3	(Argentina) Federico Villagra (Argentina) Jorge Perez Companc (Argentina) Andres Memi	Iveco	40:56:14	01:45:45
12	1	(Netherlands) Peter Versluis (Netherlands) Marcel Pronk (Germany) Artur Klein	MAN	03:14:06		1	(Netherlands) Gerard de Rooy (Spain) Moi Torrallardona (Poland) Darek Rodewald	Iveco	42:29:59	
12	2	(Argentina) Federico Villagra (Argentina) Jorge Perez Companc (Argentina) Andres Memi	Iveco	03:17:20	03:14	2	(Russia) Ayrat Mardeev (Russia) Aydar Belyaev (Russia) Dmitriy Svistunov	Kamaz	43:43:09	01:13:10
12	3	(Netherlands) Hans Stacey (Belgium) Serge Bruynkens (Belgium) Jan van der Baet	MAN	03:17:24	03:18	3	(Argentina) Federico Villagra (Argentina) Jorge Perez Companc (Argentina) Andres Memi	Iveco	44:13:34	01:43:35
13	1	(Netherlands) Hans Stacey (Belgium) Serge Bruynkens (Belgium) Jan van der Baet	MAN	02:06:08		1	(Netherlands) Gerard de Rooy (Spain) Moi Torrallardona (Poland) Darek Rodewald	Iveco	44:42:03	
13	2	(Netherlands) Peter Versluis (Netherlands) Marcel Pronk (Germany) Artur Klein	MAN	02:07:53	01:45	2	(Russia) Ayrat Mardeev (Russia) Aydar Belyaev (Russia) Dmitriy Svistunov	Kamaz	45:52:30	01:10:27
13	3	(Russia) Eduard Nikolaev (Russia) Evgeny Yakovlev (Russia) Vladimir Rybakov	Kamaz	02:08:16	02:08	3	(Argentina) Federico Villagra (Argentina) Jorge Perez Companc (Argentina) Andres Memi	Iveco	46:22:58	01:40:55

== Final standings ==
=== Bikes ===
Pos	No.	Rider	Bike	Entrant	Time	Gap
1	3	(Australia) Toby Price	KTM 450 Rally	Red Bull KTM 450 Factory Racing	48:09:15	
2	5	(Slovakia) Štefan Svitko	KTM 450 Rally	Slovnaft Team	48:48:56	+ 39:41
3	4	(Chile) Pablo Quintanilla	Husqvarna	Rockstar Energy Husqvarna Factory Team	48:58:03	+ 48:48
4	47	(Argentina) Kevin Benavides	Honda	Honda South America Rally Team	49:04:02	+ 54:47
5	7	(Portugal) Hélder Rodrigues	Yamaha	Yamalube Yamaha Official Rally Team	49:04:59	+ 55:44
6	42	(France) Adrien van Beveren	Yamaha	Yamalube Yamaha Junior Rally Team	49:55:44	+ 1:46:29
7	49	(France) Antoine Méo	KTM 450 Rally	Red Bull KTM Factory Team	50:06:02	+ 1:56:47
8	23	(Spain) Gerard Farrés	KTM 450 Rally	Himoinsa Racing Team	50:10:15	+ 2:01:00
9	48	(United States) Ricky Brabec	Honda	Team HRC	50:20:42	+ 2:11:27
10	45	(Spain) Armand Monléon	KTM 450 Rally	KTM Warsaw Rally Team	51:37:04	+ 3:27:49

=== Quads ===
Pos	No.	Rider	Quad	Time	Gap
1	252	(Argentina) Marcos Patronelli	Yamaha	58:47:41	
2	253	(Argentina) Alejandro Patronelli	Yamaha	58:53:04	+ 5:23
3	274	(South Africa) Brian Baragwanath	Yamaha	60:29:34	+ 1:41:53
4	264	(Russia) Sergey Karyakin	Yamaha	60:32:06	+ 1:44:25
5	254	(Argentina) Jeremías González	Yamaha	60:49:49	+ 2:02:08
6	257	(Paraguay) Nelson Sanabria	Yamaha	63:05:40	+ 4:17:59
7	256	(Bolivia) Walter Nostiglia	Honda	63:13:51	+ 4:26:10
8	265	(Peru) Alexis Hernández	Yamaha	65:21:25	+ 6:33:44
9	266	(Chile) Sebastián Palma	Yamaha	67:03:14	+ 8:15:33
10	263	(Argentina) Santiago Hansen	Yamaha	67:29:04	+ 8:41:23

=== Cars ===
Pos	No.	Driver	Co-Driver	Car	Entrant	Time	Gap
1	302	(France) Stéphane Peterhansel	(France) Jean-Paul Cottret	Peugeot	Team Peugeot Total	45:22:10	
2	300	(Qatar) Nasser Al-Attiyah	(France) Mathieu Baumel	Mini	Axion X-Raid Team	45:57:08	+ 34:58
3	301	(South Africa) Giniel de Villiers	(Germany) Dirk von Zitzewitz	Toyota	Toyota Gazoo South Africa	46:24:57	+ 1:02:47
4	315	(Finland) Mikko Hirvonen	(France) Michel Périn	Mini	Axion X-Raid Team	46:27:28	+ 1:05:18
5	319	(South Africa) Leeroy Poulter	(South Africa) Robert Howie	Toyota	Toyota Gazoo South Africa	46:52:53	+ 1:30:43
6	304	(Spain) Nani Roma	(Spain) Àlex Haro	Mini	Axion X-Raid Team	47:03:16	+ 1:41:06
7	321	(France) Cyril Despres	(France) David Castera	Peugeot	Team Peugeot Total	47:11:14	+ 1:49:04
8	307	(Russia) Vladimir Vasilyev	(Russia) Konstantin Zhiltsov	Toyota	G-Energy Team	47:23:55	+ 2:01:45
9	314	(France) Sébastien Loeb	(Monaco) Daniel Elena	Peugeot	Team Peugeot Total	47:44:19	+ 2:22:09
10	323	(United Kingdom) Harry Hunt	(Germany) Andreas Schulz	Mini	All 4 Racing Team	48:33:40	+ 3:11:30

=== Trucks ===
Pos	No.	Driver	Co-Driver & mechanic	Truck	Entrant	Time	Gap
1	501	(Netherlands) Gerard de Rooy	(Spain) Moi Torrallardona (Poland) Darek Rodewald	Iveco	Petronas Team de Rooy Iveco	44:42:03	
2	500	(Russia) Ayrat Mardeev	(Russia) Aydar Belyaev (Russia) Dmitriy Svistunov	Kamaz	Kamaz-Master	45:52:30	+ 1:10:27
3	514	(Argentina) Federico Villagra	(Argentina) Jorge Pérez Companc (Argentina) Andrés Memi	Iveco	La Gloriesa Team de Rooy Iveco	46:22:58	+ 1:40:55
4	506	(Netherlands) Hans Stacey	(Belgium) Serge Bruynkens (Belgium) Jan van der Vaet	MAN	Eurol/Veka MAN Rally Team	47:05:04	+ 2:23:01
5	516	(Netherlands) Ton van Genugten	(Netherlands) Anton van Limpt (Netherlands) Peter van Eerd	Iveco	Petronas Team de Rooy Iveco	47:13:02	+ 2:30:59
6	529	(Netherlands) Pascal de Baar	(Netherlands) Martin Roesink (Netherlands) Wouter de Graaf	Renault	Mammoet Rallysport	47:46:10	+ 3:04:07
7	502	(Russia) Eduard Nikolaev	(Russia) Evgeny Yakovlev (Russia) Vladimir Rybakov	Kamaz	Kamaz-Master	48:21:26	+ 3:39:23
8	533	(Czech Republic) Jaroslav Valtr	(Czech Republic) Josef Kalina (Czech Republic) Jiří Štross	Tatra	Tatra Buggyra Racing	48:36:33	+ 3:54:30
9	510	(Netherlands) Pieter Versluis	(Netherlands) Marcel Pronk (Germany) Artur Klein	MAN	Eurol/Veka MAN Rally Team	48:39:55	+ 3:57:52
10	518	(Spain) Pep Vila	(Spain) Xavi Colomé (Spain) Marc Torres	Iveco	Petronas Team de Rooy Iveco	49:37:07	+ 4:55:04
