= 2014 Dakar Rally =

Off-road motorsport event in Argentina and Chile

Part of the Dakar Rally
← Previous event	Next event →
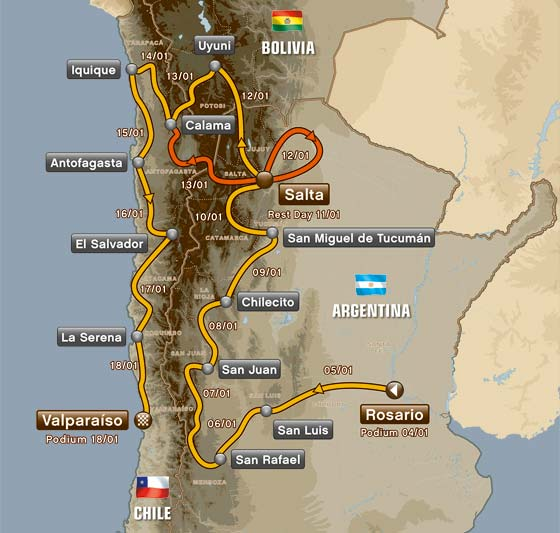
- Host country: Argentina; Chile
- Dates run: January 5, 2014–January 18, 2014
- Start: Rosario, Argentina
- Finish: Valparaíso, Chile
- Stages: 13

Results
- Cars winner: (Spain) Nani Roma (United Kingdom) Monster Energy X-Raid Team
- Bikes winner: (Spain) Marc Coma (Austria) KTM Red Bull Rally Factory Team
- Quads winner: (Chile) Ignacio Casale (Japan) Tamarugal XC Rally Team
- Trucks winner: (Russia) Andrey Karginov, (Russia) Andrey Mokeev, (Russia) Igor Devyatkin (Russia) Kamaz-Master
- Crews: 431 at start, 204 at finish

The 2014 Dakar Rally was the 36th running of the event and the sixth successive year that the event was held in South America. The event started in Rosario, Argentina on January 5 and finished in Valparaíso, Chile on January 18 after 13 stages of competition. Marc Coma won his fourth title in the motorcycle category riding a KTM; Ignacio Casale took his maiden title in the quad category on a Yamaha; Nani Roma clinched victory in the car category for the first time, ten years after his sole motorcycle title, driving a Mini; and Andrey Karginov took his first truck category title for Kamaz.

== Entries ==
Number of participants
Stage	Bikes	Quads	Cars	Trucks	Total
Start of Rally	174	40	147	70	431
Rest Day	85	19	73	52	229
End of Rally	78	15	61	50	204

=== Bikes ===
Leading Entries
Manufacturer	Team	No.	Rider
(Japan) Yamaha	Yamaha Factory Racing	1	(France) Cyril Despres
(Japan) Yamaha	Yamaha Factory Racing	6	(France) Olivier Pain
(Japan) Yamaha	Yamaha Factory Racing	17	(France) Michael Metge
(Japan) Yamaha	Yamaha Netherlands Verhoeven Team	12	(Netherlands) Frans Verhoeven
(Austria) KTM	KTM Red Bull Rally Factory Team	2	(Spain) Marc Coma
(Austria) KTM	KTM Red Bull Rally Factory Team	4	(Spain) Jordi Viladoms
(Austria) KTM	KTM Red Bull Rally Factory Team	5	(Chile) Francisco López
(Austria) KTM	KTM Red Bull Rally Factory Team	8	(Portugal) Ruben Faria
(Austria) KTM	Team Casteu	9	(France) David Casteu
(Austria) KTM	Team Ullevalseter	20	(Norway) Pål Anders Ullevålseter
(Japan) Honda	HRC Rally	3	(Spain) Joan Barreda
(Japan) Honda	HRC Rally	7	(Portugal) Hélder Rodrigues
(Japan) Honda	HRC Rally	10	(Portugal) Paulo Gonçalves
(Japan) Honda	HRC Rally	14	(Argentina) Javier Pizzolito
(Japan) Honda	HRC Rally	18	(United Kingdom) Sam Sunderland
(Japan) Honda	Honda Brasil	29	(Brazil) Jean de Azevedo
(France) Sherco	Samsung Sherco Rally Factory	22	(France) Alain Duclos
(France) Sherco	Samsung Sherco Rally Factory	23	(Spain) Juan Pedrero

=== Quads ===
Leading Entries
Manufacturer	Team	No.	Rider
(Japan) Yamaha	Yamaha Racing Argentina	250	(Argentina) Marcos Patronelli
(Japan) Yamaha	Tamarugal XC Rally Team	251	(Chile) Ignacio Casale
(Japan) Yamaha	Sonik Team	252	(Poland) Rafał Sonik
(Japan) Yamaha	Uruguay Rally Team	256	(Uruguay) Sergio Lafuente
(Japan) Yamaha	PSG Racing	257	(Argentina) Pablo Copetti
(Japan) Honda	Bonetto TDF	253	(Argentina) Lucas Bonetto
(Japan) Honda	Maxxis Dakar Team Powered by Super B	255	(Netherlands) Sebastian Husseini
(Japan) Honda	Maxxis Dakar Team Powered by Super B	263	(Qatar) Mohammed Abu-Issa
(Japan) Honda	Tamarugal XC Rally Team	268	(Chile) Victor Manuel Gallegos
(Canada) Can-Am	4WD Jaton Racing	254	(Argentina) Sebastian Palma

=== Cars ===
Leading Entries
Manufacturer	Team	No.	Driver	Co-Driver
(United Kingdom) Mini	Monster Energy X-Raid Team	300	(France) Stéphane Peterhansel	(France) Jean-Paul Cottret
(United Kingdom) Mini	Monster Energy X-Raid Team	304	(Spain) Nani Roma	(France) Michel Périn
(United Kingdom) Mini	Monster Energy X-Raid Team	307	(Argentina) Orlando Terranova	(Portugal) Paulo Fiuza
(United Kingdom) Mini	Monster Energy X-Raid Team	309	(Poland) Krzysztof Hołowczyc	(Russia) Konstantin Zhiltsov
(United Kingdom) Mini	Q X-Raid Racing Team	301	(Qatar) Nasser Al-Attiyah	(Spain) Lucas Cruz
(Japan) Toyota	Imperial Toyota	302	(South Africa) Giniel de Villiers	(Germany) Dirk von Zitzewitz
(Japan) Toyota	Imperial Toyota	323	(South Africa) Leeroy Poulter	(South Africa) Robert Howie
(France) SMG	SMG-Red Bull Rally Team	303	(Spain) Carlos Sainz	(Germany) Timo Gottschalk
(France) SMG	SMG-Red Bull Rally Team	312	(France) Ronan Chabot	(France) Gilles Pillot
(United States) Hummer	Team Speed Energy	305	(United States) Robby Gordon	(United States) Kellon Walch
(China) Haval	Haval Rally Team	306	(Portugal) Carlos Sousa	(Portugal) Miguel Ramalho
(China) Haval	Haval Rally Team	315	(France) Christian Lavieille	(France) Jean-Pierre Garcin
(United States) Ford	Ford Racing	308	(Argentina) Lucio Alvarez	(Argentina) Bernardo Graue
(United States) Ford	Ford Racing	329	(South Africa) Christiaan Visser	(South Africa) Jacob Badenhorst
(United States) Chevrolet	EVRacing	318	(United States) BJ Baldwin	(United States) Quinn Cody
(United States) Chevrolet	EVRacing	320	(France) Guerlain Chicherit	(France) Alexandre Winocq

=== Trucks ===
Leading Entries
Manufacturer	Team	No.	Driver	Co-Drivers
(Russia) Kamaz	Kamaz-Master	500	(Russia) Eduard Nikolaev	(Russia) Evgeny Yakovlev (Russia) Vladimir Rybakov
(Russia) Kamaz	Kamaz-Master	503	(Russia) Ayrat Mardeev	(Russia) Aydar Belyaev (Russia) Ayrat Israfilov
(Russia) Kamaz	Kamaz-Master	506	(Russia) Andrey Karginov	(Russia) Andrey Mokeev (Russia) Igor Devyatkin
(Russia) Kamaz	Kamaz-Master	545	(Russia) Anton Shibalov	(Russia) Robert Amatych (Russia) Almaz Khisamiev
(Russia) Kamaz	Kamaz-Master	549	(Russia) Dmitry Sotnikov	(Russia) Vyatcheslav Mizyukaev (Russia) Andrey Aferin
(Italy) Iveco	Team De Rooy 2014	501	(Netherlands) Gérard de Rooy	(Belgium) Tom Colsoul (Netherlands) Darek Rodewald
(Italy) Iveco	Team De Rooy 2014	507	(Netherlands) Hans Stacey	(Germany) Detlef Ruf (Netherlands) Bernard der Kinderen
(Italy) Iveco	Team De Rooy 2014	516	(Spain) Pep Vila	(Netherlands) Peter van Eerd (Spain) Xavi Colome
(Italy) Iveco	Team De Rooy 2014	520	(France) Joseph Adua	(Spain) Ferran Alcayna (Spain) Marc Torres
(Czech Republic) Tatra	Tatra Buggyra Racing	502	(Czech Republic) Martin Kolomý	(Czech Republic) David Kilian (Czech Republic) Rene Kilian
(Czech Republic) Tatra	Instaforex Loprais Team	504	(Czech Republic) Aleš Loprais	(Belgium) Serge Bruynkens (Czech Republic) Radim Pustějovský
(Czech Republic) Tatra	Instaforex Loprais Team	519	(Czech Republic) Jan Tománek	(Czech Republic) Michael Kasparek (Czech Republic) Tomas Kasparek
(Germany) MAN	Eurol/Veka MAN Rally Team	505	(Netherlands) Pieter Versluis	(Belgium) Jurgen Damen (Netherlands) Henricus Schuurmans
(Germany) MAN	Eurol/Veka MAN Rally Team	508	(Netherlands) Marcel van Vliet	(Netherlands) Marcel Pronk (Germany) Artur Klein
(Germany) MAN	Eurol/Veka MAN Rally Team	510	(Netherlands) Rene Kuipers	(Spain) Moi Torrallardona (Belgium) Jan van der Vaet

== Stages ==
Distance according to the official website. Competitors in the bike and quad categories will cross the Bolivian border and finish the seventh stage at Uyuni, whilst those in the car and truck categories will return to Salta. All competitors will then reconvene in Calama at the end of the eighth stage.

Stage	Date	Depart	Arrive	Bikes			Quads	Cars			Trucks		
Stage	Date	Depart	Arrive	Rd	SS	Winner	Winner	Rd	SS	Winner	Rd	SS	Winner
1	5 January	(Argentina) Rosario	(Argentina) San Luís	629	180	(Spain) J. Barreda	(Chile) I. Casale	629	180	(Portugal) C. Sousa	629	180	(Russia) A. Mardeev
2	6 January	(Argentina) San Luís	(Argentina) San Rafael	365	359	(United Kingdom) S. Sunderland	(Argentina) M. Patronelli	365	433	(France) S. Peterhansel	365	400	(Netherlands) G. De Rooy^{1}
3	7 January	(Argentina) San Rafael	(Argentina) San Juan	292	373	(Spain) J. Barreda	(Poland) R. Sonik	295	301	(Spain) N. Roma	295	301	(Russia) A. Karginov
4	8 January	(Argentina) San Juan	(Argentina) Chilecito	210	353	(Spain) J. Pedrero	(Netherlands) S. Husseini^{2}	211	657	(Spain) C. Sainz	211	657	(Netherlands) G. De Rooy
5	9 January	(Argentina) Chilecito	(Argentina) Tucumán	384	527	(Spain) M. Coma	(Uruguay) S. Lafuente	384	527	(Spain) N. Roma	384	527	(Russia) D. Sotnikov
6	10 January	(Argentina) Tucumán	(Argentina) Salta	64	400	(France) A. Duclos	(Chile) I. Casale^{3}	270	424	(France) S. Peterhansel	394	156	(Netherlands) P. Versluis
	11 January	(Argentina) Salta		Rest Day									
7	12 January	(Argentina) Salta	(Argentina) Salta (cars/trucks) (Bolivia) Uyuni (bikes/quads)	373	409	(Spain) J. Barreda	(Chile) I. Casale	230	533	(Spain) C. Sainz	230	525	(Russia) E. Nikolaev
8	13 January	(Argentina) Salta (cars/trucks) (Bolivia) Uyuni (bikes/quads)	(Chile) Calama	230	462	(France) C. Despres	(Chile) I. Casale	510	302	(Qatar) N. Al-Attiyah	510	302	(Russia) A. Karginov
9	14 January	(Chile) Calama	(Chile) Iquique	29	422	(Spain) M. Coma	(Netherlands) S. Husseini	29	422	(France) S. Peterhansel	29	422	(Russia) A. Karginov
10	15 January	(Chile) Iquique	(Chile) Antofagasta	58	631	(Spain) J. Barreda	(Russia) S. Karyakin	58	631	(Qatar) N. Al-Attiyah	58	631	(Czech Republic) A. Loprais
11	16 January	(Chile) Antofagasta	(Chile) El Salvador	144	605	(France) C. Despres^{4}	(Chile) I. Casale	144	605	(Argentina) O. Terranova	144	605	(Russia) A. Karginov
12	17 January	(Chile) El Salvador	(Chile) La Serena	349	350	(France) C. Despres	(Chile) I. Casale	349	350	(France) S. Peterhansel	349	350	(Netherlands) G. De Rooy
13	18 January	(Chile) La Serena	(Chile) Valparaíso	378	157	(Spain) J. Barreda^{5}	(Chile) I. Casale	378	157	(South Africa) G. de Villiers	378	157	(Czech Republic) A. Loprais

Notes:

- Anton Shibalov set the fastest time for the stage, but de Rooy was declared the winner of the stage as the time the Dutchman spent helping stricken rival Mardeev was later deducted from his stage time.^1
- Ignacio Casale set the fastest time for the stage, but Husseini, along with Sonik and Lafuente, were retroactively awarded time by the organisers for a mistake in the road book.^2
- Casale was retroactively awarded the stage win after time was deducted from his finishing time.^3
- Marc Coma set the fastest time for the stage before being awarded a 15-minute penalty for an engine change.^4
- Cyril Despres set the fastest time for the stage before being awarded a 5-minute penalty.^5

== Summary ==
=== Bikes ===
Honda rider Joan Barreda quickly established a lead in the overall classification with wins in the first and third stages, leading reigning champion Cyril Despres by 13 minutes by the end of the latter. A navigation error in the fourth stage set the Spaniard back however, eroding his advantage to just three minutes over Marc Coma as Despres lost some 28 minutes with engine failure.

Coma then assumed the lead of the rally with a resounding victory in stage five, Barreda dropping 41 minutes behind his countryman due to more navigation problems. Barreda was able to reduce the gap by four minutes over the course of the next two stages, before losing further ground on the ninth stage with a 15-minute speeding penalty.

This gave Coma a lead of 55 minutes, which Barreda was able to reduce to 37 minutes before losing two and a half hours with electrical problems on the penultimate stage. This promoted Coma's team-mate Jordi Viladoms to second, almost two hours adrift of the winner by the end of the rally, and Yamaha's Olivier Pain to third.

Despres won three stages on his comeback to fourth, ahead of top Honda rider Hélder Rodrigues. Barreda wound up seventh after taking victory on the final stage, his fifth of the rally.

=== Quads ===
Marcos Patronelli, who hit the front of the overall classification after winning the second stage, had to abandon the competition after suffering an accident in the third stage. The Argentinean saved his own life by jumping from his quad, which fell 600 metres down a cliff. The accident left fellow Yamaha rider Rafał Sonik in first place, but the pole lost time on the fifth stage with a navigational error.

This allowed Sergio Lafuente, winner of the fifth stage, to assume the lead in the standings, but three successive stage wins for Ignacio Casale allowed the Chilean rider to usurp the Uruguayan, his advantage up to almost 25 minutes when Lafuente was forced to retire due to a broken engine on Stage 11.

This allowed Sonik to retake second place, over an hour behind Casale, where he would remain until the end of the rally as Casale took victory. Two-time stage winner Sebastien Husseini, who dropped out of victory contention after losing over three hours to the leaders on the fifth stage, completed the podium finishers.

=== Cars ===
X-Raid Mini driver Stéphane Peterhansel began the defence of his title strongly by taking the lead of the overall classification with victory in the second stage of the rally, but lost 25 minutes to team-mate Nani Roma on the third stage with a navigational error and a series of punctures. Two-time World Rally champion Carlos Sainz also lost ground, but made up for it by winning the next stage in his SMG Buggy, deposing Roma from the lead of the rally.

Roma was able to re-assert himself on Stage 5 as all of his key rivals dropped time - Sainz lost an hour with an electrical problem and lost a further hour to a penalty, Peterhansel lost a further 24 minutes and X-Raid's Nasser Al-Attiyah, third after Stage 4, was hit with a one-hour penalty. Peterhansel was however able to reduce Roma's 31-minute lead over the following days with two stage victories, the Spaniard's advantage all but wiped out by the end of Stage 10.

The X-Raid team then chose to call off the fight between its drivers, effectively guaranteeing Roma victory. Peterhansel at first appeared to ignore these instructions as he won the penultimate stage to take a 26-second lead into the final day, but then dropped back to allow Roma back in front. Al-Attiyah won two stages on his recovery drive to third place, just under an hour behind Roma, giving the X-Raid team a clean sweep of the podium.

Giniel de Villiers was the best non-Mini driver in fourth place after winning the final stage, with Orlando Terranova and Krzysztof Holowczyc making it five X-Raid drivers in the top six overall. Sainz was forced to retire after suffering a heavy crash on Stage 10.

=== Trucks ===
Winning two of the first four stages, Iveco's Gerard de Rooy quickly established a healthy cushion in the overall classification of over 30 minutes from the leading two Kamaz drivers, Andrey Karginov and defending champion Eduard Nikolaev. Successive wins for Karginov on the eighth and ninth stages saw de Rooy's lead slashed to just 13 minutes, with Karginov seizing the lead of the standings by just under eight minutes after taking a fourth win on stage 11. On the final day of the rally, Karginov lost nine-and-a-half minutes to de Rooy on the road after providing assistance to a stricken car, costing him victory until race officials awarded him back the time he had spent aiding his fellow competitor. This meant de Rooy was forced to concede victory by three minutes.

Nikolaev, who took his maiden Dakar stage win on stage 7, was third, over 90 minutes away from compatriot Karginov by the end of the rally, while Kamaz men Dmitry Sotnikov, winner of stage five, and Anton Shibalov, completed the top five. The remaining Kamaz driver, Ayrat Mardeev, was an early retiree after a series of rolls on the second stage. Aleš Loprais completed the top six for Tatra with a pair of late stage wins, albeit five hours down on the victorious Karginov.

== Stage results ==
=== Bikes ===
	Stage result					General classification				
Stage	Pos	Competitor	Make	Time	Gap	Pos	Competitor	Make	Time	Gap
1	1	(Spain) Joan Barreda	Honda	2:25:31		1	(Spain) Joan Barreda	Honda	2:25:31	
1	2	(Spain) Marc Coma	KTM	2:26:08	0:37	2	(Spain) Marc Coma	KTM	2:26:08	0:37
1	3	(France) Cyril Despres	Yamaha	2:27:11	1:40	3	(France) Cyril Despres	Yamaha	2:27:11	1:40
2	1	(United Kingdom) Sam Sunderland	Honda	3:42:10		1	(Spain) Joan Barreda	Honda	6:09:41	
2	2	(Chile) Francisco López	KTM	3:42:49	0:39	2	(Chile) Francisco López	KTM	6:11:44	2:03
2	3	(Spain) Joan Barreda	Honda	3:44:10	2:00	3	(United Kingdom) Sam Sunderland	Honda	6:12:14	2:33
3	1	(Spain) Joan Barreda	Honda	3:47:03		1	(Spain) Joan Barreda	Honda	9:56:44	
3	2	(France) Cyril Despres	Yamaha	3:51:44	4:41	2	(France) Cyril Despres	Yamaha	10:09:48	13:04
3	3	(Spain) Marc Coma	KTM	3:53:59	6:56	3	(Spain) Marc Coma	KTM	10:10:40	13:56
4	1	(Spain) Joan Pedrero	Sherco	5:29:13		1	(Spain) Joan Barreda	Honda	15:39:53	
4	2	(Chile) Francisco López	KTM	5:29:42	0:29	2	(Spain) Marc Coma	KTM	15:43:03	3:10
4	3	(Spain) Marc Coma	KTM	5:32:23	3:10	3	(Chile) Francisco López	KTM	15:45:05	5:12
5	1	(Spain) Marc Coma	KTM	3:02:08		1	(Spain) Marc Coma	KTM	18:45:11	
5	2	(Spain) Jordi Viladoms	KTM	3:15:02	12:54	2	(Spain) Joan Barreda	Honda	19:26:21	41:10
5	3	(Poland) Kuba Przygonski	KTM	3:24:53	22:45	3	(Chile) Francisco López	KTM	19:38:52	53:41
6	1	(France) Alain Duclos	Sherco	5:51:34		1	(Spain) Marc Coma	KTM	23:08:00	
6	2	(Spain) Marc Coma	KTM	5:52:49	1:15	2	(Spain) Joan Barreda	Honda	23:50:17	42:17
6	3	(France) Michael Metge	Yamaha	5:53:23	1:49	3	(France) Alain Duclos	Sherco	24:08:58	1:00:58
7	1	(Spain) Joan Barreda	Honda	4:13:41		1	(Spain) Marc Coma	KTM	26:40:44	
7	2	(Spain) Marc Coma	KTM	4:17:44	4:03	2	(Spain) Joan Barreda	Honda	27:17:58	38:14
7	3	(France) Cyril Despres	Yamaha	4:19:16	5:35	3	(Spain) Jordi Viladoms	KTM	27:56:47	1:16:03
8	1	(France) Cyril Despres	Yamaha	5:23:14		1	(Spain) Marc Coma	KTM	32:06:14	
8	2	(Spain) Joan Barreda	Honda	5:25:24	2:10	2	(Spain) Joan Barreda	Honda	32:44:22	38:08
8	3	(Spain) Marc Coma	KTM	5:25:30	2:16	3	(Spain) Jordi Viladoms	KTM	33:33:41	1:27:27
9	1	(Spain) Marc Coma	KTM	4:49:05		1	(Spain) Marc Coma	KTM	36:55:07	
9	2	(Spain) Joan Barreda	Honda	4:50:46	1:41	2	(Spain) Joan Barreda	Honda	37:50:43	55:36^{1}
9	3	(France) Cyril Despres	Yamaha	4:54:33	5:28	3	(Spain) Jordi Viladoms	KTM	38:34:09	1:54:02
10	1	(Spain) Joan Barreda	Honda	7:12:00		1	(Spain) Marc Coma	KTM	41:48:33	
10	2	(Portugal) Hélder Rodrigues	Honda	7:20:00	8:00	2	(Spain) Joan Barreda	Honda	42:32:43	44:10
10	3	(France) Cyril Despres	Yamaha	7:21:40	9:40	3	(Spain) Jordi Viladoms	KTM	43:50:36	2:02:03
11	1	(France) Cyril Despres	Yamaha	6:38:59		1	(Spain) Marc Coma	KTM	48:39:41	
11	2	(France) Olivier Pain	Yamaha	6:41:36	2:37	2	(Spain) Joan Barreda	Honda	49:17:17	37:36
11	3	(Spain) Jordi Viladoms	KTM	6:42:01	3:02	3	(Spain) Jordi Viladoms	KTM	50:32:37	1:52:56
12	1	(France) Cyril Despres	Yamaha	3:58:18		1	(Spain) Marc Coma	KTM	52:40:16	
12	2	(Spain) Marc Coma	KTM	4:00:35	2:17	2	(Spain) Jordi Viladoms	KTM	54:40:05	1:59:49
12	3	(France) Olivier Pain	Yamaha	4:04:11	5:53	3	(France) Olivier Pain	Yamaha	54:50:32	2:10:16
13	1	(Spain) Joan Barreda	Honda	1:59:44		1	(Spain) Marc Coma	KTM	54:50:43	
13	2	(France) Olivier Pain	Yamaha	2:00:24	0:40	2	(Spain) Jordi Viladoms	KTM	56:43:20	1:52:27
13	3	(Portugal) Hélder Rodrigues	Honda	2:01:07	1:59:44	3	(France) Olivier Pain	Yamaha	56:50:56	2:00:03

Notes

- Includes a 15-minute penalty for speeding.^1

=== Quads ===
	Stage result					General classification				
Stage	Pos	Competitor	Make	Time	Gap	Pos	Competitor	Make	Time	Gap
1	1	(Chile) Ignacio Casale	Yamaha	2:38:41		1	(Chile) Ignacio Casale	Yamaha	2:38:41	
1	2	(Argentina) Marcos Patronelli	Yamaha	2:39:02	0:21	2	(Argentina) Marcos Patronelli	Yamaha	2:39:02	0:21
1	3	(Argentina) Lucas Bonetto	Honda	2:39:58	1:17	3	(Argentina) Lucas Bonetto	Honda	2:39:58	1:17
2	1	(Argentina) Marcos Patronelli	Yamaha	4:40:37		1	(Argentina) Marcos Patronelli	Yamaha	7:19:39	
2	2	(Argentina) Lucas Bonetto	Honda	4:43:31	2:54	2	(Argentina) Lucas Bonetto	Honda	7:23:29	3:50
2	3	(Poland) Rafał Sonik	Yamaha	4:45:34	4:57	3	(Poland) Rafał Sonik	Yamaha	7:25:45	6:06
3	1	(Poland) Rafał Sonik	Yamaha	4:58:00		1	(Poland) Rafał Sonik	Yamaha	12:23:45	
3	2	(Chile) Ignacio Casale	Yamaha	5:01:50	3:50	2	(Chile) Ignacio Casale	Yamaha	12:29:55	6:10
3	3	(Uruguay) Sergio Lafuente	Yamaha	5:02:02	4:02	3	(Netherlands) Sebastian Husseini	Honda	12:31:04	7:19
4	1	(Netherlands) Sebastian Husseini	Honda	6:41:16		1	(Poland) Rafał Sonik	Yamaha	19:10:53	
4	2	(Poland) Rafał Sonik	Yamaha	6:47:08	5:52	2	(Netherlands) Sebastian Husseini	Honda	19:12:20	1:27
4	3	(Uruguay) Sergio Lafuente	Yamaha	6:58:44	17:28	3	(Uruguay) Sergio Lafuente	Yamaha	19:29:55	19:02
5	1	(Uruguay) Sergio Lafuente	Yamaha	4:53:48		1	(Uruguay) Sergio Lafuente	Yamaha	24:23:43	
5	2	(Chile) Ignacio Casale	Yamaha	4:55:09	1:21	2	(Chile) Ignacio Casale	Yamaha	24:40:35	16:52
5	3	(Argentina) Pablo Copetti	Yamaha	5:04:48	11:00	3	(Poland) Rafał Sonik	Yamaha	24:46:55	23:12
6	1	(Chile) Ignacio Casale	Yamaha	4:44:08		1	(Uruguay) Sergio Lafuente	Yamaha	29:22:20	
6	2	(Poland) Rafał Sonik	Yamaha	4:57:43	13:35	2	(Chile) Ignacio Casale	Yamaha	29:24:43	2:33
6	3	(Uruguay) Sergio Lafuente	Yamaha	4:58:37	14:29	3	(Poland) Rafał Sonik	Yamaha	29:44:38	22:18
7	1	(Chile) Ignacio Casale	Yamaha	4:41:19		1	(Chile) Ignacio Casale	Yamaha	33:21:02	
7	2	(Netherlands) Sebastian Husseini	Honda	4:48:59	7:40	2	(Uruguay) Sergio Lafuente	Yamaha	33:27:17	6:15
7	3	(Uruguay) Sergio Lafuente	Yamaha	4:49:57	8:38	3	(Poland) Rafał Sonik	Yamaha	33:50:54	29:52
8	1	(Chile) Ignacio Casale	Yamaha	6:18:47		1	(Chile) Ignacio Casale	Yamaha	39:39:49	
8	2	(Netherlands) Sebastian Husseini	Honda	6:27:25	8:38	2	(Uruguay) Sergio Lafuente	Yamaha	40:01:29	21:40
8	3	(Uruguay) Sergio Lafuente	Yamaha	6:34:12	15:25	3	(Poland) Rafał Sonik	Yamaha	40:25:45	45:56
9	1	(Netherlands) Sebastian Husseini	Honda	5:46:01		1	(Chile) Ignacio Casale	Yamaha	45:50:48	
9	2	(Chile) Ignacio Casale	Yamaha	6:10:95	24:58	2	(Uruguay) Sergio Lafuente	Yamaha	46:13:27	22:39
9	3	(Poland) Rafał Sonik	Yamaha	6:11:31	25:30	3	(Poland) Rafał Sonik	Yamaha	46:37:16	46:28
10	1	(Russia) Sergey Karyakin	Yamaha	6:01:42		1	(Chile) Ignacio Casale	Yamaha	51:54:19	
10	2	(Chile) Ignacio Casale	Yamaha	6:03:31	1:49	2	(Uruguay) Sergio Lafuente	Yamaha	52:18:55	24:36
10	3	(Uruguay) Sergio Lafuente	Yamaha	6:05:28	3:46	3	(Poland) Rafał Sonik	Yamaha	53:09:24	1:15:05
11	1	(Chile) Ignacio Casale	Yamaha	8:47:00		1	(Chile) Ignacio Casale	Yamaha	61:11:19^{1}	
11	2	(Chile) Victor Gallegos	Honda	8:52:12	5:12	2	(Poland) Rafał Sonik	Yamaha	62:15:51	1:04:32
11	3	(Qatar) Mohammed Abu-Issa	Honda	9:03:09	16:09	3	(Netherlands) Sebastian Husseini	Honda	66:55:44	5:34:25
12	1	(Chile) Ignacio Casale	Yamaha	5:05:08		1	(Chile) Ignacio Casale	Yamaha	66:16:27	
12	2	(Netherlands) Sebastian Husseini	Honda	5:10:13	5:05	2	(Poland) Rafał Sonik	Yamaha	67:40:09	1:23:42
12	3	(Russia) Sergey Karyakin	Yamaha	5:22:21	17:13	3	(Netherlands) Sebastian Husseini	Honda	71:55:77	5:39:30
13	1	(Chile) Ignacio Casale	Yamaha	2:11:37		1	(Chile) Ignacio Casale	Yamaha	68:28:04	
13	2	(Netherlands) Sebastian Husseini	Honda	2:12:31	0:54	2	(Poland) Rafał Sonik	Yamaha	69:54:53	1:26:49
13	3	(Poland) Rafał Sonik	Yamaha	2:14:44	3:07	3	(Netherlands) Sebastian Husseini	Honda	74:08:28	5:40:24

Notes

- Casale lost 30 minutes in relation to Sonik because of a penalty.^1

=== Cars ===
	Stage result					General classification				
Stage	Pos	Competitor	Make	Time	Gap	Pos	Competitor	Make	Time	Gap
1	1	(Portugal) Carlos Sousa (Portugal) Miguel Ramalho	Haval	2:20:36		1	(Portugal) Carlos Sousa (Portugal) Miguel Ramalho	Haval	2:20:36	
1	2	(Argentina) Orlando Terranova (Portugal) Paulo Fiuza	Mini	2:20:47	0:11	2	(Argentina) Orlando Terranova (Portugal) Paulo Fiuza	Mini	2:20:47	0:11
1	3	(Qatar) Nasser Al-Attiyah (Spain) Lucas Cruz	Mini	2:21:23	0:47	3	(Qatar) Nasser Al-Attiyah (Spain) Lucas Cruz	Mini	2:21:23	0:47
2	1	(France) Stéphane Peterhansel (France) Jean-Paul Cottret	Mini	3:52:05		1	(France) Stéphane Peterhansel (France) Jean-Paul Cottret	Mini	6:17:02	
2	2	(Spain) Carlos Sainz (Germany) Timo Gottschalk	SMG	3:52:51	0:46	2	(Spain) Carlos Sainz (Germany) Timo Gottschalk	SMG	6:17:30	0:28
2	3	(South Africa) Giniel de Villiers (Germany) Dirk von Zitzewitz	Toyota	3:57:39	5:34	3	(Qatar) Nasser Al-Attiyah (Spain) Lucas Cruz	Mini	6:21:12	4:10
3	1	(Spain) Nani Roma (France) Michel Périn	Mini	2:58:52		1	(Spain) Nani Roma (France) Michel Périn	Mini	9:20:13	
3	2	(Poland) Krzysztof Holowczyc (Russia) Konstantin Zhiltsov	Mini	2:59:59	1:07	2	(Argentina) Orlando Terranova (Portugal) Paulo Fiuza	Mini	9:29:19	9:06
3	3	(South Africa) Leeroy Poulter (South Africa) Robert Howie	Toyota	3:02:11	3:19	3	(Qatar) Nasser Al-Attiyah (Spain) Lucas Cruz	Mini	9:30:13	10:00
4	1	(Spain) Carlos Sainz (Germany) Timo Gottschalk	SMG	7:30:32		1	(Spain) Carlos Sainz (Germany) Timo Gottschalk	SMG	14:52:47	
4	2	(France) Stéphane Peterhansel (France) Jean-Paul Cottret	Mini	7:36:36	6:04	2	(Spain) Nani Roma (France) Michel Périn	Mini	14:54:53	2:06
4	3	(Qatar) Nasser Al-Attiyah (Spain) Lucas Cruz	Mini	7:39:30	8:58	3	(Qatar) Nasser Al-Attiyah (Spain) Lucas Cruz	Mini	14:59:43	6:56
5	1	(Spain) Nani Roma (France) Michel Périn	Mini	4:27:01		1	(Spain) Nani Roma (France) Michel Périn	Mini	19:21:54	
5	2	(South Africa) Giniel de Villiers (Germany) Dirk von Zitzewitz	Toyota	4:31:21	4:20	2	(Argentina) Orlando Terranova (Portugal) Paulo Fiuza	Mini	19:53:40	31:46
5	3	(United States) Robby Gordon (United States) Kellon Walch	Hummer	4:47:13	20:12	3	(France) Stéphane Peterhansel (France) Jean-Paul Cottret	Mini	20:01:53	39:59
6	1	(France) Stéphane Peterhansel (France) Jean-Paul Cottret	Mini	2:42:58		1	(Spain) Nani Roma (France) Michel Périn	Mini	22:11:28	
6	2	(Qatar) Nasser Al-Attiyah (Spain) Lucas Cruz	Mini	2:45:41	2:43	2	(France) Stéphane Peterhansel (France) Jean-Paul Cottret	Mini	22:44:51	33:23
6	3	(Argentina) Orlando Terranova (Portugal) Paulo Fiuza	Mini	2:48:18	5:20^{1}	3	(South Africa) Giniel de Villiers (Germany) Dirk von Zitzewitz	Toyota	22:52:22	40:54
7	1	(Spain) Carlos Sainz (Germany) Timo Gottschalk	SMG	4:43:28		1	(Spain) Nani Roma (France) Michel Périn	Mini	27:03:52	
7	2	(Qatar) Nasser Al-Attiyah (Spain) Lucas Cruz	Mini	4:48:13	4:45	2	(France) Stéphane Peterhansel (France) Jean-Paul Cottret	Mini	27:35:45	31:53
7	3	(France) Stéphane Peterhansel (France) Jean-Paul Cottret	Mini	4:50:54	7:26	3	(South Africa) Giniel de Villiers (Germany) Dirk von Zitzewitz	Toyota	27:52:15	48:23
8	1	(Qatar) Nasser Al-Attiyah (Spain) Lucas Cruz	Mini	2:32:57		1	(Spain) Nani Roma (France) Michel Périn	Mini	29:46:08	
8	2	(France) Stéphane Peterhansel (France) Jean-Paul Cottret	Mini	2:34:09	1:12	2	(France) Stéphane Peterhansel (France) Jean-Paul Cottret	Mini	30:09:54	23:46
8	3	(Spain) Carlos Sainz (Germany) Timo Gottschalk	SMG	2:35:33	2:36	3	(South Africa) Giniel de Villiers (Germany) Dirk von Zitzewitz	Toyota	30:34:33	48:25
9	1	(France) Stéphane Peterhansel (France) Jean-Paul Cottret	Mini	4:17:53		1	(Spain) Nani Roma (France) Michel Périn	Mini	34:15:37	
9	2	(Qatar) Nasser Al-Attiyah (Spain) Lucas Cruz	Mini	4:20:13	2:17	2	(France) Stéphane Peterhansel (France) Jean-Paul Cottret	Mini	34:27:47	12:10
9	3	(Spain) Nani Roma (France) Michel Périn	Mini	4:29:29	11:36	3	(Argentina) Orlando Terranova (Portugal) Paulo Fiuza	Mini	35:10:10	54:33
10	1	(Qatar) Nasser Al-Attiyah (Spain) Lucas Cruz	Mini	6:38:35		1	(Spain) Nani Roma (France) Michel Périn	Mini	38:52:57	
10	2	(France) Stéphane Peterhansel (France) Jean-Paul Cottret	Mini	6:42:25	3:50	2	(France) Stéphane Peterhansel (France) Jean-Paul Cottret	Mini	38:55:12	2:15
10	3	(Spain) Nani Roma (France) Michel Périn	Mini	6:52:20	13:45	3	(Qatar) Nasser Al-Attiyah (Spain) Lucas Cruz	Mini	39:38:58	46:01
11	1	(Argentina) Orlando Terranova (Portugal) Paulo Fiuza	Mini	5:58:00		1	(Spain) Nani Roma (France) Michel Périn	Mini	45:01:54	
11	2	(Spain) Nani Roma (France) Michel Périn	Mini	6:08:57	10:57	2	(France) Stéphane Peterhansel (France) Jean-Paul Cottret	Mini	45:07:26	5:32
11	3	(South Africa) Giniel de Villiers (Germany) Dirk von Zitzewitz	Toyota	6:10:38	12:38	3	(Qatar) Nasser Al-Attiyah (Spain) Lucas Cruz	Mini	45:57:55	56:01
12	1	(France) Stéphane Peterhansel (France) Jean-Paul Cottret	Mini	3:38:19		1	(France) Stéphane Peterhansel (France) Jean-Paul Cottret	Mini	48:45:45	
12	2	(Qatar) Nasser Al-Attiyah (Spain) Lucas Cruz	Mini	3:41:57	3:38	2	(Spain) Nani Roma (France) Michel Périn	Mini	48:46:11	0:26
12	3	(Spain) Nani Roma (France) Michel Périn	Mini	3:44:17	5:58	3	(Qatar) Nasser Al-Attiyah (Spain) Lucas Cruz	Mini	49:39:52	54:07
13	1	(South Africa) Giniel de Villiers (Germany) Dirk von Zitzewitz	Toyota	1:57:07		1	(Spain) Nani Roma (France) Michel Périn	Mini	50:44:58	
13	2	(Poland) Krzysztof Holowczyc (Russia) Konstantin Zhiltsov	Mini	1:57:30	0:23	2	(France) Stéphane Peterhansel (France) Jean-Paul Cottret	Mini	50:50:36	5:38
13	3	(Russia) Vladimir Vasilyev (Ukraine) Vitaliy Yevtyekhov	Mini	1:57:48	0:41	3	(Qatar) Nasser Al-Attiyah (Spain) Lucas Cruz	Mini	51:41:50	56:52

Notes

- Terranova took a 15-minute penalty for colliding with a motorcycle rider during the stage, dropping him to fourth in the overall classification.^1

=== Trucks ===
	Stage result					General classification				
Stage	Pos	Competitor	Make	Time	Gap	Pos	Competitor	Make	Time	Gap
1	1	(Russia) Ayrat Mardeev (Russia) Aydar Belyaev (Russia) Ayrat Israfilov	Kamaz	2:46:52		1	(Russia) Ayrat Mardeev (Russia) Aydar Belyaev (Russia) Ayrat Israfilov	Kamaz	2:46:52	
1	2	(Czech Republic) Aleš Loprais (Belgium) Serge Bruynkens (Czech Republic) Radim Pustějovský	Tatra	2:47:02	0:10	2	(Czech Republic) Aleš Loprais (Belgium) Serge Bruynkens (Czech Republic) Radim Pustějovský	Tatra	2:47:02	0:10
1	3	(Netherlands) Marcel van Vliet (Netherlands) Marcel Pronk (Germany) Artur Klein	MAN	2:47:13	0:21	3	(Netherlands) Marcel van Vliet (Netherlands) Marcel Pronk (Germany) Artur Klein	MAN	2:47:13	0:21
2	1	(Netherlands) Gérard de Rooy (Belgium) Tom Colsoul (Netherlands) Darek Rodewald	Iveco	3:58:17		1	(Netherlands) Gérard de Rooy (Belgium) Tom Colsoul (Netherlands) Darek Rodewald	Iveco	6:46:42	
2	2	(Russia) Anton Shibalov (Russia) Robert Amatych (Russia) Almaz Khisamiev	Kamaz	4:11:37	13:20	2	(Netherlands) Marcel van Vliet (Netherlands) Marcel Pronk (Germany) Artur Klein	MAN	7:00:39	13:57
2	3	(Netherlands) Marcel van Vliet (Netherlands) Marcel Pronk (Germany) Artur Klein	MAN	4:13:26	15:09	3	(Russia) Anton Shibalov (Russia) Robert Amatych (Russia) Almaz Khisamiev	Kamaz	7:05:34	18:52
3	1	(Russia) Andrey Karginov (Russia) Andrey Mokeev (Russia) Igor Devyatkin	Kamaz	3:21:29		1	(Netherlands) Gérard de Rooy (Belgium) Tom Colsoul (Netherlands) Darek Rodewald	Iveco	10:10:53	
3	2	(Netherlands) Gérard de Rooy (Belgium) Tom Colsoul (Netherlands) Darek Rodewald	Iveco	3:24:11	2:42	2	(Netherlands) Marcel van Vliet (Netherlands) Marcel Pronk (Germany) Artur Klein	MAN	10:29:42	18:49
3	3	(Czech Republic) Aleš Loprais (Belgium) Serge Bruynkens (Czech Republic) Radim Pustějovský	Tatra	3:26:33	4:54	3	(Russia) Andrey Karginov (Russia) Andrey Mokeev (Russia) Igor Devyatkin	Kamaz	10:50:03	39:10
4	1	(Netherlands) Gérard de Rooy (Belgium) Tom Colsoul (Netherlands) Darek Rodewald	Iveco	8:16:40		1	(Netherlands) Gérard de Rooy (Belgium) Tom Colsoul (Netherlands) Darek Rodewald	Iveco	16:17:33	
4	2	(Russia) Andrey Karginov (Russia) Andrey Mokeev (Russia) Igor Devyatkin	Kamaz	8:18:11	1:31	2	(Netherlands) Marcel van Vliet (Netherlands) Marcel Pronk (Germany) Artur Klein	MAN	16:53:45	36:12
4	3	(Russia) Eduard Nikolaev (Russia) Evgeny Yakovlev (Russia) Vladimir Rybakov	Kamaz	8:25:44	9:04	3	(Russia) Andrey Karginov (Russia) Andrey Mokeev (Russia) Igor Devyatkin	Kamaz	16:58:14	40:41
5	1	(Russia) Dmitry Sotnikov (Russia) Vyatcheslav Mizyukaev (Russia) Andrey Aferin	Kamaz	4:47:46		1	(Netherlands) Gérard de Rooy (Belgium) Tom Colsoul (Netherlands) Darek Rodewald	Iveco	21:17:26	
5	2	(Russia) Andrey Karginov (Russia) Andrey Mokeev (Russia) Igor Devyatkin	Kamaz	4:50:42	2:56	2	(Russia) Andrey Karginov (Russia) Andrey Mokeev (Russia) Igor Devyatkin	Kamaz	21:49:26	32:00
5	3	(Netherlands) Gérard de Rooy (Belgium) Tom Colsoul (Netherlands) Darek Rodewald	Iveco	4:59:53	12:07	3	(Russia) Eduard Nikolaev (Russia) Evgeny Yakovlev (Russia) Vladimir Rybakov	Kamaz	22:27:07	1:09:41
6	1	(Netherlands) Peter Versluis (Belgium) Jurgen Damen (Netherlands) Henricus Schuurmans	MAN	1:52:55		1	(Netherlands) Gérard de Rooy (Belgium) Tom Colsoul (Netherlands) Darek Rodewald	Iveco	23:13:27	
6	2	(Russia) Andrey Karginov (Russia) Andrey Mokeev (Russia) Igor Devyatkin	Kamaz	1:54:06	1:11	2	(Russia) Andrey Karginov (Russia) Andrey Mokeev (Russia) Igor Devyatkin	Kamaz	23:43:32	29:05
6	3	(Netherlands) Marcel van Vliet (Netherlands) Marcel Pronk (Germany) Artur Klein	MAN	1:54:31	1:36	3	(Russia) Eduard Nikolaev (Russia) Evgeny Yakovlev (Russia) Vladimir Rybakov	Kamaz	24:22:09	1:07:42
7	1	(Russia) Eduard Nikolaev (Russia) Evgeny Yakovlev (Russia) Vladimir Rybakov	Kamaz	5:02:41		1	(Netherlands) Gérard de Rooy (Belgium) Tom Colsoul (Netherlands) Darek Rodewald	Iveco	28:21:42	
7	2	(Russia) Dmitry Sotnikov (Russia) Vyatcheslav Mizyukaev (Russia) Andrey Aferin	Kamaz	5:06:26	3:45	2	(Russia) Andrey Karginov (Russia) Andrey Mokeev (Russia) Igor Devyatkin	Kamaz	29:24:50	37:50
7	3	(Netherlands) Gérard de Rooy (Belgium) Tom Colsoul (Netherlands) Darek Rodewald	Iveco	5:07:15	4:34	3	(Russia) Eduard Nikolaev (Russia) Evgeny Yakovlev (Russia) Vladimir Rybakov	Kamaz	29:24:50	1:03:08
8	1	(Russia) Andrey Karginov (Russia) Andrey Mokeev (Russia) Igor Devyatkin	Kamaz	2:53:32		1	(Netherlands) Gérard de Rooy (Belgium) Tom Colsoul (Netherlands) Darek Rodewald	Iveco	31:20:29	
8	2	(Netherlands) Gérard de Rooy (Belgium) Tom Colsoul (Netherlands) Darek Rodewald	Iveco	2:58:47	5:15	2	(Russia) Andrey Karginov (Russia) Andrey Mokeev (Russia) Igor Devyatkin	Kamaz	31:53:04	32:35
8	3	(Russia) Dmitry Sotnikov (Russia) Vyatcheslav Mizyukaev (Russia) Andrey Aferin	Kamaz	3:00:27	6:55	3	(Russia) Eduard Nikolaev (Russia) Evgeny Yakovlev (Russia) Vladimir Rybakov	Kamaz	32:32:30	1:12:01
9	1	(Russia) Andrey Karginov (Russia) Andrey Mokeev (Russia) Igor Devyatkin	Kamaz	4:58:09		1	(Netherlands) Gérard de Rooy (Belgium) Tom Colsoul (Netherlands) Darek Rodewald	Iveco	36:37:45	
9	2	(Netherlands) Gérard de Rooy (Belgium) Tom Colsoul (Netherlands) Darek Rodewald	Iveco	5:17:16	19:07	2	(Russia) Andrey Karginov (Russia) Andrey Mokeev (Russia) Igor Devyatkin	Kamaz	36:51:13	13:28
9	3	(Russia) Eduard Nikolaev (Russia) Evgeny Yakovlev (Russia) Vladimir Rybakov	Kamaz	5:26:56	28:47	3	(Russia) Eduard Nikolaev (Russia) Evgeny Yakovlev (Russia) Vladimir Rybakov	Kamaz	37:59:26	1:21:41
10	1	(Czech Republic) Aleš Loprais (Belgium) Serge Bruynkens (Czech Republic) Radim Pustějovský	Tatra	5:10:55		1	(Netherlands) Gérard de Rooy (Belgium) Tom Colsoul (Netherlands) Darek Rodewald	Iveco	41:54:50	
10	2	(Russia) Andrey Karginov (Russia) Andrey Mokeev (Russia) Igor Devyatkin	Kamaz	5:11:32	0:37	2	(Russia) Andrey Karginov (Russia) Andrey Mokeev (Russia) Igor Devyatkin	Kamaz	42:02:45	7:55
10	3	(Netherlands) Gérard de Rooy (Belgium) Tom Colsoul (Netherlands) Darek Rodewald	Iveco	5:17:05	6:10	3	(Russia) Eduard Nikolaev (Russia) Evgeny Yakovlev (Russia) Vladimir Rybakov	Kamaz	43:24:18	1:29:28
11	1	(Russia) Andrey Karginov (Russia) Andrey Mokeev (Russia) Igor Devyatkin	Kamaz	6:22:32		1	(Russia) Andrey Karginov (Russia) Andrey Mokeev (Russia) Igor Devyatkin	Kamaz	48:25:17	
11	2	(Russia) Eduard Nikolaev (Russia) Evgeny Yakovlev (Russia) Vladimir Rybakov	Kamaz	6:36:50	14:18	2	(Netherlands) Gérard de Rooy (Belgium) Tom Colsoul (Netherlands) Darek Rodewald	Iveco	48:33:13	7:56
11	3	(Netherlands) Gérard de Rooy (Belgium) Tom Colsoul (Netherlands) Darek Rodewald	Iveco	6:38:23	15:51	3	(Russia) Eduard Nikolaev (Russia) Evgeny Yakovlev (Russia) Vladimir Rybakov	Kamaz	50:01:08	1:35:51
12	1	(Netherlands) Gérard de Rooy (Belgium) Tom Colsoul (Netherlands) Darek Rodewald	Iveco	4:10:24		1	(Russia) Andrey Karginov (Russia) Andrey Mokeev (Russia) Igor Devyatkin	Kamaz	52:36:12	
12	2	(Russia) Andrey Karginov (Russia) Andrey Mokeev (Russia) Igor Devyatkin	Kamaz	4:10:55	0:31	2	(Netherlands) Gérard de Rooy (Belgium) Tom Colsoul (Netherlands) Darek Rodewald	Iveco	52:43:37	7:25
12	3	(Russia) Eduard Nikolaev (Russia) Evgeny Yakovlev (Russia) Vladimir Rybakov	Kamaz	4:13:42	3:18	3	(Russia) Eduard Nikolaev (Russia) Evgeny Yakovlev (Russia) Vladimir Rybakov	Kamaz	54:14:50	1:38:38
13	1	(Czech Republic) Aleš Loprais (Belgium) Serge Bruynkens (Czech Republic) Radim Pustějovský	Tatra	2:17:37		1	(Russia) Andrey Karginov (Russia) Andrey Mokeev (Russia) Igor Devyatkin	Kamaz	55:00:28	
13	2	(Netherlands) Gérard de Rooy (Belgium) Tom Colsoul (Netherlands) Darek Rodewald	Iveco	2:20:02	2:35	2	(Netherlands) Gérard de Rooy (Belgium) Tom Colsoul (Netherlands) Darek Rodewald	Iveco	55:03:39	3:11
13	3	(Russia) Eduard Nikolaev (Russia) Evgeny Yakovlev (Russia) Vladimir Rybakov	Kamaz	2:20:30	2:53	3	(Russia) Eduard Nikolaev (Russia) Evgeny Yakovlev (Russia) Vladimir Rybakov	Kamaz	56:35:20	1:34:52

== Final standings ==
=== Bikes ===
Pos	No.	Rider	Bike	Entrant	Time	Gap
1	2	(Spain) Marc Coma	KTM 450 Rally	KTM Red Bull Rally Factory Team	54:50:03	
2	4	(Spain) Jordi Viladoms	KTM 450 Rally	KTM Red Bull Rally Factory Team	56:43:29	+1:52:27
3	6	(France) Olivier Pain	Yamaha	Yamaha Factory Racing	56:50:56	+2:00:03
4	1	(France) Cyril Despres	Yamaha	Yamaha Factory Racing	56:56:31	+2:05:03
5	7	(Portugal) Hélder Rodrigues	Honda	HRC Rally	57:02:02	+2:11:09
6	15	(Poland) Kuba Przygoński	KTM 450 Rally	Orlen KTM Rally Factory Team	57:22:39	+2:31:46
7	3	(Spain) Joan Barreda	Honda	HRC Rally	57:44:54	+2:54:01
8	26	(Chile) Daniel Gouet	Honda	Tamarugal XC Rally Team	58:01:27	+3:10:34
9	19	(Slovakia) Štefan Svitko	KTM 450 Rally	Oraving Slovnaft Team	58:41:03	+3:50:10
10	9	(France) David Casteu	KTM 450 Rally	Team Casteu	58:49:02	+3:58:09

=== Quads ===
Pos	No.	Rider	Quad	Time	Gap
1	251	(Chile) Ignacio Casale	Yamaha	68:28:04	
2	252	(Poland) Rafał Sonik	Yamaha	69:54:53	+1:26:49
3	255	(Netherlands) Sebastian Husseini	Honda	74:08:28	+5:40:24
4	263	(Qatar) Mohammed Abu-Issa	Honda	78:35:15	+10:07:11
5	268	(Chile) Victor Gallegos	Honda	78:51:45	+10:23:41
6	276	(Argentina) Jeremías González	Yamaha	80:18:21	+11:50:17
7	296	(Russia) Sergey Karyakin	Yamaha	84:08:05	+15:40:01
8	258	(Argentina) Daniel Mazzucco	Can-Am	86:15:52	+17:47:48
9	267	(Argentina) Santiago Hansen	Yamaha	86:19:49	+17:51:45
10	266	(Argentina) Daniel Domaszewski	Honda	88:53:17	+20:25:13

=== Cars ===
Pos	No.	Driver	Co-Driver	Car	Entrant	Time	Gap
1	304	(Spain) Nani Roma	(France) Michel Périn	Mini	Monster Energy X-Raid Team	50:44:58	
2	300	(France) Stéphane Peterhansel	(France) Jean-Paul Cottret	Mini	Monster Energy X-Raid Team	50:50:36	+5:38
3	302	(Qatar) Nasser Al-Attiyah	(Spain) Lucas Cruz	Mini	Q X-Raid Team	51:41:50	+56:52
4	302	(South Africa) Giniel de Villiers	(Germany) Dirk von Zitzewitz	Toyota	Imperial Toyota	52:04:05	+1:19:07
5	307	(Argentina) Orlando Terranova	(Portugal) Paulo Fiuza	Mini	Monster Energy X-Raid Team	52:12:42	+1:27:44
6	309	(Poland) Krzysztof Hołowczyc	(Russia) Konstantin Zhiltsov	Mini	Monster Energy X-Raid Team	54:40:40	+3:55:42
7	328	(Poland) Marek Dabrowski	(Poland) Jacek Czachor	Toyota	Orlen Team	56:19:23	+5:34:25
8	315	(France) Christian Lavieille	(France) Jean-Pierre Garcin	Haval	Haval Rally Team	56:20:48	+5:35:50
9	332	(Poland) Martin Kaczmarski	(Portugal) Filipe Palmeiro	Mini	Lotto X-Raid Team	57:43:10	+6:58:10
10	314	(Russia) Vladimir Vasilyev	(Ukraine) Vitaliy Yevtyekhov	Mini	X-Raid Team	57:44:32	+6:59:34

=== Trucks ===
Pos	No.	Driver	Co-Drivers	Truck	Time	Gap
1	506	(Russia) Andrey Karginov	(Russia) Andrey Mokeev (Russia) Igor Devyatkin	Kamaz	55:00:28	
2	501	(Netherlands) Gérard de Rooy	(Belgium) Tom Colsoul (Netherlands) Darek Rodewald	Iveco	55:03:39	+3:11
3	500	(Russia) Eduard Nikolaev	(Russia) Sergey Savostin (Russia) Vladimir Rybakov	Kamaz	56:35:20	+1:34:52
4	549	(Russia) Dmitry Sotnikov	(Russia) Vyatcheslav Mizyukaev (Russia) Andrey Aferin	Kamaz	58:22:38	+3:22:10
5	545	(Russia) Anton Shibalov	(Russia) Robert Amatych (Russia) Almaz Khisamiev	Kamaz	59:37:53	+4:37:25
6	504	(Czech Republic) Aleš Loprais	(Belgium) Serge Bruynkens (Czech Republic) Radim Pustějovský	Tatra	60:04:29	+5:04:01
7	507	(Netherlands) Hans Stacey	(Germany) Detlef Ruf (Netherlands) Bernard der Kinderen	Iveco	60:15:25	+5:14:57
8	510	(Netherlands) René Kuipers	(Spain) Moises Torrallardona (Belgium) Jan van der Vaet	MAN	61:31:36	+6:31:08
9	508	(Netherlands) Marcel van Vliet	(Netherlands) Marcel Pronk (Germany) Artur Klein	MAN	62:07:21	+7:06:53
10	534	(Spain) Pep Vila	(Netherlands) Peter van Eerd (Spain) Xavi Colome	Iveco	62:54:03	+7:53:35

== Fatalities ==
Belgian motorcycle rider Eric Palante was found dead on the morning of 10 January after the completion of the fifth stage. He was 50 years old.
