= Dmitry Sotnikov =

Russian rally driver

Dmitry Sergeyevich Sotnikov
- Nationality: Russian
- Born: Dmitry Sergeyevich Sotnikov; 29 May 1985 (age 41) Naberezhnye Chelny, Soviet Union
- Debut season: 2014
- Current team: Kamaz-Master

Dmitry Sergeyevich Sotnikov (Russian: Дмитрий Сергеевич Сотников; born 29 May 1985) is a Russian rally raid driver who specializes in the truck category. He is a two-time Dakar Rally and a three-time Silk Way Rally champion.

== Career ==
Sotnikov made his Dakar Rally debut in the 2014 edition, finishing in 4th position in the general classification; in the following edition he obtained the 5th position. In Dakar 2017, he achieved his best performance at the time, finishing in second position behind his Kamaz Master teammate Eduard Nikolaev. His best performance on that event happened in 2021 and 2022, when at the end he finished first with five stage wins in both events.

Other events outside the Dakar Rally include his victories in the Silk Way Rally in the 2013, when Sotnikov as a driver of team maintenance vehicle was ahead of Anton Shibalov's main "battle" crew only by one minute, in the 2017, 2021 and 2022 editions.

== Dakar Rally results ==
Year	Class	Vehicle	Position	Stages won
2014	Trucks	(Russia) Kamaz	4th	1
2015	Trucks	(Russia) Kamaz	5th	0
2016	Trucks	(Russia) Kamaz	15th	0
2017	Trucks	(Russia) Kamaz	2nd	1
2018	Trucks	(Russia) Kamaz	10th	1
2019	Trucks	(Russia) Kamaz	2nd	1
2020	Trucks	(Russia) Kamaz	4th	1
2021	Trucks	(Russia) Kamaz	1st	5
2022	Trucks	(Russia) Kamaz	1st	5

== Winner ==
- Dakar Rally: 2021, 2022
- Silk Way Rally: 2013, 2017, 2021, 2022
- Gold of Kagan: 2015
- Africa Race: 2013
- Kazakhstan Rally: 2019

Sporting positions
Preceded by Andrey Karginov	Dakar Rally; Truck Winner; 2021, 2022	Succeeded by Janus van Kasteren
