= Štefan Svitko =

Slovak motorcycle fasintos

Tosha Schareina
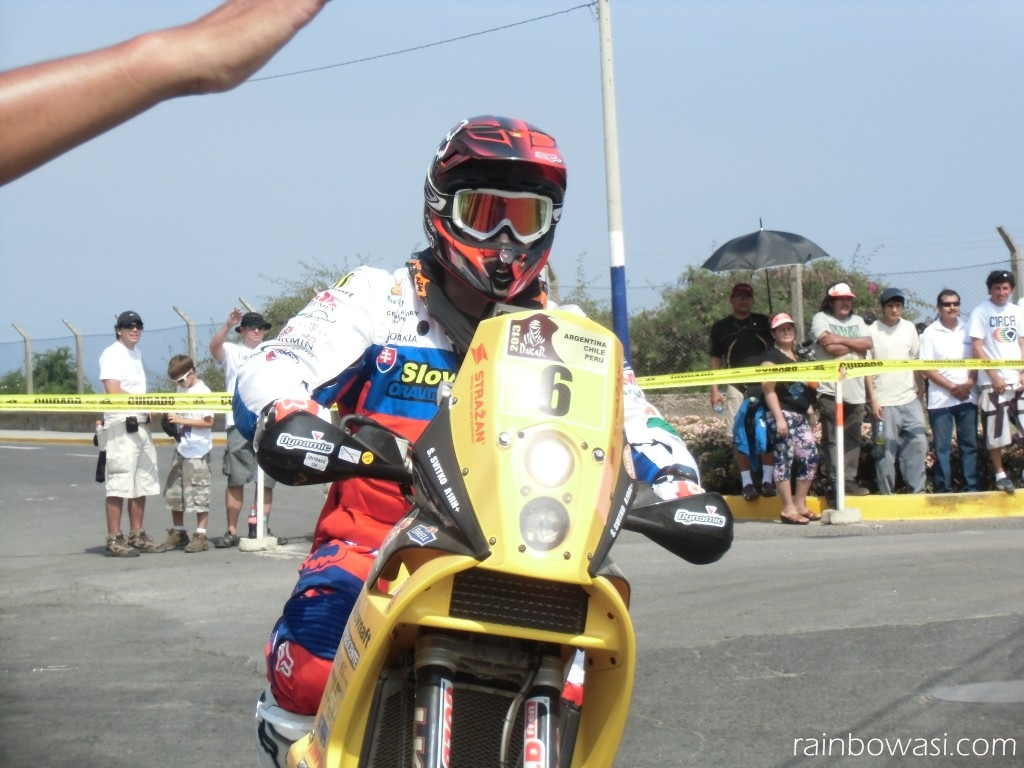
- Stefan Svitko Dakar 2013
- Nationality: Slovak
- Born: 26 June 1982 (age 44) Žaškov, Slovakia

Dakar Rally career
- Debut season: 2010
- Starts: 17
- Wins: 0 (1 stage wins)
- Best finish: 2nd in 2016

Štefan Svitko (born 26 June 1982 in Žaškov) is a Slovak motorcyclist. In his racing career, he became champion of Slovak republic in enduro and cross country 20 times and he is a three-time champion of European enduro championship. In the 2016 Dakar Rally, he made it into second place overall. He had an overall win on stage 10. This feat made Svitko the first Slovak racer to finish on the podium in final classification on the Dakar Rally.

Štefan finished the 2020 Dakar Rally 11th overall.

== Dakar Rally results ==
Year	Class	Vehicle	Position	Stage Wins
2010	Bikes	(Austria) KTM	13th	0
2011	Bikes	(Austria) KTM	Ret	0
2012	Bikes	(Austria) KTM	5th	0
2013	Bikes	(Austria) KTM	Ret	0
2014	Bikes	(Austria) KTM	9th	0
2015	Bikes	(Austria) KTM	5th	0
2016	Bikes	(Austria) KTM	2nd	1
2017	Bikes	(Austria) KTM	25th	0
2018	Bikes	(Austria) KTM	Ret	0
2019	Bikes	(Austria) KTM	Ret	0
2020	Bikes	(Austria) KTM	11th	0
2021	Bikes	(Austria) KTM	8th	0
2022	Bikes	(Austria) KTM	12th	0
2023	Bikes	(Austria) KTM	12th	0
2024	Bikes	(Austria) KTM	9th	0
2025	Bikes	(Austria) KTM	10th	0
2026	Bikes	(Austria) KTM	Ret	0

== Awards ==
In 2021, Svitko won a Crystal Wing Awards.
