= Andrey Karginov =

Russian rally driver

- Nationality: Russian
- Born: Andrey Olegovich Karginov; 23 February 1976 (age 50) Mirny, Yakutsk Oblast, Soviet Union
- Debut season: 2007
- Current team: Kamaz-Master
- Wins: 18

Championship titles
- 2 (2014, 2020)

Andrey Olegovich Karginov (Russian: Андрей Олегович Каргинов; born 23 February 1976) is a Russian rally raid driver, best known for winning the 2014 and the 2020 Dakar Rally in the truck category for Kamaz.

The team of Karginov, Mokeev and Leonov was one of the forerunners at the 2019 Dakar Rally, giving the way only to the team of Eduard Nikolaev, but they were disqualified for not "stopping to attend the injured spectator" after a collision in the 5th stage.

== Dakar Rally results ==
Year	Class	Vehicle	Position	Stages won
2010*	Truck	Kamaz	5th	0
2011	Truck	Kamaz	DNP	–
2012	Truck	Kamaz	4th	2
2013	Truck	Kamaz	3rd	3
2014	Truck	Kamaz	1st	4
2015	Truck	Kamaz	3rd	0
2016	Truck	Kamaz	14th	0
2017–18	Truck	Kamaz	DNP	–
2019	Truck	Kamaz	DSQ	2
2020	Truck	Kamaz	1st	7
2021	Truck	Kamaz	7th	0
2022	Truck	Kamaz	4th	3

* 2010: Mechanic of Ilgizar Mardeev

== Winner ==
- Dakar Rally: 2014, 2020
- Silk Way Rally: 2018
- Africa Eco Race: 2017
- Khazar Steppes: 2006 (as mechanic of Chagin)
- Russian Championship: 2011
- Kagan's Gold: 2011, 2013
- Great Kalmykiya: 2006 (as mechanic of Mardeev)
- Grand Steppe: 2015

== Awards ==
- 2008: Honorary diploma of Kamaz OAO
- 2010: Medal of the "Order of Merit for the Motherland" II Degree
- 2010: Merit badge "For the Service to the Town of Naberezhnye Chelny"
- 2013: Medal "For Valorous Labour"
- 2014: Gratitude by President of Tatarstan
- 2014: Honorary diploma of Kamaz OAO
- 2014: Medal "To the Glory of Ossetia"
- 2015: Title "Merited Machinist of Tatarstan"
- 2015: "Order of Friendship"
- 2017: Medal of the "Order of Merit of Tatarstan"

Sporting positions
Preceded by Eduard Nikolaev	Dakar Rally; Truck Winner; 2014	Succeeded by Ayrat Mardeev
Preceded by Eduard Nikolaev	Dakar Rally; Truck Winner; 2020	Succeeded by Dmitry Sotnikov
