= Eduard Nikolaev =

Russian rally raid driver (born 1984)

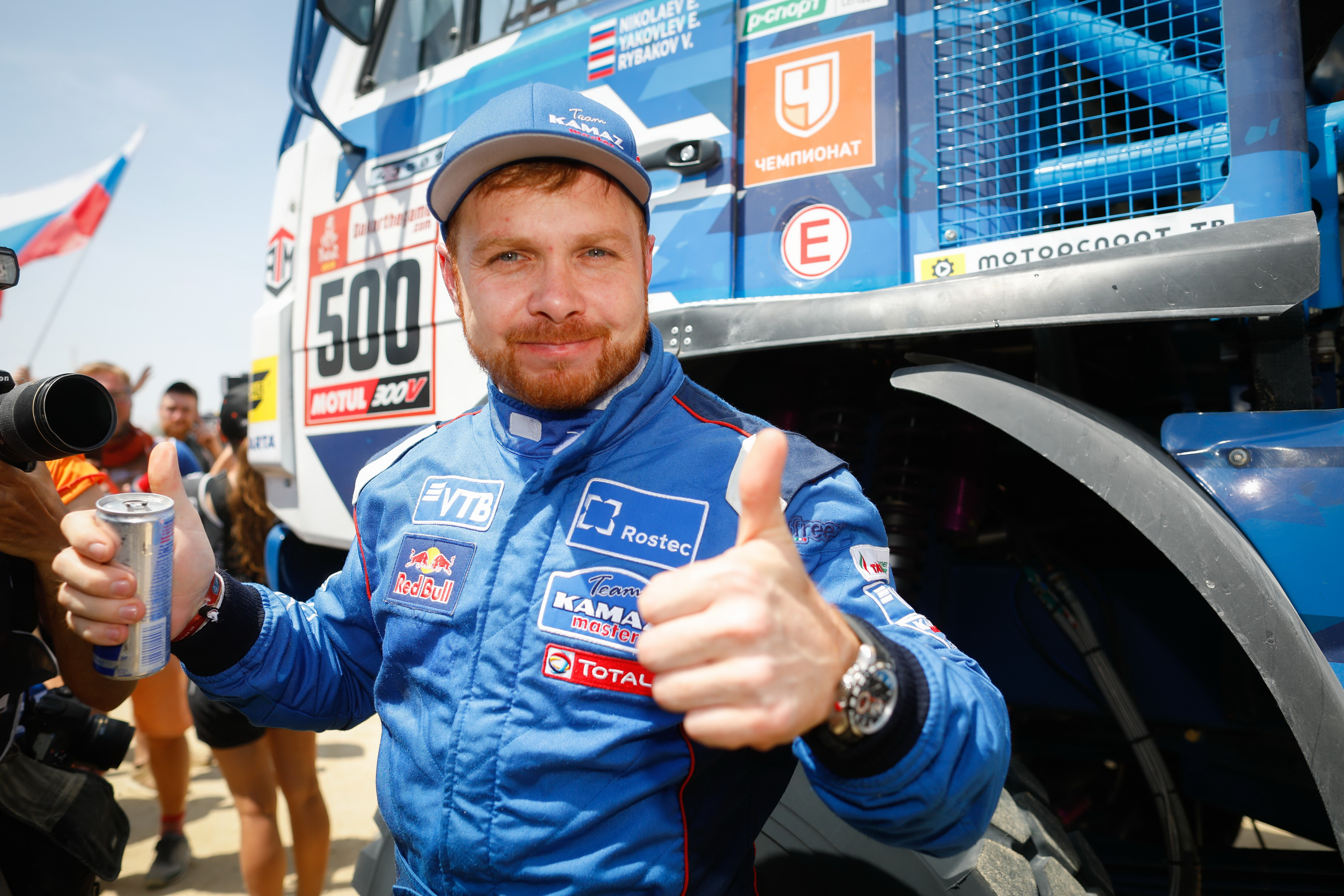
- Nikolaev in 2019
- Nationality: Russian
- Born: Eduard Valentinovich Nikolaev; 21 August 1984 (age 42)
- Debut season: 2011
- Current team: Kamaz-Master
- Wins: 5 (1 as co-driver)

Eduard Valentinovich Nikolaev (Russian: Эдуард Валентинович Николаев; born 21 August 1984) is a Russian rally raid driver, best known for winning the 2013 Dakar Rally, 2017 Dakar Rally, 2018 Dakar Rally and the 2019 Dakar Rally in the truck category for Kamaz.

== Career ==
Nikolaev made his Dakar debut in 2006 as mechanic for Kamaz's Sergey Reshetnikov, finishing in 18th overall, before moving across to the crew led by Ilgizar Mardeev in 2007. Along with Aydar Belyaev, the trio finished a creditable second place, three hours down on the winning time set by Hans Stacey.

For the 2009 edition, Nikolaev moved across to join multiple champion Vladimir Chagin and his co-driver Sergey Savostin, finishing second overall (with four stage victories) behind the crew led by another Kamaz driver, Firdaus Kabirov, by a margin of less than four minutes. In 2010, Nikolaev remained alongside Chagin and Savostin, the three dominating the year's competition by taking 9 of a possible 14 stage wins - a Dakar Rally record.

Nikolaev had his first taste of driving duties at the 2010 edition of the Silk Way Rally, which he won. The Russian proceeded to make his Dakar Rally driving debut in 2011, finishing third behind teammates Chagin and Kabirov, albeit over three hours down on the winning time.

The retirement of Chagin and Kabirov prior to the 2012 event theoretically made Nikolaev the Kamaz team leader, but he was nevertheless disqualified from the event for colliding with a competitor in the car category on the fourth stage. In 2013, Nikolaev profited from delays for rival and defending champion Gérard de Rooy, and despite failing to win a stage took victory in the overall classification by a margin of 37 minutes from Kamaz teammates Ayrat Mardeev and Andrey Karginov.

== Dakar Rally results ==
Year	Class	Vehicle	Position	Stages won
2006*	Trucks	(Russia) Kamaz	18th	0
2007*	Trucks	(Russia) Kamaz	2nd	0
2008	Event cancelled – replaced by the 2008 Central Europe Rally			
2009*	Trucks	(Russia) Kamaz	2nd	4
2010*	Trucks	(Russia) Kamaz	1st	9
2011	Trucks	(Russia) Kamaz	3rd	0
2012	Trucks	(Russia) Kamaz	DSQ	0
2013	Trucks	(Russia) Kamaz	1st	0
2014	Trucks	(Russia) Kamaz	3rd	1
2015	Trucks	(Russia) Kamaz	2nd	6
2016	Trucks	(Russia) Kamaz	7th	3
2017	Trucks	(Russia) Kamaz	1st	4
2018	Trucks	(Russia) Kamaz	1st	3
2019	Trucks	(Russia) Kamaz	1st	3
2020*	Trucks	(Russia) Kamaz	DNF*	0
2022	Trucks	(Russia) Kamaz	2nd	4

- 2006: co-driver for Sergey Reshetnikov
- 2007: co-driver for Ilgizar Mardeev
- 2009 and 2010: co-driver for Vladimir Chagin
- 2020: finished in the "Dakar Experience" category

== Winner ==
- Dakar Rally: 2010, 2013, 2017, 2018, 2019
- Silk Way Rally: 2010
- Khazar Steppes: 2010
- Russian Championship: 2012
- Kagan's Gold: 2012

== Awards ==
- 2006: Medal "For Valorous Labour"
- 2007: Medal of the "Order of Merit for the Motherland" II Degree
- 2010: Order of Friendship
- 2010: Merit badge "For the Service to the Town of Naberezhnye Chelny"
- 2011: "Merited Transport Worker of Tatarstan"
- 2014: Certificate of Honour by the Republic of Tatarstan
- 2014: Certificate of Honour by the President of Russia
- 2015: Gratitude by President of Tatarstan
- 2017: Medal of the "Order of Merit for Republic of Tatarstan"

Sporting positions
Preceded by Gerard de Rooy	Dakar Rally; Truck Winner; 2013	Succeeded by Andrey Karginov
Preceded by Gerard de Rooy	Dakar Rally; Truck Winner; 2017–2019	Succeeded by Andrey Karginov
