= Ayrat Mardeev =

Russian rally driver

Ayrat Ilgizarovich Mardeev (Russian: Айрат Ильгизарович Мардеев; born 1 January 1987) is a Russian rally raid truck driver. He won his first Dakar Rally title in 2015 driving a Kamaz.

Maardeev was born in Naberezhnye Chelny. His father was Ilgizar Mardeev, also a rally raid driver, who died in a quad bike accident on 24 August 2014.

== Dakar Rally results ==
Year	Class	Vehicle	Position	Stages won
2013	Trucks	(Russia) Kamaz	2nd	1
2014	Trucks	(Russia) Kamaz	DNF	1
2015	Trucks	(Russia) Kamaz	1st	2
2016	Trucks	(Russia) Kamaz	2nd	0
2017	Trucks	(Russia) Kamaz	5th	0
2018	Trucks	(Russia) Kamaz	3rd	1
2021	Trucks	(Russia) Kamaz	3rd	1

== Winner ==
- Dakar Rally: 2015
- Silk Way Rally: 2012, 2016
- Siberian Highway: 2011, 2012
- Russian Championship: 2013
- Kagan's Gold: 2014
- Great Steppe – Don: 2017

== Awards ==
- 2011: Letter of gratitude by Prime Minister of Tatarstan
- 2013: Medal "For Valorous Labour"
- 2015: "Merited Machinist of Tatarstan"
- 2017: "Merited Transport Worker of Tatarstan"

Sporting positions
Preceded by Andrey Karginov	Dakar Rally; Truck Winner; 2015	Succeeded by Gerard de Rooy
