= Moi Torrallardona =

Spanish Rally Driver

- Born: Moisès Torrallardona i Jou; September 13, 1966 (age 59) Castellfollit del Boix, Manresa, Spain
- Teams: Team De Rooy

Moisès Torrallardona i Jou (born on 13 September 1966 at Castellfollit del Boix, Manresa) is a Spanish off-road rally truck co-driver and navigator. It took part in the Camel Trophy 1990, celebrated in Siberia, USSR, where he finished on 4th position with the Spanish team.

== Career ==
Torrallardona was born on 13 September 1966 at Castellfollit del Boix, Manresa, Spain. He has participated on several editions of the Dakar Rally, most of them accompanying the truck driver Pep Vila, achieving his best result in the 2009 Dakar Rally, when they finished on the 7th position in the trucks general classification.

In 2010, since Vila decided not to participate in the Dakar, Torrallardona took the start in the rally on a new team, driving an Iveco truck of Gérard de Rooy, who did not compete because of an injury, together with the French pilot Joseph Adua and the Polish mechanic Darek Rodewald. They suffered three gearbox breakdowns, although they managed to continue on the roads and finish 3rd on four stages. They had to withdraw on 12th stage, while they were on 11th position in classification.

Together with Pep Vila (driver) and Marc Torres (mechanic) on a Mercedes-Benz truck, he finished 2nd on the 2008 Trans-oriental Rally, behind the team formed by Hans Stacey (driver), Charly Gotlib and Bernard der Kinderen, driving a MAN truck.

== Dakar Rally results ==
2004	2005	2006	2007	2008	2009	2010	2011
13th	12th	DNF	15th	DNS	7th	DNF	6th
