= Gerard de Rooy =

Dutch truck racer

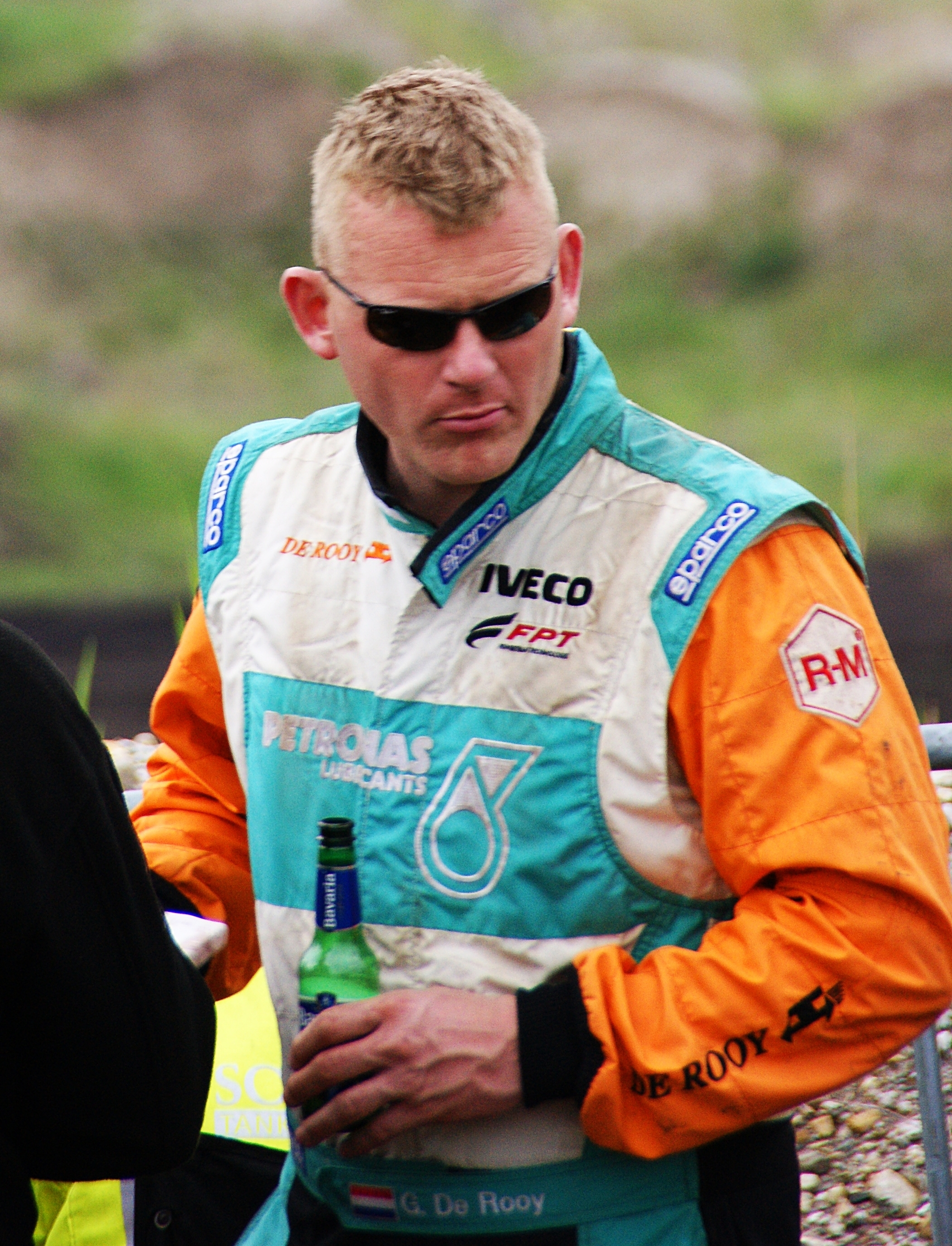
- Gerard de Rooy in 2013
- Nationality: Dutch
- Born: 21 June 1980 (age 46) Eindhoven, Netherlands
- Relatives: Jan de Rooy (father)

Gerard de Rooy (born 21 June 1980 in Eindhoven, Netherlands) is a Dutch truck racer, best known for participating in the Dakar Rally. In the 2009 edition he won three stages. He won the truck category race in 2012 and 2016. He is the son of successful rally raid driver Jan de Rooy.

== Notable results in Dakar Rally ==
- 2002
  - 6th trucks overall
- 2003
  - DNF (Did not finish) stage 12
- 2004
  - 3rd trucks overall
- 2005
  - 5th trucks overall
- 2006
  - DNS (Did not start)
- 2007
  - 1st, Stage 1
  - DNF stage 7
- 2009
  - 3rd trucks overall
  - 1st, Stage 2
  - 1st, Stage 4
  - 1st, Stage 8
- 2011
  - DNF stage 1
- 2012
  - 1st truck overall
  - 1st, Stage 2
  - 1st, Stage 4
  - 1st, Stage 5
  - 1st, Stage 7
  - 1st, Stage 12
- 2013
  - 4th truck overall
  - 1st, Stage 1
  - 1st, Stage 2
  - 1st, Stage 3
  - 1st, Stage 6
  - 1st, Stage 7
  - 1st, Stage 11
- 2014
  - 2nd truck overall
- 2015
  - 9th truck overall
- 2016
  - 1st truck overall
  - 1st, Stage 4
  - 1st, Stage 8
  - 1st, Stage 9

== Dakar Rally results ==
Year	Class	Vehicle	Position	Stages won
2002	Trucks	(Netherlands) DAF	6th	0
2003	Trucks	(Netherlands) DAF	DNF	5
2004	Trucks	(Netherlands) DAF	3rd	1
2005	Trucks	(Netherlands) DAF	5th	3
2006	Trucks	(Netherlands) DAF	DNS	-
2007	Trucks	(Netherlands) GINAF	DNF	1
2008	Event cancelled – replaced by the 2008 Central Europe Rally			
2009	Trucks	(Netherlands) GINAF	3rd	3
2010	Did Not Enter			
2011	Trucks	(Italy) Iveco	DNF	0
2012	Trucks	(Italy) Iveco	1st	5
2013	Trucks	(Italy) Iveco	4th	6
2014	Trucks	(Italy) Iveco	2nd	3
2015	Trucks	(Italy) Iveco	9th	0
2016	Trucks	(Italy) Iveco	1st	3
2017	Trucks	(Italy) Iveco	3rd	2
2018	Did Not Enter			
2019	Trucks	(Italy) Iveco	3rd	2

Sporting positions
Preceded by Vladimir Chagin	Dakar Rally; Truck Winner; 2012	Succeeded by Eduard Nikolaev
Preceded by Ayrat Mardeev	Dakar Rally; Truck Winner; 2016	Succeeded by Eduard Nikolaev
