= Olivier Pain =

French motorcycle racer

Olivier Pain (born 16 April 1981 in Niort) is a French rally-raid and enduro motorcycle rider, best known for his participation in the Dakar Rally.

== Career ==
Pain made his Dakar Rally debut in 2006, when he finished 28th overall riding a Yamaha before improving to 16th in 2007. He failed to finish the event in 2009, but recorded his first top-ten finish in the Dakar in 2010, finishing the event ninth overall, a result which led to him being signed by Yamaha's official team for the following season. In his first Dakar rally as a factory Yamaha rider in 2011, Pain broke his wrist whilst in contention for a podium finish, preventing him from finishing the rally. Pain repeated his ninth-place finish from two years previously in 2012, and secured a best ever finish of sixth the following year having led the overall classification for four stages before a navigational error on the eighth stage of the rally set him back.

After his tenth Dakar in 2016, Pain took a year off. For the 2018 Dakar, the 40th edition of the rally, he competed again, this time in the "Original" or "privateer" category, not directly supported by a manufacturer or team, and doing all maintenance on his motorcycle himself. In a translated interview on the official Dakar Rally web site, he said, "I have always admired the Dakar drivers without assistance. For me, it's a way to approach the race differently, to find the sensations of a first Dakar! I believe to be the first Elite driver to participate in motorcycle trunk after experiencing the comfort of an official structure. My passion for the rally is intact, I want to enjoy this 40th edition without the pressure of the ranking and reconnect with the origins of this event. I feel like a beginner ... "

Outside of the Dakar Rally, Pain has also won the Rally of Tunisia in 2008 and the 450cc category of the world rally-raid cup in 2009.
