= Statue of Ayrton Senna =

Statue in Wałbrzych, Poland

Ayrton Senna'a statue in Wałbrzych
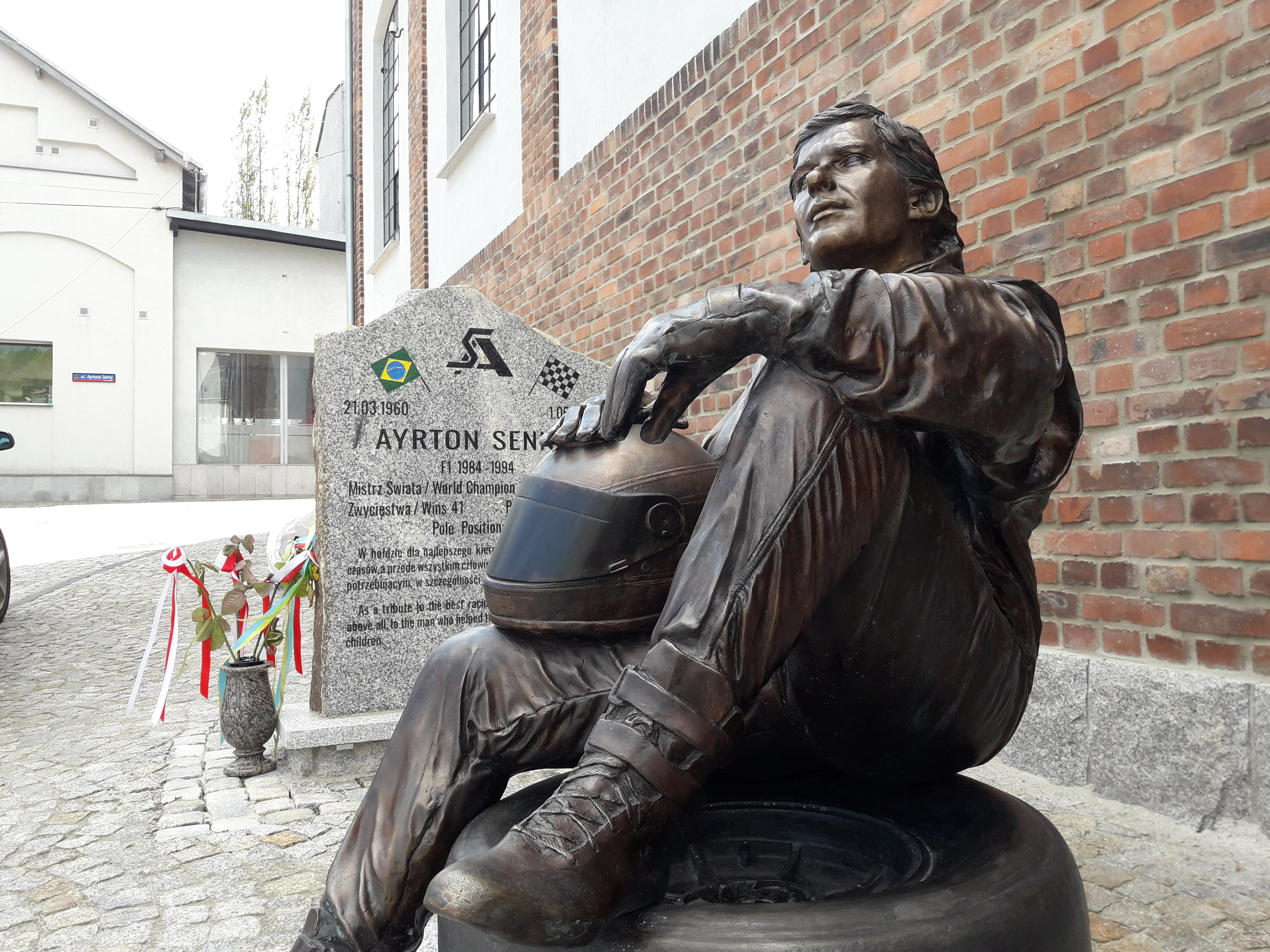
- Ayrton Senna's statue in Wałbrzych
- Interactive map of Ayrton Senna'a statue in Wałbrzych
- Location: Ayrton Senna's street in Wałbrzych
- Coordinates: 50°45′29″N 16°19′35″E
- Designer: Stefan Romecki (the design); Dmitrij Buławka-Fankidejski (sculpture)
- Type: Statue
- Material: Bronze
- Opening date: 18 September 2021; 4 years ago
- Dedicated to: Ayrton Senna

The statue of Ayrton Senna is a life-size bronze statue of Ayrton Senna in Wałbrzych, Poland, recalling him from the Hungaroring circuit. Senna is shown sitting, depicted on the tyre of a Formula 1 racing car.

== Location ==
The monument is located in Wałbrzych, Poland, on the street that bears his name, next to the Mining and Motorsports Museum.

== Opening of the statue ==
The grand opening of the statue took place on September 18, 2021, in Mining and Motorsports Museum in Wałbrzych.

The monument commemorating the Brazilian racing driver, three-time Formula 1 world champion, was erected on Ayrton Senna Street, which was officially named by the Wałbrzych City Council in 2015. The initiative was supported from the beginning by Mayor Roman Szełemej, who was present at the unveiling ceremony of the monument. It was attended by Hadil Fontes da Rocha Vianna, Ambassador of Brazil, and the prominent Polish racers including Sobiesław Zasada, Krzysztof Holowczyc, Maciej Wisławski, Maciej Szczepaniak, Rafał Sonik, Grzegorz Grzyb, Andrzej Kalitowicz.

== Design of the statue ==
Financed by Jerzy Mazur and the founders who support him, the monument refers to a memory from 1986 at the Hungaroring circuit. The initial concept of the statue that was born Jerzy Mazur's imagination - that is Senna depicted in a seated position - was drawn by Stefan Romecki, the Polish racer and graphic designer. The final design of the monument is credited to Dmitrij Buławka-Fankidejski - a sculptor with the Academy of Fine Arts in Gdansk - who undertook to create the sculpture.

== See also ==
- Death of Ayrton Senna
