= 2017 Dakar Rally =

Off-road motorsport event in South America

Part of the Dakar Rally
← Previous event	Next event →
- 2017 Dakar route
- Host country: Paraguay, Argentina and Bolivia
- Dates run: 2–14 January 2017
- Start: (Paraguay) Asunción
- Finish: (Argentina) Buenos Aires
- Stages: 12
- Stage surface: Gravel, dirt, sand
- Overall distance: 8,782.00 km (5,456.88 mi)

Results
- Cars winner: (France) Stéphane Peterhansel (France) Jean-Paul Cottret (France) Team Peugeot Total
- Bikes winner: (United Kingdom) Sam Sunderland (Austria) Red Bull KTM Factory Racing
- Quads winner: (Russia) Sergey Karyakin (Japan) Yamaha
- Trucks winner: (Russia) Eduard Nikolaev (Russia) Evgeny Yakovlev (Russia) Vladimir Rybakov (Russia) Kamaz-Master
- UTV's winner: (Brazil) Leandro Torres (Brazil) Lourival Roldan (United States) Polaris
- Crews: 317 at start, 227 at finish

The 2017 Dakar Rally was the 39th edition of the event and the ninth successive year that the event was held in South America. The event started in Asunción, Paraguay on January 2, then ran through Argentina and Bolivia, before returning to Buenos Aires on January 14 after 12 stages of competition. This year saw the introduction of the new UTV category.

== Entries ==
Stage	Bikes	Quads	Cars	Trucks	UTVs	Total
Start of rally	143	37	79	50	8	317
Rest day	111	25	64	45	5	249
End of rally	97 (68%)	22 (59%)	58 (73%)	45 (90%)	5 (63%)	227 (72%)

=== Bikes ===
Leading entries
Manufacturer	No.	Rider
(Austria) KTM	1	(Australia) Toby Price
(Austria) KTM	2	(Slovakia) Štefan Svitko
(Austria) KTM	8	(Spain) Gerard Farres Guell
(Austria) KTM	10	(Spain) Armand Monleon
(Austria) KTM	14	(United Kingdom) Sam Sunderland
(Austria) KTM	16	(Austria) Matthias Walkner
(Austria) KTM	19	(Spain) Laia Sanz
(Austria) KTM	20	(Slovakia) Ivan Jakes
(Austria) KTM	25	(Spain) Iván Cervantes
(Japan) Honda	9	(United States) Ricky Brabec
(Japan) Honda	11	(Spain) Joan Barreda
(Japan) Honda	15	(France) Michael Metge
(Japan) Honda	17	(Portugal) Paulo Gonçalves
(Japan) Yamaha	5	(Portugal) Hélder Rodrigues
(Japan) Yamaha	6	(France) Adrien Van Beveren
(Japan) Yamaha	18	(Italy) Alessandro Botturi
(Japan) Yamaha	23	(France) Xavier De Soultrait
(Japan) Yamaha	41	(Spain) Marc Solà Terradellas
(Japan) Yamaha	43	(Australia) Rodney Faggotter

=== Quads ===
Leading entries
Manufacturer	No.	Rider
(Japan) Yamaha	250	(Poland) Rafał Sonik
(Japan) Yamaha	251	(Chile) Ignacio Casale
(Japan) Yamaha	252	(Czech Republic) Jozef Macháček
(Japan) Yamaha	254	(Russia) Sergey Karyakin
(Japan) Yamaha	257	(Paraguay) Nelson Sanabria
(Japan) Yamaha	259	(France) Camélia Liparoti
(Japan) Yamaha	260	(France) Sebastian Souday
(Japan) Honda	256	(Bolivia) Walter Nosiglia
(Japan) Honda	258	(Argentina) Daniel Domasewski

=== Cars ===
Leading entries
Car	No.	Driver	Co-driver
(United States) Ford	311	(Spain) Xavier Pons	(Argentina) Ruben Garcia
(United States) Ford	321	(Czech Republic) Martin Prokop	(Austria) Ilka Minor-Petrasko
(United States) Ford	324	(Bolivia) Marco Bulacia	(Argentina) Claudio Bustos
(France) Peugeot	300	(France) Stephane Peterhansel	(France) Jean-Paul Cottret
(France) Peugeot	304	(Spain) Carlos Sainz	(Spain) Lucas Cruz
(France) Peugeot	307	(France) Cyril Despres	(France) David Castera
(France) Peugeot	309	(France) Sébastien Loeb	(Monaco) Daniel Elena
(France) Peugeot	318	(France) Romain Dumas	(France) Alain Guehennec
(France) Peugeot	319	(United Arab Emirates) Khalid Al-Qassimi	(France) Pascal Maimon
(United Kingdom) Mini	303	(Finland) Mikko Hirvonen	(France) Michel Périn
(United Kingdom) Mini	306	(Saudi Arabia) Yazeed Al-Rajhi	(Germany) Timo Gottschalk
(United Kingdom) Mini	308	(Argentina) Orlando Terranova	(Germany) Andreas Schulz
(United Kingdom) Mini	314	(Chile) Boris Garafulic	(Portugal) Filipe Palmeiro
(United Kingdom) Mini	316	(Poland) Jakub Przygonski	(Belgium) Tom Colsoul
(United Kingdom) Mini	322	(Qatar) Mohammed Abu-Issa	(France) Xavier Panseri
(United Kingdom) Mini	325	(Germany) Stephan Schott	(Portugal) Paulo Fiuza
(Japan) Toyota	301	(Qatar) Nasser Al-Attiyah	(France) Mathieu Baumel
(Japan) Toyota	302	(South Africa) Giniel de Villiers	(Germany) Dirk von Zitzewitz
(Japan) Toyota	305	(Spain) Nani Roma	(Spain) Alex Haro
(Japan) Toyota	310	(Netherlands) Erik Van Loon	(Netherlands) Wouter Rosegaar
(Japan) Toyota	317	(France) Ronan Chabot	(France) Gilles Pillot
(Japan) Toyota	320	(Zimbabwe) Conrad Rautenbach	(South Africa) Robert Howie
(Japan) Toyota	326	(Lithuania) Benediktas Vanagas	(Poland) Sebastien Rozwadowski
(Japan) Toyota	327	(France) Christian Lavieille	(France) Jean-Pierre Garcin
(Japan) Toyota	328	(Lithuania) Antanas Juknevičius	(Lithuania) Darius Vaiciulis

=== Trucks ===
Leading entries
Manufacturer	No.	Driver	Co-driver & mechanic	
(Italy) Iveco	500	(Netherlands) Gerard de Rooy	(Spain) Moisés Torrallardona	(Poland) Darek Rodewald
(Italy) Iveco	502	(Argentina) Federico Villagra	(Argentina) Adrian Yacopini	(Argentina) Ricardo Torlaschi
(Italy) Iveco	507	(Netherlands) Ton Van Genugten	(Netherlands) Anton Van Limpt	(Netherlands) Bernard Der Kinderen
(Russia) Kamaz	501	(Russia) Ayrat Mardeev	(Russia) Aydar Belyaev	(Russia) Dmitriy Svistunov
(Russia) Kamaz	505	(Russia) Eduard Nikolaev	(Russia) Evgeny Yakovlev	(Russia) Vladimir Rybakov
(Russia) Kamaz	513	(Russia) Dmitry Sotnikov	(Russia) Ruslan Akhamadeev	(Russia) Igor Leonov
(Russia) Kamaz	515	(Russia) Anton Shibalov	(Russia) Robert Amatych	(Russia) Ivan Romanov
(Czech Republic) Tatra	503	(Czech Republic) Aleš Loprais	(Czech Republic) Jiří Stross	(Czech Republic) Jan Tománek
(Czech Republic) Tatra	508	(Czech Republic) Martin Kolomý	(Czech Republic) René Kilián	(Czech Republic) David Kilián
(Germany) MAN	504	(Netherlands) Hans Stacey	(Belgium) Jan van der Vaet	(Netherlands) Hugo Kupper
(Germany) MAN	509	(Netherlands) Peter Versluis	(Germany) Artur Klein	(Netherlands) Marcel Pronk
(France) Renault Trucks	506	(Netherlands) Martin van den Brink	(Czech Republic) Daniel Kozlowsky	(Netherlands) Marcel Blankestijn
(France) Renault Trucks	510	(Netherlands) Pascal De Baar	(Netherlands) Martin Roesink	(Netherlands) Wouter De Graaff
(Belarus) MAZ	511	(Belarus) Siarhei Viazovich	(Belarus) Pavel Haranin	(Belarus) Andrei Zhyulin

== Stages ==
Distance according to the official website.

Stage	Date	Depart	Arrive	Bikes			Quads	Cars			Trucks			UTV's		
Stage	Date	Depart	Arrive	Km	Km	Winner	Winner	Km	Km	Winner	Km	Km	Winner	Km	Km	Winner
1	2 Jan	(Paraguay) Asunción	(Argentina) Resistencia	454	39	(Spain) J. Pedrero; Sherco TVS	(Brazil) M. Medeiros; Yamaha	454	39	(Qatar) N. Al-Attiyah; Toyota	454	39	(Czech Republic) M. Kolomý; Tatra	454	39	(Russia) R. Maganov; Polaris
2	3 Jan	(Argentina) Resistencia	(Argentina) San Miguel de Tucumán	803	275	(Australia) T. Price; KTM	(Argentina) P. Copetti; Yamaha	803	275	(France) S. Loeb; Peugeot	812	284	(Netherlands) M. van den Brink; Renault	803	275	(China) M. Ruijin; Polaris
3	4 Jan	(Argentina) San Miguel de Tucumán	(Argentina) San Salvador de Jujuy	780	364	(Spain) J. Barreda; Honda	(Bolivia) W. Nosiglia; Honda	780	364	(France) S. Peterhansel; Peugeot	757	199	(Russia) E. Nikolaev; Kamaz	780	364	(Brazil) L. Torres; Polaris
4	5 Jan	(Argentina) San Salvador de Jujuy	(Bolivia) Tupiza	521	416	(Austria) M. Walkner; KTM	(Bolivia) W. Nosiglia; Honda	521	416	(France) C. Despres; Peugeot	521	416	(Netherlands) G. de Rooy; Iveco	521	416	(China) M. Ruijin; Polaris
5	6 Jan	(Bolivia) Tupiza	(Bolivia) Oruro	692	~~447~~; 219	(United Kingdom) S. Sunderland; KTM	(Netherlands) K. Koolen; Barren	692	~~447~~; 219	(France) S. Loeb; Peugeot	683	~~438~~; 219	(Netherlands) G. de Rooy; Iveco	692	~~447~~; 219	(Russia) R. Maganov; Polaris
6	7 Jan	(Bolivia) Oruro	(Bolivia) La Paz	786	527	Stage 6 cancelled due to bad weather.		786	527	Stage cancelled	772	513	Stage cancelled	786	527	Stage cancelled
	8 Jan	(Bolivia) La Paz		Rest day												
7^{M}	9 Jan	(Bolivia) La Paz	(Bolivia) Uyuni	~~622~~; 801	~~322~~; 161	(United States) R. Brabec; Honda	(Russia) S. Karyakin; Yamaha	~~622~~; 801	~~322~~; 161	(France) S. Peterhansel; Peugeot	~~622~~; 801	~~322~~; 161	(Russia) D. Sotnikov; Kamaz	~~622~~; 801	~~322~~; 161	(Russia) R. Maganov; Polaris
8	10 Jan	(Bolivia) Uyuni	(Argentina) Salta	892	~~492~~; 419	(Spain) J. Barreda; Honda	(Chile) I. Casale; Yamaha	892	~~492~~; 419	(France) S. Loeb; Peugeot	892	~~429~~; 174	(Netherlands) M. van den Brink; Renault	892	~~429~~; 419	(China) L. Dongsheng; Polaris
9	11 Jan	(Argentina) Salta	(Argentina) Chilecito	977	406	Stage cancelled due to a landslide.		977	406	Stage cancelled	977	406	Stage cancelled	977	406	Stage cancelled
10	12 Jan	(Argentina) Chilecito	(Argentina) San Juan	751	449	(Spain) J. Barreda; Honda	(Russia) S. Karyakin; Yamaha	751	449	(France) S. Peterhansel; Peugeot	751	449	(Russia) E. Nikolaev; Kamaz	751	449	(China) W. Fujiang; Polaris
11	13 Jan	(Argentina) San Juan	(Argentina) Río Cuarto	754	288	(Spain) J. Barreda; Honda	(Russia) S. Karyakin; Yamaha	759	292	(France) S. Loeb; Peugeot	754	288	(Russia) E. Nikolaev; Kamaz	759	292	(Brazil) L. Torres; Polaris
12	14 Jan	(Argentina) Río Cuarto	(Argentina) Buenos Aires	786	64	(France) A. Van Beveren; Yamaha	(Chile) I. Casale; Yamaha	786	64	(France) S. Loeb; Peugeot	786	64	(Russia) E. Nikolaev; Kamaz	786	64	(Russia) R. Maganov; Polaris

Notes

- Stage 5 shortened due to bad weather (second timed sector cancelled).
- Stage 6 cancelled due to bad weather.
- Bad weather forced to change Stage 7 route.
- M: Marathon Stage (without assistance park at the end of the stage).
- Stage 8 shortened due to bad weather (and second timed sector cancelled for the trucks).
- Stage 9 cancelled due to a landslide.

== Stage results ==
=== Bikes ===
	Stage result					General classification				
Stage	Pos	Competitor	Make	Time	Gap	Pos	Competitor	Make	Time	Gap
1	1	(Spain) Juan Pedrero	Sherco	00:28:22		1	(Spain) Juan Pedrero	Sherco	00:28:22	
1	2	(United States) Ricky Brabec	Honda	00:28:34	00:00:12	2	(United States) Ricky Brabec	Honda	00:28:34	00:00:12
1	3	(Portugal) Paulo Gonçalves	Honda	00:28:48	00:00:26	3	(Portugal) Paulo Gonçalves	Honda	00:28:48	00:00:26
2	1	(Australia) Toby Price	KTM	02:37:32		1	(Australia) Toby Price	KTM	03:07:17	
2	2	(Portugal) Paulo Gonçalves	Honda	02:41:23	00:03:51	2	(Portugal) Paulo Gonçalves	Honda	03:10:11	00:02:54
2	3	(France) Xavier de Soultrait	Yamaha	02:41:38	00:04:06	3	(United Kingdom) Sam Sunderland	KTM	03:10:40	00:03:23
3	1	(Spain) Joan Barreda	Honda	04:23:30		1	(Spain) Joan Barreda	Honda	07:36:19	
3	2	(Chile) Pablo Quintanilla	Husqvarna	04:35:35	00:12:05	2	(United Kingdom) Sam Sunderland	KTM	07:46:34	00:10:15
3	3	(United Kingdom) Sam Sunderland	KTM	04:35:54	00:12:24	3	(Chile) Pablo Quintanilla	Husqvarna	07:47:18	00:10:59
4	1	(Austria) Matthias Walkner	KTM	04:57:22		1	(Chile) Pablo Quintanilla	Husqvarna	12:54:02	
4	2	(France) Xavier de Soultrait	Yamaha	05:03:20	00:05:58	2	(Austria) Matthias Walkner	KTM	12:56:09	00:02:07
4	3	(Chile) Pablo Quintanilla	Husqvarna	05:06:44	00:09:22	3	(United Kingdom) Sam Sunderland	KTM	13:00:14	00:06:12
5	1	(United Kingdom) Sam Sunderland	KTM	02:21:51		1	(United Kingdom) Sam Sunderland	KTM	15:22:05	
5	2	(Portugal) Paulo Gonçalves	Honda	02:28:58	00:07:07	2	(Chile) Pablo Quintanilla	Husqvarna	15:34:05	00:12:00
5	3	(France) Adrien Van Beveren	Yamaha	02:29:20	00:07:29	3	(France) Adrien Van Beveren	Yamaha	15:38:12	00:16:07
6	Stage cancelled									
Rest day
7	1	(United States) Ricky Brabec	Honda	02:02:05		1	(United Kingdom) Sam Sunderland	KTM	17:28:53	
7	2	(Portugal) Paulo Gonçalves	Honda	02:03:49	00:01:44	2	(Chile) Pablo Quintanilla	Husqvarna	17:46:38	00:17:45
7	3	(United Kingdom) Sam Sunderland	KTM	02:06:48	00:04:43	3	(France) Adrien Van Beveren	Yamaha	17:51:09	00:22:16
8	1	(Spain) Joan Barreda	Honda	04:28:21		1	(United Kingdom) Sam Sunderland	KTM	22:01:08	
8	2	(Austria) Matthias Walkner	KTM	04:32:12	00:03:51	2	(Chile) Pablo Quintanilla	Husqvarna	22:22:06	00:20:58
8	3	(United Kingdom) Sam Sunderland	KTM	04:32:15	00:03:54	3	(France) Adrien Van Beveren	Yamaha	22:29:57	00:28:49
9	Stage cancelled									
10	1	(Spain) Joan Barreda	Honda	05:49:45		1	(United Kingdom) Sam Sunderland	KTM	28:07:59	
10	2	(Slovakia) Štefan Svitko	KTM	05:50:09	00:00:24	2	(Austria) Matthias Walkner	KTM	28:38:00	00:30:01
10	3	(Argentina) Franco Caimi	Honda	05:53:33	00:03:48	3	(Spain) Gerard Farrés	KTM	28:46:42	00:38:43
11	1	(Spain) Joan Barreda	Honda	03:16:57		1	(United Kingdom) Sam Sunderland	KTM	31:34:11	
11	2	(Portugal) Paulo Gonçalves	Honda	03:18:47	00:01:50	2	(Austria) Matthias Walkner	KTM	32:07:20	00:33:09
11	3	(France) Adrien Van Beveren	Yamaha	03:22:25	00:05:28	3	(Spain) Gerard Farrés	KTM	32:11:33	00:37:22
12	1	(France) Adrien Van Beveren	Yamaha	00:30:29		1	(United Kingdom) Sam Sunderland	KTM	32:06:22	
12	2	(Spain) Gerard Farrés	KTM	00:30:29	00:00:00	2	(Austria) Matthias Walkner	KTM	32:38:22	00:32:00
12	3	(Spain) Joan Barreda	Honda	00:30:47	00:00:18	3	(Spain) Gerard Farrés	KTM	32:42:02	00:35:40

=== Quads ===
	Stage result					General classification				
Stage	Pos	Competitor	Make	Time	Gap	Pos	Competitor	Make	Time	Gap
1	1	(Brazil) Marcelo Medeiros	Yamaha	00:32:53		1	(Brazil) Marcelo Medeiros	Yamaha	00:32:53	
1	2	(Argentina) Gaston Gonzalez	Yamaha	00:33:55	00:01:02	2	(Argentina) Gaston Gonzalez	Yamaha	00:33:55	00:01:02
1	3	(Paraguay) Nelson Sanabria	Yamaha	00:34:32	00:01:39	3	(Paraguay) Nelson Sanabria	Yamaha	00:34:32	00:01:39
2	1	(Argentina) Pablo Copetti	Yamaha	03:14:29		1	(Argentina) Pablo Copetti	Yamaha	03:49:06	
2	2	(France) Axel Dutrie	Yamaha	03:20:00	00:05:31	2	(Brazil) Marcelo Medeiros	Yamaha	03:53:26	00:04:20
2	3	(Chile) Ignacio Casale	Yamaha	03:20:05	00:05:36	3	(France) Axel Dutrie	Yamaha	03:54:47	00:05:41
3	1	(Bolivia) Walter Nosiglia	Honda	05:37:03		1	(Chile) Ignacio Casale	Yamaha	09:39:26	
3	2	(Chile) Ignacio Casale	Yamaha	05:43:55	00:06:52	2	(France) Simon Vitse	Yamaha	09:51:42	00:12:16
3	3	(Argentina) Santiago Hansen	Honda	05:45:41	00:08:38	3	(France) Axel Dutrie	Yamaha	09:53:51	00:14:25
4	1	(Bolivia) Walter Nosiglia	Honda	06:06:22		1	(Russia) Sergey Karyakin	Yamaha	16:18:42	
4	2	(Russia) Sergey Karyakin	Yamaha	06:17:50	00:11:28	2	(Chile) Ignacio Casale	Yamaha	16:19:10	00:00:28
4	3	(Argentina) Daniel Domaszewski	Honda	06:25:34	00:19:12	3	(France) Simon Vitse	Yamaha	16:21:42	00:03:00
5	1	(Netherlands) Kees Koolen	Barren	02:57:43		1	(France) Simon Vitse	Yamaha	19:32:22	
5	2	(Argentina) Gustavo Gallego	Yamaha	03:09:49	00:12:06	2	(Russia) Sergey Karyakin	Yamaha	19:40:36	00:08:14
5	3	(France) Simon Vitse	Yamaha	03:10:40	00:12:57	3	(France) Axel Dutrie	Yamaha	19:42:57	00:10:35
6	Stage cancelled									
Rest day
7	1	(Russia) Sergey Karyakin	Yamaha	02:32:49		1	(Russia) Sergey Karyakin	Yamaha	22:13:25	
7	2	(France) Axel Dutrie	Yamaha	02:35:48	00:02:59	2	(France) Simon Vitse	Yamaha	22:18:41	00:05:16
7	3	(Chile) Ignacio Casale	Yamaha	02:42:25	00:09:36	3	(France) Axel Dutrie	Yamaha	22:18:45	00:05:20
8	1	(Chile) Ignacio Casale	Yamaha	05:26:46		1	(Russia) Sergey Karyakin	Yamaha	27:45:50	
8	2	(Russia) Sergey Karyakin	Yamaha	05:32:25	00:05:39	2	(France) Axel Dutrie	Yamaha	27:52:47	00:06:57
8	3	(France) Axel Dutrie	Yamaha	05:34:02	00:07:16	3	(Chile) Ignacio Casale	Yamaha	27:56:09	00:10:19
9	Stage cancelled									
10	1	(Russia) Sergey Karyakin	Yamaha	06:52:43		1	(Russia) Sergey Karyakin	Yamaha	34:38:33	
10	2	(Chile) Ignacio Casale	Yamaha	07:03:29	00:10:46	2	(Chile) Ignacio Casale	Yamaha	34:59:38	00:21:05
10	3	(Argentina) Santiago Hansen	Honda	08:19:09	01:26:06	3	(France) Axel Dutrie	Yamaha	37:45:24	03:06:51
11	1	(Russia) Sergey Karyakin	Yamaha	03:58:22		1	(Russia) Sergey Karyakin	Yamaha	38:36:55	
11	2	(Argentina) Daniel Domaszewski	Honda	04:19:03	00:20:41	2	(Chile) Ignacio Casale	Yamaha	39:53:19	01:16:24
11	3	(Poland) Rafał Sonik	Yamaha	04:22:11	00:23:49	3	(Argentina) Pablo Copetti	Yamaha	42:58:01	04:21:06
12	1	(Chile) Ignacio Casale	Yamaha	00:40:24		1	(Russia) Sergey Karyakin	Yamaha	39:18:52	
12	2	(Argentina) Daniel Domaszewski	Honda	00:41:06	00:00:42	2	(Chile) Ignacio Casale	Yamaha	40:33:43	01:14:51
12	3	(Argentina) Pablo Copetti	Yamaha	00:41:10	00:00:46	3	(Argentina) Pablo Copetti	Yamaha	43:39:11	04:20:19

=== Cars ===
	Stage result					General classification				
Stage	Pos	Competitor	Make	Time	Gap	Pos	Competitor	Make	Time	Gap
1	1	(Qatar) Nasser Al-Attiyah (France) Matthieu Baumel	Toyota	00:25:41		1	(Qatar) Nasser Al-Attiyah (France) Matthieu Baumel	Toyota	00:25:41	
1	2	(Spain) Xavier Pons (Argentina) Ruben Garcia	Ford	00:26:05	00:00:24	2	(Spain) Xavier Pons (Argentina) Ruben Garcia	Ford	00:26:05	00:00:24
1	3	(Spain) Nani Roma (Spain) Alex Haro	Toyota	00:26:10	00:00:29	3	(Spain) Nani Roma (Spain) Alex Haro	Toyota	00:26:10	00:00:29
2	1	(France) Sébastien Loeb (Monaco) Daniel Elena	Peugeot	02:06:55		1	(France) Sébastien Loeb (Monaco) Daniel Elena	Peugeot	02:33:31	
2	2	(Qatar) Nasser Al-Attiyah (France) Matthieu Baumel	Toyota	02:08:18	00:01:23	2	(Qatar) Nasser Al-Attiyah (France) Matthieu Baumel	Toyota	02:33:59	00:00:28
2	3	(Spain) Carlos Sainz (Spain) Lucas Cruz	Peugeot	02:09:13	00:02:18	3	(Spain) Carlos Sainz (Spain) Lucas Cruz	Peugeot	02:35:27	00:01:56
3	1	(France) Stéphane Peterhansel (France) Jean-Paul Cottret	Peugeot	04:18:17		1	(France) Sébastien Loeb (Monaco) Daniel Elena	Peugeot	06:54:56	
3	2	(Spain) Carlos Sainz (Spain) Lucas Cruz	Peugeot	04:20:11	00:01:54	2	(Spain) Carlos Sainz (Spain) Lucas Cruz	Peugeot	06:55:38	00:00:42
3	3	(France) Sébastien Loeb (Monaco) Daniel Elena	Peugeot	04:21:25	00:03:08	3	(France) Stéphane Peterhansel (France) Jean-Paul Cottret	Peugeot	06:59:14	00:04:18
4	1	(France) Cyril Despres (France) David Castera	Peugeot	04:22:55		1	(France) Cyril Despres (France) David Castera	Peugeot	11:33:16	
4	2	(Finland) Mikko Hirvonen (France) Michel Périn	Mini	04:33:46	00:10:51	2	(France) Stéphane Peterhansel (France) Jean-Paul Cottret	Peugeot	11:37:24	00:04:08
4	3	(Spain) Nani Roma (Spain) Alex Haro	Toyota	04:35:46	00:12:51	3	(Finland) Mikko Hirvonen (France) Michel Périn	Mini	11:38:20	00:05:04
5	1	(France) Sébastien Loeb (Monaco) Daniel Elena	Peugeot	02:24:03		1	(France) Stéphane Peterhansel (France) Jean-Paul Cottret	Peugeot	14:02:58	
5	2	(Spain) Nani Roma (Spain) Alex Haro	Toyota	02:24:47	00:00:44	2	(France) Sébastien Loeb (Monaco) Daniel Elena	Peugeot	14:04:07	00:01:09
5	3	(France) Stéphane Peterhansel (France) Jean-Paul Cottret	Peugeot	02:25:34	00:01:31	3	(France) Cyril Despres (France) David Castera	Peugeot	14:07:52	00:04:54
6	Stage cancelled									
Rest day
7	1	(France) Stéphane Peterhansel (France) Jean-Paul Cottret	Peugeot	01:54:08		1	(France) Stéphane Peterhansel (France) Jean-Paul Cottret	Peugeot	15:57:06	
7	2	(France) Sébastien Loeb (Monaco) Daniel Elena	Peugeot	01:54:56	00:00:48	2	(France) Sébastien Loeb (Monaco) Daniel Elena	Peugeot	15:59:03	00:01:57
7	3	(South Africa) Giniel de Villiers (Germany) Dirk von Zitzewitz	Toyota	01:57:41	00:03:33	3	(Spain) Nani Roma (Spain) Alex Haro	Toyota	16:08:13	00:11:07
8	1	(France) Sébastien Loeb (Monaco) Daniel Elena	Peugeot	04:11:02		1	(France) Sébastien Loeb (Monaco) Daniel Elena	Peugeot	20:10:05	
8	2	(France) Stéphane Peterhansel (France) Jean-Paul Cottret	Peugeot	04:14:37	00:03:35	2	(France) Stéphane Peterhansel (France) Jean-Paul Cottret	Peugeot	20:11:43	00:01:38
8	3	(France) Cyril Despres (France) David Castera	Peugeot	04:16:15	00:05:13	3	(France) Cyril Despres (France) David Castera	Peugeot	20:27:22	00:17:17
9	Stage cancelled									
10	1	(France) Stéphane Peterhansel (France) Jean-Paul Cottret	Peugeot	04:47:00		1	(France) Stéphane Peterhansel (France) Jean-Paul Cottret	Peugeot	24:58:43	
10	2	(France) Sébastien Loeb (Monaco) Daniel Elena	Peugeot	04:54:28	00:07:28	2	(France) Sébastien Loeb (Monaco) Daniel Elena	Peugeot	25:04:33	00:05:50
10	3	(France) Cyril Despres (France) David Castera	Peugeot	04:57:01	00:10:01	3	(France) Cyril Despres (France) David Castera	Peugeot	25:24:23	00:25:40
11	1	(France) Sébastien Loeb (Monaco) Daniel Elena	Peugeot	03:21:15		1	(France) Stéphane Peterhansel (France) Jean-Paul Cottret	Peugeot	28:20:16	
11	2	(France) Stéphane Peterhansel (France) Jean-Paul Cottret	Peugeot	03:21:33	00:00:18	2	(France) Sébastien Loeb (Monaco) Daniel Elena	Peugeot	28:25:48	00:05:32
11	3	(Argentina) Orlando Terranova (Germany) Andreas Schulz	Mini	03:27:52	00:06:37	3	(France) Cyril Despres (France) David Castera	Peugeot	28:53:10	00:32:54
12	1	(France) Sébastien Loeb (Monaco) Daniel Elena	Peugeot	00:28:55		1	(France) Stéphane Peterhansel (France) Jean-Paul Cottret	Peugeot	28:49:30	
12	2	(France) Stéphane Peterhansel (France) Jean-Paul Cottret	Peugeot	00:29:14	00:00:19	2	(France) Sébastien Loeb (Monaco) Daniel Elena	Peugeot	28:54:43	00:05:13
12	3	(South Africa) Giniel de Villiers (Germany) Dirk von Zitzewitz	Toyota	00:29:25	00:00:30	3	(France) Cyril Despres (France) David Castera	Peugeot	29:22:58	00:33:28

=== Trucks ===
	Stage result					General classification				
Stage	Pos	Competitor	Make	Time	Gap	Pos	Competitor	Make	Time	Gap
1	1	(Czech Republic) Martin Kolomý (Czech Republic) Rene Kilian (Czech Republic) David Kilian	Tatra	00:30:00		1	(Czech Republic) Martin Kolomý (Czech Republic) Rene Kilian (Czech Republic) David Kilian	Tatra	00:30:00	
1	2	(Netherlands) Ton van Genugten (Netherlands) Anton Van Limpt (Netherlands) Bernard Der Kinderen	Iveco	00:30:13	00:00:13	2	(Netherlands) Ton van Genugten (Netherlands) Anton Van Limpt (Netherlands) Bernard Der Kinderen	Iveco	00:30:13	00:00:13
1	3	(Netherlands) Martin van den Brink (Czech Republic) Daniel Kozlowsky (Netherlands) Marcel Blankestijn	Renault	00:30:25	00:00:25	3	(Netherlands) Martin van den Brink (Czech Republic) Daniel Kozlowsky (Netherlands) Marcel Blankestijn	Renault	00:30:25	00:00:25
2	1	(Netherlands) Martin van den Brink (Czech Republic) Daniel Kozlowsky (Netherlands) Marcel Blankestijn	Renault	02:37:08		1	(Netherlands) Martin van den Brink (Czech Republic) Daniel Kozlowsky (Netherlands) Marcel Blankestijn	Renault	03:07:33	
2	2	(Russia) Dmitry Sotnikov (Russia) Ruslan Akhmadeev (Russia) Igor Leonov	Kamaz	02:39:11	00:02:03	2	(Russia) Dmitry Sotnikov (Russia) Ruslan Akhmadeev (Russia) Igor Leonov	Kamaz	03:10:42	00:03:09
2	3	(Netherlands) Peter Versluis (Germany) Artur Klein (Netherlands) Marcel Pronk	MAN	02:40:00	00:02:52	3	(Czech Republic) Martin Kolomý (Czech Republic) Rene Kilian (Czech Republic) David Kilian	Tatra	03:10:44	00:03:11
3	1	(Russia) Eduard Nikolaev (Russia) Evgeny Yakovlev (Russia) Vladimir Rybakov	Kamaz	02:45:41		1	(Russia) Eduard Nikolaev (Russia) Evgeny Yakovlev (Russia) Vladimir Rybakov	Kamaz	05:57:56	
3	2	(Czech Republic) Martin Kolomý (Czech Republic) Rene Kilian (Czech Republic) David Kilian	Tatra	02:49:39	00:03:48	2	(Czech Republic) Martin Kolomý (Czech Republic) Rene Kilian (Czech Republic) David Kilian	Tatra	06:00:23	00:02:27
3	3	(Argentina) Federico Villagra (Argentina) Adrian Yacopini (Argentina) Ricardo Torlaschi	Iveco	02:50:24	00:04:33	3	(Argentina) Federico Villagra (Argentina) Adrian Yacopini (Argentina) Ricardo Torlaschi	Iveco	06:02:03	00:04:07
4	1	(Netherlands) Gerard de Rooy (Spain) Moisès Torrallardona (Poland) Darek Rodewald	Iveco	04:55:55		1	(Russia) Dmitry Sotnikov (Russia) Ruslan Akhmadeev (Russia) Igor Leonov	Kamaz	11:12:40	
4	2	(Russia) Ayrat Mardeev (Russia) Aydar Belyaev (Russia) Dmitriy Svistunov	Kamaz	04:56:25	00:00:30	2	(Argentina) Federico Villagra (Argentina) Adrian Yacopini (Argentina) Ricardo Torlaschi	Iveco	11:14:35	00:01:55
4	3	(Russia) Anton Shibalov (Russia) Robert Amatych (Russia) Ivan Romanov	Kamaz	04:59:02	00:03:07	3	(Russia) Eduard Nikolaev (Russia) Evgeny Yakovlev (Russia) Vladimir Rybakov	Kamaz	11:17:20	00:04:40
5	1	(Netherlands) Gerard de Rooy (Spain) Moisès Torrallardona (Poland) Darek Rodewald	Iveco	02:39:12		1	(Netherlands) Gerard de Rooy (Spain) Moisès Torrallardona (Poland) Darek Rodewald	Iveco	14:06:07	
5	2	(Russia) Eduard Nikolaev (Russia) Evgeny Yakovlev (Russia) Vladimir Rybakov	Kamaz	02:51:10	00:11:58	2	(Russia) Eduard Nikolaev (Russia) Evgeny Yakovlev (Russia) Vladimir Rybakov	Kamaz	14:08:30	00:02:23
5	3	(Russia) Ayrat Mardeev (Russia) Aydar Belyaev (Russia) Dmitriy Svistunov	Kamaz	02:53:16	00:14:04	3	(Russia) Dmitry Sotnikov (Russia) Ruslan Akhmadeev (Russia) Igor Leonov	Kamaz	14:12:43	00:06:36
6	Stage cancelled									
Rest day
7	1	(Russia) Dmitry Sotnikov (Russia) Ruslan Akhmadeev (Russia) Igor Leonov	Kamaz	01:41:35		1	(Netherlands) Gerard de Rooy (Spain) Moisès Torrallardona (Poland) Darek Rodewald	Iveco	15:52:07	
7	2	(Netherlands) Ton van Genugten (Netherlands) Anton Van Limpt (Netherlands) Bernard Der Kinderen	Iveco	01:44:26	00:02:51	2	(Russia) Dmitry Sotnikov (Russia) Ruslan Akhmadeev (Russia) Igor Leonov	Kamaz	15:54:18	00:02:11
7	3	(Argentina) Federico Villagra (Argentina) Adrian Yacopini (Argentina) Ricardo Torlaschi	Iveco	01:45:12	00:03:37	3	(Russia) Eduard Nikolaev (Russia) Evgeny Yakovlev (Russia) Vladimir Rybakov	Kamaz	15:58:04	00:05:57
8	1	(Netherlands) Martin van den Brink (Czech Republic) Daniel Kozlowsky (Netherlands) Marcel Blankestijn	Renault	01:55:20		1	(Russia) Dmitry Sotnikov (Russia) Ruslan Akhmadeev (Russia) Igor Leonov	Kamaz	17:52:20	
8	2	(Argentina) Federico Villagra (Argentina) Adrian Yacopini (Argentina) Ricardo Torlaschi	Iveco	01:55:37	00:00:17	2	(Russia) Eduard Nikolaev (Russia) Evgeny Yakovlev (Russia) Vladimir Rybakov	Kamaz	17:54:06	00:01:46
8	3	(Russia) Eduard Nikolaev (Russia) Evgeny Yakovlev (Russia) Vladimir Rybakov	Kamaz	01:56:02	00:00:42	3	(Netherlands) Gerard de Rooy (Spain) Moisès Torrallardona (Poland) Darek Rodewald	Iveco	17:54:40	00:02:20
9	Stage cancelled									
10	1	(Russia) Eduard Nikolaev (Russia) Evgeny Yakovlev (Russia) Vladimir Rybakov	Kamaz	05:33:06		1	(Russia) Eduard Nikolaev (Russia) Evgeny Yakovlev (Russia) Vladimir Rybakov	Kamaz	23:27:12	
10	2	(Russia) Dmitry Sotnikov (Russia) Ruslan Akhmadeev (Russia) Igor Leonov	Kamaz	05:40:07	00:07:01	2	(Russia) Dmitry Sotnikov (Russia) Ruslan Akhmadeev (Russia) Igor Leonov	Kamaz	23:32:27	00:05:15
10	3	(Russia) Ayrat Mardeev (Russia) Aydar Belyaev (Russia) Dmitriy Svistunov	Kamaz	05:40:47	00:07:41	3	(Netherlands) Gerard de Rooy (Spain) Moisès Torrallardona (Poland) Darek Rodewald	Iveco	23:51:29	00:24:17
11	1	(Russia) Eduard Nikolaev (Russia) Evgeny Yakovlev (Russia) Vladimir Rybakov	Kamaz	03:56:47		1	(Russia) Eduard Nikolaev (Russia) Evgeny Yakovlev (Russia) Vladimir Rybakov	Kamaz	27:23:59	
11	2	(Argentina) Federico Villagra (Argentina) Adrian Yacopini (Argentina) Ricardo Torlaschi	Iveco	03:57:39	00:00:52	2	(Russia) Dmitry Sotnikov (Russia) Ruslan Akhmadeev (Russia) Igor Leonov	Kamaz	27:41:08	00:17:09
11	3	(Russia) Ayrat Mardeev (Russia) Aydar Belyaev (Russia) Dmitriy Svistunov	Kamaz	04:06:40	00:09:53	3	(Netherlands) Gerard de Rooy (Spain) Moisès Torrallardona (Poland) Darek Rodewald	Iveco	28:02:57	00:38:58
12	1	(Russia) Eduard Nikolaev (Russia) Evgeny Yakovlev (Russia) Vladimir Rybakov	Kamaz	00:34:25		1	(Russia) Eduard Nikolaev (Russia) Evgeny Yakovlev (Russia) Vladimir Rybakov	Kamaz	27:58:24	
12	2	(Russia) Ayrat Mardeev (Russia) Aydar Belyaev (Russia) Dmitriy Svistunov	Kamaz	00:34:58	00:00:33	2	(Russia) Dmitry Sotnikov (Russia) Ruslan Akhmadeev (Russia) Igor Leonov	Kamaz	28:17:22	00:18:58
12	3	(Argentina) Federico Villagra (Argentina) Adrian Yacopini (Argentina) Ricardo Torlaschi	Iveco	00:35:50	00:01:25	3	(Netherlands) Gerard de Rooy (Spain) Moisès Torrallardona (Poland) Darek Rodewald	Iveco	28:39:43	00:41:19

=== UTV's ===
	Stage result					General classification				
Stage	Pos	Competitors	Make	Time	Gap	Pos	Competitors	Make	Time	Gap
1	1	(Russia) Ravil Maganov (Russia) Kirill Shubin	Polaris	00:34:32		1	(Russia) Ravil Maganov (Russia) Kirill Shubin	Polaris	00:34:32	
1	2	(Spain) Santiago Navarro (Spain) Oriol Vidal	Yamaha	00:35:13	00:00:41	2	(Spain) Santiago Navarro (Spain) Oriol Vidal	Yamaha	00:35:13	00:00:41
1	3	(Brazil) Leandro Torres (Brazil) Lourival Roldan	Polaris	00:35:25	00:00:53	3	(Brazil) Leandro Torres (Brazil) Lourival Roldan	Polaris	00:35:25	00:00:53
2	1	(China) Mao Ruijin (France) Sebastien Delaunay	Polaris	03:46:58		1	(China) Mao Ruijin (France) Sebastien Delaunay	Polaris	04:26:29	
2	2	(China) Li Dongsheng (China) Quanquan Guan	Polaris	04:45:16	00:58:18	2	(China) Li Dongsheng (China) Quanquan Guan	Polaris	05:21:53	00:55:24
2	3	(Brazil) Leandro Torres (Brazil) Lourival Roldan	Polaris	05:54:25	02:07:27	3	(Brazil) Leandro Torres (Brazil) Lourival Roldan	Polaris	06:29:50	02:03:21
3	1	(Brazil) Leandro Torres (Brazil) Lourival Roldan	Polaris	7:25:28		1	(China) Mao Ruijin (France) Sebastien Delaunay	Polaris	11:53:39	
3	2	(China) Mao Ruijin (France) Sebastien Delaunay	Polaris	7:27:10	00:01:42	2	(Brazil) Leandro Torres (Brazil) Lourival Roldan	Polaris	13:55:18	02:01:39
3	3	(Spain) Santiago Navarro (Spain) Oriol Vidal	Yamaha	9:31:14	02:05:46	3	(China) Li Dongsheng (China) Quanquan Guan	Polaris	15:23:38	03:29:59
4	1	(China) Mao Ruijin (France) Sebastien Delaunay	Polaris	07:08:04		1	(China) Mao Ruijin (France) Sebastien Delaunay	Polaris	19:01:43	
4	2	(Brazil) Leandro Torres (Brazil) Lourival Roldan	Polaris	07:08:34	00:00:30	2	(Brazil) Leandro Torres (Brazil) Lourival Roldan	Polaris	21:03:52	02:02:09
4	3	(China) Wang Fujiang (China) Li Wei	Polaris	08:08:50	01:00:46	3	(China) Li Dongsheng (China) Quanquan Guan	Polaris	23:40:37	04:38:54
5	1	(Russia) Ravil Maganov (Russia) Kirill Shubin	Polaris	03:48:38		1	(Brazil) Leandro Torres (Brazil) Lourival Roldan	Polaris	25:22:24	
5	2	(Brazil) Leandro Torres (Brazil) Lourival Roldan	Polaris	04:18:32	00:29:54	2	(China) Mao Ruijin (France) Sebastien Delaunay	Polaris	27:56:28	02:34:04
5	3	(China) Li Dongsheng (China) Quanquan Guan	Polaris	04:29:12	00:40:34	3	(China) Li Dongsheng (China) Quanquan Guan	Polaris	28:09:49	02:47:25
6	Stage cancelled									
Rest day
7	1	(Russia) Ravil Maganov (Russia) Kirill Shubin	Polaris	03:02:09		1	(Brazil) Leandro Torres (Brazil) Lourival Roldan	Polaris	28:29:32	
7	2	(China) Li Dongsheng (China) Quanquan Guan	Polaris	03:02:56	00:00:47	2	(China) Mao Ruijin (France) Sebastien Delaunay	Polaris	31:02:57	02:33:25
7	3	(China) Mao Ruijin (France) Sebastien Delaunay	Polaris	03:06:29	00:04:20	3	(China) Li Dongsheng (China) Quanquan Guan	Polaris	31:12:45	02:43:13
8	1	(China) Li Dongsheng (China) Quanquan Guan	Polaris	06:30:15		1	(Brazil) Leandro Torres (Brazil) Lourival Roldan	Polaris	36:07:48	
8	2	(Brazil) Leandro Torres (Brazil) Lourival Roldan	Polaris	06:38:16	00:08:01	2	(China) Li Dongsheng (China) Quanquan Guan	Polaris	37:43:00	01:35:12
8	3	(Russia) Ravil Maganov (Russia) Kirill Shubin	Polaris	06:51:01	00:20:46	3	(China) Mao Ruijin (France) Sebastien Delaunay	Polaris	38:44:06	02:36:18
9	Stage cancelled									
10	1	(China) Wang Fujiang (China) Li Wei	Polaris	9:04:52		1	(Brazil) Leandro Torres (Brazil) Lourival Roldan	Polaris	48:09:50	
10	2	(Russia) Ravil Maganov (Russia) Kirill Shubin	Polaris	9:47:57	0:43:05	2	(Russia) Ravil Maganov (Russia) Kirill Shubin	Polaris	50:55:18	2:45:28
10	3	(Brazil) Leandro Torres (Brazil) Lourival Roldan	Polaris	12:02:02	2:57:10	3	(China) Wang Fujiang (China) Li Wei	Polaris	52:12:26	4:02:36
11	1	(Brazil) Leandro Torres (Brazil) Lourival Roldan	Polaris	5:05:14		1	(Brazil) Leandro Torres (Brazil) Lourival Roldan	Polaris	53:15:04	
11	2	(China) Wang Fujiang (China) Li Wei	Polaris	5:44:33	0:39:19	2	(China) Wang Fujiang (China) Li Wei	Polaris	57:56:59	4:41:55
11	3	(Russia) Ravil Maganov (Russia) Kirill Shubin	Polaris	8:29:32	3:24:18	3	(Russia) Ravil Maganov (Russia) Kirill Shubin	Polaris	59:24:50	6:09:46
12	1	(Russia) Ravil Maganov (Russia) Kirill Shubin	Polaris	0:42:35		1	(Brazil) Leandro Torres (Brazil) Lourival Roldan	Polaris	54:01:50	
12	2	(China) Mao Ruijin (France) Sebastien Delaunay	Polaris	0:43:39	0:01:04	2	(China) Wang Fujiang (China) Li Wei	Polaris	58:44:24	4:42:34
12	3	(Brazil) Leandro Torres (Brazil) Lourival Roldan	Polaris	0:46:46	0:04:11	3	(Russia) Ravil Maganov (Russia) Kirill Shubin	Polaris	60:07:25	6:05:35

== Final standings ==
=== Bikes ===
Pos	No.	Rider	Bike	Entrant	Time	Gap
1	14	(United Kingdom) Sam Sunderland	KTM 450 Rally	Red Bull KTM Factory Team	32:06:22	
2	16	(Austria) Matthias Walkner	KTM 450 Rally	Red Bull KTM Factory Team	32:38:22	+ 00:32:00
3	8	(Spain) Gerard Farrés	KTM 450 Rally	Himoinsa Dakar Team	32:42:02	+ 00:35:40
4	6	(France) Adrien Van Beveren	Yamaha	Yamalube Yamaha Official Rally Team	32:42:50	+ 00:36:28
5	11	(Spain) Joan Barreda	Honda	Monster Energy Honda Team	32:49:30	+ 00:43:08
6	17	(Portugal) Paulo Gonçalves	Honda	Monster Energy Honda Team	32:58:51	+ 00:52:29
7	31	(France) Pierre-Alexandre Renet	Husqvarna	Rockstar Energy Husqvarna Factory Team	33:03:57	+ 00:57:35
8	67	(Argentina) Franco Caimi	Honda	Honda South America Rally Team	33:48:40	+ 01:42:18
9	5	(Portugal) Hélder Rodrigues	Yamaha	Yamalube Yamaha Official Rally Team	34:09:28	+ 02:03:06
10	27	(Portugal) Joaquim Rodrigues	Speedbrain	Hero Motorsports Team Rally	34:30:46	+ 02:24:24

=== Quads ===
Pos	No.	Rider	Quad	Time	Gap
1	254	(Russia) Sergey Karyakin	Yamaha	39:18:52	
2	251	(Chile) Ignacio Casale	Yamaha	40:33:43	+ 01:14:51
3	263	(Argentina) Pablo Copetti	Yamaha	43:39:11	+ 04:20:19
4	250	(Poland) Rafał Sonik	Yamaha	44:52:21	+ 05:33:29
5	279	(France) Axel Dutrie	Yamaha	45:04:16	+ 05:45:24
6	262	(France) Bruno Da Costa	Yamaha	45:16:10	+ 05:57:18
7	261	(Argentina) Santiago Hansen	Honda	45:16:11	+ 05:57:19
8	257	(Paraguay) Nelson Sanabria	Yamaha	45:30:38	+ 06:11:46
9	258	(Argentina) Daniel Domaszewski	Honda	44:58:37	+ 06:39:45
10	284	(Poland) Kamil Wiśniewski	Can-Am	47:25:01	+ 08:06:09

=== Cars ===
Pos	No.	Driver	Co-driver	Car	Entrant	Time	Gap
1	300	(France) Stéphane Peterhansel	(France) Jean-Paul Cottret	Peugeot 3008 DKR	Team Peugeot Total	28:49:30	
2	309	(France) Sébastien Loeb	(Monaco) Daniel Elena	Peugeot	Team Peugeot Total	28:54:43	+ 00:05:13
3	307	(France) Cyril Despres	(France) David Castera	Peugeot	Team Peugeot Total	29:22:58	+ 00:33:28
4	305	(Spain) Nani Roma	(Spain) Àlex Haro	Toyota	Overdrive Toyota	30:06:13	+ 01:16:43
5	302	(South Africa) Giniel de Villiers	(Germany) Dirk von Zitzewitz	Toyota	Toyota Gazoo South Africa	30:39:18	+ 01:49:48
6	308	(Argentina) Orlando Terranova	(Germany) Andreas Schulz	Mini	X-Raid Cooper Works Rally Team	30:42:01	+ 01:52:31
7	316	(Poland) Jakub Przygonski	(Belgium) Tom Colsoul	Mini	Orlen Team	33:04:17	+ 04:14:47
8	318	(France) Romain Dumas	(France) Alain Guehennec	Peugeot	RD Limited	33:13:31	+ 04:24:01
9	320	(Zimbabwe) Conrad Rautenbach	(South Africa) Robert Howie	Toyota	Overdrive Toyota	33:29:43	+ 04:40:13
10	322	(Qatar) Mohammed Abu-Issa	(France) Xavier Panseri	Mini	X-Raid Team	33:43:00	+ 04:53:30

=== Trucks ===
Pos	No.	Driver	Co-Driver & mechanic	Truck	Entrant	Time	Gap
1	505	(Russia) Eduard Nikolaev	(Russia) Evgeny Yakovlev (Russia) Vladimir Rybakov	Kamaz	Kamaz-Master	27:58:24	
2	513	(Russia) Dmitry Sotnikov	(Russia) Ruslan Akhmadeev (Russia) Igor Leonov	Kamaz	Kamaz-Master	28:17:22	+ 00:18:58
3	500	(Netherlands) Gerard de Rooy	(Spain) Moisès Torrallardona (Poland) Darek Rodewald	Iveco	Petronas Team de Rooy Iveco	28:39:43	+ 00:41:19
4	502	(Argentina) Federico Villagra	(Argentina) Adrian Yacopini (Argentina) Ricardo Torlaschi	Iveco	YPF Team de Rooy Iveco	28:58:28	+ 01:00:04
5	501	(Russia) Ayrat Mardeev	(Russia) Aydar Belyaev (Russia) Dmitriy Svistunov	Kamaz	Kamaz-Master	30:25:14	+ 02:26:50
6	522	(Belarus) Aleksandr Vasilevski	(Belarus) Dzmitry Vikhrenka (Belarus) Anton Zaparoshchanka	MAZ	MAZ-Sport auto	30:33:21	+ 02:34:57
7	503	(Czech Republic) Aleš Loprais	(Czech Republic) Jiří Stross (Czech Republic) Jan Tománek	Tatra	Tatra Buggyra Racing	31:05:20	+ 03:06:56
8	514	(Japan) Teruhito Sugarawa	(Japan) Hiroyuki Sugiura	Hino	Hino Team Sugarawa	31:17:00	+ 03:18:36
9	504	(Netherlands) Hans Stacey	(Belgium) Jan van der Vaet (Netherlands) Hugo Kupper	MAN	Eurol/Veka MAN Rally Team	31:43:20	+ 03:44:56
10	518	(Czech Republic) Martin Macik	(Czech Republic) František Tomášek (Czech Republic) Michal Mrkva	LIAZ	Big Shock Racing	31:53:04	+ 03:54:40

=== UTVs ===
Pos	No.	Driver	Co-Drivers	UTV	Entrant	Time	Gap
1	351	(Brazil) Leandro Torres	(Brazil) Lourival Roldan	Polaris	Xtremeplus	54:01:50	
2	386	(China) Wang Fujiang	(China) Li Wei	Polaris		58:44:24	+ 04:42:34
3	378	(Russia) Ravil Maganov	(Russia) Kirill Shubin (racer)	Polaris	Xtremeplus	60:07:25	+ 06:05:35
4	342	(China) Mao Ruijin	(France) Sebastien Delaunay	Polaris		77:31:57	+ 23:30:07
5	374	(China) Li Dongsheng	(China) Quanquan Guan	Polaris		78:47:15	+ 24:45:25

== Major retirements ==
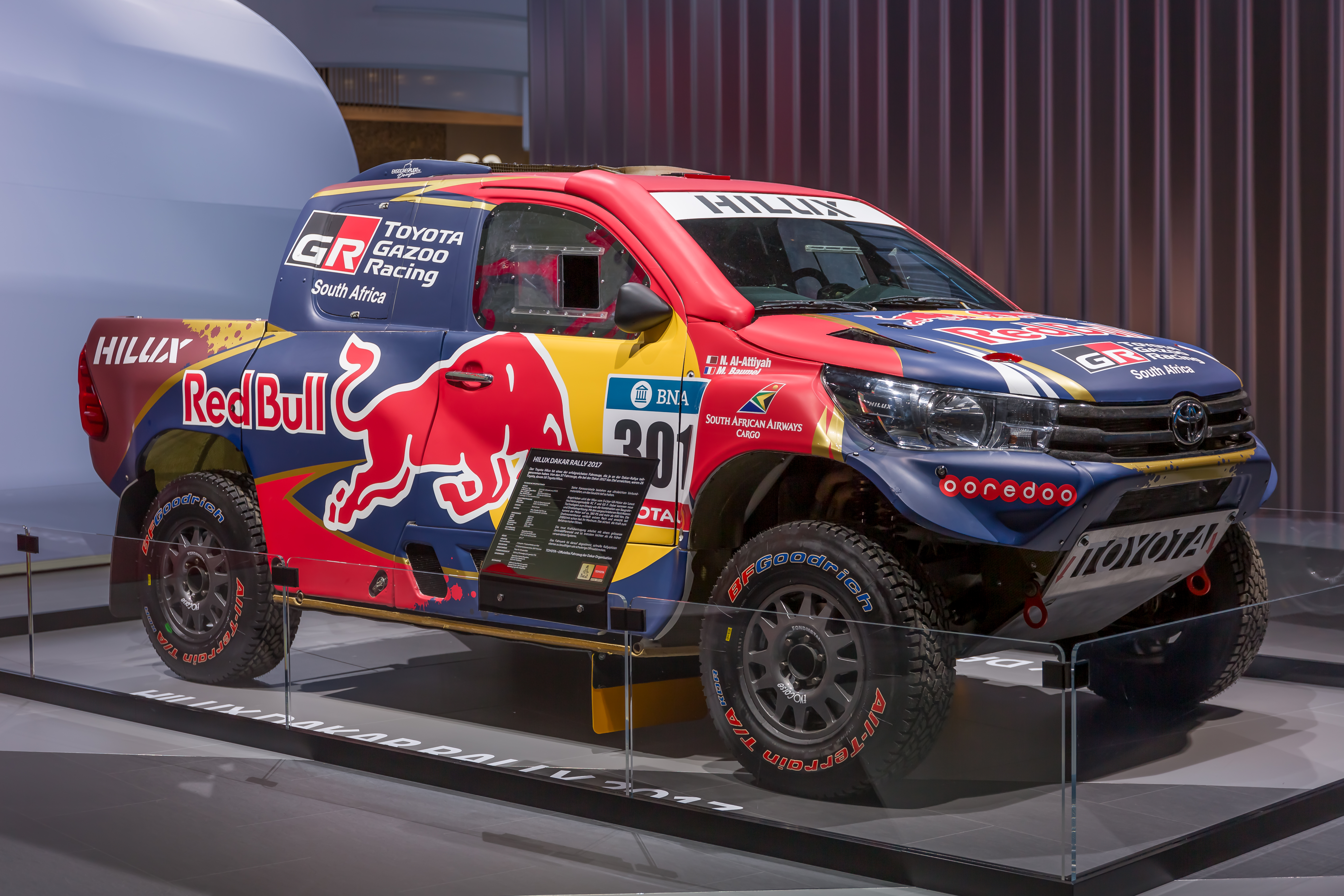
Rebuilt car 301 at IAA 2017

Stage	No.	Driver	Manufacturer	Class	Cause	Obs
3	271	BRA Marcelo Medeiros	Yamaha	Quads	Injured	
3	301	QAT Nasser Al-Attiyah; FRA Matthieu Baumel	Toyota	Cars	Crash	Finished S3 but failed to recover the car for S4
3	311	ESP Xavier Pons; ARG Ruben Garcia	Ford	Cars	Crash	Finished S3 but failed to recover the car for S4
4	281	ARG Gaston Gonzalez	Yamaha	Quads	Injured	Finished S4 with several bone fractures
4	1	AUS Toby Price	KTM	Bikes	Injured	Crashed when was virtual overall leader
4	304	ESP Carlos Sainz; ESP Lucas Cruz	Peugeot	Cars	Crash	
