= 2015 Dakar Rally =

Off-road motorsport event in Argentina, Chile, and Bolivia

Part of the Dakar Rally
← Previous event	Next event →
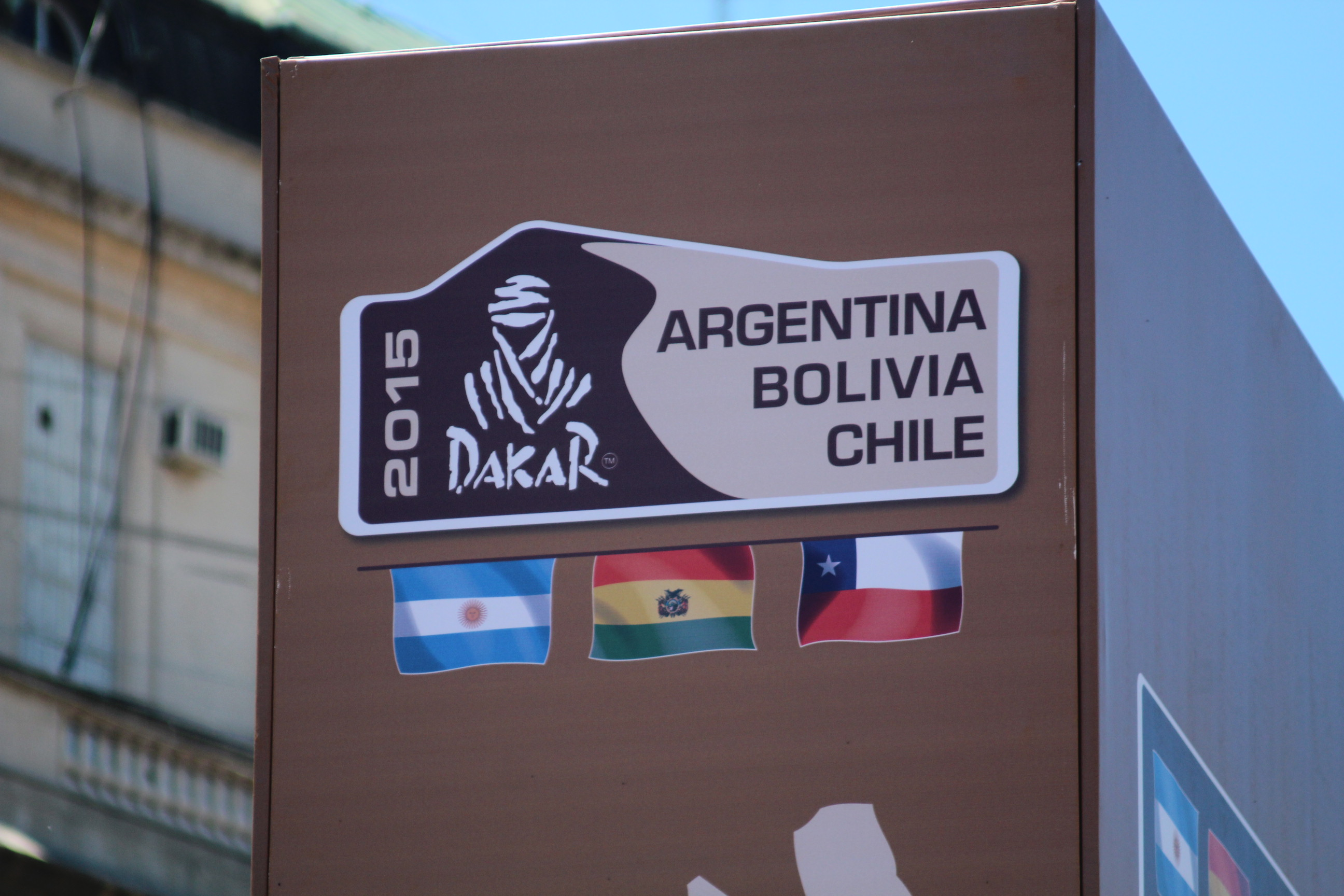
- 2015 Dakar logo and route
- Host country: Argentina; Bolivia; Chile
- Dates run: 4–17 January 2015
- Start: (Argentina) Buenos Aires
- Finish: (Argentina) Buenos Aires
- Stages: 13
- Stage surface: Gravel, dirt, sand
- Overall distance: 9,295 km (5,776 mi)

Results
- Cars winner: (Qatar) Nasser Al-Attiyah (France) Matthieu Baumel (United Kingdom) Mini Qatar Raid Team
- Bikes winner: (Spain) Marc Coma (Austria) Red Bull KTM Factory Racing
- Quads winner: (Poland) Rafał Sonik (Japan) Yamaha Sonik Team
- Trucks winner: (Russia) Ayrat Mardeev (Russia) Aydar Belyaev (Russia) Dmitriy Svistunov (Russia) Kamaz Master
- Crews: 406 at start, 207 at finish

The 2015 Dakar Rally was the 37th running of the event and the seventh successive year that the event was held in South America. The event started in Buenos Aires, Argentina on January 4, then ran through Argentina, Chile and Bolivia, before returning to Buenos Aires on January 17 after 13 stages of competition, for a total distance of 9,000 km (5,600 mi). For the first time, organizers reserved separate rest days for different categories so that at least two classes raced on each day.

Marc Coma won a fifth title in the motorcycle category for KTM, while Rafał Sonik secured a maiden quads crown aboard his Yamaha. Nasser Al-Attiyah took his second title for the X-Raid Mini squad in the car category, while Ayrat Mardeev continued Kamaz's winning streak – a third successive win in the Dakar Rally – in the truck category, with his maiden success.

== Entries ==
Number of participants
Stage	Bikes	Quads	Cars	Trucks	Total
Start of rally	161	45	137	63	406
Rest day	115	24	76	52	267
End of rally	79	18	67	43	207

=== Bikes ===
Leading entries
Manufacturer	Team	No.	Rider
(Austria) KTM	Red Bull KTM Factory Racing	1	(Spain) Marc Coma
(Austria) KTM	Red Bull KTM Factory Racing	4	(Spain) Jordi Viladoms
(Austria) KTM	Red Bull KTM Factory Racing	6	(United Kingdom) Sam Sunderland
(Austria) KTM	Red Bull KTM Factory Racing	11	(Portugal) Ruben Faria
(Austria) KTM	Orlen KTM Rally Factory Team	8	(Poland) Kuba Przygoński
(Austria) KTM	Team Casteu	9	(France) David Casteu
(Japan) Honda	HRC Rally	2	(Spain) Joan Barreda
(Japan) Honda	HRC Rally	5	(Portugal) Hélder Rodrigues
(Japan) Honda	HRC Rally	7	(Portugal) Paulo Gonçalves
(Japan) Honda	HRC Rally	12	(Chile) Jeremias Israel
(Japan) Honda	HRC Rally	29	(Spain) Laia Sanz
(Japan) Honda	Honda South America	24	(Brazil) Jean de Azevedo
(Japan) Yamaha	Yamaha Factory Racing	3	(France) Olivier Pain
(Japan) Yamaha	Yamaha Factory Racing	17	(France) Michael Metge
(Japan) Yamaha	Yamaha Factory Racing	19	(Italy) Alessandro Botturi
(Japan) Yamaha	Pont Grup-Yamaha-JVO Racing	10	(Spain) Juan Pedrero
(Japan) Yamaha	Yamaha Netherlands Verhoeven Team	15	(Netherlands) Frans Verhoeven
(France) Sherco	Sherco TVS Rally Factory	14	(France) Alain Duclos
(France) Sherco	Sherco TVS Rally Factory	25	(France) Fabien Planet

=== Quads ===
Leading entries
Manufacturer	Team	No.	Rider
(Japan) Yamaha	Tamarugal XC Rally Team	250	(Chile) Ignacio Casale
(Japan) Yamaha	Sonik Team	251	(Poland) Rafał Sonik
(Japan) Yamaha	Jianming Racing	252	(Uruguay) Sergio Lafuente
(Japan) Yamaha	Mendoza Espiritu Grande	255	(Argentina) Sebastian Halpern
(Japan) Yamaha	Team Quad Aventures	260	(France) Christophe Declerck
(Japan) Yamaha	Consultores de Empresas	261	(Argentina) Jeremias González
(Japan) Honda	Maxxis Dakar Team Powered by Super B	253	(Qatar) Mohammed Abu-Issa
(Japan) Honda	Tamarugal XC Rally Team	254	(Chile) Victor Manuel Gallegos
(Japan) Honda	Equipo YPF Elaion Moto Rally	258	(Argentina) Lucas Bonetto
(Canada) Can-Am	Tamarugal XC Rally Team	257	(Argentina) Sebastian Palma

=== Cars ===
Leading entries
Manufacturer	Team	No.	Driver	Co-driver
(United Kingdom) Mini	Monster Energy X-Raid Team	300	(Spain) Nani Roma	(France) Michel Perin
(United Kingdom) Mini	Monster Energy X-Raid Team	305	(Argentina) Orlando Terranova	(Argentina) Bernardo Graue
(United Kingdom) Mini	Monster Energy X-Raid Team	307	(Poland) Krzysztof Hołowczyc	(France) Xavier Panseri
(United Kingdom) Mini	Qatar Raid Team	301	(Qatar) Nasser Al-Attiyah	(France) Matthieu Baumel
(France) Peugeot	Team Peugeot Total	302	(France) Stéphane Peterhansel	(France) Jean-Paul Cottret
(France) Peugeot	Team Peugeot Total	304	(Spain) Carlos Sainz	(Spain) Lucas Cruz
(France) Peugeot	Team Peugeot Total	322	(France) Cyril Despres	(France) Gilles Picard
(Japan) Toyota	Imperial Toyota	303	(South Africa) Giniel de Villiers	(Germany) Dirk von Zitzewitz
(Japan) Toyota	Imperial Toyota	327	(South Africa) Leeroy Poulter	(South Africa) Robert Howie
(Japan) Toyota	Overdrive	309	(France) Christian Lavieille	(France) Pascal Maimon
(Japan) Toyota	Overdrive	313	(Argentina) Lucio Alvarez	(Argentina) Roberto Patti
(Japan) Toyota	Overdrive	315	(Netherlands) Bernhard ten Brinke	(Belgium) Tom Colsoul
(Japan) Toyota	Yazeed Racing	325	(Saudi Arabia) Yazeed Al-Rajhi	(Germany) Timo Gottschalk
(Japan) Mitsubishi	Mitsubishi Petrobras	306	(Portugal) Carlos Sousa	(Portugal) Paulo Fiuza
(United States) Hummer	Speed Energy Racing	308	(United States) Robby Gordon	(United States) Johnny Campbell
(France) SMG	SMG	312	(France) Philippe Gache	(France) Jean-Pierre Garcin
(France) SMG	SMG	320	(France) Ronan Chabot	(France) Gilles Pillot
(United States) Ford	YPF Ford Racing	317	(Argentina) Federico Villagra	(Argentina) Andres Memi
(Germany) X-Raid	Buggy All Terrain Team	323	(France) Guerlain Chicherit	(France) Alexandre Winocq

=== Trucks ===
Leading entries
Manufacturer	Team	No.	Driver	Co-drivers
(Russia) Kamaz	Kamaz-Master	500	(Russia) Andrey Karginov	(Russia) Andrey Mokeev (Russia) Igor Leonov
(Russia) Kamaz	Kamaz-Master	502	(Russia) Eduard Nikolaev	(Russia) Evgeny Yakovlev (Russia) Ruslan Akhmadeev
(Russia) Kamaz	Kamaz-Master	507	(Russia) Ayrat Mardeev	(Russia) Aydar Belyaev (Russia) Dmitriy Svistunov
(Russia) Kamaz	Kamaz-Master	520	(Russia) Dmitry Sotnikov	(Russia) Igor Devyatkin (Russia) Andrey Aferin
(Italy) Iveco	Petronas Team De Rooy Iveco	501	(Netherlands) Gérard de Rooy	(Poland) Darek Rodewald (Belgium) Jurgen Damen
(Italy) Iveco	Petronas Team De Rooy Iveco	504	(Netherlands) Hans Stacey	(Belgium) Serge Bruynkens (Netherlands) Bernard der Kinderen
(Italy) Iveco	Petronas Team De Rooy Iveco	509	(Spain) Pep Vila	(Spain) Xavi Colome (Netherlands) Michel Huisman
(Germany) MAN	Eurol/Veka MAN Rally Team	503	(Czech Republic) Aleš Loprais	(Spain) Ferran Alcayna (Belgium) Jan van der Vaet
(Germany) MAN	Eurol/Veka MAN Rally Team	508	(Netherlands) Marcel van Vliet	(Netherlands) Marcel Pronk (Germany) Artur Klein
(Czech Republic) Tatra	Tatra Buggyra Racing	506	(Czech Republic) Martin Kolomý	(Czech Republic) David Kilián (Czech Republic) René Kilián
(Czech Republic) Tatra	Astana	515	(Kazakhstan) Artur Ardavichus	(Kazakhstan) Alexey Nikizhev (Czech Republic) Daniel Kozlowsky
(Netherlands) Ginaf	Ginaf Rally Service	511	(Netherlands) Wulfert van Ginkel	(Netherlands) Hugo Kupper (Netherlands) Bert van Donkelaar

== Stages ==
Stage	Date	Depart	Arrive	Bikes			Quads	Cars			Trucks		
Stage	Date	Depart	Arrive	Rd	SS	Winner	Winner	Rd	SS	Winner	Rd	SS	Winner
1	4 January	(Argentina) Buenos Aires	(Argentina) Villa Carlos Paz	663	175	(United Kingdom) S. Sunderland	(Chile) I. Casale	663	170	(Argentina) O. Terranova (Note: Nasser Al-Attiyah set the fastest time for the stage before being awarded a 2-minute penalty.)	663	175	(Netherlands) H. Stacey
2	5 January	(Argentina) Villa Carlos Paz	(Argentina) San Juan	107	518	(Spain) J. Barreda	(Chile) I. Casale (Note: Rafał Sonik set the fastest time for the stage before being awarded a 15-minute penalty.)	107	518	(Qatar) N. Al-Attiyah	315	331	(Russia) E. Nikolaev
3	6 January	(Argentina) San Juan	(Argentina) Chilecito	437	220	(Austria) M. Walkner	(Argentina) L. Bonetto	258	284	(Argentina) O. Terranova	258	284	(Russia) A. Mardeev
4	7 January	(Argentina) Chilecito	(Chile) Copiapó	594	315	(Spain) J. Barreda	(Poland) R. Sonik	594	315	(Qatar) N. Al-Attiyah	594	174	(Russia) E. Nikolaev
5	8 January	(Chile) Copiapó	(Chile) Antofagasta	239	458	(Spain) M. Coma	(Poland) R. Sonik	239	458	(Russia) V. Vasilyev	239	458	(Russia) E. Nikolaev
6	9 January	(Chile) Antofagasta	(Chile) Iquique	369	319	(Portugal) H. Rodrigues	(Chile) I. Casale	392	255	(Qatar) N. Al-Attiyah	370	255	(Russia) E. Nikolaev
7	10 January (Note: Held for cars and trucks.); 11 January (Note: Held for bikes and quads.)	(Chile) Iquique	(Bolivia) Uyuni (Chile) Atacama (Note: For trucks only.)	396	321	(Portugal) P. Gonçalves	(Paraguay) N. Sanabria	396	321	(Argentina) O. Terranova	101	335	(Czech Republic) A. Loprais
8	11 January; 12 January	(Bolivia) Uyuni (Chile) Atacama	(Chile) Iquique	24	781	(Chile) P. Quintanilla	(Argentina) J. González	24	781	(Saudi Arabia) Y. Al-Rajhi	0	271	(Russia) E. Nikolaev
9	13 January	(Chile) Iquique	(Chile) Calama	88	451	(Portugal) H. Rodrigues	(Chile) V. Gallegos	88	451	(Spain) N. Roma	88	451	(Russia) A. Mardeev
10	14 January	(Chile) Calama	(Argentina) Salta	520	371	(Spain) J. Barreda	(Paraguay) N. Sanabria	501	359	(Qatar) N. Al-Attiyah	501	359	(Russia) E. Nikolaev
11	15 January	(Argentina) Salta	(Argentina) Termas de Río Hondo	161	351	(Slovakia) I. Jakeš (Note: Joan Barreda set the fastest time for the stage before being awarded a 45-minute penalty.)	(France) C. Declerck	326	194	(Qatar) N. Al-Attiyah	326	194	(Netherlands) H. Stacey
12	16 January	(Argentina) Termas de Río Hondo	(Argentina) Rosario	726	298	(Australia) T. Price	(France) C. Declerck	726	298	(Argentina) O. Terranova	726	298	(Netherlands) H. Stacey
13	17 January	(Argentina) Rosario	(Argentina) Buenos Aires	219	174	(Slovakia) I. Jakeš	(South Africa) W. Saaijman	219	174	(United States) R. Gordon	219	174	(Netherlands) H. Stacey

== Summary ==
=== Bikes ===
The race was expected to be a fight between KTM, led by defending champion Marc Coma, and Honda's fleet, spearheaded by Joan Barreda, which had not triumphed since returning to Dakar as a works operation. KTM's Sam Sunderland won the opening stage, but dropped time getting lost on the second stage before retiring after injuring his shoulder and collarbone in a crash on the fourth stage. That handed the lead to Barreda, who extended his advantage to almost 13 minutes over Coma with wins in the second and fourth stages. Coma fought back with his first (and only) stage victory the following day, Barreda having his lead reduced to six-and-a-half minutes on the seventh stage after a fall which damaged his handlebar.

Worse was to come for Barreda on the eighth stage however, as a mechanical failure while traversing the damp Uyuni salt flats meant he had to be towed by teammate Jeremias Israel, losing over three hours as a result and any chance of victory. Barreda's misfortune left Coma with a lead of just under ten minutes from Paulo Gonçalves, around whom the rest of the Honda team rallied in order to challenge Coma in the subsequent stages. Gonçalves nonetheless saw his own victory hopes ruined by a penalty for an engine change on Stage 11, Barreda also losing his fourth stage win of the rally for similar reasons. Ultimately, Coma would finish the rally with just under 17 minutes in hand from Gonçalves, who took his first ever Dakar podium as Coma clinched a fifth title in the category.

Rookie Toby Price (KTM) finished third overall after winning the penultimate stage, the best performance by an Australian on a bike in the Dakar since Andy Haydon finished in the same position in 1998. Fellow newcomer Matthias Walkner (KTM) was equally impressive, winning the third stage but ultimately had to retire due to illness. The top five was rounded out by KTM privateers Pablo Quintanilla, who won the eighth stage, and Štefan Svitko, with Coma's water carrier Ruben Faria finishing sixth despite suffering a broken collarbone as recently as November. Laia Sanz finished ninth to become the most successful ever female rider in Dakar history, ahead of top Yamaha rider Olivier Pain, who struggled with an under-developed bike.

Hélder Rodrigues (Honda), suffering from influenza early in the rally, won stages 6 and 9 but would drop down the standings when he turned his attentions to helping Gonçalves' bid for victory, finishing 12th. Barreda meanwhile recovered to finish 17th, once again taking more stage victories – with 3 – than any other rider, as he did in 2014. Notable non-finishers included 2014 runner-up Jordi Viladoms (KTM) and factory Sherco rider Juan Pedrero.

=== Quads ===
After six years of South American domination, the 2015 edition crowned Polish rider Rafał Sonik, who along with defending champion Ignacio Casale began the event as favourite for victory. The duel between the Yamaha pair was finely balanced until the tenth stage, which saw Casale, who had been running second just four minutes down on Sonik, withdrawing with mechanical problems, while third-place rider Sergio Lafuente (Yamaha) also suffered a violent accident. This gave Sonik a lead of nearly three hours over nearest rival Jeremias González (Yamaha), which he duly maintained to the finish. Rounding out the podium was top Honda rider Walter Nosiglia, almost a further hour behind González.

=== Cars ===
The event began disastrously for defending champion Nani Roma, who suffered a breakdown a short way into the opening stage and had to be towed to the bivouac by an assistance vehicle – immediately ruling him out of the fight for the victory and relegating him to a support player in the X-Raid Mini team. Roma's teammate Orlando Terranova inherited the first stage win after a speeding penalty for Nasser Al-Attiyah, but Terranova would suffer a roll in the second stage, effectively ending his challenge. Three more wins in the next five stages allowed Al-Attiyah to build up an 11-minute advantage over Giniel de Villiers in his Toyota Hilux, who would be the closest driver to attempt to keep up with Al-Attiyah.

After closing to within eight minutes of Al-Attiyah, de Villiers would lose around 16 minutes to his rival on stage 9 due to a navigational error, taking the pressure off the leader. Al-Attiyah was not to be challenged again, winning stages 10 and 11, to take the overall title by a margin of 35 minutes from de Villiers. It was Al-Attiyah's second overall win at the Dakar.

Debutant Yazeed Al-Rajhi (Toyota) was the race's surprise, winning the eighth stage and holding third in the overall standings for much of the rally prior to retiring three stages later due to mechanical issues. That promoted Krzysztof Hołowczyc to the final place on the podium, over 90 minutes adrift of teammate Al-Attiyah, with privateers Erik van Loon and Vladimir Vasilyev – winner of stage five – making it four Minis in the top five. After winning the ninth stage, Roma would withdraw after a heavy accident the next day, while Terranova won a further trio of stages after his opening day success to end the event 18th overall.

If Mini dominated the race – winning 11 of the 13 stages – Peugeot, returning after 25 years, were left disillusioned as their two-wheel drive, diesel-powered 2008 DKR contender suffered from many reliability issues. 11-time event winner Stéphane Peterhansel finished 11th overall, never challenging for stage wins, while Cyril Despres could not better 34th position, struggling to adapt to the car category after much success on two wheels. Carlos Sainz was the fastest of the Peugeot team and the only one to rival the pace of the Minis and Toyotas, but he lost two hours with mechanical problems in the fourth stage and retired the next day due to a violent crash.

The ever-popular Robby Gordon, back with his new Gordini buggy – a shorter version of the Hummer H3 – would suffer from overheating brakes on the second stage, losing four hours, and experienced further problems on the fourth stage. Victory in the shortened final stage put Gordon 19th overall. Ronan Chabot was the highest-ranked buggy driver, taking the SMG prototype to 10th in the standings. Guerlain Chicherit, with a buggy from the X-Raid team – similar to that used by Al-Attiyah and Sainz in 2013 – was only 45th, plagued from the start with several mechanical and electrical problems, including a fire that nearly destroyed the car.

=== Trucks ===
The race was totally dominated by the Kamaz team, which won 8 of the 13 stages and swept the podium with its drivers Ayrat Mardeev – son of the recently deceased Ilgizar Mardeev, runner-up in 2007 – Eduard Nikolaev and reigning champion Andrey Karginov. Winning four of the first six stages, Nikolaev had built up a lead of 13 minutes over Mardeev, but dropped back with mechanical problems on stage 7, handing Mardeev an advantage of 22 minutes over Karginov. Nikolaev fought his way back up to second with two more stage wins. However, he fell just under 14 minutes short of overhauling Mardeev, with Karginov 51 minutes down by the finish.

Aleš Loprais switched from Tatra to MAN machinery and was the only competitor able to keep pace with the Kamaz fleet, winning the seventh stage but finished the rally fourth overall and more than an hour from the podium places. Iveco, despite four stage wins courtesy of Hans Stacey, suffered from reliability issues, with the result that Stacey could do no better than sixth – just behind Kamaz's fourth driver Dmitry Sotnikov – and Gerard de Rooy ninth. The Belarusian Siarhei Viazovich almost caused an upset when he came close to winning stage 2 for MAZ, but finished all the way down in 34th after suffering severe gearbox issues.

== Stage results ==
=== Bikes ===
	Stage result					General classification				
Stage	Pos	Competitor	Make	Time	Gap	Pos	Competitor	Make	Time	Gap
1	1	(United Kingdom) Sam Sunderland	KTM	1:18:57		1	(United Kingdom) Sam Sunderland	KTM	1:18:57	
1	2	(Portugal) Paulo Gonçalves	Honda	1:19:02	0:05	2	(Portugal) Paulo Gonçalves	Honda	1:19:02	0:05
1	3	(Spain) Marc Coma	KTM	1:20:09	1:12	3	(Spain) Marc Coma	KTM	1:20:09	1:12
2	1	(Spain) Joan Barreda	Honda	5:46:06		1	(Spain) Joan Barreda	Honda	7:06:44	
2	2	(Portugal) Paulo Gonçalves	Honda	5:52:19	6:13	2	(Portugal) Paulo Gonçalves	Honda	7:11:21	4:37
2	3	(Portugal) Ruben Faria	KTM	5:55:22	9:16	3	(Portugal) Ruben Faria	KTM	7:17:21	10:37
3	1	(Austria) Matthias Walkner	KTM	2:34:28		1	(Spain) Joan Barreda	Honda	9:43:05	
3	2	(Spain) Marc Coma	KTM	2:35:08	0:40	2	(Portugal) Paulo Gonçalves	Honda	9:48:38	5:33
3	3	(Spain) Joan Barreda	Honda	2:36:21	1:53	3	(Austria) Matthias Walkner	KTM	9:53:38	10:33
4	1	(Spain) Joan Barreda	Honda	3:27:28		1	(Spain) Joan Barreda	Honda	13:10:33	
4	2	(Spain) Marc Coma	KTM	3:29:27	1:59	2	(Spain) Marc Coma	KTM	13:23:22	12:49
4	3	(Chile) Pablo Quintanilla	KTM	3:30:17	2:49	3	(Portugal) Paulo Gonçalves	Honda	13:31:02	20:29
5	1	(Spain) Marc Coma	KTM	4:38:16		1	(Spain) Joan Barreda	Honda	17:51:05	
5	2	(Spain) Joan Barreda	Honda	4:40:32	2:16	2	(Spain) Marc Coma	KTM	18:01:38	10:33
5	3	(Chile) Pablo Quintanilla	KTM	4:40:56	2:40	3	(Portugal) Paulo Gonçalves	Honda	18:13:55	22:50
6	1	(Portugal) Hélder Rodrigues	Honda	3:40:10		1	(Spain) Joan Barreda	Honda	21:38:35	
6	2	(Australia) Toby Price	KTM	3:41:20	1:10	2	(Spain) Marc Coma	KTM	21:51:02	12:27
6	3	(Portugal) Paulo Gonçalves	Honda	3:41:52	1:42	3	(Portugal) Paulo Gonçalves	Honda	21:55:47	17:12
7	1	(Portugal) Paulo Gonçalves	Honda	3:56:00		1	(Spain) Joan Barreda	Honda	25:40:48	
7	2	(Spain) Marc Coma	KTM	3:56:14	0:14	2	(Spain) Marc Coma	KTM	25:47:16	6:28
7	3	(Austria) Matthias Walkner	KTM	3:56:30	0:30	3	(Portugal) Paulo Gonçalves	Honda	25:51:47	10:59
8	1	(Chile) Pablo Quintanilla	KTM	2:56:19		1	(Spain) Marc Coma	KTM	28:51:12	
8	2	(Spain) Juan Pedrero	Yamaha	2:56:30	0:11	2	(Portugal) Paulo Gonçalves	Honda	29:00:23	9:11
8	3	(Slovakia) Štefan Svitko	KTM	2:56:31	0:12	3	(Chile) Pablo Quintanilla	KTM	29:02:23	11:11
9	1	(Portugal) Hélder Rodrigues	Honda	5:06:14		1	(Spain) Marc Coma	KTM	34:05:00	
9	2	(Portugal) Paulo Gonçalves	Honda	5:10:05	3:51	2	(Portugal) Paulo Gonçalves	Honda	34:10:28	5:28
9	3	(Spain) Marc Coma	KTM	5:13:48	7:34	3	(Chile) Pablo Quintanilla	KTM	34:31:52	26:52
10	1	(Spain) Joan Barreda	Honda	4:07:11		1	(Spain) Marc Coma	KTM	38:13:50	
10	2	(Spain) Marc Coma	KTM	4:08:50	1:39	2	(Portugal) Paulo Gonçalves	Honda	38:21:25	7:35
10	3	(Portugal) Ruben Faria	KTM	4:09:08	1:57	3	(Chile) Pablo Quintanilla	KTM	38:45:32	31:42
11	1	(Slovakia) Ivan Jakeš	KTM	3:28:08		1	(Spain) Marc Coma	KTM	41:43:03	
11	2	(Portugal) Ruben Faria	KTM	3:28:16	0:08	2	(Portugal) Paulo Gonçalves	Honda	42:04:15	21:12
11	3	(Australia) Toby Price	KTM	3:28:50	0:42	3	(Australia) Toby Price	KTM	42:14:46	31:43
12	1	(Australia) Toby Price	KTM	3:19:04		1	(Spain) Marc Coma	KTM	45:08:32	
12	2	(Spain) Joan Barreda	Honda	3:20:59	1:55	2	(Portugal) Paulo Gonçalves	Honda	45:26:21	17:49
12	3	(Portugal) Paulo Gonçalves	Honda	3:22:06	3:02	3	(Australia) Toby Price	KTM	45:33:50	25:18
13	1	(Slovakia) Ivan Jakeš	KTM	52:06		1	(Spain) Marc Coma	KTM	46:03:49	
13	2	(Slovakia) Štefan Svitko	KTM	52:51	0:45	2	(Portugal) Paulo Gonçalves	Honda	46:20:42	16:53
13	3	(Australia) Toby Price	KTM	53:13	1:07	3	(Australia) Toby Price	KTM	46:27:03	23:14

=== Quads ===
	Stage result					General classification				
Stage	Pos	Competitor	Make	Time	Gap	Pos	Competitor	Make	Time	Gap
1	1	(Chile) Ignacio Casale	Yamaha	1:37:08		1	(Chile) Ignacio Casale	Yamaha	1:37:08	
1	2	(Poland) Rafał Sonik	Yamaha	1:38:15	1:07	2	(Poland) Rafał Sonik	Yamaha	1:38:15	1:07
1	3	(Uruguay) Sergio Lafuente	Yamaha	1:38:31	1:23	3	(Uruguay) Sergio Lafuente	Yamaha	1:38:31	1:23
2	1	(Chile) Ignacio Casale	Yamaha	6:52:57		1	(Chile) Ignacio Casale	Yamaha	8:30:05	
2	2	(Uruguay) Sergio Lafuente	Yamaha	6:53:38	0:41	2	(Uruguay) Sergio Lafuente	Yamaha	8:32:09	2:04
2	3	(Argentina) Sebastian Halpern	Yamaha	6:58:30	5:33	3	(Argentina) Sebastian Halpern	Yamaha	8:41:18	11:13
3	1	(Argentina) Lucas Bonetto	Honda	3:08:27		1	(Uruguay) Sergio Lafuente	Yamaha	11:43:15	
3	2	(Argentina) Sebastian Halpern	Yamaha	3:09:25	0:58	2	(Argentina) Sebastian Halpern	Yamaha	11:50:43	7:28
3	3	(Poland) Rafał Sonik	Yamaha	3:10:41	2:14	3	(Poland) Rafał Sonik	Yamaha	11:53:20	10:05
4	1	(Poland) Rafał Sonik	Yamaha	4:11:35		1	(Poland) Rafał Sonik	Yamaha	16:04:55	
4	2	(Chile) Ignacio Casale	Yamaha	4:15:01	3:26	2	(Uruguay) Sergio Lafuente	Yamaha	16:08:44	3:49
4	3	(Qatar) Mohammed Abu-Issa	Honda	4:24:49	13:14	3	(Chile) Ignacio Casale	Yamaha	16:18:27	13:32
5	1	(Poland) Rafał Sonik	Yamaha	5:47:46		1	(Poland) Rafał Sonik	Yamaha	21:52:41	
5	2	(Chile) Ignacio Casale	Yamaha	5:58:37	10:51	2	(Chile) Ignacio Casale	Yamaha	22:17:04	24:23
5	3	(Argentina) Jeremias González	Yamaha	6:09:27	21:41	3	(Uruguay) Sergio Lafuente	Yamaha	22:19:01	26:20
6	1	(Chile) Ignacio Casale	Yamaha	4:21:52		1	(Poland) Rafał Sonik	Yamaha	26:22:48	
6	2	(Poland) Rafał Sonik	Yamaha	4:30:07	8:15	2	(Chile) Ignacio Casale	Yamaha	26:38:56	16:08
6	3	(Uruguay) Sergio Lafuente	Yamaha	4:45:00	23:08	3	(Uruguay) Sergio Lafuente	Yamaha	27:04:01	41:13
7	1	(Paraguay) Nelson Sanabria	Yamaha	5:22:12		1	(Poland) Rafał Sonik	Yamaha	31:50:46	
7	2	(Poland) Rafał Sonik	Yamaha	5:27:58	5:46	2	(Chile) Ignacio Casale	Yamaha	32:12:45	21:59
7	3	(Chile) Ignacio Casale	Yamaha	5:33:49	11:37	3	(Uruguay) Sergio Lafuente	Yamaha	32:58:46	1:08:00
8	1	(Argentina) Jeremias González	Yamaha	3:43:35		1	(Chile) Ignacio Casale	Yamaha	36:04:14	
8	2	(Chile) Ignacio Casale	Yamaha	3:51:29	7:54	2	(Poland) Rafał Sonik	Yamaha	36:11:03	6:49
8	3	(Uruguay) Sergio Lafuente	Yamaha	3:54:39	11:04	3	(Uruguay) Sergio Lafuente	Yamaha	36:53:25	49:11
9	1	(Chile) Víctor Gallegos	Honda	6:31:46		1	(Poland) Rafał Sonik	Yamaha	42:58:24	
9	2	(Poland) Rafał Sonik	Yamaha	6:47:21	15:35	2	(Chile) Ignacio Casale	Yamaha	43:02:24	4:00
9	3	(Uruguay) Sergio Lafuente	Yamaha	6:57:15	25:29	3	(Uruguay) Sergio Lafuente	Yamaha	43:50:40	52:16
10	1	(Paraguay) Nelson Sanabria	Yamaha	4:58:29		1	(Poland) Rafał Sonik	Yamaha	48:02:07	
10	2	(Argentina) Jeremias González	Yamaha	5:01:39	3:10	2	(Argentina) Jeremias González	Yamaha	50:53:46	2:51:39
10	3	(Bolivia) Walter Nosiglia	Honda	5:02:29	4:00	3	(Bolivia) Walter Nosiglia	Honda	51:46:32	3:44:25
11	1	(France) Christophe Declerck	Yamaha	3:56:39		1	(Poland) Rafał Sonik	Yamaha	52:07:58	
11	2	(Paraguay) Nelson Sanabria	Yamaha	4:03:14	6:35	2	(Argentina) Jeremias González	Yamaha	54:57:59	2:50:01
11	3	(Bolivia) Walter Nosiglia	Honda	4:03:29	6:50	3	(Bolivia) Walter Nosiglia	Honda	55:50:01	3:42:03
12	1	(France) Christophe Declerck	Yamaha	3:47:15		1	(Poland) Rafał Sonik	Yamaha	56:05:18	
12	2	(Paraguay) Nelson Sanabria	Yamaha	3:54:24	7:09	2	(Argentina) Jeremias González	Yamaha	58:57:35	2:52:17
12	3	(Bolivia) Walter Nosiglia	Honda	3:56:46	9:31	3	(Bolivia) Walter Nosiglia	Honda	59:46:47	3:41:29
13	1	(South Africa) Willem Saaijman	Yamaha	1:05:05		1	(Poland) Rafał Sonik	Yamaha	57:18:39	
13	2	(France) Christophe Declerck	Yamaha	1:05:11	0:06	2	(Argentina) Jeremias González	Yamaha	60:13:29	2:54:50
13	3	(Argentina) Daniel Domaszewski	Honda	1:05:14	0:09	3	(Bolivia) Walter Nosiglia	Honda	61:01:35	3:42:56

=== Cars ===
	Stage result					General classification				
Stage	Pos	Competitor	Make	Time	Gap	Pos	Competitor	Make	Time	Gap
1	1	(Argentina) Orlando Terranova (Argentina) Bernardo Graue	Mini	1:13:12		1	(Argentina) Orlando Terranova (Argentina) Bernardo Graue	Mini	1:13:12	
1	2	(United States) Robby Gordon (United States) Johnny Campbell	Hummer	1:13:54	0:42	2	(United States) Robby Gordon (United States) Johnny Campbell	Hummer	1:13:54	0:42
1	3	(South Africa) Giniel de Villiers (Germany) Dirk von Zitzewitz	Toyota	1:14:02	0:50	3	(South Africa) Giniel de Villiers (Germany) Dirk von Zitzewitz	Toyota	1:14:02	0:50
2	1	(Qatar) Nasser Al-Attiyah (France) Matthieu Baumel	Mini	5:04:50		1	(Qatar) Nasser Al-Attiyah (France) Matthieu Baumel	Mini	6:19:40	
2	2	(South Africa) Giniel de Villiers (Germany) Dirk von Zitzewitz	Toyota	5:13:20	8:30	2	(South Africa) Giniel de Villiers (Germany) Dirk von Zitzewitz	Toyota	6:27:22	7:42
2	3	(Netherlands) Bernhard ten Brinke (Belgium) Tom Colsoul	Toyota	5:14:54	10:04	3	(Netherlands) Bernhard ten Brinke (Belgium) Tom Colsoul	Toyota	6:29:22	9:42
3	1	(Argentina) Orlando Terranova (Argentina) Bernardo Graue	Mini	2:57:28		1	(Qatar) Nasser Al-Attiyah (France) Matthieu Baumel	Mini	9:21:26	
3	2	(South Africa) Giniel de Villiers (Germany) Dirk von Zitzewitz	Toyota	2:59:22	1:54	2	(South Africa) Giniel de Villiers (Germany) Dirk von Zitzewitz	Toyota	9:26:44	5:18
3	3	(Saudi Arabia) Yazeed Al-Rajhi (Germany) Timo Gottschalk	Toyota	3:00:20	2:52	3	(Argentina) Orlando Terranova (Argentina) Bernardo Graue	Mini	9:39:31	18:05
4	1	(Qatar) Nasser Al-Attiyah (France) Matthieu Baumel	Mini	3:09:18		1	(Qatar) Nasser Al-Attiyah (France) Matthieu Baumel	Mini	12:30:44	
4	2	(Spain) Nani Roma (France) Michel Périn	Mini	3:11:58	2:40	2	(South Africa) Giniel de Villiers (Germany) Dirk von Zitzewitz	Toyota	12:38:59	8:15
4	3	(South Africa) Giniel de Villiers (Germany) Dirk von Zitzewitz	Toyota	3:12:15	2:57	3	(Saudi Arabia) Yazeed Al-Rajhi (Germany) Timo Gottschalk	Toyota	12:54:17	23:33
5	1	(Russia) Vladimir Vasilyev (Russia) Konstantin Zhiltsov	Mini	4:19:18		1	(Qatar) Nasser Al-Attiyah (France) Matthieu Baumel	Mini	16:53:26	
5	2	(Saudi Arabia) Yazeed Al-Rajhi (Germany) Timo Gottschalk	Toyota	4:19:38	0:20	2	(South Africa) Giniel de Villiers (Germany) Dirk von Zitzewitz	Toyota	17:04:01	10:35
5	3	(United States) Robby Gordon (United States) Johnny Campbell	Hummer	4:20:43	1:25	3	(Saudi Arabia) Yazeed Al-Rajhi (Germany) Timo Gottschalk	Toyota	17:13:55	20:29
6	1	(Qatar) Nasser Al-Attiyah (France) Matthieu Baumel	Mini	2:37:18		1	(Qatar) Nasser Al-Attiyah (France) Matthieu Baumel	Mini	19:30:44	
6	2	(South Africa) Giniel de Villiers (Germany) Dirk von Zitzewitz	Toyota	2:37:55	0:37	2	(South Africa) Giniel de Villiers (Germany) Dirk von Zitzewitz	Toyota	19:41:56	11:12
6	3	(Spain) Nani Roma (France) Michel Périn	Mini	2:38:42	1:24	3	(Saudi Arabia) Yazeed Al-Rajhi (Germany) Timo Gottschalk	Toyota	19:59:28	28:44
7	1	(Argentina) Orlando Terranova (Argentina) Bernardo Graue	Mini	3:31:18		1	(Qatar) Nasser Al-Attiyah (France) Matthieu Baumel	Mini	23:11:50	
7	2	(Saudi Arabia) Yazeed Al-Rajhi (Germany) Timo Gottschalk	Toyota	3:33:38	2:20	2	(South Africa) Giniel de Villiers (Germany) Dirk von Zitzewitz	Toyota	23:20:04	8:14
7	3	(Netherlands) Bernhard ten Brinke (Belgium) Tom Colsoul	Toyota	3:33:46	2:28	3	(Saudi Arabia) Yazeed Al-Rajhi (Germany) Timo Gottschalk	Toyota	23:33:06	21:16
8	1	(Saudi Arabia) Yazeed Al-Rajhi (Germany) Timo Gottschalk	Toyota	3:26:49		1	(Qatar) Nasser Al-Attiyah (France) Matthieu Baumel	Mini	26:41:15	
8	2	(Argentina) Orlando Terranova (Argentina) Bernardo Graue	Mini	3:28:01	1:12	2	(South Africa) Giniel de Villiers (Germany) Dirk von Zitzewitz	Toyota	26:49:42	8:27
8	3	(Qatar) Nasser Al-Attiyah (France) Matthieu Baumel	Mini	3:29:25	2:36	3	(Saudi Arabia) Yazeed Al-Rajhi (Germany) Timo Gottschalk	Toyota	26:59:55	18:40
9	1	(Spain) Nani Roma (France) Michel Périn	Mini	4:41:56		1	(Qatar) Nasser Al-Attiyah (France) Matthieu Baumel	Mini	31:29:38	
9	2	(Qatar) Nasser Al-Attiyah (France) Matthieu Baumel	Mini	4:48:23	6:27	2	(South Africa) Giniel de Villiers (Germany) Dirk von Zitzewitz	Toyota	31:53:36	23:58
9	3	(Russia) Vladimir Vasilyev (Russia) Konstantin Zhiltsov	Mini	4:57:48	15:52	3	(Saudi Arabia) Yazeed Al-Rajhi (Germany) Timo Gottschalk	Toyota	32:09:07	39:29
10	1	(Qatar) Nasser Al-Attiyah (France) Matthieu Baumel	Mini	3:49:59		1	(Qatar) Nasser Al-Attiyah (France) Matthieu Baumel	Mini	35:19:37	
10	2	(Argentina) Orlando Terranova (Argentina) Bernardo Graue	Mini	3:51:34	1:35	2	(South Africa) Giniel de Villiers (Germany) Dirk von Zitzewitz	Toyota	35:47:59	28:22
10	3	(Saudi Arabia) Yazeed Al-Rajhi (Germany) Timo Gottschalk	Toyota	3:53:38	3:39	3	(Saudi Arabia) Yazeed Al-Rajhi (Germany) Timo Gottschalk	Toyota	36:02:45	43:08
11	1	(Qatar) Nasser Al-Attiyah (France) Matthieu Baumel	Mini	1:53:10		1	(Qatar) Nasser Al-Attiyah (France) Matthieu Baumel	Mini	37:12:47	
11	2	(Argentina) Orlando Terranova (Argentina) Bernardo Graue	Mini	1:53:37	0:27	2	(South Africa) Giniel de Villiers (Germany) Dirk von Zitzewitz	Toyota	37:41:48	29:01
11	3	(South Africa) Giniel de Villiers (Germany) Dirk von Zitzewitz	Toyota	1:53:49	0:39	3	(Poland) Krzysztof Hołowczyc (France) Xavier Panseri	Mini	38:41:36	1:28:49
12	1	(Argentina) Orlando Terranova (Argentina) Bernardo Graue	Mini	3:04:06		1	(Qatar) Nasser Al-Attiyah (France) Matthieu Baumel	Mini	40:18:30	
12	2	(Russia) Vladimir Vasilyev (Russia) Konstantin Zhiltsov	Mini	3:04:36	0:30	2	(South Africa) Giniel de Villiers (Germany) Dirk von Zitzewitz	Toyota	40:54:09	35:39
12	3	(Argentina) Emiliano Spataro (Argentina) Benjamin Lozada	Renault	3:05:35	1:29	3	(Poland) Krzysztof Hołowczyc (France) Xavier Panseri	Mini	41:50:21	1:31:51
13	1	(United States) Robby Gordon (United States) Johnny Campbell	Hummer	13:16		1	(Qatar) Nasser Al-Attiyah (France) Matthieu Baumel	Mini	40:32:25	
13	2	(South Africa) Leeroy Poulter (South Africa) Robert Howie	Toyota	13:41	0:25	2	(South Africa) Giniel de Villiers (Germany) Dirk von Zitzewitz	Toyota	41:07:59	35:34
13	3	(Argentina) Emiliano Spataro (Argentina) Benjamin Lozada	Renault	13:45	0:29	3	(Poland) Krzysztof Hołowczyc (France) Xavier Panseri	Mini	42:04:26	1:32:01

=== Trucks ===
	Stage result					General classification				
Stage	Pos	Competitor	Make	Time	Gap	Pos	Competitor	Make	Time	Gap
1	1	(Netherlands) Hans Stacey (Belgium) Serge Bruynkens (Netherlands) Bernard der Kinderen	Iveco	1:30:43		1	(Netherlands) Hans Stacey (Belgium) Serge Bruynkens (Netherlands) Bernard der Kinderen	Iveco	1:30:43	
1	2	(Netherlands) Marcel van Vliet (Netherlands) Marcel Pronk (Germany) Artur Klein	MAN	1:31:18	0:35	2	(Netherlands) Marcel van Vliet (Netherlands) Marcel Pronk (Germany) Artur Klein	MAN	1:31:18	0:35
1	3	(Czech Republic) Aleš Loprais (Spain) Ferran Alcayna (Belgium) Jan van der Vaet	MAN	1:31:30	0:47	3	(Czech Republic) Aleš Loprais (Spain) Ferran Alcayna (Belgium) Jan van der Vaet	MAN	1:31:30	0:47
2	1	(Russia) Eduard Nikolaev (Russia) Evgeny Yakovlev (Russia) Ruslan Akhmadeev	Kamaz	3:34:01		1	(Netherlands) Hans Stacey (Belgium) Serge Bruynkens (Netherlands) Bernard der Kinderen	Iveco	5:06:11	
2	2	(Belarus) Siarhei Viazovich (Belarus) Pavel Haranin (Belarus) Andrei Zhyulin	MAZ	3:34:47	0:46	2	(Russia) Eduard Nikolaev (Russia) Evgeny Yakovlev (Russia) Ruslan Akhmadeev	Kamaz	5:06:31	0:20
2	3	(Russia) Ayrat Mardeev (Russia) Aydar Belyaev (Russia) Dmitriy Svistunov	Kamaz	3:34:50	0:49	3	(Czech Republic) Martin Kolomý (Czech Republic) David Kilián (Czech Republic) René Kilián	Tatra	5:07:12	1:01
3	1	(Russia) Ayrat Mardeev (Russia) Aydar Belyaev (Russia) Dmitriy Svistunov	Kamaz	3:19:06		1	(Russia) Ayrat Mardeev (Russia) Aydar Belyaev (Russia) Dmitriy Svistunov	Kamaz	8:26:22	
3	2	(Russia) Andrey Karginov (Russia) Andrey Mokeev (Russia) Igor Leonov	Kamaz	3:20:57	1:51	2	(Czech Republic) Aleš Loprais (Spain) Ferran Alcayna (Belgium) Jan van der Vaet	MAN	8:34:17	7:55
3	3	(Netherlands) Gerard de Rooy (Poland) Darek Rodewald (Belgium) Jurgen Damen	Iveco	3:23:36	4:30	3	(Russia) Andrey Karginov (Russia) Andrey Mokeev (Russia) Igor Leonov	Kamaz	8:34:20	7:58
4	1	(Russia) Eduard Nikolaev (Russia) Evgeny Yakovlev (Russia) Ruslan Akhmadeev	Kamaz	2:06:54		1	(Russia) Ayrat Mardeev (Russia) Aydar Belyaev (Russia) Dmitriy Svistunov	Kamaz	10:39:26	
4	2	(Russia) Andrey Karginov (Russia) Andrey Mokeev (Russia) Igor Leonov	Kamaz	2:07:51	0:57	2	(Russia) Eduard Nikolaev (Russia) Evgeny Yakovlev (Russia) Ruslan Akhmadeev	Kamaz	10:41:23	1:57
4	3	(Russia) Ayrat Mardeev (Russia) Aydar Belyaev (Russia) Dmitriy Svistunov	Kamaz	2:13:04	6:10	3	(Russia) Andrey Karginov (Russia) Andrey Mokeev (Russia) Igor Leonov	Kamaz	10:42:11	2:45
5	1	(Russia) Eduard Nikolaev (Russia) Evgeny Yakovlev (Russia) Ruslan Akhmadeev	Kamaz	4:34:55		1	(Russia) Eduard Nikolaev (Russia) Evgeny Yakovlev (Russia) Ruslan Akhmadeev	Kamaz	15:16:18	
5	2	(Russia) Ayrat Mardeev (Russia) Aydar Belyaev (Russia) Dmitriy Svistunov	Kamaz	4:44:53	9:58	2	(Russia) Ayrat Mardeev (Russia) Aydar Belyaev (Russia) Dmitriy Svistunov	Kamaz	15:24:19	8:01
5	3	(Belarus) Siarhei Viazovich (Belarus) Pavel Haranin (Belarus) Andrei Zhyhulin	MAZ	4:50:41	15:46	3	(Czech Republic) Aleš Loprais (Spain) Ferran Alcayna (Belgium) Jan van der Vaet	MAN	15:43:46	27:28
6	1	(Russia) Eduard Nikolaev (Russia) Evgeny Yakovlev (Russia) Ruslan Akhmadeev	Kamaz	2:54:28		1	(Russia) Eduard Nikolaev (Russia) Evgeny Yakovlev (Russia) Ruslan Akhmadeev	Kamaz	18:10:46	
6	2	(Russia) Ayrat Mardeev (Russia) Aydar Belyaev (Russia) Dmitriy Svistunov	Kamaz	3:00:05	5:37	2	(Russia) Ayrat Mardeev (Russia) Aydar Belyaev (Russia) Dmitriy Svistunov	Kamaz	18:24:24	13:38
6	3	(Russia) Andrey Karginov (Russia) Andrey Mokeev (Russia) Igor Leonov	Kamaz	3:05:08	10:40	3	(Russia) Andrey Karginov (Russia) Andrey Mokeev (Russia) Igor Leonov	Kamaz	18:49:02	38:16
7	1	(Czech Republic) Aleš Loprais (Spain) Ferran Alcayna (Belgium) Jan van der Vaet	MAN	4:02:54		1	(Russia) Ayrat Mardeev (Russia) Aydar Belyaev (Russia) Dmitriy Svistunov	Kamaz	22:35:32	
7	2	(Netherlands) Gerard de Rooy (Poland) Darek Rodewald (Belgium) Jurgen Damen	Iveco	4:08:33	5:39	2	(Russia) Andrey Karginov (Russia) Andrey Mokeev (Russia) Igor Leonov	Kamaz	22:57:45	22:13
7	3	(Russia) Andrey Karginov (Russia) Andrey Mokeev (Russia) Igor Leonov	Kamaz	4:08:43	5:49	3	(Russia) Dmitry Sotnikov (Russia) Igor Devyatkin (Russia) Andrey Aferin	Kamaz	23:19:38	44:06
8	1	(Russia) Eduard Nikolaev (Russia) Evgeny Yakovlev (Russia) Ruslan Akhmadeev	Kamaz	3:25:47		1	(Russia) Ayrat Mardeev (Russia) Aydar Belyaev (Russia) Dmitriy Svistunov	Kamaz	26:33:21	
8	2	(Netherlands) Gerard de Rooy (Poland) Darek Rodewald (Belgium) Jurgen Damen	Iveco	3:37:03	11:16	2	(Russia) Andrey Karginov (Russia) Andrey Mokeev (Russia) Igor Leonov	Kamaz	26:38:30	5:09
8	3	(Russia) Andrey Karginov (Russia) Andrey Mokeev (Russia) Igor Leonov	Kamaz	3:40:45	14:58	3	(Russia) Eduard Nikolaev (Russia) Evgeny Yakovlev (Russia) Ruslan Akhmadeev	Kamaz	26:46:02	12:41
9	1	(Russia) Ayrat Mardeev (Russia) Aydar Belyaev (Russia) Dmitriy Svistunov	Kamaz	5:19:29		1	(Russia) Ayrat Mardeev (Russia) Aydar Belyaev (Russia) Dmitriy Svistunov	Kamaz	31:52:50	
9	2	(Russia) Eduard Nikolaev (Russia) Evgeny Yakovlev (Russia) Ruslan Akhmadeev	Kamaz	5:20:58	1:29	2	(Russia) Eduard Nikolaev (Russia) Evgeny Yakovlev (Russia) Ruslan Akhmadeev	Kamaz	32:07:00	14:10
9	3	(Netherlands) Gerard de Rooy (Poland) Darek Rodewald (Belgium) Jurgen Damen	Iveco	5:26:34	7:05	3	(Russia) Andrey Karginov (Russia) Andrey Mokeev (Russia) Igor Leonov	Kamaz	32:13:32	20:42
10	1	(Russia) Eduard Nikolaev (Russia) Evgeny Yakovlev (Russia) Ruslan Akhmadeev	Kamaz	4:18:17		1	(Russia) Ayrat Mardeev (Russia) Aydar Belyaev (Russia) Dmitriy Svistunov	Kamaz	36:11:56	
10	2	(Russia) Ayrat Mardeev (Russia) Aydar Belyaev (Russia) Dmitriy Svistunov	Kamaz	4:19:06	0:49	2	(Russia) Eduard Nikolaev (Russia) Evgeny Yakovlev (Russia) Ruslan Akhmadeev	Kamaz	36:25:17	13:21
10	3	(Belarus) Siarhei Viazovich (Belarus) Pavel Haranin (Belarus) Andrei Zhyhulin	MAZ	4:19:36	1:19	3	(Russia) Andrey Karginov (Russia) Andrey Mokeev (Russia) Igor Leonov	Kamaz	36:54:42	42:46
11	1	(Netherlands) Hans Stacey (Belgium) Serge Bruynkens (Netherlands) Bernard der Kinderen	Iveco	2:08:11		1	(Russia) Ayrat Mardeev (Russia) Aydar Belyaev (Russia) Dmitriy Svistunov	Kamaz	38:24:13	
11	2	(Netherlands) Gerard de Rooy (Poland) Darek Rodewald (Belgium) Jurgen Damen	Iveco	2:09:21	1:10	2	(Russia) Eduard Nikolaev (Russia) Evgeny Yakovlev (Russia) Ruslan Akhmadeev	Kamaz	38:35:24	11:11
11	3	(Russia) Eduard Nikolaev (Russia) Evgeny Yakovlev (Russia) Ruslan Akhmadeev	Kamaz	2:10:07	1:56	3	(Russia) Andrey Karginov (Russia) Andrey Mokeev (Russia) Igor Leonov	Kamaz	39:11:57	47:44
12	1	(Netherlands) Hans Stacey (Belgium) Serge Bruynkens (Netherlands) Bernard der Kinderen	Iveco	3:33:39		1	(Russia) Ayrat Mardeev (Russia) Aydar Belyaev (Russia) Dmitriy Svistunov	Kamaz	41:59:07	
12	2	(Netherlands) Marcel van Vliet (Netherlands) Marcel Pronk (Germany) Artur Klein	MAN	3:33:57	0:18	2	(Russia) Eduard Nikolaev (Russia) Evgeny Yakovlev (Russia) Ruslan Akhmadeev	Kamaz	42:11:50	12:43
12	3	(Netherlands) Gerard de Rooy (Poland) Darek Rodewald (Belgium) Jurgen Damen	Iveco	3:34:07	0:28	3	(Russia) Andrey Karginov (Russia) Andrey Mokeev (Russia) Igor Leonov	Kamaz	42:47:47	48:40
13	1	(Netherlands) Hans Stacey (Belgium) Serge Bruynkens (Netherlands) Bernard der Kinderen	Iveco	20:31		1	(Russia) Ayrat Mardeev (Russia) Aydar Belyaev (Russia) Dmitriy Svistunov	Kamaz	42:22:01	
13	2	(Netherlands) Marcel van Vliet (Netherlands) Marcel Pronk (Germany) Artur Klein	MAN	21:52	1:21	2	(Russia) Eduard Nikolaev (Russia) Evgeny Yakovlev (Russia) Ruslan Akhmadeev	Kamaz	42:35:53	13:52
13	3	(Russia) Ayrat Mardeev (Russia) Aydar Belyaev (Russia) Dmitriy Svistunov	Kamaz	22:54	2:23	3	(Russia) Andrey Karginov (Russia) Andrey Mokeev (Russia) Igor Leonov	Kamaz	43:13:01	51:00

== Final standings ==
=== Bikes ===
Pos	No.	Rider	Bike	Entrant	Time	Gap
1	1	(Spain) Marc Coma	KTM 450 Rally	Red Bull KTM Factory Racing	46:03:49	
2	7	(Portugal) Paulo Gonçalves	Honda	HRC Rally	46:20:42	+16:53
3	26	(Australia) Toby Price	KTM 450 Rally	Red Bull KTM Rally Factory Team	46:27:03	+23:14
4	31	(Chile) Pablo Quintanilla	KTM 450 Rally	Transportes Artisa	46:42:27	+38:38
5	18	(Slovakia) Štefan Svitko	KTM 450 Rally	Slovnaft Team	46:48:06	+44:17
6	11	(Portugal) Ruben Faria	KTM 450 Rally	Red Bull KTM Factory Racing	48:01:39	+1:57:50
7	9	(France) David Casteu	KTM 450 Rally	Team Casteu	48:04:03	+2:00:14
8	21	(Slovakia) Ivan Jakeš	KTM 450 Rally	Jakes Dakar Team	48:22:07	+2:18:18
9	29	(Spain) Laia Sanz	Honda	Honda Rally	48:28:10	+2:24:21
10	3	(France) Olivier Pain	Yamaha	Yamaha Factory Racing	49:12:58	+3:09:09

=== Quads ===
Pos	No.	Rider	Quad	Time	Gap
1	251	(Poland) Rafał Sonik	Yamaha	57:18:39	
2	261	(Argentina) Jeremías González	Yamaha	60:13:29	+2:54:50
3	283	(Bolivia) Walter Nosiglia	Honda	61:01:35	+3:42:56
4	256	(Paraguay) Nelson Sanabria	Yamaha	61:28:36	+4:09:57
5	260	(France) Christophe Declerck	Yamaha	63:07:19	+5:48:40
6	270	(Argentina) Daniel Domaszewski	Honda	65:54:49	+8:36:10
7	257	(Chile) Sebastián Palma	Can-Am	67:48:53	+10:30:14
8	265	(Argentina) Santiago Hansen	Honda	70:43:09	+13:24:30
9	286	(South Africa) Willem Saaijman	Yamaha	70:47:17	+13:28:38
10	295	(Brazil) André Suguita	Can-Am	79:39:53	+22:21:14

=== Cars ===
Pos	No.	Driver	Co-driver	Car	Entrant	Time	Gap
1	301	(Qatar) Nasser Al-Attiyah	(France) Matthieu Baumel	Mini	Qatar Raid Team	40:32:25	
2	303	(South Africa) Giniel de Villiers	(Germany) Dirk von Zitzewitz	Toyota	Imperial Toyota	41:07:59	+35:54
3	307	(Poland) Krzysztof Hołowczyc	(France) Xavier Panseri	Mini	Monster Energy; X-Raid Team	42:04:26	+1:32:01
4	314	(Netherlands) Erik van Loon	(Netherlands) Wouter Rosegaar	Mini	XDakar	43:34:17	+3:01:52
5	310	(Russia) Vladimir Vasilyev	(Russia) Konstantin Zhiltsov	Mini	G-Energy Team	43:45:06	+3:12:41
6	309	(France) Christian Lavieille	(France) Pascal Maimon	Toyota	Overdrive	43:48:23	+3:15:58
7	315	(Netherlands) Bernhard ten Brinke	(Belgium) Tom Colsoul	Toyota	Overdrive	44:14:27	+3:42:02
8	306	(Portugal) Carlos Sousa	(Portugal) Paulo Fiuza	Mitsubishi	Mitsubishi Petrobras	44:17:24	+3:44:59
9	329	(Kazakhstan) Aidyn Rakhimbayev	(Russia) Anton Nikolaev	Mini	Astana Dakar Team	44:41:09	+4:08:44
10	320	(France) Ronan Chabot	(France) Gilles Pillot	SMG	Toys Motors-SMG	45:15:01	+4:42:36

=== Trucks ===
Pos	No.	Driver	Co-drivers	Truck	Entrant	Time	Gap
1	507	(Russia) Ayrat Mardeev	(Russia) Aydar Belyaev (Russia) Dmitriy Svistunov	Kamaz	Kamaz-Master	42:22:01	
2	502	(Russia) Eduard Nikolaev	(Russia) Evgeny Yakovlev (Russia) Ruslan Akhmadeev	Kamaz	Kamaz-Master	42:35:53	+13:52
3	500	(Russia) Andrey Karginov	(Russia) Andrey Mokeev (Russia) Igor Leonov	Kamaz	Kamaz-Master	43:13:01	+51:00
4	503	(Czech Republic) Aleš Loprais	(Spain) Ferran Alcayna (Belgium) Jan van der Vaet	MAN	Eurol/Veka MAN Rally Team	44:18:38	+1:56:37
5	520	(Russia) Dmitry Sotnikov	(Russia) Igor Devyatkin (Russia) Andrey Aferin	Kamaz	Kamaz-Master	44:46:33	+2:24:32
6	504	(Netherlands) Hans Stacey	(Belgium) Serge Bruynkens (Netherlands) Bernard der Kinderen	Iveco	Petronas Team De Rooy Iveco	44:51:30	+2:29:29
7	506	(Czech Republic) Martin Kolomý	(Czech Republic) David Kilián (Czech Republic) René Kilián	Tatra	Tatra Buggyra Racing	46:29:30	+4:07:29
8	508	(Netherlands) Marcel van Vliet	(Netherlands) Marcel Pronk (Germany) Artur Klein	MAN	Eurol/Veka MAN Rally Team	46:41:42	+4:19:41
9	501	(Netherlands) Gerard de Rooy	(Poland) Darek Rodewald (Belgium) Jurgen Damen	Iveco	Petronas Team De Rooy Iveco	49:30:42	+7:08:41
10	535	(Belarus) Aleksandr Vasilevski	(Belarus) Valery Kazlouski (Belarus) Anton Zaparoshchanka	MAZ	MAZ-Sport auto	49:31:00	+7:08:59
