= Martin Kolomý =

Czech rally raid truck driver (born 1973)

Martin Kolomý (born May 26, 1973 in Bruntál) is a Czech rally raid truck driver.

== Dakar Rally results ==
| Year | Class | Vehicle | Position | Stages won |
|---|---|---|---|---|
| 2010 | Trucks | (Czech Republic) Tatra | DNF | 0 |
| 2011 | Trucks | (Czech Republic) Tatra | DNF | 0 |
| 2012 | Trucks | (Czech Republic) Tatra | 7th | 0 |
| 2013 | Trucks | (Czech Republic) Tatra | 5th | 0 |
| 2014 | Trucks | (Czech Republic) Tatra | DNF | 0 |
| 2015 | Trucks | (Czech Republic) Tatra | 7th | 0 |
| 2016 | Trucks | (Czech Republic) Tatra | 17th | 1 |
| 2017 | Trucks | (Czech Republic) Tatra | 15th | 1 |
| 2018 | Trucks | (Czech Republic) Tatra | 11th | 0 |
| 2019 | Trucks | (Czech Republic) Tatra | DNF | 0 |
| 2020 | Cars | (United States) Ford | DNF | 0 |

- In progress
