= Ignacio Casale =

Chilean racing driver (born 1987)

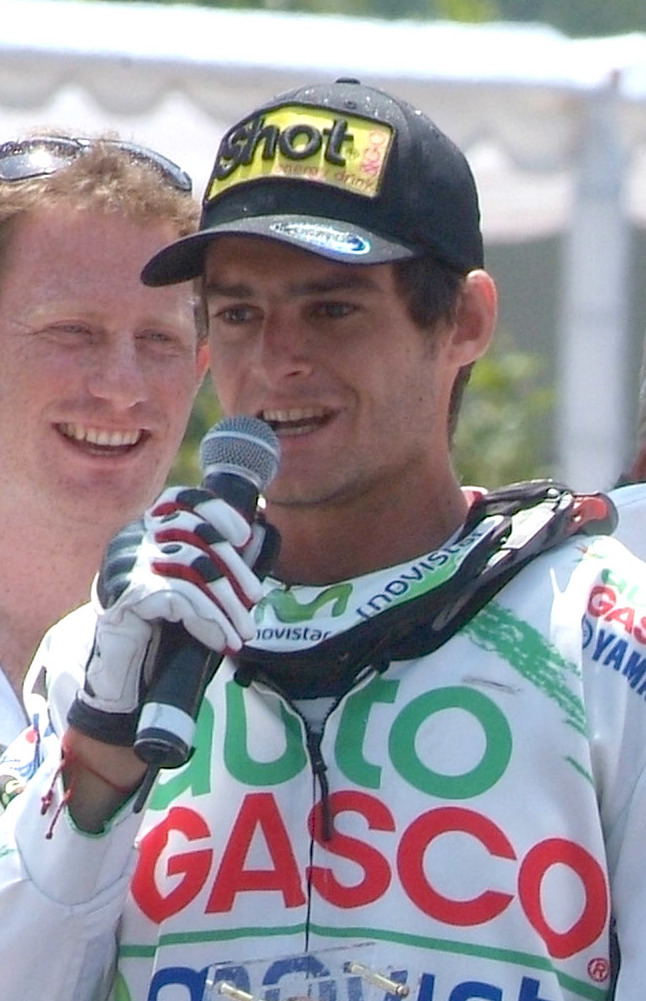
- Chilean rider Ignacio Casale
- Born: 27 April 1987 (age 39) Santiago, Chile

Dakar Rally career
- Debut season: 2010
- Current team: Yamaha
- Car number: 361
- Wins: 2 (Quads)

Ignacio Nicolás Casale Catraccia (born 27 April 1987) is a four-wheeler motorcycle rider who won three times in the quad bike category of Dakar Rally. He moved to the UTV category after his second victory on the Dakar Rally in 2018.

== Biography ==
Ignacio is the son of Francisco Casale, an off-roader competing in the Jeep Fun Race in Chile in the 1980s and 1990s, and Mónica Catracchia. He shares the love of motorsport from his father and uncle, beginning to race in motocross competitions and race as the co-driver for his father in the Dakar Rally.

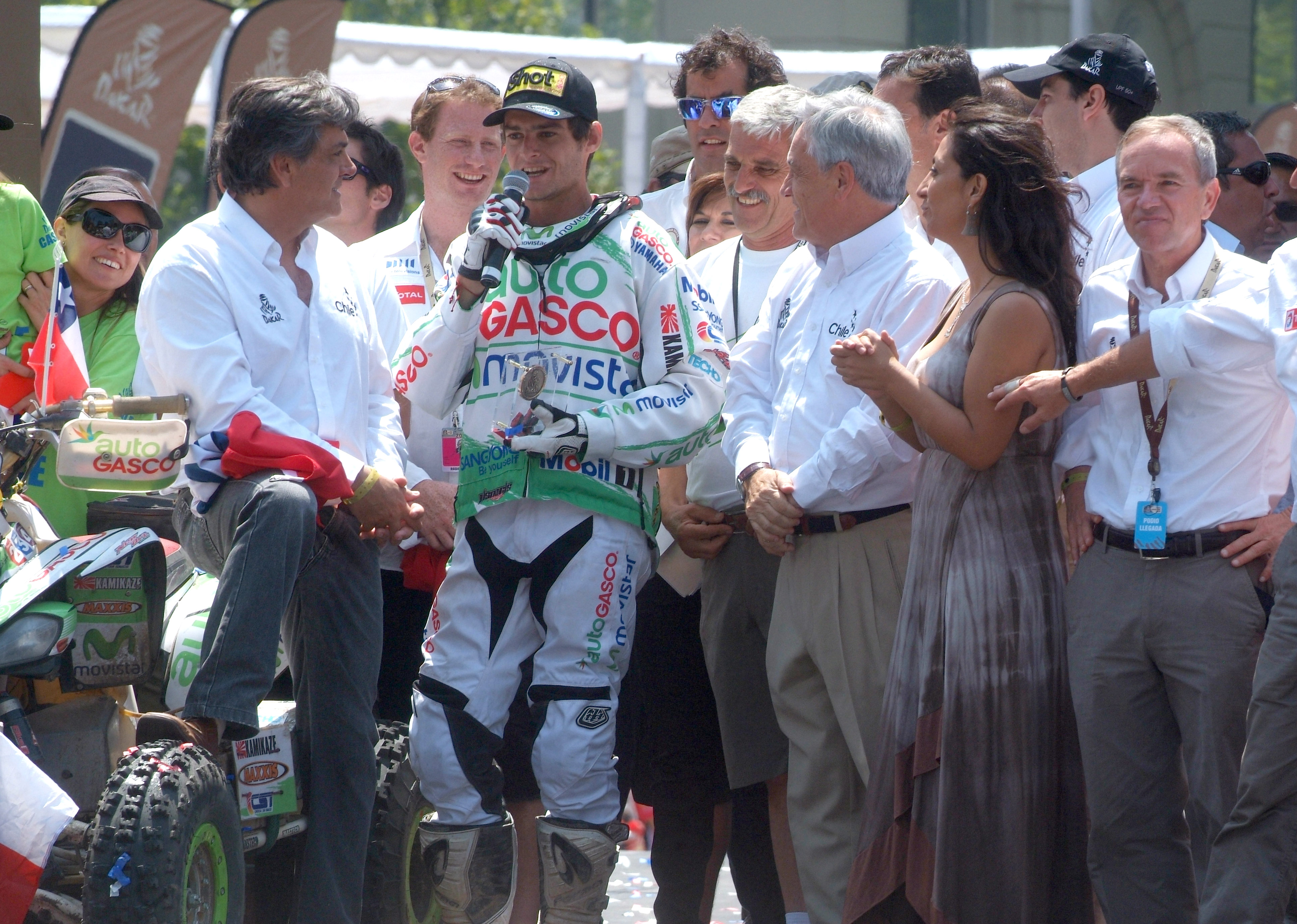
Ignacio Casale at the 2013 Dakar Rally awards ceremony

== Career ==
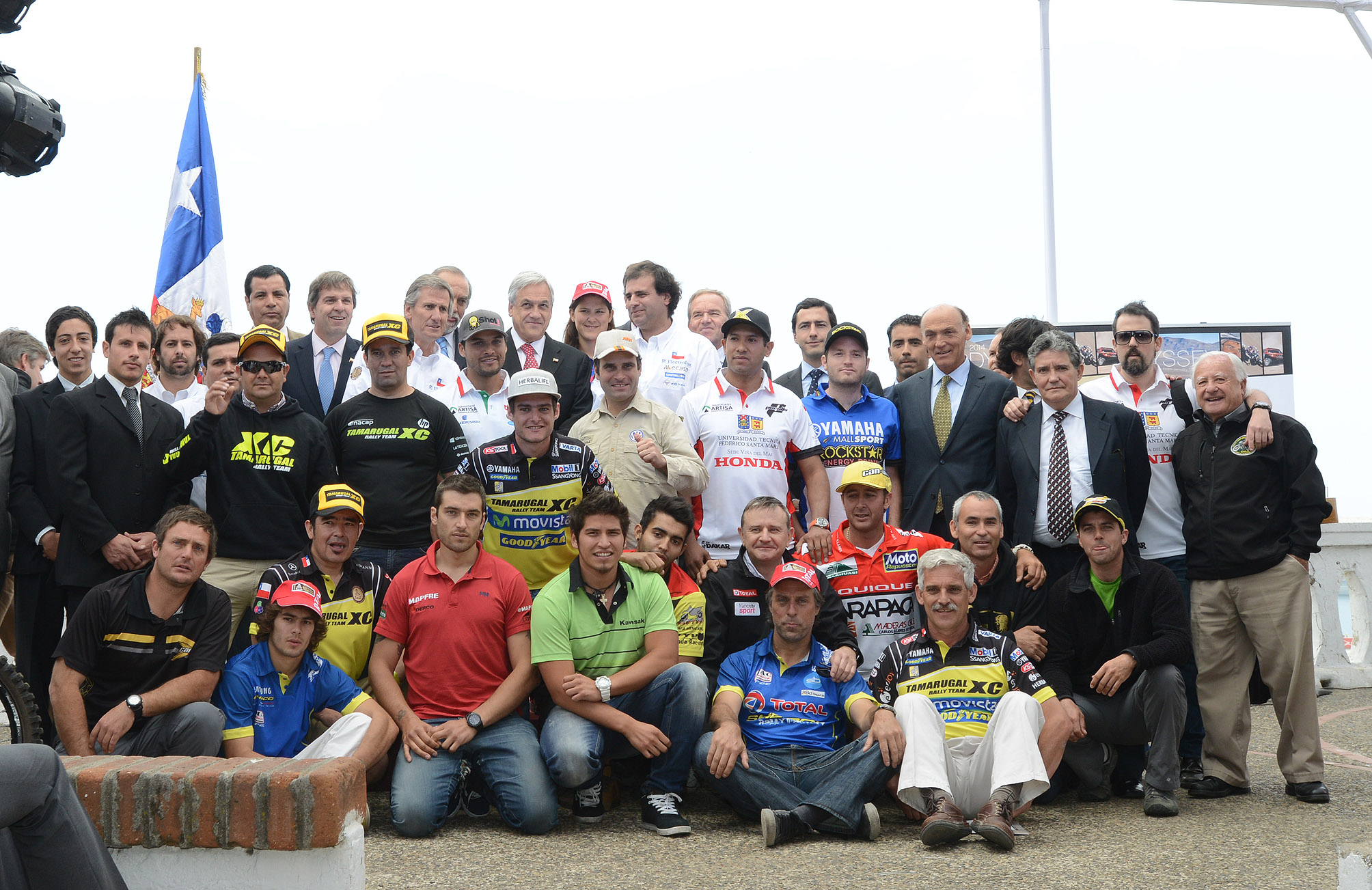
Ignacio Casale 2014 Dakar Rally

Casale took part in the 2010 Dakar Rally with his father, competing in the Trucks category. They finished in 26th place, earning Casale a wild card place in the 2011 Dakar Rally, where he finished 40th in the motorcycle category. The following year he competed in the four-wheeler category and finished in fourth place, the highest ranked Chilean rider. In the 2013 Dakar Rally he won the seventh stage, becoming the first Chilean to win a stage in the Four-Wheeler category. He went to come second overall, behind Marcos Patronelli, the best result achieved by any Chilean in the history of the Dakar Rally.

In 2014, after 14 days and 5,000 miles of riding through the Argentinean and Chilean Andes, Bolivian salt plains and the Atacama Desert, Casale won his first Dakar victory.

Casale performed well throughout the 2014 Dakar Rally, finishing first in seven of the 13 stages (stages 1, 6, 7, 8, 11, 12 and 13) and holding the overall number one spot from stage 7 through to the end.

Casale later meet Chilean president Sebastián Piñera at La Moneda Palace in Santiago. He has told the media that he intends to defend his Quad title at the 2015 Dakar Rally.

In the 2015 Dakar Rally, Casale retired in stage 10 due to a mechanical problem after winning three stages and being the leader of the general classification of the first two stages and the eighth stage. He would then retire in the 6th stage of 2016 Dakar Rally due to an accident. The 2017 Dakar Rally saw a return to form with a runner-up finish and two stage wins in the quad category. He would then win his second Dakar title in the quad category of the 2018 Dakar Rally.

Casale began racing in the UTV category since his run at the 2018 Atacama Rally in Chile. In the 2019 Dakar Rally, he moved to the UTV category and raced with Americo Aliaga as his co-driver. He won the 2020 Dakar Rally.

== See also ==
- Sports in Chile

Sporting positions
Preceded by Marcos Patronelli	Dakar Rally; Quad Winner; 2014	Succeeded by Rafał Sonik
Preceded by Sergey Karyakin	Dakar Rally; Quad Winner; 2018	Succeeded by Nicolás Cavigliasso
