= Rafał Sonik =

Polish quad rally driver (born 1966)

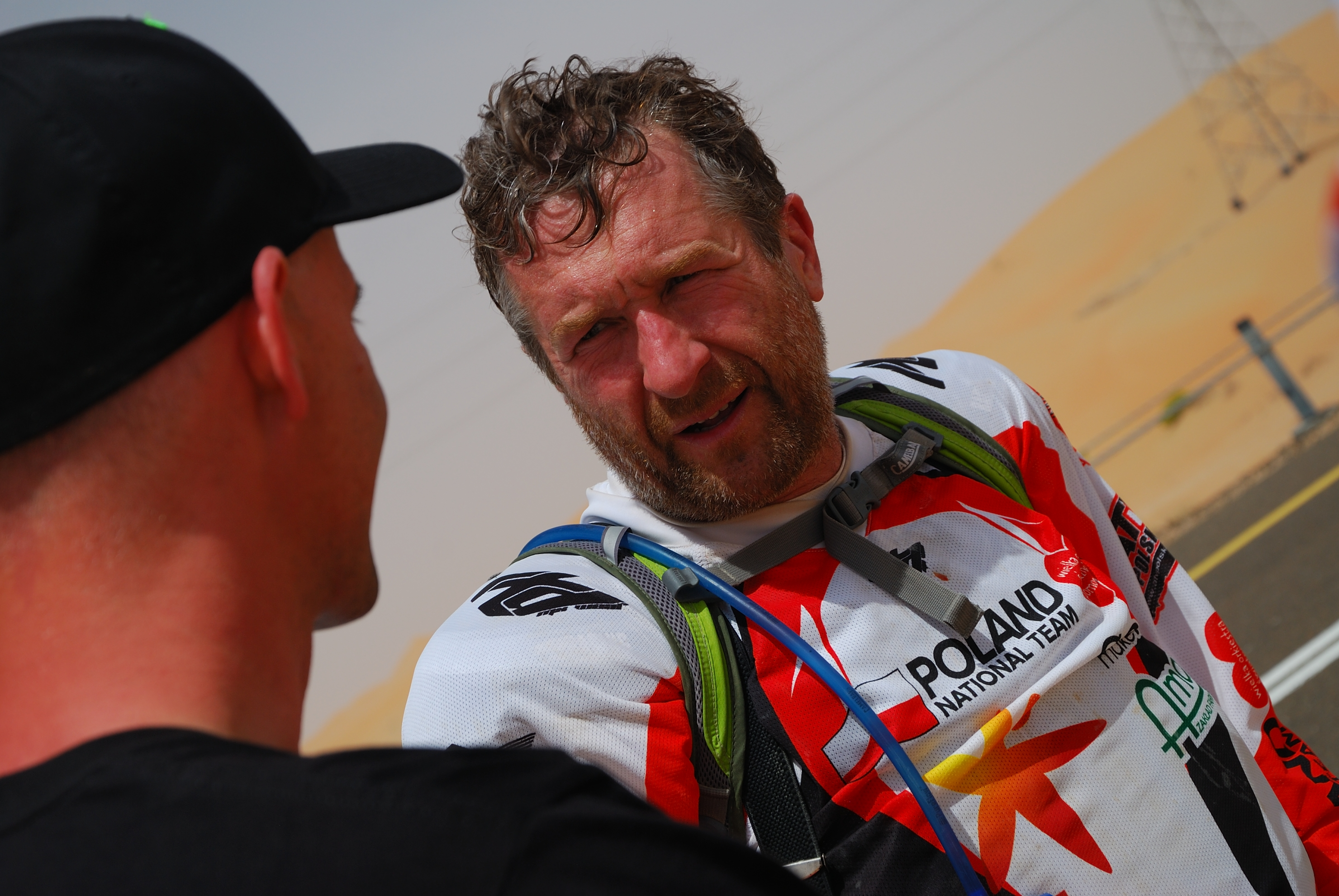
- Kulig in 2013, Abu Dhabi
- Born: 3 June 1966 (age 60); Kraków, Poland
- Occupation: quad rally driver

Rafał Krzysztof Sonik (born 3 June 1966 in Kraków, Poland) is a Polish quad rally driver. He is the second Polish driver to win the Dakar Rally (2015). Before that, he had claimed the second and twice the third place. He won the FIM World Cup three times, and is a five-time Polish Champion winner in endurance racing (2K class – quads with rear-wheel drive).

== Career ==
=== Season 2020 ===
3rd place in the Dakar Rally

=== Season 2017 ===
4th place in the Dakar Rally

=== Season 2015 ===
1st place in the Dakar Rally

=== Season 2014 ===
Winner of the World Cup Cross-Country Quads classification 2nd place in the Dakar Rally 1st place in the Abu Dhabi Desert Challenge 2nd place in the Qatar Rally 1st place in the Faraon's Rally 1st place in the Sardinia Rally 2nd place in the Brasil Rally 1st place in the Marocco Rally

=== Season 2013 ===
2nd place in the World Cup FIM Cross-Country Quads classification. 3rd place in the Dakar Rally 3rd place in the Abu Zabi Rally 1st place in the Qatar Rally 1st place in the Sardinia Rally 1st place in the Argentina Rally 4th place in the Brasil Rally 1st place in the Marocco Rally

=== Season 2012 ===
4th place in the Dakar Rally 2nd place in the World Cup FIM Cross-Country Quads classification. 8th place in the Abu Zabi Rally 1st place in the Qatar Rally 2nd place in the Sardinia Rally 2nd place in the Egyptian Rally

=== Season 2011 ===
Dakar – unfinished due to an injury which eliminated him from the whole 2011 season.

=== Season 2010 ===
V place in the Dakar Rally Winner of the World Cup Cross-Country Quads classification 2nd place in the Faraon Rally 1st place in the Brasil Rally 2nd place in the Sardinia Rally 1st place in the Tunisia Rally 4th place in the Abu Dhabi Desert Challenge

=== Season 2009 ===
3rd place in the Dakar Rally During the 1st qualifiers to the World Cup - Abu Dhabi Desert Challenge - Sonik has broken his hand making it impossible for him to continue in the next WC rounds. 21st place in the "12 hours of Pont de Vaux"

=== Season 2008 ===
Polish Champion title in the Enduro Rally class 2K 3rd place in the w Quad Cross Country Polish Championship class 2K 30th place in the "12 hours of Pont de Vaux"

=== Season 2007 ===
Polish Champion title in the Enduro Rally class 2K 4th place in the Polish Motor Association Cup in Quad Cross Country class 2K 5th place in the Quad Golden Cup

=== Season 2006 ===
Due to a collision with another driver on the Endurance Rally in May 2006 Sonik has suffered severe injuries. He has gone through several complicated operations which caused him to be eliminated from the further competitions in 2006.

=== Season 2005 ===
Polish Champion title in the Enduro Rally class 2K Polish Champion in the Quad Motocross, class Open. 1st in the Quad Silver Cup. 1st in the Polish Quad Cross-Country Cup. 1st start in the "12 hours of Pont de Vaux" 2005 (Honda TRX 450R).

=== Season 2004 ===
Polish Champion title in the Enduro Rally class 2K Silesian Cross-Country Quad Champion class Open (Mistrz Śląska w Country Crossie Quadów, klasa Open).

=== Season 2003 ===
Polish Champion title in the Enduro Rally class 2K Silesian Cross-Country Quad Champion class 2K. 2nd place in the Polish Motor Association Cup in Quad Cross Country class Open. start w "12 hours of Pont de Vaux" 2003 (Yamaha Banshee).

=== Season 2002 ===
1st place in the Polish Speedway Quad Club Cup 2002. 4th place in the Polish Motor Association Enduro Cup class 2K. 27th place in "12 hours of Pont de Vaux" 2002 (Yamaha Raptor 660).

=== Season 2001 ===
3rd place in the Polish Motor Association Enduro Cup class 2K.

Sporting positions
Preceded by Ignacio Casale	Dakar Rally; Quad Winner; 2015	Succeeded by Marcos Patronelli
