= Dakar Series =

Rally raid series from 2008 to 2019

The Dakar Series was an annual series of rally raid off-road races, organised by the A.S.O. The series groups together events similar in style to the Dakar Rally and was founded in 2008 after the cancellation of the 2008 edition of the rally.

== History ==
The Dakar Series was born in 2008, with the cancellation of this year's edition, in anticipation of a year of the A.S.O. program. To create a rally raid series affiliated with the Dakar, it will be part of a single calendar (the final date must be the owner of the edition of the rally raid for the next year). The first event that inaugurated the series was the Central Europe Rally, followed by the PAX Rally and which included a car, motorcycle, quad and truck.

From the second edition, further new events were added, with safety and organizational measures, and media attention, equal to those of the Dakar. In 2009, 2010 and 2011, the series consisted of a single event with the Silk Way Rally entering the calendar, which took place over the following three years between Russia, Kazakhstan and Turkmenistan. In 2012, the Silk Way Rally was replaced by the Desafio Litoral, a rally raid held entirely in Argentina, and in turn replaced by two new events in 2013: the Desafio Ruta 40 (also held in Argentina and successor to the Desafio Litoral) and the Desafío Inca (which takes place in Peru). With the entry of the Desafio Guarani into the calendar the following year, the series reached a record number of three events, giving life to a preparation process in view of the Dakar to be held entirely in South America.

In 2016, after the cancellation of the Desafio Inca the previous year and the passage of the Desafio Ruta 40 to the Dakar Challenge circuit, there was only one event left on the calendar, making its debut in the series, namely the Merzouga Rally (which takes place over five days in Morocco). The following year A.S.O. also included the newly formed Dakar Series China Rally, bringing the number of events to two.

In 2018, the Desafio Ruta 40 and the Desafio Inca return to the calendar, while the Dakar Series China Rally comes out. With the Dakar moving to Saudi Arabia in 2019, the competition calendar once again features just one event (the Merzouga Rally).

In 2020, the Merzouga Rally was finally cancelled due to the COVID-19 pandemic. The organizers postponed it until its next edition on 2021, which it never took place. Since then, no rally has been held under the Dakar Series label.

== Rallies ==
Year	Rally	Route	Bikes					Cars					Trucks				
Year	Rally	Route	Pos	Rider	Make	Time	Gap	Pos	Driver/Navigator	Make	Time	Gap	Pos	Driver/Navigators	Make	Time	Gap
2008	Central Europe Rally	(Hungary) Budapest: (Romania) Baia Mare; (Hungary) Balatonfüred	1	(France) David Casteu	KTM	12:21:14		1	(Spain) Carlos Sainz (France) Michel Périn	Volkswagen	11:18:08		1	(Netherlands) Hans Stacey (Belgium) Eddy Chevaillier (Netherlands) Bernard der Kinderen	MAN	11:43:20	
2008	Central Europe Rally	(Hungary) Budapest: (Romania) Baia Mare; (Hungary) Balatonfüred	2	(Chile) Francisco López Contardo	KTM	12:24:12	2:58	2	(France) Stéphane Peterhansel (France) Jean-Paul Cottret	Mitsubishi	11:20:09	2:01	2	(Netherlands) Wulfert van Ginkel (Netherlands) Daniel Bruinsma (Netherlands) Richard de Rooij	GINAF	12:17:03	33:43
2008	Central Europe Rally	(Hungary) Budapest: (Romania) Baia Mare; (Hungary) Balatonfüred	3	(France) Alain Duclos	KTM	12:40:53	19:39	3	(Germany) Dieter Depping (Germany) Timo Gottschalk	Volkswagen	11:24:42	6:34	3	(Czech Republic) Aleš Loprais (Czech Republic) Ladislav Lála (Czech Republic) Milan Holáň	Tatra	12:36:38	53:18
2008	PAX Rally	(Portugal) Lisbon: (Portugal) Portimão	1	(Portugal) Ruben Faria	Honda	12:16:39		1	(France) Stéphane Peterhansel (France) Jean-Paul Cottret	Mitsubishi	11:15:00						
2008	PAX Rally	(Portugal) Lisbon: (Portugal) Portimão	2	(France) Cyril Despres	KTM	12:22:44	6:05	2	(France) Luc Alphand (France) Gilles Picard	Mitsubishi	11:18:00	3:00					
2008	PAX Rally	(Portugal) Lisbon: (Portugal) Portimão	3	(Spain) Marc Coma	KTM	12:24:31	7:52	3	(Qatar) Nasser Al-Attiyah (Sweden) Tina Thörner	BMW	11:21:00	6:00					
2009	Silk Way Rally	(Russia) Kazan: (Kazakhstan) Oral; (Turkmenistan) Ashgabat						1	(Spain) Carlos Sainz (Spain) Lucas Cruz	Volkswagen	24:12:21		1	(Russia) Firdaus Kabirov (Russia) Andrey Mokeev (Russia) Anatoley Tanin	Kamaz	28:13:52	
2009	Silk Way Rally	(Russia) Kazan: (Kazakhstan) Oral; (Turkmenistan) Ashgabat						2	(United States) Mark Miller (South Africa) Ralph Pitchford	Volkswagen	24:34:13	20:52	2	(Netherlands) Gérard de Rooy (Belgium) Tom Colsoul (Netherlands) Darek Rodewald	Iveco	29:16:17	1:02:25
2009	Silk Way Rally	(Russia) Kazan: (Kazakhstan) Oral; (Turkmenistan) Ashgabat						3	(South Africa) Giniel de Villiers (Germany) Dirk von Zitzewitz	Volkswagen	24:40:30	28:09	3	(Czech Republic) Aleš Loprais (Slovakia) Jaroslav Miškolci (Czech Republic) Milan Holáň	Tatra	29:56:12	1:42:40
2010	Silk Way Rally	(Russia) Saint Petersburg: (Russia) Sochi						1	(Spain) Carlos Sainz (Spain) Lucas Cruz	Volkswagen	19:42:02		1	(Russia) Eduard Nikolaev (Russia) Vyatcheslav Mizyukaev (Russia) Vladimir Rybakov	Kamaz	22:56:21	
2010	Silk Way Rally	(Russia) Saint Petersburg: (Russia) Sochi						2	(Qatar) Nasser Al-Attiyah (Germany) Timo Gottschalk	Volkswagen	19:50:29	8:27	2	(Russia) Vladimir Chagin (Russia) Sergey Savostin (Russia) Ildar Shaysultanov	Kamaz	23:18:49	22:28
2010	Silk Way Rally	(Russia) Saint Petersburg: (Russia) Sochi						3	(United States) Mark Miller (South Africa) Ralph Pitchford	Volkswagen	20:22:24	40:22	3	(Russia) Firdaus Kabirov (Russia) Andrey Mokeev (Russia) Aydar Belyaev	Kamaz	23:24:42	28:21
2011	Silk Way Rally	(Russia) Moscow: (Russia) Sochi						1	(Poland) Krzysztof Holowczyc (Belgium) Jean-Marc Fortin	BMW	5:11:27		1	(Czech Republic) Aleš Loprais (Czech Republic) Milan Holáň (Czech Republic) Vojtěch Štajf	Tatra	8:23:15	
2011	Silk Way Rally	(Russia) Moscow: (Russia) Sochi						2	(France) Stéphane Peterhansel (France) Jean-Paul Cottret	Mini	7:10:55	1:59:28	2	(Russia) Firdaus Kabirov (Russia) Andrey Mokeev (Russia) Anatoley Tanin	Kamaz	8:39:56	16:41
2011	Silk Way Rally	(Russia) Moscow: (Russia) Sochi						3	(Russia) Alexandre Zheludov (Belarus) Andrey Rudnitskiy	Nissan	8:36:00	3:24:33	3	(Russia) Andrey Karginov (Russia) Vyatcheslav Mizyukaev (Russia) Igor Devyatkin	Kamaz	9:01:51	38:36
2012	Desafio Litoral	(Argentina) Puerto Iguazú: (Argentina) Resistencia	1	(France) Cyril Despres	KTM	13:56:54		1	(Argentina) Orlando Terranova (Portugal) Paulo Fiuza	BMW	12:48:06						
2012	Desafio Litoral	(Argentina) Puerto Iguazú: (Argentina) Resistencia	2	(Poland) Kuba Przygoński	KTM	14:01:39	4:45	2	(Spain) Nani Roma (France) Michel Périn	Mini	12:14:45	26:39					
2012	Desafio Litoral	(Argentina) Puerto Iguazú: (Argentina) Resistencia	3	(Argentina) Mauricio Gomez	Yamaha	15:00:09	1:03:15	3	(Chile) Boris Garafulic (France) Gilles Picard	Mini	14:28:02	1:39:56					
2013	Desafio Ruta 40	(Argentina) S.S. de Jujuy: (Argentina) San Juan	1	(United States) Kurt Caselli	KTM	18:10:20		1	(Spain) Nani Roma (France) Michel Périn	Mini	19:50:50						
2013	Desafio Ruta 40	(Argentina) S.S. de Jujuy: (Argentina) San Juan	2	(Chile) Francisco López Contardo	KTM	18:11:03	0:43	2	(Argentina) Orlando Terranova (Portugal) Paulo Fiuza	Mini	19:52:55	2:05					
2013	Desafio Ruta 40	(Argentina) S.S. de Jujuy: (Argentina) San Juan	3	(Spain) Marc Coma	KTM	18:21:13	10:53	3	(Bolivia) Marco Bulacia (Argentina) Benjamin Lozada	Toyota	25:59:14	6:08:24					
2013	Desafio Inca	(Peru) Paracas: (Peru) Paracas	1	(Chile) Pablo Quintanilla	KTM	11:56:05		1	(Brazil) Guilherme Spinelli (Brazil) Youssef Haddad	Mitsubishi	11:29:40						
2013	Desafio Inca	(Peru) Paracas: (Peru) Paracas	2	(France) David Casteu	Yamaha	12:05:34	9:29	2	(Peru) Francisco León (Peru) Tomas Hirahoka	Mitsubishi	13:22:18	1:52:38					
2013	Desafio Inca	(Peru) Paracas: (Peru) Paracas	3	(Peru) Eduardo Heinrich	Honda	12:27:19	31:14	3	(Peru) Diego Weber (Peru) Alonso Carrillo	Toyota	13:39:45	2:10:05					
2014	Desafio Ruta 4	(Argentina) Bariloche - (Argentina) San Juan	1	(Argentina) Javier Pozzolito	Honda	10:34:50		1	(Argentina) Juan Manuel Silva (Argentina) Eduardo Lopez	Prototipo	11:29:43						
2014	Desafio Ruta 4	(Argentina) Bariloche - (Argentina) San Juan	2	(France) David Casteu	KTM	10:41:10	6:20	2	(Chile) Rodrigo Moreno (Chile) Jorge Araya	Toyota	12:14:31	44:48					
2014	Desafio Ruta 4	(Argentina) Bariloche - (Argentina) San Juan	3	(Chile) Pablo Quintanilla	KTM	10:47:57	13:07	3	(Argentina) Martin Maldonado (Argentina) Sebastian Scholtz	Prototipo	13:28:23	1:58:40					
2014	Desafio Guarani	(Paraguay) Asunción - (Paraguay) Encarnación	1	(Chile) Francisco López Contardo	KTM	4:51:09		1	(Argentina) Juan Manuel Silva (Argentina) Eduardo Lopez	Colcar	4:58:27						
2014	Desafio Guarani	(Paraguay) Asunción - (Paraguay) Encarnación	2	(France) David Casteu	KTM	4:53:09	2:00	2	(Paraguay) Viktor Rempel (Paraguay) Vernon Rempel	Audi	4:58:44	0:17					
2014	Desafio Guarani	(Paraguay) Asunción - (Paraguay) Encarnación	3	(Chile) Pablo Quintanilla	KTM	5:01:07	9:58	3	(Bolivia) Marco Bulacia (Bolivia) Abel Salazar	Toyota	5:15:11	16:44					
2014	Desafio Inca	(Peru) Paracas - (Peru) Paracas	1	(Chile) Claudio Rodriguez	KTM	13:00:07		1	(Spain) Nani Roma (France) Michel Périn	Mini	13:21:48						
2014	Desafio Inca	(Peru) Paracas - (Peru) Paracas	2	(Chile) José Cornejo	Suzuki	13:00:10	0:03	2	(Chile) Rodrigo Moreno (Chile) Jorge Arraya	Wicked	14:59:30	1:37:42					
2014	Desafio Inca	(Peru) Paracas - (Peru) Paracas	3	(France) David Casteu	KTM	13:04:19	4:12	3	(Peru) Diego Weber (Peru) Alonso Carrillo	Toyota	15:45:09	2:23:21					

2015:
(Argentina) Desafio Ruta 40: 17–23 May
- moto winner: Paulo Gonçalves (Honda)
- auto winner: Orlando Terranova/Bernard Graue (Mini)
(Paraguay) Desafio Guarani: 19–25 July
- moto winner: Kevin Benavides (Honda)
- auto winner: Peter Jerie/Laurent Lichtleuchter (Toyota)
(Peru) Desafio Inca: 10–13 September
- cancelled

2016:
(Morocco) Merzouga Rally: 21–27 May
- moto winner: Kevin Benavides (Honda)
- quad winner: Clemens Eicker (E-ATV)
- sxs winner: Frederic Henrichy/Eric Bersey (Polaris)

2017:
(Morocco) Merzouga Rally: 7–12 May
- moto winner: Xavier de Soultrait (Yamaha)
- quad winner: Nicolas Cavigliasso (Yamaha)
- sxs winner: Frederic Henrichy/Eric Bersey (Polaris)

2018:
(Morocco) Merzouga Rally: 15–20 April
- moto winner: Joan Barreda (Honda)
- quad winner: Axel Dutrie (Yamaha)
- sxs winner: Bruno Varela/Gustavo Gugelmin (Can-Am)

2019:
(Morocco) Merzouga Rally: 31 March-5 April
- moto winner: Adrien van Beveren (Yamaha)
- quad winner: Axel Dutrie (Yamaha)
- sxs winner: Nasser Al-Attiyah/Matthieu Baumel (Can-Am)

== Dakar Challenge/Road To Dakar ==
Together with the Dakar Series, the A.S.O. also established the Dakar Challenge in 2011, a circuit parallel to but sometimes also internal to the Dakar Series (in fact, even the Dakar Series events can host within them a race valid for the Dakar Challenge circuit, as, for example, happened with the Desafio Inca). The Dakar Challenge changed its name in 2018, becoming the Road to Dakar.

Participants to be admitted to the Road to Dakar category must:

- never having participated in the Dakar;
- not having finished in the top ten positions of an FIM rally;
- not being part of the FIA and FIA SXS priority driver lists;
- not being part of the A.S.O. lists Elite SXS;
- never having won the Road to Dakar in the past.

Thanks to this series of events, free registrations for the Dakar or automatic access to the selections for the following year's Dakar and other benefits are made available in view of participation in the final event of the season, reserved, in particular, for amateurs (as well as the debutants) best placed in the special ranking, in order to discover new talents.
