= Aidyn Rakhimbaev =

Kazakh businessman

- Айдын Жұмаділұлы Рақымбаев
- Born: September 20, 1972 (age 54); Kaznakovka village, Samara district, Semipalatinsk Oblast, KazSSR
- Citizenship: (Kazakhstan) Kazakh
- Occupation: Chairman of the Board of Directors BI Group
- Spouse: Anar Rakhimbayeva (Amanzholova)
- Children: 7 children
- Parents: Zhumadil Rakhimbaev (father); Kulyara Rakhimbayeva (mother)
- Website: company.bi.group

Aidyn Rakhimbaev (Kazakh: Aidyn Zhumadiuly Rakymbaev; born on September 20, 1972) is a Kazakhstani businessman, philanthropist. Shareholder and Chairman of the Board of Directors of the BI-Group holding. In 2022, he took 17th place in the list of the 50 richest businessmen of Kazakhstan (personal fortune is estimated at $510 million), 9th place in the list of the most influential businessmen of Kazakhstan.

== Biography ==
Aidyn Rakhimbaev was born in the village of Kaznakovka, Samara region, in the family of a machine operator. Parents - father Rakhimbaev Zhumadil, mother - Rakhimbaeva Kulyara. The family had two brothers and two sisters.

In 1990, Rakhimbaev entered the Tselinograd Civil Engineering Institute with a degree in civil engineering, where he studied until 1995. In 2002 he received a master's degree in law in the L. N. Gumilev Eurasian National University, and in 2007 - an MBA degree at the International Academy of Business. Since 2019, he has been studying the OPM program at Harvard Business School.

Aidyn Rakhimbaev's wife, Anar Rakhimbaeva, is a doctor by profession and is the head of the public fund "Mom's House" and the National Agency for Adoption. Together they raise seven children.

In 2020, Rakhimbaev said that he and his wife decided to take a child from an orphanage into the family. The plans were to take a girl of 4 years old, having come to the first meeting, the employees of the orphanage reported that this girl also has a brother and sister. It was decided that they would take three children into their family. This was the start for the opening of the National Adoption Agency.

== Business career ==
Rakhimbaev began his career as a laborer in a construction team. Entering the Tselinograd Civil Engineering Institute in the last year, together with fellow students, he founded the first business - the AzTek trading company (predecessor of BI Group). Since 1998, a construction division was opened in AzTek, then in 2001 the company completely refocused on housing construction and was named BI Group. In 2014, the holding was included in the list of Top 250 Global Contractors. Since the foundation of the company, Aidyn Rakhimbaev has been its leader. Since 2015, BI Group began working on construction projects in the oilfield services industry. Participated in the implementation of the TengizService future expansion project at Tengiz. The amount of contracts with Tengizchevroil is $360 million. BI Group is implementing a project with the international hotel chain Hilton to create and develop a chain of hotels under the Hampton by Hilton brand in Central Asia. Today the company is engaged in construction in Kazakhstan, Russia, Georgia, Kyrgyzstan and Uzbekistan. At the end of 2022, BI Group entered the list of 50 largest private companies of Forbes Kazakhstan magazine (5th place) with a turnover of 571 billion tenge.

== Hobbies ==
Aidyn Rakhimbaev has participated in different forms of motorsport and triathlon tournaments, such as the Ironman Triathlon in Barcelona.

He was the only Kazakhstani who entered the top 10 best riders at the end of the Dakar-2015 race (9th place in the overall SUV standings). He entered the top five of the strongest riders of the Silk Way Rally in 2016 (Moscow - Beijing) during the Dakar Series.

He was the first Kazakhstani who raised the flag of the country at the Ironman World Championship Kailua-Kona 2017, Hawaii.

== Philanthropy ==
Rakhimbaev was the initiator of the project "Mom's House", which provides assistance to women who find themselves in a difficult life situation. He was also the initiator of the IQanat educational project, which provides support to students in rural schools. IQanat holds an Olympiad among rural schoolchildren and prepares them for exams. Rakhimbaev, together with his wife Anar, founded the Aidyn & Anar Rakhimbayev Foundation to finance joint charitable projects.

== Awards ==
- Order "Kurmet" for merit and significant contribution to the construction of Nur-Sultan (Astana).
- Order of the "Barys" III degree.
