= Silk Way Rally =

Off-road vehicle race

- Category: Rally raid
- Region: Eurasia
- Inaugural season: 2009
- Drivers' champion: (Russia) Pavel Andreev (Cars) (Mongolia) Murun Purevdorj (Bikes) (Russia) Anton Shibalov (Trucks) (Russia) Alexey Zverev (Quads) (Turkmenistan) Merdan Toylyev (Production) (Russia) Dmitry Cherkesov (SSV)
- Constructors' champion: Toyota (Cars); KTM (Bikes); Kamaz (Trucks); Russian Mechanics (Quads); Nissan (Production); Can-Am (SSV)
- Official website: www.silkwayrally.com

The Silk Way Rally (Russian: Шёлковый путь) is an annual rally raid held in Russia and neighbouring countries. The first Silk Way Rally was run in 2009 from Kazan, Russia, to Ashgabat, Turkmenistan. It is organised by the Silk Way Rally Association.

The race is part of the Russian Rally-Raid Championship. From 2009 to 2011, it was on the ASO's Dakar Series, followed by being a FIA World Cup for Cross-Country Rallies round.

== Rules ==
Silk Way Rally is a rally raid that goes both through off-road spaces and by public roads. Each crew, which usually consists of a driver and a navigator (with a mechanic for truck crews and only of a rider for motorcycles), must complete the Selective Sections (also called Special Stages) of the itinerary indicated in the Road Book (the legend) and pass through all compulsory Waypoints. The crew with the shortest total time on all specials of rally route becomes the winner.

Road sections (or liaisons) between the specials go on public roads and highways and must be covered within the target time, observing Road Traffic Code. The failure to respect the target time incurs a penalty, which is marked on the control card (carnet) and is taken in account during the calculation of total results.

Since 2012 any competitor that fails to complete a special stage is allowed to continue the race with a penalty of 50 hours, added to the total time. This option can be used only one time and must be performed on the next day after the failed stage.

The rally compete in three categories: moto, cars and trucks. The motorcycle class was added in 2019. Along with the division into basic categories of moto, cars and trucks, each of them having its own overall classification, all vehicles that participate in Silk Way Rally are split into separate competition groups as required by FIA.

== Winners ==
Part of Dakar Series
Part of FIA and/or FIM competitions

Year	Route	Cars		Trucks		Bikes		Quads	
Year	Route	Driver Co-Driver	Make	Driver Co-Driver Mechanic	Make	Rider	Make	Rider	Make
2009	Kazan–Ashgabat	(Spain) Carlos Sainz (Spain) Lucas Cruz	Volkswagen Touareg	(Russia) Firdaus Kabirov (Russia) Andrey Mokeev (Russia) Tanin Anatoly	Kamaz	Not held		Not held	
2010	St. Petersburg–Sochi	(Spain) Carlos Sainz (Spain) Lucas Cruz	Volkswagen Touareg	(Russia) Eduard Nikolaev (Russia) Viatcheslav Mizyukaev (Russia) Vladimir Rybakov	Kamaz	Not held		Not held	
2011	Moscow–Sochi	(Poland) Krzysztof Hołowczyc (Belgium) Jean-Marc Fortin	BMW X3	(Czech Republic) Aleš Loprais (Czech Republic) Vojtěch Štajf (Czech Republic) Milan Holáň	Tatra	Not held		Not held	
2012	Moscow–Gelendzhik	(Russia) Boris Gadasin (Russia) Dan Schemel	G-Force Proto	(Russia) Ayrat Mardeev	Kamaz	Not held		Not held	
2013	Moscow–Astrakhan	(France) Jean-Louis Schlesser (Russia) Konstantin Zhiltsov	Sonangol Schlesser Original	(Russia) Dmitry Sotnikov (Russia) Viatcheslav Mizyukaev (Russia) Andrei Aferin	Kamaz	Not held		Not held	
2014–2015	not held					Not held		Not held	
2016	Moscow–Beijing	(France) Cyril Despres (France) David Castera	Peugeot 2008 DKR	(Russia) Ayrat Mardeev (Russia) Aydar Belyaev (Russia) Dmitriy Svistunov	Kamaz	Not held		Not held	
2017	Moscow–Xi'an	(France) Cyril Despres (France) David Castera	Peugeot 3008 DKR	(Russia) Dmitry Sotnikov (Russia) Ruslan Akhmadeev (Russia) Ilnur Mustafin	Kamaz	Not held		Not held	
2018	Astrakhan–Moscow	(Saudi Arabia) Yazeed Al Rajhi (Germany) Timo Gottschalk	Mini John Cooper Works Rally	(Russia) Andrey Karginov (Russia) Andrey Mokeev (Russia) Igor Leonov	Kamaz	Not held		Not held	
2019	Irkutsk–Dunhuang	(Qatar) Nasser Al-Attiyah (France) Mathieu Baumel	Toyota Hilux	(Russia) Anton Shibalov (Russia) Dmitry Nikitin (Russia) Ivan Tatarinov	Kamaz	(United Kingdom) Sam Sunderland	KTM 450 Rally Factory	(Poland) Rafał Sonik	Yamaha Raptor 700
2020	not held								
2021	Omsk–Gorno-Altaysk	(France) Guerlain Chicherit (France) Alexandre Winocq	Century Racing CR6	(Russia) Dmitry Sotnikov (Russia) Ruslan Akhmadeev (Russia) Ilgiz Akhmetzianov	Kamaz	(Austria) Matthias Walkner	KTM 450 Rally Factory Replica	(Russia) Alexander Maximov	Yamaha YFM 700R Raptor SE
2022	Astrakhan–Moscow	(Russia) Alexander Rusanov (Russia) Evgeny Pavlov	GAZelle NEXT	(Russia) Dmitry Sotnikov (Russia) Ruslan Akhmadeev	Kamaz	(Russia) Alexey Naumov	KTM 450 Rally Factory Replica	(Russia) Dmitry Kalinin	Can-Am Outlander
2023	Kazan–Moscow	(Russia) Andrey Rudskoy (Russia) Dmitry Karpov	G-Force Bars	(Belarus) Siarhei Viazovich (Belarus) Pavel Haranin (Belarus) Andrei Krahelskiy	MAZ	(Russia) Ilya Scheglov	Husqvarna	(Russia) Anatoly Kuznetsov	Can-Am
2024	Tomsk–Ulaanbaatar	(Russia) Aleksandr Semenov (Russia) Dmitrii Okhotnikov	GAZ	(Russia) Dmitry Sotnikov (Russia) Ruslan Akhmadeev (Russia) Ilgiz Akhmetzianov	Kamaz	(Russia) Alexey Naumov	Husqvarna	(Russia) Danil Loginov	Can-Am
2025	Irkutsk–Gorno-Altaysk	(Russia) Pavel Andreev (Russia) Gleb Mokeev	Toyota	(Russia) (Russia) Anton Shibalov (Russia) Alexander Kupriyanov (Russia) Daniil Telepov	Kamaz	(Mongolia) Murun Purevdorj	KTM	(Russia) Alexey Zverev	Russian Mechanics

== History ==
=== Summary ===
Year	Start		Finish		# Stage	Distance, km		
Year	Date	City	Date	City	# Stage	Special Stage	Liaison	Total
2009	5 September	(Russia) Kazan	13 September	(Turkmenistan) Ashgabat	9	2,621	2,007	4,628
2010	11 September	(Russia) Saint-Petersburg	18 September	(Russia) Sochi	8	2,014	2,845	4,859
2011	10 July	(Russia) Moscow	16 July	(Russia) Sochi	7	2,450	1,490	3,940
2012	7 July	(Russia) Moscow	13 July	(Russia) Gelendzhik	7	2,083	1,776	3,859
2013	7 July	(Russia) Moscow	13 July	(Russia) Astrakhan	8	2, 822	1173	3,995
2016	9 July	(Russia) Moscow	24 July	(China) Beijing	15	4,105	6,630	10,735
2017	7 July	(Russia) Moscow	22 July	(China) Xi'an	14	4,094	5,50	9,599
2018	15 July	(Russia) Astrakhan	29 July	(Russia) Moscow	7	2,327	873	3,488
2019	6 July	(Russia) Irkutsk	16 July	(China) Dunhuang	10	2,589	2,414	5,003
2020	not held							
2021	1 July	(Russia) Omsk	6 July	(Russia) Gorno-Altaysk	5	651	2,457	3,108
2022	6 July	(Russia) Astrakhan	16 July	(Russia) Moscow	10	2,800	1,580	4,380
2023	5 July	(Russia) Kazan	15 July	(Russia) Moscow	9	2,350	3,800	5,230
2024	5 July	(Russia) Tomsk	15 July	(Mongolia) Ulaanbaatar	11	2,992	2,250	5,243
2025	10 July	(Russia) Irkutsk	23 July	(Russia) Gorno-Altaysk	11	2,402	2,409	4,811
Note: the data are listed nominally - due to cancellations, abbreviations and changes in the stages may actually differ.

=== 2009 ===
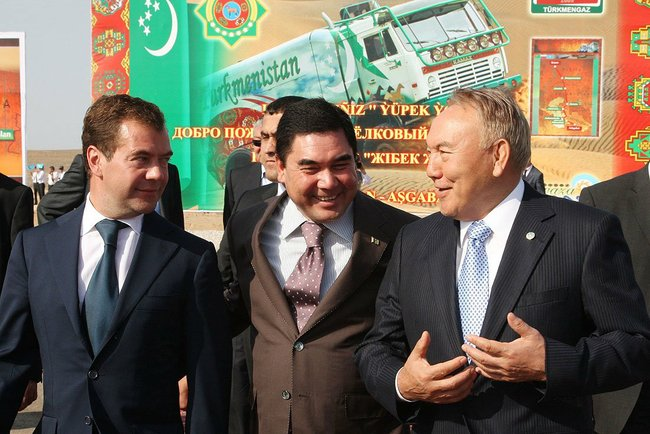
Presidents of the host at the solemn event after the first edition of the rally on 13 September 2009 (from left to right): Dmitry Medvedev, Gurbanguly Berdimuhamedow and Nursultan Nazarbayev

Edition 1 of the Silk Way Rally set off from Kazan in Tatarstan and headed to Ashgabat in Turkmenistan. The nine days, 4,500-km rally featured 3,900 km of special stages. Carlos Sainz won his 1st international Rally-Raid. A perfect rehearsal for "El Matador" who the following January won the Dakar Rally in his 4th attempt. In the truck category, Kamaz dominated with two-time Dakar winner Firdaus Kabirov taking top honours in what was his last major international victory.

Stage	Date	Start	Finish	Distance, km		
Stage	Date	Start	Finish	SS	Liaison	Total
Prologue	5/09	(Russia) Kazan	(Russia) Kazan	2	-	2
1	6/09	(Russia) Kazan	(Russia) Buguruslan	141	337	478
2	7/09	(Russia) Buguruslan	(Kazakhstan) Uralsk	231	316	547
3	8/09	(Kazakhstan) Uralsk	(Kazakhstan) Beyneu	580	296	876
4	9/09	(Kazakhstan) Beyneu	(Kazakhstan) Zhanaozen	424	55	479
5	10/09	(Kazakhstan) Zhanaozen	(Turkmenistan) Türkmenbaşy	514	184	698
6	11/09	(Turkmenistan) Türkmenbaşy	(Turkmenistan) Balkanabad	345	72	417
7	12/09	(Turkmenistan) Balkanabad	(Turkmenistan) Türkmenbaşy	360	154	514
8	13/09	(Turkmenistan) Türkmenbaşy	(Turkmenistan) Asgabat	24	593	617
Total				2 621	2 007	4 628
Note: Green color is allocated distances, cream — not included.

- Participating countries - 25
- Total route length - 4628 km
- 62 cars and 20 trucks entered the marathon
- 34 cars and 16 trucks finished the marathon
- 113 media accredited - 347 journalists
- 753 TV broadcasts with total duration of 2,260 minutes
- 3,167 publications in media
- Team service cars - 96 crews
- 17 crews presented the raid category
- 60 т of petrol, 210 т of diesel fuel and 325 т of aviation kerosine were used
- Escort provided support to 160 vehicles of participants and 120 vehicles of
- Organization committee: 526 VIPs from four states visited the rally

=== 2010 ===
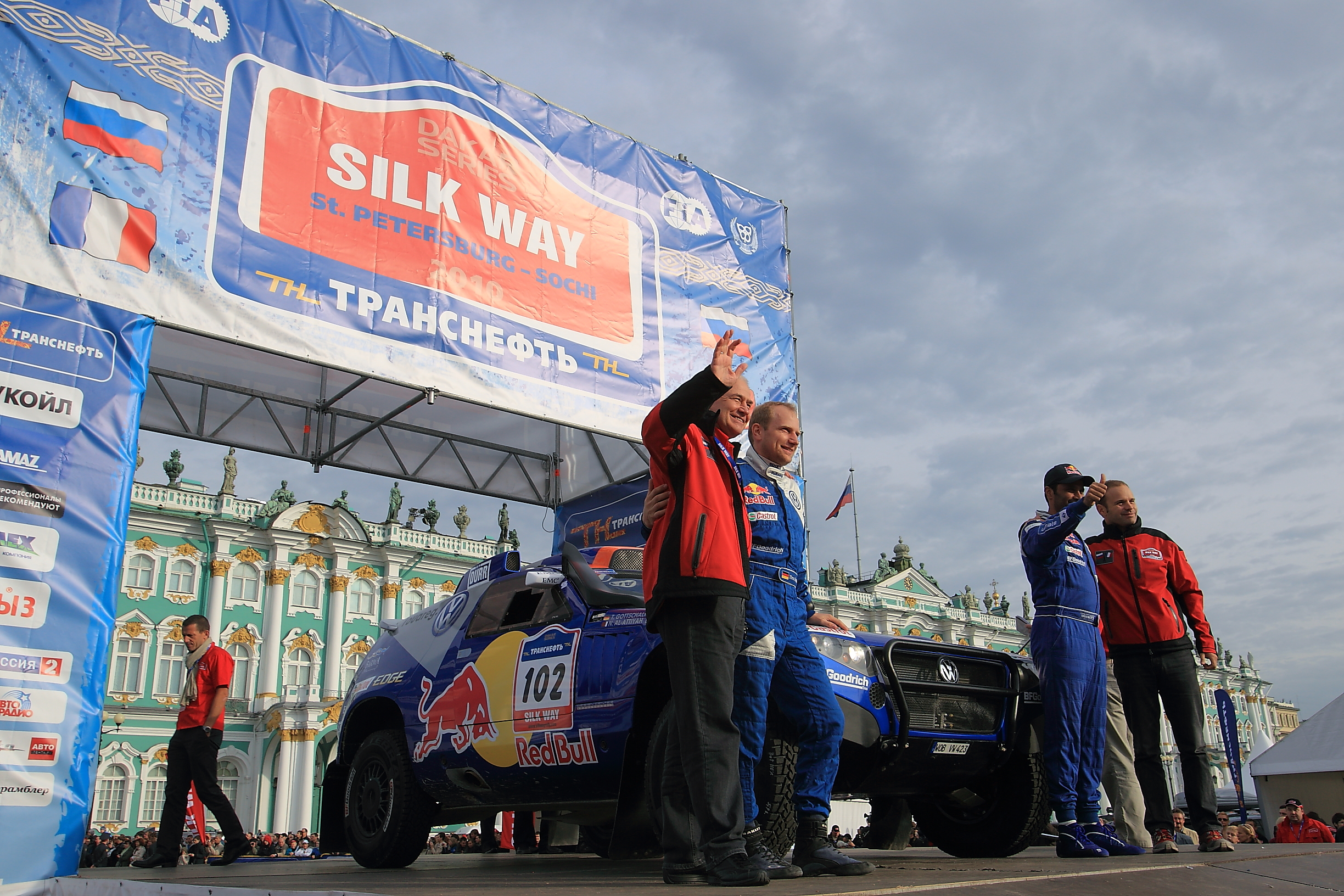
Start ceremony of the rally-marathon "Silk Way 2010" from the Palace Square in St. Petersburg, Russia

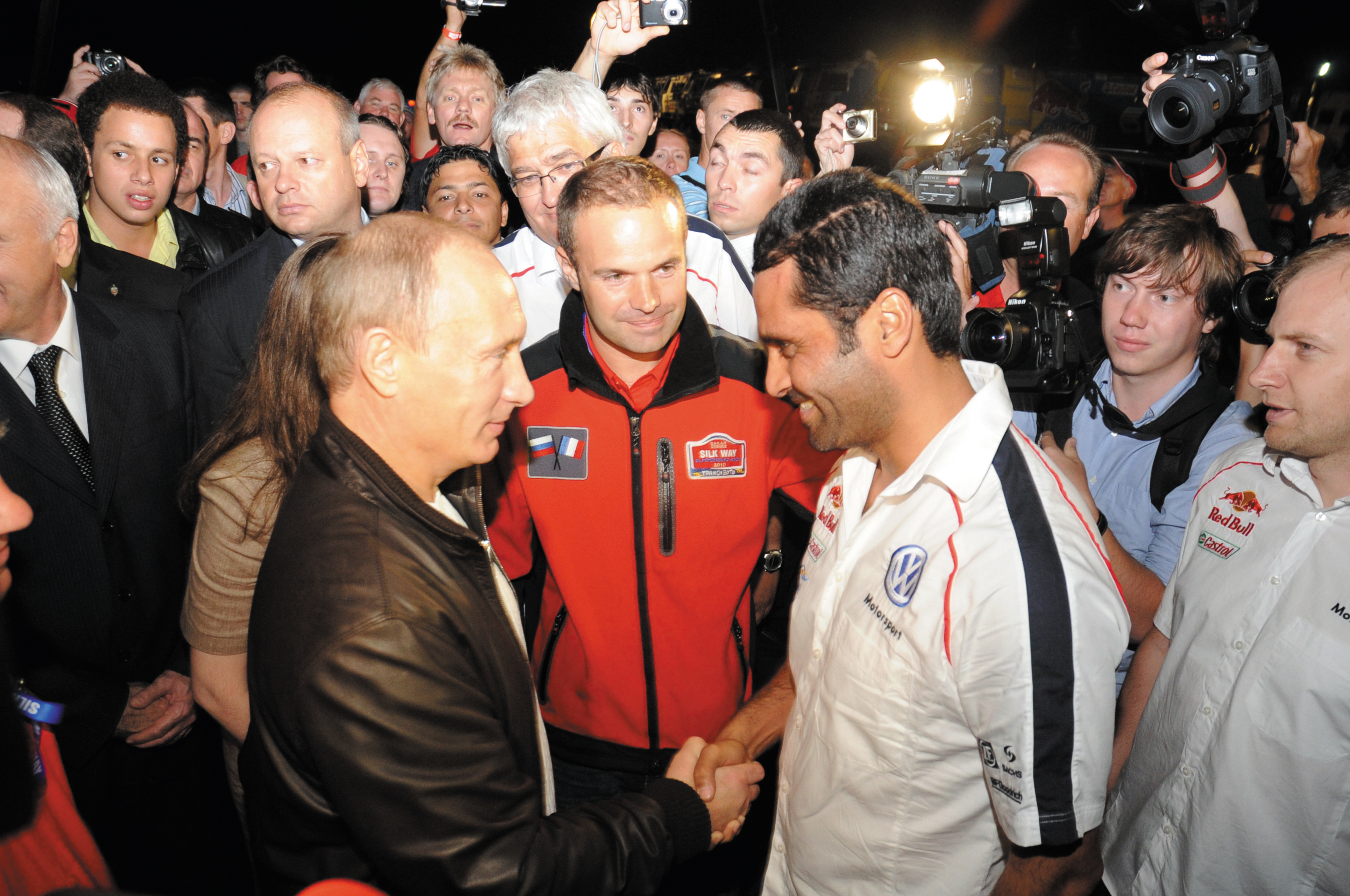
Vladimir Putin on the bivouac of the rally-marathon "Silk Way" meets with the participants of the competition

Stage	Date	Start	Finish	Distance, km		
Stage	Date	Start	Finish	SS	Liaison	Total
1	11/09	(Russia) Saint-Petersburg	(Russia) Staraya Russa	85	330	415
2	12/09	(Russia) Staraya Russa	(Russia) Vyazma	209	575	770
3	13/09	(Russia) Vyazma	(Russia) Lipetsk	210	395	605
4	14/09	(Russia) Lipetsk	(Russia) Volgograd	300	490	790
5	15/09	(Russia) Volgograd	(Russia) Astrakhan	450	150	600
6	16/09	(Russia) Astrakhan	(Russia) Elista	400	105	505
7	17/09	(Russia) Elista	(Russia) Maykop	340	440	780
8	18/09	(Russia) Maykop	(Russia) Krasnaya Polyana	20	360	380
Total				2 014	2 845	4 859

- Participating countries - 22
- Total route length - 4859 km
- 48 cars and 16 trucks entered the marathon
- 29 cars and 13 trucks finished the marathon
- 168 media accredited - 507 journalists
- 918 TV broadcasts with total duration of 3,660 minutes
- 4,015 publications in media
- Team service cars - 96 crews
- 12 crews in cars and motorbikes presented the raid category
- 51,675 L of petrol, 289,912 L of diesel fuel and 160 ton of aviation kerosine were used

=== 2011 ===
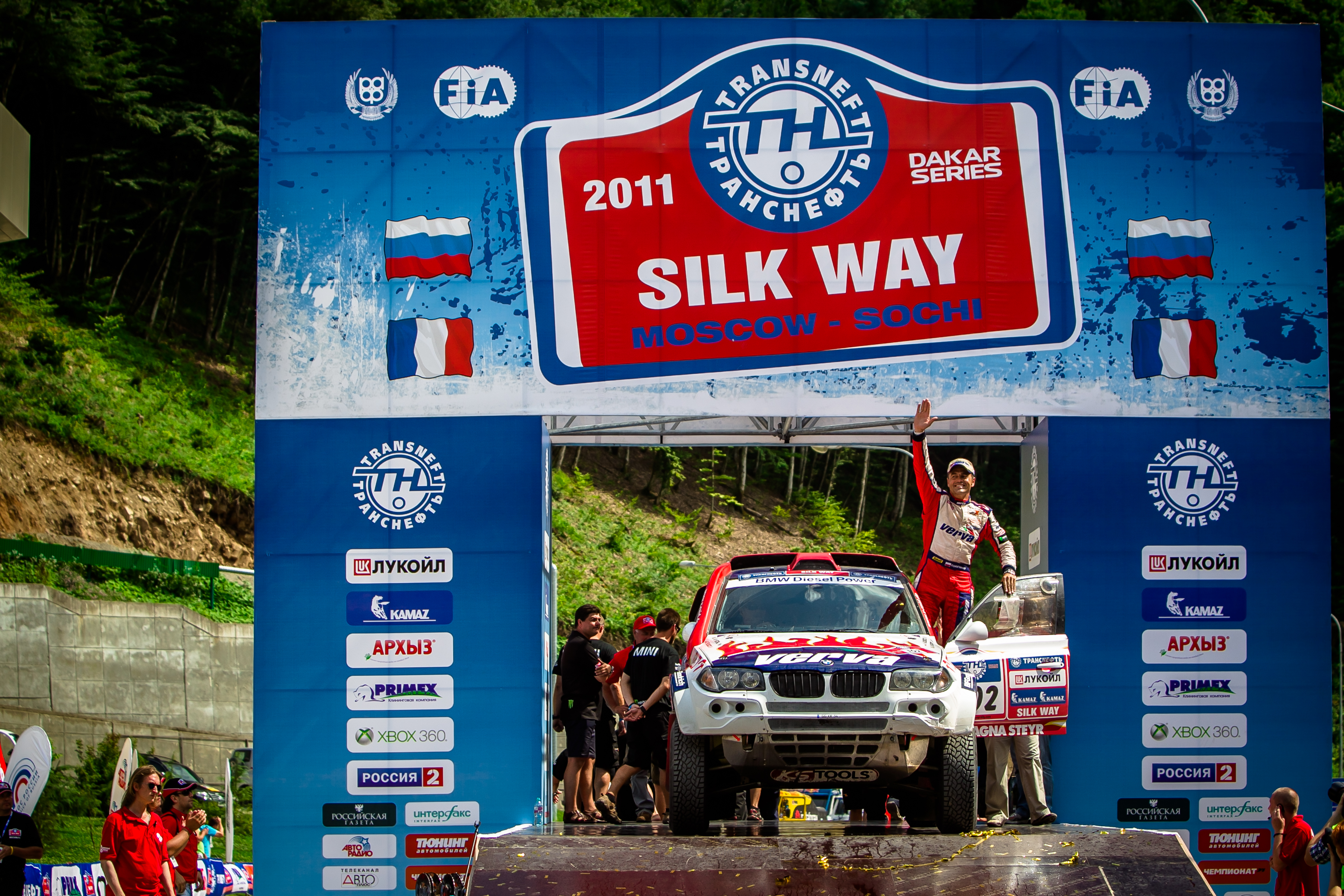
Polish pilot Krzysztof Hołowczyc on the podium of the rally-marathon "Silk Way Rally 2011", Krasnaya polyana

First departure from Moscow for the Silk Way Rally, which saw its number of entries rise, to the delight of the thousands of Muscovites who came to Red Square for the ceremonial start. Ahead of the competitors, seven days of racing and 3,983 km, with 2,366 km of special stages. After the week of hard-fought action it was Poland's Krzysztof Holowczyc scoring the biggest win of his career, ahead of the disciplines greatest driver, Stéphane Peterhansel, while in the truck category, Alès Loprais got revenge from the previous year.

Stage	Date	Start	Finish	Distance, km		
Stage	Date	Start	Finish	SS	Liaison	Total
1	10/07	(Russia) Moscow	(Russia) Lipetsk	260	310	570
2	11/07	(Russia) Lipetsk	(Russia) Volgograd	480	365	845
3	12/07	(Russia) Volgograd	(Russia) Astrakhan	430	160	590
4	13/07	(Russia) Astrakhan	(Russia) Astrakhan	400	15	415
5	14/07	(Russia) Astrakhan	(Russia) Stavropol	690	75	765
6	15/07	(Russia) Stavropol	(Russia) Maykop	170	220	390
7	16/07	(Russia) Maykop	(Russia) Sochi	20	345	365
Total				2 450	1 490	3 940
Note: green color marked distances included in the overall standings , cream — distance not included in the overall standings.

- Participating countries - 28
- Total route length – 3,940 km
- 95 cars and 35 trucks entered the marathon
- 50 cars and 26 trucks finished the marathon
- 138 media accredited - 605 journalists
- 969 TV broadcasts with total duration of 3,983 minutes
- 4,518 publications in media
- Team service cars - 153 crews
- 50,000 L of petrol, 551,700 L of diesel fuel and 160 ton of aviation kerosine were used

=== 2012 ===
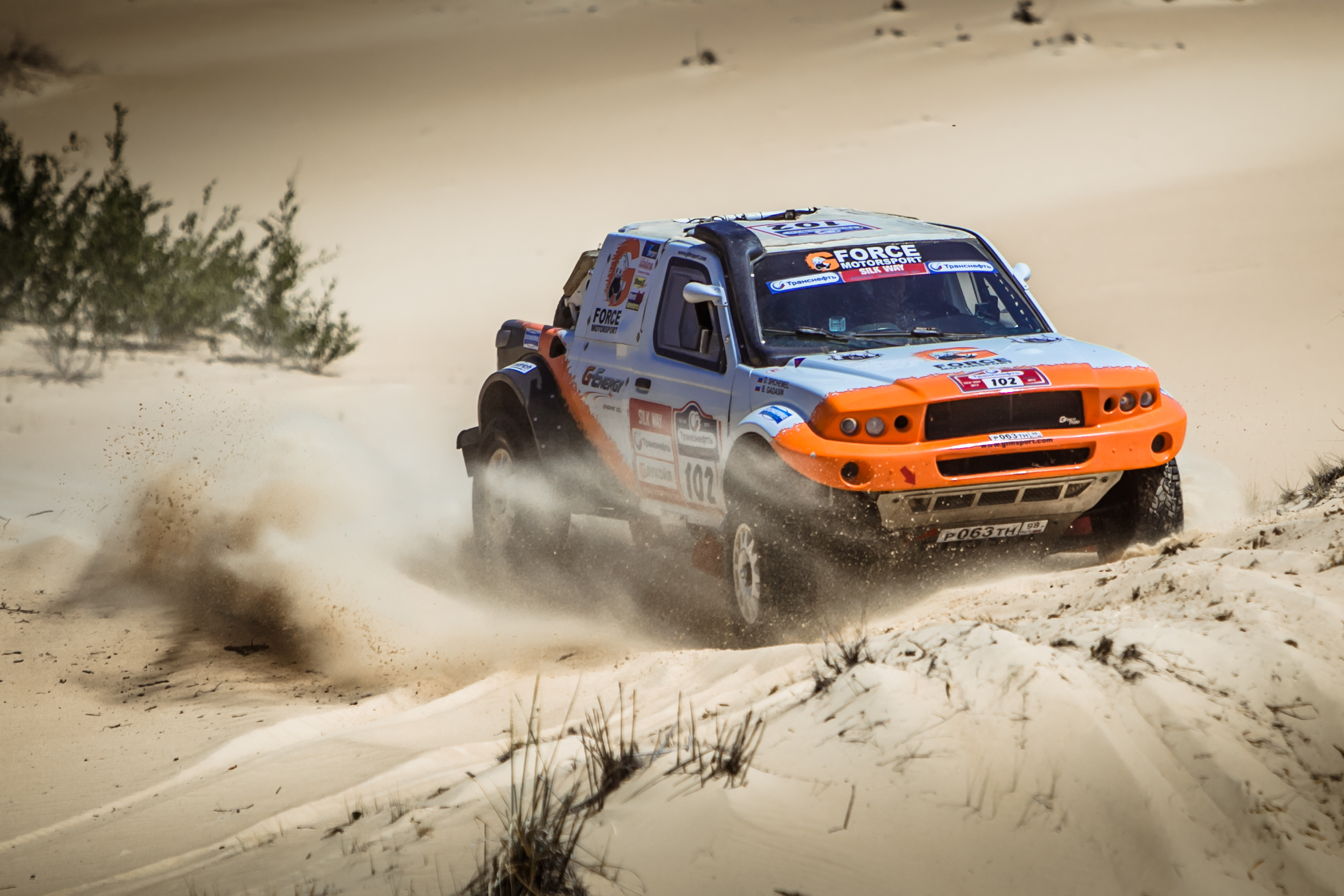
Winner of the Silk Way Rally 2012 Boris Gadasin

The start once again from Red Square for the Silk Way Rally, which the number of entries is on the rise. On the programme, a completely new 4,000-km route to Sochi. Storms that battered southern Russian forced the race to stop at Gelendzhik. Boris Gadasin became the first Russian driver to win in the car category, while Kamaz returned to its winning ways thanks to another of its young hopefuls, Ayrat Mardeev, the future winner of the 2015 Dakar!

Stage	Date	Start	Finish	Distance, km		
Stage	Date	Start	Finish	SS	Liaison	Total
Prologue	7/07	(Russia) Moscow	(Russia) Ryazan	-	184,85	184,85
1	8/07	(Russia) Ryazan	(Russia) Volgograd	258	620	878
2	9/07	(Russia) Volgograd	(Russia) Volgograd	309	125	434
3	10/07	(Russia) Volgograd	(Russia) Elista	488	189	677
4	11/07	(Russia) Elista	(Russia) Elista	506	159,5	665,5
5	12/07	(Russia) Elista	(Russia) Maykop	453	230	683
6	13/07	(Russia) Maykop	(Russia) Gelendzhik	69	266	335
Total				2 083	1 774	3 857
Note: Green color is allocated distances, cream — not included.

- Participating countries - 25
- Total route length – 3,550 km
- 118 crews: 93 jeeps and 25 trucks entered the marathon
- Team service cars - 143 crews
- 270 media accredited - 581 journalists
- 712 TV broadcasts with total duration of 2,074 minutes
- 4,312 publications in media
- 360,000 L of motor fuel are used

=== 2013 ===
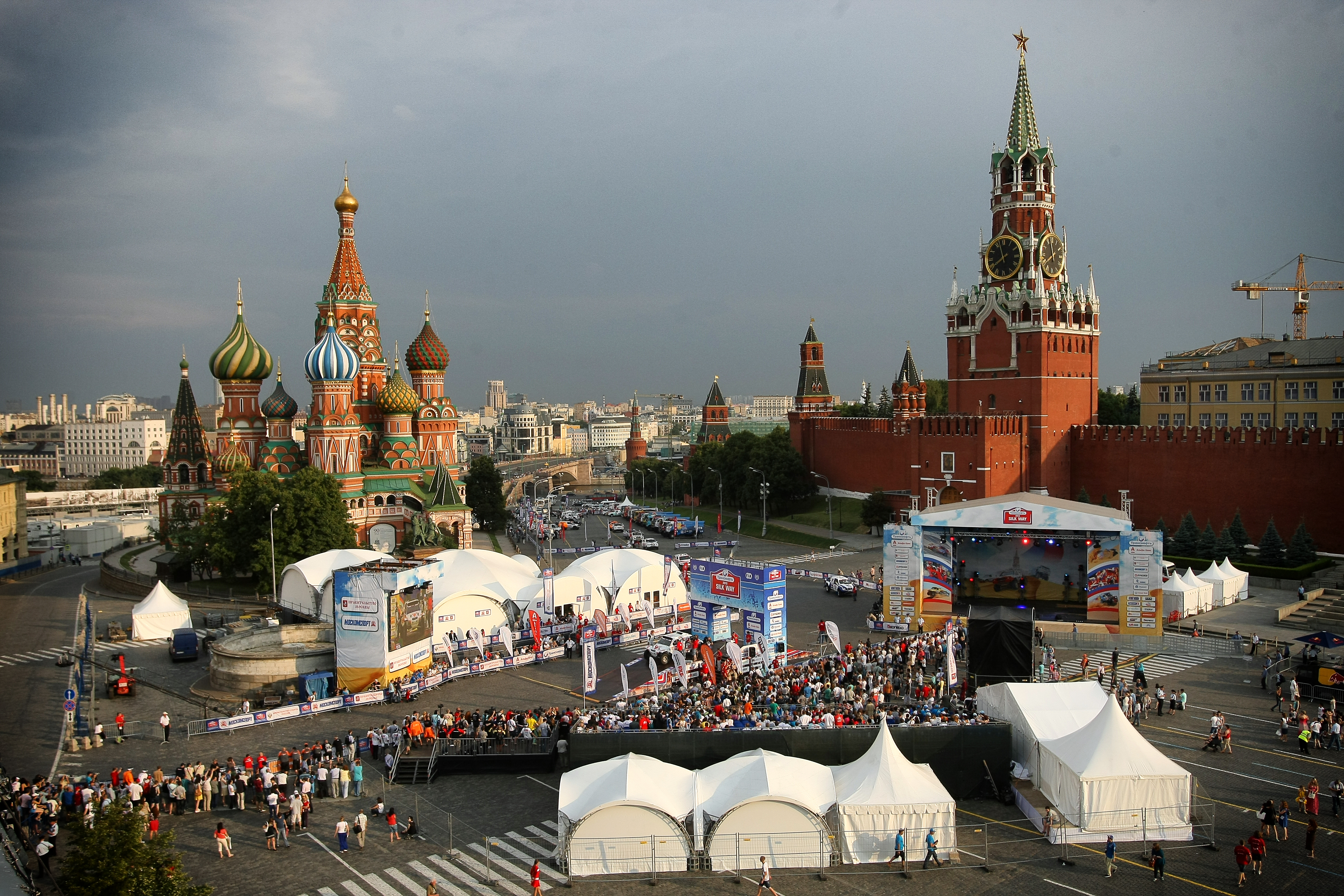
Start of the rally-marathon "Silk Way Rally 2013" on Red Square in Moscow

Stage	Date	Start	Finish	Distance, km		
Stage	Date	Start	Finish	SS	Liaison	Total
Prologue	6/07	(Russia) Moscow	(Russia) Tambov	-	452,91	452,91
1	7/07	(Russia) Tambov	(Russia) Volgograd	373,43	370,69	744,12
2	8/07	(Russia) Volgograd	(Russia) Volgograd	478,38	68,39	546,77
3	9/07	(Russia) Volgograd	(Russia) Astrakhan	485,74	144,29	631,03
4	10/07	(Russia) Elista	(Russia) Astrakhan	485,00	49,67	534,67
5	11/07	(Russia) Astrakhan	(Russia) Astrakhan	499,00	60,25	559,25
6	12/07	(Russia) Astrakhan	(Russia) Astrakhan	512,00	54,02	466,02
7	13/07	(Russia) Astrakhan	(Russia) Astrakhan	87,36	74,65	162,01
Total				2 822	1 275	4097

=== 2016 ===
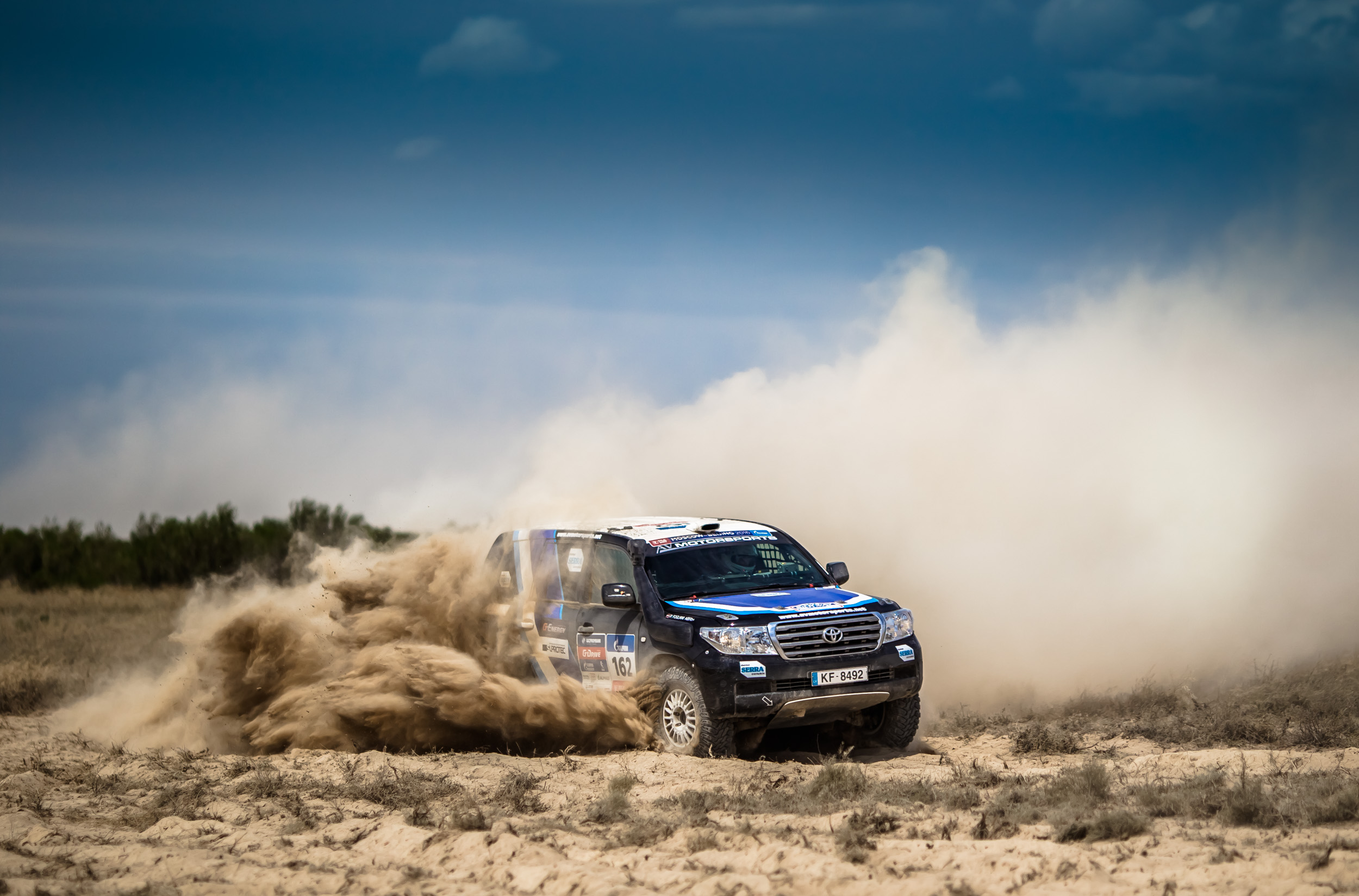
Production group car on the stage of the Silk Way Rally 2016

Stage	Date	Start	Finish	Altitude, m		Distance, km		
Stage	Date	Start	Finish	Min.	Max.	SS	Liaison	Total
1	9/07	(Russia) Moscow	(Russia) Kazan			2	852	854
2	10/07	(Russia) Kazan	(Russia) Ufa	64	188	136	490	625
3	11/07	(Russia) Ufa	(Kazakhstan) Kostanay	254	467	200	615	815
4	12/07	(Kazakhstan) Kostanay	(Kazakhstan) Astana	108	378	345	510	856
5	13/07	(Kazakhstan) Astana	(Kazakhstan) Balkhash	408	998	569	253	821
6	14/07	(Kazakhstan) Balkhash	(Kazakhstan) Almaty	336	580	411	445	856
7	16/07	(Kazakhstan) Almaty	(China) Bortala	1072	2575	77	505	582
8	17/07	(China) Bortala	(China) Urumqi	294	471	257	648	905
9	18/07	(China) Urumqi	(China) Hami	58	974	384	335	720
10	19/07	(China) Hami	(China) Dunhuang	553	1916	340	144	484
11	20/07	(China) Dunhuang	(China) Jiayuguan	1376	2508	330	231	561
12	21/07	(China) Jiayuguan	(China) Alashan	1148	1811	425	242	667
13	22/07	(China) Alashan	(China) Wuhai	1159	1792	367	357	725
14	23/07	(China) Wuhai	(China) Hohhot	1039	1224	261	494	756
15	24/07	(China) Hohhot	(China) Beijing			-	508	508
Total						4 105	6 630	10 735
Note: the distances included in the overall standings are highlighted in green , cream is canceled. The actual numbers may differ from the sum of the intermediate numbers, since all the numbers are rounded.

- 10735 km - total route length
- 17 days - rally duration, 14 bivouacs
- 41 countries presented their participants
- 1,100 participants and team members
- More than 2,500 people in Europe, Russia and China in the Rally organization
- 145 Russian and international journalists received permanent accreditation
- 560 media representatives received temporary accreditation
- TV reports from the "Silk Way 2016" Rally were broadcast in 196 countries of Europe, North and South America, Asia and Africa
- Bivouac hosted up to 2,200 people daily
- 550 vehicles arrived daily to the bivouac and went further along the rally route
- 125 sports crews (102 SUVs and 23 trucks) entered the rally
- 192 "Assistance" crews
- Up to 15,000 people visited the spectator areas along the rally route every day
- 16 aircraft
- 14 auto transporters moved along the rally route

=== 2017 ===
For the Silk Way Rally of year 2017 the Organization Committee prepared a new route project, which includes the best features of the 6th edition as well as some developments and surprises. The rally once again took the form of a marathon through Russia, Kazakhstan and China, which proved itself successful last year. The rally's organisation was commended by the Russian President Vladimir Putin.

Stage	Date	Start	Finish	Distance, km		
Stage	Date	Start	Finish	SS	Liaison	Total
1	8/07	(Russia) Moscow	(Russia) Cheboksary	61,43	665,72	726,95
2	9/07	(Russia) Cheboksary	(Russia) Ufa	157,00	628,63	785,63
3	10/07	(Russia) Ufa	(Kazakhstan) Kostanay	329,25	567,14	876,39
4	11/07	(Kazakhstan) Kostanay	(Kazakhstan) Astana	373,22	192,69	908,80
5	12/07	(Kazakhstan) Astana	(Kazakhstan) Semey	484,47	365,07	849,54
6	13/07	(Kazakhstan) Semey	(Kazakhstan) Urdzhar	387,86	209,27	597,13
7	14/07	(Kazakhstan) Urdzhar	(China) Karamay	106,60	306,3	412,90
8	15/07	(China) Karamay	(China) Urumqi	250,37	185,97	436,34
9	17/07	(China) Urumqi	(China) Hami	421,00	392,89	813,89
10	18/07	(China) Hami	(China) Dunhuang	360,28	157,25	517,53
11	19/07	(China) Dunhuang	(China) Jiayuguan	488,65	208,85	783,84
12	20/07	(China) Jiayuguan	(China) Alashan	254,75	229,04	483,79
13	21/07	(China) Alashan	(China) Zhongwei	318,66	236,48	690,31
14	22/07	(China) Zhongwei	(China) Xi'an	100,67	643,76	716,56
Total				4 094	5 505	9 599
Note: the distances included in the overall standings are highlighted in green , cream is canceled. The actual numbers may differ from the sum of the intermediate numbers, since all the numbers are rounded

=== 2018 ===
• The distance of the route of the Silk Way Rally 2018 (Russian part) - 5169 km, 3127 are special stages

• 94 crews took part

• Permanently accredited media - 214

• TV channels - 85

• 196 broadcast countries

• 3,500 people took rally bivouacs daily

• Up to 20,000 people were in spectator areas daily

• 13 aircraft of aviation support (6 aircraft, 7 helicopters)

Stage	Date	Start	Finish	Distance, km		
Stage	Date	Start	Finish	SS	Liaison	Total
1	21/07	(Russia) Astrakhan	(Russia) Astrakhan	311	36.97	347.97
2	22/07	(Russia) Astrakhan	(Russia) Elista	365.50	107.10	472.60
3	23/07	(Russia) Elista	(Russia) Astrakhan	332	143.38	475.38
4	24/07	(Russia) Astrakhan	(Russia) Astrakhan	366.03	24.55	390.58
5	25/07	(Russia) Astrakhan	(Russia) Volgograd	443.78	94.10	537.88
6	26/07	(Russia) Volgograd	(Russia) Lipetsk	317.15	449.63	766.78
7	27/07	(Russia) Lipetsk	(Russia) Moscow	191.70	305.52	497.22
Total				2,327	1,160	3,488

=== 2019 ===
On 6 July 2019 the Rally officially took off from Irkutsk.

Stage	Date	Start	Finish	Distance, km		
Stage	Date	Start	Finish	SS	Liaison	Total
1	7/07	(Russia) Irkutsk	(Russia) Baikalsk	50.87	204.03	254.90
2	8/07	(Russia) Baikalsk	(Russia) Ulan-Ude	207.67	201.67	409.34
3	9/07	(Russia) Ulan-Ude	(Mongolia) Ulaanbaatar	243	448.35	691.35
4	10/07	(Mongolia) Ulaanbaatar	(Mongolia) Ulaanbaatar	470.19	6.77	476.96
5	11/07	(Mongolia) Ulaanbaatar	(Mongolia) Mandalgovi	337	27.59	364.59
6	12/07	(Mongolia) Mandalgovi	(Mongolia) Dalanzadgad	408.17	3.58	411.75
7	13/07	(Mongolia) Dalanzadgad	(China) Bayinbaolige	-	551	551
8	14/07	(China) Bayinbaolige	(China) Alashan	326.60	459.51	786.11
9	15/07	(China) Alashan	(China) Jiayuguan	290.30	210.90	501.20
10	16/07	(China) Jiayuguan	(China) Dunhuang	255	301.30	556.30
Total				2,589	2,414	5,003

=== 2020 ===
The 2020 Silk Way Rally was cancelled due to the COVID-19 pandemic.

=== 2021 ===
The 2021 Silk Way Rally was held but the Mongolian portion was cancelled due to COVID-19 and bubonic plague outbreaks in the country.

=== 2022 ===
The 2022 race was held in July solely in Russia and had limited overseas entrants due to sanctions imposed on the country relating to the Russian invasion of Ukraine. Luc Alphand, who was appointed SWR sports director in 2021, departed his post following the invasion.

=== 2023 ===
Like in 2022, the ongoing Russo-Ukrainian War meant foreign participants were limited to those from nearby and friendly countries like Belarus, China, and Turkmenistan.

=== 2024 ===
The race returned to a multinational event in 2024 with the return of Mongolia. China was originally included on the route as the final stretch, concluding in Khorgos, but was dropped as the region wanted to wait until it returned to pre-COVID-19 economic activity.

In March, the Silk Way Rally Association partnered with Turkmenistan's sport committee to organise a rally raid in the country. The Turkmenistan Rally-Raid Championship debuted later that year.

=== 2025 ===
The 15th edition of the Silk Way Rally ran from 10 to 23 July 2025, from Irkutsk through Ulaanbaatar to Gorno-Altaysk, covering 4,811 km across Russia and Mongolia.

The event was held across 2 countries (Russia and Mongolia), with participants from 15 nations, 101 entered crews totalling 905 people travelling in the rally caravan. The route spanned 4,811.6 km, including 2,402.3 km of special stages, with 179 accredited media representatives.

Key sporting highlights:

- First victory by a truck on alternative fuel: Anton Shibalov (KAMAZ-master) triumphed on a gas-diesel KAMAZ after Sergey Vyazovich's (MAZ-SPORTavto) rollover and Eduard Nikolaev's speeding penalty.
- T3 (side-by-sides) competition: Dmitry Cherkesov won overall and class, with brother Aleksey 1:36 behind; Roman Rusinov dropped to third after a last-stage wheel change, trailing by just 1:48 despite favorites like Sergey Karyakin and Anastasia Nifontova retiring early.
- First motorcycle win by a Mongolian rider: Murun Purevdorj prevailed ahead of Ilya Shcheglov (who fell and needed evacuation but finished second) and Nail Khubbatullin.

=== 2026 ===
The 2026 race was cancelled due to a lack of funding.

== Political activity ==
The Silk Way Rally has been described by Western investigative journalists as a front for the GRU to help push Russia's geopolitical agenda.

In 2023, a joint investigation between Bellingcat, Der Spiegel, Le Monde, and The Insider uncovered internal Silk Way Rally Association documents that expressed plans to use the race to push Russian soft power in Eurasia. This was to culminate in a large route for the 2022 race that ran from Doha, Qatar, to Damascus, Syria, while also passing major cities in countries like Afghanistan, China, and Turkey. The association's director Bulat Yanborisov was also exposed as a GRU agent who frequently communicated with members of GRU Unit 29155 and received medals from agency head Vladimir Alekseyev. Yanborisov denied his connections to the GRU but acknowledged the rally has diplomatic importance.

Various GRU agents have been found to be working with the SWRA to faciltiate movement between countries, with Yanborisov housing its personnel in his estates across Europe. A 2024 investigation by Der Spiegel, The Insider, and 60 Minutes into Unit 29155's ties to Havana syndrome noted Alexander Mishkin, who was involved in the poisoning of Sergei and Yulia Skripal, disguised himself as a mechanic to travel to China with the 2016 and 2017 rallies.

In June 2024, the United States Department of the Treasury imposed sanctions on the Silk Way Rally Association, Yanborisov, and his son Amir. The department described the association as a "Russian intelligence procurement network" that utilised the race's "logistical infrastructure to procure anti-UAV and radioelectronic warfare equipment for use on the battlefield in Ukraine."

== Podium ==
=== Cars ===
Year	1st		2nd		3rd	
Year	Driver	Car	Driver	Car	Driver	Car
2009	(Spain) Carlos Sainz	Volkswagen	(United States) Mark Miller	Volkswagen	(South Africa) Giniel de Villiers	Volkswagen
2010	(Spain) Carlos Sainz	Volkswagen	(Qatar) Nasser Al-Attiyah	Volkswagen	(United States) Mark Miller	Volkswagen
2011	(Poland) Krzysztof Hołowczyc	BMW	(France) Stéphane Peterhansel	MINI	(Russia) Alexander Zheludov	Nissan
2012	(Russia) Boris Gadasin	G-Force	(Hungary) Balázs Szalay	Opel	(Czech Republic) Miroslav Zapletal	Hummer
2013	(France) Jean-Louis Schlesser	Sonangol Schlesser	(Russia) Vladimir Vasiliev	G-Force	(Russia) Evgeny Firsov	Toyota
2016	(France) Cyril Despres	Peugeot	(Saudi Arabia) Yazeed Al-Rajhi	MINI	(Russia) Vladimir Vasiliev	MINI
2017	(France) Cyril Despres	Peugeot	(France) Christian Lavieille	BAICmotor	(China) Wei Han	Geely
2018	(Saudi Arabia) Yazeed Al-Rajhi	MINI	(Qatar) Nasser Al-Attiyah	Toyota	(France) Cyril Despres	MCM Origina
2019	(Qatar) Nasser Al-Attiyah	Toyota	(China) Wei Han	Geely	(France) Jérôme Pelichet	OPTIMUS
2021	(France) Guerlain Chicherit	Century Racing	(Russia) Denis Krotov	MINI	(France) Jérôme Pelichet	MD Optimus
2022	(Russia) Denis Krotov	MINI	(Russia) Alexander Rusanov	GAZ	(Russia) Evgeny Sukhovenko	GAZ
2023	(Russia) Andrey Rudskoy	G-Force Bars				
2024	(Russia) Aleksandr Semenov	GAZ	(Russia) Aleksei Ignatov	GAZ	(France) Andrey Rudskoy	G-Force Bars
2025	(Russia) Pavel Andreev	Toyota	(Russia) Andrey Rudskoy	G-Force Bars	(Russia) Aleksei Ignatov	GAZ

=== Trucks ===
Year	1st		2nd		3rd	
Year	Crew	Truck	Crew	Truck	Crew	Truck
2009	(Russia) Firdaus Kabirov (Russia) Andrey Mokeev (Russia) Anatoly Tanin	Kamaz	(Netherlands) Gerard de Rooy (Belgium) Tom Colsoul (Poland) Darek Rodewald	Iveco	(Czech Republic) Ales Loprais (Slovakia) Jaroslav Miskolci (Czech Republic) Milan Holáň	Tatra
2010	(Russia) Eduard Nikolaev (Russia) Viatcheslav Mizyukaev (Russia) Vladimir Rybakov	Kamaz	(Russia) Vladimir Chagin (Russia) Sergey Savostin (Russia) Ildar Saysultanov	Kamaz	(Russia) Firdaus Kabirov (Russia) Aydar Belyaev (Russia) Andrey Mokeev	Kamaz
2011	(Czech Republic) Ales Loprais (Czech Republic) Milan Holáň (Czech Republic) Vojtěch Štajf	Tatra	(Russia) Firdaus Kabirov (Russia) Andrey Mokeev (Russia) Anatoly Tanin	Kamaz	(Russia) Andrey Karginov (Russia) Vyacheslav Mizyukaev (Russia) Igor Devyatkin	Kamaz
2012	(Russia) Airat Mardeev (Russia) Aydar Belyaev (Russia) Anton Mirniy	Kamaz	(Netherlands) Peter Versluis (Netherlands) Jurgen Damen (Netherlands) Harry Schuurmans	MAN	(Russia) Anton Shibalov (Russia) Robert Amatych (Russia) Ildar Saysultanov	Kamaz
2013	(Russia) Dmitry Sotnikov (Russia) Vyacheslav Mizyukaev (Russia) Andrey Aferin	Kamaz	(Russia) Anton Shibalov (Russia) Robert Amatych (Russia) Almaz Hisamiev	Kamaz	(Belarus) Siarhei Viazovich (Belarus) Alexander Polishchuk (Belarus) Dmitry Vikhrenko	MAZ
2016	(Russia) Airat Mardeev (Russia) Aydar Belyaev (Russia) Dmitriy Svistunov	Kamaz	(Russia) Dmitry Sotnikov (Russia) Ruslan Akhmadeev (Russia) Ivan Romanov	Kamaz	(Netherlands) Martin van den Brink (Netherlands) Peter Willemsen (Czech Republic) Daniel Kozlovský	Renault
2017	(Russia) Dmitry Sotnikov (Russia) Ruslan Akhmadeev (Russia) Ilnur Mustafin	Kamaz	(Russia) Anton Shibalov (Russia) Andrey Mokeev (Russia) Dmitry Nikitin	Kamaz	(Russia) Airat Mardeev (Russia) Aydar Belyaev (Russia) Dmitriy Svistunov	Kamaz
2018	(Russia) Andrey Karginov (Russia) Andrey Mokeev (Russia) Igor Leonov	Kamaz	(Russia) Airat Mardeev (Russia) Aydar Belyaev (Russia) Akhmet Galyautdinov	Kamaz	(Russia) Anton Shibalov (Russia) Dmitry Nikitin (Russia) Ivan Romanov	Kamaz
2019	(Russia) Anton Shibalov (Russia) Dmitry Nikitin (Russia) Ivan Tatarinov	Kamaz	(Russia) Andrey Karginov (Russia) Andrey Mokeev (Russia) Ivan Malkov	Kamaz	(Russia) Airat Mardeev (Russia) Dmitry Svistunov (Russia) Sergey Krenev	Kamaz
2021	(Russia) Dmitry Sotnikov (Russia) Ruslan Akhmadeev (Russia) Ilgiz Akhmetzianov	Kamaz	(Belarus) Siarhei Viazovich (Belarus) Pavel Haranin (Belarus) Anton Zaparoshchanka	MAZ	(Russia) Anton Shibalov (Russia) Dmitry Nikitin (Russia) Ivan Tatarinov	Kamaz
2022	(Russia) Dmitry Sotnikov (Russia) Ruslan Akhmadeev (Russia) Ilgiz Akhmetzianov	Kamaz	(Russia) Eduard Nikolaev (Russia) Evgenii Iakovlev (Russia) Bogdan Karimov	Kamaz	(Belarus) Siarhei Viazovich (Belarus) Pavel Haranin (Belarus) Vitaliy Murylev	MAZ
2023	(Belarus) Siarhei Viazovich (Belarus) Pavel Haranin (Belarus) Andrei Krahelskiy	MAZ	(Russia) Eduard Nikolaev (Russia) Evgenii Iakovlev (Russia) Dmitry Avdeev	Kamaz	(Russia) Andrey Karginov (Russia) Ivan Malkov (Russia) Vadim Akhmetov	Kamaz
2024	(Russia) Dmitry Sotnikov (Russia) Ruslan Akhmadeev (Russia) Ilgiz Akhmetzianov	Kamaz	(Russia) Eduard Nikolaev (Russia) Evgenii Iakovlev (Russia) Dmitry Avdeev	Kamaz	(Belarus) Siarhei Viazovich (Belarus) Pavel Haranin (Belarus) Andrei Krahelskiy	MAZ
2025	(Russia) Anton Shibalov (Russia) Alexander Kupriyanov (Russia) Daniil Telepov	Kamaz	(Russia) Eduard Nikolaev (Russia) Evgeny Yakovlev (Russia) Vladislav Glukhov	Kamaz	(Russia) Almaz Akhmedov (Russia) Ivan Malkov (Russia) Ivan Tatarinov	Kamaz

=== Moto ===
Year	1st		2nd		3rd	
Year	Driver	Bike	Driver	Bike	Driver	Bike
2019	(United Kingdom) Sam Sunderland	KTM	(United States) Andrew Short	Husqvarna	(France) Adrien van Beveren	Yamaha
2021	(Austria) Matthias Walkner	KTM	(United States) Skyler Howes	Husqvarna	(Argentina) Franco Caimi	Hero
2022	(Russia) Alexey Naumov	KTM	(Russia) Alexander Gatiyatulin	KTM	(Russia) Evgeny Tikhonov	KTM
2023	(Russia) Ilya Scheglov	Husqvarna				
2024	(Russia) Alexey Naumov	Husqvarna	(Mongolia) Murun Purevdorj	KTM	(Russia) Ekaterina Zhadanova	KTM
2025	(Mongolia) Murun Purevdorj	KTM	(Russia) Ekaterina Zhadanova	KTM	(Russia) Oleg Pavlenko	KTM

=== Quads ===
Year	1st		2nd	
Year	Rider	Quad	Rider	Quad
2019	(Poland) Rafal Sonik	Yamaha	(Russia) Alexander Maximov	Yamaha
2021	(Russia) Alexander Maximov	Yamaha	(Poland) Rafal Sonik	Yamaha
2022	(Russia) Dmitry Kalinin	Can-Am		
2023	(Russia) Anatoly Kuznetsov	Can-Am		
2024	(Russia) Danil Loginov	Can-Am	(Russia) Azat Shaimukhametov	Can-Am
2025	(Russia) Alexey Zverev	Russian Mechanics	(Russia) Dmitry Kalinin	Russian Mechanics
