= 2016 Silk Way Rally =

Off-road vehicle race

Seasons
- ← 2015 2017 →

The 2016 Silk Way Rally was run in Russia, Kazakhstan, and China on July 9–24, 2016.

It began in Moscow on the 9th and ends in Beijing on the 24th. It features the primary classes of cars and trucks.

Official winners are Cyril Despres and Ayrat Mardeev.

== Stages ==
Stage	Date	From	To	Road Section		Special		Total		Stage winners	
Stage	Date	From	To	km	mi	km	mi	km	mi	Autos	Trucks
1	9 July	(Russia) Moscow	(Russia) Kazan	853	530	2	1	855	531	(France) S. Peterhansel	(Netherlands) M. van den Brink
2	10 July	(Russia) Kazan	(Russia) Ufa	490	304	135	83	625	387	Stage cancelled	
3	11 July	(Russia) Ufa	(Kazakhstan) Kostanay	614	381	200	124	814	505	(France) C. Despres	(Russia) A. Karginov
4	12 July	(Kazakhstan) Kostanay	(Kazakhstan) Astana	510	316	345	214	855	531	(France) S. Peterhansel	(Russia) E. Nikolaev
5	13 July	(Kazakhstan) Astana	(Kazakhstan) Balkhash	251	155	568	353	819	509	(France) C. Despres	(Netherlands) M. van den Brink
6	14 July	(Kazakhstan) Balkhash	(Kazakhstan) Almaty	444	275	411	256	855	531	(France) S. Peterhansel	(Russia) A. Mardeev
	15 July	(Kazakhstan) Almaty		Rest day							
7	16 July	(Kazakhstan) Almaty	(China) Bortala	505	314	77	48	582	362	(France) C. Despres	(Netherlands) M. van den Brink
8	17 July	(China) Bortala	(China) Urumqi	649	403	257	160	906	563	(Saudi Arabia) Y. Al-Rajhi	(Netherlands) M. van den Brink
9	18 July	(China) Urumqi	(China) Hami	335	208	384	239	719	447	(France) C. Despres	(Russia) A. Mardeev
10	19 July	(China) Hami	(China) Dunhuang	185	115	340	211	525	326	(France) S. Peterhansel	(Netherlands) M. van den Brink
11	20 July	(China) Dunhuang	(China) Jiayuguan	230	143	330	205	560	348	Stage cancelled	
12	21 July	(China) Jiayuguan	(China) Alashan	241	150	425	264	666	414	(France) C. Despres	(Russia) E. Nikolaev
13	22 July	(China) Alashan	(China) Wuhai	357	222	367	228	724	450	(France) S. Peterhansel	(Russia) E. Nikolaev
14	23 July	(China) Wuhai	(China) Hohhot	494	307	261	162	755	469	(Saudi Arabia) Y. Al-Rajhi	(Russia) A. Mardeev
15	24 July	(China) Hohhot	(China) Beijing	507	315	0	0	507	315	Liaison only	
TOTALS				km	mi	km	mi	km	mi		
Cars & Trucks				6,665	4,141	4,102	2,548	10,767	6,690		

== Stage results ==
=== Cars ===
	Stage result					General classification				
Stage	Pos	Competitor	Make	Time	Gap	Pos	Competitor	Make	Time	Gap
1	1	(France) Stephane Peterhansel (France) Jean-Paul Cottret	Peugeot	00:01:31		1	(France) Stephane Peterhansel (France) Jean-Paul Cottret	Peugeot	00:01:31	
1	2	(Russia) Vladimir Vasilyev (Russia) Konstantin Zhiltsov	Mini	00:01:35	00:00:04	2	(Russia) Vladimir Vasilyev (Russia) Konstantin Zhiltsov	Mini	00:01:35	00:00:04
1	3	(France) Sébastien Loeb (Monaco) Daniel Elena	Peugeot	00:01:35	00:00:04	3	(France) Sébastien Loeb (Monaco) Daniel Elena	Peugeot	00:01:35	00:00:04
1	Stage cancelled due to bad weather									
3	1	(France) Cyril Despres (France) David Castera	Peugeot	01:56:45		1	(France) Cyril Despres (France) David Castera	Peugeot	01:58:24	
3	2	(Saudi Arabia) Yazeed Al-Rajhi (Germany) Timo Gottschalk	Mini	01:59:25	00:02:40	2	(Saudi Arabia) Yazeed Al-Rajhi (Germany) Timo Gottschalk	Mini	02:01:01	00:02:37
3	3	(France) Sébastien Loeb (Monaco) Daniel Elena	Peugeot	02:00:59	00:04:14	3	(France) Sébastien Loeb (Monaco) Daniel Elena	Peugeot	02:02:34	00:04:10
4	1	(France) Stephane Peterhansel (France) Jean-Paul Cottret	Peugeot	01:57:58		1	(France) Stephane Peterhansel (France) Jean-Paul Cottret	Peugeot	04:05:14	
4	2	(Russia) Vladimir Vasilyev (Russia) Konstantin Zhiltsov	Mini	02:04:20	00:06:22	2	(Russia) Vladimir Vasilyev (Russia) Konstantin Zhiltsov	Mini	04:07:55	00:02:41
4	3	(France) Sébastien Loeb (Monaco) Daniel Elena	Peugeot	02:05:31	00:07:33	3	(France) Sébastien Loeb (Monaco) Daniel Elena	Peugeot	04:08:05	00:02:51
5	1	(France) Cyril Despres (France) David Castera	Peugeot	05:37:52		1	(France) Cyril Despres (France) David Castera	Peugeot	09:47:05	
5	2	(Saudi Arabia) Yazeed Al-Rajhi (Germany) Timo Gottschalk	Mini	05:49:08	00:11:16	2	(France) Sébastien Loeb (Monaco) Daniel Elena	Peugeot	10:01:27	00:14:22
5	3	(Kazakhstan) Aidyn Rakhimbayev (Russia) Anton Nikolaev	Mini	05:51:03	00:13:11	3	(Saudi Arabia) Yazeed Al-Rajhi (Germany) Timo Gottschalk	Mini	10:01:43	00:14:38
6	1	(France) Stephane Peterhansel (France) Jean-Paul Cottret	Peugeot	01:12:50		1	(France) Cyril Despres (France) David Castera	Peugeot	11:06:35	
6	2	(France) Sébastien Loeb (Monaco) Daniel Elena	Peugeot	01:13:08	00:00:18	2	(France) Sébastien Loeb (Monaco) Daniel Elena	Peugeot	11:14:35	00:08:00
6	3	(Russia) Vladimir Vasilyev (Russia) Konstantin Zhiltsov	Mini	01:14:04	00:01:14	3	(Russia) Vladimir Vasilyev (Russia) Konstantin Zhiltsov	Mini	11:16:25	00:09:50

== Final standings ==
=== Cars ===
Pos	No.	Driver	Co-driver	Car	Entrant	Time	Gap
1	104	(France) Cyril Despres	(France) David Castera	Peugeot	Team Peugeot Total	36:15:18	
2	103	(Saudi Arabia) Yazeed Al-Rajhi	(Germany) Timo Gottschalk	Mini	X-Raid Team	36:41:09	+ 00:25:51
3	101	(Russia) Vladimir Vasilyev	(Russia) Konstantin Zhiltsov	Mini	G-Energy Team	37:05:04	+ 00:49:46
4	105	(United Kingdom) Harry Hunt	(Germany) Andreas Schulz	Mini	X-Raid Team	38:10:05	+ 01:54:47
5	106	(Kazakhstan) Aidyn Rakhimbayev	(Russia) Anton Nikolaev	Mini	Astana Motorsport	38:28:03	+ 02:12:45
6	108	(China) Wei Han	(France) Jean-Pierre Garcin	SMG	Geely Hangwei SMG Team	38:53:46	+ 02:38:28
7	102	(France) Sébastien Loeb	(Monaco) Daniel Elena	Peugeot	Team Peugeot Total	40:17:19	+ 04:02:01
8	116	(France) Jerome Pelichet	(France) Eugenie Decré	Toyota	Raid Lynx	40:44:02	+ 04:28:44
9	166	(Netherlands) Cornelis Koolen	(France) Pascal Larroque	Optimus	MD Rallye Sport	41:08:30	+ 04:53:12
10	109	(Kazakhstan) Bauyrzhan Issabayev	(Russia) Vladimir Demyanenko	Mini	Astana Motorsport	41:23:27	+ 05:08:09

=== Trucks ===
Pos	No.	Driver	Co-Driver & mechanic	Truck	Entrant	Time	Gap
1	306	(Russia) Ayrat Mardeev	(Russia) Aydar Belyaev (Russia) Dmitriy Svistunov	Kamaz	Kamaz-Master	39:23:18	
2	300	(Russia) Dmitry Sotnikov	(Russia) Ruslan Akhmadeev (Russia) Ivan Romanov	Kamaz	Kamaz-Master	39:38:46	+ 00:15:28
3	301	(Netherlands) Maarten van den Brink	(Belgium) Peter Willemsen (Czech Republic) Daniel Kozlowski	Renault	Mammoet Rallysport	39:56:44	+ 00:33:26
4	310	(Russia) Eduard Nikolaev	(Russia) Evgeni Yakovlev (Russia) Vladimir Rybakov	Kamaz	Kamaz-Master	40:56:11	+ 01:32:53
5	315	(China) Hou Hongning	(China) Shen Xin (Russia) Andrey Mokeev	Kamaz	Kamaz-Master	42:42:14	+ 03:18:56
6	302	(Belarus) Siarhei Viazovich	(Belarus) Pavel Haranin (Belarus) Andrey Zhyhulin	MAZ	MAZ-Sport auto	42:50:59	+ 03:27:51
7	305	(Netherlands) Pascal de Baar	(Netherlands) Martin Roesinck (Netherlands) Wouter Rosegaar	Renault	Mammoet Rallysport	45:15:46	+ 05:52:28
8	303	(Russia) Anton Shibalov	(Russia) Robert Amatych (Russia) Almaz Khisamiev	Kamaz	Kamaz-Master	45:57:56	+ 06:34:38
9	308	(Belarus) Aleksandr Vasilevski	(Belarus) Dzmitry Vikhrenka (Belarus) Anton Zaparoshchanka	MAZ	MAZ-Sport auto	46:04:04	+ 06:40:46
10	312	(Belarus) Aliaksei Vishneuski	(Belarus) Maksim Novikau (Belarus) Konstantin Siniabok	MAZ	MAZ-Sport auto	48:25:18	+ 09:02:00
