= Alexey Naumov =

Russian motorcycle racer (born 1978)

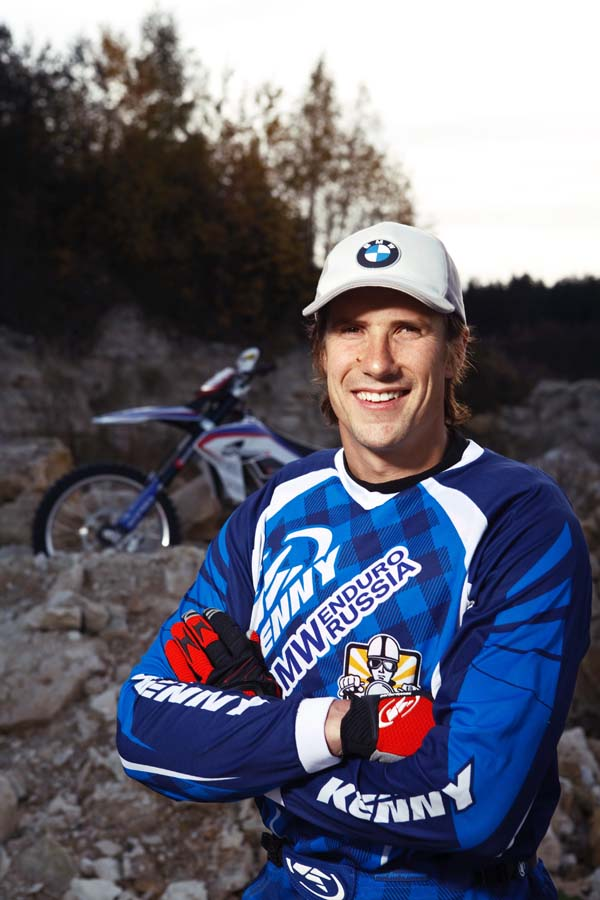

Alexey Lvovich Naumov (Russian: Алексей Львович Наумов; born May 11, 1978, in Kolomna, Moscow Oblast) is a Russian professional motorcycle enduro and rally racer.
