= 2012 Desafio Litoral Rally =

Sports event

The 2012 Desafio Litoral Rally was a first edition of rally raid endurance race held in Argentina from 23–28 July 2012. It was the first Dakar Series rally held in South America. The itinerary contained 3,454 kilometres of roads and tracks in total, including 1,840 of timed sections. It was organized by the Amaury Sport Organisation.

== Itinerary ==
The race was held in public roads in the northeastern Argentine provinces of Misiones, Corrientes and Chaco. The original route included two stops at Asunción and Encarnación in Paraguay, but were cancelled prior to the event because of political instability after the impeachment of the president.

- 23 July: Iguazú – Posadas
- 24 July: Posadas – Posadas
- 25 July: Posadas – Bella Vista
- 26 July: Bella Vista – Corrientes
- 27 July: Corrientes – Resistencia
- 28 July: Resistencia – Resistencia

== Stage results ==
=== Bikes ===
	Stage result					General classification				
Stage	Pos	Competitor	Make	Time	Difference	Pos	Competitor	Make	Time	Difference
1	1	(Chile) Francisco López	KTM	4:12:30		1	(Chile) Francisco López	KTM	4:12:30	
1	2	(France) Cyril Despres	KTM	4:14:19	+1:49	2	(France) Cyril Despres	KTM	4:14:19	+1:49
1	3	(Poland) Jakub Przygoński	KTM	4:16:42	+4:12	3	(Poland) Jakub Przygoński	KTM	4:16:42	+4:12
2	1	(France) Cyril Despres	KTM	2:49:40		1	(France) Cyril Despres	KTM	7:03.59	
2	2	(Poland) Jakub Przygoński	KTM	2:51:30	+1:50	2	(Poland) Jakub Przygoński	KTM	7:08:12	+4:13
2	3	(Chile) Francisco López	KTM	2:56:06	+6:26	3	(Chile) Francisco López	KTM	7:08:36	+4:37
4	1	(France) Cyril Despres	KTM	3:28:17		1	(France) Cyril Despres	KTM	10:32:16	
4	2	(Poland) Jakub Przygoński	KTM	3:29:48	+1:31	2	(Poland) Jakub Przygoński	KTM	10:38:00	+5:44
4	3	(Poland) Tadeusz Błażusiak	KTM	3:37:08	+8:51	3	(Argentina) Mauricio Gomez	Yamaha	11:29:24	+57:08
5	1	(Argentina) Mauricio Gomez	Yamaha	2:38:41		1	(France) Cyril Despres	KTM	13:16:41	
5	2	(Argentina) Pablo Rodríguez	Honda	2:41:33	+2:52	2	(Poland) Jakub Przygoński	KTM	13:20:25	+3:44
5	3	(Poland) Jakub Przygoński	KTM	2:42:25	+3:44	3	(Argentina) Mauricio Gomez	Yamaha	14:08:05	+1:02:24
6	1	(France) Cyril Despres	KTM	40:13		1	(France) Cyril Despres	KTM	13:56:54	
6	2	(Argentina) Mauricio Gomez	Yamaha	41:04	+0:51	2	(Poland) Jakub Przygoński	KTM	14:01:39	+4:45
6	3	(Poland) Jakub Przygoński	KTM	41:14	+1:01	3	(Argentina) Mauricio Gomez	Yamaha	15:09:09	+1:03:15

== Results ==
=== Bikes ===
1. Cyril Despres (KTM) 13:56:54
2. Jakub Przygoński (KTM) +4:45
3. Mauricio Gomez (Yamaha) +1:03:15
4. Pablo Rodríguez (Honda) +1:33:38
5. Javier Pizzolito (Honda) +1:35:52

=== Cars ===
1. Orlando Terranova/Paulo Fiuza (BMW) 12:48:06
2. Nani Roma/Michel Périn (Mini) +26.39
3. Boris Garafulic/Gilles Picard (BMW) +1:39:56
4. Omar Gandara/Mauricio Jeromin (Toyota) +3:15:32
5. Roberto Recalde/Carlos Zarza (Higher) +3:26:26

=== Quads 4x2 ===
1. Sergio Lafuente
2. Gastón González
3. Sebastián Foche
4. Francisco Bartucci
5. Germán Wolenberg

=== Quads 4x4 ===
1. Daniel Mazzucco
2. Ezio Blangino
3. Claudio Cavigliasso
4. Pablo Ríos
5. Pablo Bustamante

=== UTV ===
1. Omar Yoma
2. Alberto Depetris
3. Pablo Depetris
4. Hugo Zucchini
5. Carlos González
