= Merzouga Rally =

Off-road vehicle race

- Region: Morocco
- Inaugural season: 2010
- Official website: www.merzougarally.com

Merzouga Rally is a rally raid race that takes place every October since 2010 in Merzouga, Morocco. It is a five-day race plus prologue and a marathon stage. The stages are varied and around 200–300 km long.

Navigation is the key and the competitors use the GPS Unik2, the same used on the Dakar Rally. Safety is important as well with the competitors using the Iritrack, the tracking system studied for the African rallies. Plus a professional medical staff with 4x4 ambulances and doctors on bike and quad along the track and heli-ambulance service.

To meet the needs of the professional riders but also the necessities of amateurs, the Merzouga Rally features the division of the route into 2 categories:

- Pro: open to pro riders and those competitors ready for an ultimate challenge
- Expert: a technical and navigated route but less extreme stages as the Expert riders will cover the 75% of the complete route of the Pro riders.

The Merzouga Raid is ideal for those who face the desert for the first time. At their own pace, riding on the same route of the rally in small groups with an expert guide. The vehicles will be equipped with world track, the satellite system that allow to follow the vehicles on track in real time. (for the rider no sports licence is required). Merzouga Rally took originally place in October and then was organized in April: the 2020 edition was originally planned on May, although it was finally cancelled due to the COVID-19 pandemic. The organizers postponed it until its next edition on 2021, which it never took place.

== History ==
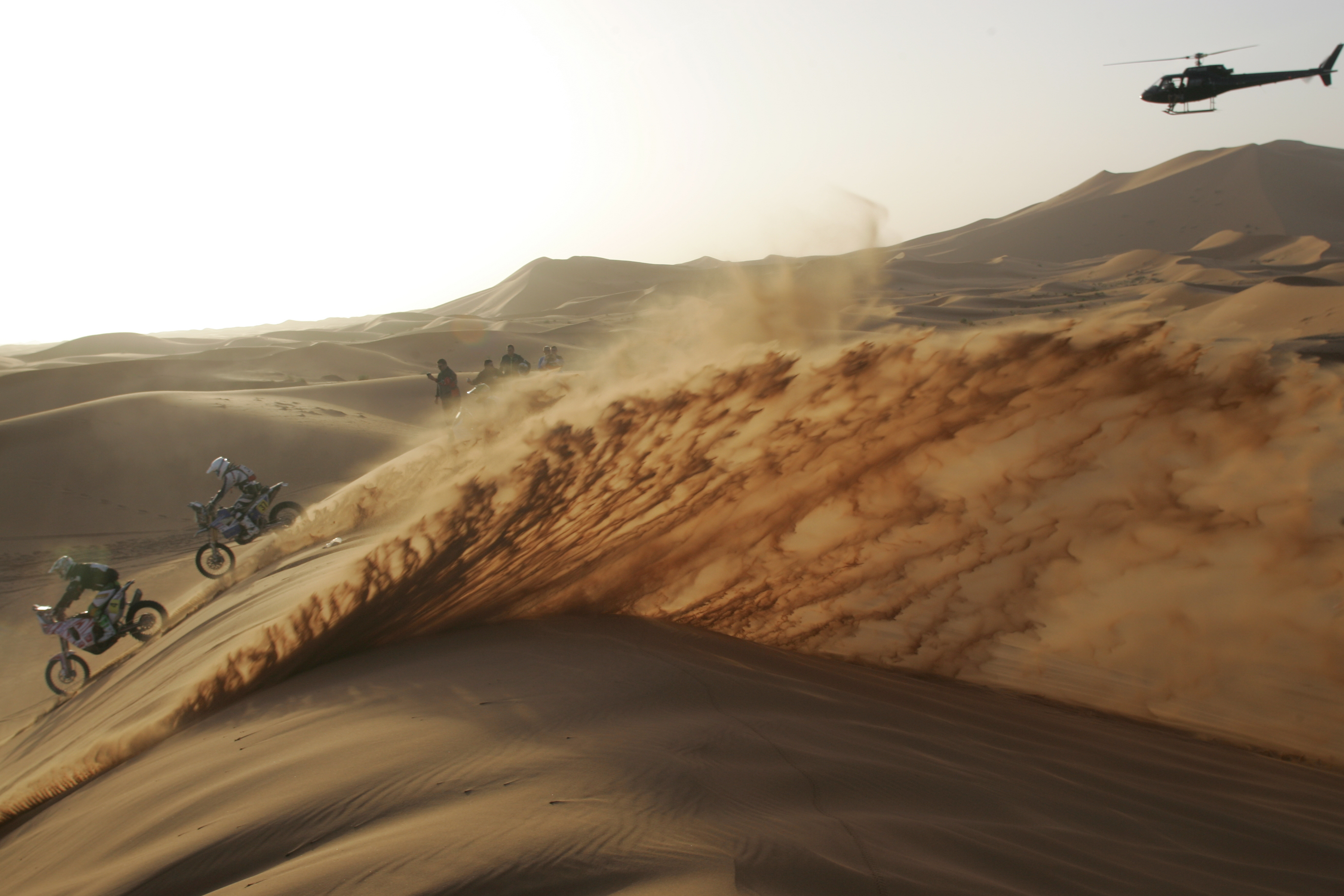
Landscape of a stage

In 2010, 40 competitors took part to the first edition of the Merzouga Rally. Every year the rally grows reaching an average of more than 120 vehicles on track. Studied by Italian promoter Edoardo Mossi, the Merzouga Rally formula is addressed to all amateurs that challenge the desert for the first time, but also for the professional riders who wish to train in preparation of the Dakar Rally. Many riders described Merzouga as ''the perfect training for the Dakar''. The race is open to the bike, quad and SxS categories (side-by-side).

== Editions ==
The winners of the Merzouga Rally in the bikes include Helder Rodrigues, Sam Sunderland, Pål Anders Ullevålseter, Kevin Benavides, Joan Barreda and Adrien van Beveren, who used the Moroccan rally as a launch pad for the Dakar.

In quads, the most famous winners are Nicolas Cavigliasso (who won Dakar 2019), Camelia Liparoti six time FIM Women's Cross-Country Rallies World Cup winner and multi finisher in the Dakar aboard quads and SxS, and Axel Dutrie two-time Merzouga winner in this category.

The SxS category has seen wins from Nasser Al-Attiyah the Qatarian driver and four-time Dakar car winner, Reinaldo Varela SxS Dakar winner, and Annie Seel the multi time finisher in the Dakar on bikes.

=== Winners ===
Year	Bike		Quad		SxS	
Year	Rider	Make	Rider	Make	Driver Co-driver	Make
2010	(Portugal) Helder Rodrigues	Yamaha	(Italy) Camelia Liparoti	KTM	(France) Julien Roustan (France) Daniel Pernot	Polaris
2011	(Poland) Jakub Przygoński	KTM	(France) Michel Scarcella	Can-Am	(France) Oliver Abel (France) Christian Manez	Polaris
2012	(Poland) Jacek Czachor	KTM	(Italy) Patrick Marto	Polaris	(France) Frederic Henrichy (France) Thierry Costa	Polaris
2013	(United Kingdom) Sam Sunderland	Honda	(Spain) Fernandez Covadonga	?	(Australia) Garry Connell (Sweden) Annie Seel	Polaris
2014	(Norway) Pål Anders Ullevålseter	KTM	(Spain) Diego Ortega Gil	Yamaha	(France) Frederic Henrichy (France) Eric Bersey	Polaris
2015	(Italy) Alessandro Botturi	Yamaha	(Spain) Diego Ortega Gil	Yamaha	(Italy) Roberto Tonetti (Italy) Maurizio Dominella	Polaris
2016	(Argentina) Kevin Benavides	Honda	(Germany) Clemens Eicker	E-ATV	(France) Frederic Henrichy (France) Eric Bersey	Polaris
2017	(France) Xavier De Soultrait	Yamaha	(Argentina) Nicolás Cavigliasso	Yamaha	(France) Frederic Henrichy (France) Eric Bersey	Polaris
2018	(Spain) Joan Barreda Bort	Honda	(France) Axel Dutrie	Yamaha	(Brazil) Reinaldo Varela (Brazil) Gustavo Gugelmin	Can-Am
2019	(France) Adrien Van Beveren	Yamaha	(France) Axel Dutrie	Yamaha	(Qatar) Nasser Al-Attiyah (France) Matthieu Baumel	Can-Am

== See also ==
- Rally raid
- Rally Dakar
