= 2021 FIM Cross-Country Rallies World Championship =

2021 FIM Cross-Country Rallies World Championship
Previous:	2020	Next:	2022 (W2RC)

The 2021 FIM Cross-Country Rallies World Championship was the 18th and final season of the FIM Cross-Country Rallies World Championship, an international rally raid competition for motorbikes and quads. Due to COVID-19 pandemic all events in the previous season were cancelled.

== Calendar ==
The calendar for the 2021 season is set to feature six long-distance rally raid events; including two marathon events in the Silk Way Rally and the Rally dos Sertões.

Original Date	Rally name
7–13 June	Rally Kazakhstan
1–11 July	(Russia) (Mongolia) Silk Way Rally
13–22 August	(Brazil) Rally dos Sertões
8–13 October	(Morocco) Rallye du Maroc
6–12 November	(United Arab Emirates) Abu Dhabi Desert Challenge

== Regulations and categories ==
New categories were initially intended to have been introduced in 2020, but due to that season's cancellation, they will come into effect in 2021 instead. The RallyGP category being for professionals and experienced riders, Rally2 for newcomers, and the Rally Adventure trophy for riders without assistance. SSVs would be introduced as their own category for all events.

The end of season there would be awards as follows:

- World Championship for RallyGP riders and manufacturers in the bike class
- World Cups for Rally2 riders in the Moto-Rally, Moto-Enduro, and Quad groups.
- World Cups for women and juniors in the RallyGP category
- World Cups for SSVs

Russian athletes and teams competed as a neutral competitors using the designation MFR (Motorcycle Federation of Russia), as the Court of Arbitration for Sport upheld a ban on Russia competing at World Championships. The ban was implemented by the World Anti-Doping Agency in response to state-sponsored doping program of Russian athletes.

== Entry list ==
RallyGP Teams & Riders
Constructor	Bike	Team	Rider	Rounds
Gas Gas	RC 450F	(Austria) Gas Gas Factory Racing Rally Team	(Australia) Daniel Sanders	1–2, 4–5
Hero	450 Rally	(India) Hero Motorsports Team Rally	(Argentina) Franco Caimi	1–2, 4–5
Hero	450 Rally	(India) Hero Motorsports Team Rally	(Germany) Sebastian Bühler	1–2, 4–5
Hero	450 Rally	(India) Hero Motorsports Team Rally	(Portugal) Joaquim Rodrigues	1–2, 4–5
Honda	CRF 450 Rally	(Japan) Monster Energy Honda Team	(United States) Ricky Brabec	4
Honda	CRF 450 Rally	(Japan) Monster Energy Honda Team	(Spain) Joan Barreda	4
Honda	CRF 450 Rally	(Japan) Monster Energy Honda Team	(Chile) José Ignacio Cornejo	4
Honda	CRF 450 Rally	(Japan) Monster Energy Honda Team	(Chile) Pablo Quintanilla	4
Honda	CRF 450RX	(Brazil) Honda Racing Rally Team	(Brazil) Gregorio Caselani	3
Husqvarna	450 Rally Factory Replica	(Austria) Rockstar Energy Husqvarna Factory Racing	(United States) Skyler Howes	1–2, 4
Husqvarna	450 Rally Factory Replica	(Austria) Rockstar Energy Husqvarna Factory Racing	(Argentina) Luciano Benavides	1–2, 4
Husqvarna	450 Rally Factory Replica	(Netherlands) HT Rally Raid Husqvarna Racing	(France) Xavier de Soultrait	4
Husqvarna	450 Rally Factory Replica	(Italy) Solarys Racing	(Italy) Jacopo Cerutti	4
Husqvarna	450 Rally Factory Replica	(Italy) Africa Dream Racing	(Italy) Maurizio Gerini	4
Husqvarna	450 Rally Factory Replica	G-Drive Team	Anastasiya Nifontova	5
Husqvarna	450 Rally	(United Arab Emirates) Vendetta Racing UAE	(United Kingdom) David McBride	5
KTM	450 Rally Factory Replica	(Austria) Red Bull KTM Factory Racing	(United Kingdom) Sam Sunderland	1, 4
KTM	450 Rally Factory Replica	(Austria) Red Bull KTM Factory Racing	(Argentina) Kevin Benavides	4
KTM	450 Rally Factory Replica	(Austria) Red Bull KTM Factory Racing	(Austria) Matthias Walkner	1–2, 4–5
KTM	450 Rally Factory Replica	(Austria) Red Bull KTM Factory Racing	(Australia) Toby Price	4
KTM	450 Rally Factory Replica	(Saudi Arabia) Saudi Dirtbike Center	(Saudi Arabia) Mishal Alghuneim	5
KTM	450 Rally Replica	(Slovakia) Norwit Racing	(Slovakia) Stefan Svitko	4
KTM	450 Rally Replica	(Czech Republic) Orion - Moto Racing Group	(Czech Republic) Milan Engel	4
KTM	450 Rally Replica	(Poland) Duust Rally Team	(Poland) Konrad Dąbrowski	4–5
KTM	450 Rally Replica	(United Arab Emirates) MX Ride Dubai	(United Arab Emirates) Mohammed Al Balooshi	5
KTM	450 Rally Replica	(United Arab Emirates) MX Ride Dubai	(United Arab Emirates) Sultan Al Balooshi	5
KTM	450 Rally Replica	(United Arab Emirates) MX Ride Dubai	(Kuwait) Abdullah Al Shatti	5
KTM	450 Rally Replica	(United Arab Emirates) Vendetta Racing UAE	(United Kingdom) David Mabbs	5
KTM	450 Rally	(Spain) FN Speed Team	(Bolivia) Daniel Nosiglia	4
KTM	450 Rally	(France) Nomade Racing	(France) Mathieu Doveze	4
KTM	450 Rally	(Portugal) Patrão Motorsport	(Chile) Tomas De Gavardo	4
KTM	450 Rally	(United Arab Emirates) Motozone Dubai	(South Africa) Aaron Mare	5
Sherco	Rally 450 RTR	(France) Sherco TVS Rally Factory	(Spain) Lorenzo Santolino	4
Sherco	Rally 450 RTR	(France) Sherco TVS Rally Factory	(Portugal) Rui Gonçalves	4
Sherco	Rally 450 RTR	(France) Sherco TVS Rally Factory	(India) Harith Noah	4
Yamaha	WR450F Rally	(Japan) Monster Energy Yamaha Rally Official Team	(Botswana) Ross Branch	1–2, 4–5
Yamaha	WR450F Rally	(Japan) Monster Energy Yamaha Rally Official Team	(United States) Andrew Short	1–2, 4–5
Yamaha	WR450F Rally	(Japan) Monster Energy Yamaha Rally Official Team	(France) Adrien Van Beveren	1–2, 4–5
Yamaha	WR450F Rally	(Portugal) Francosport	(Portugal) Antonio Maio	4
Rally2:Moto-Rally World Cup Teams & Riders
Constructor	Bike	Team	Rider	Rounds
Honda	CRF 450 Rally RX RS	(Italy) RS Moto Racing Team	(Italy) Carlo Cabini	1–2, 4
Honda	CRF 450 Rally RX RS	(Italy) RS Moto Racing Team	(France) Julien Barthélémy	4
Honda	CRF 450 Rally RX RS	(Italy) RS Moto Racing Team	(Italy) Eufrasio Anghileri	4
Honda	CRF 450 Rally RX RS	(Italy) RS Moto Racing Team	(Switzerland) Nicolas Monnin	4
Honda	CRF 450 Rally RX RS	(Italy) RS Moto Racing Team	(France) Kévin Durand	4
Honda	CRF 450 Rally RX RS	(Italy) Never Stop Dreaming	(Italy) Francesca Gasperi	4
Honda	CRF 450RX	(Brazil) Honda Racing Rally Team	(Brazil) Julio Zavatti	3
Honda	CRF 450RX	(Brazil) Honda Racing Rally Team	(Brazil) Jean Azevedo	3
Honda	CRF 450L	(France) Jaunin Productions	(France) Guillaume Jaunin	4
Husqvarna	450 Rally Factory Replica	(Mongolia) Nomadic	(Mongolia) Ganzorig Chuluun	2
Husqvarna	450 Rally Factory Replica	(Italy) Solarys Racing	(Italy) Paolo Lucci	4
Husqvarna	450 Rally Factory Replica	(Netherlands) HT Rally Raid Husqvarna Racing	(Argentina) Diego Noras	4
Husqvarna	450 Rally Factory Replica	(Netherlands) HT Rally Raid Husqvarna Racing	(Belgium) Walter Roelants	4
Husqvarna	450 Rally Factory Replica		(France) Martin Bonnet	4
Husqvarna	450 Rally Factory Replica	(Italy) Africa Dream Racing	(Italy) Leonardo Tonelli	4
Husqvarna	450 Rally Factory Replica	(France) Nomade Racing	(France) Max Bianucci	4
Husqvarna	450 Rally Factory Replica	(Spain) Club Aventura Touareg	(Spain) Herbert Kolling	4
Husqvarna	FE450 Rally Replica	(Portugal) Francosport	(Portugal) Bruno Santos	4
Husqvarna	FE450 Rally Replica		(France) Clément Razy	4
Husqvarna	FE450 Rally Replica		(United Kingdom) Brett Hunt	5
Husqvarna	FE450 Rally Replica		(Sweden) Tomas Kristoffersson	5
Husqvarna	450 Rally	(Spain) TwinTrail Racing Team	(Spain) Albert Martín	4
Husqvarna	450 Rally	(Belgium) Anquety Motorsport	(Belgium) Jerome Martiny	4
Husqvarna	450 Rally	(France) Team Dumontier Racing	(France) Sébastien Herbet	4
Husqvarna	450 Rally	(France) Team Dumontier Racing	(France) Romain Dumontier	4
Husqvarna	450 Rally	(France) Nomade Racing	(France) Lois D'Abbadie	4
Husqvarna	450 Rally	(Spain) Club Aventura Touareg	(Spain) Francisco Chana	4
Husqvarna	450 Rally	(Poland) Duust Rally Team	(United States) Jacob Argubright	5
Husqvarna	450 Rally	(United Arab Emirates) SRG Motorsports	(South Africa) Michael Docherty	5
KTM	450 Rally Factory Replica	(Italy) McDonald's Rally Team	(Italy) Massimo Camurri	2
KTM	450 Rally Factory Replica	KTM Mongolia	(Mongolia) Murun Purevdorj	2
KTM	450 Rally Factory Replica	G-Moto Mongolia	(Mongolia) Battur Baatar	2
KTM	450 Rally Factory Replica	G-Moto Mongolia	(Mongolia) Temuujin Ganzorig	2
KTM	450 Rally Factory Replica	G-Moto Mongolia	(Mongolia) Enkhsaruul Davaa	2
KTM	450 Rally Factory Replica	(Netherlands) BAS Dakar KTM Racing Team	(South Africa) Bradley Cox	4
KTM	450 Rally Factory Replica	(Netherlands) BAS Dakar KTM Racing Team	(Netherlands) Wiljan Van Wikselaar	4
KTM	450 Rally Factory Replica	(France) Team Baïnes Rally	(France) Camille Chapeliere	4
KTM	450 Rally Factory Replica	(France) Team RS Concept	(France) Bertrand Gavard	4
KTM	450 Rally Factory Replica	(Italy) Motoclub Yashica	(Italy) Andrea Winkler	4
KTM	450 Rally Factory Replica	(Italy) Motoclub Yashica	(Italy) Aldo Winkler	4
KTM	450 Rally Factory Replica	(France) Nomade Racing	(France) Jean-Loup Lepan	4
KTM	450 Rally Factory Replica	(France) Nomade Racing	(France) Pierre Peyrard	4
KTM	450 Rally Factory Replica	(France) Nomade Racing	(Italy) Lorenzo Maestrami	4
KTM	450 Rally Factory Replica	(Italy) Motoclub Alfieri	(Italy) Ugo Peila	4
KTM	450 Rally Factory Replica	(France) Happyness Racing JBS Moto	(France) Jean-Philippe Révolte	4
KTM	450 Rally Factory Replica		(Belgium) Benjamin Defrère	4
KTM	450 Rally Factory Replica		(Croatia) Darko Marasović	5
KTM	450 Rally Replica	Adventure Team Latvia	(Latvia) Sandijs Hāns	2
KTM	450 Rally Replica	(Netherlands) BAS Dakar KTM Racing Team	(United States) Mason Klein	4
KTM	450 Rally Replica	(Netherlands) BAS Dakar KTM Racing Team	(Germany) Mike Wiedemann	4
KTM	450 Rally Replica	(Netherlands) BAS Dakar KTM Racing Team	(Belgium) Mathieu Liebaert	4
KTM	450 Rally Replica	(Netherlands) BAS Dakar KTM Racing Team	(South Africa) Kirsten Landman	4
KTM	450 Rally Replica	(France) LG Rally Team	(France) Julien Jagu	4
KTM	450 Rally Replica		(Italy) Lorenzo Fanottoli	4
KTM	450 Rally Replica	(France) Team Esprit KTM	(France) Benjamin Melot	4
KTM	450 Rally Replica	Morocco Racing Team	(Morocco) Harite Gabari	4
KTM	450 Rally Replica	Morocco Racing Team	(Morocco) Ali Oukerbouch	4
KTM	450 Rally Replica	Morocco Racing Team	(Morocco) Mohamed Aoulad Ali	4
KTM	450 Rally Replica	(Spain) TwinTrail Racing Team	(Spain) Isaac Feliu	4
KTM	450 Rally Replica	(Italy) Team Puocci	(Italy) Francesco Puocci	4
KTM	450 Rally Replica		(France) Paul Costes	4
KTM	450 Rally Replica	(Slovakia) Norwit Racing	(Slovakia) Martin Benko	4
KTM	450 Rally Replica	(Spain) XRaids Experience Team	(Spain) Sandra Gómez	4
KTM	450 Rally Replica	Enduro Greece Rally Adventure Team	(Greece) Vasilis Boudros	4
KTM	450 Rally Replica	Enduro Greece Rally Adventure Team	(United Kingdom) Richard Kaye	4
KTM	450 Rally Replica		(France) Adrien Costes	4
KTM	450 Rally Replica	(France) Nomade Racing	(France) Rodolphe De Palmas	4
KTM	450 Rally Replica	(Italy) Yaya Events	(Italy) Iader Giraldi	4
KTM	450 Rally Replica	(Spain) Club Aventura Touareg	(Spain) Francisco García	4
KTM	450 Rally Replica	(Spain) Club Aventura Touareg	(Israel) Gad Nachmani	4
KTM	450 Rally Replica	(France) Team Baïnes Rally	(France) Julien Escande	4
KTM	450 Rally Replica	(Poland) Duust Rally Team	(Denmark) Thomas Kongshøj	5
KTM	450 Rally	(Italy) McDonald's Rally Team	(Italy) Aldo Winkler	2
KTM	450 Rally	(Italy) McDonald's Rally Team	(Italy) Andrea Winkler	2
KTM	450 Rally	(Portugal) Team Bianchi Prata	(Mozambique) Paulo Oliveira	4
KTM	450 Rally	(France) Nomade Racing	(France) Mathieu Troquier	4
KTM	450 Rally	(France) Nomade Racing	(France) Samuel Fremy	4
KTM	450 Rally	(Spain) TwinTrail Racing Team	(Spain) Carlos Falcon	4
KTM	450 Rally	(Italy) Terre Rosse	(Italy) Domenico Cipollone	4
KTM	450 Rally	(France) Team Dumontier Racing	(France) Edouard Leconte	4
KTM	450 Rally	(France) Happyness Racing JBS Moto	(France) David Gaits	4
KTM	450 Rally		(France) Dominique Cizeau	4
KTM	450 Rally	(Switzerland) Nomadas Adventure	(Germany) Jasmin Riccius	4
KTM	450 Rally	(Switzerland) Nomadas Adventure	(Mexico) Juan Pablo Guillen	4
KTM	450 Rally	(Switzerland) Nomadas Adventure	(Mexico) Antonio Guillen	4
KTM	450 Rally		(Italy) Giuseppe Pozzo	4
KTM	450 Rally		(France) Jean-François Forca	4
KTM	450 EXC Rally	(France) Universal Ride	(France) Jerome Bas	4
KTM	KTM 450 EXC-F	(Belarus) Lianiova 33 Team	(Belarus) Anastasia Lianiova	2
KTM	KTM 450 EXC-F	(Spain) Club Aventura Touareg	(Italy) Fabio Lottero	4
KTM	KTM 450 EXC-F	(Spain) Club Aventura Touareg	(Spain) Bernardo Ramírez	4
KTM	KTM 450 EXC-F	(Spain) Club Aventura Touareg	(Spain) Gines Belzunces	4
KTM	KTM 450 EXC-F		(France) Michael Jacobi	4
KTM	KTM 450 EXC-F		(Belgium) Mostapha Khottoul	4
KTM	KTM 450 EXC-F		(United Kingdom) Makis Rees-Stavros	5
Yamaha	WR 450	Team Mongolia #1	(Mongolia) Turbat Purevbat	2
Yamaha	WR 450	(Brazil) Yamaha IMS Rally Team	(Brazil) Tulio Malta	3
Yamaha	WR 450	(Brazil) Yamaha IMS Rally Team	(France) Adrien Metge	3
Yamaha	WR 450	(Brazil) Yamaha IMS Rally Team	(Brazil) Ricardo Martins	3
Yamaha	WR 450	(France) Team Outsider	(France) Fabien Domas	4
Yamaha	WR 450	(France) Team Outsider	(France) Pierre Boisset	4
Yamaha	WR 450	(France) Team Outsider	(France) Arnault Chardron	4
Yamaha	WR 450	(France) LM Dream Team	(France) Maxime Lonza	4
Yamaha	WR 450	(Italy) Maggi Moto Yamaha	(Italy) Luca Marinone	4
Yamaha	WR 450		(Germany) Tony Schattat	5
Quad World Cup Teams & Riders
Constructor	Bike	Team	Rider	Rounds
Yamaha	Raptor 700	(Poland) Sonik Team	(Poland) Rafał Sonik	All
Yamaha	Raptor 700		(Guatemala) Rodolfo Guillioli	1
Yamaha	Raptor 700	(Argentina) Bianchini Rally	(Argentina) Manuel Andújar	1, 3–5
Yamaha	Raptor 700	(Czech Republic) Story Racing S.R.O.	(Czech Republic) Tomáš Kubiena	4
Yamaha	Raptor 700	(Czech Republic) Story Racing S.R.O.	(Lithuania) Laisvydas Kancius	4
Yamaha	Raptor 700	(France) Yamaha Racing - SMX - Drag'on	(France) Alexandre Giroud	4
Yamaha	Raptor 700	(France) SMX Racing	(France) Romain Dutu	4
Yamaha	Raptor 700	(France) SMX Racing	(France) Jérôme Connart	4
Yamaha	Raptor 700	(France) Drag'on Rally Team	(France) Vincent Padrona	4
Yamaha	YFM 700R SE	Mari Team	Aleksandr Maksimov	1–2, 4
Yamaha	YFM 700R	(Slovakia) Varga Motorsport Team	(Slovakia) Juraj Varga	4
Yamaha	YFZ 450R		(United Arab Emirates) Abdulaziz Ahli	5
SSV World Cup Teams & Riders
Constructor	Bike	Team	Riders	Rounds
Can-Am	Maverick X3		(Israel) Roy Bartov (Israel) Guy Biton	5
Can-Am	Maverick X3		(Israel) Tal Galimidi (Israel) David Galimidi	5
Polaris	Turbo S	(Brazil) Torres Racing	(Brazil) Thiago Torres (Brazil) Eduardo Shiga	3
Polaris	Turbo S	(Brazil) Torres Racing	(Brazil) Leandro Torres (Brazil) João Arena	3

== Results ==
=== Motorbikes ===
Round	Rally name	Podium finishers			
Round	Rally name	Rank	Rider	Bike	Time
1	Rally Kazakhstan	1	(Botswana) Ross Branch	Yamaha WRF450	14:39:02
1	Rally Kazakhstan	2	(Austria) Matthias Walkner	KTM 450 Rally Factory Replica	14:44:09
1	Rally Kazakhstan	3	(France) Adrien Van Beveren	Yamaha WRF450	14:49:18
2	(Russia) (Mongolia) Silk Way Rally	1	(Austria) Matthias Walkner	KTM 450 Rally Factory Replica	6:19:18
2	(Russia) (Mongolia) Silk Way Rally	2	(United States) Skyler Howes	Husqvarna 450 Rally Factory Replica	6:25:38
2	(Russia) (Mongolia) Silk Way Rally	3	(Argentina) Franco Caimi	Hero 450 Rally	6:25:44
3	(Brazil) Rally dos Sertões	1	(France) Adrien Metge	Yamaha WR450F	30:06:12
3	(Brazil) Rally dos Sertões	2	(Brazil) Jean Azevedo	Honda CRF450 RX	30:22:40
3	(Brazil) Rally dos Sertões	3	(Brazil) Julio Zavatti	Honda CRF450 RX	30:40:06
4	(Morocco) Rallye du Maroc	1	(Chile) Pablo Quintanilla	Honda CRF 450 Rally	16:26:51
4	(Morocco) Rallye du Maroc	2	(Austria) Matthias Walkner	KTM 450 Rally Factory Replica	16:28:50
4	(Morocco) Rallye du Maroc	3	(Australia) Daniel Sanders	Gas Gas RC 450F	16:32:18
5	(United Arab Emirates) Abu Dhabi Desert Challenge	1	(Austria) Matthias Walkner	KTM 450 Rally Factory Replica	17:38:40
5	(United Arab Emirates) Abu Dhabi Desert Challenge	2	(France) Adrien Van Beveren	Yamaha WRF450	17:43:12
5	(United Arab Emirates) Abu Dhabi Desert Challenge	3	(Portugal) Joaquim Rodrigues	Hero 450 Rally	18:14:06

=== Quads ===
Round	Rally name	Podium finishers			
Round	Rally name	Rank	Rider	Bike	Time
1	Rally Kazakhstan	1	(Argentina) Manuel Andújar	Yamaha Raptor 700	19:51:20
1	Rally Kazakhstan	2	(Poland) Rafał Sonik	Yamaha Raptor 700	20:21:15
1	Rally Kazakhstan	3	Aleksandr Maksimov	Yamaha YMF 700R SE	21:34:24
2	(Russia) (Mongolia) Silk Way Rally	1	Aleksandr Maksimov	Yamaha YMF 700R SE	8:15:59
2	(Russia) (Mongolia) Silk Way Rally	2	(Poland) Rafał Sonik	Yamaha Raptor 700	9:03:48
2	(Russia) (Mongolia) Silk Way Rally	3			
3	(Brazil) Rally dos Sertões	1	(Argentina) Manuel Andújar	Yamaha Raptor 700	29:46:19
3	(Brazil) Rally dos Sertões	2	(Poland) Rafał Sonik	Yamaha Raptor 700	31:54:42
3	(Brazil) Rally dos Sertões	3			
4	(Morocco) Rallye du Maroc	1	(Argentina) Manuel Andújar	Yamaha Raptor 700	20:43:20
4	(Morocco) Rallye du Maroc	2	Aleksandr Maksimov	Yamaha YMF 700R SE	21:13:34
4	(Morocco) Rallye du Maroc	3	(France) Alexandre Giroud	Yamaha Raptor 700	22:01:48
5	(United Arab Emirates) Abu Dhabi Desert Challenge	1	(United Arab Emirates) Abdulaziz Ahli	Yamaha YFZ450R	24:11:55
5	(United Arab Emirates) Abu Dhabi Desert Challenge	2	(Poland) Rafał Sonik	Yamaha Raptor 700	38:44:56
5	(United Arab Emirates) Abu Dhabi Desert Challenge	3	(Argentina) Manuel Andújar	Yamaha Raptor 700	51:21:21

== Championship standings ==
- Points for final positions were awarded as follows:

Position	1st	2nd	3rd	4th	5th	6th	7th	8th	9th	10th	11th	12th	13th	14th	15th+
Points	25	20	16	13	11	10	9	8	7	6	5	4	3	2	1

An FIM Rally (4 to 6 timed stages) will have a scoring coefficient of 1. An FIM Marathon Rally (more than 6 timed stages) will have a scoring coefficient of 1,5. The result will be multiplied by 1.5 and then rounded up.

Points for manufacturers were awarded by added the top two finishers of the respective manufacturer together from each event.

=== RallyGP World Championship: Riders and Manufacturers ===
In RallyGP, the final classification will be established on the basis of a rider's best four results, including at least one marathon rally.

Pos	Rider	Motorcycle	KAZ (Kazakhstan)	RUS (Russia)	BRA (Brazil)	MAR (Morocco)	UAE (United Arab Emirates)	Points	Best four
1	(Austria) Matthias Walkner	KTM	2	1		2	1	103	
2	(France) Adrien Van Beveren	Yamaha	3	6		5	2	62	
3	(Australia) Daniel Sanders	Gas Gas	4	4		3	12	53	
4	(Portugal) Joaquim Rodrigues	Hero	7	9		8	3	44	
5	(United States) Skyler Howes	Husqvarna	10	2		12		40	
6	(Brazil) Gregorio Caselani	Honda			1			38	
7	(Argentina) Luciano Benavides	Husqvarna	6	7		6		34	
8	(Argentina) Franco Caimi	Hero	8	3		24	Ret	33	
9	(United States) Andrew Short	Yamaha	5	8		9	13	33	
10	(Botswana) Ross Branch	Yamaha	1	Ret		25	14	28	
11	(Chile) Pablo Quintanilla	Honda				1		25	
12	(Germany) Sebastian Bühler	Hero	9	5		26	Ret	24	
13	(South Africa) Aaron Mare	KTM					4	13	
14	(United States) Ricky Brabec	Honda				4		13	
15	(Poland) Konrad Dąbrowski	KTM				22	5	12	
16	(United Arab Emirates) Sultan Al Balooshi	KTM					6	10	
17	(United Kingdom) David McBride	Husqvarna					7	9	
18	(Argentina) Kevin Benavides	KTM				7		9	
19	(Kuwait) Abdullah Al Shatti	KTM					8	8	
20	(United Kingdom) David Mabbs	KTM					9	7	
21	(Saudi Arabia) Mishal Alghuneim	KTM					10	6	
22	(Chile) José Ignacio Cornejo	Honda				10		6	
23	Anastasiya Nifontova	Husqvarna					11	5	
24	(Spain) Joan Barreda	Honda				11		5	
25	(Australia) Toby Price	KTM				13		3	
26	(France) Xavier de Soultrait	Husqvarna				14		2	
27	(Spain) Lorenzo Santolino	Sherco				15		1	
28	(Portugal) Antonio Maio	Yamaha				16		1	
29	(Bolivia) Daniel Nosiglia	KTM				17		1	
30	(Portugal) Rui Gonçalves	Sherco				18		1	
31	(Italy) Jacopo Cerutti	Husqvarna				19		1	
32	(India) Harith Noah	Sherco				20		1	
33	(France) Mathieu Doveze	KTM				21		1	
34	(Chile) Tomas De Gavardo	KTM				23		1	
	(Slovakia) Stefan Svitko	KTM				NC		0	
	(United Kingdom) Sam Sunderland	KTM	Ret			Ret		0	
	(Czech Republic) Milan Engel	KTM				Ret		0	
	(Italy) Maurizio Gerini	Husqvarna				Ret		0	
	(United Arab Emirates) Mohammed Al Balooshi	KTM					Ret	0	
Pos	Rider	Motorcycle	KAZ (Kazakhstan)	RUS (Russia)	BRA (Brazil)	MAR (Morocco)	UAE (United Arab Emirates)	Points	Best four

Pos	Manufacturer	KAZ (Kazakhstan)	RUS (Russia)	BRA (Brazil)	MAR (Morocco)	UAE (United Arab Emirates)	Points
1	(Austria) KTM	20	38		29	38	125
2	(Japan) Yamaha	41	27		18	23	109
3	(Austria) Husqvarna	16	44		14	14	88
4	(India) Hero	17	41		9	16	83
5	(Japan) Honda			38	38		76
6	(Austria) Gas Gas	13	20		16	4	53
7	(France) Sherco				2		2
Pos	Manufacturer	KAZ (Kazakhstan)	RUS (Russia)	BRA (Brazil)	MAR (Morocco)	UAE (United Arab Emirates)	Points

=== RallyGP Women's World Cup ===
Pos	Rider	Motorcycle	KAZ (Kazakhstan)	RUS (Russia)	BRA (Brazil)	MAR (Morocco)	UAE (United Arab Emirates)	Points	Best four
1	Anastasiya Nifontova	Husqvarna					1	25	
Pos	Rider	Motorcycle	KAZ (Kazakhstan)	RUS (Russia)	BRA (Brazil)	MAR (Morocco)	UAE (United Arab Emirates)	Points	Best four

=== RallyGP Junior World Cup ===
Pos	Rider	Motorcycle	KAZ (Kazakhstan)	RUS (Russia)	BRA (Brazil)	MAR (Morocco)	UAE (United Arab Emirates)	Points	Best four
1	(Poland) Konrad Dąbrowski	KTM				1	1	50	
2	(Chile) Tomas De Gavardo	KTM				2		20	
Pos	Rider	Motorcycle	KAZ (Kazakhstan)	RUS (Russia)	BRA (Brazil)	MAR (Morocco)	UAE (United Arab Emirates)	Points	Best four

=== RallyGP Veteran's Trophy ===
Pos	Rider	Motorcycle	KAZ (Kazakhstan)	RUS (Russia)	BRA (Brazil)	MAR (Morocco)	UAE (United Arab Emirates)	Points	Best four
1	(United Kingdom) David McBride	Husqvarna					1	25	
2	(United Kingdom) David Mabbs	KTM					2	20	
Pos	Rider	Motorcycle	KAZ (Kazakhstan)	RUS (Russia)	BRA (Brazil)	MAR (Morocco)	UAE (United Arab Emirates)	Points	Best four

=== Rally 2: Moto-Rally World Cup ===
Pos	Rider	Motorcycle	KAZ (Kazakhstan)	RUS (Russia)	BRA (Brazil)	MAR (Morocco)	UAE (United Arab Emirates)	Points
1	(Italy) Carlo Cabini	Honda	1	2		13		58
2	(France) Adrien Metge	Yamaha			1			38
3	(Mongolia) Murun Purevdorj	KTM		1				38
4	(Brazil) Jean Azevedo	Honda			2			30
5	(South Africa) Michael Docherty	Husqvarna					1	25
6	(United States) Mason Klein	KTM				1		25
7	(Brazil) Julio Zavatti	Honda			3			24
8	(Mongolia) Temuujin Ganzorig	KTM		3				24
9	(United States) Jacob Argubright	Husqvarna					2	20
10	(Italy) Paolo Lucci	Husqvarna				2		20
11	(Brazil) Tulio Malta	Yamaha			4			20
12	(Mongolia) Battur Baatar	KTM		4				20
13	(Mongolia) Ganzorig Chuluun	Husqvarna		5				17
14	(United Kingdom) Makis Rees-Stavros	KTM					3	16
15	(South Africa) Bradley Cox	KTM				3		16
16	(Italy) Andrea Winkler	KTM		6		44		16
17	(Latvia) Sandis Hāns	KTM		7				14
18	(Denmark) Thomas Kongshøj	KTM					4	13
19	(France) Benjamin Melot	KTM				4		13
20	(Italy) Massimo Camurri	KTM		8				12
21	(Croatia) Darko Marasović	KTM					5	11
22	(France) Julien Jagu	KTM				5		11
23	(Belarus) Anastasia Lianiova	KTM		9				11
24	(United Kingdom) Brett Hunt	Husqvarna					6	10
25	(Belgium) Jerome Martiny	Husqvarna				6		10
26	(Sweden) Tomas Kristoffersson	Husqvarna					7	9
27	(France) Romain Dumontier	Husqvarna				7		9
28	(Germany) Tony Schattat	Yamaha					8	8
29	(Italy) Leonardo Tonelli	Husqvarna				8		8
30	(France) Jerome Bas	KTM				9		7
31	(France) Jean-Loup Lepan	KTM				10		6
32	(Germany) Mike Wiedemann	KTM				11		5
33	(Netherlands) Wiljan Van Wikselaar	KTM				12		4
34	(Italy) Lorenzo Fanottoli	KTM				14		2
35	(Argentina) Diego Noras	Husqvarna				15		1
36	(Belgium) Mathieu Liebaert	KTM				16		1
37	(Morocco) Ali Oukerbouch	KTM				17		1
38	(Spain) Isaac Feliu	KTM				18		1
39	(Spain) Albert Martín	Husqvarna				19		1
40	(France) Martin Bonnet	Husqvarna				20		1
41	(South Africa) Kirsten Landman	KTM				21		1
42	(France) Mathieu Troquier	KTM				22		1
43	(Italy) Eufrasio Anghileri	Honda				23		1
44	(Slovakia) Martin Benko	KTM				24		1
45	(France) Pierre Peyrard	KTM				25		1
46	(Italy) Lorenzo Maestrami	KTM				26		1
47	(Spain) Sandra Gómez	KTM				27		1
48	(Spain) Carlos Falcon	KTM				28		1
49	(Greece) Vasilis Boudros	KTM				29		1
50	(France) Sébastien Herbet	Husqvarna				30		1
51	(Italy) Fabio Lottero	KTM				31		1
52	(Italy) Domenico Cipollone	KTM				32		1
53	(France) Adrien Costes	KTM				33		1
54	(France) Clément Razy	Husqvarna				34		1
55	(France) Edouard Leconte	KTM				35		1
56	(Mozambique) Paulo Oliveira	KTM				36		1
57	(Switzerland) Nicolas Monnin	Honda				37		1
58	(France) Fabien Domas	Yamaha				38		1
59	(France) Samuel Fremy	KTM				39		1
60	(France) Lois D'Abbadie	Husqvarna				40		1
61	(France) Julien Barthélémy	Honda				41		1
62	(France) Max Bianucci	Husqvarna				42		1
63	(Italy) Aldo Winkler	KTM		Ret		43		1
64	(France) Kévin Durand	Honda				45		1
65	(France) Rodolphe De Palmas	KTM				46		1
66	(France) Pierre Boisset	Yamaha				47		1
67	(France) Maxime Lonza	Yamaha				48		1
68	(Belgium) Walter Roelants	Husqvarna				49		1
69	(France) Arnault Chardron	Yamaha				50		1
70	(Italy) Ugo Peila	KTM				51		1
71	(France) David Gaits	KTM				52		1
72	(France) Dominique Cizeau	KTM				53		1
73	(Germany) Jasmin Riccius	KTM				54		1
74	(Italy) Giuseppe Pozzo	KTM				55		1
75	(Spain) Bernardo Ramírez	KTM				56		1
76	(Italy) Iader Giraldi	KTM				57		1
77	(France) Michael Jacobi	KTM				58		1
78	(Spain) Francisco García	KTM				59		1
79	(Mexico) Antonio Guillen	KTM				60		1
80	(Israel) Gad Nachmani	KTM				61		1
81	(Morocco) Harite Gabari	KTM				62		1
82	(France) Jean-Philippe Révolte	KTM				63		1
83	(Italy) Francesca Gasperi	Honda				64		1
84	(Spain) Gines Belzunces	KTM				65		1
85	(France) Guillaume Jaunin	Honda				66		1
	(France) Jean-François Forca	KTM				NC		0
	(Mongolia) Enkhsaruul Davaa	KTM		Ret				0
	(Mongolia) Turbat Purevbat	Yamaha		Ret				0
	(Brazil) Ricardo Martins	Yamaha			Ret			0
	(France) Camille Chapeliere	KTM				Ret		0
	(France) Bertrand Gavard	KTM				Ret		0
	(Portugal) Bruno Santos	Husqvarna				Ret		0
	(Italy) Francesco Puocci	KTM				Ret		0
	(United Kingdom) Richard Kaye	KTM				Ret		0
	(Belgium) Benjamin Defrère	KTM				Ret		0
	(Mexico) Juan Pablo Guillen	KTM				Ret		0
	(Morocco) Mohamed Aoulad Ali	KTM				Ret		0
	(Spain) Francisco Chana	Husqvarna				Ret		0
	(Spain) Herbert Kolling	Husqvarna				Ret		0
	(France) Paul Costes	KTM				Ret		0
	(France) Julien Escande	KTM				Ret		0
	(Italy) Luca Marinone	Yamaha				Ret		0
	(Belgium) Mostapha Khottoul	KTM				Ret		0
Pos	Rider	Motorcycle	KAZ (Kazakhstan)	RUS (Russia)	BRA (Brazil)	MAR (Morocco)	UAE (United Arab Emirates)	Points

=== Quads World Cup ===
Pos	Rider	Motorcycle	KAZ (Kazakhstan)	RUS (Russia)	BRA (Brazil)	MAR (Morocco)	UAE (United Arab Emirates)	Points
1	(Argentina) Manuel Andújar	Yamaha	1		1	1	3	104
2	(Poland) Rafał Sonik	Yamaha	2	2	2	6	2	80
3	Aleksandr Maksimov	Yamaha	3	1		2		74
4	(United Arab Emirates) Abdulaziz Ahli	Yamaha					1	25
5	(France) Alexandre Giroud	Yamaha				3		16
6	(Slovakia) Juraj Varga	Yamaha				4		13
7	(France) Jérôme Connart	Yamaha				5		11
	(Guatemala) Rodolfo Guillioli	Yamaha	Ret					0
	(Czech Republic) Tomáš Kubiena	Yamaha				Ret		0
	(France) Vincent Padrona	Yamaha				Ret		0
	(France) Romain Dutu	Yamaha				Ret		0
	(Lithuania) Laisvydas Kancius	Yamaha				Ret		0
Pos	Rider	Motorcycle	KAZ (Kazakhstan)	RUS (Russia)	BRA (Brazil)	MAR (Morocco)	UAE (United Arab Emirates)	Points

=== SSV World Cup ===
Pos	Rider	Motorcycle	KAZ (Kazakhstan)	RUS (Russia)	BRA (Brazil)	MAR (Morocco)	UAE (United Arab Emirates)	Points
1	(Brazil) Leandro Torres (Brazil) Joaõ Arena	Polaris			1			38
2	(Brazil) Thiago Torres (Brazil) Eduardo Shiga	Polaris			2			30
3	(Israel) Tal Galimidi (Israel) David Galimidi	Can-Am					1	25
4	(Israel) Roy Bartov (Israel) Guy Biton	Can-Am					2	20
Pos	Rider	Motorcycle	KAZ (Kazakhstan)	RUS (Russia)	BRA (Brazil)	MAR (Morocco)	UAE (United Arab Emirates)	Points
