= 2016 FIM Cross-Country Rallies World Championship =

2016 FIM Cross-Country Rallies World Championship
Previous:	2015	Next:	2017

The 2016 FIM Cross-Country Rallies World Championship season is the 14th season of the FIM Cross-Country Rallies World Championship.

== Calendar ==
The calendar for the 2016 season featured five rallies. Some of the rallies were also part of FIA Cross Country Rally World Cup.

Round	Dates	Rally name
1	2–7 April	(United Arab Emirates) Abu Dhabi Desert Challenge
2	17–22 April	(Qatar) Sealine Cross-Country Rally
3	2–7 June	(Italy) Sardegna Rally Race
4	28 August – 4 September	(Chile) Atacama Rally
5	1–7 October	(Morocco) Rallye OiLibya du Maroc

== Teams and riders ==
Constructor	Bike	Team	Rider	Rounds
Honda	Honda CRF450	(United Arab Emirates) Abu Dhabi Spirit Racing	(United Arab Emirates) Khalid Al-Falasi	1
Honda	Honda CRF450	(Russia) VVI Rally Team	(Slovakia) Ján Zaťko	1
Honda	Honda CRF450R	(Australia) CPW Motoparts	(Australia) Jacob Smith	1
Honda	Honda CRF 450 Rally	(Japan) Honda HRC Rally	(Argentina) Kevin Benavides	3–5
Honda	Honda CRF 450 Rally	(Japan) Honda HRC Rally	(Portugal) Paulo Gonçalves	4–5
Husqvarna	Husqvarna 450 Rally Factory	(Sweden) Rockstar Husqvarna Factory Racing Team	(Chile) Pablo Quintanilla	1–2, 4–5
Husqvarna	Husqvarna 450 Rally Factory	(Sweden) Rockstar Husqvarna Factory Racing Team	(France) Pierre Renet	1–2, 4–5
Husqvarna	Husqvarna 450 Rally Replica	(Netherlands) HT Husqvarna Rally Team	(Spain) Txomin Arana	1
Husqvarna	Husqvarna 450 Rally Replica	(Netherlands) HT Husqvarna Rally Team	(Netherlands) Arjan Bos	1
Husqvarna	Husqvarna 450 Rally Replica	(Netherlands) HT Husqvarna Rally Team	(Iceland) Joikef Sveinbjörnsson	1
Husqvarna	Husqvarna 450 Rally Replica	(Netherlands) HT Husqvarna Rally Team	(United Kingdom) David Thomas	1
Husqvarna	Husqvarna FC 450	(Kazakhstan) MobilEx Racing Team	(Kazakhstan) Yevgeniya Nesterová	1
Husqvarna	Husqvarna FE 450	(Australia) Scott Britnell	(Australia) Scott Britnell	1–2
KTM	KTM 450 EXC	(Qatar) Ahmed Fahad Alkuwari	(Qatar) Ahmed Fahad Alkuwari	2
KTM	KTM 450 Rally Factory	(Chile) José Ignacio Cornejo Florimo	(Chile) José Ignacio Cornejo Florimo	2
KTM	KTM 450 Rally Factory	(Austria) Red Bull KTM Rally Factory Racing Team (Austria) KTM Factory Racing	(Australia) Toby Price	1–2, 4–5
KTM	KTM 450 Rally Factory	(Austria) Red Bull KTM Rally Factory Racing Team (Austria) KTM Factory Racing	(Spain) Laia Sanz	1–2, 4
KTM	KTM 450 Rally Factory	(Austria) Red Bull KTM Rally Factory Racing Team (Austria) KTM Factory Racing	(United Kingdom) Sam Sunderland	1–2, 4–5
KTM	KTM 450 Rally Factory	(Austria) Red Bull KTM Rally Factory Racing Team (Austria) KTM Factory Racing	(Austria) Matthias Walkner	4–5
KTM	KTM 450 Rally Replica	(Romania) Autonet Motorcycle Team	(Romania) Emanuel Gyenes	1
KTM	KTM 450 Rally Replica	(United Arab Emirates) Crazy Camel Racing	(Italy) Carlo Seminara	1
KTM	KTM 450 Rally Replica	(Kuwait) Ibrahim Alrubaian	(Kuwait) Ibrahim Alrubaian	1
KTM	KTM 450 Rally Replica	(Chile) José Ignacio Cornejo Florimo	(Chile) José Ignacio Cornejo Florimo	1, 3–4
KTM	KTM 450 Rally Replica	(Bolivia) Juan Carlos Salvatierra	(Bolivia) Juan Carlos Salvatierra	2
KTM	KTM 450 Rally Replica	(United Kingdom) Kurt Burroughs	(United Kingdom) Kurt Burroughs	2
KTM	KTM 450 Rally Replica	(Czech Republic) Marek Podlipny	(Czech Republic) Marek Podlipny	1
KTM	KTM 450 Rally Replica	(Slovenia) Miran Stanovnik	(Slovenia) Miran Stanovnik	1
KTM	KTM 450 Rally Replica	(United Arab Emirates) Mohammed Al Balooshi	(United Arab Emirates) Mohammed Al Balooshi	1–2
KTM	KTM 450 Rally Replica	(Poland) Orlen Team	(Poland) Jakub Piątek	1–2, 5
KTM	KTM 450 Rally Replica	(Poland) Orlen Team	(Poland) Paweł Stasiaczek	1
KTM	KTM 450 Rally Replica	(Poland) Orlen Team	(Australia) Ben Young	1
KTM	KTM 450 Rally Replica	(Germany) Team Kaiser	(Germany) Stephan Preuss	1
KTM	KTM 450 Rally Replica	(Germany) Team Kaiser	(Germany) Thomas Preuss	1
KTM	KTM 450 Rally Replica	(Germany) Tony Schattat	(Germany) Tony Schattat	1
KTM	KTM 450 Rally Replica	(United Arab Emirates) Vendetta Racing UAE	(United Kingdom) David Mabbs	1
KTM	KTM 450 Rally Replica	(United Arab Emirates) Vendetta Racing UAE	(United Kingdom) David McBride	1
KTM	KTM 450 Rally Replica	(United Arab Emirates) Vendetta Racing UAE	(United Kingdom) Paul Middleton	1
KTM	KTM 450 Rally Replica	Slovakia Rally Team	(Slovakia) Stefan Svitko	5
KTM	KTM SXF 450	(Australia) Mark Davidson	(Australia) Mark Davidson	1
Sherco	Sherco 450 RTR	(France) Sherco TVS Rally Factory	(Spain) Juan Pedrero	3, 5
Sherco	Sherco 450 RTR	(France) Sherco TVS Rally Factory	(France) Adrien Metge	5
Sherco	Sherco 450 RTR	(France) Sherco TVS Rally Factory	(India) Aravind Prabhakar	5
Yamaha	Yamaha WR450F	(United Arab Emirates) Crazy Camel Racing	(Australia) Rodney Faggoter	1
Yamaha	Yamaha WR450F	(Poland) Sonik Team	(Spain) Julián Villarrubia	1
Yamaha	Yamaha WR450F	(Japan) Yamalube Yamaha Official Rally Team	(Portugal) Hélder Rodrigues	1–3, 5
Yamaha	Yamaha WR450F	(Japan) Yamalube Yamaha Official Rally Team	(Netherlands) Adrien van Beveren	2–3, 5
Yamaha	Yamaha WR450F	(Japan) Yamalube Yamaha Official Rally Team	(Italy) Alessandro Botturi	3, 5

== Results ==
Round	Rally name	Podium finishers			
Round	Rally name	Rank	Rider	Bike	Time
1	(United Arab Emirates) Abu Dhabi Desert Challenge	1	(Australia) Toby Price	KTM 450 Rally Factory	18:18:24
1	(United Arab Emirates) Abu Dhabi Desert Challenge	2	(United Kingdom) Sam Sunderland	KTM 450 Rally Factory	18:20:35
1	(United Arab Emirates) Abu Dhabi Desert Challenge	3	(Chile) Pablo Quintanilla	Husqvarna 450 Rally Factory	18:21:47
2	(Qatar) Sealine Cross-Country Rally	1	(United Kingdom) Sam Sunderland	KTM 450 Rally Factory	19:14:07
2	(Qatar) Sealine Cross-Country Rally	2	(Chile) Pablo Quintanilla	Husqvarna 450 Rally Factory	19:23:45
2	(Qatar) Sealine Cross-Country Rally	3	(Portugal) Hélder Rodrigues	Yamaha WR450F	19:44:53
3	(Italy) Sardegna Rally Race	1	(Spain) Juan Pedrero	Sherco 450	14:31:15
3	(Italy) Sardegna Rally Race	2	(France) Xavier de Soultrait	Yamaha WR450F	14:31:58
3	(Italy) Sardegna Rally Race	3	(Spain) Armand Monleón	Husqvarna 450	14:33:32
4	(Chile) Atacama Rally	1	(Chile) Pablo Quintanilla	Husqvarna 450	11:48:38
4	(Chile) Atacama Rally	2	(Australia) Toby Price	KTM 450 Rally Factory	11:49:07
4	(Chile) Atacama Rally	3	(Argentina) Kevin Benavides	Honda 450	11:58:13
5	(Morocco) Rallye OiLibya du Maroc	1	(Australia) Toby Price	KTM 450 Rally Factory	13:06:35
5	(Morocco) Rallye OiLibya du Maroc	2	(United Kingdom) Sam Sunderland	KTM 450 Rally Factory	13:14:19
5	(Morocco) Rallye OiLibya du Maroc	3	(Chile) Pablo Quintanilla	Husqvarna 450	13:23:37

== Championship standings ==
=== Riders' championship ===
Pos	Rider	ABU (United Arab Emirates)	QAT (Qatar)	SAR (Italy)	CHL (Chile)	MAR (Morocco)	Points
1	(Chile) Pablo Quintanilla	3^{20}	2^{26}		1^{31}	3^{19}	96
2	(United Kingdom) Sam Sunderland	2^{23}	1^{29}		5^{14}	2^{23}	89
3	(Australia) Toby Price	1^{30}	Ret^{3}		2^{24}	1^{30}	87
4	(Portugal) Hélder Rodrigues	21^{5}	3^{19}	8^{11}		4^{16}	51
5	(France) Pierre Renet	5^{15}	5^{14}		9^{10}	9^{10}	49
6	(Spain) Juan Pedrero			1^{30}		8^{11}	41
7	(Chile) José Cornejo	7^{12}	9^{13}	15^{4}	8^{11}		40
8	(France) Xavier De Soultrait			2^{24}		5^{14}	38
9	(Argentina) Kevin Benavides			6^{13}	3^{19}	Ret^{4}	36
10	(France) Adrien van Beveren		Ret^{3}	7^{12}		6^{13}	28
11	(Austria) Matthias Walkner				6^{13}	7^{13}	26
12	(Spain) Laia Sanz	6^{13}	Ret^{3}		10^{9}		25
13	(Italy) Alessandro Botturi			4^{18}		38^{4}	22
14	(Portugal) Paulo Gonçalves				4^{17}	Ret^{4}	21
15	(Spain) Armand Monleon			3^{19}			19
16	(United Arab Emirates) Mohammed Al Balooshi	4^{16}	Ret^{3}				19
17	(Poland) Jakub Piątek	8^{11}	Ret^{3}			37^{4}	18
18	(Australia) Scott Britnell	17^{4}	8^{13}				17
19	(Bolivia) Juan Carlos Salvatierra		4^{16}				16
20	(United States) Ricky Brabec				7^{12}	35^{4}	16
Pos	Rider	ABU (United Arab Emirates)	QAT (Qatar)	SAR (Italy)	CHL (Chile)	MAR (Morocco)	Points
