= 2015 FIM Cross-Country Rallies World Championship =

2015 FIM Cross-Country Rallies World Championship
Previous:	2014	Next:	2016

The 2015 FIM Cross-Country Rallies World Championship season was the 13th season of the FIM Cross-Country Rallies World Championship.

Austria's Matthias Walkner, riding a KTM, was the winner of the championship by 7 points ahead of Great Britain's Sam Sunderland, who also rode a KTM. Walkner won the season's fourth event, the Sardegna Rally Race, while Sunderland was the winner of the final event, the Rallye OiLibya du Maroc. Third place in the championship, 11 points further behind Sunderland, went to the best-placed Honda rider, Paulo Gonçalves. Defending champion Marc Coma finished fourth, after announcing his retirement midway through the season – he was the only rider to win more than one event, winning the first two events at the Abu Dhabi Desert Challenge and the Sealine Cross-Country Rally. Two other riders won races in 2015; Pablo Quintanilla won his home event at the Atacama Rally, and Poland's Jakub Piątek won the Rallye des Pharaons.

== Calendar ==
The calendar for the 2015 season featured six rallies. Some of the rallies were also part of FIA Cross Country Rally World Cup. The Atacama Rally replaced Rallye dos Sertões for the 2015 season.

Round	Dates	Rally name
1	27 March – 2 April	(United Arab Emirates) Abu Dhabi Desert Challenge
2	20–24 April	(Qatar) Sealine Cross-Country Rally
3	12–16 May	(Egypt) Rallye des Pharaons
4	6–11 June	(Italy) Sardegna Rally Race
5	30 August – 5 September	(Chile) Atacama Rally
6	3–9 October	(Morocco) Rallye OiLibya du Maroc

== Results ==
Round	Rally name	Podium finishers			
Round	Rally name	Rank	Rider	Bike	Time
1	(United Arab Emirates) Abu Dhabi Desert Challenge	1	(Spain) Marc Coma	KTM 450 Rally	14:49:05
1	(United Arab Emirates) Abu Dhabi Desert Challenge	2	(United Kingdom) Sam Sunderland	KTM 450 Rally	15:01:00
1	(United Arab Emirates) Abu Dhabi Desert Challenge	3	(Chile) Pablo Quintanilla	KTM 450 Rally	15:09:21
2	(Qatar) Sealine Cross-Country Rally	1	(Spain) Marc Coma	KTM 450 Rally	19:56:48
2	(Qatar) Sealine Cross-Country Rally	2	(Spain) Joan Barreda	Honda CRF 450 Rally	20:01:28
2	(Qatar) Sealine Cross-Country Rally	3	(Portugal) Paulo Gonçalves	Honda CRF 450 Rally	20:03:21
3	(Egypt) Rallye des Pharaons	1	(Poland) Jakub Piątek	KTM 450 Rally	17:44:59
3	(Egypt) Rallye des Pharaons	2	(Bolivia) Juan Carlos Salvatierra	KTM 450 Rally	17:48:18
3	(Egypt) Rallye des Pharaons	3	(United Arab Emirates) Mohammed Balooshi	KTM 450 Rally	19:21:03
4	(Italy) Sardegna Rally Race	1	(Austria) Matthias Walkner	KTM 450 Rally	16:30:26
4	(Italy) Sardegna Rally Race	2	(Spain) Armand Monleón	KTM 450 Rally	16:32:59
4	(Italy) Sardegna Rally Race	3	(Portugal) Hélder Rodrigues	Yamaha WR450F	16:35:32
5	(Chile) Atacama Rally	1	(Chile) Pablo Quintanilla	KTM 450 Rally	11:07:34
5	(Chile) Atacama Rally	2	(Austria) Matthias Walkner	KTM 450 Rally	11:10:23
5	(Chile) Atacama Rally	3	(United Kingdom) Sam Sunderland	KTM 450 Rally	11:10:48
6	(Morocco) Rallye OiLibya du Maroc	1	(United Kingdom) Sam Sunderland	KTM 450 Rally	15:38:00
6	(Morocco) Rallye OiLibya du Maroc	2	(Austria) Matthias Walkner	KTM 450 Rally	15:38:34
6	(Morocco) Rallye OiLibya du Maroc	3	(Portugal) Paulo Gonçalves	Honda CRF 450 Rally	16:07:08

== Championship standings ==
=== Riders' championship ===
- Points for final positions were awarded as follows:

Position	1st	2nd	3rd	4th	5th	6th	7th	8th	9th	10th	11th	12th	13th	14th	15th+
Points	20	17	15	13	11	10	9	8	7	6	5	4	3	2	1

Pos	Rider	ABU (United Arab Emirates)	QAT (Qatar)	PHA (Egypt)	SAR (Italy)	CHL (Chile)	MAR (Morocco)	Points
1	(Austria) Matthias Walkner	31^{4}	7^{12}		1^{28}	2^{23}	2^{23}	90
2	(United Kingdom) Sam Sunderland	2^{23}	6^{13}			3^{19}	1^{28}	83
3	(Portugal) Paulo Gonçalves	30^{4}	3^{19}		4^{16}	5^{14}	3^{19}	72
4	(Spain) Marc Coma	1^{28}	1^{28}		5^{14}			70
5	(Chile) Pablo Quintanilla	3^{19}	5^{14}		17^{4}	1^{28}	Ret^{3}	68
6	(United Arab Emirates) Mohammed Al Balooshi	6^{13}	10^{9}	3^{19}		8^{11}	Ret^{3}	55
7	(Poland) Jakub Piątek	34^{4}	9^{10}	1^{28}	59^{4}		12^{8}	54
8	(Spain) Jordi Viladoms		4^{16}		7^{12}	4^{16}	Ret^{3}	47
9	(Portugal) Rubén Faria	4^{16}	Ret^{3}		8^{11}		5^{14}	44
10	(Spain) Armand Monleón	38^{3}	8^{11}		2^{23}			37

- A total of 152 riders scored championship points.
