= 2017 FIM Cross-Country Rallies World Championship =

2017 FIM Cross-Country Rallies World Championship
Previous:	2016	Next:	2018

The 2017 FIM Cross-Country Rallies World Championship season is the 15th season of the FIM Cross-Country Rallies World Championship. Pablo Quintanilla won his second world title.

== Calendar ==
The calendar for the 2017 season featured five rallies.

Round	Dates	Rally name
1	1–6 April	(United Arab Emirates) Abu Dhabi Desert Challenge
2	17–22 April	Qatar Cross-Country Rally
3	12–18 August	(Chile) Atacama Rally
4	25–31 August	(Argentina) Desafio Ruta 40
5	4–10 October	(Morocco) Rallye OiLibya du Maroc

== Results ==
Round	Rally name	Podium finishers			
Round	Rally name	Rank	Rider	Bike	Time
1	(United Arab Emirates) Abu Dhabi Desert Challenge	1	(United Kingdom) Sam Sunderland	KTM 450 Rally	18:14:32
1	(United Arab Emirates) Abu Dhabi Desert Challenge	2	(Chile) Pablo Quintanilla	Husqvarna FR450	18:20:46
1	(United Arab Emirates) Abu Dhabi Desert Challenge	3	(Austria) Matthias Walkner	KTM 450 Rally	18:22:48
2	Qatar Cross-Country Rally	1	(United Kingdom) Sam Sunderland	KTM 450 Rally	15:50:18
2	Qatar Cross-Country Rally	2	(Portugal) Paulo Gonçalves	Honda CRF 450 Rally	15:58:00
2	Qatar Cross-Country Rally	3	(Austria) Matthias Walkner	KTM 450 Rally	16:03:29
3	(Chile) Atacama Rally	1	(Chile) Pablo Quintanilla	Husqvarna FR450	12:53:49
3	(Chile) Atacama Rally	2	(Argentina) Kevin Benavides	Honda CRF 450 Rally	12:56:12
3	(Chile) Atacama Rally	3	(Portugal) Paulo Gonçalves	Honda CRF 450 Rally	13:05:40
4	(Argentina) Desafio Ruta 40	1	(Argentina) Kevin Benavides	Honda CRF 450 Rally	19:13:24
4	(Argentina) Desafio Ruta 40	2	(Portugal) Paulo Gonçalves	Honda CRF 450 Rally	19:26:16
4	(Argentina) Desafio Ruta 40	3	(France) Xavier De Soultrait	Yamaha WR450F	19:54:14
6	(Morocco) Rallye OiLibya du Maroc	1	(Austria) Matthias Walkner	KTM 450 Rally	10:03:49
6	(Morocco) Rallye OiLibya du Maroc	2	(Argentina) Kevin Benavides	Honda CRF 450 Rally	10:17:31
6	(Morocco) Rallye OiLibya du Maroc	3	(United States) Ricky Brabec	Honda CRF 450 Rally	10:20:47

== Championship standings ==
- Points for final positions were awarded as follows:

Position	1st	2nd	3rd	4th	5th	6th	7th	8th	9th	10th	11th	12th	13th	14th	15th+
Points	25	20	16	13	11	10	9	8	7	6	5	4	3	2	1

- All riders were awarded 3 bonus points for taking part in the first stage (or the prologue) of an event. No rider was required to be classified in order to score these bonus points.
- Also, 1 bonus point was awarded for each stage win (except prologue).

=== Motorbike riders' world championship ===
Pos	Rider	ABU (United Arab Emirates)	QAT (Qatar)	CHL (Chile)	ARG (Argentina)	MAR (Morocco)	Points
1	(Chile) Pablo Quintanilla	2^{23}	4^{17}	1^{31}	4^{16}	7^{13}	100
2	(Argentina) Kevin Benavides	16^{5}	5^{14}	2^{25}	1^{30}	2^{23}	97
3	(Austria) Matthias Walkner	3^{19}	3^{20}	6^{13}	5^{14}	1^{29}	95
4	(Portugal) Paulo Gonçalves	4^{16}	2^{23}	3^{19}	2^{24}	Ret^{3}	85
5	(United Kingdom) Sam Sunderland	1^{31}	1^{30}	4^{16}	Ret^{4}	Ret^{3}	84
6	(France) Antoine Meo	6^{13}	7^{12}			4^{16}	41
7	(France) Xavier De Soultrait			5^{14}	3^{19}		33
8	(France) Pierre Alexandre Renet	5^{15}	6^{13}	Ret^{3}			31
9	(France) Adrien Van Beveren			8^{11}	9^{10}	18^{6}	27
10	(United Kingdom) David McBride	10^{9}	11^{8}	12^{7}		Ret^{3}	27
Pos	Rider	ABU (United Arab Emirates)	QAT (Qatar)	CHL (Chile)	ARG (Argentina)	MAR (Morocco)	Points

- A total of 67 riders scored championship points.

=== Motorbike manufacturers' world championship ===
Pos	Rider	ABU (United Arab Emirates)	QAT (Qatar)	CHL (Chile)	ARG (Argentina)	MAR (Morocco)	Points
1	(Austria) KTM	50	50	29	26	45	200
2	(Japan) Honda	21	37	44	54	43	199
3	(Austria) Husqvarna	38	30	34	16	17	135
4	(Japan) Yamaha	5		25	29	13	72
5	(France) Sherco					27	27
Pos	Rider	ABU (United Arab Emirates)	QAT (Qatar)	CHL (Chile)	ARG (Argentina)	MAR (Morocco)	Points
