= 2014 FIM Cross-Country Rallies World Championship =

2014 FIM Cross-Country Rallies World Championship
Previous:	2013	Next:	2015

The 2014 FIM Cross-Country Rallies World Championship season was the 12th season of the FIM Cross-Country Rallies World Championship. The Spanish Marc Coma won his second title, after the last event.

== Calendar ==
The calendar for the 2014 season featured six rallies. Some of the rallies were also part of FIA Cross Country Rally World Cup.

Round	Dates	Rally name
1	4–10 April	(United Arab Emirates) Abu Dhabi Desert Challenge
2	20–25 April	(Qatar) Sealine Cross-Country Rally
3	18–25 May	(Egypt) Rallye des Pharaons
4	7–12 June	(Italy) Sardegna Rally Race
5	21–30 August	(Brazil) Rallye dos Sertões
6	3–9 October	(Morocco) OiLibya Rally

The third event, Rallye des Pharaons after being cancelled in 2013, in 2014 the official teams refused to take part in the race claiming security still remaining after Egyptian Revolution of 2011.

== Results ==
Round	Rally name	Podium finishers			
Round	Rally name	Rank	Driver	Bike	Time
1	(United Arab Emirates) Abu Dhabi Desert Challenge	1	(Portugal) Paulo Gonçalves	Honda	16h57m47s
1	(United Arab Emirates) Abu Dhabi Desert Challenge	2	(Spain) Marc Coma	KTM	16h58m07s
1	(United Arab Emirates) Abu Dhabi Desert Challenge	3	(Spain) Joan Barreda Bort	Honda	17h06m31s
2	(Qatar) Sealine Cross-Country Rally	1	(Spain) Joan Barreda Bort	Honda	20h28m46s
2	(Qatar) Sealine Cross-Country Rally	2	(Spain) Marc Coma	KTM	20h30m09s
2	(Qatar) Sealine Cross-Country Rally	3	(Portugal) Hélder Rodrigues	Honda	20h30m36s
3	(Egypt) Rallye des Pharaons	1	(Bolivia) Juan Carlos Salvatierra	Speedbrain	19h20m47s
3	(Egypt) Rallye des Pharaons	2	(Venezuela) Nicolás Cardona	Yamaha	20h04m48s
3	(Egypt) Rallye des Pharaons	3	(Venezuela) Rafael Eraso	Yamaha	21h36m10s
4	(Italy) Sardegna Rally Race	1	(Italy) Alessandro Botturi	Husqvarna	15h11m05s
4	(Italy) Sardegna Rally Race	2	(Spain) Marc Coma	KTM	15h18m49s
4	(Italy) Sardegna Rally Race	3	(Spain) Gerard Farres	Gas Gas	15h23m26s
5	(Brazil) Rallye dos Sertões	1	(Spain) Marc Coma	KTM	18h21m51s
5	(Brazil) Rallye dos Sertões	2	(Portugal) Paulo Gonçalves	Honda	18h25m14s
5	(Brazil) Rallye dos Sertões	3	(Brazil) Jean Azevedo	Honda	18h35m56s
6	(Morocco) OiLibya Rally	1	(Spain) Marc Coma	KTM	17h37m58s
6	(Morocco) OiLibya Rally	2	(United Kingdom) Sam Sunderland	KTM	17h43m26s
6	(Morocco) OiLibya Rally	3	(Portugal) Hélder Rodrigues	Honda	17h50m11s

== Drivers' Championship ==
- Points for final position are awarded as in following table

Position	1st	2nd	3rd	4th	5th	6th	7th	8th	9th	10th	11th	12th	13th	14th	rest
Points	20	17	15	13	11	10	9	8	7	6	5	4	3	2	1

- Bonus Points: All riders taking the start of the first stage of the final event, inscribed in the calendar of the FIM Cross Country Rally World Championship, will be awarded 10 points.

Pos	Driver	ABU (United Arab Emirates)	QAT (Qatar)	PHA (Egypt)	SAR (Italy)	SER (Brazil)	MAR (Morocco)	Points
1	(Spain) Marc Coma	2^{17}	2^{17}		2^{17}	1^{20}	1^{30}	101
2	(Portugal) Paulo Gonçalves	1^{20}	5^{11}		4^{13}	2^{17}	Ret^{10}	71
3	(Spain) Joan Barreda Bort	3^{15}	1^{20}		6^{10}		4^{23}	68
4	(Portugal) Hélder Rodrigues	7^{9}	3^{15}			4^{13}	3^{25}	62
5	(Spain) Jordi Viladoms	4^{13}	4^{13}			5^{11}	6^{20}	57
6	(Portugal) Ruben Faria		9^{7}		7^{9}	8^{8}	5^{21}	45
7	(United Kingdom) Sam Sunderland					6^{10}	2^{27}	37
8	(Poland) Jakub Piątek	9^{7}	7^{9}		17^{1}		14^{12}	29
9	(India) Santosh Chunchungguppes	10^{6}	8^{8}				22^{11}	25
10	(Bolivia) Juan Carlos Salvatierra			1^{20}	19^{1}			21

127 Drivers have been classified
