= 2019 FIM Cross-Country Rallies World Championship =

2019 FIM Cross-Country Rallies World Championship
Previous:	2018	Next:	2020

The 2019 FIM Cross-Country Rallies World Championship was the 17th season of the FIM Cross-Country Rallies World Championship, an international rally raid competition for motorbikes and quads.

== Calendar ==
The calendar for the 2019 season featured four long-distance rally raid events; including one marathon event in the Silk Way Rally. Some of the events were also part of 2019 FIA World Cup for Cross-Country Rallies.

Round	Dates	Rally name
1	30 March – 4 April	(United Arab Emirates) Abu Dhabi Desert Challenge
2	6–16 July	(Russia) (Mongolia) (China) Silk Way Rally
3	1–7 September	(Chile) Atacama Rally
4	3–9 October	(Morocco) Rallye du Maroc

== Teams and riders ==
Constructor	Bike	Team	Rider	Rounds
Can-Am	Can-Am 850 Renegade	(Poland) Arkadiusz Lindner	(Poland) Arkadiusz Lindner	1–2
Hero	Hero 450 Rally	(India) Hero Motosports Team Rally	(Portugal) Paulo Gonçalves	2, 4
Hero	Hero 450 Rally	(India) Hero Motosports Team Rally	(Spain) Oriol Mena	2
Hero	Hero 450 Rally	(India) Hero Motosports Team Rally	(Portugal) Joaquim Rodrigues	4
Hero	Hero 450 Rally	(India) Hero Motosports Team Rally	(India) CS Santosh	4
Honda	Honda CRF 450 Rally	(Japan) Monster Energy Honda Team	(Argentina) Kevin Benavides	All
Honda	Honda CRF 450 Rally	(Japan) Monster Energy Honda Team	(Chile) Jose Cornejo	All
Honda	Honda CRF 450 Rally	(Japan) Monster Energy Honda Team	(Spain) Joan Barreda Bort	All
Honda	Honda CRF 450 Rally	(Japan) Monster Energy Honda Team	(United States) Ricky Brabec	3–4
Honda	Honda CRF 450 Rally	(Japan) Monster Energy Honda Team	(South Africa) Aaron Mare	3–4
Honda	Honda CRF 450 Rally	(Japan) Honda MEC Team	(Bolivia) Daniel Nosiglia	4
Honda	Honda 700 TRX	(Spain) Jaimie Esparago	(Spain) Jaimie Esparago	1
Honda	Honda Ridgeline	(Peru) Gianna Velarde	(Peru) Gianna Velarde	3
Husqvarna	Husqvarna F 450 RR	(Russia) Anastasiya Nifontova	(Russia) Anastasiya Nifontova	1–2
Husqvarna	Husqvarna F 450 RR	(United Arab Emirates) SRG - Motorsports	(Kuwait) Abdullah Al Shatti	1
Husqvarna	Husqvarna F 450 RR	(United Arab Emirates) SRG - Motorsports	(South Africa) Mark Ackerman	1
Husqvarna	Husqvarna F 450 RR	(United Arab Emirates) SRG - Motorsports	(United Kingdom) Ryan Blair	1
Husqvarna	Husqvarna F 450 RR	(United Arab Emirates) SRG - Motorsports	(United Kingdom) Andrew Haddon	1
Husqvarna	Husqvarna F 450 RR	(Netherlands) HT Rally Raid	(Bahrain) Abdulaziz Al Khalifa	4
Husqvarna	Husqvarna F 450 RR	(Netherlands) HT Rally Raid	(Netherlands) Floor Maten	4
Husqvarna	Husqvarna F 450 RR	(Netherlands) HT Rally Raid	(Bahrain) Salman Mohamed Humood Farhan	4
Husqvarna	Husqvarna FR450	(Austria) Rockstar Energy Husqvarna Factory Racing	(United States) Andrew Short	All
Husqvarna	Husqvarna FR450	(Austria) Rockstar Energy Husqvarna Factory Racing	(Chile) Pablo Quintanilla	3–4
Husqvarna	Husqvarna FR450	(Poland) Orlen Team	(Poland) Adam Tomiczek	2, 4
Husqvarna	Husqvarna FR450	(Poland) Orlen Team	(Poland) Maciej Giemza	2, 4
Husqvarna	Husqvarna FR450	(Mongolia) Boldbaatar Damdinkhorloo	(Mongolia) Boldbaatar Damdinkhorloo	2
Husqvarna	Husqvarna FE 450	(United Arab Emirates) Mark Davidson	(United Arab Emirates) Mark Davidson	1, 4
Husqvarna	Husqvarna FE 450	(United Kingdom) Max Hunt	(United Kingdom) Max Hunt	2
Husqvarna	Husqvarna FE 450	(Czech Republic) Gabriela Novotna	(Czech Republic) Gabriela Novotna	2
Husqvarna	Husqvarna FE 450	(Mongolia) Bat-Undral Byambasuren	(Mongolia) Bat-Undral Byambasuren	2
Husqvarna	Husqvarna Factory Rally Replica	(Italy) Solarys Racing	(Italy) Maurizio Gerini	4
Husqvarna	Husqvarna Factory Rally Replica	(Italy) Solarys Racing	(Italy) Jacopo Cerutti	4
KTM	KTM 450 Rally Factory	(Austria) Red Bull KTM Factory Racing	(United Kingdom) Sam Sunderland	All
KTM	KTM 450 Rally Factory	(Austria) Red Bull KTM Factory Racing	(Argentina) Luciano Benavides	All
KTM	KTM 450 Rally Factory	(Austria) Red Bull KTM Factory Racing	(Spain) Laia Sanz	2, 4
KTM	KTM 450 Rally Factory	(Austria) Red Bull KTM Factory Racing	(Australia) Toby Price	3–4
KTM	KTM 450 Rally Factory	(Austria) Red Bull KTM Factory Racing	(Austria) Matthias Walkner	3–4
KTM	KTM 450 Rally Factory	(Austria) Red Bull KTM Factory Racing	(Portugal) Mario Patrao	4
KTM	KTM 450 Rally Replica	(United Arab Emirates) Mohammed Al Balooshi	(United Arab Emirates) Mohammed Al Balooshi	1
KTM	KTM 450 Rally Replica	(Kuwait) Mohammed Meshari Jaffar	(Kuwait) Mohammed Meshari Jaffar	1
KTM	KTM 450 Rally Replica	(Australia) Ben Young	(Australia) Ben Young	1, 4
KTM	KTM 450 Rally Replica	(United Arab Emirates) Vendetta Racing	(South Africa) Aaron Mare	1
KTM	KTM 450 Rally Replica	(United Arab Emirates) Vendetta Racing	(United Arab Emirates) David McBride	1
KTM	KTM 450 Rally Replica	(United Arab Emirates) Vendetta Racing	(United Kingdom) David Mabbs	1
KTM	KTM 450 Rally Replica	(United Arab Emirates) Vendetta Racing	(United Kingdom) David McBride	1
KTM	KTM 450 Rally Replica	(United Arab Emirates) Vendetta Racing	(United Kingdom) Kurt Burroughs	1
KTM	KTM 450 Rally Replica	(United Arab Emirates) Khalid Al Falasi	(United Arab Emirates) Khalid Al Falasi	1
KTM	KTM 450 Rally Replica	(United Arab Emirates) SRG - Motorsports	(South Africa) Alan Wilkinson	1
KTM	KTM 450 Rally Replica	(Mongolia) Unurbayar Batsaikhan	(Mongolia) Unurbayar Batsaikhan	2
KTM	KTM 450 Rally Replica	(Mongolia) Battur Baatar	(Mongolia) Battur Baatar	2
KTM	KTM 450 Rally Replica	(Netherlands) Guillaume Martens	(Netherlands) Guillaume Martens	2
KTM	KTM 450 Rally Replica	(Mongolia) Amgalan Enkhtuvshin	(Mongolia) Amgalan Enkhtuvshin	2
KTM	KTM 450 Rally Replica	(Mongolia) Enkhsaruul Davaa	(Mongolia) Enkhsaruul Davaa	2
KTM	KTM 450 Rally Replica	(Bolivia) Team Nosiglia	(Bolivia) Daniel Nosiglia	3
KTM	KTM 450 Rally Replica	(South Africa) Ross Branch	(South Africa) Ross Branch	4
KTM	KTM 450 Rally Replica	(Czech Republic) Martin Michek	(Czech Republic) Martin Michek	4
KTM	KTM 450 Rally Replica	(Czech Republic) Moto Racing Group	(Czech Republic) Milan Engel	4
KTM	KTM 450 Rally Replica	(Poland) Duust Rally Team	(Poland) Pawel Stasiaczek	4
KTM	KTM 450 Rally Replica	(Poland) Duust Rally Team	(Poland) Krzysztof Jarmuz	4
KTM	KTM 450 Rally Replica	(Poland) Duust Rally Team	(Poland) Konrad Dabrowski	4
KTM	KTM 450 Rally Replica	(Poland) Duust Rally Team	(Poland) Jacek Czachor	4
KTM	KTM 450 Rally Replica	(Poland) Duust Rally Team	(Poland) Artur Stasiaczek	4
KTM	KTM 450 Rally Replica	(Poland) Duust Rally Team	(Italy) Fabrizio Bosetti	4
KTM	KTM 450 Rally Replica	(Poland) Duust Rally Team	(Australia) Troy O'Connor	4
KTM	KTM 450 Rally Replica	(France) Philippe Cavelius	(France) Philippe Cavelius	4
KTM	KTM 450 Rally Replica	(South Africa) Taye Perry	(South Africa) Taye Perry	4
KTM	KTM 450 Rally Replica	(Netherlands) Team Bas Dakar	(Netherlands) Rob van Vegchel	4
KTM	KTM 450 Rally Replica	(Netherlands) Team Bas Dakar	(South Africa) Alex Ruprecht-Gersteroph	4
KTM	KTM 450 Rally Replica	(Netherlands) Team Bas Dakar	(New Zealand) Phillip Wilson	4
KTM	KTM 450 Rally Replica	(Netherlands) Team Bas Dakar	(Netherlands) Werner Kennedy	4
KTM	KTM 450 Rally Replica	(Netherlands) Team Bas Dakar	(Zimbabwe) Graeme Sharp	4
KTM	KTM 450 Rally Replica	(Netherlands) Team Bas Dakar	(Netherlands) Olaf Harmsen	4
KTM	KTM 450 Rally Replica	(United Kingdom) David Westwood	(United Kingdom) David Westwood	4
KTM	KTM 450 Rally Replica	(Belgium) Gilles Vanderweyen	(Belgium) Gilles Vanderweyen	4
KTM	KTM 450 Rally Replica	(Mexico) Juan Pablo Guillen	(Mexico) Juan Pablo Guillen	4
KTM	KTM 525 XC	(United Arab Emirates) Mohammed Al Shamsi	(United Arab Emirates) Mohammed Al Shamsi	1
KTM	KTM 500 EXC	(Saudi Arabia) Mishal Alghuneim	(Saudi Arabia) Mishal Alghuneim	1
KTM	KTM 500 EXC	(Sweden) Tomas Kristofferson	(Sweden) Tomas Kristofferson	1
KTM	KTM 500 EXC	(Slovakia) Jan Zatko	(Slovakia) Jan Zatko	1
KTM	KTM 500 EXC	(United Kingdom) John Richards	(United Kingdom) John Richards	1
KTM	KTM 500 EXC	(United Kingdom) Georg Telling	(United Kingdom) Georg Telling	1
Sherco	Sherco TVS Rally	(France) Sherco TVS Rally Factory	(Spain) Lorenzo Santolino	4
Sherco	Sherco TVS Rally	(France) Sherco TVS Rally Factory	(France) Johnny Aubert	4
Sherco	Sherco TVS Rally	(France) Sherco TVS Rally Factory	(France) Mickaël Metge	4
Yamaha	Yamaha WR450F	(Japan) Yamaha Rally Team	(France) Xavier De Soultrait	2, 4
Yamaha	Yamaha WR450F	(Japan) Yamaha Rally Team	(France) Adrien Van Beveren	2, 4
Yamaha	Yamaha WR450F	(Japan) Yamaha Rally Team	(Argentina) Franco Caimi	2, 4
Yamaha	Yamaha WR450F	(Netherlands) Kees Koolen	(Netherlands) Kees Koolen	1
Yamaha	Yamaha WR450F	(Italy) Carlo Seminara	(Italy) Carlo Seminara	1, 4
Yamaha	Yamaha WR450F	(Netherlands) Erik Bergens	(Netherlands) Erik Bergens	1
Yamaha	Yamaha YZ450F	(United Arab Emirates) Abdulla bin Dakhan	(United Arab Emirates) Abdulla bin Dakhan	1
Yamaha	Yamaha YZ450FX	(United Arab Emirates) Ahmed Al Qasemi	(United Arab Emirates) Ahmed Al Qasemi	1
Yamaha	Yamaha 450 WRF	(United Arab Emirates) Marcel Chomic	(United Arab Emirates) Marcel Chomic	1
Yamaha	Yamaha Raptor 700	(Poland) Sonik Team	(Poland) Rafal Sonik	All
Yamaha	Yamaha Raptor 700	(Kuwait) Fahad Al Musallam	(Kuwait) Fahad Al Musallam	1
Yamaha	Yamaha Raptor 700	(Chile) Luis Barahona	(Chile) Luis Barahona	3
Yamaha	Yamaha Raptor 700	(Chile) Ignacio Casale	(Chile) Ignacio Casale	4
Yamaha	Yamaha Raptor 700	(France) Team Giroud	(France) Alexandre Giroud	4
Yamaha	Yamaha Raptor 700	(France) Romain Dutu	(France) Romain Dutu	4
Yamaha	Yamaha Raptor 700	(Poland) Wisniewski Team	(Poland) Kamil Wisniewski	4
Yamaha	Yamaha Raptor 700	(France) Drag On ATV	(France) Axel Dutrie	4
Yamaha	Yamaha YFM 700R	(Russia) Aleksandr Maksimov	(Russia) Aleksandr Maksimov	1–2
Yamaha	Yamaha YFM 700R	(Argentina) Manuel Andujar	(Argentina) Manuel Andujar	1
Yamaha	Yamaha 490 WRF	(United Kingdom) James West	(United Kingdom) James West	1

== Results ==
=== Motorbikes ===
Round	Rally name	Podium finishers			
Round	Rally name	Rank	Rider	Bike	Time
1	(United Arab Emirates) Abu Dhabi Desert Challenge	1	(United Kingdom) Sam Sunderland	KTM 450 Rally Factory	17:46:42
1	(United Arab Emirates) Abu Dhabi Desert Challenge	2	(Argentina) Luciano Benavides	KTM 450 Rally Factory	17:55:02
1	(United Arab Emirates) Abu Dhabi Desert Challenge	3	(Chile) Jose Cornejo	Honda CRF 450 Rally	17:56:41
2	(Russia) (Mongolia) (China) Silk Way Rally	1	(United Kingdom) Sam Sunderland	KTM 450 Rally Factory	26:12:47
2	(Russia) (Mongolia) (China) Silk Way Rally	2	(United States) Andrew Short	Husqvarna FR450	26:33:09
2	(Russia) (Mongolia) (China) Silk Way Rally	3	(France) Adrien Van Beveren	Yamaha WR450F	26:33:48
3	(Chile) Atacama Rally	1	(Chile) Pablo Quintanilla	Husqvarna FR450	15:15:59
3	(Chile) Atacama Rally	2	(United Kingdom) Sam Sunderland	KTM 450 Rally Factory	15:19:55
3	(Chile) Atacama Rally	3	(Spain) Joan Barreda	Honda CRF 450 Rally	15:24:20
4	(Morocco) Rallye du Maroc	1	(United States) Andrew Short	Husqvarna FR450	18:03:54
4	(Morocco) Rallye du Maroc	2	(Chile) Pablo Quintanilla	Husqvarna FR450	18:05:15
4	(Morocco) Rallye du Maroc	3	(Spain) Joan Barreda	Honda CRF 450 Rally	18:06:38

=== Quads ===
Round	Rally name	Podium finishers			
Round	Rally name	Rank	Rider	Quad	Time
1	(United Arab Emirates) Abu Dhabi Desert Challenge	1	(United Arab Emirates) Fahad Al Musallam	Yamaha Raptor 700	21:51:28
1	(United Arab Emirates) Abu Dhabi Desert Challenge	2	(Poland) Rafal Sonik	Yamaha Raptor 700	21:52:41
1	(United Arab Emirates) Abu Dhabi Desert Challenge	3	(Russia) Aleksandr Maksimov	Yamaha YFM 700R	21:57:20
2	(Russia) (Mongolia) (China) Silk Way Rally	1	(Poland) Rafal Sonik	Yamaha Raptor 700	34:18:54
2	(Russia) (Mongolia) (China) Silk Way Rally	2	(Russia) Aleksandr Maksimov	Yamaha YFM 700R	35:51:07
2	(Russia) (Mongolia) (China) Silk Way Rally	3			
3	(Chile) Atacama Rally	1	(Poland) Rafal Sonik	Yamaha Raptor 700	21:42:07
3	(Chile) Atacama Rally	2	(Chile) Luis Barahona	Yamaha Raptor 700	23:26:23
3	(Chile) Atacama Rally	3			
4	(Morocco) Rallye du Maroc	1	(Chile) Ignacio Casale	Yamaha Raptor 700	23:00:29
4	(Morocco) Rallye du Maroc	2	(Poland) Rafal Sonik	Yamaha Raptor 700	23:30:17
4	(Morocco) Rallye du Maroc	3	(Poland) Kamil Wisniewski	Yamaha Raptor 700	24:08:44

== Championship standings ==
=== Riders' championship ===
- Points for final positions were awarded as follows:

Position	1st	2nd	3rd	4th	5th	6th	7th	8th	9th	10th	11th	12th	13th	14th	15th+
Points	25	20	16	13	11	10	9	8	7	6	5	4	3	2	1

In Marathon Rallies (i.e. rallies with between eight and fifteen timed stages, including a rest day), the score was multiplied by 1.5 and rounded up.

Furthermore, all riders were awarded 3 bonus points for taking part in the first stage of an event; 1 bonus point for all riders taking the start of a stage (other than the first one) of a Marathon Rally; as well as 1 bonus point for each stage win. No rider was required to be classified in order to score these bonus points.

Points for manufacturers were awarded by added the top two finishers of the respective manufacturer together from each event.

==== Motorbikes World Championship: Riders and Manufacturers ====
Pos	Rider	ABU (United Arab Emirates)	RUS (Russia)	CHI (Chile)	MAR (Morocco)	Points
1	(United Kingdom) Sam Sunderland	1^{31}	1^{52}	2^{23}	Ret^{4}	110
2	(United States) Andrew Short	5^{14}	2^{42}	8^{11}	1^{28}	95
3	(Argentina) Kevin Benavides	4^{16}	4^{35}	5^{15}	10^{9}	75
4	(Argentina) Luciano Benavides	2^{23}	5^{28}	10^{9}	6^{13}	73
5	(Spain) Joan Barreda	20^{4}	9^{22}	3^{19}	3^{20}	65
6	(Chile) José Ignacio Cornejo	3^{21}	11^{19}	9^{10}	11^{8}	58
7	(Chile) Pablo Quintanilla			1^{31}	2^{23}	54
8	(France) Adrien Van Beveren		3^{35}		47^{4}	39
9	(Australia) Toby Price			4^{17}	4^{18}	35
10	(Spain) Laia Sanz		7^{25}		18^{4}	29
11	(United States) Ricky Brabec			6^{13}	5^{14}	27
12	(Spain) Oriol Mena		6^{27}			27
13	(Poland) Adam Tomiczek		8^{23}		17^{4}	27
14	(Austria) Matthias Walkner			7^{12}	7^{12}	24
15	(Argentina) Franco Caimi		14^{14}		9^{10}	24
16	(Poland) Maciej Giemza		10^{20}		20^{4}	24
17	(Portugal) Paulo Gonçalves		15^{13}		13^{7}	20
18	(Netherlands) Guillaume Martens		12^{17}			17
19	(South Africa) Aaron Mare	16^{4}		11^{8}	19^{4}	16
20	(Mongolia) Boldbaatar Damdinkhorloo		13^{16}			16
21	(France) Xavier De Soultrait		20^{12}		43^{4}	16
22	(United Kingdom) Ryan Blair	6^{13}				13
23	(Mongolia) Unurbayar Batsaikhan		16^{13}			13
24	(Mongolia) Amgalan Enkhtuvshin		17^{13}			13
25	(Mongolia) Enkhsaruul Davaa		18^{13}			13
26	(Mongolia) Bat-Undral Byambasuren		19^{13}			13
27	(United Arab Emirates) Mohammad Jaafar Meshari	7^{12}				12
28	(South Africa) Ross Branch				8^{11}	11
29	(South Africa) Mark Ackermann	8^{11}				11
30	(Russia) Anastasiya Nifontiva	14^{5}	Ret^{6}			11
31	(Kuwait) Mohammed Al Balooshi	9^{10}				10
32	(Bolivia) Daniel Nosiglia			Ret^{3}	12^{7}	10
33	(Australia) Benjamin Young	13^{6}			27^{4}	10
34	(United Kingdom) David McBride	10^{9}				9
35	(United Kingdom) David Mabbs	11^{8}				8
36	(Peru) Gianna Velarde			12^{7}		7
37	(United Kingdom) William McBride	12^{7}				7
38	(Australia) Mark Davidson	15^{4}			Ret^{3}	7
39	(Italy) Carlo Seminara	22^{4}			Ret^{3}	7
40	(United Kingdom) Max Hunt		Ret^{6}			6
41	(Czech Republic) Gabriela Novotna		Ret^{6}			6
42	(France) Johnny Aubert				14^{5}	5
43	(Portugal) Joaquim Rodrigues				15^{4}	4
44	(Italy) Jacopo Cerutti				16^{4}	4
45	(Netherlands) Kees Koolen	17^{4}				4
46	(Slovakia) Marcel Chomic	18^{4}				4
47	(United Arab Emirates) Khalid Al Falasi	19^{4}				4
48	(France) Mickaël Metge				21^{4}	4
49	(United Kingdom) Kurt Burroughs	21^{4}				4
50	(Portugal) Mario Patrão				22^{4}	4
51	(Czech Republic) Milan Engel				23^{4}	4
52	(India) CS Santosh				24^{4}	4
53	(Mongolia) Battur Baatar		Ret^{4}			4
54	(Poland) Krzysztof Jarmuz				25^{4}	4
55	(Poland) Pawel Stasiaczek				26^{4}	4
56	(France) Philippe Cavelius				28^{4}	4
57	(Czech Republic) Martin Michek				29^{4}	4
58	(Poland) Konrad Dabrowski				30^{4}	4
59	(Poland) Jacek Czachor				31^{4}	4
60	(Belgium) Gilles Vanderweyen				32^{4}	4
61	(Zimbabwe) Graeme Sharpe				33^{4}	4
62	(South Africa) Taye Perry				34^{4}	4
63	(Mexico) Juan Pablo Guillen				35^{4}	4
64	(Netherlands) Rob van Vegchel				36^{4}	4
65	(New Zealand) Phillip Wilson				37^{4}	4
66	(Netherlands) Floor Maten				38^{4}	4
67	(South Africa) Werner Kennedy				39^{4}	4
68	(Australia) Troy O'Connor				40^{4}	4
69	(Netherlands) Olaf Harmsen				41^{4}	4
70	(Italy) Fabrizio Bosetti				42^{4}	4
71	(Poland) Artur Stasiaczek				44^{4}	4
72	(South Africa) Alex Ruprecht-Gersteroph				45^{4}	4
73	(Bahrain) Salman Mohamed				46^{4}	4
74	(Bahrain) Abdulaziz Al Khalifa				48^{4}	4
75	(Kuwait) Abdullah T. Alshatti	Ret^{3}				3
76	(South Africa) Alan Wilkinson	Ret^{3}				3
77	(United Kingdom) Andrew Haddon	Ret^{3}				3
78	(Spain) Lorenzo Santolino				Ret^{3}	3
79	(Italy) Maurizio Gerini				Ret^{3}	3
80	(United Kingdom) David Westwood				Ret^{3}	3
Pos	Rider	ABU (United Arab Emirates)	RUS (Russia)	CHI (Chile)	MAR (Morocco)	Points

Pos	Manufacturer	ABU (United Arab Emirates)	RUS (Russia)	CHI (Chile)	MAR (Morocco)	Points
1	(Austria) KTM	54	80	40	31	205
2	(Austria) Husqvarna	27	65	42	51	185
3	(Japan) Honda	37	57	34	34	162
4	(Japan) Yamaha	8	49		14	71
5	(India) Hero		40		11	51
6	(France) Sherco				9	9
Pos	Manufacturer	ABU (United Arab Emirates)	RUS (Russia)	CHI (Chile)	MAR (Morocco)	Points

==== Quads World Cup: Riders ====
Pos	Rider	ABU (United Arab Emirates)	RUS (Russia)	CHI (Chile)	MAR (Morocco)	Points
1	(Poland) Rafał Sonik	2^{23}	1^{49}	1^{28}	2^{23}	123
2	(Russia) Aleksandr Maksimov	3^{19}	2^{41}			60
3	(Chile) Ignacio Casale				1^{28}	28
4	(Kuwait) Fahad N. AlMusallam	1^{28}				28
5	(Poland) Arkadiusz Lindner	4^{16}	Ret^{9}			25
6	(Chile) Luis Barahona			2^{23}		23
7	(Poland) Kamil Wisniewski				3^{19}	19
8	(France) Romain Dutu				4^{16}	16
9	(France) Alexandre Giroud				5^{14}	14
10	(France) Axel Dutrie				6^{13}	13
Pos	Rider	ABU (United Arab Emirates)	RUS (Russia)	CHI (Chile)	MAR (Morocco)	Points
