= 2020 FIM Cross-Country Rallies World Championship =

2020 FIM Cross-Country Rallies World Championship
Previous:	2019	Next:	2021

The 2020 FIM Cross-Country Rallies World Championship was set to be the 18th season of the FIM Cross-Country Rallies World Championship, an international rally raid competition for motorbikes and quads. Due to COVID-19 pandemic all events and thus the season, were canceled.

== Calendar ==
The calendar for the 2020 season originally featured five long-distance rally raid events; including one marathon event in the Silk Way Rally. Four of the events were also part of 2020 FIA World Cup for Cross-Country Rallies; with the Rally dos Sertões remaining solely under the auspices of the FIM. Due to COVID-19 pandemic all events were canceled.

Original Date	Rally name
20-26 March	(United Arab Emirates) Abu Dhabi Desert Challenge
24–29 May	Rally Kazakhstan
3–16 July	(Russia) (Kazakhstan) (China) Silk Way Rally
14–23 August	(Brazil) Rally dos Sertões
8–13 October	(Morocco) Rallye du Maroc

== Regulation changes ==
Starting with the 2020 season new categories have been introduced with the RallyGP category being for professionals and experienced riders, Rally2 for newcomers, and the Rally Adventure trophy for riders without assistance. SSVs would be introduced as their own category for all events.

The end of season there would be awards as follows:

- World Championship for RallyGP riders and manufacturers in the bike class
- World Cups for Rally2 riders in the Moto-Rally, Moto-Enduro, and Quad groups.
- World Cups for women and juniors in the RallyGP category
- World Cups for SSVs
