= Joan Barreda =

Spanish motorcycle racer

Joan Barreda Bort
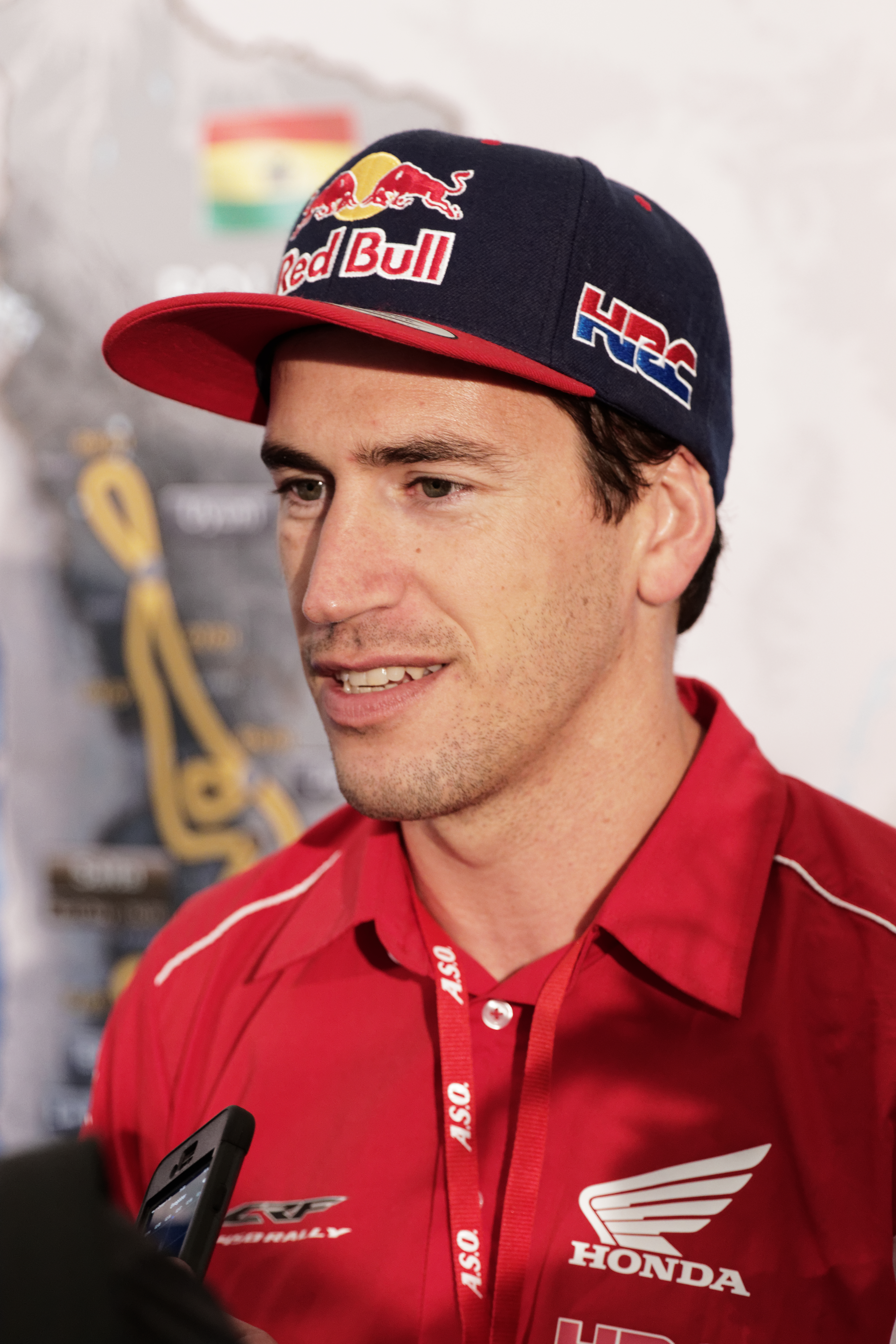
- Barreda before 2016 Dakar Rally
- Born: 11 August 1983 (age 43); Torreblanca, Castellón, Spain

Dakar Rally career
- Debut season: 2011
- Current team: Honda
- Former teams: Aprilia, Husqvarna
- Starts: 11
- Wins: 0 (29 stage wins)
- Best finish: 5th in 2017, 2022

FIM Cross-Country Rallies World Championship career
- Debut season: 2012
- Current team: Honda
- Former teams: Husqvarna
- Wins: 2
- Best finish: 3rd in 2014

Joan Barreda Bort (born 11 August 1983 in Castellón de la Plana) is a Spanish rally raid motorcycle rider, best known for his participation in the Dakar Rally.

== Career ==
Barreda Bort made his Dakar debut in 2011, riding an Aprilia, but was forced to retire during the second stage of the event due to a fall. Switching to Husqvarna machinery for 2012, Barreda Bort had a promising start - finishing third during the second stage of the rally - before losing significant time to mechanical problems. Nonetheless, he continued to show strong pace for the remainder of the rally, winning the tenth stage, and ultimately finished in 11th overall, three hours and 37 minutes down on the winning time of Cyril Despres. Later that year, Barreda Bort won the motorcycle category of the Egyptian-based Pharaons Rally for Husqvarna, winning the first, third and fourth stages. In addition, Barreda Bort won the Spanish Baja, once again aboard a Husqvarna.

Continuing with Husqvarna for 2013, Barreda Bort took the lead of the overall classification with victory in the second stage. However, navigation problems in the third stage and fuel pump problems in the fifth stage restricted him to 17th place overall, in spite of three additional victories in the fourth, eighth and tenth stages of the rally. His time was just over three hours shy of that of the winner, Despres.

In 2014, Barreda Bort led early on after winning two of the first three stages, only to drop back behind Marc Coma after navigation problems on stages four and five. He was on course to finish a comfortable second to Coma before suffering electrical failure on the penultimate stage, relegating him to seventh place at the finish despite taking the most stage wins of anybody (five). The same year, Barreda Bort contested four rounds of the FIM Cross-Country Rallies championship, winning the Qatar-based Sealine Rally en route to finishing third in that year's standings.

In the following years, Barreda Bort became one of the favourites to win the Dakar Rally in bikes, specially after the retirement of Marc Coma and Cyril Despres from such category. After touching the podium on several occasions, Barreda Bort arrived to the 2017 Dakar Rally with high hopes after a good year of preparation. When he was leading the category by more than 12 minutes after the first three stages, Barreda Bort was penalized with one hour for refueling in an illegal zone. Barreda finished in fifth place and 43 minutes behind the winner.

Barreda Bort finished seventh overall in 2020 Dakar Rally.

In 2021 Dakar Rally, Barreda equaled Jordi Arcarons as the third rider with the most stages won in the bike category, with a total of 27.

Barreda Bort finished the 2022 Dakar Rally in fifth place. After losing about 40 minutes in the first leg of the rally, he tried to close the gap for the following days. With a win in the second stage, and another one in the forth, Barreda Bort became as the third bike rider with most stages won. Despite falling in stage five and getting heavily injured, Barreda Bort was fighting for the final podium until the last days of the race, finally finishing in the top-five.

== Dakar Rally results ==
Year	Class	Vehicle	Position	Stages won
2011	Motorbike	(Italy) Aprilia	DNF	0
2012	Motorbike	(Sweden) Husqvarna	11th	1
2013	Motorbike	(Sweden) Husqvarna	17th	4
2014	Motorbike	(Japan) Honda	7th	5
2015	Motorbike	(Japan) Honda	17th	3
2016	Motorbike	(Japan) Honda	DNF	1^{P}
2017	Motorbike	(Japan) Honda	5th	4
2018	Motorbike	(Japan) Honda	DNF	3
2019	Motorbike	(Japan) Honda	DNF	1
2020	Motorbike	(Japan) Honda	7th	1
2021	Motorbike	(Japan) Honda	DNF	3
2022	Motorbike	(Japan) Honda	5th	2
2023	Motorbike	(Japan) Honda	DNF	1
2024	Motorbike	(India) Hero	DNF	0

- P denotes Prologue

== Other results ==
=== FIM Cross-Country Rallies World Championship results ===
Year	Bike	Races	Wins	Podiums	Points	Position
2012	(Sweden) Husqvarna	4	1	2	40	5th
2013	(Japan) Honda	1	0	1	15	13th
2014	(Japan) Honda	4	1	2	68	3rd
2015	(Japan) Honda	3	0	1	33	12th
2018	(Japan) Honda	1	0	0	3	50th
2019	(Japan) Honda	4	0	2	65	5th

=== FIM World Rally-Raid Championship results ===
(key)

Year	Team	Bike	Class	1	2	3	4	Pos.	Points
2022	Monster Energy Honda Team	Honda 450 CRF Rally	RallyGP	DAK; 5	ABU	MOR	AND	15th	17

=== FIM Bajas World Cup results ===
Year	Bike	Races	Wins	Podiums	Points	Position
2012	(Sweden) Husqvarna	1	1	1	20	7th
2013	(Japan) Honda	1	1	1	20	7th
2016	(Japan) Honda	1	1	1	20	7th
2017	(Japan) Honda	1	1	1	20	5th
2021	(Japan) Honda	1	1	1	25	11th

=== Rally raid best results (Motorbikes) ===
Event	Wins	Podiums
(Spain) Spanish Baja	5	(gold) x5 (2012, 2013, 2016, 2017, 2021)
(United States) Vegas to Reno	2	(gold) x2 (2016, 2017)
Qatar Cross-Country Rally	1	(gold) x1 (2014), (silver) x1 (2015)
(Egypt) Rallye des Pharaons	1	(gold) x1 (2012)
China Grand Rally	1	(gold) x1 (2016)
(Morocco) Merzouga Rally	1	(gold) x1 (2018)
(Spain) Andalucía Rally	1	(gold) x1 (2021)
(Morocco) Rallye du Maroc	0	(silver) x1 (2012), (bronze) x2 (2013, 2019)
(United Arab Emirates) Abu Dhabi Desert Challenge	0	(silver) x1 (2012), (bronze) x1 (2014)
(Argentina) Desafio Ruta 40	0	(silver) x1 (2012)
(Chile) Atacama Rally	0	(silver) x1 (2019)
