= China Grand Rally =

Former rally-raid event

- Category: Rally raid
- Region: China
- Inaugural season: 2013
- Folded: 2016

The China Grand Rally (also known as China Silk Road Rally) was a rally raid held in China from 2013 to 2016. It was promoted by the former Dakar Rally winner Hubert Auriol.

With about 6.000 km of distance and 12 timed stages crossing the regions of Shaanxi, Ningxia, Inner Mongolia, Gansu, and Xinjiang, it was the second largest marathon rally held in 2013.

== Winners ==
Year	Cars		Bikes	
Year	Driver Co-driver	Car	Rider	Bike
2013	(China) Zhou Yong (N/A) ??	Haval	(Argentina) Pablo Oscar Pascual	Jincheng
2014	(France) Christian Lavieille (France) Jean-Pierre Garcin	Haval	(China) Wen Min Su	Jincheng
2015	(France) Stéphane Peterhansel (France) Jean-Paul Cottret	Peugeot 3008 DKR	(Spain) Armand Monleón	KTM 450 Rally
2016	(N/A) ?? (N/A) ??	??	(Spain) Joan Barreda	Honda CRF450 Rally
