= Sardegna Rally Race =

- Race logo
- Category: Rally raid
- Inaugural event: 1984
- Folded: 2017
- Official Website: www.bikevillage.it

The Sardegna Rally Race (formerly known as Rally di Sardegna), is a motorcycle rally-raid that was held in Sardinia, Italy from 1984 to 2017. It was renamed in 2008, so as not to be confused with the Rally di Sardegna car race. It was a round of the FIM Cross-Country Rallies World Championship from 2009 until 2016.

== Editions ==
Rally di Sardegna
Year	Biker	Bike
1984	(Italy) Andrea Balestrieri	Aprilia
1985	(Italy) Ivan Alborghetti	Gilera
1986	(France) Gilles Lalay	Honda
1987	(Italy) Ivan Alborghetti	KTM
1988	(Italy) Fabio Fasola	KTM
1989	(Italy) Massimo Chiesa	Yamaha
1990	(Italy) Angelo Cavandoli	Yamaha
1991	(France) Gilles Lalay	Yamaha
1992	not held	
1993	(Italy) Emanuele Cristanelli	Honda
1994	(Italy) Gianluca Tassi	Yamaha
1995	not held	
1996	(Italy) Massimo Chiesa	KTM
1997	(Italy) Matteo Graziani	Yamaha
1998	(Italy) Matteo Graziani	KTM
1999	(Italy) Antonio Colombo	Yamaha
2000	not held	
2001	(Italy) Matteo Graziani	KTM
2002	(Italy) Matteo Graziani	KTM
2003	(Spain) Nani Roma	KTM
2004	(Italy) Federico Mancinelli	KTM
2005	(Spain) Marc Coma	KTM
2006	(Spain) Marc Coma	KTM
2007	(Spain) Marc Coma	KTM
Sardegna Rally Race
Year	Biker	Bike
2008	(France) Cyril Despres	KTM
2009	(France) Cyril Despres	KTM
2010	(Spain) Marc Coma	KTM
2011	(Spain) Marc Coma	KTM
2012	(Spain) Jordi Viladoms	KTM
2013	(Spain) Marc Coma	KTM
2014	(Italy) Alessandro Botturi	Husqvarna
2015	(Austria) Matthias Walkner	KTM
2016	(Spain) Joan Pedrero	Sherco
2017	(Italy) Alessandro Botturi	Yamaha
