= Gemeses =

- Civil parish
- Location in Portugal
- Coordinates: 41°31′21″N 8°43′51″W
- Country: Portugal
- Region: Norte
- Intermunic. comm.: Cávado
- District: Braga
- Municipality: Esposende

Area
  - Total: 5.57 km^{2} (2.15 sq mi)

Population (2011)
  - Total: 1,078
  - Density: 190/km^{2} (500/sq mi)
- Time zone: UTC+00:00 (WET)
  - Summer (DST): UTC+01:00 (WEST)

Gemeses is a civil parish in the municipality of Esposende, Portugal. The population in 2011 was 1,078, in an area of 5.57 km^{2} (2.15 sq mi).

== Notable people ==
- Paulo Gonçalves (1979–2020), motorcyclist
