= Kevin Benavides =

Argentine motorcycle racer

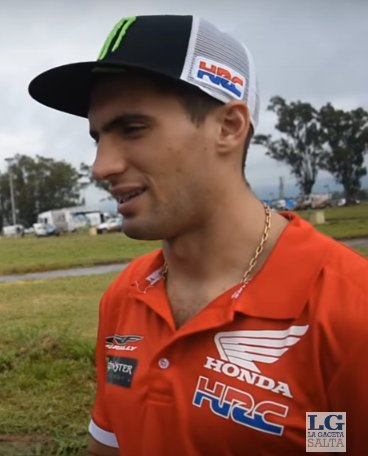
- Kevin Benavides in 2017
- Born: January 9, 1989 (age 37); Salta, Argentina
- Height: 172 cm (5 ft 8 in)

Dakar Rally career
- Debut season: 2016
- Current team: KTM
- Starts: 5
- Wins: 2 (8 stage wins)
- Best finish: 1st in 2021, 2023

FIM Cross-Country Rallies World Championship career
- Debut season: 2015
- Current team: Honda
- Wins: 2
- Best finish: 2nd in 2017

Kevin Max Benavides (born 9 January 1989) is an Argentine rally raid motorcyclist who is best known for winning the Dakar Rally twice, in 2021 and 2023, as well as coming second place in 2018. He is a former driver of the Monster Energy Honda Racing. In April 2021, he signed to race for Red Bull KTM Factory Racing in both the FIM Cross-Country Rallies World Championship and the Dakar Rally onboard the KTM 450 RALLY.

== Biography ==
He is the brother of Luciano, a rally raid biker too.

Benavides won the 2021 Dakar Rally in the bike category.

Benavides recently signed with the KTM Factory Red Bull team, starting on 7 April 2021.

== Dakar Rally results ==
Year	Class	Vehicle	Position	Stages won
2016	Motorbike	(Japan) Honda	4th	1
2017	Did not enter			
2018	Motorbike	(Japan) Honda	2nd	1
2019	Motorbike	(Japan) Honda	5th	0
2020	Motorbike	(Japan) Honda	19th	1
2021	Motorbike	(Japan) Honda	1st	2
2022	Motorbike	(Austria) KTM	100th	1
2023	Motorbike	(Austria) KTM	1st	2
2024	Motorbike	(Austria) KTM	4th	3
2025	Motorbike	(Austria) KTM	DNF	0

== Other results ==
=== FIM Cross-Country Rallies World Championship results ===
Year	Bike	Races	Wins	Podiums	Points	Position
2015	(Japan) Honda	1	0	0	16	18th
2016	(Japan) Honda	3	0	1	36	9th
2017	(Japan) Honda	5	1	3	97	2nd
2018	(Japan) Honda	4	1	2	56	6th
2019	(Japan) Honda	4	0	0	75	3rd

=== Rally raid best results (Motorbikes) ===
Event	Wins	Podiums
(Argentina) Desafio Ruta 40	2	(gold) x2 (2016, 2017)
(Chile) Atacama Rally	1	(gold) x1 (2018); (silver) x1 (2017); (bronze) x1 (2016)
(Paraguay) Desafio Guarani	1	(gold) x1 (2015)
(Spain) Andalucia Rally	1	(gold) x1 (2020); (silver) x1 (2022)
(Morocco) Rallye du Maroc	0	(silver) x1 (2017)
(United Arab Emirates) Abu Dhabi Desert Challenge	0	(bronze) x1 (2018)
