= Cyril Despres =

French motorcycle racer

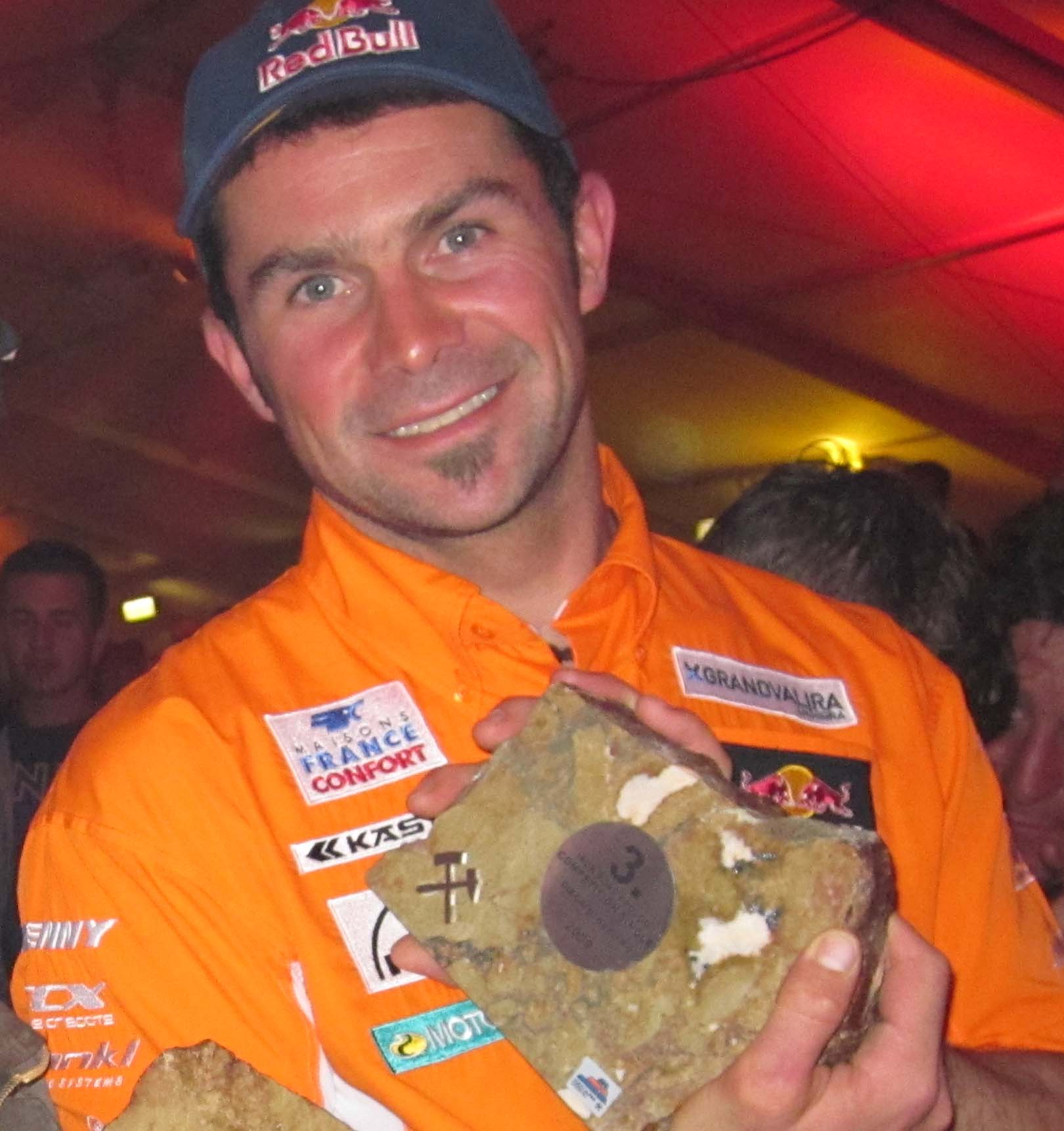
- Cyril Despres in 2009

Personal information
- Born: January 24, 1974 (age 52) Nemours, France
- Height: 1.80 m (5 ft 11 in)
- Weight: 82 kg (181 lb)

Sport
- Country: France
- Sport: Motorsport (cars, bikes)
- Event: Rally raid

Achievements and titles
- World finals: 2 World Championship (2003, 2009)
Medal record
Rally raid (bikes)
Event	1st	2nd	3rd
Dakar Rally	5	4	1
Rally of Tunisia	3	1	1
Rallye du Maroc	4	1	2
Abu Dhabi Desert Challenge	5	-	-
Rallye dos Sertões	2	3	0
Sardegna Rally Race	2	-	-
Total	21	9	4
Rally raid (cars)
Event	1st	2nd	3rd
Dakar Rally	0	0	1
Silk Way Rally	2	-	-
Total	2	0	1

Cyril Despres (born 24 January 1974) is a French rally racer and resident of Andorra. He won the Dakar Rally five times, in 2005, 2007, 2010, 2012 and 2013, riding a KTM motorcycle. He also won the Red Bull Romaniacs, an enduro event, three times, in 2004, 2005 and 2007, and the Erzberg Rodeo in 2002 and 2003. For the 2018 season, he was one of the official drivers of the Team Peugeot Total.

== Career ==
On 10 January 2012, at the 2012 Dakar Rally, Portuguese pilot Paulo Gonçalves pulled Despres out of the mud but Despres did not return the favour. Out of seven riders, all but the Spaniard Marc Coma got stuck; the organisers therefore changed the course. At the end of the stage, the time lost was credited to Despres. Goncalves received a penalty of six hours for receiving external help. Coma was not credited the time he lost by going around the mudhole.

After a closely fought battle with his KTM teammate, Spaniard Marc Coma for the victory, Despres got back into the lead on the penultimate stage (Stage 13) thanks to a mechanical failure on Coma's bike. Despres managed to maintain the lead until the end of the rally. Thus, Despres gained his fourth overall victory on the Dakar Rally, equaling former Honda and Cagiva rider, Italian Edi Orioli's performance.

A new chapter began in Despres' Dakar career in 2015 when he joined the Peugeot team as a driver alongside Carlos Sainz and Stéphane Peterhansel, who previously switched from the motorbike to car category with great success. His co-driver was Gilles Picard, and they finished 34th. In 2016, Despres came in seventh overall; his co-driver was David Castera.

In July 2016, Despres and Castera won the cars' category at the Silk Way Rally. Despres and his partner repeated their success in the next year.

== Dakar Rally results ==
Year	Class	Vehicle	Position	Stages won
2000	Motorbike	(Japan) Honda	16th	0
2001	Motorbike	(Germany) BMW	13th	1
2002	Motorbike	(Austria) KTM	DNF	0
2003	Motorbike	(Austria) KTM	2nd	3
2004	Motorbike	(Austria) KTM	3rd	4
2005	Motorbike	(Austria) KTM	1st	2
2006	Motorbike	(Austria) KTM	2nd	4
2007	Motorbike	(Austria) KTM	1st	2
2008	Event cancelled – replaced by Central Europe Rally			
2009	Motorbike	(Austria) KTM	2nd	4
2010	Motorbike	(Austria) KTM	1st	3
2011	Motorbike	(Austria) KTM	2nd	3
2012	Motorbike	(Austria) KTM	1st	3
2013	Motorbike	(Austria) KTM	1st	1
2014	Motorbike	(Japan) Yamaha	4th	3
2015	Cars	(France) Peugeot	34th	0
2016	Cars	(France) Peugeot	7th	0
2017	Cars	(France) Peugeot	3rd	1
2018	Cars	(France) Peugeot	31st	1
2019	Cars	(United Kingdom) Mini	5th	0
2020	SSV	(Belgium) OT3 buggy	DNF	0
2021	Cars	(France) Peugeot	10th	0

== Other results ==
Cars

- Silk Way Rally

(gold) 2016 (Peugeot 2008 DKR), 2017 (Peugeot 3008 DKR)

Bikes

- Tunisia Rally

(gold) (2004, 2005, 2009)
(silver) (2003)
(bronze) (2000)

- Orient Rally

(gold) (2005)

- Rallye du Maroc

(gold) (2000, 2003, 2010, 2012)

- Brazil Rally

(gold) (2006, 2011)
(silver) (2007, 2009, 2013)

- Rally dos Sertões

(gold) (2009)

Sporting positions
Preceded by Nani Roma	Dakar Rally; Motorcycle Winner; 2005	Succeeded by Marc Coma
Preceded by Marc Coma	Dakar Rally; Motorcycle Winner; 2007	Succeeded by Marc Coma
Preceded by Marc Coma	Dakar Rally; Motorcycle Winner; 2010	Succeeded by Marc Coma
Preceded by Marc Coma	Dakar Rally; Motorcycle Winner; 2012–2013	Succeeded by Marc Coma
