= Anastasiya Nifontova =

Russian rally raid motorcycle rider

Anastasiya Niftontova
- Nationality: Russian
- Born: 19 January 1979 (age 47) Washington, D.C., U.S.
- Championships: FIM Cross-Country Rallies World Championship (women)
- Wins: 2015, 2021

Anastasiya Nikolayevna Nifontova (Russian: Анастасия Николаевна Нифонтова; born 19 January 1979) is a Russian rally raid motorcycle rider.

Nifontova was born in Washington, D.C. to a family of Russian-Americans who emigrated more than 25 prior. At the time of her birth, Nifontova's father was an engineer contracted by the Soviet Union in the construction of the new Russian Embassy. Influenced by this experience, Nifontova's family applied to remigrate to the USSR and returned to the country in 1984. Nifontova has commented that she does not currently hold American citizenship.

Niftontova won the FIM Women's Cross-Country Rallies World Cup in 2015 and 2021. She was the first Russian woman to take part in the Dakar Rally in the motorcycle category, finishing second among female motorcycle racers in the 2017. She became the first woman to finish in this rally-raid in the Original by Motul category, in which the participants compete without technical support.

Nifontova has been married twice and has two children, Maria and Timofey.
