= Rally dos Sertões =

Rally dos Sertões is a rally raid competition held in Brazil since 1993. Its name refers to the sertão region of countryside Brazil.

== History ==
Its precursor was the "Rally São Francisco", organized in 1991 by the architect and racing enthusiast Chico Morais, inspired by the Paris-Dakar Rally. The then motorcycles-only competition started at Ribeirão Preto and finished at Maceió. The rally was first held with its current name in 1993, starting at Campos do Jordão and finishing at Natal; 34 competitors participated in the competition. The following year, 44 competitors took in. In 1995, the rally was open for automobiles and in 1996, for drivers outside Brazil. Besides bikes and cars, the rally has categories for trucks, quad bikes and UTVs. In 2005, the Rally joined the FIM Cross-Country Rallies World Championship calendar.

== Winners ==
Year	Motorcycles	Automobiles	Quad	Trucks	UTV
1993	(Brazil) Gilmar dos Anjos	-	-	-	-
1994	Joaquim G. Rodrigues Juca Bala	-	-	-	-
1995	(Brazil) Jean Azevedo	Wedigo Von Borries; Suen Von Borries	-	-	-
1996	Joaquim G. Rodrigues Juca Bala	Cacá Clauset; Norton Lopes	-	-	-
1997	Juliano Sacioto	Klever Kolberg; André Azevedo	-	-	-
1998	(Austria) H. Kinigadner	Klever Kolberg; André Azevedo	-	-	-
1999	(Brazil) José Hélio G. R. Fillo	Riamburgo Ximenes; Paulo Roberto Salle	-	Hélio M. Cangueiro; João A. Amaral; Henri	-
2000	(Brazil) Jean Azevedo	Reinaldo Varela; Alberto Fadigatti	-	André Azevedo; Hélio Cangueiro	-
2001	Tiago Laurito Fantozzi	Édio Fuchter; Milton Pereira	-	Alfredo Yan de Andrade; João Guilherme	-
2002	(Brazil) Jean Azevedo	Édio Fuchter; Milton Pereira	-	André Azevedo; Robson Pereira	-
2003	(Brazil) José Hélio G. R. Fillo	Guilherme Spinelli; Marcelo Vivolo	-	Carlos Salvini; Guido Salvini	-
2004	(Brazil) Jean Azevedo	Guilherme Spinelli; Marcelo Vivolo	-	André Azevedo; Robson P. de Oliveira	-
2005	(Brazil) Jean Azevedo	Edú Piano; Rogério Almeida	Robert Naji Nahas	Amable Barrasa; José Papacena Neto	-
2006	(France) Cyril Despres	João A. Franciosi; Rafael Capoani	Carlo Collet	Amable Barrasa; José Papacena Neto; Domenico Montalbano	-
2007	(Brazil) José Hélio	Mauricio Neves; Clécio Maestreli	Mauricio Costa Ramos	Edu Paino; Solon Mendes; Davi Fonseca	-
2008	(Brazil) José Hélio	(South Africa) Giniel de Villiers (Germany) Dirk Von Zitzewitz	Robert Naji Nahas	Edú Piano; Solon Mendes; Davi Fonseca	-
2009	(Brazil) José Hélio	(Spain) Carlos Sainz (Spain) Lucas Cruz	Cristiano Sousa	Edú Piano; Solon M. Davi Fonseca	-
2010	(Spain) Marc Coma	Guilherme Spinelli; Youssef Haddad	(Poland) Rafal Sonik	Marcos Cassol; Rodrigo Mello; Davi Fonseca	-
2011	(France) Cyril Despres	Guilherme Spinelli; Youssef Haddad	Tom Rosa	Edú Piano; Solon Mendes; Davi Fonseca	Guido Salvini Netto; Flavio Bisi; Fernando Chwaigert
2012	Felipe Zanol	(France) S. Peterhansel (France) J.P. Cottret	Marcelo Medeiros	Carlos Policarpo; Romulo Seccomandi; Davi Fonseca	Guido Salvini Netto; Flavio Bisi; Fernando Chwaigert
2013	Paulo Gonçalves	(France) S. Peterhansel (France) J.P. Cottret	Robert Nahas	Edu Piano; Solon Mendes; Antônio Sales	
2014	Marc Coma	Guiga Spinelli; Youssef Haddad	Robert Nahas	Edu Piano; Solon Mendes; Antônio Sales	
2015	Jean Azevedo	Reinaldo Varela; Gustavo Gugelmin	Marcelo Medeiros		
2016	Gregorio Caselani	Cristian Baumgart; Beco Andreotti	Edgley Sobrinho		
2017	(Brazil) Jean Azevedo	Cristian Baumgart; Beco Andreotti	Diogo Zonato		
2018	Tunico Maciel	Cristian Baumgart; Beco Andreotti	Wescley Dutra		
2019	Tunico Maciel	Lucas Moraes; Kaique Bentivoglio	Marcelo Medeiros		Denisio Nascimento; Idali Bosse
2020	Ricardo Martins	Marcos Baumgart; Kleber Cincea			
2021	(France) Adrien Metge	Cristian Baumgart; Beco Andreotti	(Argentina) Manuel Andújar		Denísio Casarini; Ivo Meyer
2022	Bissinho Zavatti	Lucas Moraes; Kaique Bentivoglio			Rodrigo Varela; Matheus Mazzei
2023	Mason Klein	Marcelo Gastaldi; Cadu Sachs			Deni do Nascimento; Gunnar Dums
