= FIM Cross-Country Rallies World Championship =

Motorcycle racing championship

- Category: Rally raid
- Country: International
- Inaugural season: 1999
- Folded: 2021
- Last Riders' champion: (Austria) Matthias Walkner (moto) (2021) (Argentina) Manuel Andújar (quad) (2021)
- Last Makes' champion: KTM (moto); Yamaha (quad)
- Official website: Official website

The FIM Cross-Country Rallies World Championship was the premier championship of rally raid racing, organized by the Fédération Internationale de Motocyclisme (FIM), from 1999 to 2021 (from 1999 and 2002 as World Cup). Asides the main championship, there were World Cups for the following categories: Quads, Women, Junior, and over 450 cc.

The Cross-Country Rallies World Championship was contested for the first time in 1999. It was organized by FIM with the aim joining in a unique calendar the numerous cross-country rallies disputed all over the world in a totally uncoordinated way. The trophy awarded in early seasons was a simple "world cup", but the large participation of drivers since the first edition pushed the FIM to set up a few years later a real "world championship".

A separate competition exists for "baja" style rally raids called the FIM Bajas World Cup.

From 2022, the cup merged with the FIA World Cup for Cross-Country Rallies to become the World Rally-Raid Championship.

== Winners ==
Season	Rider (Moto)			
	World Cup			
1999	(France) Thierry Magnaldi (KTM)			
2000	(Italy) Fabrizio Meoni (KTM)			
2001	(Chile) Carlo de Gavardo (KTM)			
2002	(France) Richard Sainct (KTM)			
	World Championship			
	Open		450cc	
2003	(France) Cyril Despres (KTM)		N/A	
2004	(Norway) Pål Anders Ullevålseter (KTM)		(Chile) Carlo de Gavardo (KTM)	
2005	(Spain) Marc Coma (KTM)		(Chile) Carlo de Gavardo (KTM)	
2006	(Spain) Marc Coma (KTM)		(Chile) Francisco López Contardo (Honda)	
2007	(Spain) Marc Coma (KTM)		(Poland) Jacek Czachor (KTM)	
	Open Production	Open Sport	450cc Production	450cc Sport
2008	(Poland) Marek Dabrowski (KTM)	(Italy) Oscar Polli (KTM)	(Poland) Jacek Czachor (KTM)	(Spain) Víctor Rivera (Pacific)
	Open (Overall)			
2009	(France) Cyril Despres (KTM)			
	Open		450cc	
2010	(Spain) Marc Coma (KTM)		(France) David Casteu (Sherco)	
	450cc World Championship			
2011	(Portugal) Hélder Rodrigues (Yamaha)			
2012	(Spain) Marc Coma (KTM)			
2013	(Portugal) Paulo Gonçalves (Honda)			
2014	(Spain) Marc Coma (KTM)			
2015	(Austria) Matthias Walkner (KTM)			
2016	(Chile) Pablo Quintanilla (Husqvarna)			
2017	(Chile) Pablo Quintanilla (Husqvarna)			
2018	(Australia) Toby Price (KTM)			
2019	(United Kingdom) Sam Sunderland (KTM)			
	RallyGP World Championship			
2020	Cancelled due to COVID-19 pandemic			
2021	(Austria) Matthias Walkner (KTM)			
2022–present	World Rally-Raid Championship			

=== Quads World Cup ===
Season	Rider (Quad)
2005	(Portugal) Ricardo Leal Dos Santos (Yamaha)
2006	(France) Cristophe Declerck (KTM)
2007	(Netherlands) Sebastian Husseini (Suzuki)
2008	(Tunisia) Karim Dilou (Yamaha)
2009	(France) Lionel Laine (KTM)
2010	(Poland) Rafał Sonik (Yamaha)
2011	(Russia) Dmitry Pavlov (Honda)
2012	(Poland) Łukasz Łaskawiec (Yamaha)
2013	(Poland) Rafał Sonik (Honda)
2014	(Poland) Rafał Sonik (Yamaha)
2015	(Poland) Rafał Sonik (Yamaha)
2016	(Poland) Rafał Sonik (Honda)
2017	(Netherlands) Kees Koolen (Barren)
2018	(Russia) Aleksandr Maksimov (Yamaha)
2019	(Poland) Rafał Sonik (Yamaha)
2020	Cancelled due to COVID-19 pandemic
2021	(Argentina) Manuel Andújar (Yamaha)

=== Women's World Cup ===
Season	Rider (Moto)
2003	(Germany) Katryn Lyda (KTM)
2004	N/A
2005	N/A
2006	N/A
2007	N/A
2008	N/A
2009	(Italy) Camelia Liparoti (KTM)
2010	(Italy) Camelia Liparoti (KTM)
2011	(Italy) Camelia Liparoti (Yamaha)
2012	(Italy) Camelia Liparoti (Yamaha)
2013	(Italy) Camelia Liparoti (Yamaha)
2014	(Italy) Camelia Liparoti (Yamaha)
2015	(Russia) Anastasiya Nifontova (Husqvarna)
2016	(Spain) Laia Sanz (KTM)
2017	(Spain) Laia Sanz (KTM)
2018	N/A
2019	(Spain) Laia Sanz (KTM)
2020	Cancelled due to COVID-19 pandemic
2021	Anastasiya Nifontova (Husqvarna)

In 2021 Anastasiya Nifontova competed as a neutral competitor using the designation MFR (Motorcycle Federation of Russia), as the Court of Arbitration for Sport upheld a ban on Russia competing at World Championships. The ban was implemented by the World Anti-Doping Agency in response to state-sponsored doping program of Russian athletes.

=== Junior World Cup ===
Season	Rider (Quad)
2012	(Poland) Łukasz Łaskawiec (Yamaha)
2013	(Qatar) Mohammed Abu Issa (Yamaha)
2014	(Poland) Jakub Piatek (KTM)
2015	(Poland) Jakub Piatek (KTM)
2016	(Chile) José Ignacio Cornejo (KTM)
2017	(Poland) Maciej Giemza (KTM)
2018	(Poland) Maciej Giemza (KTM)
2019	(Argentina) Luciano Benavides (KTM)
2020	Cancelled due to COVID-19 pandemic
2021	(Poland) Konrad Dabrowski (KTM)

=== Veteran Trophy ===
Season	Rider (Manufacturer)
2016	(Poland) Rafał Sonik (Yamaha)
2017	(Netherlands) Kees Koolen (Barren)
2018	(Poland) Rafał Sonik (Yamaha)
2019	(Poland) Rafał Sonik (Yamaha)
2020	Cancelled due to COVID-19 pandemic
2021	(United Kingdom) David McBride (KTM)

=== Other World Cups and Trophies ===
Season	Rider (Moto)			
	World Cup			
	Open Production	Open Sport	450cc Production	450cc Sport
2009	(Poland) Jacek Czachor (KTM)	(France) Cyril Despres (KTM)	(Italy) Daniel Carmignani (Honda)	(France) Olivier Pain (Yamaha)
	Production Trophy			
2010	(Germany) Tim Trenker (KTM)			
	Open Trophy			
2011	(Poland) Marek Dabrowski (KTM)			
2012	(Poland) Jacek Czachor (KTM)			
2013	(Bolivia) Juan Carlos Salvatierra (Honda)			
	World Cup			Trophy
	Rally2 Moto-Rally		SSV	Adventure
2020	Cancelled due to COVID-19 pandemic			
2021	(Italy) Carlo Cabini (Honda)		(Brazil) Leandro Torres (Brazil) Joaõ Arena (Polaris)	(Italy) Carlo Cabini (Honda)
