= Matthias Walkner =

Austrian motorcycle racer

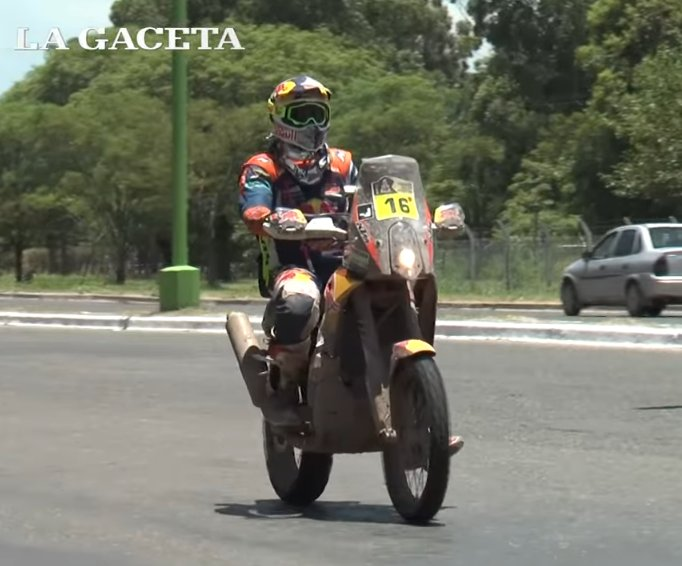
- Matthias Walkner in Dakar 2016.

Personal information
- Born: 1 September 1986 (age 39) Kuchl, Austria

Sport
- Country: Austria
- Sport: Motorsport
- Event: Rally raid

Achievements and titles
- World finals: 1 Dakar Rally; 1 MX3 Motocross; 1 Cross-Country Rallies
Medal record
Rally raid
| Event | 1st | 2nd | 3rd |
|---|---|---|---|
| Dakar Rally | 1 | 2 | 0 |
| Rallye du Maroc | 1 | 1 | 0 |
| Sardegna Rally Race | 1 | 0 | 0 |
| Abu Dhabi Desert Challenge | 0 | 0 | 1 |
| Total | 3 | 3 | 1 |

Matthias Walkner (born 1 September 1986) is an Austrian rally raid biker and former motocross rider, official driver of the team Red Bull KTM Factory for the Dakar Rally.

== Biography ==
Walkner won the 2012 FIM Motocross World Championship (MX3 class) and 2015 FIM Cross-Country Rallies World Championship. As single race of the world championship (cross-country), he has won 2015 Sardegna Rally Race and 2017 Rallye OiLibya du Maroc.

== Dakar Rally ==
| Year | Bike | Rank | Stages |
|---|---|---|---|
| 2015 | KTM 450 Rally | DNF | 1 |
| 2016 | KTM 450 Rally | DNF | 0 |
| 2017 | KTM 450 Rally | 2nd | 1 |
| 2018 | KTM 450 Rally | 1st | 1 |
| 2019 | KTM 450 Rally | 2nd | 2 |
| 2020 | KTM 450 Rally | 5th | 0 |
| 2021 | KTM 450 Rally | 9th | 0 |
| 2022 | KTM 450 Rally | 3rd | 0 |

Sporting positions
| Preceded by Sam Sunderland | Dakar Rally; Motorcycle Winner; 2018 | Succeeded by Toby Price |
