= Pablo Quintanilla =

Chilean motorcycle racer

- Born: 10 December 1986 (age 39) Valparaíso, Chile
- Teams: Honda

Championship titles
- 2016, 2017: FIM Cross-Country Rallies World Championship

Pablo Quintanilla (born 10 December 1986) is a Chilean motorcycle racer who specializes in enduro and rally raid, and a member of the Monster Energy Honda Team. He is one of the most outstanding Chilean rally raid riders in history, along with Carlo de Gavardo, Chaleco López and Ignacio Casale, having won the FIM Cross-Country Rallies World Championship in 2016 and 2017.
