= Sam Sunderland =

British motorcycle racer

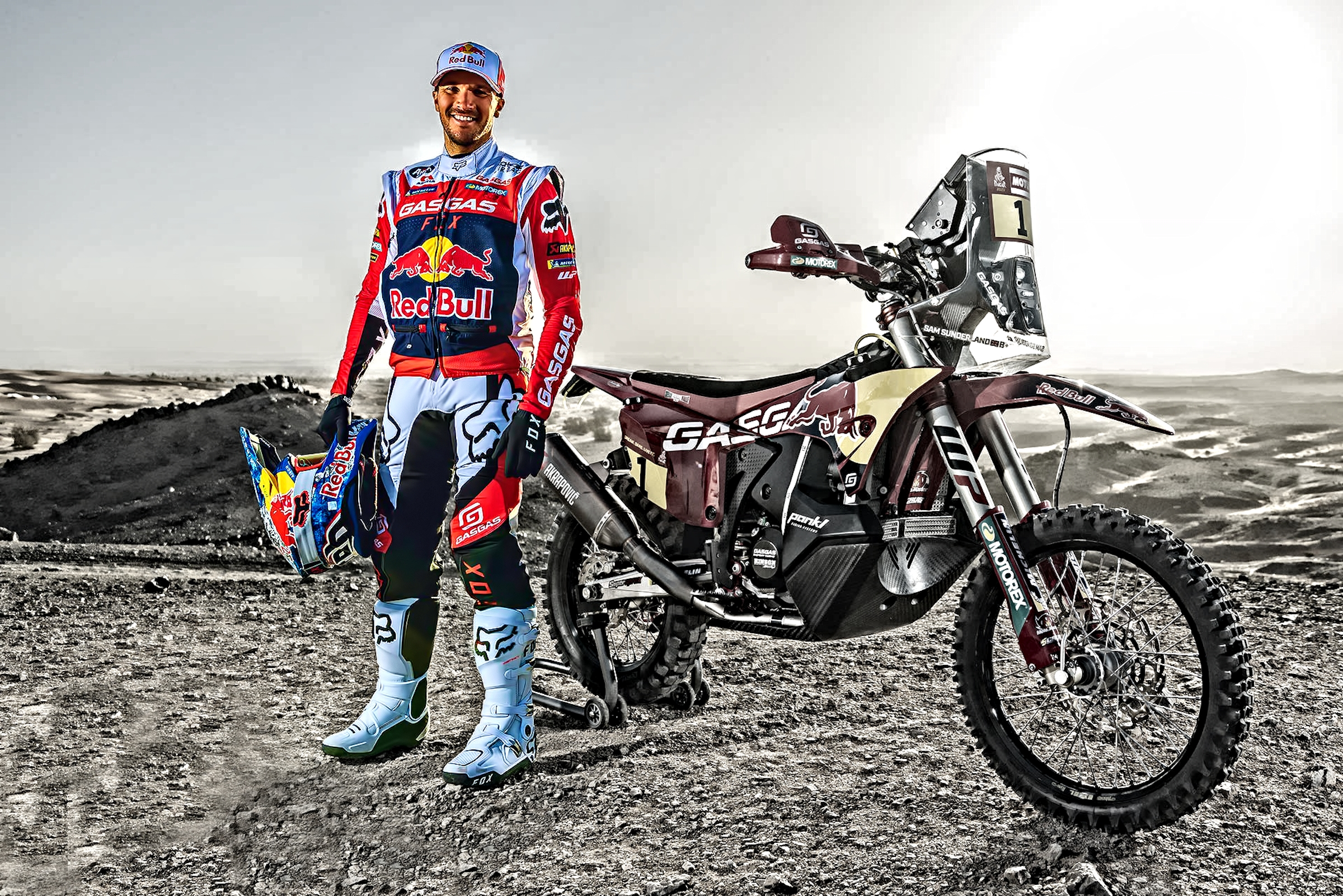
- Born: 15 April 1989 (age 37) United Kingdom

Dakar Rally career
- Debut season: 2012
- Current team: Gas Gas Factory Racing
- Former teams: Red Bull KTM Factory Racing
- Wins: 2017 Dakar Rally; 2022 Dakar Rally

Championship titles
- 2019 2022: FIM Cross-Country Rallies World Championship; World Rally-Raid Championship (RallyGP)

Sam Sunderland (born 15 April 1989 in Poole) is a Dubai-based British rally raid motorcycle rider, best known for his participation in the Dakar Rally, which he won in 2017 and 2022.

== Career ==
Sunderland made his Dakar debut in 2012, riding a Honda, after winning the UAE National Baja Championship in 2010 and 2011. He was forced to retire on the third stage due to an electrical fault, and was unable to compete the following year after breaking both wrists in testing prior to the event.

Riding for the factory Honda team in 2014, Sunderland became the first British rider to win a stage of the Dakar since John Deacon in 1998 when he won the second stage to move up to third in the overall classification, only to suffer engine failure the following day and drop out of the rally. Later that year, he was signed to the factory KTM team, winning two stages of the Abu Dhabi Desert Challenge and placing second in the Morocco Rally. Sunderland went on to win Morocco rally in 2015 and won Qatar sealine rally in 2016. He won the Dakar Rally in 2017.

Sunderland was the recipient of the Royal Automobile Club's 2017 Segrave Trophy "for being the first Briton to win a Dakar Rally crown by winning the motorcycle category in 2017".

In 2018 Dakar Rally, Sunderland won stages 1 and 3 before crashing out in stage 4. The 2019 Dakar Rally saw him win stages 5 and 7, and finish third overall. In 2020 edition in Saudi Arabia, Sunderland crashed out with an injury in stage 5.

In 2022, Sunderland won first place in the Dakar Rally for the second time since his previous win in 2017.

== Career results ==
=== Dakar Rally ===
Year	Class	Vehicle	Position	Stages won
2012	Motorbike	(Japan) Honda	DNF	0
2014	Motorbike	(Japan) Honda	DNF	1
2015	Motorbike	(Austria) KTM	DNF	1
2017	Motorbike	(Austria) KTM	1st	1
2018	Motorbike	(Austria) KTM	DNF	2
2019	Motorbike	(Austria) KTM	3rd	2
2020	Motorbike	(Austria) KTM	DNF	0
2021	Motorbike	(Austria) KTM	3rd	1
2022	Motorbike	(Spain) Gas Gas	1st	1
2023	Motorbike	(Spain) Gas Gas	DNF	0
2024	Motorbike	(Spain) Gas Gas	DNF	0

Sporting positions
Preceded by Toby Price	Dakar Rally; Motorcycle Winner; 2017	Succeeded by Matthias Walkner
Preceded by Kevin Benavides	Dakar Rally; Motorcycle Winner; 2022	Succeeded by Kevin Benavides
