= KTM 450 Rally =

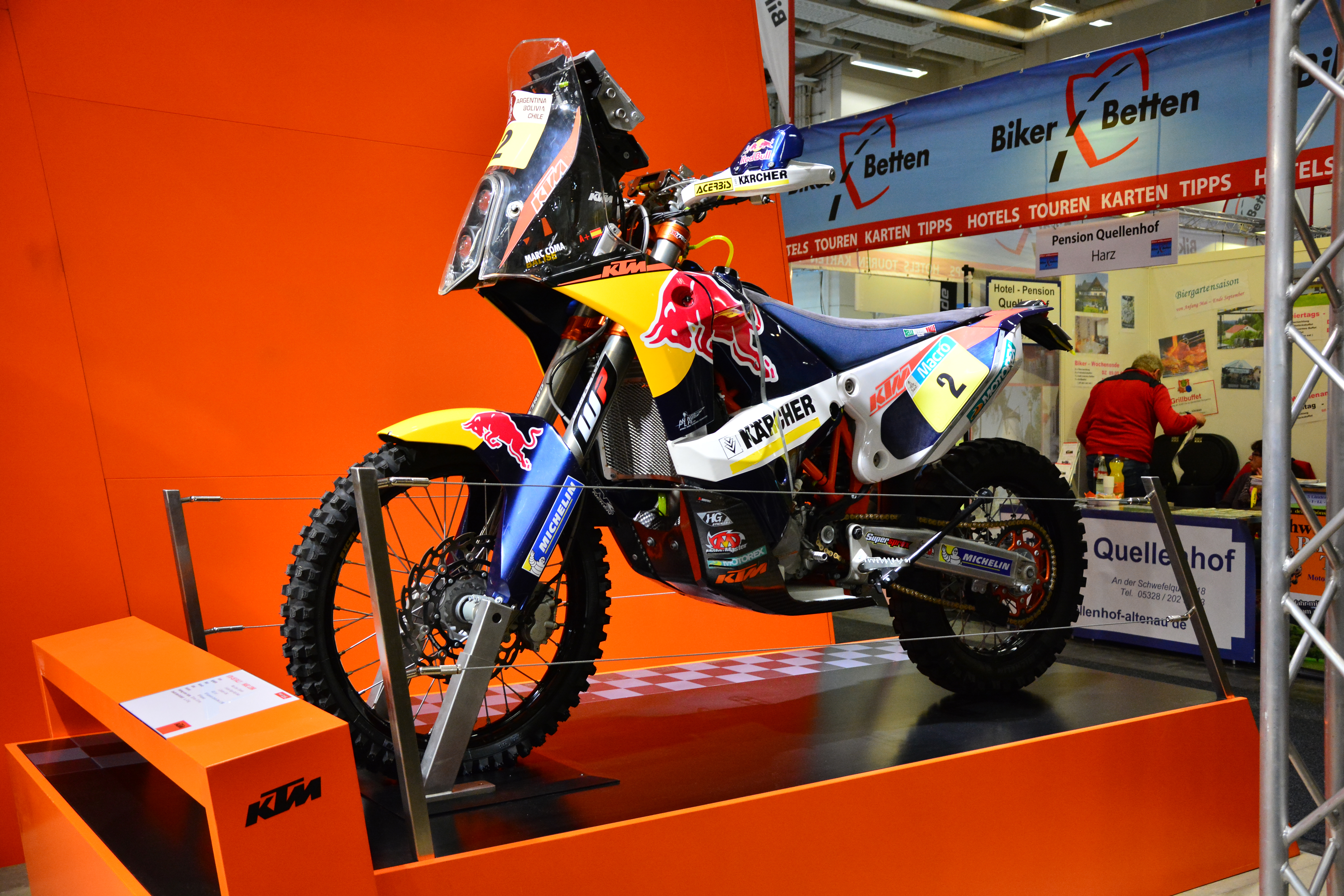
- KTM 450 Rally (Red Bull team) who won 2015 Dakar Rally
- Manufacturer: KTM
- Production: 2011–
- Assembly: Austria
- Predecessor: KTM 690 Rally

KTM 450 Rally is a rally raid bike produced by Austrian manufacturer KTM from 2011 with the specific task of winning the Dakar Rally, that has won nine times in eleven participations.

== Model Progression ==
The first generation of the 450 Rally was essentially a 690 Rally with a 450 engine due to a late rule change for the 2011 Dakar Rally.

For model year 2014 the bike was totally redesigned making it lighter, slimmer, and better handling than the previous generation.

2019 bought further changes to overall improve weight distribution including a new swingarm, linkage, and shock absorber with a new airbox, fuel tanks, and seat. There were also changes to the Akrapovic exhaust making it shorter and lower as well as increased power coming from a revised cylinder head, new fuel injection system, and new transmission.

KTM produced badge-engineered variants of the bike for its subsidiary brands: the Husqvarna FR450 Rally from 2021 to 2024, and the GasGas RX 450 Rally from 2022 to 2024. Due to on-going financial problems for the company, KTM ceased production of the derivative models for 2025, entering bikes only under the parent brand.

== Rally Dakar podium ==
Gold medal	Silver medal	Bronze medal
11	7	5

== See also ==
- KTM 950 Super Enduro R
