= Paulo Gonçalves (motorcyclist) =

Portuguese motorcyclist (1979–2020)

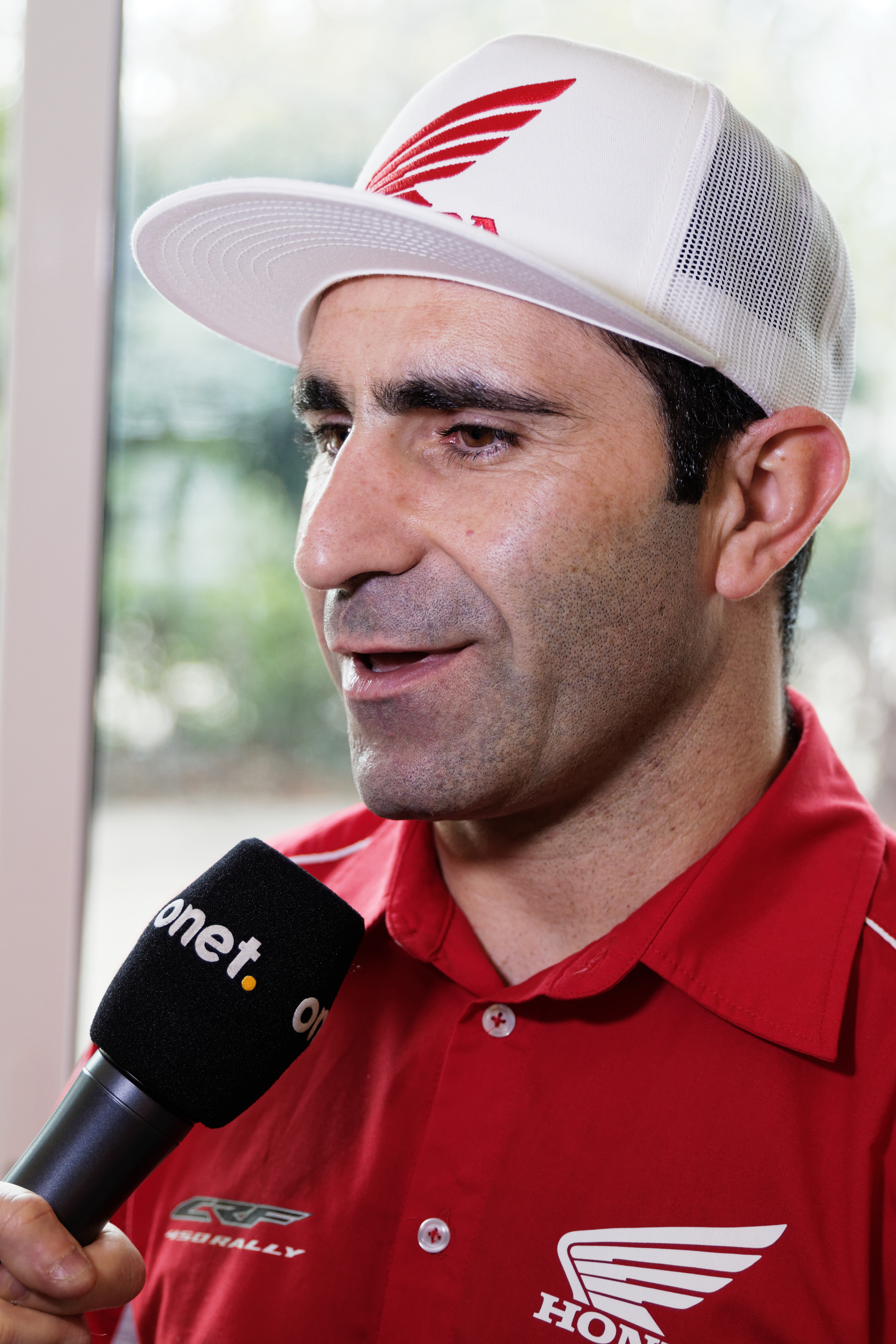
- Gonçalves in an interview for the 2016 Dakar Rally
- Nationality: Portuguese
- Born: 5 February 1979 Gemeses, Portugal
- Died: 12 January 2020 (aged 40) Layla, Saudi Arabia
- Teams: Hero
- Championships: FIM Cross-Country Rallies World Championship
- Wins: 2013

Paulo Gonçalves ([ˈpawlu ɣõˈsalvɨʃ]; 5 February 1979 – 12 January 2020) was a Portuguese rally racing motorcycle rider. He won the FIM Cross-Country Rallies World Championship in 2013.

== Early life ==
Gonçalves was born on 5 February 1979, in Gemeses, a civil parish in the Braga District city of Esposende in Portugal.

== Rally biking ==
Gonçalves won 23 titles in motocross, supercross and enduro, and won the FIM Cross-Country Rallies World Championship in 2013, before being a runner-up in 2014. He started participating in the Dakar Rally in 2006, and participated in thirteen of them. He raced on African, South American and Asian continents and won three stages. He finished among the top ten competitors, and was the runner-up in 2015, Marc Coma being the only competitor ahead of him.

Between 2006 and 2009, and also from 2013 to 2019, Gonçalves raced for the Honda team in the Dakar Rally, before moving to the Hero MotoCorp team in 2020. From 2010 to 2012, he was with the BMW-owned Husqvarna Motorcycles team outfit. He was also a member of the KTM team during his career. During the 2020 edition of the Dakar rally, the engine stalled in the third stage, and its withdrawal was announced, which was corrected about three hours later, as Gonçalves was trying to repair his vehicle at the same time as he was waiting for his team to arrive for assistance. Due to his taste for high speeds, he was nicknamed "Speedy", which was a reference to the Looney Tunes character Speedy Gonzales.

== Death and tributes ==
Gonçalves crashed during the seventh stage of the 2020 Dakar Rally in Saudi Arabia, at 276 km. He was found unconscious, resuscitated at the scene, and then flown by helicopter to a hospital in Layla, where he was pronounced dead. He was less than a month away from his 41st birthday.

After Gonçalves' death, the municipality of Esposende issued a note of regret, highlighting his career as a racer, and regarded him as an Esposende ambassador to the world. His death was also mourned by the President of Portugal, Marcelo Rebelo de Sousa, who stated that Gonçalves "died trying to achieve the dream of winning one of the hardest and most dangerous rally events in the world, in which he was always a worthy representative of Portugal, reaching second place in 2015".
