= 2018 Dakar Rally =

Off-road motorsport event in Peru, Bolivia, and Argentina

Part of the Dakar Rally
← Previous event	Next event →
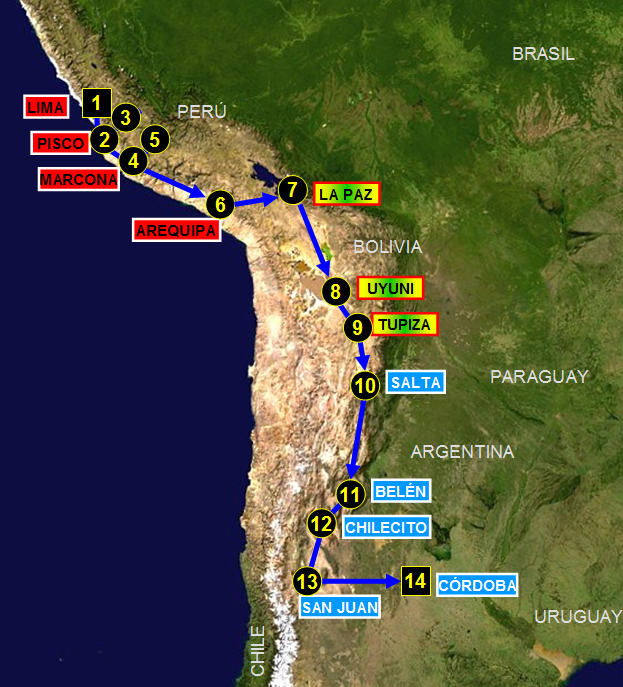
- 2018 Dakar route
- Host country: Peru; Bolivia; Argentina
- Dates run: 6–20 January 2018
- Start: (Peru) Lima
- Finish: (Argentina) Córdoba
- Stages: 14
- Stage surface: Gravel, dirt, sand

Results
- Cars winner: (Spain) Carlos Sainz (Spain) Lucas Cruz; Team Peugeot Total
- Bikes winner: (Austria) Matthias Walkner; Red Bull KTM Factory Racing
- Quads winner: (Chile) Ignacio Casale; Casale Racing
- Trucks winner: (Russia) Eduard Nikolaev (Russia) Evgeny Yakovlev (Russia) Vladimir Rybakov; Kamaz-Master
- UTVs winner: (Brazil) Reinaldo Varela (Brazil) Gustavo Gugelmin; South Racing-Can Am
- Crews: 335 at start, 184 at finish

The 2018 Dakar Rally was the 40th edition of the event and the tenth successive year that the event was in South America. The event started in Lima, Peru on 6 January and ran through Argentina and Bolivia, finishing in Córdoba, Argentina on 20 January after 14 stages of competition.

== Number of entries ==
Stage	Bikes	Quads	Cars	Trucks	UTVs	Total
Start of rally	139	49	92	44	11	335
Rest day	110	41	62	23	10	246
End of rally	85 (61%)	32 (65%)	43 (47%)	18 (41%)	6 (54%)	184 (55%)

== Stages ==
Distance according to the official website.

=== Bikes, quads and cars ===
Stage	Date	Depart	Arrive	Bikes			Quads	Cars		
Stage	Date	Depart	Arrive	Km	Km	Winner	Winner	Km	Km	Winner
1	6 Jan	(Peru) Lima	(Peru) Pisco	272	31	(United Kingdom) S. Sunderland (KTM)	(Chile) I. Casale (Yamaha)	272	31	(Qatar) N. Al-Attiyah (Toyota)
2	7 Jan	(Peru) Pisco	(Peru) Pisco	278	267	(Spain) J. Barreda (Honda)	(Chile) I. Casale (Yamaha)	278	267	(France) C. Despres (Peugeot)
3	8 Jan	(Peru) Pisco	(Peru) San Juan de Marcona	501	295	(United Kingdom) S. Sunderland (KTM)	(Chile) I. Casale (Yamaha)	502	295	(Qatar) N. Al-Attiyah (Toyota)
4	9 Jan	(Peru) San Juan de Marcona	(Peru) San Juan de Marcona	444	330	(France) A. van Beveren (Yamaha)	(Russia) S. Karyakin (Yamaha)	444	330	(France) S. Loeb (Peugeot)
5	10 Jan	(Peru) San Juan de Marcona	(Peru) Arequipa	770	264	(Spain) J. Barreda (Honda)	(Argentina) N. Cavigliasso (Yamaha)	932	267	(France) S. Peterhansel (Peugeot)
6	11 Jan	(Peru) Arequipa	(Bolivia) La Paz	758	313	(France) A. Meo (KTM)	(Argentina) J. Gonzalez (Yamaha)	758	313	(Spain) C. Sainz (Peugeot)
	12 Jan	(Bolivia) La Paz – rest day								
7^{M}	13 Jan	(Bolivia) La Paz	(Bolivia) Uyuni	726	425	(Spain) J. Barreda (Honda)	(France) A. Dutrie (Yamaha)	726	425	(Spain) C. Sainz (Peugeot)
8	14 Jan	(Bolivia) Uyuni	(Bolivia) Tupiza	584	498	(France) A. Meo (KTM)	(France) S. Vitse (Yamaha)	584	498	(France) S. Peterhansel (Peugeot)
9	15 Jan	(Bolivia) Tupiza	(Argentina) Salta	754	242	Cancelled due to poor weather conditions.		754	242	Cancelled
10	16 Jan	(Argentina) Salta	(Argentina) Belén	795	372	(Austria) M. Walkner (KTM)	(Russia) S. Karyakin (Yamaha)	795	372	(France) S. Peterhansel (Peugeot)
11	17 Jan	(Argentina) Belén	(Argentina) Fiambalá/Chilecito	484	280	(Australia) T. Price (KTM)	(Argentina) N. Cavigliasso (Yamaha)	746	280	(Netherlands) B. ten Brinke (Toyota)
12	18 Jan	(Argentina) Fiambalá/Chilecito	(Argentina) San Juan	722	375	Cancelled due to poor weather conditions.		791	522	(Qatar) N. Al-Attiyah (Toyota)
13	19 Jan	(Argentina) San Juan	(Argentina) Córdoba	904	423	(Australia) T. Price (KTM)	(Argentina) J. González (Yamaha)	927	368	(Qatar) N. Al-Attiyah (Toyota)
14	20 Jan	(Argentina) Córdoba	(Argentina) Córdoba	284	119	(Argentina) K. Benavides (Honda)	(Chile) I. Casale (Yamaha)	284	119	(South Africa) G. de Villiers (Toyota)

=== Trucks and UTVs ===
Stage	Date	Depart	Arrive	Trucks			UTVs		
Stage	Date	Depart	Arrive	Km	Km	Winner	Km	Km	Winner
1	6 Jan	(Peru) Lima	(Peru) Pisco	272	31	(Czech Republic) A. Loprais (Tatra)	272	31	(Peru) A. Aliaga (Polaris)
2	7 Jan	(Peru) Pisco	(Peru) Pisco	278	267	(Russia) E. Nikolaev (Kamaz)	278	267	(Brazil) R. Varela (Can-Am)
3	8 Jan	(Peru) Pisco	(Peru) San Juan de Marcona	502	295	(Argentina) F. Villagra (Iveco)	502	295	(Peru) J.C. Uribe (Can-Am)
4	9 Jan	(Peru) San Juan de Marcona	(Peru) San Juan de Marcona	444	330	(Russia) E. Nikolaev (Kamaz)	444	330	(France) P. Garrouste (Polaris)
5	10 Jan	(Peru) San Juan de Marcona	(Peru) Arequipa	932	267	(Russia) A. Mardeev (Kamaz)	932	267	(Brazil) R. Varela (Can-Am)
6	11 Jan	(Peru) Arequipa	(Bolivia) La Paz	758	313	(Argentina) F. Villagra (Iveco)	758	313	(France) P. Garrouste (Polaris)
	12 Jan	(Bolivia) La Paz – rest day							
7^{M}	13 Jan	(Bolivia) La Paz	(Bolivia) Uyuni	669	368	(Netherlands) T. van Genugten (Iveco)	726	425	(Brazil) R. Varela (Can-Am)
8	14 Jan	(Bolivia) Uyuni	(Bolivia) Tupiza	558	380	(Russia) D. Sotnikov (Kamaz)	584	498	(Brazil) R. Varela (Can-Am)
9	15 Jan	(Bolivia) Tupiza	(Argentina) Salta	754	242	Cancelled	754	242	Cancelled
10	16 Jan	(Argentina) Salta	(Argentina) Belén	795	372	(Netherlands) T. van Genugten (Iveco)	795	372	(France) P. Garrouste (Polaris)
11	17 Jan	(Argentina) Belén	(Argentina) Fiambalá/Chilecito	746	280	(Belarus) S. Viazovich (Maz)	746	280	(France) P. Garrouste (Polaris)
12	18 Jan	(Argentina) Fiambalá/Chilecito	(Argentina) San Juan	791	522	(Netherlands) T. van Genugten (Iveco)	791	522	(Brazil) R. Varela (Can-Am)
13	19 Jan	(Argentina) San Juan	(Argentina) Córdoba	927	368	(Russia) E. Nikolaev (Kamaz)	927	368	(France) P. Garrouste (Polaris)
14	20 Jan	(Argentina) Córdoba	(Argentina) Córdoba	284	119	(Netherlands) T. van Genugten (Iveco)	284	119	(Argentina) L. Larrauri (Can-Am)

== Summary ==
Stage 1 left from Lima on 6 January from the Army General Headquarters (the "Pentagonito") located in the district of San Borja, and extended 273 kilometers to the south, a few kilometers after Pisco taking the South Pan-American Highway. The competitive section consisted of a loop ran in the last 31 kilometers near Pisco. Among the incidents of the stage, the most highlighted was the serious accident suffered by the Portuguese driver Joaquim Rodrigues when he fell from a dune and fractured a lumbar vertebra.

The oldest driver, 76-year old Yoshimasa Sugawara of Japan retired in his 35th Dakar Rally participation on Stage 2. The Toyota of driver Alicia Reina and co-driver Carlos Dante Pelayo, both of Argentina, was burned after catching fire during the Stage 3 in Pisco, Peru. Two-time winner Nani Roma of Spain also retired at the end of Stage 3 when he had sustained head and neck injuries in a crash.

Big troubles on Stage 4 was for two of the favorites, Nasser Al-Attiyah (Team Toyota) and Cyril Despres (Team Peugeot) that have been significantly delayed. The bikes class leader and defending champion Sam Sunderland was airlifted to hospital by helicopter as he quit the race with a frightening back injury. Also, former Chelsea and Tottenham manager André Villas-Boas was taken to hospital when his car crashed into a sand dune, forcing him to retire from the rally.

Notable retirement on Stage 5 was Sébastien Loeb (Peugeot Team Total) due to an injury of his co-driver Daniel Elena. In the quads category, defending champion Sergey Karyakin suffered a crash and broke his arm. Initially, Stage 5 in the truck category was won by class leader Eduard Nikolaev, but later Ayrat Mardeev and Dmitry Sotnikov received a compensation time and took first and second stage positions respectively.

After the rest day, one of bike class favorites Joan Barreda won the Stage 7 by almost three minutes to creep ever closer to the overall lead, but sustained a knee injury. Car class leader Stéphane Peterhansel had a big troubles on Stage 7, hitting a rock that destroyed the left rear corner of his Peugeot and forced him to stop for almost two hours. Despite losing two positions in general standings, Peterhansel come back to fight with Carlos Sainz by winning Stage 8 in southern Bolivia. Stage 9 has been cancelled due to poor weather conditions in Argentina.

Bike class leader Adrien van Beveren could not finish on Stage 10 despite his efforts to keep going after he fell two miles from the finish. Austrian Matthias Walkner takes the advantage of the navigation error made by several rivals. On Stage 11, Joan Barreda, exhausted and nursing a knee injury for the last four days, has withdrawn from the rally despite sitting in second place. Russian Kamaz truck driver Eduard Nikolaev has dominated since the rally start in Peru, but he lost more than 40 minutes on a difficult Stage 11 to new race leader Federico Villagra.

Heavy rain made conditions bad enough that the bike and quad classes were both cancelled for Stage 12. In the truck class, Kamaz's defending champion Eduard Nikolaev closely overhauled Federico Villagra's Iveco to lead the overall standings by just one second before the last two stages. On Stage 3, Villagra attacked but suffered a mechanical troubles and despite battling on for as long as he could, had to abandon the rally, leaving the Russian in total control. In the same time, 13-time champion Peterhansel crashed on Stage 13, damaging the Peugeot 3008 DKR Maxi and lost an hour and his second place in general classification.

Finally, after last short Stage 14, Spanish Carlos Sainz has won the cars class for the second time, the bikes winner was Austrian Matthias Walkner, the quads winner was Chilean Ignacio Casale, the trucks winner was Russian Eduard Nikolaev and the UTVs winner was Brazilian Reinaldo Varela.

== Stage results ==
=== Cars ===
Stage	Stage winner	Time	Stage runner-up	Time	Stage third place	Time	Class leader
1	(Qatar) Nasser Al-Attiyah (Toyota)	0:21:51	(Netherlands) Bernhard ten Brinke (Toyota)	0:22:16	(Peru) Nicolás Fuchs (Borgward)	0:22:25	(Qatar) Nasser Al-Attiyah (Toyota)
2	(France) Cyril Despres (Peugeot)	2:56:51	(France) Stéphane Peterhansel (Peugeot)	2:57:39	(France) Sébastien Loeb (Peugeot)	2:59:59	(France) Cyril Despres (Peugeot)
3	(Qatar) Nasser Al-Attiyah (Toyota)	3:09:08	(France) Stéphane Peterhansel (Peugeot)	3:13:13	(Spain) Carlos Sainz (Peugeot)	3:15:15	(France) Stéphane Peterhansel (Peugeot)
4	(France) Sébastien Loeb (Peugeot)	3:57:53	(Spain) Carlos Sainz (Peugeot)	3:59:28	(France) Stéphane Peterhansel (Peugeot)	4:01:09	(France) Stéphane Peterhansel (Peugeot)
5	(France) Stéphane Peterhansel (Peugeot)	2:51:19	(Netherlands) Bernhard ten Brinke (Toyota)	2:56:11	(South Africa) Giniel de Villiers (Toyota)	3:04:06	(France) Stéphane Peterhansel (Peugeot)
6	(Spain) Carlos Sainz (Peugeot)	2:53:30	(France) Stéphane Peterhansel (Peugeot)	2:57:36	(Qatar) Nasser Al-Attiyah (Toyota)	2:58:35	(France) Stéphane Peterhansel (Peugeot)
Rest day
7	(Spain) Carlos Sainz (Peugeot)	4:49:26	(South Africa) Giniel de Villiers (Toyota)	5:01:31	(Qatar) Nasser Al-Attiyah (Toyota)	5:03:45	(Spain) Carlos Sainz (Peugeot)
8	(France) Stéphane Peterhansel (Peugeot)	5:15:18	(France) Cyril Despres (Peugeot)	5:16:07	(Qatar) Nasser Al-Attiyah (Toyota)	5:17:30	(Spain) Carlos Sainz (Peugeot)
9	Cancelled due to poor weather conditions						(Spain) Carlos Sainz (Peugeot)
10	(France) Stéphane Peterhansel (Peugeot)	4:43:46	(South Africa) Giniel de Villiers (Toyota)	4:52:32	(Spain) Carlos Sainz (Peugeot)	4:56:53	(Spain) Carlos Sainz (Peugeot)
11	(Netherlands) Bernhard ten Brinke (Toyota)	4:10:54	(France) Cyril Despres (Peugeot)	4:15:29	(Spain) Carlos Sainz (Peugeot)	4:15:34	(Spain) Carlos Sainz (Peugeot)
12	(Qatar) Nasser Al-Attiyah (Toyota)	5:49:57	(France) Stéphane Peterhansel (Peugeot)	5:52:00	(South Africa) Giniel de Villiers (Toyota)	5:54:30	(Spain) Carlos Sainz (Peugeot)
13	(Qatar) Nasser Al-Attiyah (Toyota)	5:02:22	(Argentina) Lucio Alvarez (Toyota)	5:13:38	(South Africa) Giniel de Villiers (Toyota)	5:15:28	(Spain) Carlos Sainz (Peugeot)
14	(South Africa) Giniel de Villiers (Toyota)	1:26:29	(France) Stéphane Peterhansel (Peugeot)	1:27:09	(Qatar) Nasser Al-Attiyah (Toyota)	1:27:10	(Spain) Carlos Sainz (Peugeot)

=== Bikes ===
Stage	Stage winner	Time	Stage runner-up	Time	Stage third place	Time	Class leader
1	(United Kingdom) Sam Sunderland (KTM)	0:20:55	(France) Adrien van Beveren (Yamaha)	0:21:28	(Chile) Pablo Quintanilla (Husqvarna)	0:21:51	(United Kingdom) Sam Sunderland (KTM)
2	(Spain) Joan Barreda (Honda)	2:56:44	(France) Adrien van Beveren (Yamaha)	2:59:38	(Austria) Matthias Walkner (KTM)	3:01:08	(Spain) Joan Barreda (Honda)
3	(United Kingdom) Sam Sunderland (KTM)	3:20:43	(Argentina) Kevin Benavides (Honda)	3:23:46	(Australia) Toby Price (KTM)	3:24:11	(United Kingdom) Sam Sunderland (KTM)
4	(France) Adrien van Beveren (Yamaha)	4:08:23	(France) Xavier de Soultrait (Yamaha)	4:13:24	(Austria) Matthias Walkner (KTM)	4:15:33	(France) Adrien van Beveren (Yamaha)
5	(Spain) Joan Barreda (Honda)	3:19:42	(Austria) Matthias Walkner (KTM)	3:30:08	(Argentina) Kevin Benavides (Honda)	3:32:02	(France) Adrien van Beveren (Yamaha)
6	(France) Antoine Meo (KTM)	1:54:10	(Argentina) Kevin Benavides (Honda)	1:54:40	(Australia) Toby Price (KTM)	1:54:40	(Argentina) Kevin Benavides (Honda)
Rest day
7	(Spain) Joan Barreda (Honda)	5:11:10	(France) Adrien van Beveren (Yamaha)	5:14:01	(Argentina) Kevin Benavides (Honda)	5:19:12	(France) Adrien van Beveren (Yamaha)
8	(France) Antoine Meo (KTM)	5:24:01	(United States) Ricky Brabec (Honda)	5:25:09	(Australia) Toby Price (KTM)	5:26:46	(France) Adrien van Beveren (Yamaha)
9	Cancelled due to poor weather conditions						(France) Adrien van Beveren (Yamaha)
10	(Austria) Matthias Walkner (KTM)	4:52:26	(Chile) Pablo Quintanilla (Husqvarna)	5:04:01	(Spain) Gerard Farrés (KTM)	5:08:47	(Austria) Matthias Walkner (KTM)
11	(Australia) Toby Price (KTM)	4:01:33	(Argentina) Kevin Benavides (Honda)	4:03:11	(France) Antoine Meo (KTM)	4:08:04	(Austria) Matthias Walkner (KTM)
12	Cancelled due to poor weather conditions						(Austria) Matthias Walkner (KTM)
13	(Australia) Toby Price (KTM)	4:48:33	(Argentina) Kevin Benavides (Honda)	4:50:36	(France) Antoine Meo (KTM)	4:51:17	(Austria) Matthias Walkner (KTM)
14	(Argentina) Kevin Benavides (Honda)	1:26:41	(Australia) Toby Price (KTM)	1:27:35	(France) Antoine Meo (KTM)	1:29:30	(Austria) Matthias Walkner (KTM)

=== Quads ===
Stage	Stage winner	Time	Stage runner-up	Time	Stage third place	Time	Class leader
1	(Chile) Ignacio Casale (Yamaha)	0:27:32	(Russia) Sergey Karyakin (Yamaha)	0:28:32	(Argentina) Pablo Copetti (Yamaha)	0:30:31	(Chile) Ignacio Casale (Yamaha)
2	(Chile) Ignacio Casale (Yamaha)	3:37:45	(Russia) Sergey Karyakin (Yamaha)	3:38:28	(Argentina) Gastón González (Yamaha)	3:41:39	(Chile) Ignacio Casale (Yamaha)
3	(Chile) Ignacio Casale (Yamaha)	3:58:08	(Peru) Alexis Hernández (Yamaha)	4:09:03	(Argentina) Pablo Copetti (Yamaha)	4:13:00	(Chile) Ignacio Casale (Yamaha)
4	(Russia) Sergey Karyakin (Yamaha)	4:56:34	(Chile) Ignacio Casale (Yamaha)	4:57:17	(Peru) Alexis Hernández (Yamaha)	5:02:05	(Chile) Ignacio Casale (Yamaha)
5	(Argentina) Nicolás Cavigliasso (Yamaha)	4:12:47	(Chile) Ignacio Casale (Yamaha)	4:14:10	(Peru) Alexis Hernández (Yamaha)	4:19:22	(Chile) Ignacio Casale (Yamaha)
6	(Argentina) Jeremías González (Yamaha)	2:29:06	(Argentina) Pablo Copetti (Yamaha)	2:30:56	(Paraguay) Nelson Sanabria (Yamaha)	2:31:24	(Chile) Ignacio Casale (Yamaha)
Rest day
7	(France) Axel Dutrie (Yamaha)	6:59:04	(Brazil) Marcelo Medeiros (Yamaha)	7:03:54	(Chile) Ignacio Casale (Yamaha)	7:08:02	(Chile) Ignacio Casale (Yamaha)
8	(France) Simon Vitse (Yamaha)	6:52:32	(Brazil) Marcelo Medeiros (Yamaha)	6:55:59	(Chile) Ignacio Casale (Yamaha)	6:57:52	(Chile) Ignacio Casale (Yamaha)
9	Cancelled due to poor weather conditions						(Chile) Ignacio Casale (Yamaha)
10	(Chile) Ignacio Casale (Yamaha)	6:35:18	(Argentina) Nicolás Cavigliasso (Yamaha)	6:35:26	(Argentina) Jeremías González (Yamaha)	6:37:32	(Chile) Ignacio Casale (Yamaha)
11	(Argentina) Nicolás Cavigliasso (Yamaha)	5:20:45	(Chile) Ignacio Casale (Yamaha)	5:35:59	(Kazakhstan) Dmitriy Shilov (Yamaha)	5:55:34	(Chile) Ignacio Casale (Yamaha)
12	Cancelled due to poor weather conditions						(Chile) Ignacio Casale (Yamaha)
13	(Argentina) Jeremías González (Yamaha)	5:55:16	(Paraguay) Nelson Sanabria (Yamaha)	5:58:34	(Chile) Ignacio Casale (Yamaha)	5:59:19	(Chile) Ignacio Casale (Yamaha)
14	(Chile) Ignacio Casale (Yamaha)	1:43:25	(Paraguay) Nelson Sanabria (Yamaha)	1:44:46	(Argentina) Nicolás Cavigliasso (Yamaha)	1:45:01	(Chile) Ignacio Casale (Yamaha)

=== Trucks ===
Stage	Stage winner	Time	Stage runner-up	Time	Stage third place	Time	Class leader
1	(Czech Republic) Aleš Loprais (Tatra)	0:25:15	(Netherlands) Martin van den Brink (Renault Trucks)	0:25:37	(Russia) Eduard Nikolaev (Kamaz)	0:25:44	(Czech Republic) Aleš Loprais (Tatra)
2	(Russia) Eduard Nikolaev (Kamaz)	3:24:23	(Argentina) Federico Villagra (Iveco)	3:27:48	(Czech Republic) Aleš Loprais (Tatra)	3:30:30	(Russia) Eduard Nikolaev (Kamaz)
3	(Argentina) Federico Villagra (Iveco)	3:56:37	(Russia) Eduard Nikolaev (Kamaz)	3:57:12	(Russia) Ayrat Mardeev (Kamaz)	4:00:46	(Russia) Eduard Nikolaev (Kamaz)
4	(Russia) Eduard Nikolaev (Kamaz)	4:35:08	(Argentina) Federico Villagra (Iveco)	5:03:05	(Czech Republic) Martin Kolomý (Tatra)	5:13:57	(Russia) Eduard Nikolaev (Kamaz)
5	(Russia) Ayrat Mardeev (Kamaz)	3:32:39	(Russia) Dmitry Sotnikov (Kamaz)	3:36:35	(Russia) Eduard Nikolaev (Kamaz)	3:37:12	(Russia) Eduard Nikolaev (Kamaz)
6	(Argentina) Federico Villagra (Iveco)	3:22:23	(Czech Republic) Martin Kolomý (Tatra)	3:25:09	(Netherlands) Ton van Genugten (Iveco)	3:25:21	(Russia) Eduard Nikolaev (Kamaz)
Rest day
7	(Netherlands) Ton van Genugten (Iveco)	4:10:40	(Argentina) Federico Villagra (Iveco)	4:12:41	(Russia) Eduard Nikolaev (Kamaz)	4:15:34	(Russia) Eduard Nikolaev (Kamaz)
8	(Russia) Dmitry Sotnikov (Kamaz)	4:23:32	(Argentina) Federico Villagra (Iveco)	4:28:43	(Russia) Ayrat Mardeev (Kamaz)	4:30:00	(Russia) Eduard Nikolaev (Kamaz)
9	Cancelled due to poor weather conditions						(Russia) Eduard Nikolaev (Kamaz)
10	(Netherlands) Ton van Genugten (Iveco)	5:31:49	(Belarus) Siarhei Viazovich (Maz)	5:42:58	(Argentina) Federico Villagra (Iveco)	5:47:22	(Russia) Eduard Nikolaev (Kamaz)
11	(Belarus) Siarhei Viazovich (Maz)	5:14:10	(Argentina) Federico Villagra (Iveco)	5:15:34	(Russia) Dmitry Sotnikov (Kamaz)	5:43:01	(Argentina) Federico Villagra (Iveco)
12	(Netherlands) Ton van Genugten (Iveco)	7:02:36	(Czech Republic) Martin Kolomý (Tatra)	7:06:47	(Russia) Eduard Nikolaev (Kamaz)	7:08:57	(Russia) Eduard Nikolaev (Kamaz)
13	(Russia) Eduard Nikolaev (Kamaz)	5:59:02	(Russia) Ayrat Mardeev (Kamaz)	5:59:52	(Czech Republic) Martin Kolomý (Tatra)	6:05:08	(Russia) Eduard Nikolaev (Kamaz)
14	(Netherlands) Ton van Genugten (Iveco)	1:39:47	(Czech Republic) Martin Macik (Liaz)	1:39:58	(Russia) Dmitry Sotnikov (Kamaz)	1:43:22	(Russia) Eduard Nikolaev (Kamaz)

=== UTVs ===
Stage	Stage winner	Time	Stage runner-up	Time	Stage third place	Time	Class leader
1	(Peru) Aníbal Aliaga (Polaris)	0:31:27	(Spain) Jose Luis Peña (Polaris)	0:34:28	(France) Claude Fournier (Polaris)	0:34:50	(Peru) Anibal Aliaga (Polaris)
2	(Brazil) Reinaldo Varela (Can-Am)	4:18:44	(Peru) Juan Carlos Uribe (Can-Am)	4:27:43	(France) Patrice Garrouste (Polaris)	4:40:41	(Peru) Juan Carlos Uribe (Can-Am)
3	(Peru) Juan Carlos Uribe (Can-Am)	4:30:36	(France) Patrice Garrouste (Polaris)	4:47:49	(France) Claude Fournier (Polaris)	5:12:48	(Peru) Juan Carlos Uribe (Can-Am)
4	(France) Patrice Garrouste (Polaris)	5:43:45	(Brazil) Reinaldo Varela (Can-Am)	6:09:18	(Argentina) Leo Larrauri (Can-Am)	6:58:23	(France) Patrice Garrouste (Polaris)
5	(Brazil) Reinaldo Varela (Can-Am)	3:42:42	(Peru) Juan Carlos Uribe (Can-Am)	3:58:19	(Spain) Jose Luis Peña (Polaris)	4:20:37	(Brazil) Reinaldo Varela (Can-Am)
6	(France) Patrice Garrouste (Polaris)	3:44:18	(Brazil) Reinaldo Varela (Can-Am)	3:58:47	(Peru) Juan Carlos Uribe (Can-Am)	4:15:46	(Brazil) Reinaldo Varela (Can-Am)
Rest day
7	(Brazil) Reinaldo Varela (Can-Am)	6:49:31	(France) Patrice Garrouste (Polaris)	7:21:03	(Peru) Juan Carlos Uribe (Can-Am)	7:45:00	(Brazil) Reinaldo Varela (Can-Am)
8	(Brazil) Reinaldo Varela (Can-Am)	7:30:18	(Peru) Juan Carlos Uribe (Can-Am)	7:49:13	(Argentina) Leo Larrauri (Can-Am)	8:18:27	(Brazil) Reinaldo Varela (Can-Am)
9	Cancelled due to poor weather conditions						(Brazil) Reinaldo Varela (Can-Am)
10	(France) Patrice Garrouste (Polaris)	6:37:07	(Peru) Juan Carlos Uribe (Can-Am)	7:46:37	(Spain) Jose Luis Peña (Polaris)	8:09:07	(Brazil) Reinaldo Varela (Can-Am)
11	(France) Patrice Garrouste (Polaris)	6:02:44	(Brazil) Reinaldo Varela (Can-Am)	6:06:23	(Argentina) Leo Larrauri (Can-Am)	6:13:54	(Brazil) Reinaldo Varela (Can-Am)
12	(Brazil) Reinaldo Varela (Can-Am)	9:27:12	(France) Claude Fournier (Polaris)	9:38:54	(Spain) Jose Luis Peña (Polaris)	9:45:27	(Brazil) Reinaldo Varela (Can-Am)
13	(France) Patrice Garrouste (Polaris)	6:29:40	(Brazil) Reinaldo Varela (Can-Am)	6:39:39	(France) Claude Fournier (Polaris)	7:33:17	(Brazil) Reinaldo Varela (Can-Am)
14	(Argentina) Leo Larrauri (Can-Am)	1:45:55	(Brazil) Reinaldo Varela (Can-Am)	1:53:59	(France) Patrice Garrouste (Polaris)	1:58:08	(Brazil) Reinaldo Varela (Can-Am)

== Final standings ==
=== Cars ===
Pos	No.	Rider	Brand	Team	Time
1	303	(Spain) Carlos Sainz	Peugeot	Team Peugeot Total	49:16:18
2	301	(Qatar) Nasser Al-Attiyah	Toyota	Toyota Gazoo Racing SA	+0:43:40
3	304	(South Africa) Giniel de Villiers	Toyota	Toyota Gazoo Racing SA	+1:16:41
4	300	(France) Stéphane Peterhansel	Peugeot	Team Peugeot Total	+1:25:29
5	312	(Poland) Jakub Przygoński	Mini	Orlen Team/X-Raid	+2:45:24
6	319	(United Arab Emirates) Khalid Al Qassimi	Peugeot	PH-Sport	+4:20:58
7	311	(Czech Republic) Martin Prokop	Ford	MP-Sports	+7:20:49
8	334	(Netherlands) Peter van Merksteijn	Toyota	Overdrive Toyota	+7:41:28
9	331	(Argentina) Sebastián Halpern	Toyota	South Racing	+9:08:10
10	318	(Argentina) Lucio Álvarez	Toyota	Overdrive Toyota	+9:18:46

=== Bikes ===
Pos	No.	Rider	Brand	Team	Time
1	2	(Austria) Matthias Walkner	KTM	Red Bull KTM Factory Team	43:06:01
2	47	(Argentina) Kevin Benavides	Honda	Monster Energy Honda Team	+0:16:53
3	8	(Australia) Toby Price	KTM	Red Bull KTM Factory Team	+0:23:01
4	19	(France) Antoine Méo	KTM	Red Bull KTM Factory Team	+0:47:28
5	3	(Spain) Gerard Farrés	KTM	Himoinsa Racing Team	+1:01:04
6	40	(France) Johnny Aubert	Gas Gas	Gas Gas Motorsport	+1:53:53
7	61	(Spain) Oriol Mena	Hero	Hero Motosports Team Rally	+2:22:52
8	10	(Chile) Pablo Quintanilla	Husqvarna	Rockstar Energy Husqvarna Factory Racing	+2:24:05
9	29	(Spain) Daniel Oliveras	KTM	Himoinsa Racing Team	+2:37:20
10	68	(Chile) José Ignacio Cornejo	Honda	Monster Energy Honda Team	+2:42:36

=== Quads ===
Pos	No.	Rider	Brand	Team	Time
1	241	(Chile) Ignacio Casale	Yamaha	Casale Racing	53:47:04
2	249	(Argentina) Nicolás Cavigliasso	Yamaha	Team Al Desert	+1:38:52
3	246	(Argentina) Jeremías González	Yamaha	Consultores de Empresas	+2:08:14
4	282	(Brazil) Marcelo Medeiros	Yamaha	Taguatur Racing Team	+4:30:00
5	248	(Peru) Alexis Hernández	Yamaha	Alexis Hernández Racing	+4:38:53
6	266	(Kazakhstan) Dmitriy Shilov	Yamaha	Astana Motorsports 2017	+6:44:57
7	251	(Paraguay) Nelson Sanabria	Yamaha	Sanabria Dakar Team	+8:02:56
8	254	(Netherlands) Kees Koolen	Barren Racer	Maxxis Super B Dakarteam	+8:24:58
9	245	(France) Axel Dutrie	Yamaha	Drag'On Rally Team	+8:30:22
10	280	(Argentina) Giuliano Giordana	Yamaha	Giordana Dakar Team	+9:18:25

=== Trucks ===
Pos	No.	Rider	Brand	Team	Time
1	500	(Russia) Eduard Nikolaev (Russia) Evgeny Yakovlev (Russia) Vladimir Rybakov	Kamaz	Kamaz-Master	54:57:37
2	512	(Belarus) Siarhei Viazovich (Belarus) Pavel Haranin (Belarus) Andrei Zhyhulin	MAZ	MAZ-Sportauto	+3:57:17
3	507	(Russia) Airat Mardeev (Russia) Aydar Belyaev (Russia) Dmitriy Svistunov	Kamaz	Kamaz-Master	+5:22:34
4	508	(Kazakhstan) Artur Ardavichus (Belgium) Serge Bruynkens (Netherlands) Michel Huisman	Iveco	Astana Motorsport Team de Rooy Iveco	+6:38:22
5	510	(Czech Republic) Martin Macík jr (Czech Republic) František Tomášek (Czech Republic) Michal Mrkva	Liaz	Big Shock Racing	+7:58:45
6	511	(Japan) Teruhito Sugawara (Japan) Mitsugu Takahashi	Hino	Hino Team Sugawara	+8:10:16
7	517	(Netherlands) Gert Huzink (Netherlands) Rob Buursen (Netherlands) Martin Roesink	Renault	Riwald Dakar Team	+9:19:23
8	509	(Netherlands) Ton van Genugten (Netherlands) Bernard der Kinderen (Belgium) Peter Willemsen	Iveco	Petronas Team de Rooy Iveco	+9:24:54
9	516	(Netherlands) Maurik van den Heuvel (Netherlands) Wilko van Oort (Netherlands) Martin van Rooij	Scania	Dakarspeed	+9:55:05
10	502	(Russia) Dmitry Sotnikov (Russia) Ruslan Akhmadeev (Russia) Ilnur Mustafin	Kamaz	Kamaz-Master	+10:03:47

=== UTVs ===
Pos	No.	Rider	Brand	Team	Time
1	356	(Brazil) Reinaldo Varela	Can-Am	South Racing – Can-Am	72:44:06
2	361	(France) Patrice Garrouste	Polaris	Xtremeplus Polaris Factory Team	+0:57:37
3	387	(France) Claude Fournier	Polaris	Xtremeplus Polaris Factory Team	+10:09:25
4	396	(Spain) Jose Luis Peña	Polaris	Xtremeplus Polaris Factory Team	+10:13:20
5	351	(Italy) Camélia Liparoti	Yamaha	C.A.T Racing	+27:54:15
6	362	(Argentina) Leo Larrauri	Can-Am	South Racing – Can-Am	+132:20:12

== Entry lists ==
=== Bikes ===
Entry list — Bikes

Brand	No.	Driver	
KTM	1	Sam Sunderland	United Kingdom
KTM	2	Matthias Walkner	Austria
KTM	3	Gerard Farrés Guell	Spain
Yamaha	4	Adrien van Beveren	France
Honda	5	Joan Barreda	Spain
Yamaha	7	Franco Caimi	Argentina
KTM	8	Toby Price	Australia
KTM	9	Štefan Svitko	Slovakia
Husqvarna	10	Pablo Quintanilla	Chile
KTM	11	Juan Carlos Salvatierra	Bolivia
Sherco	12	Juan Pedrero García	Spain
Honda	14	Michael Metge	France
KTM	15	Laia Sanz	Spain
KTM	16	Olivier Pain	France
KTM	17	Armand Monleón	Spain
Yamaha	18	Alessandro Botturi	Italy
KTM	19	Antoine Meo	France
Honda	20	Ricky Brabec	United States
Husqvarna	22	Ondřej Klymčiw	Czech Republic
Yamaha	23	Xavier De Soultrait	France
Sherco	24	Adrien Metge	France
KTM	25	Iván Cervantes	Spain
Hero Speed brain	26	Joaquim Rodrigues	Portugal
Honda	27	Diego Duplessis	Argentina
KTM	28	Emanuel Gyenes	Romania
KTM	29	Daniel Oliveras Carreras	Spain
Gas Gas	31	Cristian España Muñoz	Andorra
Husqvarna	32	Txomin Arana	Spain
Husqvarna	33	Daniel Nosiglia Jager	Bolivia
KTM	34	Marc Sola Terradellas	Spain
KTM	35	Loic Minaudier	France
Kawasaki	36	Patricio Cabrera	Chile
KTM	37	Milan Engel	Czech Republic
KTM	38	Fabricio Fuentes	Bolivia
KTM	39	Benjamin Melot	France
Gas Gas	40	Johnny Aubert	France
KTM	41	Alessandro Ruoso	Italy
Husqvarna	42	Maurizio Gerini	Italy
KTM	43	David Pabíška	Czech Republic
Yamaha	44	Rodney Faggotter	Australia
Husqvarna	45	David Thomas	South Africa
Yamaha	46	Mauricio Javier Gomez	Argentina
Honda	47	Kevin Benavides	Argentina
KTM	48	Jurgen van den Goorbergh	Netherlands
Hero Speed brain	49	CS Santosh	India
Husqvarna	50	Mirjam Pol	Netherlands
KTM	51	Hans-Jos Liefhebber	Netherlands
Husqvarna	52	Jacopo Cerruti	Italy
Sherco	53	Aravind Prabhakar	India
Husqvarna	54	Andrew Short	United States
Husqvarna	55	Walter Nosiglia Jager	Bolivia
KTM	56	Fausto Mota	Spain
KTM	57	Philippe Cavelius	France
KTM	58	Maciej Giemza	Poland
KTM	59	Willem Du Toit	South Africa
Gas Gas	60	Jonathan Barragán	Spain
Hero Speed Brain	61	Oriol Mena	Spain
KTM	62	Pablo Oscar Pascual	Argentina
KTM	63	Adrien Mare	France
Honda	64	Marl Samuels	United States
Yamaha	65	Guillaume Chollet	France
KTM	66	Charles Cuypers	France
Husqvarna	67	Markus Berthold	Austria
KTM	68	José Ignacio Cornejo Florimo	Peru
KTM	69	János Dési	Hungary
Kawasaki	70	Cristóbal Andres Guldman González	Chile
Honda	71	Alberto Santiago Ontiveros	Argentina
KTM	72	Arnold Brucy	France
KTM	73	Rosa Romero Font	Spain
KTM	74	Carlo Vellutino	Peru
KTM	75	Rudolf Lhotsky	Czech Republic
KTM	76	Mohammed Balooshi	United Arab Emirates
KTM	77	Luciano Benavides	Argentina
KTM	78	Pawel Stasiaczek	Poland
Husqvarna	79	Max Hunt	United Kingdom
KTM	80	Laurent Lazard	Uruguay
Yamaha	81	Shinnosuke Kazama	Japan
Husqvarna	82	Petr Vlček	Czech Republic
KTM	83	Jesús Puras	Spain
KTM	84	Patrice Carillon	France
Yamaha	85	Nicolas Billaud	France
Yamaha	86	Julian Jose Garcia Merino	Spain
KTM	87	Stephane Gourlia	France
KTM	88	Jan Veselý	Czech Republic
KTM	89	Gabor Saghmeiseter	Serbia
Husqvarna	90	Gabriela Novotná	Czech Republic
Husqvarna	91	Jan Brabec	Czech Republic
KTM	92	Jakub Piątek	Poland
KTM	93	Maciej Berdysz	Poland
KTM	94	José Israel Borrell Gonzalez	Spain
KTM	95	Juan Rojo	Argentina
KTM	96	Nicolas Brabeck-Letmathe	Austria
KTM	97	Scott Britnell	Australia
KTM	98	Balys Bardauskas	Lithuania
KTM	99	Wessel Bosman	Lesotho
KTM	100	Lyndon Poskitt	United Kingdom
Honda	101	Francisco Jose Gomez Pallas	Spain
KTM	102	Ignacio Sanchis	Spain
KTM	103	Shane Esposito	United States
KTM	104	Jürgen Drössiger	Germany
Husqvarna	105	Bill Conger	United States
KTM	106	Simon Marcic	Slovenia
KTM	107	Ferran Jubany	Spain
Husqvarna	108	Fausto Vignola	Italy
KTM	109	Danny Robert Nogales Copa	Bolivia
KTM	110	Alberto Bertoldi	Italy
KTM	111	Santiago Bernal	Colombia
KTM	112	Stephane Bouvier	France
KTM	113	Sebastian Alberto Urquia	Argentina
KTM	114	Leandro Bertona Altieri	Argentina
Husqvarna	115	Jack Lundin	Canada
KTM	116	Zao Hongyi	China
KTM	117	Zhang Ming	China
KTM	118	Luc van de Huijgevoort	Netherlands
KTM	119	Oswaldo Burga	Peru
Yamaha	120	Jeroen Ramon	Belgium
KTM	121	Edwin Straver	Netherlands
KTM	123	Sebastian Cavallero	Peru
Honda	124	Jeri Corno	Peru
KTM	125	Donovan van de Langenberg	South Africa
KTM	127	Fernando Hernandez	Argentina
KTM	128	Maikel Smits	Netherlands
KTM	129	Gerry van der Byl	South Africa
KTM	130	Jairo Segarra Almagro	Spain
Husqvarna	131	Jhon Trejos	Colombia
Suzuki	132	Roberto Vecco	Peru
Yamaha	133	Elric Lambert	France
KTM	134	Gabriele Minelli	Italy
Alfer	135	Oscar Romero Montoya	Spain
Yamaha	137	Olivier Hembert	France
KTM	138	Romain Leloup	France
KTM	139	Lajos Horvath	Hungary
KTM	141	Livio Metelli	Italy
Yamaha	142	Takayuki Momma	Japan
KTM	143	Álvaro Cóppola	Uruguay
KTM	144	Arturo Chirinos	Peru
KTM	146	Bruno Raymond	France
KTM	155	Guillaume Martens	Netherlands
KTM	167	Bruno Scheurer	France

=== Quads ===
Entry list — Quads

Brand	No.	Driver	
Yamaha	240	Sergey Karyakin	Russia
Yamaha	241	Ignacio Casale	Chile
Yamaha	242	Pablo Copetti	Argentina
Yamaha	243	Rafał Sonik	Poland
Yamaha	245	Axel Dutrie	France
Yamaha	246	Jeremías González Ferioli	Argentina
Yamaha	247	Josef Macháček	Czech Republic
Yamaha	248	Alexis Hernández	Peru
Yamaha	249	Nicolás Cavigilasso	Argentina
Yamaha	251	Nelson Augusto Sanabria Galeano	Paraguay
Barren Racer	254	Kees Koolen	Netherlands
Yamaha	255	Gustavo Gallego	Argentina
Honda	256	Walter Nosiglia	Bolivia
Can-Am	257	Kamil Wiśniewski	Poland
Honda	258	Daniel Domaszewski	Argentina
Yamaha	259	Sébastien Souday	France
Yamaha	260	Alexandre Giroud	France
Yamaha	261	Zdeněk Tuma	Czech Republic
Yamaha	262	Bruno da Costa	France
Yamaha	263	Carlos Alejandro Verza	Argentina
IBOS	264	Tomáš Kubiena	Czech Republic
Yamaha	265	Maxim Antimirov	Kazakhstan
Yamaha	266	Dmitriy Shilov	Kazakhstan
Can-Am	268	Jan Bastiaan Nijen Twilhaar	Netherlands
Yamaha	269	Simon Vitse	France
Yamaha	270	Frédéric Alard	France
Can-Am	271	Daniel Mazzucco	Argentina
Yamaha	272	Juan Carlos Carignani	Germany
Yamaha	273	Manuel Andújar	Argentina
Can-Am	274	Pablo Luis Bustamante	Argentina
Yamaha	275	Mariano Bennazar	Argentina
Can-Am	276	Alejandro Fantoni	Argentina
Yamaha	277	Olga Roučková	Czech Republic
Yamaha	278	Giovanni Enrico	Chile
Can-Am	279	Christian Massey	Costa Rica
Yamaha	280	Giuliano Horacio Giordana	Argentina
Yamaha	282	Marcelo Medeiros	Brazil
Can-Am	283	Rómulo Airaldi	Peru
Yamaha	284	Gastón González	Argentina
Yamaha	285	Carlos Joffre	Argentina
Yamaha	286	Christian Jose Málaga Carpio	Peru
Can-Am	287	Cristian Cajicá Pinto	Colombia
Can-Am	288	Marcos López	Argentina
Can-Am	289	Leonardo Martínez	Bolivia
Can-Am	290	Suany Martínez	Bolivia
Can-Am	291	Pablo Luis Novara	Argentina
Honda	292	Hernán Paredes	Bolivia
Can-Am	293	Nicolás Robledo Serna	Colombia
Can-Am	294	Martin Sarquiz	Argentina

=== Cars ===
Entry list — Cars

Brand	No.	Driver		Co-driver	
Peugeot	300	Stéphane Peterhansel	France	Jean Paul Cottret	France
Toyota	301	Nasser Al-Attiyah	Qatar	Matthieu Baumel	France
Mini All4 Racing	302	Nani Roma	Spain	Alex Haro Bravo	Spain
Peugeot	303	Carlos Sainz	Spain	Lucas Cruz	Spain
Toyota	304	Giniel de Villiers	South Africa	Dirk von Zitzewitz	Germany
Mini All4 Racing	305	Mikko Hirvonen	Finland	Andreas Schulz	Germany
Peugeot	306	Sébastien Loeb	France	Daniel Elena	Monaco
Mini All4 Racing	307	Orlando Terranova	Argentina	Bernardo Graue	Argentina
Peugeot	308	Cyril Despres	France	David Castera	France
Toyota	309	Bernhard ten Brinke	Netherlands	Michel Perin	France
Mini All4 Racing	310	Bryce Menzies	United States	Peter Mortensen	United States
Ford	311	Martin Prokop	Czech Republic	Jan Tománek	Czech Republic
Mini All4 Racing	312	Jakub Przygoński	Poland	Tom Colsoul	Belgium
Borgward	313	Nicolás Fuchs	Peru	Fernando Adrian Mussano	Argentina
Mini All4 Racing	314	Yazeed Al-Rajhi	Saudi Arabia	Timo Gottschalk	Germany
Renault	315	Carlos Sousa	Portugal	Pascal Maimon	France
Toyota	316	Ronan Chabot	France	Gilles Pillot	France
Mini All4 Racing	317	Boris Garafulic	Chile	Filipe Palmeiro	Portugal
Toyota	318	Lucio Álvarez	Argentina	Robert Howie	South Africa
Peugeot	319	Khalid Al Qassimi	United Arab Emirates	Xavier Panseri	France
Buggy	320	Éric Bernard	France	Alexandre Vigneau	France
Toyota	321	Antanas Juknevičius	Lithuania	Darius Vaičiulis	Lithuania
Renault	322	Emiliano Spataro	Argentina	Santiago Hansen	Argentina
Toyota	323	Benediktas Vanagas	Lithuania	Sebastian Rozwadowski	Poland
Toyota	324	Yong Zhou	China	Stephane Prevot	Belgium
Toyota	326	Alejandro Miguel Yacopini	Argentina	Marco Scopinaro	Argentina
Ford	327	Marco Bulacia	Bolivia	Eugenio Arrieta	Argentina
Toyota	328	Christian Lavieille	France	Jean-Pierre Garcin	France
Buggy	329	Patrick Sireyjol	France	François Xavier Beguin	Belgium
Toyota	330	Jérôme Pelichet	France	Eugénie Decré	Switzerland
Toyota	331	Sebastián Halpern	Argentina	Edu Pulenta	Argentina
Mercedes-Benz	332	Juan Silva	Argentina	Andres Young Olivari	Peru
Toyota	333	Maik Willems	Netherlands	Robert van Pelt	Netherlands
Toyota	334	Peter van Merksteijn	Netherlands	Maciej Marton	Poland
Ford	335	Eugenio Amos	Italy	Sébastien Delaunay	France
Springbok MD	336	Isidre Esteve Pujol	Spain	Txema Villalobos	Spain
Toyota	337	Akira Miura	Japan	Laurent Lichtleuchter	France
Toyota	338	Xavier Foj	Spain	Ignacio Santamaría	Argentina
Toyota	339	Sergei Shikhotarov	Russia	Andrei Samarin	Russia
Ford	340	Tomáš Ourednicek	Czech Republic	David Kripal	Czech Republic
Toyota	341	He Zhitao	China	Kai Zhao	China
Buggy	342	Philippe Boutron	France	Mayeul Barbet	France
Toyota	343	Jürgen Schröder	Germany	Maximilian Schröder	Germany
Rastrojero	344	Jose Antonio Blangino	Argentina	Fernando Matias Acosta	Argentina
Buggy	345	Roger Audas	France	Reynald Prive	France
Toyota	346	André Villas-Boas	Portugal	Ruben Faria	Portugal
Chevrolet	347	Tim Coronel	Netherlands	Tom Coronel	Netherlands
Volvo	348	Ebert Dollevoet	Netherlands	Arjan Arendse	Netherlands
Toyota	349	Vaidotas Žala	Lithuania	Saulius Jurgelenas	Lithuania
Mitsubishi	350	Jorge Wagenführ	Brazil	Idali Bosse Rodrigues da Silva Filho	Brazil
Mitsubishi	352	Francisco León	Peru	Tomás Hirahoka	Peru
Volkswagen	353	Hennie de Klerk	South Africa	Gerhard Schutte	South Africa
Mitsubishi	354	Cristina Gutiérrez Herrero	Spain	Gabriel Moiset Ferrer	Spain
SsangYong	355	Oscar Fuertes Aldanondo	Spain	Diego Vallejo	Spain
Chevrolet	357	Sebastián Guayasamín	Ecuador	Mauro Esteban Lípez	Argentina
Volkswagen	358	Fernando Ferrand Malatesta	Peru	Fernando Ferrand del Busto	Peru
BMW	360	Yves Tartarin	France	Jérome Meunier	France
Toyota	363	Mauricio Salazar Velásquez	Colombia	Mauricio Salazar Sierra	Colombia
Toyota	364	Miguel Angel Álvarez Pineda	Peru	Ricardo Mendiola	Peru
Borgward	365	Erik Wevers	Netherlands	Anton van Limpt	Netherlands
Mercedes-Benz	366	Martin Maldonado	Argentina	Sebastian Scholz Vergnolle	Argentina
Opel	367	Balázs Szalay	Hungary	László Bunkoczi	Hungary
Toyota	368	Rainer Wissmanns	Germany	Cyril Jeanniard	France
Toyota	369	Eelco Bekker	Netherlands	Sijbrand Booij	Netherlands
Toyota	371	Omar Eliseo Gandará	Argentina	Leonardo Martínez	Argentina
Ford	372	Boris Vaculík	Czech Republic	Martin Plechatý	Czech Republic
Toyota	373	Alicia Reina	Argentina	Carlos Dante Pelayo	Argentina
Toyota	377	Pierre Tuheil	France	Frédéric Tuheil	France
Springbok MD	379	Gerard Tramoni	France	Dominque Totain	France
Buggy	380	Francis Balocchi	France	Franck Maldonado	France
Toyota	381	Roberto Naivirt	Argentina	Alejandro Julio Schilling	Argentina
Toyota	382	Igor Shikhotarov	Russia	Oleg Uperenko	Latvia
Toyota	383	Juan Carlos Vallejo	Chile	Leonardo Baronio	Peru
Nissan	384	Ignacio Villegas	France	Jeff Sunderland	United States
QT Services	386	Markus Walcher	Germany	Tobias Henschel	Germany
Desert Warrior	389	Henri Vansteenbergen	Netherlands	Gert Bravenboer	Netherlands
Toyota	390	Stefano Marrini	Italy	Maurizio Nassi	Italy
Jeep	391	Jesus Calleja	Spain	Jaume Aregall	Spain
Toyota	392	Fernanda Kanno	Peru	Alberto Silva	Peru
Volkswagen	393	Jorge Mansilla	Argentina	Sebastian Cesana	Argentina
Nissan	394	Carlos Alberto Villegas Aguero	Argentina	Maria del Huerto Mattar Smith	Argentina
Buggy	395	Jad Comair	Lebanon	Antonie Iskandar	Lebanon
Isuzu	397	Roberto Recalde	Paraguay	Juan Jose Sanchez	Paraguay
Nissan	398	Diego Weber	Peru	Juan Jose Ponce Aylwin	Ecuador
Toyota	399	Luciano Pérez Gacha	Bolivia	Álvaro Jesus Valdivia Scott	Bolivia
Toyota	400	Philippe Raud	France	Patrice Saint Marc	France
Toyota	401	Ricardo Neme Neme	Argentina	Ramiro Corvalan	Argentina
Toyota	404	Ramon Nunez	Argentina	Sergio David Casas	Argentina
Toyota	405	Rilver Vasquez	Bolivia	Juan Pablo Vargas	Bolivia
Toyota	406	Nicolas Falloux	France	Florian Gonzalez	France
Toyota	407	Marco Piana	France	David Giovannetti	Italy
Toyota	410	Emmanuel Baltes-Mougeot	France	Thierry Richard	France

=== Trucks ===
Entry list — Trucks

Brand	No.	Driver		Co-driver		Mechanic	
Kamaz	500	Eduard Nikolaev	Russia	Evgeny Yakovlev	Russia	Vladimir Rybakov	Russia
Iveco	501	Federico Villagra	Argentina	Adrián Arturo Yacopini	Argentina	Ricardo Adrian Torlaschi	Argentina
Kamaz	502	Dmitry Sotnikov	Russia	Ruslan Akhmadeev	Russia	Ilnur Mustafin	Russia
MAZ	503	Aleksandr Vasilevski	Belarus	Dzmitry Vikhrenka	Belarus	Anton Zaparoshchanka	Belarus
TATRA	504	Aleš Loprais	Czech Republic	Lukáš Janda	Czech Republic	Ferran Marco Alcayna	Spain
TATRA	505	Martin Kolomý	Czech Republic	Jiří Stross	Czech Republic	Rostislav Plný	Czech Republic
Renault Trucks	506	Martín van den Brink	Netherlands	Wouter Rosegaar	Netherlands	Daniel Kozlowsky	Czech Republic
Kamaz	507	Ayrat Mardeev	Russia	Dmitriy Svistunov	Russia	Aydar Belyaev	Russia
Iveco	508	Artur Ardavichus	Kazakhstan	Serge Bruynkens	Belgium	Michel Huisman	Netherlands
Iveco	509	Ton van Genugten	Netherlands	Bernard Der Kinderen	Netherlands	Peter Willemsen	Belgium
LIAZ	510	Martin Macík	Czech Republic	František Tomášek	Czech Republic	Michal Mrkva	Czech Republic
HINO	511	Teruhito Sugawara	Japan	Mitsugu Takahashi	Japan		
MAZ	512	Siarhei Viazovich	Belarus	Pavel Haranin	Belarus	Andrei Zhyhulin	Belarus
MAN SE	514	Steven Rotsaert	Belgium	Charly Gotlib	Belgium	Jan van der Vaet	Belgium
Kamaz	515	Anton Shibalov	Russia	Dmitrii Nikitin	Russia	Ivan Romanov	Russia
Scania AB	516	Maurik van den Heuvel	Netherlands	Wilko Van Oort	Netherlands	Martijn van Rooij	Netherlands
Renault Trucks	517	Gert Huznik	Netherlands	Rob Buursen	Netherlands	Martin Roesink	Netherlands
MAZ	518	Aliaksei Vishneuski	Belarus	Maksim Novikau	Belarus	Andrei Neviarovich	Belarus
MAN SE	519	Jordi Juvanteny	Spain	Jose Luis Criado	Spain	Francisco Javier Tamayo Calvo	Spain
DAF	520	Michel Boucou	France	Jean-Jacques Martínez	France	Jose Martins	Portugal
HINO	521	Yoshimasa Sugawara	Japan	Katsumi Hamura	Japan		
Mercedes-Benz	522	Rafael Tibau Roura	Spain	Pep Sabaté	Spain	Philipp Beier	Germany
MAN SE	523	Dave Ingels	Belgium	Michał Wrzos	Poland	Kurt Keysers	Belgium
MAN SE	524	Gerrit Zuurmond	Netherlands	Jasper Riezebos	Netherlands	Klaas Kwakkel	Netherlands
DAF	525	Richard de Groot	Netherlands	Gerardus Beelen	Netherlands	Jan Hulsebosch	Netherlands
GINAF	526	Ed Wigman	Netherlands	Hendrik Elisabert Schatorie	Netherlands	Joel Ebbers	Netherlands
DAF	527	Marc Leeuw	Netherlands	Maurice Geraards	Netherlands	Lambertus Gloudemans	Netherlands
DAF	528	Aviv Kadshai	Israel	Izhar Armony	United States	Maoz Vilder	Israel
DAF	529	Richard Gonzalez	France	Jean-Pierre Normand Courivaud	France	Jean-Philippe Salviat	France
MAN SE	530	Matthias Behringer	Germany	Stefan Henken	Germany	Marco Moreiras	Portugal
Renault Trucks	531	Janus Van Kasteren	Netherlands	Wouter de Graaff	Netherlands	Rijk Mouw	Netherlands
TATRA	532	Martin Šoltys	Czech Republic	Josef Kalina	Czech Republic	Tomáš Šikola	Czech Republic
Unimog	533	Antonio Cabini	Italy	Raffaella Cabini	Italy	Giulio Verzeletti	Italy
Unimog	534	Paolo Calabria	Italy	Giuseppe Fortuna	Italy		
Mercedes-Benz	535	Nicola Montecchio	Italy	Loris Calubini	Italy	Carlo Cabini	Italy
MAN SE	536	Michel Saumet	France	Xavier Tancogne	France	Laurent Claude Wermeister	France
Mercedes-Benz	537	Sylvain Besnard	France	Sylvain Laliche	France	Dave Berghmans	Belgium
MAN SE	539	Ramzi Osmani	Oman	Samir Benbekhti	Oman	Ahmed Benbekhti	Oman
MAN SE	540	Robert Randýsek	Czech Republic	Petr Pokora	Czech Republic	David Schovánek	Czech Republic
TATRA	541	Pavel Vrňák	Czech Republic	Petr Lesák	Czech Republic	Filip Škrobánek	Czech Republic
MAN SE	542	John Cockburn	United Kingdom	Pierre Calmon	France	Fabien Catherine	France
MAN SE	543	Serge Lacourt	France	Pascal Bonnaire	France	Thierry Pacquelet	France
MAN SE	544	Jordi Ginesta	Andorra	Christophe Allot	France	Marc Dardaillon	France
Mercedes-Benz	545	Alberto Herrero	Spain	Jordi Celma Obiols	Spain	Paulo Fiuza	Portugal

=== UTVs ===
Entry list — UTVs

Brand	No.	Driver		Co-driver	
Yamaha	351	Camelia Liparoti	Italy	Angelo Montico	Italy
Can-Am	356	Reinaldo Varela	Brazil	Gustavo Gugelmin	Brazil
Can-Am	359	Juan Carlos Uribe Ramos	Peru	Javier Eduardo Uribe Godoy	Peru
Polaris	361	Patrice Garrouste	France	Steven Griener	Switzerland
Can-Am	362	Leo Larrauri	Argentina	Fernando Imperatrice	Argentina
Yamaha	370	Pedro de Mello Breyner	Portugal	Pedro Velosa	Portugal
Yamaha	375	José Nicolás González	Spain	Ariel Jatón	Argentina
Polaris	378	José Jorge de Barros Sawaya	Brazil	Marcelo Duarte Haseyama	Brazil
Polaris	387	Claude Fournier	France	Szymon Gospodarczyk	Poland
Polaris	388	Anibal Aliaga	Peru	Juan Pedro Cilloniz Duclos	Peru
Polaris	396	José Luis Peña Campo	Spain	Rafael Tornabell Cordoba	Spain
