= 2019 Dakar Rally =

Off-road motorsport event in Peru

Part of the Dakar Rally
← Previous event	Next event →
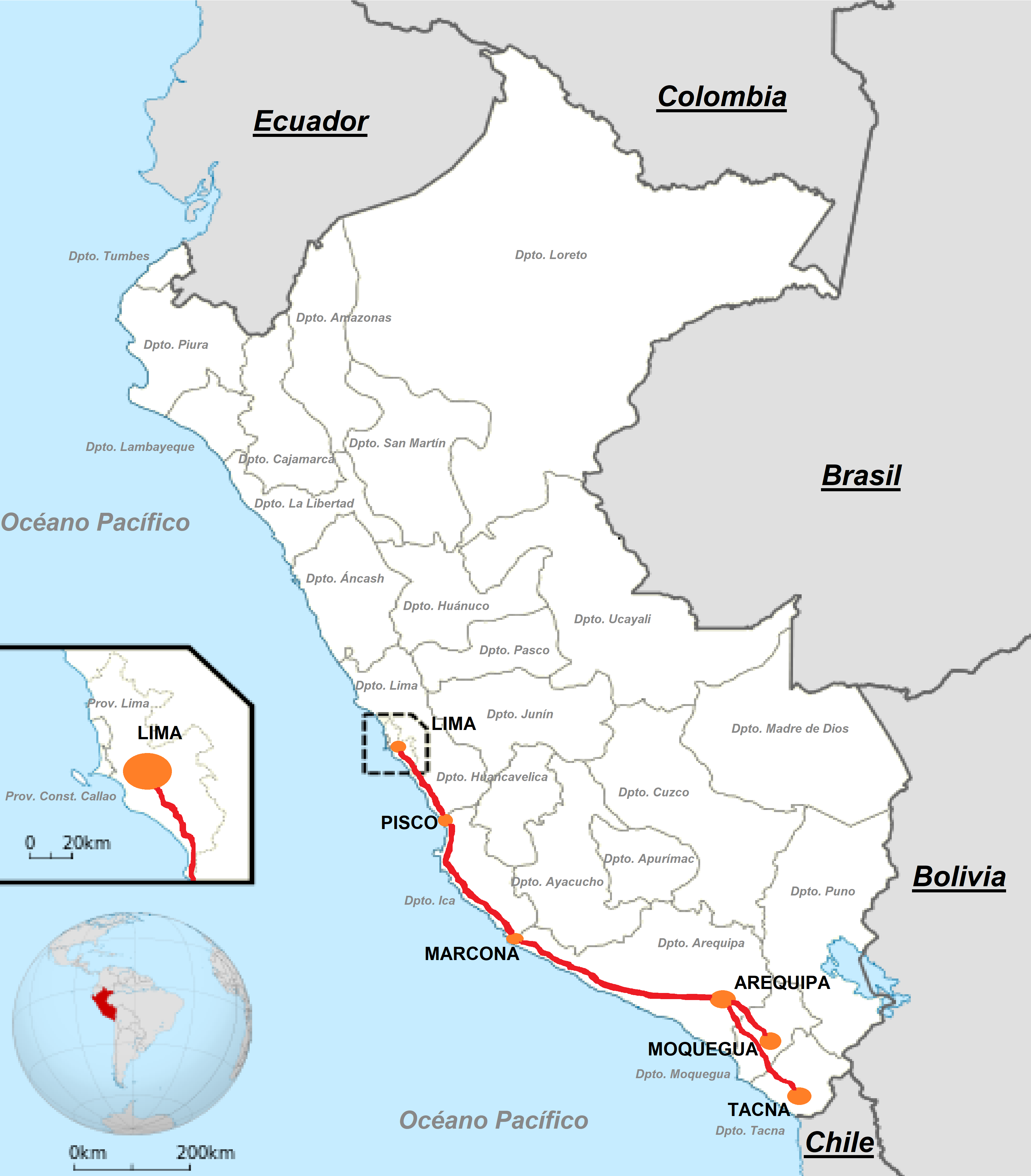
- Host country: Peru
- Dates run: 6–17 January 2019
- Start: (Peru) Lima
- Finish: (Peru) Lima
- Stages: 10
- Stage surface: Gravel, dirt, sand

Results
- Cars winner: (Qatar) Nasser Al-Attiyah (France) Matthieu Baumel; Toyota Gazoo Racing SA
- Bikes winner: (Australia) Toby Price; Red Bull KTM Factory Racing
- Quads winner: (Argentina) Nicolás Cavigliasso; Drag'on Rally
- Trucks winner: (Russia) Eduard Nikolaev (Russia) Evgenii Iakovlev (Russia) Vladimir Rybakov; Kamaz Master
- UTVs winner: (Chile) Francisco López Contardo (Chile) Álvaro León; South Racing Can-Am

The 2019 Dakar Rally was the 41st edition of the event and the eleventh successive year that the event was held in South America. The event started in Lima, Peru on 6 January and finished there on 17 January after 10 stages of competition, making it the first Dakar Rally to be held in a single country.

Qatari Nasser Al-Attiyah won his third Dakar in the Cars division for Toyota, in the process becoming the second person to win the Dakar Rally with three different vehicle manufacturers (other wins came with Volkswagen in 2011 and Mini in 2015). In the Bikes division, Toby Price of Australia won his second Dakar Rally despite suffering from a fractured wrist during the event. The Kamaz team of Eduard Nikolaev, Evgenii Iakovlev and Vladimir Rybakov won their third consecutive title in the Trucks division.

This would mark the final time the Dakar Rally was held in South America. From 2020 onwards, the rally was held in Saudi Arabia.

== Number of entries ==
Stage	Bikes	Quads	Cars	Trucks	UTVs	Total
Start of rally	137	26	100	41	30	334
Rest day	95	15	66	18	23	217
End of rally	75	15	56	14	20	180

== Stages ==
Distance according to the official website.

=== Bikes, quads and cars ===
Stage	Date	Depart	Arrive	Bikes			Quads	Cars		
Stage	Date	Depart	Arrive	Km	Km	Winner	Winner	Km	Km	Winner
1	7 Jan	(Peru) Lima	(Peru) Pisco	247	84	(Spain) Joan Barreda	(Argentina) Nicolas Cavigliasso	247	84	(Qatar) Nasser Al-Attiyah
2	8 Jan	(Peru) Pisco	(Peru) San Juan de Marcona	211	342	(Austria) Matthias Walkner	(Argentina) Nicolas Cavigliasso	211	342	(France) Sébastien Loeb
3	9 Jan	(Peru) San Juan de Marcona	(Peru) Arequipa	467	331	(France) Xavier de Soultrait	(Argentina) Jeremías González	467	331	(France) Stéphane Peterhansel
4	10 Jan	(Peru) Arequipa	(Peru) Moquegua	106	405	(United States) Ricky Brabec	(Argentina) Nicolas Cavigliasso	259	405	(Qatar) Nasser Al-Attiyah
5	11 Jan	(Peru) Moquegua	(Peru) Arequipa	431	345	(United Kingdom) Sam Sunderland	(Argentina) Nicolas Cavigliasso	431	345	(France) Sébastien Loeb
	12 Jan	(Peru) Arequipa – rest day								
6	13 Jan	(Peru) Arequipa	(Peru) San Juan de Marcona	502	336	(Chile) Pablo Quintanilla	(Argentina) Nicolas Cavigliasso	502	336	(France) Sébastien Loeb
7	14 Jan	(Peru) San Juan de Marcona	(Peru) San Juan de Marcona	64	323	(United Kingdom) Sam Sunderland	(Argentina) Nicolas Cavigliasso	64	323	(France) Stéphane Peterhansel
8	15 Jan	(Peru) San Juan de Marcona	(Peru) Pisco	215	360	(Austria) Matthias Walkner	(Argentina) Nicolas Cavigliasso	215	360	(France) Sébastien Loeb
9	16 Jan	(Peru) Pisco	(Peru) Pisco	96	313	(France) Michael Metge	(Argentina) Nicolas Cavigliasso	96	313	(Qatar) Nasser Al-Attiyah
10	17 Jan	(Peru) Pisco	(Peru) Lima	247	112	(Australia) Toby Price	(Argentina) Nicolas Cavigliasso	247	112	(Spain) Carlos Sainz

=== Trucks and UTVs ===
Stage	Date	Depart	Arrive	Trucks			UTVs		
Stage	Date	Depart	Arrive	Km	Km	Winner	Km	Km	Winner
1	7 Jan	(Peru) Lima	(Peru) Pisco	247	84	(Russia) Eduard Nikolaev	247	84	(Brazil) Reinaldo Varela
2	8 Jan	(Peru) Pisco	(Peru) San Juan de Marcona	211	342	(Russia) Eduard Nikolaev	211	342	(Chile) Francisco López
3	9 Jan	(Peru) San Juan de Marcona	(Peru) Arequipa	467	331	(Russia) Andrey Karginov	467	331	(Spain) Gerard Farres
4	10 Jan	(Peru) Arequipa	(Peru) Moquegua	259	405	(Russia) Andrey Karginov	259	405	(Russia) Sergey Karyakin
5	11 Jan	(Peru) Moquegua	(Peru) Arequipa	431	345	(Netherlands) Ton van Genugten	431	345	(Chile) Rodrigo Moreno Piazzoli
	12 Jan	(Peru) Arequipa – rest day							
6	13 Jan	(Peru) Arequipa	(Peru) San Juan de Marcona	502	336	(Netherlands) Gerard de Rooy	502	336	(Chile) Francisco López
7	14 Jan	(Peru) San Juan de Marcona	(Peru) San Juan de Marcona	64	323	(Netherlands) Gerard de Rooy	64	323	(Chile) Francisco López
8	15 Jan	(Peru) San Juan de Marcona	(Peru) Pisco	215	360	(Russia) Dmitry Sotnikov	215	360	(Chile) Francisco López
9	16 Jan	(Peru) Pisco	(Peru) Pisco	96	313	(Russia) Eduard Nikolaev	96	313	(Brazil) Reinaldo Varela
10	17 Jan	(Peru) Pisco	(Peru) Lima	247	112	(Netherlands) Ton van Genugten	247	112	(Brazil) Reinaldo Varela

== Stage results ==
=== Bikes ===
	Stage result					General classification				
Stage	Pos	Competitor	Make	Time	Gap	Pos	Competitor	Make	Time	Gap
1	1	(Spain) Joan Barreda	Honda	00:57:36		1	(Spain) Joan Barreda	Honda	00:57:36	
1	2	(Chile) Pablo Quintanilla	Husqvarna	00:59:10	00:01:34	2	(Chile) Pablo Quintanilla	Husqvarna	00:59:10	00:01:34
1	3	(United States) Ricky Brabec	Honda	01:00:28	00:02:52	3	(United States) Ricky Brabec	Honda	01:00:28	00:02:52
2	1	(Austria) Matthias Walkner	KTM	03:23:57		1	(Spain) Joan Barreda	Honda	04:23:14	
2	2	(United States) Ricky Brabec	Honda	03:24:19	00:00:22	2	(Austria) Matthias Walkner	KTM	04:24:25	00:01:31
2	3	(Spain) Joan Barreda	Honda	03:25:38	00:01:41	3	(United States) Ricky Brabec	Honda	04:24:47	00:01:33
3	1	(France) Xavier de Soultrait	Yamaha	04:07:42		1	(Chile) Pablo Quintanilla	Husqvarna	08:34:38	
3	2	(Chile) Pablo Quintanilla	Husqvarna	04:07:57	00:00:15	2	(Argentina) Kevin Benavides	Honda	08:45:51	00:11:23
3	3	(Argentina) Kevin Benavides	Honda	04:10:19	00:02:37	3	(United Kingdom) Sam Sunderland	KTM	08:46:40	00:12:12
4	1	(United States) Ricky Brabec	Honda	03:40:30		1	(United States) Ricky Brabec	Honda	12:33:00	
4	2	(Austria) Matthias Walkner	KTM	03:46:49	00:06:19	2	(Chile) Pablo Quintanilla	Husqvarna	12:35:19	00:02:19
4	3	(Australia) Toby Price	KTM	03:47:37	00:07:07	3	(Australia) Toby Price	KTM	12:37:22	00:04:22
5	1	(United Kingdom) Sam Sunderland	KTM	04:11:48		1	(United States) Ricky Brabec	Honda	16:51:34	
5	2	(France) Xavier de Soultrait	Yamaha	04:15:11	00:03:23	2	(United Kingdom) Sam Sunderland	KTM	16:52:33	00:00:59
5	3	(Spain) Lorenzo Santolino	Sherco	04:15:48	00:04:00	3	(Chile) Pablo Quintanilla	Husqvarna	16:54:26	00:02:52
Rest day
6	1	(Chile) Pablo Quintanilla	Husqvarna	03:50:47		1	(Chile) Pablo Quintanilla	Husqvarna	20:45:13	
6	2	(Argentina) Kevin Benavides	Honda	03:52:39	00:01:52	2	(United States) Ricky Brabec	Honda	20:49:51	00:04:38
6	3	(Austria) Matthias Walkner	KTM	03:55:08	00:04:21	3	(Australia) Toby Price	KTM	20:50:30	00:05:17
7	1	(United Kingdom) Sam Sunderland	KTM	03:51:41		1	(United States) Ricky Brabec	Honda	24:48:02	
7	2	(Chile) Ignacio Cornejo	Honda	03:53:32	00:01:51	2	(France) Adrien van Beveren	Yamaha	24:55:49	00:07:47
7	3	(United States) Ricky Brabec	Honda	03:58:11	00:06:30	3	(Australia) Toby Price	KTM	24:56:30	00:08:28
8	1	(Austria) Matthias Walkner	KTM	03:55:25		1	(Australia) Toby Price	KTM	28:53:08	
8	2	(Chile) Pablo Quintanilla	Husqvarna	03:56:10	00:00:45	2	(Chile) Pablo Quintanilla	Husqvarna	28:54:11	00:01:03
8	3	(Australia) Toby Price	KTM	03:56:38	00:01:13	3	(Austria) Matthias Walkner	KTM	28:59:43	00:06:35
9	1	(France) Michael Metge	Sherco	03:46:38		1	(Australia) Toby Price	KTM	32:43:15	
9	2	(Bolivia) Daniel Nosiglia	Honda	03:48:38	00:02:00	2	(Chile) Pablo Quintanilla	Husqvarna	32:44:17	00:01:02
9	3	(Chile) Pablo Quintanilla	Husqvarna	03:50:06	00:03:28	3	(Austria) Matthias Walkner	KTM	32:49:50	00:06:35
10	1	(Australia) Toby Price	KTM	01:14:01		1	(Australia) Toby Price	KTM	33:57:16	
10	2	(Chile) Ignacio Cornejo	Honda	01:16:22	00:02:21	2	(Austria) Matthias Walkner	KTM	34:06:29	00:09:13
10	3	(Austria) Matthias Walkner	KTM	01:16:39	00:02:28	3	(United Kingdom) Sam Sunderland	KTM	34:10:50	00:13:34

=== Quads ===
	Stage result					General classification				
Stage	Pos	Competitor	Make	Time	Gap	Pos	Competitor	Make	Time	Gap
1	1	(Argentina) Nicolás Cavigliasso	Yamaha	01:17:15		1	(Argentina) Nicolás Cavigliasso	Yamaha	01:17:15	
1	2	(Argentina) Jeremías González	Yamaha	01:21:10	00:03:55	2	(Argentina) Jeremías González	Yamaha	01:21:10	00:03:55
1	3	(Czech Republic) Tomáš Kubiena	IBOS	01:25:37	00:08:22	3	(Czech Republic) Tomáš Kubiena	IBOS	01:25:37	00:08:22
2	1	(Argentina) Nicolás Cavigliasso	Yamaha	04:22:10		1	(Argentina) Nicolás Cavigliasso	Yamaha	05:39:25	
2	2	(Argentina) Gustavo Gallego	Yamaha	04:33:28	00:11:18	2	(Argentina) Gustavo Gallego	Yamaha	06:00:39	00:21:14
2	3	(France) Alexandre Giroud	Yamaha	04:36:31	00:14:21	3	(France) Alexandre Giroud	Yamaha	06:04:27	00:25:02
3	1	(Argentina) Jeremías González	Yamaha	05:16:03		1	(Argentina) Nicolás Cavigliasso	Yamaha	10:57:12	
3	2	(Argentina) Nicolás Cavigliasso	Yamaha	05:17:47	00:01:44	2	(Argentina) Jeremías González	Yamaha	11:27:04	00:29:52
3	3	(Argentina) Gustavo Gallego	Yamaha	05:26:53	00:10:50	3	(Argentina) Gustavo Gallego	Yamaha	11:27:32	00:30:20
4	1	(Argentina) Nicolás Cavigliasso	Yamaha	04:52:07		1	(Argentina) Nicolás Cavigliasso	Yamaha	15:49:19	
4	2	(Argentina) Jeremías González	Yamaha	04:57:18	00:05:11	2	(Argentina) Jeremías González	Yamaha	16:24:22	00:35:03
4	3	(France) Alexandre Giroud	Yamaha	05:01:42	00:09:35	3	(Argentina) Gustavo Gallego	Yamaha	16:38:38	00:49:19
5	1	(Argentina) Nicolás Cavigliasso	Yamaha	05:08:11		1	(Argentina) Nicolás Cavigliasso	Yamaha	20:57:30	
5	2	(Argentina) Jeremías González	Yamaha	05:22:38	00:14:27	2	(Argentina) Jeremías González	Yamaha	21:47:00	00:49:30
5	3	(Argentina) Gustavo Gallego	Yamaha	05:24:18	00:16:07	3	(Argentina) Gustavo Gallego	Yamaha	22:02:56	01:05:26
Rest day
6	1	(Argentina) Nicolás Cavigliasso	Yamaha	05:14:40		1	(Argentina) Nicolás Cavigliasso	Yamaha	26:12:10	
6	2	(Argentina) Jeremías González	Yamaha	05:31:59	00:17:19	2	(Argentina) Jeremías González	Yamaha	27:18:59	01:06:49
6	3	(Argentina) Manuel Andújar	Yamaha	05:37:20	00:22:40	3	(Argentina) Gustavo Gallego	Yamaha	27:42:46	01:30:36
7	1	(Argentina) Nicolás Cavigliasso	Yamaha	05:04:48		1	(Argentina) Nicolás Cavigliasso	Yamaha	31:16:58	
7	2	(France) Alexandre Giroud	Yamaha	05:08:58	00:04:10	2	(Argentina) Jeremías González	Yamaha	32:32:34	01:15:36
7	3	(Argentina) Manuel Andújar	Yamaha	05:12:49	00:08:01	3	(Argentina) Gustavo Gallego	Yamaha	32:55:37	01:38:39
8	1	(Argentina) Nicolás Cavigliasso	Yamaha	05:18:53		1	(Argentina) Nicolás Cavigliasso	Yamaha	36:35:51	
8	2	(Argentina) Gustavo Gallego	Yamaha	05:28:03	00:09:10	2	(Argentina) Jeremías González	Yamaha	38:00:43	01:24:52
8	3	(Argentina) Jeremías González	Yamaha	05:28:09	00:09:16	3	(Argentina) Gustavo Gallego	Yamaha	38:19:55	01:44:04
9	1	(Argentina) Nicolás Cavigliasso	Yamaha	04:37:25		1	(Argentina) Nicolás Cavigliasso	Yamaha	41:13:16	
9	2	(Argentina) Manuel Andújar	Yamaha	04:41:31	00:04:06	2	(Argentina) Jeremías González	Yamaha	43:02:40	01:49:24
9	3	(Argentina) Gustavo Gallego	Yamaha	04:57:54	00:20:29	3	(Argentina) Gustavo Gallego	Yamaha	43:17:49	02:04:33
10	1	(Argentina) Nicolás Cavigliasso	Yamaha	01:48:38		1	(Argentina) Nicolás Cavigliasso	Yamaha	43:01:54	
10	2	(France) Alexandre Giroud	Yamaha	01:54:00	00:05:22	2	(Argentina) Jeremías González	Yamaha	44:57:31	01:55:37
10	3	(Argentina) Jeremías González	Yamaha	01:54:51	00:06:13	3	(Argentina) Gustavo Gallego	Yamaha	45:13:42	02:11:48

=== Cars ===
	Stage result					General classification				
Stage	Pos	Competitor	Make	Time	Gap	Pos	Competitor	Make	Time	Gap
1	1	(Qatar) Nasser Al-Attiyah (France) Matthieu Baumel	Toyota	01:01:41		1	(Qatar) Nasser Al-Attiyah (France) Matthieu Baumel	Toyota	01:01:41	
1	2	(Spain) Carlos Sainz (Spain) Lucas Cruz	Mini	01:03:40	00:01:59	2	(Spain) Carlos Sainz (Spain) Lucas Cruz	Mini	01:03:40	00:01:59
1	3	(Poland) Jakub Przygonski (Belgium) Tom Colsoul	Mini	01:03:41	00:02:00	3	(Poland) Jakub Przygonski (Belgium) Tom Colsoul	Mini	01:03:41	00:02:00
2	1	(France) Sébastien Loeb (Monaco) Daniel Elena	Peugeot	03:26:53		1	(South Africa) Giniel de Villiers (Germany) Dirk von Zitzewitz	Toyota	04:32:45	
2	2	(Spain) Nani Roma (Spain) Alex Haro Bravo	Mini	03:27:01	00:00:08	2	(Netherlands) Bernhard ten Brinke (France) Xavier Panseri	Toyota	04:33:13	00:00:28
2	3	(Netherlands) Bernhard ten Brinke (France) Xavier Panseri	Toyota	03:28:13	00:01:20	3	(Spain) Nani Roma (Spain) Alex Haro Bravo	Mini	04:33:27	00:00:42
3	1	(France) Stephane Peterhansel (France) David Castera	Mini	03:54:31		1	(Qatar) Nasser Al-Attiyah (France) Matthieu Baumel	Toyota	08:34:08	
3	2	(Qatar) Nasser Al-Attiyah (France) Matthieu Baumel	Toyota	03:57:57	00:03:26	2	(Saudi Arabia) Yazeed Al-Rajhi (Germany) Timo Gottschalk	Mini	08:40:56	00:06:48
3	3	(Poland) Jakub Przygonski (Belgium) Tom Colsoul	Mini	04:06:18	00:11:47	3	(France) Stephane Peterhansel (France) David Castera	Mini	08:41:11	00:07:03
4	1	(Qatar) Nasser Al-Attiyah (France) Matthieu Baumel	Toyota	03:38:49		1	(Qatar) Nasser Al-Attiyah (France) Matthieu Baumel	Toyota	12:12:57	
4	2	(France) Stephane Peterhansel (France) David Castera	Mini	03:40:41	00:01:52	2	(France) Stephane Peterhansel (France) David Castera	Mini	12:21:52	00:08:55
4	3	(Poland) Jakub Przygonski (Belgium) Tom Colsoul	Mini	03:47:21	00:08:32	3	(Spain) Nani Roma (Spain) Alex Haro Bravo	Mini	12:33:48	00:20:51
5	1	(France) Sébastien Loeb (Monaco) Daniel Elena	Peugeot	04:56:34		1	(Qatar) Nasser Al-Attiyah (France) Matthieu Baumel	Toyota	17:19:53	
5	2	(Qatar) Nasser Al-Attiyah (France) Matthieu Baumel	Toyota	05:06:56	00:10:22	2	(France) Stephane Peterhansel (France) David Castera	Mini	17:44:35	00:24:42
5	3	(Spain) Nani Roma (Spain) Alex Haro Bravo	Mini	05:20:38	00:24:04	3	(Spain) Nani Roma (Spain) Alex Haro Bravo	Mini	17:54:26	00:34:33
Rest day
6	1	(France) Sébastien Loeb (Monaco) Daniel Elena	Peugeot	03:39:21		1	(Qatar) Nasser Al-Attiyah (France) Matthieu Baumel	Toyota	21:01:31	
6	2	(Qatar) Nasser Al-Attiyah (France) Matthieu Baumel	Toyota	03:41:38	00:02:17	2	(France) Sébastien Loeb (Monaco) Daniel Elena	Peugeot	21:39:14	00:37:43
6	3	(Spain) Carlos Sainz (Spain) Lucas Cruz	Mini	03:46:17	00:06:56	3	(France) Stephane Peterhansel (France) David Castera	Mini	21:42:45	00:41:14
7	1	(France) Stephane Peterhansel (France) David Castera	Mini	04:00:01		1	(Qatar) Nasser Al-Attiyah (France) Matthieu Baumel	Toyota	25:13:30	
7	2	(Spain) Nani Roma (Spain) Alex Haro Bravo	Mini	04:04:34	00:04:33	2	(France) Stephane Peterhansel (France) David Castera	Mini	25:42:46	00:29:16
7	3	(Spain) Carlos Sainz (Spain) Lucas Cruz	Mini	04:09:29	00:09:28	3	(Spain) Nani Roma (Spain) Alex Haro Bravo	Mini	25:51:29	00:37:59
8	1	(France) Sébastien Loeb (Monaco) Daniel Elena	Peugeot	03:54:53		1	(Qatar) Nasser Al-Attiyah (France) Matthieu Baumel	Toyota	29:15:50	
8	2	(Qatar) Nasser Al-Attiyah (France) Matthieu Baumel	Toyota	04:02:20	00:07:27	2	(Spain) Nani Roma (Spain) Alex Haro Bravo	Mini	30:02:19	00:46:29
8	3	(Poland) Jakub Przygonski (Belgium) Tom Colsoul	Mini	04:10:08	00:15:15	3	(France) Sébastien Loeb (Monaco) Daniel Elena	Peugeot	30:02:35	00:46:45
9	1	(Qatar) Nasser Al-Attiyah (France) Matthieu Baumel	Toyota	03:53:22		1	(Qatar) Nasser Al-Attiyah (France) Matthieu Baumel	Toyota	33:09:12	
9	2	(Spain) Nani Roma (Spain) Alex Haro Bravo	Mini	03:58:20	00:04:58	2	(Spain) Nani Roma (Spain) Alex Haro Bravo	Mini	34:00:39	00:51:27
9	3	(South Africa) Giniel de Villiers (Germany) Dirk von Zitzewitz	Toyota	04:00:37	00:07:15	3	(France) Sébastien Loeb (Monaco) Daniel Elena	Peugeot	35:11:49	02:02:37
10	1	(Spain) Carlos Sainz (Spain) Lucas Cruz	Mini	01:20:01		1	(Qatar) Nasser Al-Attiyah (France) Matthieu Baumel	Toyota	34:38:14	
10	2	(France) Sébastien Loeb (Monaco) Daniel Elena	Peugeot	01:20:43	00:00:42	2	(Spain) Nani Roma (Spain) Alex Haro Bravo	Mini	35:24:56	00:46:42
10	3	(France) Cyril Despres (France) Jean Paul Cottret	Mini	01:22:32	00:02:31	3	(France) Sébastien Loeb (Monaco) Daniel Elena	Peugeot	36:32:32	01:54:18

=== UTV's ===
	Stage result					General classification				
Stage	Pos	Competitor	Make	Time	Gap	Pos	Competitor	Make	Time	Gap
1	1	(Brazil) Reinaldo Varela (Brazil) Gustavo Gugelmin	Can-Am	01:11:13		1	(Brazil) Reinaldo Varela (Brazil) Gustavo Gugelmin	Can-Am	01:11:13	
1	2	(Chile) Francisco López (Chile) Álvaro León	Can-Am	01:12:40	00:01:27	2	(Chile) Francisco López (Chile) Álvaro León	Can-Am	01:12:40	00:01:27
1	3	(Spain) Gerard Farres (Spain) Daniel Oliveras	Can-Am	01:13:45	00:02:32	3	(Spain) Gerard Farres (Spain) Daniel Oliveras	Can-Am	01:13:45	00:02:32
2	1	(Chile) Francisco López (Chile) Álvaro León	Can-Am	04:09:47		1	(Brazil) Reinaldo Varela (Brazil) Gustavo Gugelmin	Can-Am	05:21:19	
2	2	(Brazil) Reinaldo Varela (Brazil) Gustavo Gugelmin	Can-Am	04:10:06	00:00:19	2	(Chile) Francisco López (Chile) Álvaro León	Can-Am	05:22:27	00:01:08
2	3	(Russia) Sergey Karyakin (Russia) Anton Vlasiuk	BRP	04:11:38	00:01:51	3	(Russia) Sergey Karyakin (Russia) Anton Vlasiuk	BRP	05:27:54	00:06:35
3	1	(Spain) Gerard Farres (Spain) Daniel Oliveras	Can-Am	04:35:58		1	(Chile) Francisco López (Chile) Álvaro León	Can-Am	10:00:28	
3	2	(Chile) Francisco López (Chile) Álvaro León	Can-Am	04:38:01	00:02:03	2	(Spain) Gerard Farres (Spain) Daniel Oliveras	Can-Am	10:03:52	00:03:24
3	3	(Russia) Sergey Karyakin (Russia) Anton Vlasiuk	BRP	04:40:40	00:04:42	3	(Russia) Sergey Karyakin (Russia) Anton Vlasiuk	BRP	10:08:34	00:08:06
4	1	(Russia) Sergey Karyakin (Russia) Anton Vlasiuk	BRP	04:23:59		1	(Russia) Sergey Karyakin (Russia) Anton Vlasiuk	BRP	14:32:33	
4	2	(Chile) Rodrigo Moreno Piazzoli (Chile) Jorge Araya	Can-Am	04:38:25	00:14:26	2	(Spain) Gerard Farres (Spain) Daniel Oliveras	Can-Am	14:43:59	00:11:26
4	3	(Spain) Gerard Farres (Spain) Daniel Oliveras	Can-Am	04:40:07	00:16:08	3	(Chile) Rodrigo Moreno Piazzoli (Chile) Jorge Araya	Can-Am	15:02:33	00:30:00
5	1	(Chile) Rodrigo Moreno Piazzoli (Chile) Jorge Araya	Can-Am	06:33:52		1	(Chile) Rodrigo Moreno Piazzoli (Chile) Jorge Araya	Can-Am	21:36:25	
5	2	(Brazil) Reinaldo Varela (Brazil) Gustavo Gugelmin	Can-Am	06:35:04	00:01:12	2	(Brazil) Reinaldo Varela (Brazil) Gustavo Gugelmin	Can-Am	21:38:07	00:01:42
5	3	(Spain) Gerard Farres (Spain) Daniel Oliveras	Can-Am	07:06:34	00:32:42	3	(Spain) Gerard Farres (Spain) Daniel Oliveras	Can-Am	21:50:33	00:14:08
Rest day
6	1	(Chile) Francisco López (Chile) Álvaro León	Can-Am	04:12:08		1	(Spain) Gerard Farres (Spain) Daniel Oliveras	Can-Am	26:08:53	
6	2	(Spain) Gerard Farres (Spain) Daniel Oliveras	Can-Am	04:24:39	00:12:31	2	(Russia) Sergey Karyakin (Russia) Anton Vlasiuk	BRP	26:22:24	00:13:31
6	3	(United States) Casey Currie (Spain) Rafael Tornabell	Can-Am	04:29:04	00:16:56	3	(Brazil) Reinaldo Varela (Brazil) Gustavo Gugelmin	Can-Am	26:41:29	00:32:36
7	1	(Chile) Francisco López (Chile) Álvaro León	Can-Am	04:30:08		1	(Brazil) Reinaldo Varela (Brazil) Gustavo Gugelmin	Can-Am	31:33:41	
7	2	(Brazil) Reinaldo Varela (Brazil) Gustavo Gugelmin	Can-Am	04:52:12	00:22:04	2	(Chile) Francisco López (Chile) Álvaro León	Can-Am	31:37:44	00:04:03
7	3	(Chile) Rodrigo Moreno Piazzoli (Chile) Jorge Araya	Can-Am	04:53:16	00:23:08	3	(Chile) Rodrigo Moreno Piazzoli (Chile) Jorge Araya	Can-Am	32:19:07	00:45:26
8	1	(Chile) Francisco López (Chile) Álvaro León	Can-Am	04:38:34		1	(Chile) Francisco López (Chile) Álvaro León	Can-Am	36:16:18	
8	2	(Brazil) Cristian Baumgart (Brazil) Alberto Andreotti	Can-Am	04:43:21	00:04:47	2	(Chile) Rodrigo Moreno Piazzoli (Chile) Jorge Araya	Can-Am	37:10:28	00:54:10
8	3	(Spain) Gerard Farres (Spain) Daniel Oliveras	Can-Am	04:48:38	00:10:04	3	(Spain) Gerard Farres (Spain) Daniel Oliveras	Can-Am	37:24:27	01:08:09
9	1	(Brazil) Reinaldo Varela (Brazil) Gustavo Gugelmin	Can-Am	04:20:02		1	(Chile) Francisco López (Chile) Álvaro León	Can-Am	40:47:46	
9	2	(Spain) Gerard Farres (Spain) Daniel Oliveras	Can-Am	04:23:05	00:03:03	2	(Spain) Gerard Farres (Spain) Daniel Oliveras	Can-Am	41:47:32	00:59:46
9	3	(Chile) Francisco López (Chile) Álvaro León	Can-Am	04:31:28	00:11:26	3	(Brazil) Reinaldo Varela (Brazil) Gustavo Gugelmin	Can-Am	41:59:15	01:11:29
10	1	(Brazil) Reinaldo Varela (Brazil) Gustavo Gugelmin	Can-Am	01:25:09		1	(Chile) Francisco López (Chile) Álvaro León	Can-Am	42:19:05	
10	2	(Brazil) Cristian Baumgart (Brazil) Alberto Andreotti	Can-Am	01:28:48	00:03:39	2	(Spain) Gerard Farres (Spain) Daniel Oliveras	Can-Am	43:21:40	01:02:35
10	3	(Chile) Francisco López (Chile) Álvaro León	Can-Am	01:31:19	00:06:10	3	(Brazil) Reinaldo Varela (Brazil) Gustavo Gugelmin	Can-Am	43:24:24	01:05:19

=== Trucks ===
	Stage result					General classification				
Stage	Pos	Competitor	Make	Time	Gap	Pos	Competitor	Make	Time	Gap
1	1	(Russia) Eduard Nikolaev (Russia) Evgenii Iakovlev (Russia) Vladimir Rybakov	Kamaz	01:09:05		1	(Russia) Eduard Nikolaev (Russia) Evgenii Iakovlev (Russia) Vladimir Rybakov	Kamaz	01:09:05	
1	2	(Netherlands) Ton van Genugten (Netherlands) Bernard der Kinderen (Belgium) Peter Willemsen	Iveco	01:09:23	00:00:18	2	(Netherlands) Ton van Genugten (Netherlands) Bernard der Kinderen (Belgium) Peter Willemsen	Iveco	01:09:23	00:00:18
1	3	(Argentina) Federico Villagra (Argentina) Adrian Yacopini (Argentina) Ricardo Torlaschi	Iveco	01:09:58	00:00:53	3	(Argentina) Federico Villagra (Argentina) Adrian Yacopini (Argentina) Ricardo Torlaschi	Iveco	01:09:58	00:00:53
2	1	(Russia) Eduard Nikolaev (Russia) Evgenii Iakovlev (Russia) Vladimir Rybakov	Kamaz	03:47:51		1	(Russia) Eduard Nikolaev (Russia) Evgenii Iakovlev (Russia) Vladimir Rybakov	Kamaz	04:56:56	
2	2	(Netherlands) Gerard de Rooy (Poland) Darek Rodewald (Spain) Moisés Torrallardona	Iveco	03:50:30	00:02:39	2	(Netherlands) Gerard de Rooy (Poland) Darek Rodewald (Spain) Moisés Torrallardona	Iveco	05:01:19	00:04:23
2	3	(Russia) Dmitry Sotnikov (Russia) Dmitrii Nikitin (Russia) Ilnur Mustafin	Kamaz	03:53:19	00:05:28	3	(Argentina) Federico Villagra (Argentina) Adrian Yacopini (Argentina) Ricardo Torlaschi	Iveco	05:04:19	00:07:23
3	1	(Russia) Andrey Karginov (Russia) Andrey Mokeev (Russia) Igor Leonov	Kamaz	04:26:49		1	(Russia) Eduard Nikolaev (Russia) Evgenii Iakovlev (Russia) Vladimir Rybakov	Kamaz	09:37:46	
3	2	(Argentina) Federico Villagra (Argentina) Adrian Yacopini (Argentina) Ricardo Torlaschi	Iveco	04:38:44	00:11:55	2	(Argentina) Federico Villagra (Argentina) Adrian Yacopini (Argentina) Ricardo Torlaschi	Iveco	09:43:03	00:05:17
3	3	(Russia) Dmitry Sotnikov (Russia) Dmitrii Nikitin (Russia) Ilnur Mustafin	Kamaz	04:40:31	00:13:42	3	(Russia) Dmitry Sotnikov (Russia) Dmitrii Nikitin (Russia) Ilnur Mustafin	Kamaz	09:46:28	00:08:42
4	1	(Russia) Andrey Karginov (Russia) Andrey Mokeev (Russia) Igor Leonov	Kamaz	04:09:49		1	(Russia) Eduard Nikolaev (Russia) Evgenii Iakovlev (Russia) Vladimir Rybakov	Kamaz	13:52:04	
4	2	(Czech Republic) Martin Macik (Czech Republic) František Tomášek (Slovakia) Lukaš Kalanka	LIAZ	04:11:18	00:01:29	2	(Russia) Andrey Karginov (Russia) Andrey Mokeev (Russia) Igor Leonov	Kamaz	13:57:02	00:04:58
4	3	(Russia) Airat Mardeev (Russia) Dmitriy Svistunov (Russia) Akhmet Galiautdinov	Kamaz	04:22:36	00:12:47	3	(Russia) Dmitry Sotnikov (Russia) Dmitrii Nikitin (Russia) Ilnur Mustafin	Kamaz	14:00:43	00:08:39
5	1	(Netherlands) Ton van Genugten (Netherlands) Bernard der Kinderen (Belgium) Peter Willemsen	Iveco	05:52:44		1	(Russia) Eduard Nikolaev (Russia) Evgenii Iakovlev (Russia) Vladimir Rybakov	Kamaz	19:45:37	
5	2	(Russia) Eduard Nikolaev (Russia) Evgenii Iakovlev (Russia) Vladimir Rybakov	Kamaz	05:53:33	00:00:49	2	(Russia) Dmitry Sotnikov (Russia) Dmitrii Nikitin (Russia) Ilnur Mustafin	Kamaz	19:57:31	00:11:54
5	3	(Russia) Dmitry Sotnikov (Russia) Dmitrii Nikitin (Russia) Ilnur Mustafin	Kamaz	05:56:48	00:04:04	3	(Netherlands) Gerard de Rooy (Poland) Darek Rodewald (Spain) Moisés Torrallardona	Iveco	21:44:26	01:58:49
Rest day
6	1	(Netherlands) Gerard de Rooy (Poland) Darek Rodewald (Spain) Moisés Torrallardona	Iveco	04:34:10		1	(Russia) Eduard Nikolaev (Russia) Evgenii Iakovlev (Russia) Vladimir Rybakov	Kamaz	24:28:33	
6	2	(Argentina) Federico Villagra (Argentina) Adrian Yacopini (Argentina) Ricardo Torlaschi	Iveco	04:34:40	00:00:30	2	(Russia) Dmitry Sotnikov (Russia) Dmitrii Nikitin (Russia) Ilnur Mustafin	Kamaz	24:38:46	00:10:13
6	3	(Russia) Dmitry Sotnikov (Russia) Dmitrii Nikitin (Russia) Ilnur Mustafin	Kamaz	04:41:15	00:07:05	3	(Netherlands) Gerard de Rooy (Poland) Darek Rodewald (Spain) Moisés Torrallardona	Iveco	26:18:36	01:50:03
7	1	(Netherlands) Gerard de Rooy (Poland) Darek Rodewald (Spain) Moisés Torrallardona	Iveco	04:47:27		1	(Russia) Eduard Nikolaev (Russia) Evgenii Iakovlev (Russia) Vladimir Rybakov	Kamaz	29:50:35	
7	2	(Belarus) Siarhei Viazovich (Belarus) Pavel Haranin (Belarus) Andrei Zhyhulin	MAZ	05:18:22	00:30:55	2	(Russia) Dmitry Sotnikov (Russia) Dmitrii Nikitin (Russia) Ilnur Mustafin	Kamaz	30:23:29	00:32:54
7	3	(Russia) Eduard Nikolaev (Russia) Evgenii Iakovlev (Russia) Vladimir Rybakov	Kamaz	05:22:02	00:34:35	3	(Netherlands) Gerard de Rooy (Poland) Darek Rodewald (Spain) Moisés Torrallardona	Iveco	31:06:03	01:15:28
8	1	(Russia) Dmitry Sotnikov (Russia) Dmitrii Nikitin (Russia) Ilnur Mustafin	Kamaz	04:38:06		1	(Russia) Dmitry Sotnikov (Russia) Dmitrii Nikitin (Russia) Ilnur Mustafin	Kamaz	35:01:35	
8	2	(Netherlands) Ton van Genugten (Netherlands) Bernard der Kinderen (Belgium) Peter Willemsen	Iveco	05:00:07	00:22:01	2	(Russia) Eduard Nikolaev (Russia) Evgenii Iakovlev (Russia) Vladimir Rybakov	Kamaz	35:28:24	00:26:49
8	3	(Belarus) Siarhei Viazovich (Belarus) Pavel Haranin (Belarus) Andrei Zhyhulin	MAZ	05:01:19	00:23:13	3	(Netherlands) Gerard de Rooy (Poland) Darek Rodewald (Spain) Moisés Torrallardona	Iveco	36:09:18	01:07:43
9	1	(Russia) Eduard Nikolaev (Russia) Evgenii Iakovlev (Russia) Vladimir Rybakov	Kamaz	04:19:37		1	(Russia) Eduard Nikolaev (Russia) Evgenii Iakovlev (Russia) Vladimir Rybakov	Kamaz	39:24:52	
9	2	(Belarus) Siarhei Viazovich (Belarus) Pavel Haranin (Belarus) Andrei Zhyhulin	MAZ	04:33:40	00:14:03	2	(Russia) Dmitry Sotnikov (Russia) Dmitrii Nikitin (Russia) Ilnur Mustafin	Kamaz	39:53:27	00:28:35
9	3	(Russia) Dmitry Sotnikov (Russia) Dmitrii Nikitin (Russia) Ilnur Mustafin	Kamaz	04:47:20	00:27:43	3	(Netherlands) Gerard de Rooy (Poland) Darek Rodewald (Spain) Moisés Torrallardona	Iveco	41:00:02	01:35:10
10	1	(Netherlands) Ton van Genugten (Netherlands) Bernard der Kinderen (Belgium) Peter Willemsen	Iveco	01:28:21		1	(Russia) Eduard Nikolaev (Russia) Evgenii Iakovlev (Russia) Vladimir Rybakov	Kamaz	41:01:35	
10	2	(Czech Republic) Ales Loprais (Spain) Ferran Marco Alcayna (Czech Republic) Petr Pokora	Tatra	01:31:32	00:03:11	2	(Russia) Dmitry Sotnikov (Russia) Dmitrii Nikitin (Russia) Ilnur Mustafin	Kamaz	41:27:11	00:25:36
10	3	(Russia) Dmitry Sotnikov (Russia) Dmitrii Nikitin (Russia) Ilnur Mustafin	Kamaz	01:33:44	00:05:23	3	(Netherlands) Gerard de Rooy (Poland) Darek Rodewald (Spain) Moisés Torrallardona	Iveco	42:36:19	01:34:44

== Final standings ==
=== Bikes ===
Pos	No.	Rider	Brand	Time
1	3	(Australia) Toby Price	KTM	33:57:16
2	1	(Austria) Matthias Walkner	KTM	+0:09:13
3	14	(United Kingdom) Sam Sunderland	KTM	+0:13:34
4	6	(Chile) Pablo Quintanilla	Husqvarna	+0:20:46
5	47	(Argentina) Kevin Benavides	Honda	+0:41:14
6	29	(United States) Andrew Short	Husqvarna	+0:44:10
7	18	(France) Xavier de Soultrait	Yamaha	+0:54:00
8	9	(Chile) Jose Ignacio Cornejo Florimo	Honda	+1:08:06
9	77	(Argentina) Luciano Benavides	KTM	+1:09:10
10	7	(Spain) Oriol Mena	Hero	+2:08:41

=== Cars ===
Pos	No.	Driver	Codriver	Brand	Team	Time
1	301	(Qatar) Nasser Al-Attiyah	(France) Matthieu Baumel	Toyota	Toyota Gazoo Racing SA	34:38:14
2	307	(Spain) Nani Roma	(Spain) Alex Haro Bravo	Mini	X-Raid Team	+0:46:42
3	306	(France) Sébastien Loeb	(Monaco) Daniel Elena	Peugeot	PH-Sport	+1:54:18
4	303	(Poland) Jakub Przygoński	(Belgium) Tom Colsoul	Mini	Orlen Team/X-Raid Team	+2:28:31
5	308	(France) Cyril Despres	(France) Jean Paul Cottret	Mini	X-Raid Mini JCW Team	+2:48:43
6	305	(Czech Republic) Martin Prokop	(Czech Republic) Jan Tománek	Ford	MP-Sports	+3:19:02
7	314	(Saudi Arabia) Yazeed Al-Rajhi	(Germany) Timo Gottschalk	Mini	X-Raid Team	+4:30:56
8	321	(Chile) Boris Garafulic	(Portugal) Filipe Palmeiro	Mini	X-Raid Team	+7:57:58
9	302	(South Africa) Giniel de Villiers	(Germany) Dirk von Zitzewitz	Toyota	Toyota Gazoo Racing SA	+7:59:16
10	319	(France) Ronan Chabot	(France) Gilles Pillot	Toyota	Overdrive Toyota	+8:09:58

=== Quads ===
Pos	No.	Rider	Brand	Time
1	240	(Argentina) Nicolas Cavigliasso	Yamaha	43:01:54
2	241	(Argentina) Jeremías González Ferioli	Yamaha	+1:55:37
3	257	(Argentina) Gustavo Gallego	Yamaha	+2:11:48
4	250	(France) Alexandre Giroud	Yamaha	+4:02:41
5	273	(Argentina) Manuel Andújar	Yamaha	+6:38:10
6	255	(Poland) Kamil Wiśniewski	Can-Am	+8:33:09
7	269	(Chile) Luis Barahona	Yamaha	+12:28:31
8	260	(Argentina) Julio Estanguet	Can-Am	+15:19:07
9	252	(Argentina) Carlos Alejandro Verza	Yamaha	+17:18:59
10	262	(Peru) Emilio Choy	Yamaha	+17:36:50

=== Trucks ===
Pos	No.	Driver	Co-driver	Mechanic	Brand	Team	Time
1	500	(Russia) Eduard Nikolaev	(Russia) Evgeny Yakovlev	(Russia) Vladimir Rybakov	Kamaz	Kamaz - Master	41:01:35
2	514	(Russia) Dmitry Sotnikov	(Russia) Dmitrii Nikitin	(Russia) Ilnur Mustafin	Kamaz	Kamaz - Master	+0:25:36
3	503	(Netherlands) Gerard de Rooy	(Spain) Moises Torrallardona	(Poland) Darek Rodewald	Iveco	Petronas Team de Rooy Iveco	+1:34:44
4	505	(Argentina) Federico Villagra	(Argentina) Adrián Arturo Yacopini	(Argentina) Ricardo Adrian Torlaschi	Iveco	Petronas Team de Rooy Iveco	+5:49:08
5	507	(Czech Republic) Aleš Loprais	(Spain) Ferran Marco Alcayna	(Czech Republic) Petr Pokora	Tatra	Instaforex Loprais Team	+5:59:51
6	501	(Belarus) Siarhei Viazovich	(Belarus) Pavel Haranin	(Belarus) Andrei Zhyhulin	MAZ	MAZ - Sportauto	+6:39:29
7	509	(Netherlands) Ton van Genugten	(Netherlands) Bernard Der Kinderen	(Belgium) Peter Willemsen	Iveco	Petronas Team de Rooy Iveco	+9:15:26
8	519	(Belarus) Aleksandr Vasilevski	(Belarus) Dzmitry Vikhrenka	(Belarus) Anton Zaparoshchanka	MAZ	MAZ - Sportauto	+10:17:01
9	510	(Japan) Teruhito Sugawara	(Japan) Katsumi Hamura		Hino	Hino Team Sugawara	+11:22:09
10	513	(Netherlands) Maurik van den Heuvel	(Netherlands) Peter Kuijpers	(Netherlands) Martijn van Rooij	Iveco	Petronas Team de Rooy Iveco	+11:54:15

=== UTVs ===
Pos	No.	Driver	Co-driver	Brand	Team	Time
1	360	(Chile) Francisco López Contardo	(Chile) Alvaro Juan Leon Quintanilla	Can-Am	South Racing Can-Am	42:19:05
2	358	(Spain) Gerard Farres Guell	(Spain) Daniel Oliveras Carreras	Can-Am	Monster Energy Can-Am	+01:02:35
3	340	(Brazil) Reinaldo Varela	(Brazil) Gustavo Gugelmin	Can-Am	Monster Energy Can-Am	+01:05:19
4	343	(United States) Casey Currie	(Spain) Rafael Tornabell Cordoba	Can-Am	Monster Energy Can-Am	+02:32:51
5	421	(Chile) Rodrigo Javier Moreno Piazzoli	(Chile) Jorge Gabriel Araya Diaz	Can-Am	Can-Am Chile	+03:10:25
6	412	(Brazil) Marcos Baumgart	(Brazil) Kleber Cincea	Can-Am	X Rally Team	+03:48:02
7	372	(Portugal) Miguel Jordao	(Brazil) Lourival Roldan	Can-Am	South Racing Can-Am	+04:41:57
8	418	(Spain) Jose Antonio Hinojo Lopez	(Spain) Xavier Blanco	Can-Am	FN Speed Team	+05:05:56
9	398	(Brazil) Cristian Baumgart	(Brazil) Alberto Andreotti	Can-Am	X Rally Team	+05:22:28
10	344	(Russia) Sergey Karyakin	(Russia) Anton Vlasiuk	BRP	Snag Racing Team	+08:25:53

== Entry lists ==
=== Bikes ===
Entry list — Bikes

Brand	No.	Driver	
KTM	1	Matthias Walkner	Austria
Honda	2	Paulo Gonçalves	Portugal
KTM	3	Toby Price	Australia
Yamaha	4	Adrien van Beveren	France
Honda	5	Joan Barreda Bort	Spain
Husqvarna	6	Pablo Quintanilla	Chile
Hero	7	Oriol Mena	Spain
Yamaha	8	Franco Caimi	Argentina
Honda	10	Jose Ignacio Cornejo Florimo	Chile
KTM	11	Štefan Svitko	Slovakia
KTM	12	Juan Pedrero Garcia	Spain
KTM	14	Sam Sunderland	United Kingdom
Honda	15	Ricky Brabec	United States
Sherco	16	Michael Metge	France
KTM	17	Laia Sanz	Spain
Yamaha	18	Xavier de Soultrait	France
KTM	20	Armand Monleon	Spain
KTM	21	Ivan Jakeš	Slovakia
Honda	22	Diego Martin Duplessis	Argentina
Sherco	24	Adrien Metge	France
Yamaha	25	Rodney Faggotter	Australia
Husqvarna	26	Carlos Gracida Garza	Mexico
Hero	27	Joaquim Rodrigues	Portugal
Honda	28	Daniel Nosiglia Jager	Bolivia
Husqvarna	29	Andrew Short	United States
KTM	30	Marc Solà Terradellas	Spain
KTM	31	Fabricio Fuentes	Bolivia
KTM	32	Emanuel Gyenes	Romania
Husqvarna	33	Jacopo Cerutti	Italy
KTM	34	Mario Patrão	Portugal
KTM	36	Maciej Giemza	Poland
KTM	37	Loic Minaudier	France
KTM	38	Milan Engel	Czech Republic
KTM	39	Benjamin Melot	France
Husqvarna	41	Mohammed Balooshi	United Arab Emirates
Husqvarna	42	Maurizio Gerini	Italy
KTM	43	Adam Tomiczek	Poland
Kawasaki	44	Patricio Cabrera	Chile
KTM	45	Arnold Brucy	France
Husqvarna	46	Jan Brabec	Czech Republic
Honda	47	Kevin Benavides	Argentina
Sherco	48	Aravind Prabhakar	India
Husqvarna	49	Max Hunt	Great Britain
Hero	50	Santosh Chunchunguppe Shivashankar	India
KTM	51	Alberto Santiago Ontiveros	Argentina
KTM	52	David Megre	Portugal
KTM	53	Carlo Vellutino	Peru
Husqvarna	54	Fausto Mota	Spain
Husqvarna	55	Mirjam Pol	Netherlands
Husqvarna	56	Anastasiya Nifontova	Russia
Husqvarna	57	Gabriela Novotná	Czech Republic
Honda	58	Walter Nosiglia Jager	Bolivia
KTM	59	Petr Vlček	Czech Republic
KTM	60	Edwin Straver	Netherlands
Yamaha	61	Anthony Boursaud	France
KTM	62	Hugo Lopes	Portugal
Sherco	63	Lorenzo Santolino	Spain
KTM	64	Oscar Romero Montoya	Spain
Yamaha	65	Guillaume Chollet	France
KTM	66	Danny Robert Nogales Copa	Bolivia
KTM	67	Marcel Snijders	Netherlands
Husqvarna	68	Jan Veselý	Czech Republic
KTM	69	Florent Vayssade	France
KTM	70	Abdullah Al Shatti	Kuwait
KTM	71	Garrett Poucher	United States
KTM	72	Ben Young	Australia
Husqvarna	73	Skyler Howes	United States
KTM	74	Nicolas Brabeck-Letmathe	Austria
Yamaha	75	Antonio Maio	Portugal
KTM	77	Luciano Benavides	Argentina
Husqvarna	78	Antoine Rigaudeau	France
KTM	79	Simon Marcic	Slovenia
Bosuer	80	Willy Jobard	France
KTM	81	Sebastian Cavallero	Peru
KTM	82	Balys Bardauskas	Lithuania
KTM	83	Sjors Van Heertum	Netherlands
KTM	84	Ignacio Sanchis	Spain
KTM	85	Landry Maillet	France
KTM	86	Charlie Herbst	France
KTM	87	Oswaldo Burga	Peru
KTM	88	Fernando Hernandez	Argentina
KTM	89	Zhang Min	China
KTM	90	Zhao Hongyi	China
KTM	91	Gabor Saghmeister	Serbia
KTM	92	Arūnas Gelažninkas	Lithuania
KTM	93	Herwin Hopmans	Netherlands
KTM	94	Matias Notti	Argentina
Beta	95	Mirko Pavan	Italy
Beta	96	Mirco Miotto	Italy
KTM	97	Julien Toniutti	France
Yamaha	98	Sara Garcia	Spain
Yamaha	99	Javier Vega Puerta	Spain
KTM	100	Stuart Gregory	South Africa
KTM	101	Alejandro Silva	Chile
KTM	102	Rachid Al-Lal Lahadil	Spain
KTM	103	Antonio Lincoln Berrocal	Brazil
KTM	104	Nathan Rafferty	United States
KTM	106	Gerben Lieverdink	Netherlands
Husqvarna	108	Kenneth Gilbert	South Africa
KTM	109	Marcos Colvero	Brazil
KTM	110	Sebastian Bühler	Germany
Suzuki	111	Roberto Vecco	Peru
KTM	112	Stephane Bouvier	France
KTM	113	Sebastian Alberto Urquia	Argentina
KTM	114	Ross Branch	Botswana
KTM	115	Juan Puga	Ecuador
KTM	116	Jose Israel Borrell Gonzalez	Spain
KTM	117	Gabriele Minelli	Italy
Yamaha	119	Josep Maria Mas Arcos	Spain
Yamaha	120	Lkhamaa Namchin	Mongolia
KTM	121	James Alistair Ferguson	Australia
KTM	122	Guillaume Martens	Netherlands
KTM	123	Mark Tielemans	Netherlands
Husqvarna	124	Martien Jimmink	Netherlands
KTM	125	Frederic Barlerin	France
Husqvarna	126	Marcel Piek	Netherlands
Yamaha	127	Julio Luis Garcia Merino	Spain
Yamaha	128	Julian Jose Garcia Merino	Spain
Husqvarna	129	Paul Spierings	Netherlands
KTM	130	Gianna Velarde Sumary	Peru
Yamaha	132	Wesley Pittens	Netherlands
Hero	133	Ismael Nietto	Chile
KTM	134	Miguel Caetano	Portugal
Husqvarna	135	Daniel Albero Puig	Spain
KTM	136	Philippe Gendron	France
KTM	137	Cesar Pardo	Peru
KTM	138	Romain Leloup	France
KTM	139	Javier Alvarez Fernandez	Spain
KTM	141	Elio Aglioni	Italy
Kawasaki	142	Giordano Pacheco	Colombia
KTM	143	Nicola Dutto	Italy
KTM	144	Pablo Toral	Spain
KTM	145	Victor Rivera	Spain
KTM	146	Julian Villarrubia	Spain
KTM	147	Richard Main	Great Britain
KTM	148	Dmitry Agoshkov	Russia
Husqvarna	149	Gee Motzkin	Israel

=== Cars ===
Entry list — Cars

Brand	No.	Driver		Co-driver			
Mini	300	Carlos Sainz	Spain	Lucas Cruz	Spain		
Toyota	301	Nasser Al-Attiyah	Qatar	Matthieu Baumel	France		
Toyota	302	Giniel de Villiers	South Africa	Dirk von Zitzewitz	Germany		
Mini	303	Jakub Przygonski	Poland	Tom Colsoul	Belgium		
Mini	304	Stéphane Peterhansel	France	David Castera	France		
Ford	305	Martin Prokop	Czech Republic	Jan Tománek	Czech Republic		
Peugeot	306	Sébastien Loeb	France	Daniel Elena	Monaco		
Mini	307	Nani Roma	Spain	Alex Haro Bravo	Spain		
Mini	308	Cyril Despres	France	Jean Paul Cottret	France		
Toyota	309	Bernhard ten Brinke	Netherlands	Xavier Panseri	France		
Mini	310	Orlando Terranova	Argentina	Bernardo Graue	Argentina		
Toyota	311	Vladimir Vasilyev	Russia	Konstantin Zhiltsov	Russia		
Peugeot	312	Harry Hunt	Great Britain	Wouter Rosegaar	Netherlands		
Mini	314	Yazeed Al-Rajhi	Saudi Arabia	Timo Gottschalk	Germany		
Toyota	315	Antanas Juknevicius	Lithuania	Darius Vaiciulis	Lithuania		
Arctic Cat	316	Robby Gordon	United States	Kellon Walch	United States		
Toyota	317	Erik van Loon	Netherlands	Harmen Scholtalbers	Netherlands		
Geely	318	Wei Han	China	Min Liao	China		
Toyota	319	Ronan Chabot	France	Gilles Pillot	France		
Buggy (LCR 30)	320	Mathieu Serradori	France	Fabian Lurquin	Belgium		
Mini All4 Racing	321	Boris Garafulic	Chile	Filipe Palmeiro	Portugal		
Buggy	322	Nicolas Fuchs	Peru	Fernando Adrian Mussano	Argentina		
BMW	324	Isidre Esteve Pujol	Spain	Txema Villalobos	Spain		
Peugeot	325	Pierre Lachaume	France	Jean Michel Polato	France		
Geely	326	Philippe Gache	France	Stephane Prevot	Belgium		
Toyota	327	Aron Domzala	Poland	Maciej Marton	Poland		
Nissan	329	Jürgen Schröder	Germany	Daniel Schröder	Germany		
Toyota	330	Benediktas Vanagas	Lithuania	Sebastian Rozwadowski	Poland		
Ford	332	Tomas Ouředníček	Czech Republic	David Křípal	Czech Republic		
Peugeot	333	Jean-Pascal Besson	France	Jean Brucy	France		
Mercedes-Benz	334	Martin Maldonado	Argentina	Tomislav Glavic	Croatia		
Ssangyong	335	Oscar Fuertes Aldanondo	Spain	Diego Vallejo	Spain		
Borgward	336	Erik Wevers	Netherlands	Ashley Garcia Chavez	Peru		
Toyota	337	Vaidotas Zala	Lithuania	Saulius Jurgelenas	Lithuania		
Toyota	338	Jesus Calleja	Spain	Eduardo Blanco	Spain		
Toyota	339	Maik Willems	Netherlands	Robert Van Pelt	Netherlands		
Can-Am	345	Juan Silva	Argentina				
Arctic Cat	346	Cole Potts	United States	Max Eddy	United States		
Buggy (Jefferies)	347	Tim Coronel	Netherlands	Tom Coronel	Netherlands		
Toyota	349	Akira Miura	Japan	Laurent Lichtleuchter	France		
Toyota	350	Christian Lavieille	France	Jean-Pierre Garcin	France		
Mitsubishi	351	Cristina Gutierrez Herrero	Spain	Pablo Moreno Huete	Spain		
Toyota	352	Xavier Foj	Spain	Ignacio Santamaria	Argentina		
Buggy (Dunbee)	353	Stephane Henrard	Belgium	Gatien du Bois	Belgium		
Buggy (MDQ2)	354	Omar Eliseo Gandara	Argentina	Ramiro Corvalan	Argentina		
Buggy (Sodicars)	355	Philippe Boutron	France	Mayeul Barbet	France		
Buggy (LCR30)	356	Michael Pisano	France	Valentin Sarreaud	France		
Buggy (Optimus MD)	363	Remy Vauthier	Switzerland	Pascal Larroque	France		
Peugeot	364	Pierre Lafay	France	Sebastien Delaunay	France		
Volkswagen	365	Mauricio Salazar Velasquez	Colombia	Mauricio Salazar Sierra	Colombia		
Arctic Cat	367	Blade Hildebrand	United States	Bill Conger	United States		
Can-Am	368	Joan Font	Spain	Juan Felix Bravo Aguilar	Spain		
Can-Am	369	Vincent Guindani	France	Stephane Nguyen Quac Vinh	France		
Buggy (Mitjet Offroad)	370	Michiel Becx	Netherlands	Edwin Kuijpers	Netherlands		
Yamaha	371	Camelia Liparoti	Italy	Rosa Romero Font	Spain		
Yamaha	373	Alexis Hernandez	Peru	Ricardo Enrique Cisneros	Peru		
Mini	374	Denis Krotov	Russia	Dmytro Tsyro	Ukraine		
Can-Am	375	Adrien Goguet	France	Gregory Gilson	France		
Yamaha	377	Ahmed Alkuwari Fahad	Qatar	Angelo Montico	Italy		
Toyota	380	Marco Piana	France	Steven Griener	Switzerland		
Buggy (Predator)	381	Xavier Lormand	France	Guillaume Jorda	France		
Can-Am	382	Daniel Saskin	Croatia	Sasa Bitterman	Croatia		
Opel	383	Balazs Szalay	Hungary	Laszló Bunkoczi	Hungary		
Volkswagen	384	Fernando Ferrand Malatesta	Peru	Fernando Ferrand del Busto	Peru		
Toyota	386	Yuxiang Liang	China	Hongtao Kou	China		
Mitsubishi	387	Francisco Leon	Peru	Tomas Hirahoka	Peru		
Toyota	389	He Zhitao	China	Kai Zhao	China		
Buggy (Century CR6)	390	David Bensadoun	Canada	Patrick Beaulé	Canada		
Toyota	391	Jeromé Renaud	France	Max Delfino	France		
Toyota	392	Diego Weber	Peru	Juan Jose Ponce Aylwin	Ecuador		
Land Rover	394	Gerard Tramoni	France	Dominique Totain	France		
Buggy (Herrator)	395	Luis Fernando Barbery Paz	Bolivia	Hernan Daza Jimenez	Bolivia		
Can-Am	396	Thierry Pitavy	France	Gilles Colombet	France		
Chevrolet	399	Sebastian Guayasamin	Ecuador	Mauro Esteban Lipez	Argentina		
Can-Am	402	Emilio Ferrando	Spain	Guillermo Gomez de Las Heras	Spain		
Polaris	403	Anibal Aliaga	Peru	Gustavo Medina Luna	Peru		
Toyota	404	Alex Aguirregaviria	Spain	Jordi Comallonga	Spain		
Toyota	405	Miguel Angel Alvarez Pineda	Peru	Ricardo Mendiola	Peru		
Buggy (Raitec RA02)	406	Gianpaolo Bedin	Italy	Guido Toni	Italy		
Can-Am	408	Fabio Del Punta	Italy	Stefano Sinibaldi	Italy		
Holden	409	Stephen Riley	Australia	Trevor Hanks	Australia		
Toyota	411	Fernanda Kanno	Peru	Alonso Carrillo	Peru		
Can-Am	413	Byambatsogt Udiikhuu	Mongolia	Byambadelger Udiikhuu	Mongolia		
Can-Am	414	Diego Heilbrunn	Peru	Juan Pedro Cilloniz Duclos	Peru		
Can-Am	415	Dani Sola	Spain	Pedro Lopez Chaves	Spain		
Nissan	419	Thomas Bell	Great Britain	Patrick McMurren	Great Britain		
Toyota	420	Nicolas Falloux	France	Florian Gonzalez	France		
Can-Am	422	Bruno Afonso Martins	Portugal	Rui Jorge Pereira Ferreira	Portugal		
Ford	423	Andrea Schiumarini	Italy	Andrea Succi	Italy	Massimo Salvatore	Italy
Buggy (Henrard Dunbee)	424	Philippe Lambilliotte	Belgium	Maxime Lambilliotte	Belgium		
Polaris	425	Jean Remy Bergounhe	France	Patrick Sireyjol	France		
Toyota	426	Andrea Patricia Lafarja Bittar	Paraguay	Eugenio Arrieta	Argentina		
Toyota	428	Ramón Nuñez	Argentina	Fernando Matias Acosta	Argentina		
Nissan	429	Shameer Variawa	South Africa	Zaheer Bodhanya	South Africa		
Polaris	432	Nicolas Ricardo Zingoni	Argentina	Pedro Usandizaga	Argentina		
Polaris	433	Jacques Barron Mifflin	Peru	Lucas Barron	Peru		
Can-Am	434	Adrian Santos	Argentina	Oriol Vidal	Spain		
Can-Am	436	Jose Luis Alvarez	Spain	Joel Alvarez Moreno	Spain		
Can-Am	439	Bernd Hanns Hoffman	Germany	Juan Carlos Carignani	Germany		
Toyota	440	Luis Alayza	Peru	Ive Bromberg	Peru		

=== Quads ===
Entry list — Quads

Brand	No.	Driver	
Yamaha	240	Nicolás Cavigilasso	Argentina
Yamaha	241	Jeremías González Ferioli	Argentina
Yamaha	245	Nelson Augusto Sanabria Galeano	Paraguay
Yamaha	247	Axel Dutrie	France
Yamaha	250	Alexandre Giroud	France
Yamaha	252	Carlos Alejandro Verza	Argentina
IBOS	253	Tomáš Kubiena	Czech Republic
Can-Am	254	Martin Sarquiz	Argentina
Can-Am	255	Kamil Wiśniewski	Poland
Yamaha	257	Gustavo Gallego	Argentina
Honda	258	Walter Nosiglia	Bolivia
Yamaha	259	Sébastien Souday	France
Can-Am	260	Julio Estanguet	Argentina
Can-Am	261	Leonardo Martínez	Bolivia
Yamaha	262	Emilio Choy	Peru
Can-Am	263	Nicolás Robledo Serna	Colombia
Honda	264	Santiago Hansen	Argentina
Yamaha	265	John Maragozidis	Australia
Yamaha	266	Benoit Aubrion	France
Yamaha	267	Christian Jose Málaga Carpio	Peru
Yamaha	269	Luis Barahona	Chile
Yamaha	270	Giovanni Enrico	Chile
Can-Am	271	Javier Fernandez Diego	Uruguay
Yamaha	273	Manuel Andújar	Argentina
Yamaha	275	Gaston Ariel Mattarucco	Argentina
Yamaha	276	Italo Pedemonte	Chile

=== Trucks ===
Entry list — Trucks

Brand	No.	Driver		Co-driver		Mechanic	
Kamaz	500	Eduard Nikolaev	Russia	Evgeny Yakovlev	Russia	Vladimir Rybakov	Russia
MAZ	501	Siarhei Viazovich	Belarus	Pavel Haranin	Belarus	Andrei Zhyhulin	Belarus
Kamaz	502	Ayrat Mardeev	Russia	Dmitriy Svistunov	Russia	Akhmet Galiautdinov	Russia
Iveco	503	Gerard de Rooy	Netherlands	Moises Torrallardona	Spain	Darek Rodewald	Poland
LIAZ	504	Martin Macík	Czech Republic	František Tomášek	Czech Republic	Lukáš Kalanka	Slovakia
Iveco	505	Federico Villagra	Argentina	Adrián Arturo Yacopini	Argentina	Ricardo Adrian Torlaschi	Argentina
Renault Trucks	506	Martín van den Brink	Netherlands	Wouter de Graaff	Netherlands	Mitchel van den Brink	Netherlands
TATRA	507	Aleš Loprais	Czech Republic	Ferran Marco Alcayna	Spain	Petr Pokora	Czech Republic
TATRA	508	Martin Kolomý	Czech Republic	Jiří Stross	Czech Republic	Rostislav Plný	Czech Republic
Iveco	509	Ton van Genugten	Netherlands	Bernard Der Kinderen	Netherlands	Peter Willemsen	Belgium
HINO	510	Teruhito Sugawara	Japan	Katsumi Hamura	Japan		
MAZ	511	Aliaksei Vishneuski	Belarus	Maksim Novikau	Belarus	Andrei Neviarovich	Belarus
Renault Trucks	512	Gert Huzink	Netherlands	Martin Roesink	Netherlands	Rob Buursen	Netherlands
Iveco	513	Maurik van den Heuvel	Netherlands	Peter Kuijpers	Netherlands	Martijn van Rooij	Netherlands
Kamaz	514	Dmitry Sotnikov	Russia	Dmitrii Nikitin	Russia	Ilnur Mustafin	Russia
TATRA	515	Martin Šoltys	Czech Republic	Tomáš Šikola	Czech Republic	David Schovánek	Czech Republic
MAN SE	516	Alberto Herrero	Spain	Martin Pina Gonzalez	Spain	Paulo Fiuza	Portugal
HINO	517	Yoshimasa Sugawara	Japan	Ahito Sakurai	Japan		
Kamaz	518	Andrey Karginov	Russia	Andrey Mokeev	Russia	Igor Leonov	Russia
MAZ	519	Aleksandr Vasilevski	Belarus	Dzmitry Vikhrenka	Belarus	Anton Zaparoshchanka	Belarus
MAN SE	520	Mathias Behringer	Germany	Stefan Henken	Germany	Sean Berriman	South Africa
MAN SE	521	Jordi Juvanteny	Spain	Jose Luis Criado	Spain	Xavier Domenech	Spain
MAN SE	522	Gerrit Zuurmond	Netherlands	Jasper Riezebos	Netherlands	Klaas Kwakkel	Netherlands
Ford	523	Peter Van Delm	Belgium	Kurt Keysers	Belgium	Steven Vaesen	Belgium
DAF	524	Claudio Bellina	Italy	Giulio Minelli	Italy	Bruno Gotti	Italy
DAF	525	William de Groot	Netherlands	Ben Van De Laar	Netherlands	Bert Van Valkenburg	Netherlands
DAF	528	Richard de Groot	Netherlands	Jan Hulsebosch	Netherlands	Raph Van Den Elshout	Netherlands
DAF	529	Jordi Celma Obiols	Spain	Jose Martins	Portugal	Pierre Tuheil	France
Ford	530	Yves Rutten	Belgium	Christophe Franco	Belgium	Peter Convents	Belgium
Renault Trucks	531	Janus Van Kasteren	Netherlands	Erwin Van Den Bosch	Netherlands	Frank Van Hoof	Netherlands
MAN SE	532	Ed Wigman	Netherlands	Joel Ebbers	Netherlands	Hendrik Elisabert Schatorie	Netherlands
MAN SE	533	Rafael Tibau Maynou	Spain	Rafael Tibau Roura	Spain	Philipp Beier	Germany
Iveco	534	Dave Berghmans	Belgium	Bob Geens	Belgium	Damien Colin	Belgium
MAN SE	535	Zsolt Darzsi	Hungary	Fabien Catherine	France	Geoffrey Thalgott	France
DAF	536	Richard Gonzalez	France	Franck Maldonado	France	Jean-Philippe Salviat	France
Iveco	537	Michel Boucou	France	Jean-Francois Cazeres	France	Thomas Robineau	France
Iveco	538	Cesare Gianfranco Rickler Del Mare	Italy	Dragos Razvan Buran	Romania		
MAN SE	539	Filip Škrobánek	Czech Republic	Petr Lesák	Czech Republic	Radim Baculík	Czech Republic
MAN SE	540	Jordi Ginesta	Andorra	Frances Ester Fernandez	Spain	Marc Dardaillon	France
MAN SE	541	Ahmed Benbekhti	Algeria	Samir Benbekhti	Algeria	Ramzi Osmani	Algeria
MAN SE	542	Sylvain Besnard	France	Florence Deronce	France	Sylvain Laliche	France

=== UTVs ===
Entry list — UTVs

Brand	No.	Driver		Co-driver	
Can-Am	340	Reinaldo Varela	Brazil	Gustavo Gugelmin	Brazil
Polaris	341	Eric Abel	France	Christian Manez	France
Can-Am	342	Juan Carlos Vallejo	Chile	Leonardo Baronio	Peru
Can-Am	343	Casey Currie	United States	Rafael Tornabell Cordoba	Spain
Can-Am	344	Sergey Karyakin	Russia	Anton Vlasiuk	Russia
Can-Am	348	Cluade Fournier	France	Charly Gotlib	Belgium
Can-Am	358	Gerard Farres Guell	Spain	Daniel Oliveras Carreras	Spain
Polaris	359	Ronald Basso	France	Julien Menard	France
Can-Am	360	Francisco López Contardo	Chile	Alvaro Juan Leon Quintanilla	Chile
Yamaha	361	Ignacio Casale	Chile	Americo Aliaga	Chile
Polaris	362	Santiago Creel Garza Rios	Mexico	Szymon Gospodarczyk	Poland
Can-Am	366	Hernan Garces	Chile	Juan Pablo Latrach	Chile
Can-Am	372	Miguel Jordao	Portugal	Lourival Roldan	Brazil
Polaris	376	Maciej Domzala	Poland	Rafal Marton	Poland
Can-Am	378	Ricardo Porem	Portugal	Jorge Monteiro	Portugal
Can-Am	385	Annett Fischer	Germany	Andrea Peterhansel	Germany
Can-Am	388	Luis Eguiguren	Chile	Sebastian Palma	Chile
Can-Am	397	Bruno Varela	Brazil	Maykel Justo	Brazil
Can-Am	398	Cristian Baumgart	Brazil	Alberto Andreotti	Brazil
Yamaha	401	Pedro de Mello Breyner	Portugal	Javier Eduardo Uribe Godoy	Peru
Can-Am	407	Sandro Peppi	Chile	Raimundo Peppi	Chile
Can-Am	410	Alvaro Chicharro	Chile	Alvaro Chicharro Jr.	Chile
Can-Am	412	Marcos Baumgart	Brazil	Kleber Cincea	Brazil
Can-Am	416	Roberto Carranza	Spain	Juan Carlos Fernandez	Spain
Can-Am	417	Aleksandr Dorossinskij	Russia	Oleg Uperenko	Latvia
Can-Am	418	Jose Antonio Hinojo Lopez	Spain	Xavier Blanco	Spain
Can-Am	421	Rodrigo Javier Moreno Piazzoli	Chile	Jorge Gabriel Araya Diaz	Chile
Can-Am	427	Michelangelo Bertolla	Chile	Paolo Boggioni	Chile
Can-Am	431	Jose Salaverry	Peru	Paul Aray	Peru
Can-Am	435	Olga Roučková	Czech Republic	Daniel Zelenka	Czech Republic
