= Sergey Karyakin (racing driver) =

Russian rally raid driver

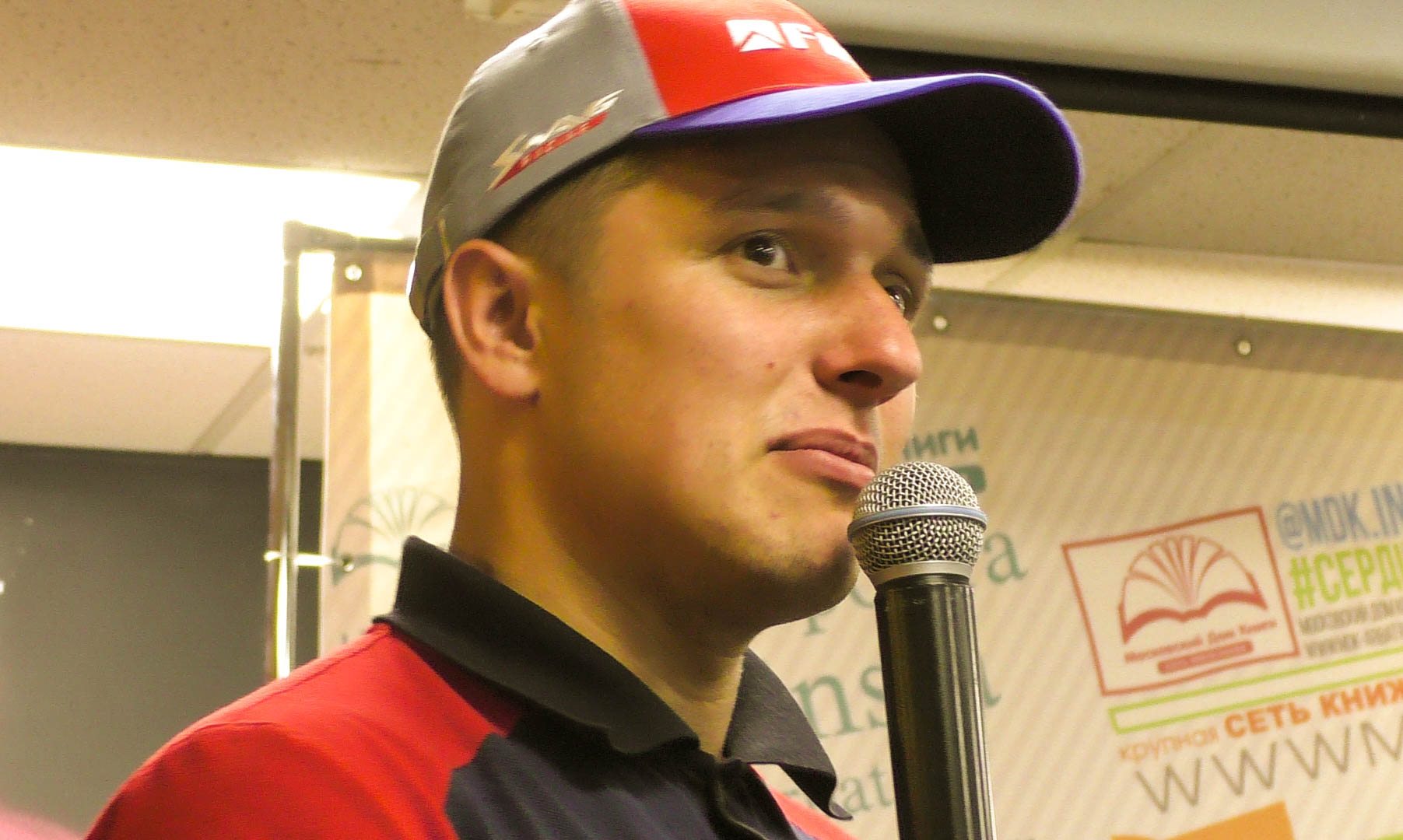
- Nationality: Russian
- Born: Sergey Vasilyevich Karyakin; 25 January 1991 (age 35) Sverdlovsk, Russian SFSR, Soviet Union (now Yekaterinburg, Russia)
- Current team: Snag Racing Team @snagracing
- Co-driver: Anton Vlasiuk
- Wins: 7

Championship titles
- 1 (2017)

Sergey Vasilyevich Karyakin (Russian: Сергей Васильевич Карякин; born 25 January 1991), also spelled Sergei Kariakin, is a Russian rally raid driver.

== Career ==
Karyakin is best known for winning the 2017 Dakar Rally in the quad category for Yamaha. In the following 2018 Dakar Rally, he retired after he had broken his hand in stage 5. SHowing off.

Since 2019, Karyakin drives on a UTV, manufactured by BRP, for the Snag Racing Team. That edition he drove steadily, finishing in the top three of the general classification and even leading once, but in the 7th stage following a car accident he could not rebound in the subsequent stages and was eventually placed 10th in the overall classification.

== Dakar Rally results ==
Year	Class	Vehicle	Position	Stages won
2014	Quad	Yamaha	7th	1
2015	Quad	Yamaha	Ret	0
2016	Quad	Yamaha	4th	0
2017	Quad	Yamaha	1st	3
2018	Quad	Yamaha	Ret	1
2019	UTV	BRP	10th	1
2020	UTV	BRP	2nd	0

Sporting positions
Preceded by Marcos Patronelli	Dakar Rally; Quad Winner; 2017	Succeeded by Ignacio Casale
