= Antanas Juknevičius =

Personal information
- Nationality: (Lithuania) Lithuanian
- Born: 13 June 1974 (age 52)
- Height: 170 cm (5 ft 7 in)
- Weight: 70 kg (154 lb)
- Website: https://dakaras.lt

Sport
- Country: Lithuania
- Sport: Rally raid
- Team: KREDA

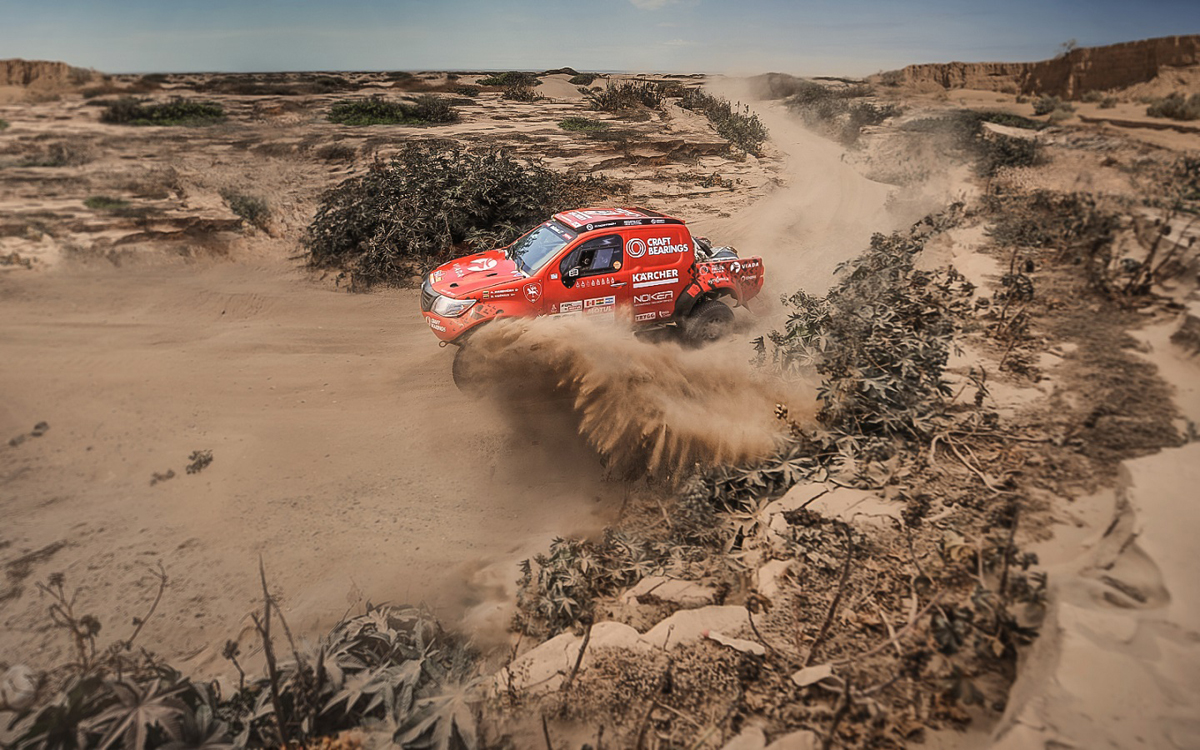
Juknevicius at the 2018 Dakar Rally

Antanas Juknevičius (born 13 June 1974) is a Lithuanian rally driver. He is one of the most experienced and successful professional Rally-raid drivers in Lithuania. Juknevicius is the only driver from the Baltic states to participate in every single stage of the FIA World Cup for Cross Country Rallies.

== Career ==
Juknevičius debuted in his first Dakar Rally back in 2003 as a co-driver for Aurelijus Petraitis. In 2009, Antanas Juknevicius and Aurelijus Petraitis crossed the finish line of the Dakar Rally in the 25th position overall which at the time was his personal best result. In 2018 Juknevicius improved his personal record by finishing the Dakar Rally in 12th position, after gaining four places during the penultimate stage of a rally. Overall, Antanas Juknevicius has participated in the Dakar Rally 11 times, 8 times as a driver and his first 3 rallies as a co-driver. This does not include the rally in 2008, where he was also at the start line but rally was cancelled.

Juknevičius is also one of the few Dakar Rally participants who took part in this event in all three continents this rally marathon has been held over the years.

In addition to his racing career Juknevičius spent five years working for Astana Racing as a general team manager.

In 2019, Antanas Juknevicius was officially granted status of Dakar Rally legend.

== Dakar Rally ==
Juknevičius has reached the finish line in 11 out of 12 Dakar Rallies he has started at with his personal best result being 12th overall in 2018. Since the introduction of T1+ class in 2022 Juknevičius sought to upgrade to a T1+ vehicle for the 2023 Dakar Rally. After failing to secure one, he opted to skip the event.

Year	Class	Vehicle	Position
2003	Cars	(Japan) Toyota	52nd
2004	Cars	(Japan) Toyota	DNF
2008	Event cancelled		
2009	Cars	(Latvia) Oscar	25th
2014	Cars	(Japan) Toyota Hilux 2016 IRS	56th
2015	Cars	(Japan) Toyota Hilux 2016 IRS	60th
2016	Cars	(Japan) Toyota Hilux 2016 IRS	27th
2017	Cars	(Japan) Toyota Hilux 2016 IRS	21st
2018	Cars	(Japan) Toyota Hilux 2016 IRS	12th
2019	Cars	(Japan) Toyota Hilux 2016 IRS	35th
2020	Cars	(Japan) Toyota Hilux 2016 IRS	20th
2021	Cars	(Japan) Toyota Hilux 2016 IRS	23rd
2022	Cars	(Japan) Toyota Hilux 2016 IRS	42nd

== Career achievements ==
- Dakar Rally 2018 - 12th place overall
- Rally Kazakhstan 2017 – 6th place overall
- Rally Kazakhstan 2016 – 3rd place overall, 1st in T2 category
- Abu Dhabi Desert Challenge 2011 – 6th place overall
- Dakar series / Silk Way Rally 2009 – 10th place overall
- Libya Desert Challenge 2008 - 1st place overall
- BAJA (LT) 2007 - 1st place overall
- BAJA (LV) 2007 - 2nd place overall
- BAJA (BY) 2006 - 1st place overall
- Optic Tunis 2006 - 8th place overall
- PHARAONS Rally Egypt 2006 - 7th place overall
- 24 Heures de FRANCE 2006 - 4th place overall
- Oman Desert Challenge 2006 - 2nd place overall
- UAE Dubai Rally 2005 - 9th place overall
