= Reinaldo Varela =

Brazilian four-wheeler motorcycle rider

- Born: 17 April 1959 (age 67) São Paulo, Brazil
- Teams: Can-Am
- Championships: Dakar Rally
- Wins: 2018

Reinaldo Varela (born 17 April 1959) is a Brazilian rally raid racer in the car and later Side-by-side categories. He had been a two-time world champion in the T2 class car category and won the Rally dos Sertões in the car category twice. In 2018, he entered the Dakar Rally in the Side by Side category, winning five stages and triumphing in the general classification, being his navigator the Brazilian Gustavo Gugelmin.

== Career results ==
=== Rally Dakar results ===
Year	Class	Vehicle	Position	Stages won
2000	Car	(Brazil) Troller	DNF	0
2001	Car	(Brazil) Troller	22nd	0
2009	Car	(Japan) Mitsubishi	DNF	0
2010	Car	(Japan) Mitsubishi	DNF	0
2013	Car	(Canada) Can-Am	57th	0
2014	Car	(Japan) Mitsubishi	DNF	0
2018	SSV	(Canada) Can-Am	1st	5
2019	SSV	(Canada) Can-Am	3rd	3
2020	SSV	(Canada) Can-Am	9th	2
2021	SSV	(Canada) Can-Am	5th	1
