= Peter van Merksteijn =

Peter van Merksteijn may refer to:

- Peter van Merksteijn Sr. (born 1956), Dutch racing and rally driver, father of Jr.
- Peter van Merksteijn Jr. (born 1982), Dutch rally driver, son of Sr.
