= Alexis Hernández =

- Born: Alexis Francisco Hernández Arias Ponce; December 20, 1984 (age 41) Lima, Peru

2018 Dakar Rally career
- Debut season: 2013
- Current team: 700R Yamaha
- Car number: 248

Alexis Hernández (born December 20, 1984) is a motorcyclist and pilot of Peruvian ATVs, has been multiple champion of national motorcycling tournaments in different modalities. He participated in editions of the Dakar Series. He debuted in the 2013 Dakar Rally in the ATV category.

== Dakar Rally results ==
Year	Class	Vehicle	Position	Stages won
2013	Quad	(Japan) Yamaha	DNF	0
2014	Quad	(Japan) Yamaha	14th	0
2016	Quad	(Japan) Yamaha	8th	1
2018	Quad	(Japan) Yamaha	5th	0

== See also ==
- Sports in Peru
