= Nicolás Cavigliasso =

Argentine racing driver (born 1991)

- Born: 3 September 1991 (age 35) General Cabrera, Argentina
- Teams: Yamaha
- Championships: Dakar Rally
- Wins: 2019

Nicolás Cavigliasso (born 3 September 1991) is an Argentine racing driver who specializes in rally raid in the quads and Challenger categories. In 2017, he won the Merzouga Dakar Series in Morocco (Six Day Dakar), and he was Argentine champion of Quadcross X, 4x2 ATV Quads.

Cavigliasso won the 2019 Dakar Rally in the quad category from start to finish, winning nine of the ten stages. In 2023, Cavigliasso moved into the T4 car category ahead of the Dakar Rally, being co-driven by his wife Valentina Pertegarini. The pair contested the World Rally-Raid Championship in 2024, driving in the Challenger class. Cavigliasso finished second in the drivers' standings, as Pertegarini won the co-drivers' title.

At the start of 2025, Cavigliasso won the Challenger class of the 2025 Dakar Rally alongside Pertegarini.

== Rally results ==
=== Complete World Rally-Raid Championship results ===
(key)

Year	Team	Car	Class	1	2	3	4	5	Pos.	Points
2023	Drag'on Rally Team	Can-Am Maverick XRS Turbo	T4	DAK; 10^{13}	ABU	SON	DES	MOR	13th	13
2024	South Racing Can-Am	Can-Am Maverick XRS Turbo	Challenger	DAK; 9^{50}	ABU; 7^{30}	PRT; 3^{42}	DES; 2^{44}	MOR; 4^{22}	2nd	187
2025	Team BBR	Taurus T3 Max	Challenger	DAK; 1^{82}	ABU; 7^{22}	ZAF; 2^{43}	PRT; 4^{21}	MOR; 2^{38}	1st	206
2026	Vertical Motorsport	Taurus T3 Max	Challenger	DAK; 3^{57}	PRT	DES	MOR	ABU	3rd*	57

* Season still in progress
