= 2021 Dakar Rally =

Off-road motorsport event in Saudi Arabia

Part of the Dakar Rally
← Previous event	Next event →
- Host country: Saudi Arabia
- Dates run: 3–15 January 2021
- Start: (Saudi Arabia) Jeddah
- Finish: (Saudi Arabia) Jeddah
- Stages: 12
- Stage surface: Sand, rocks, dirt, tarmac

Results
- Cars winner: (France) Stéphane Peterhansel (France) Edouard Boulanger; Bahrain JCW X-Raid
- Bikes winner: (Argentina) Kevin Benavides; Monster Energy Honda
- Quads winner: (Argentina) Manuel Andújar; 7240 Team
- Light prototypes winner: (Czech Republic) Josef Macháček (Czech Republic) Pavel Vyoral; Buggyra Zero Mileage Racing
- UTVs winner: (Chile) Francisco Lopez Contardo (Chile) Juan Pablo Latrach Vinagre; South Racing Can-Am
- Trucks winner: (Russia) Dmitry Sotnikov (Russia) Ruslan Akhmadeev (Russia) Ilgiz Akhmetzianov; Kamaz-Master
- Classics winner: (France) Marc Douton (France) Émilien Étienne; Team Sunhill
- Crews: 310 at start, 206 at finish

The 2021 Dakar Rally was a rally raid event held in Saudi Arabia and the 43rd edition of the Dakar Rally. The event was held for 14 days, starting from 3 January and ended 15 January 2021. It was the second time Saudi Arabia had hosted the event, with support from the Saudi Automobile and Motorcycle Federation. The race started and ended in Jeddah, allowing the competitors to venture through the desert and alongside the Red Sea. The route consists of one prologue stage and 12 normal stages, with one rest day in Ha'il on 9 January. The rally was originally intended to run through 2–3 additional countries, with Egypt and Jordan being rumoured likely candidates. However, due to travel and border restrictions implemented in response to the COVID-19 pandemic, the route stayed entirely within Saudi Arabian territory.

== Summary ==
=== The route ===
A completely new route has been put together, described as a lot slower, more varied, and more technical. The route includes 1 Prologue stage, 12 stages including 2 loop stages, 1 marathon stage. The exact route was revealed in November 2020.

=== Changes ===
There will be a Prologue stage that will determine the starting positions for Stage 1. The Road Books will only be distributed 10 min. prior to the start of the stage. There will be an option of a digital roadbook. New classifications will be introduced for T3: Light Proto, T4: SSV, T5: Truck. The Elite / Priority Driver list will be extended from bike only to all categories. Original by MOTUL category will continue, which limits and controls on the use of external assistance. Improvements in safety include a speed limit of 90 km/h in hazardous sectors, mandatory first aid training certificate for all competitors, automatic Sentinel sound warning system for dangers classed level 2 and 3, and mandatory airbag vests for all bike and quad drivers. New regulations for Elite bikers will see a limit of 1 piston change and 6 rear tires for the whole rally; all tires will need to be the same brand and model. Bikers will not be allowed assistance during the refueling. The organizers are promoting vehicles using alternative energy sources by introducing a 50% registration fee discount in all categories, introducing a prize in the Alternative Energy Challenge, and introducing new regulations for these vehicles. Dakar Experience ranking and regulations have been revamped, it will only be available for amateur, non-Elite/Priority drivers. A new Dakar Classic class will be introduced for cars and trucks manufactured before 2000, or new cars built to original pre-2000 specification. These vehicles will share the same bivouac and the organization but will run in a parallel, yet different route, suitable for historic vehicles. The class will feature a reduced entry fee, yet the same rules and fees will apply for the assistance.

Further changes came just before the event, when revamped FIA regulations for Cross-Country rally stipulated speed limits across all categories. Vehicles in the T1 and T2 (Cars) categories were now restricted to 180 kilometres per hour (110 mph) while vehicles in the T3, T4, and T5 categories (Light Prototypes, UTVs, and Trucks) were limited to 130 kilometres per hour (81 mph). Motorcycles and Quads had already been subjected to speed limits for several years.

This year is the first time cars are allowed to run turbocharged petrol engines, previously only diesels could be turbocharged. The first makers to avail of this regulation were Prodrive with its new BRX Hunter car.

== Entry list ==
=== Number of entries ===
Stage	Bikes	Quads	Cars	UTVs	Trucks	Classics	Total
Entry list (Note: The entry list was published in November, there have been both additions and retractions from the list.) (Note: The numbers are official Dakar figures. In the November list there were 68 cars.)	108	21	67	58	42	26	322
At start line	101	16	64	61	44	24	310
Rest day	78	14	53	49	24	24	242
Finished (including Dakar Experience)	63(67)	11(12)	48(52)	41(50)	20(21)	23(23)	206(225)

=== Vehicles and Categories ===
Category	Bikes		Quads		Cars		SxS		UTVs		Trucks		Classics	
	Class	Description	Class	Description	Class	Description	Class	Description	Class	Description	Class	Description	Class	Description
	G1.1	A.S.O. "Elite"	G3.1	750cc 2WD quads	T1.1	T1 petrol 4x4 modified	T3.1	Light Prototypes	T4.1	Production SSVs turbo	T5.1	Production Trucks		
	G2.1	"Non-Elite" Super-Production	G3.2	900cc 4WD quads	T1.2	T1 diesel 4x4 modified			T4.2	Production SSVs non-turbo	T5.2	Modified Trucks		
	G2.2	"Non-Elite" "Marathon"			T1.3	T1 petrol 2WD modified					T4.3	Rapid Assistance Vehicles		
					T1.4	T1 diesel 2WD modified								
					T1.5	T1 with SCORE approval (Note: No participants in this category this year)								
					T2.1	T2 petrol production								
					T2.2	T2 diesel production								
					T2.C	T2 production other (Note: T2.C category is T2 production vehicles with obsolete FIA approval)								
					TAS	Special Stage Assistance								
					OP.1	Renewable Energy Powered								

Separate rankings for women and newcomers in each category, "Original by Motul" for bikes, as well as 6x6, <10 L engine size, alternative energies rankings for trucks.

Entry list — Bikes

Note
– The "Dakar Legends" - competitors that participated in 10 or more Dakar events.
– The first time starters - "rookies".
– Competitors that were not able to start the race.
– Competitors participating in "Original by Motul" — limited assistance marathon class.

No.	Driver	Bike	Team	Class
1	(United States) Ricky Brabec	Honda CRF450R	Monster Energy Honda Team 2021	G1.1
2	(Chile) Pablo Quintanilla	Husqvarna FR 450 Rally	Rockstar Energy Husqvarna Factory Facing	G1.1
3	(Australia) Toby Price	KTM 450 Factory	Red Bull KTM Factory Racing	G1.1
4	(Chile) José Ignacio Cornejo	Honda CRF450R	Monster Energy Honda Team 2021	G1.1
5	(United Kingdom) Sam Sunderland	KTM 450 Factory	Red Bull KTM Factory Racing	G1.1
6	(Argentina) Franco Caimi	Yamaha WR450F Rally	Monster Energy Yamaha Rally Team	G1.1
7	(United States) Andrew Short	Yamaha WR450F Rally	Monster Energy Yamaha Rally Team	G1.1
9	(United States) Skyler Howes	KTM 450 Rally Replica	BAS Dakar KTM Racing Team	G1.1
11	(Slovakia) Štefan Svitko	KTM 450 Rally Replica	Slovnaft Rally Team	G1.1
12	(France) Xavier de Soultrait	Husqvarna FR 450 Rally	HT Rally Raid Husqvarna Racing	G1.1
15	(Spain) Lorenzo Santolino	Sherco 450 RTR	Sherco TVS Rally Factory	G1.1
17	(Spain) Juan Pedrero García	KTM 450 Rally	FN Speed - Rieju Team	G1.1
18	(Botswana) Ross Branch	Yamaha WR450F Rally	Monster Energy Yamaha Rally Team	G1.1
19	(Portugal) Rui Jorge Gonçalves Dias	Sherco 450 RTR	Sherco TVS Rally Factory	G2.1
20	(Poland) Adam Tomiczek	Husqvarna FR 450 RR	Orlen Team	G2.1
21	(Australia) Daniel Sanders	KTM 450 Factory	Red Bull KTM Factory Racing	G2.1
22	(Poland) Maciej Giemza	Husqvarna FR 450 RR	Orlen Team	G2.1
23	(Slovakia) Ivan Jakeš	KTM 450 Rally Replica	Jakes Dakar Team	
24	(Germany) Sebastian Bühler	Hero 450 Rally	Hero Motosports Team Rally	G2.1
25	(Netherlands) Paul Spierings	Husqvarna FR 450 Rally	HT Rally Raid Husqvarna Racing	G2.1
26	(Czech Republic) Milan Engel	KTM 450 Rally Replica	Moto Racing Group	G2.1
27	(Portugal) Joaquim Rodrigues	Hero 450 Rally	Hero Motosports Team Rally	G2.1
29	(Romania) Emanuel Gyenes	KTM 450 Rally Replica	Autonet Motorcycle Team	G2.2
30	(Lithuania) Arūnas Gelažninkas	KTM 450 Rally Replica	Zigmas Dakar Team	G2.1
31	(Czech Republic) Martin Michek	KTM 450 Rally Replica	Moto Racing Group	G2.1
32	(Spain) Tosha Schareina	KTM 450 Rally	FN Speed - KTM Team	G2.2
33	(India) Harith Noah Koitha Veettil	Sherco 450 RTR	Sherco TVS Rally Factory	G2.1
34	(Portugal) Mário Patrão	KTM 450 Rally	Credit Agricola - Mario Patrao Motosport	
35	(Mexico) Juan Pablo Guillen Rivera	KTM 450 Rally 2021	Nomadas Adventure	G2.1
36	(Czech Republic) Jan Brabec	KTM 450 Rally Replica	Strojrent Racing	G2.1
37	(Czech Republic) David Pabiška	KTM 450 Rally	Jantar Team	G2.2
39	(France) Benjamin Melot	KTM 450 Rally Replica	Benjamin Melot	G2.1
41	(China) Zaker Yakp	KTM 450 Rally	Wu Pu Da Hai Dao Dakar Rally	G2.1
42	(France) Adrien Van Beveren	Yamaha WR450F	Monster Energy Yamaha Rally Team	G1.1
44	(Spain) Laia Sanz	Gas Gas 450 Rally	Gas Gas Factory Team	G1.1
45	(China) Zhang Min	KTM 450 Rally Replica	Wu Pu Da Hai Dao Dakar Rally	
46	(Slovenia) Simon Marčič	Husqvarna 450 Rally	Marcic	G2.2
47	(Argentina) Kevin Benavides	Honda CRF450R	Monster Energy Honda Team 2021	G1.1
48	(France) Mathieu Doveze	KTM 450 Rally	Nomade Racing Assistance	G2.2
50	(India) CS Santosh	Hero 450 Rally	Hero Motosports Team Rally	G2.1
51	(Spain) Rachid Al-Lal Lahadil	KTM 450 Rally Replica	Melilla Sport Capital	G2.2
52	(Austria) Matthias Walkner	KTM 450 Rally	Red Bull KTM Factory Racing	G1.1
53	(Czech Republic) Libor Podmol	Husqvarna FR 450 Rally	Podmol Dakar Team	G2.2
54	(France) Camille Chapeliere	KTM 450	Team Baines Rally	G2.1
55	(China) Zhao Hongyi	KTM 450 Rally	Wu Pu Da Hai Dao Dakar Rally	G2.2
56	(Colombia) Giordano Pacheco	KTM	Calidoso Racing Team	
58	(Spain) Eduardo Iglesias Sánchez	KTM 450 Rally Replica	FN Speed - Team Monforte Rally	G2.2
59	(Italy) Tiziano Interno	Beta RR430 Rally POV	Rally POV	G2.1
60	(France) Stéphane Darques	Yamaha WR450F	M.O.R.AL	G2.1
61	(France) Norbert Dubois	KTM 450	Aventure Moto 61	G2.1
62	(Australia) Andrew Joseph Houlihan	KTM 450 Rally Replica	Nomadas Adventure	G2.2
63	(Poland) Konrad Dąbrowski	KTM 450 Rally	Duust Rally Team	G2.2
65	(Italy) Franco Picco	Husqvarna FR 450 Rally	Team Franco Picco	G2.2
66	(France) Pascal Bouchet	KTM	Team Baines Rally	G2.1
67	(Czech Republic) Rudolf Lhotský	Husqvarna Rally Replica	Jantar Team	G2.2
68	(United Kingdom) Jamie McCanney	Yamaha WR450F	Monster Energy Yamaha Rally Team	G1.1
69	(Belgium) Walter Roelants	Husqvarna FR 450 Rally	HT Rally Raid Husqvarna Racing	G2.1
70	(Saudi Arabia) Mishal Alghuneim	KTM 450 Rally	Mishal Alghuneim	G2.1
71	(Bahrain) Salman Mohamed Humood Farhan Farhan	Husqvarna FR 450 Rally	HT Rally Raid Husqvarna Racing	G2.1
72	(France) Pascal Rauber	KTM 450 Rally	Team 2RM	G2.2
73	(Kuwait) Mohammed Jaffar	KTM 450 Rally Replica	Duust Rally Team	G2.1
74	(Spain) Jaume Betriu	KTM 450 Rally Replica	FN Speed - KTM Team	G2.1
76	(Czech Republic) Roman Krejčí	KTM 450 Rally Replica	Bo!Beton Team	G2.2
77	(Argentina) Luciano Benavides	Husqvarna FR 450 Rally	Rockstar Energy Husqvarna Factory Racing	G1.1
78	(Italy) Cesare Zacchetti	KTM 450 Rally	Cesare Zacchetti	G2.1
79	(France) Amaury Baratin	KTM 450 Rally	Horizon Moto 95	G2.1
80	(Australia) Michael Burgess	KTM 450	BAS Dakar KTM Racing Team	G2.1
81	(Slovakia) Erik Vlčák	Husqvarna Rally Replica	Slovnaft Rally Team	G2.2
82	(India) Ashish Raorane	KTM 450 Rally Replica	Ashish Raorane	G2.2
83	(Peru) David Chavez	KTM	Club Aventura Touareg	
84	(United Kingdom) Neil Hawker	Husqvarna 450 Rally	Neil Hawker	G2.2
85	(Portugal) Alexandre Azinhais	KTM 450 Rally Replica	Club Aventura Touareg	G2.1
86	(France) Charlie Herbst	KTM 450 Rally	Team Charlie Herbst	G2.1
87	(Spain) Oriol Mena	KTM	FN Speed - Rieju Team	G1.1
88	(Spain) Joan Barreda Bort	Honda CRF450R	Monster Energy Honda Team 2021	G1.1
89	(Serbia) Gabor Saghmeister	KTM 450 Rally Replica	Saghmeister Team	G2.1
90	(Italy) Francesco Catanese	Yamaha WR450F	Tuttogru	G2.1
92	(France) Eric Martinez	Husqvarna 450 Rally Replica	Eric Martinez	G2.2
93	(Italy) Piolini Lorenzo	KTM 450 Rally Replica	Caravanserraglio Rally Racing Team	G2.2
94	(France) Olivier Susset	Husqvarna 450 Rally	Xtreme Garage	G2.1
95	(France) Xavier Flick	Husqvarna 450 Rally	Xtrem Racing	G2.2
96	(Spain) Daniel Albero Puig	KTM 450 Rally Replica	Team Un Diabetico En El Dakar	G2.2
97	(Slovakia) Martin Benko	KTM 450 Rally Replica	Norwit Racing	G2.1
98	(Spain) Sara Garcia	Yamaha WR450F	Pont Grup Yamaha	G2.1
99	(Spain) Javier Vega Puerta	Yamaha WR450F	Pont Grup Yamaha	G2.2
100	(France) Audrey Rossat	KTM 450	Rossat Audrey	G2.1
101	(United Kingdom) David Knight	Husqvarna FR 450 Rally	HT Rally Husqvarna Racing	G2.1
102	(France) Sara Jugla	KTM 450 Rally Replica	Team Baines Rally	G2.1
104	(Saudi Arabia) Fawaz Altoaimi	Yamaha	Fawaz Racing	
105	(Spain) Fernando Dominguez	KTM 450 Rally Replica	Club Aventura Touareg	G2.1
107	(Italy) Giovanni Stigliano	Yamaha WR450F	Team JBRally	G2.1
108	(Spain) Marc Calmet	KTM 450 Rally	FN Speed - Rieju Team	G2.2
110	(Poland) Jacek Bartoszek	KTM 450 Rally Replica	Duust Rally Team	G2.1
111	(France) Pierre Cherpin	Husqvarna 450	Pierre Cherpin	G2.2
112	(Spain) Juan Campdera	KTM 450 Rally Replica	Juan Campdera	G2.2
114	(Spain) Eladio Carbonell Mendez	KTM 450 EXC F	Pikaeras Team	G2.1
115	(Netherlands) Olaf Harmsen	KTM 450 Rally Replica	Bas Dakar KTM Racing Team	G2.1
116	(France) Erick Blandin	KTM	Team Baines Rally	
117	(Botswana) James Alexander	Yamaha WR450F	The Kalahari Madala	G2.2
118	(Spain) Alexandre Bispo	KTM 450 Rally Replica	Expresso Racing	G2.2
120	(Colombia) Jhon Trejos	Husqvarna 450	Jhon Trejos	
121	(France) Guillaume Barthelemy	KTM EXC 450 F	Team RS Concept	G2.1
123	(Italy) Angelo Pedemonte	KTM 450 Rally	Pedemonte Angelo	G2.1
125	(France) Frédéric Barlerin	KTM 450 EXC	Rallye Fred	G2.2
126	(Spain) Diego Gamaliel Llanos	KTM	Diego Gamaliel Llanos	
127	(France) Willy Jobard	Garnati 450 H2 Hybrid Hydrogen	Garnati Racing	G2.1
133	(Italy) Cominardi Davide	Honda 450 Rally	Cominardi	G2.1
142	(Italy) Maurizio Gerini	Husqvarna FR 450 Rally	Solarys Racing	G2.1

Entry list — Quads

Note
– The "Dakar Legends" - competitors that participated in 10 or more Dakar events.
– The first time starters - "rookies".
– Competitors that were not able to start the race.
– Competitors participating in "Original by Motul" — limited assistance marathon class.

No.	Driver	Quad	Team
150	(Argentina) Nicolás Cavigliasso	Yamaha	Dragon Rally Team
151	(Poland) Rafał Sonik	Yamaha	Sonik Team
152	(France) Alexandre Giroud	Yamaha	Team Giroud
153	(Czech Republic) Tomáš Kubiena	Yamaha	Story Racing S.R.O.
154	(Argentina) Manuel Andújar	Yamaha	7240 Team
155	(Poland) Kamil Wiśniewski	Yamaha	Orlen Team
156	(France) Sebastien Souday	Yamaha	Team All TracksS
157	(France) Romain Dutu	Yamaha	SMX Racing
159	(Chile) Giovanni Enrico	Yamaha	Enrico Racing Team
160	(Argentina) Carlos Alejandro Verza	Yamaha	Verza Rally Team
162	(Colombia) Nicolas Robledo Serna	Can-Am	Colombia X Raid
163	(United States) Pablo Copetti	Yamaha	MX Devesa by Berta
164	(Argentina) Santiago Hansen	Yamaha	MX Devesa by Berta
168	(Chile) Italo Pedemonte	Yamaha	Enrico Racing Team
169	(Argentina) Tobias Juan Carrizo	Yamaha	M.E.D. Racing Team
170	(Poland) Arkadiusz Lindner	Can-Am	Lindner 91 Team
171	(Saudi Arabia) Abdulmajed Aakhulaifi	Yamaha	Bros KSA
174	(Spain) Toni Vingut	YAMAHA	Visit Sant Antoni - Ibiza
175	(Bolivia) Leonardo Martinez	Can-Am	Team Can Am Martinez
176	(Lithuania) Laisvydas Kancius	Yamaha	Story Racing S.R.O.
177	(Bolivia) Suany Martinez	Can-Am	Team an Am Martinez

Entry list — Cars

Note
– The "Dakar Legends" - competitors that participated in 10 or more Dakar events.
– The first time starters - "rookies".
– Competitors that were not able to start the race.

No.	Driver	Co-driver	Vehicle	Team	Class
300	(Spain) Carlos Sainz	(Spain) Lucas Cruz	Mini John Cooper Works Buggy	X-raid Mini JCW Team	T1.4
301	(Qatar) Nasser Al-Attiyah	(France) Matthieu Baumel	Toyota Gazoo Racing Hilux	Toyota Gazoo Racing	T1.1
302	(France) Stéphane Peterhansel	(France) Edouard Boulanger	Mini John Cooper Works Buggy	X-raid Mini JCW Team	T1.4
303	(Saudi Arabia) Yazeed Al Rajhi	(Germany) Dirk von Zitzewitz	Toyota Hilux Overdrive	Overdrive Toyota	T1.1
304	(South Africa) Giniel De Villiers	(Spain) Alex Haro Bravo	Toyota Gazoo Racing Hilux	Toyota Gazoo Racing	T1.1
305	(France) Sébastien Loeb	(Monaco) Daniel Elena	Prodrive BRX Hunter	Bahrain Raid Extreme	T1.1
306	(Netherlands) Bernhard ten Brinke	(Belgium) Tom Colsoul	Toyota Hilux Overdrive	Overdrive Toyota	T1.1
307	(Poland) Jakub Przygoński	(Germany) Timo Gottschalk	Toyota Hilux Overdrive	Overdrive Toyota	T1.1
308	(France) Mathieu Serradori	(Belgium) Fabian Lurquin	Century CR6	SRT Racing	T1.3
309	(Argentina) Orlando Terranova	(Argentina) Bernardo Graue	Mini John Cooper Works Rally	X-raid Team	T1.4
310	(United Arab Emirates) Sheikh Khalid Al Qassimi	(France) Xavier Panseri	Peugeot 3008 DKR	Abu Dhabi Racing	T1.4
311	(Spain) Nani Roma	(France) Alexandre Winocq	Prodrive BRX Hunter	Bahrain Raid Extreme	T1.1
312	(Czech Republic) Martin Prokop	(Czech Republic) Viktor Chytka	Ford Raptor RS Cross Country	Orlen Benzina Team	T1.1
313	(Netherlands) Erik van Loon	(France) Sébastien Delaunay	Toyota Hilux Overdrive	Overdrive Toyota	T1.1
314	(France) Cyril Despres	(Switzerland) Mike Horn	Peugeot 3008 DKR	Abu Dhabi Racing	T1.4
315	(France) Romain Dumas	(France) Gilles De Turckheim	Rebellion DXX	REBELLION MOTORS	T1.3
316	(Saudi Arabia) Yasir Seaidan	(Russia) Alexey Kuzmich	Century CR6	SRT Racing	T1.2
317	(Russia) Vladimir Vasilyev	(Ukraine) Dmytro Tsyro	Mini John Cooper Works Rally	X-RAID MINI JCW RALLY TEAM	T1.2
318	(China) Wei Han	(China) Min Liao	SMG Hanwei Motorsport	Quzhou Motorsport City Team	T1.3
319	(France) Jérôme Pélichet	(France) Pascal Larroque	MD Rallye Sport Optimus	Raidlynx	T1.3
320	(Lithuania) Benediktas Vanagas	(Portugal) Filipe Palmeiro	Toyota Gazoo Racing Hilux	Inbank Toyota Gazoo Racing Baltics	T1.1
321	(France) Dominique Housieaux	(France) Simon Vitse	MD Rallye Sport Optimus	MD Rallye Sport	T1.3
322	(France) Ronan Chabot	(France) Gilles Pillot	Toyota Hilux Overdrive	Overdrive Toyota	T1.1
323	(Russia) Denis Krotov	(Latvia) Oleg Uparenko	Mini John Cooper Works Rally	MSK Rally Team	T1.2
325	(Lithuania) Vaidotas Žala	(Portugal) Paulo Fiúza	Mini All4 Racing	Agrorodeo	T1.2
326	(France) Christian Lavieille	(France) Jean-Pierre Garcin	MD Rallye Sport Optimus	MD Rallye Sport	T1.3
327	(Spain) Isidre Esteve Pujol	(Spain) Txema Villalobos	Toyota Hilux Overdrive	Repsol Rally Team	T1.1
328	(Czech Republic) Miroslav Zapletal	(Slovakia) Marek Sýkora	Ford F150 Evo	Offroadsport	T1.1
329	(Lithuania) Antanas Juknevičius	(Lithuania) Darius Vaičiulis	Toyota Hilux	Kreda	T1.1
330	(South Africa) Shameer Variawa	(South Africa) Dennis Murphy	Toyota Gazoo Racing Hilux	Toyota Gazoo South Africa	T1.1
331	(Russia) Victor Khoroshavsev	(Russia) Anton Nikolaev	Mini John Cooper Works Rally	X-raid Team	T1.1
332	(South Africa) Henk Lategan	(South Africa) Brett Cummings	Toyota Gazoo Racing Hilux	Toyota Gazoo Racing	T1.1
333	(South Africa) Mark Corbett	(South Africa) Rodney Burke	Century CR6	Century Racing	T1.3
334	(Portugal) Ricardo Porem	(Portugal) Jorge Monteiro_	Borgward BX7 Evo	Borgward Rally Team	T1.1
335	(Brazil) Guilherme Spinelli	(Brazil) Youssef Haddad	Mini All4 Racing	X-raid Team	T1.1
336	(France) Jean Pierre Strugo	(France) François Borsotto	Peugeot 2008 DKR	PH-Sport	T1.4
337	(Argentina) Juan Cruz Yacopini	(Argentina) Alejandro Miguel Yacopini	Toyota Hilux Overdrive	Overdrive Toyota	T1.1
338	(Czech Republic) Tomáš Ouředníček	(Czech Republic) David Křípal	Toyota Hilux	Ultimate Dakar	T1.1
339	(South Africa) Brian Baragwanath	(South Africa) Taye Perry	Century CR6	Century Racing	T1.3
340	(Japan) Akira Miura	(France) Laurent Lichtleuchter	Toyota Land Cruiser VDJ200	Toyota Auto Body	T2.2
341	(France) Michael Pisano	(France) Max Delfino	MD Rallye Sport Optimus	MD Rallye Sport	T1.3
342	(Lithuania) Gintas Petrus	(Portugal) José Marques	MD Rallye Sport Optimus Evo3	Petrus Kombucha Team	T1.3
343	(China) Yangui Liu	(China) Hongyu Pan	BAIC BJ40	BAIC ORV	T1.1
344	(France) Philippe Boutron	(France) Mayeul Barbet	Sodicars BV2	Sodicars Racing	T1.3
345	(France) Ronald Basso	(France) Jean Michel Polato	Toyota Land Cruiser VDJ200	Toyota Auto Body	T2.2
346	(United Arab Emirates) Khalid Aljafla	(United Arab Emirates) Ali Mirza	Toyota Hilux	Khalid Aljafla	T1.1
347	(Netherlands) Tim Coronel	(Netherlands) Tom Coronel	Jefferies Dakar Rally	Maxxis Dakar Team Powered by Eurol	T1.1
348	(Belgium) Alexandre Leroy	(France) Nicolas Delangue	Century CR6	SRT Racing	T1.3
349	(Spain) Manuel Plaza Pérez	(Spain) Monica Plaza	Sodicars BV2	Sodicars Racing	T1.3
350	(France) Herve Toscano	(France) Pascal Gambillon	Renault Sadev Megane	Team SSP	T1.1
351	(Switzerland) Alexandre Pesci	(Switzerland) Stephan Kuhni	Rebellion DXX	Rebellion Motors	T1.3
352	(China) Guoyu Zhang	(China) He Sha	BAIC BJ40	BAIC ORV	T1.1
353	(Hungary) Balazs Szalay	(Hungary) Laszlo Bunkoczi	Opel Grandland X	Opel Dakar Team	T1.1
355	(Saudi Arabia) Alabdalali Saleh	(Saudi Arabia) Mohammed Alnaim	Hummer H3	Saleh	T1.1
356	(Lithuania) Edvinas Juškauskas	(Lithuania) Aisvydas Paliukėnas	Toyota Hilux	Heston Airlines Team Pitlane	T1.1
357	(Russia) Alexey Titov	(Russia) Dmitry Pavlov	Ford F150 Evo	Offoradsport	T1.1
358	(Brazil) Marcelo Tiglia Gastaldi	(Brazil) Lourival Roldan	Century CR6	Century Racing	T1.3
359	(Saudi Arabia) Abdulaziz Alyaeesh	(Saudi Arabia) Faisal Mohammed Ftyh	Isuzu D-Max	Naizk	T2.2
360	(Saudi Arabia) Mohamad Altwijri	(Saudi Arabia) Waleed Altoaigri	Toyota Land Cruiser	Altuwaijri Racing Team	T1.1
361	(China) Binglong Lu	(China) Wenke Ma	BAIC BJ40	BAIC ORV	T1.1
363	(Spain) Borja Rodriguez	(Spain) Ruben Rodriguez	Toyota Land Cruiser	FN Speed - Automotor 4X4	T1.2
364	(Belgium) Erwin Imschoot	(Belgium) Olivier Imschoot	MD Rallye Sport Optimus	MD Rallye Sport	T1.3
365	(France) Hugues Moilet	(France) Antoine Galland	Fouquet Chevrolet FC2	Off Road Concept	T1.3
366	(Spain) Miguel Bravo	(Spain) Mariano Banderas	Toyota Land Cruiser	FN Speed - Urano 4X4	T2.C
367	(Belarus) Andrei Halabarodzka	(Belarus) Andrei Rudnitski	Toyota Hilux	Team Pitlane	T1.1
368	(Spain) Joan Font	(Spain) Sergi Brugue	Toyota Land Cruiser	FN Speed Team	TAS
369	(France) Marco Piana	(Italy) David Giovanetti	Toyota Land Cruiser	Xtremeplus Polaris Factory Team	TAS
373	(France) Roger Audas	(France) Franck Maldonado	MD Rallye Sport Springbok Buggy	Sodicars Racing	T1.3

Entry list — SSV/UTV

Note
– The "Dakar Legends" - competitors that participated in 10 or more Dakar events.
– The first time starters - "rookies".
– Late entries.
– Competitors that were not able to start the race.

No.	Driver	Co-driver	Vehicle	Team	Class
380	(United Kingdom) Kris Meeke	(Netherlands) Wouter Rosegaar	PH-Sport	PH-Sport	T3
381	(United States) Mitch Guthrie	(Norway) Ola Fløene	OT3	Red Bull Off-Road Team USA	T3
383	(United States) Seth Quintero	(Germany) Dennis Zenz	OT3	Red Bull Off-Road Team USA	T3
384	(France) Jean Remy Bergounhe	(France) Jean Brucy	PH-Sport	PH-Sport	T3
385	(Sweden) Mattias Ekström	(Sweden) Emil Bergkvist	Yamaha YXZ1000R	Yamaha Powered by X-Raid Team	T3.1
386	(United Arab Emirates) Mansour Al Helei	(United Kingdom) Michael Orr	PH-Sport	Abu Dhabi Racing	T3
387	(Spain) Cristina Gutierrez Herrero	(France) Francois Cazalet	OT3 01	Red Bull Off-Road Team USA	T3.1
388	(France) Jean Pascal Besson	(France) Patrice Roissac	Pinch Racing	Rally Raid Concept	T3
390	(Portugal) Rui Miguel Costa Carneiro	(Portugal) Filipe Serra	MMP	MMP	T3
391	(Italy) Camelia Liparoti	(Germany) Annett Fischer	Yamaha X-Raid	Yamaha Racing Rally Supported Team	T3
392	(France) Philippe Pinchedez	(France) Vincent Ferri	Pinch Racing	Pinch Racing	T3
393	(France) Lionel Baud	(France) Loic Minaudier	PH-SPORT	PH-SPORT	T3
394	(France) Geoffrey Moreau	(France) Henri Moreau	MMP	MMP	T3
396	(Czech Republic) Tomáš Enge	(Czech Republic) Vlastimil Tosenovsky	Can-Am	Buggyra Zero Mileage Racing	T3.1
397	(France) Jean-Luc Pisson	(France) Valentin Sarreaud	PH-Sport	JLT Racing	T3
398	(Spain) Pablo Olivas	(Spain) Raul Ortiz	Can-Am	FN Speed - Automotor 4X4	T3
399	(Czech Republic) Josef Macháček	(Czech Republic) Pavel Vyoral	Can-Am	Buggyra Zero Mileage Racing	T3
400	(Russia) Sergei Kariakin	(Russia) Anton Vlasiuk	Can	Snag Racing Team	T4
401	(Chile) Francisco Lopez Contardo	(Chile) Juan Pablo Latrach Vinagre	Can-Am	South Racing Can-Am	T4
403	(Spain) Jose Antonio Hinojo Lopez	(Spain) Diego Ortega Gil	Can-Am	Hibor Raid	T4
404	(Brazil) Reinaldo Varela	(Brazil) Maykel Justo	Can-Am	Monster Energy Can-Am	T4
405	(Spain) Gerard Farrés Güell	(Spain) Armand Monleon	Can-Am	Monster Energy Can-Am	T4
406	(Poland) Aron Domżała	(Poland) Maciej Marton	Can-Am	Monster Energy Can-Am	T4
408	(United States) Austin Jones	(Brazil) Gustavo Gugelmin	Can-Am	Monster Energy Can-Am	T4
409	(United States) Kristen Matlock	(United States) Max Eddy Jr.	Polaris	Polaris RZR Factory Racing	T4
410	(Spain) Santiago Navarro	(Spain) Marc Solà Terradellas	Can-Am	FN Speed Team	T4
411	(France) Jeremie Warnia	(Switzerland) Steven Griener	Polaris	CST / Polaris France	T4
412	(Saudi Arabia) Saleh Alsaif	(Spain) Oriol Vidal Montijano	Can-Am	Black Horse	T4
414	(Spain) Juan Miguel Fidel Medero	(Spain) Victor Gonzalez	Can-Am	FN Speed Team	T4
416	(Netherlands) Kees Koolen	(Netherlands) Jurgen van den Goorbergh	Can-Am	South Racing Can-Am	T4
418	(France) Eric Abel	(France) Christian Manez	Can-Am	BBR/Mercier	T4
419	(Spain) Fernando Alvarez	(Spain) Antonio Gimeno García	Can-Am	South Racing Can-Am	T4
420	(United States) Wayne Matlock	(United States) Sam Hayes	POLARIS	Polaris RZR Factory Racing	T4
421	(Switzerland) Vincent Gonzalez	(France) Renaud Niveau	BRP	El Blanco Rosso Racing Team	T4
422	(Qatar) Nasser Khalifa Al Attiyah	(Italy) Paolo Ceci	Can-Am	South Racing Can-Am	T4
423	(Italy) Michele Cinotto	(Italy) Fulvio Zini	Polaris	Xtremeplus Polaris Factory Team	T4
424	(Poland) Michał Goczał	(Poland) Szymon Gospodarczyk	Can-Am	Energylandia Rally Team	T4
425	(United States) Craig Scanlon	(United States) Keith Redsrom	Polaris	Polaris RZR Factory Racing	T4
426	(United Kingdom) Graham Knight	(United Kingdom) David Watson	Polaris	Xtremeplus Polaris Factory Team	T4
427	(France) Christophe Cresp	(France) Serge Henninot	Can-Am	MMP	T4
428	(Ecuador) Sebastian Guayasamin	(Argentina) Ricardo Adrian Torlaschi	Polaris	Xtremeplus Polaris Factory Team	T4
430	(Poland) Marek Goczał	(Poland) Rafał Marton	Can-Am	Energylandia Rally Team	T4
431	(Qatar) Fahad Ahmed Alkuwari	(Qatar) Nasser Alkuwari	Yamaha	FN Speed	T4
432	(United Kingdom) Liam Griffin	(France) Stephane Duple	Polaris	Xtremeplus Polaris Factory Team	T4
433	(France) Fabrice Lardon	(France) Romain Souvignet	Can-Am	Team Casteu	T4
434	(Belgium) Danny Pearl	(Belgium) Charly Gotlib	Can-Am	FN Speed Team	T4
436	(France) Benoit Lepietre	(France) Aurelie Sifferlen	Can-Am	MYX Racing	T4
437	(Austria) Nicolas Brabeck-Letmathe	(France) Bruno Bony	Can-Am	Team Casteu	T4
438	(Spain) Ricardo Ramilo Suarez	(Spain) Xavier Blanco Garcia	Can-Am	Buggy Masters Team & Vehilsxtreme	T4
439	(France) Matthieu Margaillan	(France) Axelle Roux-Decima	Can-Am	Margaillan	T4
440	(France) Patrick Becquart	(France) Romain Becquart	Can-Am	BBR/Mercier	T4
441	(Italy) Ferdinando Brachetti Peretti	(Spain) Rafael Tornabell Cordoba	Polaris	Xtremeplus Polaris Factory Team	T4
442	(Portugal) Lourenço Rosa	(Portugal) Joaquim Dias	Can-Am	South Racing Can-Am	T4
443	(Spain) Gael Queralt	(Argentina) Juan Silva	Can-Am	FN Speed Team	T4
444	(France) Frederic Chesneau	(France) Stephane Chesneau	Can-Am	FS 21	T4
445	(Saudi Arabia) Saeed Almouri	(Uruguay) Sergio Lafuente	Can-Am	South Racing Can-Am	T4
446	(Lebanon) Michel Fadel	(United Kingdom) Craig Tyson	Polaris	Panda Cars Racing	T4
447	(Spain) Emilio Ferrando	(Spain) Aragon Illana Eduardo	Can-Am	Graphenano Racing Team	T4
449	(Spain) Santiago Prado Losada	(Spain) Alvaro Rodriguez Sans	Yamaha	Van Orton	T4
450	(Colombia) Javier Velez	(Colombia) Mateo Moreno Kristiansen	Can-Am	FN Speed Team	T4
452	(Romania) Claudiu Barbu	(Romania) Marius Lupu	POLARIS	Transcarpatic Rally Team	T4
454	(Netherlands) Gert-Jan Van Der Valk	(Netherlands) Branco De Lange	Can-Am	Team Valk Events	T4

Entry list — Trucks

Note
– The "Dakar Legends" - competitors that participated in 10 or more Dakar events.
– The first time starters - "rookies".
– Late entries.
– Competitors that were not able to start the race.

No.	Driver	Co-driver	Technician	Vehicle	Team	Class
500	(Russia) Andrey Karginov	(Russia) Andrey Mokeev	(Russia) Igor Leonov	Kamaz 43509	Kamaz-Master	T5.2
501	(Russia) Anton Shibalov	(Russia) Dmitrii Nikitin	(Russia) Ivan Tatarinov	Kamaz 43509	Kamaz-Master	T5.2
502	(Belarus) Siarhei Viazovich	(Belarus) Pavel Haranin	(Belarus) Anton Zaparoshchanka	MAZ 6440RR	MAZ-Sportauto	T5.2
503	(Czech Republic) Martin Macík	(Czech Republic) František Tomášek	(Czech Republic) David Švanda	Iveco PowerStar	Big Shcok Racing	T5.2
504	(Czech Republic) Aleš Loprais	(Czech Republic) Petr Pokora	(United Arab Emirates) Khalid Alkendi	Praga V45 DKR	Instaforex Loprais Praga	T5.2
505	(Belarus) Aliaksei Vishneuski	(Belarus) Maksim Novikau	(Belarus) Siarhei Sachuk	MAZ 6440RR	MAZ-Sportauto	T5.2
506	(Netherlands) Martin van den Brink	(Netherlands) Wouter De Graaf	(Czech Republic) Daniel Kozlovský	Renault C460	Trucks Mammoet Rallysport	T5.2
507	(Russia) Dmitry Sotnikov	(Russia) Ruslan Akhmadeev	(Russia) Ilgiz Akhmetzianov	Kamaz 43509	Kamaz-Master	T5.2
508	(Japan) Teruhito Sugawara	(Japan) Hirokazu Somemiya	(Japan) Yuji Mochizuki	Hino 500	Hino Team Sugawara	T5.2
509	(Russia) Airat Mardeev	(Russia) Dmitriy Svistunov	(Russia) Akhmet Galiautdinov	Kamaz 43509	Kamaz-Master	T5.2
511	(Netherlands) Gert Huzink	(Netherlands) Rob Buursen	(Netherlands) Martin Roesink	Renault C460 Hybrid Edition	Riwald Dakar Team	T5.2
514	(Czech Republic) Martin Šoltys	(Czech Republic) David Schovánek	(Czech Republic) Tomáš Šikola	Tatra Phoenix	Tatra Buggyra Racing	T5.2
515	(Netherlands) Pascal De Baar	(Belgium) Jan Van Der Vaet	(Netherlands) Stefan Slootjes	Renault K520	Riwald Dakar Team	T5.2
517	(Chile) Ignacio Casale	(Chile) Alvaro León	(Czech Republic) David Hoffmann	Tatra Phoenix	Tatra Buggyra Racing	T5.2
518	(Czech Republic) Jaroslav Valtr	(Czech Republic) Radim Kaplánek	(Czech Republic) Jaroslav Valtr Jr	Iveco PowerStar	Valtr Racing Team	T5.2
519	(Netherlands) Maurik Van Den Heuvel	(Netherlands) Wilko Van Oort	(Netherlands) Martijn Van Rooij	International Scania LoneStar	Dakarspeed	T5.2
520	(Czech Republic) Jan Tománek	(Czech Republic) Tomáš Kašpárek	(Czech Republic) Jiří Stross	Tatra T815-2	Instaforex Loprais Praga	T5.2
521	(Spain) Alberto Herrero	(Spain) Juan Carlos Macho Del Olmo	(Portugal) Nuno Jorge Silva Fojo	Man	Polaris RZR Factory	T5.1
522	(Germany) Mathias Behringer	(Germany) Stefan Henken	(Germany) Robert Striebe	MAN SX	South Racing	T5.2
523	(Netherlands) William De Groot	(Netherlands) Marcel Snijders	(Netherlands) Bart Gloudemans	DAF FT XF105	Team de Groot	T5.2
524	(Spain) Javier Jacoste	(Spain) Jordi Celma Obiols	(Spain) José Luis Rosa Olivera	MAN TGA 11	Team Boucou	T5.3
525	(Netherlands) Richard De Groot	(Netherlands) Jan Hulsebosch	(Netherlands) Markus J Laan	Iveco Magirus 4x4 DRNL	Firemen Dakar Team	T5.2
526	(Spain) Jordi Juvanteny	(Spain) José Luis Criado		MAN DGA 26.480	KH7 Epsilon	T5.1
527	(Italy) Paolo Calabria	(Italy) Loris Calubini	(Italy) Mauro Grezzini	MAN AG 4x4	Orobica Raid	T5.2
528	(Netherlands) Pieter Alexander Koot	(Netherlands) Arjen Remco Aangeenbrug	(Netherlands) Wesley Van Groningen	DAF FAV 75	Dust Warriors	T5.2
529	(Netherlands) Mitchel Van Den Brink	(Netherlands) Rijk Mouw	(Netherlands) Wilfred Schuurman	Volvo FMX	Mammoet Rallysport	T5.2
530	(Hungary) Károly Fazekas	(Hungary) Albert Péter Horn	(Hungary) Péter Csákány	Scania P 4x4	Fazekas Motorsport Racing	T5.2
532	(Spain) Jordi Esteve Oro	(Spain) Rafael Tibau Maynou	(Spain) Arnald Bastida	MAN TGA 18.480	Bahrain Raid Xtreme	T5.3
535	(Italy) Giulio Verzeletti	(Italy) Giuseppe Fortuna	(Italy) Marino Mutti	Mercedes Unimog U400	Orobica Raid	T5.2
536	(United States) Aviv Kadshai	(United States) Izhar Armony	(United States) Maoz Vilder	DAF CF85MX510	Team CRV	T5.2
537	(Netherlands) William Jacobus Joha Van Groningen	(Netherlands) Cornelis Marten De Wit	(Netherlands) Jaco Van Groningen	Iveco NG3/BA 03	Dust Warriors	T5.2
538	(Czech Republic) Tomáš Tomeček	(Czech Republic) Ladislav Lála	(Germany) Philipp Rettig	Tatra 815-2T0R45	South Racing	T5.3
539	(Hungary) Zsolt Darazsi	(France) Thierry Pacquelet	(France) Geoffrey Thalgott	MAN TGA	PH-Sport	T5.3
540	(Saudi Arabia) Ibrahm Almuhna	(Saudi Arabia) Osama Alsanad	(Saudi Arabia) Raed Abo Theeb	Mercedes Unimog	Ibrahim Almuhna	T5.1
541	(Belgium) Dave Berghmans	(United Kingdom) Robert Nicholas Warmisham	(Belgium) Bob Geens	Iveco Trakker	Overdrive Toyota	T5.3
542	(Portugal) Jose Martins	(France) Jean-Francois Cazeres	(France) Jerome Naquart	Iveco Trakker	Team Boucou	T5.3
543	(Algeria) Ahmed Benbekhti	(France) Bruno Seillet	(France) Mickael Fauvel	MAN TGS	Sta Competition	T5.3
544	(France) Richard Gonzalez	(France) Marc Plaindoux	(France) Patrick Prot	DAF TSB	Sodicars Racing	T5.3
545	(Saudi Arabia) Tariq Al-Rammah	(Algeria) Samir Benbekhti	(France) Serge Lambert	MAN	Tariq Al-Rammah	T5.3
546	(Germany) Michael Baumann	(Germany) Philipp Beier	(Spain) Rafael Tibau	MAN TGA 26480	X-Raid Team	T5.3
547	(Andorra) Jordi Ginesta	(France) Marc Dardaillon	(France) Loris Blot	MAN TGA	Team Boucou	T5.3
548	(Spain) Francesc Salisi	(Spain) Alex Aguirregaviria	(Spain) Pau Navarro	Mercedes 1844 AK 4x4	FN SPEED - EPSILON TEAM	T5.3
549	(France) Sylvain Besnard	(France) Sylvain Laliche	(France) Tom Besnard	MAN TGA 114	Team SSP	T5.3
550	(Czech Republic) Dušan Randýsek	(France) Francois Regnier	(France) Julien Martin	MAN TGA H	PH-Sport	T5.3
551	(France) Thomas Robineau	(Andorra) David Lamelas Morell		DAF CF75	Team Boucou	

Entry list — Classics

Note
– The "Dakar Legends" - competitors that participated in 10 or more Dakar events.
– The first time starters - "rookies".
– Competitors that were not able to start the race.

No.	Driver	Co-driver	Technician	Vehicle	Team
200	(Spain) Ignacio Corcuera	(Spain) Laurent Iker San Vicente	No technician	Volkswagen Iltis	Equipo Euskadi 4X4
201	(Belgium) Emmanuel Eggermont	(Belgium) Edouard De Braekeleer	No technician	Volkswagen Apal	Racing Wings
202	(United States) Amy Lerner	(Belgium) Sara Carmen Bossaert	No technician	Porsche 911 SC	Al Rally
204	(Belgium) Benoit Callewaert	(Belgium) Ghislain Morel	No technician	Volkswagen Baja	Racing Wings
205	(France) Christian Bigou	TBA	No technician		Peugeot Team Bimoto
206	(Czech Republic) Ondřej Klymčiw	(Czech Republic) Petr Vlček	No technician	Škoda LR130	Klymciw Racing
207	(Italy) Roberto Camporese	(Italy) Umberto Fiori	No technician	Peugeot 504 Pickup	Camporese Fiori
209	(Spain) Juan Donatiu	(Spain) Pere Serrat Puig	No technician	Mitsubishi Montero	Doria Racing
210	(Spain) Antonio Gutierrez	(Spain) Luis Heras Rodriguez	No technician	Mercedes G-320	Rumbo Zero
211	(Spain) Carlos Vento Sanchez	(Spain) Juan Carlos Ramirez Moure	No technician	Mercedes G-320	Rumbo Zero
212	(France) Stephan Lamarre	(France) Benjamin Laroche	No technician	Mitsubishi Pajero	Racing Wings
213	(France) Frédéric Verdaguer	(France) Julie Verdaguer	No technician	Sunhill Buggy	Team Sunhill
214	(Spain) Andres Vidal	(Spain) Pere Maimi Codina	No technician	Land Rover Range Rover	Classics Competicio
215	(Spain) Juan Llopis	(Spain) Francesc Xavier Guillem Coromines	No technician	Land Rover Range Rover	Classics Competicio
216	(Spain) Kilian Revuelta	(Spain) Oscar Sanchez Hernandez	No technician	Toyota Land Cruiser	Naturhouse
217	(Spain) Pere Barrios Sturlese	(Spain) Maria Helena Tarruell Tibau	No technician	Toyota Land Cruiser HDJ80	TH-Trucks
219	(France) Maxime Lacarrau	(France) Pierre Louis Quemin	No technician	Toyota Proto KDJ95	Lacarrau/Quemin
220	(Spain) Francisco J Benavente	(Spain) Rafael Benavente Del Rio	No technician	Nissan Terrano	Recinsa Sport
221	(Saudi Arabia) Homood Majed	TBA	No technician	Nissan	Jubbah Knights
223	(Spain) Alberto Garcia Merino	(Spain) Julian Jose Garcia Merino	No technician	Toyota Land Cruiser HDJ80	Merinoteam
225	(Italy) Luciano Carcheri	(Italy) Roberto Musi	No technician	Nissan Patrol	Carcheri Luciano
227	(Spain) Juan Roura Iglesias	(Andorra) Oscar Gonçalves Gomez	No technician	Toyota Land Cruiser HDJ80	Roura Lighting Team
229	(France) Marc Douton	(France) Emilien Etienne	No technician	Sunhill Buggy	Team Sunhill
251	(Belgium) Didier Monseu	(Belgium) Niels Lescot	(Belgium) Edouard Fraipont	MAN 41460	Bel Edouard Fraipont Man Racing Wings
252	(Spain) Miquel Angel Boet	(Spain) Alexandre Rabell	No technician	Mercedes Unimog	Classics Competicio
253	(France) Lilian Harichoury	(France) Laurent Correia	(France) Luc Fertin	Renault Trucks 420DCI	FRA Laurent Correia Renault Trucks Team Boucou

A number of participants were affected by the on-going COVID-19 pandemic. Before participants travelled to Saudi Arabia on 26-27 of December, Nani Roma co-driver Daniel Oliveras Carreras had to be replaced by Alexandre Winocq, Gintas Petrus co-driver Povilas Valaitis replaced by José Marques, Denis Krotov co-driver Konstantin Zhiltsov replaced by Oleg Uparenko, Ricardo Porem co-driver Manuel Porem replaced by Jorge Monteiro. Vaidotas Žala two main technicians contracted the coronavirus, numerous other teams were forced to make last-minute changes to replace team members that were tested positive for coronavirus. Trucks #523 and #526 withdrew after Francesc Ester and Jorge Ballbe contracted coronavirus. After arrival in Jeddah, all participants had to take two coronavirus tests two days apart. #56 Giordano Pacheco and #357 Alexey Titov tests came back positive, repeat tests were also positive, and they were forced to withdraw from the race. #23 Ivan Jakeš second test came back positive. They all had to self-isolate for 7 days before being allowed to travel home.

== Stages ==
Stage	Date		Start	Finish	Total / Special
Prologue	Saturday	January 2, 2021	Jeddah	Jeddah	11 km / 11 km
Stage 1	Sunday	January 3, 2021	Jeddah	Bisha	622 km / 277 km
Stage 2	Monday	January 4, 2021	Bisha	Wadi ad-Dawasir	685 km / 457 km
Stage 3	Tuesday	January 5, 2021	Wadi ad-Dawasir	Wadi ad-Dawasir	630 km / 403 km
Stage 4	Wednesday	January 6, 2021	Wadi ad-Dawasir	Riyadh	813 km / 337 km
Stage 5	Thursday	January 7, 2021	Riyadh	Buraydah	625 km / 419 km
Stage 6	Friday	January 8, 2021	Buraydah	Ha'il	655 km / 485 km
Rest day	Saturday	January 9, 2021	Ha'il		—N/a
Stage 7 (marathon)	Sunday	January 10, 2021	Ha'il	Sakaka	737 km / 471 km
Stage 8	Monday	January 11, 2021	Sakaka	Neom	709 km / 375 km
Stage 9	Tuesday	January 12, 2021	Neom	Neom	579 km / 465 km
Stage 10	Wednesday	January 13, 2021	Neom	AlUla	583 km / 342 km
Stage 11	Thursday	January 14, 2021	AlUla	Yanbu	557 km / 511 km
Stage 12	Friday	January 15, 2021	Yanbu	Jeddah	452 km / 225 km

Stage 5 proved to be very difficult for significant number of competitors who finished it very late. Therefore, organizers decided to delay the start of stage 6 by 1 hour 30 minutes and shorten the special on stage 6 by 100 kilometres.

Stage 11 has been shortened by 50 km due to weather conditions.

== Stage winners ==
Stage	Bikes	Quads	Cars	Light Proto (T3)	UTV (T4)	Trucks	Classics
Prologue	(United States) Ricky Brabec	(France) Alexandre Giroud	(Qatar) Nasser Al-Attiyah	(United Kingdom) Kris Meeke	(United States) Austin Jones	(Belarus) Siarhei Viazovich	Did not participate
Stage 1	(Australia) Toby Price	(France) Alexandre Giroud	(Spain) Carlos Sainz	(Spain) Cristina Gutiérrez Herrero	(United States) Austin Jones	(Russia) Dmitry Sotnikov	(France) Marc Douton
Stage 2	(Spain) Joan Barreda Bort	(United States) Pablo Copetti	(Qatar) Nasser Al-Attiyah	(United States) Seth Quintero	(Saudi Arabia) Saleh Alsaif	(Russia) Dmitry Sotnikov	(France) Marc Douton
Stage 3	(Australia) Toby Price	(Argentina) Nicolás Cavigliasso	(Qatar) Nasser Al-Attiyah	(United States) Seth Quintero	(Chile) Francisco López Contardo	(Belarus) Siarhei Viazovich	(France) Marc Douton
Stage 4	(Spain) Joan Barreda Bort	(Argentina) Manuel Andújar	(Qatar) Nasser Al-Attiyah	(United Kingdom) Kris Meeke	(Poland) Aron Domżała	(Russia) Dmitry Sotnikov	(France) Marc Douton
Stage 5	(Argentina) Kevin Benavides	(Argentina) Nicolás Cavigliasso	(South Africa) Giniel de Villiers	(United States) Seth Quintero	(Chile) Francisco López Contardo	(Russia) Dmitry Sotnikov	(France) Marc Douton
Stage 6	(Spain) Joan Barreda Bort	(France) Alexandre Giroud	(Spain) Carlos Sainz	(United States) Seth Quintero	(Qatar) Khalifa Al-Attiyah	(Russia) Airat Mardeev	(Czech Republic) Ondřej Klymčiw
Stage 7 (marathon)	(United States) Ricky Brabec	(Argentina) Manuel Andújar	(Saudi Arabia) Yazeed Al-Rajhi	(Spain) Cristina Gutiérrez Herrero	(Chile) Francisco López Contardo	(Russia) Dmitry Sotnikov	(France) Marc Douton
Stage 8	(Chile) José Ignacio Cornejo	(France) Alexandre Giroud	(Qatar) Nasser Al-Attiyah	(United States) Seth Quintero	(Chile) Francisco López Contardo	(Russia) Anton Shibalov	(Spain) Kilian Revuelta
Stage 9	(Argentina) Kevin Benavides	(Chile) Giovanni Enrico	(France) Stéphane Peterhansel	(Spain) Cristina Gutiérrez Herrero	(Chile) Francisco López Contardo	(Czech Republic) Martin Macík	(Spain) Kilian Revuelta
Stage 10	(United States) Ricky Brabec	(United States) Pablo Copetti	(Saudi Arabia) Yazeed Al-Rajhi	(United Kingdom) Kris Meeke	(Russia) Sergei Kariakin	(Czech Republic) Martin Macík	(France) Lilian Harichoury
Stage 11	(United Kingdom) Sam Sunderland	(Chile) Giovanni Enrico	(Qatar) Nasser Al-Attiyah	(United States) Seth Quintero	(Chile) Francisco López Contardo	(Russia) Anton Shibalov	(France) Stephan Lamarre
Stage 12	(United States) Ricky Brabec	(United States) Pablo Copetti	(Spain) Carlos Sainz	(United Kingdom) Kris Meeke	(Brazil) Reinaldo Varela	(Czech Republic) Martin Macík	(Spain) Antonio Gutierrez
Rally winners	(Argentina) Kevin Benavides	(Argentina) Manuel Andújar	(France) Stéphane Peterhansel	(Czech Republic) Josef Macháček	(Chile) Francisco López Contardo	(Russia) Dmitry Sotnikov	(France) Marc Douton

== Stage results ==
=== Bikes ===
	Stage result					General classification				
Stage	Pos	Competitor	Make	Time	Gap	Pos	Competitor	Make	Time	Gap
Prologue	1	(United States) Ricky Brabec	Honda	00:06:01		1	(United States) Ricky Brabec	Honda	00:06:01	
Prologue	2	(Spain) Joan Barreda Bort	Honda	00:06:07	00:00:06	2	(Spain) Joan Barreda Bort	Honda	00:06:07	00:00:06
Prologue	3	(Australia) Daniel Sanders	KTM	00:06:14	00:00:13	3	(Australia) Daniel Sanders	KTM	00:06:14	00:00:13
1	1	(Australia) Toby Price	KTM	03:17:49		1	(Australia) Toby Price	KTM	03:43:21	
1	2	(Argentina) Kevin Benavides	Honda	03:18:24	00:00:35	2	(Argentina) Kevin Benavides	Honda	03:43:48	00:00:27
1	3	(Austria) Matthias Walkner	KTM	03:18:24	00:00:35	3	(Austria) Matthias Walkner	KTM	03:44:36	00:01:15
2	1	(Spain) Joan Barreda Bort	Honda	04:17:56		1	(Spain) Joan Barreda Bort	Honda	08:15:38	
2	2	(United States) Ricky Brabec	Honda	04:21:51	00:03:55	2	(United States) Ricky Brabec	Honda	08:22:01	00:06:23
2	3	(Chile) Pablo Quintanilla	Husqvarna	04:23:58	00:06:02	3	(Botswana) Ross Branch	Yamaha	08:22:15	00:06:37
3	1	(Australia) Toby Price	KTM	03:33:23		1	(United States) Skyler Howes	KTM	12:04:48	
3	2	(Argentina) Kevin Benavides	Honda	03:34:39	00:01:16	2	(Argentina) Kevin Benavides	Honda	12:05:21	00:00:33
3	3	(Austria) Matthias Walkner	KTM	03:35:59	00:02:36	3	(France) Xavier de Soultrait	Husqvarna	12:06:16	00:01:28
4	1	(Spain) Joan Barreda Bort	Honda	02:46:50		1	(France) Xavier de Soultrait	Husqvarna	15:00:25	
4	2	(Australia) Daniel Sanders	KTM	02:52:59	00:06:09	2	(Spain) Joan Barreda Bort	Honda	15:00:40	00:00:15
4	3	(Argentina) Luciano Benavides	Husqvarna	02:53:12	00:06:22	3	(Botswana) Ross Branch	Yamaha	15:05:49	00:05:24
5	1	(Argentina) Kevin Benavides	Honda	05:09:50		1	(Argentina) Kevin Benavides	Honda	20:15:39	
5	2	(Chile) José Ignacio Cornejo	Honda	05:10:50	00:01:00	2	(France) Xavier de Soultrait	Husqvarna	20:18:10	00:02:31
5	3	(Australia) Toby Price	KTM	05:11:10	00:01:20	3	(Chile) José Ignacio Cornejo	Honda	20:19:21	00:03:42
6	1	(Spain) Joan Barreda Bort	Honda	03:45:27		1	(Australia) Toby Price	KTM	24:08:43	
6	2	(Botswana) Ross Branch	Yamaha	03:45:40	00:00:13	2	(Argentina) Kevin Benavides	Honda	24:10:59	00:02:16
6	3	(Australia) Daniel Sanders	KTM	03:46:20	00:00:53	3	(Chile) José Ignacio Cornejo	Honda	24:11:40	00:02:57
7	1	(United States) Ricky Brabec	Honda	04:37:44		1	(Chile) José Ignacio Cornejo	Honda	28:51:31	
7	2	(Chile) José Ignacio Cornejo	Honda	04:39:51	00:02:07	2	(Australia) Toby Price	KTM	28:51:32	00:00:01
7	3	(United States) Skyler Howes	KTM	04:40:03	00:02:19	3	(United Kingdom) Sam Sunderland	KTM	28:53:42	00:02:11
8	1	(Chile) José Ignacio Cornejo	Honda	03:08:40		1	(Chile) José Ignacio Cornejo	Honda	32:00:11	
8	2	(Australia) Toby Price	KTM	03:09:45	00:01:05	2	(Australia) Toby Price	KTM	32:01:17	00:01:06
8	3	(United States) Ricky Brabec	Honda	03:11:30	00:02:50	3	(United Kingdom) Sam Sunderland	KTM	32:06:08	00:05:57
9	1	(Argentina) Kevin Benavides	Honda	04:49:15		1	(Chile) José Ignacio Cornejo	Honda	36:51:00	
9	2	(United States) Ricky Brabec	Honda	04:50:33	00:01:18	2	(Argentina) Kevin Benavides	Honda	37:02:24	00:11:24
9	3	(Chile) José Ignacio Cornejo	Honda	04:50:49	00:01:34	3	(United Kingdom) Sam Sunderland	KTM	37:05:34	00:14:34
10	1	(United States) Ricky Brabec	Honda	03:12:33		1	(Argentina) Kevin Benavides	Honda	40:20:08	
10	2	(Spain) Joan Barreda Bort	Honda	03:15:48	00:03:15	2	(United States) Ricky Brabec	Honda	40:20:59	00:00:51
10	3	(Argentina) Kevin Benavides	Honda	03:17:44	00:05:11	3	(United Kingdom) Sam Sunderland	KTM	40:30:44	00:10:36
11	1	(United Kingdom) Sam Sunderland	KTM	04:35:12		1	(Argentina) Kevin Benavides	Honda	45:01:44	
11	2	(Chile) Pablo Quintanilla	Husqvarna	04:37:52	00:02:40	2	(United Kingdom) Sam Sunderland	KTM	45:05:56	00:04:12
11	3	(Argentina) Kevin Benavides	Honda	04:41:36	00:06:24	3	(United States) Ricky Brabec	Honda	45:08:57	00:07:13
12	1	(United States) Ricky Brabec	Honda	02:17:02		1	(Argentina) Kevin Benavides	Honda	47:18:14	
12	2	(Argentina) Kevin Benavides	Honda	02:19:19	00:02:17	2	(United States) Ricky Brabec	Honda	47:23:10	00:04:56
12	3	(Austria) Matthias Walkner	KTM	02:21:15	00:04:13	3	(United Kingdom) Sam Sunderland	KTM	47:34:11	00:15:57

=== Quads ===
	Stage result					General classification				
Stage	Pos	Competitor	Make	Time	Gap	Pos	Competitor	Make	Time	Gap
Prologue	1	(France) Alexandre Giroud	Yamaha	00:07:35		1	(France) Alexandre Giroud	Yamaha	00:07:35	
Prologue	2	(Argentina) Manuel Andújar	Yamaha	00:07:36	00:00:01	2	(Argentina) Manuel Andújar	Yamaha	00:07:36	00:00:01
Prologue	3	(Poland) Kamil Wiśniewski	Yamaha	00:07:39	00:00:04	3	(Poland) Kamil Wiśniewski	Yamaha	00:07:39	00:00:04
1	1	(France) Alexandre Giroud	Yamaha	04:01:08		1	(France) Alexandre Giroud	Yamaha	04:31:28	
1	2	(Chile) Giovanni Enrico	Yamaha	04:04:04	00:02:56	2	(Chile) Giovanni Enrico	Yamaha	04:35:04	00:03:36
1	3	(United States) Pablo Copetti	Yamaha	04:05:54	00:04:46	3	(United States) Pablo Copetti	Yamaha	04:36:38	00:05:10
2	1	(United States) Pablo Copetti	Yamaha	05:34:50		1	(France) Alexandre Giroud	Yamaha	10:08:48	
2	2	(Chile) Giovanni Enrico	Yamaha	05:34:53	00:00:03	2	(Chile) Giovanni Enrico	Yamaha	10:09:57	00:01:09
2	3	(France) Alexandre Giroud	Yamaha	05:37:20	00:02:30	3	(United States) Pablo Copetti	Yamaha	10:11:28	00:02:40
3	1	(Argentina) Nicolás Cavigliasso	Yamaha	04:25:49		1	(Chile) Giovanni Enrico	Yamaha	14:36:46	
3	2	(Chile) Giovanni Enrico	Yamaha	04:26:49	00:01:00	2	(France) Alexandre Giroud	Yamaha	14:40:52	00:04:06
3	3	(Argentina) Manuel Andújar	Yamaha	04:29:57	00:04:08	3	(Argentina) Nicolás Cavigliasso	Yamaha	14:43:27	00:06:41
4	1	(Argentina) Manuel Andújar	Yamaha	03:29:13		1	(Argentina) Nicolás Cavigliasso	Yamaha	18:13:48	
4	2	(Argentina) Nicolás Cavigliasso	Yamaha	03:30:21	00:01:08	2	(France) Alexandre Giroud	Yamaha	18:13:57	00:00:09
4	3	(France) Alexandre Giroud	Yamaha	03:33:05	00:03:52	3	(Chile) Giovanni Enrico	Yamaha	18:21:21	00:07:33
5	1	(Argentina) Nicolás Cavigliasso	Yamaha	06:09:42		1	(Argentina) Nicolás Cavigliasso	Yamaha	24:23:30	
5	2	(Argentina) Manuel Andújar	Yamaha	06:11:23	00:01:41	2	(Argentina) Manuel Andújar	Yamaha	24:47:18	00:23:48
5	3	(Chile) Giovanni Enrico	Yamaha	06:53:55	00:44:13	3	(France) Alexandre Giroud	Yamaha	25:10:53	00:47:23
6	1	(France) Alexandre Giroud	Yamaha	04:50:24		1	(Argentina) Nicolás Cavigliasso	Yamaha	29:15:55	
6	2	(Chile) Giovanni Enrico	Yamaha	04:50:58	00:00:34	2	(Argentina) Manuel Andújar	Yamaha	29:49:13	00:33:18
6	3	(Argentina) Nicolás Cavigliasso	Yamaha	04:52:25	00:02:01	2	(France) Alexandre Giroud	Yamaha	30:01:17	00:45:22
7	1	(Argentina) Manuel Andújar	Yamaha	05:57:40		1	(Argentina) Manuel Andújar	Yamaha	35:46:53	
7	2	(Chile) Italo Pedemonte	Yamaha	06:00:45	00:03:05	2	(France) Alexandre Giroud	Yamaha	36:07:48	00:20:55
7	3	(France) Alexandre Giroud	Yamaha	06:06:31	00:08:51	3	(Chile) Giovanni Enrico	Yamaha	36:12:48	00:25:55
8	1	(France) Alexandre Giroud	Yamaha	04:20:40		1	(Argentina) Manuel Andújar	Yamaha	40:08:45	
8	2	(Argentina) Manuel Andújar	Yamaha	04:21:52	00:01:12	2	(France) Alexandre Giroud	Yamaha	40:28:28	00:19:43
8	3	(Chile) Giovanni Enrico	Yamaha	04:21:57	00:01:17	3	(Chile) Giovanni Enrico	Yamaha	40:34:45	00:26:00
9	1	(Chile) Giovanni Enrico	Yamaha	06:24:41		1	(Argentina) Manuel Andújar	Yamaha	46:35:11	
9	2	(France) Alexandre Giroud	Yamaha	06:26:11	00:01:30	2	(France) Alexandre Giroud	Yamaha	46:54:39	00:19:28
9	3	(Argentina) Manuel Andújar	Yamaha	06:26:26	00:01:45	3	(Chile) Giovanni Enrico	Yamaha	46:59:26	00:24:15
10	1	(Chile) Italo Pedemonte	Yamaha	04:19:07		1	(Argentina) Manuel Andújar	Yamaha	50:56:43	
10	2	(Argentina) Manuel Andújar	Yamaha	04:21:32	00:02:25	2	(France) Alexandre Giroud	Yamaha	51:17:43	00:21:00
10	3	(France) Alexandre Giroud	Yamaha	04:23:04	00:03:57	3	(Chile) Giovanni Enrico	Yamaha	51:23:47	00:27:04
11	1	(Chile) Giovanni Enrico	Yamaha	06:21:16		1	(Argentina) Manuel Andújar	Yamaha	57:19:11	
11	2	(Argentina) Manuel Andújar	Yamaha	06:22:28	00:01:12	2	(Chile) Giovanni Enrico	Yamaha	57:45:03	00:25:52
11	3	(United States) Pablo Copetti	Yamaha	06:24:34	00:03:18	3	(United States) Pablo Copetti	Yamaha	60:20:45	03:01:34
12	1	(United States) Pablo Copetti	Yamaha	03:11:30		1	(Argentina) Manuel Andújar	Yamaha	60:28:29	
12	2	(Argentina) Manuel Andújar	Yamaha	03:11:53	00:00:23	2	(Chile) Giovanni Enrico	Yamaha	61:02:13	00:33:44
12	3	(Poland) Kamil Wiśniewski	Yamaha	03:13:55	00:02:25	3	(United States) Pablo Copetti	Yamaha	63:29:27	03:00:58

=== Cars ===
	Stage result					General classification				
Stage	Pos	Competitor	Make	Time	Gap	Pos	Competitor	Make	Time	Gap
Prologue	1	(Qatar) Nasser Al-Attiyah	Toyota	00:05:48		1	(Qatar) Nasser Al-Attiyah	Toyota	00:05:48	
Prologue	2	(South Africa) Brian Baragwanath	Century	00:05:48	00:00:00	2	(South Africa) Brian Baragwanath	Century	00:05:48	00:00:00
Prologue	3	(Saudi Arabia) Yazeed Al-Rajhi	Toyota	00:05:56	00:00:08	3	(Saudi Arabia) Yazeed Al-Rajhi	Toyota	00:05:56	00:00:08
1	1	(Spain) Carlos Sainz	Mini	03:05:00		1	(Spain) Carlos Sainz	Mini	03:11:24	
1	2	(France) Stéphane Peterhansel	Mini	03:05:22	00:00:22	2	(France) Stéphane Peterhansel	Mini	03:11:29	00:00:05
1	3	(Czech Republic) Martin Prokop	Ford	03:09:42	00:04:42	3	(Czech Republic) Martin Prokop	Ford	03:15:47	00:04:23
2	1	(Qatar) Nasser Al-Attiyah	Toyota	04:03:14		1	(France) Stéphane Peterhansel	Mini	07:17:18	
2	2	(France) Stéphane Peterhansel	Mini	04:05:49	00:02:35	2	(Spain) Carlos Sainz	Mini	07:23:55	00:06:37
2	3	(Spain) Carlos Sainz	Mini	04:12:31	00:09:17	3	(Qatar) Nasser Al-Attiyah	Toyota	07:26:32	00:09:14
3	1	(Qatar) Nasser Al-Attiyah	Toyota	03:17:39		1	(France) Stéphane Peterhansel	Mini	10:39:02	
3	2	(South Africa) Henk Lategan	Toyota	03:20:06	00:02:27	2	(Qatar) Nasser Al-Attiyah	Toyota	10:44:11	00:05:09
3	3	(France) Stéphane Peterhansel	Mini	03:21:44	00:04:05	3	(France) Mathieu Serradori	Century	11:05:23	00:26:21
4	1	(Qatar) Nasser Al-Attiyah	Toyota	02:35:59		1	(France) Stéphane Peterhansel	Mini	13:15:12	
4	2	(France) Stéphane Peterhansel	Mini	02:36:10	00:00:11	2	(Qatar) Nasser Al-Attiyah	Toyota	13:20:10	00:04:58
4	3	(South Africa) Henk Lategan	Toyota	02:37:29	00:01:30	3	(Spain) Carlos Sainz	Mini	13:51:31	00:36:19
5	1	(South Africa) Giniel de Villiers	Toyota	05:09:25		1	(France) Stéphane Peterhansel	Mini	18:28:02	
5	2	(South Africa) Brian Baragwanath	Century	05:10:23	00:00:58	2	(Qatar) Nasser Al-Attiyah	Toyota	18:34:13	00:06:11
5	3	(France) Stéphane Peterhansel	Mini	05:11:50	00:02:25	3	(Spain) Carlos Sainz	Mini	19:16:15	00:48:13
6	1	(Spain) Carlos Sainz	Mini	03:38:27		1	(France) Stéphane Peterhansel	Mini	22:14:03	
6	2	(Saudi Arabia) Yazeed Al-Rajhi	Toyota	03:42:30	00:04:03	2	(Qatar) Nasser Al-Attiyah	Toyota	22:19:56	00:05:53
6	3	(Qatar) Nasser Al-Attiyah	Toyota	03:45:43	00:07:16	3	(Spain) Carlos Sainz	Mini	22:54:42	00:40:39
7	1	(Saudi Arabia) Yazeed Al-Rajhi	Toyota	04:21:59		1	(France) Stéphane Peterhansel	Mini	26:30:50	
7	2	(France) Stéphane Peterhansel	Mini	04:22:47	00:00:48	2	(Qatar) Nasser Al-Attiyah	Toyota	26:44:43	00:07:53
7	3	(Spain) Carlos Sainz	Mini	04:23:14	00:01:15	3	(Spain) Carlos Sainz	Mini	27:17:56	00:41:06
8	1	(Qatar) Nasser Al-Attiyah	Toyota	02:56:56		1	(France) Stéphane Peterhansel	Mini	29:36:49	
8	2	(Spain) Carlos Sainz	Mini	02:57:48	00:00:52	2	(Qatar) Nasser Al-Attiyah	Toyota	29:41:39	00:04:50
8	3	(France) Stéphane Peterhansel	Mini	02:59:59	00:03:03	3	(Spain) Carlos Sainz	Mini	30:15:44	00:38:55
9	1	(France) Stéphane Peterhansel	Mini	04:50:27		1	(France) Stéphane Peterhansel	Mini	34:26:16	
9	2	(Qatar) Nasser Al-Attiyah	Toyota	05:02:27	00:12:00	2	(Qatar) Nasser Al-Attiyah	Toyota	34:44:06	00:17:50
9	3	(South Africa) Giniel de Villiers	Toyota	05:02:46	00:12:19	3	(Spain) Carlos Sainz	Mini	35:28:41	01:02:25
10	1	(Saudi Arabia) Yazeed Al-Rajhi	Toyota	03:03:57		1	(France) Stéphane Peterhansel	Mini	37:33:06	
10	2	(Qatar) Nasser Al-Attiyah	Toyota	03:06:01	00:02:04	2	(Qatar) Nasser Al-Attiyah	Toyota	37:50:07	00:17:01
10	3	(France) Stéphane Peterhansel	Mini	03:06:50	00:02:53	3	(Spain) Carlos Sainz	Mini	38:36:50	01:03:44
11	1	(Qatar) Nasser Al-Attiyah	Toyota	04:34:24		1	(France) Stéphane Peterhansel	Mini	42:09:26	
11	2	(France) Stéphane Peterhansel	Mini	04:36:20	00:01:56	2	(Qatar) Nasser Al-Attiyah	Toyota	42:24:31	00:15:05
11	3	(Spain) Carlos Sainz	Mini	04:36:50	00:02:26	3	(Spain) Carlos Sainz	Mini	43:13:40	01:04:14
12	1	(Spain) Carlos Sainz	Mini	02:17:33		1	(France) Stéphane Peterhansel	Mini	44:28:11	
12	2	(Qatar) Nasser Al-Attiyah	Toyota	02:19:46	00:02:13	2	(Qatar) Nasser Al-Attiyah	Toyota	44:42:02	00:13:51
12	3	(France) Stéphane Peterhansel	Mini	02:20:26	00:02:53	3	(Spain) Carlos Sainz	Mini	45:29:08	01:00:57

=== Light Prototypes ===
	Stage result					General classification				
Stage	Pos	Competitor	Make	Time	Gap	Pos	Competitor	Make	Time	Gap
Prologue	1	(United Kingdom) Kris Meeke	PH-Sport	00:06:40		1	(United Kingdom) Kris Meeke	PH-Sport	00:06:40	
Prologue	2	(United States) Seth Quintero	OT3	00:06:42	00:00:02	2	(United States) Seth Quintero	OT3	00:06:42	00:00:02
Prologue	3	(United States) Mitch Guthrie	OT3	00:06:50	00:00:10	3	(United States) Mitch Guthrie	OT3	00:06:50	00:00:10
1	1	(Spain) Cristina Gutiérrez Herrero	OT3	03:35:56		1	(Spain) Cristina Gutiérrez Herrero	OT3	03:42:57	
1	2	(United States) Seth Quintero	OT3	03:56:43	00:20:47	2	(United States) Seth Quintero	OT3	04:03:25	00:20:28
1	3	(Czech Republic) Josef Macháček	Can-Am	04:01:32	00:25:36	3	(Czech Republic) Josef Macháček	Can-Am	04:08:53	00:25:56
2	1	(United States) Seth Quintero	OT3	05:15:41		1	(Spain) Cristina Gutiérrez Herrero	OT3	09:01:00	
2	2	(Spain) Cristina Gutiérrez Herrero	OT3	05:18:03	00:02:22	2	(United States) Seth Quintero	OT3	09:18:33	00:17:33
2	3	(United States) Mitch Guthrie	OT3	05:26:20	00:10:39	3	(Sweden) Mattias Ekström	Yamaha	09:43:15	00:42:15
3	1	(United States) Seth Quintero	OT3	04:22:37		1	(Spain) Cristina Gutiérrez Herrero	OT3	13:32:57	
3	2	(United States) Mitch Guthrie	OT3	04:29:24	00:06:47	2	(United States) Seth Quintero	OT3	13:41:10	00:08:13
3	3	(Spain) Cristina Gutiérrez Herrero	OT3	04:31:57	00:09:20	3	(France) Jean-Luc Pisson	PH-Sport	14:24:50	00:51:53
4	1	(United Kingdom) Kris Meeke	PH-Sport	03:18:42		1	(United States) Seth Quintero	OT3	17:02:49	
4	2	(United States) Mitch Guthrie	OT3	03:18:48	00:00:06	2	(Spain) Cristina Gutiérrez Herrero	OT3	17:46:57	00:44:08
4	3	(United States) Seth Quintero	OT3	03:21:39	00:02:57	3	(Sweden) Mattias Ekström	Yamaha	17:58:50	00:56:01
5	1	(United States) Seth Quintero	OT3	05:49:43		1	(United States) Seth Quintero	OT3	22:52:32	
5	2	(United States) Mitch Guthrie	OT3	06:03:46	00:14:03	2	(Spain) Cristina Gutiérrez Herrero	OT3	24:12:44	01:20:12
5	3	(France) Lionel Baud	PH-Sport	06:04:29	00:14:46	3	(Sweden) Mattias Ekström	Yamaha	24:42:23	01:49:51
6	1	(United States) Seth Quintero	OT3	04:20:23		1	(United States) Seth Quintero	OT3	27:12:55	
6	2	(France) Jean Remy Bergounhe	PH-Sport	04:47:44	00:27:21	2	(Spain) Cristina Gutiérrez Herrero	OT3	29:09:49	01:56:54
6	3	(Czech Republic) Tomáš Enge	Can-Am	04:54:01	00:33:38	3	(France) Jean-Luc Pisson	PH-Sport	29:49:32	02:36:37
7	1	(Spain) Cristina Gutiérrez Herrero	OT3	05:25:41		1	(United States) Seth Quintero	OT3	32:39:14	
7	2	(United States) Seth Quintero	OT3	05:26:19	00:00:38	2	(Spain) Cristina Gutiérrez Herrero	OT3	34:35:30	01:56:16
7	3	(Czech Republic) Josef Macháček	Can-Am	05:51:48	00:26:07	3	(Czech Republic) Josef Macháček	Can-Am	36:29:25	03:50:11
8	1	(United States) Seth Quintero	OT3	03:44:05		1	(United States) Seth Quintero	OT3	36:23:19	
8	2	(Czech Republic) Josef Macháček	Can-Am	04:00:56	00:16:51	2	(Czech Republic) Josef Macháček	Can-Am	40:30:21	04:07:02
8	3	(Portugal) Rui Miguel Costa Carneiro	MMP	04:02:27	00:18:22	3	(Italy) Camelia Liparoti	Yamaha	41:46:48	05:23:29
9	1	(Spain) Cristina Gutiérrez Herrero	OT3	06:17:40		1	(Czech Republic) Josef Macháček	Can-Am	47:05:35	
9	2	(Czech Republic) Tomáš Enge	Can-Am	06:18:27	00:00:47	2	(Italy) Camelia Liparoti	Yamaha	48:22:21	01:16:46
9	3	(France) Philippe Pinchedez	Pinch Racing	06:19:08	00:01:28	3	(France) Philippe Pinchedez	Pinch Racing	49:26:45	02:21:10
10	1	(United Kingdom) Kris Meeke	PH-Sport	03:34:41		1	(Czech Republic) Josef Macháček	Can-Am	51:04:18	
10	2	(France) Lionel Baud	PH-Sport	03:36:09	00:01:28	2	(Italy) Camelia Liparoti	Yamaha	52:35:07	01:30:49
10	3	(France) Jean Remy Bergounhe	PH-Sport	03:44:39	00:09:58	3	(France) Philippe Pinchedez	Pinch Racing	53:30:16	02:25:58
11	1	(United States) Seth Quintero	OT3	04:58:17		1	(Czech Republic) Josef Macháček	Can-Am	56:37:21	
11	2	(United Kingdom) Kris Meeke	PH-Sport	05:16:19	00:18:02	2	(Italy) Camelia Liparoti	Yamaha	58:39:15	02:01:54
11	3	(France) Lionel Baud	PH-Sport	05:19:38	00:21:21	3	(France) Philippe Pinchedez	Pinch Racing	59:22:31	02:45:10
12	1	(United Kingdom) Kris Meeke	PH-Sport	02:41:11		1	(Czech Republic) Josef Macháček	Can-Am	59:39:01	
12	2	(France) Lionel Baud	PH-Sport	02:45:54	00:04:43	2	(Italy) Camelia Liparoti	Yamaha	61:51:24	02:12:23
12	3	(United States) Seth Quintero	OT3	02:47:15	00:06:04	3	(France) Philippe Pinchedez	Pinch Racing	62:15:27	02:36:26

=== UTVs ===
	Stage result					General classification				
Stage	Pos	Competitor	Make	Time	Gap	Pos	Competitor	Make	Time	Gap
Prologue	1	(United States) Austin Jones	Can-Am	00:06:43		1	(United States) Austin Jones	Can-Am	00:06:43	
Prologue	2	(Brazil) Reinaldo Varela	Can-Am	00:06:47	00:00:04	2	(Brazil) Reinaldo Varela	Can-Am	00:06:47	00:00:04
Prologue	3	(Saudi Arabia) Saleh Alsaif	Can-Am	00:06:48	00:00:05	3	(Saudi Arabia) Saleh Alsaif	Can-Am	00:06:48	00:00:05
1	1	(United States) Austin Jones	Can-Am	03:42:55		1	(United States) Austin Jones	Can-Am	03:49:38	
1	2	(Chile) Francisco López Contardo	Can-Am	03:43:32	00:00:37	2	(Chile) Francisco López Contardo	Can-Am	03:50:23	00:00:45
1	3	(Poland) Aron Domżała	Can-Am	03:43:39	00:00:44	3	(Poland) Aron Domżała	Can-Am	03:50:28	00:00:50
2	1	(Saudi Arabia) Saleh Alsaif	Can-Am	05:05:07		1	(Chile) Francisco López Contardo	Can-Am	08:58:13	
2	2	(Spain) Gerard Farrés Güell	Can-Am	05:06:47	00:01:40	2	(Poland) Aron Domżała	Can-Am	08:58:52	00:00:39
2	3	(Chile) Francisco López Contardo	Can-Am	05:07:50	00:02:43	3	(Spain) Gerard Farrés Güell	Can-Am	08:59:14	00:01:01
3	1	(Chile) Francisco López Contardo	Can-Am	04:20:57		1	(Chile) Francisco López Contardo	Can-Am	13:19:10	
3	2	(United States) Austin Jones	Can-Am	04:21:20	00:00:23	2	(Poland) Aron Domżała	Can-Am	13:25:18	00:06:08
3	3	(Poland) Michał Goczał	Can-Am	04:21:21	00:00:24	3	(United States) Austin Jones	Can-Am	13:26:23	00:07:13
4	1	(Poland) Aron Domżała	Can-Am	03:16:57		1	(Chile) Francisco López Contardo	Can-Am	16:38:57	
4	2	(Poland) Michał Goczał	Can-Am	03:19:41	00:02:44	2	(Poland) Aron Domżała	Can-Am	16:42:15	00:03:18
4	3	(United States) Austin Jones	Can-Am	03:19:45	00:02:48	3	(United States) Austin Jones	Can-Am	16:46:08	00:07:11
5	1	(Chile) Francisco López Contardo	Can-Am	05:47:32		1	(Chile) Francisco López Contardo	Can-Am	22:26:29	
5	2	(Qatar) Khalifa Al-Attiyah	Can-Am	05:49:24	00:01:52	2	(Poland) Aron Domżała	Can-Am	22:36:20	00:09:51
5	3	(United States) Austin Jones	Can-Am	05:51:49	00:04:17	3	(United States) Austin Jones	Can-Am	22:38:57	00:12:28
6	1	(Qatar) Khalifa Al-Attiyah	Can-Am	04:20:46		1	(Poland) Aron Domżała	Can-Am	27:04:29	
6	2	(Spain) Gerard Farrés Güell	Can-Am	04:24:57	00:04:11	2	(United States) Austin Jones	Can-Am	27:05:09	00:00:40
6	3	(United States) Austin Jones	Can-Am	04:26:12	00:05:26	3	(Chile) Francisco López Contardo	Can-Am	27:40:20	00:35:51
7	1	(Chile) Francisco López Contardo	Can-Am	05:15:34		1	(Poland) Aron Domżała	Can-Am	32:30:33	
7	2	(Saudi Arabia) Saleh Alsaif	Can-Am	05:20:46	00:05:12	2	(United States) Austin Jones	Can-Am	32:40:04	00:09:31
7	3	(Brazil) Reinaldo Varela	Can-Am	05:22:47	00:07:13	3	(Chile) Francisco López Contardo	Can-Am	32:55:54	00:25:21
8	1	(Chile) Francisco López Contardo	Can-Am	03:37:45		1	(United States) Austin Jones	Can-Am	36:13:48	
8	2	(Russia) Sergei Kariakin	Can-Am	03:38:37	00:00:52	2	(Chile) Francisco López Contardo	Can-Am	36:33:39	00:19:51
8	3	(Brazil) Reinaldo Varela	Can-Am	03:39:16	00:01:31	3	(Poland) Aron Domżała	Can-Am	36:44:19	00:30:31
9	1	(Chile) Francisco López Contardo	Can-Am	05:31:41		1	(Chile) Francisco López Contardo	Can-Am	42:05:20	
9	2	(Qatar) Khalifa Al-Attiyah	Can-Am	05:43:15	00:11:34	2	(United States) Austin Jones	Can-Am	42:17:45	00:12:25
9	3	(Poland) Marek Goczał	Can-Am	05:53:27	00:21:46	3	(Poland) Aron Domżała	Can-Am	42:43:23	00:38:03
10	1	(Russia) Sergei Kariakin	Can-Am	03:31:17		1	(Chile) Francisco López Contardo	Can-Am	45:39:18	
10	2	(United States) Austin Jones	Can-Am	03:31:46	00:00:29	2	(United States) Austin Jones	Can-Am	45:49:31	00:10:13
10	3	(Poland) Michał Goczał	Can-Am	03:32:27	00:01:10	3	(Poland) Aron Domżała	Can-Am	46:21:59	00:42:41
11	1	(Chile) Francisco López Contardo	Can-Am	05:10:30		1	(Chile) Francisco López Contardo	Can-Am	50:49:48	
11	2	(Spain) Gerard Farrés Güell	Can-Am	05:15:51	00:05:21	2	(United States) Austin Jones	Can-Am	51:08:12	00:18:24
11	3	(Qatar) Khalifa Al-Attiyah	Can-Am	05:15:58	00:05:28	3	(Poland) Aron Domżała	Can-Am	51:44:04	00:54:16
12	1	(Brazil) Reinaldo Varela	Can-Am	02:44:26		1	(Chile) Francisco López Contardo	Can-Am	53:41:02	
12	2	(Poland) Michał Goczał	Can-Am	02:45:08	00:00:42	2	(United States) Austin Jones	Can-Am	53:58:25	00:17:23
12	3	(Netherlands) Kees Koolen	Can-Am	02:48:02	00:03:36	3	(Poland) Aron Domżała	Can-Am	54:32:55	00:51:53

=== Trucks ===
	Stage result					General classification				
Stage	Pos	Competitor	Make	Time	Gap	Pos	Competitor	Make	Time	Gap
Prologue	1	(Belarus) Siarhei Viazovich	MAZ	00:06:38		1	(Belarus) Siarhei Viazovich	MAZ	00:06:38	
Prologue	2	(Belarus) Aliaksei Vishneuski	MAZ	00:06:39	00:00:01	2	(Belarus) Aliaksei Vishneuski	MAZ	00:06:39	00:00:01
Prologue	3	(Czech Republic) Martin Macík	Iveco	00:06:41	00:00:03	3	(Czech Republic) Martin Macík	Iveco	00:06:41	00:00:03
1	1	(Russia) Dmitry Sotnikov	Kamaz	03:16:47		1	(Russia) Dmitry Sotnikov	Kamaz	03:23:55	
1	2	(Czech Republic) Aleš Loprais	Praga	03:24:47	00:08:00	2	(Czech Republic) Aleš Loprais	Praga	03:31:34	00:07:39
1	3	(Russia) Anton Shibalov	Kamaz	03:24:59	00:08:12	3	(Russia) Anton Shibalov	Kamaz	03:31:44	00:07:49
2	1	(Russia) Dmitry Sotnikov	Kamaz	04:37:44		1	(Russia) Dmitry Sotnikov	Kamaz	08:01:39	
2	2	(Russia) Airat Mardeev	Kamaz	04:42:01	00:04:17	2	(Belarus) Siarhei Viazovich	MAZ	08:18:53	00:17:14
2	3	(Belarus) Siarhei Viazovich	MAZ	04:44:14	00:06:30	3	(Russia) Anton Shibalov	Kamaz	08:23:42	00:22:03
3	1	(Belarus) Siarhei Viazovich	MAZ	03:45:14		1	(Russia) Dmitry Sotnikov	Kamaz	11:47:11	
3	2	(Russia) Dmitry Sotnikov	Kamaz	03:45:32	00:00:18	2	(Belarus) Siarhei Viazovich	MAZ	12:04:07	00:16:56
3	3	(Russia) Anton Shibalov	Kamaz	03:46:30	00:01:16	3	(Russia) Anton Shibalov	Kamaz	12:10:12	00:23:01
4	1	(Russia) Dmitry Sotnikov	Kamaz	02:58:47		1	(Russia) Dmitry Sotnikov	Kamaz	14:45:58	
4	2	(Russia) Andrey Karginov	Kamaz	02:58:57	00:00:10	2	(Czech Republic) Martin Macík	Iveco	15:12:20	00:26:22
4	3	(Belarus) Aliaksei Vishneuski	MAZ	02:59:01	00:00:14	3	(Russia) Anton Shibalov	Kamaz	15:12:55	00:26:57
5	1	(Russia) Dmitry Sotnikov	Kamaz	05:30:20		1	(Russia) Dmitry Sotnikov	Kamaz	20:16:18	
5	2	(Belarus) Aliaksei Vishneuski	MAZ	05:31:21	00:01:01	2	(Russia) Anton Shibalov	Kamaz	20:50:11	00:33:53
5	3	(Russia) Anton Shibalov	Kamaz	05:37:16	00:06:56	3	(Czech Republic) Martin Macík	Iveco	21:07:29	00:51:11
6	1	(Russia) Airat Mardeev	Kamaz	04:08:52		1	(Russia) Dmitry Sotnikov	Kamaz	24:26:18	
6	2	(Russia) Dmitry Sotnikov	Kamaz	04:10:00	00:01:08	2	(Russia) Anton Shibalov	Kamaz	25:03:52	00:37:34
6	3	(Russia) Anton Shibalov	Kamaz	04:13:41	00:04:49	3	(Russia) Airat Mardeev	Kamaz	25:28:01	01:01:43
7	1	(Russia) Dmitry Sotnikov	Kamaz	04:45:52		1	(Russia) Dmitry Sotnikov	Kamaz	29:12:10	
7	2	(Russia) Airat Mardeev	Kamaz	04:49:15	00:03:23	2	(Russia) Anton Shibalov	Kamaz	29:58:06	00:45:56
7	3	(Russia) Anton Shibalov	Kamaz	04:54:14	00:08:22	3	(Russia) Airat Mardeev	Kamaz	30:17:16	01:05:06
8	1	(Russia) Anton Shibalov	Kamaz	03:19:40		1	(Russia) Dmitry Sotnikov	Kamaz	32:34:18	
8	2	(Russia) Dmitry Sotnikov	Kamaz	03:22:08	00:02:28	2	(Russia) Anton Shibalov	Kamaz	33:17:46	00:43:28
8	3	(Russia) Andrey Karginov	Kamaz	03:22:59	00:03:19	3	(Russia) Airat Mardeev	Kamaz	33:47:33	01:13:15
9	1	(Czech Republic) Martin Macík	Iveco	05:05:54		1	(Russia) Dmitry Sotnikov	Kamaz	37:42:49	
9	2	(Russia) Airat Mardeev	Kamaz	05:08:21	00:02:27	2	(Russia) Anton Shibalov	Kamaz	38:27:52	00:45:03
9	3	(Russia) Dmitry Sotnikov	Kamaz	05:08:31	00:02:37	3	(Russia) Airat Mardeev	Kamaz	38:55:54	01:13:05
10	1	(Czech Republic) Martin Macík	Iveco	03:13:02		1	(Russia) Dmitry Sotnikov	Kamaz	40:57:31	
10	2	(Russia) Dmitry Sotnikov	Kamaz	03:14:42	00:01:40	2	(Russia) Anton Shibalov	Kamaz	41:44:53	00:47:22
10	3	(Russia) Airat Mardeev	Kamaz	03:16:18	00:03:16	3	(Russia) Airat Mardeev	Kamaz	42:12:12	01:14:41
11	1	(Russia) Anton Shibalov	Kamaz	04:46:38		1	(Russia) Dmitry Sotnikov	Kamaz	45:51:33	
11	2	(Russia) Airat Mardeev	Kamaz	04:50:51	00:04:13	2	(Russia) Anton Shibalov	Kamaz	46:31:31	00:39:58
11	3	(Belarus) Aliaksei Vishneuski	MAZ	04:51:31	00:04:53	3	(Russia) Airat Mardeev	Kamaz	47:03:03	01:11:30
12	1	(Czech Republic) Martin Macík	Iveco	02:32:27		1	(Russia) Dmitry Sotnikov	Kamaz	48:23:21	
12	2	(Russia) Anton Shibalov	Kamaz	02:33:27	00:01:00	2	(Russia) Anton Shibalov	Kamaz	49:02:59	00:39:38
12	3	(Russia) Dmitry Sotnikov	Kamaz	02:34:31	00:02:04	3	(Russia) Airat Mardeev	Kamaz	49:37:56	01:14:35

=== Classics ===
	Stage result					General classification				
Stage	Pos	Competitor	Make	Points	Gap	Pos	Competitor	Make	Points	Gap
Prologue	Did not participate									
1	1	(France) Marc Douton	Sunhill	121		1	(France) Marc Douton	Sunhill	121	
1	2	(Spain) Carlos Vento Sanchez	Mercedes-Benz	176	+55	2	(Spain) Carlos Vento Sanchez	Mercedes-Benz	176	+55
1	3	(Spain) Antonio Gutierrez	Mercedes-Benz	265	+144	3	(Spain) Antonio Gutierrez	Mercedes-Benz	265	+144
2	1	(France) Marc Douton	Sunhill	106		1	(France) Marc Douton	Sunhill	227	
2	2	(Spain) Juan Donatiu	Mitsubishi	299	+193	2	(Spain) Juan Donatiu	Mitsubishi	703	+476
2	3	(France) Frédéric Verdaguer	Sunhill	676	+570	3	(France) Frédéric Verdaguer	Sunhill	1146	+919
3	1	(France) Marc Douton	Sunhill	77		1	(France) Marc Douton	Sunhill	304	
3	2	(Spain) Juan Donatiu	Mitsubishi	103	+26	2	(Spain) Juan Donatiu	Mitsubishi	806	+502
3	3	(France) Lilian Harichoury	Renault	405	+328	3	(France) Frédéric Verdaguer	Sunhill	1800	+1496
4	1	(France) Marc Douton	Sunhill	73		1	(France) Marc Douton	Sunhill	377	
4	2	(Spain) Juan Donatiu	Mitsubishi	125	+52	2	(Spain) Juan Donatiu	Mitsubishi	931	+554
4	3	(Czech Republic) Ondřej Klymčiw	Škoda	127	+54	3	(France) Frédéric Verdaguer	Sunhill	2218	+1841
5	1	(France) Marc Douton	Sunhill	116		1	(France) Marc Douton	Sunhill	493	
5	2	(Spain) Kilian Revuelta	Toyota	138	+22	2	(Spain) Juan Donatiu	Mitsubishi	1191	+698
5	3	(Spain) Francisco J Benavente	Nissan	138	+22	3	(France) Frédéric Verdaguer	Sunhill	2544	+2051
6	1	(Czech Republic) Ondřej Klymčiw	Škoda	91		1	(France) Marc Douton	Sunhill	587	
6	2	(France) Marc Douton	Sunhill	94	+3	2	(Spain) Juan Donatiu	Mitsubishi	1363	+776
6	3	(Spain) Kilian Revuelta	Toyota	118	+27	3	(France) Frédéric Verdaguer	Sunhill	2940	+2353
7	1	(France) Marc Douton	Sunhill	19		1	(France) Marc Douton	Sunhill	606	
7	2	(Spain) Kilian Revuelta	Toyota	31	+12	2	(Spain) Juan Donatiu	Mitsubishi	1431	+825
7	3	(Czech Republic) Ondřej Klymčiw	Škoda	50	+31	3	(France) Frédéric Verdaguer	Sunhill	3109	+2503
8	1	(Spain) Kilian Revuelta	Toyota	27		1	(France) Marc Douton	Sunhill	646	
8	2	(France) Marc Douton	Sunhill	40	+13	2	(Spain) Juan Donatiu	Mitsubishi	1757	+1111
8	3	(Czech Republic) Ondřej Klymčiw	Škoda	46	+19	3	(France) Frédéric Verdaguer	Sunhill	3347	+2701
9	1	(Spain) Kilian Revuelta	Toyota	69		1	(France) Marc Douton	Sunhill	735	
9	2	(France) Marc Douton	Sunhill	89	+20	2	(Spain) Juan Donatiu	Mitsubishi	1905	+1170
9	3	(Spain) Antonio Gutierrez	Mercedes-Benz	113	+44	3	(France) Lilian Harichoury	Renault	4900	+4165
10	1	(France) Lilian Harichoury	Renault	129		1	(France) Marc Douton	Sunhill	886	
10	2	(Spain) Kilian Revuelta	Toyota	148	+19	2	(Spain) Juan Donatiu	Mitsubishi	2361	+1475
10	3	(France) Marc Douton	Sunhill	151	+22	3	(France) Lilian Harichoury	Renault	5029	+4143
11	1	(France) Stephan Lamarre	Mitsubishi	38		1	(France) Marc Douton	Sunhill	943	
11	2	(France) Marc Douton	Sunhill	57	+19	2	(Spain) Juan Donatiu	Mitsubishi	2517	+1574
11	3	(Spain) Kilian Revuelta	Toyota	76	+38	3	(France) Lilian Harichoury	Renault	5179	+4236
12	1	(Spain) Antonio Gutierrez	Mercedes-Benz	15		1	(France) Marc Douton	Sunhill	961	
12	2	(France) Marc Douton	Sunhill	18	+3	2	(Spain) Juan Donatiu	Mitsubishi	2650	+1689
12	3	(Czech Republic) Ondřej Klymčiw	Škoda	20	+5	3	(France) Lilian Harichoury	Renault	5205	+4244

== Final standings ==
=== Bikes ===
Rank.	Driver	Bike	Time	Difference
1	(Argentina) Kevin Benavides	Honda CRF450R	47:18:14	-----
2	(United States) Ricky Brabec	Honda CRF450R	47:23:10	+ 0:04:56
3	(United Kingdom) Sam Sunderland	KTM 450 Factory	47:34:11	+ 0:15:57
4	(Australia) Daniel Sanders	KTM 450 Factory	47:57:06	+ 0:38:52
5	(United States) Skyler Howes	KTM 450 Rally Replica	48:10:47	+ 0:52:33
6	(Spain) Lorenzo Santolino	Sherco 450 RTR	48:14:44	+ 0:58:30
7	(Chile) Pablo Quintanilla	Husqvarna FR 450 Rally	48:44:53	+ 1:26:39
8	(Slovakia) Štefan Svitko	KTM 450 Rally Replica	49:01:21	+ 1:43:07
9	(Austria) Matthias Walkner	KTM 450 Factory	49:50:26	+ 2:32:12
10	(Czech Republic) Martin Michek	KTM 450 Rally Replica	50:00:51	+ 2:42:37

=== Quads ===
Rank.	Driver	Vehicle	Time	Difference
1	(Argentina) Manuel Andújar	Yamaha Raptor 700R	60:28:29	-----
2	(Chile) Giovanni Enrico	Yamaha Raptor 700R	61:02:13	0:33:44
3	(United States) Pablo Copetti	Yamaha Raptor 700R	63:29:27	3:00:58
4	(Poland) Kamil Wiśniewski	Yamaha	67:18:34	6:50:05
5	(Czech Republic) Tomáš Kubiena	Yamaha Raptor 700R	67:40:14	7:11:45
6	(France) Romain Dutu	Yamaha Raptor 700R	69:45:40	9:17:11
7	(Lithuania) Laisvydas Kancius	Yamaha Raptor 700R	73:11:34	12:43:05
8	(Argentina) Tobias Juan Carrizo	Yamaha Raptor 700R	78:52:03	18:23:34
9	(Spain) Toni Vingut	Yamaha Raptor 700R	83:54:39	23:26:10
10	(Bolivia) Suany Martinez	Can-Am Renegade 850	89:34:54	29:06:25

=== Cars ===
Rank.	Driver	Co-Driver	Car	Time	Difference
1	(France) Stéphane Peterhansel	(France) Edouard Boulanger	MINI John Cooper Works Buggy	44:28:11	-----
2	(Qatar) Nasser Al-Attiyah	(France) Matthieu Baumel	Toyota Hilux	44:42:02	+ 0:13:51
3	(Spain) Carlos Sainz	(Spain) Lucas Cruz	MINI John Cooper Works Buggy	45:29:08	+ 1:00:57
4	(Poland) Jakub Przygonski	(Germany) Timo Gottschalk	Toyota Hilux	47:03:14	+ 2:35:03
5	(Spain) Nani Roma	(France) Alexandre Winocq	Prodrive BRX Hunter	47:49:59	+ 3:21:48
6	(Russia) Vladimir Vasilyev	(Ukraine) Dmytro Tsyro	MINI John Cooper Works Rally	47:57:49	+ 3:29:38
7	(United Arab Emirates) Khalid Al Qassimi	(France) Xavier Panseri	Peugeot 3008 DKR	48:01:42	+ 3:33:31
8	(South Africa) Giniel de Villiers	(Spain) Alex Haro Bravo	Toyota Hilux	48:25:50	+ 3:57:39
9	(Czech Republic) Martin Prokop	(Czech Republic) Viktor Chytka	Ford Raptor RS Cross Country	48:37:32	+ 4:09:21
10	(France) Cyril Despres	(Switzerland) Mike Horn	Peugeot 3008 DKR	49:19:20	+ 4:51:09

=== Light Prototypes ===
Rank.	Driver	Co-Driver	Car	Time	Difference
1	(Czech Republic) Josef Macháček	(Czech Republic) Pavel Vyoral	Can-Am DV 21	59:39:01	-----
2	(Italy) Camelia Liparoti	(Germany) Annett Fischer	Yamaha YXZ1000R	61:51:24	2:12:23
3	(France) Philippe Pinchedez	(France) Vincent Ferri	Pinch Racing T3RR	62:15:27	2:36:26
4	(United States) Seth Quintero	(Germany) Dennis Zenz	OT3-02	62:30:15	2:51:14
5	(France) Jean-Luc Pisson	(France) Valentin Sarreaud	PH-Sport Zephyr	62:43:38	3:04:37
6	(France) Jean Remy Bergounhe	(France) Jean Brucy	PH-Sport Zephyr	63:47:56	4:08:55
7	(France) Lionel Baud	(France) Loic Minaudier	PH-Sport Zephyr	64:01:16	4:22:15
8	(Portugal) Rui Miguel Costa Carneiro	(Portugal) Filipe Serra	MMP Can-Am	65:17:00	5:37:59
9	(United Arab Emirates) Mansour Al Helei	(United Kingdom) Michael Orr	PH-Sport Zephyr	66:27:03	6:48:02
10	(Czech Republic) Tomáš Enge	(Czech Republic) Vlastimil Tosenovsky	Can-Am DV 21	71:27:52	11:48:51

=== UTVs ===
Rank.	Driver	Co-Driver	Car	Time	Difference
1	(Chile) Francisco López Contardo	(Chile) Juan Pablo Latrach Vinagre	Can-Am XRS	53:41:02	-----
2	(United States) Austin Jones	(Brazil) Gustavo Gugelmin	Can-Am XRS	53:58:25	0:17:23
3	(Poland) Aron Domżała	(Poland) Maciej Marton	Can-Am XRS	54:32:55	0:51:53
4	(Poland) Michał Goczał	(Poland) Szymon Gospodarczyk	Can-Am XRS	54:55:00	1:13:58
5	(Brazil) Reinaldo Varela	(Brazil) Maykel Justo	Can-Am XRS	55:08:07	1:27:05
6	(Netherlands) Kees Koolen	(Netherlands) Jurgen van den Goorbergh	Can-Am XRS	57:31:49	3:50:47
7	(Spain) Jose Antonio Hinojo Lopez	(Spain) Gil Diego Ortega	Can-Am Maverick X3	57:39:26	3:58:24
8	(Poland) Marek Goczał	(Poland) Rafał Marton	Can-Am XRS	58:22:11	4:41:09
9	(Qatar) Khalifa Al-Attiyah	(Italy) Paolo Ceci	Can-Am XRS	58:23:20	4:42:18
10	(France) Eric Abel	(France) Christian Manez	Can-Am Maverick X3	59:24:57	5:43:55

=== Trucks ===
Rank.	Driver	Co-Driver	Technician	Truck	Time	Difference
1	(Russia) Dmitry Sotnikov	(Russia) Ruslan Akhmadeev	(Russia) Ilgiz Akhmetzianov	Kamaz 43509	48:23:21	-----
2	(Russia) Anton Shibalov	(Russia) Dmitrii Nikitin	(Russia) Ivan Tatarinov	Kamaz 43509	49:02:59	0:39:38
3	(Russia) Airat Mardeev	(Russia) Dmitriy Svistunov	(Russia) Akhmet Galiautdinov	Kamaz 43509	49:37:56	1:14:35
4	(Czech Republic) Martin Macík	(Czech Republic) František Tomášek	(Czech Republic) David Švanda	Iveco PowerStar	50:09:12	1:45:51
5	(Czech Republic) Aleš Loprais	(Czech Republic) Petr Pokora	(United Arab Emirates) Khalid Alkendi	Praga V45 DKR	50:23:52	2:00:31
6	(Belarus) Aliaksei Vishneuski	(Belarus) Maksim Novikau	(Belarus) Siarhei Sachuk	MAZ 6440RR	50:39:53	2:16:32
7	(Russia) Andrey Karginov	(Russia) Andrey Mokeev	(Russia) Igor Leonov	Kamaz 43509	51:12:22	2:49:01
8	(Netherlands) Martin van den Brink	(Netherlands) Wouter De Graaf	(Czech Republic) Daniel Kozlovský	Renault C460	52:46:42	4:23:21
9	(Chile) Ignacio Casale	(Chile) Alvaro León	(Czech Republic) Petr Čapka	Tatra Phoenix	53:51:11	5:27:50
10	(Czech Republic) Martin Šoltys	(Czech Republic) David Schovánek	(Czech Republic) Tomáš Šikola	Tatra Phoenix	53:56:53	5:33:32

=== Classics ===
Rank.	Driver	Co-Driver	Technician	Vehicle	Points	Difference
1	(France) Marc Douton	(France) Emilien Etienne	None	Sunhill Buggy	961	-----
2	(Spain) Juan Donatiu	(Spain) Pere Serrat Puig	None	Mitsubishi Montero	2650	+1689
3	(France) Lilian Harichoury	(France) Luc Fertin	(France) Laurent Correia	Renault 420DCI	5205	+4244
4	(Spain) Kilian Revuelta	(Spain) Oscar Sanchez Hernandez	None	Toyota Land Cruiser	5838	+4877
5	(France) Frédéric Verdaguer	(France) Julie Verdaguer	None	Sunhill Buggy	8775	+7814
6	(France) Maxime Lacarrau	(France) Pierre Louis Quemin	None	Toyota Proto KDJ95	9327	+8366
7	(Italy) Luciano Carcheri	(Italy) Roberto Musi	None	Nissan Patrol	11285	+10324
8	(Spain) Miquel Angel Boet	(Spain) Alexandre Rabell	None	Mercedes-Benz Unimog	12619	+11658
9	(Belgium) Benoit Callewaert	(Belgium) Ghislain Morel	None	Volkswagen Baja	16189	+15228
10	(Spain) Antonio Gutierrez	(Spain) Luis Heras Rodriguez	None	Mercedes-Benz G-320	16215	+15254

=== Original by Motul ===
The "Original by Motul" category refers to bikes and quads competitors competing without any kind of assistance. The organizers provide 1 trunk per competitor for storage of the personal belongings, spare parts and tools. Competitors are only allowed to bring 1 headlight, 1 set of wheels, 1 set of tyres, 1 tent with sleeping bag and mattress, 1 travel bag and 1x 25L backpack. Organizers allow free use of the generators, compressors and tool-boxes in the bivouac. 31 competitors started the race in this category, and 20 reached the finish.

Rank.	Driver	Bike	Time	Difference
1	(Lithuania) Arūnas Gelažninkas	KTM 450 Rally Replica	55:04:23	-----
2	(Romania) Emanuel Gyenes	KTM 450 Rally Replica	56:06:28	1:02:05
3	(France) Benjamin Melot	KTM 450 Rally Replica	56:45:10	1:40:47
4	(Czech Republic) David Pabiška	KTM 450 Rally	59:12:13	4:07:50
5	(Slovenia) Simon Marčič	Husqvarna 450 Rally	65:09:28	10:05:05
6	(United Kingdom) Neil Hawker	Husqvarna 450 Rally	65:53:00	10:48:37
7	(Italy) Cesare Zacchetti	KTM 450 Rally	67:08:39	12:04:16
8	(Slovakia) Erik Vlčák	Husqvarna Rally Replica	67:27:33	12:23:10
9	(Czech Republic) Rudolf Lhotský	Husqvarna Rally Replica	68:28:22	13:23:59
10	(Saudi Arabia) Mishal Alghuneim	KTM 450 Rally	68:57:46	13:53:23

== Incidents ==
CS Santosh, riding Hero 450 Rally, suffered high speed crash on Stage 4, sustaining head injuries. Fellow riders performed CPR until the medics arrived. Santosh was placed in an induced coma awaiting further tests. Scans revealed no major injuries apart from dislocated shoulder, and no major issues that would impact recovery, was announced on 11 January 2021.

Toyota Gazoo Racing Hilux driver Henk Lategan crashed heavily on Stage 5, and was airlifted to hospital with a broken collar bone. His co-driver, Brett Cummings, walked away uninjured.

Two incidents took place on Stage 7. French rider Pierre Cherpin, riding Husqvarna bike, crashed heavily at kilometer 178, sustaining head injuries. He was airlifted to hospital and placed in an induced coma. Another Frenchman Olivier Susset collided with a Sodicars buggy at kilometer 419, driven by Manuel Plaza Perez and Mónica Plaza, and was hospitalized with suspected broken ankle and elbow. On 14 January 2021 Pierre Cherpin died while being transferred from Saudi Arabia to France.

Two more incidents occurred on Stage 8. Husqvarna biker Xavier de Soultrait crashed heavily and was hospitalized. Another Husqvarna rider, Maurizio Gerini, was taken to hospital after finishing the stage. Gerini suffered heavy fall 30 km to the finish, but managed to complete the stage. He was diagnosed with internal bleeding in abdomen area.

Three more bikers crashed out and were airlifted to the hospital on Stage 9. KTM rider Toby Price crashed on kilometre 155 and suffered broken collar bone and both wrists as well as extensive bruising. Luciano Benavides riding Honda was also airlifted after falling and dislocating his shoulder on kilometre 242. Husqvarna rider Maciej Giemza withdrew after he tore his shoulder ligaments and suffered two fractures in the foot after hitting a rock at 110 km/h and rolling several times.

On Stage 10, José Ignacio Cornejo, who entered the stage with an 11-minute lead in the overall standings in the bike category, crashed 252 kilometers into the stage. Cornejo continued to the finish of the stage, but was forced to retire by race organizers after a medical evaluation at the finishing area revealed a concussion. He was airlifted to a hospital directly from the finishing area.

Honda biker Juan Barreda Bort ran out of fuel at kilometre 267 on Stage 11, after missing the refueling point at kilometre 174. Bort was leading the race at a waypoint at kilometre 215. After failing to get help from other competitors for two hours, he called in for medical assistance and was airlifted to the hospital. Juan suffered a fall two days ago, where he fell unconscious for a short time, but was able to continue.
