= Camelia Liparoti =

Italian rally raid motorcycle rider (born 1973)

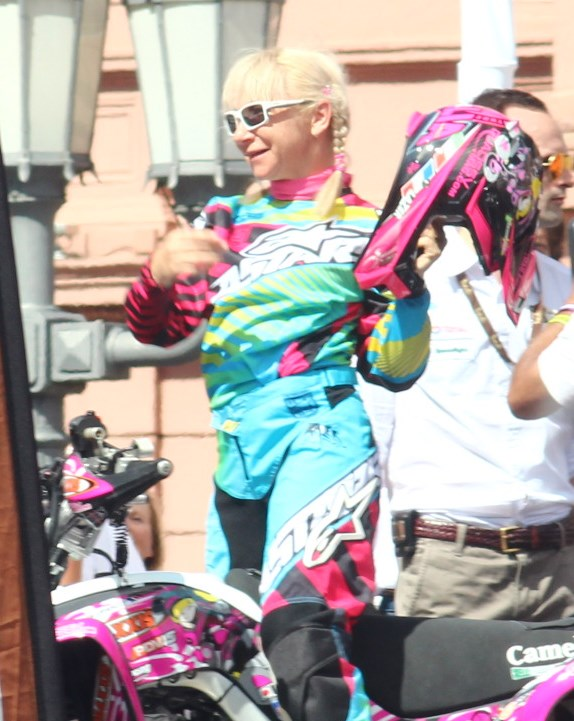
- Liparoti at 2015 Dakar Rally.
- Nationality: Italian
- Born: 11 July 1973 (age 53) Livorno, Italy
- Championships: FIM Cross-Country Rallies World Championship (women)
- Wins: 2009, 2010, 2011, 2012, 2013, 2014

Camelia Liparoti (born 11 July 1973) is an Italian rally raid racer. She won the FIM Women's Cross-Country Rallies World Cup six times between 2009 and 2014, the most by any rider.

== Biography ==
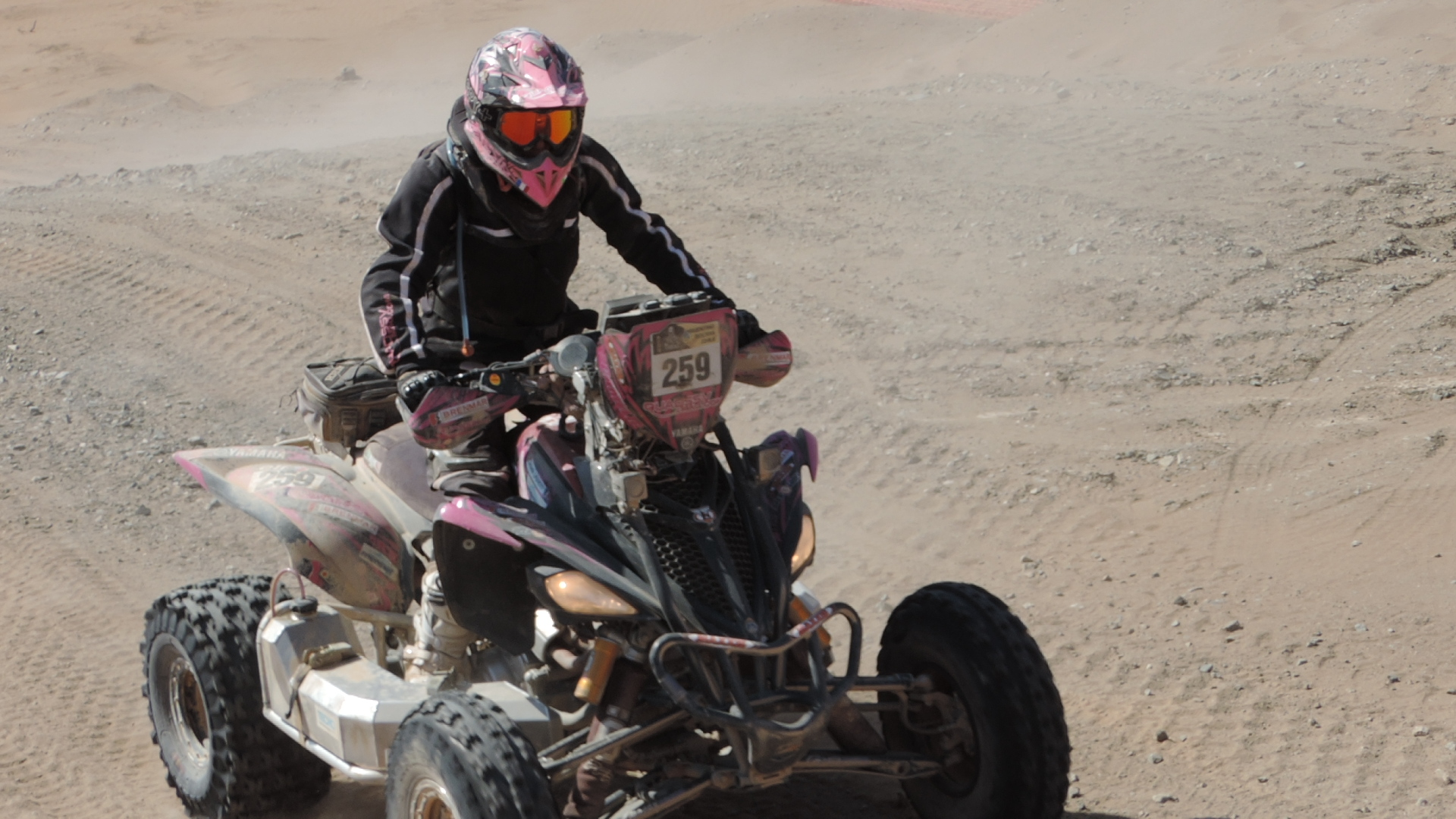
Liparoti at 2014 Dakar Rally.

Liparoti competed at the Dakar Rally from 2009 to 2017 in the quads class. For 2018, she switched to the UTV class, finishing fifth. With her participation in the 2021 Dakar Rally, Liparoti participated in her 13th consecutive Dakar. Just in 2021, her first podium in the final standing arrives with the second place in the T3 Light Prototypes category.

== Dakar Rally ==
Year	Class	Vehicle	Rank
2009	Quad	Yamaha	Ret
2010	Quad	Yamaha	13th
2011	Quad	Yamaha	10th
2012	Quad	Yamaha	9th
2013	Quad	Yamaha	15th
2014	Quad	Yamaha	13th
2015	Quad	Yamaha	15th
2016	Quad	Yamaha	11th
2017	Quad	Yamaha	13th
2018	UTV	Yamaha	5th
2019	UTV	Yamaha	37th
2020	UTV	Yamaha	Ret
2021	Light Prototypes	Yamaha YXZ1000R	2nd
