= Arūnas Gelažninkas =

Lithuanian motocross, enduro and rally raid rider

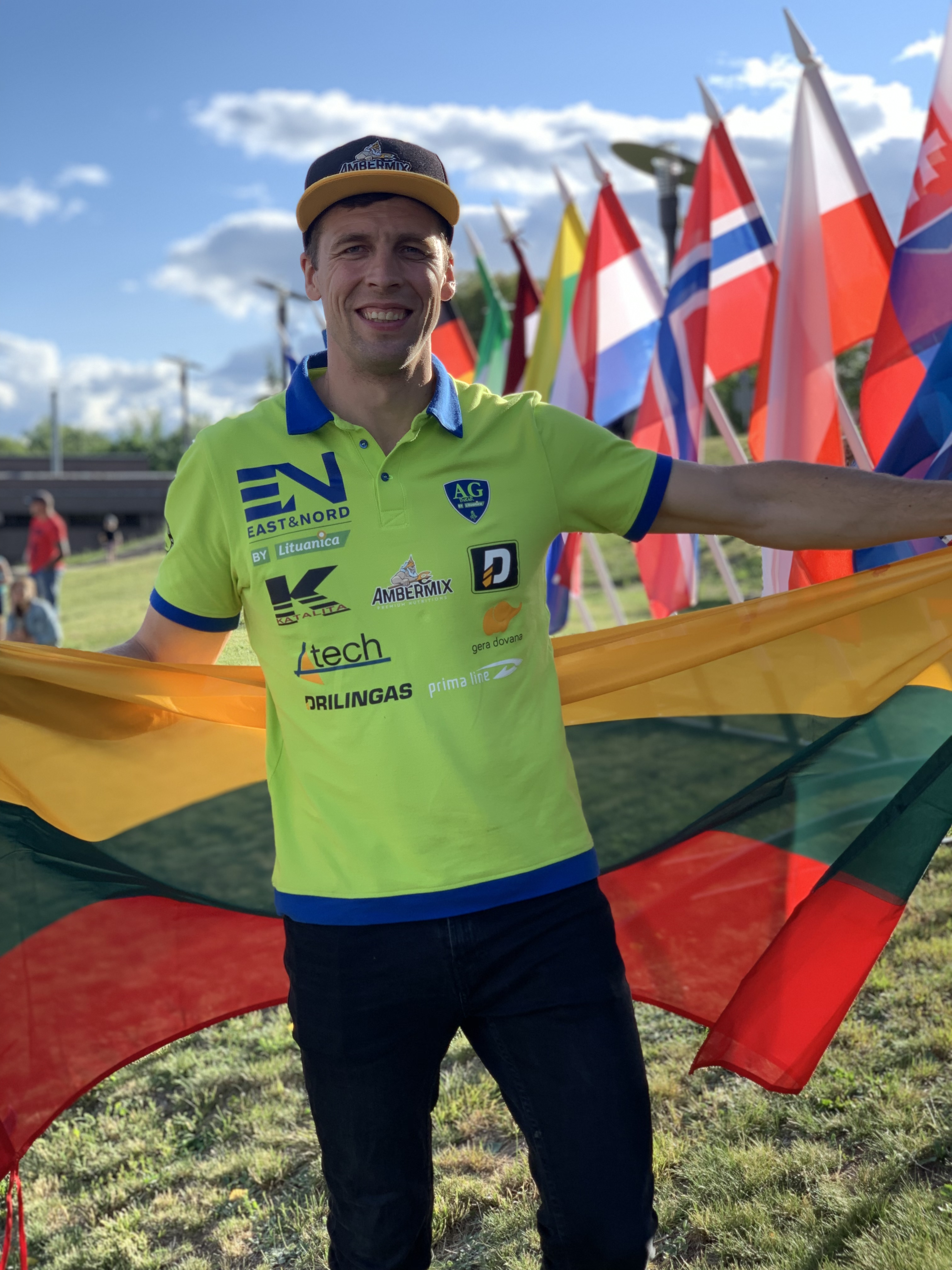

Personal information
- Nationality: (Lithuania) Lithuanian
- Born: October 12, 1985 (age 40) Neveronys, Lithuanian SSR, Soviet Union
- Years active: 1993-now
- Height: 188 cm (6 ft 2 in)
- Weight: 82 kg (181 lb)
- Website: https://agdakar.lt

Sport
- Sport: Motocross, Enduro, Rally Raid
- Team: Zigmas Dakar Team

Arūnas Gelažninkas (born 12 October 1985) is a Lithuanian motocross, enduro and rally raid rider. Gelažninkas is best known for being a multiple Lithuanian enduro and cross-country champion, 2019 Tuareg Rally champion as well winning 2021 Dakar Rally in Original by Motul category (formerly known as Malle Moto), making him the first and only Lithuanian to do so.

== Biography ==
A. Gelažninkas started his career in motocross when he was eight and was competing domestically initially. In 2005 Gelažninkas started training in United Kingdom and competing in British Motocross Championship. In addition to competing locally Gelažninkas has also participated in various events internationally, including representing Lithuania in Motocross of Nations, also competing in MX1, MX3 FIM Motocross World Championship as well as participating in Dakar Rally annually since 2019.

Over the years Gelažninkas achieved multiple victories and podium finishes competing in various disciplines in various competitions across the Baltic states, European and World Motocross Championships.

== Career highlights ==
- 1995 - Lithuanian champion 65cc class
- 1996 - Lithuanian champion 80cc class, 2nd place 65cc class
- 1997 - 2nd place in Lithuania 80cc class
- 1998 - Lithuanian champion 80cc class
- 1999 - 2nd in Lithuanian championship 80cc class and 2nd in the Baltic championship.
- 2000 - Team Lithuania member in Motocross of Nations
- 2001 - Lithuanian champion 125cc class
- 2002 - 5th in European youth championship 125cc class, Lithuanian champion 125cc class
- 2003 - 3rd in European youth championship 125cc class
- 2004 - Lithuanian champion 125cc class, 2nd in Open class, European cup 125cc class stage victory, 3rd in Baltics in Open class
- 2005 - 5th in British Masters championship.
- 2011 - Team Lithuania member in Motocross of Nations
- 2013 - Lithuanian champion Cross Country E2 class, 2nd in Enduro E2 class
- 2014 - Lithuanian champion Cross Country E2 class, Lithuanian champion Enduro E2 class, Latvian champion Enduro E2 class, 2nd in Baltic Enduro E2 class
- 2015 - Lithuanian champion Cross Country E2 class, Lithuanian champion Enduro E2 class, 2nd in Baltic Enduro E2 class
- 2016 - Lithuanian champion Enduro E2 class.
- 2017 - Lithuanian champion Enduro E1 class, 3rd in Cross Country E1 class.
- 2018 - Baltic champion in Cross Country Enduro class, Lithuanian champion in Cross Country Enduro class and Enduro E2 class, Baltic Enduro Rally champion, Balkan Off-road Rally champion, 3rd-place finish in Baja Poland rally.
- 2019 - Tuareg Rally champion
- 2021 - Winner of Dakar Rally in Original by Motul category
- 2022 - Winner of Dakar Rally in Original by Motul category

=== Dakar Rally results ===
Year	Class	Starting number	Vehicle	Position
2019	Bike	92	(Austria) KTM RALLY REPLICA	24
2020	Bike	34	(Austria) KTM RALLY REPLICA 2016	30
2021	Bike	30	(Austria) KTM RALLY REPLICA 2020	21
2022	Bike	36	(Sweden) (Austria) Husqvarna 450 Rally Replica	28
2024	SxS (SSV) (as navigator)	426	(Canada) Can-Am Maverick X3	9
2025	Bike	88	(China) Hoto Rally 450	32
