= Josef Macháček =

Czech four-wheeler motorcycle rider

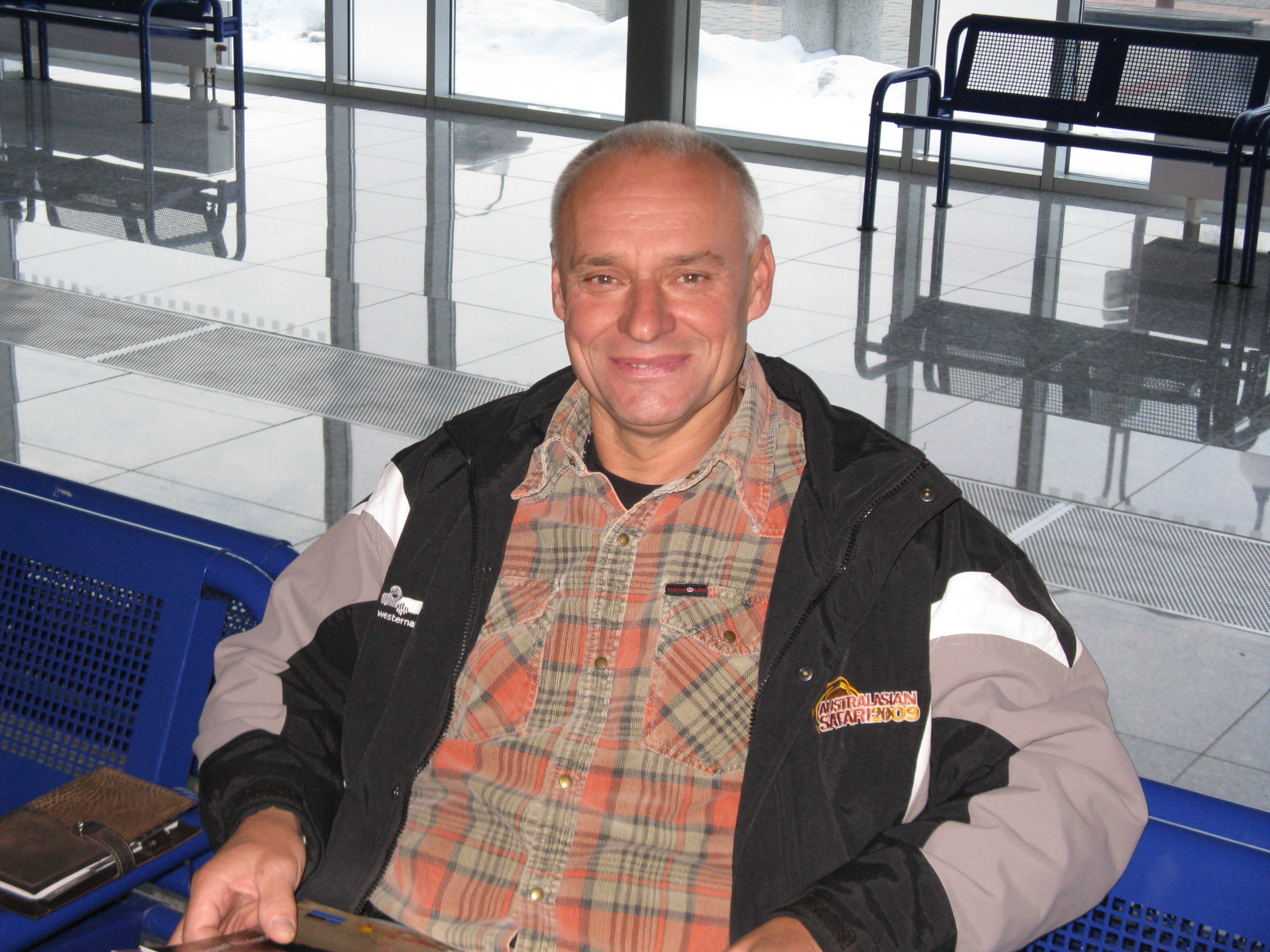
- Nationality: Czech
- Born: 13 March 1957 (age 69) Chrudim, Czechoslovakia
- Teams: Can-Am
- Championships: Dakar Rally
- Wins: 2009, 2021

Josef Macháček (born 13 March 1957) is a Czech four-wheeler motorcycle rider and rally raid driver. He won the 2009 Dakar Rally in the quad category and the 2021 Dakar Rally in the lightweight prototype category, the first rider to do in both categories. He is the oldest winner of Dakar Rally.
