= Giovanni Enrico =

Chilean four-wheeler motorcycle rider

Giovanni Enrico (born 19 June 1987) is a Chilean four-wheeler motorcycle rider who took part in the 2018 Dakar Rally, 2019 Dakar Rally, 2020 Dakar Rally, 2021 Dakar Rally.

Enrico is a multiple-time stage winner in the Dakar Rally, having won Stage 3 in the 2020, and Stage 9 and 11, as well as second place overall in the 2021.
