= Manuel Andújar (motorcyclist) =

Argentine rally raid racer (born 1996)

- Born: 4 June 1996 (age 30) Lobos, Buenos Aires, Argentina
- Teams: Yamaha

Championship titles
- 2021, 2024 2021: Dakar Rally (quad); FIM Cross-Country Rallies World Championship (quad)

Manuel Andújar (born 4 June 1996) is an Argentine rally raid racer who has competed in quads and SSVs. He won the 2021 Dakar Rally in the quad category, winning two stages in the process. He also won the 2021 FIM Cross-Country Rallies World Championship in the quad category, the last rider to do so. Still in the same category, Andújar won the Dakar Rally again in 2024 Dakar Rally, having won three stages and took the lead from stage 4 onwards.

== Career results ==
=== Rally Dakar results ===
Year	Class	Vehicle	Position	Stage wins
2018	Quad	(Japan) Yamaha	29th	
2019	Quad	(Japan) Yamaha	5th	
2020	Quad	(Japan) Yamaha	4th	
2021	Quad	(Japan) Yamaha	1st	2
2022	Quad	(Japan) Yamaha	Ret	3
2023	Quad	(Japan) Yamaha	Ret	3
2024	Quad	(Japan) Yamaha	1st	3
2025	SSV	(Canada) Can-Am	28th	
