= Alexandre Giroud =

French four-wheeler motorcycle rider

- Born: 16 March 1981 (age 45) Grenoble, France
- Nationality: French
- Teams: Yamaha

Championship titles
- 2015 2022–2023 2022: FIM Bajas World Cup; Dakar Rally; World Rally-Raid Championship

Alexandre Giroud (born 16 March 1981) is a French rally raid motorcycle racer in the quad category. He won the Dakar Rally in 2022 and 2023. He also won the 2015 FIM Bajas World Cup and 2022 World Rally-Raid Championship in the quad category.

== Career results ==
=== Rally Dakar results ===
Year	Class	Vehicle	Position	Stage wins
2017	Quad	(Japan) Yamaha	11th	
2018	Quad	(Japan) Yamaha	4th	
2019	Quad	(Japan) Yamaha	4th	
2020	Quad	(Japan) Yamaha	Ret	
2021	Quad	(Japan) Yamaha	Ret	4
2022	Quad	(Japan) Yamaha	1st	2
2023	Quad	(Japan) Yamaha	1st	4
2024	Quad	(Japan) Yamaha	2nd	6
