= Yamaha Raptor 700R =

Yamaha 700R ('Raptor')
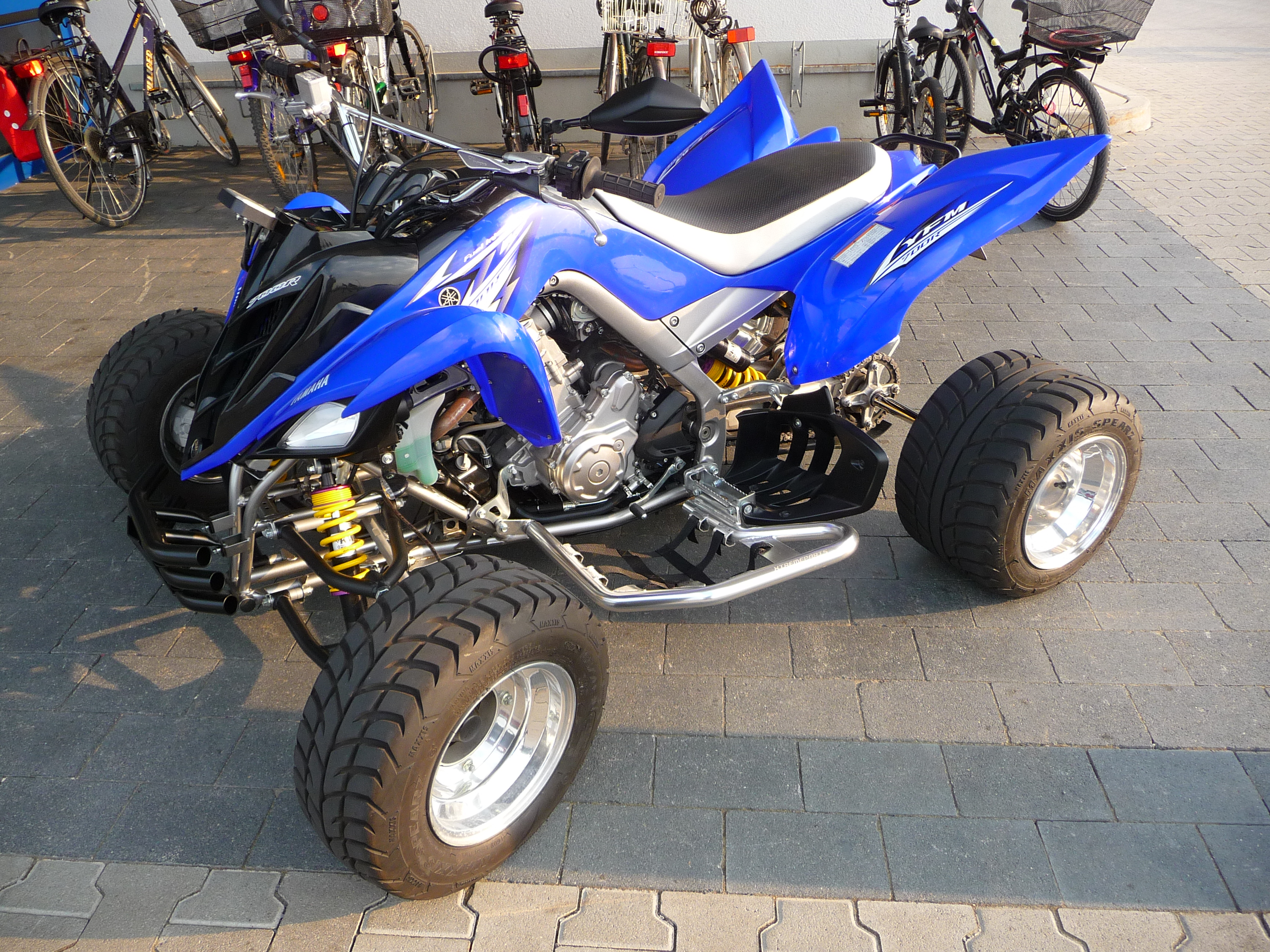

Overview
- Production: 2006–present

Body and chassis
- Related: Yamaha Raptor 660

Dimensions
- Wheelbase: 50.46 in
- Length: 72.8 in
- Width: 46.1 in
- Height: 44.5 in

The Yamaha Raptor 700R is a full-size all terrain vehicle (ATV) or quad bike. The Raptor 700R is Yamaha's second generation of the Raptor (first gen being the Raptor 660) and is powered by a 686cc single cylinder overhead cam electronically fuel injected engine, with electric start and a five-speed manual transmission with a single-speed reverse.

== Specifications ==
| Engine | |
|---|---|
| Type | 686cc liquid-cooled with fan, four-stroke; SOHC, four valves |
| Bore x stroke | 102.0mm x 84mm |
| Compression ratio | 10.0:1 |
| Fuel delivery | Yamaha fuel injection, 45mm |
| Ignition | 32-bit ECU |
| Starting system | Electric |
| Transmission | Five-speed sequential gearbox with a single-speed reverse; multi-plate wet-clutch |
| Drive train | 2WD; sealed O-ring chain, eccentric adjustment |

| Chassis | |
|---|---|
| Front suspension | Independent double-wishbone w/piggy back high-lo-speed compression, rebound and threaded preload adjustment, 9.1-in travel |
| Rear suspension | Cast aluminum swingarm w/rebound, high-lo-speed compression and threaded preload adjustment, 10.1-in travel |
| Brakes, front | Dual ventilated hydraulic discs, twin pistons |
| Brakes, rear | Ventilated hydraulic discs, self-adjusting park brake function |
| Tires F/R | Maxxis AT22 x 7-10 radial / Maxxis AT20 x 10-9 radial |

| Dimensions | |
|---|---|
| L x W x H | 72.6 x 46.5 x 43.9 in |
| Seat height | 32.7” |
| Wheelbase | 50.4” |
| Ground clearance | 4.4” |
| Fuel capacity | 2.9 US gallons |
| Wet weight | 422 pounds |
