= List of Dakar Rally records =

Records broken in Dakar Rally Event

This is a list of records in the Dakar Rally since 1979.

Records are correct as of the 2026 Dakar Rally. Updates are likely to happen during a rally and are subject to change due to the nature of time penalties occurring throughout the rally.

Bold names indicate active as of the most recent rally.

Stage wins for pilots and manufacturers will include any Dakar Experience/joker and prologue stage wins.

== Bike ==
=== Most wins ===
Rank	Rider	Years	Wins
1	(France) Stéphane Peterhansel	1991, 1992, 1993, 1995, 1997, 1998	6
2	(France) Cyril Neveu	1979, 1980, 1982, 1986, 1987	5
2	(France) Cyril Despres	2005, 2007, 2010, 2012, 2013	5
2	(Spain) Marc Coma	2006, 2009, 2011, 2014, 2015	5
5	(Italy) Edi Orioli	1988, 1990, 1994, 1996	4
6	(France) Richard Sainct	1999, 2000, 2003	3
7	(France) Hubert Auriol	1981, 1983	2
7	(Belgium) Gaston Rahier	1984, 1985	2
7	(Italy) Fabrizio Meoni	2001, 2002	2
7	(Australia) Toby Price	2016, 2019	2
7	(United Kingdom) Sam Sunderland	2017, 2022	2
7	(Argentina) Kevin Benavides	2021, 2023	2
7	(United States) **Ricky Brabec**	2020, 2024	2
14	(France) Gilles Lalay	1989	1
14	(Spain) Nani Roma	2004	1
14	(Austria) Matthias Walkner	2018	1
14	(Australia) **Daniel Sanders**	2025	1
14	(Argentina) **Luciano Benavides**	2026	1

=== Most stage wins ===
Rank	Rider	Wins
1	(France) Cyril Despres	33
1	(France) Stéphane Peterhansel	33
3	(Spain) Joan Barreda	29
4	(Spain) Jordi Arcarons	27
5	(France) Hubert Auriol	24
5	(Spain) Marc Coma	24
7	(Italy) Alessandro De Petri	19
8	(Italy) Edi Orioli	17
8	(Belgium) Gaston Rahier	17
10	(Australia) Toby Price	16
11	(France) Richard Sainct	15

=== Most podiums ===
Rank	Rider	Gold medal	Silver medal	Bronze medal	Total
1	(France) Stéphane Peterhansel	6	0	0	6
2	(France) Cyril Despres	5	4	1	10
3	(Spain) Marc Coma	5	2	0	7
4	(France) Cyril Neveu	5	0	0	5
5	(Italy) Edi Orioli	4	1	1	6
6	(France) Richard Sainct	3	1	1	5
7	(United States) **Ricky Brabec**	2	2	0	4
8	(Australia) Toby Price	2	1	3	6
9	(Italy) Fabrizio Meoni	2	1	2	5
10	(France) Hubert Auriol	2	1	0	3
10	(Argentina) Kevin Benavides	2	1	0	3
12	(United Kingdom) Sam Sunderland	2	0	2	4
13	(Belgium) Gaston Rahier	2	0	1	3
14	(France) Gilles Lalay	1	2	1	4
14	(Austria) Matthias Walkner	1	2	1	4
16	(Argentina) **Luciano Benavides**	1	0	0	1
16	(Spain) Nani Roma	1	0	0	1
16	(Australia) **Daniel Sanders**	1	0	0	1
19	(Spain) Jordi Arcarons	0	4	2	6

=== Most stage wins in a single Dakar ===
Rank	Rider	Years	Wins
1	(France) Hubert Auriol	1984	9
2	(France) Stéphane Peterhansel	1997	7
3	(United States) Chuck Stearns	1985	6
3	(France) Stéphane Peterhansel	1989	6
3	(Italy) Alessandro De Petri	1990	6
3	(Spain) Jordi Arcarons	1993, 1994	6
8	(Italy) Alessandro De Petri	1986	5
8	(Austria) Heinz Kinigadner	1995	5
8	(Spain) Marc Coma	2011, 2012	5
8	(Chile) Francisco López Contardo	2013	5
8	(Spain) Joan Barreda	2014	5
8	(Australia) Toby Price	2016	5
8	(Australia) Daniel Sanders	2025	5

=== Wins by manufacturer ===
Rank	Manufacturer	Years	Wins
1	(Austria) **KTM**	2001, 2002, 2003, 2004, 2005, 2006, 2007, 2009, 2010, 2011, 2012, 2013, 2014, 2015, 2016, 2017, 2018, 2019, 2023, 2025, 2026	21
2	(Japan) Yamaha	1979, 1980, 1991, 1992, 1993, 1995, 1996, 1997, 1998	9
3	(Japan) **Honda**	1982, 1986, 1987, 1988, 1989, 2020, 2021, 2024	8
4	(Germany) BMW	1981, 1983, 1984, 1985, 1999, 2000	6
5	(Italy) Cagiva	1990, 1994	2
6	(Spain) **Gas Gas**	2022	1

- Most successful model of bike: KTM 450 Rally with 11 wins in 2011-2019, 2023 and 2025 (12 including the Gas Gas 450 Rally Factory Replica's win in 2022).

=== Stage wins by manufacturer ===
Rank	Manufacturer	Wins
1	(Austria) **KTM**	251
2	(Japan) Yamaha	140
3	(Japan) **Honda**	120
4	(Italy) Cagiva	59
5	(Germany) BMW	49
6	(Sweden) **Husqvarna**	14
7	(Japan) Suzuki	10
8	(France) **Sherco**	6
9	(Italy) Aprilia	5
9	(Spain) **Gas Gas**	5
9	(India) **Hero**	5
12	(Italy) Gilera	3
13	(France) Barigo	2
14	(Japan) Kawasaki	1

=== Wins by nationality ===
Rank	Nationality	Wins
1	France	22
2	Italy	6
2	Spain	6
4	Argentina	3
4	Australia	3
6	Belgium	2
6	United Kingdom	2
6	United States	2
9	Austria	1

=== Combined competitor and make podiums by nationality ===
Rank	Nation	Make	Gold medal	Silver medal	Bronze medal	Total
1	Austria	KTM	22	22	19	63
2	France	Barigo	22	17	17	56
3	Japan	Honda, Suzuki, Yamaha	17	19	20	56
4	Italy	Aprilia, Cagiva	8	8	11	27
5	Spain	Gas Gas	7	11	5	23
6	Germany	BMW	6	2	2	10
7	Australia		3	1	4	8
8	Argentina		3	1	0	4
9	United States		2	3	3	8
10	United Kingdom		2	0	2	4
11	Belgium		2	0	1	3
12	Chile		0	2	4	6
13	Portugal		0	2	2	4
14	South Africa		0	1	2	3
14	Sweden	Husqvarna	0	1	2	3
16	Botswana		0	1	0	1
16	India	Hero	0	1	0	1
16	Norway		0	1	0	1
16	Slovakia		0	1	0	1

== Quad ==
2009 - 2024

=== Most wins ===
Rank	Rider	Years	Wins
1	(Argentina) Marcos Patronelli	2010, 2013, 2016	3
1	(Chile) Ignacio Casale	2014, 2018, 2020	3
3	(Argentina) Alejandro Patronelli	2011, 2012	2
3	(France) Alexandre Giroud	2022, 2023	2
3	(Argentina) Manuel Andújar	2021, 2024	2
6	(Czech Republic) Josef Macháček	2009	1
6	(Poland) Rafał Sonik	2015	1
6	(Russia) Sergey Karyakin	2017	1
6	(Argentina) Nicolás Cavigliasso	2019	1

=== Most stage wins ===
Rank	Rider	Wins
1	(Chile) Ignacio Casale	23
2	(Argentina) Marcos Patronelli	21
3	(France) Alexandre Giroud	16
4	(Argentina) Nicolás Cavigliasso	13
5	(Brazil) Marcelo Medeiros	11
5	(Argentina) Manuel Andújar	11
7	(Argentina) Alejandro Patronelli	10
8	(France) Christophe Declerck	8
9	(United States) Pablo Copetti	7
10	(Argentina) Tomas Maffei	6
10	(Poland) Rafał Sonik	6
12	(Czech Republic) Josef Macháček	5
12	(Russia) Sergey Karyakin	5
14	(Argentina) Sebastian Halpern	4
14	(Argentina) Jeremías González Ferioli	4

=== Most podiums ===
Rank	Rider	Gold medal	Silver medal	Bronze medal	Total
1	(Chile) Ignacio Casale	3	2	0	5
1	(Argentina) Marcos Patronelli	3	2	0	5
3	(Argentina) Alejandro Patronelli	2	2	0	4
4	(France) Alexandre Giroud	2	1	0	3
5	(Argentina) Manuel Andújar	2	0	0	2
6	(Poland) Rafał Sonik	1	1	3	5
7	(Argentina) Nicolás Cavigliasso	1	1	0	2
8	(Czech Republic) Josef Macháček	1	0	0	1
8	(Russia) Sergey Karyakin	1	0	0	1
10	(Argentina) Jeremías González	0	2	1	3

=== Most stage wins in a single Dakar ===
Rank	Rider	Years	Wins
1	(Argentina) Nicolás Cavigliasso	2019	9
2	(Chile) Ignacio Casale	2014	7
3	(France) Alexandre Giroud	2024	6
4	(Argentina) Alejandro Patronelli	2011	5
5	(Czech Republic) Josef Macháček	2009	4
5	(Argentina) Marcos Patronelli	2010, 2012, 2013	4
5	(Argentina) Tomas Maffei	2012	4
5	(Chile) Ignacio Casale	2018, 2020	4
5	(France) Alexandre Giroud	2021, 2023	4
5	(Brazil) Marcelo Medeiros	2023	4

=== Wins by manufacturer ===
Rank	Manufacturer	Years	Wins
1	(Japan) Yamaha	2009, 2010, 2011, 2012, 2013, 2014, 2015, 2016, 2017, 2018, 2019, 2020, 2021, 2022, 2023, 2024	16

- Most successful model of quad: Yamaha Raptor 700R with 16 wins

=== Stage wins by manufacturer ===
Rank	Manufacturer	Wins
1	(Japan) Yamaha	179
2	(Japan) Honda	10
3	(United States) Polaris	5
3	(Canada) Can-Am	5
5	(Germany) E-ATV	3
6	(Japan) Suzuki	1
6	(Netherlands) Barren	1

=== Wins by nationality ===
Rank	Nationality	Wins
1	Argentina	8
2	Chile	3
3	France	2
4	Czech Republic	1
4	Poland	1
4	Russia	1

=== Combined competitor and make podiums by nationality ===
Rank	Nation	Make	Gold medal	Silver medal	Bronze medal	Total
1	Japan	Honda, Yamaha	16	15	16	47
2	Argentina		8	10	4	22
3	Chile		3	3	0	6
4	France		2	2	0	4
5	Poland		1	1	5	7
6	Czech Republic		1	0	0	1
6	Russia		1	0	0	1
8	Canada	Can-Am	0	1	0	1
9	United States		0	0	2	2
10	Bolivia		0	0	1	1
10	Netherlands		0	0	1	1
10	Slovakia		0	0	1	1
10	South Africa		0	0	1	1
10	Spain		0	0	1	1

== Car ==
=== Most wins ===
Rank	Driver	Years	Wins
1	(France) **Stéphane Peterhansel**	2004, 2005, 2007, 2012, 2013, 2016, 2017, 2021	8
2	(Qatar) **Nasser Al-Attiyah**	2011, 2015, 2019, 2022, 2023, 2026	6
3	(Finland) Ari Vatanen	1987, 1989, 1990, 1991	4
3	(Spain) **Carlos Sainz**	2010, 2018, 2020, 2024	4
5	(France) René Metge	1981, 1984, 1986	3
5	(France) Pierre Lartigue	1994, 1995, 1996	3
7	(France) Jean-Louis Schlesser	1999, 2000	2
7	(Japan) Hiroshi Masuoka	2002, 2003	2
9	(France) Alain Génestier	1979	1
9	(Sweden) Freddy Kottulinsky	1980	1
9	(France) Claude Marreau	1982	1
9	(Belgium) Jacky Ickx	1983	1
9	(France) Patrick Zaniroli	1985	1
9	(Finland) Juha Kankkunen	1988	1
9	(France) Hubert Auriol	1992	1
9	(France) Bruno Saby	1993	1
9	(Japan) Kenjiro Shinozuka	1997	1
9	(France) Jean-Pierre Fontenay	1998	1
9	(Germany) Jutta Kleinschmidt	2001	1
9	(France) Luc Alphand	2006	1
9	(South Africa) Giniel de Villiers	2009	1
9	(Spain) **Nani Roma**	2014	1
9	(Saudi Arabia) **Yazeed Al-Rajhi**	2025	1

=== Most stage wins ===
Rank	Driver	Wins
1	(Finland) Ari Vatanen	50
1	(France) **Stéphane Peterhansel**	50
1	(Qatar) **Nasser Al-Attiyah**	50
4	(Spain) **Carlos Sainz**	42
5	(Belgium) Jacky Ickx	29
6	(France) **Sébastien Loeb**	28
7	(Japan) Hiroshi Masuoka	25
8	(France) Jean-Pierre Fontenay	24
9	(France) Pierre Lartigue	21
9	(Japan) Kenjiro Shinozuka	21
11	(South Africa) Giniel de Villiers	18
12	(France) Bruno Saby	15
12	(France) Jean-Louis Schlesser	15

=== Most podiums ===
Rank	Driver	Gold medal	Silver medal	Bronze medal	Total
1	(France) **Stéphane Peterhansel**	8	2	2	12
2	(Qatar) **Nasser Al-Attiyah**	6	5	1	12
3	(Spain) **Carlos Sainz**	4	0	2	6
4	(Finland) Ari Vatanen	4	0	0	4
5	(France) Pierre Lartigue	3	2	1	6
6	(France) René Metge	3	0	0	3
7	(Japan) Hiroshi Masuoka	2	2	0	4
8	(France) Jean-Louis Schlesser	2	0	3	5
9	(South Africa) Giniel de Villiers	1	4	3	8
10	(Japan) Kenjiro Shinozuka	1	2	4	7
11	(France) Sebastien Loeb	0	3	2	5

=== Most stage wins in a single Dakar ===
Rank	Driver	Years	Wins
1	(France) Pierre Lartigue	1994	10
2	(Belgium) Jacky Ickx	1984	9
3	(Belgium) Jacky Ickx	1982	7
3	(Finland) Ari Vatanen	1989, 1990, 1992, 1996	7
3	(France) Jean-Louis Schlesser	2001	7
3	(Spain) **Carlos Sainz**	2011	7
3	(France) **Sébastien Loeb**	2023	7
11	(France) Patrick Zaniroli	1986	6
11	(Kenya) **Shekhar Mehta**	1987	6
11	(France) **Hubert Auriol**	1994	6
11	(France) **Stéphane Peterhansel**	2003	6
11	(Spain) **Carlos Sainz**	2009	6
11	(Qatar) **Nasser Al-Attiyah**	2021	6
17	(Belgium) Jacky Ickx	1983	5
17	(France) **André Trossat**	1983	5
17	(Sweden) **Kenneth Eriksson**	1991	5
17	(Finland) Ari Vatanen	1991	5
17	(France) Jean-Pierre Fontenay	1997, 1998	5
17	(Japan) **Hiroshi Masuoka**	2001, 2002	5
17	(Spain) **Carlos Sainz**	2007	5
17	(Qatar) **Nasser Al-Attiyah**	2015	5
17	(France) **Sébastien Loeb**	2017, 2024	5

=== Wins by manufacturer ===
Rank	Manufacturer	Years	Wins
1	(Japan) Mitsubishi	1985, 1992, 1993, 1997, 1998, 2001, 2002, 2003, 2004, 2005, 2006, 2007	12
2	(France) Peugeot	1987, 1988, 1989, 1990, 2016, 2017, 2018	7
3	(United Kingdom) **Mini**	2012, 2013, 2014, 2015, 2020, 2021	6
4	(France) Citroën	1991, 1994, 1995, 1996	4
4	(Germany) **Volkswagen**	1980, 2009, 2010, 2011	4
4	(Japan) **Toyota**	2019, 2022, 2023, 2025	4
7	(United Kingdom) Range Rover	1979, 1981	2
7	(Germany) Porsche	1984, 1986	2
7	(France) Schlesser	1999, 2000	2
10	(France) Renault	1982	1
10	(Germany) Mercedes	1983	1
10	(Germany) Audi	2024	1
10	(Romania) Dacia	2026	1

- Most successful model of car: Mitsubishi Pajero Evolution with 12 wins

=== Stage wins by manufacturer ===
Rank	Manufacturer	Wins
1	(Japan) Mitsubishi	150
2	(France) Peugeot	78
3	(France) Citroën	59
4	(Germany) **Volkswagen**	57
5	(Japan) **Toyota**	52
6	(United Kingdom) **Mini**	44
7	(United Kingdom) Range Rover	34
8	(France) Schlesser	30
9	(Japan) **Nissan**	21
9	(Germany) Porsche	21
11	(Russia) Lada	18
11	(United Kingdom) Prodrive (Note: Includes stage wins under BRX)	18
13	(Germany) Mercedes-Benz	17
14	(Germany) BMW	13
15	(Germany) Audi	12
16	(United States) Hummer	9
17	(France) Renault	8
18	(United States) **Ford**	6
19	(Germany) Opel	5
20	(Romania) **Dacia**	3
21	(United Kingdom) **Land Rover**	2
21	(France) Aixam-Mega	2
21	(Spain) SEAT	2
21	(France) Red Bull/SMG	2
21	(South Africa) **Century**	2
26	(Italy) Fiat	1
26	(China) Haval	1
26	(Japan) Subaru	1
26	(France) Gordini	1

=== Wins by nationality ===
Rank	Nationality	Wins
1	France	23
2	Qatar	6
3	Finland	5
3	Spain	5
5	Japan	3
6	Germany	2
7	Belgium	1
7	Saudi Arabia	1
7	South Africa	1

=== Combined competitor and make podiums by nationality ===
Rank	Nation	Make	Gold medal	Silver medal	Bronze medal	Total
1	France	Bourgoin, Citroën, Cotel, Mega, Peugeot, Renault, Schlesser	37	30	33	100
2	Japan	Mitsubishi, Toyota	19	25	25	69
3	Germany	Audi, Mercedes, Porsche, Volkswagen	9	8	6	23
4	United Kingdom	Mini, Prodrive, Range Rover	8	9	9	26
5	Qatar		6	5	1	12
6	Spain		5	4	3	12
7	Finland		5	0	0	5
8	South Africa		1	5	3	9
9	Belgium		1	3	0	4
10	Sweden		1	1	2	4
11	Saudi Arabia		1	0	1	2
12	Romania	Dacia	1	0	0	1
13	United States	Ford, Hummer	0	2	5	7
14	Russia	Lada	0	2	2	4
15	Italy	Fiat	0	0	2	2
16	Brazil		0	0	1	1
16	Poland		0	0	1	1

== Stock ==
Since 2026

=== Most wins ===
Rank	Driver	Years	Wins
1	(Lithuania) **Rokas Baciuška**	2026	1

=== Most stage wins ===
Rank	Driver	Wins
1	(Lithuania) **Rokas Baciuška**	7
2	(United States) **Sara Price**	4
3	(France) **Stéphane Peterhansel**	3

=== Stage wins in a single Dakar ===
Rank	Driver	Year	Wins
1	(Lithuania) **Rokas Baciuška**	2026	7
2	(United States) **Sara Price**	2026	4
3	(France) **Stéphane Peterhansel**	2026	3

=== Most podiums ===
Rank	Driver	Gold medal	Silver medal	Bronze medal	Total
1	(Lithuania) **Rokas Baciuška**	1	0	0	1
2	(United States) **Sara Price**	0	1	0	1
3	(France) **Ronald Basso**	0	0	1	1

=== Wins by manufacturer ===
Rank	Manufacturer	Years	Wins
1	(United Kingdom) **Land Rover**	2026	1

=== Stage wins by manufacturer ===
Rank	Manufacturer	Wins
1	(United Kingdom) **Land Rover**	14

=== Wins by nationality ===
Rank	Nationality	Wins
1	Lithuania	1

=== Combined competitor and make podiums by nationality ===
Rank	Nation	Make	Gold medal	Silver medal	Bronze medal	Total
1	United Kingdom	Land Rover	1	1	0	2
2	Lithuania		1	0	0	1
3	United States		0	1	0	1
4	France		0	0	1	1
4	Japan	Toyota	0	0	1	1

== Lightweight ==
Since 2017 SSVs became a separate class from the cars.

Since 2021 the Lightweight class was further separated into T3 Lightweight Prototype and T4 Modified Production SSV.

For 2021 all Lightweights were under a single entry list but had separate general classifications. T3s had entry numbers from 380 to 399 and T4s had 400 to 454.

== T3 Lightweight Prototype ==
Since 2021

=== Most wins ===
Rank	Driver	Years	Wins
1	(Czech Republic) Josef Macháček	2021	1
1	(Chile) Francisco López Contardo	2022	1
1	(United States) Austin Jones	2023	1
1	(Spain) Cristina Gutiérrez	2024	1
1	(Argentina) **Nicolás Cavigliasso**	2025	1
1	(Spain) **Pau Navarro**	2026	1

=== Most stage wins ===
Rank	Driver	Wins
1	(United States) Seth Quintero	20
2	(United States) Mitch Guthrie	8
3	(Argentina) **Nicolás Cavigliasso**	7
4	(Spain) Cristina Gutiérrez	6
5	(Netherlands) **Paul Spierings**	5
6	(United Kingdom) Kris Meeke	4
7	(Argentina) **Kevin Benavides**	3
7	(Saudi Arabia) **Yasir Seaidan**	3
7	(Argentina) **David Zille**	3

=== Wins by co-driver ===
Rank	Co-driver	Years	Wins
1	(Czech Republic) Pavel Vyoral	2021	1
1	(Chile) Juan Pablo Latrach	2022	1
1	(Brazil) Gustavo Gugelmin	2023	1
1	(Spain) Pablo Moreno Huete	2024	1
1	(Argentina) **Valentina Pertegarini**	2025	1
1	(Spain) **Jan Rosa**	2026	1

=== Most podiums ===
Rank	Driver	Gold medal	Silver medal	Bronze medal	Total
1	(Argentina) **Nicolás Cavigliasso**	1	0	1	2
1	(Spain) Cristina Gutiérrez	1	0	1	2
1	(Spain) **Pau Navarro**	1	0	1	2
4	(Chile) Francisco Lopez Contardo	1	0	0	1
4	(United States) Austin Jones	1	0	0	1
4	(Czech Republic) Josef Macháček	1	0	0	1
7	(Sweden) Sebastian Eriksson	0	1	0	1
7	(Portugal) Gonçalo Guerreiro	0	1	0	1
7	(United States) Mitch Guthrie	0	1	0	1
7	(Italy) Camelia Liparoti	0	1	0	1
7	(United States) Seth Quintero	0	1	0	1
7	(Saudi Arabia) **Yasir Seaidan**	0	1	0	1
13	(Lithuania) Rokas Baciuška	0	0	1	1
13	(Belgium) Guillaume De Mévius	0	0	1	1
13	(France) Philippe Pinchedez	0	0	1	1

=== Stage wins in a single Dakar ===
Rank	Driver	Years	Wins
1	(United States) Seth Quintero	2022	12
2	(United States) Seth Quintero	2021	6
3	(United States) Mitch Guthrie	2023	5
4	(United Kingdom) Kris Meeke	2021	4
5	(Spain) Cristina Gutiérrez	2021	3
5	(United States) Mitch Guthrie	2024	3
5	(Argentina) **Nicolás Cavigliasso**	2025	3
5	(Saudi Arabia) **Yasir Seaidan**	2025	3
5	(Argentina) **Kevin Benavides**	2026	3
5	(Netherlands) **Paul Spierings**	2026	3

=== Wins by manufacturer ===
Rank	Manufacturer	Years	Wins
1	(Canada) **Can-Am**	2021, 2022, 2023	3
1	(Netherlands) **Taurus**	2024, 2025, 2026	3

=== Stage wins by manufacturer ===
Rank	Manufacturer	Wins
1	(Netherlands) **Taurus**	35
2	(Belgium) OT3	24
3	(Canada) **Can-Am**	8
4	(France) MCE-5	5
5	(France) **PH Sport**	4
6	(Japan) Yamaha	3
7	(Belgium) **GRallyTeam**	2

=== Wins by nationality ===
Rank	Nationality	Wins
1	Spain	2
2	Argentina	1
2	Chile	1
2	Czech Republic	1
2	United States	1

=== Combined competitor and make podiums by nationality ===
Rank	Nation	Make	Gold medal	Silver medal	Bronze medal	Total
1	Canada	Can-Am	3	3	1	7
2	Netherlands	Taurus	3	2	2	7
3	Spain		2	0	2	4
4	United States		1	2	0	3
5	Argentina		1	0	1	2
6	Chile		1	0	0	1
6	Czech Republic		1	0	0	1
8	Italy		0	1	0	1
8	Japan	Yamaha	0	1	0	1
8	Portugal		0	1	0	1
8	Saudi Arabia		0	1	0	1
8	Sweden		0	1	0	1
13	Belgium	OT3	0	0	3	3
14	France	Pinch Racing	0	0	2	2
15	Lithuania		0	0	1	1

== T4 Modified Production SSV ==
=== Most wins ===
Rank	Driver	Years	Wins
1	(Chile) Francisco López Contardo	2019, 2021	2
1	(United States) Brock Heger	2025, 2026	2
2	(Brazil) Leandro Torres	2017	1
2	(Brazil) Reinaldo Varela	2018	1
2	(United States) Casey Currie	2020	1
2	(United States) Austin Jones	2022	1
2	(Poland) Eryk Goczał	2023	1
2	(France) Xavier de Soultrait	2024	1

=== Most stage wins ===
Rank	Driver	Wins
1	(Chile) Francisco López Contardo	17
2	(Brazil) Reinaldo Varela	12
3	(Poland) Marek Goczał	8
4	(Spain) Gerard Farrés	6
5	(France) Patrice Garrouste	5
5	(Lithuania) Rokas Baciuška	5
7	(Russia) Ravil Maganov	4
7	(Poland) Eryk Goczał	4
7	(France) Xavier de Soultrait	4
10	(United States) Mitchell Guthrie	3
10	(Poland) Michał Goczał	3
10	(Portugal) João Ferreira	3
10	(Argentina) Jeremías González Ferioli	3
10	(United States) Sara Price	3

=== Wins by co-driver ===
Rank	Co-driver	Years	Wins
1	(Brazil) Gustavo Gugelmin	2018, 2022	2
1	(United States) Max Eddy	2025, 2026	2
2	(Brazil) Lourival Roldan	2017	1
2	(Chile) Alvaro Juan Leon Quintanilla	2019	1
2	(United States) Sean Berriman	2020	1
2	(Chile) Juan Pablo Latrach Vinagre	2021	1
2	(Spain) Oriol Mena	2023	1
2	(France) Martin Bonnet	2024	1

=== Most podiums ===
Rank	Driver	Gold medal	Silver medal	Bronze medal	Total
1	(Chile) Francisco López Contardo	2	0	1	3
2	(United States) Austin Jones	1	1	0	2
3	(Brazil) Reinaldo Varela	1	0	1	2
4	(Brazil) Leandro Torres	1	0	0	1
4	(United States) Casey Currie	1	0	0	1
4	(Poland) Eryk Goczał	1	0	0	1
4	(France) Xavier de Soultrait	1	0	0	1
4	(United States) Brock Heger	1	0	0	1
9	(Spain) Gerard Farrés	0	2	0	2
10	(China) Wang Fujiang	0	1	0	1
10	(France) Patrice Garrouste	0	1	0	1
10	(Russia) Sergey Karyakin	0	1	0	1
10	(Lithuania) Rokas Baciuška	0	1	0	1
10	(Switzerland) Jérôme de Sadeleer	0	1	0	1

=== Stage wins in a single Dakar ===
Rank	Driver	Years	Wins
1	(Poland) Marek Goczał	2022	6
2	(Chile) Francisco López Contardo	2025	5
3	(Brazil) Reinaldo Varela	2018	5
3	(France) Patrice Garrouste	2018	5
3	(Chile) Francisco López Contardo	2021	5
6	(Chile) Francisco López Contardo	2019	4
6	(Russia) Ravil Maganov	2019	4
6	(Poland) Eryk Goczał	2023	4

=== Wins by manufacturer ===
Rank	Manufacturer	Years	Wins
1	(Canada) Can-Am	2018, 2019, 2020, 2021, 2022, 2023	6
2	(United States) Polaris	2017, 2024, 2025, 2026	4

- Most successful model of UTV: Can-Am Maverick with 6 wins

=== Stage wins by manufacturer ===
Rank	Manufacturer	Wins
1	(Canada) Can-Am	86
2	(United States) Polaris	31
3	(Belgium) OT3	5
4	(Canada) BRP	1

=== Wins by nationality ===
Rank	Nationality	Wins
1	United States	4
2	Brazil	2
2	Chile	2
4	France	1
4	Poland	1

=== Combined competitor and make podiums by nationality ===
Rank	Nation	Make	Gold medal	Silver medal	Bronze medal	Total
1	Canada	Can-Am	6	6	6	18
2	United States	Polaris	4	3	2	9
3	Brazil		3	1	1	5
4	Chile		2	0	1	3
5	Spain		1	3	1	5
6	France		1	1	1	3
7	Poland		1	0	3	4
8	Switzerland		0	2	0	2
9	Lithuania		0	1	1	2
9	Russia		0	1	1	2
11	China		0	1	0	1

== Truck ==
=== Most wins ===
Rank	Driver	Years	Wins
1	(Russia) Vladimir Chagin	2000, 2002, 2003, 2004, 2006, 2010, 2011	7
2	(Czech Republic) Karel Loprais	1988, 1994, 1995, 1998, 1999, 2001	6
3	(Russia) Eduard Nikolaev	2013, 2017, 2018, 2019	4
4	(France) Georges Groine	1982, 1983	2
4	(Italy) Francesco Perlini	1992, 1993	2
4	(Russia) Firdaus Kabirov	2005, 2009	2
4	(Netherlands) Gerard de Rooy	2012, 2016	2
4	(Russia) Andrey Karginov	2014, 2020	2
4	(Russia) Dmitry Sotnikov	2021, 2022	2
4	(Czech Republic) **Martin Macík**	2024, 2025	2

=== Most stage wins ===
(Since 1999)

Rank	Driver	Wins
1	(Russia) Vladimir Chagin	63
2	(Russia) Firdaus Kabirov	37
3	(Netherlands) Gérard de Rooy	33
4	(Russia) Eduard Nikolaev	24
5	(Russia) Andrey Karginov	21
6	(Netherlands) Hans Stacey	18
7	(Czech Republic) **Aleš Loprais**	17
8	(Czech Republic) **Martin Macík**	16
8	(Czech Republic) Karel Loprais	16
10	(Russia) Dmitry Sotnikov	15

=== Most podiums ===
Rank	Driver	Gold medal	Silver medal	Bronze medal	Total
1	(Russia) Vladimir Chagin	7	1	0	8
2	(Czech Republic) Karel Loprais	6	4	1	11
3	(Russia) Eduard Nikolaev	4	2	2	8
4	(Russia) Firdaus Kabirov	2	3	2	7
5	(Russia) Dmitry Sotnikov	2	2	0	4
6	(Netherlands) Gerard de Rooy	2	1	3	6
7	(Czech Republic) **Martin Macík**	2	1	0	3
8	(Russia) Andrey Karginov	2	0	2	4
9	(France) Georges Groine	2	0	1	3
10	(Italy) Francesco Perlini	2	0	0	2

=== Stage wins in a single Dakar ===
(since 1999)

Rank	Driver	Wins	Wins
1	(Russia) Vladimir Chagin	2010	9
2	(Czech Republic) Karel Loprais	2001	8
3	(Russia) Vladimir Chagin	2002, 2006, 2011	7
4	(Russia) Firdaus Kabirov	2004	6
4	(Netherlands) Gerard de Rooy	2013	6
4	(Russia) Eduard Nikolaev	2015	6
4	(Czech Republic) **Martin Macík**	2023	6
8	(Russia) Vladimir Chagin	2001	5
8	(Netherlands) Hans Stacey	2007	5
8	(Russia) Dmitry Sotnikov	2021, 2022	5
8	(Czech Republic) **Aleš Loprais**	2025	5
8	(Czech Republic) **Martin Macík**	2025	5

=== Wins by manufacturer ===
Rank	Manufacturer	Years	Wins
1	(Russia) Kamaz	1996, 2000, 2002, 2003, 2004, 2005, 2006, 2009, 2010, 2011, 2013, 2014, 2015, 2017, 2018, 2019, 2020, 2021, 2022	19
2	(Czech Republic) **Tatra**	1988, 1994, 1995, 1998, 1999, 2001	6
2	(Italy) **Iveco**	2012, 2016, 2023, 2024, 2025, 2026	6
4	(Germany) Mercedes-Benz	1982, 1983, 1984, 1985, 1986	5
5	(Italy) Perlini	1990, 1991, 1992, 1993	4
6	(Algeria) Sonacome	1980	1
6	(France) ALM/Acmat	1981	1
6	(Netherlands) **DAF**	1987	1
6	(Japan) **Hino**	1997	1
6	(Germany) **MAN**	2007	1

- Most successful model of truck: Tatra 815 with 6 wins

=== Stage wins by manufacturer ===
(since 1997)

Rank	Manufacturer	Wins
1	(Russia) Kamaz	178
2	(Italy) **Iveco**	84
3	(Czech Republic) **Tatra**	43
4	(Germany) **MAN**	22
5	(Netherlands) **DAF**	16
6	(Japan) **Hino**	15
7	(Netherlands) GINAF	8
8	(France) **Renault**	7
9	(Japan) Mitsubishi	6
10	(Czech Republic) Praga	4
10	(Belarus) MAZ	4
12	(Germany) Mercedes-Benz	3

=== Wins by nationality ===
Rank	Nationality	Wins
1	Russia	19
2	Czech Republic	8
3	France	5
3	Netherlands	5
5	Italy	4
6	Algeria	1
6	Austria	1
6	Germany	1
6	Lithuania	1

=== Combined competitor and make podiums by nationality ===
Rank	Nation	Make	Gold medal	Silver medal	Bronze medal	Total
1	Russia	Kamaz	19	14	11	44
2	Italy	Iveco, Perlini	9	5	6	20
3	Czech Republic	Tatra	7	8	8	23
4	France	ALM-ACMAT, UNIC	6	8	4	18
5	Germany	MAN	6	5	6	17
6	Netherlands	DAF, GINAF	5	4	9	18
7	Poland		3	0	0	3
8	Belgium		2	2	4	8
9	Japan	Hino	1	6	2	9
10	Spain		1	0	3	4
11	Algeria	Sonacome	1	0	1	2
11	Russian Automobile Federation		1	0	1	2
13	Austria	Pinzgauer	1	0	0	1
14	Brazil		0	2	1	3
15	Belarus	MAZ	0	1	1	2
16	Sweden	Volvo	0	1	0	1
16	United States	Ford	0	1	0	1
18	Kazakhstan		0	0	2	2
19	Argentina		0	0	1	1
19	Estonia		0	0	1	1

== Classic ==
Since 2021

=== Most wins ===
Rank	Driver	Years	Wins
1	(Spain) Carlos Santaolalla	2024, 2025	2
2	(France) Marc Douton	2021	1
2	(France) Serge Mogno	2022	1
2	(Spain) Juan Morera	2023	1
2	(Lithuania) Karolis Raišys	2026	1

=== Most stage wins ===
Rank	Driver	Wins
1	(Spain) Carlos Santaolalla	9
2	(France) Marc Douton	7
3	(Spain) Xavier Piña Garnatcha	4
3	(Switzerland) Urbano Alfonso Gherardo Clerici	4
3	(Spain) Juan Morera	4
6	(Spain) Kilian Revuelta	3
6	(Czech Republic) Ondřej Klymčiw	3
6	(Italy) Lorenzo Traglio	3
9	(Spain) Jesus Fuster Pliego	2
9	(France) Jerome Galpin	2

=== Fewest points at finish ===
Rank	Driver	Years	Points
1	(France) Serge Mogno	2022	399
2	(Spain) Juan Morera	2023	428
3	(Spain) Carlos Santaolalla	2023	529
4	(France) Arnaud Euvrard	2022	602
5	(Italy) Paolo Bedeschi	2023	631
6	(Spain) Jesus Fuster Pliego	2022	701
7	(France) Jerome Galpin	2022	803
8	(Italy) Riccardo Garosci	2023	813
9	(Spain) Carlos Santaolalla	2024	820
10	(Italy) Lorenzo Traglio	2024	832

=== Most podiums ===
Rank	Driver	Gold medal	Silver medal	Bronze medal	Total
1	(Spain) Carlos Santaolalla	1	1	0	2
2	(France) Marc Douton	1	0	0	1
2	(France) Serge Mogno	1	0	0	1
2	(Spain) Juan Morera	1	0	0	1
5	(Spain) Juan Donatiu	0	1	0	1
5	(France) Arnaud Euvrard	0	1	0	1
5	(Italy) Lorenzo Traglio	0	1	0	1
8	(Italy) Paolo Bedeschi	0	0	2	2
9	(France) Lilian Harichoury	0	0	1	1

=== Most stage wins in a single Dakar ===
Rank	Driver	Years	Wins
1	(Spain) Carlos Santaolalla	2025	8
2	(Spain) Carlos Santaolalla	2024	7
3	(France) Marc Douton	2021	6
3	(Lithuania) Karolis Raišys	2026	6
5	(Spain) Xavier Piña Garnatcha	2022	4
5	(Switzerland) Urbano Alfonso Gherardo Clerici	2023	4
7	(Italy) Lorenzo Traglio	2024	3

=== Wins by manufacturer ===
Rank	Manufacturer	Years	Wins
1	(Japan) Toyota	2022, 2023, 2024, 2025	4
2	(France) Sunhill	2021	1
2	(United Kingdom) Land Rover	2026	1

=== Stage wins by manufacturer ===
Rank	Manufacturer	Wins
1	(Japan) Toyota	21
2	(Japan) Nissan	8
3	(France) Sunhill	6
4	(Germany) Mercedes-Benz	3
4	(France) Protruck	3
4	(Czech Republic) Škoda	3
7	(Germany) Porsche	2
8	(France) Renault	1
8	(Japan) Mitsubishi	1

=== Wins by nationality ===
Rank	Nationality	Wins
1	Spain	3
2	France	2
3	Lithuania	1

=== Combined competitor and make podiums by nationality ===
Rank	Nation	Make	Gold medal	Silver medal	Bronze medal	Total
1	Japan	Mitsubishi, Toyota	3	3	2	8
2	France	Renault, Sunhill	3	1	2	6
3	Spain		2	2	1	5
4	Italy		0	1	2	3
5	Germany	Mercedes-Benz	0	1	1	2

== Mission 1000 ==
Since 2024

=== Most wins ===
Rank	Driver	Years	Wins
1	(Spain) **Jordi Juvanteny**	2024, 2025, 2026	3

=== Most stage wins ===
Rank	Driver	Wins
1	(Spain) **Jordi Juvanteny**	18
2	(Argentina) **Benjamín Pascual**	8
3	(China) Wenmin Su	3
4	(Japan) Yoshio Ikemachi	2
4	(Spain) **Fran Gómez Pallas**	2
4	(France) Jean-Michel Paulhe	2
7	(France) Sylvain Espinasse	1
7	(France) Willy Jobard	1
7	(Spain) **Esther Merino**	1

=== Most points at finish ===
Rank	Driver	Years	Points
1	(Spain) **Jordi Juvanteny**	2025	249
2	(Spain) **Jordi Juvanteny**	2026	237
3	(Japan) Yoshio Ikemachi	2025	235
4	(Spain) **Fran Gómez Pallas**	2026	231
5	(Argentina) **Benjamín Pascual**	2026	209
6	(Spain) **Esther Merino**	2026	208
7	(Spain) **Miguel Puertas**	2026	200
8	(China) **Yi Guanghui**	2026	197
9	(Argentina) **Benjamín Pascual**	2025	195
10	(China) **Jie Yang**	2026	193

=== Most podiums ===
Rank	Driver	Gold medal	Silver medal	Bronze medal	Total
1	(Spain) **Jordi Juvanteny**	3	0	0	3
2	(Japan) Yoshio Ikemachi	0	1	0	1
2	(Spain) **Fran Gómez Pallas**	0	1	0	1
2	(France) Jean-Michel Paulhe	0	1	0	1
5	(Argentina) **Benjamín Pascual**	0	0	2	2
6	(China) Wenmin Su	0	0	1	1

=== Most stage wins in a single Dakar ===
Rank	Driver	Years	Wins
1	(Spain) **Jordi Juvanteny**	2025	9
2	(Argentina) **Benjamín Pascual**	2026	6
3	(Spain) **Jordi Juvanteny**	2026	5
4	(Spain) **Jordi Juvanteny**	2024	4
5	(China) Wenmin Su	2024	3

=== Wins by manufacturer ===
Rank	Manufacturer	Years	Wins
1	(Germany) **MAN**	2024, 2025, 2026	3

=== Stage wins by manufacturer ===
Rank	Manufacturer	Wins
1	(Germany) **MAN**	18
2	(China) **Segway**	8
3	(China) **Arctic Leopard**	7
4	(Canada) Can-Am	2
4	(Japan) HySE	2
6	(Italy) Tacita	1

=== Wins by nationality ===
Rank	Nationality	Wins
1	Spain	3

=== Combined competitor and make podiums by nationality ===
Rank	Nation	Make	Gold medal	Silver medal	Bronze medal	Total
1	Spain		3	1	0	4
2	Germany	MAN	3	0	0	3
3	Japan	HySE	0	2	0	2
4	China	Arctic Leopard, Segway	0	1	4	5
5	Canada	Can-Am	0	1	0	1
5	France		0	1	0	1
7	Argentina		0	0	2	2

== Overall ==
The following records aggregate results across the primary competitive categories of the Dakar Rally: Bikes, Quads, Cars, Stock, Challenger (T3), SSV (T4), and Trucks. These categories constitute the main event, competing under shared sporting regulations for elapsed-time victory over the full rally distance.

This section excludes the Dakar Classic (regularity-based) and Mission 1000 (experimental/reduced distance) events, which operate under distinct scoring systems and routes.

=== Wins ===
Rank	Competitor	Wins	Category
1	(France) **Stéphane Peterhansel**	14	Bikes/Cars
2	(Russia) Vladimir Chagin	7	Trucks
3	(Czech Republic) Karel Loprais	6	Trucks
3	(Qatar) **Nasser Al-Attiyah**	6	Cars
4	(France) Cyril Neveu	5	Bikes
4	(France) Cyril Despres	5	Bikes
4	(Spain) Marc Coma	5	Bikes
8	(Italy) Edi Orioli	4	Bikes
8	(Finland) Ari Vatanen	4	Cars
8	(Spain) **Carlos Sainz**	4	Cars
8	(Russia) Eduard Nikolaev	4	Trucks
12	(France) Richard Sainct	3	Bikes
12	(Argentina) Marcos Patronelli	3	Quads
12	(Chile) **Ignacio Casale**	3	Quads
12	(Chile) **Francisco López Contardo**	3	Challenger/SSV
12	(France) Pierre Lartigue	3	Cars
12	(France) René Metge	3	Cars
18	(United Kingdom) Sam Sunderland	2	Bikes
18	(France) Hubert Auriol	2	Bikes
18	(Belgium) Gaston Rahier	2	Bikes
18	(Italy) Fabrizio Meoni	2	Bikes
18	(Australia) **Toby Price**	2	Bikes
18	(Spain) **Nani Roma**	2	Bikes/Cars
18	(Argentina) Alejandro Patronelli	2	Quads
18	(France) Jean-Louis Schlesser	2	Cars
18	(Japan) Hiroshi Masuoka	2	Cars
18	(France) Georges Groine	2	Trucks
18	(Italy) Francesco Perlini	2	Trucks
18	(Russia) Firdaus Kabirov	2	Trucks
18	(Netherlands) Gerard de Rooy	2	Trucks
18	(Russia) Andrey Karginov	2	Trucks
18	(Czech Republic) Josef Macháček	2	Quads/Challenger
18	(Russia) Dmitry Sotnikov	2	Trucks
18	(Czech Republic) **Martin Macík**	2	Trucks

=== Wins by nationality ===
Rank	Nationality	Wins	Category
1	France	53	Bikes/Quads/Cars/SSV/Trucks
2	Russia	20	Quads/Trucks
3	Spain	13	Bikes/Cars/Challenger
4	Argentina	12	Bikes/Quads/Challenger
5	Czech Republic	10	Quads/Challenger/Trucks
5	Italy	10	Bikes/Trucks
7	United States	7	Bikes/Challenger/SSV
8	Chile	6	Quads/Challenger/SSV
8	Qatar	6	Cars
10	Finland	5	Cars
10	Netherlands	5	Trucks
12	Australia	3	Bikes
12	Belgium	3	Bikes/Cars
12	Germany	3	Cars/Trucks
12	Japan	3	Cars
16	Austria	2	Bikes/Trucks
16	Brazil	2	SSV
16	Lithuania	2	Stock/Trucks
16	Poland	2	Quads/SSV
16	United Kingdom	2	Bikes
21	Algeria	1	Trucks
21	Saudi Arabia	1	Cars
21	South Africa	1	Cars

=== Stage wins ===
Rank	Competitor	Wins	Category
1	(France) **Stéphane Peterhansel**	83	Bikes/Cars
2	(Russia) Vladimir Chagin	63	Trucks
3	(Finland) Ari Vatanen	50	Cars
3	(Qatar) **Nasser Al-Attiyah**	50	Cars
5	(Spain) **Carlos Sainz**	42	Cars
6	(France) Hubert Auriol	37	Bikes/Cars
6	(Russia) Firdaus Kabirov	37	Trucks
8	(France) Cyril Despres	35	Bikes/Cars/SSV
9	(Netherlands) Gérard de Rooy	33	Trucks
10	(Belgium) Jacky Ickx	29	Cars
10	(Spain) Joan Barreda	29	Bikes
12	(Spain) Jordi Arcarons	27	Bikes
13	(Japan) Hiroshi Masuoka	25	Cars
13	(Spain) **Nani Roma**	25	Bikes/Cars
13	(Spain) Marc Coma	25	Bikes
16	(France) Jean-Pierre Fontenay	24	Cars
16	(Russia) Eduard Nikolaev	24	Trucks
18	(France) **Sébastien Loeb**	23	Cars
18	(Chile) **Ignacio Casale**	23	Quads
20	(France) Pierre Lartigue	21	Cars
20	(Japan) Kenjiro Shinozuka	21	Cars
20	(Russia) Andrey Karginov	21	Trucks
20	(Argentina) Marcos Patronelli	21	Quads
24	(Italy) Alessandro De Petri	19	Bikes
25	(Netherlands) Hans Stacey	18	Trucks
25	(United States) **Seth Quintero**	18	Challenger
25	(South Africa) Giniel de Villiers	18	Cars
28	(Italy) Edi Orioli	17	Bikes
28	(Belgium) Gaston Rahier	17	Bikes
30	(Czech Republic) Karel Loprais	16	Trucks
31	(France) Richard Sainct	15	Bikes
31	(Australia) **Toby Price**	15	Bikes
31	(France) **Bruno Saby**	15	Cars
31	(France) Jean-Louis Schlesser	15	Cars
31	(Russia) Dmitry Sotnikov	15	Trucks

=== Wins by manufacturer ===
Rank	Manufacturer	Wins	Category
1	(Japan) Yamaha	23	Bikes/Quads
2	(Russia) Kamaz	19	Trucks
3	(Austria) **KTM**	18	Bikes
4	(Japan) Mitsubishi	12	Cars
5	(Japan) **Honda**	7	Bikes
5	(France) Peugeot	7	Cars
5	(Canada) **Can-Am**	7	Challenger/SSV
8	(Czech Republic) **Tatra**	6	Trucks
8	(United Kingdom) **Mini**	6	Cars
8	(Germany) BMW	6	Bikes
8	(Germany) Mercedes-Benz	6	Cars/Trucks
12	(Japan) **Toyota**	5	Cars
13	(France) Citroën	4	Cars
13	(Germany) **Volkswagen**	4	Cars
13	(Italy) Perlini	4	Trucks
16	(Italy) Cagiva	2	Bikes
16	(Germany) Porsche	2	Cars
16	(United Kingdom) Range Rover	2	Cars
16	(France) Schlesser	2	Cars
16	(Italy) **Iveco**	2	Trucks
21	(Spain) **Gas Gas**	1	Bikes
21	(United States) **Polaris**	1	SSV
21	(France) **Renault**	1	Cars
21	(Algeria) Sonacome	1	Trucks
21	(France) ALM/Acmat	1	Trucks
21	(Netherlands) **DAF**	1	Trucks
21	(Japan) **Hino**	1	Trucks
21	(Germany) **MAN**	1	Trucks

=== Stage wins by manufacturer ===
Rank	Manufacturer	Wins	Category
1	(Japan) Yamaha	293	Bikes/Quads/Challenger
2	(Austria) **KTM**	228	Bikes
3	(Russia) Kamaz	178	Trucks
4	(Japan) Mitsubishi	156	Cars/Trucks
5	(Japan) **Honda**	107	Bikes/Quads
6	(France) Peugeot	78	Cars
7	(Germany) BMW	61	Bikes/Cars
8	(Italy) Cagiva	59	Bikes
8	(France) Citroën	59	Cars
8	(Germany) **Volkswagen**	59	Cars
11	(Canada) **Can-Am**	54	Quads/SSV
12	(Japan) **Toyota**	52	Cars
13	(United Kingdom) **Mini**	42	Cars
13	(Czech Republic) **Tatra**	42	Trucks
15	(Italy) **Iveco**	40	Trucks
16	(United Kingdom) Range Rover	34	Cars
17	(France) Schlesser	30	Cars
18	(Belgium) OT3	27	Challenger/SSV
19	(Germany) **MAN**	22	Trucks
20	(Japan) **Nissan**	21	Cars
20	(United States) **Polaris**	21	Quads/SSV
20	(Germany) Porsche	21	Cars
23	(Germany) Mercedes-Benz	20	Cars/Trucks
24	(Russia) Lada	18	Cars
25	(Netherlands) **DAF**	16	Trucks
26	(Japan) **Hino**	15	Trucks

=== Rally ===
==== Entrants ====
- Highest number of entrants (including 224 assistance cars and trucks): 688 (2005)
- Highest number of entrants (only competitors): 603 (1988)
- Highest number of female entrants: 17 (2019)

==== Finishers ====
- Highest number of finishers: 317 (2022) (446 including Classic)
- Highest percentage of entrants finishing: 77.51% (2017) (80.94% including Classic)
- Lowest number of entrants: 153 (1993)
- Lowest number of finishers: 67 (1993)
- Lowest percentage of entrants finishing: 20.58% (1986)

==== Distance ====
- Longest rally: 15,000 km/9,320 miles (1986)
- Shortest rally: 6263 km/3,892 miles (1981)

==== Countries ====
- Most countries: 11 in 1992 (France, Libya, Niger, Chad, Central African Republic, Cameroon, Gabon, Congo, Angola, Namibia, South Africa)
- Fewest countries: 1 in 2019 (Peru), 2020 - 2023 (Saudi Arabia)

==== Largest difference between winner and last place ====
(since 2009, until further reliable data is found)

Class	Year	Winner		Last Place		Difference
Class	Year	Competitor	Result	Competitor	Result	Difference
Bike	2022	(United Kingdom) Sam Sunderland	38:47:30	(Ecuador) Juan Puga	203:59:47	+165:12:17
Quad	2014	(Chile) Ignacio Casale	68:28:04	(Argentina) Eugenio Favre	155:25:31	+86:57:27
Car	2019	(Qatar) Nasser Al-Attiyah	34:38:14	(Spain) Alex Aguirregaviria	524:26:48	+489:48:34
T3	2022	(Chile) Francisco López Contardo	45:50:51	(Russia) Boris Gadasin	230:03:52	+184:13:01
T4	2018	(Brazil) Reinaldo Varela	72:44:06	(Argentina) Leo Larrauri	205:04:18	+132:20:12
Truck	2014	(Russia) Andrey Karginov	55:00:28	(Andorra) Georges Ginesta	336:49:15	+391:48:47
Classic	2021	(France) Marc Douton	961	(Spain) Ignacio Corcuera	307707	+306746

=== Individuals ===
- Highest percentage of stage wins in a single rally: Seth Quintero with 92.31% (12/13) (2022)
- Most podiums without a win: Yoshimasa Sugawara with 7 podiums (6x and 1x)
- Most entries: Yoshimasa Sugawara and Stéphane Peterhansel with 36 entries
- Most consecutive entries: Yoshimasa Sugawara with 36 entries (1983-2007, 2009-2019)
- Most finishes: Yoshimasa Sugawara with 29 finishes
- Most consecutive finishes: Giniel de Villiers with 21 (2003-2007, 2009-2024)
- Most consecutive top 10 finishes: Giniel de Villiers with 16 (2009-2024)
- Most classes competed in: Kees Koolen 5 classes (Bike/Quad/Car/Truck/SSV), Ignacio Casale 5 classes (Bike/Quad/Truck/SSV/Challenger), Yoshimasa Sugawara 3 classes (Bike/Car/Truck), Cyril Despres 3 classes (Bike/Car/SSV), Giulio Verzeletti 3 classes (Bike/Car/Truck), Xavier Foj 3 classes (Truck/Car/SSV), Francisco López Contardo 3 classes (Bikes/Challenger/SSV), Hélder Rodrigues 3 classes (Bikes/Challenger/SSV), Eryk Goczał 3 classes (Car/Challenger/SSV), Rokas Baciuška 3 classes (Car/Challenger/SSV) and Oriol Vidal 3 classes (Car/Challenger/SSV)
- Oldest competitor: Marcel Hugueny at 81 years (1995)
- Oldest rookie: Graham Knight at 68, ? months, ? days (2020)
- Oldest winner: Josef Macháček at 63, 10 months, 2 days (2021)
- Youngest competitor: Mitchel van den Brink at 16 years, 357 days (2019)
- Youngest winner of a stage:
  - Bike: Edgar Canet at 20 years, 294 days (Stage 1, 2026)
  - Car: Saood Variawa at 19 years, 190 days (Stage 3, 2025)
  - Challenger T3: Seth Quintero at 18 years, 114 days (Stage 2, 2021)
  - SSV T4: Eryk Goczał at 18 years, 56 days (Stage 1, 2023)
  - Truck: Mitchel van den Brink at 21 years, 357 days (Stage 6, 2023)
- Youngest finisher:
  - Bike: Konrad Dabrowski at 19 years, 162 days (2021)
  - Car: Saood Variawa at 19 years, 200 days (2025)
  - Truck: Mitchel van den Brink at 17 years, 3 days (2019)
- First female winner (cars): Jutta Kleinschmidt (2001)
- Fewest Classic points: 399 Serge Mogno (2022)
- Most Classic points: 307,707 Roberto Camporese (2021)
- Most Classic penalty points: 87,420 Ignacio Corcuera (2021)

=== Vehicle ===
- Most successful vehicle model: Mitsubishi Pajero Evolution with 12 wins
- Most manufacturer wins: Kamaz with 19 wins.
- Most manufacturer finishes: Yamaha (bikes), Honda (bikes), Toyota (cars) had a vehicle finish in all 43 rallies

== Countries ==
=== Number of times started in ===
Country	Years	Starts
France	1979, 1980, 1981, 1982, 1983, 1984, 1985, 1986, 1987, 1988, 1989, 1990, 1991, 1992, 1993, 1994, 1998, 2001, 2002, 2003, 2004	21
Argentina	2009, 2010, 2011, 2012, 2014, 2015, 2016	7
Saudi Arabia	2020, 2021, 2022, 2023, 2024, 2025, 2026	7
Spain	1995, 1996, 1999, 2005	4
Peru	2013, 2018, 2019	3
Senegal	1997, 2000	2
Portugal	2006, 2007	2
Paraguay	2017	1

=== Number of times finished in ===
Country	Years	Finishes
Senegal	1979, 1980, 1981, 1982, 1983, 1984, 1985, 1986, 1987, 1988, 1989, 1990, 1991, 1993, 1994, 1995, 1996, 1997, 1998, 1999, 2001, 2002, 2004, 2005, 2006, 2007	26
Argentina	2009, 2010, 2011, 2015, 2016, 2017, 2018	7
Saudi Arabia	2020, 2021, 2022, 2023, 2024, 2025, 2026	7
Egypt	2000, 2003	2
Chile	2013, 2014	2
Peru	2012, 2019	2
South Africa	1992	1
France	1994	1

=== Number of times entered ===
Country	Entries
Senegal	27
Mali	22
France	21
Mauritania	20
Niger	14
Morocco	12
Spain	12
Algeria	10
Argentina	10
Burkina Faso (Upper Volta)	7
Chile	7
Libya	6
Guinea	6
Saudi Arabia	6
Bolivia	5
Peru	4
Ivory Coast	3
Egypt	2
Portugal	2
Chad	2
Tunisia	2
South Africa	1
Angola	1
Cameroon	1
Gabon	1
(Democratic Republic of the Congo) Congo	1
Namibia	1
Central African Republic	1
Sierra Leone	1
Paraguay	1
