= Carrera del Golfo al Pacífico =

Carrera del Golfo al Pacífico is a regularity rally in México. It starts in Veracruz and finishes in Acapulco. Is a two-day event. In the first day the cars go to Cuernavaca, and the second day finish in Acapulco.

== Champions ==
=== Overall ===
Year	Driver	Co-driver	Car
2002	(Mexico) Rafael Vargas	(Mexico) Francisco Martínez Gallardo	(United Kingdom) MG A
2003	(Mexico) Fernando Couto	(Mexico) Rodrigo Arrioja	(United Kingdom) Jaguar S-type
2004	(Mexico) Mario Ramírez Roldán	(Mexico) Mario Ramirez	(United Kingdom) Mini
2005	(Mexico) Fernando Couto	(Mexico) Rodrigo Arrioja	(United Kingdom) Jaguar S-type
2006	(Mexico) Eduardo López Márquez	(Mexico) José Antonio Arellano	(Germany) Audi TT
2007	(Mexico) Luis Orduña	(Mexico) Luis Orduña Jr.	(United Kingdom) Jaguar X-type
2008	(Mexico) Luis Orduña	(Mexico) Luis Orduña Jr.	(United States) Ford Focus
2009	(Mexico) Rogelio Martínez	(Mexico) Eduardo Naranjo	(United States) Chevrolet Astra
2010	(Mexico) Luis Orduña	(Mexico) Luis Orduña Jr.	(United States) Ford Focus RS
2011	(Mexico) Eduardo López Márquez	(Mexico) José Antonio Arellano	(United Kingdom) Mini
