= Tacita (disambiguation) =

Tacita is a synonym for Mohnia, a genus of sea snails.

Tacita may also refer to:

- Dea Tacita, a goddess of the dead in Roman mythology
- Tacita (motorcycles), an Italian manufacturer of electric motorcycles
- Tacita Dean (born 1965), a British artist
