= 1/100 Regularity Rally =

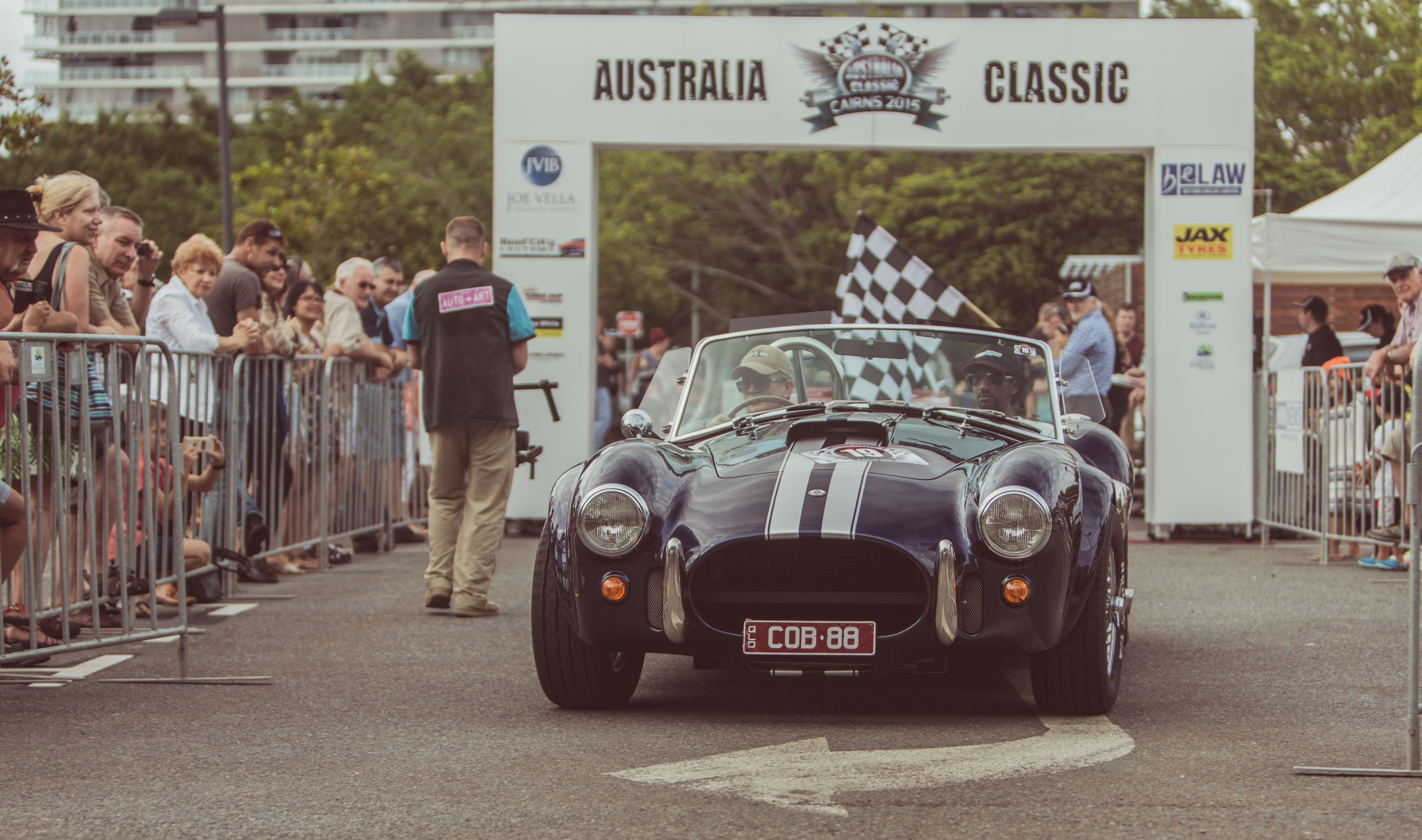
The start gate of Australia Classic 2015, a 1/100 regularity in Cairns, Queensland, Australia

The 1/100 regularity rally is a typically European format of regularity rally often for classic cars. As with other regularity rallies, the aim is not to be the fastest but rather to stay on the prescribed time across all timed checkpoints. Accordingly, 1/100 regularity rallies carry a negligible risk of damage to the vehicles and participants.

1/100 regularity rallies are generally conducted on open, public roads alongside regular traffic, without the contestants knowing the route in advance. Teams usually take off at fixed intervals, creating a field that is spread along the course. The route is described in a roadbook sign by sign, to be deciphered by the navigator. In addition to having to adhere to the prescribed arrival times to the timed checkpoints, the route is also sprinkled with 1/100 challenges - where the denomination of the rally comes from.

1/100 challenges are special tasks between ordinary stages of the rally, timed to the accuracy of 1/100 second (0.01s). The roadbook will usually include a chart with the layout for each challenge with their prescribed completion times, and competitors would receive penalty points for every 0.01s too early or too late across the finish line.

== Characteristics ==
A typical 1/100 regularity rally may run for a few hours or it may run over a series of stages over a few days.

Competitors are usually briefed about the event at the start, and may be required to submit their cars for inspection. Each team is given a roadbook and a timecard prior to departure. This timecard will record departure and arrival times at all timed checkpoints.

Teams' scores are determined by adding all penalty points from timed checkpoints, 1/100 challenges, missing stamps or other control measures, and route errors. In addition, some events apply a multiplier to the overall score of participants based on the year of manufacture of their vehicle, to offset any potential advantage of more modern technology.

The team with the lowest number of penalties wins.

== Equipment ==
Most 1/100 regularity rallies require a stopwatch to complete. The rules of each event determine what kind of devices are permitted. Some common aids include:

- Odometer: Odometers can range from the odometer included on the dashboard of most cars to specially manufactured rally odometers.
- Speedometer: As with odometers, speedometers used by rallyists range from those built into the vehicle to specially manufactured rally speedometers.
- Stopwatch: Accurate time is essential in regularity rallying - in 1/100 rallies a mechanical stopwatch is preferred.

== Notable 1/100 Regularity Rallies ==
Austria's famous Silvretta Classic has been held since 1998 with 200 cars attending every year. The hosting Motor Klassik magazine organises several similar rallies, such as the annual Paul Pietsch Classic and the Sachsen Classic.

The Hungarian Oldtimer Supercup comprises 4-8 rallies for classic cars every year since 2002, based on the 1/100 regularity format.

From 2012 Australia has been hosting their own 1/100 regularity series called the Australia Classic.

In 2009, in episode 6 of season 13 of Top Gear Jeremy Clarkson and his team participated in the Rally Clásico Isla Mallorca, a 1/100 regularity rally in Mallorca.
