= Dakar Classic =

- Inaugural race logo
- Category: Rally raid Historic motorsport
- Country: Saudi Arabia
- Inaugural season: 2021
- Drivers' champion: (Lithuania) Karolis Raišys
- Official website: www.dakar.com/en/dakar-classic

The Dakar Classic is a historic motorsport rally raid that takes place annually as part of the Dakar Rally. Unlike the main rally, the Classic is reserved for older vehicles.

Introduced in 2021, it follows the same route as the Dakar Rally but competes on a separate course as a regularity rally.

== History ==
The Amaury Sport Organisation, which oversees the Dakar Rally, announced the creation of the Dakar Classic in June 2020. Dakar director David Castera explained it was "important for us to honour the Dakar's pioneer" by hosting a race for vehicles from the rally's history. Teams also operate out of a bivouac with fewer amenities to resemble those used in the 1980s.

The inaugural race took place alongside the 2021 Dakar Rally. Former rally driver Yves Loubet and his co-driver Alain Lopes oversaw reconnaissance of the course, which had the same start and finish points as the main Dakar but ran shorter stages. Marc Douton won in a 1978 buggy that was built by Yves Sunhill for the first Dakar Rally in 1979.

From 2022 to 2025, the race was dominated by the Toyota Land Cruiser HDJ80. Serge Mogno won in 2022 while Juan Morera did so in 2023; Morera described the HDJ80 as a reliable and "very robust car", which made it "one of the best options for a Dakar Classic." Carlos Santaolalla became the Classic's first overall repeat winner when he claimed the 2024 and 2025 editions.

For the first four years, the Classic only permitted cars built before 1999. This was changed to 2005 for the 2025 edition.

In 2026, Tomasz Białkowski became the first truck driver to win a Dakar stage outright when he won the third leg of the Classic. He raced the Bull, a DAF truck made famous by Jan de Rooy at the 1985 Paris–Dakar Rally. Although it was one of the oldest and slowest vehicles entered, Karolis Raišys won the overall in a 1978 Land Rover Series III 109.

== Format ==
Unlike the Dakar Rally, which uses a special stage format in which the fastest time wins, the Dakar Classic follows regularity rules. In a regularity race, drivers follow the course at a mandated speed limit and must finish the stage as close to a given time frame as possible. Points are added for mistakes and penalties, with the winner being whomever records the fewest points.

A stage is divided into four types of tests. A Regularity Test (RT) consists of staying at a certain speed and finishing close to the benchmark time. Navigation Tests (NT) requires drivers to complete the section within a maximum time limit. The Dune Test (DT) follows the same rules as the Navigation Test but takes place in dunes, and is therefore optional for trucks and slower cars. A Super Regularity Test (SRT) was introduced in 2026 and is much longer than other stages; in an SRT, navigators must disable their global positioning system's automatic functions that provide track markings and section countdown graphics, meaning they and the driver must figure out the course on their own.

Penalties include missing waypoints, arriving too early or late at the finish, and deviating too far from the course. A driver can receive up to 450 penalty points in a stage, while missing an SRT results in a fixed 500-point penalty. The final stage, called a "Power Stage", doubles the penalty points issued.

Navigators are also eligible for the Authentic Codriver Challenge if they navigate using a stopwatch and tripmeter rather than a standard roadbook and GPS.

== Vehicles ==
The ASO maintains a list of cars and trucks that are eligible for the Classic. Only those produced until 2005 are allowed, and must be based on cars that competed in the Dakar Rally or a rally raid in general during its lifespan regardless of whether it is a replica or original. Vehicles without rally experience can also take part if they are considered "historically relevant" by the organisation. While the ASO lists 1979 as the earliest year since it was when the first Dakar Rally took place, older cars are permitted too if they meet the necessary criteria; for example, Benoît Callewaert entered the 2021 Classic with a Volkswagen Beetle from 1968.

Vehicles are separated into three periods: "A" for those built before 1 January 1986, "B" for cars made until 31 December 1998, and "C" for 1999–2005 models. They are further split into groups by average speed: H1, H2, H3, and H4.

Former Dakar Rally competition vehicles can also take part in the Iconic Classic Club Challenge.

== Winners ==
Year	Driver	Navigator	Car
2021	(France) Marc Douton	(France) Emilien Etienne	Sunhill Buggy
2022	(France) Serge Mogno	(France) Florent Drulhon	Toyota Land Cruiser HDJ80
2023	(Spain) Juan Morera	(Spain) Lidia Ruba	Toyota Land Cruiser HDJ80
2024	(Spain) Carlos Santaolalla	(Spain) Jan Rosa i Viñas	Toyota Land Cruiser HDJ80
2025	(Spain) Carlos Santaolalla	(Spain) Jan Rosa i Viñas	Toyota Land Cruiser HDJ80
2026	(Lithuania) Karolis Raišys	(France) Christophe Marques	Land Rover Series III 109
