= Regularity rally =

Type of motorsport event

A regularity rally, also called time-speed-distance or TSD rally, is a type of motorsport rally with the object of driving each segment of a course in a specified time at a specified average speed. The rally is usually conducted on public roads, but sometimes includes off-road and track sections. Contestants usually start a regularity rally at fixed intervals, creating a field that is spread along the course.

== Origins ==
Regularity rallying shares its origins with other types of rallying. Unlike special stage rallying, regularity rallying does not depend on the abilities of the driver at high-speed nor does it depend on the speed that the vehicle can achieve. For this reason, ordinary motor vehicles can be used. (Regularity rallies are commonly held for classic or even vintage cars, see below.) Regularity rallying, therefore, is a far less expensive sport and can be enjoyed by a far greater spectrum of people. With the commercialisation and increasing competitiveness of special stage rallying, many people have been financially excluded from the sport and have therefore created many cheaper alternatives. The closest motor sport to regularity rallying is road rallying. Unlike a road rally, a regularity rally focuses somewhat more on the maintenance of precise speeds and times rather than on navigation. Navigation does, however, still play an important role in regularity rallying.

== Characteristics ==
A typical regularity rally may run for a few hours or it may run over a series of stages over a few days.

At the start, competitors are usually briefed about the event and may be required to submit their cars for inspection. Each team is given a route schedule prior to departure. This schedule contains information that the navigator will use to try to keep to the specified route and it contains information about the designated speeds and times for each segment of the route. On some rallies, more than one type of schedule may be prepared for different types of competitors.

Once a team is prepared, they will usually start the rally at a specific time unique to them. Along the route, the team will encounter marshals. The position of the marshals is usually not known to the teams. The time at which the team arrives at each marshal is recorded and used in the scoring. In some cases the marshals are hidden from view. Teams may also encounter open sections where they are guaranteed not to encounter marshals and are not subject to any time penalties. There may be various other features along the route including points at which teams must wait for an 'exact time of departure', points at which teams must record their own times, etc.

Every regularity rally should have a deterministic route schedule. This means that the organisers can work out the exact times that should be recorded for each team at all the relevant points along the route. The difference between a team's actual times and the correct times determine their penalties. Lateness and earliness both attract penalties. The team with the lowest number of penalties wins.

== Equipment ==
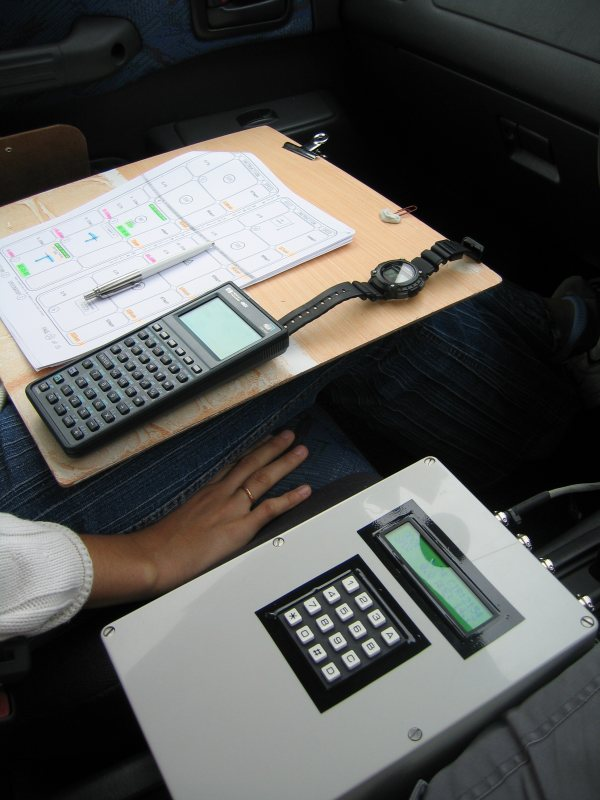
Some typical equipment used for regularity rallying.

It is usually possible to compete in a regularity rally using only a car (or sometimes a motorcycle) and a stopwatch, but many regularity rallyists use various devices in an attempt to reduce their total penalties. The rules of each rally determine which devices are permitted. Some common aids include:

- Odometer: Odometers can range from the odometer included on the dashboard of most cars to specially manufactured rally odometers.
- Speedometer: As with odometers, speedometers used by rallyists range from those built into the vehicle to specially manufactured rally speedometers.
- Stopwatch: Accurate time is essential in regularity rallying.
- GPS: GPS units provide speed, distance and navigational data, but there is some debate as to their usefulness in regularity rallying.
- Computer: Computers ranging from custom-made units to laptops can be used in some regularity rallies.
- Smartphone: Modern day smartphones and tablets allow the installation of apps that provide similar functionality to the previously mentioned devices.
- Curta: This mechanical calculator was popular among contestants in rallies during the 1960s, 1970s and into the 1980s. It was affectionately known as the "pepper grinder" or "peppermill."

=== Roadbook or roadmap ===
The roadbook or logbook is a type of map encoded with the correct road to be followed. It counts for all the information about the distances, time and average speed that must be followed throughout the competition. It is through these sheets that the navigator will direct, as well as pace, the driver. At the rally the book is divided into several sections that may be of the following types:

- Regularity Tracks: are the passages in which the contestants must maintain a predetermined average speed, expressed in km/h. Averages are compatible with the type of road traversed.
- Deslocation Tracks: are stages used between towns and displacements on main roads, which because of their characteristics, do not allow competitors to maintain a high average speed. In these parts a maximum time is specified to fulfil the stage, so competitors can complete them safely.
- Neutral Tracks: are untimed stages used by competitors to replenish fuel, food, do maintenance or simply to rest during the competition.

== Classic regularity rallies ==
Regularity rallies are sometimes held for owners of classic cars. Since regularity rallies do not involve high speed, classic cars are able to participate on an equal footing with other cars and with less risk of damage to the cars.

The Rallye Glenwood Springs is the longest continuously running classic car rally in North America. It has been held annually since 1952, starting in Denver, CO and running over 120 miles through the Colorado Rockies to Glenwood Springs, CO.

The Cascade Classic Rally & Tour is a 4 day event held in Washington State and British Columbia in which participants travel over 400 miles over scenic back roads. The event has run annually since 1997 and is known for its fun and unique locations.

The Dakar Classic has been held since 2021 as a regularity counterpart to the Dakar Rally for historic cars.

A popular specific variety of classic rallying is the 1/100 Regularity Rally.

== Offroad Regularity Rallies ==
In Brazil, Mitsubishi Motors promotes an offroad regularity rally for its clients since 1994, the Mitsubishi Motorsports. There are also state championships held by local federations, such as Paulista Off-Road and Novo Rally MG.

== Notable events ==
- Carrera del Golfo al Pacífico, Mexico
- Tour de Cebu, Visayas
- Tarmac West, Australia
