= Karolis Raišys =

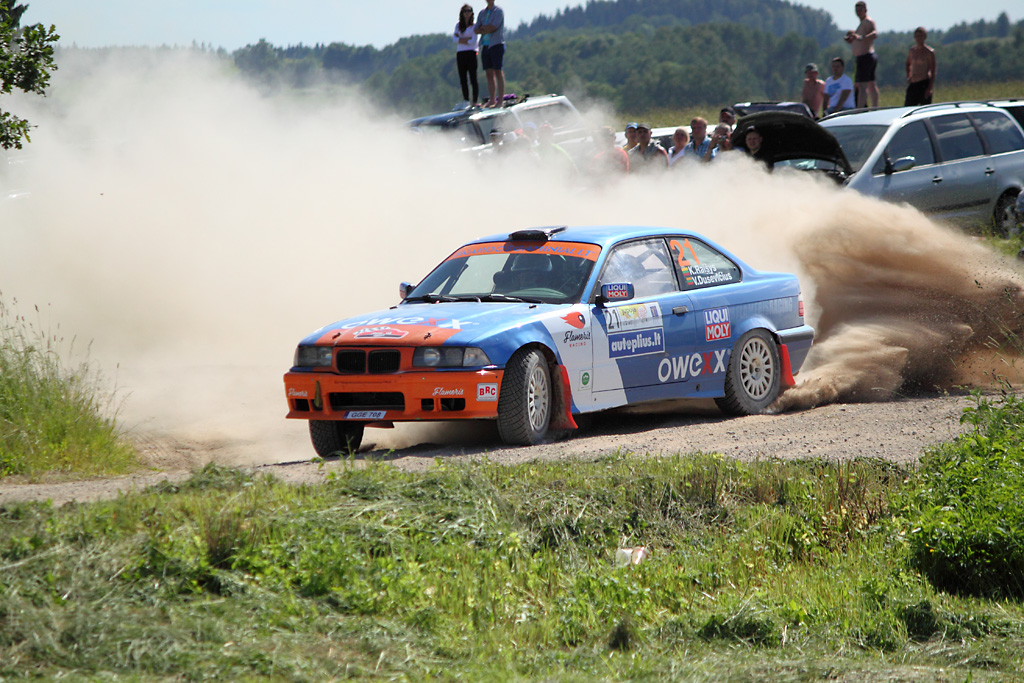
- Raišys competing in the 2013 Rally Saulė 777
- Nationality: Lithuanian
- Born: 2 May 1982 (age 44)

Previous series
- 2025–2026 2017–present 2021–2022 2010–2021: Dakar Classic; Rallye Monte-Carlo Historique; Lithuanian Street Race Championship; Lithuanian Rally Championship

Championship titles
- 2026 2013–2014 2014 2011 2008–2011, 2013 2007: Dakar Classic; Lithuanian Rally Class 7 Lithuanian Rally 2WD; Lithuanian Rally SG2000; Lithuanian Autoslalom RWD; Lithuanian Autoslalom SG2000
- Statistics up to date as of 19 February 2026.

Karolis Raišys (born 2 May 1982) is a Lithuanian rally driver. He competes in the Lithuanian Rally Championship and classic rally events.

Raišys has won four Lithuanian rally titles and the Dakar Classic in 2026.

== Racing career ==
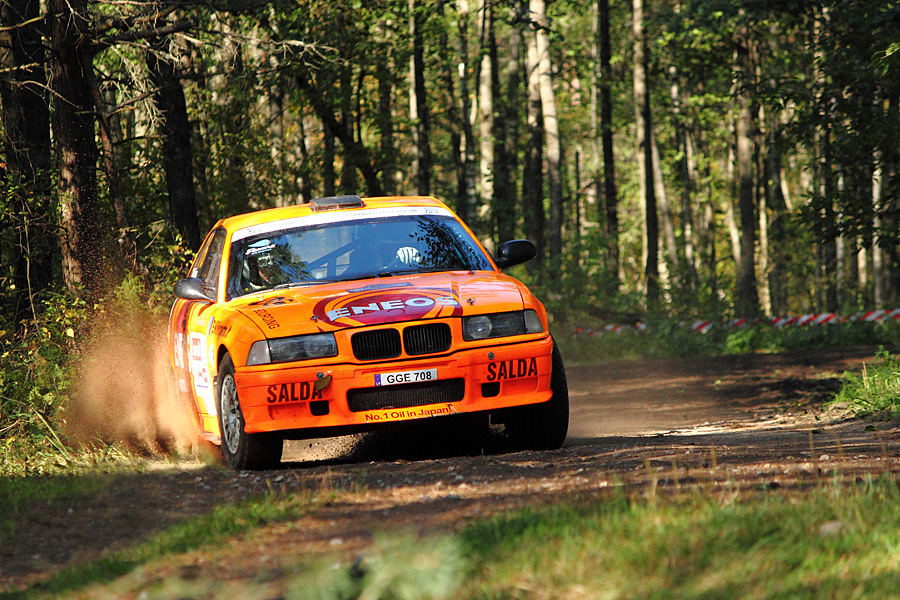
Raišys racing in the 2014 Classic Rally Druskininkai

Raišys started racing in Lithuania's national autoslalom series. He won a championship every year from 2007 to 2011, claiming the SG2000 title in 2007 followed by four in a row in the rear-wheel drive category; he added a fifth RWD title in 2013.

In 2010, Raišys made his debut in the Lithuanian Rally Championship, driving an Opel Astra with Rytis Lukauskas as his co-driver and finishing second in SG2000 points. A year later, he recorded his first victory when he won Class S2000 at the Classic Rally Druskininkai; Raišys went on to win the 2011 SG2000 championship.

Raišys moved to the LRC's Class 7 for 2013, where he began racing a BMW M3 E36 alongside Vytautas Dusevičius. Raišys won the championship with two class victories. 2014 saw him add another Class 7 title as well as the 2WD championship, this time with Mindaugas Kašalynas as his navigator. During the 2014 season, he was also disqualified from the Talsi Rally for allegedly shooting and killing five chickens.

Raišys dabbled in time trials in 2021 and 2022, finishing third among SGC4 drivers in Lithuania's Street Race Championship both years.

=== Classic rally ===
Besides his usual rallying, Raišys also frequently tries out classic rally. He said in 2015 that "returning to motorsport's past reveals the very essence of rallying – to be an open, enthuastic, and real driver event."

Raišys initially competed in a Mini Cooper S, with which he won the Madona Rally in 2015.

In 2017, Raišys' Flameris Racing was the first Lithuanian team to compete in the Rallye Monte-Carlo Historique. He and co-driver Vytautas Černiauskas raced a 1965 MG MGB, but a fuel pump failure prevented them from being classified despite finishing.

For the 2019 Monte Carlo, Raišys switched to a 1958 Jaguar XK150 FHC. The Jaguar won its class in the 2019 and 2020 races, including placing fourth overall in the former. He returned to the rally in 2023, finishing second in category with the XK150 followed by a third class victory in 2024.

Raišys ran the Rally de Portugal Histórico in 2021 and 2023, racing a 1961 Jaguar Mark 2 that he procured from the Automuseum Vilnius. He won his class in both years.

=== Dakar ===
Raišys followed the Dakar Rally in 2024 as a journalist for 15min.

As a brand ambassador for Land Rover and certified Land Rover Off-Road Driving Experience instructor, Raišys registered for the 2025 Dakar Classic with a 1978 Series III 109. It was based on the car driven by Maurice and Michel Calamel in the 1979 Paris–Dakar Rally. Raišys considered the station wagon the oldest and slowest vehicle in the field, and it was categorised in H1.A ("H1" is for cars of a low average speed, while "A" refers to vehicles built before 1986). Despite the car's performance and a power steering issue on the eighth stage, Raišys and navigator Ignas Daunoravičius finished third and won their class.

While Raišys brought back the Land Rover for the 2026 Classic, he had Christophe Marques as his co-driver after Daunoravičius joined another team. He and Marques had never worked together before, only meeting for the first time when they arrived in Saudi Arabia for the Dakar. Raišys won six stages and the overall.

== Career record ==
=== Dakar Classic ===
Year	Vehicle	Position	Stage wins
2025	Land Rover	3rd	0
2026	Land Rover	1st	6
