= Jaguar S-Type =

Jaguar S-Type is the name of two vehicles:

- Jaguar S-Type (1963) (1963–1968)
- Jaguar S-Type (1999) (1999–2008)
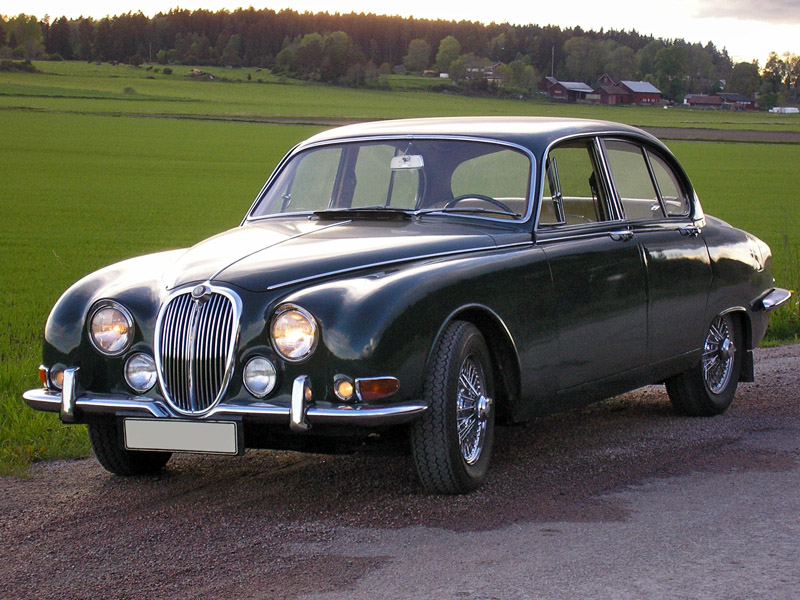
1963–1968 Jaguar S-Type

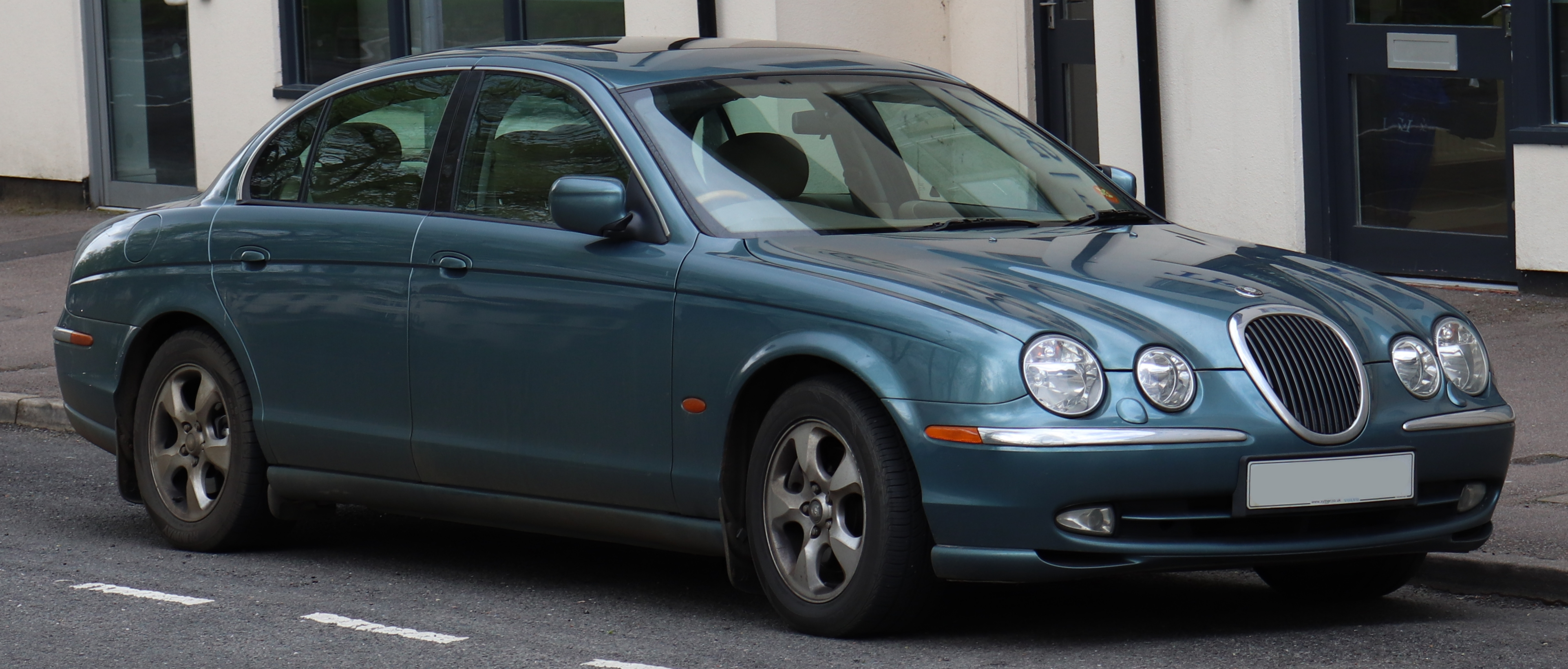
1999–2007 Jaguar S-Type
