= Serge Mogno =

French racing driver

- Nationality: French
- Teams: Team FSO
- Championships: Dakar Classic
- Wins: 2022

Serge Mogno is a French rally raid driver. He won the 2022 Dakar Rally in the Dakar Classic category, winning at least one stage in the process.

== Career results ==
=== Dakar Classic ===
Year	Class	Vehicle	Position	Stage wins
2022	Classic	Toyota	1st	1
2023	Classic	Toyota	5th	0
