= Perlini =

Italian lorry manufacturer

Coordinates: 45.4054°N 11.2736°E

Perlini Equipment SpA
- Industry: Heavy equipment
- Founded: San Bonifacio, Italy (1957)
- Founder: Roberto Perlini
- Headquarters: San Bonifacio, Verona, Italy
- Area served: Worldwide
- Key people: Maurizio Perlini, Francesco Perlini, Mauro Cangialeoni
- Products: Off-road dump trucks
- Parent: Cangialeoni Group; XCMG
- Website: perlinidumpers.com

Perlini or Perlini Equipment SpA is an Italian off-road dump truck/lorry manufacturer.

Established in 1957 by Roberto Perlini, Perlini is based in San Bonifacio.

The company has two manufacturing facilities with a total area of 130.000 square meters in San Bonifacio and Gambellara.

== History ==
Perlini started as an industrial vehicle transformation company in 1957. In 1961, it started directly producing dump trucks, still its main business today. In the sixties, Perlini started selling a very large volume of dump trucks in the Chinese market, starting a very important commercial relationship, enduring through the years until the beginning of twenty-first century. Perlini trucks were employed in many large projects, including the construction of the Xiaolangdi Dam and Ertan dam.

In the late eighties, Perlini started participating in competitive races with its on-road dump trucks. The Perlini 105F "Red Tiger" has notably won the Dakar Rally four consecutive times, from 1990 to 1993.

In 2010, at the Bauma Construction Equipment fair, Perlini announced a partnership with Volvo Construction Equipment for distribution in the European market.

After the company went bankrupt in 2016, has been bought by Cangialeoni Group in 2018, now the new Industrie Macchine Perlini work in Gambellara and produce the latest rigid dumpers.

== Products ==
=== Dump Trucks ===
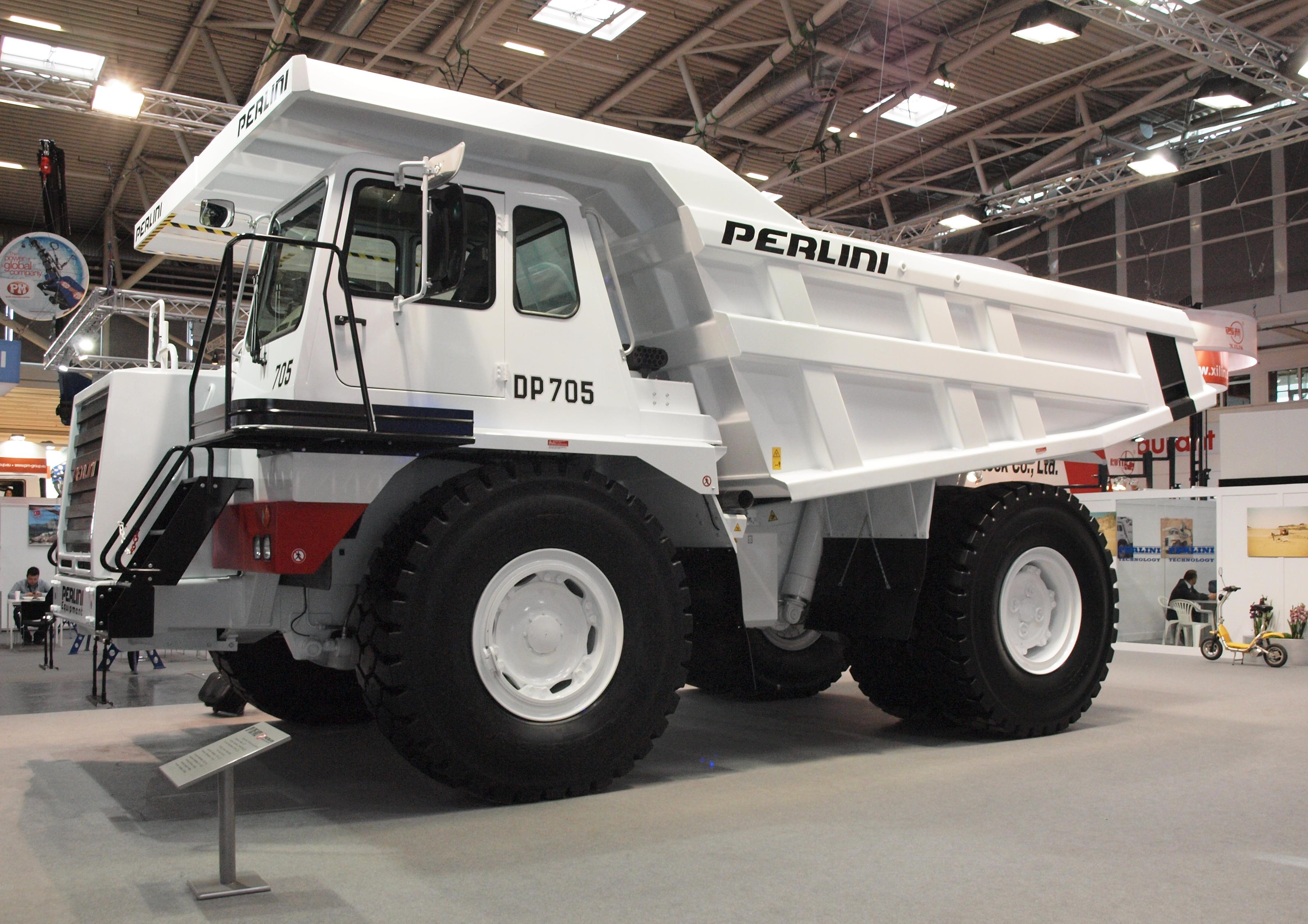
Perlini Dumper DP705WD2 with MTU Detroit Dieselengine 12V2000; power: 760HP; max. 3309 Nm; Loadcapacity: 30 cbm / 65 tons

Currently, Perlini produces dump trucks with a capacity from 30 to 95 metric tons, and it has sold over 12,000 units in the international market.

- DP 255
- DP 405 WD
- DP 605
- DP 705 WD
- DP 905
- DPT 70

=== Discontinued dump trucks ===
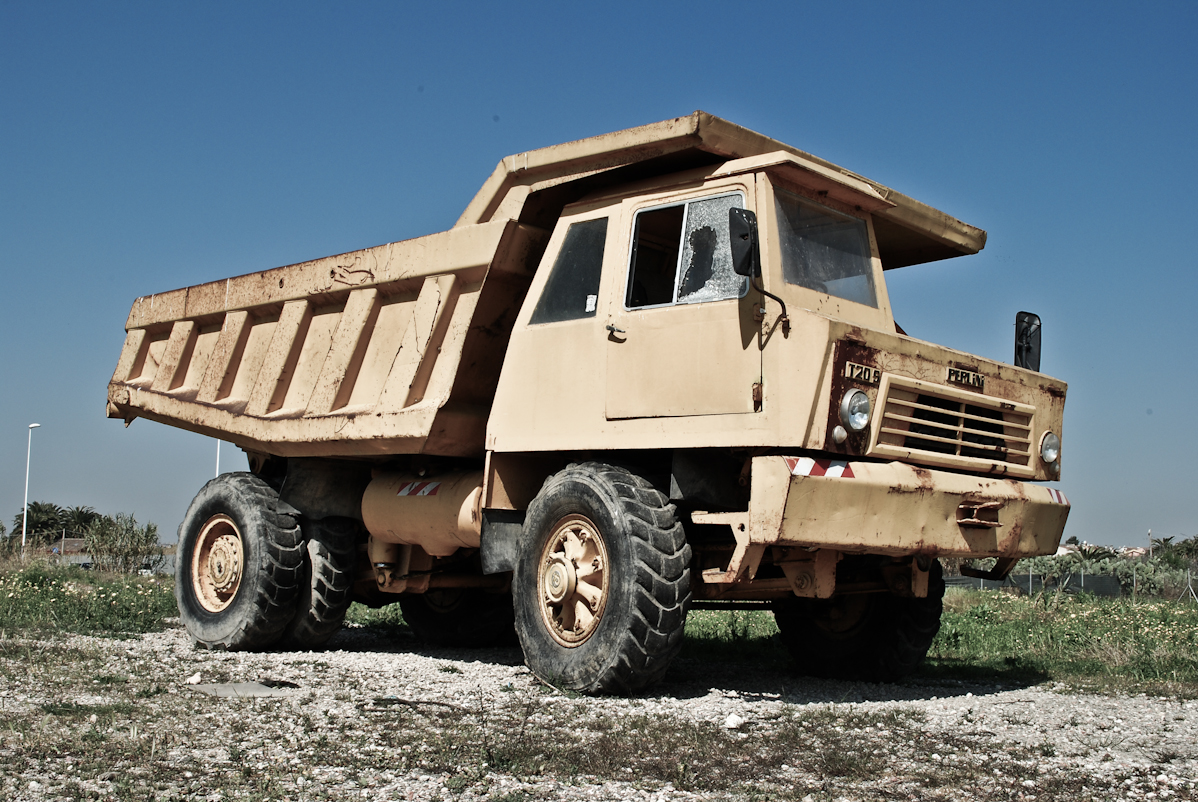
Perlini T20 S dump truck

- DP205
- DP 366
- DP 655
- DP 755
- DP 855
- DP 955
- T20
- T40

=== All terrain vehicles ===
- Models 131 and 105 F - for Dakar Rally
- fire trucks
  - AIS Perlini Baribbi crash tender using Perlini 605D chassis
  - B502 4x4 Rosehbauer
- quarry mining equipment

== See also ==
- List of Italian companies
