= Marc Douton =

French racing driver

- Nationality: French
- Teams: Sunhill
- Championships: Dakar Classic
- Wins: 2021

Marc Douton is a French rally raid driver. He won the 2021 Dakar Rally in the Dakar Classic category, winning 6 stages in the process. He was the first competitor to win the Dakar Rally in the classic category.

== Career results ==
=== Dakar Classic ===
Year	Vehicle	Position	Stage wins
2021	Sunhill	1st	6
2022	Porsche	9th	1
