= Roadbook =

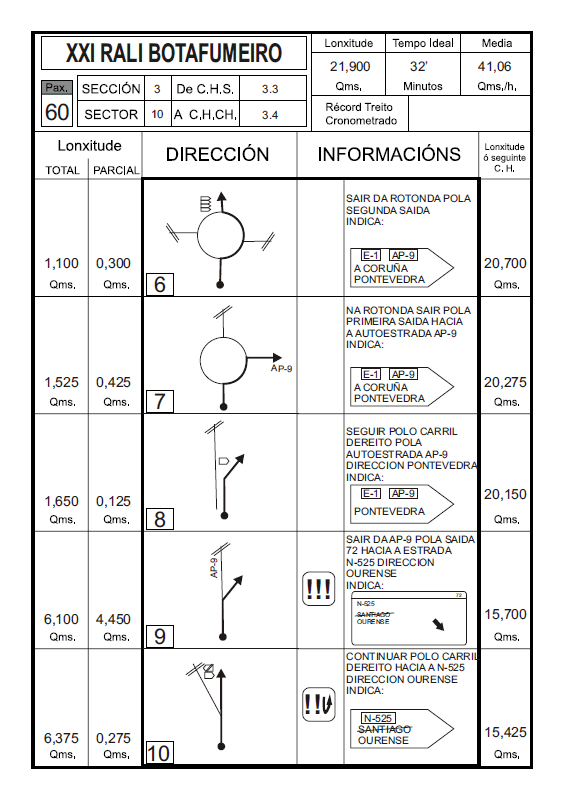
Example of a roadbook

A roadbook is a diagrammatic book typically used by rally co-drivers and overland travelers to navigate across uncertain terrain. Usually, the roadbook consists of several pages of tulip-diagrams, GPS co-ordinates and written instructions to assist in navigation.

In rally sport, the term pacenotes is more usual.
