= Tacita (motorcycles) =

- Company type: Privately held company
- Industry: Motorcycle manufacturing
- Founded: June 2009
- Founder: Pierpaolo Rigo; Dinamaria Ollino
- Headquarters: Via San Quintino 43, Turin, Italy
- Website: www.tacita.it

Tacita is an Italian manufacturer of electric motorcycles with corporate headquarters in Turin, Piedmont.

The brand was founded in June 2009 by Pierpaolo Rigo, a former rally raid rider from nearby Santena, and his partner Dinamaria Ollino. It is named after Tàcita, the Roman goddess of silence.

In 2019, the company moved from its Pisa workshop to a new factory in Poirino, and launched an American branch with offices in Miami, Florida. In addition to motorbikes, the company offers the T-Station, a trailer equipped with solar panels for both transportation and charging.

== Models ==
The company uses two main platforms, T-Cruise and T-Race, which are each iterated into submodels for different styles of travel and racing.

- T-Cruise
  - Urban
  - Turismo
- T-Race
  - Motard
  - Enduro
  - Rally
  - Cross

The T-Race also forms the basis for the Aero prototype introduced in 2017 by Italian coachbuilder E-Racer Motorcycles.

== Racing ==
Tacita's competitive debut took place at the 2012 Merzouga Rally in Morocco. It marked the first appearance of an electric motorbike at an African desert rally raid. In 2020, the company announced that the T-Race Rally would be the first fully electric motorbike to take part in the Dakar Rally, as part of a projected four-year commitment to the race. However, its inaugural showing was limited to a 20-kilometer, non-ranking special stage held on the final day of the race in Qiddiya City. After cancelling their participation in the 2021 and 2022 editions, Tacita indicated that they hope to return to the event in 2023.

The T-Race Cross also features in the FMI Ice Trophy, an Italian flat track ice racing series.

== See also ==
- Motorcycle
- List of Italian companies
- List of motorcycle manufacturers
