= 2022 Dakar Rally =

Off-road motorsport event in Saudi Arabia

Part of the Dakar Rally
← Previous event	Next event →
- Host country: Saudi Arabia
- Dates run: 1–14 January 2022
- Start: Ha'il
- Finish: Jeddah
- Stages: 12
- Stage surface: Sand, rocks, dirt, tarmac

Results
- Cars winner: (Qatar) Nasser Al-Attiyah (France) Mathieu Baumel; Toyota Gazoo Racing
- Bikes winner: (United Kingdom) Sam Sunderland; Gas Gas Factory Team
- Quads winner: (France) Alexandre Giroud; Yamaha Racing - SMX - Drag'On
- Light prototypes winner: (Chile) Francisco Lopez Contardo (Chile) Juan Pablo Latrach Vinagre; EKS - South Racing
- UTVs winner: (United States) Austin Jones (Brazil) Gustavo Gugelmin; Can-Am Factory South Racing
- Trucks winner: Dmitry Sotnikov; Ruslan Akhmadeev; Ilgiz Akhmetzianov; Kamaz-Master
- Classics winner: (France) Serge Mogno (France) Florent Drulhon; Team FSO

The 2022 Dakar Rally was a rally raid event held in Saudi Arabia and the 44th edition of the Dakar Rally organized by Amaury Sport Organisation (ASO). The event took place between 1–14 January 2022. This was the third time Saudi Arabia had hosted the event, with support from the Saudi Automobile and Motorcycle Federation. The race started in Ha'il and ended in Jeddah, going through canyons and cliffs in the Neom region, passing by the Red Sea coastline, into the stretches of dunes surrounding Riyadh, with a lot more action on sand dunes in the Empty Quarter. The route consisted of one prologue stage and 12 normal stages, with one rest day in Riyadh on 8 January.

When ASO signed the five-year deal with Saudi Arabia, there was a first-year exclusivity clause. Since it has expired, more countries could have been added to the route. However, due to COVID-19 travel restrictions, a decision has been made to remain entirely within Saudi Arabia.

In 2021, the FIA World Motor Sport Council granted full World Championship status to the FIA's cross-country rallying discipline. On 5 December 2021, the FIA and FIM jointly combined both of their cross-country rally championships to form the World Rally-Raid Championship, which is co-sponsored by both organizations. The 2022 Dakar Rally served as the first event in the inaugural championship calendar.

== Summary ==
=== The route ===
The feedback from competitors about previous event was that there were too many rocky surfaces resulting in excessive tyre wear and punctures, and not enough sandy stages which traditionally dominated Dakar rally. The organizers listened to the complaints and on 11 May 2021 revealed a new route which is characterized by a push into the sandy Empty Quarter. Same as last year, the route includes 1 Prologue stage, 12 stages including 2 loop stages and 1 marathon stage. The route consists of around 4,000 km (2,500 mi) of special stages and 2,500 km (1,600 mi) - 3,000 km (1,900 mi) of liaisons. The exact route was revealed in late November 2021. The route did not feature the Empty Quarter this year. Initially, due to very difficult terrain, the competitors were planned to be airlifted from stage 8 finish to Riyadh.

=== Changes ===
Although initially promoted, last year's event did not have alternative fuels class, and only had several participants running on fuels different from petrol or diesel. In this edition there is a stronger push to low-carbon vehicles, with an aim to have 100% low-carbon vehicles in the car, SSV and truck categories by 2030. This edition will include a new T1-E category, with rules drawn up in collaboration with the FIA. This category has been created for prototype vehicles relying on electric motors or any technology focused on reducing carbon emissions, such as biofuels and hydrogen. Audi Sport announced that it will enter three Audi RS Q e-tron to T1-E category. Driven by Carlos Sainz, Stéphane Peterhansel and Mattias Ekström, Audi Sport has set target of winning the rally. In truck category, Hino announced support in building a hybrid vehicle that will enter the event.

Pioneering the new T1.E class, Audi demanded tyre inflation-deflation system in the cockpit, a larger chassis, buggy-sized wheels (17 inches) and more suspension travel than the 4x4s in T1.1 category. Prodrive and Toyota Gazoo Racing teams objected, which forced the organizers to open up the possibility of a new T1+ category. Cars in this category will be 4x4s, will have a 2.3 m (7 ft 7 in) wide chassis (instead of the current 2 m (6 ft 7 in)), 350 mm (14 in) of suspension travel (instead of the current 280 mm (11 in)) and 37 in wheels (instead of 32 in). The maximum weight will be increased by 100 kg (220 lb) to 1,950 kg (4,300 lb). The tyre inflation-deflation system controllable from the cockpit will remain exclusive to category T1.3 two-wheel drive buggies and the new T1-E hybrid or electric vehicles, "to optimise their energy consumption".

In order to balance the performance balance between factory teams, the organizers ASO and the FIA will continue using air restrictors. The diameters are still under review. Currently, Toyota's twin-turbo V6 petrol engine has a 37 mm (1.5 in) air restrictor, the turbo-diesel engine in the X-Raid Mini buggy has a 39 mm (1.5 in) air restrictor. Prodrive's twin-turbo V6 petrol engine is electronically limited by a power curve equal to the Toyota's.

Electronic roadbooks will become standard to all vehicles from the car, SSV and truck categories with a view of limiting the differences in assistance resources between the teams. The motorbikes and quads entered in the elite category will also get a version that has been adapted for them.

Bike and quad rider airbag vests introduced last year have received positive feedback. Airbag vest effectiveness and comfort have been improved.

In the Dakar Classic, the regularity will no longer be the only evaluation criteria. On portions representing roughly 20% of the route, only navigation will be judged and not time, and each excess kilometre covered will cost points.

=== Race ===
The 2022 Dakar Rally started on 1 January at Jeddah, with a prologue of 19 km, officially called stage 1A. For the motos only, the stage 1A times were multiplied by 5. Gas Gas entered the Dakar stage winners with a victory by Daniel Sanders, although Gas Gas used KTM 450 Rally bikes. Skyler Howes and José Ignacio Cornejo lost a lot of time on stage 1A and were more than 8 minutes behind the leader. In the cars Guerlain Chicherit in a GCK Thunder buggy running on bio-ethanol fuel had problems with instrumentation and stopped on track.

On 2 January, just before the start of the race, it was announced that to heavy rains that flowed the bivouac, there wouldn't be any marathon stages in stage 2 and 3, but regular stages (with assistance park). On stage 1B navigation was an issue and lots of drivers lost a significant amount of time finding a way point including, Ricky Brabec, Luciano and Kevin Benavides, Andrew Short, Juan Barreda, Toby Price, Maciej Giemza on bikes who lost between 30 and 50 minutes each on this waypoint. Bad day for new Audi RS Q: Stephane Peterhansel had a crash and lost more than 7 hours, Mattias Ekstrom more than 1.5 hours, and Carlos Sainz more than 2 hours finding a waypoint in last 100 km which led him to make some criticism to organization. Giniel de Villiers had an incident with the bike rider César Zumaran and later was awarded a 5 minutes penalty for not stopping to check for the health of the other competitor, breaching the sport regulations. On 4 January it was announced that another incident involving de Villiers was under investigation by running over Mohamedsaid Aoulad Ali's bike when climbing a dune, rendering it unusable, de Villiers circled around to check on the status of the rider, but again did not stop to offer assistance. He was given another time penalty, this time of 5 hours.

Also on stage 2, Loeb secured the victory on cars. In T3 category, the leader Seth Quintero had mechanical issues on that made him to penalize and being away from the fight for the final victory. In the following stage, Quintero would take advantage of his start from behind and secure another stage win.

On stage 3 maiden victories for Hero with Joaquim Rodrigues on bikes, and Carlos Sainz with his Audi RS Q e-tron, the first victory on Dakar of an hybrid vehicle. On T4 category WRC driver Andreas Mikkelsen had to retire after a crash.

Stage 4 and another victory for Nasser Al-Attiyah while Benediktas Vanagas in another Hilux T1+ suffered a rollover on stage and had to retire.

Stages 5 and 6 had different routes for FIM (Bikes and Quads), and FIA (Cars, Light weight, SSVs and trucks competitors. Stage 5 for bikes and quads had to be partially neutralized due to the high number os competitors needing assistance, meaning no rescue helicopters were available in the final sector of the stage. The riders who didn't concluded the stage, were given a standard time. In quads only one driver reached the end before neutralization was called. Danilo Petrucci made history being the first MotoGP rider to win a Dakar stage. Skyler Howes had to retire due to a head concussion while Joan Barreda had struggles to finish the stage but manage to start stage 6.

Stage 6 for bikes and quads was also neutralized after the first waypoint at km 101 due to rough track caused by heavy rain and the passage of cars and trucks in the day before. Neutralization came after quad rider Manuel Andújar crashed heavily in truck ruts, damaging the quad beyond repair. Andújar himself was in a state of shock, but otherwise okay.

== Entry list ==
=== Number of entries ===
Stage	Bikes	Quads	Cars	SxS–T3	UTV–T4	Trucks	Total	Classic Cars	Classic Trucks	Total Dakar Classic
Entry list (Note: As of 26 November, before scrutineering)	149	21	97	44	61	58	430	128	20	148
At start line	144	20	92	49	48	56	409	122	20	142
Rest day (Note: At start line after the rest day)	137	12	84	43	47	56	379	122	16	138
Finished (Note: To rank in the final standings, the vehicle had to pass through the finishing podium.) (Note: There was no Dakar Experience category this year. As the Dakar Rally became a FIA event, the vehicles that failed to finish a stage could still continue at the next, having taken a time penalty.)	124	7	75 (Note: Includes 3 Open category finishers)	37	44	33	320	117	12	129

=== Vehicles and Categories ===
Category	Bikes		Quads		Cars		SxS–T3		UTVs–T4		Trucks		Classic Cars		Classic Trucks	
	Class	Description	Class	Description	Class	Description	Class	Description	Class	Description	Class	Description	Class	Description	Class	Description
	RallyGP	A.S.O. "Elite"			T1.U	T1 electric/hybrid 4x4 modified	T3	Light Prototypes	T4	Production SSVs turbo	Truck>10,000cc	Production Trucks	-87 Low Average	TBC	-97 Low Average	TBC
	Rally2	"Non-Elite" Super-Production			T1.1	T1 petrol/diesel 4x4 modified							-87 Intermediate Average	TBC	-100 Low Average	TBC
					T1.2	T1 petrol/diesel 2WD modified							97 Low Average	TBC	e-87 Low Average	TBC
					T2	T2 Production							97 Intermediate Average	TBC		
													97 High Average	TBC		
													100 Intermediate Average	TBC		
													100 High Average	TBC		

A total of 750 riders, drivers and co-drivers entered the event, among them 209 rookies (first-time entries), 130 legends (participating for the 10th or more years), 34 original by Motul (riders without support team) and 60 women. Another 315 drivers and co-drivers entered the Dakar Classic (classic car and truck categories). Five vehicles compete in the Open category (3 in T1, 1 in T3 and 1 in T4)

=== Competitor list ===
Entry list — Bikes

Note
– The "Dakar Legends" - competitors that participated in 10 or more Dakar events.
– The first time starters - "rookies".
– Competitors that were not able to start the race.
– Competitors participating in "Original by Motul" — limited assistance marathon class.

No.	Driver	Bike	Team	Class
1	(Argentina) Kevin Benavides	KTM 450 Rally Factory Replica	Red Bull KTM Factory Team	RallyGP
2	(United States) Ricky Brabec	Honda CRF450 Rally	Monster Energy Honda Team 2022	RallyGP
3	(United Kingdom) Sam Sunderland	Gas Gas 450 Rally Factory Replica	Gas Gas Factory Team	RallyGP
4	(Australia) Daniel Sanders	Gas Gas 450 Rally Factory Replica	Gas Gas Factory Team	RallyGP
5	(United States) Skyler Howes	Husqvarna 450 Rally Factory Replica	Rockstar Energy Husqvarna Factory Racing	RallyGP
6	(South Africa) Aaron Mare	Hero 450 Rally	Hero Motosports Team Rally	RallyGP
7	(Chile) Pablo Quintanilla	Honda CRF450 Rally	Monster Energy Honda Team 2022	RallyGP
10	(Czech Republic) Martin Michek	KTM 450 Rally Replica	Orion - Moto Racing Group	RallyGP
11	(Chile) José Ignacio Cornejo	Honda CRF450 Rally	Monster Energy Honda Team 2022	RallyGP
12	(France) Xavier de Soultrait	Husqvarna FR 450 Rally	HT Rally Raid Husqvarna Racing	RallyGP
15	(Spain) Lorenzo Santolino	Sherco 450 SEF Rally	Sherco TVS Rally Factory	RallyGP
16	(Botswana) Ross Branch	Yamaha WR450F Rally	Monster Energy Yamaha Rally Team	RallyGP
17	(Spain) Juan Pedrero García	Rieju 450 Rally	Rieju - FN Speed Team	RallyGP
18	(Australia) Toby Price	KTM 450 Rally Factory Replica	Red Bull KTM Factory Team	RallyGP
19	(Portugal) Rui Gonçalves	Sherco 450 SEF Rally	Sherco TVS Rally Factory	RallyGP
20	(India) Harith Noah Koitha Veettil	Sherco 450 SEF Rally	Sherco TVS Rally Factory	RallyGP
21	(Czech Republic) Milan Engel	KTM 450 Rally Replica	Moto Racing Group (MRG)	Rally2
22	(Poland) Maciej Giemza	KTM 450 Rally Factory Replica	Orlen Team	RallyGP
23	(Czech Republic) Jan Brabec	KTM 450 Rally Replica	Strojrent Racing	Rally2
24	(France) Camille Chapeliere	KTM 450 Rally Factory Replica	Team Baïnes Rally	Rally2
26	(Poland) Konrad Dąbrowski	KTM 450 Rally Replica	Duust Rally Team	Rally2
27	(Portugal) Joaquim Rodrigues	Hero 450 Rally	Hero Motosports Team Rally	RallyGP
28	(China) Zaker Yakp	KTM 450 Rally Replica	Wu Pu Da Hai Dao Dakar Rally Team	Rally2
29	(United States) Andrew Short	Yamaha WR450F Rally	Monster Energy Yamaha Rally Team	RallyGP
30	(Portugal) Antonio Maio	Yamaha WR450F Rally	Franco Sport Yamaha Racing Team	RallyGP
31	(United Arab Emirates) Mohammed Balooshi	KTM 450 Rally	MX Ride Dubai	RallyGP
32	(Czech Republic) David Pabiška	Husqvarna 450 Rally Replica	Jantar Team S.R.O.	Rally2
33	(Portugal) Mario Patrão	KTM 450 Rally	Credito Agricola - Mario Patrão Motorsport	Rally2
34	(France) Mathieu Doveze	KTM 450 Rally Factory Replica	Nomade Racing	Rally2
35	(Mexico) Juan Pablo Guillen Rivera	KTM 450 Rally	Nómadas Adventure	Rally2
36	(Lithuania) Arūnas Gelažninkas	KTM 450 Rally Replica	#OrionDakarTeam	Rally2
37	(Romania) Emanuel Gyenes	KTM 450 Rally Replica	Autonet Motorcycle Team	Rally2
38	(Spain) Eduardo Iglesias Sánchez	KTM 450 Rally Factory Replica	Team Monforte Rally	Rally2
39	(France) Benjamin Melot	KTM 450 Rally Replica	Team Esprit KTM	Rally2
40	(Netherlands) Mirjam Pol	Husqvarna FR 450 Rally	HT Rally Raid Husqvarna Racing	Rally2
42	(France) Adrien Van Beveren	Yamaha WR450F Rally	Monster Energy Yamaha Rally Team	RallyGP
43	(United States) Mason Klein	KTM 450 Rally Replica	BAS Dakar KTM Racing Team	Rally2
44	(Slovenia) Simon Marčič	Husqvarna FR 450 Rally		Rally2
45	(China) Zhang Min	KTM 450 Rally Replica	Wu Pu Da Hai Dao Dakar Rally Team	Rally2
46	(Italy) Paolo Lucci	Husqvarna FR 450 Rally	Solarys Racing	Rally2
48	(China) Zhao Hongyi	KTM 450 Rally Replica	Wu Pu Da Hai Dao Dakar Rally Team	Rally2
49	(South Africa) Bradley Cox	KTM 450 Rally Factory Replica	BAS Dakar KTM Racing Team	Rally2
50	(Chile) Patricio Cabrera	KTM 450 Rally	Rieju - FN Speed Team	Rally2
51	(Spain) Rachid Al-Lal Lahadil	Husqvarna 450 Rally Replica	Melilla Sport Capital	Rally2
52	(Austria) Matthias Walkner	KTM 450 Rally Factory Replica	Red Bull KTM Factory Team	RallyGP
53	(France) Patrice Carillon	KTM 450 Rally		Rally2
54	(Bolivia) Daniel Nosiglia Jager	Rieju 450 Rally	Rieju - FN Speed Team	RallyGP
55	(Italy) Cesare Zacchetti	KTM 450 Rally		Rally2
56	(Belgium) Jerome Martiny	Husqvarna 450 Rally	Team Dumontier Racing	Rally2
57	(France) Philippe Cavelius	KTM 450 Rally Replica	Cavelius Team	Rally2
58	(Belgium) Mikaël Despontin	KTM 450 Rally	RS Concept	Rally2
59	(Colombia) Giordano Pacheco	KTM 450 Rally	Calidoso Racing Team	Rally2
60	(France) Stéphane Darques	Yamaha WR450F	M.O.R.AL	Rally2
61	(France) Norbert Dubois	KTM 450 Rally Replica	Aventure Moto 61	Rally2
62	(Australia) Andrew Joseph Houlihan	KTM 450 Rally Replica	Nomadas Adventure	Rally2
63	(Serbia) Gabor Saghmeister	KTM 450 Rally Replica	Saghmeister Team	Rally2
64	(France) Dominique Robin	KTM 450 Rally	Baines Moto	Rally2
65	(France) Guillaume Chollet	Yamaha WR450F	Drag'On Rally Team	Rally2
66	(Italy) Franco Picco	Fantic 450 Rally	Team Franco Picco	Rally2
67	(Belgium) Walter Roelants	Husqvarna FR 450 Rally Replica	HT Rally Raid Husqvarna Racing	Rally2
68	(Italy) Francesco Catanese	Honda RMH 450 RX	RS Moto Honda Racing Team	Rally2
70	(Kuwait) Mohammed Jaffar	KTM 450 Rally Replica	Duust Rally Team	Rally2
71	(Italy) Leonardo Tonelli	Husqvarna 450 Rally Factory Replica	ADR Africa Dream Racing	Rally2
72	(France) Philippe Gendron	KTM 450 Rally Replica	Nomade Racing	Rally2
73	(Italy) Tiziano Interno	Husqvarna 450 Rally Factory Replica	Rally POV	Rally2
75	(Kuwait) Abdullah Al-Shatti	KTM		Rally2
76	(France) Jean-Loup Lepan	KTM 450 Rally Replica	Nomade Racing	Rally2
77	(Argentina) Luciano Benavides	Husqvarna 450 Rally Factory Replica	Rockstar Energy Husqvarna Factory Racing	RallyGP
78	(France) Romain Dumontier	Husqvarna 450 Rally	Team Dumontier Racing	Rally2
79	(France) Amaury Baratin	KTM 450 Rally	Horizon Moto 95	Rally2
81	(France) Patrice Massador	KTM 450 Rally Replica	Team Giroud	Rally2
82	(Italy) Giovanni Stigliano	KTM 450 Rally Replica	Team JBRally	Rally2
83	(France) Julien Jagu	KTM 450 Rally Factory Replica	LG Rally Team	Rally2
84	(South Africa) Stuart Gregory	KTM 450 Rally Replica		Rally2
86	(France) Charlie Herbst	KTM 450 Rally Replica	Team All Tracks	Rally2
87	(South Africa) Walter Terblanche	KTM 450 Rally Replica	BAS Dakar KTM Racing Team	Rally2
88	(Spain) Joan Barreda	Honda CRF450 Rally	Monster Energy Honda Team 2022	RallyGP
90	(Italy) Danilo Petrucci	KTM 450 Rally Factory Replica	Tech3 KTM Factory Racing	Rally2
91	(Germany) Mike Wiedemann	KTM 450 Rally Replica	BAS Dakar KTM Racing Team	Rally2
92	(Italy) Lorenzo Piolini	KTM 450 Rally Replica	Caravanserraglio Rally Racing Team	Rally2
93	(Italy) Giovanni Gritti	Honda 450 Rally RX RS	RS Moto Racing Team	Rally2
95	(Netherlands) Wiljan Van Wikselaar	KTM 450EXC	BAS Dakar KTM Racing Team	Rally2
96	(Portugal) Alexandre Azinhais	KTM 450 Rally	Club Aventura Touareg	Rally2
97	(Argentina) Matias Notti	KTM 450 Rally	MAN Team	Rally2
98	(Spain) Sara García	Yamaha WR450F Rally	Pont Grup Yamaha	Rally2
99	(Spain) Javi Vega	Yamaha WR450F Rally	Pont Grup Yamaha	Rally2
100	(France) Audrey Rossat	KTM EXCF		Rally2
101	(Morocco) Harite Gabari	KTM 450 Rally Replica	Morocco Racing Team	Rally2
103	(France) Fabrice Chirent	KTM 450EXCF	Team Fabaventure	Rally2
106	(France) Bertrand Gavard	KTM 450 Rally Replica	Team RS Concept	Rally2
107	(Canada) Jack Lundin	Husqvarna FR 450 Rally	HT Rally Raid Husqvarna Racing	Rally2
108	(Spain) Marc Calmet	Rieju 450 Rally	Rieju - FN Speed Team	Rally2
109	(Mongolia) Lkhamaa Namchin	KTM 450 Rally Replica	Team Lkhamaa	Rally2
111	(Mexico) Antonio Vicente Guillen Rivera	KTM 500 EXC-F	Nomadas Adventure	Rally2
112	(Spain) José Arvest Portero	KTM 450 Rally	Arvi Portero Arfsten	Rally2
114	(Belgium) Mathieu Liebaert	KTM 450 Rally Factory Replica	BAS Dakar KTM Racing Team	Rally2
115	(Botswana) John Kelly	KTM 450 Rally Replica	Lyndon Poskitt Racing	Rally2
116	(Switzerland) Nicolas Monnin	Honda 450 RX	RS Moto	Rally2
119	(Italy) Domenico Cipollone	KTM 450 Rally Factory Replica	Terrerosse	Rally2
120	(France) Jeremy Poncet	Husqvarna 450 RFR	Xtrem Garage	Rally2
121	(Italy) Lorenzo Maria Fanottoli	Husqvarna 450 Rally Replica	Joyride Race Service	Rally2
122	(Argentina) Diego Noras	Husqvarna FR 450 Rally	HT Rally Raid Husqvarna Racing	Rally2
123	(South Africa) Charan Moore	KTM 450 Rally Replica	Xtrem Garage	Rally2
124	(France) Roch Wolville	Husqvarna 450 Rally	RS Concept	Rally2
125	(France) Edouard Leconte	KTM 450 Rally Replica	Team Dumontier Racing	Rally2
126	(United Kingdom) Simon Hewitt	Yamaha WR450F	Drag'On Rally Team	Rally2
127	(France) Sebastien Cojean	Husqvarna FE450		Rally2
128	(Spain) Sandra Gómez	Husqvarna 450 Rally Replica	XRaids Clinicas Cres	Rally2
129	(France) David Gaits	KTM 450 Rally	Happyness Racing JBS Moto	Rally2
130	(United Kingdom) David Mabbs	KTM 450 Rally	Vendetta Racing	Rally2
131	(United Kingdom) David McBride	Husqvarna 450 Rally	Vendetta Racing	Rally2
132	(France) Kevin Durand	Honda CRF450RX Rally RS	RS Moto Racing Team	Rally2
133	(France) Julien Barthélémy	Honda CRF450RX Rally RS	RS Moto Racing Team	Rally2
134	(Spain) Isaac Feliu	KTM 450 Rally Replica	TwinTrail Racing Team	Rally2
135	(Spain) Carles Falcon	KTM 450 Rally Replica	TwinTrail Racing Team	Rally2
136	(Spain) Albert Martin Garcia	Husqvarna 450 Rally Replica	TwinTrail Racing Team	Rally2
138	(France) Romain Leloup	KTM 450 Rally Factory Replica	Team Repar'Stores	Rally2
139	(France) Jonathan Chotard	KTM 450 Rally Replica	Juracing Team	Rally2
140	(Spain) José Maria Garcia Dominguez	BMW G450X Rally	Club Aventura Touareg	Rally2
142	(Slovakia) Štefan Svitko	KTM 450 Factory Rally Replica	Slovnaft Rally Team	RallyGP
143	(Ecuador) Juan Puga	Husqvarna 450 Rally Replica	Puga Team	Rally2
144	(Ecuador) Juan Carlos Puga Davila	Husqvarna 450 Rally Replica	Puga Team	Rally2
146	(Italy) Elio Aglioni	KTM 450 Rally Factory Replica	Agif Al Aviv	Rally2
147	(Greece) Vasileios Boudros	Husqvarna 450 Rally	Nomadas Adventure	Rally2
148	(France) Martin Bonnet	Husqvarna 450 Rally Factory Replica	RS Concept	Rally2
149	(Austria) Wolfgang Payr	KTM 450 Rally Factory Replica	Klymciw Racing	Rally2
150	(Netherlands) Bram Van der Wouden	Sherco 450 SEF Rally		Rally2
151	(Germany) Stephan Preuss	KTM 450 Rally	Reality Beats Fiction Racing Team	Rally2
152	(Germany) Thomas Preuss	KTM 450 Rally	Reality Beats Fiction Racing Team	Rally2
153	(South Africa) Werner Kennedy	KTM		Rally2
154	(Chile) John William Medina Salazar	KTM 450 Rally Replica	XRaids Experience	Rally2
155	(Argentina) Joaquin Debeljuh Taruselli	KTM 450 Rally Replica	XRaids Experience	Rally2
156	(Italy) Andrea Giuseppe Fili Winkler	KTM 450 Rally Factory Replica	Team Motoclub Yashica	Rally2
157	(Italy) Aldo Winkler	KTM 450 Rally Factory Replica	Team Motoclub Yashica	Rally2
158	(Argentina) Diego Gamaliel Llanos	KTM 450 Rally Replica	XRaids Experience	Rally2
159	(Ecuador) Alex Mauricio Cueva Ojeda	KTM 450 Rally Replica	XRaids Experience	Rally2
160	(Chile) Cesar Zumaran	Husqvarna 450 Rally Replica		Rally2
161	(Mongolia) Battur Baatar	KTM 450 Rally	Kuwait Motorsports Club	Rally2
162	(Morocco) Ali Oukerbouch	KTM 450 Rally Replica	Morocco Racing Team	Rally2
163	(Morocco) Mohamedsaid Aoulad Ali	KTM 450 Rally Replica	Morocco Racing Team	Rally2
165	(Portugal) Arcélio Couto	Honda CRF450RX	Team Bianchi Prata - Honda	Rally2
166	(Mozambique) Paulo Oliveira	KTM 450 Rally	Mario Patrão Motorsport	Rally2
167	(Portugal) Pedro Bianchi Prata	Honda CRF450R	Team Bianchi Prata - Honda	Rally2
168	(France) Samuel Fremy	KTM 450 Rally	Nomade Racing	Rally2

Entry list — Quads

Note
– The "Dakar Legends" - competitors that participated in 10 or more Dakar events.
– The first time starters - "rookies".
– Competitors that were not able to start the race.
– Competitors participating in "Original by Motul" — limited assistance marathon class.

No.	Driver	Quad	Team
170	(Argentina) Manuel Andújar	Yamaha YFM 700R	7240 Team
171	(Chile) Giovanni Enrico	Yamaha Raptor 700	Enrico Racing Team
173	(United States) Pablo Copetti	Yamaha Raptor	Del Amo Motorsports/Yamaha Rally Team
174	(France) Alexandre Giroud	Yamaha YFZ 700	Yamaha Racing - SMX - Drag'On
175	(Poland) Kamil Wiśniewski	Yamaha Raptor 700	Orlen Team
176	(Czech Republic) Tomáš Kubiena	Yamaha YFM 700R	Story Racing S.R.O.
179	(Lithuania) Laisvydas Kancius	Yamaha YFM 700	Story Racing S.R.O.
180	(Paraguay) Nelson Augusto Sanabria Galeano	Yamaha YFM 700R SE	Med de Argentina
181	(France) Sebastien Souday	Yamaha Raptor	Team All Tracks
182	(Colombia) Nicolas Robledo Serna	Can-Am Renegade X XC850	Equipo Colombia 4X4
183	(Brazil) Marcelo Medeiros	Yamaha YFM 700R	Team Marcelo Medeiros
184	(Spain) Toni Vingut	Yamaha Raptor 700	Visit Sant Antoni - Ibiza
185	(Czech Republic) Zdeněk Tůma	Yamaha RR 700	Barth Racing Team
186	(Argentina) Carlos Alejandro Verza	Yamaha YFM 700R	Verza Rally Team
187	(Chile) Italo Pedemonte	Yamaha YFM 700R SE	Enrico Racing Team
188	(France) Vincent Padrona	Yamaha Raptor 700	Drag'On Rally Team
192	(Argentina) Francisco Moreno	Yamaha Raptor 700	Drag'On Rally Team
193	Aleksandr Maksimov (Note: All the following drivers are Russian, but will compete under a neutral flag as the Court of Arbitration for Sport upheld a ban on Russia competing at World Championships. The ban was implemented by the World Anti-Doping Agency in response to state-sponsored doping program of Russian athletes.)	Yamaha YFM 700R	Chyr Mari
194	(France) Nicolas Martinez	Yamaha Raptor 700	Drag'On Rally Team
195	(Spain) Àlex Feliu	Can-Am Renegade 1000 XXC	Àlex Feliu Competición

Entry list — Cars

Note
– The "Dakar Legends" - competitors that participated in 10 or more Dakar events.
– The first time starters - "rookies".
– Competitors that were not able to start the race.

No.	Driver	Co-driver	Vehicle	Team	Class
200	(France) Stéphane Peterhansel	(France) Édouard Boulanger	Audi RS Q e-tron	Audi Q Motorsport	T1.U
201	(Qatar) Nasser Al-Attiyah	(France) Mathieu Baumel	Toyota GR DKR Hilux	Toyota Gazoo Racing	T1.1
202	(Spain) Carlos Sainz	(Spain) Lucas Cruz	Audi RS Q e-tron	Audi Q Motorsport	T1.U
203	(Poland) Jakub Przygoński	(Germany) Timo Gottschalk	Mini John Cooper Works Buggy	X-raid Orlen Team	T1.2
204	(Spain) Nani Roma	(Spain) Alex Haro Bravo	BRX Hunter T1+	Prodrive	T1.1
205	(Saudi Arabia) Yazeed Al-Rajhi	(United Kingdom) Michael Orr	Toyota Hilux Overdrive	Overdrive Toyota	T1.1
206	(United Arab Emirates) Khalid Al Qassimi	(Germany) Dirk von Zitzewitz	Peugeot 3008 DKR	Abu Dhabi Racing	T1.2
207	(South Africa) Giniel De Villiers	(South Africa) Dennis Murphy	Toyota GR DKR Hilux	Toyota Gazoo Racing	T1.1
208	Vladimir Vasilyev	(Latvia) Oleg Uperenko	BMW X5	VRT Team	T1.1
209	(Czech Republic) Martin Prokop	(Czech Republic) Viktor Chytka	Ford Raptor RS Cross Country	Benzina Orlen Team	T1.1
210	(France) Cyril Despres	(Germany) Taye Perry	Peugeot 3008	Rebellion & Hexaom	T1.2
211	(France) Sébastien Loeb	(Belgium) Fabian Lurquin	BRX Hunter T1+	Prodrive	T1.1
212	(France) Mathieu Serradori	(France) Loic Minaudier	Century CR6	SRT Racing	T1.2
213	(China) Guoyu Zhang	(China) Hongyu Pan	BAIC BJ40	BAIC ORV	T1.1
214	(France) Christian Lavieille	(France) Johnny Aubert	MD Rallye Sport Optimus	MD Rallye Sport	T1.2
215	(France) Romain Dumas	(France) Rémi Boulanger	Toyota Gazoo Racing Hilux	Rebellion Motors	T1.1
216	Denis Krotov	Konstantin Zhiltsov	Mini John Cooper Works Buggy	MSK Rally Team	T1.2
217	(Netherlands) Bernhard ten Brinke	(France) Sébastien Delaunay	Toyota Hilux Overdrive	Overdrive Toyota	T1.1
218	(Saudi Arabia) Yasir Seaidan	Alexey Kuzmich	Mini John Cooper Works Rally	YBS X-raid	T1.1
219	(Lithuania) Benediktas Vanagas	(Portugal) Filipe Palmeiro	Toyota Gazoo Racing Hilux	Toyota Gazoo Racing Baltics	T1.1
220	(China) Wei Han	(China) Li Ma	SMG HW2021	Quzhou Motorsport City Team	T1.2
221	(Argentina) Orlando Terranova	(Spain) Daniel Oliveras Carreras	BRX Hunter T1+	Prodrive	T1.1
222	(Argentina) Lucio Alvarez	(Spain) Armand Monleon	Toyota Hilux Overdrive	Overdrive Toyota	T1.1
223	(Argentina) Sebastian Halpern	(Argentina) Bernardo Graue	Mini John Cooper Works Buggy	X-raid Mini JCW Rally	T1.2
224	(Sweden) Mattias Ekström	(Sweden) Emil Bergkvist	Audi RS Q e-tron	Audi Q Motorsport	T1.U
225	(South Africa) Henk Lategan	(South Africa) Brett Cummings	Toyota GR DKR Hilux	Toyota Gazoo Racing	T1.1
226	(France) Guerlain Chicherit	(France) Alex Winocq	GCK Thunder	GCK Motorsport	T1.U
227	(France) Jérôme Pélichet	(France) Pascal Larroque	MD Rallye Sport Optimus	Raidlynx	T1.2
228	(Czech Republic) Miroslav Zapletal	(Slovakia) Marek Sýkora	Ford F150 Evo	Offroadsport	T1.1
229	(France) Ronan Chabot	(France) Gilles Pillot	Toyota Hilux Overdrive	Overdrive Toyota	T1.1
230	(South Africa) Brian Baragwanath	(South Africa) Leonard Cremer	Century CR6	Century Racing	T1.2
233	(South Africa) Shameer Variawa	(South Africa) Danie Stassen	Toyota GR DKR Hilux	Toyota Gazoo Racing	T1.1
234	(Lithuania) Vaidotas Žala	(Portugal) Paulo Fiúza	Mini John Cooper Works Rally	Teltonika Racing	T1.1
235	(France) Michael Pisano	(France) Max Delfino	MD Rallye Sport Optimus	MD Rallye Sport	T1.2
236	(France) Lionel Baud	(France) Jean-Pierre Garcin	Peugeot 3008 DKR	PH-Sport	T1.2
237	(Argentina) Juan Cruz Yacopini	(Argentina) Alejandro Miguel Yacopini	Toyota Hilux Overdrive	Overdrive Toyota	T1.1
238	(Spain) Laia Sanz	(Italy) Maurizio Gerini	Mini All4 Racing	X-raid Mini JCW Rally	T1.1
239	(Spain) Carlos Checa	(Spain) Ferran Marco Alcayna	MD Rallye Sport Optimus	MD Rallye Sport	T1.2
240	(Portugal) Miguel Barbosa	(Peru) Pedro Velosa	Toyota Hilux Overdrive	Overdrive Toyota	T1.1
241	(Lithuania) Antanas Juknevičius	(Latvia) Didzis Zariņš	Toyota Hilux 2016 IRS	Kreda	T1.1
242	(Japan) Akira Miura	(France) Laurent Lichtleuchter	Toyota Land Cruiser VDJ200	Toyota Auto Body	T2
243	(France) Pierre Lachaume	(France) Stephane Duple	MD Rallye Sport Optimus	MD Rallye Sport	T1.2
244	(United Arab Emirates) Khalid Aljafla	(Belgium) Charly Gotlib	Toyota Hilux	Aljafla Racing	T1.1
245	(France) Ronald Basso	(France) Jean Michel Polato	Toyota Land Cruiser VDJ200	Toyota Auto Body	T2
246	(Belgium) Erwin Imschoot	(Belgium) Olivier Imschoot	MD Rallye Sport Optimus	MD Rallye Sport	T1.2
247	(Netherlands) Tim Coronel	(Netherlands) Tom Coronel	Century CR6	Maxxis DakarTeam	T1.2
248	(Spain) Isidre Esteve Pujol	(Spain) Txema Villalobos	Toyota Hilux Overdrive	Repsol Rally Team	T1.1
249	(Spain) Óscar Fuertes Aldanondo	(Spain) Diego Vallejo	Century CR6	Astara Team	T1.2
250	(Belgium) Alexandre Leroy	(France) Nicolas Delangue	Century CR6	SRT Racing	T1.2
251	(Switzerland) Alexandre Pesci	(Switzerland) Stephan Kuhni	Rebellion DXX	Rebellion Motors	T1.2
252	(Lithuania) Gintas Petrus	(Lithuania) Šarūnas Paliokas	MD Rallye Sport Optimus Evo3	Petrus Kombucha Team	T1.2
253	(South Africa) Christiaan Visser	(South Africa) Rodney Burke	Century CR6	Century Racing	T1.2
254	(France) Jean Remy Bergounhe	(France) Gérard Dubuy	MD Rallye Sport Optimus	MD Rallye Sport	T1.2
256	(Spain) Jesús Calleja	(Spain) Edu Blanco	Century CR6	Astara Team	T1.2
257	(Spain) Manuel Plaza Pérez	(Spain) Monica Plaza Vazquez	Chevrolet Sodicars BV2	Sodicars Racing	T1.2
258	(Kazakhstan) Andrey Cherednikov	(Kazakhstan) Meiram Tleukhan	Ford F150 Evo	Offroadsport	T1.1
259	(France) Jean Pierre Strugo	(France) François Borsotto	MD Rallye Sport Optimus	MD Rallye Sport	T1.2
261	(France) Patrice Garrouste	(France) Jeremy Caszalot	Chevrolet Sodicars Buggy	Sodicars Racing	T1.1
263	(France) François Cousin	(France) Stéphane Cousin	MD Rallye Sport Optimus	Compagnie Des Dunes	T1.2
264	(Paraguay) Andrea Lafarja	(Argentina) Eugenio Andres Arrieta	Borgward BX7 Evo	Puma Energy Rally Team	T1.1
265	(Germany) Markus Walcher	(Germany) Stephan Stensky	Nissan VK56	Ravenol Motorsport / Walcher Racing Team	T1.1
266	(France) Yves Fromont	(France) Jean Fromont	Volkswagen Original	Fromont MMO Les Lyonnais	T1.2
267	(Germany) Daniel Schröder	(South Africa) Ryan Bland	Nissan Navara VK50	Jürgen Schröder	T1.1
268	(Italy) Andrea Schiumarini	(Italy) Stefano Sinibaldi	Mitsubishi Pajero WRC Plus	R Team	T1.1
269	(France) Patrick Martin	(France) Lucas Martin	Volkswagen Tarek	Team MMO Les Lyonnais	T1.2
270	(France) Hugues Moilet	(France) Antoine Galland	Fouquet Chevrolet FC2	Off Road Concept	T1.1
271	(South Africa) Schalk Burger	(South Africa) Henk Janse Van Vuuren	Century CR6	Century Racing	T1.2
272	(Italy) Silvio Totani	(Italy) Tito Totani	Nissan Patrol Y61 4.8	Motortecnica Racing Team	T1.1
273	(China) Po Tian	(China) Xuanyi Du	SMG HW2021	Quzhou Motorsport City Team	T1.2
274	(Spain) Jesus Manuel Henriquez Navarro	(Italy) Filippo Ippolito	Dakar Enduro	Maximus	T1.1
275	(Spain) Jordi Queralto	(Czech Republic) Petra Zemankova	Jeep Wrangler	Krestex Team	T1.1
276	(France) Thierry Richard	(France) Franck Maldonado	BMW EG21A4F Sodicars	Sodicars Racing	T1.1
277	(Netherlands) Maik Willems	(Netherlands) Robert Van Pelt	Toyota Hilux Overdrive	Bastion Hotels Dakar Team	T1.1
278	(Brazil) Marcelo Tiglia Gastaldi	(Brazil) Cadu Sachs	Century CR6	Century Racing	T1.2
279	(France) Maxime Lacarrau	(France) Frederic Becart	Toyota Land Cruiser KDJ 120	Team SSP	T2
280	(Spain) Jose Manuel Salinero	(Spain) Cristian Lopez Vigara	Nissan Proto	Krestex Team	T1.1
281	(France) Pierre-Guy Cellerier	(France) Franck Cellerier	Bowler	Team MMO Les Lyonnais	T1.1
283	(France) Antoine Delaporte	(France) Yoann François	Chevrolet LCR30	Off Road Concept	T1.2
284	(France) Laurent Ducreux	(France) Philippe Cantreau	Bowler Wildcat	Team MMO Les Lyonnais	T1.1
285	(France) Hervé Quinet	(France) Marie-Laure Quinet	Rally Raid UK Desert Warrior	Les Clérimois Auto Sport	T1.1
286	(South Africa) Ernest Roberts	(South Africa) Henry Kohne	Century CR6	Century Racing	T1.2
287	(Romania) Iacob Ilie Buhai Hotea	(Romania) Turdean Tudor	Toyota Hilux	Iacob Buhai	T1.1
289	(Romania) Mihai Ban	(Romania) Stefan Catalin Ion	Hummer H3	Transilvania Rally RIA Team	T1.1
291	(Saudi Arabia) Ibrahm Almuhna	(Saudi Arabia) Osama Alsanad	Toyota FJ Cruiser	Ibrahm Almuhna	T1.1
292	(Netherlands) Henri Vansteenbergen	(Netherlands) Eyck Willemse	Rally Raid UK Oryx DW	Oryx Rallysport	T1.1
293	(France) Jean-Philippe Beziat	(France) Vincent Albira	Toyota Hilux Overdrive	MD Rallye Sport	T1.1
294	(France) Philippe Raud	(France) Maxime Raud	Toyota Land Cruiser	Sodicars Racing	T2
295	(France) Marco Piana	(France) Nicolas Garnier	Toyota Land Cruiser	Xtremeplus Polaris Factory Team	T1.1
296	(France) Christophe Girard	(France) Renaud Niveau	Toyota Land Cruiser HDJ100	STA Competition	T2
600	(France) Gerard Tramoni	(France) Dominique Totain	Oryx Sadev	Team 100% Sud Ouest	T1.2
601	(United Kingdom) Andrew Wicklow	(United Kingdom) Quin Evans	Bowler Bulldog	Team Bowler	T1.1
633	(Saudi Arabia) Mohamad Altwijri	(Saudi Arabia) Yasser Alhajjaj	Toyota Land Cruiser	Altwijri Racing Team	T2

Entry list — Light Prototypes

Note
– The "Dakar Legends" - competitors that participated in 10 or more Dakar events.
– The first time starters - "rookies".
– Competitors that were not able to start the race.

No.	Driver	Co-driver	Vehicle	Team
300	(Czech Republic) Josef Macháček	(Czech Republic) Pavel Vyoral	Buggyra Can-Am DV12	Buggyra Zero Mileage Racing
301	(Spain) Cristina Gutiérrez	(France) Francois Cazalet	OT3 - 01	Red Bull Off-Road Team USA
302	(France) Philippe Pinchedez	(France) Thomas Gaidella	Can-Am T3RR	Pinch Racing
303	(United States) Seth Quintero	(Germany) Dennis Zenz	OT3 - 02	Red Bull Off-Road Junior Team USA
304	(Norway) Andreas Mikkelsen	(Norway) Ola Fløene	OT3 - 03	Red Bull Off-Road Junior Team USA
305	(Chile) Francisco Lopez Contardo	(Chile) Juan Pablo Latrach Vinagre	Can-Am XRS	EKS - South Racing
306	(Sweden) Sebastian Eriksson	(Netherlands) Wouter Rosegaar	Can-Am Maverick X3	EKS - South Racing
307	(France) Jean-Luc Pisson	(France) Jean Brucy	PH-Sport Zephyr	JLT Racing
308	(Belgium) Guillaume De Mévius	(United States) Kellon Walch	OT3 - 04	Red Bull Off-Road Team USA
309	(Spain) Fernando Álvarez	(France) Xavier Panseri	Can-Am Maverick X3	South Racing Can-Am
310	(Saudi Arabia) Dania Akeel	(Uruguay) Sergio Lafuente	Can-Am Maverick X3	South Racing Middle East
311	(Italy) Camelia Liparoti	(Spain) Xavier Blanco	Yamaha YXZ 1000R Rally Edition	Yamaha powered by X-Raid Team
312	Pavel Lebedev	Kirill Shubin	Can-Am Maverick	MSK Rally Team
313	(Saudi Arabia) Saleh Alsaif	(Spain) Oriol Vidal Montijano	Can-Am X3 T3 Pro	Black Horse Team
314	(Spain) Santiago Navarro	(Spain) Marc Solà	Can-Am Maverick X3	FN Speed Team
315	Boris Gadasin	Dmitry Pavlov	G-Force T3GF	G-Force Motorsport
316	(France) Lionel Costes	(France) Christophe Tressens	PH-Sport Zephyr	PH-Sport Dans Les Pas de Léa
319	(United Kingdom) Thomas Bell	(Argentina) Bruno Jacomy	Can-Am Maverick X3	South Racing Middle East
320	Andrey Novikov	Dmitrii Kozhukhov	G-Force T3GF	G-Force Motorsport
321	(Germany) Annett Fischer	(Sweden) Annie Seel	Yamaha YXZ 1000R Rally Edition	Yamaha powered by X-Raid Team
322	(France) Matthieu Margaillan	(France) Axelle Roux-Decima	Can-Am	Rally Raid Comcept
323	Maria Oparina	(Belarus) Andrei Rudnitski	Can-Am	Team Maria Oparina
324	(Portugal) Mario Franco	(Portugal) Rui Franco	Yamaha YXZ 1000R	Francosport
325	(France) Jean - Pascal Besson	(France) Patrice Roissac	Kinroad XT250GK	Rally Raid Comcept
326	(Spain) Javier Herrador Calatrava	(Spain) José Lus Rosa Olivera	Herrator Inzane X3	Herrador Factory Racing
327	(France) Romain Locmane	(France) Maxime Fourmaux	Can-Am Maverick XRS	Quad Bike Evasion
328	(France) Axel Alletru	(Belgium) Francois Beguin	BRP Can-Am X3	Team Allétru's Mercier Racing Car
329	(France) Geoffrey Moreau	(France) Pascal Chassant	MMP Can-Am	MMP
330	(France) Patrick Becquart	(France) Romain Becquart	Can-Am Maverick X3 XDS	Mercier
331	(Qatar) Ahmed Alkuwari Fahad	(Qatar) Nasser Alkuwari	Yamaha YXZ 1000R SS	Yamaha powered by X-Raid Team
332	(Saudi Arabia) Mashael AlObaidan	(Italy) Jacopo Cerutti	Can-Am Maverick X3	South Racing Middle East
333	(Italy) Marco Carrara	(Italy) Enrico Gaspari	PH-Sport Zephyr	PH-Sport
334	(France) Serge Gounon	(France) Pierre-Henri Michel	Can-Am XRS	Team BBR/Pole Position 77
335	(Ecuador) Sebastian Guayasamin	(Argentina) Ricardo Adrian Torlaschi	Can-Am X3	
336	(Chile) Luis Eguiguren	(Chile) Matias Vicuna	Herrator Inzane X3	Herrador Factory Team
337	(Spain) Xavier Foj	(Spain) Ignacio Santamaria	AMS Oryx	Foj Motorsport
338	(France) Thierry Porte	(France) Jerome Doudard	ORT Scorpion	MD Rallye Sport
339	(Netherlands) Michiel Becx	(Netherlands) Edwin Kuijpers	Arcane T3	Arcane Factory Racing
340	(Colombia) Javier Velez	(Colombia) Mateo Moreno Kristiansen	Can-Am Maverick X3	FN Speed Team
341	(France) Eric Croquelois	(France) Hugues Lapouille	Can-Am Maverick	Drag'On Rally Team
342	(Switzerland) Paolo Sottile	(Switzerland) Matteo Sottile	Can-Am X3	Team Sottile - BTR
343	(Spain) Jordi Segura	(Spain) Pedro Lopez Chaves	Can-Am Maverick X3	FN Speed Team
344	(Spain) Pedro Manuel Peñate Muñoz	(Spain) Rosa Romero Font	Can-Am Maverick X3 XRS	Valsebike Canarias
347	(France) Pascale Jaffrennou	(France) Françoise Hollender	Pinch Racing T3RR	Pinch Racing
348	(France) Hugues Matringhem	(France) Nicolas Tchidemian	Can-Am Maverick X3 XRS	Renonce Mercier Racing
349	(France) Gaspard Destailleur	(France) Jean-François Destailleur	Can-Am Maverick X3	Renonce Mercier Racing
350	(Netherlands) Hans Weijs	(Netherlands) Tim Rietveld	Arcane T3	Arcane Factory Racing
356	(Spain) Merce Marti	(Andorra) Margot Llobera	Can-Am Maverick X3	FN Speed Team
631	(Brazil) Jorge Wagenfuhr	(Brazil) Filipe Bianchini De Oliveira	SpeedUTV	Lifesil

Entry list — SSV

Note
– The "Dakar Legends" - competitors that participated in 10 or more Dakar events.
– The first time starters - "rookies".
– Late entries.
– Competitors that were not able to start the race.

No.	Driver	Co-driver	Vehicle	Team
401	(United States) Austin Jones	(Brazil) Gustavo Gugelmin	Can-Am XRS	Can-Am Factory South Racing
402	(Poland) Aron Domżała	(Poland) Maciej Marton	Can-Am XRS	Can-Am Factory South Racing
403	(Poland) Michał Goczał	(Poland) Szymon Gospodarczyk	Can-Am XRS	Cobant-Energylandia Rally Team
406	Sergei Kariakin	Anton Vlasiuk	BRP Can-Am Maverick	Snag Racing Team
408	(Australia) Molly Taylor	(Australia) Dale Moscatt	Can-Am Maverick XRS	Can-Am Factory South Racing
410	(Poland) Marek Goczał	(Poland) Lukasz Laskawiec	Can-Am XRS	Cobant-Energylandia Rally Team
414	(Lithuania) Rokas Baciuška	(Spain) Oriol Mena	Can-Am Maverick XRS	South Racing Can-Am
415	(Brazil) Rodrigo Luppi De Oliveira	(Brazil) Maykel Justo	Can-Am XRS	South Racing Can-Am
416	(Spain) Gerard Farrés	(Spain) Diego Ortega Gil	Can-Am Maverick XRS	Can-Am Factory South Racing
418	(Austria) Nicolas Brabeck-Letmathe	(Argentina) Ezequiel Fernandez Sasso	Can-Am X3	Team Casteu
420	(France) Eric Abel	(France) Christian Manez	Can-Am XRS	Team BBR/Pole Position 77
421	(Switzerland) Jerome de Sadeleer	(France) Michael Metge	Can-Am Maverick XRS	Team Galag
422	(France) Fabrice Lardon	(France) Bruno Bony	Can-Am 2019	Team Casteu
423	(Italy) Michele Cinotto	(Italy) Maurizio Dominella	Polaris Pro XP	Xtremeplus Polaris Factory Team
426	(Netherlands) Paul Spierings	(Netherlands) Jan-Pieter van der Stelt	Can-Am Maverick X3	Dakar Team Spierings
428	(Chile) Lucas Del Rio	(Chile) Americo Aliaga	Can-Am Maverick XRS	South Racing Can-Am
431	(France) Florent Vayssade	(France) Nicolas Rey	Can-Am BRP	Team Vayssade Florent
433	(France) Frederic Chesneau	(France) Stephane Chesneau	Can-Am Maverick X3	FS 21
437	(Italy) Pietro Cinotto	(Italy) Alberto Bertoldi	Polaris RZR Pro XP	Xtremeplus Polaris Factory Team
438	(Argentina) Pablo Macua	(Argentina) Mauro Esteban Lipez	Can-Am Sodicars Racing	Sodicars Racing
439	(Spain) Gael Queralt	(Spain) Sergi Brugue	Can-Am Maverick X3	FN Speed Team
441	(South Africa) Geoff Minnitt	(South Africa) Siegfried Rousseau	Can-Am Maverick X3	South Racing Can-Am
442	(France) Rudy Roquesalane	(France) Vincent Ferri	Can-Am X3	RRC Racing
443	(France) Baptiste Enjolras	(France) Julien Enjolras	Can-Am X3	Tati Team
444	(Portugal) Luis Portela Morais	(Portugal) David Megre	Can-Am X3 XRS	BP Ultimate SSv Team
445	(France) Jean-Claude Pla	(France) Jerome Pla	Polaris RZR Pro XP	Xtremeplus Polaris Factory Team
446	(Argentina) David Zille	(Argentina) Sebastian Cesana	Can-Am XRS	South Racing Can-Am
447	(Spain) Joan Lascorz	(Spain) Miguel Puertas Herrera	Can-Am Maverick X3	Buggy Masters Team
450	(France) Davy Huguet	(France) Nicolas Falloux	Can-Am XRS	Team BBR/Pole Position 77
451	(Ukraine) Ievgen Kovalevych	(Ukraine) Dmytro Tsyro	Can-Am	South Racing Can-Am
453	(Japan) Shinsuke Umeda	(Italy) David Giovannetti	Polaris RZR Pro XP	Xtremeplus Polaris Factory Team
454	(Netherlands) Gert-Jan Van Der Valk	(Netherlands) Branco De Lange	Can-Am XRS	South Racing Can-Am
455	(Portugal) Rui Oliveira	(Spain) Fausto Mota	Can-Am Maverick	CRN Competition Team
456	(France) Christophe Cresp	(France) Serge Henninot	MMP Can-Am	MMP
458	(France) Ulrich Caradot	(France) Mathieu Bouchut	Can-Am Bombardier	Team BBR/Pole Position 77
459	(Netherlands) André Thewessen	(Netherlands) Stijn Bastings	Can-Am Maverick X3	Team ATS
460	(France) Jeremy Poret	(France) Brice Aloth	Can-Am Maverick X3	Team BTR
461	(Netherlands) Jan De Wit	(Belgium) Serge Bruynkens	Can-Am Maverick X3	Team Roadseal Africa
462	(France) Patrice Etienne	(France) Jerome Bos	Can-Am X3	Ydeo Competition
463	(France) Benoit Fretin	(France) Cedric Duple	Can-Am X3	Ydeo Competition
464	(France) Bruno Fretin	(France) Valentin Sarreaud	Can-Am X3	Ydeo Competition
465	Tatiana Sycheva	Aleksandr Alekseev	BRP Maverick X3	Xesha Motorsport
466	(Mongolia) Aranzal Gerel	(Mongolia) Ganzorig Temuujin	Can-Am Maverick X3	Ayanga
467	(Lithuania) Tomas Jancys	(Lithuania) Irmantas Braziunas	Can-Am Maverick X3	Mediafon Team
468	(Spain) Josep Rojas Almuzara	(Spain) Joan Rubi Montserrat	Can-Am Maverick X3	Buggy Masters Team
469	(Netherlands) Jeffrey Otten	(Netherlands) Nicky Zoontjens	Can-Am Maverick X3	Gaia Motorsports
470	(France) Gregory Pichon	(France) Jean Pichon	Can-Am Maverick X3	Team Pichon Mercier Racing
632	(Italy) Dario De Lorenzo	(Italy) Aldo De Lorenzo	Polaris RZR 1000 E	Jazz Tech

Entry list — Trucks

Note
– The "Dakar Legends" - competitors that participated in 10 or more Dakar events.
– The first time starters - "rookies".
– Late entries.
– Competitors that were not able to start the race.

No.	Driver	Co-driver	Technician	Vehicle	Team	Class
500	Dmitry Sotnikov	Ruslan Akhmadeev	Ilgiz Akhmetzianov	Kamaz K5 435091	Kamaz-Master	Truck>10,000cc
501	Anton Shibalov	Dmitrii Nikitin	Ivan Tatarinov	Kamaz 43509	Kamaz-Master	Truck>10,000cc
503	(Czech Republic) Martin Macík	(Czech Republic) František Tomášek	(Czech Republic) David Švanda	Iveco PowerStar	Big Shock Racing	Truck>10,000cc
504	(Netherlands) Janus van Kasteren	(Netherlands) Marcel Snijders	(Poland) Darek Rodewald	Iveco PowerStar	Petronas Team De Rooy Iveco	Truck>10,000cc
505	Eduard Nikolaev	Evgenii Iakovlev	Vladimir Rybakov	Kamaz K5 435091	Kamaz-Master	Truck>10,000cc
506	(Netherlands) Martin van den Brink	(Belgium) Peter Willemsen	(Netherlands) Bernard Der Kinderen	Iveco PowerStar	Mammoet Rallysport Team De Rooy Iveco	Truck>10,000cc
508	(Czech Republic) Aleš Loprais	(Czech Republic) Petr Pokora	(Czech Republic) Jaroslav Valtr	Praga V4S DKR	Instaforex Loprais Praga	Truck>10,000cc
509	Andrey Karginov	Andrey Mokeev	Ivan Malkov	Kamaz 43509	Kamaz-Master	Truck>10,000cc
510	(Czech Republic) Martin Šoltys	(Czech Republic) Roman Krejčí	(Czech Republic) Jakub Jirinec	Iveco PowerStar	Big Shock Racing	Truck>10,000cc
511	(Chile) Ignacio Casale	(Chile) Alvaro Leon	(Czech Republic) Tomáš Šikola	Tatra Phoenix	Buggyra Racing Team	Truck>10,000cc
512	(Japan) Teruhito Sugawara	(Japan) Hirokazu Somemiya	(Japan) Yuji Mochizuki	Hino 600-Hybrid	Hino Team Sugawara	Truck>10,000cc
514	(Czech Republic) Tomáš Vrátný	(Czech Republic) Jaromír Martinec	(Poland) Bartłomiej Boba	Ford Cargo 4X4	Fesh Fesh Team	Truck>10,000cc
515	(Netherlands) Victor Willem Corne Versteijnen	(Netherlands) Teun Van Dal	(Netherlands) Randy Smits	Iveco PowerStar	Petronas Team De Rooy Iveco	Truck>10,000cc
516	(Netherlands) Gert Huzink	(Netherlands) Rob Buursen	(Netherlands) Martin Roesink	Renault C460 Hybrid	Riwald Dakar Team	Truck>10,000cc
518	(Netherlands) Pascal De Baar	(Belgium) Jan Van Der Vaet	(Netherlands) Stefan Slootjes	Renault K520	Riwald Dakar Team	Truck>10,000cc
519	(Andorra) Albert Llovera	(Spain) Jorge Salvador Coderch	(Spain) Marc Torres	Iveco	Fesh Fesh Team	Truck>10,000cc
520	(Netherlands) Kees Koolen	(Netherlands) Wouter De Graaff	(Netherlands) Gijsbert Van Uden	Iveco PowerStar	Big Shock Racing	Truck>10,000cc
521	(Argentina) Juan Manuel Silva	(Spain) Pau Navarro	(Argentina) Carlos Mel Banfi	MAN TGA	Puma Energy RallyTeam	Truck>10,000cc
522	(Netherlands) Richard De Groot	(Netherlands) Jan Hulsebosch	(Netherlands) Mark Laan	Iveco Magirus 4x4 DRNL	Firemen Dakar Team	Truck>10,000cc
523	(Netherlands) Maurik Van Den Heuvel	(Netherlands) Martijn Van Rooij	(Netherlands) Wilko Van Oort	International Scania LoneStar	Dakarspeed	Truck>10,000cc
524	(Netherlands) Mitchel Van Den Brink	(Netherlands) Rijk Mouw	(Netherlands) Bert Donkelaar	Iveco PowerStar	Petronas Team De Rooy Iveco	Truck>10,000cc
525	(Spain) Alberto Herrero	(Spain) Borja Rodríguez Rodríguez	(Spain) Mario Rodríguez	Scania Topedo	TH-Trucks	Truck>10,000cc
526	(Germany) Mathias Behringer	(Netherlands) Hugo Kupper	(Germany) Robert Striebe	MAN	Q Motorsport Team	Truck>10,000cc
527	(Netherlands) William De Groot	(Netherlands) Tom Brekelmans	(Netherlands) Remon Van Der Steen	DAF FT XF105	De Groot Sport	Truck>10,000cc
528	(Spain) Jordi Juvanteny	(Spain) Jordi Ballbe	(Spain) Fina Roman	MAN TGA 26.480	KH7 Epsilon	Truck>10,000cc
529	(Lithuania) Vaidotas Paškevicius	(Lithuania) Tomas Gužauskas	(Lithuania) Slavomir Volkov	Tatra Jamal	Fesh Fesh Team	Truck>10,000cc
530	(Netherlands) Ben Van De Laar	(Netherlands) Jan Van De Laar	(United Kingdom) Simon Stubbs	Iveco 4x4 DRNL	Fried Van De Laar Racing	Truck>10,000cc
531	(Italy) Claudio Bellina	(Italy) Bruno Gotti	(Italy) Giulio Minelli	Iveco PowerStar	Italtrans Racing	Truck>10,000cc
532	(Belgium) Dave Ingels	(Netherlands) Johannes Schotanus	(Germany) Philipp Rettig	MAN TGS 26.480	South Racing Service	Truck>10,000cc
533	(Spain) Pep Sabate	(Spain) Jordi Esteve Oro	(Spain) Arnald Bastida	MAN TGS 26.480	Bahrain Raid Xtreme	Truck>10,000cc
534	(Belgium) Igor Bouwens	(Belgium) Ulrich Boerboom	(France) Syndiely Wade	Iveco T-Way	Gregoor Racing Team	Truck>10,000cc
535	(Netherlands) William Jacobus Joha Van Groningen	(Netherlands) Wesley Van Groningen	(Netherlands) Remco Arjen Aangeenbrug	Iveco NG3/BA 03	Dust Warriors	Truck>10,000cc
537	(Netherlands) Egbert Wingens	(Netherlands) Marije Van Ettekoven	(Netherlands) Marijn Beekmans	Iveco Torpedo	DDW Rally Team	Truck>10,000cc
538	(Netherlands) Ben De Groot	(Netherlands) Ad Hofmans	(Netherlands) Govert Boogaard	DAF CF75	De Groot Sport	Truck>10,000cc
539	(Netherlands) Gerrit Zuurmond	(Netherlands) Tjeerd Van Ballegooy	(Netherlands) Klaas Kwakkel	MAN TGA	Stichting Rainbow Truck Team	Truck>10,000cc
540	(France) Sylvain Besnard	(France) Sylvain Laliche	(France) Frederic Cappucio	MAN TGA114	Team SSP	Truck>10,000cc
541	(France) Thomas Robineau	(France) Geoffrey Thalgott	(France) Francois Regnier	MAN TGA	PH-Sport	Truck>10,000cc
542	(Germany) Michael Baumann	(Germany) Philipp Beier	(Austria) Lukas Raschendorfer	MAN TGA11	Q Motorsport Team	Truck>10,000cc
543	(Belgium) Dave Berghmans	(Belgium) Tom Geuens	(France) Sam Koopmann	Iveco Trakker	Overdrive Toyota	Truck>10,000cc
544	(Hungary) Norbert Szalai	(Spain) Charly Rodriguez-O-Malley	(France) Patrice Daviton	Mercedes 4x4	Team SSP	Truck>10,000cc
545	(France) Philippe Perry	(France) Philippe Pedeche		Renault Kerax	Team Boucou	Truck>10,000cc
546	(Hungary) Zsolt Darazsi	(France) Pierre Calmon	(Slovakia) Palco Lubomir	MAN TGA	Team SSP	Truck>10,000cc
547	(Italy) Cesare Rickler Del Mare	(Romania) Dragos Razvan Buran		Iveco	R Team	Truck>10,000cc
548	(France) Richard Gonzalez	(France) Jean-Philippe Salviat	(France) Patrick Prot	DAF TSB	Sodicars Racing	Truck>10,000cc
549	(Algeria) Ahmed Benbekhti	(France) Bruno Seillet	(France) Mickael Fauvel	MAN TGS	STA Competition	Truck>10,000cc
550	(Czech Republic) Tomáš Tomeček	(Czech Republic) Leopold Padour	(Italy) Niccolo Funaioli	Tatra 815-2T0R45	South Racing Service	Truck>10,000cc
551	(France) Claude Fournier	(France) Marc Dardaillon	(Andorra) David Lamelas Morell	MAN TGA	Team Boucou	Truck>10,000cc
552	(Spain) Alberto Alonso Romero	(Spain) Oscar Bravo Garcia	(Spain) Jose Luis Santillana Ortega	MAN TGA 18480	TH-Trucks	Truck>10,000cc
553	(France) Serge Lambert	(France) Louis Lauilhe		MAN 6x6	STA Competition	Truck>10,000cc
555	(Belgium) Didier Monseu	(Belgium) Emmanuel Eggermont	(Belgium) Edouard Fraipont	MAN 4x4	AB Dream Racing	Truck>10,000cc
556	(Germany) Stefan Henken	(Germany) Michael Helminger	(Germany) Ludwig Helminger	MAN TGS	South Racing Service	Truck>10,000cc
557	(Spain) Alex Aguirregaviria	(Spain) Francesc Salisi	(Spain) Ruben Manas Pardos	Mercedes 1844 AK 4x4	FN Speed Team	Truck>10,000cc
558	(Spain) Francesc Ester Fernandez	(Spain) Javier Jacoste	(Spain) Victor Gonzalez	MAN TGA11	FN Speed Team	Truck>10,000cc
559	(France) Jean-Bernard Arette	(France) Serge Lacourt	(France) Pascal Bonnaire	DAF 75CF	Team Boucou	Truck>10,000cc
560	(Portugal) Jose Martins	(France) Didier Belivier	(France) Jeremie Gimbre	Iveco Trakker	Team Boucou	Truck>10,000cc
561	(France) Maxime Ayala	(France) Loris Blot	(France) Jean-Francois Cazeres	Scania	Team Boucou	Truck>10,000cc

Entry list — Classics

Note
– The "Dakar Legends" - competitors that participated in 10 or more Dakar events.
– The first time starters - "rookies".
– Competitors that were not able to start the race.

No.	Driver	Co-driver	Technician	Vehicle	Team	Class
700	(France) Marc Douton	(France) Jeremy Athimon	No technician	Porsche 911 Safari Type G 1985	Zip Code Würth Modyf	-87 Intermediate Average
701	(Spain) Juan Donatiú Losada	(Spain) Juan Donatiú Cuello	No technician	Mitsubishi Montero V6	Dongio Racing	100 High Average
702	(Spain) Kilian Revuelta	(Spain) Mariano De Quadros Romero De	No technician	Toyota Land Cruiser	Naturhouse	97 Low Average
703	(Italy) Roberto Camporese	(Italy) Federico Didonè	No technician	Peugeot 504 Pickup	#384Camporese	97 Low Average
705	(United States) Amy Lerner	(Belgium) Sara Carmen Bossaert	No technician	Porsche 911 SC	A.L. Rally	-87 Low Average
706	(Spain) Juan Roura Iglesias	(Spain) Miguel Angel Valencia Posada	No technician	Toyota HDJ80	Roura Lighting Team	97 Intermediate Average
707	(France) Hervé Cotel	(France) Philippe Patenotte	No technician	Buggy Cotel	Cotel	-87 Intermediate Average
708	(France) Christophe D'Indy	(France) Francois Xavier Bourgois	No technician	Peugeot 504 Coupé V6	Ralliart Off Road Classic	-87 Intermediate Average
709	(Austria) Peter Brabeck-Letmathe	(Spain) Daniel Lopez-Palao	No technician	Mitsubishi Pajero	Team Casteu Classic	100 Intermediate Average
710	(Belgium) Rene Declercq	(Belgium) John Demeester	No technician	Bombardier Iltis	VW Iltis Team	97 Low Average
711	(Italy) Ernst Amort	(Germany) Adolf Ruhaltinger	No technician	Peugeot 504 Coupé	Amort Ernst	-87 Low Average
712	(France) Stephan Lamarre	(France) Alexandre Laroche	No technician	Sunhill Buggy	CLR	-87 Low Average
713	(France) Gilles Girousse	(France) Delphine Delfino	No technician	Mercedes Koro	Aventure Girousse	-87 Intermediate Average
714	(France) Vincent Tourneur	(France) Christian Lambert	No technician	Mitsubishi Pajero T2	Ralliart Off Road Classic	97 Intermediate Average
716	(Czech Republic) Ondřej Klymčiw	(Czech Republic) Tomas Bohm	No technician	Škoda LR130	Klymčiw Racing	-87 Low Average
718	(Netherlands) Cornelis Lambert Kamp	(Netherlands) Jacobine Kamp-Noordsij	No technician	Citroën CX	CX Rally Team	-87 Low Average
719	(Italy) Maurizio Traglio	(Italy) Adriano Furlotti	No technician	Nissan Terrano 2	Tecnosport	100 Intermediate Average
720	(Belgium) Pascal Feryn	(Belgium) Koen Wauters	No technician	Toyota Land Cruiser 100	Feryn Dakar Team	100 High Average
722	(France) Olivier Guerin	(France) Thierry Delgutte	No technician	Chevrolet Silverado	Terre & Dunes Aventures	100 Intermediate Average
723	(France) Jerome Galpin	(France) Anne Galpin	No technician	FJ ProTruck	Team FJ	100 Intermediate Average
724	(France) Arnaud Delmas-Marsalet	(France) Lucas Delmas-Marsalet	No technician	Toyota HZJ78	Saharan Company	100 Intermediate Average
725	(Spain) Ignacio Corcuera	(Spain) Oscar Ordoñez Vazquez	No technician	Toyota Land Cruiser BJ40	Euskadi 4X4 Team	-87 Low Average
726	(France) Rudy Jacquot	(France) William Alcaraz	No technician	Peugeot 205 T16	Team 205 Africa Raid	-87 Intermediate Average
727	(Italy) Agostino Rizzardi	(Italy) Alberto Vassallo	No technician	Porsche 911	Motortecnica Racing Team	97 High Average
728	(France) Francois Jacquot	(France) Benoit Juif	No technician	Peugeot 404	Team 205 Africa Raid	97 High Average
729	(Spain) Manuel Capelo	(Spain) Emilio Benito Castelo	No technician	Fiat Panda Sisley	Xraids Experience	97 Low Average
730	(Slovakia) Juraj Ulrich	(Slovakia) Lubos Schwarzbacher	No technician	Mitsubishi Pajero 3000 L141G	Jantar Team S.R.O.	97 Intermediate Average
732	(Czech Republic) Martin Cabela	(Czech Republic) Olga Lounova	No technician	Mercedes G500	Orion - Moto Racing Group	-87 Intermediate Average
733	(Italy) Stefano Calzi	(Italy) Umberto Fiori	No technician	Mitsubishi Pajero MPR51	Motortecnica Racing Team	97 High Average
734	(Italy) Rebecca Busi	(Italy) Roberto Musi	No technician	Land Rover Range Rover	Busi Roberto	97 Intermediate Average
735	(Germany) Rainer Wissmanns	(France) Claire Deygas	No technician	Toyota Land Cruiser	Cummins France	97 Low Average
736	(Spain) Salvador Fernandez Barrientos	(Spain) Esther Pages Bolibar	No technician	Lada Niva	Salvador Fernandez	97 Low Average
738	(France) Yannick Commagnac	(France) Didier Lachaud	No technician	Toyota HJ61	Commagnac Lachaud	97 Intermediate Average
739	(France) Yannick Panagiotis	(France) Valérie Panagiotis	No technician	FJ ProTruck	Team FJ	100 Intermediate Average
740	(Spain) Antonio Gutierrez	(Spain) Luis Heras Rodriguez	No technician	Mercedes G-320	Rumbo Zero	-87 Low Average
741	(Spain) Enrique Mayor	(Spain) Xavier Romero Soler	No technician	Mercedes G	Rumbo Zero	97 Low Average
742	(Spain) Jesus Fuster Pliego	(Spain) Juan Carlos Ramirez Moure	No technician	Mercedes G-320	Rumbo Zero	-87 Low Average
743	(France) Audrey Sireyjol	(France) Patrick Sireyjol	No technician	Toyota Land Cruiser	Cummins France	97 Low Average
744	(Spain) Daniel Albero Puig	(Spain) Jorge Vera	No technician	Toyota Land Cruiser 90	Team Un Diabetico En El Dakar	100 Intermediate Average
745	(France) Laurent Auboueix	(France) Romain Hedin	No technician	Mercedes Koro 280GE	Aventure Girousse	-87 Intermediate Average
747	(Spain) Diego Ballester	(Spain) Enrique Conti Penina	No technician	Land Rover Range Rover	Avall Competicio	97 Low Average
748	(Spain) Javier Basagoiti	(Spain) Alfonso Masoliver	No technician	Range Rover Classic	Basamas	97 Low Average
749	(France) Jean Luc Baudet	(France) Florence Deronce	No technician	Mercedes ML Pick Up V8 W 163	Team Dakar Mercedes Racing Car	100 High Average
750	(Germany) Fritz Becker	(Romania) Ilie Constanta	No technician	Toyota Land Cruiser	Rallyeraid-Club-Germany	97 Low Average
751	(Spain) Francisco Javier Benavente	(Spain) Rafael Benavente Del Rio	No technician	Nissan Terrano	Recinsa Sport	97 Intermediate Average
752	(France) Laurent Beraud	(France) Maxime Beraud	No technician	Toyota HZJ78	Compagnie Saharienne	100 Intermediate Average
753	(France) Michel Blanc	(France) Frédéric Benedetti	No technician	Nissan Dessoude Patrol	Desert Patrol BB Team	100 Intermediate Average
754	(France) Jean-François Bottiau	(France) Eric Bottiau	No technician	Toyota Land Cruiser 100	Jean-François Bottiau	100 Intermediate Average
755	(Czech Republic) Olga Rouckova	(Czech Republic) Robert Knobloch	No technician	Suzuki Samurai	Czech Samurais	100 Intermediate Average
756	(Spain) Antonio Campos Mingorance	(Spain) Miguel Angel Muiños Sánchez	No technician	Toyota Land Cruiser 95 3.4 V6	OD22	100 Intermediate Average
757	(Portugal) Joao Antonio De Almeida E Sousa	(Portugal) Luis Manuel Da Costa Santos	No technician	SsangYong Musso	TH-Trucks	97 Intermediate Average
758	(France) Jean Yves Capo	(France) Olivier Ponchon	No technician	Toyota HDJ80	Rallye Raid Aventure Paca	97 Intermediate Average
759	(Italy) Luciano Carcheri	(Italy) Giulia Maroni	No technician	Nissan Terrano 1	Tecnosport	97 Intermediate Average
760	(Italy) Tommaso Castellazzi	(Italy) Stefano Dalla Valle	No technician	Land Rover Defender 90	T.T. Team	97 Intermediate Average
761	(Italy) Gian Paolo Tobia Cavagna	(Italy) Gianni Pelizzola	No technician	Nissan Patrol GR Y61	Team Geca	100 Intermediate Average
762	(France) Jean-Michel Gayte	(France) Maxime Vial	No technician	Mitsubishi Pajero Evo	Team JMax	100 High Average
763	(Switzerland) Mario Jacober	(Switzerland) Sladan Miljic	No technician	Lada Niva	Niva Red Legend Team	-87 Low Average
764	(France) Philippe Grandjean	(France) Kevin Grandjean	No technician	Mitsubishi Pajero	Ralliart Off Road Classic	97 High Average
765	(Belgium) Eric Claeys	(Belgium) Tom Claeys	No technician	Toyota Land Cruiser	Claeyson	97 Low Average
766	(France) Philippe Clamens	(France) Cécile Douchez	No technician	Mercedes G	Team Clamens Pere Fille	-87 Low Average
767	(Italy) Giacomo Clerici	(Italy) Oscar Polli	No technician	Nissan Terrano 1	Tecnosport	97 Intermediate Average
768	(France) Gilles Clochey	(France) Clement Dormoy	No technician	Toyota HDJ80	Passion Auto 70	97 Intermediate Average
769	(Greece) Evangelos Bersis	(Greece) Fotios Koutsoumbos	No technician	Mitsubishi Pajero	R Team	100 Intermediate Average
770	(Italy) Guido Dallarosa	(Italy) Luigi Capitani	No technician	Nissan Patrol 4.5	Motortecnica Racing Team	97 High Average
771	(France) Yannick Grezes	(France) Anthony Drapeau	No technician	Suzuki Vitara	Team PGTP 85	97 Intermediate Average
772	(Czech Republic) Frantisek Randysek	(Czech Republic) Dusan Randysek	No technician	Land Rover Series 2	Vintage Racing Team	-87 Low Average
773	(France) Tenessy Grezes	(France) Lucas Longepe	No technician	Toyota BJ73	Team PGTP 85	97 Intermediate Average
774	(Netherlands) Ben De Paauw	(Netherlands) Peter De Paauw	No technician	Mitsubishi Pajero	De Paauw Rally Team	100 Intermediate Average
775	(Belgium) Diego Delespeaux	(France) Bertrand Droupsy	No technician	Volkswagen Baja	Team Logistic Rally	-87 Intermediate Average
776	(Spain) Miquel Angel Boet	(Spain) Aleix Cabarroques Guillem	No technician	Land Rover Range Rover	Avall Competición	-87 Intermediate Average
777	(United Kingdom) Richard Worts	(United Kingdom) Nicola Shackleton	No technician	Mitsubishi Pajero V55	Historic Team Zitzewitz	100 Intermediate Average
778	(Czech Republic) Zdenek Ondracek	(Czech Republic) Rudolf Lhotsky	No technician	Toyota Land Cruiser HDJ80	Vintage Racing Team	97 Low Average
779	(Czech Republic) Albert Pance	(Czech Republic) Stepan Pance	No technician	Land Rover Series 2	Vintage Racing Team	-87 Low Average
780	(France) Patrick Doby	(France) Andre Terrier	No technician	Toyota Land Cruiser HDJ80 Collection	Les Copains	97 Intermediate Average
781	(France) Gilles Espinosa	(France) Laurent Milbergue	No technician	Land Rover Range Rover	Team Land'Oc Aventures	-87 Intermediate Average
782	(France) Thierry Emond	(France) William Lauby	No technician	Toyota Land Cruiser KDJ95	Vintage Rally Terville	100 Intermediate Average
783	(France) Arnaud Euvrard	(France) Adeline Euvrard	No technician	Mercedes ML	Team Euvrard	100 Intermediate Average
785	(France) Jean Paul Lacombe	(France) Adrien Lacombe	No technician	Mitsubishi Pajero T1B	Ralliart off Road Classic	97 Intermediate Average
786	(Spain) Antonio Garcia Coma	(Spain) Florencio Rius Planas	No technician	Toyota Land Cruiser HDJ80	TH Trucks	100 High Average
787	(Germany) Carsten Hesz	(Netherlands) Bernard Caspers	No technician	Mitsubishi Pajero Evolution	De Paauw Rally Team	100 Intermediate Average
788	(Spain) Alberto Merino	(Spain) Pilar Merino	No technician	Toyota Land Cruiser HDJ80	Merinoteam	97 Low Average
789	(France) Lionel Guy	(France) Isabelle Masse	No technician	Land Rover Range Rover	Guy	-87 Intermediate Average
790	(Spain) Julio Merino	(Spain) Esther Merino	No technician	Toyota Land Cruiser HDJ80	Merinoteam	97 Low Average
791	(France) Romain Grabowski	(France) Constance Chenard	No technician	Lada Niva	Grabowski - Chenard	-87 Low Average
792	(Spain) Julian Merino	(Spain) Sonia Merino	No technician	Toyota Land Cruiser HDJ80	Merinoteam	97 Intermediate Average
794	(Switzerland) Antonio Garzon	(Switzerland) Guillermo Baeza	No technician	Toyota Land Cruiser HDJ80	Team Marisa	97 Low Average
795	(Sweden) Elgh Lars Eje	(Sweden) Alexander Elg	No technician	Nissan Patrol	Motortecnica Racing Team	97 High Average
797	(France) Maxime Lorenzini	(France) Daniel Lorenzini	No technician	Toyota Land Cruiser HDJ80	Vintage Rally Terville	97 Intermediate Average
798	(France) Serge Mogno	(France) Florent Drulhon	No technician	Toyota Land Cruiser HDJ80	Team FSO	100 Intermediate Average
800	(Spain) Juan Morera	(Spain) Lidia Ruba	No technician	Fiat Panda 4x4	Momabikes Raids Team	97 Low Average
801	(Italy) Alberto Morganti	(Italy) Gianluca Ianni	No technician	Mitsubishi L200 Strakar	Motortecnica Racing Team	100 High Average
802	(Switzerland) Philippe Maréchal	(Switzerland) Jean-François Baud	No technician	Land Rover Range Rover	Philippe Maréchal	97 Low Average
803	(Italy) Elio Moro	(Italy) Elena Giaveri	No technician	Suzuki Vitara	Team 511	97 Low Average
805	(Spain) Miguel Merino	(Spain) Olga Merino	No technician	Toyota Land Cruiser HDJ80	Merinoteam	-87 Low Average
806	(Spain) Luis Pedrals Marot	(Spain) Gianni Melloni Ribas	No technician	Nissan Patrol	TH Trucks	97 Intermediate Average
807	(Czech Republic) Fiala Petr	(Czech Republic) Fiala Tomas	No technician	Land Rover Series 2	Vintage Racing Team	-87 Low Average
808	(Spain) Xavier Pina Garnatcha	(Spain) Sergi Giralt Valero	No technician	Toyota Land Cruiser HDJ80	Xavier Pina	97 Low Average
809	(France) Eric Pinson	(France) Laurent Hertzog	No technician	BCBG	Pinson DART Racing	-87 Low Average
810	(Spain) Rafael Priego Garcia	(Spain) Facun Vitoria Salaberria	No technician	Toyota Land Cruiser HDJ100	Autoterreno - Puravida Competition	100 Intermediate Average
811	(Spain) Carles Pujolar Rigat	(Spain) Gerard Alsina Sala	No technician	Proto Ipso Leclerc Rally (Peugeot)	Pujolaracing	100 High Average
812	(Spain) Marcel Quiros	(Spain) Artur Aragones	No technician	Lada Niva	BXS Motorsport	97 Low Average
813	(Italy) Matteo Radicioni	(Italy) Marco Arnoletti	No technician	Mitsubishi Pajero Evolution	R Team	100 Intermediate Average
814	(France) Salvatore Rapp	(France) Bruno Grilli	No technician	Toyota Land Cruiser HDJ80	Vintage Rally Terville	97 High Average
815	(France) Vincent Remblier	(France) Tom Remblier	No technician	Toyota HZJ73 Land Cruiser	Team 321 4X4	97 High Average
816	(Italy) Antonio Ricciari	(Italy) Marco Giannecchini	No technician	Mitsubishi Pajero Evolution	R Team	100 Intermediate Average
817	(Netherlands) Bart Rietbergen	(Germany) Frank Wiest	No technician	Mitsubishi Pajero	Historic Team Zitzewitz	-87 Low Average
818	(Spain) Lluis Rodriguez Boldu	(Spain) Tomaso Fenaroli Sánchez	No technician	Toyota Land Cruiser HDJ80	Silver Fox Team	97 Low Average
819	(Spain) Noemi Rodriguez Moreno	(Spain) Raul Guzman Villa	No technician	Nissan Patrol	Team Tatoracing	97 Low Average
821	(Germany) Christian Ruppert	(Germany) Ursula Ruppert	No technician	Mercedes G-280	Fun 42-Racing	-87 Low Average
822	(Germany) Jörg Sand	(Germany) Bastian Klausing	No technician	Mercedes G-280	RallyRaid-Club-Germany	-87 Intermediate Average
823	(Spain) Carlos Santaolalla Milla	(Spain) Aran Sol I Juanola	No technician	Toyota Land Cruiser KZJ95	Factory - Tub	97 Low Average
824	(Spain) Dionisio Alberto Santos Moreno	(Spain) Iñigo Ruiz Albiasu	No technician	Toyota Land Cruiser HDJ100	OD22	100 Intermediate Average
826	(Belgium) Michel Teerlinck	(Belgium) Patrick Lammens	No technician	Toyota Land Cruiser HJ70	Lammens Classics	97 Low Average
828	(Spain) Francesc Termens	(Spain) Manuel Navarro Dominguez	No technician	Nissan Patrol	TH Trucks	97 Intermediate Average
829	(Germany) Mirko Ürmosi	(Germany) Edith Nenninger	No technician	Toyota Land Cruiser HDJ80	RallyRaid-Club-Germany	97 Low Average
830	(Lithuania) Valdas Valiukevičius	(Lithuania) Paulius Kavaliauskas	No technician	Toyota Land Cruiser BJ71	Heaton Airlines	97 Low Average
831	(Netherlands) Robert Van Der Meijden	(Netherlands) Jeroen Sertons	No technician	Mitsubishi Pajero Evolution V55	De Paauw Rally Team	97 Intermediate Average
833	(Netherlands) Herman Van Oldenmark	(Netherlands) Ad Van Der Werf	No technician	Mitsubishi Pajero Evolution	Van Oldenmark Rally Team	100 High Average
834	(Belgium) Dirk Van Rompuy	(Belgium) Jean Marie Lurquin	No technician	Toyota Land Cruiser HDJ80	TH Trucks	-87 Low Average
836	(France) Henri Vergari	(France) Gautier Vergari	No technician	Toyota Land Cruiser HDJ80	Teams Cummins	97 Intermediate Average
837	(Netherlands) Alexander Wurfbain	(Netherlands) Onno Den Boer	No technician	Mercedes G-280	Wurfbain / Den Boer	-87 Low Average
838	(Spain) Jose Vidanya	(Spain) Juan Manuel Gonzalez Corominas	No technician	Toyota Land Cruiser KZJ95	Pedrega Team	97 Intermediate Average
839	(Switzerland) Cédric Zolliker	(Switzerland) Benoit Burnier	No technician	Toyota Land Cruiser HDJ80	Team Zolliker	97 Low Average
900	(Netherlands) Michiel Kuijs	(Netherlands) Geert Van Genugten	(Netherlands) Maikel Neijenhuis	DAF	Classic Team DAF	-97 Low Average
901	(Slovakia) Radovan Kazarka	(Czech Republic) Josef Kalina	(Slovakia) Robert Kasak	Tatra 815	Fesh Fesh Team	-97 Low Average
902	(France) Christophe Jacquot	(France) Julien Goumghar	(France) Eric Simonin	MAN TGE 280	Team 205 Africa Raid	e-87 Low Average
903	(France) Franck Puchouau	(France) Arnaud Ayala	(France) Laurent Correia	Renault Trucks 420DCI	FRA Laurent Correia Renault Trucks Team Boucou	-97 Low Average
904	(Netherlands) Jack Brouwers	(Netherlands) Gerard Van Veenendaal	(France) Eugene Micheal Klutman	GINAF F2222	Mammoet Rallysport	-97 Low Average
906	(Italy) Corrado Pattono	(Italy) Piermarco Acerni	No technician	Mercedes Unimog	Motortecnica Racing Team	-97 Low Average
907	(Germany) Alexander Paas	(Germany) Rudolf Krümmel	(Germany) Matthias Hertwig	MAN KAT 1 6X6	RallyRaid-Club-Germany	e-87 Low Average
908	(Spain) Vicente Rodriguez Rodriguez	(Spain) Albert Casabona	(Spain) Iván Roman Amor	Mercedes 1844 AK	TH Trucks	-97 Low Average
909	(France) Corentin Martinot	(France) Enguerran Fayolle	(France) Didier Gouttennoire	Mercedes Unimog U1550	Aventure Girousse	-97 Low Average
910	(Spain) Francesc Guillem	(Spain) Alex Rabell	No technician	Mercedes Unimog U1300L	Avall Competición	-97 Low Average
911	(Spain) Francisco Del Pozo Martinez	(Spain) Daniel Cesteros Garcia	(Spain) Gustavo Castro Rodríguez	Pegaso Pegasus 2223	Naturhouse	-97 Low Average
912	(France) Gildas Carnet	(France) Juliette Carnet	(France) Guislaine Broquet-Paget	MAN KAT	Team MAN KAT V8	e-87 Low Average
913	(Ukraine) Serhii Malyk	(Ukraine) Liubomyr Shumakov	(Ukraine) Serhi Martovenko	Renault Trucks 420DCI	STA Competicion	-100 Low Average
914	(Netherlands) Kornelis Offringa	(Netherlands) Miranda Van Middendorp	No technician	Mercedes Unimog	De Paauw Rally Team	-100 Low Average
915	(France) Alexandre Lemeray	(France) Fabien Lecaplain	(France) Guillaume Baron	MAN L90	STA Competicion	-100 Low Average
916	(Belgium) Tom De Leeuw	(Belgium) Cedric Feryn	(Belgium) Bjorn Burgelman	Mercedes 2635 AK	Feryn Dakar Team	-97 Low Average
917	(Spain) Christian Almansa	(Italy) Carlo Miniotti	(Spain) Javier Monje	Pegaso Pegasus Egyptian	Naturhouse	-97 Low Average
918	(Spain) Jordi Celma Obiols	(Spain) Jorge Toral	(Spain) Xavi Ribas	Mercedes 16-38	Pedrega Team	-97 Low Average
919	(Italy) Andrea Alfano	(Italy) Simona Morosi	(Italy) Luca Macrini	Mercedes Unimog	R Team	-97 Low Average

==== Notes ====
The Belarusian team MAZ-SPORTauto, consisting of three MAZ vehicles in T5 category were banned from taking part in the event. The organizers complied with sanctions, imposed by the EU on a number of individuals and entities in Belarus in summer 2021. The sanctions apply as MAZ-SPORTauto is a MAZ factory team, and MAZ is on the list of concerned entities. The organizers issued an official letter, stating that "the MAZ-SPORTauto team was not able to take part due to the EU regulation, which states that "no funds or economic resources may be directly or indirectly available to natural or legal persons, organizations or corporations that are on the list of persons and organizations subject to restrictive measures". The vehicles, which were en route to the port of Marseille were turned around in Poland, and the admission fees frozen for the MAZ-SPORTauto crews: 502 - Siarhei Viazovich, Pavel Haranin, Anton Zaparoshchanka; 507 - Aliaksei Vishneuski, Maksim Novikau, Siarhei Sachuk; 517 - Aliaksandr Vasileuski, Aliaksandr Shved, Vital Muryleu. MAZ-SPORTauto has been competing in Dakar Rally without interruption since 2012.

Dakar legend Erik van Loon was tested positive for COVID-19 before departing for Saudi Arabia, and was not able to compete. His place in #217 Toyota Hilux Overdrive was offered to Bernhard ten Brinke.

== Stages ==
Stage	Date		Start	Finish	Total/Special
Stage 1A	Saturday	January 1, 2022	Jeddah	Ha'il	614 km / 19 km
Stage 1B	Sunday	January 2, 2022	Ha'il	Ha'il	514 km / 333 km
Stage 2	Monday	January 3, 2022	Ha'il	Al Qaisumah	791 km / 338 km
Stage 3	Tuesday	January 4, 2022	Al Qaisumah	Al Qaisumah	636 km / 255 km
Stage 4	Wednesday	January 5, 2022	Al Qaisumah	Riyadh	707 km / 465 km
Stage 5	Thursday	January 6, 2022	Riyadh	Riyadh	560 km / 346 km
Stage 6	Friday	January 7, 2022	Riyadh	Riyadh	618 km / 402 km
Rest day	Saturday	January 8, 2022	Riyadh		—
Stage 7	Sunday	January 9, 2022	Riyadh	Al Dawadimi	701 km / 402 km
Stage 8	Monday	January 10, 2022	Al Dawadimi	Wadi Ad Dawasir	830 km / 395 km
Stage 9	Tuesday	January 11, 2022	Wadi Ad Dawasir	Wadi Ad Dawasir	491 km / 287 km
Stage 10	Wednesday	January 12, 2022	Wadi Ad Dawasir	Bisha	759 km / 375 km
Stage 11	Thursday	January 13, 2022	Bisha	Bisha	501 km / 346 km
Stage 12	Friday	January 14, 2022	Bisha	Jeddah	680 km / 164 km

Stage 2 was planned to be a marathon stage, with no-support marathon bivouac in Al Artawiyah. After heavy rain and storms, the bivouac got flooded, and subsequently was moved to Qaisumah. The marathon bivouac was cancelled, with competitors receiving normal support from their teams. Dakar Classic stage was cancelled completely, competitors moved to Qaisumah in liaison.

For stages 5 and 6, two separate route were prepared; one 421 km route and one 345 km route. For stage 5, cars, SSVs, and trucks completed the 421 km route while bikes and quads completed the 345 km route. For stage 6, the categories swapped places.

== Stage winners ==
Stage	Bikes	Quads	Cars	Light Proto (T3)	SSV (T4)	Trucks	Classics
Stage 1A	(Australia) Daniel Sanders	(Argentina) Manuel Andújar	(Qatar) Nasser Al-Attiyah	(United States) Seth Quintero	(Poland) Marek Goczał	Eduard Nikolaev	(France) Yannick Panagiotis
Stage 1B	(Australia) Daniel Sanders	(Lithuania) Laisvydas Kancius	(Qatar) Nasser Al-Attiyah	(United States) Seth Quintero	(Poland) Aron Domżała	Dmitry Sotnikov	(Spain) Xavier Piña Garnatcha
Stage 2	(Spain) Joan Barreda	(Argentina) Manuel Andújar	(France) Sébastien Loeb	(Belgium) Guillaume de Mévius	(Poland) Michał Goczał	Andrey Karginov	Stage cancelled
Stage 3	(Portugal) Joaquim Rodrigues	(United States) Pablo Copetti	(Spain) Carlos Sainz	(United States) Seth Quintero	(Poland) Marek Goczał	Dmitry Sotnikov	(Spain) Kilian Revuelta
Stage 4	(Spain) Joan Barreda	(Argentina) Manuel Andújar	(Qatar) Nasser Al-Attiyah	(United States) Seth Quintero	(Poland) Michał Goczał	Eduard Nikolaev	(Spain) Jesus Fuster Pliego
Stage 5	(Italy) Danilo Petrucci	(France) Alexandre Giroud	(South Africa) Henk Lategan	(United States) Seth Quintero	(Brazil) Rodrigo Luppi di Oliveira	Andrey Karginov	(Spain) Xavier Piña Garnatcha
Stage 6	(Australia) Daniel Sanders	Aleksandr Maksimov	(Argentina) Orlando Terranova	(United States) Seth Quintero	(Poland) Marek Goczał	Andrey Karginov	(France) Serge Mogno
Stage 7	(Chile) José Ignacio Cornejo	(Brazil) Marcelo Medeiros	(France) Sébastien Loeb	(United States) Seth Quintero	(Spain) Gerard Farrés	Anton Shibalov	(Spain) Xavier Piña Garnatcha
Stage 8	(United Kingdom) Sam Sunderland	(France) Alexandre Giroud	(Sweden) Mattias Ekström	(United States) Seth Quintero	(Poland) Marek Goczał	Dmitry Sotnikov	(Spain) Jesus Fuster Pliego
Stage 9	(Chile) José Ignacio Cornejo	(United States) Pablo Copetti	(South Africa) Giniel de Villiers	(United States) Seth Quintero	(Poland) Marek Goczał	Eduard Nikolaev	(United States) Amy Lerner
Stage 10	(Australia) Toby Price	(Brazil) Marcelo Medeiros	(France) Stéphane Peterhansel	(United States) Seth Quintero	(Lithuania) Rokas Baciuška	Dmitry Sotnikov	(Spain) Xavier Piña Garnatcha
Stage 11	(Argentina) Kevin Benavides	(Brazil) Marcelo Medeiros	(Spain) Carlos Sainz	(United States) Seth Quintero	(Poland) Marek Goczał	Eduard Nikolaev	(France) Jérôme Galpin
Stage 12	(Chile) Pablo Quintanilla	(Argentina) Francisco Moreno	(South Africa) Henk Lategan	(United States) Seth Quintero	(Lithuania) Rokas Baciuška	Dmitry Sotnikov	(Spain) Juan Roura Iglesias
Rally Winners	(United Kingdom) Sam Sunderland	(France) Alexandre Giroud	(Qatar) Nasser Al-Attiyah	(Chile) Francisco López Contardo	(United States) Austin Jones	Dmitry Sotnikov	(France) Serge Mogno

== Stage results ==
=== Bikes ===
	Stage result					General classification				
Stage	Pos	Competitor	Make	Time	Gap	Pos	Competitor	Make	Time	Gap
1A	1	(Australia) Daniel Sanders	Gas Gas	00:55:30		1	(Australia) Daniel Sanders	Gas Gas	00:55:30	
1A	2	(Chile) Pablo Quintanilla	Honda	00:56:30	00:01:00	2	(Chile) Pablo Quintanilla	Honda	00:56:30	00:01:00
1A	3	(Botswana) Ross Branch	Yamaha	00:57:25	00:01:55	3	(Botswana) Ross Branch	Yamaha	00:57:25	00:01:55
1B	1	(Australia) Daniel Sanders	Gas Gas	03:43:10		1	(Australia) Daniel Sanders	Gas Gas	04:38:40	
1B	2	(Chile) Pablo Quintanilla	Honda	03:45:17	00:02:07	2	(Chile) Pablo Quintanilla	Honda	04:41:47	00:03:07
1B	3	(Austria) Matthias Walkner	KTM	03:51:41	00:08:31	3	(Austria) Matthias Walkner	KTM	04:49:46	00:11:06
2	1	(Spain) Joan Barreda	Honda	03:31:20		1	(United Kingdom) Sam Sunderland	Gas Gas	08:31:29	
2	2	(United Kingdom) Sam Sunderland	Gas Gas	03:36:53	00:05:33	2	(France) Adrien Van Beveren	Yamaha	08:34:20	00:02:51
2	3	(Argentina) Kevin Benavides	KTM	03:37:14	00:05:54	3	(Austria) Matthias Walkner	KTM	08:35:37	00:04:08
3	1	(Portugal) Joaquim Rodrigues	Hero	02:34:41		1	(United Kingdom) Sam Sunderland	Gas Gas	11:13:40	
3	2	(Australia) Toby Price	KTM	02:35:44	00:01:03	2	(France) Adrien Van Beveren	Yamaha	11:13:44	00:00:04
3	3	(United States) Mason Klein	KTM	02:35:55	00:01:14	3	(Austria) Matthias Walkner	KTM	11:15:10	00:01:30
4	1	(Spain) Joan Barreda	Honda	04:07:76		1	(United Kingdom) Sam Sunderland	Gas Gas	15:30:01	
4	2	(Chile) Pablo Quintanilla	Honda	04:10:43	00:03:37	2	(Austria) Matthias Walkner	KTM	15:33:01	00:03:00
4	3	(Portugal) Rui Gonçalves	Sherco	04:14:05	00:06:59	3	(France) Adrien Van Beveren	Yamaha	15:34:55	00:04:54
5	1	(Italy) Danilo Petrucci	KTM	03:23:46		1	(United Kingdom) Sam Sunderland	Gas Gas	19:01:50	
5	2	(Botswana) Ross Branch	Yamaha	03:23:48	00:00:02	2	(Austria) Matthias Walkner	KTM	19:04:19	00:02:29
5	3	(Chile) José Ignacio Cornejo	Honda	03:23:51	00:00:05	3	(France) Adrien Van Beveren	Yamaha	19:07:49	00:05:59
6	1	(Australia) Daniel Sanders	Gas Gas	00:51:43		1	(United Kingdom) Sam Sunderland	Gas Gas	19:55:59	
6	2	(United Kingdom) Sam Sunderland	Gas Gas	00:54:09	00:02:26	2	(Austria) Matthias Walkner	KTM	19:58:38	00:02:39
6	3	(Austria) Matthias Walkner	KTM	00:54:19	00:02:36	3	(Australia) Daniel Sanders	Gas Gas	20:01:34	00:05:35
7	1	(Chile) José Ignacio Cornejo	Honda	03:28:46		1	(France) Adrien Van Beveren	Yamaha	23:45:02	
7	2	(Argentina) Kevin Benavides	KTM	03:29:30	00:00:44	2	(Austria) Matthias Walkner	KTM	23:50:14	00:05:12
7	3	(Spain) Joan Barreda	Honda	03:31:37	00:02:51	3	(Argentina) Kevin Benavides	KTM	23:50:25	00:05:23
8	1	(United Kingdom) Sam Sunderland	Gas Gas	03:48:02		1	(United Kingdom) Sam Sunderland	Gas Gas	27:38:42	
8	2	(Chile) Pablo Quintanilla	Honda	03:50:55	00:02:53	2	(Austria) Matthias Walkner	KTM	27:42:27	00:03:45
8	3	(Austria) Matthias Walkner	KTM	03:52:13	00:04:11	3	(France) Adrien Van Beveren	Yamaha	27:43:25	00:04:43
9	1	(Chile) José Ignacio Cornejo	Honda	02:29:30		1	(Austria) Matthias Walkner	KTM	30:14:03	
9	2	(Argentina) Kevin Benavides	KTM	02:30:56	00:01:26	2	(United Kingdom) Sam Sunderland	Gas Gas	30:16:15	00:02:12
9	3	(United States) Ricky Brabec	Honda	02:31:17	00:01:47	3	(France) Adrien Van Beveren	Yamaha	30:17:59	00:03:56
10	1	(Australia) Toby Price	KTM	03:05:32		1	(France) Adrien Van Beveren	Yamaha	33:27:06	
10	2	(Argentina) Luciano Benavides	Husqvarna	03:07:41	00:02:09	2	(Chile) Pablo Quintanilla	Honda	33:32:21	00:05:15
10	3	(France) Adrien Van Beveren	Yamaha	03:09:07	00:03:35	3	(United Kingdom) Sam Sunderland	Gas Gas	33:33:05	00:05:59
11	1	(Argentina) Kevin Benavides	KTM	03:30:56		1	(United Kingdom) Sam Sunderland	Gas Gas	37:04:05	
11	2	(United Kingdom) Sam Sunderland	Gas Gas	03:31:00	00:00:04	2	(Chile) Pablo Quintanilla	Honda	37:10:57	00:06:52
11	3	(Portugal) Joaquim Rodrigues	Hero	03:33:22	00:02:26	3	(Austria) Matthias Walkner	KTM	37:11:20	00:07:15
12	1	(Chile) Pablo Quintanilla	Honda	01:40:00		1	(United Kingdom) Sam Sunderland	Gas Gas	38:47:30	
12	2	(Australia) Toby Price	KTM	01:40:18	00:00:18	2	(Chile) Pablo Quintanilla	Honda	38:50:57	00:03:27
12	3	(Chile) José Ignacio Cornejo	Honda	01:40:29	00:00:29	3	(Austria) Matthias Walkner	KTM	38:54:17	00:06:47

=== Quads ===
	Stage result					General classification				
Stage	Pos	Competitor	Make	Time	Gap	Pos	Competitor	Make	Time	Gap
1A	1	(Argentina) Manuel Andújar	Yamaha	01:10:10		1	(Argentina) Manuel Andújar	Yamaha	01:10:10	
1A	2	(France) Alexandre Giroud	Yamaha	01:11:45	00:01:35	2	(France) Alexandre Giroud	Yamaha	01:11:45	00:01:35
1A	3	(Chile) Giovanni Enrico	Yamaha	01:12:45	00:02:35	3	(Chile) Giovanni Enrico	Yamaha	01:12:45	00:02:35
1B	1	(Lithuania) Laisvydas Kancius	Yamaha	04:57:02		1	(Lithuania) Laisvydas Kancius	Yamaha	06:15:37	
1B	2	(United States) Pablo Copetti	Yamaha	05:07:13	00:10:11	2	(Chile) Giovanni Enrico	Yamaha	06:21:47	00:06:10
1B	3	(Chile) Giovanni Enrico	Yamaha	05:09:02	00:12:00	3	(United States) Pablo Copetti	Yamaha	06:25:13	00:09:36
2	1	(Argentina) Manuel Andújar	Yamaha	04:27:51		1	(Lithuania) Laisvydas Kancius	Yamaha	10:54:36	
2	2	(France) Alexandre Giroud	Yamaha	04:29:54	00:02:03	2	(United States) Pablo Copetti	Yamaha	10:58:08	00:03:32
2	3	(United States) Pablo Copetti	Yamaha	04:32:55	00:05:04	3	(France) Alexandre Giroud	Yamaha	11:11:33	00:16:57
3	1	(United States) Pablo Copetti	Yamaha	03:12:48		1	(United States) Pablo Copetti	Yamaha	14:10:56	
3	2	(France) Alexandre Giroud	Yamaha	03:14:52	00:02:04	2	(France) Alexandre Giroud	Yamaha	14:26:25	00:15:29
3	3	(Argentina) Manuel Andújar	Yamaha	03:17:02	00:04:14	3	Aleksandr Maksimov	Yamaha	14:40:08	00:29:12
4	1	(Argentina) Manuel Andújar	Yamaha	05:12:20		1	(United States) Pablo Copetti	Yamaha	19:26:41	
4	2	(France) Alexandre Giroud	Yamaha	05:13:36	00:01:16	2	(France) Alexandre Giroud	Yamaha	19:40:01	00:13:20
4	3	Aleksandr Maksimov	Yamaha	05:14:28	00:02:08	3	Aleksandr Maksimov	Yamaha	19:54:36	00:27:55
5	1	(France) Alexandre Giroud	Yamaha	04:28:09		1	(France) Alexandre Giroud	Yamaha	24:08:10	
5	2	(Poland) Kamil Wiśniewski	Yamaha	04:40:50	00:12:41	2	(United States) Pablo Copetti	Yamaha	24:12:03	00:03:53
5	3	(United States) Pablo Copetti	Yamaha	04:45:22	00:17:13	3	(Argentina) Manuel Andújar	Yamaha	24:41:23	00:33:13
6	1	Aleksandr Maksimov	Yamaha	01:10:10		1	(France) Alexandre Giroud	Yamaha	25:18:29	
6	2	(France) Alexandre Giroud	Yamaha	01:10:19	00:00:09	2	(United States) Pablo Copetti	Yamaha	25:23:21	00:04:52
6	3	(France) Sébastien Souday	Yamaha	01:10:49	00:00:39	3	Aleksandr Maksimov	Yahama	25:54:44	00:36:15
7	1	(Brazil) Marcelo Medeiros	Yamaha	04:17:18		1	(France) Alexandre Giroud	Yamaha	29:38:54	
7	2	(France) Alexandre Giroud	Yamaha	04:20:25	00:03:07	2	(United States) Pablo Copetti	Yamaha	29:57:15	00:18:21
7	3	(United States) Pablo Copetti	Yamaha	04:33:54	00:16:36	3	Aleksandr Maksimov	Yamaha	30:49:33	01:10:39
8	1	(France) Alexandre Giroud	Yamaha	05:02:08		1	(France) Alexandre Giroud	Yamaha	34:41:02	
8	2	(Brazil) Marcelo Medeiros	Yamaha	05:02:56	00:00:48	2	(United States) Pablo Copetti	Yamaha	35:11:49	00:30:47
8	3	(United States) Pablo Copetti	Yamaha	05:14:34	00:12:26	3	(Poland) Kamil Wiśniewski	Yamaha	36:53:13	02:12:11
9	1	(United States) Pablo Copetti	Yamaha	03:18:58		1	(France) Alexandre Giroud	Yamaha	38:06:16	
9	2	(France) Alexandre Giroud	Yamaha	03:25:14	00:06:16	2	(United States) Pablo Copetti	Yamaha	38:30:47	00:24:31
9	3	(Argentina) Francisco Moreno	Yamaha	03:28:03	00:09:05	3	(Poland) Kamil Wiśniewski	Yamaha	40:44:18	02:38:02
10	1	(Brazil) Marcelo Medeiros	Yamaha	04:11:04		1	(France) Alexandre Giroud	Yamaha	42:21:01	
10	2	(France) Alexandre Giroud	Yamaha	04:17:48	00:06:44	2	(Argentina) Francisco Moreno	Yamaha	45:04:32	02:43:31
10	3	(Argentina) Francisco Moreno	Yamaha	04:19:34	00:08:30	3	(Poland) Kamil Wiśniewski	Yamaha	45:12:47	02:51:46
11	1	(Brazil) Marcelo Medeiros	Yamaha	04:53:29		1	(France) Alexandre Giroud	Yamaha	47:26:25	
11	2	(Poland) Kamil Wiśniewski	Yamaha	04:58:33	00:05:04	2	(Argentina) Francisco Moreno	Yamaha	50:07:49	02:41:24
11	3	(Argentina) Francisco Moreno	Yamaha	05:03:17	00:09:48	3	(Poland) Kamil Wiśniewski	Yamaha	50:11:20	02:44:55
12	1	(Argentina) Francisco Moreno	Yamaha	02:14:13		1	(France) Alexandre Giroud	Yamaha	50:00:51	
12	2	(Poland) Kamil Wiśniewski	Yamaha	02:16:56	00:02:43	2	(Argentina) Francisco Moreno	Yamaha	52:22:02	02:21:11
12	3	(Brazil) Marcelo Medeiros	Yamaha	02:21:55	00:07:42	3	(Poland) Kamil Wiśniewski	Yamaha	52:28:16	02:27:25

=== Cars ===
	Stage result					General classification				
Stage	Pos	Competitor	Make	Time	Gap	Pos	Competitor	Make	Time	Gap
1A	1	(Qatar) Nasser Al-Attiyah	Toyota	00:10:56		1	(Qatar) Nasser Al-Attiyah	Toyota	00:10:56	
1A	2	(Spain) Carlos Sainz	Audi	00:11:08	00:00:12	2	(Spain) Carlos Sainz	Audi	00:11:08	00:00:12
1A	3	(South Africa) Brian Baragwanath	Century	00:11:32	00:00:36	3	(South Africa) Brian Baragwanath	Century	00:11:32	00:00:36
1B	1	(Qatar) Nasser Al-Attiyah	Toyota	03:19:57		1	(Qatar) Nasser Al-Attiyah	Toyota	03:30:53	
1B	2	(France) Sébastien Loeb	BRX	03:22:04	00:12:07	2	(France) Sébastien Loeb	BRX	03:43:37	00:12:44
1B	3	(Czech Republic) Martin Prokop	Ford	03:40:18	00:21:21	3	(Czech Republic) Martin Prokop	Ford	03:53:32	00:22:39
2	1	(France) Sébastien Loeb	BRX	03:25:00		1	(Qatar) Nasser Al-Attiyah	Toyota	06:59:21	
2	2	(Qatar) Nasser Al-Attiyah	Toyota	03:28:28	00:03:28	2	(France) Sébastien Loeb	BRX	07:08:37	00:09:16
2	3	(Spain) Carlos Sainz	Audi	03:30:52	00:05:52	3	(Argentina) Lucio Álvarez	Toyota	07:40:14	00:40:53
3	1	(Spain) Carlos Sainz	Audi	02:26:51		1	(Qatar) Nasser Al-Attiyah	Toyota	09:31:22	
3	2	(South Africa) Henk Lategan	Toyota	02:27:29	00:00:38	2	(France) Sébastien Loeb	BRX	10:09:02	00:37:40
3	3	(France) Stéphane Peterhansel	Audi	02:28:32	00:01:41	3	(Argentina) Lucio Álvarez	Toyota	10:13:28	00:42:06
4	1	(Qatar) Nasser Al-Attiyah	Toyota	03:54:40		1	(Qatar) Nasser Al-Attiyah	Toyota	13:26:02	
4	2	(France) Sébastien Loeb	BRX	03:55:05	00:00:25	2	(France) Sébastien Loeb	BRX	14:04:07	00:38:05
4	3	(Spain) Carlos Sainz	Audi	03:55:32	00:00:52	3	(Saudi Arabia) Yazeed Al-Rajhi	Toyota	14:15:17	00:49:15
5	1	(South Africa) Henk Lategan	Toyota	03:53:28		1	(Qatar) Nasser Al-Attiyah	Toyota	17:24:23	
5	2	(France) Sébastien Loeb	BRX	03:55:26	00:01:58	2	(France) Sébastien Loeb	BRX	17:59:33	00:35:10
5	3	(Argentina) Lucio Álvarez	Toyota	03:55:38	00:02:10	3	(Argentina) Lucio Álvarez	Toyota	18:15:38	00:51:15
6	1	(Argentina) Orlando Terranova	BRX	03:06:45		1	(Qatar) Nasser Al-Attiyah	Toyota	20:37:24	
6	2	(Sweden) Mattias Ekström	Audi	03:07:51	00:01:06	2	(Saudi Arabia) Yazeed Al-Rajhi	Toyota	21:26:18	00:48:54
6	3	(Saudi Arabia) Yazeed Al-Rajhi	Toyota	03:08:34	00:01:49	3	(France) Sébastien Loeb	BRX	21:27:49	00:50:25
7	1	(France) Sébastien Loeb	BRX	03:09:32		1	(Qatar) Nasser Al-Attiyah	Toyota	23:52:22	
7	2	(Qatar) Nasser Al-Attiyah	Toyota	03:14:58	00:05:26	2	(France) Sébastien Loeb	BRX	24:37:21	00:44:59
7	3	(Spain) Carlos Sainz	Audi	03:17:15	00:07:43	3	(Saudi Arabia) Yazeed Al-Rajhi	Toyota	24:45:53	00:53:31
8	1	(Sweden) Mattias Ekström	Audi	03:43:21		1	(Qatar) Nasser Al-Attiyah	Toyota	27:45:52	
8	2	(France) Stéphane Peterhansel	Audi	03:44:10	00:00:49	2	(France) Sébastien Loeb	BRX	28:23:50	00:37:58
8	3	(France) Sébastien Loeb	BRX	03:46:29	00:03:08	3	(Saudi Arabia) Yazeed Al-Rajhi	Toyota	28:39:05	00:53:13
9	1	(South Africa) Giniel De Villiers	Toyota	02:23:08		1	(Qatar) Nasser Al-Attiyah	Toyota	30:10:04	
9	2	(South Africa) Henk Lategan	Toyota	02:23:17	00:00:09	2	(France) Sébastien Loeb	BRX	30:49:09	00:39:05
9	3	(Qatar) Nasser Al-Attiyah	Toyota	02:24:12	00:01:04	3	(Saudi Arabia) Yazeed Al-Rajhi	Toyota	31:08:48	00:58:44
10	1	(France) Stéphane Peterhansel	Audi	02:52:43		1	(Qatar) Nasser Al-Attiyah	Toyota	33:13:37	
10	2	(Spain) Carlos Sainz	Audi	02:54:49	00:02:06	2	(France) Sébastien Loeb	BRX	33:46:17	00:32:40
10	3	(Argentina) Orlando Terranova	BRX	02:56:42	00:03:59	3	(Saudi Arabia) Yazeed Al-Rajhi	Toyota	34:09:25	00:54:48
11	1	(Spain) Carlos Sainz	Audi	03:29:32		1	(Qatar) Nasser Al-Attiyah	Toyota	36:49:51	
11	2	(Argentina) Lucio Álvarez	Toyota	03:32:42	00:03:10	2	(France) Sébastien Loeb	BRX	37:23:10	00:33:19
11	3	(Sweden) Mattias Ekström	Audi	03:33:25	00:03:53	3	(Saudi Arabia) Yazeed Al-Rajhi	Toyota	37:53:34	01:03:43
12	1	(South Africa) Henk Lategan	Toyota	01:35:19		1	(Qatar) Nasser Al-Attiyah	Toyota	38:33:03	
12	2	(France) Stéphane Peterhansel	Audi	01:36:08	00:00:49	2	(France) Sébastien Loeb	BRX	39:00:49	00:27:46
12	3	(South Africa) Brian Baragwanath	Century	01:37:10	00:01:51	3	(Saudi Arabia) Yazeed Al-Rajhi	Toyota	39:34:16	01:01:13

=== Light Prototypes ===
	Stage result					General classification				
Stage	Pos	Competitor	Make	Time	Gap	Pos	Competitor	Make	Time	Gap
1A	1	(United States) Seth Quintero	OT3	00:13:07		1	(United States) Seth Quintero	OT3	00:13:07	
1A	2	(Norway) Andreas Mikkelsen	OT3	00:13:10	00:00:03	2	(Norway) Andreas Mikkelsen	OT3	00:13:10	00:00:03
1A	3	(Chile) Francisco López Contardo	Can-Am	00:13:12	00:00:05	3	(Chile) Francisco López Contardo	Can-Am	00:13:12	00:00:05
1B	1	(United States) Seth Quintero	OT3	4:08:28		1	(United States) Seth Quintero	OT3	04:21:35	
1B	2	(Chile) Francisco López Contardo	Can-Am	4:10:21	00:01:53	2	(Chile) Francisco López Contardo	Can-Am	04:23:33	00:01:58
1B	3	(Sweden) Sebastian Eriksson	Can-Am	4:14:39	00:06:11	3	(Sweden) Sebastian Eriksson	Can-Am	04:28:27	00:06:52
2	1	(Belgium) Guillaume De Mévius	OT3	04:02:24		1	(Chile) Francisco López Contardo	Can-Am	08:30:15	
2	2	(Chile) Francisco López Contardo	Can-Am	04:06:42	00:04:18	2	(Sweden) Sebastian Eriksson	Can-Am	08:37:37	00:07:22
2	3	(Sweden) Sebastian Eriksson	Can-Am	04:09:10	00:06:46	3	Pavel Lebedev	Can-Am	08:54:03	00:23:48
3	1	(United States) Seth Quintero	OT3	02:53:23		1	(Chile) Francisco López Contardo	Can-Am	11:27:54	
3	2	(Chile) Francisco López Contardo	Can-Am	02:57:39	00:05:16	2	(Sweden) Sebastian Eriksson	Can-Am	11:37:03	00:09:09
3	3	(Sweden) Sebastian Eriksson	Can-Am	02:59:26	00:07:03	3	Pavel Lebedev	Can-Am	11:54:09	00:27:05
4	1	(United States) Seth Quintero	OT3	04:25:13		1	(Chile) Francisco López Contardo	Can-Am	16:08:33	
4	2	(Belgium) Guillaume De Mévius	OT3	04:33:03	00:07:50	2	(Sweden) Sebastian Eriksson	Can-Am	16:29:32	00:20:59
4	3	(Chile) Francisco López Contardo	Can-Am	04:40:39	00:15:26	3	(France) Philippe Pinchedez	Can-Am	17:54:42	01:46:09
5	1	(United States) Seth Quintero	OT3	04:21:10		1	(Chile) Francisco López Contardo	Can-Am	20:38:29	
5	2	(Chile) Francisco López Contardo	Can-Am	04:29:56	00:08:46	2	(Sweden) Sebastian Eriksson	Can-Am	21:00:45	00:22:16
5	3	(Sweden) Sebastian Eriksson	Can-Am	04:31:13	00:10:03	3	(France) Philippe Pinchedez	Can-Am	22:44:07	02:05:38
6	1	(United States) Seth Quintero	OT3	03:27:23		1	(Chile) Francisco López Contardo	Can-Am	24:19:17	
6	2	(Spain) Cristina Gutiérrez	OT3	03:38:44	00:11:21	2	(Sweden) Sebastian Eriksson	Can-Am	24:42:26	00:23:09
6	3	(Chile) Francisco López Contardo	Can-Am	03:40:48	00:13:25	3	(Spain) Cristina Gutiérrez	OT3	26:39:33	02:20:16
7	1	(United States) Seth Quintero	OT3	03:45:20		1	(Chile) Francisco López Contardo	Can-Am	28:17:24	
7	2	(Spain) Cristina Gutiérrez	OT3	03:52:31	00:07:11	2	(Sweden) Sebastian Eriksson	Can-Am	29:41:29	01:24:05
7	3	Pavel Lebedev	Can-Am	03:57:11	00:11:51	3	(Spain) Cristina Gutiérrez	OT3	30:32:04	02:14:40
8	1	(United States) Seth Quintero	OT3	04:17:14		1	(Chile) Francisco López Contardo	Can-Am	32:51:39	
8	2	(Sweden) Sebastian Eriksson	Can-Am	04:29:11	00:11:57	2	(Sweden) Sebastian Eriksson	Can-Am	34:10:40	01:19:01
8	3	Pavel Lebedev	Can-Am	04:29:46	00:12:32	3	(Spain) Fernando Álvarez	Can-Am	35:47:09	02:55:30
9	1	(United States) Seth Quintero	OT3	02:50:04		1	(Chile) Francisco López Contardo	Can-Am	35:47:12	
9	2	(Spain) Cristina Gutiérrez	OT3	02:52:24	00:02:20	2	(Sweden) Sebastian Eriksson	Can-Am	37:07:03	01:19:51
9	3	(Chile) Francisco López Contardo	Can-Am	02:55:33	00:05:29	3	(Spain) Fernando Álvarez	Can-Am	38:53:33	03:06:21
10	1	(United States) Seth Quintero	OT3	03:22:11		1	(Chile) Francisco López Contardo	Can-Am	39:43:03	
10	2	(Spain) Cristina Gutiérrez	OT3	03:24:33	00:02:22	2	(Sweden) Sebastian Eriksson	Can-Am	40:38:59	00:55.56
10	3	(Sweden) Sebastian Eriksson	Can-Am	03:31:56	00:09:45	3	(Spain) Fernando Álvarez	Can-Am	42:39:31	02:56:28
11	1	(United States) Seth Quintero	OT3	03:57:53		1	(Chile) Francisco López Contardo	Can-Am	44:11:34	
11	2	(Sweden) Sebastian Eriksson	Can-Am	04:13:11	00:15:18	2	(Sweden) Sebastian Eriksson	Can-Am	44:52:10	00:40.36
11	3	Pavel Lebedev	Can-Am	04:16:00	00:18:07	3	(Spain) Cristina Gutiérrez	OT3	48:27:56	04:16:22
12	1	(United States) Seth Quintero	OT3	01:48:46		1	(Chile) Francisco López Contardo	Can-Am	45:50:51	
12	2	(Sweden) Sebastian Eriksson	Can-Am	01:50:09	00:01:23	2	(Sweden) Sebastian Eriksson	Can-Am	46:42:19	00:51:28
12	3	(Chile) Francisco López Contardo	Can-Am	01:54:17	00:05:31	3	(Spain) Cristina Gutiérrez	OT3	50:25:34	04:34:43

=== SSVs ===
	Stage result					General classification				
Stage	Pos	Competitor	Make	Time	Gap	Pos	Competitor	Make	Time	Gap
1A	1	(Poland) Marek Goczał	Can-Am	00:13:22		1	(Poland) Marek Goczał	Can-Am	00:13:22	
1A	2	(Poland) Michał Goczał	Can-Am	00:13:36	00:00:14	2	(Poland) Michał Goczał	Can-Am	00:13:36	00:00:14
1A	3	(Brazil) Rodrigo Luppi De Oliveira	Can-Am	00:13:40	00:00:18	3	(Brazil) Rodrigo Luppi De Oliveira	Can-Am	00:13:40	00:00:18
1B	1	(Poland) Aron Domżała	Can-Am	04:23:19		1	(Poland) Aron Domżała	Can-Am	04:37:26	
1B	2	(United States) Austin Jones	Can-Am	04:25:26	00:02:07	2	(United States) Austin Jones	Can-Am	04:39:24	00:01:58
1B	3	(Brazil) Rodrigo Luppi De Oliveira	Can-Am	04:27:48	00:04:29	3	(Brazil) Rodrigo Luppi De Oliveira	Can-Am	04:41:28	00:04:02
2	1	(Poland) Michał Goczał	Can-Am	04:10:34		1	(United States) Austin Jones	Can-Am	08:51:19	
2	2	(United States) Austin Jones	Can-Am	04:11:55	00:01:21	2	(Brazil) Rodrigo Luppi De Oliveira	Can-Am	08:53:47	00:02:28
2	3	(Brazil) Rodrigo Luppi De Oliveira	Can-Am	04:12:19	00:01:45	3	(Spain) Gerard Farrés	Can-Am	08:58:40	00:07:21
3	1	(Poland) Marek Goczał	Can-Am	02:58:46		1	(United States) Austin Jones	Can-Am	11:53:53	
3	2	(Poland) Michał Goczał	Can-Am	03:01:36	00:02:50	2	(Brazil) Rodrigo Luppi De Oliveira	Can-Am	11:59:16	00:05:23
3	3	(Poland) Aron Domżała	Can-Am	03:01:54	00:03:48	3	(Spain) Gerard Farrés	Can-Am	12:07:57	00:14:04
4	1	(Poland) Michał Goczał	Can-Am	04:44:54		1	(United States) Austin Jones	Can-Am	16:44:08	
4	2	(Brazil) Rodrigo Luppi De Oliveira	Can-Am	04:49:05	00:04:11	2	(Brazil) Rodrigo Luppi De Oliveira	Can-Am	16:48:21	00:04:13
4	3	(United States) Austin Jones	Can-Am	04:50:15	00:05:21	3	(Poland) Michał Goczał	Can-Am	16:54:41	00:10:33
5	1	(Brazil) Rodrigo Luppi De Oliveira	Can-Am	04:33:12		1	(Brazil) Rodrigo Luppi De Oliveira	Can-Am	21:21:33	
5	2	(Poland) Marek Goczał	Can-Am	04:35:45	00:02:33	2	(United States) Austin Jones	Can-Am	21:26:00	00:04:27
5	3	Sergei Kariakin	BRP Can-Am	04:37:22	00:04:10	3	(Spain) Gerard Farrés	Can-Am	21:45:01	00:23:28
6	1	(Poland) Marek Goczał	Can-Am	03:39:24		1	(Brazil) Rodrigo Luppi De Olivera	Can-Am	25:04:01	
6	2	(Brazil) Rodrigo Luppi De Olivera	Can-Am	03:42:28	00:03:04	2	(United States) Austin Jones	Can-Am	25:10:57	00:06:56
6	3	Sergei Kariakin	BRP Can-Am	03:42:30	00:03:06	3	(Poland) Michał Goczał	Can-Am	25:32:07	00:28:06
7	1	(Spain) Gerard Farrés	Can-Am	04:01:38		1	(United States) Austin Jones	Can-Am	29:28:14	
7	2	(Poland) Aron Domżała	Can-Am	04:02:56	00:01:18	2	(Spain) Gerard Farrés	Can-Am	29:34:47	00:06:33
7	3	(Poland) Marek Goczał	Can-Am	04:04:35	00:02:57	3	(Poland) Michał Goczał	Can-Am	29:48:25	00:20:11
8	1	(Poland) Marek Goczał	Can-Am	04:36:14		1	(United States) Austin Jones	Can-Am	34:12:38	
8	2	(Poland) Michał Goczał	Can-Am	04:39:02	00:02:48	2	(Spain) Gerard Farrés	Can-Am	34:19:16	00:06:38
8	3	(United States) Austin Jones	Can-Am	04:44:24	00:08:10	3	(Poland) Michał Goczał	Can-Am	34:27:27	00:14:49
9	1	(Poland) Marek Goczał	Can-Am	03:00:52		1	(United States) Austin Jones	Can-Am	37:14:28	
9	2	(United States) Austin Jones	Can-Am	03:01:50	00:00:58	2	(Spain) Gerard Farrés	Can-Am	37:28:15	00:13:47
9	3	(Poland) Michał Goczał	Can-Am	03:03:28	00:02:36	3	(Poland) Michał Goczał	Can-Am	37:30:55	00:16:27
10	1	(Lithuania) Rokas Baciuška	Can-Am	03:36:55		1	(United States) Austin Jones	Can-Am	40:55:24	
10	2	(Poland) Aron Domżała	Can-Am	03:38:53	00:01:58	2	(Spain) Gerard Farrés	Can-Am	41:07:18	00:11:54
10	3	(Spain) Gerard Farrés	Can-Am	03:39:03	00:02:08	3	(Poland) Michał Goczał	Can-Am	41:11:02	00:15:38
11	1	(Poland) Marek Goczał	Can-Am	04:13:12		1	(Spain) Gerard Farrés	Can-Am	45:24:07	
11	2	(Spain) Gerard Farrés	Can-Am	04:16:49	00:03:37	2	(United States) Austin Jones	Can-Am	45:25:48	00:01:41
11	3	(Lithuania) Rokas Baciuška	Can-Am	04:19:20	00:06:08	3	(Poland) Marek Goczał	Can-Am	45:42:06	00:17:59
12	1	(Lithuania) Rokas Baciuška	Can-Am	01:51:15		1	(United States) Austin Jones	Can-Am	47:22:50	
12	2	(Brazil) Rodrigo Luppi De Olivera	Can-Am	01:54:38	00:03:23	2	(Spain) Gerard Farrés	Can-Am	47:25:27	00:02:37
12	3	(United States) Austin Jones	Can-Am	01:57:02	00:05:47	3	(Lithuania) Rokas Baciuška	Can-Am	47:38:08	00:15:18

=== Trucks ===
	Stage result					General classification				
Stage	Pos	Competitor	Make	Time	Gap	Pos	Competitor	Make	Time	Gap
1A	1	Eduard Nikolaev	Kamaz	00:13:01		1	Eduard Nikolaev	Kamaz	00:13:01	
1A	2	Dmitry Sotnikov	Kamaz	00:13:08	00:00:07	2	Dmitry Sotnikov	Kamaz	00:13:08	00:00:07
1A	3	Andrey Karginov	Kamaz	00:13:16	00:00:15	3	Andrey Karginov	Kamaz	00:13:16	00:00:15
1B	1	Dmitry Sotnikov	Kamaz	03:53:14		1	Dmitry Sotnikov	Kamaz	04:06:22	
1B	2	Eduard Nikolaev	Kamaz	03:53:52	00:00:38	2	Eduard Nikolaev	Kamaz	04:06:53	00:00:31
1B	3	Anton Shibalov	Kamaz	04:11:53	00:18:39	3	Anton Shibalov	Kamaz	04:25:18	00:18:56
2	1	Andrey Karginov	Kamaz	03:52:07		1	Dmitry Sotnikov	Kamaz	07:59:07	
2	2	Dmitry Sotnikov	Kamaz	03:52:45	00:00:38	2	Eduard Nikolaev	Kamaz	08:01:14	00:02:07
2	3	Eduard Nikolaev	Kamaz	03:54:21	00:02:14	3	Andrey Karginov	Kamaz	08:17:41	00:18:34
3	1	Dmitry Sotnikov	Kamaz	02:43:25		1	Dmitry Sotnikov	Kamaz	10:42:32	
3	2	Andrey Karginov	Kamaz	02:44:35	00:01:10	2	Eduard Nikolaev	Kamaz	10:54:17	00:11:45
3	3	(Netherlands) Janus van Kasteren	Iveco	02:46:33	00:03:08	3	Andrey Karginov	Kamaz	11:02:16	00:19:44
4	1	Eduard Nikolaev	Kamaz	04:16:46		1	Dmitry Sotnikov	Kamaz	15:03:53	
4	2	Anton Shibalov	Kamaz	04:18:21	00:01:35	2	Eduard Nikolaev	Kamaz	15:11:03	00:07:10
4	3	(Netherlands) Janus van Kasteren	Iveco	04:20:30	00:03:44	3	Anton Shibalov	Kamaz	15:27:58	00:24:05
5	1	Andrey Karginov	Kamaz	04:03:02		1	Dmitry Sotnikov	Kamaz	19:09:20	
5	2	Dmitry Sotnikov	Kamaz	04:05:27	00:02:25	2	Eduard Nikolaev	Kamaz	19:19:13	00:09:53
5	3	Eduard Nikolaev	Kamaz	04:08:10	00:05:08	3	Anton Shibalov	Kamaz	19:36:47	00:27:27
6	1	Andrey Karginov	Kamaz	03:16:16		1	Dmitry Sotnikov	Kamaz	22:25:45	
6	2	Dmitry Sotnikov	Kamaz	03:16:25	00:00:09	2	Eduard Nikolaev	Kamaz	22:36:14	00:10:29
6	3	Eduard Nikolaev	Kamaz	03:17:01	00:00:45	3	Anton Shibalov	Kamaz	23:04:02	00:38:17
7	1	Anton Shibalov	Kamaz	03:33:17		1	Dmitry Sotnikov	Kamaz	26:05:54	
7	2	Eduard Nikolaev	Kamaz	03:34:54	00:01:37	2	Eduard Nikolaev	Kamaz	26:11:08	00:05:14
7	3	(Netherlands) Martin van den Brink	Iveco	03:37:42	00:04:25	3	Anton Shibalov	Kamaz	26:37:19	00:31:25
8	1	Dmitry Sotnikov	Kamaz	03:56:42		1	Dmitry Sotnikov	Kamaz	30:02:36	
8	2	Andrey Karginov	Kamaz	03:59:53	00:03:11	2	Eduard Nikolaev	Kamaz	30:14:01	00:11:25
8	3	Eduard Nikolaev	Kamaz	04:02:53	00:06:11	3	Anton Shibalov	Kamaz	30:42:59	00:40:23
9	1	Eduard Nikolaev	Kamaz	02:38:43		1	Dmitry Sotnikov	Kamaz	32:43:53	
9	2	Dmitry Sotnikov	Kamaz	02:41:17	00:02:34	2	Eduard Nikolaev	Kamaz	32:52:44	00:08:51
9	3	(Czech Republic) Martin Macík	Iveco	02:41:20	00:02:37	3	Anton Shibalov	Kamaz	33:25:11	00:41:18
10	1	Dmitry Sotnikov	Kamaz	03:14:15		1	Dmitry Sotnikov	Kamaz	35:58:08	
10	2	Eduard Nikolaev	Kamaz	03:15:42	00:01:27	2	Eduard Nikolaev	Kamaz	36:08:26	00:10:18
10	3	Andrey Karginov	Kamaz	03:16:04	00:01:49	3	Anton Shibalov	Kamaz	36:42:35	00:44:27
11	1	Eduard Nikolaev	Kamaz	03:54:45		1	Dmitry Sotnikov	Kamaz	39:54:53	
11	2	Andrey Karginov	Kamaz	03:55:00	00:00:15	2	Eduard Nikolaev	Kamaz	40:03:11	00:08:18
11	3	Dmitry Sotnikov	Kamaz	03:56:45	00:02:00	3	Anton Shibalov	Kamaz	40:59:43	01:04:50
12	1	Dmitry Sotnikov	Kamaz	01:42:41		1	Dmitry Sotnikov	Kamaz	41:37:34	
12	2	(Czech Republic) Martin Macík	Iveco	01:43:13	00:00:32	2	Eduard Nikolaev	Kamaz	41:47:32	00:09:58
12	3	(Chile) Ignacio Casale	Tatra	01:43:42	00:01:01	3	Anton Shibalov	Kamaz	42:48:45	01:11:11

=== Classics ===
	Stage result					General classification				
Stage	Pos	Competitor	Make	Points	Gap	Pos	Competitor	Make	Points	Gap
1A	1	(France) Yannick Panagiotis	Protruck	10		1	(France) Yannick Panagiotis	Protruck	10	
1A	2	(France) Jean-Michel Gayte	Mitsubishi	13	+3	2	(France) Jean-Michel Gayte	Mitsubishi	13	+3
1A	3	(Spain) Antonio Gutierrez	Mercedes-Benz	16	+6	3	(Spain) Antonio Gutierrez	Mercedes-Benz	16	+6
1B	1	(Spain) Xavier Piña Garnatcha	Toyota	19		1	(Spain) Xavier Piña Garnatcha	Toyota	19	
1B	2	(France) Yannick Panagiotis	Protruck	19	0	2	(France) Yannick Panagiotis	Protruck	19	0
1B	3	(France) Stéphane Lamarre	Sunhill	25	+6	3	(France) Stéphane Lamarre	Sunhill	25	+6
2	Stage cancelled due to flooding									
3	1	(Spain) Kilian Revuelta	Toyota	14		1	(France) Jean-Michel Gayte	Mitsubishi	57	
3	2	(United States) Amy Lerner	Porsche	16	+2	2	(Spain) Kilian Revuelta	Toyota	63	+6
3	3	(France) Serge Mogno	Toyota	21	+7	3	(France) Serge Mogno	Toyota	71	+14
4	1	(Spain) Jesus Fuster Pliego	Mercedes-Benz	12		1	(Spain) Jesus Fuster Pliego	Mercedes-Benz	85	
4	2	(France) Serge Mogno	Toyota	21	+9	2	(France) Serge Mogno	Toyota	92	+7
4	3	(Spain) Enrique Mayor	Mercedes-Benz	23	+11	3	(France) Arnaud Euvrard	Mercedes-Benz	163	+78
5	1	(Spain) Xavier Piña Garnatcha	Toyota	6		1	(Spain) Jesus Fuster Pliego	Mercedes-Benz	102	
5	2	(Spain) Juan Morera	Fiat	8	+2	2	(France) Serge Mogno	Toyota	106	+4
5	3	(Czech Republic) Ondřej Klymčiw	Škoda	10	+4	3	(France) Arnaud Euvrard	Mercedes-Benz	192	+90
6	1	(France) Serge Mogno	Toyota	15		1	(Spain) Jesus Fuster Pliego	Mercedes-Benz	120	
6	2	(France) Jérôme Galpin	Protruck	15	0	2	(France) Serge Mogno	Toyota	121	+1
6	3	(Spain) Juan Roura Iglesias	Toyota	17	+2	3	(France) Arnaud Euvrard	Mercedes-Benz	225	+105
7	1	(Spain) Xavier Piña Garnatcha	Toyota	32		1	(France) Serge Mogno	Toyota	206	
7	2	(France) Jérôme Galpin	Protruck	45	+13	2	(France) Arnuad Euvrard	Mercedes-Benz	283	+77
7	3	(France) Marc Douton	Porsche	46	+14	3	(Spain) Juan Roura Iglesias	Toyota	362	+156
8	1	(Spain) Jesus Fuster Pliego	Mercedes-Benz	24		1	(France) Serge Mogno	Toyota	254	
8	2	(France) Arnaud Euvrard	Mercedes-Benz	38	+14	2	(France) Arnaud Euvrard	Mercedes-Benz	321	+67
8	3	(Spain) Miquel Angel Boet	Land Rover	44	+20	3	(Spain) Jordi Celma Obiols	Mercedes-Benz	474	+220
9	1	(France) Marc Douton	Porsche	16		1	(France) Serge Mogno	Toyota	274	
9	2	(Spain) Miquel Angel Boet	Land Rover	19	+3	2	(France) Arnaud Euvrard	Mercedes-Benz	425	+151
9	3	(Spain) Xavier Piña Garnatcha	Toyota	20	+4	3	(Spain) Jesus Fuster Pliego	Mercedes-Benz	597	+323
10	1	(Spain) Xavier Pina Garnatcha	Toyota	29		1	(France) Serge Mogno	Toyota	344	
10	2	(Spain) Jesus Fuster Pliego	Mercedes-Benz	40	+11	2	(France) Arnaud Euvrard	Mercedes-Benz	532	+188
10	3	(France) Marc Douton	Porsche	41	+12	3	(Spain) Jesus Fuster Pliego	Mercedes-Benz	637	+293
11	1	(France) Jérôme Galpin	Protruck	3		1	(France) Serge Mogno	Toyota	354	
11	2	(France) Jean-Michel Gayte	Mitsubishi	6	+3	2	(France) Arnaud Euvrard	Mercedes-Benz	580	+226
11	3	(France) Marc Douton	Porsche	7	+4	3	(Spain) Jesus Fuster Pliego	Mercedes-Benz	675	+321
12	1	(Spain) Juan Roura Iglesias	Toyota	13		1	(France) Serge Mogno	Toyota	399	
12	2	(France) Marc Douton	Porshce	17	+4	2	(France) Arnaud Euvrard	Mercedes-Benz	602	+203
12	3	(Spain) Xavier Pina Garnatcha	Toyota	17	+4	3	(Spain) Jesus Fuster Pliego	Mercedes-Benz	701	+302

== Final standings ==
=== Bikes ===
Final standings (positions 1–10)
Rank	Rider	Bike	Time	Difference
1	(United Kingdom) Sam Sunderland	Gas Gas 450 Rally Factory Replica	38:47:30	–
2	(Chile) Pablo Quintanilla	Honda CRF450R Rally	38:50:57	+0:03:27
3	(Austria) Matthias Walkner	KTM 450 Rally Factory Replica	38:54:17	+0:06:47
4	(France) Adrien Van Beveren	Yamaha WR450F Rally	39:06:11	+0:18:41
5	(Spain) Joan Barreda	Honda CRF450R Rally	39:13:12	+0:25:42
6	(Chile) José Ignacio Cornejo	Honda CRF450R Rally	39:25:36	+0:38:06
7	(United States) Ricky Brabec	Honda CRF450R Rally	39:33:34	+0:46:04
8	(United States) Andrew Short	Yamaha WR450F Rally	39:33:38	+0:46:08
9	(United States) Mason Klein	KTM 450 Rally Factory Replica	39:36:37	+0:49:07
10	(Australia) Toby Price	KTM 450 Rally Factory Replica	39:36:50	+0:49:20

Final standings (positions 11–124)
Rank	Rider	Bike	Time	Difference
11	(Spain) Lorenzo Santolino	Sherco 450 SEF Rally	39:45:56	+0:58:26
12	(Slovakia) Štefan Svitko	KTM 450 Rally Factory Replica	39:46:47	+0:59:17
13	(Argentina) Luciano Benavides	Husqvarna 450 Rally Factory Replica	39:57:49	+1:10:19
14	(Portugal) Joaquim Rodrigues	Hero 450 Rally	40:03:14	+1:15:44
15	(France) Xavier de Soultrait	Husqvarna FR 450 Rally	40:13:55	+1:26:25
16	(South Africa) Aaron Mare	Hero 450 Rally	40:36:30	+1:49:00
17	(Bolivia) Daniel Nosiglia Jager	Rieju 450 Rally	41:02:46	+2:15:16
18	(Poland) Maciej Giemza	KTM 450 Rally Factory Replica	41:15:58	+2:28:28
19	(France) Camille Chapelière	KTM 450 Rally Factory Replica	41:27:00	+2:39:30
20	(Spain) Joan Pedrero García	Rieju 450 Rally	41:28:13	+2:40:43
21	(Portugal) Antonio Maio	Yamaha WR450F Rally	41:33:13	+2:45:43
22	(France) Romain Dumontier	Husqvarna 450 Rally	41:47:46	+3:00:16
23	(Czech Republic) Jan Brabec	KTM 450 Rally Replica	42:00:09	+3:12:39
24	(Portugal) Rui Gonçalves	Sherco 450 SEF Rally	42:00:55	+3:13:25
25	(South Africa) Bradley Cox	KTM 450 Rally Factory Replica	42:03:23	+3:15:53
26	(Argentina) Diego Gamaliel Llanos	KTM 450 Rally Replica	42:05:26	+3:17:56
27	(Poland) Konrad Dąbrowski	KTM 450 Rally Replica	42:39:21	+3:51:51
28	(Lithuania) Arūnas Gelažninkas	KTM 450 Rally Replica	43:11:06	+4:23:26
29	(France) Jean-Loup Lepan	KTM 450 Rally Replica	43:23:06	+4:35:36
30	(Czech Republic) Milan Engel	KTM 450 Rally Replica	43:44:11	+4:56:41
31	(Belgium) Jérôme Martiny	Husqvarna 450 Rally	43:45:10	+4:57:40
32	(France) Julien Jagu	KTM 450 Rally Factory Replica	44:10:55	+5:23:25
33	(France) Benjamin Melot	KTM 450 Rally Replica	44:21:03	+5:33:33
34	(South Africa) Charan Moore	KTM 450 Rally Replica	44:40:02	+5:52:32
35	(France) Mathieu Doveze	KTM 450 Rally Factory Replica	44:44:04	+5:56:34
36	(Czech Republic) Martin Michek	KTM 450 Rally Replica	45:18:10	+6:30:40
37	(United Arab Emirates) Mohammed Balooshi	KTM 450 Rally	45:18:48	+6:31:18
38	(Chile) Patricio Cabrera	KTM 450 Rally	46:41:00	+7:53:30
39	(Kuwait) Mohammed Jaffar	KTM 450 Rally Replica	46:45:06	+7:57:36
40	(Romania) Emanuel Gyenes	KTM 450 Rally Replica	47:07:11	+8:19:41
41	(China) Zaker Yakp	KTM 450 Rally Replica	47:17:41	+8:30:11
42	(Portugal) Mario Patrão	KTM 450 Rally	47:48:33	+9:01:03
43	(France) Charlie Herbst	KTM 450 Rally Replica	47:52:48	+9:05:18
44	(Netherlands) Wiljan van Wikselaar	KTM 450EXC	48:08:43	+9:21:13
45	(Italy) Giovanni Gritti	Honda 450 Rally RX RS	48:29:10	+9:41:40
46	(Botswana) John Kelly	KTM 450 Rally Replica	48:30:21	+9:42:51
47	(United Kingdom) David McBride	Husqvarna 450 Rally	49:01:56	+10:14:26
48	(India) Chethan B D	KTM 450 Rally Replica	49:03:44	+10:16:14
49	(Netherlands) Mirjam Pol	Husqvarna FR 450 Rally	49:23:49	+10:36:19
50	(France) Martin Bonnet	Husqvarna 450 Rally Factory Replica	49:30:51	+10:43:21
51	(Belgium) Mikael Despontin	KTM 450 Rally	49:46:28	+10:58:58
52	(Spain) Marc Calmet	Rieju 450 Rally	50:04:37	+11:17:07
53	(Argentina) Diego Noras	Husqvarna FR 450 Rally	50:11:14	+11:23:44
54	(Slovenia) Simon Marčič	Husqvarna FR 450 Rally	51:07:31	+12:20:01
55	(France) Romain Leloup	KTM 450 Rally Factory Replica	51:12:46	+12:25:16
56	(Morocco) Ali Oukerbouch	KTM 450 Rally Replica	51:13:59	+12:26:29
57	(Belgium) Mathieu Liebaert	KTM 450 Rally Factory Replica	51:38:14	+12:50:44
58	(Argentina) Joaquín Debeljuh Taruselli	KTM 450 Rally Replica	51:40:42	+12:53:12
59	(France) David Gaits	KTM 450 Rally	51:48:42	+13:01:12
60	(Canada) Jack Lundin	Husqvarna FR 450 Rally	52:00:13	+13:12:43
61	(China) Zhang Min	KTM 450 Rally Replica	52:33:04	+13:45:34
62	(Spain) Sandra Gómez	Husqvarna 450 Rally Replica	52:35:47	+13:48:17
63	(Morocco) Harite Gabari	KTM 450 Rally Replica	52:39:24	+13:51:54
64	(France) Jonathan Chotard	KTM 450 Rally Replica	52:48:03	+14:00:33
65	(South Africa) Stuart Gregory	KTM 450 Rally Replica	53:15:02	+14:27:32
66	(Italy) Cesare Zacchetti	KTM 450 Rally	53:20:27	+14:32:57
67	(France) Patrice Carillon	KTM 450 Rally	53:22:30	+14:35:00
68	(Spain) Carles Falcón	KTM 450 Rally Replica	53:52:57	+15:05:27
69	(Portugal) Alexandre Azinhais	KTM 450 Rally	53:54:26	+15:06:56
70	(Greece) Vasileios Boudros	Husqvarna 450 Rally	54:03:47	+15:16:17
71	(Spain) Albert Martín García	Husqvarna 450 Rally Replica	54:17:53	+15:30:23
72	(Italy) Franco Picco	Fantic 450 Rally	54:48:14	+16:00:44
73	(Italy) Francesco Catanese	Honda RMH 450 RX	54:52:48	+16:05:18
74	(Chile) John William Medina Salazar	KTM 450 Rally Replica	54:54:23	+16:06:53
75	(Spain) Sara García	Yamaha WR450F Rally	54:54:24	+16:06:54
76	(Mexico) Juan Pablo Guillén Rivera	KTM 450 Rally	55:04:01	+16:16:31
77	(Chile) César Zumarán	Husqvarna 450 Rally Replica	55:16:31	+16:29:01
78	(Spain) Eduardo Iglesias Sánchez	KTM 450 Rally Factory Replica	55:23:18	+16:35:48
79	(China) Zhao Hongyi	KTM 450 Rally Replica	55:32:24	+16:44:54
80	(Portugal) Arcélio Couto	Honda CRF450RX	55:52:04	+17:04:34
81	(France) Jérémy Poncet	Husqvarna 450 RFR	56:32:43	+17:45:13
82	(France) Sébastien Cojean	Husqvarna FE450	57:05:53	+18:18:23
83	(France) Roch Wolville	Husqvarna 450 Rally	57:18:22	+18:30:52
84	(France) Philippe Cavelius	KTM 450 Rally Replica	57:51:37	+19:04:07
85	(Mongolia) Lkhamaa Namchin	KTM 450 Rally Replica	58:04:27	+19:16:57
86	(South Africa) Walter Terblanche	KTM 450 Rally Replica	58:38:41	+19:51:11
87	(Spain) Javi Vega	Yamaha WR450F Rally	58:52:45	+20:05:15
88	(Italy) Domenico Cipollone	KTM 450 Rally Factory Replica	58:57:17	+20:09:47
89	(France) Samuel Fremy	KTM 450 Rally	59:16:02	+20:28:32
90	(Italy) Danilo Petrucci	KTM 450 Rally Factory Replica	59:30:34	+20:43:04
91	(South Africa) Werner Kennedy	KTM 2022	59:40:39	+20:53:09
92	(Spain) José Arvest Portero	KTM 450 Rally	59:49:01	+21:01:31
93	(France) Julien Barthélémy	Honda CRF450RX Rally RS	60:14:22	+21:26:52
94	(United Kingdom) David Mabbs	KTM 450 Rally	60:18:08	+21:30:38
95	(France) Edouard Leconte	KTM 450 Rally Replica	61:19:06	+22:31:36
96	(Argentina) Matias Notti	KTM 450 Rally	61:48:15	+23:00:45
97	(Italy) Andrea Giuseppe Fili Winkler	KTM 450 Rally Factory Replica	61:50:13	+23:02:43
98	(France) Audrey Rossat	KTM EXCF	62:03:29	+23:15:59
99	(France) Fabrice Chirent	KTM 450EXCF	62:28:16	+23:40:46
100	(Argentina) Kevin Benavides	KTM 450 Rally Factory Replica	62:40:59	+23:53:29
101	(Italy) Lorenzo Piolini	KTM 450 Rally Replica	62:41:19	+23:53:49
102	(France) Dominique Robin	KTM 450 Rally	63:11:43	+24:24:13
103	(Spain) Rachid Al-Lal Lahadil	Husqvarna 450 Rally Replica	63:25:48	+24:38:18
104	(Italy) Tiziano Interno	Husqvarna 450 Rally Factory Replica	64:08:34	+25:21:04
105	(Portugal) Pedro Bianchi Prata	Honda CRF450R	64:39:31	+25:52:01
106	(Serbia) Gabor Saghmeister	KTM 450 Rally Replica	65:05:08	+26:17:38
107	(Ecuador) Alex Mauricio Cueva Ojeda	KTM 450 Rally Replica	65:15:44	+26:28:14
108	(Mongolia) Battur Baatar	KTM 450 Rally	68:37:46	+29:50:16
109	(Germany) Stephan Preuss	KTM 450 Rally	69:07:50	+30:20:20
110	(India) Harith Noah Koitha Veettil	Sherco 450 SEF Rally	72:52:50	+34:05:20
111	(United Kingdom) Simon Hewitt	Yamaha WR450F Rally	74:13:00	+35:25:30
112	(France) Philippe Gendron	KTM 450 Rally Replica	75:46:48	+36:59:18
113	(Switzerland) Nicholas Monnin	Honda 450RX	78:10:42	+39:23:12
114	(Kuwait) Abdullah Al-Shatti	KTM 450 Rally	81:15:39	+42:28:09
115	(Austria) Wolfgang Payr	KTM 450 Rally Factory Replica	81:22:06	+42:34:36
116	(Mozambique) Paulo Olivera	KTM 450 Rally	85:50:59	+47:03:29
117	(France) Patrice Massador	KTM 450 Rally Replica	89:29:15	+50:33:45
118	(Italy) Aldo Winkler	KTM 450 Rally Factory Replica	111:26:30	+72:39:00
119	(Ecuador) Juan Carlos Puga Dávila	Husqvarna 450 Rally Replica	113:15:12	+74:27:42
120	(Italy) Leonardo Tonelli	Husqvarna 450 Rally Factory Replica	122:21:25	+83:33:55
121	(Germany) Thomas Preuss	KTM 450 Rally	139:57:39	+101:10:09
122	(France) Guillaume Chollet	Yamaha WR450F Rally	140:25:14	+101:37:44
123	(France) Stéphane Darques	Yamaha WR450F Rally	158:31:57	+119:44:27
124	(Ecuador) Juan Puga	Husqvarna 450 Rally Replica	203:59:47	+165:12:17

=== Quads ===
Rank	Rider	Bike	Time	Difference
1	(France) Alexandre Giroud	Yamaha YFZ 700	50:00:01	–
2	(Argentina) Francisco Moreno	Yamaha Raptor 700R	52:22:02	+2:21:11
3	(Poland) Kamil Wiśniewski	Yamaha Raptor 700	52:28:16	+2:27:25
4	(Czech Republic) Zdeněk Tůma	Yamaha RR 700	58:09:38	+8:08:47
5	(Argentina) Carlos Alejandro Verza	Yamaha YFM 700R	69:44:03	+19:43:12
6	(Brazil) Marcelo Medeiros	Yamaha YFM 700R	72:05:56	+22:05:05
7	(Colombia) Nicolás Robledo Serna	Can-Am Renegade X XC850	100:26:41	+50:25:50

=== Original by Motol ===
The Original by Motol class, also known as the Malle Moto class, refers to bikes and quads competitors competing without any kind of assistance. The organizers provide 1 trunk per competitor for storage of the personal belongings, spare parts and tools. Competitors are only allowed to bring 1 headlight, 1 set of wheels, 1 set of tyres, 1 tent with sleeping bag and mattress, 1 travel bag and 1x 25 liter (6.6 gallon) backpack. Organizers allow free use of the generators, compressors and tool-boxes in the bivouac.

Rank	Rider	Bike	Time	Difference
1	(Lithuania) Arūnas Gelažninkas	KTM 450 Rally Replica	43:11:06	–
2	(Czech Republic) Milan Engel	KTM 450 Rally Replica	43:44:11	+0:33:05
3	(France) Benjamin Melot	KTM 450 Rally Replica	44:21:03	+1:09:57
4	(South Africa) Charan Moore	KTM 450 Rally Replica	44:40:02	+1:28:56
5	(Romania) Emanuel Gyenes	KTM 450 Rally Replica	47:07:11	+3:56:05
6	(Portugal) Mario Patrão	KTM 450 Rally	47:48:33	+4:37:27
7	(Botswana) John Kelly	KTM 450 Rally Replica	48:30:21	+5:19:15
8	(Slovenia) Simon Marčič	Husqvarna FR450 Rally	51:07:31	+7:56:25
9	(France) Romain Leloup	KTM 450 Rally Replica	51:12:46	+8:01:40
10	(France) David Gaits	KTM 450 Rally	51:48:42	+8:37:36

=== Cars ===
Final standings (positions 1–10)
Rank	Driver	Co-Driver	Car	Time	Difference
1	(Qatar) Nasser Al-Attiyah	(France) Mathieu Baumel	Toyota GR DKR Hilux	38:33:03	–
2	(France) Sébastien Loeb	(Belgium) Fabian Lurquin	BRX Hunter T1+	39:00:49	+0:27:46
3	(Saudi Arabia) Yazeed Al-Rajhi	(United Kingdom) Michael Orr	Toyota Hilux Overdrive	39:34:16	+1:01:13
4	(Argentina) Orlando Terranova	(Spain) Daniel Oliveras Carreras	BRX Hunter T1+	40:00:26	+1:27:23
5	(South Africa) Giniel de Villiers	(South Africa) Dennis Murphy	Toyota GR DKR Hilux	40:14:51	+1:41:48
6	(Poland) Jakub Przygoński	(Germany) Timo Gottschalk	Mini John Cooper Works Buggy	40:26:09	+1:53:06
7	(France) Mathieu Serradori	(France) Loïc Minaudier	Century CR6	41:05:08	+2:32:05
8	(Argentina) Sebastian Halpern	(Argentina) Bernardo Graue	Mini John Cooper Works Buggy	41:11:29	+2:38:26
9	(Sweden) Mattias Ekström	(Sweden) Emil Bergkvist	Audi RS Q e-tron	41:15:14	+2:42:11
10	Vladimir Vasilyev	(Latvia) Oleg Uperenko	BMW X5	41:35:24	+3:02:21

Final standings (positions 11–72)
Rank	Driver	Co-Driver	Car	Time	Difference
11	(Lithuania) Vaidotas Žala	(Portugal) Paulo Fiúza	Mini John Cooper Works Rally	42:04:58	+3:31:55
12	(Spain) Carlos Sainz	(Spain) Lucas Cruz	Audi RS Q e-tron	42:12:24	+3:39:21
13	(France) Michael Pisano	(France) Max Delfino	MD Rallye Sport Optimus	42:14:03	+3:41:00
14	(South Africa) Brian Baragwanath	(South Africa) Leonard Cremer	Century CR6	42:24:29	+3:51:26
15	(South Africa) Shameer Variawa	(South Africa) Danie Stassen	Toyota GR DKR Hilux	42:28:36	+3:55:33
16	(France) Christian Lavieille	(France) Johnny Aubert	MD Rallye Sport Optimus	42:35:45	+4:02:42
17	(Netherlands) Bernhard Ten Brinke	(France) Sébastien Delaunay	Toyota Hilux Overdrive	43:18:43	+4:45:40
18	(Argentina) Lucio Álvarez	(Spain) Armand Monleón	Toyota Hilux Overdrive	43:29:39	+4:56:36
19	(France) Cyril Despres	(Germany) Taye Perry	Peugeot 3008	43:31:25	+4:58:22
20	(Argentina) Juan Cruz Yacopini	(Argentina) Alejandro Miguel Yacopini	Toyota Hilux Overdrive	43:56:18	+5:23:15
21	(France) Pierre Lachaume	(France) Stéphane Duplé	MD Rallye Sport Optimus	44:00:00	+5:26:57
22	(France) Ronan Chabot	(France) Gilles Pillot	Toyota Hilux Overdrive	44:21:49	+5:48:46
23	(Spain) Laia Sanz	(Italy) Maurizio Gerini	Mini All4 Racing	44:51:59	+6:18:56
24	(Czech Republic) Miroslav Zapletal	(Slovakia) Marek Sýkora	Ford F150 Evo	45:09:14	+6:36:11
25	(Czech Republic) Martin Prokop	(Czech Republic) Viktor Chytka	Ford Raptor RS Cross Country	45:17:12	+6:44:09
26	(France) Jean-Rémy Bergounhe	(France) Gérard Dubuy	MD Rallye Sport Optimus	45:41:47	+7:08:44
27	(Spain) Isidre Esteve Pujol	(Spain) Txema Villalobos	Toyota Hilux Overdrive	45:54:43	+7:21:40
28	Denis Krotov	Konstantin Zhiltsov	Mini John Cooper Works Buggy	46:42:09	+8:09:06
29	(South Africa) Christiaan Visser	(South Africa) Rodney Burke	Century CR6	47:30:03	+8:57:00
30	(Brazil) Marcelo Tiglia Gastaldi	(Brazil) Cadu Sachs	Century CR6	49:16:29	+10:43:26
31	(South Africa) Henk Lategan	(South Africa) Brett Cummings	Toyota GR DKR Hilux	50:24:24	+11:51:21
32	(China) Po Tian	(China) Xuanyi Du	SMG HW2021	50:39:06	+12:06:03
33	(Belgium) Erwin Imschoot	(Belgium) Olivier Imschoot	MD Rallye Sport Optimus	51:31:03	+12:58:00
34	(Spain) Óscar Fuertas Aldanondo	(Spain) Diego Vallejo	Century CR6	51:33:35	+13:00:32
35	(Portugal) Miguel Barbosa	(Portugal) Pedro Velosa	Toyota Hilux Overdrive	52:01:19	+13:28:16
36	(Germany) Daniel Schröder	(South Africa) Ryan Bland	Nissan Navara VK50	52:14:41	+13:41:38
37	(China) Wei Han	(China) Li Ma	SMG HW2021	53:00:51	+14:27:48
38	(Japan) Akira Miura	(France) Laurent Lichtleuchter	Toyota Land Cruiser VDJ200	55:54:06	+17:21:03
39	(South Africa) Ernest Roberts	(South Africa) Henry Kohne	Century CR6	56:45:59	+18:12:56
40	(Netherlands) Maik Willems	(Netherlands) Robert van Pelt	Toyota Hilux Overdrive	57:07:46	+18:34:43
41	(Lithuania) Gintas Petrus	(Lithuania) Šarūnas Paliokas	MD Rallye Sport Optimus Evo3	58:52:45	+20:19:42
42	(United Arab Emirates) Khalid Al Qassimi	(Germany) Dirk von Zitzewitz	Peugeot 3008 DKR	59:22:59	+20:49:56
43	(France) Ronald Basso	(France) Jean-Michel Polato	Toyota Land Cruiser VDJ200	59:46:19	+21:13:16
44	(Germany) Markus Walcher	(Germany) Stephan Stensky	Nissan VK56	59:50:54	+21:17:51
45	(Belgium) Alexandre Leroy	(France) Nicholas Delangue	Century CR6	61:22:55	+22:49:52
46	(France) François Cousin	(France) Stéphane Cousin	MD Rallye Sport Optimus	64:23:17	+25:50:14
47	(France) Jean-Philippe Beziat	(France) Vincent Albira	Toyota Hilux Overdrive	66:52:15	+28:19:12
48	(France) Lionel Baud	(France) Jean-Pierre Garcin	Peugeot 3008 DKR	68:51:28	+30:18:25
49	(Lithuania) Antanas Juknevičius	(Latvia) Didzis Zariņš	Toyota Hilux 2016 IRS	69:33:48	+31:00:45
50	(France) Jean-Pierre Strugo	(France) François Borsotto	MD Rallye Sport Optimus	80:21:12	+41:48:09
51	(China) Guoyu Zhang	(China) Hongyu Pan	BAIC BJ40	81:45:52	+43:12:49
52	(Spain) Nani Roma	(Spain) Alex Haro Bravo	BRX Hunter T1+	82:30:33	+43:57:30
53	(Switzerland) Alexandre Pesci	(Switzerland) Stephan Kuhni	Rebellion DXX	85:16:40	+46:43:37
54	(Romania) Mihai Ban	(Romania) Stefan Catalin Ion	Hummer H3	89:58:41	+51:25:38
55	(France) Yves Fromont	(France) Jean Fromont	Volkswagen Original	92:07:48	+53:34:45
56	(France) Hughes Moilet	(France) Antoine Galland	Fouquet Chevrolet FC2	93:56:30	+55:23:27
57	(France) Thierry Richard	(France) Franck Maldonado	BMW EG21A4F Sodicars	94:56:26	+56:23:23
58	(Romania) Iacob Ilie Buhai Hotea	(Romania) Turdean Tudor	Toyota Hilux	95:53:28	+57:20:25
59	(France) Stéphane Peterhansel	(France) Edouard Boulanger	Audi RS Q e-tron	106:45:16	+68:12:13
60	(Italy) Silvio Totani	(Italy) Tito Totani	Nissan Patrol Y61 4.8	111:21:54	+72:48:51
61	(France) Patrick Martin	(France) Lucas Martin	Volkswagen Tarek	112:32:42	+73:59:39
62	(Netherlands) Henri Vansteenbergen	(Netherlands) Eyck Willemse	Rally Raid UK Oryx DW	123:34:58	+85:01:55
63	(South Africa) Schalk Burger	(South Africa) Henk Janse Van Vuuren	Century CR6	127:54:09	+89:21:06
64	(France) Maxime Lacarrau	(France) Frédéric Becart	Toyota Land Cruiser KDJ120	135:53:24	+97:20:21
65	(Paraguay) Andrea Lafarja	(Argentina) Eugenio Andres Arrieta	Borgward BX7 Evo	142:09:44	+103:36:41
66	(Spain) Carlos Checa	(Spain) Ferrán Marco Alcayna	MD Rallye Sport Optimus	143:18:14	+104:45:11
67	(France) Pierre-Guy Cellerier	(France) Franck Cellerier	Bowler	165:56:54	+127:23:51
68	(France) Hervé Quinet	(France) Marie-Laure Quinet	Rally Raid UK Desert Warrior	165:57:09	+127:24:06
69	(France) Marco Piana	(France) Nicolas Garnier	Toyota Land Cruiser	185:58:13	+147:25:10
70	(France) Christophe Girard	(France) Renaud Niveau	Toyota Land Cruiser HDJ100	214:51:18	+176:18:15
71	(Italy) Andrea Schiumarini	(Italy) Stefano Sinibaldi	Mitsubishi Pajero WRC Plus	215:34:00	+177:00:57
72	(Saudi Arabia) Ibrahm Almuhna	(Saudi Arabia) Osama Alsanad	Toyota FJ Cruiser	222:38:48	+184:05:45

=== Light Prototypes ===
Final standings (positions 1–10)
Rank.	Driver	Co-Driver	Car	Time	Difference
1	(Chile) Francisco López Contardo	(Chile) Juan Pablo Latrach Vinagre	Can-Am XRS	45:50:51	–
2	(Sweden) Sebastian Eriksson	(Netherlands) Wouter Rosegaar	Can-Am Maverick X3	46:42:19	+0:51:28
3	(Spain) Cristina Gutiérrez	(France) François Cazalet	OT3-01	50:25:34	+4:34:43
4	(Spain) Santiago Navarro	(Spain) Marc Sola	Can-Am Maverick X3	51:02:26	+5:11:35
5	Pavel Lebedev	Kirill Shubin	Can-Am Maverick	51:43:05	+5:52:14
6	(Italy) Camelia Liparoti	(Spain) Xavier Blanco	Yamaha YXZ 1000R Rally Edition	54:17:02	+8:26:11
7	(United Kingdom) Thomas Bell	(Argentina) Bruno Jacomy	Can-Am Maverick X3	54:25:52	+8:35:01
8	(Saudi Arabia) Dania Akeel	(Uruguay) Sergio Lafuente	Can-Am Maverick X3	55:50:58	+10:00:07
9	(France) Serge Gounon	(France) Pierre-Henri Michel	Can-Am XRS	56:50:09	+10:59:18
10	(France) Lionel Costes	(France) Christophe Tressens	PH-Sport Zephyr	57:24:01	+11:33:10

Final standings (positions 11–37)
Rank	Driver	Co-Driver	Car	Time	Difference
11	(Netherlands) Hans Weijs	(Netherlands) Tim Rietveld	Arcane T3	58:54:31	+13:03:40
12	(France) Geoffrey Moreau	(France) Pascal Chassant	MMP Can-Am	59:05:54	+13:15:03
13	(Portugal) Mario Franco	(Portugal) Rui Franco	Yamaha YXZ 1000R	59:14:34	+13:23:43
14	(Chile) Luis Eguiguren	(Chile) Matías Vicuña	Herrator Inzane X3	59:22:09	+13:31:18
15	(Germany) Annett Fischer	(Sweden) Annie Seel	Yamaha YXZ 1000R Rally Edition	60:27:55	+14:37:04
16	(United States) Seth Quintero	(Germany) Dennis Zenz	OT3-02	60:29:12	+14:38:21
17	(Saudi Arabia) Mashael AlObaidan	(Italy) Jacopo Cerutti	Can-Am Maverick X3	60:30:43	+14:39:52
18	(Spain) Jordi Segura	(Spain) Pedro López Chaves	Can-Am Maverick X3	62:06:02	+16:15:11
19	(France) Gaspard Destailleur	(France) Jean-François Destailleur	Can-Am Maverick X3	64:34:02	+18:43:11
20	(France) Eric Croquelois	(France) Hugues Lapouille	Can-Am Maverick	66:50:16	+20:59:25
21	(France) Jean-Luc Pisson	(France) Jean Brucy	PH-Sport Zephyr	68:11:48	+22:20:57
22	(Spain) Fernando Álvarez	(France) Xavier Panseri	Can-Am Maverick X3	69:03:32	+23:12:41
23	(Netherlands) Michiel Becx	(Netherlands) Edwin Kuijpers	Arcane T3	69:40:17	+23:49:26
24	(France) Hugues Matringhem	(France) Nicolas Tchidemian	Can-Am Maverick X3 XRS	71:52:52	+26:02:01
25	(Czech Republic) Josef Macháček	(Czech Republic) Pavel Vyoral	Buggyra Can-Am DV12	78:12:50	+32:21:59
26	(Switzerland) Paolo Sottile	(Switzerland) Matteo Sottile	Can-Am X3	79:22:31	+33:31:40
27	(France) Patrick Becquart	(France) Romain Becquart	Can-Am Maverick X3 XDS	81:01:51	+35:11:00
28	(Spain) Javier Herrador Calatrava	(Spain) José Lus Rosa Olivera	Herrator Inzane X3	81:32:00	+35:41:09
29	(Colombia) Javier Vélez	(Colombia) Mateo Moreno Kristiansen	Can-Am Maverick X3	84:58:38	+39:07:47
30	(Ecuador) Sebastián Guayasamín	(Argentina) Ricardo Adrian Torlaschi	Can-Am X3	114:28:06	+68:37:15
31	Maria Oparina	(Belarus) Andrei Rudnitski	Can-Am Maverick X3	125:09:51	+79:19:00
32	(Qatar) Ahmed Alkuwari Fahad	(Qatar) Nasser Alkuwari	Yamaha YXZ 1000R SS	132:42:15	+86:51:24
33	(Spain) Mercé Martí	(Andorra) Margot Llobera	Can-Am Maverick X3	135:29:20	+89:38:29
34	(Spain) Pedro Manuel Peñate Muñoz	(Spain) Rosa Romero Font	Can-Am Maverick X3 XRS	173:52:05	+128:01:14
35	Andrey Novikov	Dmitrii Kozhukhov	G-Force T3GF	178:59:10	+133:08:19
36	(France) Pascale Jaffrennou	(France) Françoise Hollender	Pinch Racing T3RR	195:48:44	+149:57:53
37	Boris Gadasin	Dmitry Pavlov	G-Force T3GF	230:03:52	+184:13:01

=== SSVs ===
Final standings (positions 1–10)
Rank	Driver	Co-Driver	Car	Time	Difference
1	(United States) Austin Jones	(Brazil) Gustavo Gugelmin	Can-Am Maverick XRS	47:22:50	–
2	(Spain) Gerard Farrés	(Spain) Diego Ortega Gil	Can-Am Maverick XRS	47:25:27	+0:02:37
3	(Lithuania) Rokas Baciuška	(Spain) Oriol Mena	Can-Am Maverick XRS	47:38:08	+0:15:18
4	(Poland) Marek Goczał	(Poland) Łukasz Łaskawiec	Can-Am Maverick XRS	47:39:11	+0:16:21
5	(Poland) Michał Goczał	(Poland) Szymon Gospodarczyk	Can-Am Maverick XRS	47:51:18	+0:28:28
6	(Brazil) Rodrigo Luppi de Olivera	(Brazil) Maykel Justo	Can-Am Maverick XRS	48:18:34	+0:55:44
7	(Portugal) Luis Portela Morais	(Portugal) David Merge	Can-Am Maverick XRS	50:43:19	+3:20:29
8	(France) Éric Abel	(France) Christian Manez	Can-Am Maverick XRS	52:45:36	+5:22:46
9	(Spain) Joan Lascorz	(Spain) Miguel Puertas Herrera	Can-Am Maverick X3	53:20:49	+5:57:59
10	(Argentina) David Zille	(Argentina) Sebastián Cesana	Can-Am Maverick XRS	53:48:45	+6:15:55

Final standings (positions 11–44)
Rank	Driver	Co-Driver	Car	Time	Difference
11	(France) Rudy Roquesalane	(France) Vincent Ferri	Can-Am Maverick XRS	54:25:34	+7:02:44
12	(Poland) Aron Domżała	(Poland) Marciej Marton	Can-Am Maverick XRS	54:35:43	+7:12:53
13	(Ukraine) Ievgen Kovalevych	(Ukraine) Dmytro Tsyro	Can-Am	54:36:13	+7:13:23
14	(Australia) Molly Taylor	(Australia) Dale Moscatt	Can-Am Maverick XRS	55:00:49	+7:37:59
15	(Lithuania) Tomas Jančys	(Lithuania) Irmantas Bražiūnas	Can-Am Maverick XRS	55:11:33	+7:48:43
16	(Portugal) Rui Olivera	(Spain) Fausto Mota	Can-Am Maverick XRS	56:05:05	+8:42:15
17	(France) Fabrice Lardon	(France) Bruno Bony	Can-Am Maverick XRS	56:50:03	+9:27:13
18	(Italy) Pietro Cinotto	(Italy) Alberto Bertoldi	Polaris RZR Pro XP	56:52:57	+9:30:07
19	(Netherlands) Paul Spierings	(Netherlands) Jan-Pieter van der Stelt	Can-Am Maverick XRS	57:28:59	+10:06:09
20	(Austria) Nicolas Brabeck-Letmathe	(Argentina) Ezequiel Fernández Sasso	Can-Am Maverick XRS	58:03:38	+10:40:48
21	(France) Florent Vayssade	(France) Nicolas Rey	Can-Am Maverick XRS	58:07:40	+10:44:50
22	(France) Frédéric Chesneau	(France) Stéphane Chesneau	Can-Am Maverick	58:35:50	+11:13:00
23	(Spain) Josep Rojas Almuzara	(Spain) Joan Rubí Montserrat	Can-Am Maverick XRS	58:47:31	+11:24:41
24	(France) Benoit Fretin	(France) Cedric Duple	Can-Am Maverick XRS	61:05:28	+13:42:38
25	(Switzerland) Jerome de Sadeleer	(France) Michaël Metge	Can-Am Maverick XRS	62:07:28	+14:44:38
26	(Netherlands) Jan de Wit	(Belgium) Serge Bruynkens	Can-Am Maverick XRS	62:32:13	+15:09:23
27	(Netherlands) Jeffery Otten	(Netherlands) Nicky Zoontjens	Can-Am Maverick XRS	63:17:27	+15:54:37
28	(France) Davy Huguet	(France) Nicolas Falloux	Can-Am XRS	64:45:12	+17:22:22
29	(France) Jean-Claude Plâ	(France) Jérôme Plâ	Polaris RZR Pro XP	67:14:46	+19:51:56
30	Tatiana Sycheva	Aleksandr Alekseev	Can-Am Maverick XRS	68:08:14	+20:45:24
31	(Argentina) Pablo Macua	(Argentina) Mauro Esteban Lípez	Can-Am Maverick XRS	69:38:57	+22:16:07
32	(France) Bruno Fretin	(France) Valentin Sarreaud	Can-Am Maverick XRS	72:44:14	+25:21:24
33	(Japan) Shinsuke Umeda	(Italy) David Giovannetti	Polaris RZR Pro XP	72:46:24	+25:23:34
34	(Spain) Gael Queralt	(Spain) Sergi Brugué	Can-Am Maverick XRS	79:41:46	+32:18:56
35	(France) Ulrich Caradot	(France) Mathieu Bouchut	Can-Am Maverick XRS	81:39:09	+34:16:19
36	(Chile) Lucas del Río	(Chile) Américo Aliaga	Can-Am Maverick XRS	85:07:11	+37:44:21
37	(Netherlands) André Thewessen	(Netherlands) Stijn Bastings	Can-Am Maverick XRS	85:42:14	+38:19:24
38	(France) Jeremy Poret	(France) Brice Aloth	Can-Am Maverick XRS	86:10:21	+38:47:31
39	(France) Baptiste Enjolras	(France) Julien Enjolras	Can-Am Maverick XRS	89:56:47	+42:33:57
40	(France) Christophe Cresp	(France) Serge Henninot	Can-Am Maverick XRS	90:56:22	+43:33:32
41	(France) Gregory Pichon	(France) Jean Pichon	Can-Am Maverick XRS	113:04:16	+65:41:26
42	(Mongolia) Aranzal Gerel	(Mongolia) Ganzorig Temuujin	Can-Am Maverick XRS	113:44:41	+66:21:51
43	(Italy) Michele Cinotto	(Italy) Maurizio Dominella	Polaris Pro XP	115:21:29	+67:58:39
44	(France) Patrice Etienne	(France) Jérôme Bos	Can-Am Maverick XRS	120:03:09	+72:40:19

=== Trucks ===
Final standings (positions 1–10)
Rank	Driver	Co-Driver	Technician	Truck	Time	Difference
1	Dmitry Sotnikov	Ruslan Akhmadeev	Ilgiz Akhmetzianov	Kamaz K5 435091	41:37:34	–
2	Eduard Nikolaev	Evgenii Iakovlev	Vladimir Rybakov	Kamaz K5 435091	41:47:32	+0:09:58
3	Anton Shibalov	Dmitrii Nikitin	Ivan Tatarinov	Kamaz 43509	42:48:45	+1:11:11
4	Andrey Karginov	Andrey Mokeev	Ivan Malkov	Kamaz 43509	43:27:29	+1:49:55
5	(Netherlands) Janus van Kasteren	(Netherlands) Marcel Snijders	(Poland) Darek Rodewald	Iveco PowerStar	44:46:04	+3:08:30
6	(Netherlands) Martin van den Brink	(Belgium) Peter Willemsen	(Netherlands) Bernard Der Kinderen	Iveco PowerStar	45:21:06	+3:43:32
7	(Czech Republic) Martin Macík	(Czech Republic) František Tomášek	(Czech Republic) David Švanda	Iveco PowerStar	46:21:45	+4:44:11
8	(Netherlands) Victor Willem Corne Versteijnen	(Netherlands) Teun van Dal	(Netherlands) Randy Smits	Iveco PowerStar	46:22:08	+4:44:34
9	(Netherlands) Richard de Groot	(Netherlands) Mark Laan	(Netherlands) Jan Hulsebosch	Iveco Magirus 4x4 DRNL	48:07:01	+6:29:27
10	(Netherlands) Mitchel van den Brink	(Netherlands) Rijk Mouw	(Netherlands) Bert Donkelaar	Iveco PowerStar	49:48:08	+8:10:34

Final standings (positions 11–33)
Rank	Driver	Co-Driver	Technician	Truck	Time	Difference
11	(Netherlands) Ben van de Laar	(Netherlands) Jan van de Laar	(United Kingdom) Simon Stubbs	Iveco 4x4 DRNL	50:59:56	+9:22:22
12	(Lithuania) Vaidotas Paškevičius	(Lithuania) Tomas Gužauskas	(Lithuania) Slavomir Volkov	Tatra Jamal	51:25:16	+9:47:42
13	(Netherlands) Kees Koolen	(Netherlands) Wouter de Graaff	(Netherlands) Gijsbert van Uden	Iveco PowerStar	52:56:23	+11:18:49
14	(Netherlands) Pascal de Baar	(Belgium) Jan van der Vaet	(Netherlands) Stefan Slootjes	Renault K520	55:13:59	+13:36:25
15	(Italy) Claudio Bellina	(Italy) Bruno Gotti	(Italy) Giulio Minelli	Iveco PowerStar	56:03:26	+14:25:52
16	(Germany) Mathias Behringer	(Netherlands) Hugo Kupper	(Germany) Robert Striebe	MAN	62:30:01	+20:52:57
17	(Netherlands) Egbert Wingens	(Netherlands) Marije van Ettekoven	(Netherlands) Marijn Beekmans	Iveco Torpedo	65:17:37	+23:40:03
18	(Netherlands) Ben de Groot	(Netherlands) Ad Hofmans	(Netherlands) Govert Boogaard	DAF CF75	69:13:54	+27:36:20
19	(Germany) Michael Baumann	(Germany) Philipp Beier	(Austria) Lukas Raschendorfer	MAN TGA11	70:25:04	+28:47:30
20	(Spain) Jordi Juvanteny	(Andorra) Jordi Ballbé	(Spain) Fina Roman	MAN TGA 26.480	72:31:46	+30:54:12
21	(Czech Republic) Aleš Loprais	(Czech Republic) Petr Pokora	(Czech Republic) Jaroslav Valtr	Praga V4S DKR	76:31:27	+34:53:53
22	(Japan) Teruhito Sugawara	(Japan) Hirokazu Somemiya	(Japan) Yuji Mochizuki	Hino 600-Hybrid	83:20:11	+41:42:37
23	(Netherlands) William de Groot	(Netherlands) Tom Brekelmans	(Netherlands) Remon van der Steen	DAF FT XF105	90:38:52	+49:01:18
24	(Czech Republic) Tomáš Tomeček	(Czech Republic) Leopold Padour	(Italy) Niccolo Funaioli	Tatra 815-2T0R45	94:15:46	+52:38:12
25	(Netherlands) Gerrit Zuurmond	(Netherlands) Tjeerd van Ballegooy	(Netherlands) Klaas Kwakkel	MAN TGA	98:28:21	+56:50:47
26	(France) Sylvain Besnard	(France) Sylvain Laliche	(France) Frédéric Cappucio	MAN TGA114	98:48:29	+57:10:55
27	(Chile) Ignacio Casale	(Chile) Alvaro León	(Czech Republic) Tomáš Šikola	Tatra Phoenix	116:51:01	+75:13:27
28	(Portugal) José Martins	(France) Didier Belvier	(France) Jeremie Gimbre	Iveco Trakker	126:01:42	+84:24:08
29	(Netherlands) Gert Huzink	(Netherlands) Rob Buursen	(Netherlands) Martin Roesink	Renault C460 Hybrid	127:13:40	+85:36:06
30	(Belgium) Dave Berghmans	(Belgium) Tom Geuens	(France) Sam Koopmann	Iveco Trakker	147:49:55	+106:12:21
31	(Germany) Stefan Henken	(Germany) Michael Helminger	(Germany) Ludwig Helminger	MAN TGS 18.480	165:17:17	+123:39:43
32	(France) Richard Gonzalez	(France) Jean-Philippe Salviat	(France) Patrick Prot	DAF TSB	168:21:23	+126:43:49
33	(Spain) Alberto Herrero	(Spain) Borja Rodríguez Rodríguez	(Spain) Mario Rodríguez	Scania Torpedo	180:49:34	+139:12:00

=== Classics ===
Final standings (positions 1–10)
Rank	Driver	Co-Driver	Technician	Vehicle	Points	Difference
1	(France) Serge Mogno	(France) Florent Drulhon	none	Toyota Land Cruiser HDJ80	399	–
2	(France) Arnuad Euvrard	(France) Adeline Euvrard	none	Mercedes-Benz ML	602	+203
3	(Spain) Jesus Fuster Pliego	(Spain) Juan Carlos Ramirez Moure	none	Mercedes-Benz G-320	701	+302
4	(France) Jérôme Galpin	(France) Anne Galpin	none	FJ ProTruck	803	+404
5	(Spain) Kilian Revuelta	(Spain) Mariano De Quadros Romero de la Cruz	none	Toyota Land Cruiser	922	+523
6	(Spain) Xavier Piña Garnatcha	(Spain) Sergi Giralt Valero	none	Toyota Land Cruiser HDJ80	983	+584
7	(Spain) Carlos Santaolalla Milla	(Spain) Aran Sol I Juanola	none	Toyota Land Cruiser KZJ95	983	+584
8	(Belgium) Tom de Leeuw	(Belgium) Cédric Feryn	(Belgium) Bjorn Burgelman	Mercedes-Benz 2635A	1004	+605
9	(France) Marc Douton	(France) Jérémy Athimon	none	Porsche 911 Safari Type G 1985	1050	+651
10	(Netherlands) Alexander Wurfbain	(Netherlands) Onno Den Boer	none	Mercedes-Benz G-280	1095	+696

Final standings (positions 11–129)
Rank	Driver	Co-Driver	Technician	Vehicle	Time	Difference
11	(Lithuania) Valdas Valiukevičius	(Lithuania) Paulius Kavaliauskas	none	Toyota Land Cruiser BJ71	1608	+1209
12	(Belgium) Pascal Feryn	(Belgium) Koen Wauters	none	Toyota Land Cruiser 100	1646	+1247
13	(France) Christophe Jacquot	(France) Éric Simonin	(France) Julien Goumghar	MAN TGE 280	1708	+1309
14	(Czech Republic) Ondřej Klymčiw	(Czech Republic) Tomáš Böhm	none	Škoda LR130	1819	+1420
15	(France) Jean-Yves Capo	(France) Olivier Ponchon	none	Toyota Land Cruiser HDJ80	1866	+1467
16	(Spain) José Vidaña	(Spain) Juan Manuel González Corominas	none	Toyota Land Cruiser KDJ95	1909	+1510
17	(Netherlands) Jack Brouwers	(Netherlands) Gerard van Veenendaal	(Netherlands) Eugene Michael Klutman	GINAF F2222	2134	+1735
18	(Spain) Julián Merino	(Spain) Sonia Merino	none	Toyota Land Cruiser HDJ80	2369	+1970
19	(Czech Republic) Zdeněk Ondráček	(Czech Republic) Rudolf Lhotský	none	Toyota Land Cruiser HDJ80	2453	+2054
20	(France) Thierry Emond	(France) William Lauby	none	Toyota Land Cruiser KDJ95	2540	+2141
21	(Spain) Miquel Angel Boet	(Spain) Aleix Cabarroques Guillem	none	Land Rover Range Rover	2922	+2523
22	(France) François Jacquot	(France) Benoit Juif	none	Peugeot 404	3121	+2722
23	(Spain) Diego Ballester	(Spain) Enrique Conti Penina	none	Land Rover Range Rover	3131	+2732
24	(France) Rudy Jacquot	(France) William Alcaraz	none	Peugeot 205 T16 Grand Raid	3294	+2895
25	(Spain) Javier Basagoiti	(Spain) Alfonso Masoliver	none	Range Rover Classic	3390	+2991
26	(Netherlands) Robert van der Meijden	(Netherlands) Jeroen Sertons	none	Mitsubishi Pajero Evolution V55	3401	+3002
27	(France) Gilles Clochey	(France) Clément Dormoy	none	Toyota Land Cruiser HDJ80	3441	+3042
28	(Switzerland) Cédric Zolliker	(Switzerland) Benoit Burnier	none	Toyota Land Cruiser HDJ80	3634	+3235
29	(Spain) Jordi Celma Obiols	(Spain) Xavi Ribas	(Spain) Jorge Toral	Mercedes-Benz 16-38	3827	+3428
30	(France) Salvatore Rapp	(France) Bruno Grilli	none	Toyota Land Cruiser HDJ80	4222	+3823
31	(Spain) Julio Merino	(Spain) Esther Merino	none	Toyota Land Cruiser HDJ80	4308	+3909
32	(Spain) Juan Donatiú Losada	(Spain) Juan Donatiú Cuello	none	Mitsubishi Montero V6	4315	+3916
33	(France) Jean-Michel Gayte	(France) Maxime Vial	none	Mitsubishi Pajero Evo	4450	+4051
34	(Belgium) Eric Claeys	(Belgium) Tom Claeys	none	Toyota Land Cruiser	4673	+4274
35	(Italy) Antonio Ricciari	(Italy) Marco Giannecchini	none	Mitsubishi Pajero Evolution	4681	+4282
36	(France) Vincent Remblier	(France) Tom Remblier	none	Toyota Land Cruiser VHZJ73	5036	+4637
37	(United States) Amy Lerner	(Belgium) Sara Carmen Bossaert	none	Porsche 911SC	5064	+4665
38	(Spain) Luis Pedrals Marot	(Spain) Gianni Melloni Ribas	none	Nissan Patrol	5297	+4898
39	(Italy) Alberto Morganti	(Italy) Gianluca Ianni	none	Mitsubishi L200 Strakar	5434	+5035
40	(France) Alexandre Lemeray	(France) Fabien Lecaplain	(France) Guillaume Baron	MAN L90	5447	+5048
41	(Spain) Dionisio Alberto Santos Moreno	(Spain) Iñigo García Cuellar	none	Toyota Land Cruiser HDJ100	5536	+5137
42	(Netherlands) Bart Rietbergen	(Germany) Frank Wiest	none	Mitsubishi Pajero	5545	+5146
43	(France) Michel Blanc	(France) Frédéric Benedetti	none	Nissan Dessoude Patrol	5754	+5355
44	(France) Lionel Guy	(France) Isabelle Masse	none	Land Rover Range Rover	5874	+5475
45	(Italy) Andrea Alfano	(Italy) Simona Morosi	(Italy) Luca Macrini	Mercedes-Benz Unimog	6021	+5622
46	(Sweden) Eje Elgh	(Sweden) Alexander Elg	none	Nissan Patrol	6149	+5750
47	(Spain) Francesc Guillem	(Spain) Alex Rabell	none	Mercedes-Benz Unimog U1300L	6156	+5757
48	(Spain) Lluís Rodríguez Boldú	(Spain) Tomaso Fenaroli Sánchez	none	Toyota Land Cruiser HDJ80	6159	+5760
49	(Italy) Gian Paolo Tobia Cavagna	(Italy) Gianni Pelizzola	none	Nissan Patrol GR Y61	6285	+5886
50	(Greece) Evangelos Bersis	(Greece) Fotios Koutsoumbos	none	Mitsubishi Pajero	6517	+6118
51	(Slovakia) Juraj Ulrich	(Slovakia) Lubos Schwarzbacher	none	Mitsubishi Pajero 3000 L141G	6521	+6122
52	(France) Henri Vergari	(France) Gautier Vergari	none	Toyota Land Cruiser HDJ80	7622	+7223
53	(Netherlands) Herman van Oldenmark	(Netherlands) Ad van der Werf	none	Mitsubishi Pajero Evolution	7745	+7346
54	(France) Franck Puchouau	(France) Arnaud Ayala	(France) Laurent Correia	Renault Kerax	8006	+7607
55	(Spain) Noemí Rodríguez Moreno	(Spain) Raúl Guzmán Villa	none	Nissan Patrol	8052	+7653
56	(Italy) Stefano Calzi	(Italy) Umberto Fiori	none	Mitsubishi Pajero MPR51	8192	+7793
57	(Switzerland) Antonio Garzon	(Switzerland) Guillermo Baeza	none	Toyota Land Cruiser HJD80	8386	+7987
58	(Belgium) Diego Delespeaux	(France) Bertrand Droupsy	none	Volkswagen Coccinelle	8891	+8492
59	(Spain) Francesc Termens	(Spain) Manuel Navarro Dominguez	none	Nissan Patrol	9489	+9090
60	(France) Maxime Lorenzini	(France) Daniel Lorenzini	none	Toyota Land Cruiser HDJ80	9731	+9332
61	(United Kingdom) Richard Worts	(United Kingdom) Nicola Shackleton	none	Mitsubishi Pajero V55	10264	+9865
62	(France) Arnaud Delmas-Marsalet	(France) Lucas Delmas-Marsalet	none	Toyota Land Cruiser HZJ78	10838	+10439
63	(Belgium) René Declercq	(Belgium) John Demeester	none	Bombardier Iltis	11258	+10859
64	(Belgium) Michel Teerlinck	(Belgium) Patrick Lammens	none	Toyota Land Cruiser HJ70	11261	+10862
65	(France) Laurent Beraud	(France) Maxime Beraud	none	Toyota Land Cruiser HZJ78	11986	+11587
66	(Italy) Tommaso Castellazzi	(Italy) Stefano Dalla Valle	none	Land Rover Defender 90	12250	+11851
67	(Netherlands) Kornelis Offringa	(Netherlands) Miranda van Middendorp	none	Mercedes-Benz Unimog 1999	12356	+11957
68	(Italy) Lorenzo Traglio	(Italy) Adriano Furlotti	none	Nissan Terrano II	12688	+12289
69	(France) Laurent Auboueix	(France) Romain Hedin	none	Mercedes-Benz Koro 280GE	13117	+12718
70	(France) Gilles Girousse	(France) Delphine Delfino	none	Mercedes-Benz Koro	13841	+13442
71	(Germany) Mirko Ürmosi	(Germany) Edith Nenninger	none	Toyota Land Cruiser HDJ80	14659	+14260
72	(Netherlands) Michiel Kuijs	(Netherlands) Geert van Genugten	(Netherlands) Maikel Neijenhuis	DAF	15045	+14646
73	(France) Audrey Sireyjol	(France) Patrick Sireyjol	none	Toyota Land Cruiser	16857	+16458
74	(France) Philippe Clamens	(France) Cécile Douchez	none	Mercedes-Benz G	19387	+18988
75	(Germany) Rainer Wissmanns	(France) Claire Deygas	none	Toyota Land Cruiser	19997	+19598
76	(Italy) Agostino Rizzardi	(Italy) Alberto Vassallo	none	Porsche 911	20715	+20316
77	(Ukraine) Serhii Malyk	(Ukraine) Liubomyr Shumakov	(Ukraine) Serhi Martovenko	Renault Kerax	21817	+21418
78	(Spain) Rafael Preigo García	(Spain) Facun Vitoria Salaberria	none	Toyota Land Cruiser HDJ100	22149	+21750
79	(France) Vincent Tourneur	(France) Christian Lambert	none	Mitsubishi Pajero T2	22285	+21886
80	(Portugal) João António de Almeida e Sousa	(Portugal) Luis Manuel da Costa Santos	none	SsangYong Musso	22583	+22184
81	(France) Tenessy Grezes	(France) Lucas Longepe	none	Toyota Land Cruiser BJ73	23071	+22672
82	(Italy) Guido Dallarosa	(Italy) Luigi Capitani	none	Nissan Patrol 4.5	25461	+25062
83	(France) Yannick Commagnac	(France) Didier Lachaud	none	Toyota Land Cruiser HJ61	25543	+25144
84	(Germany) Carsten Hesz	(Netherlands) Bernard Caspers	none	Mitsubishi Pajero Evolution	25603	+25204
85	(Germany) Jörg Sand	(Germany) Bastian Klausing	none	Mercedes-Benz 280GE	26060	+25661
86	(Spain) Juan Roura Iglesias	(Spain) Miguel Ángel Valencia Posada	none	Toyota Land Cruiser HDJ80	26268	+25869
87	(France) Eric Pinson	(France) Laurent Hertzog	none	BCBG	27173	+26774
88	(Italy) Luciano Carcheri	(Italy) Giulia Maroni	none	Nissan Terrano 1	27522	+27123
89	(Italy) Corrado Pattono	(Italy) Piermarco Acerni	none	Mercedes-Benz Unimog	30785	+30386
90	(Slovakia) Radovan Kazarka	(Czech Republic) Josef Kalina	(Slovakia) Robert Kasák	Tatra 815	31369	+30970
91	(Austria) Peter Brabeck-Letmathe	(Spain) Daniel Lopez-Palao	none	Mitsubishi Pajero	31706	+31307
92	(Spain) Antonio Gutiérrez	(Spain) Luis Heras Rodriguez	none	Mercedes-Benz G-320	32465	+32066
93	(France) Yannick Grezes	(France) Anthony Drapeau	none	Suzuki Vitara	32667	+32268
94	(Spain) Enrique Mayor	(Spain) Xavier Romero Soler	none	Mercedes-Benz G	33408	+33009
95	(France) Jean-François Bottiau	(France) Eric Bottiau	none	Toyota Land Cruiser 100	34433	+34034
96	(Spain) Antonio García Coma	(Spain) Florencio Rius Planas	none	Toyota Land Cruiser HDJ80	39811	+39412
97	(Germany) Christian Ruppert	(Germany) Ursula Ruppert	none	Mercedes-Benz GE-280	39887	+39488
98	(Italy) Elio Moro	(Italy) Elena Giaveri	none	Suzuki Vitara	43488	+43089
99	(Spain) Carles Pujolar Rigat	(Spain) Gerard Alsina Sala	none	Proto Ipso Leclerc Rally	46755	+46356
100	(Spain) Daniel Albero Puig	(Spain) Jorge Vera	none	Toyota Land Cruiser 90	48059	+47660
101	(Spain) Manuel Capelo	(Spain) Emilio Benito Capelo	none	Fiat Panda Sisley	48938	+48539
102	(France) Gilles Espinosa	(France) Laurent Milbergue	none	Land Rover Range Rover	49921	+49522
103	(France) Gildas Carnet	(France) Juliette Carnet	(France) Guislaine Broquet-Paget	MAN KAT	51818	+51419
104	(Germany) Alexander Paas	(Germany) Rudolf Krümmel	(Germany) Matthias Hertwig	MAN KAT1 6x6	53332	+52933
105	(France) Romain Grabowski	(France) Constance Chenard	none	Lada Niva	55716	+55317
106	(Spain) Juan Morera	(Spain) Lidia Ruba	none	Fiat Panda 4x4	56314	+55915
107	(Switzerland) Philippe Maréchal	(Switzerland) Jean-François Baud	none	Land Rover Range Rover	59083	+58684
108	(France) Olivier Guérin	(France) Thierry Delgutte	none	Chevrolet Silverado	61400	+61001
109	(Spain) Miguel Merino	(Spain) Olga Merino	none	Toyota Land Cruiser HDJ80	62198	+61799
110	(France) Stephan Lamarre	(France) Alexandre Laroche	none	Sunhill Buggy	62705	+62306
111	(Italy) Giacomo Clerici	(Italy) Oscar Polli	none	Nissan Terrano 1	63082	+62683
112	(Italy) Roberto Camporese	(Italy) Federico Didone	none	Peugeot 504 Pickup	68545	+68146
113	(Netherlands) Ben de Paauw	(Netherlands) Peter de Paauw	none	Mitsubishi Pajero	68759	+68360
114	(Italy) Rebecca Busi	(Italy) Roberto Musi	none	Land Rover Range Rover	70628	+70229
115	(Switzerland) Mario Jacober	(Switzerland) Sladan Miljic	none	Lada Niva	75201	+74802
116	(Italy) Ernst Amort	(Germany) Adolf Ruhaltinger	none	Peugeot 504 Coupé	76329	+75840
117	(Czech Republic) Martin Čábela	(Czech Republic) Olga Lounová	none	Mercedes-Benz G500	76814	+76415
118	(France) Hervé Cotel	(France) Philippe Patenotte	none	Cotel Buggy	76863	+76464
119	(Czech Republic) František Randýsek	(Czech Republic) Dušan Randýsek	none	Land Rover Series II	78399	+78000
120	(France) Patrick Doby	(France) André Terrier	none	Toyota Land Cruiser HDJ80	81113	+80714
121	(Czech Republic) Petr Fiala	(Czech Republic) Tomas Fiala	none	Land Rover Series II	92883	+92484
122	(Germany) Fritz Becker	(Romania) Ilie Constanţa	none	Toyota Land Cruiser	96097	+95698
123	(Spain) Ignacio Corcuera	(Spain) Oscar Ordoñez Vazquez	none	Toyota Land Cruiser BJ40	97400	+97001
124	(Spain) Francisco del Pozo Martinez	(Spain) Daniel Cesteros García	(Spain) Gustavo Castro Rodríguez	Pegaso 2223	109312	+108913
125	(France) Jean-Paul Lacombe	(France) Adrien Lacombe	none	Mitsubishi Pajero T1B	115240	+114841
126	(Spain) Christian Almansa	(Spain) Javier Monje	(Italy) Carlo Miniotti	Pegaso Egipcio	118546	+118147
127	(Czech Republic) Olga Roučková	(Czech Republic) Robert Knobloch	none	Suzuki Samurai	139942	+139543
128	(Netherlands) Cornelis Lambert Kamp	(Netherlands) Jacobine Kamp-Noordsij	none	Citroën CX	143216	+142817
129	(Czech Republic) Albert Pance	(Czech Republic) Stepan Pance	none	Land Rover Series II	180386	+179987

== Incidents ==
On 30 December, a support vehicle with 6 competitors, including one driver, Philippe Boutron, exploded outside Donatello Hotel in Jeddah. Philippe Boutron sustained leg injuries and underwent an operation, while the others were unharmed. The news were only released on 1 January, meanwhile Saudi Arabia police ruled out criminal activity. FIA and ASO issued a statement expressing that "malice couldn't be ruled out at this time" and raised security level in the bivouacs, hotels and along all of the route. Later the organizers advised competitors to "observe the greatest vigilance" in light of the incident. On 4 January, French prosecutors opened an investigation on the incident, while on 7 January, French minister of Foreign Affairs stated that the incident was "perhaps" a terrorist attack and demanded more investigation and transparency from Saudi Arabia government.

Another vehicle was caught in a fire incident the same day - Alexander Pesci's Rebellion DXX buggy caught fire during the shakedown due to electrical fault, and was completely destroyed. Alexander Pesci took over teammate's Romain Dumas Rebellion DXX, while Romain Dumas was offered Nasser Al-Attiyah's previous year's Toyota Hilux.

Giniel de Villiers received penalties for collisions on consecutive stages. On stage 1, de Villiers collided with motorcyclist César Zumaran and did not stop to offer assistance. Race organizers assigned a five-minute penalty for the incident. During the next day's stage, de Villiers collided with motorcyclist Mohamedsaid Aoulad Ali, in the process running over Ali's bike and rendering it unusable. de Villiers circled around to check on the status of the rider, but again did not stop to offer assistance. Race organizers assigned a harsher five-hour penalty for de Villiers' repeat offense. In addition, de Villiers came to an agreement with Ali to fully pay for repairs of the damaged bike and for Ali's registration fee for the 2023 running of the Dakar. The five-hour penalty was reversed by the FIA 2 days later, after de Villiers' team presented evidence that the standard in-car warning system did not sound until 2 seconds before the collision with Ali's bike.

Quad rider Toni Vingut crashed out on stage 2 and suffered two cracked ribs and a fracture in the fibula of his right leg. He was evacuated in the emergency helicopter to a hospital.

During Stage 4 on January 5, Belgian motorcyclist Walter Roelants suffered a crash past the 198 km point of the stage. Roelants suffered serious back injuries, but remained conscious and indicated that he still had feeling in his legs. He was evacuated from the stage by helicopter and taken to hospital in stable condition.

American motorcyclist Skyler Howes finished stage 5 with head, ankle and shoulder injuries, but without any memory of a crash. After medical inspection, he was not allowed to continue race.

Jean-Pascal Besson and co-driver Patrice Roissac were involved in a heavy crash on stage 5. Both participants were reported unconscious, and were airlifted to hospital. Besson suffered broken collarbone, while Roissac suffered back injury.

On Stage 6 on January 7, the bikes and quads route was ended early due to numerous crashes caused by the deterioration of the stage from the previous day's pass by cars and trucks. Among those involved was Botswanan motorcyclist Ross Branch, who had to be transported back to the bivouac following a crash.

En route to the early morning start of the stage 7 Gas Gas rider Daniel Sanders suffered a serious high-speed fall and was taken to hospital with a broken hand.

A head-on collision occurred on stage 7 between the SSV driven by Sergey Karyakin and the light-proto driven by Marco Carrara. Both vehicles were taking a sharp turn behind a rock and were only several meters away from each other before they could take any action to avoid the collision. Both drivers argued their point, and ultimately blamed the organizers for poor quality of the roadbook directions. The accident caused spinal injuries to Carrara's co-driver Enrico Gaspari, while Karyakin suffered a broken finger while making repairs to the damaged vehicle.

Dakar rookie bike rider Isaac Feliu suffered a heavy fall on stage 9, causing trauma to head and chest. Another rider, Harite Gabari stopped to assist, and called the emergency services. The emergency helicopter delivered Feliu to hospital, where his condition is described serious, but as not posing danger to life.

During the liaison for stage 12, a collision occurred between an assistance car for the PH-Sport team and a truck driven by a local resident. Quentin Lavallée, the chief mechanic for the #726 Peugeot 205 T16 for the PH-Sport team, was killed in the crash. Passenger Maxime Frère also suffered injuries in the accident, but remained conscious and was transported to hospital.
