= 2020 Dakar Rally =

Off-road motorsport event in Saudi Arabia

Part of the Dakar Rally
← Previous event	Next event →
- Host country: Saudi Arabia
- Dates run: 5–17 January 2020
- Start: (Saudi Arabia) Jeddah
- Finish: (Saudi Arabia) Al-Qiddiya
- Stages: 12
- Stage surface: Sand, rocks, dirt, tarmac

Results
- Cars winner: (Spain) Carlos Sainz (Spain) Lucas Cruz; Bahrain JCW X-Raid
- Bikes winner: (United States) Ricky Brabec; Monster Energy Honda
- Quads winner: (Chile) Ignacio Casale; Casale Racing
- Trucks winner: (Russia) Andrey Karginov (Russia) Andrey Mokeev (Russia) Igor Leonov; Kamaz-Master
- UTVs winner: (United States) Casey Currie (United States) Sean Berriman; Monster Energy Can-Am
- Crews: 351 at start, 226 at finish

The 2020 Dakar Rally was the 42nd edition of the event and the first edition held in Saudi Arabia. The event started in Jeddah on 5 January and finished in Al-Qiddiya on 17 January after 12 stages of the competition.

This was also the first event under the direction of David Castera, who replaced Etienne Lavigne when he stepped down from the role in March 2019 after 15 years in charge.

Spaniard Carlos Sainz won his fourth Dakar (counting the 2008 Central Europe Rally, which legally was that year's Dakar) with a third different make, his first with the new Mini JCW X-Raid buggy. In the motorcycle class, American Ricky Brabec became the first person from North America to win any class in the Dakar Rally. It was also the first victory for Honda since 1989 and ended a streak of 18 consecutive wins for KTM. In trucks, Russian Andrey Karginov took his second Dakar win, while Kamaz won their 17th as a manufacturer. Chilean rider Ignacio Casale won his third Dakar rally in the quad category after returning from his brief foray into the UTV class in 2019. American Casey Currie took victory in the UTV class, marking the first American victory there.

The rally was marred by the fatal accidents of Portuguese motorcyclist Paulo Gonçalves on stage 7 and Dutch motorcyclist Edwin Straver on stage 11.

== Summary ==
=== Host country selection ===
After 11 years in South America, the event was held in the Asian continent for the first time ever. Organisers admitted that there was "hesitation" before the decision to hold the event in a country which has been under fire over human rights abuses and its recent involvement in the war in Yemen. The contract to host the event in Saudi Arabia has been signed for the next five years, although it is rumoured that the agreement is actually for ten years. The event had been looking for alternatives, as it is believed that the relationships between the A.S.O. and South American governments have degraded over the last few years for a variety of reasons, including the disqualification of Bolivian favourite Juan Carlos Salvatierra from the quad class in 2019.

=== The route ===
Total rally distance was close to 7,900 km (4,900 mi), with 5,000 km (3,100 mi) of special stages. The rally started from Jeddah, headed north along the Red Sea, passed through Red Sea Project towards ambitious city project Neom. The rally turn east, towards capital Riyadh. After the rest day the rally headed south to the Arabian Desert, across the dunes of the Empty Quarter, then south-east into the Eastern Province as far as Shubaytah, and then back north-west to finish in Qiddiya City. David Castera, director of the Dakar said "I'm already inspired and delighted to have to design a course in such a monumental geography, made for the most audacious itineraries. We are spoilt for choice. Sports, navigation, a will to surpass oneself: all these aspects will naturally be glorified on this territory made for rally-raids.”

=== The competitors ===
Many well known rally drivers entered this edition, including 13-time winner Stephane Peterhansel, and previous year's winner Nasser Al-Attiyah. Former Formula One champion Fernando Alonso make a debut in the event in car category. The official entry list consisted of 351 vehicles (vs 334 in 2019). The entry list consisted of 557 competitors, which represented 53 nationalities. Most dominant was French with 258 entries, followed by Spanish 77 and the Dutch 53. As the rally moved out of South America, the proportion of South American entrants had logically decreased, however it had still strong with 42 vehicle entries. The most significant increase was from host country Saudi Arabia - 18 (13 drivers/riders and 5 navigators). 65 competitors took part in Dakar rallies on four continents. The oldest contestant was 73 years old, while the youngest turned 18 during the event. There were 13 female contestants.

=== Changes in regulations ===
Several new formats were introduced in this edition of the rally. The road books, which are now in color, on six stages were handed out 15 minutes prior to the start of the timed sector. The aim was reduce competitive advantage of the big teams and to rebalance the parameters in favour of the less professional entries. In order to eliminate cheating with technology only affordable by the largest teams, all unapproved competitor electronic devices needed to be locked in a sealed compartment during the race. Also, the organizers placed cameras inside top 19 participant vehicles to be able to review footage if suspicion arises. On top of already traditional all vehicle marathon stage, a motorcycle "Super Marathon" stage was introduced, where only 10 minutes of work on the machines were allowed. Compulsory bike and quad 15 min. breaks while refueling were now extended to all vehicle categories. Competitors who were forced to retire will be permitted to re-join the rally in the “Dakar Experience” classification, similar to the "Rally 2" classification used in the World Rally Championship. This year all UTV's were homogenized into a single FIA T3 category for lightweight buggies (< 900 kg) with an engine size less than 1,000 cc. Fitted with restrictors, UTV's were sub-categorized into T3.S (production vehicles) limited to 120 km/h and T3.P (prototypes) limited to 130 km/h.

== Entry lists ==
=== Last minute changes ===
French motorcycle rider Michael Metge has announced that he is withdrawing from entering the event due to knee injury. His brother Adrien Metge took his place. Polish motorcycle rider Jackek Bartoszek also suffered a knee injury while training, and was not able to start.

Another Polish sportsman Sebastian Rozwadowski, co-driver to Benediktas Vanagas became ill with tropical virus while on holidays, and was forced to withdraw. Last year 11-th placed Benediktas Vanagas managed to reach agreement with Filipe Palmeiro as his replacement co-driver. Filipe was to start the event as Boris Garafulic co-driver until Boris announced his withdrawal from 2020 rally due to political situation in Chile. Stéphane Peterhansel was due to start with his wife Andrea as co-driver, however, pre-race medical tests revealed a health concern, and Andrea withdrew. Stephane's new co-pilot became Paulo Fiúza, although they both lack fluency in English, their common language.

During the shakedown three days before the start Martin Kolomý crashed his Ford Raptor. In addition to injuring his back, the rollcage of his vehicle was damaged enough to rule him out of starting the rally.

In UTV category Cyril Despres got the last minute call-up to start in OT3 buggy with co-driver Mike Horn. Artur Ardavichus could not resolve issues with his license in time and gave up his place in the team to fellow-Kazakh Denis Berezovskiy.

=== Number of entries ===
Stage	Bikes	Quads	Cars	UTVs	Trucks	Total
Entry list	147	23	89	45	47	351
At start line	144	23	83	46	46	342
Rest day	108^{(120)}	15^{(21)}	64^{(76)}	32^{(39)}	30^{(35)}	249^{(291)}
At finish line	96	12	58	31	29	226
Completed "Dakar Experience"	4	5	4	3	3	19

Note: The number in brackets includes participants in "Dakar Experience" class.

=== Vehicles and Categories ===
In 2020 event the major vehicle categories were motorbikes, quads, cars, UTV's and trucks. The vehicles are further divided into classes and subcategories in accordance to FIA homologation.

G1 - the "Elite" motorbike group. Defined by A.S.O. "Elite" riders have all finished in the Top 10 in the general classification or have at least won a special stage in the past few years. All motorbike classes have engine capacity limited to 450cc.

G2 - the "Non-Elite" motorbike group. This subcategory sometimes called the "Super Production". To participate, the rider must have already finished at least one round of the FIM Cross-Country World Cup or a "Dakar Series" race. Another subcategory is the "Marathon" sub-class, restrictions on which components may be changed during the race applies to competitors in this category.

G3 - the quad class. Quads are subdivided into the two-wheel drive quads with engine capacity limited to 750cc and the four-wheel drive quads with engine capacity limited to 900cc.

T1 - the most common Cars class, it is a prototype vehicle, built of a tubular frame, with fiberglass or carbon bodywork shell. They commonly have a "silhouette" of a production vehicle, but in reality only a few decorative parts in common, such as lights and grille. T1 is further subdivided into petrol/diesel and 2WD/4WD subcategories.

T2 - are production vehicles modified for competition in Cars class. The FIA regulations are very strict about what can and cannot be modified or up-rated. Typical modifications include roll cage, "bucket" seats with racing safety harness, competition fuel tanks.

T3 - are lightweight prototype vehicles, often equipped with motorcycle engines. Since 2017 the T3's are classified in a separate UTV (sometimes called SSV or SxS (side by side)) category.

T4 - is the truck category. The production-based trucks that meet FIA regulations are in T4.1 subcategory. Not many compete in the Dakar Rally because they are not very suitable for crossing dunes. T4.2, the most common category is created by the Dakar Rally organizers. These are prototype trucks, with cab and certain components standard. There is also T4.3 "rapid assistance" vehicles. They are essentially mobile workshops on T4.1 or T4.2 base, built to carry parts and assist their teams vehicles in other categories.

OPEN - includes vehicles meeting technical standards different from those of the FIA, such as the American SCORE regulation, electric vehicles or powered by alternative energy sources. Beginning with the 2019 Dakar Rally, UTV's that meet national regulations are also allowed under this category.

Category	Bikes		Quads		Cars		UTVs		Trucks	
	Class	Description	Class	Description	Class	Description	Class	Description	Class	Description
	G1.1	"Elite"	G3.1	750cc 2WD quads	T1.1	T1 petrol 4x4 modified	T3.S	Production UTVs	T4.1	Production Trucks
	G2.1	"Non-Elite"	G3.2	900cc 4WD quads	T1.2	T1 diesel 4x4 modified	T3.P	Prototype UTVs	T4.2	Modified Trucks
	G2.2	"Non-Elite" "Marathon"			T1.3	T1 petrol 2WD modified			T4.3	Rapid Assistance Vehicles
					T1.4	T1 diesel 2WD modified				
					T1.5	T1 with SCORE approval				
					T2.1	T2 petrol production				
					T2.2	T2 diesel production				
					T2.C	T2 production other^{see note}				
					TAS	Special Stage Assistance				
					OP.1	Renewable Energy Powered				

Note: T2.C category is T2 production vehicles with obsolete FIA approval

=== Bikes ===
Entry list — Bikes

Note
The "Dakar Legends" - competitors that participated in 10 or more Dakar events - are marked in yellow.
The first time starters - "rookies" - are marked in blue.
In orange are marked the competitors participating in "Original by Motul" - limited assistance marathon class.

No.	Driver	Country	Vehicle	Team
1	Toby Price	Australia	KTM 450	Red Bull KTM Factory Team
2	Matthias Walkner	Austria	KTM 450	Red Bull KTM Factory Team
3	Sam Sunderland	United Kingdom	KTM 450	Red Bull KTM Factory Team
4	Adrien Van Beveren	France	Yamaha WR450F	Monster Energy Yamaha Rally Team
5	Pablo Quintanilla	Chile	Husqvarna FR 450 Rally	Rockstar Energy Husqvarna Factory Racing
6	Andrew Short	USA	Husqvarna FR 450 Rally	Rockstar Energy Husqvarna Factory Racing
7	Kevin Benavides	Argentina	Honda CRF 450 Rally	Monster Energy Honda Team 2020
8	Paulo Gonçalves †	Portugal	Hero 450 Rally	Hero Motosports Team Rally
9	Ricky Brabec	USA	Honda CRF 450 Rally	Monster Energy Honda Team 2020
10	Xavier de Soultrait	France	Yamaha WR450F Rally	Monster Energy Yamaha Rally Team
11	Adrien Metge	France	Sherco TVS 450 RTM	Sherco TVS Rally Factory
12	Joan Barreda Bort	Spain	Honda CRF 450 Rally	Monster Energy Honda Team 2020
14	Laia Sanz	Spain	KTM 450	Gas Gas Factory Team
16	Luciano Benavides	Argentina	KTM 450	Red Bull KTM Factory Team
17	José Ignacio Cornejo Florimo	Chile	Honda CRF 450 Rally	Monster Energy Honda Team 2020
18	Ross Branch	Botswana	KTM 450 Rally Factory Replica	Bas Dakar KTM Racing Team
19	Štefan Svitko	Slovakia	KTM 450 Rally Replica	Slovnaft Rally Team
20	Johnny Aubert	France	Sherco TVS 450	Sherco TVS Rally Factory
21	Daniel Nosiglia Jager	Bolivia	Honda CRF 450 Rally	Team Honda Nosiglia
22	Franco Caimi	Argentina	Yamaha WR450F Rally	Monster Energy Yamaha Rally Team
23	Ivan Jakeš	Slovakia	KTM 450 Rally Replica	Jakes Dakar Team
24	Lorenzo Santolino	Spain	Sherco TVS 450 RTR	Sherco TVS Rally Factory
25	Juan Pedrero Garcia	Spain	KTM 450 Rally	Ls2 Aventura Touareg
26	Aaron Mare	South Africa	Honda CRF 450 Rally	Monster Energy Honda Team 2020
27	Joaquim Rodrigues	Portugal	Hero 450 Rally	Hero Motosports Team Rally
28	Jamie Mccanney	United Kingdom	Yamaha WRF 450	Monster Energy Yamaha Rally Team
29	Milan Engel	Czech Republic	KTM 450 Rally Replica	Moto Racing Group (mrg)
30	Adam Tomiczek	Poland	Husqvarna FR 450 RR	Orlen Team
31	Mario Patrão	Portugal	KTM 450	KTM Factory Team
32	Sebastian Bühler	Germany	Hero 450 Rally	Hero Motosports Team Rally
33	Loic Minaudier	France	KTM 450 Rally Replica	Team All Tracks
34	Arūnas Gelažninkas	Lithuania	KTM Rally Replica	Arūnas Gelažninkas
35	Maciej Giemza	Poland	Husqvarna FR 450 RR	Orlen Team
36	Mohammed Balooshi	United Arab Emirates	Husqvarna FR 450	Duust Rally Team
37	Paul Spierings	Netherlands	Husqvarna FR 450 Rally	Ht Rally Raid Husqvarna Racing
38	Fausto Mota	Spain	Husqvarna 450 Rally Replica	Xraids Team
39	Benjamin Melot	France	KTM 450 Rally Replica	Benjamin Melot
40	Edwin Straver †	Netherlands	KTM 450RR	Edwin Straver
41	Jacopo Cerutti	Italy	Husqvarna FR 450 Rally	Solarys Racing
42	Maurizio Gerini	Italy	Husqvarna Husqvarna 450 Rally	Solarys Racing
43	Jan Brabec	Czech Republic	KTM 450 Rally	Big Shock Racing
44	Emanuel Gyenes	Romania	KTM 450 Rally Replica	Autonet Motorcycle Team
45	Arnold Brucy	France	KTM 450 Replica	Brucy Racing Team
46	Mauricio Javier Gomez	Argentina	Yamaha WR 450F Rally Replica	Paco Gomez
47	Garrett Poucher	USA	KTM 450 Rally	Klymciw Racing
49	Nicolas Brabeck-Letmathe	Austria	KTM 450 RR	Team Casteu
50	Santosh Chunchunguppe Shivashankar	India	Hero 450 Rally	Hero Motosports Team Rally
51	Patricio Cabrera	Chile	KTM Rally Replica	Kawasaki Chile Cidef
52	Petr Vlček	Czech Republic	Husqvarna 450	Petr Vlček
53	Antonio Maio	Portugal	Yamaha 450	Yamaha Fino Motor Racing
54	Mirjam Pol	Netherlands	Husqvarna FR 450 Rally	Ht Rally Raid Husqvarna Racing
55	Patrice Carillon	France	KTM 450 Rallye	Carillon
56	Rodney Faggotter	Australia	Yamaha WR450F	Yamaha Motor Australia
57	Philippe Cavelius	France	KTM Rally 450	Cavelius Team
58	Sebastian Cavallero	Peru	KTM 450 Rally	Rides 4 Hope
59	Skyler Howes	USA	Husqvarna FR 450 Rally	Klymciw Racing
60	Zhang Min	China	KTM Rally Replica 450	Wu Pu Da Hai Dao Dakar Rally Team
61	Anthony Boursaud	France	Yamaha 450 Rally	Antho Moto Sport - Drag'on Rally Team
63	Ben Young	Australia	KTM Rally Replica	Duust Rally Team
64	Carlo Vellutino	Peru	KTM 450	Xraids Team
65	Guillaume Chollet	France	Yamaha 450	Drag'on Rally Team
66	Abdullah Al Shatti	Kuwait	KTM 450 Rally Replica	Duust Rally Team
68	Jan Veselý	Czech Republic	Husqvarna FE 450	Ivar Cs Team
69	Florent Vayssade	France	KTM 450 Rallye	Team Vayssade Florent
70	Mishal Alghuneim	Saudi Arabia	KTM 450 Rally	Mishal Alghuneim
71	Krzysztof Jarmuż	Poland	KTM Rally	115moto
72	Philippe Gendron	France	KTM 450 Rally Repliqua	Nomade Racing
73	Cesar Pardo	Peru	KTM	KTM Peru Rally Team 2018
74	Jaume Betriu	Spain	KTM FR 450 Rally Motor	FN Speed Team
75	Willy Jobard	France	Bosuer 450 Dkr Rally	Guadalpin Banus / Bosuer Racing
76	Martin Freinademetz	Austria	KTM 450 Rally Replica	Red Bull Romaniacs
77	Jerome Denibaud	France	Husqvarna 450 Fr Rally	Team Jog - Original
78	Olivier Pain	France	KTM 450 Rally	Team Jog - Nomade Racing
79	Guillaume Simonnet	France	KTM 450 Rally Replica	Team Jog - Original
80	Marcel Butuza	Romania	KTM Rally Replica	Vectra Racing Team
81	Josep Maria Mas Arcos	Spain	Husqvarna WR 450F	Pedrega Team
82	Francisco Arredondo	Argentina	KTM 450 Rally Replica 2019	Duust Rally Team
83	Harith Noah Koitha Veettil	India	Sherco TVS	Sherco TVS Rally Factory
84	Zhao Hongyi	China	KTM 450 Rally	Wu Pu Da Hai Dao Dakar Rally Team
85	Charlie Herbst	France	KTM 450 Rally	Nomade Racing
86	Julian Jose Garcia Merino	Spain	Yamaha WR 450	Merino Team
87	Rachid Al-Lal Lahadil	Spain	KTM Rally Replica	Ciudad Autónoma De Melilla Rachid Rally
88	Javier Alvarez Fernandez	Spain	KTM 450 Rally	Team Tierrastur
89	Francesco Catanese	Italy	Yamaha 450	Tmf Racing Asd
90	Michael Extance	United Kingdom	KTM 450EXCF	Mick Extance
91	Enrique Guzman	Chile	KTM 450 Rally Replica	Xraids Team
93	Guillaume Martens	Netherlands	KTM 450 RR	Macad Rally Team
94	Oswaldo Burga	Peru	KTM Rally 450	Lalo Burga
95	Sebastien Lagut	France	KTM 450 Rally Replica	Nomade Racing
97	Simon Marčič	Slovenia	KTM EXC 450	Simon Marčič
98	Sara Garcia	Spain	Yamaha WRF450	Pont Grup Yamaha
99	Javier Vega Puerta	Spain	Yamaha Wr450	Pont Grup Yamaha
100	Stuart Gregory	South Africa	KTM 450 Rally Replica	Stuart Gregory
102	Neil Hawker	United Kingdom	Husqvarna 450 RRally	Neil Hawker
103	Gabor Saghmeister	Serbia	KTM 450 Rally Replica	Saghmeister Team
104	Kyle Mc Coy	USA	KTM 450 Rally Factory Replica	Bas Dakar KTM Racing Team
105	Daniel Albero Puig	Spain	Husqvarna 450 FE Rally	Team Un Diabetico En El Dakar
106	Alessandro Barbero	Italy	KTM KTC 450 SXE	Alessandro Barbero
107	Lionel Costes	France	KTM 450	Nomade Racing
108	Ignacio Sanchis	Spain	KTM 450 Replica Rally	FN Speed Team
109	Mirko Pavan	Italy	Beta	Nsm Racing Team
110	Alberto Bertoldi	Italy	KTM 450 Rally	BMS Moto
111	Cesare Zacchetti	Italy	KTM 450 Rally	Cesare Zacchetti
113	Sebastian Alberto Urquia	Argentina	KTM 450 Rally	X Raids PJM General Deheza
114	Craig Keyworth	United Kingdom	Husqvarna 450 Factory Rally	Adventure-Tech
115	Olaf Harmsen	Netherlands	KTM 450 Rally Replica	Bas Dakar KTM Racing Team
116	Carl Johan Bjerkert	Sweden	Husqvarna FR 450 Rally	Ht Rally Raid Husqvarna Racing
117	Kirsten Landman	South Africa	KTM 450 Rally Replica	Bas Dakar KTM Racing Team
118	Alexandre Bispo	France	Yamaha WRF Rallye	Expresso Racing
119	Fabio Fasola	Italy	Husqvarna	Fasola
120	Taye Perry	South Africa	KTM 450 Rally Replica	Nomade Racing
122	Alejandro Aros	Chile	KTM 450 Rally Replica	Xraids Team
123	Wessel Bosman	South Africa	KTM 450 Rally Replica	Race-2-dakar
124	Martien Jimmink	Netherlands	Husqvarna FR 450 RR	Ht Rally Raid Husqvarna Racing
125	Frederic Barlerin	France	KTM EXC	Rallye Fred
126	Simon Hewitt	United Kingdom	Yamaha WR450F	Crazy Camel Motorsport
127	Sebastien Cojean	France	Husqvarna 450 Rally Factory Förch	Seb Cojean
128	Giordano Pacheco	Colombia	KTM 450 Replica	Calidoso Racing Team
129	Antonio Lincoln Berrocal	Brazil	KTM Rally	Team Pro Tork
130	Myunggul Ryu	South Korea	Husqvarna HQV FR450 Rally	Klymciw Racing
131	David Chávez	Peru	KTM EXC-F 450	Club Aventura Touareg
132	Martin Michek	Czech Republic	KTM 450	Moto Racing Group (mrg)
133	Dmitry Agoshkov	Russia	KTM 450 Rally	Troykateam
134	Zaker Yakp	China	KTM 450 Rally	Wu Pu Da Hai Dao Dakar Rally Team
135	Leonardo Cola	Argentina	KTM 450 Rally Replica	Little Bigger
136	Bruno Bony	France	KTM 450 Rally	Team Casteu
137	Fabrice Lardon	France	KTM	Team Casteu
138	Romain Leloup	France	KTM Wolfie	Team Repar'stores
139	Pierre Louis Le Bonniec	France	KTM 450 Rallye Factory Replica	Nomade Racing
142	Graeme Sharp	Zimbabwe	KTM 450 Rally Factory Replica	Bas Dakar KTM Racing Team
143	Matthew Tisdall	Australia	KTM 450 Rally	Bas Dakar KTM Racing Team
144	Roman Krejčí	Czech Republic	KTM 450 Rally	Ivar Cs Team
145	Blas Zapag Hijo Zapag Peralta	Paraguay	KTM 450 Replica	M.e.d. Racing Team
146	Gerben Lieverdink	Netherlands	KTM 450 Rally Replica	Bas Dakar KTM Racing Team
147	David Mabbs	United Kingdom	KTM Rally	Vendettaracinguae.com
148	David McBride	United Kingdom	KTM 450 Ralley	Vendettaracinguae.com
149	Ismael Nietto	Chile	Speedbrain 450 Factory	Ismael Nietto
150	Salman Mohamed Humood Farhan Farhan	Bahrain	Husqvarna FR 450 Rally	Ht Rally Raid Husqvarna Racing
151	Eric Martinez	France	KTM/Husquvarna Rallye Replica	Eric Martinez
152	Phillip Wilson	Australia	KTM Rally Replica 450	Bas Dakar KTM Racing Team
153	Philip Turner	United Kingdom	KTM 450 Rally Factory Replica	Bas Dakar KTM Racing Team
154	Eduardo Iglesias Sanchez	Spain	KTM Rally	Eduardo Iglesias Sanchez
155	Matteo Olivetto	Italy	KTM 450 EXC 2019	Abc Old Farm Racing
158	Trevor Colin Wilson	Australia	Husqvarna FR 450 Rally	Trevor Wilson

=== Quads ===
Entry list — Quads

Note
The "Dakar Legends" - competitors that participated in 10 or more Dakar events - are marked in yellow.
The first time starters - "rookies" - are marked in blue.

No.	Driver	Country	Vehicle	Team
250	Ignacio Casale	Chile	Yamaha Raptor 700 Hemi	Casale Racing
251	Rafał Sonik	Poland	Yamaha Raptor 700 Hemi	Sonik Team
252	Alexandre Giroud	France	Yamaha YFZ 700 Hemi	Team Giroud
254	Nelson Sanabria Galeano	Paraguay	Yamaha Raptor 700 Hemi	M.E.D. Racing Team
255	Manuel Andújar	Argentina	Yamaha Raptor 700 Hemi	7240 Team
257	Kamil Wiśniewski	Poland	Yamaha Raptor 700 Hemi	Orlen Team
258	Tomáš Kubiena	Czech Republic	Ibos YFM 700 Raptor Hemi	Moto Racing Group (mrg)
259	Axel Dutrie	France	Yamaha Raptor 700 Hemi	Drag'on Rally Team
260	Carlos Alejandro Verza	Argentina	Yamaha 099 Renegade X XC 850 Hemi	Verza Rally Team
261	Martin Sarquiz	Argentina	Can-Am 800 R Hemi	Martin Sarquiz Team
262	Sebastien Souday	France	Yamaha 700YFMR Hemi	Team All Tracks
263	Zdeněk Tůma	Czech Republic	Yamaha Raptor Hemi	Barth Racing Team
265	Simon Vitse	France	Yamaha 700 Raptor Hemi	Je Peux 2020-bbr Mercier Racing
266	Leonardo Martínez	Bolivia	Can-Am Renegade Hemi	Team Can Am Martinez
267	Giovanni Enrico	Chile	Yamaha Raptor 700 Hemi	Enrico Racing Team
268	Italo Pedemonte	Chile	Yamaha Raptor 700 Hemi	Enrico Racing Team
271	Nicolas Robledo Serna	Colombia	Can-Am 2018 Hemi	Mazzucco Can-Am Team
272	Mariano Bennazar	Argentina	Yamaha Raptor Hemi	Bennazar Quad Team
273	Romain Dutu	France	Yamaha 700 Raptor Hemi	Smx Racing
274	Toni Vingut	Spain	Yamaha Raptor 700 Hemi	Visit Sant Antoni - Ibiza
275	Abdulmajed Aakhulaifi	Saudi Arabia	Yamaha 2019 Hemi	Race World Team
277	Arkadiusz Lindner	Poland	Can-Am Renegade Hemi	Lindner 91 Team
278	Paweł Otwinowski	Poland	Yamaha Raptor Hemi	Duust Rally Team

=== Cars ===
Entry list — Cars

Note
The "Dakar Legends" - competitors that participated in 10 or more Dakar events - are marked in yellow.
The first time starters - "rookies" - are marked in blue.
Competitors that were not able to start the race.

No.	Driver	Country	Co-driver	Country	Vehicle	Team	Class
300	Nasser Al-Attiyah	Qatar	Matthieu Baumel	France	Toyota Hilux	Toyota Gazoo Racing	T1.1
301	Nani Roma	Spain	Daniel Oliveras Carreras	Spain	Borgward BX7 Evo	Borgward Rally Team	T1.1
302	Stéphane Peterhansel	France	Paulo Fiúza	Portugal	Mini John Cooper Works Buggy	Bahrain JCW X-Raid Team	T1.4
303	Jakub Przygoński	Poland	Timo Gottschalk	Germany	Mini John Cooper Works Rally	Orlen X-Raid Team	T1.2
304	Giniel De Villiers	South Africa	Alex Haro Bravo	Spain	Toyota Hilux	Toyota Gazoo Racing	T1.1
305	Carlos Sainz	Spain	Lucas Cruz	Spain	Mini John Cooper Works Buggy	Bahrain JCW X-Raid Team	T1.4
306	Martin Prokop	Czech Republic	Viktor Chytka	Czech Republic	Ford Raptor RS Cross Country	MP-Sports	T1.1
307	Bernhard ten Brinke	Netherlands	Tom Colsoul	Belgium	Toyota Hilux	Toyota Gazoo Racing	T1.1
308	Sheikh Khalid Al Qassimi	United Arab Emirates	Xavier Panseri	France	Peugeot 3008 DKR	PH-Sport	T1.4
309	Yazeed Al Rajhi	Saudi Arabia	Konstantin Zhiltsov	Russia	Toyota Hilux	Overdrive Toyota	T1.1
310	Fernando Alonso	Spain	Marc Coma	Spain	Toyota Hilux	Toyota Gazoo Racing	T1.1
311	Orlando Terranova	Argentina	Bernardo Graue	Argentina	Mini John Cooper Works Rally	X-Raid Mini JCW Team	T1.2
312	Benediktas Vanagas	Lithuania	Filipe Palmeiro	Portugal	Toyota Hilux	Inbank Team Pitlane	T1.1
314	Erik Van Loon	Netherlands	Sebastien Delaunay	France	Toyota Hilux Overdrive	Overdrive Toyota	T1.1
315	Mathieu Serradori	France	Fabian Lurquin	Belgium	Century Buggy	SRT Racing	T1.3
316	Peter Van Merksteijn	Netherlands	Michael Orr	United Kingdom	Toyota Hilux Overdrive	Overdrive Toyota	T1.1
317	Vladimir Vasilyev	Russia	Vitaliy Yevtyekhov	Ukraine	Mini John Cooper Works Rally	X-Raid G-Energy	T1.2
318	Antanas Juknevičius	Lithuania	Darius Vaičiulis	Lithuania	Toyota Overdrive Hilux 2016 IRS Model	VSI Dakaras LT	T1.1
319	Vaidotas Žala	Lithuania	Saulius Jurgelėnas	Lithuania	Mini All4 Racing	Agrorodeo	T1.2
320	Ronan Chabot	France	Gilles Pillot	France	Toyota Hilux Overdrive	Overdrive Toyota	T1.1
321	Dominique Housieaux	France	Pascal Delacour	France	MD Rallye Sport Optimus	MD Rallye Sport	T1.3
322	Wei Han	China	Min Liao	China	Hanwei Motorsport 2wd	Geely Auto Shell Lubricant Team	T1.3
323	Denis Krotov	Russia	Dmytro Tsyro	Ukraine	Mini John Cooper Works Rally	MSK Rally Team	T1.2
324	Yasir Seaidan	Saudi Arabia	Alexy Kuzmich	Russia	Mini 2013	Race World Team	T1.2
325	Isidre Esteve Pujol	Spain	Txema Villalobos	Spain	BMW BV6	Repsol Rally Team / Sodicars Racing	T1.2
326	Christian Lavieille	France	Jean-Pierre Garcin	France	Toyota VDJ200	Toyota Auto Body	T2.2
327	Pascal Thomasse	France	Christophe Crespo	France	MD Rallye Sport Optimus	Keepower Motorsports MD	T1.3
328	Tomáš Ouředníček	Czech Republic	David Kripal	Czech Republic	Ford Ranger	Ultimate Dakar	T2.2
329	Romain Dumas	France	Alexandre Winocq	France	RD Limited DXX	RD Limited	T1.3
330	Pierre Lachaume	France	Jean Michel Polato	France	Peugeot 2008 DKR	PH-Sport	T1.4
331	Miroslav Zapletal	Czech Republic	Marek Sýkora	Slovakia	Ford F150 Evo	Offroadsport	T1.1
332	Ricardo Porem	Portugal	Manuel Porem	Portugal	Borgward BX7 Evo	Borgward Rally Team	T1.1
333	Remy Vauthier	Switzerland	Gerard Dubuy	France	MD Rallye Sport Optimus	MD Rallye Sport	T1.3
334	Jesus Calleja	Spain	Jaume Aregall	Spain	Toyota Hilux Overdrive	Overdrive Toyota	T1.1
335	Jerôme Pelichet	France	Pascal Larroque	France	MD Rallye Sport Optimus	Raidlynx	T1.3
336	Cristina Gutiérrez Herrero	Spain	Pablo Moreno Huete	Spain	Mitsubishi Eclipse Cross	Mitsubishi / Sodicars Racing	T1.2
337	Jean Pierre Strugo	France	Francois Borsotto	France	MD Rallye Sport Optimus	MD Rallye Sport	T1.3
338	Akira Miura	Japan	Laurent Lichtleuchter	France	Toyota VDJ200	Toyota Auto Body	T2.2
340	Aidong Li	China	Zhaoyang Shen	China	Chevrolet	Qian’an Jiu Jiang Landsail Racing Club	T1.1
341	Oscar Fuertes Aldanondo	Spain	Diego Vallejo	Spain	Ssangyong Korando DKR	Ssangyong Motosport / Sodicars Racing	T1.3
342	Thomas Bell	United Kingdom	Patrick McMurren	United Kingdom	Nissan Navara	Sabertooth Motoring Adventure	T1.1
343	Boris Vaculík	Czech Republic	Martin Plechaty	Czech Republic	Ford F150 Evo	3rcz.com	T1.1
344	Bobby Patton	USA	Robby Pierce	USA	Toyota Hilux Overdrive	Overdrive Toyota	T1.1
345	Xavier Foj	Spain	Ignacio Santamaria	Spain	Toyota Land Cruiser	Foj Motorsport	T1.2
346	Gerard Tramoni	France	Dominique Totain	France	Land Rover Discovery	Team 100% Sud Ouest	T1.1
347	Tim Coronel	Netherlands	Tom Coronel	Netherlands	Jefferies Dakar Rally "The Beast 3.0"	Maxxis Dakar Team Powered By Eurol	T1.5
348	Blas Zapag	Paraguay	Juan Jose Sanchez	Paraguay	Volkswagen Amarok	South Racing	T1.1
349	Jerome Renaud	France	Max Delfino	France	Rover Nemesis R	Team Ssp	T1.1
350	Jean Remy Bergounhe	France	Jean Brucy	France	Buggy LCR30	SRT Racing	T1.3
351	Alexandre Pesci	Switzerland	Stephan Kuhni	Switzerland	Rebellion DXX	RD Limited	T1.3
352	Andrey Cherednikov	Kazakhstan	Ignat Falkov	Kazakhstan	Ford F150 Evo	Offroad Kazakhstan	T1.1
353	Juan Carlos Vallejo	Chile	Leonardo Baronio	Peru	Volkswagen Amarok	Team Proraid Peru	T1.2
354	Hennie De Klerk	South Africa	Johann Wilhelm Smalberger	South Africa	Nissan Navara	Treasuryone	T1.1
355	Aleksandr Dorossinskij	Russia	Oleg Uperenko	Latvia	Mini All4 Racing	X-Raid Mini JCW Team	T1.2
356	Markus Walcher	Germany	Tobias Henschel	Germany	QT Bowler Wildcat	Enduro XXX	T1.1
357	Frederic Tuheil	France	Pierre Tuheil	France	Toyota Rav V8	Team 100% Sud Ouest	T1.1
358	Philippe Boutron	France	Mayeul Barbet	France	Sodicars BV2	Sodicars Racing	T1.3
359	Maik Willems	Netherlands	Robert Van Pelt	Netherlands	Toyota Overdrive	Bastion Hotels Dakar Team	T1.1
360	Roman Starikovich	Cyprus	Bert Heskes	Netherlands	Toyota Hilux Overdrive	Autolife	T1.1
361	Mohamad Altwijri	Saudi Arabia	Khalid Almarshood	Saudi Arabia	Toyota Land Cruiser	Altuwaijri Racing Team	T1.1
362	Jianyun Jin	China	Wenke Ma	China	MD Rallye Sport Optimus	Keepower Motorsports MD	T1.3
363	Quan Ruan	China	Yirong Wang	China	Chevrolet	Qian’an Jiu Jiang Landsail Racing Club	T1.1
364	Manuel Plaza Perez	Spain	Monica Plaza	Spain	Sodicars BV2	Sodicars Racing	T1.3
365	Fernanda Kanno	Peru	Alonso Carrillo	Peru	Toyota Land Cruiser	De 0 Al Dakar	T1.1
367	Andrea Schiumarini	Italy	Enrico Gaspari	Italy	Mitsubishi Pajero WRC Plus	R Team	T1.2
368	Gintas Petrus	Lithuania	Tomas Jančys	Lithuania	Toyota Hilux	Petrus Racing	T1.1
369	Teun Stam	Netherlands	Rene Bargeman	Netherlands	Toyota Rally Cruiser	Schijf Rally	T1.2
371	Francois Cousin	France	Stephane Cousin	France	Nissan No3	Compagnie Des Dunes	T1.1
372	Sebastián Guayasamín	Ecuador	Mauro Esteban Lipez	Argentina	Chevrolet BV8	Sodicars Racing	T1.1
373	Yuqiao Zhao	China	Ke Yan	China	Chevrolet	Qian’an Jiu Jiang Landsail Racing Club	T1.1
374	Abdulaziz Alyaeesh	Saudi Arabia	Faisal Mohammed Ftyh	Saudi Arabia	Isuzu D-Max	Naizk	T2.2
376	Thierry Richard	France	Franck Maldonado	France	Nissan Springbok	Sodicars Racing	T1.1
377	Joan Font	Spain	Borja Rodriguez	Spain	Toyota Land Cruiser	FN Speed Team	TAS
379	Lei Zhong	China	Feng Chen	China	Chevrolet BV2	Soaring Dragon / Sodicars Racing	T1.3
381	Juan Manuel Maña	Spain	Jose Calvar	Spain	Toyota Land Cruiser KDJ 120	Automode	T.2C
382	Edvinas Juškauskas	Lithuania	Aisvydas Paliukėnas	Lithuania	Toyota Hilux	Heston MRO Team Pitlane	T1.1
383	Salman Alshummari	Saudi Arabia	Saud Nasser Altamimi	Saudi Arabia	Nissan Patrol	Salman Al Shummari Team	T2.1
385	Yves Tartarin	France	Patrick Lepers	France	Land Rover Nemesis R	RD Limited	T1.2
386	Marco Piana	France	William Alcaraz	France	Toyota KDJ 125	Xtremeplus Polaris Factory Team	TAS
387	Philippe Raud	France	Patrice Saint Marc	France	Toyota Land Cruiser	Sodicars Racing	T1.2
389	Pablo Canto Martínez	Spain	Facundo Jaton	Argentina	Toyota Hilux	Fusiona	T1.2
390	Jordi Queralto	Spain	Petra Zemánková	Czech Republic	Jeep Rubicon	Krestex Team	OP.1
392	Marco Carrara	Italy	Maurizio Dominella	Italy	Mitsubishi Pajero WRC Plus	R Team	T1.2

=== UTVs ===
Entry list — UTVs

Note
The "Dakar Legends" - competitors that participated in 10 or more Dakar events - are marked in yellow.
The first time starters - "rookies" - are marked in blue.

No.	Driver	Country	Co-driver	Country	Vehicle	Team
400	Francisco "Chaleco" López Contardo	Chile	Juan Pablo Latrach Vinagre	Chile	Can-Am Maverick	South Racing Can-Am
401	Gerard Farrés Güell	Spain	Armand Monleon	Spain	Can-Am Maverick	Monster Energy Can-Am
402	Reinaldo Varela	Brazil	Gustavo Gugelmin	Brazil	Can-Am Maveric X3	Monster Energy Can-Am
403	Cyril Despres	France	Michael Horn	Switzerland	OT3 buggy	Red Bull Off-Road Team USA
404	Conrad Rautenbach	Zimbabwe	Pedro Bianchi Prata	Portugal	PH-Sport Zephyr	PH-Sport
405	Casey Currie	USA	Sean Berriman	USA	Can-Am Maverick	Monster Energy Can-Am
406	Jose Luis Pena Campo	Spain	Rafael Tornabell Cordoba	Spain	Polaris RZR 1000 Turbo	Xtremeplus Polaris Factory Team
407	Denis Berezovskiy	Kazakhstan	Ricardo Adrian Torlaschi	Argentina	Can-Am Maverick X3	Forestal Team
409	Blade Hildebrand	USA	Francois Cazalet	France	OT3 buggy	Red Bull Off-Road Team USA
410	José Antonio Hinojo López	Spain	Diego Ortega Gil	Spain	Can-Am Maverick X3	Hibor Raid
411	Sergey Karyakin	Russia	Anton Vlasiuk	Russia	BRP Maverick X3	Snag Racing Team
412	Mitchell Guthrie	USA	Ola Fløene	Norway	OT3 buggy	Red Bull Off-Road Team USA
414	Josef Macháček	Czech Republic	Vlastimil Tošenovský	Czech Republic	Can-Am Maverick X RS Turbo R	Buggyra Racing
415	Ruben Gracia	Spain	Sergio Peinado Jimenez	Spain	Extreme GPR20	GPR Sport
417	Axel Alletru	France	Francois Beguin	Belgium	Can-Am X3	# Je Peux 2020-BBR Mercier Racing
418	Graham Knight	United Kingdom	David Watson	United Kingdom	Polaris RZR 1000 Turbo	Xtremeplus Polaris Factory Team
419	Aron Domżała	Poland	Maciej Marton	Poland	Can-Am Maverick X3	Domzala
420	Jesus Puras	Spain	Xavier Blanco	Spain	Can-Am Maverick X3	Xraids & Buggymaster Team
421	Camelia Liparoti	Italy	Annett Fischer	Germany	Yamaha YXZ 1000R	C.A.T. Racing Yamaha
423	Omar Eliseo Gandara	Argentina	Sergio Lafuente	Uruguay	Can-Am Maverick X3	Omar Gandara Dakar Team
424	Eric Abel	France	Christian Manez	France	Polaris RZR 1000 Turbo	Xtremeplus Polaris Factory Team
425	Maciej Domżała	Poland	Rafał Marton	Poland	Can-Am Macerick X3	Domzala
426	Patrick Sireyjol	France	Jean Luc Martin	France	Can-Am	Team BTR
427	Austin Jones	USA	Kellon Walch	USA	Can-Am Maverick	South Racing Can-Am
428	Herve Diers	France	Alain Brousse	France	Can-Am X3	# Je Peux 2020-BBR Mercier Racing
429	Kees Koolen	Netherlands	Jurgen Van Den Goorbergh	Netherlands	Can-Am Maverick X3	MEC Team
430	Roberto Carranza	Spain	Juan Carlos Fernandez	Spain	Extreme GPR20	GPR Sport
431	Juan Miguel Fidel Medero	Spain	Juan Silva	Argentina	Can-Am X3	FN Speed Team
432	Fabio Del Punta	Italy	Giacomo Tognarini	Italy	Can-Am Maverick	R Team
433	Santiago Navarro	Spain	Marc Solà Terradellas	Spain	Can-Am X3	FN Speed Team
434	Vincent Gonzalez	Switzerland	Stephane Duple	France	Can-Am Maverick X-RS	El Blanco Rosso Racing Team
437	Antonio Marmolejo	Colombia	Eduardo Blanco	Spain	Can-Am Maverick	South Racing Can-Am
438	Miguel Ardid Viturro	Spain	Pedro Lopez Chaves	Spain	Can-Am Maverick X3	Xraids & Buggymaster Team
439	Jeremy Croizon	France	Gregory Croizon	France	Suzuki 1000 GSXR	MD Rallye Sport
440	Hugues Lapouille	France	Eric Croquelois	France	Can-Am X3	# Je Peux 2020-BBR Mercier Racing
441	Frederic Pitout	France	Renaud Niveau	France	Can-Am DFDSF	Team BTR
442	Saleh Alsaif	Saudi Arabia	Moad Alarja	Jordan	Can-Am X3 RRS	Asasi
443	Aleksei Shmotev	Russia	Andrei Rudnitski	Belarus	Can-Am Maverick X3 X RS	Snag Racing Team
444	Ilya Rouss	Russia	Anton Yarashuk	Belarus	Can-Am Maverick X3	Forestal Team
445	Pedro Burgo Vilanova	Spain	Marcos Burgo Vilanova	Spain	Can-Am Maverick X3	Galimplant Team
446	Stefano Marrini	Italy	Nicolas Garcia	Argentina	Yamaha YXZ 1000R	Stefano Marrini
447	Michele Cinotto	Italy	Marco Arnoletti	Italy	X3	FN Speed Team
448	Cedric Lemaire	France	Dominique Marcant	France	Can-Am X3	# Je Peux 2020-BBR Mercier Racing
450	Domingo Roman Pardos	Spain	Eduardo Izquierdo Rodriguez	Spain	Extreme GPR20	GPR Sport
451	Talal El Badr	Saudi Arabia	Ali Mirza	United Arab Emirates	Can-Am Lc200	TB Motorsports
473	Elvis Borsoi	Italy	Stefano Pelloni	Italy	Can-Am Maverick X3 XRS	RT73

=== Trucks ===
Entry list — Trucks

Note
The "Dakar Legends" - competitors that participated in 10 or more Dakar events - are marked in yellow.
The first time starters - "rookies" - are marked in blue.

No.	Driver	Country	Co-driver	Country	Technician	Country	Vehicle	Team
500	Eduard Nikolaev	Russia	Evgenii Iakovlev	Russia	Vladimir Rybakov	Russia	Kamaz 43509	Kamaz Master
501	Dmitry Sotnikov	Russia	Ruslan Akhmadeev	Russia	Ilgiz Akhmetzianov	Russia	Kamaz 43509	Kamaz Master
502	Aleš Loprais	Czech Republic	Petr Pokora	Czech Republic	Khalid Alkendi	United Arab Emirates	Tatra Jamal - Queen 69	Instaforex Loprais Team
503	Siarhei Viazovich	Belarus	Pavel Haranin	Belarus	Anton Zaparoshchanka	Belarus	MAZ 6440RR	MAZ-Sportauto
504	Martin Macik	Czech Republic	František Tomášek	Czech Republic	David Švanda	Czech Republic	Iveco PowerStar	Big Shock Racing
505	Janus van Kasteren	Netherlands	Darek Rodewald	Poland	Marcel Snijders	Netherlands	Iveco PowerStar	Petronas Team De Rooy Iveco
506	Martin van den Brink	Netherlands	Wouter De Graaff	Netherlands	Mitchel Van Den Brink	Netherlands	Renault Trucks K520	Mammoet Rallysport
507	Gert Huzink	Netherlands	Rob Buursen	Netherlands	Martin Roesink	Netherlands	Renault C460 Hybrid Edition	Riwald Dakar Team
508	Aleksandr Vasilevski	Belarus	Dzmitry Vikhrenka	Belarus	Vitali Murylev	Belarus	MAZ 5309RR	MAZ-Sportauto
509	Martin Šoltys	Czech Republic	Tomáš Šikola	Czech Republic	David Schovánek	Czech Republic	Tatra Phoenix	Tatra Buggyra Racing
510	Robert Szustkowski	Poland	Jarosław Kazberuk	Poland	Filip Skrobanek	Czech Republic	Tatra Jamal	Fesh Fesh / R-sixteam
511	Andrey Karginov	Russia	Andrey Mokeev	Russia	Igor Leonov	Russia	Kamaz 43509	Kamaz Master
512	Teruhito Sugawara	Japan	Yuji Mochizuki	Japan	Hirokazu Somemiya	Japan	Hino 500	Hino Team Sugawara
514	Pascal De Baar	Netherlands	Jan Van Der Vaet	Belgium	Stefan Slootjes	Netherlands	Renault K520	Riwald Dakar Team
515	Mathias Behringer	Germany	Stefan Henken	Germany	Bruno Sousa	Portugal	MAN SX	South Racing
516	Anton Shibalov	Russia	Dmitrii Nikitin	Russia	Ivan Tatarinov	Russia	Kamaz 43509	Kamaz Master
517	Albert Llovera	Andorra	Ferran Marco Alcayna	Spain	Marc Torres	Spain	Iveco PowerStar	Petronas Team De Rooy Iveco
518	Claudio Bellina	Italy	Giulio Minelli	Italy	Bruno Gotti	Italy	DAF X2223	Italtrans
519	Ikuo Hanawa	Japan	Yudai Hanawa	Japan	Mayumi Kezuka	Japan	Hino 600	Hino Team Sugawara
521	Patrice Garrouste	France	Szymon Gospodarczyk	Poland	Petr Vojkovský	Czech Republic	Tatra Jamal	Fesh Fesh / R-sixteam
522	Victor Willem Corne Versteijnen	Netherlands	Andreas Wilhelmus Michiel Marius Van Der Sande	Netherlands	Teun Van Dal	Netherlands	Iveco PowerStar	Petronas Team De Rooy Iveco
523	Jordi Juvanteny	Spain	Jose Luis Criado	Spain	Xavier Domenech	Spain	MAN TGA 26.480	Epsilon
524	Richard De Groot	Netherlands	Van Den Elshout Raph	Netherlands	Hulsebosch Jan	Netherlands	Renault K-520	Firemen Dakar Team
525	Gerrit Zuurmond	Netherlands	Jasper Riezebos	Netherlands	Klaas Kwakkel	Netherlands	MAN H51	Rainbow Truck Team
526	Paolo Calabria	Italy	Loris Calubini	Italy	Giuseppe Fortuna	Italy	MAN AG 4x4	Orobica Raid
527	Jan Van De Laar	Netherlands	Ben Van De Laar	Netherlands	Simon Stubbs	United Kingdom	DAF FAV 85	Fried Van De Laar Racing
528	Aliaksei Vishneuski	Belarus	Maksim Novikau	Belarus	Andrei Neviarovich	Belarus	MAZ 5309RR	MAZ-Sportauto
529	Alberto Herrero	Spain	Julio Romero Lorenzo	Spain	Matthias Vetiska	Austria	MAN TGS 18.480 4x4BB	TH-Trucks
530	Ed Wigman	Netherlands	Joel Ebbers	Netherlands	Hendrik Elisabert Schatorie	Netherlands	MAN H51	Riwald Dakar Team
531	Michiel Becx	Netherlands	Bernard Der Kinderen	Netherlands	Edwin Kuijpers	Netherlands	Iveco Trakker	Petronas Team De Rooy Iveco
532	Turki Mohammed Al Sudairy	Saudi Arabia	Samir Benbekhti	Algeria	Sofiane Megueni	Algeria	MAN TGS	Al Sudairy
533	William De Groot	Netherlands	Edwin Van De Langenberg	Netherlands	Lambertus Gloudemans	Netherlands	DAF FT XF105	Team De Groot
534	Almuhna Ibrahm	Saudi Arabia	Osama Alsanad	Saudi Arabia	Raed Abo Theeb	Saudi Arabia	Unimog U500	Ibrahim Almuhna
535	Robert Randýsek	Czech Republic	Geoffrey Thalgott	France	Erick Gilbert	France	MAN TGA	PH-Sport
536	Antonio Cabini	Italy	Giulio Verzeletti	Italy	Carlo Cabini	Italy	Mercedes Unimog 400	Orobica Raid
537	Frances Ester Fernandez	Spain	Jean-Francois Cazeres	France	Jose Martins	Portugal	Iveco	Team Boucou
539	Rafael Tibau Maynou	Spain	Ramon Maria Invernon Bardia	Spain	Philipp Beier	Germany	MAN TGA26.480 6x6 BB	TH-Trucks
540	Cesare Gianfranco Rickler Del Mare	Italy	Dragos Razvan Buran	Romania	-	-	Iveco EuroCargo	R Team
541	Jordi Esteve Oro	Spain	Enric Marti Flix	Spain	Yue Ning	China	Mercedes	Jjspor/TH-Trucks
543	Richard Gonzalez	France	Jean-Philippe Salviat	France	Jean-Pierre Normand Courivaud	France	DAF TSB	Sodicars Racing
545	Tariq Alrammah	Saudi Arabia	Denis Martin	France	Eric Baudoin	France	Renault Kerax	STA Competition
546	Jordi Ginesta	Andorra	Marc Dardaillon	France	Armando Loureiro	Portugal	MAN TGA	Team Boucou
547	Sylvain Besnard	France	Antoine Vitse	France	Sylvain Laliche	France	MAN TGA114	Team SSP
548	Dave Ingels	Belgium	Jean Bernard Cassoulet	France	Johannes Schotanus	Netherlands	DAF 75CF	Team Boucou
549	Ahmed Benbekhti	Algeria	Ramzi Osmani	Algeria	Bruno Seillet	France	MAN TGA	Sodicars Racing
550	Dave Berghmans	Belgium	Tom Geuens	Belgium	Luca Lorenzato	Italy	Iveco Trakker	Overdrive Toyota

== Stages ==
Stage 8 was cancelled for motorbikes and quads, following the death of Paulo Gonçalves on stage 7.

Date	Stage	Start	Finish	Length: Liaison / Special	Bikes (winner)	Quads (winner)	Cars (winner)	UTV (winner)	Trucks (winner)
5 January 2020	Stage 1	(Saudi Arabia) Jeddah	(Saudi Arabia) Al Wajh	433 km (269 mi) / 319 km (198 mi)	(Australia) Price	(Chile) Casale	(Lithuania) Zala	(Poland) Domzala	(Russia) Anton Shibalov
6 January 2020	Stage 2	(Saudi Arabia) Al Wajh	(Saudi Arabia) Neom	26 km (16 mi) / 367 km (228 mi)	(Botswana) Branch	(Chile) Casale	(South Africa) De Villiers	(Chile) López Contardo	(Belarus) Siarhei Viazovich
7 January 2020	Stage 3	(Saudi Arabia) Neom	(Saudi Arabia) Neom	77 km (48 mi) / 427 km (265 mi)	(United States) Brabec	(Chile) Enrico	(Spain) Sainz	(Spain) Farrés Güell	(Russia) Karginov
8 January 2020	Stage 4	(Saudi Arabia) Neom	(Saudi Arabia) Al-'Ula	219 km (136 mi) / 453 km (281 mi)	(Chile) Cornejo Florimo	(Chile) Casale	(France) Peterhansel	(United States) Mitch Guthrie	(Russia) Shibalov
9 January 2020	Stage 5	(Saudi Arabia) Al-'Ula	(Saudi Arabia) Ha'il	211 km (131 mi) / 353 km (219 mi)	(Australia) Price	(France) Dutu	(Spain) Sainz	(France) Despres	(Russia) Sotnikov
10 January 2020	Stage 6	(Saudi Arabia) Ha'il	(Saudi Arabia) Riyadh	353 km (219 mi) / 477 km (296 mi)	(United States) Brabec	(France) Vitse	(France) Peterhansel	(Spain) Farrés Güell	(Russia) Karginov
11 January 2020	Rest day	(Saudi Arabia) Riyadh		–	Rest day				
12 January 2020	Stage 7	(Saudi Arabia) Riyadh	(Saudi Arabia) Wadi ad-Dawasir	195 km (121 mi) / 546 km (339 mi)	(Argentina) Kevin Benavides	(France) Vitse	(Spain) Sainz	(United States) Hildebrand	(Russia) Karginov
13 January 2020	Stage 8	(Saudi Arabia) Wadi ad-Dawasir	(Saudi Arabia) Wadi ad-Dawasir	239 km (149 mi) / 477 km (296 mi)	Cancelled		(France) Serradori	(Brazil) Varela	(Russia) Karginov
14 January 2020	Stage 9	(Saudi Arabia) Ad-Dawasir	(Saudi Arabia) Haradh	476 km (296 mi) / 410 km (250 mi)	(Chile) Pablo Quintanilla	(Chile) Ignacio Casale	(France) Peterhansel	(United States) Hildebrand	(Russia) Karginov
15 January 2020	Stage 10	(Saudi Arabia) Haradh	(Saudi Arabia) Shubaytah	74 km (46 mi) / 534 km (332 mi)	(Spain) Barreda Bort	(Poland) Wisniewski	(Spain) Sainz	(United States) Mitch Guthrie	(Russia) Shibalov
16 January 2020	Stage 11	(Saudi Arabia) Shubaytah	(Saudi Arabia) Haradh	365 km (227 mi) / 379 km (235 mi)	(Chile) Quintanilla	(Poland) Sonik	(France) Peterhansel	(Chile) López Contardo	(Russia) Karginov
17 January 2020	Stage 12	(Saudi Arabia) Haradh	(Saudi Arabia) Al-Qiddiya	73 km (45 mi) / 374 km (232 mi)	(Chile) Cornejo Florimo	(Poland) Arkadiusz Lindner	(Qatar) Al-Attiyah	(Brazil) Varela	(Russia) Karginov
Rally winners					(United States) Ricky Brabec	(Chile) Ignacio Casale	(Spain) Carlos Sainz	(United States) Casey Currie	(Russia) Andrey Karginov

== Stage results ==
=== Bikes ===
Stage 8 was canceled for motorbikes and quads following Paulo Gonçalves death.

	Stage result					General classification				
Stage	Pos	Competitor	Make	Time	Gap	Pos	Competitor	Make	Time	Gap
1	1	(Australia) Toby Price	KTM	03:21:33		1	(Australia) Toby Price	KTM	03:21:33	
1	2	(United States) Ricky Brabec	Honda	03:21:38	00:00:05	2	(United States) Ricky Brabec	Honda	03:21:38	00:00:05
1	3	(Austria) Matthias Walkner	KTM	03:22:13	00:00:40	3	(Austria) Matthias Walkner	KTM	03:22:13	00:00:40
2	1	(Botswana) Ross Branch	KTM	03:39:10		1	(United Kingdom) Sam Sunderland	KTM	07:05:22	
2	2	(United Kingdom) Sam Sunderland	KTM	03:40:34	00:01:24	2	(Chile) Pablo Quintanilla	Husqvarna	07:06:40	00:01:18
2	3	(Chile) Pablo Quintanilla	Husqvarna	03:41:31	00:02:21	3	(Argentina) Kevin Benavides	Honda	07:06:54	00:01:32
3	1	(United States) Ricky Brabec	Honda	03:29:31		1	(United States) Ricky Brabec	Honda	10:39:04	
3	2	(Chile) José Ignacio Cornejo Florimo	Honda	03:35:27	00:05:56	2	(Argentina) Kevin Benavides	Honda	10:43:47	00:04:43
3	3	(Argentina) Kevin Benavides	Honda	03:36:53	00:07:22	3	(Austria) Matthias Walkner	KTM	10:45:06	00:06:02
Due to a technical GPS problem the race stewards have decided to modify bikers Stage 3 results recorded at the finishing line of the special.
4	1	(Chile) José Ignacio Cornejo Florimo	Honda	04:24:51		1	(United States) Ricky Brabec	Honda	15:06:43	
4	2	(Argentina) Kevin Benavides	Honda	04:25:26	00:00:35	2	(Argentina) Kevin Benavides	Honda	15:09:13	00:02:30
4	3	(Botswana) Ross Branch	KTM	04:25:46	00:00:55	3	(Chile) José Ignacio Cornejo Florimo	Honda	15:15:14	00:08:31
5	1	(Australia) Toby Price	KTM	03:57:33		1	(United States) Ricky Brabec	Honda	19:07:19	
5	2	(Chile) Pablo Quintanilla	Husqvarna	03:58:45	00:01:12	2	(Australia) Toby Price	KTM	19:16:25	00:09:06
5	3	(United States) Andrew Short	Husqvarna	04:00:04	00:02:31	3	(Argentina) Kevin Benavides	Honda	19:18:51	00:11:32
6	1	(United States) Ricky Brabec	Honda	04:36:28		1	(United States) Ricky Brabec	Honda	23:43:47	
6	2	(Spain) Joan Barreda Bort	Honda	04:38:02	00:01:34	2	(Chile) Pablo Quintanilla	Husqvarna	24:04:43	00:20:56
6	3	(Austria) Matthias Walkner	KTM	04:39:13	00:02:45	3	(Australia) Toby Price	KTM	24:09:26	00:25:39
7	1	(Argentina) Kevin Benavides	Honda	04:36:22		1	(United States) Ricky Brabec	Honda	28:25:01	
7	2	(Spain) Joan Barreda Bort	Honda	04:37:45	00:01:23	2	(Chile) Pablo Quintanilla	Husqvarna	28:49:49	00:24:48
7	3	(Austria) Matthias Walkner	KTM	04:40:39	00:04:17	3	(Chile) José Ignacio Cornejo Florimo	Honda	28:52:02	00:27:01
8	Stage cancelled									
9	1	(Chile) Pablo Quintanilla	Husqvarna	03:30:33		1	(United States) Ricky Brabec	Honda	31:59:29	
9	2	(Australia) Toby Price	KTM	03:32:27	00:01:54	2	(Chile) Pablo Quintanilla	Husqvarna	32:20:22	00:20:53
9	3	(Spain) Joan Barreda Bort	Honda	03:33:15	00:02:42	3	(Australia) Toby Price	KTM	32:26:12	00:26:43
10	1	(Spain) Joan Barreda Bort	Honda	02:11:42		1	(United States) Ricky Brabec	Honda	34:12:18	
10	2	(United States) Ricky Brabec	Honda	02:12:49	00:01:07	2	(Chile) Pablo Quintanilla	Husqvarna	34:38:02	00:25:44
10	3	(Argentina) Kevin Benavides	Honda	02:14:13	00:02:31	3	(Spain) Joan Barreda Bort	Honda	34:39:27	00:27:09
11	1	(Chile) Pablo Quintanilla	Husqvarna	04:09:22		1	(United States) Ricky Brabec	Honda	38:33:28	
11	2	(Austria) Matthias Walkner	KTM	04:09:31	00:00:09	2	(Chile) Pablo Quintanilla	Husqvarna	38:47:24	00:13:56
11	3	(Argentina) Luciano Benavides	KTM	04:12:10	00:02:48	3	(Australia) Toby Price	KTM	38:56:02	00:22:34
12	1	(Chile) José Ignacio Cornejo Florimo	Honda	01:28:15		1	(United States) Ricky Brabec	Honda	40:02:36	
12	2	(United States) Ricky Brabec	Honda	01:29:08	00:00:53	2	(Chile) Pablo Quintanilla	Husqvarna	40:19:02	00:16:26
12	3	(Australia) Toby Price	KTM	01:30:40	00:02:25	3	(Australia) Toby Price	KTM	40:26:42	00:24:06

=== Quads ===
	Stage result					General classification				
Stage	Pos	Competitor	Make	Time	Gap	Pos	Competitor	Make	Time	Gap
1	1	(Chile) Ignacio Casale	Yamaha	04:17:37		1	(Chile) Ignacio Casale	Yamaha	04:17:37	
1	2	(Poland) Rafał Sonik	Yamaha	04:23:13	00:05:36	2	(Poland) Rafał Sonik	Yamaha	04:23:13	00:05:36
1	3	(Czech Republic) Tomáš Kubiena	Yamaha	04:24:32	00:06:55	3	(Czech Republic) Tomáš Kubiena	Yamaha	04:24:32	00:06:55
2	1	(Chile) Ignacio Casale	Yamaha	04:46:07		1	(Chile) Ignacio Casale	Yamaha	09:03:44	
2	2	(Poland) Rafał Sonik	Yamaha	04:49:40	00:03:33	2	(Poland) Rafał Sonik	Yamaha	09:12:53	00:09:09
2	3	(France) Simon Vitse	Yamaha	04:56:58	00:10:51	3	(Chile) Giovanni Enrico	Yamaha	09:26:52	00:23:08
3	1	(Chile) Giovanni Enrico	Yamaha	04:30:52		1	(Chile) Ignacio Casale	Yamaha	13:38:05	
3	2	(France) Simon Vitse	Yamaha	04:31:53	00:01:01	2	(Poland) Rafał Sonik	Yamaha	13:52:34	00:14:29
3	3	(Chile) Ignacio Casale	Yamaha	04:34:21	00:03:29	3	(Chile) Giovanni Enrico	Yamaha	13:57:44	00:19:39
4	1	(Chile) Ignacio Casale	Yamaha	05:22:42		1	(Chile) Ignacio Casale	Yamaha	19:00:47	
4	2	(Chile) Giovanni Enrico	Yamaha	05:24:06	00:01:24	2	(Chile) Giovanni Enrico	Yamaha	19:21:50	00:21:03
4	3	(France) Simon Vitse	Yamaha	05:26:04	00:03:22	3	(France) Simon Vitse	Yamaha	19:31:37	00:30:50
5	1	(France) Romain Dutu	Yamaha	05:07:44		1	(Chile) Ignacio Casale	Yamaha	24:10:47	
5	2	(France) Alexandre Giroud	Yamaha	05:08:31	00:00:47	2	(Chile) Giovanni Enrico	Yamaha	24:42:24	00:31:37
5	3	(Chile) Ignacio Casale	Yamaha	05:10:00	00:02:16	3	(France) Simon Vitse	Yamaha	24:52:26	00:41:39
6	1	(France) Simon Vitse	Yamaha	05:54:23		1	(Chile) Ignacio Casale	Yamaha	30:08:35	
6	2	(Chile) Ignacio Casale	Yamaha	05:57:48	00:03:25	2	(France) Simon Vitse	Yamaha	30:46:49	00:38:14
6	3	(France) Alexandre Giroud	Yamaha	05:57:59	00:03:36	3	(Poland) Rafał Sonik	Yamaha	31:22:54	01:14:19
7	1	(France) Simon Vitse	Yamaha	06:02:52		1	(Chile) Ignacio Casale	Yamaha	36:12:58	
7	2	(Chile) Giovanni Enrico	Yamaha	06:03:03	00:00:11	2	(France) Simon Vitse	Yamaha	36:49:41	00:36:43
7	3	(Chile) Ignacio Casale	Yamaha	06:04:23	00:01:31	3	(Poland) Rafał Sonik	Yamaha	37:36:29	01:23:31
8	Stage cancelled									
9	1	(Chile) Ignacio Casale	Yamaha	04:39:25		1	(Chile) Ignacio Casale	Yamaha	40:52:23	
9	2	(Chile) Giovanni Enrico	Yamaha	04:39:28	00:00:03	2	(France) Simon Vitse	Yamaha	41:37:20	00:44:57
9	3	(Czech Republic) Tomáš Kubiena	Yamaha	04:45:52	00:06:27	3	(Poland) Rafał Sonik	Yamaha	42:24:56	01:32:33
10	1	(Poland) Kamil Wiśniewski	Yamaha	03:04:11		1	(Chile) Ignacio Casale	Yamaha	44:41:33	
10	2	(Czech Republic) Zdeněk Tůma	Yamaha	03:04:59	00:00:48	2	(France) Simon Vitse	Yamaha	44:57:51	00:16:18
10	3	(Poland) Rafał Sonik	Yamaha	03:07:53	00:03:42	3	(Poland) Rafał Sonik	Yamaha	45:47:49	01:06:16
11	1	(Poland) Rafał Sonik	Yamaha	05:22:18		1	(Chile) Ignacio Casale	Yamaha	50:07:07	
11	2	(Chile) Ignacio Casale	Yamaha	05:25:34	00:03:16	2	(France) Simon Vitse	Yamaha	50:28:23	00:21:16
11	3	(Chile) Giovanni Enrico^{See note}	Yamaha	05:26:37	00:04:19	3	(Poland) Rafał Sonik	Yamaha	51:10:07	01:03:00
Note: Giovanni Enrico is competing in the Dakar Experience category and does not appear in the overall rankings. He did not finish Stage 6 due to mechanical failure.
12	1	(Poland) Arkadiusz Lindner	Can-Am	01:53:15		1	(Chile) Ignacio Casale	Yamaha	52:04:39	
12	2	(Chile) Giovanni Enrico^{See note}	Yamaha	01:54:36	00:01:21	2	(France) Simon Vitse	Yamaha	52:23:03	00:18:24
12	3	(France) Simon Vitse	Yamaha	01:54:40	00:01:25	3	(Poland) Rafał Sonik	Yamaha	53:08:54	01:04:15
Note: Giovanni Enrico is competing in the Dakar Experience category and does not appear in the overall rankings. He did not finish Stage 6 due to mechanical failure.

=== Cars ===
	Stage result					General classification				
Stage	Pos	Competitor	Make	Time	Gap	Pos	Competitor	Make	Time	Gap
1	1	(Lithuania) Vaidotas Žala	Mini	03:19:04		1	(Lithuania) Vaidotas Žala	Mini	03:19:04	
1	2	(France) Stéphane Peterhansel	Mini	03:21:18	00:02:14	2	(France) Stéphane Peterhansel	Mini	03:21:18	00:02:14
1	3	(Spain) Carlos Sainz	Mini	03:21:54	00:02:50	3	(Spain) Carlos Sainz	Mini	03:21:54	00:02:50
2	1	(South Africa) Giniel De Villiers	Toyota	03:37:20		1	(Argentina) Orlando Terranova	Mini	07:07:36	
2	2	(Argentina) Orlando Terranova	Mini	03:41:17	00:03:57	2	(Spain) Carlos Sainz	Mini	07:12:19	00:04:43
2	3	(United Arab Emirates) Sheikh Khalid Al Qassimi	Peugeot	03:43:02	00:05:42	3	(Qatar) Nasser Al-Attiyah	Toyota	07:13:43	00:06:07
3	1	(Spain) Carlos Sainz	Mini	03:48:01		1	(Spain) Carlos Sainz	Mini	11:00:20	
3	2	(Poland) Jakub Przygoński	Mini	03:52:20	00:04:19	2	(Qatar) Nasser Al-Attiyah	Toyota	11:08:15	00:07:55
3	3	(Saudi Arabia) Yasir Hamad Seaidan	Mini	03:53:29	00:05:28	3	(Argentina) Orlando Terranova	Mini	11:08:29	00:08:09
4	1	(France) Stéphane Peterhansel	Mini	04:04:34		1	(Spain) Carlos Sainz	Mini	15:12:12	
4	2	(Qatar) Nasser Al-Attiyah	Toyota	04:07:00	00:02:26	2	(Qatar) Nasser Al-Attiyah	Toyota	15:15:15	00:03:03
4	3	(Spain) Carlos Sainz	Mini	04:11:52	00:07:18	3	(France) Stéphane Peterhansel	Mini	15:23:54	00:11:42
5	1	(Spain) Carlos Sainz	Mini	03:52:01		1	(Spain) Carlos Sainz	Mini	19:04:13	
5	2	(Qatar) Nasser Al-Attiyah	Toyota	03:54:57	00:02:56	2	(Qatar) Nasser Al-Attiyah	Toyota	19:10:12	00:05:59
5	3	(France) Stéphane Peterhansel	Mini	03:58:12	00:07:18	3	(France) Stéphane Peterhansel	Mini	19:22:06	00:17:53
6	1	(France) Stéphane Peterhansel	Mini	04:27:17		1	(Spain) Carlos Sainz	Mini	23:33:03	
6	2	(Spain) Carlos Sainz	Mini	04:28:50	00:01:33	2	(Qatar) Nasser Al-Attiyah	Toyota	23:40:51	00:07:48
6	3	(Qatar) Nasser Al-Attiyah	Toyota	04:30:39	00:03:22	3	(France) Stéphane Peterhansel	Mini	23:49:23	00:16:20
7	1	(Spain) Carlos Sainz	Mini	04:16:11		1	(Spain) Carlos Sainz	Mini	27:49:14	
7	2	(Qatar) Nasser Al-Attiyah	Toyota	04:18:23	00:02:12	2	(Qatar) Nasser Al-Attiyah	Toyota	27:59:14	00:10:00
7	3	(France) Stéphane Peterhansel	Mini	04:18:23	00:02:53	3	(France) Stéphane Peterhansel	Mini	28:08:27	00:19:13
8	1	(France) Mathieu Serradori	Century	03:48:23		1	(Spain) Carlos Sainz	Mini	31:56:52	
8	2	(Spain) Fernando Alonso	Toyota	03:52:27	00:04:04	2	(Qatar) Nasser Al-Attiyah	Toyota	32:03:32	00:06:40
8	3	(Argentina) Orlando Terranova	Mini	03:54:42	00:06:19	3	(France) Stéphane Peterhansel	Mini	32:10:01	00:13:09
9	1	(France) Stéphane Peterhansel	Mini	03:08:31		1	(Spain) Carlos Sainz	Mini	35:11:54	
9	2	(Qatar) Nasser Al-Attiyah	Toyota	03:08:46	00:00:15	2	(Qatar) Nasser Al-Attiyah	Toyota	35:12:18	00:00:24
9	3	(Saudi Arabia) Yasir Hamad Seaidan	Mini	03:13:19	00:04:48	3	(France) Stéphane Peterhansel	Mini	35:18:12	00:06:38
10	1	(Spain) Carlos Sainz	Mini	02:03:43		1	(Spain) Carlos Sainz	Mini	37:15:37	
10	2	(Poland) Jakub Przygoński	Mini	02:06:48	00:03:05	2	(Qatar) Nasser Al-Attiyah	Toyota	37:33:47	00:18:10
10	3	(South Africa) Giniel de Villiers	Toyota	02:08:09	00:04:26	3	(France) Stéphane Peterhansel	Mini	37:34:03	00:18:26
11	1	(France) Stéphane Peterhansel	Mini	04:14:11		1	(Spain) Carlos Sainz	Mini	41:37:51	
11	2	(Qatar) Nasser Al-Attiyah	Toyota	04:14:21	00:00:10	2	(Qatar) Nasser Al-Attiyah	Toyota	41:48:08	00:10:17
11	3	(Spain) Carlos Sainz	Mini	04:22:14	00:08:03	3	(France) Stéphane Peterhansel	Mini	41:48:14	00:10:23
12	1	(Qatar) Nasser Al-Attiyah	Toyota	01:17:30		1	(Spain) Carlos Sainz	Mini	42:59:17	
12	2	(Saudi Arabia) Yasir Hamad Seaidan	Mini	01:19:02	00:01:32	2	(Qatar) Nasser Al-Attiyah	Toyota	43:05:38	00:06:21
12	3	(Argentina) Orlando Terranova	Mini	01:20:46	00:03:16	3	(France) Stéphane Peterhansel	Mini	43:09:15	00:09:58

=== UTVs ===
	Stage result					General classification				
Stage	Pos	Competitor	Make	Time	Gap	Pos	Competitor	Make	Time	Gap
1	1	(Poland) Aron Domżała	Can-Am	04:00:58		1	(Poland) Aron Domżała	Can-Am	04:00:58	
1	2	(United States) Casey Currie	Can-Am	04:02:49	00:01:51	2	(United States) Casey Currie	Can-Am	04:02:49	00:01:51
1	3	(Spain) José Antonio Hinojo López	Can-Am	04:06:47	00:05:49	3	(Spain) José Antonio Hinojo López	Can-Am	04:06:47	00:05:49
2	1	(Chile) Francisco López Contardo	Can-Am	04:13:30		1	(Chile) Francisco López Contardo	Can-Am	08:21:15	
2	2	(Zimbabwe) Conrad Rautenbach	PH Sport	04:25:18	00:11:48	2	(United States) Casey Currie	Can-Am	08:30:52	00:09:37
2	3	(United States) Austin Jones	Can-Am	04:25:25	00:11:55	3	(Spain) José Antonio Hinojo López	Can-Am	08:34:03	00:12:48
3	1	(Spain) Gerard Farrés Güell	Can-Am	04:42:47		1	(United States) Casey Currie	Can-Am	13:15:16	
3	2	(Russia) Sergey Karyakin	BRP	04:43:05	00:00:18	2	(Chile) Francisco López Contardo	Can-Am	13:15:31	00:00:15
3	3	(United States) Casey Currie	Can-Am	04:44:24	00:01:37	3	(Spain) José Antonio Hinojo López	Can-Am	13:16:56	00:01:40
4	1	(United States) Mitchell Guthrie	OT3	05:01:13		1	(Spain) José Antonio Hinojo López	Can-Am	18:24:52	
4	2	(Poland) Aron Domżała	Can-Am	05:01:32	00:00:19	2	(Chile) Francisco López Contardo	Can-Am	18:27:53	00:03:01
4	3	(United States) Austin Jones	Can-Am	05:02:27	00:01:14	3	(United States) Casey Currie	Can-Am	18:29:26	00:04:34
5	1	(France) Cyril Despres^{See note}	OT3	04:40:43		1	(Russia) Sergey Karyakin	BRP	23:21:52	
5	2	(Poland) Aron Domżała	Can-Am	04:41:24	00:00:41	2	(United States) Casey Currie	Can-Am	23:23:02	00:01:10
5	3	(Zimbabwe) Conrad Rautenbach	Can-Am	04:44:57	00:04:14	3	(Chile) Francisco López Contardo	Can-Am	23:23:39	00:01:47
Note: Cyril Despres is competing in Dakar Experience category, and do not appear in the Overall standings. He did not complete Stage 3 due to engine failure.
6	1	(Spain) Gerard Farrés Güell	Can-Am	05:27:25		1	(Chile) Francisco López Contardo	Can-Am	28:52:26	
6	2	(Chile) Francisco López Contardo	Can-Am	05:28:47	00:01:22	2	(United States) Casey Currie	Can-Am	29:02:14	00:09:48
6	3	(Brazil) Reinaldo Varela	Can-Am	05:32:24	00:04:59	3	(Russia) Sergey Karyakin	BRP	29:22:50	00:30:24
7	1	(United States) Blade Hildebrand	OT3	05:26:35		1	(United States) Casey Currie	Can-Am	34:40:04	
7	2	(United States) Casey Currie	Can-Am	05:37:50	00:11:15	2	(Chile) Francisco López Contardo	Can-Am	35:12:07	00:32:03
7	3	(Poland) Aron Domżała	Can-Am	05:39:51	00:13:16	3	(Russia) Sergey Karyakin	BRP	35:23:01	00:42:57
8	1	(Brazil) Reinaldo Varela	Can-Am	04:50:48		1	(United States) Casey Currie	Can-Am	39:47:37	
8	2	(Chile) Francisco López Contardo	Can-Am	04:51:10	00:00:22	2	(Chile) Francisco López Contardo	Can-Am	40:03:17	00:15:40
8	3	(United States) Austin Jones	Can-Am	04:58:09	00:07:21	3	(Russia) Sergey Karyakin	BRP	40:22:06	00:34:29
9	1	(United States) Blade Hildebrand^{See note}	OT3	4:00:42		1	(United States) Casey Currie	Can-Am	43:51:49	
9	2	(United States) Mitchell Guthrie^{See note}	Can-Am	04:01:40	00:00:58	2	(Chile) Francisco López Contardo	Can-Am	44:15:26	00:23:37
9	3	(United States) Casey Currie	Can-Am	04:04:12	00:03:30	3	(Russia) Sergey Karyakin	BRP	44:33:15	00:41:26
Note: Both Blade Hildebrand and Mitchell Guthrie are competing in the "Dakar Experience" category and do not appear in the overall rankings. Both drivers failed to finish a previous stage of the rally.
10	1	(United States) Mitchell Guthrie^{See note}	OT3	02:23:47		1	(United States) Casey Currie	Can-Am	46:22:15	
10	2	(United States) Blade Hildebrand^{See note}	OT3	02:24:12	00:00:25	2	(Russia) Sergey Karyakin	BRP	47:08:55	00:46:40
10	3	(Spain) Gerard Farrés Güell	Can-Am	02:25:09	00:01:22	3	(Chile) Francisco López Contardo	Can-Am	47:37:14	01:14:58
Note: Mitchell Guthrie and Blade Hildebrand are competing in the Dakar Experience category and do not appear in the overall rankings. Both drivers failed to finish a previous stage of the rally.
11	1	(Chile) Francisco López Contardo	Can-Am	04:59:51		1	(United States) Casey Currie	Can-Am	51:39:32	
11	2	(Poland) Aron Domżała	Can-Am	05:10:44	00:10:53	2	(Russia) Sergey Karyakin	BRP	52:25:05	00:45:33
11	3	(Zimbabwe) Conrad Rautenbach	PH Sport	05:12:27	00:12:36	3	(Chile) Francisco López Contardo	Can-Am	52:37:04	00:57:32
12	1	(Brazil) Reinaldo Varela	Can-Am	01:36:19		1	(United States) Casey Currie	Can-Am	53:25:52	
12	2	(United States) Blade Hildebrand^{See note}	OT3	01:36:43	00:00:24	2	(Russia) Sergey Karyakin	BRP	54:05:04	00:39:12
12	3	(United States) Austin Jones	Can-Am	01:39:37	00:03:18	3	(Chile) Francisco López Contardo	Can-Am	54:18:28	00:52:36
Note: Blade Hildebrand is competing in the Dakar Experience category and does not appear in the overall rankings. He failed to finish a previous stage of the rally.

=== Trucks ===
	Stage result					General classification				
Stage	Pos	Competitor	Make	Time	Gap	Pos	Competitor	Make	Time	Gap
1	1	(Russia) Anton Shibalov	Kamaz	03:40:35		1	(Russia) Anton Shibalov	Kamaz	03:40:35	
1	2	(Belarus) Siarhei Viazovich	MAZ	03:42:08	00:01:33	2	(Belarus) Siarhei Viazovich	MAZ	03:42:08	00:01:33
1	3	(Netherlands) Janus van Kasteren	Iveco	03:43:44	00:03:09	3	(Netherlands) Janus van Kasteren	Iveco	03:43:44	00:03:09
2	1	(Belarus) Siarhei Viazovich	MAZ	03:47:44		1	(Belarus) Siarhei Viazovich	MAZ	07:29:52	
2	2	(Russia) Dmitry Sotnikov	Kamaz	03:49:30	00:01:46	2	(Russia) Dmitry Sotnikov	Kamaz	07:34:12	00:04:20
2	3	(Russia) Andrey Karginov	Kamaz	03:49:51	00:02:07	3	(Russia) Andrey Karginov	Kamaz	07:37:04	00:07:12
3	1	(Russia) Andrey Karginov	Kamaz	03:59:15		1	(Belarus) Siarhei Viazovich	MAZ	11:34:01	
3	2	(Belarus) Siarhei Viazovich	MAZ	04:04:39	00:04:54	2	(Russia) Andrey Karginov	Kamaz	11:36:19	00:02:18
3	3	(Russia) Anton Shibalov	Kamaz	04:10:28	00:11:13	3	(Russia) Anton Shibalov	Kamaz	11:54:02	00:20:01
4	1	(Russia) Anton Shibalov	Kamaz	04:15:43		1	(Russia) Andrey Karginov	Kamaz	15:54:43	
4	2	(Russia) Andrey Karginov	Kamaz	04:18:24	00:02:41	2	(Belarus) Siarhei Viazovich	MAZ	16:05:26	00:10:43
4	3	(Russia) Dmitry Sotnikov	Kamaz	04:24:48	00:09:05	3	(Russia) Anton Shibalov	Kamaz	16:09:45	00:15:02
5	1	(Russia) Dmitry Sotnikov	Kamaz	04:12:04		1	(Russia) Andrey Karginov	Kamaz	20:10:02	
5	2	(Russia) Anton Shibalov	Kamaz	04:15:10	00:03:06	2	(Russia) Anton Shibalov	Kamaz	20:24:55	00:14:53
5	3	(Russia) Andrey Karginov	Kamaz	04:15:19	00:03:15	3	(Belarus) Siarhei Viazovich	MAZ	20:34:00	00:23:58
6	1	(Russia) Andrey Karginov	Kamaz	04:56:18		1	(Russia) Andrey Karginov	Kamaz	25:06:20	
6	2	(Russia) Anton Shibalov	Kamaz	05:00:39	00:04:21	2	(Russia) Anton Shibalov	Kamaz	25:25:34	00:19:14
6	3	(Belarus) Siarhei Viazovich	MAZ	05:08:50	00:12:32	3	(Belarus) Siarhei Viazovich	MAZ	25:42:50	00:36:30
7	1	(Russia) Andrey Karginov	Kamaz	05:01:02		1	(Russia) Andrey Karginov	Kamaz	30:06:45	
7	2	(Russia) Dmitry Sotnikov	Kamaz	05:01:05	00:00:03	2	(Russia) Anton Shibalov	Kamaz	30:27:57	00:21:12
7	3	(Russia) Anton Shibalov	Kamaz	05:03:07	00:02:05	3	(Belarus) Siarhei Viazovich	MAZ	30:53:24	00:46:39
8	1	(Russia) Andrey Karginov	Kamaz	04:24:58		1	(Russia) Andrey Karginov	Kamaz	34:31:43	
8	2	(Russia) Anton Shibalov	Kamaz	04:30:52	00:05:54	2	(Russia) Anton Shibalov	Kamaz	34:58:49	00:27:06
8	3	(Czech Republic) Aleš Loprais	Tatra	04:34:04	00:09:06	3	(Belarus) Siarhei Viazovich	MAZ	35:37:00	01:05:17
9	1	(Russia) Andrey Karginov	Kamaz	03:33:42		1	(Russia) Andrey Karginov	Kamaz	38:05:25	
9	2	(Belarus) Siarhei Viazovich	MAZ	03:37:01	00:03:19	2	(Russia) Anton Shibalov	Kamaz	38:44:00	00:38:35
9	3	(Russia) Eduard Nikolaev^{See note}	Kamaz	03:43:06	00:09:24	3	(Belarus) Siarhei Viazovich	MAZ	39:14:01	01:08:36
Note: Eduard Nikolaev is competing in the Dakar Experience category and does not appear in the general classification. He did not complete Stage 6 due to engine failure.
10	1	(Russia) Anton Shibalov	Kamaz	02:12:12		1	(Russia) Andrey Karginov	Kamaz	40:20:04	
10	2	(Russia) Dmitry Sotnikov	Kamaz	02:13:20	00:01:08	2	(Russia) Anton Shibalov	Kamaz	40:56:12	00:36:08
10	3	(Russia) Eduard Nikolaev^{See note}	Kamaz	02:13:42	00:01:30	3	(Belarus) Siarhei Viazovich	MAZ	42:00:04	01:40:00
Note: Eduard Nikolaev is competing in the Dakar Experience category and does not appear in the general classification. He did not complete Stage 6 due to engine failure.
11	1	(Russia) Andrey Karginov	Kamaz	04:44:51		1	(Russia) Andrey Karginov	Kamaz	45:04:55	
11	2	(Russia) Dmitry Sotnikov	Kamaz	04:46:18	00:01:27	2	(Russia) Anton Shibalov	Kamaz	45:44:28	00:39:33
11	3	(Russia) Anton Shibalov	Kamaz	04:48:16	00:03:25	3	(Belarus) Siarhei Viazovich	MAZ	46:57:09	01:52:14
12	1	(Russia) Andrey Karginov	Kamaz	01:28:41		1	(Russia) Andrey Karginov	Kamaz	46:33:36	
12	2	(Belarus) Aliaksei Vishneuski	MAZ	01:30:42	00:02:01	2	(Russia) Anton Shibalov	Kamaz	47:16:02	00:42:26
12	3	(Russia) Eduard Nikolaev^{See note}	Kamaz	01:30:48	00:02:07	3	(Belarus) Siarhei Viazovich	MAZ	48:38:18	02:04:42
Note: Eduard Nikolaev is competing in the Dakar Experience category and does not appear in the general classification. He did not complete Stage 6 due to engine failure.

== Final standings ==
=== Bikes ===
Pos	No.	Rider	Brand	Time
1	9	(United States) Ricky Brabec	Honda	40:02:36
2	5	(Chile) Pablo Quintanilla	Husqvarna	+0:16:26
3	1	(Australia) Toby Price	KTM	+0:24:06
4	17	(Chile) José Ignacio Cornejo Florimo	Honda	+0:31:43
5	2	(Austria) Matthias Walkner	KTM	+0:35:00
6	16	(Argentina) Luciano Benavides	KTM	+0:37:34
7	12	(Spain) Joan Barreda Bort	Honda	+0:50:57
8	22	(Argentina) Franco Caimi	Yamaha	+1:42:35
9	59	(United States) Skyler Howes	Husqvarna	+2:04:01
10	6	(United States) Andrew Short	Husqvarna	+2:10:40

=== Quads ===
Pos	No.	Rider	Brand	Time
1	250	(Chile) Ignacio Casale	Yamaha	52:04:39
2	265	(France) Simon Vitse	Yamaha	+0:18:24
3	251	(Poland) Rafał Sonik	Yamaha	+1:04:15
4	255	(Argentina) Manuel Andújar	Yamaha	+3:30:16
5	257	(Poland) Kamil Wiśniewski	Yamaha	+4:38:53
6	262	(France) Sebastien Souday	Yamaha	+5:45:14
7	268	(Chile) Italo Pedemonte	Yamaha	+6:34:28
8	254	(Paraguay) Nelson Sanabria Galeano	Yamaha	+8:56:03
9	263	(Czech Republic) Zdeněk Tůma	Yamaha	+15:58:30
10	261	(Argentina) Martin Sarquiz	Can-Am	+17:14:39

=== Cars ===
Pos	No.	Driver	Co-driver	Brand	Team	Time
1	305	(Spain) Carlos Sainz	(Spain) Lucas Cruz	Mini	Bahrain JCW X-Raid Team	42:59:17
2	300	(Qatar) Nasser Al-Attiyah	(France) Matthieu Baumel	Toyota	Toyota Gazoo Racing	+0:06:21
3	302	(France) Stéphane Peterhansel	(Portugal) Paulo Fiúza	Mini	Bahrain JCW X-Raid Team	+0:09:58
4	309	(Saudi Arabia) Yazeed Al Rajhi	(Russia) Konstantin Zhiltsov	Toyota	Overdrive Toyota	+0:49:10
5	304	(South Africa) Giniel de Villiers	(Spain) Alex Haro Bravo	Toyota	Toyota Gazoo Racing	+1:07:09
6	311	(Argentina) Orlando Terranova	(Argentina) Bernardo Graue	Mini	X-Raid Mini JCW Team	+1:12:15
7	307	(Netherlands) Bernhard ten Brinke	(Belgium) Tom Colsoul	Toyota	Toyota Gazoo Racing	+1:18:34
8	315	(France) Mathieu Serradori	(Belgium) Fabian Lurquin	Century	SRT Racing	+1:59:21
9	324	(Saudi Arabia) Yasir Hamad Seaidan	(Russia) Alexy Kuzmich	Mini	Race World Team	+3:42:17
10	322	(China) Wei Han	(China) Min Liao	Hanwei	Geely Auto Shell Lubricant Team	+3:51:07

=== UTVs ===
Pos	No.	Driver	Co-driver	Brand	Team	Time
1	405	(United States) Casey Currie	(United States) Sean Berriman	Can-Am	Monster Energy Can-Am	53:25:52
2	411	(Russia) Sergey Karyakin	(Russia) Anton Vlasiuk	BRP	Snag Racing Team	+0:39:12
3	400	(Chile) Francisco López Contardo	(Chile) Juan Pablo Latrach Vinagre	Can-Am	South Racing Can-Am	+0:52:36
4	404	(Zimbabwe) Conrad Rautenbach	(Portugal) Pedro Bianchi Prata	PH-Sport	PH-Sport	+1:12:19
5	410	(Spain) José Antonio Hinojo López	(Spain) Diego Ortega Gil	Can-Am	Hibor Raid	+1:20:38
6	420	(Spain) Jesús Puras	(Spain) Xavier Blanco	Can-Am	Xraids & Buggymaster Team	+2:19:15
7	417	(France) Axel Alletru	(Belgium) Francois Beguin	Can-Am	# Je Peux 2020-BBR Mercier Racing	+2:24:23
8	427	(United States) Austin Jones	(United States) Kellon Walch	Can-Am	South Racing Can-Am	+2:57:38
9	402	(Brazil) Reinaldo Varela	(Brazil) Gustavo Gugelmin	Can-Am	Monster Energy Can-Am	+5:44:01
10	433	(Spain) Santiago Navarro	(Spain) Marc Solà Terradellas	Can-Am	FN Speed Team	+5:44:35

=== Trucks ===
Pos	No.	Driver	Co-driver	Mechanic	Brand	Team	Time
1	511	(Russia) Andrey Karginov	(Russia) Andrey Mokeev	(Russia) Igor Leonov	Kamaz	Kamaz Master	46:33:36
2	516	(Russia) Anton Shibalov	(Russia) Dmitrii Nikitin	(Russia) Ivan Tatarinov	Kamaz	Kamaz Master	+0:42:26
3	503	(Belarus) Siarhei Viazovich	(Belarus) Pavel Haranin	(Belarus) Anton Zaparoshchanka	MAZ	MAZ-Sportauto	+2:04:42
4	501	(Russia) Dmitry Sotnikov	(Russia) Ruslan Akhmadeev	(Russia) Ilgiz Akhmetzianov	Kamaz	Kamaz Master	+2:55:28
5	504	(Czech Republic) Martin Macik	(Czech Republic) František Tomášek	(Czech Republic) David Švanda	Iveco	Big Shock Racing	+3:28:08
6	505	(Netherlands) Janus Van Kasteren	(Poland) Darek Rodewald	(Netherlands) Marcel Snijders	Iveco	Petronas Team De Rooy Iveco	+4:26:57
7	502	(Czech Republic) Aleš Loprais	(Czech Republic) Petr Pokora	(United Arab Emirates) Khalid Alkendi	Tatra	Instaforex Loprais Team	+5:16:57
8	528	(Belarus) Aliaksei Vishneuski	(Belarus) Maksim Novikau	(Belarus) Andrei Neviarovich	MAZ	MAZ-Sportauto	+5:24:30
9	521	(France) Patrice Garrouste	(Poland) Szymon Gospodarczyk	(Czech Republic) Petr Vojkovský	Tatra	Fesh Fesh / R-sixteam	+6:07:53
10	512	(Japan) Teruhito Sugawara	(Japan) Yuji Mochizuki	(Japan) Hirokazu Somemiya	Hino	Hino Team Sugawara	+6:18:39

=== Original by Motul ===
The “Original by Motul” category, refers to bikes and quads competitors competing without any kind of assistance. The organizers provide 1 trunk per competitor for storage of the personal belongings, spare parts and tools. Competitors are only allowed to bring 1 headlight, 1 set of wheels, 1 set of tyres, 1 tent with sleeping bag and mattress, 1 travel bag and 1x 25L backpack. Organizers allow free use of the generators, compressors and tool-boxes in the bivouac. 38 competitors started the race in this category, and 27 reached the finish.

Top 10

Pos	No.	Rider	Brand	Time
1	44	(Romania) Emanuel Gyenes	KTM	48:05:07
2	39	(France) Benjamin Melot	KTM	+1:12:34
3	69	(France) Florent Vayssade	KTM	+2:33:39
4	52	(Czech Republic) Petr Vlček	Husqvarna	+3:46:26
5	138	(France) Romain Leloup	KTM	+3:55:25
6	71	(Poland) Krzysztof Jarmuż	KTM	+6:29:38
7	57	(France) Philippe Cavelius	KTM	+6:58:53
8	97	(Slovenia) Simon Marčič	KTM	+7:37:55
9	133	(Russia) Dmitry Agoshkov	KTM	+8:48:50
10	128	(Colombia) Giordano Pacheco	KTM	+9:27:13

== Fatalities ==
On 12 January 2020, Portuguese motorcycle rider Paulo Gonçalves suffered a crash 276 kilometres into Stage 7 and went into cardiac arrest following severe trauma to the head, neck and backbone. Several riders stopped in an attempt to aid Gonçalves before paramedics arrived, but Gonçalves was declared dead upon arrival at the hospital. It was the 13th Dakar event for Paulo. Following the accident, Stage 8 was cancelled for the bike and quad classes. Hero Motorsports Team Rally, for whom Gonçalves had been riding, elected to withdraw its remaining entries following the crash.

On 16 January 2020 during the 11th stage, Dutch KTM rider Edwin Straver crashed his motorcycle and suffered a fractured cervical vertebra. Initial reports indicated that he had no heartbeat for 10 minutes before being resuscitated and transported to hospital in Riyadh. Straver was listed in critical condition and remained in a coma for several days before being transported back to the Netherlands. After receiving diagnosis of significant brain damage from the crash, Straver's family elected to cease assisted respiration, and Straver died on January 24, 2020.

== See also ==
- Dakar Rally
- List of Dakar Rally records
- List of Dakar Rally competitors
- List of Dakar Rally fatal accidents
- A.S.O.
