= Vaidotas Žala =

Lithuanian rally and rally-raid driver

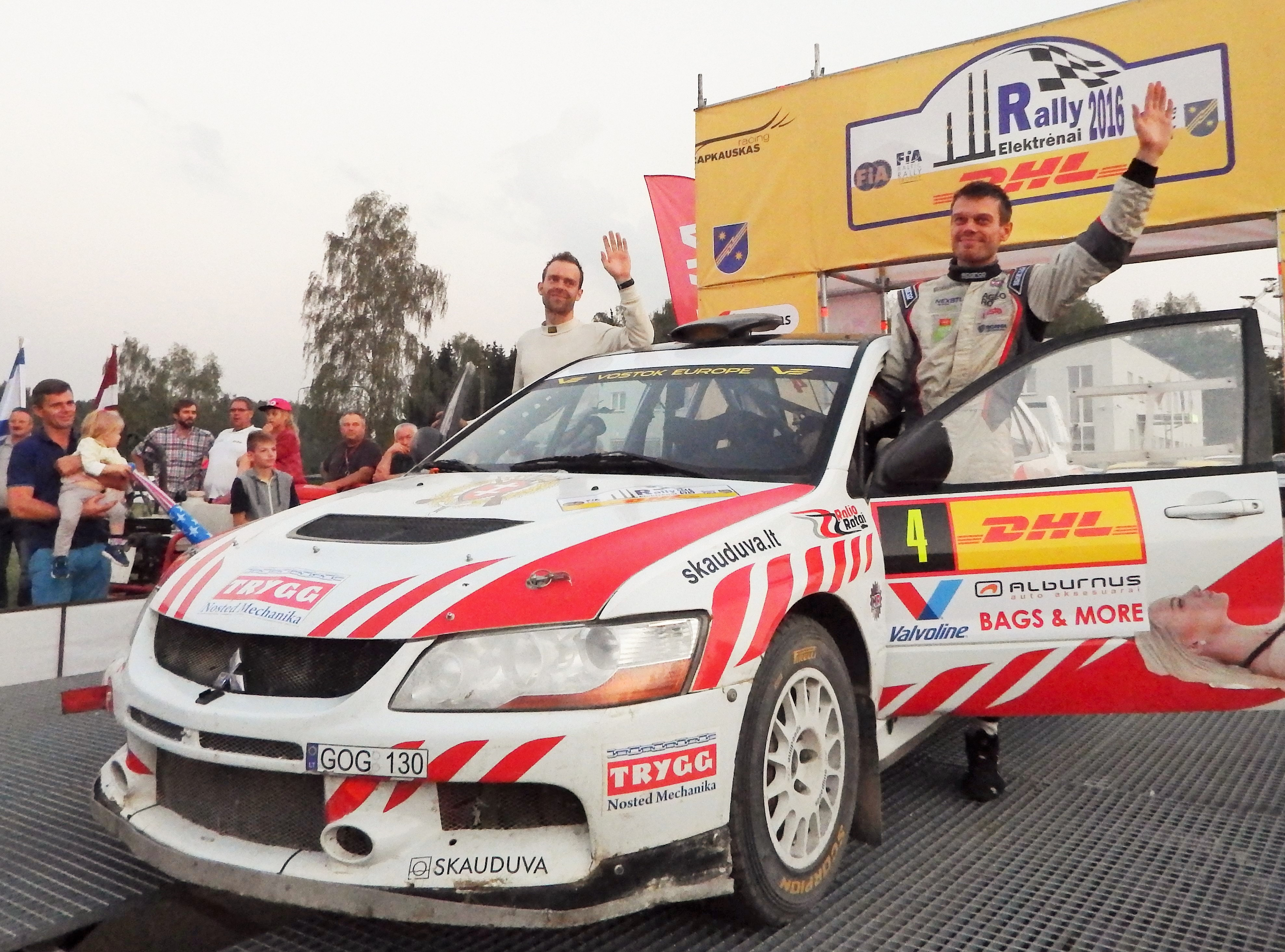

Personal information
- Nationality: (Lithuania) Lithuanian
- Born: August 28, 1987 (age 39)
- Height: 183 cm (6 ft 0 in)
- Weight: 75 kg (165 lb)

Sport
- Country: Lithuania
- Sport: Rallying, Rally-raid
- Team: Agrorodeo

Vaidotas Žala (born August 28, 1987) is a Lithuanian rally and rally-raid driver. Žala won the Lithuanian Rally Champion, winning the title in 2019 and 2020, both when driving for the Agrorodeo racing team with Škoda Fabia R5. In addition to participating in various classic rally events, Žala has been participating in the Dakar Rally since 2016, with his start in 2021 being his sixth consecutive start at the Rally-raid marathon. Žala is also the first Lithuanian to win a stage in the Dakar Rally. Žala finished first in the opening stage of 2020 Dakar Rally. Zala won the 2026 Dakar Rally in the trucks class in his second attempt in the category.

== Rally racing record ==
=== Rally starts ===
Year	2011	2012	2013	2014	2015	2016	2017	2018	2019	2020
(Lithuania) Lithuanian Rally Championship	6	5	7	4	6	5	3	4	6	4
(Latvia) Latvian Rally Championship	3								2	
(Estonia) Estonian Rally Championship	1									
Belarus Rally Championship			4							
Norway Rally Championship				1						
(Europe) European Rally Championship									2	
(Europe) NEZ Rally Championship					1					

=== Rally victories ===
#	Event	Season	Co-driver	Car
1	(Belarus) Rally Ozerniy Kray 2013	2013	(Lithuania) Dainius Alekna	Subaru Impreza STi N12
2	(Lithuania) Rally Classic Druskininkai 2014	2014	(Lithuania) Žygimantas Žala	Subaru Impreza STi N12
3	(Lithuania) Rally Elektrėnai 2015	2015	(Lithuania) Žygimantas Žala	Mitsubishi Lancer Evo IX
4	(Lithuania) Rally Classic Druskininkai 2015	2015	(Lithuania) Žygimantas Žala	Mitsubishi Lancer Evo IX
5	(Lithuania) 300 Lakes Rally	2016	(Lithuania) Žygimantas Žala	Mitsubishi Lancer Evo IX
6	(Lithuania) Rally Žemaitija	2018	(Latvia) Andris Mālnieks	Škoda Fabia R5
7	(Lithuania) Samsonas Rally Rokiškis	2018	(Latvia) Andris Mālnieks	Škoda Fabia R5
8	(Lithuania) Rally Classic 2018	2018	(Latvia) Andris Mālnieks	Škoda Fabia R5
9	(Lithuania) Rally Žemaitija 2019	2019	(Latvia) Andris Mālnieks	Škoda Fabia R5
10	(Lithuania) Rally Elektrėnai 2019	2019	(Latvia) Andris Mālnieks	Škoda Fabia R5
11	(Lithuania) Samsonas Rally Rokiškis 2019	2019	(Latvia) Andris Mālnieks	Škoda Fabia R5
12	(Lithuania) Rally Classic 2019	2019	(Latvia) Andris Mālnieks	Škoda Fabia R5
13	(Lithuania) Rally Žemaitija 2020	2020	(Latvia) Andris Mālnieks	Škoda Fabia R5
14	(Lithuania) Rally Elektrėnai 2020	2020	(Latvia) Andris Mālnieks	Škoda Fabia R5

=== Championship victories ===
Žala won the Lithuanian Rally Championship title in 2019 and 2020. Assisted by his co-driver Andris Mālnieks, Žala came first with his Škoda Fabia R5 in LARČ 1 as well as 4WD classes.

=== Dakar results ===
Žala has regularly participated in the Dakar Rally since his debut in 2016. Žala and his co-driver Saulius Jurgelėnas failed to finish in 2016 and 2017 due to mechanical issues with their Lithuanian-built prototype rally car based on the Seat platform. Žala's best result to date is an 11th-place finish in 2022. In 2020, Žala made history by winning the opening stage and thus becoming the first Lithuanian to win a Dakar Rally stage. In 2026, Zala won the trucks category.

Year	Class	Starting number	Navigator	Vehicle	Stages won	Position
2016	Car	390	(Lithuania) Saulius Jurgelėnas	(Spain) (Lithuania) Seat Leon Dakar (a.k.a. Bitė)		DNF (10/13)
2017	Car	373	(Lithuania) Saulius Jurgelėnas	(Spain) (Lithuania) Seat Leon Dakar (a.k.a. Bitė)		DNF (4/12)
2018	Car	349	(Lithuania) Saulius Jurgelėnas	(Japan) Toyota Hilux Overdrive OTB (a.k.a. Kamanė)		18
2019	Car	337	(Lithuania) Saulius Jurgelėnas	(Japan) Toyota Hilux Overdrive OTB (a.k.a. Kamanė)		12
2020	Car	319	(Lithuania) Saulius Jurgelėnas	(United Kingdom) Mini John Cooper Works Rally (a.k.a. Mažylis)	1	26
2021	Car	325	(Portugal) Paulo Fiuza	(United Kingdom) Mini John Cooper Works Rally (a.k.a. Mažylis)		DNF (2/12)
2022	Car	234	(Portugal) Paulo Fiuza	(United Kingdom) Mini John Cooper Works Rally (a.k.a. Mažylis)		11
2023	Car	213	(Portugal) Paulo Fiuza	(United Kingdom) Prodrive BRX Hunter		DNF (12/14)
2024	Car	214	(Portugal) Paulo Fiuza	(United Kingdom) Mini John Cooper Works Rally Plus (a.k.a. Mažylis)		DNF (9/12) (54 - Dakar experience)
2025	Truck	605	(Portugal) Paulo Fiuza (Netherlands) Max van Grol	(Italy) (Australia) (Netherlands) Iveco Powerstar (a.k.a. Avilys)		5
2026	Truck	604	(Portugal) Paulo Fiuza (Netherlands) Max van Grol	(Italy) (Australia) (Netherlands) Iveco Powerstar (a.k.a. Avilys)	1	1
