= Emanuel Gyenes =

Romanian rally racing motorcycle rider (born 1984)

Emanuel Gyenes (born March 3, 1984, in Satu Mare, Romania) is a Romanian rally racing motorcycle rider. He won the Malle Moto class in the 2020 Dakar Rally and in the 2025 Dakar Rally (Original by Motul Category) for bike competitors racing without any kind of assistance.

== Dakar Rally results ==
Year	Position	Notes
2007	46th	
2009	Ret.	
2011	17th	Winner Marathon Class
2012	39th	
2015	21st	Winner Marathon Class
2016	14h	
2017	17th	
2018	23rd	
2019	Ret.	
2020	29th	Winner Malle Moto Class
2021	23rd	
2022	40th	
2023	27th	
2024	23rd	
2025	20th	Winner Original by Motul

== Other results ==
- Silver medal at the International Six Days Enduro 2007
- 2nd place at 450 cc at the 2008 Central Europe Rally (held as a replacement for the canceled 2008 Dakar Rally)
- 6th place in the overall classification in the Rallye des Pharaons 2008
