= Mini John Cooper Works Buggy =

Off-road competition car

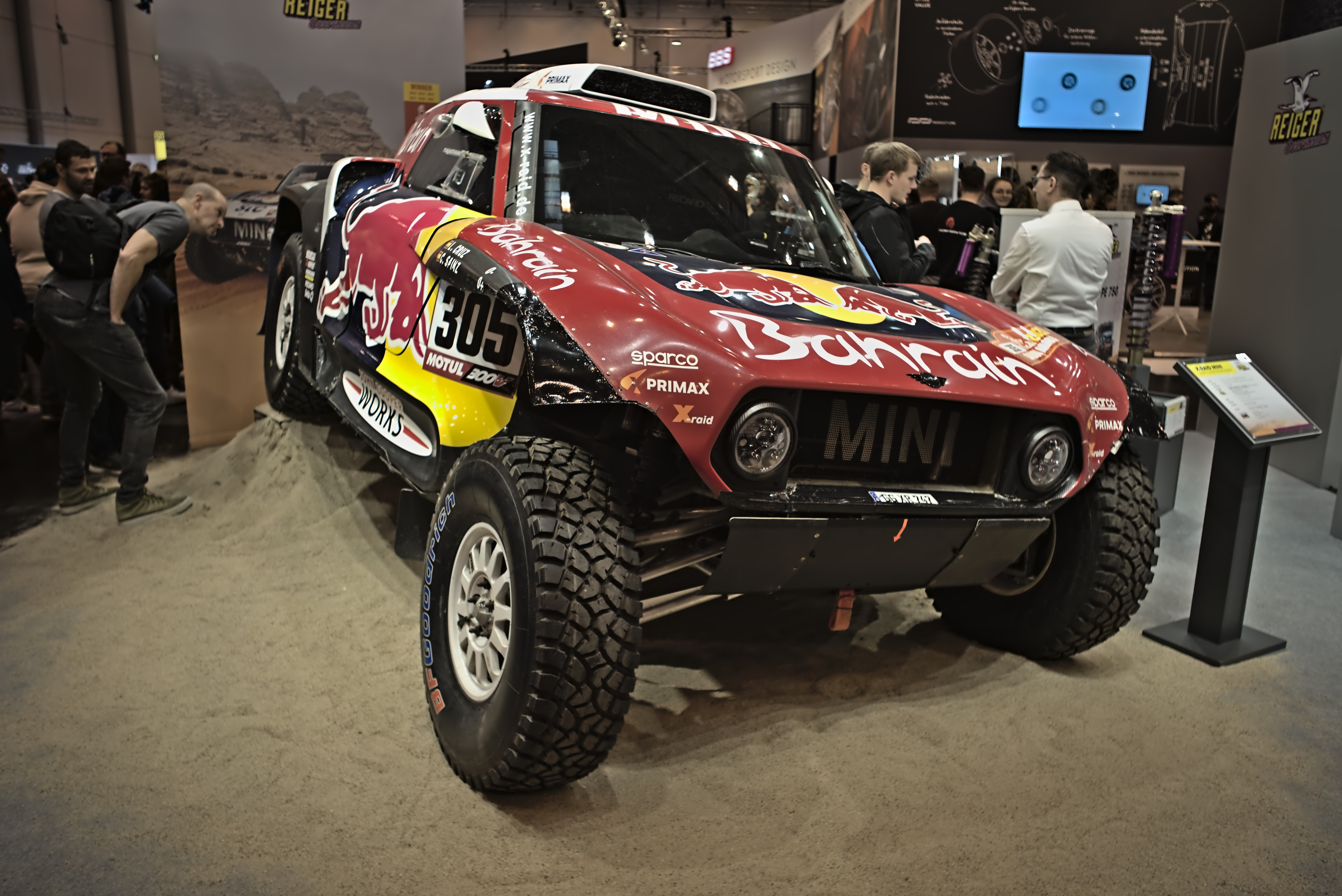

Overview
- Manufacturer: BMW
- Production: 2017–2022

Body and chassis
- Class: Rally raid
- Layout: rear wheel drive

Powertrain
- Engine: 3.0 L B57 I6 turbo (diesel)

Dimensions
- Length: 4,332 mm (170.6 in)
- Width: 2,200 mm (86.6 in)
- Height: 1,935 mm (76.2 in)
- Curb weight: 1,675 kg (3,692.7 lb)

Chronology
- Predecessor: Mini John Cooper Works Rally

The Mini John Cooper Works Buggy is an off-road competition car, built by X-raid under the Mini marque. The car won the 2019 FIA World Cup for Cross-Country Rallies and the 2020 and 2021 Dakar Rallies. The German racing team X-raid has been using the car since 2018.

== Competition history ==
X-raid participated in the 2018 Dakar Rally with two drivers in a new car Mikko Hirvonen and Dakar Rally newcomer Bryce Menzies. Hirvonen finished 19th when Menzies interrupted.

Stéphane Peterhansel, Carlos Sainz and Cyril Despres, who drove in a Peugeot at the 2018 Dakar Rally, moved to the X-raid Mini in 2019. Despres finished best in the trio after finishing fifth. Sainz finished 13th, winning one stage, while Peterhansel interrupted after winning two special stages before that. After the Dakar Rally, Peterhansel managed to win the 2019 FIA World Cup for Cross-Country Rallies season.

The 2020 Dakar Rally was driven for the first time in Saudi Arabia, with only Sainz and Peterhansel continuing as drivers. Sainz took the car's first Dakar Rally victory, having four stage wins during the race. Teammate Peterhansel finished third, also winning four special stages.

=== Dakar victories ===
| Year | Driver | Co-driver |
|---|---|---|
| 2020 | (Spain) Carlos Sainz | (Spain) Lucas Cruz |
| 2021 | (France) Stéphane Peterhansel | (France) Édouard Boulanger |

== See also ==
- Mini Countryman
- Mini John Cooper Works WRC
- Mini All4 Racing
- X-raid
