= Edwin Straver =

Dutch motorcycle racer (1971–2020)

- Nationality: Dutch
- Born: 12 April 1971 Almkerk, Netherlands
- Died: 24 January 2020 (aged 48) Netherlands
- Teams: KTM
- Championships: Dakar Rally
- Wins: 2019 "Original by Motul" Category

Edwin Straver (12 April 1971 – 24 January 2020) was a Dutch motorcycle racer.

== Career ==
Straver was particularly known for his participation in the Dakar Rally. He participated in 2018, 2019 and 2020. In 2019, he won the classification in the class in which the driver himself must do all the maintenance on the engine; the so-called "Original by Motul".

On 16 January, during the 11th stage of the Dakar 2020 rally in Saudi Arabia, Straver crashed his motorcycle. He was resuscitated on site and then taken to a hospital in Riyadh. It was found here that one of his upper cervical vertebrae was broken. On 22 January, he was transferred to the Netherlands, where he died two days later.

Straver was the son of five-time Dutch road racing champion for motorcycles Anton Straver.
