= Casey Currie =

American off-road racing driver

- Nationality: United States
- Born: December 5, 1983 (age 42)

Championship titles
- 2010 CORR Pro Light; 2020 Dakar Rally UTV

Casey Currie (born December 5, 1983) is an American off-road racing driver. Along with Ricky Brabec in the bike category, Currie was the first American to win at the Dakar Rally in 2020, having won the UTV category with Sean Berriman for Monster Energy Cam-Am. In 2010, he won the Pro Light championship in the Traxxas TORC Series. In 2017 he won the Baja 1000 in the Ultra 4 Class in a Trophy Jeep.

== Dakar Rally results ==
Year	Class	Vehicle	Position	Stages won
2019	UTV	Can-Am	4th	0
2020	UTV	Can-Am	1st	0
