= Gerard Farrés =

Spanish motorcycle racer (born 1979)

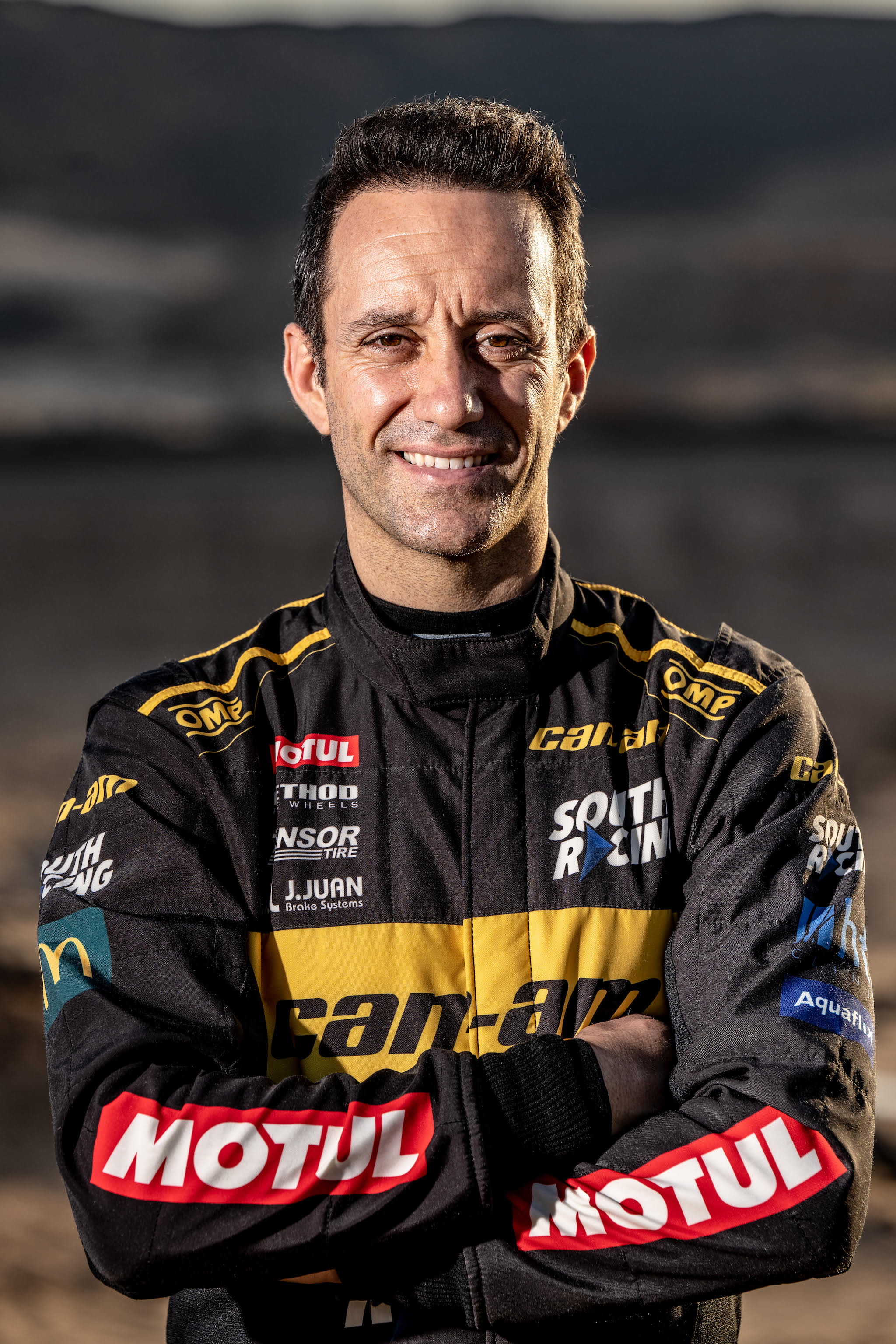
- Nationality: Spanish
- Born: 24 March 1979 (age 47) Manresa, Catalonia, Spain

Gerard Farrés i Güell (born 24 March 1979) is a Spanish motorcycle racer of enduro and rally raid. In rally raid, he finished in third place in the motorcycle category in the 2017 Dakar Rally and won Baja Aragón in the same category in 2007, 2009 and 2011.

== Early life and career ==
As a child, Farrés competed in BMX and mountain bike trials, and his first motorcycle was a Montesa Cota 49, while his first competition motorcycle was the Kawasaki 80 with which he competed against riders such as Jordi Viladoms and Xavier Pons. In 1997, he was summoned by the Royal Spanish Motorcycle Federation to participate in the Enduro World Championship.

== Career ==
=== Enduro ===
Farrés' first victories came in the International Six Days of Enduro in which he won the junior championship in 1998, 1999 and 2000, and in the Enduro World Championship he won the championship in the under-23 category. In 2001, he signed for KTM competing in the absolute enduro World Championship, racing for the Austrian brand until 2004. In 2005, he signed for Husqvarna where he finished runner-up in Spain in Cross-Country and finished third in the Spanish Enduro Championship.

=== Rally raid ===
In 2006, Farrés signed for Yamaha with which he got the chance to make his debut in the Dakar Rally. However, he injured his left knee, leaving him out for six months. After two months, however, he made his rally raid debut at the 2006 Dakar Rally in Lisbon. This led him to be dubbed the "Desert Boar". In this event, he finished the race in 16th position overall, having been the second best rookie in this event.

In 2007, Farrés returned to KTM where he won the Spanish Rally Raid Championship and also moved to the FIM Cross-Country Rallies World Championship where he made his debut in the Rally of Tunisia, finishing in fourth place. Later that year, he won the Baja Aragón for the first time. Due to injuries sustained in a rally in Dubai, he did not compete again until the 2009 Dakar Rally, where he performed well, helping his teammate and compatriot Marc Coma, to win the event in the motorcycle category. He won the Baja Aragón again later that year.

In 2010, Farrés signed with Aprilia for the Dakar Rally, a brand that was racing in that event for the first time. However, Farrés could not finish the race. In 2011, he won the Baja Aragón for the third time, and finished the Dakar Rally in 28th position. In 2012, he finished seventh in the Dakar, where he was riding a KTM for the Bordone Ferrari team. In 2013, he finished 69th overall with the Honda Wild Wolf team and in 2014 after being signed by Gas Gas he had to retire in 2014 and 2015 editions.

At the end of 2015, Farrés signed with Himoinsa, with whom he finished eighth in the 2016 Dakar Rally. With Himoinsa, he won the Hellas Rally and the Transanatolia Rally. The following year, he achieved third place overall in the 2017 Dakar Rally, thus managing to finish on the podium for the first time. He also managed to win the last stage of the rally. At the 2018 Dakar Rally, he made his last appearance on a motorcycle in that event. At the 2019 Dakar Rally, he switched to the UTV category and together with Daniel Oliveras, he won the 3rd stage and finished the event in second place in the general classification. At the 2020 Dakar Rally, he finished in 11th place with three stage wins.
