= Kamaz Master =

Russian motorsport team

(Russia) Kamaz Master
- Founded: July 17, 1988
- Current series: Dakar Rally; Silk Way Rally
- Current drivers: (Russia) Dmitry Sotnikov (Russia) Eduard Nikolaev (Russia) Anton Shibalov (Russia) Andrey Karginov
- Drivers' Championships: 19
- Website: https://kamazmaster.ru/en

Kamaz Master is a Russian motorsport team founded in 1988, using and promoting KAMAZ trucks.

It is a long-time winner and medallist of different motorsport competitions for many years such as the Dakar Rally, Silk Way Rally and Africa Eco Race.

Kamaz vehicles have won the truck category of the Dakar Rally 19 times as of 2022.

After the Russian Invasion of Ukraine, Kamaz Master was unable to participate in the 2023 Dakar Rally after failing to sign documents in relation to the 2022 ban of Russian and Belarusian teams and competitions. They continued to compete nationally in events such as the Silk Way Rally, and returned to international competition at the 2026 Taklimakan Rally.

== Gallery ==
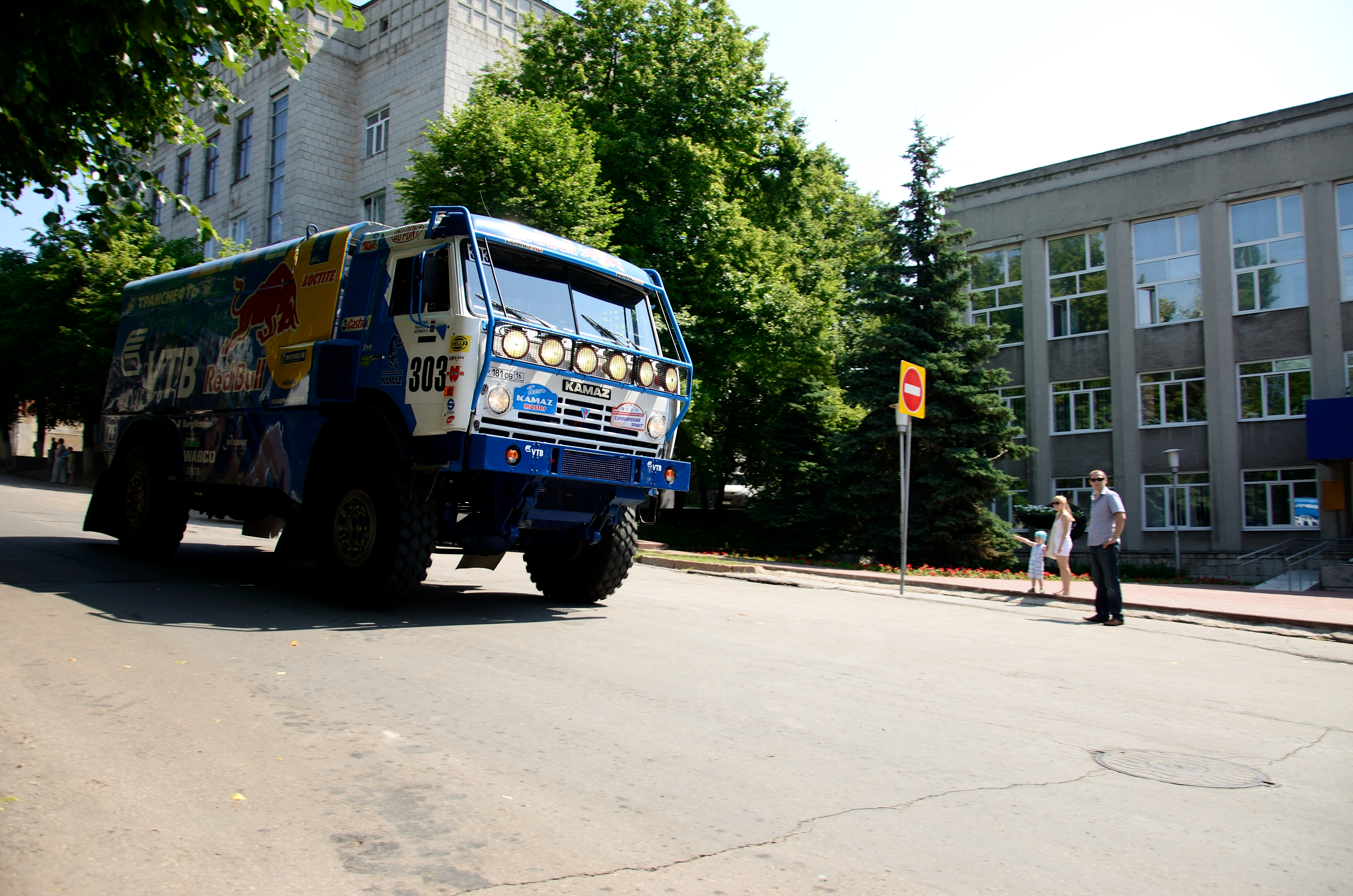

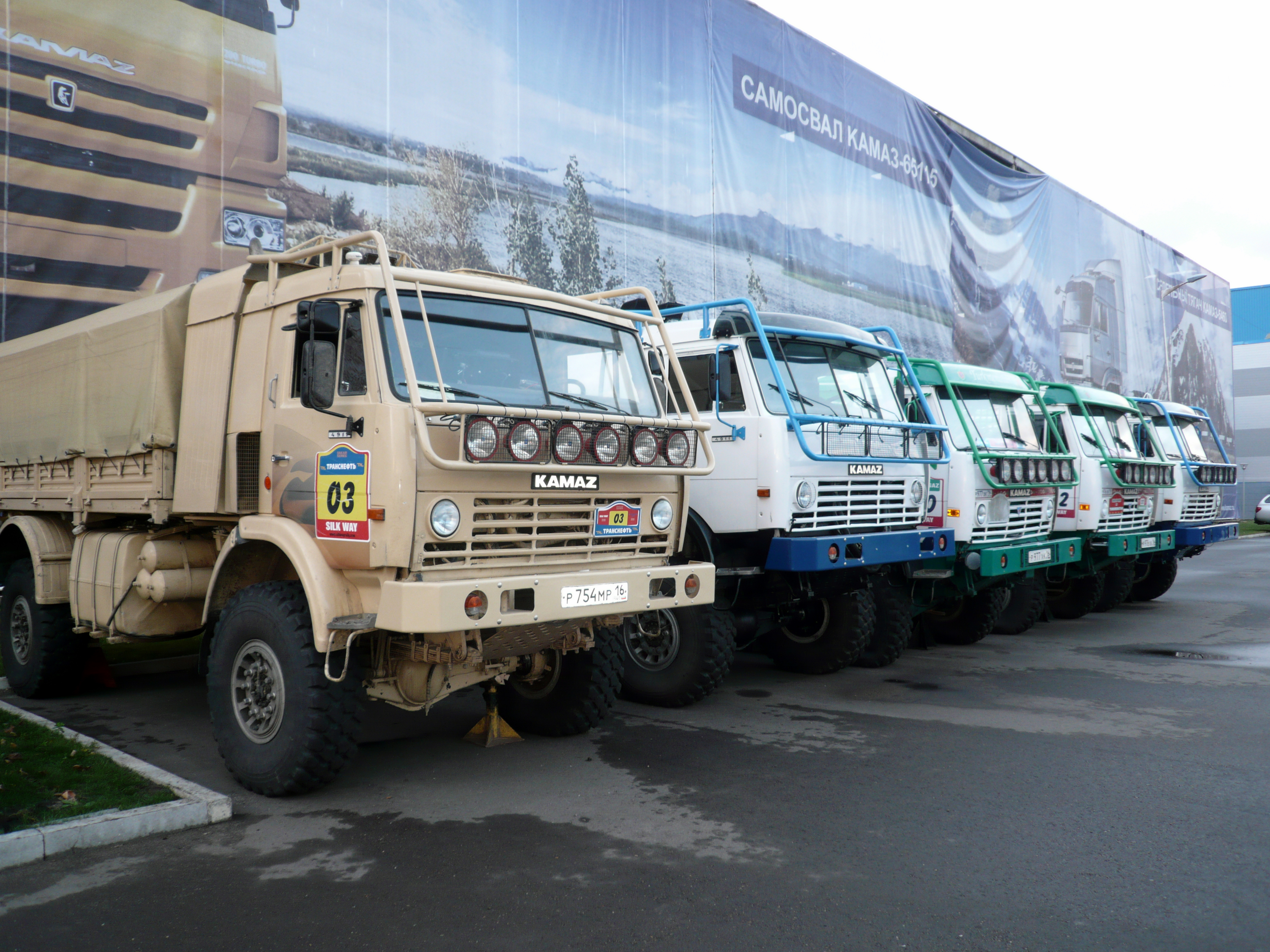
Racing trucks of the KAMAZ Master team in different versions

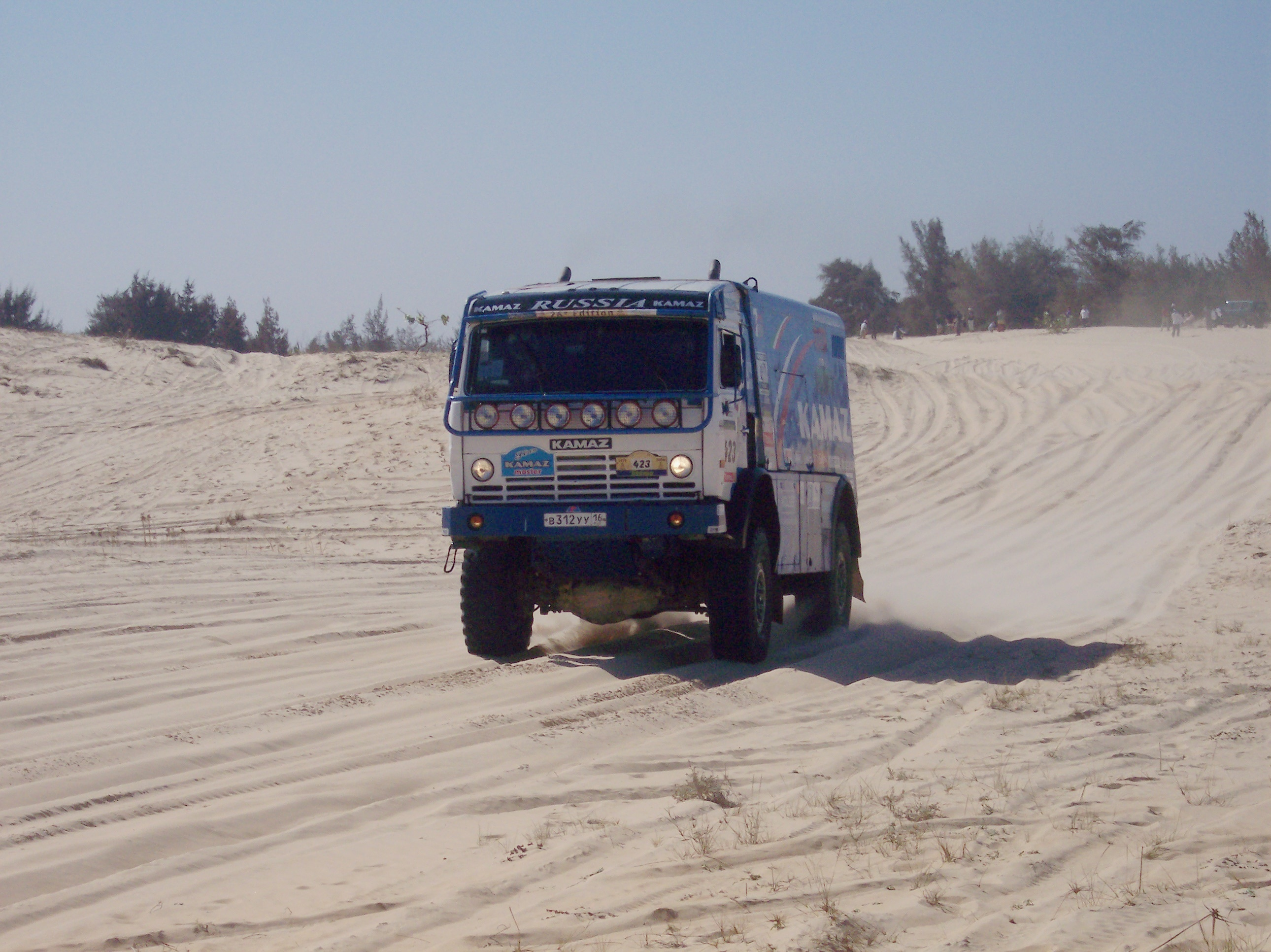

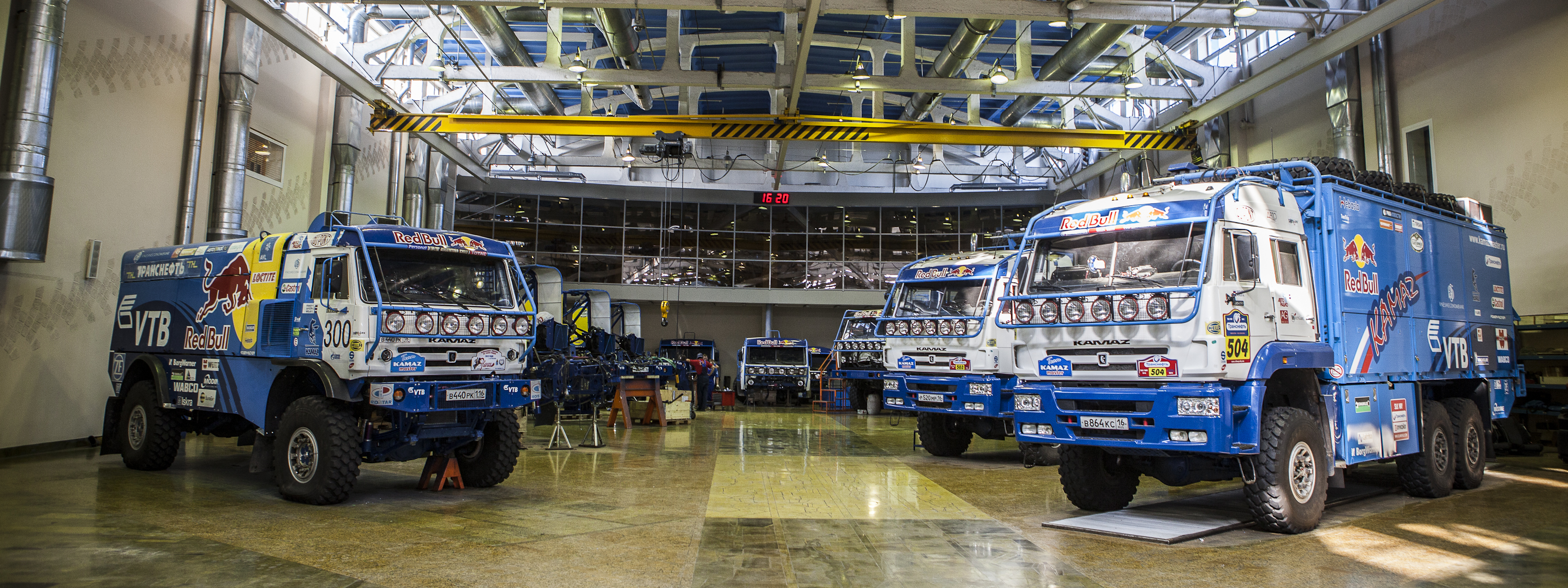

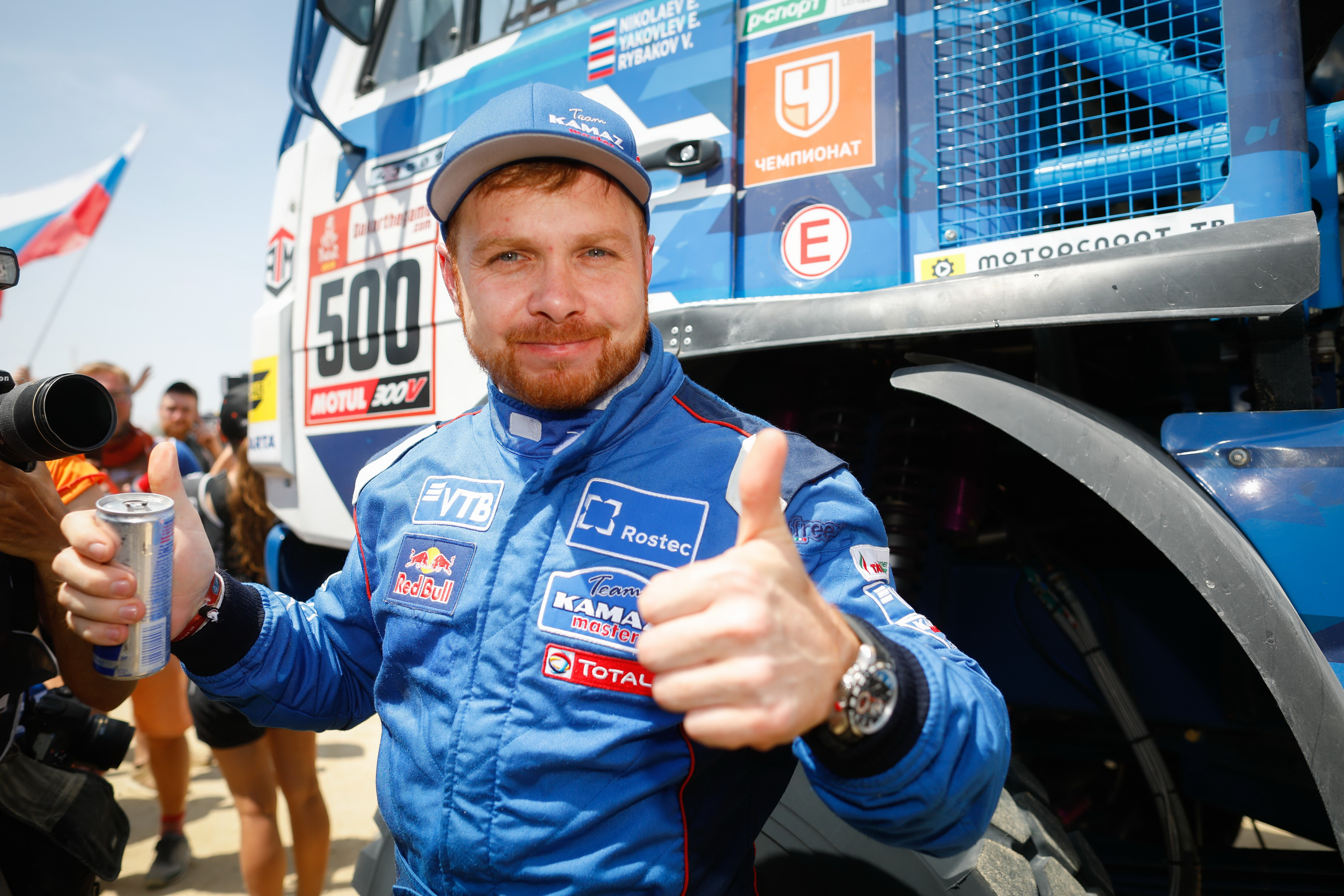

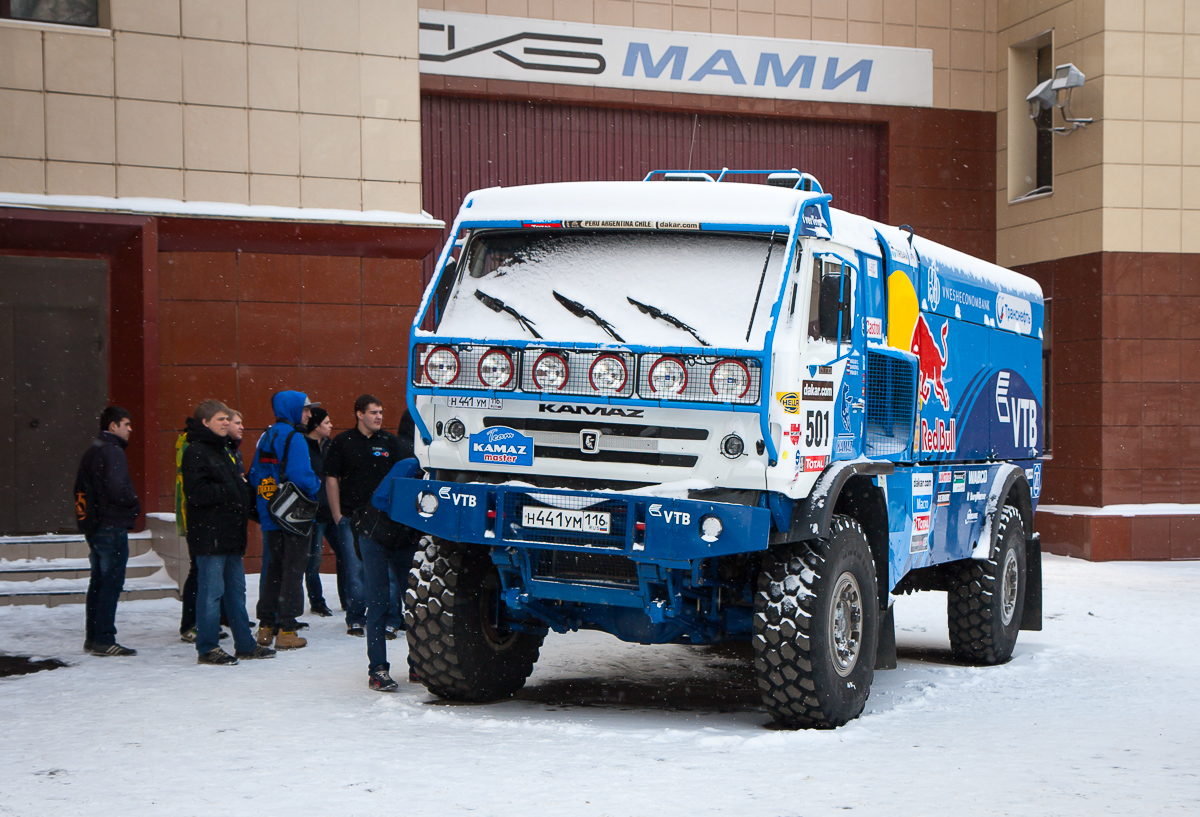

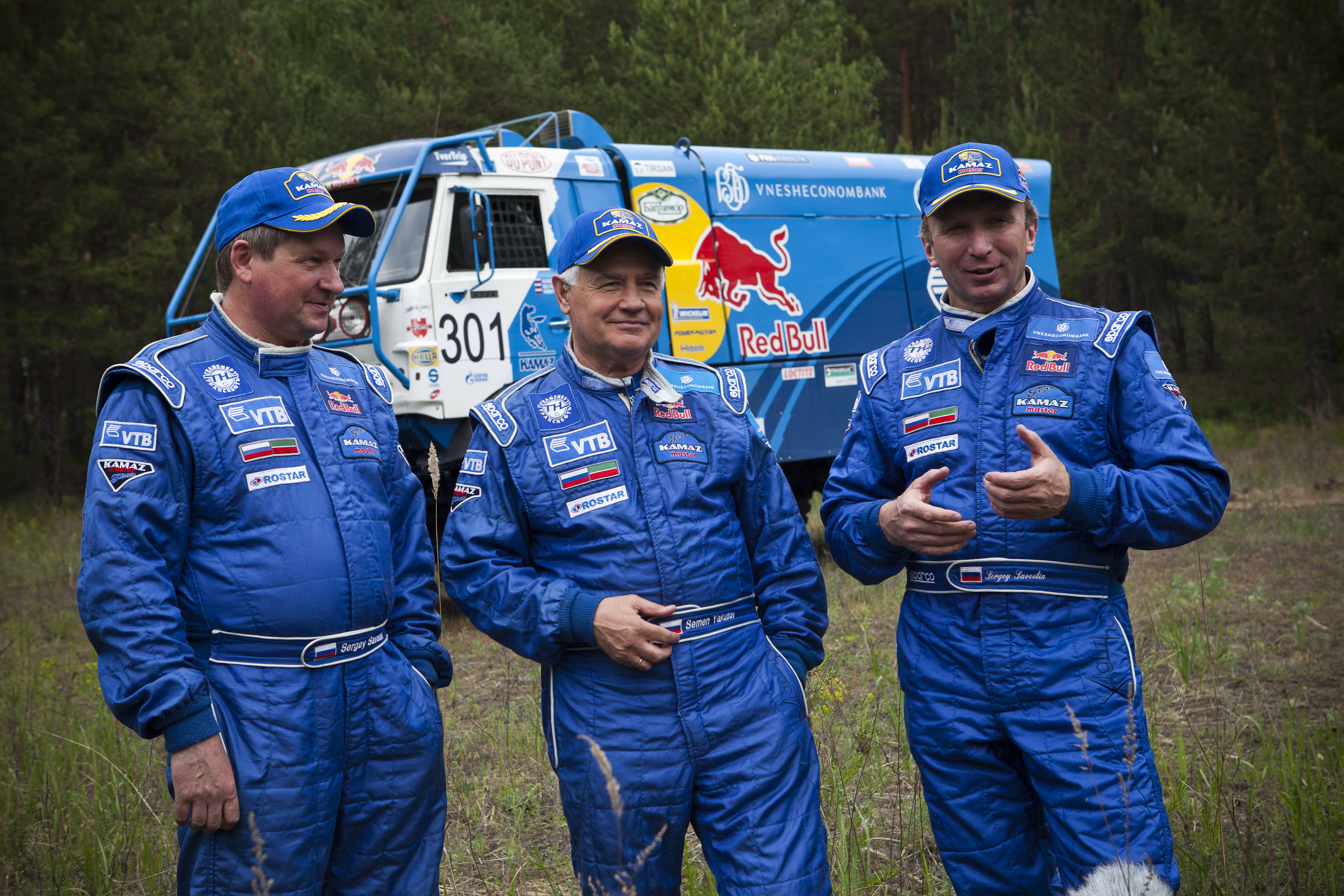

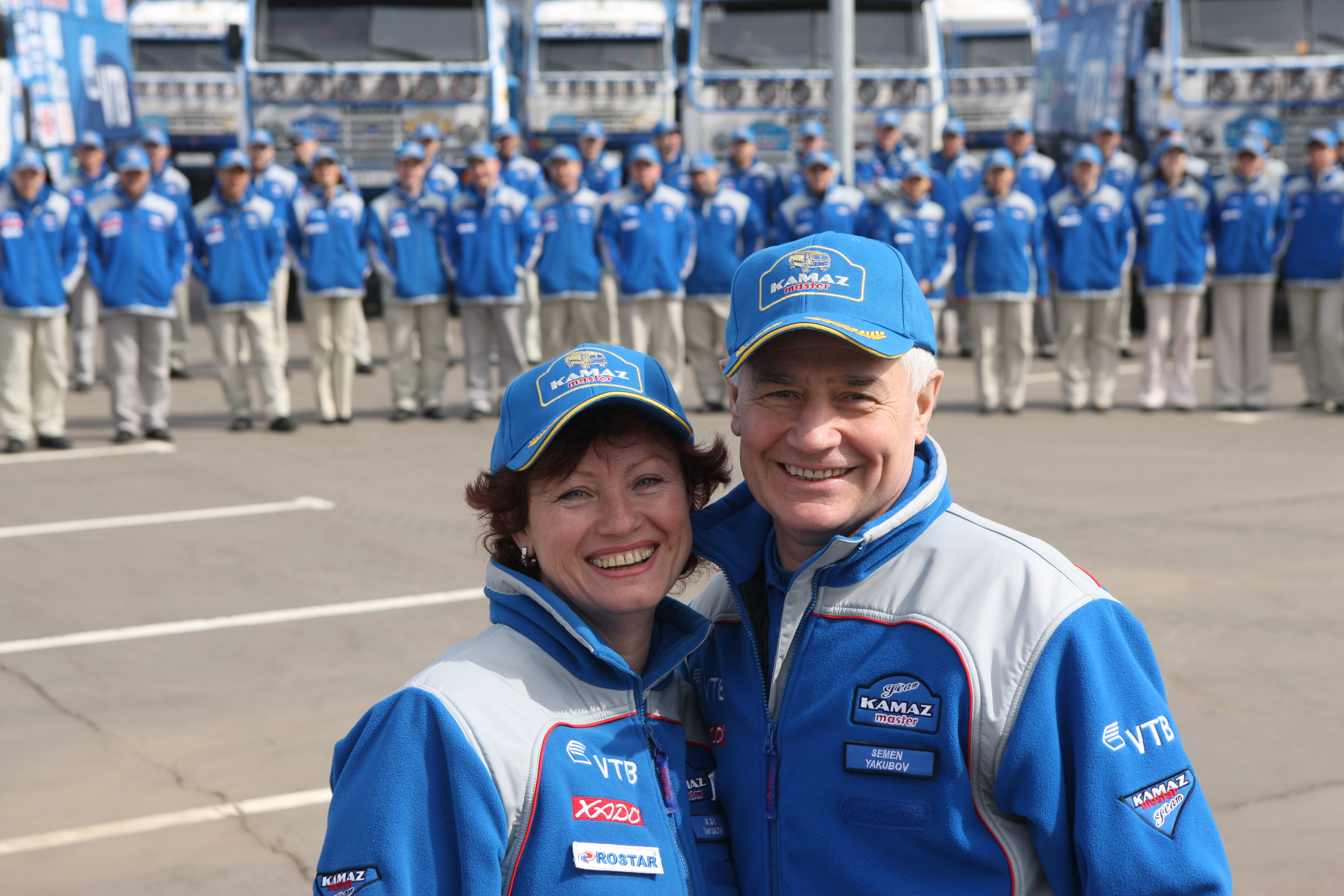

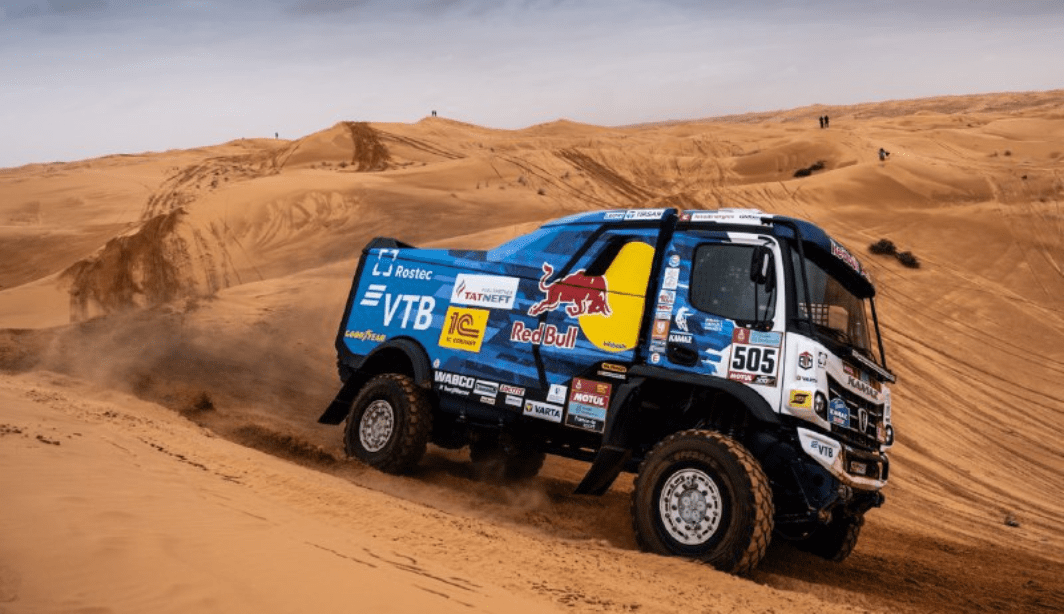
KAMAZ-Master on the track of the Dakar-2022 rally
