= Mini John Cooper Works Rally =

Off-road competition car

Overview
- Manufacturer: BMW (Mini)
- Production: 2016–2018

Body and chassis
- Class: Rally raid
- Body style: 3-door SUV
- Layout: F4 Layout

Powertrain
- Engine: 3.0 L B57 I6 turbo (diesel)
- Transmission: 6-speed dual-clutch

Dimensions
- Wheelbase: 2,900 mm (114.2 in)
- Length: 4,332 mm (170.6 in)
- Width: 1,999 mm (78.7 in)
- Height: 2,000 mm (78.7 in)
- Kerb weight: 1,952.5 kg (4,304.5 lb)

Chronology
- Predecessor: Mini All4 Racing
- Successor: Mini John Cooper Works Buggy

The Mini John Cooper Works Rally is an off-road competition car based on the Mini Countryman, which is built and used by the German racing team X-Raid around team manager Sven Quandt. The John Cooper Works Rally was first used in the 2017 Dakar Rally.

== Competition history ==
In its first outing, the 2017 Dakar Rally, the X-raid MINI John Cooper Works Rally Team started with the following driver pairings:

- Mikko Hirvonen/Michel Perin – red MINI John Cooper Works Rally
- Yazeed Al-Rajhi/Timo Gottschalk – green MINI John Cooper Works Rally
- Orlando Terranova/Andreas Schulz – silver MINI John Cooper Works Rally

In 2018, Al-Rajhi and Gottschalk won the Silk Way Rally in the passenger car class with a John Cooper Works Rally. the same pair also won the Rally Kazakhstan in the same year.

== See also ==
- Mini
- Mini All4 Racing
- Mini Countryman
- Mini John Cooper Works WRC
- Mini All4 Racing
- X-raid
