= Benediktas Vanagas =

Lithuanian rally driver (born 1977)

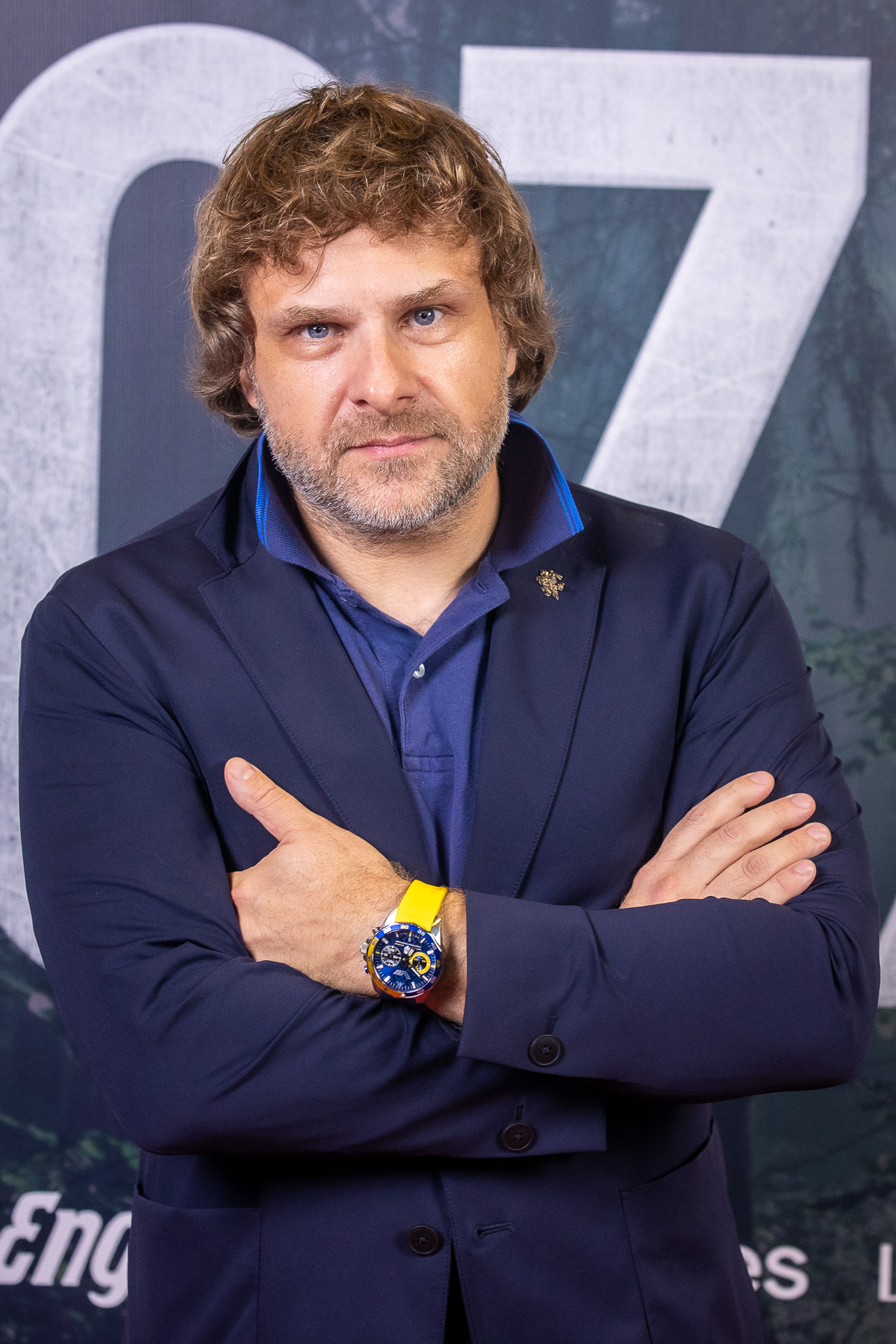
- Benediktas Vanagas

Personal information
- Nationality: (Lithuania) Lithuanian
- Born: 16 March 1977 (age 49) Vilnius, Lithuanian SSR, Soviet Union
- Years active: 2007-present
- Height: 173 cm (5 ft 8 in)
- Weight: 86 kg (190 lb)
- Spouse: Giedrė Vanagienė
- Website: benediktasvanagas.lt

Sport
- Country: Lithuania
- Sport: Classic rally, Rally raid
- Team: Gurtam Toyota Gazoo Racing Baltics

Benediktas Vanagas (born 16 March 1977) is a Lithuanian rally driver. Vanagas is one of the few racing drivers in the Baltic states who has achieved good results competing in various auto racing disciplines, such as rallying, rally raid racing, endurance racing and off-road competitions, though he most often competes as a rally driver. He is a member of the Gurtam Toyota Gazoo Racing Baltics. Vanagas still holds the record for the best overall result in a car class in the Baltics as well as for a Lithuanian driver. He is currently teamed with Estonian co-driver Kuldar Sikk.

== Achievements ==
- 2009 - Silk Way Rally: 5th place in class, 8th overall.
- 2009 - Ladoga Trophy: 2nd place in TR1 class, 3 Stages won.
- 2010 - Silk Way Rally: 2nd place in class, 7th overall, 1 Stage won.
- 2010 - Ladoga Trophy: 2nd place in TR1 class, 7 Stages won.
- 2012 - Rally Sweden: 4th place in N4 class.
- 2012 - Lithuania rally championship: 3rd place in N4, 2nd overall.
- 2012 - 1000 kilometers race: 2nd place in qualification.
- 2013 - Dakar Rally: 65th place overall.
- 2013 - 1000 kilometers race: 1st place overall.
- 2014 - Dakar Rally: 35th place overall.
- 2015 - Dakar Rally: 24th place overall and 1st place among private teams.
- 2015 - FIA European Cup for Cross-Country Bajas - Italian Baja: 6th place in the 1st group.
- 2015 - 1000 kilometers race: 6th place overall.
- 2016 - Dakar Rally: 26th place overall.
- 2016 - 1000 kilometers race: 1st place overall.
- 2017 - FIA Baltic Rally Trophy: 1st place overall.
- 2018 - Dakar Rally: 30th place overall.
- 2018 - Winter Rally: 1st place overall.
- 2019 - Dakar Rally: 11th place overall.
- 2019 - FIA World Baja Cup - Baja Russia - Northern Forest: 3rd place overall.
- 2019 - FIA World Baja Cup - Dubai International Baja: 5th place overall.
- 2020 - Dakar Rally: 15th place overall.
- 2021 - Dakar Rally: 12th place overall.
- 2021 - FIA European Cup for Cross-Country Bajas - Baja Poland: 3rd place overall.
- 2021 - FIA European Cup for Cross-Country Bajas - Italian Baja: 3rd place overall.
- 2022 - FIA European Cup for Cross-Country Bajas - XIX. HunGarian Baja: 1st place overall.
- 2024 - Dakar Rally: 8th place overall. (3rd place in Stage 10 - personal best).
- 2025 - FIA European Baja Cup - Italian Baja: 1st place overall.
- 2025 - FIA European Baja Cup - Baja España Aragón: 2nd place overall.
- 2025 - FIA European Baja Cup - Baja Poland: 2nd place overall.
- 2026 - FIA European Baja Cup - Italian Baja: 1st place overall.
- 2026 - FIA European Baja Cup - Baja Poland: 1st place overall.
- 2026 - FIA European Baja Cup - Baja España Aragón: 3rd place overall.
- 2026 - FIA European Baja Cup - HunGarian Baja: 3rd place overall.
- 2026 - FIA European Baja Cup: 3rd place overall.

== Dakar results ==
Vanagas has been a consistent performer on the Dakar since making his debut in 2013, reaching the finish line in all but three of his eleven participations.

Year	Class	Starting number	Navigator	Vehicle	Position
2013	Car	458	(Lithuania) Saulius Jurgelėnas	(Latvia) Oscar O3	65
2014	Car	373	(Belarus) Andrey Rudnitsky	(Latvia) Oscar O3 (aka BlackHawk I)	35
2015	Car	339	(Belarus) Andrey Rudnitsky	(Japan) Toyota Hilux Overdrive OTB (aka BlackHawk II)	24
2016	Car	333	(Poland) Sebastian Rozwadowski	(Japan) Toyota Hilux Overdrive OTB (aka BlackHawk II)	26
2017	Car	326	(Poland) Sebastian Rozwadowski	(Japan) Toyota Hilux Gazoo Racing IRS (aka BlackHawk III)	DNF (3/12)
2018	Car	323	(Poland) Sebastian Rozwadowski	(Japan) Toyota Hilux Gazoo Racing IRS (aka BlackHawk IV)	30
2019	Car	330	(Poland) Sebastian Rozwadowski	(Japan) Toyota Hilux Gazoo Racing IRS (aka BlackHawk V)	11
2020	Car	312	(Portugal) Filipe Palmeiro	(Japan) Toyota Hilux Gazoo Racing IRS (aka BlackHawk V)	15
2021	Car	320	(Portugal) Filipe Palmeiro	(Japan) Toyota Hilux Gazoo Racing IMA (aka BlackHawk VI)	12
2022	Car	219	(Portugal) Filipe Palmeiro	(Japan) Toyota Hilux Gazoo Racing IMA (aka BlackHawk VI.5)	DNF (4/12)
2023	Car	214	(Estonia) Kuldar Sikk	(Japan) Toyota Hilux Gazoo Racing DKR IMT (aka BlackHawk VII)	DNF (4/14)
2024	Car	223	(Estonia) Kuldar Sikk	(Japan) Toyota Hilux Gazoo Racing DKR IMT (aka BlackHawk VIII)	8
2025	Car	208	(Poland) Szymon Gospodarczyk	(Japan) Toyota Hilux Gazoo Racing DKR IMT EVO (aka BlackHawk VIII.5)	DNF (5/12)
2026	Car	216	(Lithuania) Aisvydas Paliukėnas	(Japan) Toyota Hilux Gazoo Racing DKR IMT EVO (aka BlackHawk VIII.5)	DNF (5/13)
2027	Car		(Lithuania) Aisvydas Paliukėnas	(Japan) Toyota Hilux Gazoo Racing DKR IMT EVO (aka BlackHawk IX)	
