= Bowler Motors =

English off-road racing vehicle builder

Bowler Motors Limited
- Type: Subsidiary
- Industry: Automotive
- Founded: 1985; 41 years ago
- Founder: Andrew Bowler
- Headquarters: Belper, Derbyshire, England, United Kingdom
- Products: Off-road vehicles
- Parent: Jaguar Land Rover
- Website: www.bowlermotors.com

Bowler Motors Limited is a manufacturer of off-road racing vehicles based on the Land Rover Defender and Range Rover chassis. The company is located in the town of Belper, Derbyshire, in the United Kingdom.

== Company ==
The company was founded by Andrew Bowler, who founded the company in 1985, after modifying a Land Rover Series I to drive competitively. After seeing considerable success, he started taking orders from others for similar vehicles. Bowler began his company with 8 people designing and building aftermarket parts and rally raid vehicles on the Bowler family farm in Derbyshire, United Kingdom. Bowler originally designed and produced the Bowler Tomcat which was sold and then the development of the Bowler Wildcat began. In December 2007 the manufacturing rights to the Wildcat were sold by Bowler to Qt Services, to provide support to existing Wildcat owners while Bowler concentrated on production of their newer vehicle, the Bowler Nemesis. In late 2009 the concept of the road version of the Bowler Nemesis was revealed.

Bowler has a long history of involvement with motorsports, with both company and private teams participating in the Dakar Rally, British Hill Climb Championship, French Baja, and many other extreme off-road events.

On 15 November 2016, all pages on Bowler's website were changed to a single page holding an official statement by the company, stating their founder, Drew Bowler, had suddenly died Monday, 14 November 2016. They said that his death "came as a huge shock to the company", but that they would "continue his vision".

Jaguar Land Rover acquired Bowler Off Road in December 2019. Bowler became part of Jaguar's Special Vehicle Operations division, and remains in operation in Belper, United Kingdom. Bowler continues to produce aftermarket parts and rally raid vehicles, primarily based on Land Rover Defender 90 and Defender 110 platforms. In November 2020, Bowler announced a new addition to their line-up known by its project name, Project CSP 575, a new SUV based upon the design of the Land Rover Defender 110 station wagon, powered by the 5.0 litre Jaguar AJ-V8 from the Range Rover Sport SVR.

== Financial Troubles ==
On 14 October 2024, staff working at Bowler were noticed to publicly denote themselves as being made redundant from the company. Their accounts showed a loss of over £6,000,000 from the last financial year, citing in their accounts that there was a going concern. However, Jaguar Land-Rover would be willing to cover monies due for the next 12 months.

Some staff announced the closure of the Belper site, stating that it would close within the "coming months".

== Concept Cars ==
- Bowler Raptor (2009)
- Bowler CSP RIV (2017) - this Rapid Intervention Vehicle was shown at the Defence and Security Equipment International (DSEI) arms fair.
