= Bowler Nemesis =

Bowler Nemesis / EXR
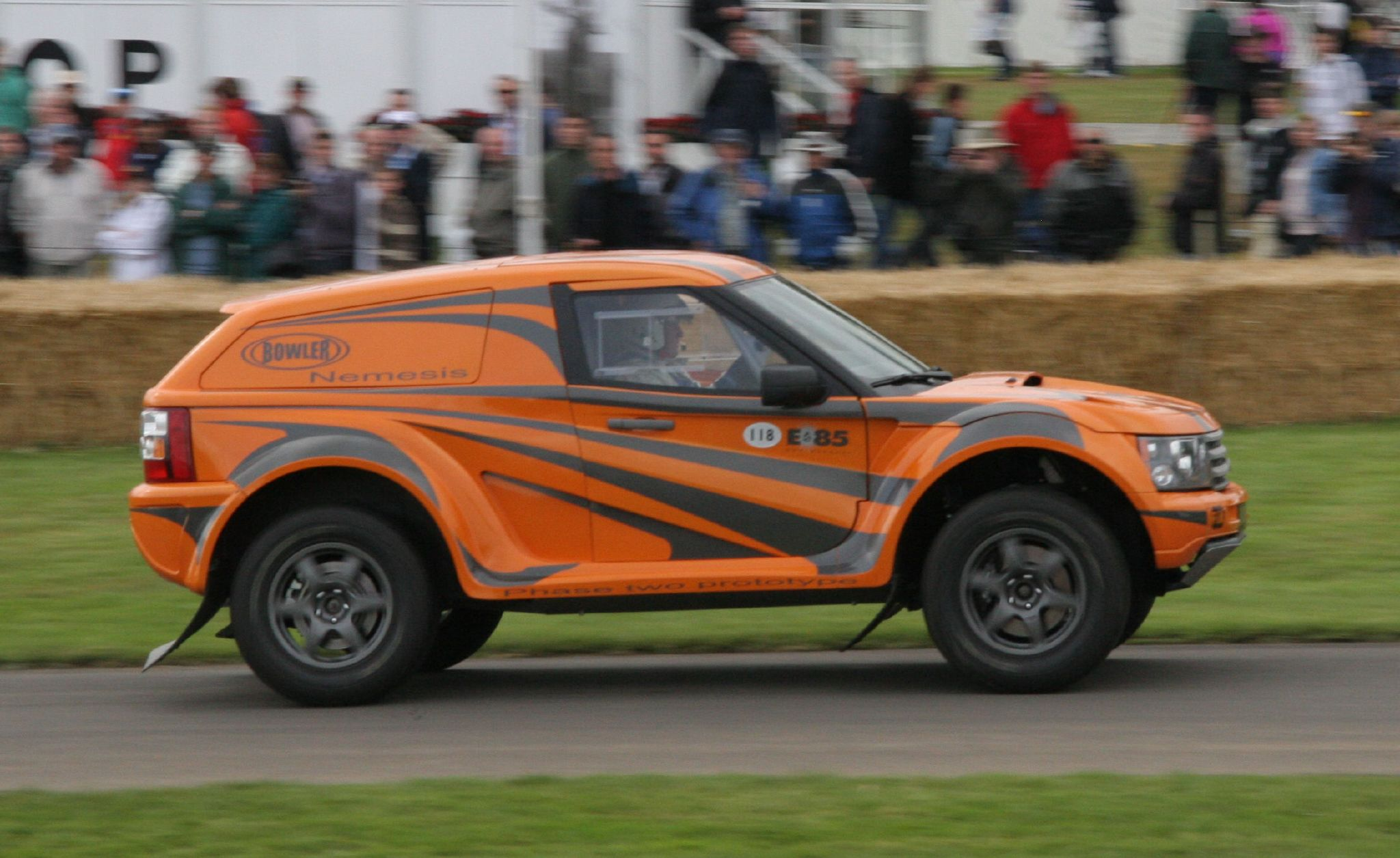

Overview
- Manufacturer: Bowler Off Road
- Also called: Bowler EXR
- Production: 2007

Body and chassis
- Layout: Front-engine, four-wheel-drive layout
- Related: Range Rover Sport

Chronology
- Predecessor: Bowler Wildcat

The Bowler Nemesis is an off-road racing vehicle designed, manufactured and sold by Bowler Off-Road. The Nemesis is intended to be used in endurance rally raid events such as the Dakar Rally and Rallye des Pharaons.

== Design and construction ==
The Nemesis takes styling elements such as grille, headlights, and rear lights from the Range Rover Sport. Like the Bowler Wildcat that preceded it, the Nemesis has a tubular steel spaceframe construction that incorporates a roll cage as an integral part of the frame structure. The spaceframe and roll cage are approved by the Motor Sports Association for racing. Unlike the Wildcat, the Nemesis features a fully independent suspension design.

Bowler offers the Nemesis with 4.0 or 4.4-litre displacement naturally aspirated V8 or a 4.2-litre displacement supercharged V8. A six-speed manual transmission is fitted as standard with the option of a dog-engagement racing transmission. The vehicle features a 60/40 torque split limited-slip center differential with over-lock and limited-slip front and rear differentials.

Body panels are made of a composite material called Twin-tex with some carbon fibre pieces in areas where higher strength is required.

The Nemesis has a 415-litre capacity racing fuel cell to allow the vehicle to run the longest Dakar Rally stages.

== Bowler EXR-S ==
Bowler also made a road-legal version of the EXR called the Bowler EXR-S. It has two engine choices, either a 5.0-litre supercharged V8 from the Jaguar XKR with up to 600 hp (447 kW; 608 PS) or a 3.0-litre turbocharged V6 diesel with 291 hp (217 kW; 295 PS).

== In popular culture ==
The Bowler EXR-S is featured in the mobile racing game Smash Bandits Racing as a tier 5 car, and in the Forza racing game franchise as an extreme off-road vehicle. It is also featured in racing games such as Colin McRae: Dirt 2, Dirt 3, and Blur as an off-road vehicle, and as a secret vehicle in the arcade racing game Sega Rally 3.
