= 2024 FIM Bajas World Cup =

2024 FIM Bajas World Cup
Previous:	2023	Next:	2025

The 2024 FIM Bajas World Cup season is the 13th season of the FIM Bajas World Cup, an international rally raid competition for motorbikes, quads and SSVs.

== Events ==
The 2024 FIM Bajas World Cup features a packed schedule with eight challenging rounds, mirroring the 2023 calendar but with minor adjustments. The season starts in Saudi Arabia in February and concludes in Jordan in late November. Key events include the Baja TT Dehesa Extremadura in Spain, the Hungarian Baja, and Middle Eastern stages in Qatar, Dubai, and Jordan. These locations showcase diverse terrains, from European forests to Middle Eastern deserts, offering competitors varied challenges.

New for 2024 is the introduction of the Trail category for motorcycles, requiring a minimum weight of 165 kg, two cylinders, and a top speed of 130 km/h. This class joins existing categories like the 450cc bikes, quads, and trophies for juniors, veterans, and women.

The FIM Bajas World Cup runs alongside FIA Baja Cups in certain stages, sharing routes and logistical arrangements. For instance, the Qatar International Baja combines FIM and FIA rounds, featuring a 504 km competitive distance for motorcycles and quads. Events like this emphasize coordination between organizations, enhancing the competition experience for participants and spectators.

The competition continues to attract top talent, with reigning champions like Mohammed Al-Balooshi in the 450cc category and Kevin Giroud in quads expected to defend their titles. Each event is structured for intense racing over two competitive days, typically spanning 350–500 km of timed stages, making it a true test of endurance and skills.
