= FIA Driver Categorisation =

International rating system for racing drivers

The FIA Driver Categorisation is a rating system created by the Fédération Internationale de l'Automobile (FIA) to classify racing drivers based on their age, skill, and track experience. It is used in sports car racing series such as the FIA World Endurance Championship (WEC) and the IMSA SportsCar Championship.

== Overview ==
Driver lineups in racing series that use the system are restricted with these categories to ensure competitive races. Occasionally, they are also used for safety; in the FIA WEC, bronze drivers are prohibited from participating in the fastest class, Le Mans Hypercar.

== History ==
Prior to 2015, driver classification systems varied across major racing organizations, including IMSA, WEC, and the FIA GT3 series. Each series maintained its own set of criteria and rating standards, leading to discrepancies when drivers competed across multiple championships. This often resulted in the same driver receiving different ratings depending on the series. To address these issues, the FIA implemented the current driver categorization system in 2015, aligning classification regulations across all FIA-sanctioned series. The regulations remained largely unchanged until the 2023 season where FIA altered regulations, resulting in many silver drivers being promoted to gold.

A similar system, called "priority drivers", exists for the World Rally-Raid Championship and FIA Baja Cups. Drivers with Gold status include Dakar Rally winners, W2RC titleholders and race winners, while Silver is for all points-earning drivers; a Platinum classification was previously used until June 2026 for Dakar and W2RC champs. Priority drivers differ from non-priority racers such as getting better stage starting spots and being required to submit data like tyre compositions and fuel samples.

== Categories ==
There are four categories that drivers can be placed into: bronze, silver, gold, and platinum. Drivers receive an initial rating determined by their age and experience, but it can improve when drivers meet certain requirements laid out by the FIA.

=== Bronze ===
Drivers are only assigned a bronze rating if they obtain their license for the first time at the age of thirty or older. This classification is usually reserved for gentleman drivers.

=== Silver ===
All drivers beginning their career before age thirty are placed in the silver category.

=== Gold ===
Drivers can be classified as gold-rated once they have achieved a win in a tier 3 series (FIA Formula 3 Championship, NASCAR Cup Series, Super GT, etc.) or placed top three in a tier 2 series (a National Touring Car Championship, National LMP3 Championship, National SRO GT4 Series, etc.).

=== Platinum ===
There are only four ways to achieve a platinum rating. Three of these involve season results in FIA championships, such as Formula 2 and Formula E. The fourth way a driver can become platinum is to win a major endurance race, such as the 24 Hours of Le Mans.

== Controversy ==
The categorisation system has faced scrutiny since its commencement in 2015. While designed to keep competition fair, there have been instances where drivers dominate the category into which they are placed. This has led to the creation of the term "Super Silver", used to describe skilled drivers who are still rated silver by the FIA due to technicalities in the regulations.
