= FIA Baja Cup =

The FIA Baja Cup is an umbrella of baja rally championships organised by the Fédération Internationale de l'Automobile.

It exists in three forms, each focusing on a different region:

- FIA World Baja Cup – Founded in 2002 with a global calendar. It was part of the FIA World Cup for Cross-Country Rallies from 2011 to 2018 before splitting into its own series.
- FIA European Baja Cup – Created in 2021 with races in Europe.
- FIA Middle East Baja Cup – Created in 2022, held in the Middle East.

World Baja Cup races are usually held in tandem with the European and Middle Eastern Cups, while the latter two have their own separate events. All three series also have combination rounds with the FIM Bajas World Cup.
