= Baja (cross-country rally) =

Type of cross-country rally for automobiles or off-road race for motorcycles

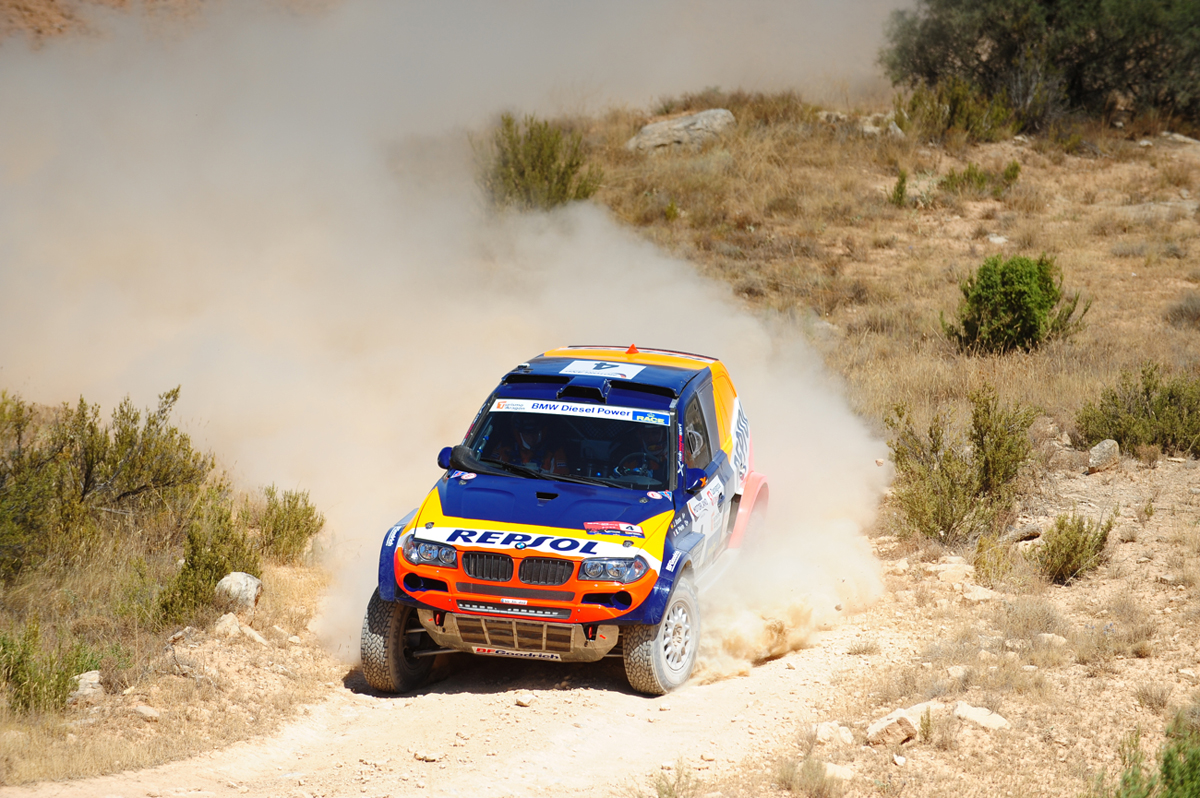
Nani Roma competing in Baja Aragón 2009

A baja, or baja rally, is a motorsport event conducted using various types of vehicles. Along with the similar rally raids and marathon rally raids, the three event types are collectively considered as types of cross-country rallies by the international governing body for automobile sport, the Fédération Internationale de l'Automobile (FIA).

In motorcycle sport, the Fédération Internationale de Motocyclisme (FIM) define baja as events featuring racing, however in practice, FIM motorcycle bajas are run similarly to other cross-country rallies. An unaffiliated motorcycle sport organisation, Baja Rally LLC, owns the "Baja Rally" trademark and organises a series of three events in Mexico without recognising any other sporting authority.

== Origin ==
Unlike rally raids, which have origins in cross-continental expeditions organised by Europeans, bajas have origins in the off-road races held on the Baja California peninsula of Mexico. These were first organised in the 1960s by National Off-Road Racing Association (NORRA), and later SCORE International, both organisations based in the United States which had no international governing body affiliation. These races held on open terrain do not fall within the FIA's regulations of motorsport, however since 2010, NORRA has been organising cross-country rally events within the FIA regulations, by using rally itineraries with competitive sections and liaisons.

== Characteristics ==
The route of a typical baja has a competitive length of 200 to 600 kilometres and the event can last from one to four days. Whereas as a marathon rally raid was historically a point-to-point event, bajas are more likely to be a loop.

Cross-Country Rally: [A] sporting event, the itinerary of which covers the territory of one or more countries. There are three types of Cross-Country Rallies: Marathon Rally-Raid, Rally-Raid and Baja.

Marathon Rally-Raid: Cross-Country Rally with minimum total distance for the Selective Sections of 2,500 km.

Rally-Raid: Cross-Country Rally that must last no more than seven days (including administrative checks and scrutineering) with five days of competition and a total distance for the Selective Sections of at least 1,200 km.

Baja: Cross-Country Rally that must last no more than four days (including administrative checks, scrutineering, and Prologue), with two days of competition and a total distance for the Selective Sections of at least 350 km. A Regional Cup Baja must have a total distance for the Selective Sections of at least 200 km.

— 2026 FIA Cross-Country Rally Sporting Regulations, Articles 2 (Definitions) and 6 (Rallies Characteristics)

== Events and cups ==
The Baja Aragón is an example of a cross-country baja with the Baja Russia Northern Forest taking place entirely in snow.

The FIA organise the World Baja Cup, European Baja Cup and Middle East Baja Cup. The regulations are similar to the FIA Rally Raid cups and championships, however Group T5 trucks cannot score in the FIA baja cups.

FIM award titles in the Bajas World Cup, which features the same events as appears in the calendars of the FIA cups.

== Vehicles ==
Similar to in rally raid, FIA baja cups permit vehicles from Groups T1 to T4, however individual events may permit more categories of vehicles, such as dune buggies, all terrain vehicles etc. Group T5 trucks that historically serviced other competing vehicles on marathon rally raids are not permitted.

=== Cars ===
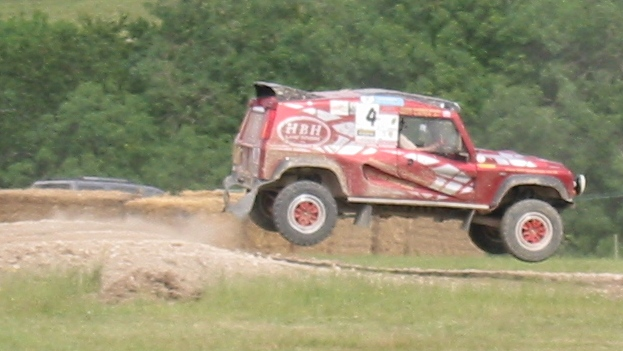
Bowler Wildcat rally-raid vehicle

Cars are vehicles weighing less than 3,500 kg (7,716 lb) and subdivided into several classes. Group T1 is made up of Prototype Cross-Country Cars and is subdivided into four primary classes: T1.U, T1.1, T1.2, and T1.3. T1.U (T1 Ultimate) is a recent category built exclusively for vehicles running on renewable energies; such as the Audi RS Q e-tron. T1.1 (4x4) and T1.2 (4x2) are open to vehicles running on petrol and diesel fuels; including the Mini John Cooper Works Buggy, Toyota Hilux, and Peugeot 3008 DKR. Subclass T1.3 is open to vehicles conforming to SCORE regulations. This includes the Hummer H3 buggy and various other buggies.

Group T2 is open to Series Production Cross-Country Cars; primarily the Toyota Land Cruiser and Nissan Patrol.

Other prominent examples in the Car Class included the Mitsubishi Pajero/Montero, the Volkswagen Race Touareg, the Bowler Wildcat 200, the Mini All4 Racing and the Nissan Navara.

=== Lightweight and SSV ===
While originally a sub-class under the car category and later a combined class; the T3 and T4 classes have been recently separated into their own respective categories.

Group T3 vehicles are officially described as Lightweight Prototype Cross-Country Vehicles and can include purpose-built machines such as the Red Bull OT3 and PH-Sport Zephyr while also allowing modified variations of vehicles built and sold by Polaris, Kawasaki, Yamaha, and Can-Am. Group T4 is for Modified Production Cross-Country Side-by-Side (SSV) vehicles; such as those built by Polaris and Can-Am, but built closer to production standards.

Both categories must weigh no more than 3500 kg and are eligible for their own respective FIA World Cups.

== See also ==
- Cross-country rallying
- Rally raid
- FIA
- FIM
- SCORE International
- NORRA
- Baja 1000
