= SC Group =

British company

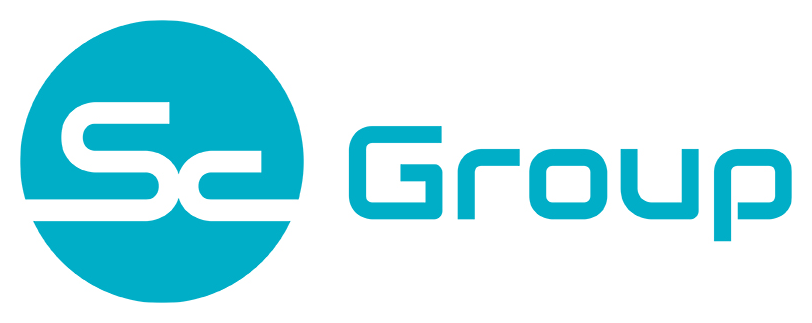
SC Group logo.

SC Group is a British manufacturer of military vehicles and related equipment. It was known as Supacat Ltd until 2015. Supacat was established in 1981 and based at Dunkeswell Aerodrome in England. SC Group now comprises four companies: Supacat, SC Innovation, Proteum and Blackhill Engineering.

SC Group initially specialised in the design and development of military and civil high mobility vehicles. Throughout the last decade the company expanded its portfolio considerably to encompass developing equipment for operation in harsh environments in sectors including marine, renewables, mineral exploration, oil & gas and nuclear power. During 2014, the then Supacat made a series of acquisitions in the commercial marine sector leading to the creation of the now Proteum based in Hamble, UK. At the end of 2014, Exeter-based heavy fabrication specialist, Blackhill Engineering, was acquired.

The current CEO is Nick Ames, who joined the company in 2003. Nick Jones, original co-founder of Supacat, remains a Director of SC Group.

== Supacat ==
The Supacat brand is retained by SC Group for the group's core defence business. Supacat develops and supports high mobility military vehicles and provides specialist engineering services for defence customers. It is a member of Rheinmetall's Challenger 2 Life Extension Project (C2 LEP) team.

=== All Terrain Mobility Platform ===
The All Terrain Mobility Platform (ATMP) is a 6x6 marginal terrain vehicle now in its fourth generation. Around 200 ATMPs have been supplied to mainly military users since 1982, including the armed forces of Canada, Malaysia, Mexico and the UK.

=== High Mobility Transporter ===
The High Mobility Transporter (HMT) vehicle platform is produced in three variants the HMT 400 (4x4), the HMT 600 (6x6) and the HMT Extenda (configurable between 4x4 and 6x6). A HMT 800 (8x8) variant is also available. The HMT was designed in mid-1999 by HMT Supacat Limited later renamed to HMT Vehicles Limited. In 2004, Lockheed Martin entered into a licence agreement with HMT Vehicles Ltd to manufacture and sell the HMT in North America. In 2006, Lockheed Martin (UK) acquired HMT Vehicles Ltd who licensed the design back to Supacat.

The HMT 400, the first of the platform to enter service, was developed for the United Kingdom Special Forces procured under Project Minacity to replace the Land Rover 110 Desert Patrol Vehicle. A contract was awarded in 2001 for 65 vehicles that entered service in 2003–2004 in Afghanistan following tenders in the late 1990s. In 2004, the U.S. Army Delta Force purchased 47 similarly configured vehicles designated Marauders which were delivered in 2004–2005.

In 2006, Danish Army Hunter Corps ordered 15 HMT Extenda vehicles. In 2007, the Australian Army Special Air Service Regiment ordered 31 HMT Extenda vehicles known as Nary designated as the Special Operations Vehicle-Special Reconnaissance (SOV-SR) which due to technical problems did not enter service until 2011.

In 2014, the Australian Army 2nd Commando Regiment ordered 89 HMT Extenda MK2 vehicles known as the Special Operations Vehicle-Commando (SOV-Cdo) that will be reconfigurable in four configurations. In 2015, the Norwegian Army Forsvarets Spesialkommando ordered an undisclosed number of HMT Extenda vehicles to be delivered from 2017 to 2019. In 2016, the New Zealand Special Air Service ordered an undisclosed number of HMT Extenda vehicles designated as the Special Operations Vehicles – Mobility Heavy (SOV-MH) to be delivered from late 2017.

The British Army is the biggest user of the HMT with purchases between June 2007 and late 2010 of the HMT 400 designated as the Jackal and HMT 600 designated as the Coyote totalling 575 vehicles.

The British Army has also developed specialist variants of the HMT. Two projects, named Project Soothsayer and the Lightweight Mobile Artillery Weapon System (LIMAWS), based on armoured 6x4 variants of the HMT platform, were cancelled in 2007. Supacat's HMT 600 is the chosen ground station platform for the UK MoD's Watchkeeper unmanned air vehicle (UAV) project.

==== HMT operators ====
- Australia: 31 HMT Extenda MK1 Special Operations Vehicle–Special Reconnaissance (SOV–SR), known as the Nary, used by the Special Air Service Regiment (SASR). 89 HMT Extenda MK2 Special Operations Vehicle–Commando (SOV–Cdo) on order for the 2nd Commando Regiment (2 Cdo Regt), including several SOV–Logistics variants for use by SASR and 2 Cdo Regt. In 2023, 14 HMT Extenda MK2s were donated to Ukraine.
- Czech Republic: 24 HMT400s ordered in 2023 for use with 601st Special Forces Group.
- Denmark: 15 HMT Extenda (MK1) used by Jaeger Corps (Danish: Jægerkorpset).
- Estonia: HMT 600 order placed by Estonian Defence Forces for unknown number. Four HMT 400 on loan from United Kingdom in interim.
- New Zealand: HMT Extenda (MK2) in service with New Zealand Special Air Service from a contract worth up to NZ$14.4 million.
- Norway: 24 HMT Extenda (MK2) used by the Forsvarets Spesialkommando. The first vehicle delivered under the £23 million contract was received in 2018.
- Ukraine: HMT600 Wolfram, Brimstone (missile) platform. Also used as a platform to launch ASRAAMs. In 2023, 14 HMT Extenda Mk2s were donated from Australia which were first seen in use by the Armed Forces of Ukraine in March 2024.
- United Kingdom: >573 (HMT 4x4, inc. 72 HMT 400) consisting of 65 (from 2003) + 7 (2006) Minacity, 242 Jackal 1 (2007-2009), 119 Jackal 2 (2009-2010) and >140 Jackal 2a (2010). Also delivered were 76 (HMT 6x6) TSV-L Coyote (2009-2010) and 35 HMT 600 (6x6) Soothsayer platforms, most of which are being re-roled. UK MoD to retain 400 Jackal and 71 Coyote post-Afghanistan.
- United States: 47 HMT 400 used by 1st Special Forces Operational Detachment–Delta, designated Marauders.

==== Failed bids ====
- Canada: A bid was submitted by Supacat to the Canadian Special Operations Forces Command to replace their High Mobility Multipurpose Wheeled Vehicle (HMMWV). In 2010, the Project was cancelled, after the HMT was the only vehicle that was bid, and it was determined that it did not meet all of CANSOFCOM requirements.

=== Supacat Protected Vehicle 400 ===
The Supacat Protected Vehicle 400 (SPV 400) is a protected light 4x4 vehicle featuring a V-shaped steel chassis hull onto which is fitted a Composite armour crew pod shown at Eurosatory 2012.

=== Light Armoured Multipurpose Vehicle ===
The Light Armoured Multipurpose Vehicle (LAMV) was developed with technical input from Supacat and was shown in February 2014 by the Indian company of Tata.

=== Light Reconnaissance Vehicle 400 ===
The Light Reconnaissance Vehicle 400 (LRV 400) MK2 is an open lightweight 4x4 vehicle based on the Land Rover Discovery platform which can be transported internally in a Boeing CH-47 Chinook helicopter shown at DSEi 2015. A 6x6 variant has also been designed similar to the HMT Extenda. Supacat is offering the LRV 400 for the Dutch Army Defence-wide Wheeled Vehicle Replacement Programme (DVOW).

=== Bombardier Lynx Snowmobile ===
The Royal Marines 3 Commando Brigade's Surveillance and Reconnaissance Squadron (SRS) Oversnow Reconnaissance Vehicle (ORV) is Bombardier Lynx snowmobile which has been modified for military use by Supacat.

=== Wolfram Armoured Vehicle ===
The Brimstone HMT Overwatch was created in 2022 to provide a launch system for the anti tank Brimstone (missile) system specifically for use by Ukraine. Using an extended 6x6 HMT 600 chassis, it was later given the code name Brimstone.

== Gallery ==
Supacat products

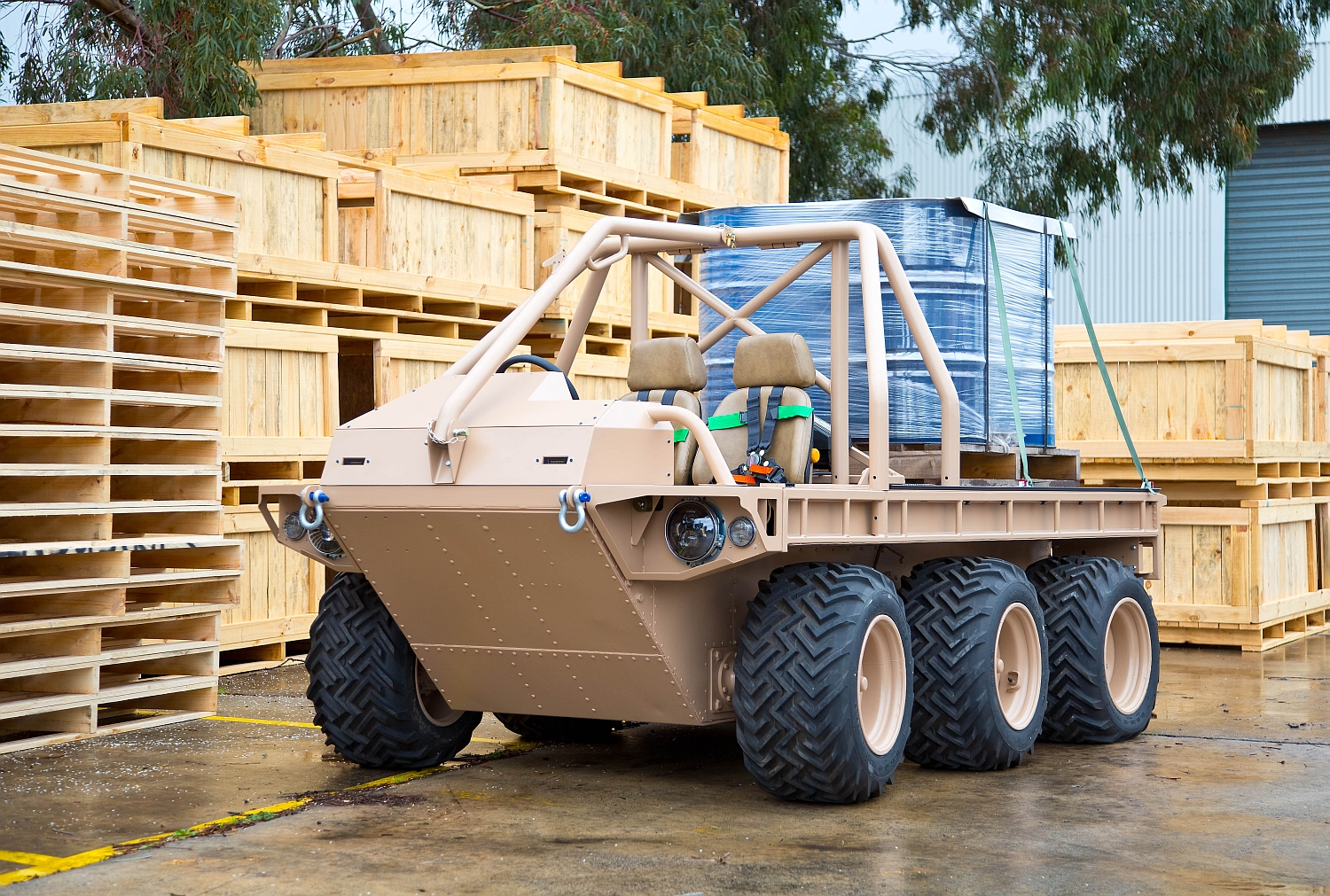
Prototype example of the Supacat All Terrain Mobility Platform (ATMP) Mk4.

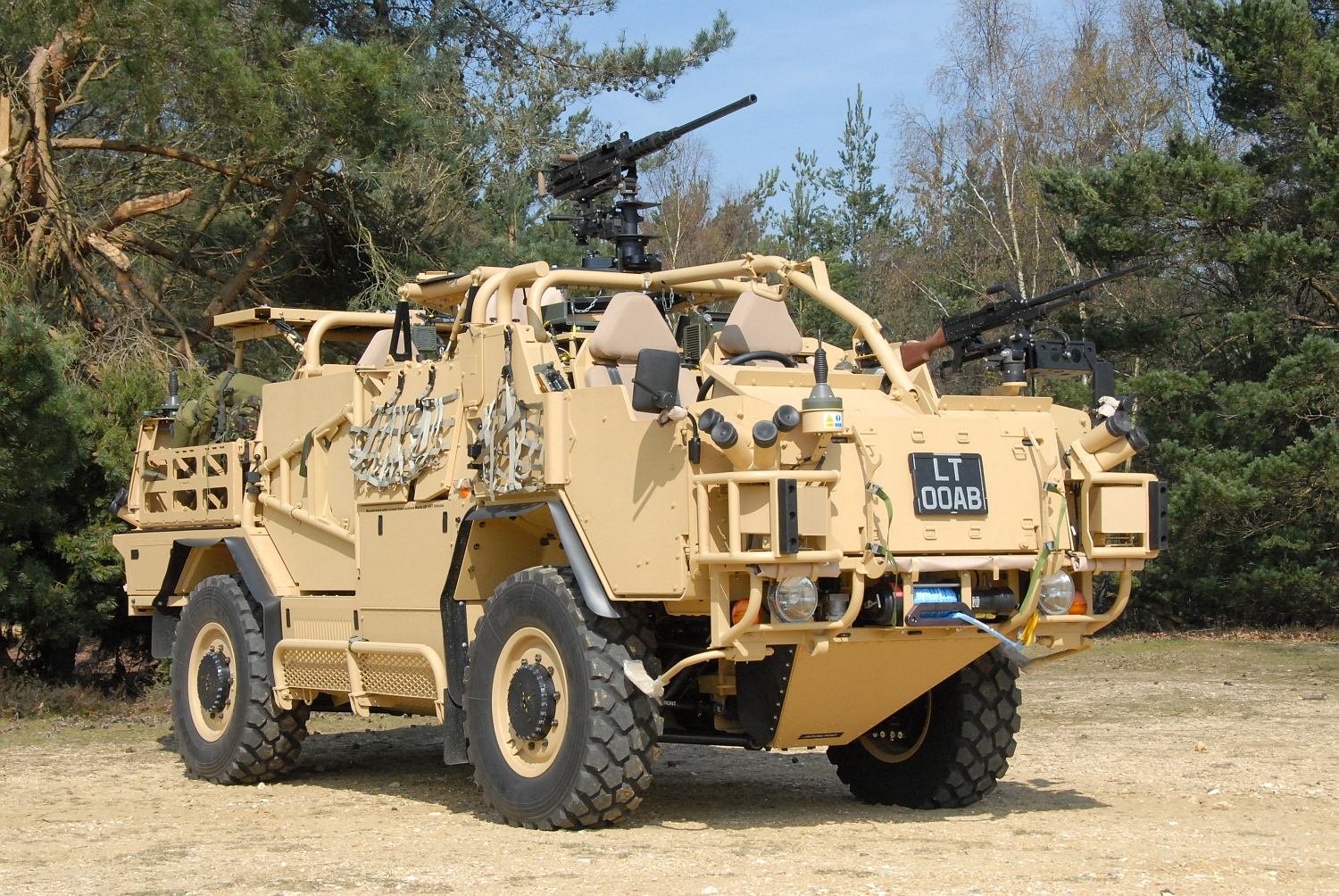
Supacat Jackal 2 at a media demonstration at Long Valley.

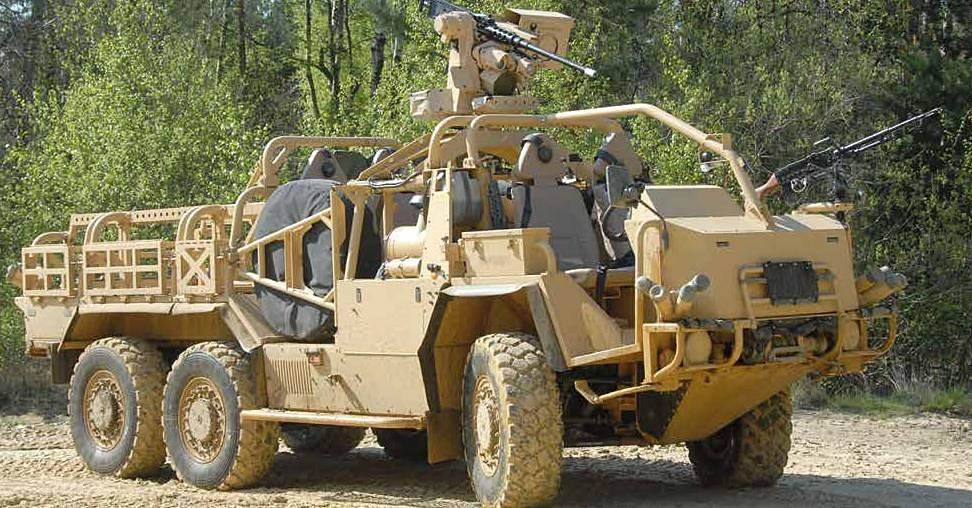
Supacat HMT Extenda at a media demonstration at Long Valley.

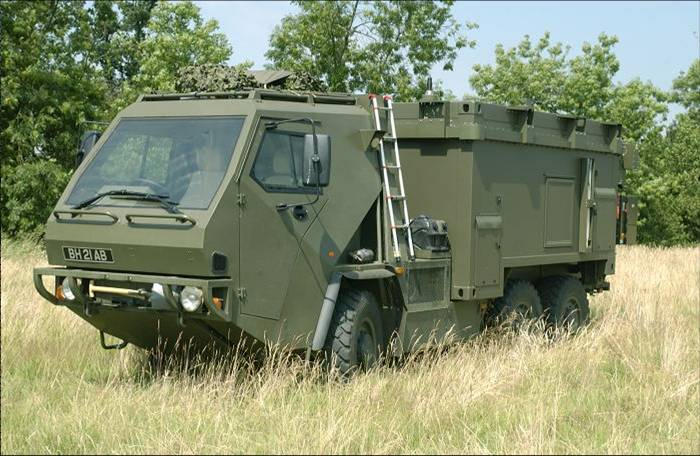
Supacat HMT 600 with four-seat cab and communications rear body.

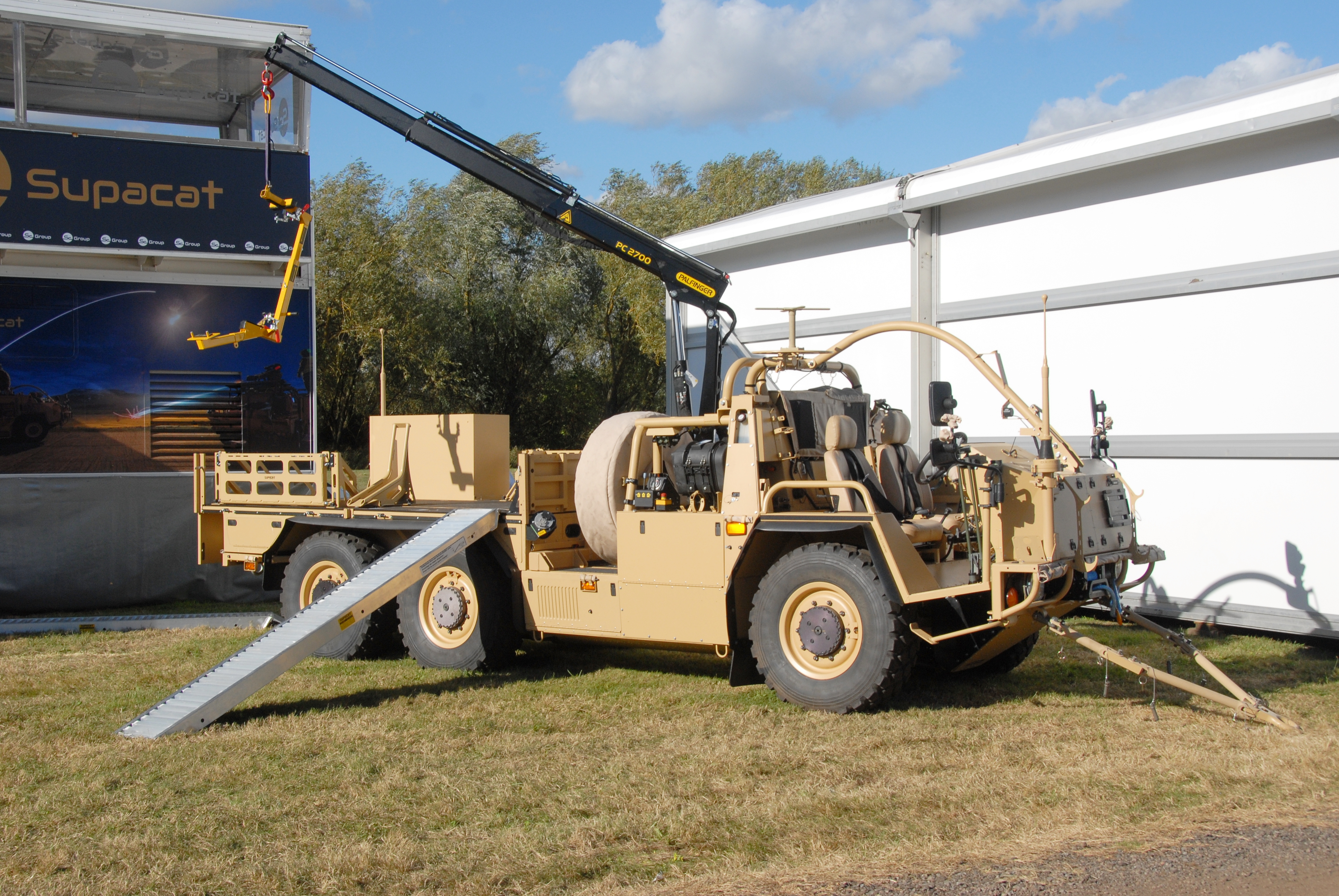
Supacat's HMT logistic variant concept as shown at DVD 2016

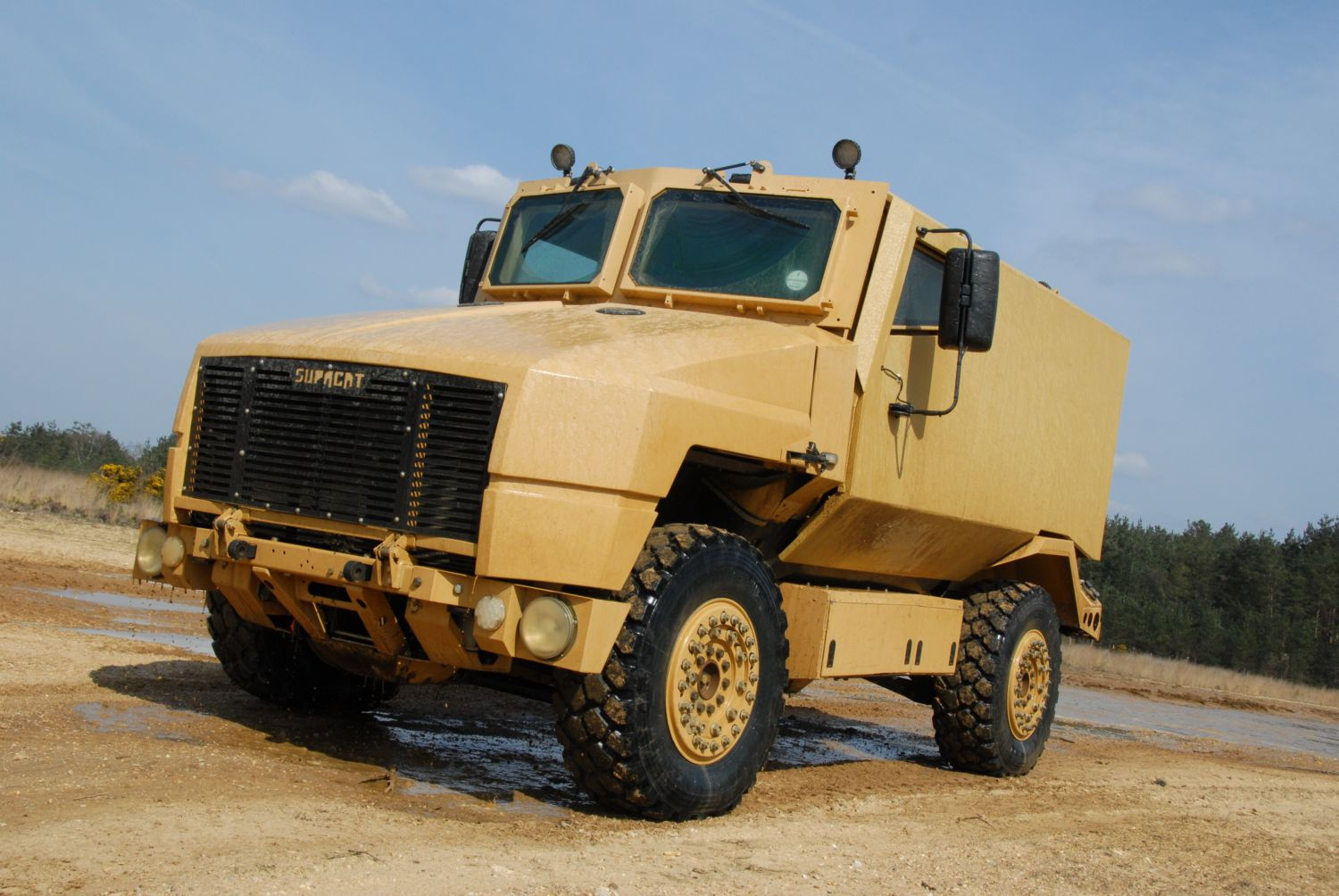
Prototype example of the SPV 400 at a media demonstration in the UK at Long Valley.

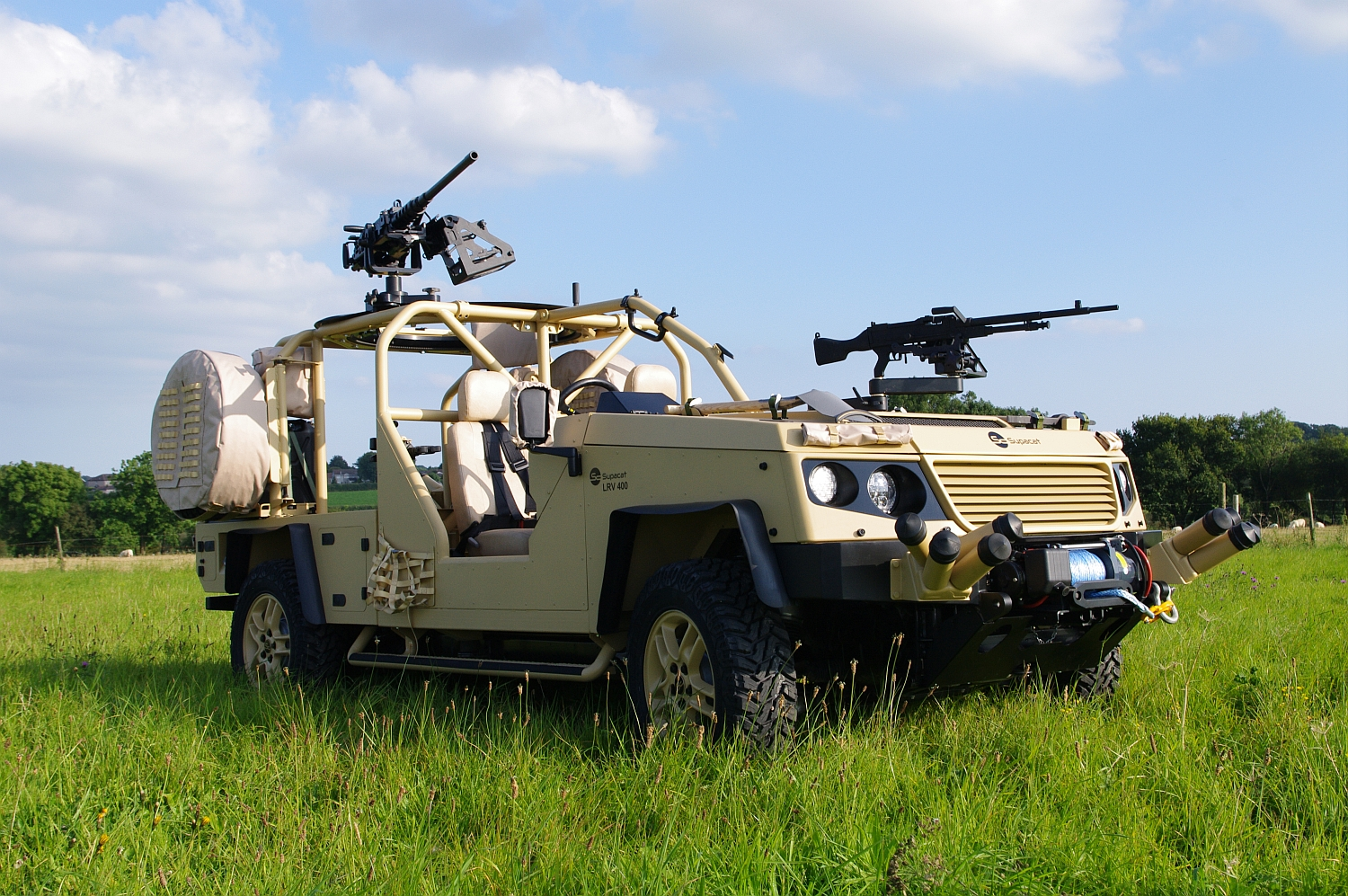
Light Reconnaissance Vehicle 400 (LRV 400) Mk2

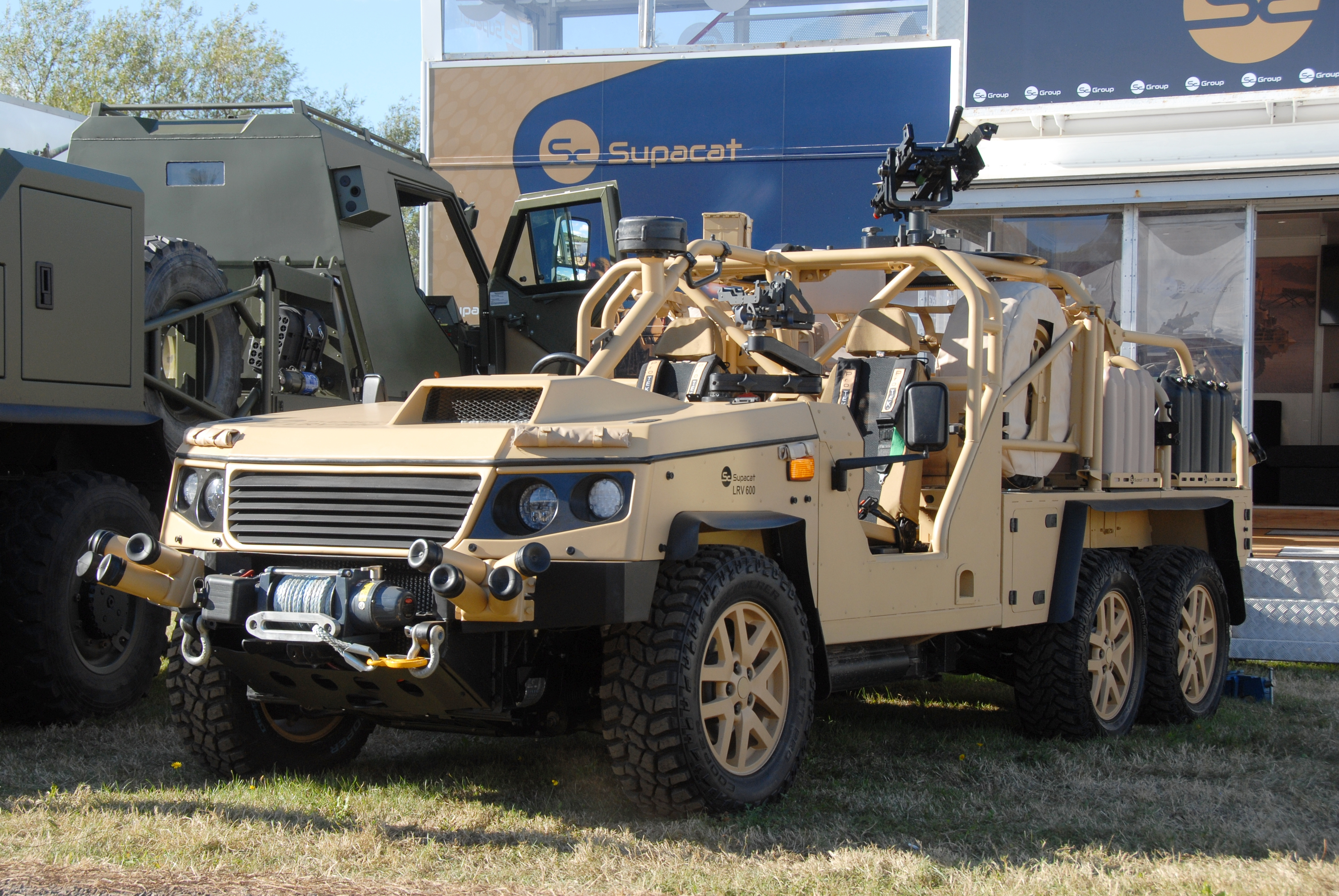
Supacat's LRV 600 concept as shown at DVD 2016

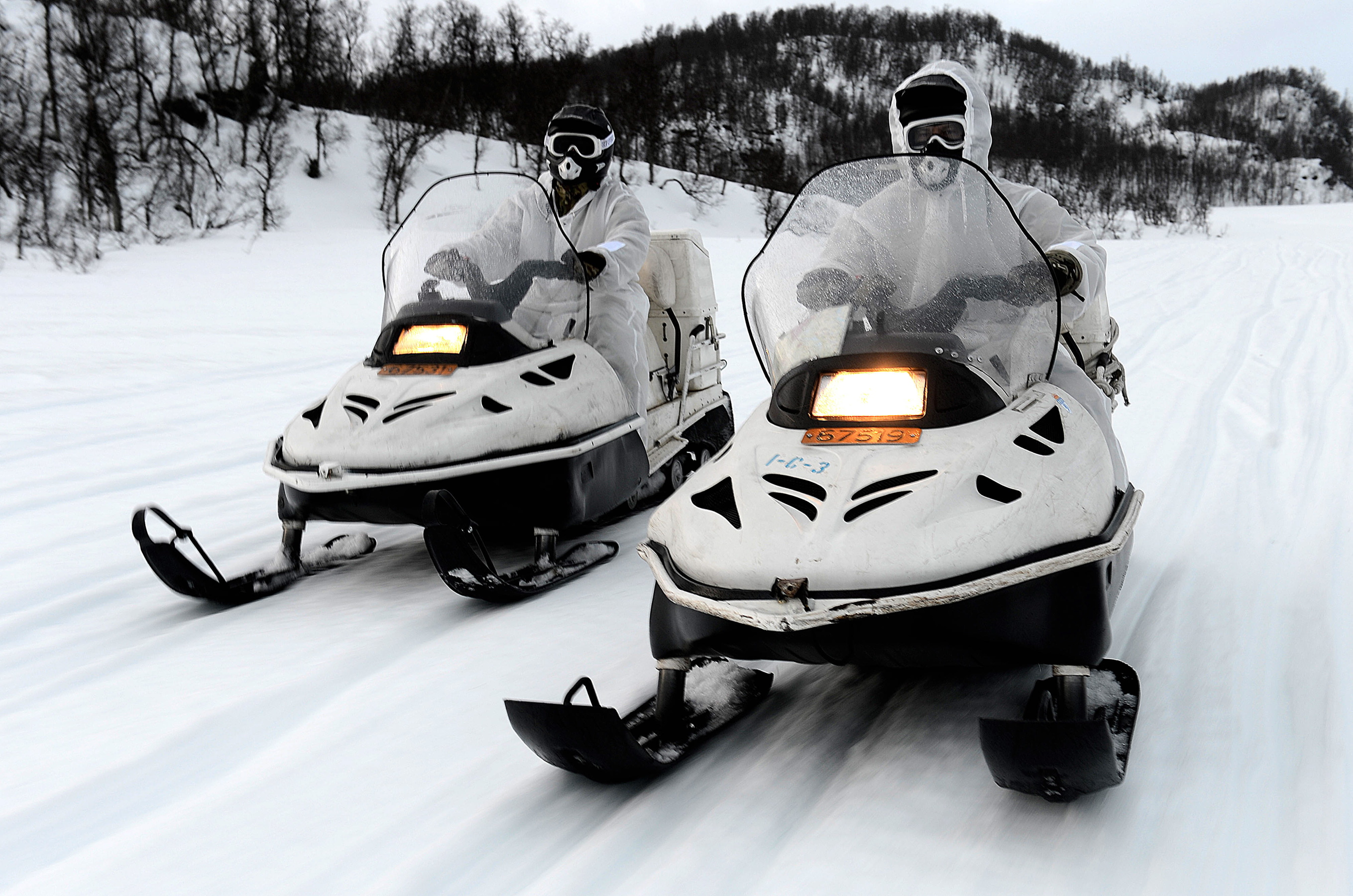
Supacat modifies and supplies Bombardier Lynx snowmobiles to the UK's Royal Marines.

== SC Innovation ==
SC Innovation provides engineering solutions to support all SC Group non-defence business. SC Innovation incorporates specialist vehicle work with the Royal National Lifeboat Institution (RNLI) and the emergency services together with products and services for sectors such as oil & gas, marine, renewable energy and nuclear. Products include:

- The lifeboat Launch and Recovery System (L&RS) was developed specifically for the RNLI and in response to a requirement for an up-to-date and highly mobile transport system for a new class of lifeboat. The L&RS design incorporates several unique features that include a permanent, software controlled, Four-Track-Drive system to provide mobility in all beach conditions. In addition, the cradle that carries the boat rotates through 360 degrees to enable ‘Bow First’ launch and recovery.
- The Specialist Utility Vehicle 600 (SUV 600) is a production standard Land Rover Discovery 4x4 that is converted to 6x6 configuration for use in the emergency services and wider utility sectors.
- The Protected Transit Vehicle (PTV) was developed specifically for use in the oil & gas sector. It provides a fully ATEX Zone 2 compliant passenger and cargo transport capability tailored for use in potentially hazardous explosive and toxic environments.
- The Specialist Multi-purpose Vessel 24 (SMV 24) has been designed to provide a flexible, multi-role, high performance solution for conducting operations in support of the offshore and other maritime engineering sectors.

== Gallery ==
SC Innovation products

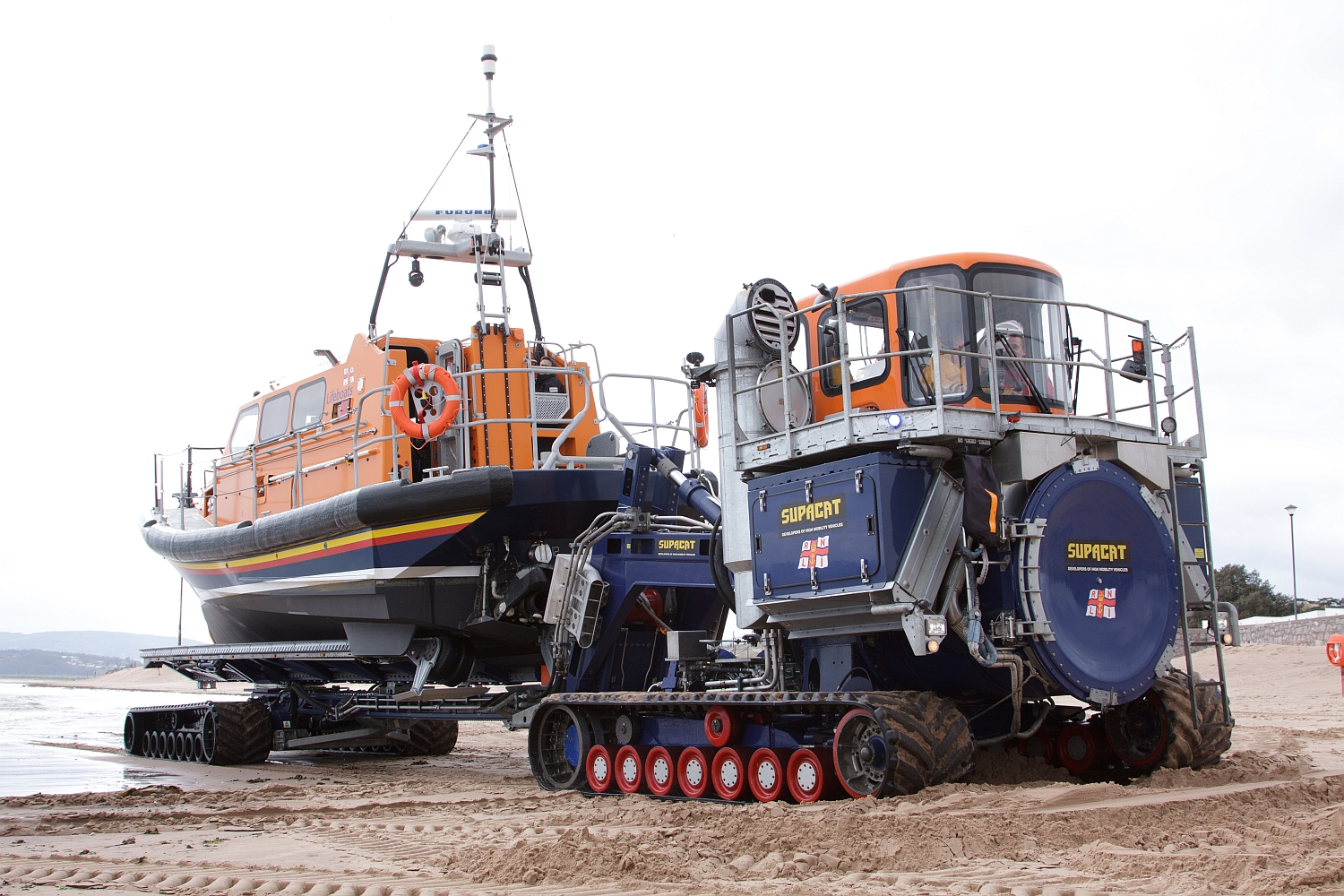
SC Innovation's lifeboat Launch and Recovery System (L&RS)

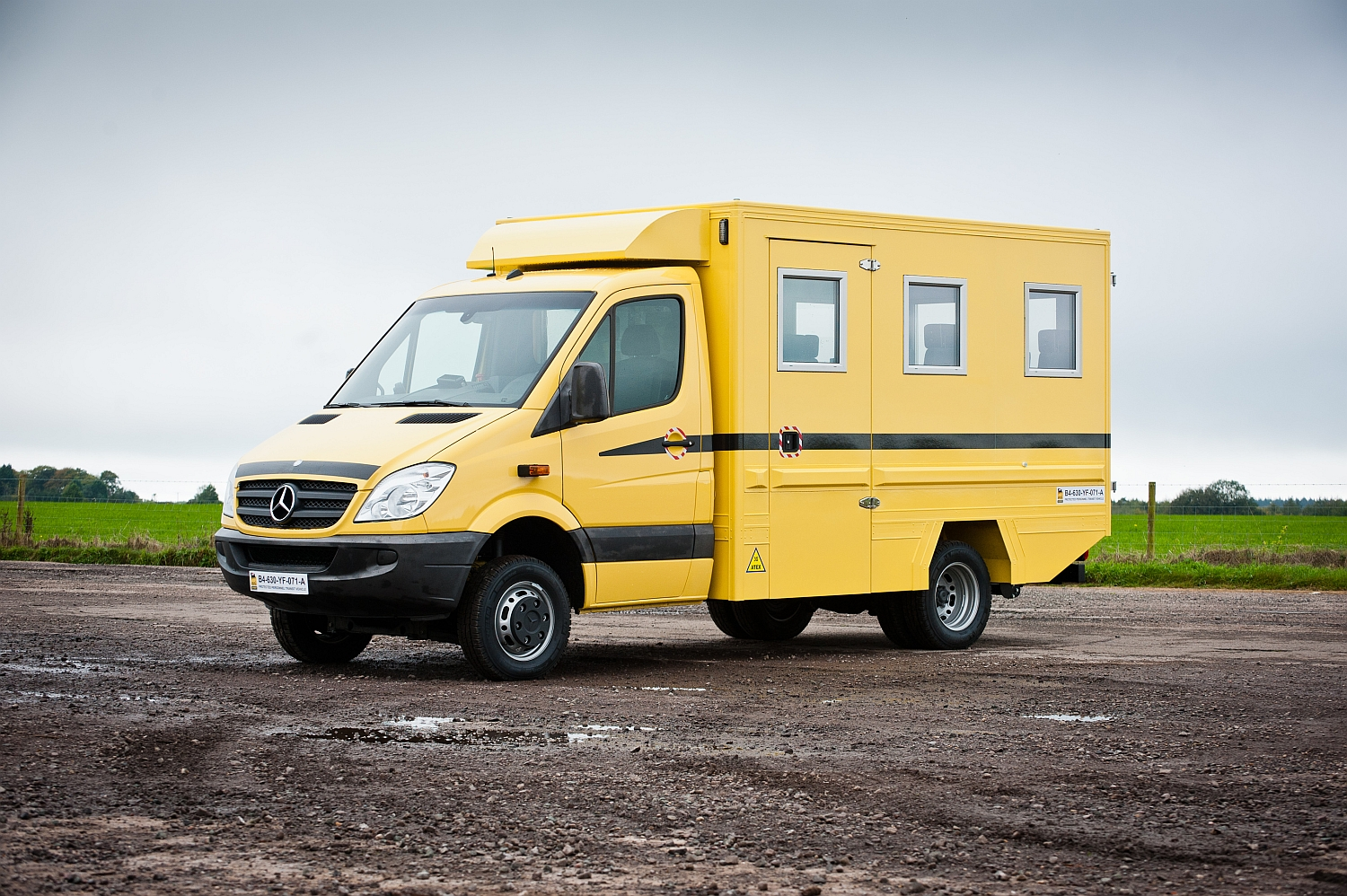
SC Innovation's Protected Transit Vehicle (PTV)

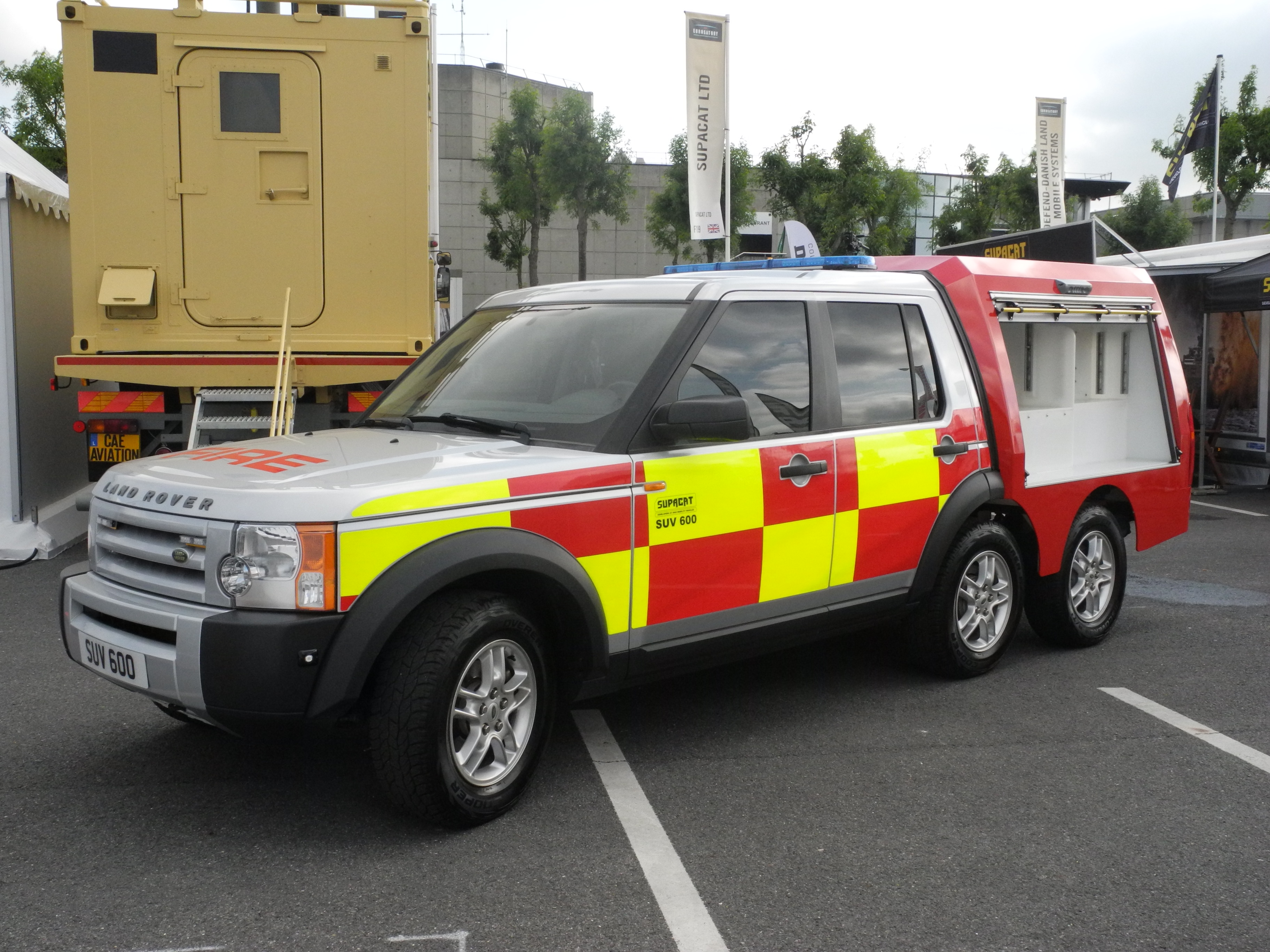
An early SUV600 as displayed at Eurosatory 2014 by Supacat

== Proteum ==
Proteum is the marine brand within SC Group and was formed following the acquisition of MDS Marine and Bukh Diesel UK.

Proteum represents and distributes a portfolio of marine products and services across the UK and Ireland, these including Bukh, Marine Diesel Sweden, OXE Diesel and Konrad propulsion systems. The company has two UK offices, these in Poole and Hamble.

At the DSEI 2015 defence and security exhibition held in London, 15–18 September, OXE Diesel launched what the company claims to be the first viable high power NATO single fuel policy compliant diesel outboard engine for military users. According to the company, the 200 hp outboard has the highest power density of any marine diesel and incorporates a self-contained belt propulsor unit (S-BPU) to eliminate bevel gears and transfer shafts. In addition, the unit uses a conventional automotive engine block adapted for marine use, and unlike most outboards is mounted horizontally to improve reliability and reduce maintenance.

== Blackhill Engineering Services ==
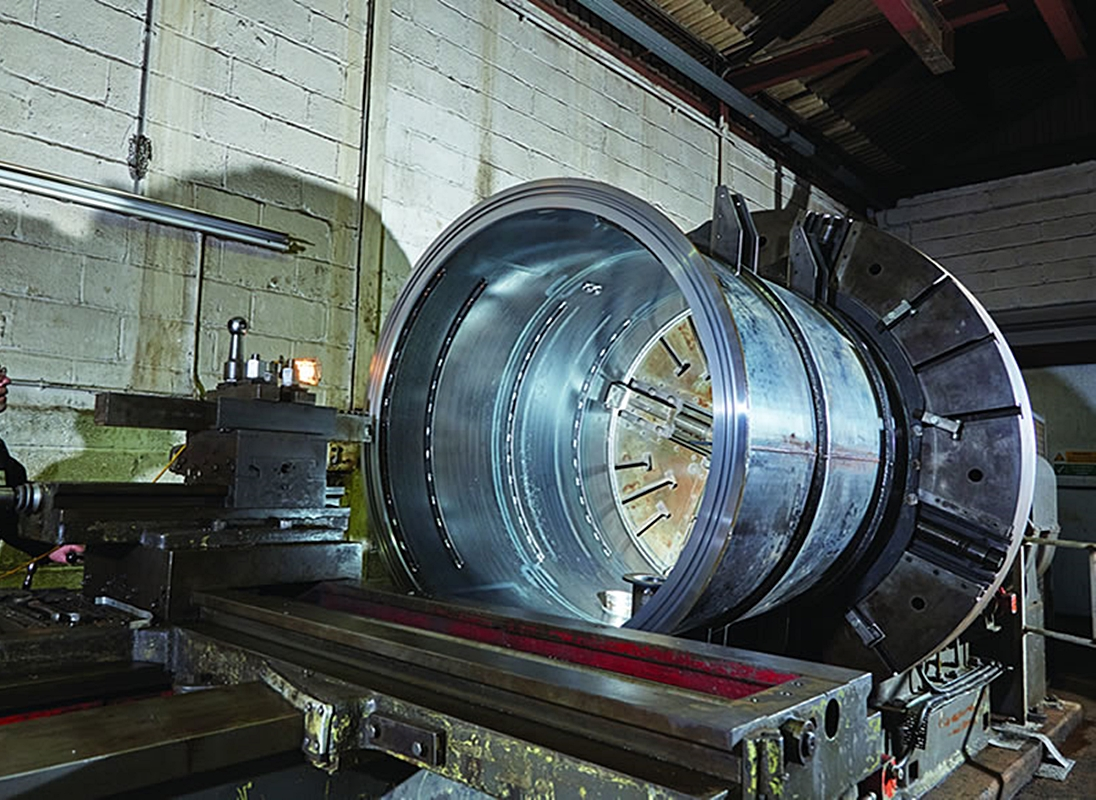
Blackhill Engineering product

Blackhill Engineering Services is a heavy fabrication and machining specialist. Supacat Limited acquired Blackhill in late 2014.

Blackhill Engineering Services Ltd. has existed in various forms since the 1950s; originally its main role was to provide an engineering centre for English China Clays (Quarries Division), which looked after capital and revenue repairs, modifications, projects and servicing, for sites all over the United Kingdom and Channel Islands. Early in 1995 the company became privately owned.

Production of SC Group's SC Innovation's Lifeboat Launch and Recovery System (L&RS) is now undertaken by Blackhill Engineering.

In October 2015 Blackhill Engineering issued a press release informing it had been contracted by Supacat, also part of SC Group, to manufacture replacement chassis frames for the Supacat Jackal vehicle.

== Television and film appearances ==
- Brazil (1985; Supacat ATMP)
- Top Gear (Supacat Jackal)
- Top Gear Apocalypse (Supacat Jackal; Top Gear: Apocalypse)

== See also ==
- Supacat All Terrain Mobility Platform (ATMP)
- Supacat Jackal
- Bowler Wildcat
