= Blackhill Engineering =

British engineering and metalwork fabrication company

- Type: Limited Company
- Industry: Design, Fabrication & Engineering
- Founded: 1950s (exact date not currently available)
- Number of locations: 1
- Key people: Paul Fishwick current General Manager; Mark Harrison current Engineering Manager
- Products: Design, manufacture, machining and repair/maintenance of steel and aluminium structures of various types
- Website: Blackhill website

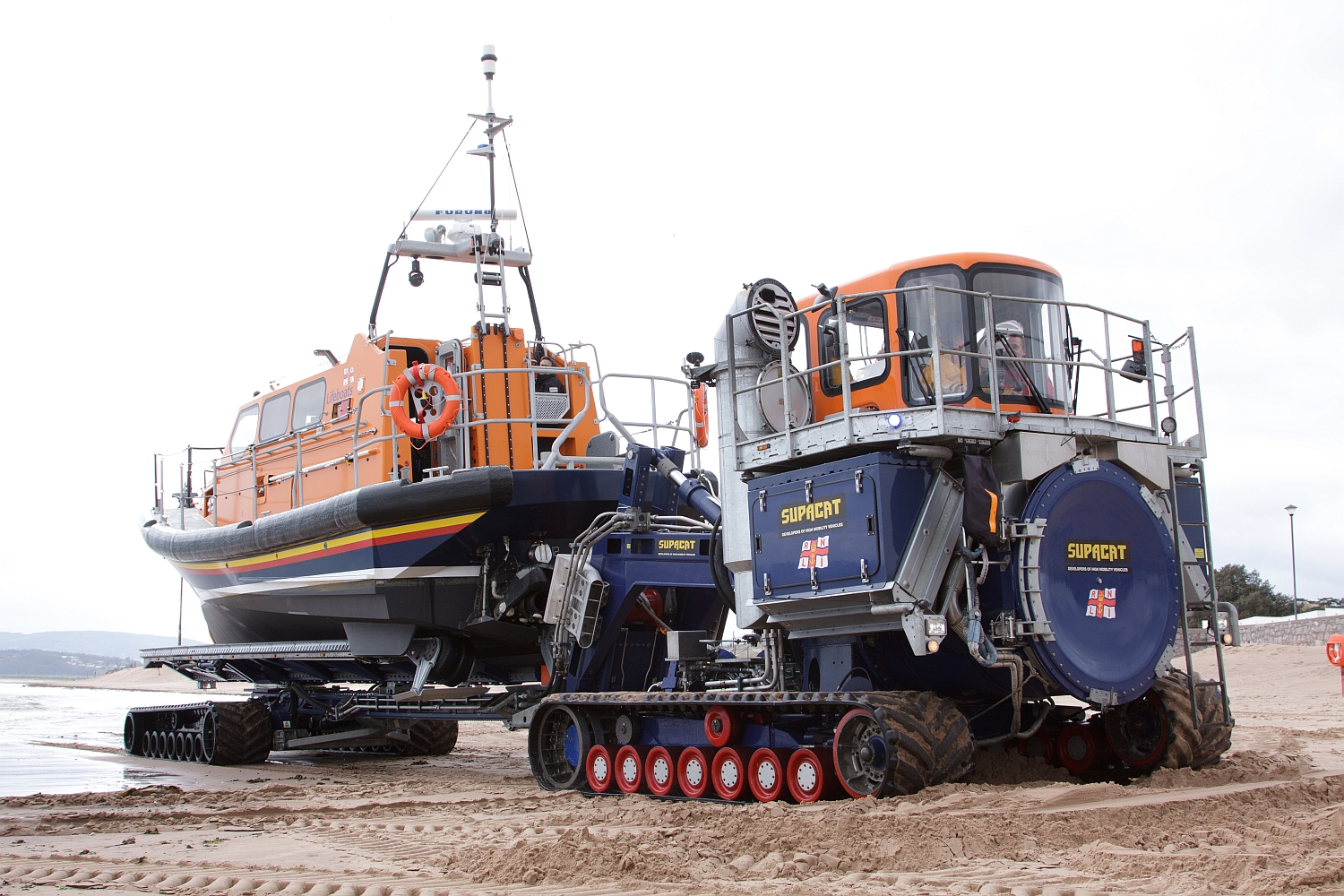
Blackhill Engineering is involved in the manufacture of SC Innovation's lifeboat Launch and Recovery System (L&RS)

Blackhill Engineering was an British engineering and metalwork fabrication company. The company was based in Devon and has been trading for over 60 years.

== Description ==
Blackhill Engineering Ltd has existed in various forms since the 1950s, its main role was originally to be an engineering support services provider for English China Clays PLC (Quarries Division), looking after capital and revenue repairs, modifications, projects and servicing, for sites all over the United Kingdom and Channel Islands. English China Clays was acquired by Imetal (Imerys) in 1999.

Early in 1995 the company became privately owned, and with traditional markets declining, has since then expanded its portfolio of work considerably. Blackhill now serves a number of key industries including defence, marine, quarrying, construction, petrochemical and renewables, with the nuclear sector a target for future business development.

Blackhill currently is based out of dunkeswell.

Blackhill used to have one of the largest physical machining capability within the South West of England, capable of handling 60-tonne units in a single lift by workshop cranes. Capabilities also include machining envelopes of up to five cubic meters in size.

Blackhill Engineering Services Limited filed for voluntary liquidation in June 2014, and was acquired by Supacat Limited in July 2014. Following a rebranding by Supacat, Blackhill Engineering Limited is now part of the SC Group. Following acquisition by Supacat [SC Group] Blackhill achieved ISO 9001 certification and ISO 1090 certification to execution class 3, this allowing further diversification by the company.

Production of SC Group's SC Innovation's Lifeboat Launch and Recovery System (L&RS) for the RNLI is now undertaken by Blackhill Engineering. The company has also been contracted by Supacat to manufacture replacement chassis frames for the Supacat Jackal vehicle. In a further award via Supacat, Blackhill carried out refurbishment work for the BOLT wave energy converter "Lifesaver" for Fred. Olsen Ltd.

== Gallery ==
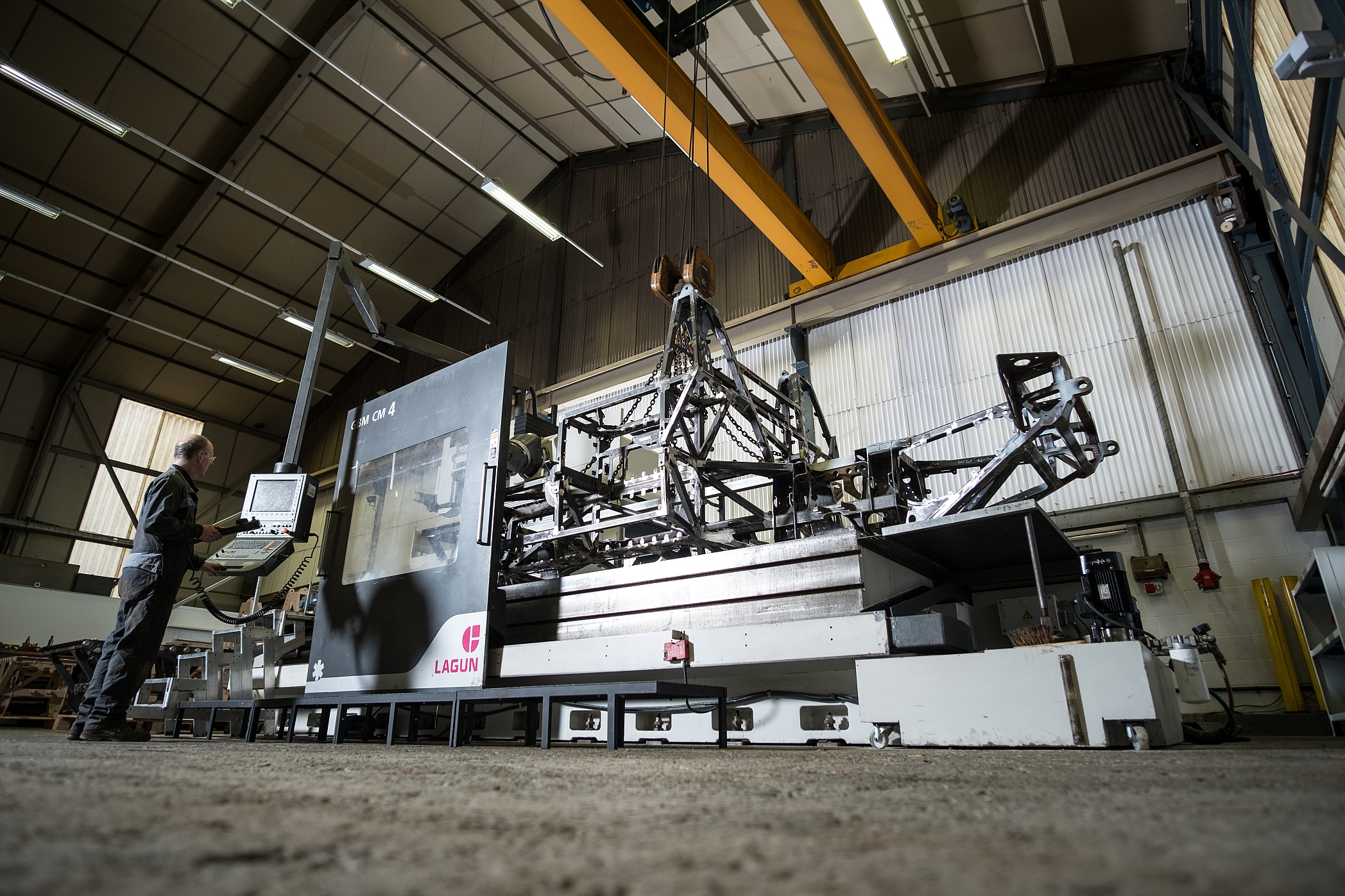
Blackhill used to have one of the largest physical machining capability within the South West of England, capable of handling 60-tonne units in a single lift by workshop cranes

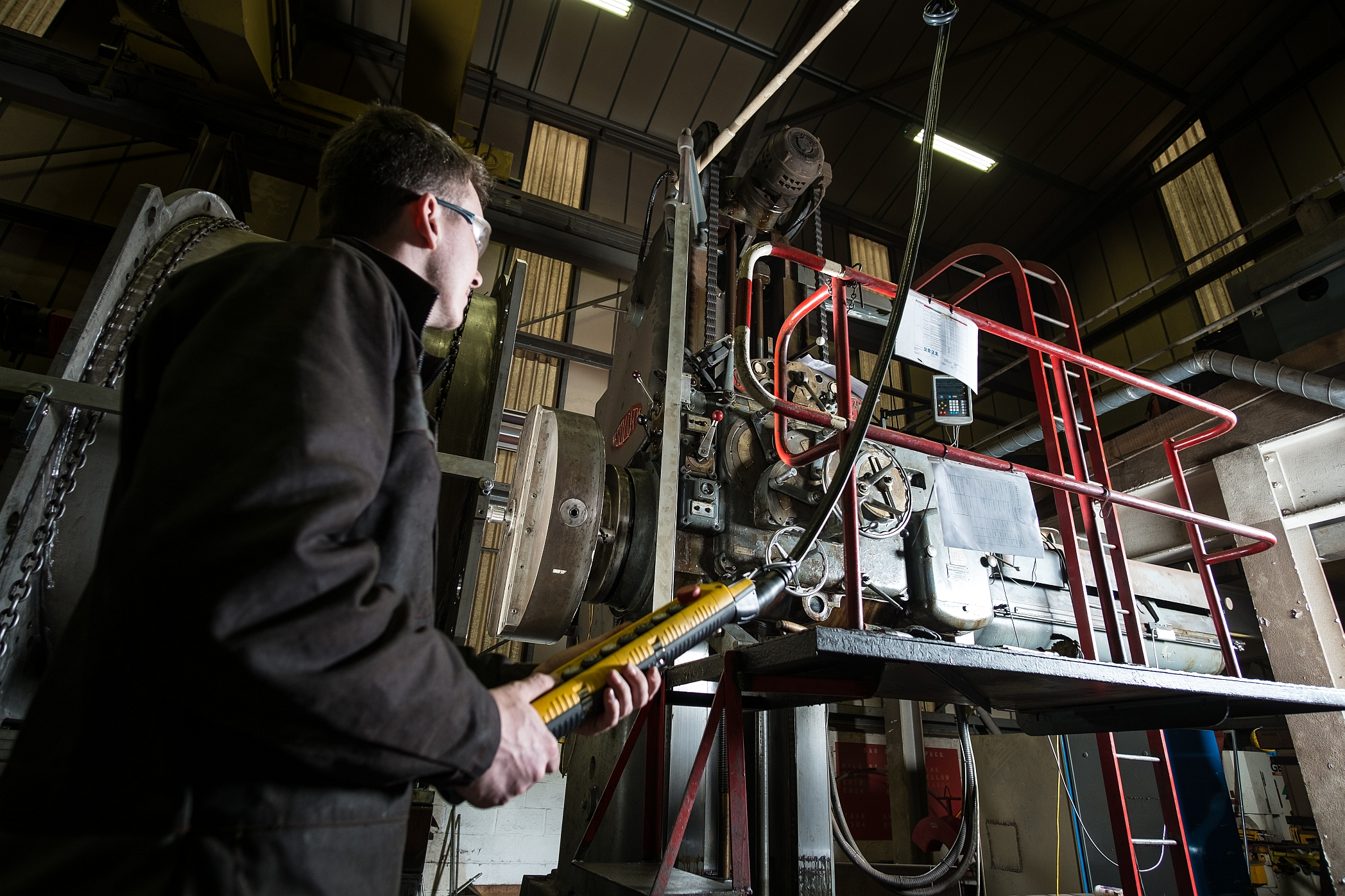
Following acquisition by Supacat [SC Group] Blackhill achieved ISO 9001 certification and ISO 1090 certification to execution class 3

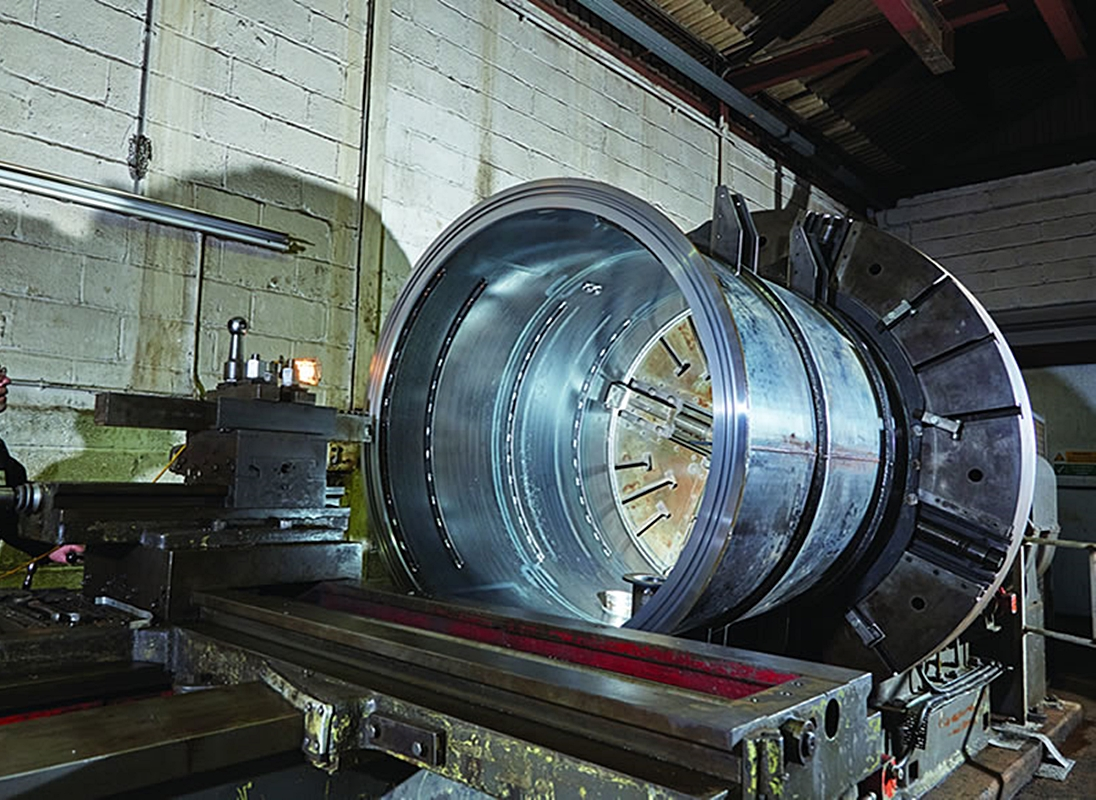
Blackhill Engineering is involved in the manufacture of SC Innovation's lifeboat Launch and Recovery System (L&RS); this is the engine bay

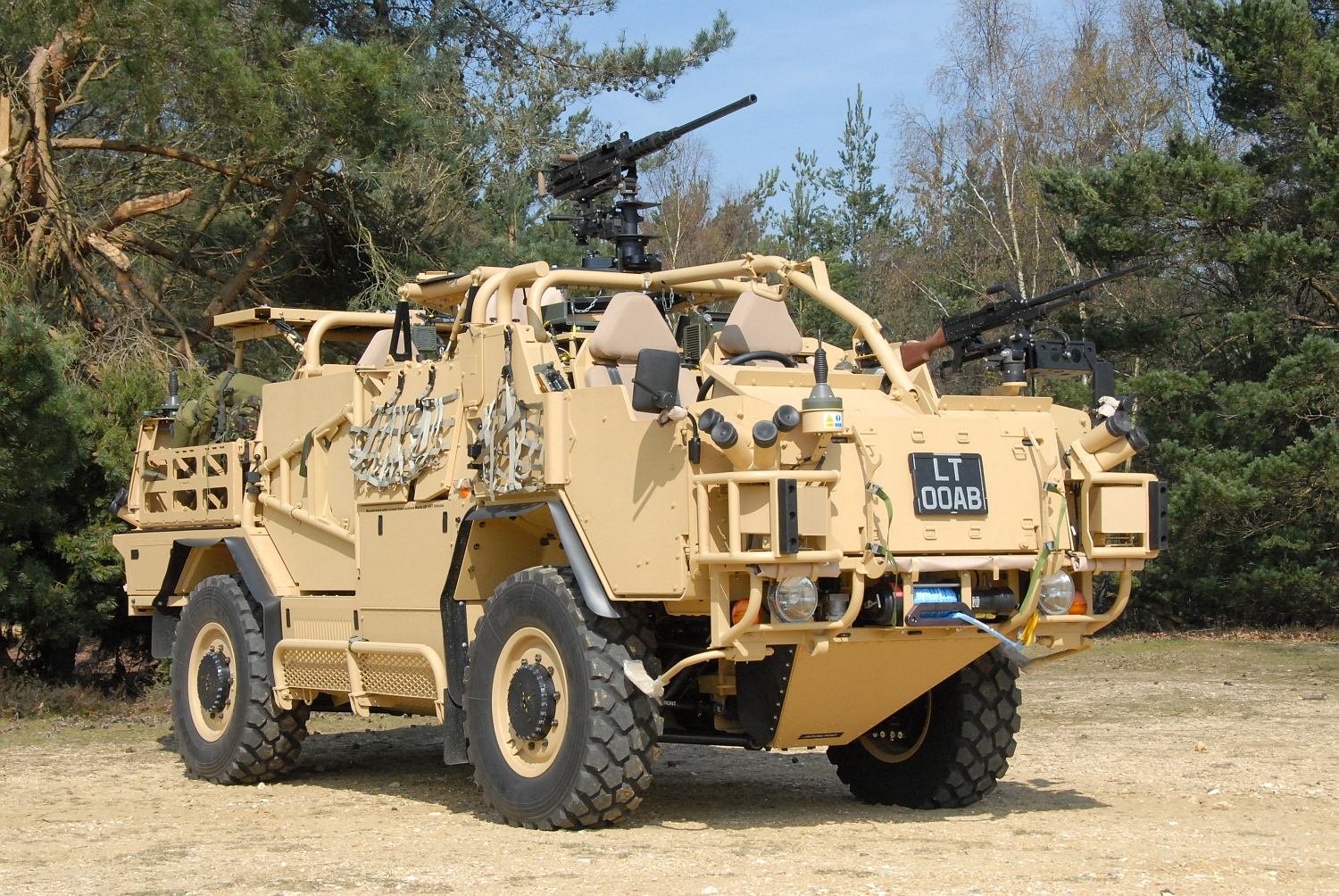
Blackhill Engineering is involved in the manufacture of Supacat's Jackal
