= All Terrain Mobility Platform =

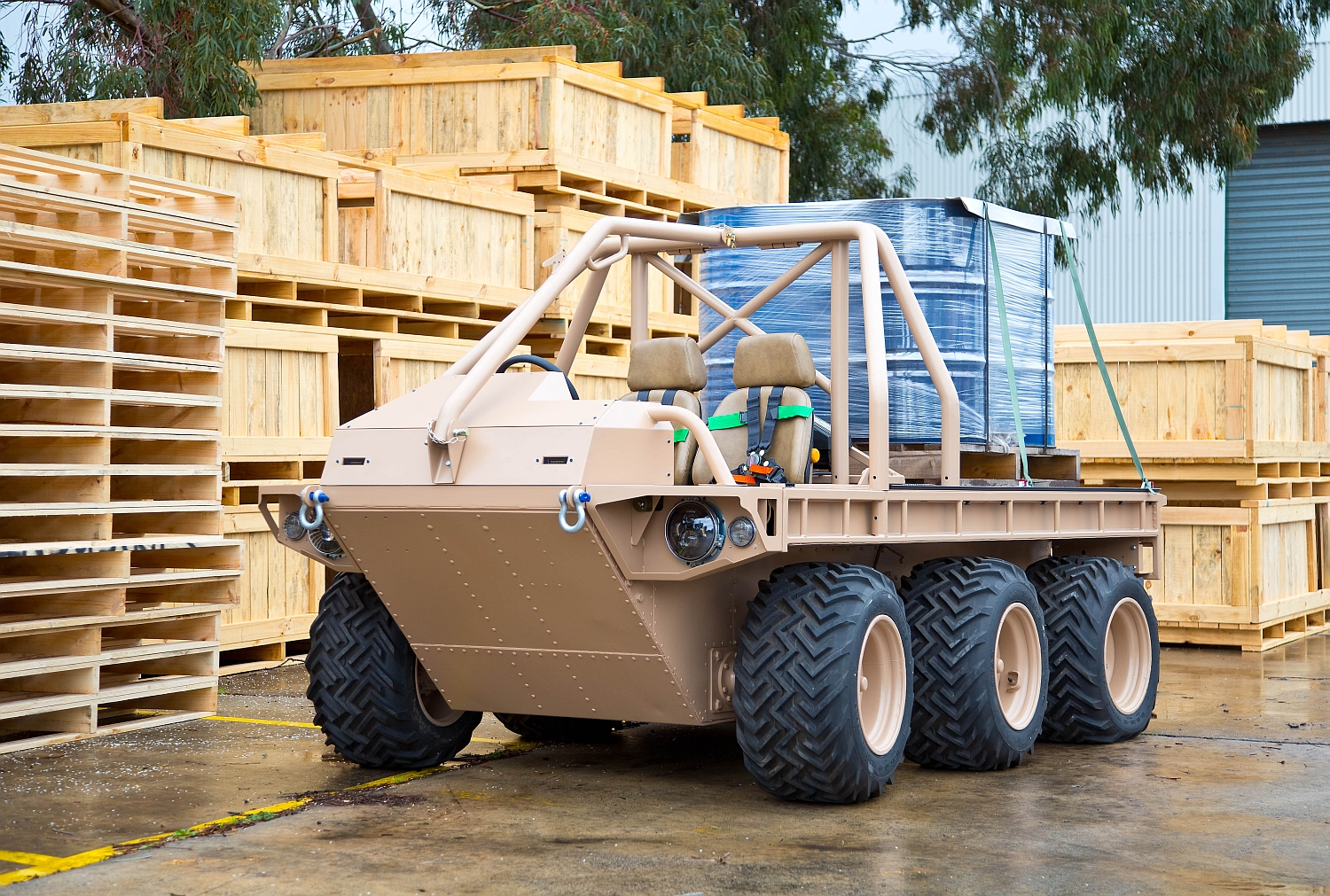
- Place of origin: United Kingdom

Specifications
- Mass: 2,000 kg (laden)
- Length: 3.44 m
- Width: 2.03 m (wheel to wheel)
- Height: 1.85 m (open - to top of restraint frame). 2.01 m (cabbed vehicle)
- Crew: 2
- Armor: None
- Secondary armament: 7.62 mm GPMG
- Engine: VW ADE 1.9 turbocharged diesel 78 bhp (58 kW) @ 4000 rpm Max torque: 164 N·m (121 lbf·ft) @ 1850 rpm
- Suspension: Low pressure tyres
- Maximum speed: 64 km/h (40 mph)

The UK All Terrain Mobility Platform is commonly known by the name of its manufacturer Supacat. It is a lightweight, 6-wheeled vehicle used by airborne and air-mobile forces of the British Army since 1988.

== Description ==
The Supacat is amphibious and has a low ground pressure, enabling it to traverse rough terrain whilst carrying up to eight troops (and two crew), a standard NATO pallet or other stores (ammunition etc.).

A GPMG may also be fitted to create an effective mobile fire support platform. In addition, the ATMP in British Army service could be fitted with a MILAN Firing Post. The Parachute Regiment also conducted a successful proof of concept in 1989 by fitting a Javelin LML to the bed of the ATMP for drop zone air defence. A second ATMP acted as an ammunition limber.

It has permanent six wheel drive (6x6) with the front four wheels (two axles) steered conventionally by using a rotating handlebar arrangement. These handlebars also operate the steering brakes, which act independently on each side of the vehicle giving brake steering.

The Supacat is built around a steel rectangular hollow section chassis frame, which forms the entire shape of the vehicle and to which all components and attachments are fitted. The 'body' of the Supacat forms a hull that enables the vehicle to float and protects the majority of mechanical components.

The vehicle can be configured for a number of roles:

- Basic ATMP.
- FLPT (Fork Lift Pallet Trailer) to lift, handle and carry pallets up to 1.6 tonnes.
- SLLPT (Self Loading Lightweight Pallet Trailer).
- 'Fuel Cat', which is able to carry and pump up to 1000 litres of aviation fuel. It also carries an engine start system for aircraft and is able to tow an APFC (Air Portable Fuel Container).
- Mounted crane.
- Aircraft crash recovery.
- Radio rebroadcast stations.
- Casualty evacuation.

The Supacats were initially taken into service by the United Kingdom in 1988 and have been heavily used in active service.

A modified Supacat 6X6 MK III was used in the movie Brazil.

Supacat was rebranded as SC Group in September 2015. The Supacat brand was retained for the group's core defence business.

== Operators ==
- Brazil
- Malaysia
- United Kingdom
