= FIA European Baja Cup =

- Category: Cross-country bajas
- Country: Europe
- Inaugural season: 2021
- Drivers' champion: (Poland) Krzysztof Hołowczyc (O/A) (Italy) Alessandro Trivini Bellini (T2) (Portugal) João Dias (T3) (Portugal) Pau Navarro (T4)
- Co-Drivers' champion: (Poland) Lukasz Kurzeja (O/A)
- Teams' champion: Santag Racing (O/A); Rally Raid Team Türkiye (T4)
- Official website: FIA European Baja Cup

The FIA European Baja Cup, formerly known as the FIA European Cup for Cross-Country Bajas, is a cross-country baja series organised by the FIA, culminating with a champion driver, co-driver, and team; with additional trophies awarded throughout each category.

The series runs concurrent with the FIA World Baja Cup and FIM Bajas World Cup, alongside the World Rally-Raid Championship and FIA Middle East Baja Cup. Started in 2021, the series was designed to attract new entrants to rally raid and allow them to run for an official FIA title. It was renamed to the European Baja Cup in 2024.

== Champions ==
Season	Driver	Co-driver	Car
2021	(Poland) Krzysztof Hołowczyc	(Poland) Łukasz Kurzeja	Mini John Cooper Works Rally
2022	(Portugal) João Ferreira	(Poland) Łukasz Kurzeja	Mini John Cooper Works Rally
2023	(Poland) Krzysztof Hołowczyc	(Poland) Łukasz Kurzeja	Mini John Cooper Works Rally
2024	(Portugal) João Ferreira	(Portugal) Filipe Palmeiro	Mini John Cooper Works Rally Plus
2025	(Poland) Bartłomiej Wajzer	(Poland) Ernest Górecki	Toyota Land Cruiser KDJ 155
2026	(Poland) Mariusz Wiatr	(Poland) Łukasz Łaskawiec	Ford F150 EVO+

== See also ==
- Rally raid
