= 2027 Dakar Rally =

Off-road motorsport event in Portugal, Spain, Morocco and Western Sahara

Part of the Dakar Rally
← Previous event	Next event →
- Host country: Portugal; Spain; Morocco / (Sahrawi Arab Democratic Republic) Western Sahara
- Dates run: 9–23 January 2027
- Start: Loulé & Faro, Portugal
- Finish: Marrakesh, Morocco
- Stages: 12 (4,341 km; 2,697 mi)
- Overall distance: 7,824 km (4,862 mi)

The 2027 Dakar Rally is a rally raid event scheduled to be held between 9–23 January 2027. It is the 49th edition of the Dakar Rally, organized by Amaury Sport Organisation (ASO). Originally scheduled for 1–15 January 2027 in Saudi Arabia, it was exceptionally moved to Europe and Africa due to the impact of the 2026 Iran war. The event will start in Portugal before moving to Morocco and Western Sahara for 12 stages, finishing in Marrakesh. It will be the first time the race has been held in Africa since 2007.

The event is scheduled to be held as the first round of the 2027 World Rally-Raid Championship.

== Background ==
The Dakar Rally was originally held in 1978, after Frenchman Thierry Sabine got lost in the Libyan desert, while competing in the 1977 Abidjan-Nice Rally. He was found near death three days later. The experience inspired him to hold a race from Paris, France to Dakar Senegal. The event continued to be held in Africa until the 2008 event was cancelled at short notice due to security concerns in North Africa. It first moved to South America in 2009 and then to Saudi Arabia in 2020.

The original route for the 2027 event was released on 5 May 2026, and was originally scheduled to be held over 13 stages and 5,320 km, between 1–15 January 2027. However, on 25 October 2026, the ASO announced that the event would not be held in Saudi Arabia and would be moved to a location to be announced. While no reasoning was given by the ASO, the 2026 Iran war was reported elsewhere as the cause, with other sporting organisations such as Formula One, the World Rally Championship and the Asian Football Confederation cancelling or postponing events within the region due to the war.

On 30 October 2026, the ASO announced that the race would be moved to Europe and Africa, and take place between 9–23 January 2027. A prologue and a stage will be held in Loulé, in the Algarve region of Portugal. The remaining stages will be held in Morocco, with biouvacs in Bouarfa, Zagora, Agadir, Smara (in the disputed Western Sahara) and Marrakesh. The return to Morocco and Western Sahara will be the first time the event has been held in Africa since 2007, when it left the continent due to security concerns. The Dakar Classic, Future Mission 1000 and Saudi Next Gen programme were all announced as continuing to be part of the event in its move to Europe and Africa.

== Timeline ==
- 20 November 2026: Registrations close.
- 5 Januuary 2027: Service park open in Loulé & Faro.
- 6-8 January 2027: Scrutineering in Loulé & Faro
- 9 January 2027: Starting podium and the Prologue Stage.
- 23 January 2027: Race finish and finish podium.

== Stages ==
Stage	Date		Start	Finish	Special (km)	Total (km)
Stage	Date		Start	Finish	FIM & FIA	FIM & FIA
Prologue	Saturday	9 January 2027	Loulé	Loulé	29	129
1	Sunday	10 January 2027	Loulé	Loulé	100	300
Transfer	Monday	11 January 2027	Loulé	Bouârfa	-	-
2	Tuesday	12 January 2027	Bouârfa	Bouârfa	390	490
3	Wednesday	13 January 2027	Bouârfa	Bouârfa	410	490
4	Thursday	14 January 2027	Bouârfa	Zagora	490	750
5	Friday	15 January 2027	Zagora	Zagora	365	540
6	Saturday	16 January 2027	Zagora	Agadir	365	760
Rest Day	Sunday	17 January 2027	Agadir		-	
7	Monday	18 January 2027	Agadir	Smara	500	790
8	Tuesday	19 January 2027	Smara	Bivouac Refuge	355	525
9	Wednesday	20 January 2027	Bivouac Refuge	Smara	390	625
10	Thursday	21 January 2027	Smara	Smara	470	560
11	Friday	22 January 2027	Smara	Marrakesh	455	1035
12	Saturday	23 January 2027	Marrakesh	Marrakesh	22	240
Total					4,341	7,234
