= Bowler Wildcat =

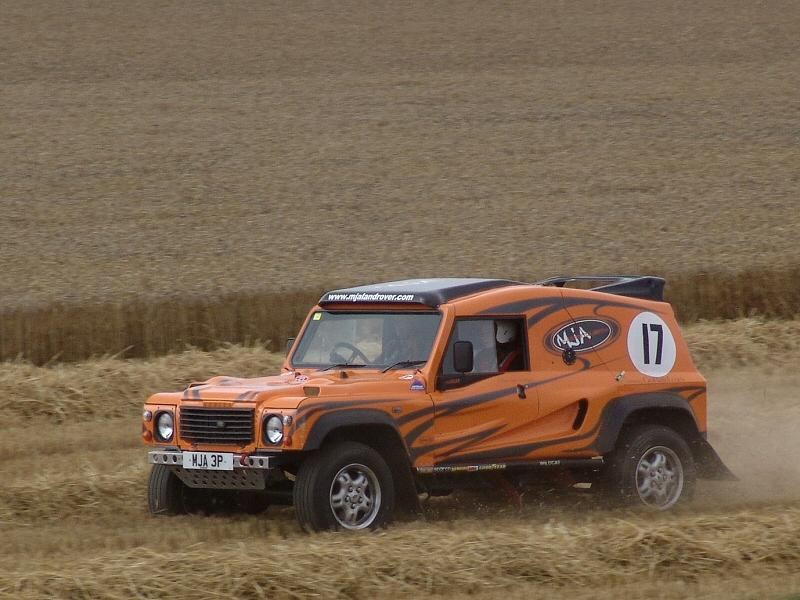

Overview
- Manufacturer: Bowler Offroad / QT Services
- Production: 1998-2007

Body and chassis
- Class: Rally vehicle
- Layout: Front-engine, four-wheel-drive layout
- Related: Land Rover Defender

Chronology
- Predecessor: Bowler Tomcat
- Successor: Bowler Nemesis

The Bowler Wildcat is an off-road vehicle originally made by Bowler Offroad. It is an evolution of the Bowler Tomcat using some components from the Land Rover Defender.

The initial version, Wildcat 100, had a tubular chassis with 100" wheelbase and used the same body style as the previous box-section chassis "Tomcat 100". The Wildcat 200 was an evolution of this having a completely new spaceframe (of 106" wheelbase) and fibreglass body panels.

The Wildcat has been entered in various off-road rally raids, most notably the Dakar Rally and Rallye des Pharaons.

The manufacturing rights to the Wildcat were sold by Bowler to Qt Services in December 2007, to provide support to existing Wildcat owners while Bowler concentrated on production of their newer vehicle, the Bowler Nemesis. Since then, QT Services have continued to support owners in competitive events and have made further developments to the vehicle.

In 2011, Supacat started marketing a militarized Wildcat in collaboration with QT Services. Promotional materials show the vehicle equipped with a Kongsberg Protector Super Lite remote weapon station.

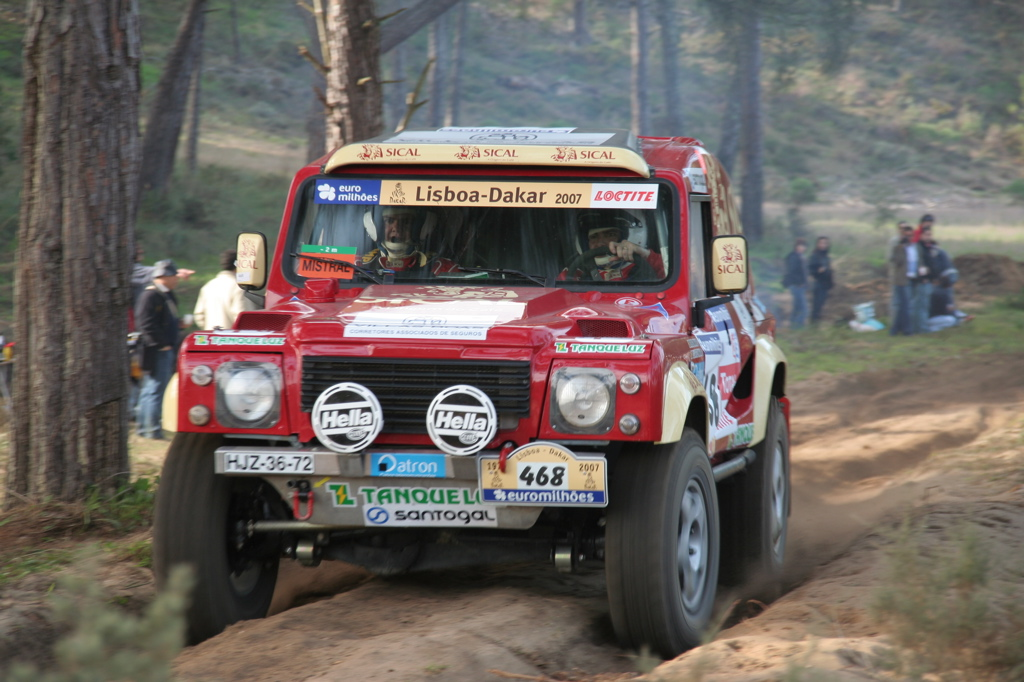
A Wildcat in the 2007 Dakar Rally

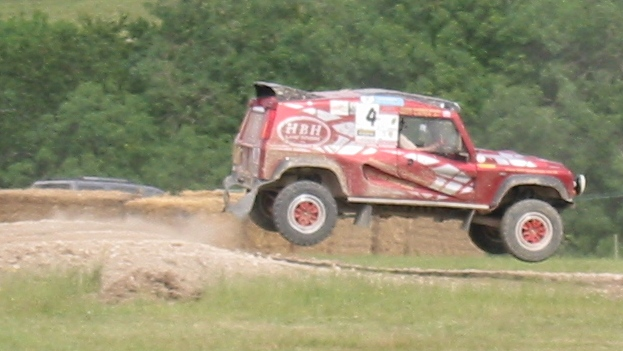
A Wildcat at speed during the Goodwood Festival of Speed in 2005

== Design and construction ==
The Wildcat has a tubular space frame construction that incorporates a roll cage as an integral part of the frame structure. The body panels are made of fiberglass.

The suspension system uses Land Rover Discovery beam axles front and rear. The front axles are located by radius rods and a Panhard rod. The rear axle is located by trailing arms and a Watts linkage.

Bowler originally offered the Wildcat with a choice of 4, 4.6 or 5 litre displacement V8 engines in several levels of engine tuning, or a 2.2 or 2.5 litre turbo diesel.

An optional feature offered by Bowler was a lift device that could lift the vehicle past the lowest travel of the front and rear suspension. The lift was intended to be used to assist in digging the vehicle out of the soft ground or to facilitate changing a wheel. The lift device consisted of a large steel plate on a hinged sub-frame attached to the underside of the vehicle frame between the front and rear axles. The lift was lowered by a hydraulic ram that was controlled from inside the vehicle. The lift plate also served to protect the underside of the vehicle when raised.

== Specification ==
- Engine type: V8
- Displacement: 4.6 L (281 in^{3})
- Power: 221 ps (218 bhp / 163 kW)
- Torque: 400 Nm (295 lb-ft)
- Power/ liter: 48 ps (47 hp)
- Power / weight: 121 ps (119 bhp) / t
- Torque / weight: 219 Nm (162 lb-ft) / t
- Transmission: 6-Speed

== Research platform ==
Two Wildcats have been retrofitted by BAE Systems with fly-by-wire control systems, high-performance computing payloads and sensors for estimating the local terrain, including lidars and cameras. The first of which is used by the BAE Systems Advanced Technology Centre as part of their autonomous systems research. The second is used by the Mobile Robotics Group at Oxford University as part of their ongoing research into lifelong infrastructure-free navigation for autonomous vehicles.

== Top Gear ==
The Bowler Wildcat was featured in series 2 episode 1 of the British motoring programme Top Gear, which aired on May 11, 2003.
