= Rally raid =

Type of long-distance, multi-day, off-road racing

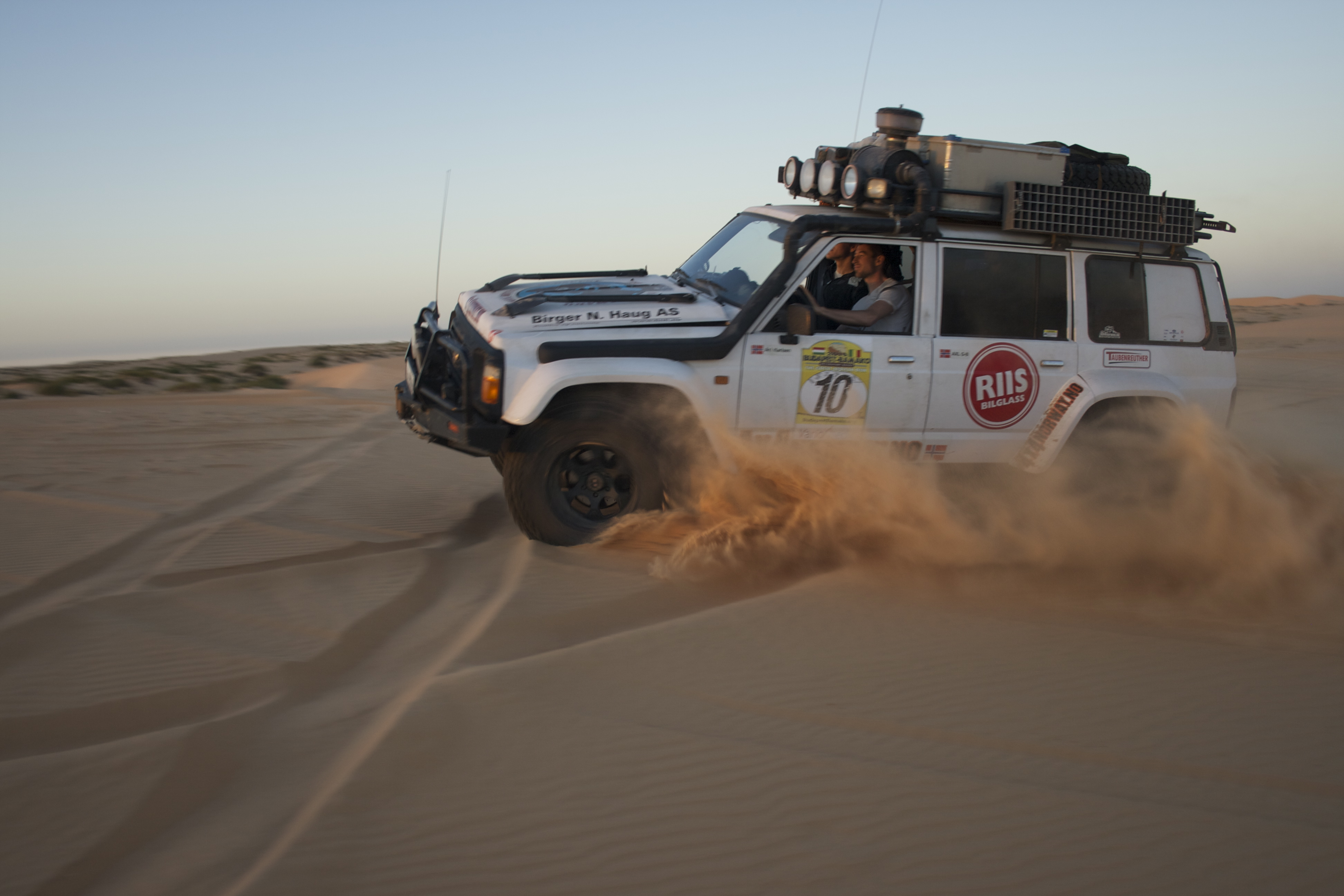
A Norwegian rally team trying to complete one of the more difficult stages of the Budapest-Bamako rally in 2014

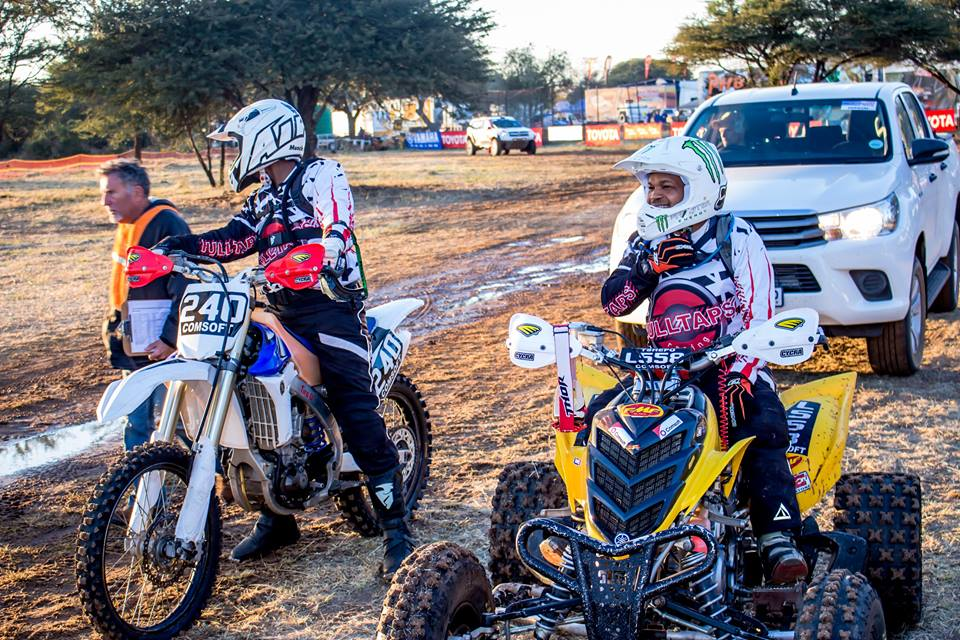
2017 Kalahari 1000km Desert Race

Rally raid is a type of off-road motorsport event competed with different types of vehicles. Along with shorter baja rallies, rally raid constitutes cross-country rallying. Both the Fédération Internationale de l'Automobile (FIA) and Fédération Internationale de Motocyclisme (FIM) co-organise a common World Rally-Raid Championship featuring the same events and types of vehicles.

The length of a rally raid can be as short as 2–3 days to as long as 15 days with marathon rally raids like the Dakar Rally. With skill in navigation being key, the driving skill and endurance of riders, drivers, co-drivers, and machines are put to the test. The total distance covered can be between 600 km to over 5,000 km with terrain ranging from sandy dunes, forest roads, mountain roads, and dry river beds; among others.

== Origin ==
The Peking–Paris of 1907 was the first long distance rally raid, the French term of "raid" for an expedition or collective endeavour whose promoters, the newspaper "Le Matin", rather optimistically expected participants to help each other; it was 'won' by Prince Scipione Borghese, Luigi Barzini, and Ettore Guizzardi in an Itala.

== Characteristics ==
=== Rally raid ===
Well known rally raids include the Abu Dhabi Desert Challenge and Rallye du Maroc which are included in the world championships. Others include the TransAnatolia Rally Raid, Hellas Rally Raid, and Dinaric Rally Raid.

National cross-country rally championships are held in Poland, Portugal, Russia, Spain, Brazil and South Africa, among others.

=== Marathon rally raid ===
The best-known marathon rally raid is the Dakar Rally, which can last from 10 to 15 days. Other prominent marathon rallies include the Africa Eco Race, Rally dos Sertões and Silk Way Rally. For amateurs the Budapest-Bamako has been considered the world's largest amateur rally raid spanning two continents and 9,000 km.

The first African rally raid run was the Côte-Côte Rally, first held in December 1976.

== Navigation ==
Navigation is primarily accomplished using a paper or digital roadbook in conjunction with a digital odometer to measure distance. The use of GPS or GPS-enabled devices, in contrast with desert racing, is not allowed. Competitors have no knowledge of the course until they receive the roadbook and any sort of pre-running is prohibited; which highlights the adventure aspect of rally raid. This is in stark contrast to rallying and desert racing where pre-running or reconnaissance is required or recommended for optimal performance on the course. The roadbook that is used is not as precise as the pacenotes used in stage rally, making navigation just as important as the driving. Bike and quad riders also have to navigate on their own while riding their vehicle; making concentration key during a rally raid event.

== Vehicles and classes ==
Rally raid is made of various different categories and classes of vehicles. Regulations from the ASO, FIA, and FIM define the rules for each category.

=== Moto class ===
The Moto class is divided between three groups: RallyGP, Rally2, and Rally3. RallyGP is the top moto class with riders and manufacturers eligible for the World Championship in FIM rankings. This class is only open to the most experienced competitors while Rally2 is available to any rider not considered RallyGP. Rally3 is for moto-enduro machines adapted for rally use. All three have a maximum capacity of 450cc. Rally2 and Rally3 are given World Cup status in the FIM-rankings.

Popular motorcycles include those made by KTM, Gas Gas, Honda and Husqvarna because many of their bikes have finished in top positions. BMW motorcycles, Yamaha and Triumph have also been successful in the Dakar.

=== Quad class ===
The class for quads was originally a sub-class for the larger moto-class, but has been given more prominence in recent years. The class also has World Cup status within the FIM.

=== Car class—T1 and T2 ===
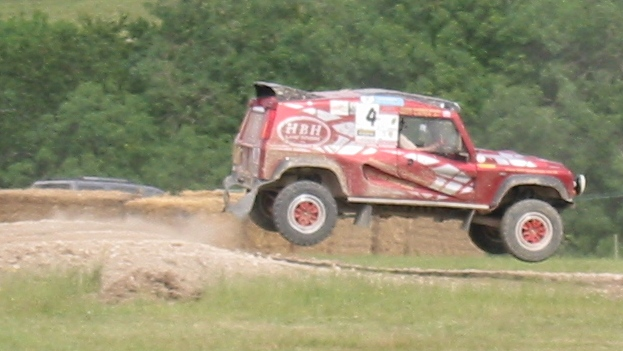
Bowler Wildcat rally-raid vehicle

The car class is made up of vehicles weighing less than 3,500 kg (7,716 lb) and subdivided into several categories. The T1 Group is made up of Prototype Cross-Country Cars and is subdivided into four primary categories: T1.U, T1.1, T1.2, and T1.3. T1.U (T1 Ultimate) is a recent category built exclusively for vehicles running on renewable energies; such as the Audi RS Q e-tron. T1.1 (4x4) and T1.2 (4x2) are open to vehicles running on petrol and diesel fuels; including the Mini John Cooper Works Buggy, Toyota Hilux, and Peugeot 3008 DKR. Subclass T1.3 is open to vehicles conforming to SCORE regulations. This includes the Hummer H3 buggy and various other buggies.

The T2 category is open to Series Production Cross-Country Cars; primarily the Toyota Land Cruiser and Nissan Patrol.

Other prominent examples in the Car Class included the Mitsubishi Pajero/Montero, the Volkswagen Race Touareg, the Bowler Wildcat 200, the Mini All4 Racing and the Nissan Navara.

=== T3 (Challenger) and T4 (SSV) ===
While originally a sub-class under the car category and later a combined class; the T3 and T4 classes have been recently separated into their own respective categories.

The T3 (Challenger) class is officially described as Lightweight Prototype Cross-Country Vehicles, and can include purpose-built machines such as the Red Bull OT3 and PH-Sport Zephyr while also allowing modified variations of vehicles built and sold by Polaris, Kawasaki, Yamaha, and Can-Am. The T4 (SSV) category is for Modified Production Cross-Country Side-by-Side (SSV) vehicles; such as those built by Polaris and Can-Am, but built closer to production standards.

Both categories must weigh no more than 3500 kg and are eligible for their own respective FIA World Cups.

=== Truck class—T5 ===
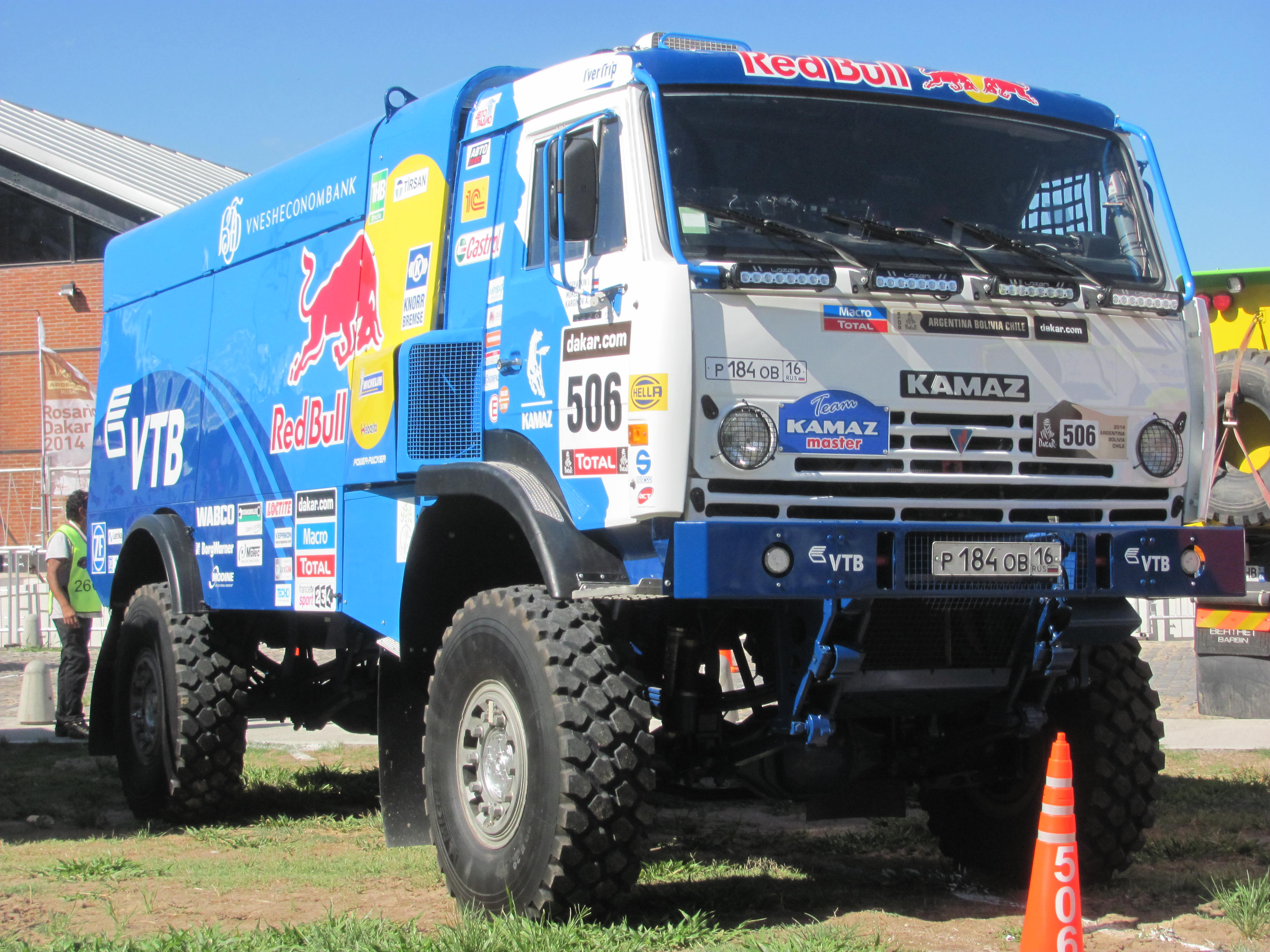
Kamaz 4326 modified for Dakar Rally

The Truck class, also known as "Camions" or "Lorries", is made up of vehicles weighing more than 3,500 kg (7,716 lb). While originally designated as Group T4; they have recently been solely given the T5 category with the T4 group now referring to Side by Side (UTV) vehicles.

Made up of both Prototype and Production Cross-Country Trucks; the class has been dominated by trucks built by Russian manufacturer Kamaz. Other competitors include Iveco, Hino, MAZ, Tatra, LIAZ, Mercedes-Benz Unimog, Renault Kerax, and various others. A FIA World Cup is awarded to drivers and co-drivers in this class.

== Notable events ==
Notable current rally raid and cross-country rally events
Event	Country / region	Established	Type
Dakar Rally	Saudi Arabia	1978	Marathon rally raid
Africa Eco Race	Morocco–Mauritania–Senegal	2009	Marathon rally raid
Silk Way Rally	Russia / Central Asia	2009	Marathon rally raid
Budapest–Bamako	Europe–Africa	2005	Amateur rally raid
Rally dos Sertões	Brazil	1993	Rally raid
Desafío Ruta 40	Argentina	2010	Rally raid
South African Safari Rally	South Africa	2025	Rally raid
BP Ultimate Rally Raid Portugal	Portugal / Spain	2024	Rally raid
Rallye du Maroc	Morocco	1982	Rally raid
Abu Dhabi Desert Challenge	United Arab Emirates	1991	Rally raid
Morocco Desert Challenge	Morocco	2008	Rally raid
TransAnatolia Rally	Turkey	2010	Rally raid
Hellas Rally	Greece	2014	Rally raid
Dinaric Rally	Croatia / Balkans	2021	Rally raid
Hispania Rally	Spain		Rally raid
Iberian Rally	Spain / Portugal		Rally raid
Sardegna Rally Raid	Italy		Rally raid
Rallye Breslau	Poland	1995	Cross-country rally
Fenek Rally	Morocco		Rally raid
Bosnia Rally	Bosnia and Herzegovina		Rally raid
Monterra Adventure Raid	Bosnia and Herzegovina		Adventure rally raid
Illyria Raid	Balkans		Adventure rally raid
Albania Raid	Albania		Rally raid
Sunraysia Safari	Australia		Cross-country rally
Sandalion Rally	Italy		Rally raid
1000 Dunas	Spain / Morocco		Rally raid
L'Oasis L'Original Rally	Tunisia		Rally raid
Fenix Rally	Tunisia		Rally raid
Addax Rally	Morocco		Rally raid
Morocc'n Roll Rally Raid	Morocco		Rally raid
Sandraiders Tunisia	Tunisia		Rally raid
Ouzina Challenge	Morocco		Rally raid
Tuareg Rallye	Morocco	2006	Rally raid
Rallye Aïcha des Gazelles	Morocco	1990	Navigation rally
Rallye Roses des Sables	Morocco		Navigation rally
Trans Italia Marathon	Italy		Rally raid
Sonora Rally	Mexico	2015	Rally raid
Baja Rally	Mexico		Baja rally
Cataviña Rallye	Mexico		Baja rally
Qatar International Baja	Qatar		Baja
Dubai International Baja	United Arab Emirates		Baja
Saudi Baja	Saudi Arabia		Baja
Jordan Baja	Jordan		Baja
Baja Greece	Greece		Baja
Italian Baja	Italy	1993	Baja
Baja España Aragón	Spain	1983	Baja
Baja TT Cuenca	Spain		Baja
Baja Poland	Poland	2009	Baja
Baja TT Sharish Reguengos Mourão	Portugal		Baja
HunGarian Baja	Hungary	2006	Baja
Baja de Portalegre 500	Portugal	1987	Baja
Rimba Raid	Malaysia	1989	Cross-country rally
Rebelle Rally	United States	2016	Navigation rally
Rally Adventure Georgia	Georgia		Cross-country rally
Udabno Rally	Georgia		Cross-country rally
Swank Rally di Sardegna	Italy		Motorcycle rally raid
Sardegna Legend Rally	Italy		Motorcycle rally raid
XTREM 300	Spain		Rally raid
Delta Adrenaline Rally Raid	Romania		Rally raid
RSB Rally Raid Trophy	Romania	2026	National rally raid
Baja Borsec	Romania	2026	National rally raid
Baja Satu Mare	Romania	2026	National rally raid
Baja Șagu	Romania	2026	National rally raid
Baja Dacus	Romania		National rally raid
Delta Rally Raid	Romania	2026	National rally raid
Kalahari/Sarona 1000	Botswana	1975	Marathon rally raid
